= Ernesto Bertarelli =

Swiss-Italian businessman (born 1965)

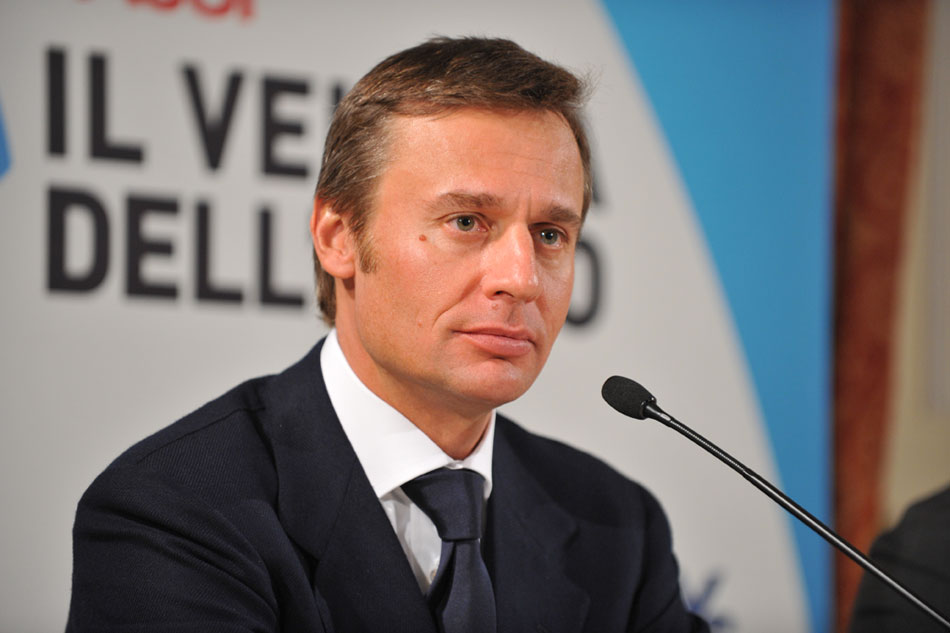
- Born: Ernesto Silvio Maurizio Bertarelli; 22 September 1965 (age 60); Rome, Italy
- Education: Babson College; Harvard Business School
- Occupations: Chairman, B-Flexion; Co-Chair, Bertarelli Foundation
- Known for: Serono; Alinghi; B-Flexion; America's Cup; Bertarelli Foundation
- Spouse: Kirsty Roper (m. 2000; div. 2021)
- Children: 3
- Relatives: Dona Bertarelli (sister)

Ernesto Silvio Maurizio Bertarelli (born 22 September 1965) is an Italian-born Swiss billionaire businessman and philanthropist.

As of 2025, Swiss magazine Bilanz estimates the family fortune at CHF17.5 billion, whereas the Bloomberg Billionaires Index estimates the Bertarelli family's net worth of $39.3 billion as of 2026.

== Biography ==
Born in Rome to Italian parents, his family moved to Switzerland in 1977. He graduated from Babson College in 1989, and earned an MBA at Harvard Business School in 1993.

=== Career ===
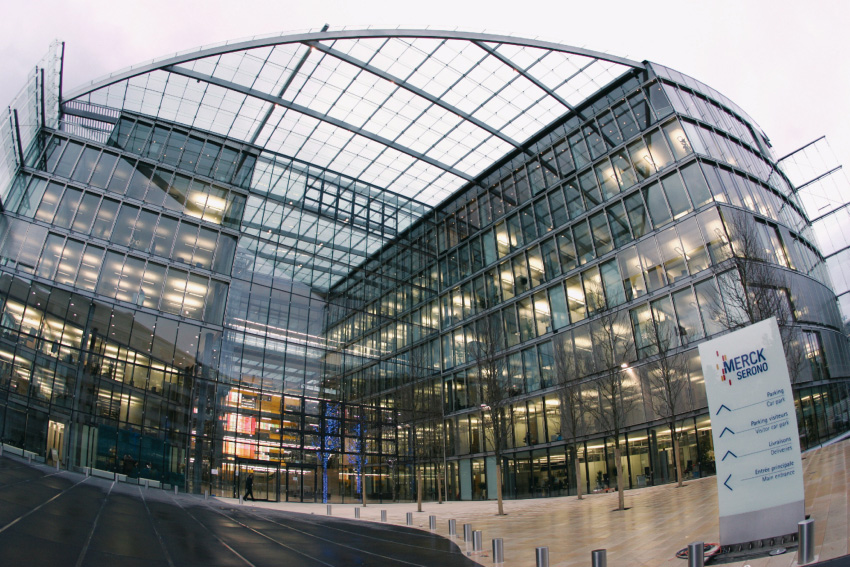
The former headquarters of Merck Serono in Geneva, which now hosts the Campus Biotech.

His grandfather, Pietro, joined Serono, a pharmaceutical company founded in 1906. In 1935 Pietro became the company's managing director, a position he was succeeded in by his son, Fabio Bertarelli, in 1965. Bertarelli became CEO in 1996 and, along with his sister Dona, inherited ownership in 1998 on the death of his father. Changing the company's focus from pharmaceuticals to biotechnology, revenues increased from $809 million in 1996 to $2.8 billion in 2006. The company gained fame from its discovery of a natural hormone used in the treatment of female infertility, and its treatments for multiple sclerosis and growth hormone deficiency.

Bertarelli and his family sold the company to Merck KGaA of Germany in January 2007 for US$13.3 billion, forming the new company Merck-Serono. His family split an estimated $9 billion stake at that time, which added to previous share sales when the company floated on the NY stock market in 2000, which is now invested mainly through his B-Flexion (formerly Waypoint Capital) investment vehicle. Bertarelli currently co-chairs – with his sister Dona – the Bertarelli Foundation which focuses on marine conservation and neuroscience research.

=== B-Flexion ===
Between 2002 and 2009, Bertarelli served as a board director of UBS AG. Management of the family's combined wealth is through B-Flexion, which invests through a number of separate specialist investment partnerships including such areas as real estate, technology, hedge funds and life sciences.

These businesses include Kedge Capital, an investment management group specialising in hedge funds and private equity; a UK real estate investment fund, Crosstree; and a technology fund, Forestay Capital.

B-Flexion, which is headquartered in Geneva with offices in London, Jersey, Boston and Dublin, also manages investment holdings itself, including an allergy immunotherapy group Stallergenes-Greer, Corium, Corium Pharma Solutions, a contract development and manufacturing company, and Paratek Pharmaceuticals, an antibiotic company. B-Flexion is shareholder owner in several asset management businesses, such as Longview Partners, Capital Four, Landfair Capital and Twelve Securis.

=== Campus Biotech ===
On 22 May 2013, it was announced that a consortium led by the Bertarelli family and comprising Hansjörg Wyss, the École Polytechnique Fédérale de Lausanne (EPFL) and the University of Geneva had been successful in their bid for the former Merck Serono site in Geneva, which had been put up for sale when that company announced in April 2012 that it would be closing its Geneva headquarters. The name of the joint initiative is Campus Biotech and the site became a ‘centre of excellence in the fields of healthcare, biotechnology and life sciences’. As part of this, the EPFL and the University of Geneva occupy some 15,000m2 of the site. In October 2013, it was announced that Campus Biotech was to be the core of a new Swiss neuroscience valley with the research groups involved in the Human Brain Project and the Blue Brain Project, as well as most scientists from the Center for Neuroprosthetics, moving there in 2014.

=== Sailing ===
His relationship with this sport is due to his youth spent in Monte Argentario. The name Alinghi derives from the Bertarelli family boats that sailed in the regatta fields around Porto Santo Stefano and Porto Ercole.

In 2000, Bertarelli founded the yachting syndicate Team Alinghi, which in 2003, representing the Société Nautique de Genève, won the Louis Vuitton Cup before beating Team New Zealand in Auckland to win the America's Cup. It was the first time a team had ever won the coveted sailing trophy on its first attempt, with the victory bringing the Cup to Europe for the first time. Team Alinghi hired sailors from many different nationalities, including Russell Coutts and Brad Butterworth, respectively skipper and tactician of Team New Zealand's 2000 crew. Bertarelli was Team Alinghi's only Swiss national serving as navigator in 2003 and subsequently as an afterguard runner and grinder in 2007, when Team Alinghi defended the America's Cup in Valencia. On July 3, 2007, Alinghi beat Team New Zealand in race 7 by 1 second to retain the America's Cup, winning the series 5–2.

In recognition of his success, in 2003 Bertarelli was named Chevalier de la Légion d'honneur by French President Jacques Chirac, and was given the Cavaliere di Gran Croce by Carlo Azeglio Ciampi, President of the Italian Republic.

Société Nautique de Genève and Bertarelli's efforts to organize the 33rd America's Cup following their 2007 victory in Alinghi were subject to numerous legal challenges by the Golden Gate Yacht Club. The race finally took place in February 2010, in Valencia, Spain. Bertarelli was the primary helmsman of his boat Alinghi 5, which lost both races against the challenger USA 17 by a considerable margin.

Alinghi returned to the competition in the 37th America’s Cup in 2024 in Barcelona, in partnership with Red Bull as Alinghi Red Bull Racing. The team reached the semi-finals but were beaten by the British team Ineos Britannia. In May 2025 the team announced that due to concerns over the governance and administration of the 38th America’s Cup that it would not be competing.

Alinghi competed in the Extreme Sailing Series, which it most recently won in 2016, and in the summer-long, one-class D35 championship on Lake Geneva. Since 2016 he is a member of America's Cup Hall of Fame.

=== Philanthropy ===
Bertarelli and his family established a foundation in 1999 for promoting research and development in the field of male and female infertility, assisted reproduction technologies, andrology, genetics and endocrinology; supporting training, education and international and national exchanges in these areas through grants. The Bertarelli Foundation, in Trelex, Switzerland, merged into the Foundation FABER, in Lausanne, in 2006, and since 2008 a renewed Bertarelli Foundation has regrouped the family's numerous philanthropic initiatives in the fields of charity, health, sciences, sport and culture.

Some projects recently sponsored by the Bertarelli Foundation have been the research Centre for Neuroprosthetics at the EPFL in Lausanne; the partnership with the British government to create the largest marine reserve in the world in Chagos, in the Indian Ocean; a joint research and education program in neuroscience between Harvard Medical School and EPFL; the Swiss Sailing Grants in partnership with the Swiss Sailing Federation; and the Henna Pre-School in South Africa and a partnership with the Stoke-on-Trent YMCA that was led by Kirsty Bertarelli.

Bertarelli is a member of the Harvard Medical School Board of Fellows. In 2023, Bertarelli pledged $75 million to Harvard Medical School to "advance scientific discovery and a culture of entrepreneurship".

=== Honorary doctorate ===
Bertarelli was awarded an Honorary Doctorate of Marine Sciences from Plymouth University in 2013.

=== Personal life ===
Bertarelli met Kirsty Roper, a former 1988 Miss UK and songwriter, while on holiday in Italy in 1997. The couple married in 2000, and have three children. The couple's divorce was announced in October 2021. The couple lived in Gstaad and also spent time in their house on the shores of Lake Geneva.

In December 2008, Appledore Shipbuilders launched the hull of Project55, Bertarelli's new yacht, which was completed as Vava II by Devonport Engineering Consortium Ltd at Plymouth in February 2012

The 2017 edition of the Sunday Times Rich List estimated the family's wealth at £11.5 billion, an increase of £1.72 billion since the previous year.

== Honour ==
- Italy: Knight Grand Cross of the Order of Merit of the Italian Republic (11 April 2003)

== See also ==
- Lists of billionaires
