= Russell Coutts =

New Zealand sailor (born 1962)

Sir Russell Coutts KNZM CBE
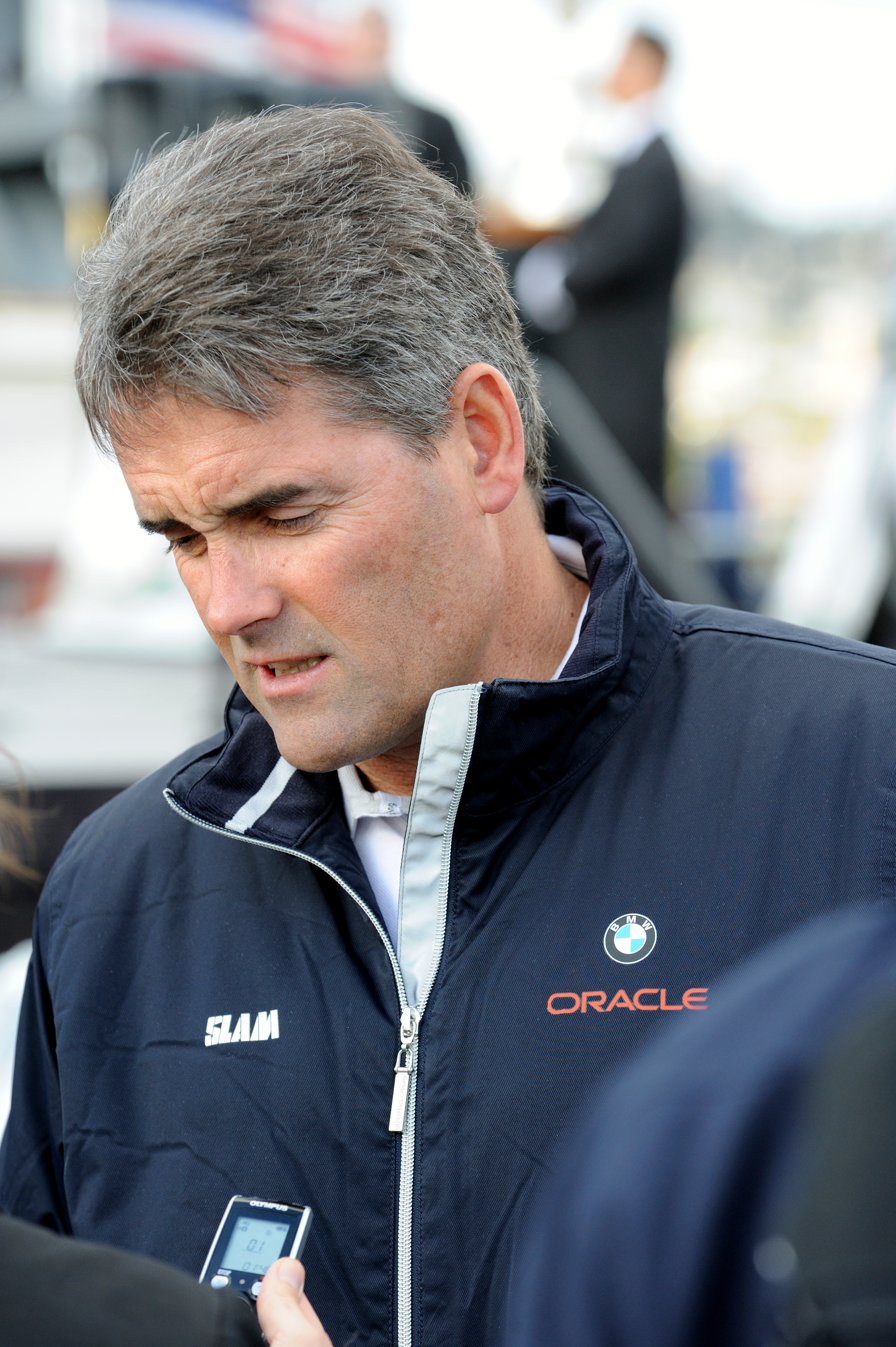
- Coutts in 2010

Personal information
- Born: 1 March 1962 (age 64) Wellington, New Zealand

Sailing career
- Sport: Sailing
- Classes: Finn, AC45
Medal record
Sailing
Representing New Zealand
Olympic Games
Gold medal – first place	1984 Los Angeles	Finn class

Sir Russell Coutts KNZM CBE (born 1 March 1962) is a world champion New Zealand yachtsman. He won an Olympic gold medal and skippered three Americas Cup victories in 1995, 2000, and 2003.

== Early life ==
Coutts was educated at Otago Boys' High School (1975–1979) and is a life member of Paremata Boating Club, where he learned to sail in a P class, and the Ravensbourne Boating Club. At the age of 17, he became national champion of New Zealand in the Laser class.

== Career ==
Coutts' achievements include a gold medal in the Finn class in the 1984 Olympic Games, winning the America's Cup five times, the ISAF World Youth championships, three World Match Racing Championships, numerous international match race wins and IOR, IMS and One Design World Championship victories. As skipper/helmsman in America's Cup racing, he has a perfect record with 15 wins and no losses (1995, 2000, 2003). He was CEO of the Oracle Team when it won the America's Cup twice with 14 wins and 16 losses (2010, 2013 and 2017 each time with James Spithill as skipper/helmsman).

=== RC44 series ===
In 2005 Slovenian designer Andrej Justin designed with input from him a new boat called the RC44, a high-performance one-design racer created for top-level racing in international regattas under strictly controlled Class Rules. The concept and the design features of the RC44 are dedicated to the amateur helmsmen racing in fleet racing sailing events.

=== SailGP series ===
Coutts along with American billionaire businessman Larry Ellison co-founded the SailGP professional series in October 2019.

In mid-March 2024, Coutts announced that SailGP would not return to Christchurch, New Zealand, in 2025 after the presence of endangered Hector's dolphins on the Lyttelton course led local authorities to cancel racing on 23 March. SailGP organisers had been expecting 22,000 people to attend the event. Coutts criticised "minority interests" particularly the Canterbury Harbourmaster, Department of Conservation, ECan (Environment Canterbury and local Māori iwi (tribe) Ngāti Wheke for what he called "extremely restrictive" protocols on racing. In response to Coutt's remarks, Te Hapū o Ngāti Wheke and the host city agency ChristchurchNZ defended their marine mammal management plan, with the former saying that SailGP had "knew what they signed up for when they decided to hold the event within a marine mammal sanctuary." University of Otago zoologist Professor emeritus Liz Slooten said it was normal for Hector's dolphins to swim in harbours in autumn and criticised the organisers for not hosting the race in winter. Similar sentiments were echoed by Auckland City Councillor Josephine Bartley and Greenpeace Aotearoa New Zealand Executive Director Russell Norman. By contrast, Coutts was defended by former National Party leader and Auckland Business Chamber CEO Simon Bridges who said that interest groups were opposing major events such as the SailGP race across the country. The Platform broadcaster Sean Plunket also made controversial remarks describing Hector's dolphins as the "Down syndrome kids of marine mammals."

In early May 2024, Newsroom reported that Coutts' SailGP was negotiating with the economic development agency ChristchurchNZ over future SailGP events being hosted by Lyttelton. The website also reported that an evening call with Coutts had led to an urgent board meeting at ChristchurchNZ.

=== America's Cup ===
- 1995 – 1995 Louis Vuitton Cup / Black Magic / San Diego / Winner (37 victories, 1 loss) – Skipper & Helmsman – 1995 America's Cup / Black Magic (Challenger) / San Diego / Winner (5 to 0) – Skipper & Helmsman
- 2000 – 2000 America’s Cup / Team New Zealand (Defender) / Auckland / Winner (5 to 0) – Skipper & Helmsman
- 2003 – 2003 Louis Vuitton Cup / Alinghi / Auckland / Winner (30 victories, 4 losses) – Skipper & Helmsman
  – 2003 America's Cup / Alinghi (Challenger) / Auckland / Winner (5 to 0) – Skipper & Helmsman
- 2010 2010 America's Cup / BMW Oracle Racing (Challenger) / Valencia / Winner (2 to 0) – Team Chief Executive Officer
- 2013 2013 America's Cup / Oracle Racing (Defender) / San Francisco, USA / Winner (9 to 8) – Team Chief Executive Officer

In July 2007, Coutts was named CEO and skipper of BMW Oracle Racing, sponsored by Golden Gate Yacht Club (GGYC), the United States Challenger to the 2010 America's Cup. He was involved in the pre-match litigation between the challengers Golden Gate Yacht Club and Société Nautique de Genève (SNG), in which the court decided that the GGYC was the rightful Challenger of Record. Cup Defender SNG's team was Alinghi. Coutts' yacht USA beat the defending yacht Alinghi 5 by considerable margins in both races.

Most observers stated that USA 17's rigid wing sail had given it a decisive advantage.

Coutts again led the Oracle Team as CEO in the next America's Cup match against Emirates Team New Zealand. This match took place in the bay of San Francisco in September 2013. Oracle managed to come back from 8 races to 1 by winning the following 8 races and to defend the cup in the longest America's cup match ever. Both skipper James Spithill and team owner Larry Ellison praised Coutts' role in the defense of the oldest trophy in sports history.

=== World Championships ===
Year	Competition	Venue	Position	Event
1981	World Youth Sailing		1st	
1983	Finn Gold Cup	Milwaukee, USA	13th	Finn class
1984	Finn Gold Cup	Anzio, Italy	7th	Finn class
1989	IYRU Match Racing World Championship	Lymington, UK	7th	Match racing
1990	Soling World Championship	Medemblik, Netherlands	8th	Soling class
1990	IYRU Match Racing World Championship	Auckland, New Zealand	5th	Match racing
1991	IYRU Match Racing World Championship	Hamilton, Bermuda	3rd	Match racing
1992	IYRU Match Racing World Championship	Long Beach, USA	1st	Match racing
1993	IYRU Match Racing World Championship	Perth, Australia	1st	Match racing
1996	ISAF Open Match Racing World Championship	Dubrovnik, Croatia	1st	Match racing
1998	Etchells World Championship	Marblehead, USA	2nd	Etchells class
2001	12 Metre World Championship	Cowes, UK	1st	12 Metre Grand Prix class
2001	Farr 40 World Championships	Cowes, UK	1st	Farr 40 class
2003	Farr 40 World Championship	Porto Cervo, Italy	4th	Farr 40 class
2003	ISAF Open Match Racing World Championship	Riva del Garda, Italy	6th	Match racing
2005	Melges 24 World Championship	Key Largo, USA	28th	Melges 24 class
2006	Farr 40 World Championship	Newport, USA	1st	Farr 40 class
2008	TP52 World Championship	Lanzarote, Spain	4th	TP52 class
2010	Melges 32 World Championship	San Francisco, USA	7th	Melges 32 class
2010	RC44 World Championship	Puerto Calero, Spain	2nd	RC44 class

As of 27 September 2015

=== Olympic Games ===
He competed twice at the Olympics:

- In the 1984 Olympic Games held in Los Angeles, USA he sailed the Finn class winning a Gold Medal
- In the 1992 Olympic Games held in Barcelona, Spain he finished 8th in the Soling class

=== Other events ===
- 1993 – Admiral's Cup / Pinta / /Winner
- 2006 – Bol d'Or Rolex / Decision 35 / Team Banque Gonet / Switzerland / Winner
  – World Champion / Farr 40 / Vincenzo Onorato Team / Newport, U.S.
- 2007 – Globals / TP 52 / Team Artemis
- 2008 – Cagliari RC44 Cup, Match Racing / RC44 / BMW ORACLE Racing / Cagliari, Italy / Winner
  – TP 52 Audi MedCup / TP 52 / Team USA 17 / Winner
  – Malcesine SLAM Cup, Match Racing / RC44 / BMW ORACLE Racing / Malcesine, Italy / Winner

== Personal life ==
Coutts has been married twice and has four children. His son, Grayson, was previously in a relationship with journalist David Farrier.

In 2021, Coutts criticised the New Zealand government's response to COVID-19 and suggested that the government was acting like a dictatorship by establishing vaccine mandates and enforcing managed isolation. In 2022, he announced that he would be attending the anti-mandate protest in Wellington.

== Awards ==
In New Zealand, Coutts was honoured with appointment as a Member of the Order of the British Empire (MBE) in the 1985 New Year Honours and then elevation to the rank of Commander of the Order of the British Empire (CBE) in the 1995 Queen's Birthday Honours, in both instances for services to yachting. He was made a Distinguished Companion of the New Zealand Order of Merit (DCNZM) in the 2000 Queen's Birthday Honours "for services to yachting, especially the 2000 America's Cup challenge", and redesignated as a Knight Companion of the New Zealand Order of Merit (KNZM) in August 2009.

Coutts has been named ISAF Sailor of the Year twice. Other awards include:

- 1984 – New Zealand Yachtsman of the Year
- 1994 – Silbernes Lorbeerblatt, German National Award
- 1995 – Sperry World Sailor of the Year
- 1995 – Halberg Award
- 1995 – ISAF World Sailor of the Year Award
- 1996 – America's Cup Hall of Fame
- 1996 – World Trophy for Oceania
- 2003 – ISAF Rolex World Sailor of the Year Award
