= Brad Butterworth =

New Zealand Yacht Racer

Brad Butterworth OBE
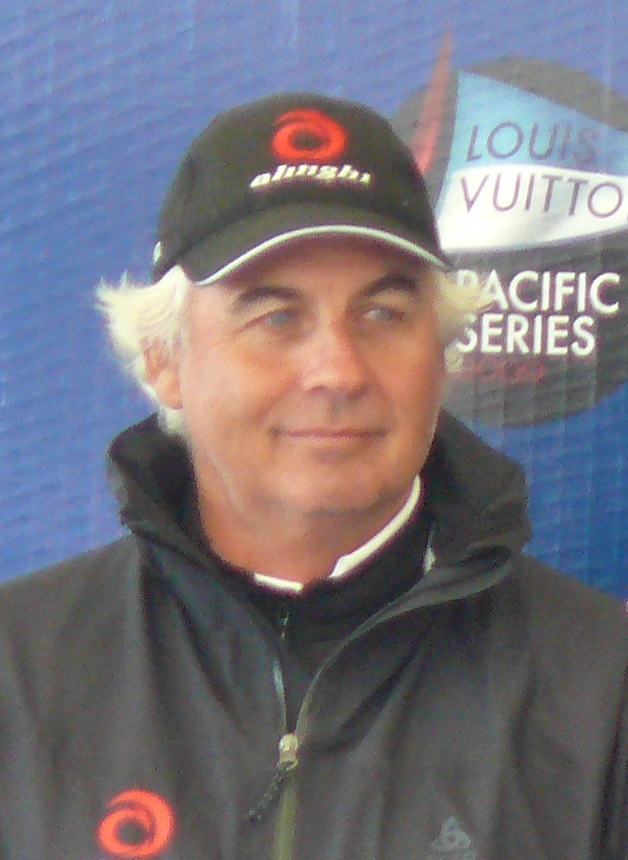
- Butterworth in 2009

Personal information
- Full name: Bradley William Butterworth
- Born: 1959 (age 66–67) Te Awamutu, New Zealand
Medal record
Sailing
Representing New Zealand
World Championships
Silver medal – second place	2013 Isle of Wight	Swan 60
Silver medal – second place	2007 Copenhagen	Farr 40
Silver medal – second place	1998 Marblehead	Etchells

Bradley William Butterworth OBE (born 1959) is a New Zealand yachtsman known for the role he played as tactician and skipper in the America's Cup for Team New Zealand and the Alinghi team of Switzerland.

Butterworth was born in Te Awamutu, New Zealand, in 1959. He has been sailing since age six.

Butterworth has sailed and been successful in many international sailing competitions, including the Admiral's Cup, the Kenwood Cup, the Sydney to Hobart Race, the Fastnet Race, the Whitbread Round The World Race and the America's Cup.

1987 was a busy year as he was the skipper of the top-ranked Admiral's Cup boat Propaganda when New Zealand won the Admiral's Cup in England.

He was also a watch captain on Steinlager II with Peter Blake when she won the 1989–90 Whitbread Round The World Race and skipper of a Whitbread 60 (later Volvo Ocean 60) class boat in the 1993/1994 race where he was associated with Dennis Conner and Tom Whidden.

In the 1995 Queen's Birthday Honours, Butterworth was appointed an Officer of the Order of the British Empire, for services to yachting.

After the successful defense of the America's Cup in Auckland in 2000 the then skipper, Russell Coutts, tactician Butterworth and several other members of the New Zealand team moved to the Alinghi team. They then won the America's Cup in 2003, beating Team New Zealand 5–0 in waters near Auckland. He was inducted into the America's Cup Hall of Fame in 2004. After Russell Coutts left Alinghi in March 2005, Butterworth became skipper himself and went on to win the 2007 America's Cup in Valencia, again beating Team New Zealand, this time 5–2.

In October 2009, Butterworth published an open letter commenting on the extensive litigation concerning the 33rd America's Cup. According to him, winning the America's Cup is akin to climbing the K2 mountain: something that only the top sportsmen in their field can achieve. He says: "Great sportsmen seek victory on the field of play, or in our sport; on the high seas. A sportsman seeking to win through the courts or through what Dennis called the 'backdoor' only demeans themselves as sportsmen and taints any victory, as well as the sport. Having challenged for and defended the America’s Cup successfully, I have always found it has been won by designing and building the fastest boat and sailing with the best team. It is hard to win, as it should be for such a trophy. Reducing the challenge might make the conquest easier, but gone is the attraction and achievement."

Butterworth was the skipper for the defending team Alinghi in the 2010 America's Cup. His yacht Alinghi 5 lost to the challenging yacht USA 17 by a considerable margin. Most observers stated that USA 17's rigid wing sail had given it a decisive advantage.

Butterworth led a campaign on NUMBERS, a 66-foot race boat designed by Alinghi Head of Design Team, Rolf Vrolijk and owned by American Daniel Meyers in 2007 and 2008 that resulted in winning; the maxi boat world championship in Sardinia, Cork Race Week in Ireland, and in the US, the New York Yacht Club annual regatta, the Palm Beach Race, the Lambert Ocean Race and the Palm Beach Race, Key West Race Week.
