= Alinghi =

Sailing competition syndicate

- Alinghi

Career
- Yacht club: Société Nautique de Genève
- Established: 1994
- Nation: Switzerland
- Team principal(s): Ernesto Bertarelli
- Skipper: Ernesto Bertarelli
- Notable victories: 2003 Louis Vuitton Cup; 2003 America's Cup; 2007 America's Cup; 8 times D35 Trophy; 7 times Bol d'Or; 4 times Extreme Sailing Series; 2019 GC32 World Champion and GC32 Racing Tour winner

Yachts
- Sail no.: Boat name
- SUI–64: SUI 64
- SUI–91: SUI 91
- SUI–100: SUI 100
- SUI: Alinghi 5

Alinghi, or Alinghi Red Bull Racing because of the sports marketing branding by Red Bull, is the competitive sailing syndicate set up by Ernesto Bertarelli, racing under the colors of the Société Nautique de Genève, to challenge for the America's Cup, and other competitions. Bertarelli had raced several smaller yachts named Alinghi previously, but 2003 was his first attempt at the America's Cup. Alinghi challenged for and won the 2003 America's Cup in Auckland, New Zealand and successfully defended it at the 2007 America's Cup in Valencia, Spain. Alinghi lost the America's Cup to the Golden Gate Yacht Club and their team BMW Oracle Racing in a Deed of Gift match in Valencia, Spain in February 2010.

For the 2003 event, Team New Zealand as the holder of the America's Cup, in consultation with Prada, the Challenger of Record, removed the nationality rule that stipulated that all of the crew members must be nationals of the challenging syndicate.

Alinghi took full advantage of this rule change and hired many of the world's top America's Cup sailors particularly from New Zealand. New Zealanders saw the defection of key members of Team New Zealand to Alinghi as an act of disloyalty to their home country—understandable against a background of strong nationwide public support for Team New Zealand that they saw as representing their country rather than just representing the Royal New Zealand Yacht Squadron.

After a series of discussions with Team New Zealand it was announced that they would compete in the Louis Vuitton Pacific Series in 2009.

In July 2010, it appeared that the team was being disbanded and would not compete in future America's Cups. On 26 November 2010, Alinghi formally confirmed that it would not participate in the 2013 America's Cup.

In December 2021 Ernesto Bertarelli announced the launch of the new Alinghi Red Bull Racing to compete in the 37th America's Cup. Arnaud Psarofaghis will serve as Skipper.

== America's Cup ==
=== 2003 challenge ===
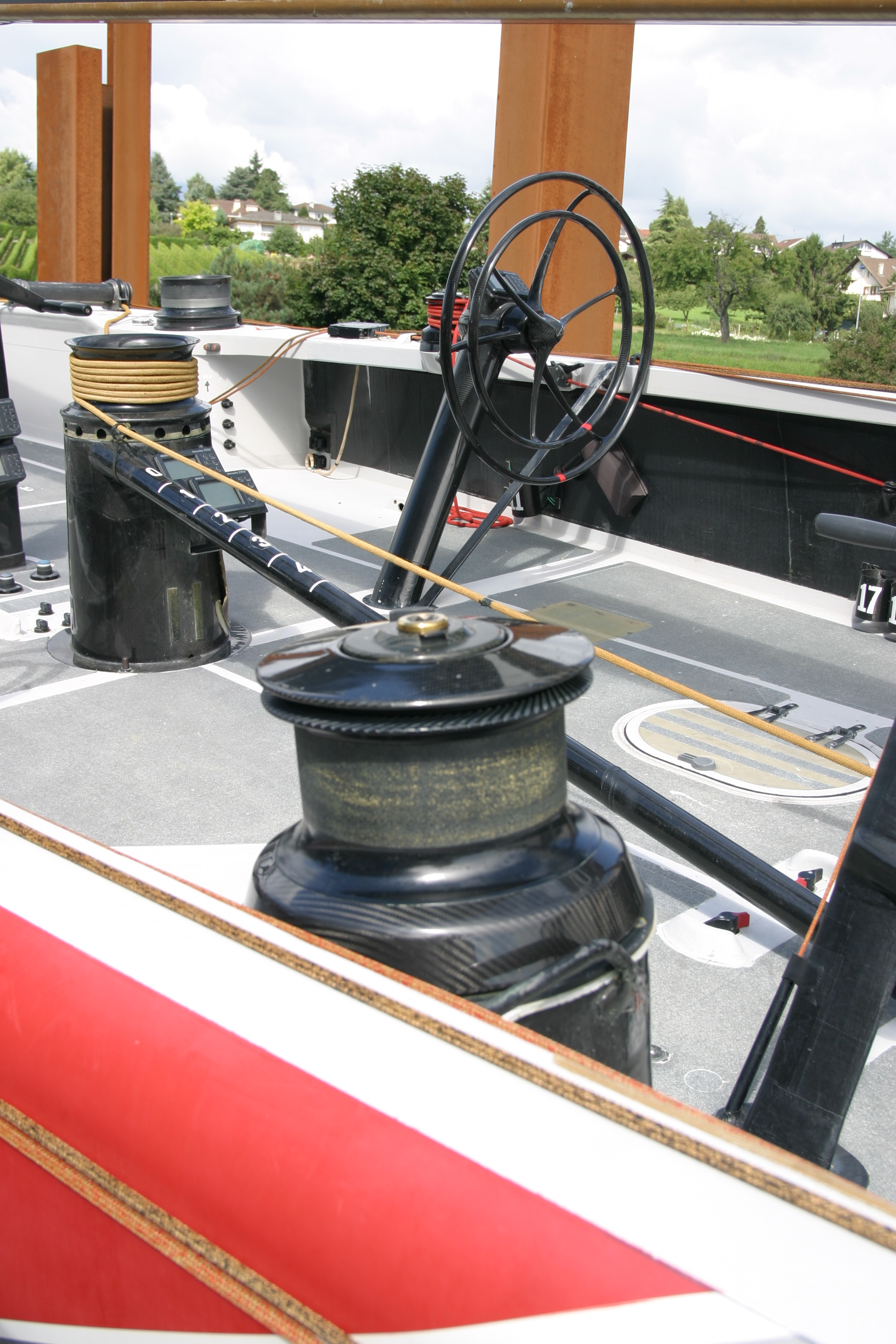

Coinciding with the change in the nationality rules concerning the crew and in order to maximize the chances of success, Alinghi hired Russell Coutts, the successful skipper and helmsman of Team New Zealand. Coutts had already won the America's Cup for New Zealand in 1995 and successfully defended for New Zealand in 2000. Along with Coutts came several other important Kiwi sailors, including Team New Zealand tactician Brad Butterworth. Grant Simmer, another America's Cup veteran, joined as managing director and head of design. Bertarelli, the syndicate's president, served as navigator during the racing.

Apart from New Zealand, the Alinghi team consisted of members from Germany, the United States, Canada, the Netherlands, France, Italy, Spain, the U.S. Virgin Islands, Portugal, Turkey, Ireland, the UK (from Scotland and Wales), Belgium, South Africa, Australia, Uruguay, Argentina, Denmark, Ecuador, and Switzerland.

The Alinghi boats for the 2003 challenge, SUI-64 (the race boat) and the SUI-75, were developed specifically for the race by the Alinghi team in close collaboration with the École Polytechnique Fédérale de Lausanne. Alinghi also had a test yacht from the 2000 America's cup, SUI-59 (formerly called Fast 2000).

Alinghi raced to a 5–0 victory against Team New Zealand on 2 March 2003, winning the America's Cup.

They guaranteed themselves a further stake in the history books by becoming the first team since the inaugural race in 1851 to return the America's Cup to Europe and for being the first team to win the Cup on its first attempt.

Alinghi's stated vision was "to win the America's Cup, while earning respect and recognition as a world class sports team as well as sharing our passion".

Due to this victory, Team Alinghi received one of the highest honors in sport, the Olympic Cup in 2004. The Coupe Olympique is an award given annually by the International Olympic Committee.

=== 2007 defense ===
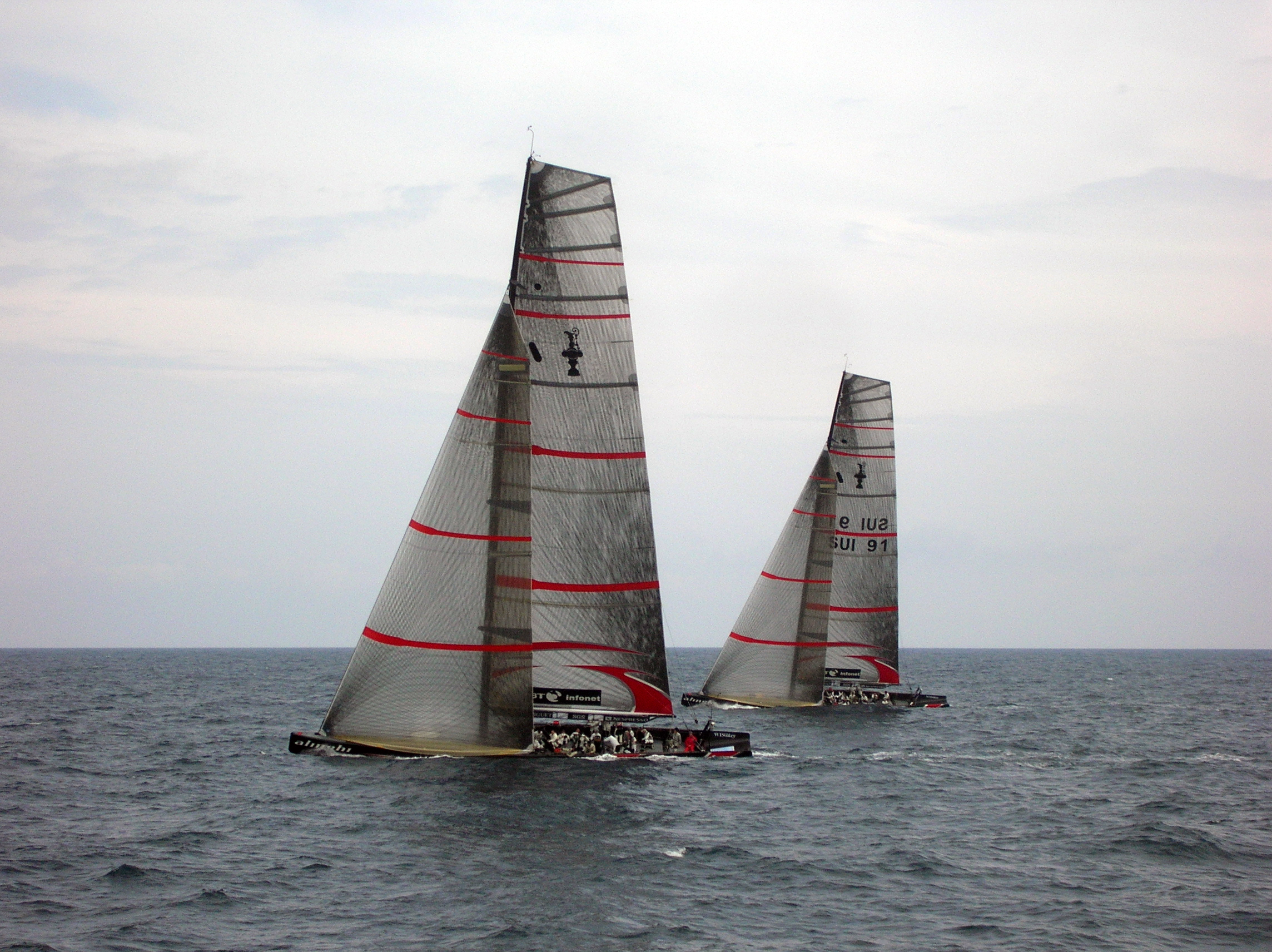
The boats SUI 91 and SUI 100.

Team Alinghi fired its skipper Russell Coutts on 27 April 2004. Immediately beforehand, Alinghi (via America's Cup Management) changed the America's Cup Rules to prevent any team members from moving between teams until the completion of the 2007 America's Cup. Alinghi, as the then current holders of the America's Cup, were fully entitled to change the rule. Nine months later the conflict was ended with a short statement.

The sailing team was extended again and was led for the 2007 campaign by Brad Butterworth, Alinghi's tactician and vice-president. Butterworth was highly experienced in America's Cup racing having sailed aboard the winning boat in the three previous competitions. Butterworth's team had many world-class sailors including Peter Holmberg, Ed Baird, Juan Vila, Jordi Calafat, Warwick Fleury, Simon Daubney, and Murray Jones. Jochen Schümann, winner of four Olympic medals, was the sports director for the sailing team.

Alinghi participated in all Louis Vuitton Acts, along with the 11 challengers from nine nations, before defending the America's Cup during the Match Race in June 2007. UBS, and BT Infonet renewed their commitment to the team as Main Partners for the next four years, along with Audemars Piguet, SGS, Nespresso, MSC Cruises, WISeKey and North Sails as co sponsors. Alinghi's first America's Cup defeat came on 24 June 2007 when they were defeated by Emirates Team New Zealand in the second race of the 2007 America's Cup off Valencia.

After a series of close races between the seemingly closely matched competitors, Alinghi won their final race against Emirates Team New Zealand on 3 July 2007, defending the America's Cup with five wins to Team New Zealand's two.

=== 2010 defense ===
America's Cup Management announced on 5 July 2007 that the protocol for the 2010 America's Cup had been agreed between the defending yacht club, Société Nautique de Genève of Switzerland, and the Challenger of Record, the Club Náutico Español de Vela of Spain. However this arrangement did not survive a legal challenge from BMW Oracle Racing, who successfully argued that Club Náutico Español de Vela was not a valid Challenger of Record due to non-compliance with the terms of the America's Cup Deed of Gift. Swiss based companies WISeKey and Hublot were the two primary sponsors of Alinghi's 2010 defense.

After extensive court action, Golden Gate Yacht Club (whose team is BMW Oracle Racing) was declared Challenger of Record and sailed against Alinghi in a Deed of Gift match in February 2010 at Valencia, Spain. The competing boats, Alinghi 5 and USA 17, were both 90-foot multihulls. USA 17's rigid wing sail provided a decisive advantage and Golden Gate Yacht Club won the 2010 America's Cup two races to none.

=== 2024 challenge ===
On 14 December 2021 Alinghi announced a joint-venture with Red Bull. Alinghi founder Ernesto Bertarelli and two-time Olympic champion Hans-Peter Steinacher announced the launch of the new Alinghi Red Bull Racing and presented its logo at the Société Nautique de Genève.

Arnaud Psarofaghis will serve as Skipper.

=== 2027 challenge ===
On 22 December 2025, Alinghi announced its entry for the 38th America's Cup with Tudor Watches as title sponsor, as well as its position as a founding partner in the newly established America's Cup Partnership.

== D35 Trophy, Bol d'Or, Extreme Sailing Series, GC32 Racing Tour ==
=== Bol d'Or ===
| Year | Boat | Skipper | Time |
|---|---|---|---|
| 1997 | Trimaran | Ernesto Bertarelli; Pierre-Yves Jorand | 6h 54m 09s |
| 2000 | Catamaran | Ernesto Bertarelli; Pierre-Yves Jorand | 6h 15m 56s |
| 2001 | Catamaran | Ernesto Bertarelli; Pierre-Yves Jorand | 8h 57m 11s |
| 2002 | Catamaran | Ernesto Bertarelli | 12h 07m 34s |
| 2003 | Catamaran | Ernesto Bertarelli | 9h 56m 53s |
| 2011 | Décision 35 | Ernesto Bertarelli | 6h 25m 50s |
| 2017 | Décision 35 | Ernesto Bertarelli; Arnaud Psarofaghis | 5h 11m 00s |

=== Decision 35 Trophy ===
| Year | Skipper | Place |
|---|---|---|
| 2004 | Ernesto Bertarelli | 3rd |
| 2005 | Ernesto Bertarelli | 2nd |
| 2006 | Ernesto Bertarelli | 2nd |
| 2007 | Ernesto Bertarelli | 1st |
| 2008 | Ernesto Bertarelli | 1st |
| 2009 | Ernesto Bertarelli | 1st |
| 2010 | Ernesto Bertarelli | 2nd |
| 2011 | Ernesto Bertarelli | 2nd |
| 2012 | Ernesto Bertarelli | 2nd |
| 2013 | Ernesto Bertarelli | 1st |
| 2014 | Ernesto Bertarelli | 1st |
| 2015 | Ernesto Bertarelli | 2nd |
| 2016 | Ernesto Bertarelli | 2nd |
| 2017 | Ernesto Bertarelli | 1st |
| 2018 | Ernesto Bertarelli | 1st |
| 2019 | Ernesto Bertarelli | 1st |

Alinghi has also competed in the Extreme Sailing Series (winning it four times) and in the GC32 Racing Tour (winning it one time) and was GC32 World Champion in 2019.
