= Jimmy Spithill =

Australian sailor (born 1979)

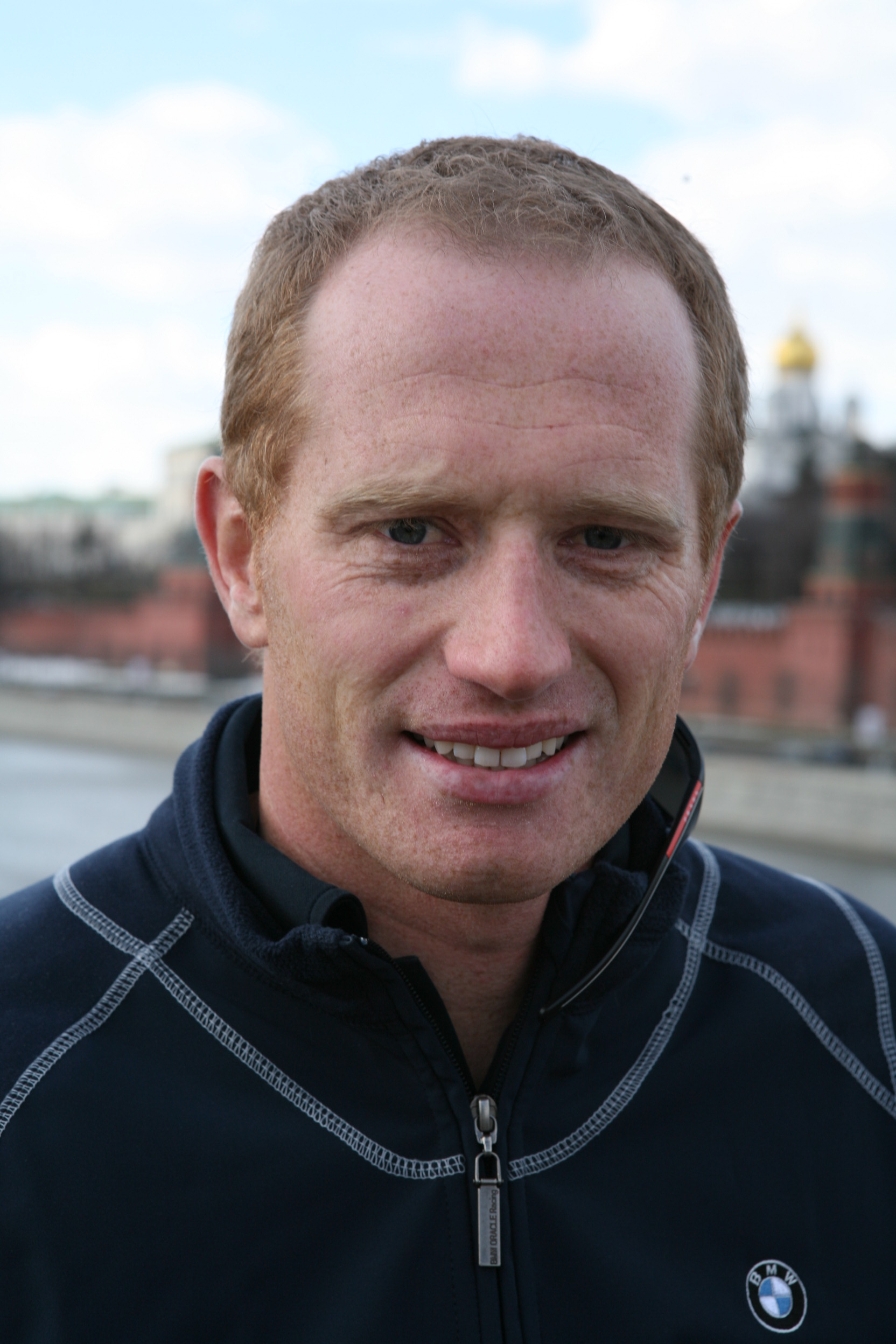

Personal information
- Born: James Spithill; 28 June 1979 (age 47) Sydney, Australia
- Spouse: Jennifer Spithill

Sailing career
- Sport: Sailing
- Club: CYCA (1998–2000); SYC (2001–2003); YCI (2004–2007); GGYC (2008–2017); CVS (2018–)
Medal record
Sailing
Representing Australia
World Championships
Gold medal – first place	2005 Sydney	Match racing
Gold medal – first place	2010 Sydney	RC44
Sailing
Representing United States
America's Cup
First place	2013 San Francisco	AC72
First place	2010 Valencia	USA 17
SailGP
Bronze medal – third place	Season 2 - 2021/22	F50

James Spithill (born 28 June 1979) is an Australian yachtsman.

In 2010, as skipper and helmsman for BMW Oracle Racing, Spithill won the America's Cup. He defended the cup twice, both times against Emirates Team New Zealand, first successfully in 2013, when Oracle Team USA came back from a −2 penalty score at the start to win 9–8 on the final race; and unsuccessfully in the 2017 America's Cup held in Bermuda.

In 2017, Spithill skippered LDV Comanche to win Line Honours in the Rolex Sydney Hobart Yacht Race. This win came after winning their protest against Wild Oats.

In the 36th America's Cup he was one of two helmsmen on the Luna Rossa Prada Pirelli boat. Luna Rossa won the Prada Cup and lost in the Americas Cup Finals.

In 2024 Spithill was inducted into the Australian Sailing Hall of Fame.

== Career ==
After some junior match race titles, in 1998 he arrived third in the Sydney-Hobart and first in the Kenwood Cup. He confirmed his ability by winning numerous races in the following years, including twice the Nations Cup (2003 and 2004), and obtaining a second place in the 2003 Match Race World Championship - and first place in 2005.

=== America's Cup ===
He debuted in the America's Cup in 2000 with Young Australia, showing his precocious talent despite leading an antiquated boat. At the age of 20, he was the youngest helmsman in the America's Cup.

In 2003 he led OneWorld in the America's Cup, reaching the semifinal of the Louis Vuitton Cup, where he was beaten by Oracle BMW Racing.

For the 2007 America's Cup, Spithill was chosen by Francesco De Angelis, whom he had beaten in the 2003 Louis Vuitton quarter-finals, as his heir as helmsman of Luna Rossa Challenge. Spithill was a mainstay of the team, which he led to the final of the Louis Vuitton Cup 2007 after beating one of the favourites, Oracle BMW Racing, 5–1 in the semifinals. He earned the nickname of "James Pitbull" among Italian fans because of his aggressive tactics during the pre-start phase of the races. He is the protagonist of what is arguably remembered as the greatest pre-start in the history of the America's Cup, forcing two penalties to BMW Oracle skipper Chris Dickson in race five of the Louis Vuitton Cup 2007, causing Dickson's resignation a few days later. Spithill went on to lose 5–0 to Emirates Team New Zealand in the 2007 Louis Vuitton Cup final.

In 2010, as skipper and helmsman for BMW Oracle Racing, Spithill was at the time the youngest ever winner of the America's Cup (30 years 7 months) until 2021 when Peter Burling at 30 years 2 months became the youngest skipper to win the America's Cup. Spithill was the helmsman and skipper for the challenging team BMW Oracle Racing 90 in the 2010 America's Cup. His yacht USA 17 beat the defending yacht Alinghi 5 by a considerable margin. Most observers stated that USA 17's rigid wing sail had given it a decisive advantage.

He successfully defended in 2013, when Oracle Team USA came back from a −2 penalty score at the start (awarded due to illegal boat modifications in the prior America's Cup World Series) to win 9–8 against Emirates Team New Zealand on the final race.

In the 2017 America's Cup defence held in Bermuda, he also led Oracle Team USA, but lost eight races to one.

In March 2018, it was announced that Jimmy Spithill would join the Challenger of Record entry, Luna Rossa Challenge, for the 36th Americas Cup series. As one of two helmsmen, he steered the boat on starboard tack while Francesco Bruni steered the boat on port tack. Luna Rossa won the Prada Cup and lost in the Americas Cup Finals to Team New Zealand in March 2021.

Following defeat in the 2024 Louis Vuitton cup final against Ineos Brittana he announced his retirement from Americas Cup racing. That same year, he became one of the co-founders of the Red Bull Italy SailGP Team, the Italian team competing in the SailGP championship, where he also took on the role of CEO.

== Incidents ==
On 6 October 2012, while at the helm of the Oracle USA AC45 yacht, Spithill managed to pitch-pole it. At the helm of the Oracle USA AC72 yacht during a practice run on 16 October 2012, Spithill pitch-poled it again. The subsequent capsizing caused US$2 million worth of damage to the $10 million vessel.

== Personal life ==
Spithill is married to Jennifer Spithill. They have two sons.

== Works and publications ==
- Spithill, Jimmy; Mundle, Rob (2017). Chasing the Cup: My America's Cup Journey. London: Adlard Coles Nautical, an imprint of Bloomsbury Publishing Plc. ISBN 978-1-472-94807-6. OCLC 1002726176.
