= Wingsail =

Variable-camber aerodynamic structure

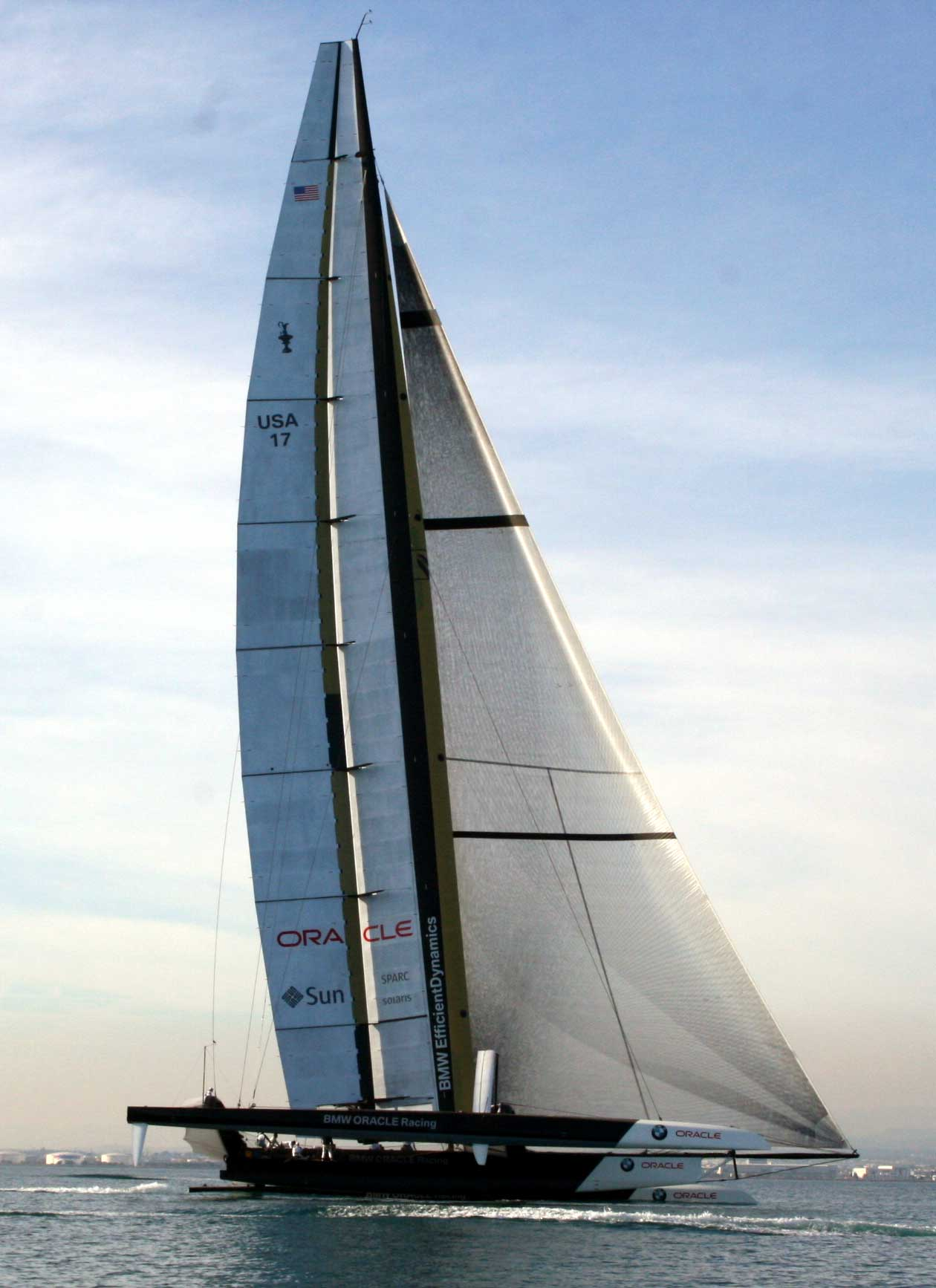
BMW Oracle Racing USA 17 from the 2010 America's Cup, with a rigid mainsail wingsail, and a conventional jib at the fore

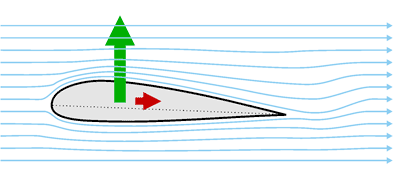
Forces on a wing (green = lift, red = drag).

A wingsail, twin-skin sail or double skin sail is a variable-camber aerodynamic structure that is fitted to a marine vessel in place of conventional sails. Wingsails are analogous to airplane wings, except that they are designed to provide lift on either side to accommodate being on either tack. Whereas wings adjust camber with flaps, wingsails adjust camber with a flexible or jointed structure (for hard wingsails). Wingsails are typically mounted on an unstayed spar—often made of carbon fiber for lightness and strength. The geometry of wingsails provides more lift, and a better lift-to-drag ratio, than traditional sails. Wingsails are more complex and expensive than conventional sails.

== Introduction ==
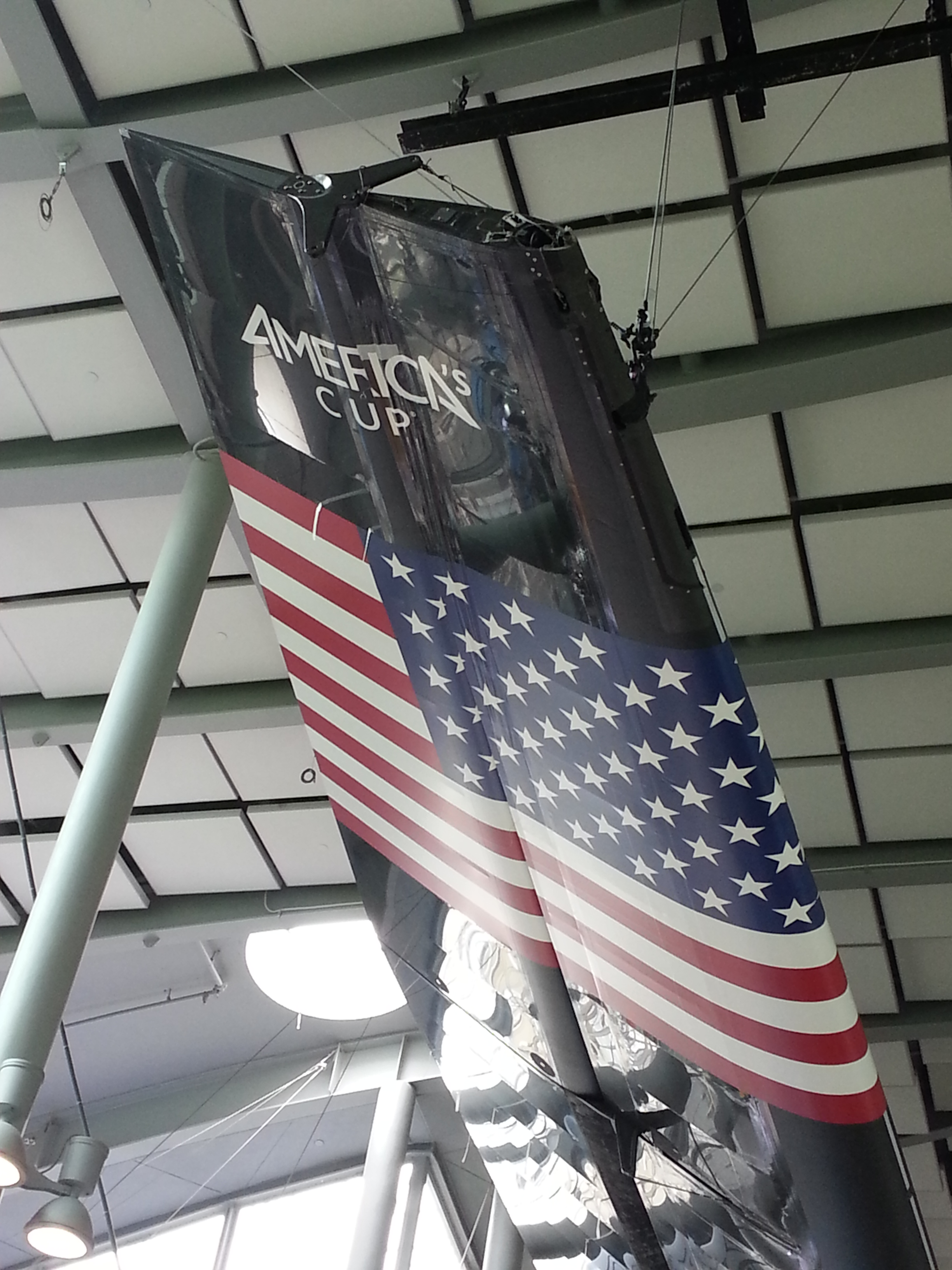
The top of the wing of an Oracle AC45 racing catamaran

Wingsails are of two basic constructions that create an airfoil, "soft" and "hard", both mounted on an unstayed rotating mast. Whereas hard wingsails are rigid structures that are stowed only upon removal from the boat, soft wingsails can be furled or stowed on board.

L. Francis Herreshoff pioneered a precursor rig that had jib and main, each with a two-ply sail with leading edges attached to a rotating spar. The C Class Catamaran class has been experimenting and refining wingsails in a racing context since the 60s. Englishman, John Walker, explored the use of wingsails in cargo ships and developed the first practical application for sailing yachts in the 1990s. Wingsails have been applied to small vessels, like the Optimist dinghy and Laser, to cruising yachts, and most notably to high-performance multihull racing sailboats, like USA-17. The smallest craft have a unitary wing that is manually stepped. Cruising rigs have a soft rig that can be lowered, when not in use. High-performance rigs are often assembled of rigid components and must be stepped (installed) and unstepped by shore-side equipment.

== Camber adjustment ==
Cross section of an aerofoil showing camber line.

Wingsails change camber (the asymmetry between the top and the bottom surfaces of the aerofoil), depending on tack and wind speed. A wingsail becomes more efficient with greater curvature on the downwind side. Since the windward side changes with each tack, so must sail curvature change. This happens passively on a conventional sail, as it fills in with wind on each tack. On a wingsail, a change in camber requires a mechanism. Wingsails also change camber to adjust for windspeed. On an aircraft, flaps increase the camber or curvature of the wing, raising the maximum lift coefficient—the lift a wing can generate—at lower air speeds (speed of the air passing over it). A wingsail has the same need for camber adjustment, as windspeed changes—a straighter camber curvature as windspeed increases, more curved as it decreases.

Mechanisms for camber adjustment are similar for soft and hard wingsails. Each employs independent leading and trailing airfoil segments that are adjusted independently for camber. More sophisticated rigs allow for variable adjustment of camber with height above the water to account for increased windspeed.

== Comparison with conventional sailing rigs ==
The presence of rigging, supporting the mast of a conventional fore-and-aft rig limits sail geometry to shapes that are less efficient than the narrow chord of the wingsail. However, conventional sails are simple to adjust for windspeed by reefing. Wingsails typically are a fixed surface area. Conventional sails can be furled easily; some flexible wingsails can be dropped, when not in use; rigid wingsails must be removed when exposure to wind is undesirable.

=== Points of sail ===
Nielsen summarised the efficiencies of wingsails, compared with conventional sails, for different points of sail, as follows:

- Close-hauled: At 30° apparent wind, the wingsail has a 10-degree angle of attack and more lift, compared to the conventional sail plan and its angles of attack of 15° for the jib and 20° for the mainsail.
- Beam reach: At 90° apparent wind, the wingsail, positioned across the boat, functions efficiently as a wing, providing forward lift, whereas the jib of the conventional sail plan suffers from being difficult to shape as a wing (the main sail is still relatively efficient).
- Broad reach: At 135° apparent wind, the wingsail may be eased in such a manner that it still functions efficiently as a wing, whereas the jib and main sail no longer provide lift—instead they present themselves perpendicular to the wind and provide force from drag only.
