= Deed of gift =

Legal document that transfers ownership of real, personal, or intellectual property

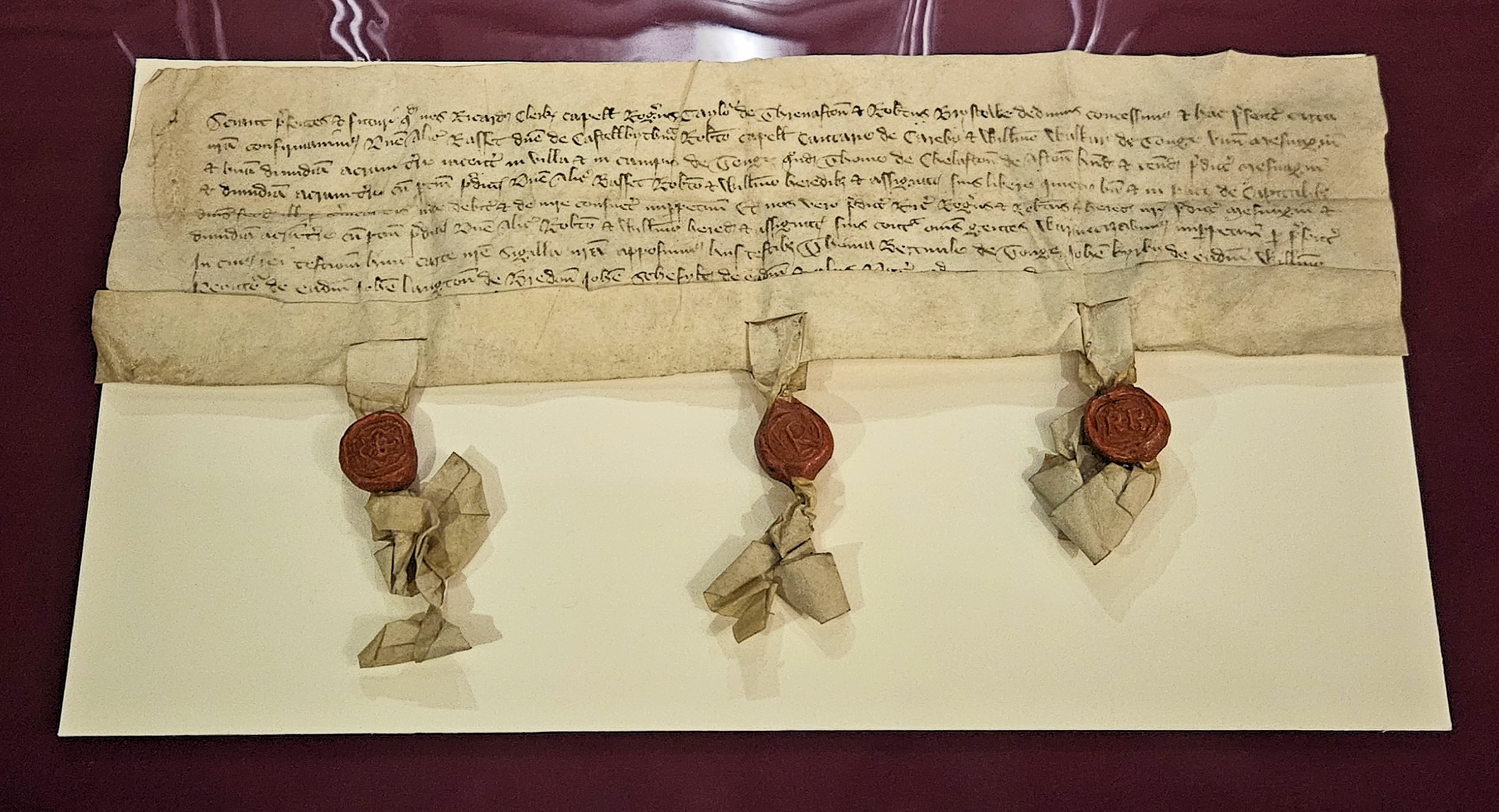
13th century Deed of Gift

A deed of gift is a signed legal document that voluntarily and without recompense transfers ownership of real, personal, or intellectual property—such as a gift of materials—from one person or institution to another. It should include any possible conditions restricting access, use, or preservation of the gift.

== See also ==
- Deed of Gift of the America's Cup
- Gift (law)
