= 2010 America's Cup =

33rd America's Cup
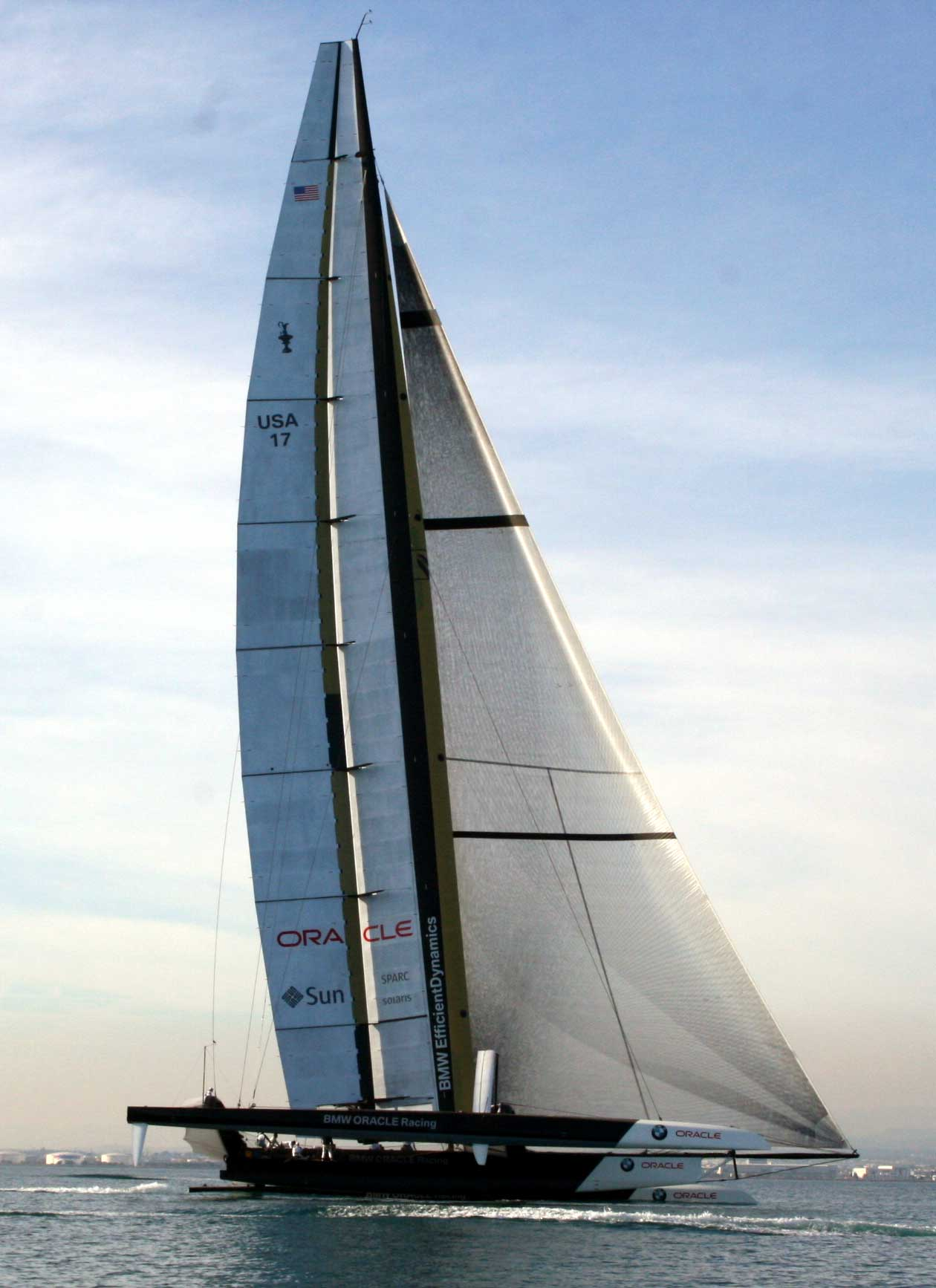
- BMW Oracle racing USA-17 training off the coast of Valencia, Spain in late January 2010

Defender Switzerland
- Defender club: Société Nautique de Genève
- Yacht: Alinghi 5

Challenger United States
- Challenger club: Golden Gate Yacht Club
- Yacht: USA 17

Competition
- Location: Port America's Cup, Valencia, Spain
- 39°28′N 0°18.5′W
- Dates: 8–14 February 2010
- Rule: Deed of Gift match
- Winner: Golden Gate Yacht Club
- Score: 2–0

The 33rd America's Cup between Société Nautique de Genève defending with team Alinghi against Golden Gate Yacht Club, and their racing team BMW Oracle Racing was the subject of extensive court action and litigation, surpassing in acrimony even the controversial 1988 America's Cup. Since the two parties were unable to agree otherwise, the match took place as a one-on-one deed of gift match (Note: The Deed of Gift language for this eventuality is: "In case the parties cannot mutually agree upon the terms of a match, then three races shall be sailed, and the winner of two of such races shall be entitled to the Cup. All such races shall be on ocean courses, free from headlands, as follows: The first race, twenty nautical miles to windward and return; the second race an equilateral triangular race of thirty-nine nautical miles, the first side of which shall be a beat to windward; the third race (if necessary) twenty nautical miles to windward and return; and one week day shall intervene between the conclusion of one race and the starting of the next race. These ocean courses shall be practicable in all parts for vessels of twenty-two feet draught of water, and shall be selected by the Club holding the Cup; and these races shall be sailed subject to its rules and sailing regulations so far as the same do not conflict with the provisions of this deed of gift, but without any times allowances whatever. The challenged Club shall not be required to name its representative vessel until at a time agreed upon for the start, but the vessel when named must compete in all the races, and each of such races must be completed within seven hours.") in gigantic, specialized multi-hull racing yachts with no other clubs or teams participating. The Golden Gate Yacht Club swept the two races as their yacht USA 17 powered by a rigid wing-sail proved to be significantly faster than Société Nautique de Genève's yacht Alinghi 5. The litigation leading up to the match included which club would be the challenger, the dates and venue for the regattas, certain rules governing the regattas (in particular the measurement rules), and the construction of the boats.

The Americans won back the Cup after they last lost it in 1995.

When Société Nautique de Genève (SNG) successfully defended the trophy in the 32nd America's Cup, they immediately accepted a challenge from Club Náutico Español de Vela (CNEV) a Spanish organization formed expressly for the purpose of challenging for the cup and keeping the regatta in Valencia. When SNG and CNEV published their protocol for the 33rd America's Cup challenge, there was widespread consternation over its terms, with some teams and yacht clubs calling it the worst protocol in the history of the event.

The Golden Gate Yacht Club (GGYC) filed its own challenge for the Cup and then filed a court case asking that CNEV be removed as Challenger of Record as being unqualified under the Deed of Gift. GGYC also asked that it be named as the rightful Challenger of Record, being the first club to file a conforming challenge. There followed a long and acrimonious legal battle, with the New York Court of Appeals finally deciding on April 2, 2009, that CNEV did not qualify as valid challenger, and that the GGYC was thus the rightful Challenger of Record.

== Disputes ==
=== Regarding the Challenger of Record ===
Following its successful defense of the Cup on July 3, 2007, Société Nautique de Genève (SNG) accepted a challenge for the 33rd America's Cup from Club Náutico Español de Vela (CNEV), a newly formed yacht club, created for the purpose of challenging for the Cup. CNEV had no boats, no clubhouse, only four members (vice presidents of the Spanish Sailing Federation), and had never run a regatta of any type. On July 5, 2007 SNG and CNEV released the protocols for the next Cup regatta. The protocol was the subject of much criticism, with some teams and yacht clubs calling it the worst protocol in the history of the event.

The Golden Gate Yacht Club (GGYC) initiated legal action against SNG in the New York Supreme Court (the court of first instance) alleging violations of the Deed of Gift of the America's Cup. (New York courts decide disputes regarding the terms of the Deed of Gift because the America's Cup is held under the terms of a charitable legal trust established under New York law). The suit alleged that CNEV did not meet the terms of the Deed of Gift as a legitimate yacht club that would qualify to be the challenger of record, in particular because it had never held an annual regatta, which, according to GGYC, was a requirement under the Deed of Gift. At the same time, GGYC issued a challenge for the Cup.

Because of the precedent set in the 1988 America's Cup where San Diego Yacht Club defended against a monohull yacht with a catamaran, any non mutual-consent challenger must specify the largest multi-hull possible under the terms of the Deed of Gift, if it is to have any chance of winning. Consequently, GGYC specified its yacht as having a 90-ft length-waterline, and 90-ft beam. However, GGYC also stated that they wanted "consensual negotiations in the spirit of the Deed of Gift toward a Protocol comparable in scope, and similar in terms, to that used for the 32nd America's Cup."

As the legal proceedings progressed, SNG continued to work with the other teams on the protocol, and by December 2007 twelve challengers had met the entry deadline and were preparing to race in a multi-challenge 33rd America's Cup. But despite extensive negotiations and proposals made by both sides, GGYC and SNG were unable to agree upon a mutual consent Protocol.

The lawsuit therefore continued and the court ruled in favor of GGYC on November 27, 2007, holding that CNEV was not a valid challenger, and declaring GGYC the proper and legal challenger. SNG was instructed to meet GGYC's challenge under the Deed of Gift terms unless they could agree on other terms by mutual consent. This order was confirmed on March 13, 2008

SNG appealed the decision against CNEV, and on July 29, 2008, the Appellate Division of the New York Supreme Court 2008 reversed the lower court ruling in a 3–2 decision. The lower court had ruled in favor of GGYC because CNEV had not held an annual regatta when it filed its challenge for the Cup. But the Appellate Division ruled that the phrase "having for its annual regatta," as used in the Deed of Gift, is ambiguous. Therefore, CNEV could satisfy the requirement by "intend[ing] to hold an annual regatta and do[ing] so prior to the date of its proposed match."

Pending the outcome of the litigation, SNG had set a deadline of December 15, 2008 for entries in the 33rd America's Cup regatta. On December 8, 2008 GGYC sent a letter to SNG to inform them that GGYC would not submit an entry since it did not consider SNG's regatta "a legitimate America's Cup" and vowed to focus on winning the legal case in the New York Court of Appeals.

A number of organizations submitted amicus curiae briefs to the court. In particular, on December 31, 2008, the New York Yacht Club (NYYC), the oldest and longest holder of the America's Cup, filed a brief supporting GGYC's position.

On April 2, 2009, the New York Court of Appeals in Albany, New York (the court of last instance) decided 6–0 in favor of GGYC, holding that a yacht club could not qualify as challenger unless it had held at least one annual regatta prior to its challenge.

=== Regarding the dates and the venue ===
After the April 2009 ruling GGYC said it would "immediately seek to negotiate with the Defender for a conventional, multi-challenger America's Cup in monohulls." However SNG indicated that they would not negotiate for a multi-challenger regatta and would fall back to a default Deed of Gift match, that is three races over a 40- (first and third race) or 39-nautical mile (second race) course between GGYC's trimaran BMW Oracle Racing 90 and SNG's catamaran Alinghi 5. Indeed, despite various calls for negotiation, it had been apparent for some time that the provisions of the Deed of Gift would likely govern the match, and, further, that the parties did not agree on the interpretation of certain provisions of the Deed of Gift or of the court decision.

In March 2008, the parties had attempted to agree on dates for the races. SNG took the position that it was entitled to a 10-month period to prepare for the race and, because it was based in the Northern Hemisphere, the races could not take place until May 2009. GGYC took the position that the 10-month notice period should run from the November 2007, when the court of first instance ruled that CNEV was not a valid challenger, so the races should take place in October 2008. Despite various attempts, the parties were unable to agree on the dates and on May 12, 2008, the New York Supreme Court issued an order setting the date at 10 months after that date. The 10-month delay was held to have been suspended during the appeals process and was reinstated by the final April 2, 2009 decision of the New York Court of Appeals. However, SNG refused to accept a race in February 2010, arguing again that the deed did not permit racing in the Northern Hemisphere until May. GGYC forced a court session and, on May 14, 2009, the court ruled from the bench that the race must take place in February 2010, unless another date was mutually agreed to.

Though the date was now set, dispute persisted regarding the venue. SNG argued that the April 2, 2009 court decision specifying "that the location of the match shall be in Valencia, Spain or any other location selected by SNG, provided SNG notify GGYC in writing not less than six months in advance of the date set for the first challenge match race of the location it has selected for the challenge match races," allowed it to choose a venue in the Northern Hemisphere. GGYC maintained that without mutual consent, the defender must specify a deed-legal venue, which in February would mean the Southern Hemisphere. Under the terms of the Court order, if SNG did not specify a venue six months before the match, the venue would default to Valencia.

In August 2009 SNG announced that the event would be based in the Northern Hemisphere at Al Hamra Village in the Ras al-Khaimah emirate of the United Arab Emirates.

GGYC immediately replied that Ras al-Khaimah was not a Deed Legal Venue. SNG maintained its position. GGYC filed a motion in court to request "that the Court issue an Order directing that the 33rd America's Cup be held in Valencia, Spain, in February 2010, unless the parties mutually consent otherwise." According to GGYC, Valencia was mentioned in the April 2 court order as an exception, because both parties had indicated that they agreed to Valencia. Unless GGYC agreed to some other location in the Northern Hemisphere, the race must take place in the Southern Hemisphere, because the venue must comply with the Deed of Gift. Indeed, said GGYC, the expression "or any other location" in the April 2 court order could not be interpreted literally, because it could not extend to a venue like the Colorado River or Walden Pond. Given that the literal meaning could not apply, the order must be interpreted consistent with the Deed of Gift.

On October 27, 2009, Justice Shirley Kornreich ruled from the bench that Ras al-Khaimah, United Arab Emirates was not a deed legal venue and that the race must take place either in Valencia or in a Southern Hemisphere venue. In early November, SNG wrote to the court stating that it would hold the race in February in Valencia, Spain., and at the same time, they appealed the decision to the Appellate Division of the New York Supreme Court. The appeal was denied on December 15, 2009.

=== Regarding the rules of the match ===
On July 14, 2009, GGYC filed a motion with the court asking that SNG be found in contempt for changing the rules for the match in secret to allow them to build a boat with powered winches and moveable ballast which were allegedly illegal under the SNG rules that should apply to the race. SNG filed a competing motion asking that GGYC be disqualified as a challenger if they did not produce a Custom House Certificate for their challenging yacht within 14 days, and it disputed the allegations made by GGYC, arguing that the use of powered winches and moveable ballast was common for high performance catamarans racing under SNG's rules, and that the April 2009 version of the SNG rules should apply, since it was only on that date that GGYC was recognized as Challenger of Record.

On July 29, 2009, the court issued its decision regarding these matters. The court refused to hold Alinghi in contempt. The court ruled that the Deed of Gift does not specify any restrictions on the construction of the yachts. Provided that the boats are propelled by sails, auxiliary power can be used for winches etc. Moveable ballast can also be used. Thus Alinghi prevailed on those points. The court also ordered a hearing in order to determine the date on which GGYC could reasonably be compelled to produce the Custom House Certificate for its yacht. On September 2, 2009, GGYC filed an appeal against this decision.

On September 18, 2009, pursuant to its July 29, 2009, decision and following the hearing arising from that decision, the court ruled that the design and construction of the challenger's vessel was not frozen at the time of the challenge. Thus GGYC could continue to modify and to develop its yacht. The Custom House Registry referred to in the Deed of Gift (now called a Certificate of Documentation-COD) had to be delivered two weeks prior to the first race. The Court stated: "It is not only advances in technology, but the unsportsmanlike behavior of Golden Gate that has resulted in substantially reducing SNG's advantage as originally contemplated by the Deed. Nonetheless, Golden Gate's actions are not contrary to law or sanctionable in this limited forum."

On August 6, 2009, SNG sent a letter to GGYC, containing the measurement procedures for the yachts. GGYC did not accept these procedures, in particular because the SNG procedure would include the rudders in the LWL measurement and thus result in GGYC's boat BMW Oracle Racing 90 being disqualified. GGYC requested the court to declare that the measurement procedure proposed by SNG was not valid (in particular the rudders should not be included when measuring length on the load waterline). SNG maintained its position. On October 30, 2009, the court ruled that the rudders should not be included for the measurement of the Load Water Line Length (GGYC's position). SNG appealed that ruling, but the appeal was denied on December 15, 2009.

GGYC also argued that the rules that should apply to the race must be the SNG rules that were in force when GGYC filed its challenge. Otherwise, said GGYC, SNG could arbitrarily change the rules so as to make it impossible for the challenger to win. For example, said GGYC, the modified rules could specify that the challenger would have to race while dragging an anchor. According to GGYC, it did not make sense to envisage that the rules could be changed after the challenge was issued, since the challenger based its challenge on SNG's rules at the time of the challenge. GGYC also challenged certain provisions of the agreement between ISAF and SNG, in particular concerning the powers of the jury.

But on October 30, 2009, Justice Kornreich declined to approve a renew and re-argue of her July 29 decision holding that SNG could change its club rules, but she said that the decision only dealt with Rules 49–54, and that everything else about rules changes was dicta (meaning that it was just discussion—not essential to the decision about Rules 49–54 and can not be used as precedent). Further, the court ordered the nomination of a panel of three independent experts who had sat on an America's Cup jury in the past in order to resolve certain outstanding issues. On the basis of the unanimous opinion of those three experts, on November 19, 2009, judge Kornreich ruled that: (1) all ballast, whether moveable or not, must be included when measuring the Load Water Line; (2) it would be safe to hold the race in Valencia in February, (3) the Notice of Race and other rules could be issued as little as 16 days before the race, but the matter is moot because SNG had already published the Notice of Race; that Notice of Race could be modified by SNG but any modifications could be challenged by GGYC and would be reviewed by the jury; (4) the question of when the panel of jurors is customarily appointed is moot because the jury would soon be named; (5) the arrangements between ISAF and SNG regarding appointment of the jury appeared acceptable.

On December 4, 2009, it was announced that the international jury had been named.

The Notice of Race that was published on November 10, 2009, specified, among other things, that the races would not take place if the wind exceeded 15 knots (28 km/h) or the waves were taller than 1 meter. A draft amended Notice of Race and draft Sailing instructions were published on January 8, 2010. The final versions were published on January 19, 2010. These were immediately challenged by GGYC, who alleged that SNG had inappropriately re-inserted Racing Rule 53 ("Skin Friction"); set the starting time for the races despite the Deed of Gift's requirement that this be agreed by mutual consent; set wind and wave limits to favor its own yacht; changed the latest draft of the Notice of Race to ban certain wind detection equipment now being used by GGYC's yacht and permitted under all earlier drafts of the Notice of Race; inappropriately re-arranged the hierarchy of the applicable rules so that the Notice of Race and Sailing Instructions would, in the case of conflict, overrule the Racing Rules of Sailing. GGYC requested that the International Jury be convened as soon as possible to negate or revise the biased provisions before the races. GGYC subsequently requested that the International Jury also consider certain issues related to the measurement rules. On February 2, 2010, the International Jury rejected GGYC's requests for redress regarding the measurement procedure. The jury held that the maximum amount of moveable ballast had to be on board when the boat was measured and that it had to be equally distributed laterally, but that no other restrictions would apply. On the same date, the Jury decided that SNG, as organizing authority, did have the right to set the start time; that the Race Officer would have the discretion to determine whether weather conditions on any given day were safe and fair so that racing could take place; and that GGYC's wind detection equipment was allowed. It ordered the Notice of Race to be modified to make it clear that the Deed of Gift took precedence and that the Notice of Race and Sailing Instructions could not override the Racing Rules of Sailing.

On January 28, 2010, GGYC announced that it had requested that the International Jury allow it to employ a friction-reduction system that involved discharging liquids in the water. GGYC stated that friction-reduction systems had been explicitly allowed at SNG's request, so it was not appropriate for SNG to attempt to restrict such systems. According to SNG, the discharge of liquids by GGYC's yacht would violate reasonable environmental protection measures incorporated in the Sailing Instructions. On February 2, 2010, the International Jury decided that friction-reduction systems would be allowed provided that applicable environmental laws were not violated.

=== Regarding the construction of the boats ===
On December 22, 2009, GGYC sent a letter to SNG expressing concern about SNG's apparent interpretation of the "constructed in country" provisions of the Deed of Gift. According to GGYC, it appeared that SNG's team intended to use sails constructed in Minden, Nevada, USA, and that this would constitute a direct infringement of the clear terms of the Deed of Gift. GGYC requested that SNG clarify the matter within five days.

The following day, SNG stated publicly that GGYC's accusations were incorrect: "Alinghi 5 complies with the Deed of Gift 'constructed in country' requirement, it was built in Switzerland and so are its sails." On December 28, 2009, SNG sent a letter to GGYC stating that "the Deed only requires the 'yacht or vessel' to be constructed in the respective country and does not expressly impose obligations in respect of any of the separate components on board the yacht or vessel" and further stated that, while they would be willing to meet to discuss any concerns, the issue appeared to be theoretical until SNG declared what yacht it would use to defend the Cup. (Under the provisions of the Deed of Gift, the Defender need not present its boat until the first race.) On December 29, 2009, responding to a letter from GGYC, SNG proposed that a meeting be held in the presence of the Chairman of the International Jury, in order to discuss various concerns, including in particular the interpretation of the "constructed in country" provision of the Deed of Gift. SNG stated that, if GGYC's interpretation were followed, then SNG would have similar concerns regarding a number of items of equipment on board GGYC's yacht. SNG also stated that it was concerned that the rig of GGYC's yacht was not as described in the challenge documents dated July 11, 2007. The proposed meeting took place on 12 and 13 January 2010, but no agreements were reached.

On January 12, 2010, GGYC opened an action in the New York Supreme Court, asking the Court to enter an order declaring that the sails must be constructed in the country where the competing yacht resides and that SNG's apparent use of "3DL" (Note: "3DL" sails are sails that are thermo-molded to have a specific shape, see Sail#Material and.) sails would violate the Deed of Gift. On January 22, 2010, SNG replied to GGYC's allegations. According to SNG, the provisions of the Deed of Gift regarding in-country construction do not apply to sails, and, in any case, the sails of its yacht Alinghi 5 were constructed in Switzerland from parts obtained in the USA. Further, SNG alleged that GGYC's yacht USA itself violated the provisions of the Deed of Gift because it was designed in France and key components were designed and made outside the USA. Also, SNG alleged that USA 17 was not a sloop and therefore was not consistent with the description provided in the challenge. Finally, SNG argued that it would be premature for the court to decide such matters before the regatta for procedural reasons; in particular following the precedent set during the 1988 America's Cup, the matter should be decided after the race, if the loser wished to raise it. On 27 January 2010, GGYC submitted its reply to SNG's allegations. Essentially, GGYC pressed its case and stated that its yacht had been constructed in the US and was sloop-rigged.

On January 29, 2010, Justice Kornreich of the New York Supreme Court informed the parties via telephone conference that she would not hear the complaint regarding the constructed in country requirement before the match scheduled to begin on 8 February.

The America's Cup races then took place in February 2010 but with several legal actions still awaiting decisions from the courts.

On 26 March 2010, BMW Oracle Racing announced that the parties had signed an agreement putting an end to all litigation which included GGYC Breach of Fiduciary Duty claim against SNG as well as all other claims relating to the legality of certain construction details of Alinghi V and USA-17. The agreement also included the transfer of various intellectual property rights such as the americascup.com web site and some physical assets to GGYC in their new role as trustee of the America's Cup.

== Regatta ==
=== Boats ===
BMW Oracle Racing launched a 90-foot (27 m) trimaran in August 2008 in Anacortes, Washington. After three weeks of shakedown cruises, the boat was shipped to San Diego, California where it underwent development for the next fourteen months. Initially known as BMW Oracle Racing 90 (BOR90), the yacht was renamed USA 17 upon launch in Valencia conforming with the notice of challenge. The boat was extensively modified during the time in San Diego, most notably in replacing the outer floats, adding powered hydraulics, and fitting a rigid wing sail. At the end of December 2009, the boat was shipped to Valencia, where it arrived on January 4, 2010. After its win in the first race, most observers stated that the rigid wing sail had provided USA with a decisive advantage.

Alinghi built a catamaran at a boatyard in Villeneuve, Switzerland, called Alinghi 5 which was 90-foot (27 m) on the waterline with a bowsprit that makes it "about 120-foot (37 m) overall." Somewhat controversially, A5 introduced an engine to power hydraulics. It was launched on July 8, 2009, being lifted from the construction shed in Villeneuve by a Mil Mi-26 helicopter and carried thereby to Lake Geneva. On August 7, 2009, the same type of helicopter transported the boat from Lake Geneva to Genoa, Italy. At the end of September 2009, the boat was shipped to Ras al Khaimah. At the end of December 2009, the boat was shipped to Valencia, where it arrived on January 5, 2010.

=== Races ===
Racing was scheduled to start on February 8, 2010, but unsteady wind conditions caused the first start attempt to be postponed, and the second attempt on February 10, 2010, was aborted due to rough sea conditions.

Date	Course	Winner	Loser	Winning Time	Delta	Score	Winner's Velocity on Course	Notes
February 12, 2010	40 miles, windward leeward	USA-17	Alinghi 5	2:32:38 (Note: Leg one duration was 1:29:39; leg two: 53:59)	15:28	1–0	15.7	Winds 5–10 knots
February 14, 2010	39 miles, triangular	USA-17	Alinghi 5	2:06:49 (Note: Leg one duration was 58:54; leg two: 29:35; leg three: 38:20)	5:26	2–0	18.5	Winds 7–8 knots

Race 1 leader deltas
Yacht	Start	Mark 1	Finish
USA-17		3:21	15:28
Alinghi 5	1:27		

Race 2 leader deltas
Yacht	Start	Mark 1	Mark 2	Finish
USA-17	0:24	0:28	2:44	5:26
Alinghi 5				

Race 1 narrative: An aggressive pre-start by BMW Oracle Racing forced a foul by Alinghi, which had not taken advantage of the diagonal start line allowed for the port-entry boat. Both boats wound up head to the wind over the start line. Alinghi bore off while BMW Oracle Racing remained stalled and started c.650 m behind (1:27). BMW Oracle Racing were clearly able to sail higher and faster (average speed 20.2 kt vs. 19.4 kt), so they caught up with Alinghi within 15 minutes and thereafter extended their lead eventually winning by over 3,000 m. Upwind they were able to out-sail Alinghi even without a jib and their speed differential was greater downwind (23.5 kt vs. 20.7 kt average speed) than upwind. The final delta includes a penalty turn by Alinghi due to not keeping clear at the start. Without the penalty turn the delta was about 8½ minutes. Winds were 5 to 10 knots. Partial timings for the winner were 1h29 upwind, 1h03 downwind.

Race 2 narrative: Alinghi received a penalty for being in the pre-start area before the designated time. There was very little pre-start maneuvering. BMW Oracle Racing started on starboard tack ahead of Alinghi on port tack. Alinghi sailed faster than during the previous race and benefited from a 20-degree wind shift, which put the Swiss boat in the lead at about the midpoint of the first leg. But after crossing ahead, Alinghi fell behind after tacking for the lay line. BMW Oracle Racing then proved to be much faster on the first reach, pulling about 2 kilometers ahead (26.8 kt vs. 25.2 kt average speed). The final delta includes the penalty turn by Alinghi. Without the penalty turn the delta would have been around 4 minutes. Winds were 7 to 8 knots. Partial timings for the winner were 0h59 to upwind mark, 0h29 to gybe mark, 0h39 to finish.

=== Crews ===
==== Alinghi V (Team Alinghi) - Defender ====
Role	Name	Races	Comments
Bowman	(Netherlands) Piet van Nieuwenhuijzen	1,2	
Midbow	(Canada) Curtis Blewett	1,2	
Pitman	(New Zealand) Rodney Ardern	1,2	
Trimmer upwind	(New Zealand) Simon Daubney	1,2	
Trimmer downwind	(Switzerland) Nils Frei	1,2	
Mainsail trimmer	(New Zealand) Warwick Fleury	1,2	
Traveller	(Switzerland) Pierre-Yves Jorand	1,2	
Helmsman	(Switzerland) Ernesto Bertarelli	1,2	
Tactician	(New Zealand) Brad Butterworth	1,2	
Runner	(New Zealand) Murray Jones	1,2	Race 1: Runner, Race 2: Strategist
Navigator	(Spain) Juan Vila	1,2	
Floater	(South Africa) (France) Jan Dekker	1,2	Race 1: Floater, Race 2: Bow 3
Floater	(France) Loïck Peyron	1,2	Race 2: Alternate Helmsman
Pre-start	(New Zealand) Peter Evans	1,2	

==== USA 17 (BMW Oracle Racing) - Challenger ====
Role	Name	Races
Bowman	(New Zealand) Brad Webb	1,2
Pitman	(Italy) Simone de Mari	1,2
Jib Trimmer	(New Zealand) Ross Halcrow	1,2
Wing Sail Trimmer	(Netherlands) Dirk de Ridder	1,2
Wing Sail Caddy	(Australia) Joe Newton	1,2
Tactician	(United States) John Kostecki	1,2
Skipper/Helmsman	(Australia) James Spithill	1,2
Navigator	(Italy) Matteo Plazzi	1,2
Aft Pit	(France) Thierry Fouchier	1,2
Mast	(New Zealand) Matthew Mason	1,2
Afterguard	(United States) Larry Ellison	2

== Aftermath ==
=== Start of Race 2 ===
After the conclusion of the second race, Principal Race Officer (PRO) Harold Bennett commented that he had encountered problems in starting Race 2.

The original Race Instructions issued by the SNG Race Committee (RC) defined the maximum allowed wave height, maximum wind velocity and maximum variation of wind direction across the course in order for a race to be started and completed. It is unusual for specific weather conditions to be inserted in the race instructions because this is usually left to the discretion of the PRO to start a race in conditions which are deemed to be safe and/or allow the race to be completed within the time limit. The consensus of most of the commentators at the time was that the wind conditions defined in the race instructions were artificially low and designed to favour Alinghi 5 which was generally thought to have a better performance than USA 17 in light airs. GGYC appealed these specific limits to the ISAF International Jury who ordered them removed from the Notice of Race, but noted "that the RC has the obligation to comply with appropriate safety and legal obligations when making a decision to start or continue a race."

The competitors had been waiting on the water for close to four hours. As the 16:30 deadline for starting a race approached, Bennett ordered the postponement to be taken down indicating that a race starting sequence would soon commence. The SNG Race Committee refused to follow this direction, and left the bridge, moving below decks. In order to continue Bennett had to ask Tom Ehman, the BOR representative on board the committee boat plus a support boat driver to assist with the raising and lowering of flags to complete the start sequence. "I have never seen such disgraceful behavior on a committee boat, trying to influence the PRO to the point of ordering me to stop the [start] sequence", wrote Bennett.

=== Termination of Legal Action ===
As detailed above, on 26 March 2010 BMW Oracle Racing announced that agreement had been reached between GGYC and SNG to drop all remaining litigation hence eliminating the prospect of post-race legal disputes.

=== Louis Vuitton Trophy ===
Because of the long delays from the legal action, and the fact that the 33rd America's Cup was a Deed of Gift match without a defender or challenger selection series, the Louis Vuitton Pacific Series was established and raced in January and February 2009 as a competition for other America's Cup racing syndicates. Ten syndicates took part in the regatta which used boats provided by Team New Zealand and BMW Oracle Racing.

This initial event was then expanded into the Louis Vuitton Trophy series of events which started in November 2009. These events were designed to be low cost and keep syndicates active while waiting for the 34th America's Cup.

=== 34th America's Cup ===
After the conclusion of the second race Club Nautico di Roma represented by the sailing team Mascalzone Latino, a longtime supporter of BMW Oracle, was named the challenger of record. BMW Oracle Racing promised a multi-challenger regatta.

== See also ==
- The Wind Gods, 2013 documentary film based on the 33rd America's Cup 2010.
- America's Cup
- Deed of Gift of the America's Cup
- Louis Vuitton Trophy
