= Deed of Gift of the America's Cup =

Document governing the rules for the America's Cup

- Created: July 8, 1857 (original); February 2, 1882 (revised); October 24, 1887 (revised); December 17, 1956 (amended); April 5, 1985 (amended)
- Location: Albany, New York
- Author: George L. Schuyler (originally with others)
- Purpose: Promote friendly competition among nations

The Deed of Gift of the America's Cup is the primary document that governs the rules to make a valid challenge for the America's Cup and the rules of conduct of the races. The current version of the deed of gift is the third revision of the original deed. The original deed was written in 1852 and forwarded to the New York Yacht Club on July 8, 1857.

== History ==
The surviving members of the syndicate which owned the yacht America, the first winner of what would become the America's Cup (originally the "Royal Yacht Squadron Cup" or the "RYS Cup for One Hundred Sovereigns"), donated the America's Cup through a deed of gift to the New York Yacht Club on July 8, 1857. The cup would be held in trust as a "challenge trophy" to promote friendly competition among nations, with the deed of gift being the primary instrument governing the rules to make a valid challenge for the cup and the rules of conduct of the races.

After the 1881 Cup match, the New York Yacht Club officially returned the Cup to George L. Schuyler, the sole surviving member of the syndicate that owned America to rewrite the deed to discourage Canadian yacht clubs based on the Great Lakes from challenging for the Cup. This revised Deed incorporated, among other things, the following rules: the challenger's yacht club's annual regatta must take place on the sea or on an arm of the sea, and the challenging boat must sail to the site of the contest on her own bottom, as the yacht America did when first winning the cup in England.

In 1887, the challenging yacht's hull was much longer than originally stated by the challenger, a potential advantage. The difference alarmed the N.Y.Y.C., but they rectified the situation by handicapping the challenger. Although the N.Y.Y.C. successfully defended the Cup that year, the problem spurred them to rewrite the Deed. Once again the club officially returned the Cup to Schuyler. The third Deed is much longer and couched in legal terminology. The third Deed tightened the rules for challenging; for example, it stated explicitly that the challenger must not exceed the dimensions provided to the holder of the Cup. The new version of the rules created an uproar among many British yachtsmen, who claimed that the new rules made it impossible to challenge as sailboats with a longer length have a higher speed than boats with a shorter length. No one challenged until six years later, when British railroad tycoon James Lloyd Ashbury set forth his first of two challenges.

After the Second World War, the N.Y.Y.C. amended the Deed by changing the requirement regarding waterline length: the minimum waterline length was reduced from 65 feet (20 m) to 44 feet (13 m) to allow the use of the 12-metre class. In addition, the rule that the challenging boat had to sail on her own bottom to the site of the match was eliminated, permitting boats to be shipped to the venue without requiring them to be able to sail across oceans (or contain living accommodations).

In 1985 a second amendment was made to allow for matches to take place during the summer in the Southern Hemisphere.

== Interpretation ==
The Deed of Gift is a registered Trust document in the New York Supreme Court in Manhattan (New York County), New York City, New York, which is a court of first instance, unlike supreme courts of other jurisdictions. An interpretation of the document, when contested, can be taken before that Court for clarification on whether the Deed of Gift's terms and conditions (as written by George L. Schuyler) are being met.

The wording of the deed is comparatively straightforward but written in the legal language, style and terminology of the time it was written. In later years this has given rise to disputes relating to the meaning of particular phrases and words and clarified or further confused by taking a view on what the donor actually intended when the deed was written.

There have been two instances of litigation regarding interpretation appealed to the New York Court of Appeals, that state's highest court. The first concerned the challenge for the 1988 America's Cup, where the question was first, whether the Mercury Bay Boating Club was a valid challenger and if San Diego Yacht Club had to accept their challenge; and second, whether the Defender's boat (a catamaran) complied with the terms of the Deed of Gift. The answer was yes to both questions.

The second concerned Société Nautique de Genève, the defender of the 2010 America's Cup, where the question was whether a valid challenge could be accepted by the defender from a 'shell' yacht club that was formed for the specific purpose of challenging and had not previously held a properly constituted annual regatta on an ocean water course or an arm of the sea. The court's answer was no. There were subsequently a number of additional issues raised regarding the type of boat to be used, the venue and other points which were put to the court by the court adjudicated valid challenger Golden Gate Yacht Club. All were upheld by the court with the exception of two issues which were open and still awaiting court decisions even after the completion of the 2010 America's Cup races but both sides agreed to drop all outstanding legal actions soon after.
