= Société Nautique de Genève =

Swiss yacht club

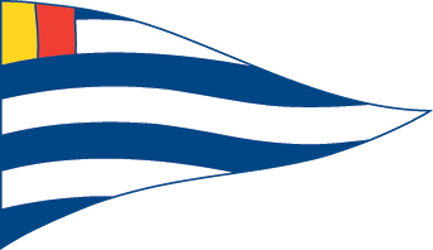
Société Nautique de Genève

The Société Nautique de Genève is a yacht club based in Geneva, Switzerland. It was founded in 1872 with the goal of developing nautical sports and high level sailors. The club currently has about 3,000 members.

The club held the America's Cup from 2003 until 2010, staging one successful defense in 2007 with its Alinghi syndicate.

The club is active in yacht racing and high-performance catamarans have been developed specifically for the lake. The design of Alinghi 5, the defender of the 2010 America's Cup, was influenced by those racing catamarans. The best-known event, the "Bol d'or" (not to be confused with other events having the same name) runs from Geneva to the end of the lake and back.

== 2010 America's Cup ==
America's Cup Management announced on 5 July 2007 that the protocol for the 2010 America's Cup had been agreed between the defending yacht club, the Société Nautique de Genève of Switzerland and Challenger of Record, Club Náutico Español de Vela of Spain. However this arrangement did not survive a legal challenge from BMW Oracle Racing, who successfully argued that Club Náutico Español de Vela was not a valid Challenger of Record due to non-compliance with the terms of the America's Cup Deed of Gift.

After extensive court action, Golden Gate Yacht Club (sailing team BMW Oracle Racing) was declared Challenger of Record and sailed against Société Nautique de Genève (sailing team Alinghi), in the 2010 America's Cup during February 2010, in Valencia, Spain. The competing boats, Alinghi 5 and USA 17 were both 90-foot multihulls. USA 17's rigid wing sail provided a decisive advantage and USA 17 easily won the first two races in a best of three race contest to win 2010 America's Cup on behalf of the Golden Gate Yacht Club.

== See also ==
The other America's Cup title holders:

- New York Yacht Club, defeating the competition's founders, the Royal Yacht Squadron, 1851-1983
- Royal Perth Yacht Club, 1983-1987
- San Diego Yacht Club, 1987-1995
- Royal New Zealand Yacht Squadron; 1995-2003, 2017-present
- Golden Gate Yacht Club, 2010-2017
