= Golden Gate Yacht Club =

U.S. yacht club

Coordinates: 37°48′27.79″N 122°26′33.37″W

- Burgee
- Short name: GGYC
- Founded: 1939
- Location: 1 Yacht Road, San Francisco, California 94123
- Commodore: Jim Flaherty
- Website: www.ggyc.com

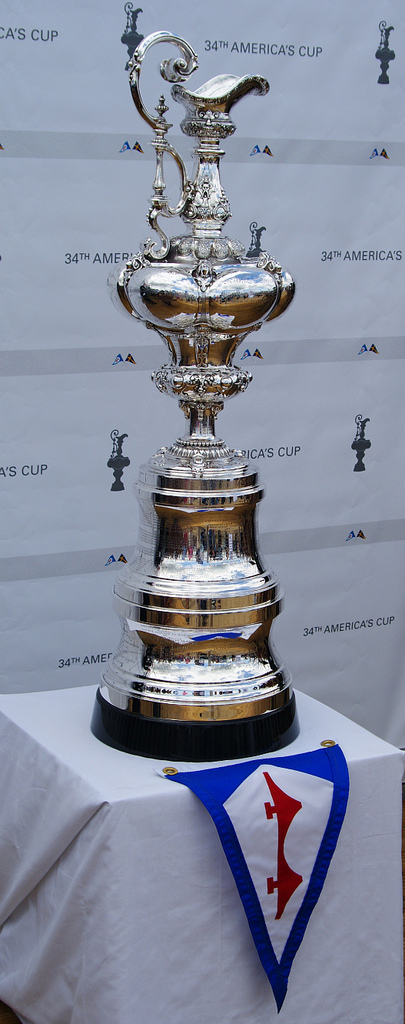
The America's Cup at the GGYC.

The Golden Gate Yacht Club (GGYC) is a yacht club based in San Francisco, California, United States. Founded in 1939, the GGYC is the home port of Oracle Team USA, the winners of the 2010 and 2013 America's Cup yacht racing competition

== History ==
In 1939 the first members built a clubhouse on a barge in the San Francisco Marina. After the 1989 Loma Prieta earthquake severely damaged the club, members pulled together and rebuilt it.

GGYC is a popular cruise and regatta venue on the San Francisco waterfront. The club is located on the jetty directly east of the St. Francis Yacht Club and north of the Marina Green, at the end of Yacht Road. The most well-known of current members is Oracle Corporation founder Larry Ellison.

The Club entered the 2007 Louis Vuitton Cup, the America's Cup challenger selection series, represented by the BMW Oracle Racing team. BMW Oracle Racing were eliminated in the semi-finals. The team challenged for the America's Cup in 2010 and won a Deed of Gift match 2–0 against the Société Nautique de Genève's (SNG) Alinghi team, making GGYC the first American yacht club to hold the cup since 1995.

America's Cup Management announced on July 5, 2007 that the protocol for the 33rd America's Cup had been agreed between the Defending yacht club, SNG, and its Challenger of Record, the Club Náutico Español de Vela of Spain. GGYC sued, successfully arguing that Club Náutico Español de Vela was not a valid challenger. The challenge was upheld, and BMW Oracle Racing sailed against Alinghi in February 2010 in Valencia, Spain. The competing boats, Alinghi 5 and USA 17 were both 90-foot multihulls. The rigid wing sail of USA 17 provided a decisive advantage and GGYC won the 2010 America's Cup by a considerable margin.

GGYC successfully defended their title at the 34th America's Cup in San Francisco in 2013, but finally lost the trophy in the 35th edition against the Royal New Zealand Yacht Squadron.

== Commodores ==
To date, there have been 66 commodores of the Golden Gate Yacht Club.

Name	Years served
Jim Flaherty	2025 – present
Maurice Quillen	2022 – 2024
Leslie Lacopi	2019 - 2022
Norbert Bajurin	2010 - 2018
Marcus Young	2007 - 2010
David Haskin	2005 - 2006
Ned Barrett	2003 - 2004
Norbert Bajurin	2001 - 2002
Linda Pierce	2000
Mary Sancimino	1999
Nancy Wesley	1998
Joseph Bambara	1997
Michael McGlothlin	1996
Michael Hobson	1995
Jim Brennan	1994
Chuck Pierce	1993
Karen McManus	1991 - 1992
Douglas Carroll	1990
Hans Randrup	1989
Oral Moore	1988
Cal Person	1987
Dana Pettengill	1986
Gordon Engel	1985
Bud Fuller	1984
Dave Miller	1983
Jeff Litke	1982
Dean Collins	1981
John Kenny	1980
Mike Mann	1979
Ralph Lewis	1978
Roy Koski, D.M.D.	1977
Louis Rossi	1976
John Roveda	1975
William Dodge	1974
Ed Nylund	1973
Roy C. Berner	1972
Anthony G.Vlantis	1971
Wes Smith	1970
Bruce Paulk	1969
Wally Solloway	1968
Cliff Melder	1967
Douglas C. Carroll	1966
Richard Carroll	1965
Walter Vendetti	1964
James Heatlie	1963
Harry Lieberman	1962
John Benone	1961
Kenneth Carlson	1960
Leo Cone	1959
Dan Regan	1958
Ray Carpenter	1957
Bob Kelly	1956
Otto Bueren	1955
Max Koch	1954
Len Fleischman	1953
Max Williams	1952
Manuel Fagundes	1951
Jeff Capell	1950
Paul Dember	1948 - 1949
W. Muggenthaler	1947
W.H. Capell	1946
J. Arvid Johnson	1945
Robert A. Davies	1944
H. McMullen	1943
H.A. Livingston	1942
Bud Schaffnit	1941
H.P McKean	1940

== See also ==
America's Cup title holders

- New York Yacht Club, defeating the competition's founders, the Royal Yacht Squadron, 1851-1983
- Royal Perth Yacht Club, 1983-1987
- San Diego Yacht Club, 1987-1995
- Société Nautique de Genève, 2003-2010
- Royal New Zealand Yacht Squadron; 1995-2003, 2017-present
