= USA 17 =

Racing trimaran

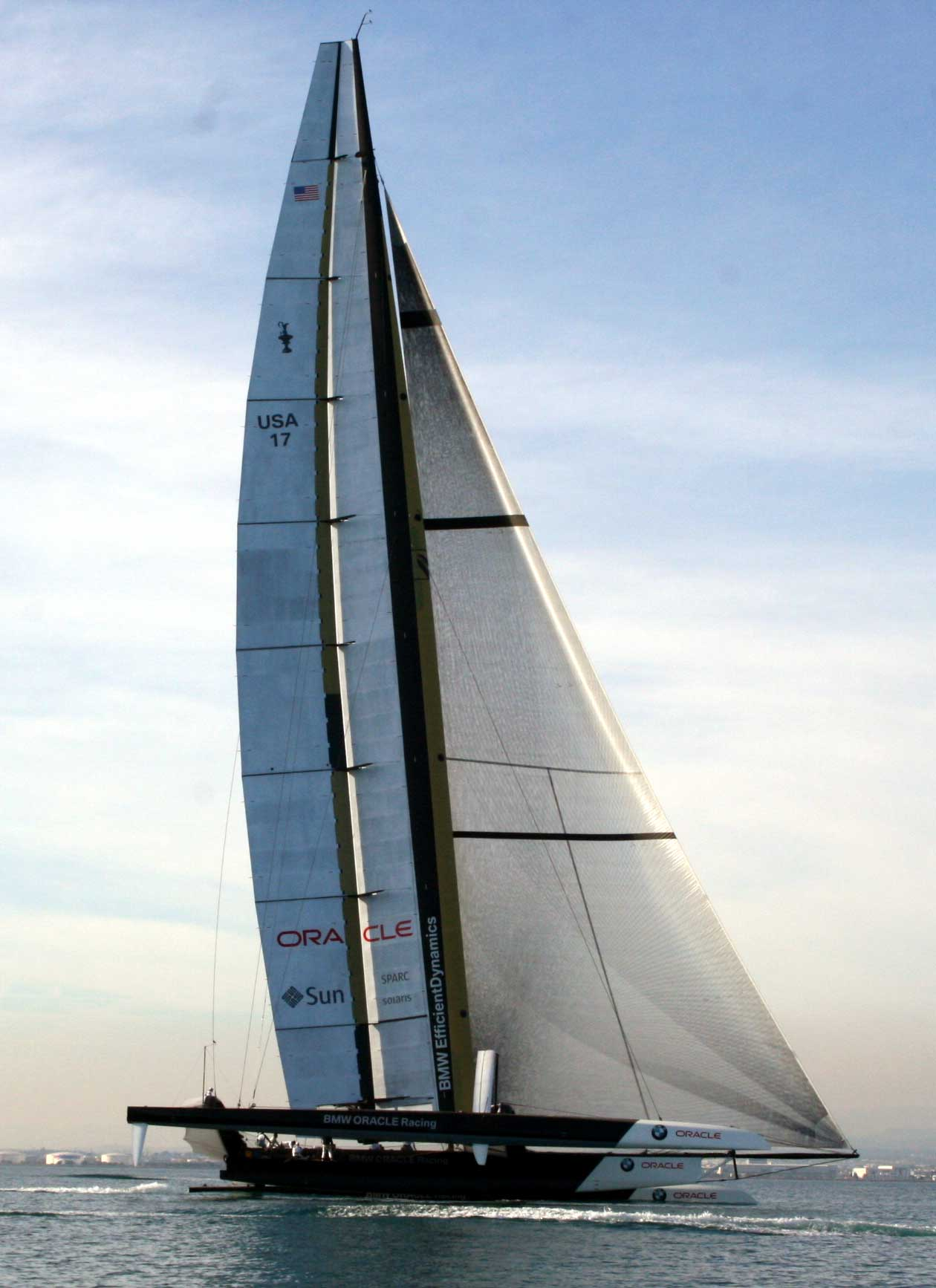
- BMW Oracle racing USA-17 training off Valencia, Spain in late January, 2010
- Yacht club: Golden Gate Yacht Club
- Nation: United States
- Sail no: USA–17
- Designer(s): VPLP
- Builder: Core Builders; Anacortes, WA, USA
- Owner(s): Oracle Team USA

Racing career
- Skippers: James Spithill
- Notable victories: 2010 America's Cup
- America's Cup: 2010

Specifications
- Type: Trimaran
- Displacement: 17 tons
- Length: 113 ft (34 m) (LOA); 90 ft (27 m) (LWL)
- Beam: 89.9 ft (27.4 m)
- Mast height: 180 ft (55 m)
- Sail area: 13,700 sq ft (1,270 m^{2})

USA-17 (Note: The name shown on official documentation is USA, but the boat's name is USA 17.) (formerly known as BMW Oracle Racing 90 or BOR90) is a sloop rigged racing trimaran built by the American sailing team BMW Oracle Racing to challenge for the 2010 America's Cup. Designed by VPLP Yacht Design with consultation from Franck Cammas and his Groupama multi-hull sailing team, BOR90 is very light for her size being constructed almost entirely out of carbon fiber and epoxy resin, and exhibits very high performance being able to sail at 2.0 to 2.5 times the true wind speed. From the actual performance of the boat during the 2010 America's Cup races, it can be seen that she could achieve a velocity made good upwind of over twice the wind speed and downwind of over 2.5 times the wind speed. She can apparently sail at 20 degrees off the apparent wind. The boat sails so fast downwind that the apparent wind she generates is only 5-6 degrees different from that when she is racing upwind; that is, the boat is always sailing upwind with respect to the apparent wind.

== Design ==
USA 17 was designed by VPLP.

== Career ==
=== Launching and initial testing ===
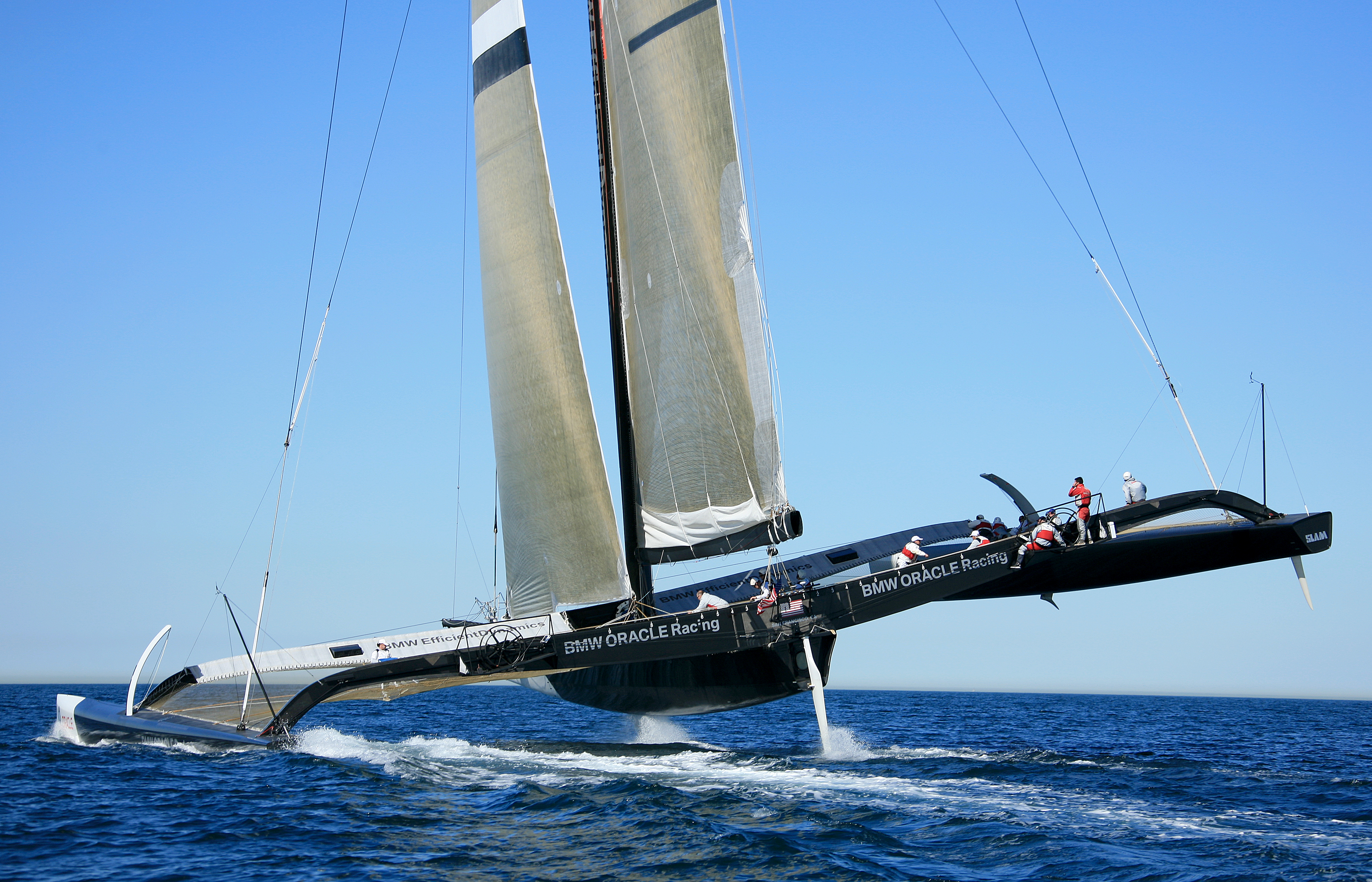
BMW Oracle Racing's BOR 90 in original configuration, sailing in the Pacific Ocean near San Diego

BOR 90 was launched in Anacortes, Washington in August 2008 after more than 9 months of construction. She underwent initial testing in Anacortes before being shipped to San Diego, California for additional sea trials and development.

In March 2009, USA 17 (then referred to as BOR90) was pulled from the water for extensive modification in BMW Oracle Racing's San Diego shop. She emerged in early July, 2009, featuring wave-piercing hulls and other modifications. She was further modified subsequently, in particular in October 2009 to add an engine to power hydraulic winches.

On November 8, 2009, the team announced that a rigid sail wing had been built for the yacht. (Note: Stars and Stripes, a catamaran with this type of rigid sail (a wing) won the 1988 America's Cup.) The wingsail was initially 190 feet (58 m) tall and some 80 percent larger than the wing of a Boeing 747 airplane; it was later extended to 223 feet (68 m). The wing has a very high aspect ratio, meaning that it is very tall and narrow. It can change camber to adjust lift in order to optimize performance. The wing consists of two main elements, separated by a vertical slot through which air can flow. The rear element is made up of several separate sections, whose angle can be adjusted separately, much like the flaps on an airplane's wing. Thus the lift of the sail can be controlled very finely, both overall, and for each section.

The wing is more efficient than a traditional soft-sail rig setup. On November 10, BMW reported that they hit 32 miles per hour (28 kn) boat speed in a 10-knot (19 km/h; 12 mph) reported wind speed. During the first race of the 2010 America's Cup, USA 17 was able to sail upwind faster than Alinghi 5 even without a jib. Since the sail area of USA 17's wing is much larger than the sail area of Alinghi 5's mainsail and jib combined, it is clear that the rigid wing is much more efficient than even high-performance traditional sails.

=== America's Cup ===
==== Race 1 ====
The first race of the 2010 America's Cup took place on February 12, 2010. USA 17 beat the defender, Alinghi 5. USA 17 started behind by 1:27 after start box maneuvering with Alinghi, but was ahead by 3:21 at the windward mark and by about 9 minutes at the finish. Her official finish time was 15:28 ahead of the loser because Alinghi 5 had to perform a penalty turn, having failed to stay clear at the start.

Wind speeds were 5–10 knots (9.3–18.5 km/h; 5.8–11.5 mph) during the first race. USA 17 reached the windward mark in 1h29, so her velocity made good was about 13.5 knots (25.0 km/h; 15.5 mph), or about 1.8 times wind speed. USA 17 took 63 minutes to reach the downwind mark, so her velocity made good downwind was about 19 knots (35 km/h; 22 mph), or about 2.5 times wind speed. (Note: See minutes 30 and 59 of podcast interview with USA 17 designer Mike Drummond.)

The measured wind velocity is taken at near sea level, and does not account for effects of wind gradient with reported true wind speed of 15 knots (28 km/h; 17 mph) at mast head height of over 60 metres (200 ft). The measured sea-level wind direction shifted away from 180 degrees between the time of setting of the course and commencement of sailing of the downwind leg, by which time wind direction was reported to be at around 160 degrees. As such the ratio between downwind velocity made good and wind speed is an approximation only.

==== Race 2 ====
On February 14, 2010, USA 17 also won the second race, and thus the America's Cup, again by a considerable margin. USA 17 was ahead by 0:24 at the start, by 0:28 at the windward mark, by 2:44 at the gybe mark, and by over 4 minutes at the finish. Her official finish time was 5:26 ahead of the defender because Alinghi 5 had to perform a penalty turn, having entered the pre-start area too soon.

Wind speeds were 7 to 8 knots (13 to 15 km/h; 8.1 to 9.2 mph) during the second race. USA 17 reached the windward mark in 59 minutes, so her velocity made good was about 13.2 knots (24.4 km/h; 15.2 mph), or about 1.65 times wind speed. The course was a triangle, so the velocity made good downwind was only 11.5 knots (21.3 km/h; 13.2 mph), or about 1.4 times wind speed. USA 17 averaged 26.8 knots (49.6 km/h; 30.8 mph), or about 3.6 times the wind speed, on the faster first triangular leg.

Observers stated that the rigid wing had given USA a decisive advantage.

== See also ==
- List of large sailing yachts
