= Alinghi 5 =

Catamaran watercraft in Switzerland

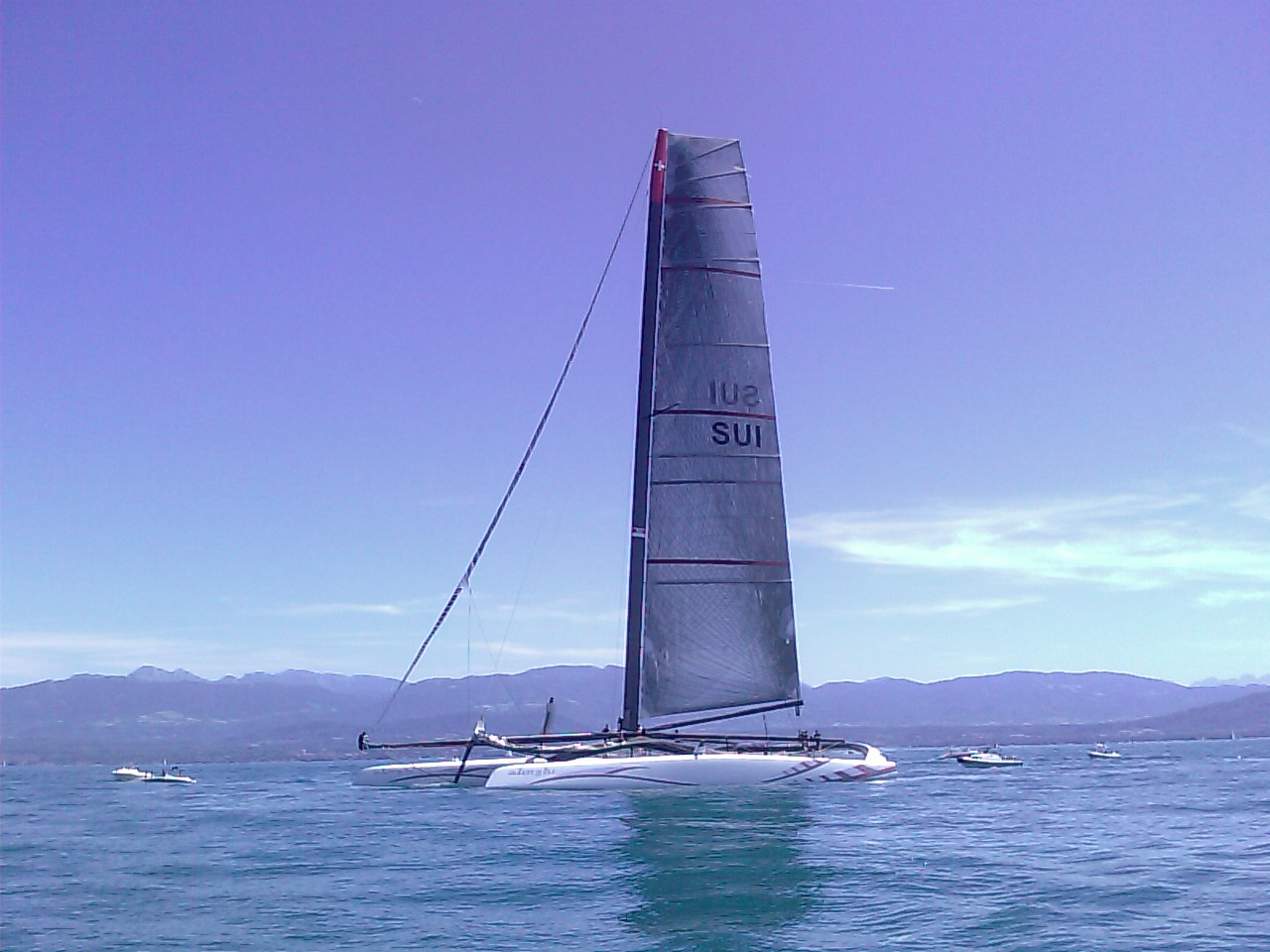
- Alinghi 5, July 2009
- Yacht club: Société Nautique de Genève
- Nation: Switzerland
- Class: 90ft LWL Deed of Gift vessel
- Designer(s): Rolf Vrolijk and Alinghi design team
- Builder: Alinghi-Décision
- Launched: 8 July 2009
- Owner(s): Alinghi

Racing career
- America's Cup: 2010

Specifications
- Type: Catamaran
- Displacement: ~11 tons (without mast)
- Length: 110 ft (34 m) (LOA), 90 ft (27 m) (LWL); 110 ft (34 m) (WL sailing)
- Beam: 90 ft (27 m)
- Sail area: Mainsail: ~6,000 sq ft (560 m^{2}); Headsail: ~4,000 sq ft (370 m^{2}); Gennaker: ~11,800 sq ft (1,100 m^{2})

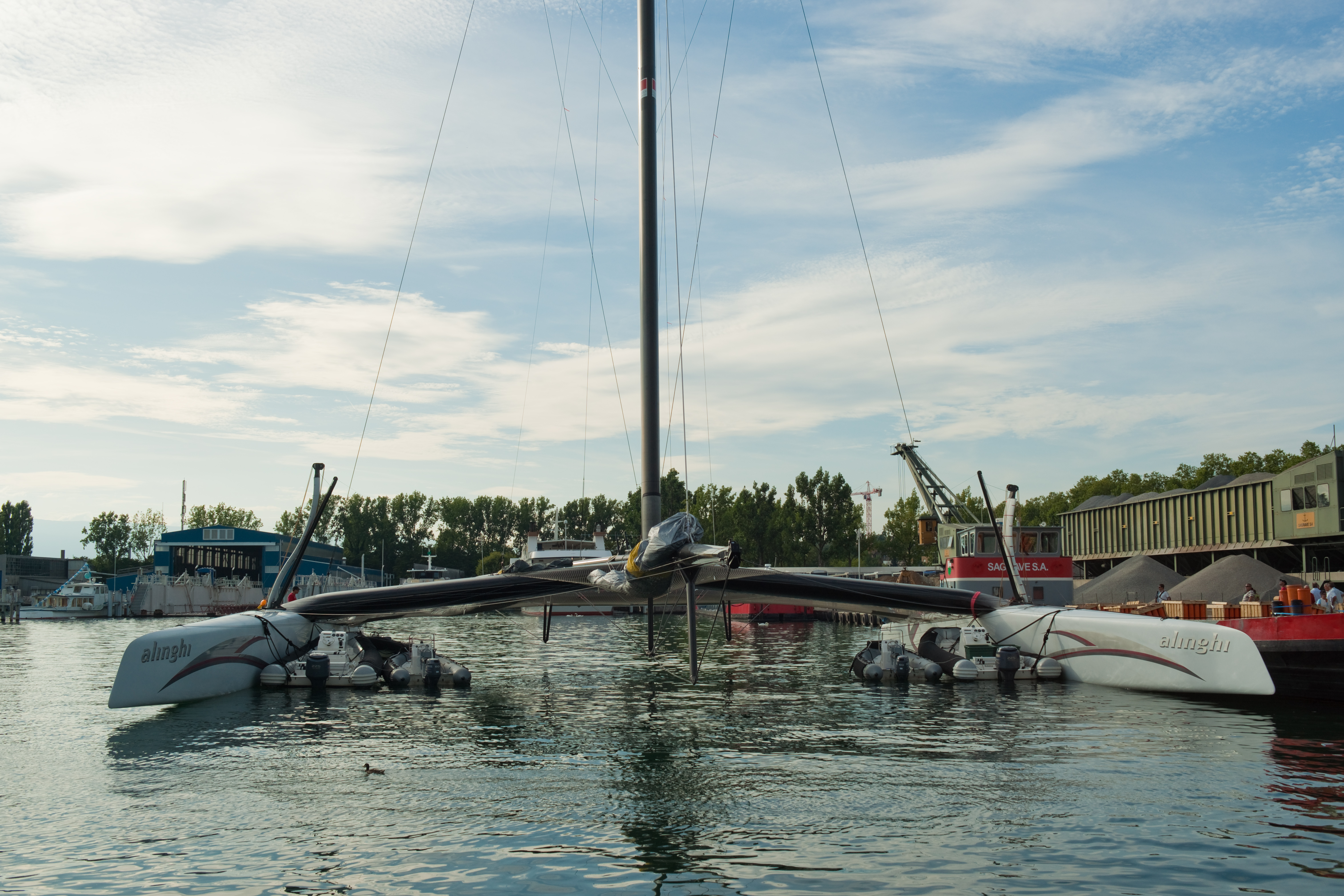
Alinghi V in Lausanne harbour, Switzerland, July 2009

Alinghi 5 is a 90 ft (27 m) (LWL), 90 ft (27 m) beam sloop-rigged catamaran built by Alinghi for the 33rd America's Cup.

The boat was launched on 8 July 2009 when the hull was lifted from the construction shed in Villeneuve, Vaud by a Mil Mi-26 helicopter and carried to Lake Geneva. Alinghi 5 was subsequently moved again by helicopter to Genoa, Italy. At the end of September 2009, the boat was shipped to Ras al Khaimah, the venue selected by the defender for the 33rd America's Cup. At the end of October 2009, the New York Supreme Court (the court of first instance) ruled that the venue of Ras al Khaimah was not compliant with the Deed of Gift. After various discussions, Société Nautique de Genève (SNG—the Defending club) agreed that the venue would be Valencia, Spain. An appeal by SNG regarding the venue was rejected and Alinghi 5 was shipped at the end of December 2009 from Ras al Khaimah to Valencia, where she arrived on 5 January 2010.

== Characteristics ==
Designed by Rolf Vrolijk and an Alinghi design team headed by Grant Simmer, Alinghi 5 was built in Villeneuve, Switzerland, by Alinghi-Décision and required more than 100,000 hours of work.

The mast is approximately 62 metres (203 ft) tall the original shorter mast was replaced by a taller one in October 2009). An engine installed at the back of the boat provides power for the winches.

When sailing upwind, the boat can sail at less than 20 degrees off the apparent wind. During a training run, Alinghi 5 covered 20 nautical miles (37 km) to windward and back in 2.5 hours in 8–9-knot (15–17 km/h; 9.2–10.4 mph) winds, so her average velocity made good was 16 knots (30 km/h), about 1.9 times the wind speed. Alinghi 5 sails so fast downwind that the apparent wind she generates is only 5–6 degrees different from when she is racing upwind; that is, Alinghi 5 is always sailing upwind with respect to the apparent wind. An explanation of this phenomenon can be found in the article on sailing faster than the wind.

The design of the yacht was influenced by that of racing catamarans developed for regattas on Lake Geneva.

As of 2018 Alinghi 5 was being stored at Marina Sur in Valencia, Spain.

== Racing results ==
The first race of the 2010 America's Cup took place on 12 February 2010. Alinghi 5 lost the race to the challenger, USA 17. Alinghi 5 was ahead by 1:27 at the start, but was behind by 3:21 at the windward mark and by about 10 minutes at the finish. Her official finish time was 15:28 behind the winner because Alinghi 5 had to perform a penalty turn, having failed to stay clear at the start.

Winds were 5–10 knots (9.3–18.5 km/h; 5.8–11.5 mph). Alinghi 5 reached the windward mark in 1h32, so her velocity made good was about 13 knots (24 km/h; 15 mph), or about 1.7 times wind speed. Alinghi 5 took 69 1/2 minutes to reach the downwind mark, so her velocity made good downwind was about 17 knots (31 km/h; 20 mph), or about 2.3 times wind speed.

On 14 February 2010, Alinghi 5 also lost the second race, and thus the America's Cup, again by a considerable margin, even though she appeared to sail better upwind than on the first day, thanks to a fuller mainsail combined with a smaller jib. Alinghi 5 was behind by 0:24 at the start, by 0:28 at the windward mark, by 2:44 at the gybe mark, and by over 2 minutes at the finish. Her official finish time was 5:26 behind the winner because Alinghi 5 had to perform a penalty turn, having entered the pre-start area too soon.

Winds were 7 to 8 knots (13 to 15 km/h; 8.1 to 9.2 mph). Alinghi 5 reached the windward mark in 59 minutes, so her velocity made good was about 13.2 knots (24.4 km/h; 15.2 mph), or about 1.8 times wind speed. The course was a triangle, so the velocity made good downwind was only 11.1 knots (20.6 km/h; 12.8 mph), or about 1.5 times wind speed. Alinghi 5 averaged 25.2 knots (46.7 km/h; 29.0 mph), or about 3.4 times the wind speed, on the faster first triangular leg.

Most observers stated that USA 17's rigid wing sail had given her a decisive advantage.

She could be seen on Google Maps while trialing on Lake Geneva, but disappeared with the imagery update of 2011 (she can be still be found using the Historical Imagery tool of Google Earth). Using the Measurement tool in Google Maps renders her 110 feet LOA and 75 feet beam.
