= Statistics of SailGP =

Statistics for a sailing competition

This article gives the summarized standings of each season of SailGP, an international sailing competition that features high-performance F50 foiling catamarans.

== Results summary ==
=== 2019 SailGP championship statistics ===
Pos	Team	(United States) SFN	(United States) NYC	(United Kingdom) COW (Note: Although the Cowes SailGP was planned to take place over 5 races and a final, the event was shortened due to extreme weather and was awarded to the Australian team.)	(France) MAR	(France) FIN	Points
1	Australia	1	2	1	1	1	49
2	Japan	2	1	2	2	2	46
3	China	6	4	3	3		28
4	(United Kingdom) Great Britain	3	6	5	5		26
6	France	5	5	6	4		24
4	United States	4	3	5	6		26

==== Event wins summary ====
Rank	Team	Winners	Runner-up	Total
1	Australia	4	1	5
2	Japan	1	4	5

==== Season statistics ====
- Events held : 5
- Races held : 29
- Number of host countries : 4
- Number of participating teams : 6
- Top speed : 92.6 km/h / 57.5 mph / 50 kn
- Reached by : Australia
- At event : Cowes Sail Grand Prix

=== 2021–22 SailGP championship statistics ===
Pos	Team	(Bermuda) BMU						(Italy) TRN						(United Kingdom) PLY						(Denmark) AAR						(France) STP						(Spain) CDZ						(Australia) SYD						(United States) SFN						Points
Pos	Team	1	2	3	4	5	F	1	2	3	4	5	F	1	2	3	4	5	F	1	2	3	4	5	F	1	2	3	4	5	F	1	2	3	4	5	F	1	2	3	4	5	F	1	2	3	4	5	GF	Points
1	Australia	1	1	1	2	1	2	DNF	6	8	5	2		1	1	7	7	4	1	2	2	5	2	7	1	8	6	6	8	6		2	4	2	4	1	1	3	7	1	4	2	1	2	4	3	2	1	1	65
2	Japan	3	2	5	DNF	DNS		2	1	3	3	1	1	5	8	5	1	7		5	3	6	1	1	2	2	2	7	1	7	1	4	2	5	6	3		7	1	DNF	1	1		6	2	1	6	4	2	59 (60)
3	United States	4	6	3	DNF	DNS		1	4	1	2	8	3	2	5	1	4	6	3	7	1	3	5	5		5	1	1	7	4	2	3	5	1	3	5	2	6	3	2	3	4	2	5	7	5	5	DNF	3	58
4	(United Kingdom) Great Britain	7	7	2	1	2	1	6	3	7	6	4		8	7	2	3	1		4	5	1	4	2	3	1	5	8	3	5		1	7	4	2	2	DNF	2	4	DNF	WH	WH		1	6	4	3	2		50 (54)
5	New Zealand	6	8	8	4	5		3	8	5	1	7		6	6	4	2	8		3	6	2	8	3		4	3	3	2	8		5	6	8	1	6		5	8	5	2	3		3	5	8	1	3		47 (48)
6	Denmark	8	5	7	6	6		7	5	6	4	3		7	2	6	5	3		1	4	7	6	8		6	7	2	5	1		6	3	3	5	7		4	5	4	7	5		4	1	6	7	5		45
7	Spain	5	3	6	3	3		4	2	4	7	5	2	4	4	DSQ	5	5		DNS	DNS	DNS	3	4		3	4	4	6	2	3	7	1	6	DNS	DNS		1	2	3	6	6	3	8	3	2	8	DNF		42 (44)
8	France	2	4	4	5	4	3	5	7	2	8	6		3	3	3	8	2	2	6	7	4	7	6		7	8	5	4	3		8	8	7	7	4		8	6	6	5	7		7	8	7	4	6		39 (40)

==== Event wins summary ====
Rank	Team	Winners	Runner-up	3rd place	Total
1	Australia	5	1	0	6
2	Japan	2	1	1	4
3	(United Kingdom) Great Britain	1	1	1	3
4	United States	0	3	2	5
5	(Spain) Los Gallos	0	1	2	3
6	France	0	1	1	2

==== Season statistics ====
- Events held : 8
- Races held : 48
- Number of host countries : 7
- Number of participating teams : 8
- Top speed : 94.8 km/h / 58.9 mph / 51.2 kn
- Reached by : (United Kingdom) Great Britain
- At event : Bermuda Sail Grand Prix presented by Hamilton Princess

=== 2022–23 SailGP championship statistics ===
Pos	Team	(Bermuda) BMU						(United States) CHI						(United Kingdom) PLY						(Denmark) COP (Note: The Danish round was scheduled to be held over August 19–20, but the first day of racing was cancelled due to a lack of wind. The event was therefore shortened from five fleet races to three.)				(France) STP (Note: The Saint-Tropez SailGP was scheduled over six fleet races. As no team crossed the finish line within the time window allowed, the fifth race was terminated. The sixth race was cancelled entirely.)							(Spain) CDZ						(United Arab Emirates) DUB							(Singapore) SGP (Note: The Singaporean round was scheduled over five fleet races but was shortened to four fleet races due to low winds.)						(Australia) SYD (Note: The Sydney round was scheduled over six fleet races and a final, but the entire second day of racing was cancelled following severe weather overnight, which damaged several catamarans and left conditions unsuitable.)			(New Zealand) CHR						(United States) SFN						Points
Pos	Team	1	2	3	4	5	F	1	2	3	4	5	F	1	2	3	4	5	F	1	2	3	F	1	2	3	4	5	6	F	1	2	3	4	5	F	1	2	3	4	5	6	F	1	2	3	4	5	F	1	2	3	1	2	3	4	5	F	1	2	3	4	5	GF	Points
1	Australia	4	5	3	4	1	1	7	2	3	9	1	1	6	1	4	3	3	2	5	3	4		5	1	7	7	DNF	C		6	1	2	2	6	3	8	8	4	5	1	3	1	2	2	7	4	C	3	3	4	6	4	2	9	1	1	3	1	3	1	2	1	1	94
2	New Zealand	7	3	8	1	7		1	5	4	5	8		2	2	1	5	1	1	1	1	1	1	1	4	1	2	DNF	C	2	1	6	5	8	7		4	2	7	1	6	5		1	5	2	3	C	1	9	3	4	2	1	2	2	3	2	4	7	3	6	7	2	78 (82)
3	(United Kingdom) Emirates Great Britain (Note: Emirates served as the British team's title sponsor beginning at the Australia SailGP (round nine).)	1	8	1	5	4	2	2	3	2	3	5	3	4	4	6	1	4						2	9	4	3	DNF	C	3	8	2	1	3	9		6	1	1	2	3	4	3	5	3	5	5	C		6	6	2	3	4	3	4	6		2	1	2	4	5	3	77
4	France	9	2	2	DSQ	8		9	8	6	1	4		3	3	5	4	9		6	4	2	2	6	6	2	5	DNF	C		2	4	3	5	3	1	2	6	6	3	8	2	2	7	9	4	6	C		1	1	1	1	6	5	3	7		6	8	6	1	6		75
5	Canada	2	1	5	7	5	3	4	1	1	2	2	2	1	9	3	9	7		4	5	7		8	7	6	9	DNF	C		7	8	6	1	1		1	5	8	4	9	8		4	4	9	7	C		5	7	7	5	3	1	6	4	1	8	2	5	5	2		67
6	Denmark	5	9	4	3	3		3	4	8	6	7		8	5	2	2	2	3	3	2	3	3	9	3	8	6	DNF	C		9	7	9	4	2		3	3	9	6	4	DNF		3	6	3	1	C	2	4	8	3	7	8	8	7	8		5	6	4	3	4		67
7	United States	3	7	7	6	2		8	9	7	7	3		9	6	7	5	5		2	6	6		3	2	3	1	DNF	C	1	3	5	4	6	4	2	7	4	2	9	2	7		8	1	8	8	C		2	2	5	8	5	4	9	2		7	4	7	7	3		56 (64)
8	Switzerland	8	6	6	8	6		6	7	9	4	9		5	7	8	8	8		7	7	5		7	8	5	4	DNF	C		5	9	8	9	5		5	7	3	8	7	6		6	8	1	2	C		7	9	8	6	7	6	8	5		3	5	9	9	9		33 (35)
9	Spain	6	4	9	2	9		5	6	5	8	6		7	8	9	7	6		8	8	8		4	5	9	8	DNF	C		4	3	7	7	8		9	9	5	7	5	1		9	7	6	9	C		8	5	9	9	9	7	5	9		9	9	8	8	8		31 (33)

==== Event wins summary ====
Rank	Team	Winners	Runner-up	3rd place	Total
1	Australia	4	1	4	9
2	New Zealand	3	2	0	5
3	France	2	2	0	4
4	United States	1	2	0	3
5	Canada	1	1	2	4
6	(United Kingdom) Emirates Great Britain	0	2	3	5
7	Denmark	0	1	2	3

==== Season statistics ====
- Events held : 11
- Races held : 61
- Number of host countries : 10
- Number of participating teams : 9
- Top speed : 99.94 km/h / 62.1 mph / 54 kn
- Reached by : France
- At event : Range Rover France Sail Grand Prix | Saint-Tropez

=== 2023–24 SailGP championship statistics ===
Pos	Team	(United States) CHI						(United States) LOS						(France) STP						(Italy) TRN						(Spain) CDZ						(United Arab Emirates) DUB						(United Arab Emirates) ABD						(Australia) SYD						(New Zealand) CHR (Note: The first day of racing in Christchurch was cancelled due to marine life in the race area.)				(Bermuda) BMU						(Canada) HAL						(United States) NYC					(United States) SFN						Points
Pos	Team	1	2	3	4	5	F	1	2	3	4	5	F	1	2	3	4	5	F	1	2	3	4	5	F	1	2	3	4	5	F	1	2	3	4	5	F	1	2	3	4	5	F	1	2	3	4	5	F	1	2	3	F	1	2	3	4	5	F	1	2	3	4	5	F	1	2	3	4	F	1	2	3	4	5	F	Points
1	Spain	6	9	4	1	7		6	3	2	1	9	1	8	4	7	2	2	3	8	8	7	2	3		1	6	3	4	10		10	8	2	DNS	9		10	1	1	10	1	2	4	1	8	7	6		3	2	4		7	6	1	3	4	1	1	4	8	7	1		7	4	6	7		7	7	5	6	4	1	81
2	Australia	1	5	1	4	5	2	1	2	4	2	1	3	5	1	8	5	1	2	1	1	5	5	7	DNF	5	2	1	6	2	3	3	1	3	4	8	2	2	9	6	1	9		1	2	4	5	8	1	DNF	DNS	DNS		1	1	3	8	2	3	8	6	1	6	DNF		3	6	9	1		5	1	8	1	1	2	88
3	New Zealand	4	2	2	3	6	1	4	5	10	7	6		1	6	5	DNS	DNS								4	5	8	2	5		6	2	4	2	4	1	1	10	2	6	6	1	3	5	1	2	7	3	1	4	2	1	3	4	4	6	1	2	5	2	4	5	5		5	3	4	2	1	4	4	4	3	7	3	100
4	Rockwool Denmark	5	4	3	10	4		3	1	5	4	3	2	3	7	2	4	6		6	3	1	9	9		3	4	2	1	1	2	4	5	10	3	5		5	4	8	8	8		2	3	2	4	4	2	8	8	6		6	3	2	4	8		6	1	5	4	4	3	2	8	5	10		2	8	1	4	2		76
5	(United Kingdom) Emirates Great Britain	2	7	8	6	10		2	6	1	9	8		2	8	3	1	3	1	2	2	3	1	2	DNF	8	10	6	7	6		5	7	1	1	DSQ		7	7	7	5	4		9	6	7	6	5		4	3	8		8	5	5	7	7		3	5	2	3	2	1	1	7	2	5	3	6	2	2	5	5		74
6	Canada	3	1	5	5	2	3	5	7	3	3	4		10	5	9	3	8		5	5	4	6	4		7	7	5	5	3		1	3	8	7	1	3	3	6	5	7	5		10	10	10	8	2		5	1	3	3	2	2	6	2	9		7	3	3	1	7		4	2	1	4	2	3	5	6	2	3		71
7	France	7	3	9	9	3		8	9	6	8	7		6	2	4	9	9		3	4	2	7	6		9	1	7	9	7		2	4	7	5	2		4	3	9	2	7		5	4	3	9	1		2	5	1	2	4	9	8	9	3		2	7	6	2	3	2	9	5	3	3		1	3	3	9	DNS		67
8	United States	9	10	6	2	8		7	4	8	5	2		9	3	1	8	7		4	6	8	3	1	DNF	2	3	10	3	4	1	8	9	9	9	3		9	2	3	4	3	3	6	9	9	10	3		9	9	9								10	10	10	WH	WH		10	10	10	9		9	10	10	7	6		52
9	Germany	8	8	7	7	9		9	8	9	10	5		7	9	6	7	4		9	DNS	DNS	4	5		6	9	9	8	8		9	DSQ	5	8	7		6	5	10	3	2		8	8	5	1	9		6	6	5		5	8	7	5	5		4	9	9	WH	6		8	9	7	8		8	9	7	8	9		38
10	Switzerland	10	6	10	8	1		10	10	7	6	10		4	10	10	6	5		7	7	6	8	8		DSQ	8	4	10	9		7	6	6	6	6		8	8	4	9	10		7	7	6	3	10		7	7	7		9	7	9	1	6		9	8	7	WH	WH		6	1	8	6		10	6	9	10	4		34

==== Event wins summary ====
Rank	Team	Winners	Runner-up	3rd place	Total
1	(New Zealand) Black Foils	5	1	1	7
2	(United Kingdom) Emirates Great Britain	3	0	2	5
3	Australia	2	4	3	9
4	(Spain) Los Gallos	2	1	1	4
5	United States	1	0	2	3
6	Rockwool Denmark	0	4	1	5
7	France	0	2	0	2
8	(Canada) NorthStar	0	1	3	4

==== Season statistics ====
- Events held : 13
- Races held : 75
- Number of host countries : 10
- Number of participating teams : 10
- Top speed : 93.96 km/h / 58.4 mph / 50.7 kn
- Reached by : (United Kingdom) Emirates Great Britain
- At event : Rockwool Canada Sail Grand Prix | Halifax

=== 2024–25 SailGP championship statistics ===
Pos	Team	(United Arab Emirates) DUB	(New Zealand) AKL	(Australia) SYD	(United States) LA	(United States) SFN	(United States) NYC	(United Kingdom) PSM	(Germany) SAS	(France) STP	(Switzerland) GEN	(Spain) CDZ	(United Arab Emirates) ABD	(United Arab Emirates) FIN	Points (Note: Numbers in brackets show the amount of points before penalties or awarded points)
1	(United Kingdom) Emirates GBR	2	3	1	4	7	8	2	3	1	4	1	6	1	90
2	(Australia) Bonds Flying Roos	5	1	3	3	4	5	4	2	5	2	7	11	2	80
3	(New Zealand) Black Foils	1	4	8	2	5	2	1	4	2	8	2	9	3	84
4	(Spain) Los Gallos	4	2	7	5	1	1	6	6	3	5	5	10		77
5	France	DNS	DNS	6	6	3	3	10	1	6	7	6	3		69 (59)
6	(Canada) NorthStar	7	10	2	1	2	7	8	8	10	9	10	4		55
7	(Denmark) Rockwool Racing	6	5	4	12	12	6	7	7	7	6	4	1		48 (56)
8	Switzerland	8	7	5	10	6	9	3	12	9	3	11	8		41
9	Germany by Deutsche Bank	9	8	11	7	10	10	11	5	4	1	3	7		35 (47)
10	Red Bull Italy	11	6	9	8	8	11	5	10	9	11	12	2		31
11	Mubadala Brazil	10	9	10	11	9	4	8	DNS	8	12	9	12		16 (20)
12	United States	3	11	12	9	11	12	12	11	11	10	8	5		2 (20)

==== Event wins summary ====
Rank	Team	Winners	Runner-up	3rd place	Total
1	(United Kingdom) Emirates Great Britain	3	2	2	7
2	(New Zealand) Black Foils	2	4	0	6
3	(Spain) Los Gallos	2	1	1	4
4	(Australia) BONDS Flying Roos	1	2	2	5
5	(Canada) NorthStar	1	2	0	3
6	France	1	0	3	4
7	Germany	1	0	1	2
8	Denmark	1	0	0	1
9	Italy	0	1	0	1
10	Switzerland	0	0	2	2
11	United States	0	0	1	1

==== Season statistics ====
- Events held : 12
- Races held : 86
- Number of host countries : 10
- Number of participating teams : 12
- Top speed : 103.93 km/h / 64.58 mph / 56.1 kn
- Reached by : (Denmark) Rockwool Racing SailGP Team
- At event : Germany Sail Grand Prix | Sassnitz

=== Rankings ===
Rank	SailGP 2019
1st place, gold medalist(s)	Australia
2nd place, silver medalist(s)	Japan
3rd place, bronze medalist(s)	China
4	(United Kingdom) Great Britain
5	France
6	United States

Rank	SailGP 2021–22
1st place, gold medalist(s)	Australia
2nd place, silver medalist(s)	Japan
3rd place, bronze medalist(s)	United States
4	(United Kingdom) Great Britain
5	New Zealand
6	Denmark
7	Spain
8	France

Rank	SailGP 2022–23
1st place, gold medalist(s)	Australia
2nd place, silver medalist(s)	New Zealand
3rd place, bronze medalist(s)	(United Kingdom) Great Britain
4	France
5	Canada
6	Denmark
7	United States
8	Switzerland
9	Spain

Rank	SailGP 2023–24
1st place, gold medalist(s)	Spain
2nd place, silver medalist(s)	Australia
3rd place, bronze medalist(s)	New Zealand
4	Denmark
5	(United Kingdom) Great Britain
6	Canada
7	France
8	United States
9	Germany
10	Switzerland

Rank	SailGP 2024–25
1st place, gold medalist(s)	(United Kingdom) Great Britain
2nd place, silver medalist(s)	Australia
3rd place, bronze medalist(s)	New Zealand
4	Spain
5	France
6	Canada
7	Denmark
8	Switzerland
9	Germany
10	Italy
11	Brazil
12	United States

Tables current through the end of Season 5

== Medals summary ==
Rank	Team	Winners	Runner-up	3rd place	Total
1	Australia	3	1	1	5
2	(United Kingdom) Great Britain	1	0	1	2
3	(Spain) Los Gallos	1	0	0	1
4	Japan	0	2	0	2
5	New Zealand	0	1	2	3
6	China	0	0	1	1
6	United States	0	0	1	1

Table current through the end of Season 5

=== Past winners ===
Year	Winners	Runner-up	3rd place
2019	Australia; Tom Slingsby	Japan; Nathan Outteridge	China; Phil Robertson
2021–22	Australia; Tom Slingsby	Japan; Nathan Outteridge	United States; Jimmy Spithill
2022–23	Australia; Tom Slingsby	New Zealand; Peter Burling	(United Kingdom) Great Britain; Ben Ainslie
2023–24	Spain; Diego Botín	Australia; Tom Slingsby	New Zealand; Peter Burling
2024–25	(United Kingdom) Great Britain; Dylan Fletcher	Australia; Tom Slingsby	New Zealand; Peter Burling

== Team participations ==
=== Appearance ===
==== Team appearance ====
Team	Season			Event Final			Season Final			Best season result
Team	App.	First	Last	App.	First	Last	App.	First	Last	Best season result
(Australia) BONDS Flying Roos	5	2019	2025	28	2019	2025	5	2019	2025	Champions (2019, 2022, 2023)
Mubadala Brazil	1	2024	2025	0	-		0	-		None
(Canada) NorthStar	3	2022	2025	10	2022	2025	0	-		5th (2023)
China	1	2019		0	-		0	-		3rd (2019)
Rockwool Denmark	4	2021	2025	7	2022	2024	0	-		4th (2024)
France	5	2019	2025	10	2021	2025	0	-		4th (2023)
Germany Deutsche Bank	2	2023	2025	2	2025		0	-		9th (2024)
(United Kingdom) Emirates Great Britain	5	2019	2025	17	2021	2025	2	2023	2025	Champions (2025)
Red Bull Italy	1	2024	2025	0	-		0	-		None
Japan	2	2019	2022	6	2019	2021	2	2019	2022	2nd (2019, 2022)
(New Zealand) Black Foils	4	2021	2025	16	2022	2025	3	2023	2025	2nd (2023)
(Spain) Los Gallos	4	2021	2025	10	2021	2025	1	2024		Champions (2024)
(Sweden) Artemis Racing	0	2026		0	-		0	-		None
Switzerland	2	2023	2025	2	2025		0	-		8th (2023)
United States	5	2019	2025	11	2021	2024	1	2022		3rd (2022)

Table was last updated on 30 November 2025

==== Helmsman appearance ====
N	Helmsman	2019		2021–22		2022–23		2023–24		2024–25		Total
N	Helmsman	Team	App.	Team	App.	Team	App.	Team	App.	Team	App.	Total
(United Kingdom)	Ben Ainslie	–	0	(United Kingdom) Great Britain	6	(United Kingdom) Great Britain	10	(United Kingdom) Great Britain	6	–	0	22
(France)	Billy Besson	France	5	France	5	–	0	–	0	–	0	10
(Spain)	Diego Botín	–	0	–	0	(Spain) Los Gallos	3	(Spain) Los Gallos	13	(Spain) Los Gallos	12	28
(New Zealand)	Peter Burling	–	0	New Zealand	6	New Zealand	11	New Zealand	11	New Zealand	12	40
(United States)	Taylor Canfield	–	0	–	0	–	0	United States	7	United States	11	18
(France)	Quentin Delapierre	–	0	France	3	France	11	France	13	France	10	37
(United Kingdom)	Dylan Fletcher	(United Kingdom) Great Britain	5	–	0	–	0	–	0	(United Kingdom) Great Britain	12	17
(United Kingdom)	Paul Goodison	–	0	(United Kingdom) Great Britain	2	–	0	–	0	–	0	2
(Brazil)	Martine Grael	–	0	–	0	–	0	–	0	Brazil	11	11
(Germany)	Erik Heil	–	0	–	0	–	0	Germany	13	Germany	12	25
(United States)	Rome Kirby	United States	5	–	0	–	0	–	0	–	0	5
(Australia)	Nathan Outteridge	Japan	5	Japan	8	Switzerland	2	Denmark	1	–	0	22
(Australia)	Nathan Outteridge	Japan	5	Japan	8	Switzerland	2	New Zealand	1	–	0	22
(Australia)	Nathan Outteridge	Japan	5	Japan	8	Switzerland	2	Switzerland	5	–	0	22
(Switzerland)	Arnaud Psarofaghis	–	0	New Zealand	2	–	0	–	0	–	0	2
(New Zealand)	Phil Robertson	China	5	(Spain) Los Gallos	7	Canada	11	Canada	13	Italy	1	37
(Switzerland)	Sébastien Schneiter	–	0	–	0	Switzerland	9	Switzerland	8	Switzerland	12	29
(United Kingdom)	Giles Scott	–	0	–	0	–	0	(United Kingdom) Great Britain	7	Canada	12	19
(Denmark)	Nicolai Sehested	–	0	Denmark	8	Denmark	11	Denmark	12	Denmark	11	42
(Australia)	Tom Slingsby	Australia	5	Australia	8	Australia	11	Australia	12	Australia	12	48
(Australia)	Jimmy Spithill	–	0	United States	8	United States	11	Australia	1	–	0	25
(Australia)	Jimmy Spithill	–	0	United States	8	United States	11	United States	5	–	0	25
(Italy)	Ruggero Tita	–	0	–	0	–	0	–	0	Italy	11	11
(Spain)	Jordi Xammar	–	0	(Spain) Los Gallos	1	(Spain) Los Gallos	8	–	0	–	0	9

Table was last updated on 30 November 2025

=== Team performances by season ===
Team		2019			2021–22			2022–23			2023–24			2024–25		
Team		EF	EW	RK	EF	EW	RK	EF	EW	RK	EF	EW	RK	EF	EW	RK
(Australia)	BONDS Flying Roos	3; 100%	4; 133.3%	1	5; 71.4%▼	5; 100%▼	1	7; 77.8%▲	4; 57.1%▼	1	8; 66.7%▼	2; 22.2%▼	2	5; 50%▼	1; 20%▼	2
(Brazil)	Mubadala Brazil	did not participate												0; 0%	0	11
(Canada)	NorthStar	did not participate						3; 33.3%	1; 33.3%	5	4; 33.3%	0; 0%▼	6	3; 30%▼	1; 33.3%▲	6
(China)	China	0; 0%	0	3	did not participate											
(Denmark)	Rockwool Denmark	did not participate			0; 0%	0	6	3; 33.3%▲	0; 0%	6	4; 33.3%	0; 0%	4	0; 0%▼	1 ▲	7
(France)	France	0; 0%	0	5	2; 28.6%▲	0; 0%	8	3; 33.3%▲	2; 66.7%▲	4	2; 16.7%▼	0; 0%▼	7	3; 30%▲	1; 33.3%▲	5
(Germany)	Germany Deutsche Bank	did not participate									0; 0%	0	9	2; 20%▲	1; 50%	9
(United Kingdom)	Emirates Great Britain	0; 0%	0	4	3; 42.9%▲	1; 33.3%▲	4	4; 44.4%▲	0; 0%▼	3	4; 33.3%▼	3; 75%▲	5	6; 60%▲	2; 33.3%▼	1
(Italy)	Red Bull Italy	did not participate												0; 0%	0	10
(Japan)	Japan	3; 100%	1; 33.3%	2	3; 42.9%▼	2; 66.7%▲	2	did not participate								
(New Zealand)	Black Foils	did not participate			0; 0%	0	5	4; 44.4%▲	3; 75%▲	2	7; 58.3%▲	5; 71.4%▼	3	5; 50%▼	2; 40%▼	3
(Spain)	Los Gallos	did not participate			3; 42.9%	0; 0%	7	0; 0%▼	0	9	4; 33.3%▲	2; 50%▲	1	3; 30%▼	2; 66.7%▲	4
(Sweden)	Artemis Racing	did not participate														
(Switzerland)	Switzerland	did not participate						0; 0%	0	8	0; 0%	0	10	2; 20%▲	0; 0%	8
(United States)	United States	0; 0%	0	6	5; 71.4%▲	0; 0%	3	2; 22.2%▼	1; 50%▲	7	3; 25%▲	1; 33.3%▼	8	1; 10%▼	0; 0%▼	12

The percentage of event finals won may be inflated, as teams are still awarded a win if the final race does not happen.
Table was last updated on 30 November 2025

== Awards ==
=== Fan voted End-of-Season Awards ===
Category	2023–24
Best driver	(New Zealand) Peter Burling (New Zealand) Black Foils
Best wing trimmer	(Spain) Florián Trittel (Spain) Los Gallos
Best flight controller	Jason Waterhouse; Australia
Best strategist	(New Zealand) Liv Mackay (New Zealand) Black Foils
Best grinding team	(Canada) Tom Ramshaw (Canada) Jareese Finch (Canada) NorthStar
Best coach	(New Zealand) Ray Davies (New Zealand) Black Foils
Top moment	(Australia) Australia colliding with a race mark in Christchurch
Best racecourse	Halifax, Canada
Impact Moment	(Switzerland) Switzerland women’s F50 training camp in Dubai

Table current through the end of Season 4

== Record speeds ==
Top Speed	Team	Event	Record Set Date	Record Duration
50 kn 92.6 km/h 57.5 mph	Australia	(United Kingdom) Cowes Sail Grand Prix	10 August 2019	1 year, 8 months, 14 days (623 days)
51.19 kn 94.8 km/h 58.9 mph	(United Kingdom) Great Britain	Bermuda Sail Grand Prix presented by Hamilton Princess	24 April 2021	4 months, 18 days (140 days)
53.96 kn 99.94 km/h 62.1 mph	France	Range Rover France Sail Grand Prix | Saint-Tropez	11 September 2021	3 years, 11 months, 5 days (1435 days)
56.2 kn 103.93 km/h 64.58 mph	Denmark	Germany Sail Grand Prix | Sassnitz	16 August 2025	3 months, 14 days (106 days) as of 30 November 2025
