= United States SailGP Team =

SailGP Team

- Team logo

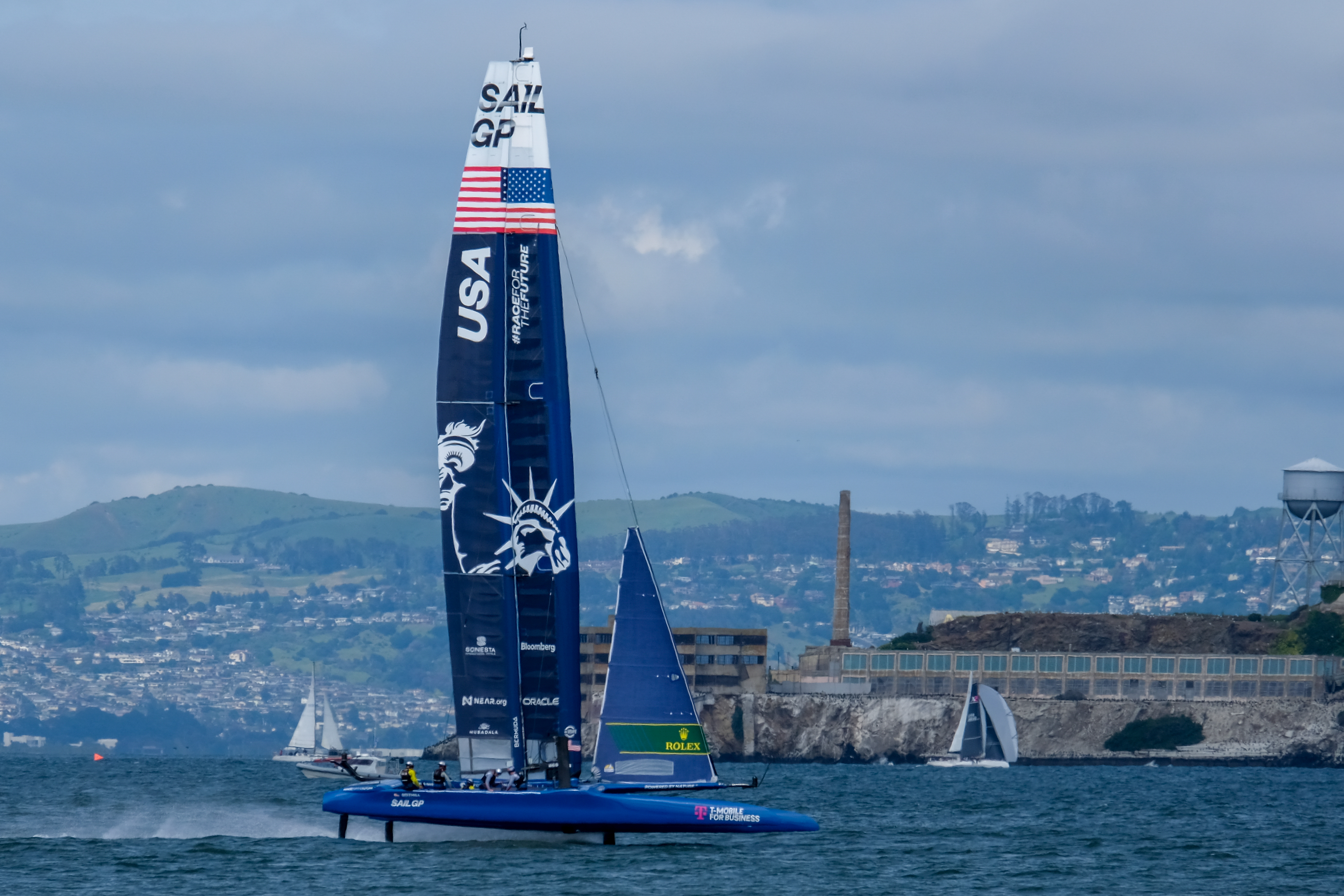

United States SailGP Team
- Esablished: 2019
- CEO & Team Principal: (United States) Mike Buckley
- Drivers: (United States) Taylor Canfield
- Wing Trimmer: (United States) Michael Menninger
- Flight Controller: (United States) Hans Henken
- Strategists: (United States) Andrew Campbell (United States) Lousia Nordstrom
- Grinders: (United States) Anna Weis (United States) Mac Agnese (United States) Peter Kinney
- Athlete: (United States) Harry Melges IV
- Head Coach: (England) Marcus Lynch
- Head Trainer: (New Zealand) Craig McFarlane
- Race Engineer: (Croatia) Ivan Bulaja

SailGP Career
- First Entry: 2019 Sydney Sail Grand Prix
- SailGP Championships: 0
- Website: www.ussailgpteam.com

United States SailGP Team is an American sailing team which participates in the Rolex SailGP Championship .

== History ==
=== 2019 Season ===
United States SailGP Team was established in 2019 by F50 League LLC as a part of the inaugural season of the SailGP competition. America has a long history in sailing, and many former America's Cup races sailors were, and still are on the team. In the league's inaugural race in Sydney, Australia, the team, helmed by America's Cup and Volvo Ocean Race sailor Rome Kirby, finished last out of the six competing boats with a best fleet race finish of 3rd in race 2. After a best result of 3rd during round 3 in New York, they went on to finish the season in last place

=== 2021-22 Season ===
The delayed second season of SailGP saw Australian Jimmy Spithill take over as helm, taking the team to both their first event final in Taranto, Italy where they finished 3rd behind Spain and Japan, and their first Grand Final. They finished 3rd in the later event behind Japan and winners Australia. This has been their best season finish to date. In 2021 the team started a diversity program to help funnel more people into the sport.

=== 2022-23 Season ===
Spithill's second season saw hit form falter, failing to reach the top three in any of the first four rounds. Despite this, in Saint-Tropez he took the team to their first event win, beating New Zealand and Great Britain to do so. The team kept the momentum, finishing 2nd place in Cádiz the next race, but failed to reach a final agin that season. The team suffered their worst result yet that season, coming 7th out of nine boats.

=== 2023-24 Season ===
In 2023 Jimmy Spithill announced his departure from the United States SailGP team, which he had led since 2020, to help form the Red Bull Italy SailGP Team that debuted the next season. Spithill sailed the first 5 rounds of the season before beiong replaced by American Taylor Canfield, who won the 2013 and 2020 World Match Racing Tour. This season, despite three top three finishes and an event win in Cádiz, the team suffered from the mid season helm change, finishing 8th, only ahead of Switzerland and new team Germany.

== Results ==
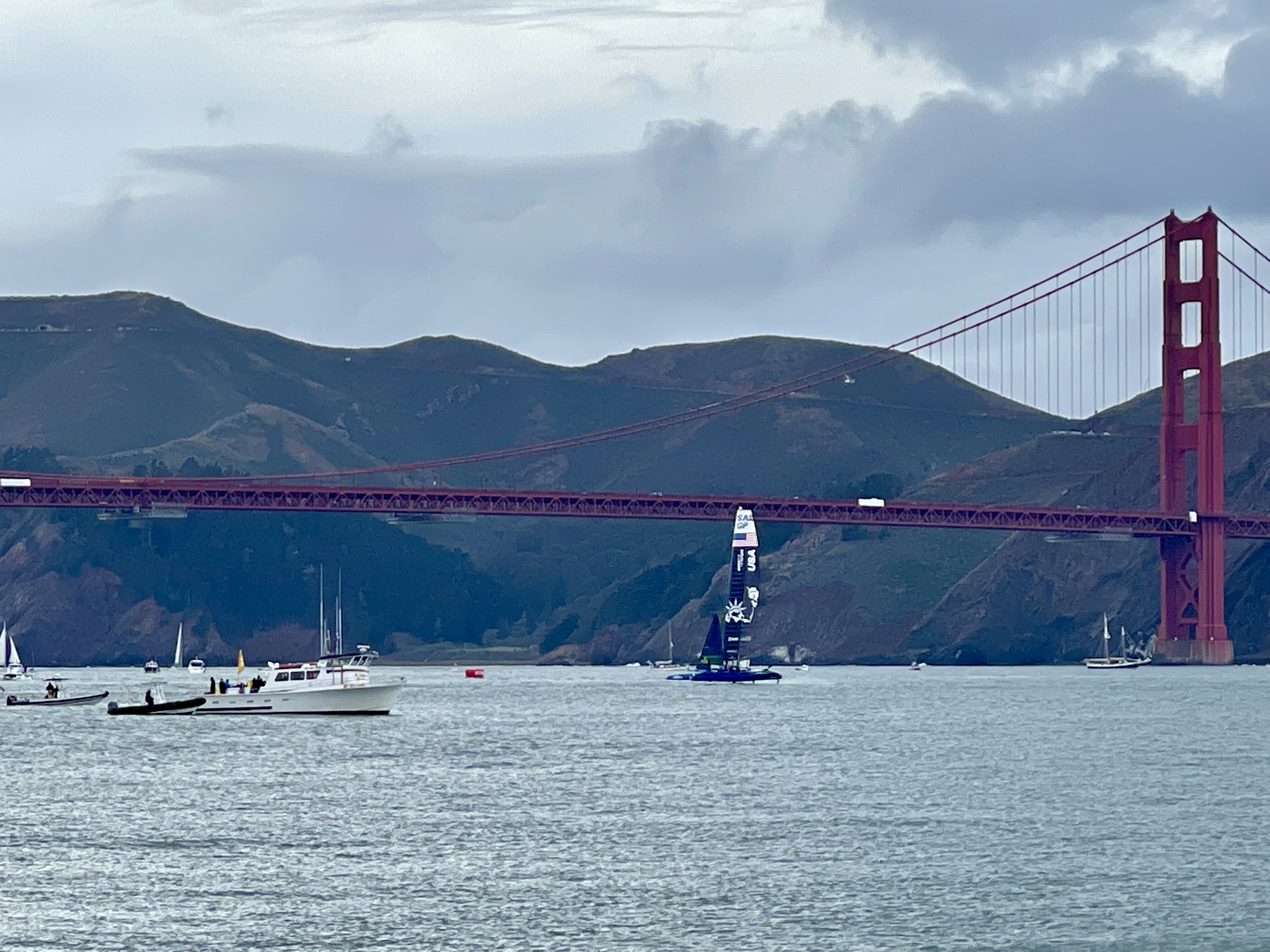
The US F50 sailing with the Golden Gate Bridge in the background

Season	Driver	Position
2019	(United States) Rome Kirby	6th
2021-22	(Australia) Jimmy Spithill	3rd
2022-23	(Australia) Jimmy Spithill	7th
2023-24	(Australia) Jimmy Spithill (United States) Taylor Canfield	8th
2024–25	(United States) Taylor Canfield	12th
2026	(United States) Taylor Canfield (Brazil) Martine Grael	4th*

== See also ==
- F50 (catamaran)
- Yacht racing
