= 2022–23 SailGP championship =

3rd season of SailGP sailing competition

2022–23 SailGP Championship
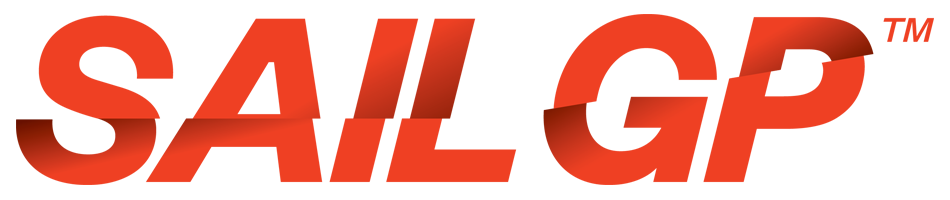

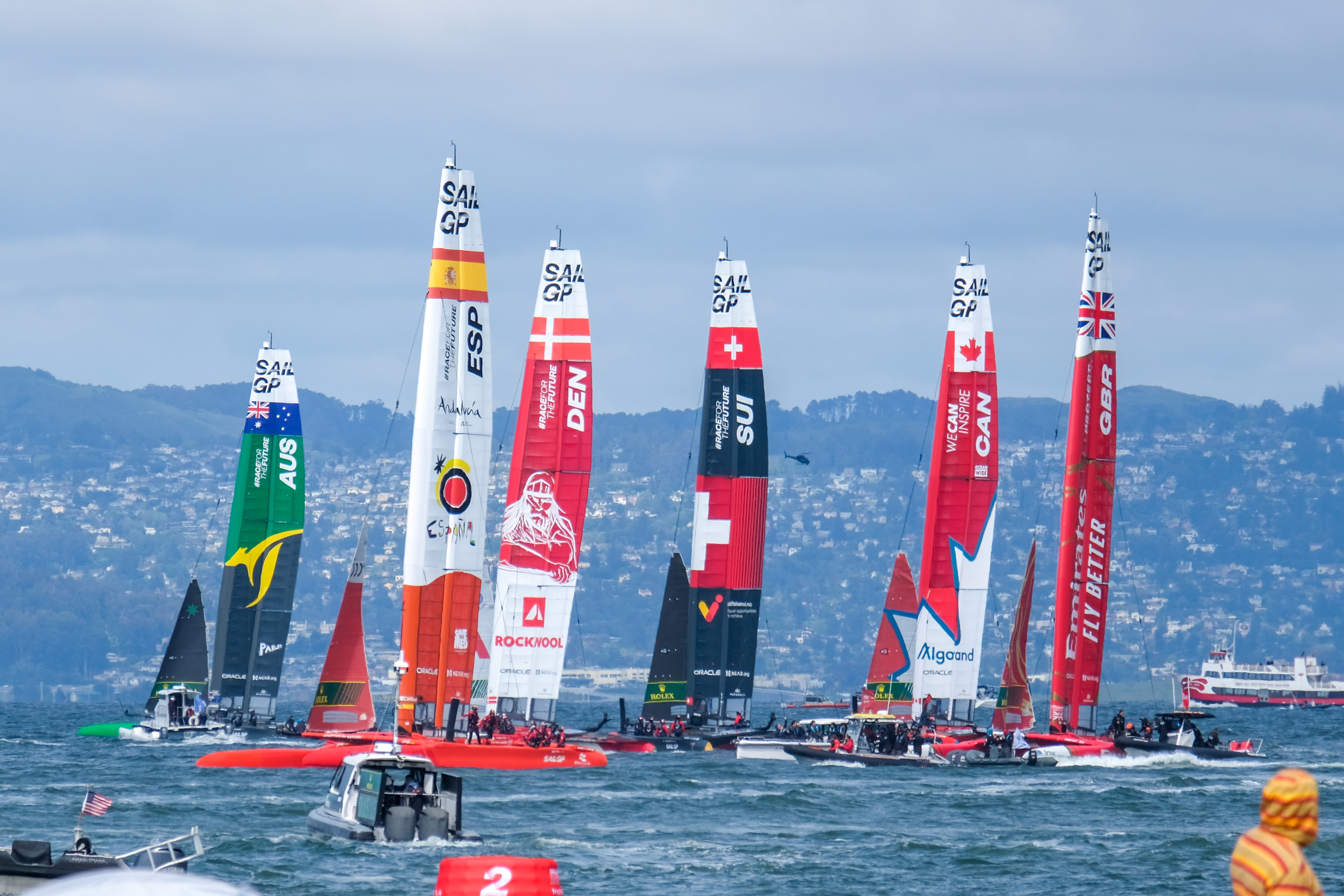

Event title
- Name: 2022–23 SailGP Championship
- Dates: May 14, 2022 to May 7, 2023
- Yachts: F50

Results
- Winner: Australia (3rd title)
- Impact League: Denmark

The 2022–23 SailGP Championship was the third season of the SailGP championship. The season was contested over eleven sail grands prix held at venues around the world. The season saw Australia SailGP Team win their third season title, with Denmark SailGP Team winning the impact league.

== Entries ==
| Team | Helmsman | Rounds |
|---|---|---|
| Australia SailGP Team | (Australia) Tom Slingsby | All |
| Canada SailGP Team | (New Zealand) Phil Robertson | All |
| Denmark SailGP Team presented by Rockwool | (Denmark) Nicolai Sehested | All |
| France SailGP Team | (France) Quentin Delapierre | All |
| (United Kingdom) Great Britain SailGP Team; (United Kingdom) Emirates Great Britain SailGP Team (Note: Emirates served as the British team's title sponsor beginning at the Australia SailGP (round nine).) | (United Kingdom) Ben Ainslie | 1–3, 5–11 |
| New Zealand SailGP Team | (New Zealand) Peter Burling | All |
| Spain SailGP Team | (Spain) Jordi Xammar | 1–8 |
| Spain SailGP Team | (Spain) Diego Botín | 9–11 |
| Switzerland SailGP Team | (Switzerland) Sébastien Schneiter | 1–3, 6–11 |
| Switzerland SailGP Team | (Australia) Nathan Outteridge | 4–5 |
| United States SailGP Team | (Australia) Jimmy Spithill | All |
Citations:

=== Team changes ===
Canada and Switzerland joined the championship, increasing the number of teams to nine.

Japan SailGP Team participation has been indefinitely paused during the 2022–23 season due to a shortage of F50 yachts. Since new entrants Canada and Switzerland are self-funded, Japan was selected from the centrally-funded teams to give up their yacht due to a lack of sponsorship for the team. Japan's former helm and CEO Nathan Outteridge has since signed onto the Swiss SailGP Team and served as skipper in recent regattas.

== Calendar ==
Four new venues joined the schedule with the additions of Chicago, Dubai, Singapore and New Zealand. Italy will not continue as a venue for this season. Denmark's location moved from Aarhus to Copenhagen. Sydney was not on the original schedule, but later entered into a three-year contract to start with the third season.

| Rnd | Host | Title | Dates | Winning team |
|---|---|---|---|---|
| 1 | Bermuda | Bermuda Sail Grand Prix presented by Hamilton Princess | May 14–15, 2022 | Australia |
| 2 | Chicago, United States | T-Mobile United States Sail Grand Prix | Chicago at Navy Pier | June 18–19, 2022 | Australia |
| 3 | (United Kingdom) Plymouth, England | Great Britain Sail Grand Prix | Plymouth | July 30–31, 2022 | New Zealand |
| 4 | Copenhagen, Denmark | Rockwool Denmark Sail Grand Prix | Copenhagen | August 20, 2022 (Note: The Danish round was scheduled to be held over August 19–20, but the first day of racing was cancelled due to a lack of wind. The event was therefore shortened from five fleet races to three.) | New Zealand |
| 5 | Saint-Tropez, France | Range Rover France Sail Grand Prix | Saint-Tropez | September 10–11, 2022 | United States |
| 6 | Cádiz, Spain | Spain Sail Grand Prix | Andalucía – Cádiz presented by NEAR | September 24–25, 2022 | France |
| 7 | Dubai, United Arab Emirates | Dubai Sail Grand Prix presented by P&O Marinas | November 11–12, 2022 | Australia |
| 8 | Singapore | Singapore Sail Grand Prix | January 14–15, 2023 | New Zealand |
| 9 | (Australia) Sydney | KPMG Australia Sail Grand Prix | Sydney | February 18, 2023 (Note: The Sydney round was scheduled over six fleet races and a final, but the entire second day of racing was cancelled following severe weather overnight, which damaged several catamarans and left conditions unsuitable.) | France (Note: Due to severe weather, the second day of racing in Sydney was cancelled. The French team were declared winners of the event.) |
| 10 | Christchurch, New Zealand | ITM New Zealand Sail Grand Prix | Christchurch | March 18–19, 2023 | Canada |
| 11 | (United States) San Francisco, US | Mubadala SailGP Season 3 Grand Final | San Francisco | May 6–7, 2023 | Australia |
Citations:

== Season ==
=== Round 4: Denmark ===
Great Britain did not participate in the regatta after hitting a rock during a practice session and causing severe damage to their F50. Day 1 of racing on August 19 was cancelled due to light wind.

=== Round 5: Saint-Tropez ===
The Range Rover France Sail Grand Prix event brought two days with wildly different wind conditions. Day 1 featured heavy wind and fast racing with puffs reaching up to 45 km/h. The F50 class speed record was set several times during racing, with the final record set by the French team at 99.94 km/h. Mark roundings were high stakes maneuvers, with most teams intentionally "landing" the boats to scrub speed. There were two near-capsizes from Canada and Denmark, and Australia sustained damage at the end of race one during a sudden de-foil, but the fleet managed the conditions well for three exciting races.

Day 2's wind was at the minimum 10 km/h range so the fleet's modular wings were extended from Day 1's 18 meters to the tallest 29-meter configuration. Although two races were attempted, both courses were shortened and only one was completed within the 14-minute time limit. The event final then featured light air tactics from USA, NZL and GRB hunting for patches of wind to speed them across the finish.

Two teams were penalized points for boat to boat contact: Switzerland was docked 4 event points and 2 championship points for contact with USA during practice. USA was docked 8 event points and 4 championship points for contact with France during race 5.

=== Round 6: Cádiz ===
Race management has increased the time limit for races from 14 minutes to 16 minutes, and decreased the minimum legs from 4 to 3.

== Results ==
Points are awarded per race for the Event Leaderboard, with 10 points for the winner, 9 points for second place, 8 points for third, and so on.

Each event hosts multiple races, with the three highest scoring teams of the event facing off in an additional final race to decide the podium order. The winner of that final wins the event, with the final standings of the event leaderboard used to award points for the Championship Leaderboard. The winner is awarded 10 Championship points, second awarded 9, and so on.

The three highest scoring teams at the end of the season compete in the Sail GP Grand Final with the winning team awarded the championship.

| Pos | Team | (Bermuda) BMU | | | | | | (United States) CHI | | | | | | (United Kingdom) PLY | | | | | | (Denmark) COP | | | | (France) STP (Note: The Saint-Tropez SailGP was scheduled over six fleet races. As no team crossed the finish line within the time window allowed, the fifth race was terminated. The sixth race was cancelled entirely.) | | | | | | | (Spain) CDZ | | | | | | (United Arab Emirates) DUB | | | | | | | (Singapore) SGP (Note: The Singaporean round was scheduled over five fleet races but was shortened to four fleet races due to low winds.) | | | | | | (Australia) SYD | | | (New Zealand) CHR | | | | | | (United States) SFN | | | | | | Points |
| Pos | Team | 1 | 2 | 3 | 4 | 5 | F | 1 | 2 | 3 | 4 | 5 | F | 1 | 2 | 3 | 4 | 5 | F | 1 | 2 | 3 | F | 1 | 2 | 3 | 4 | 5 | 6 | F | 1 | 2 | 3 | 4 | 5 | F | 1 | 2 | 3 | 4 | 5 | 6 | F | 1 | 2 | 3 | 4 | 5 | F | 1 | 2 | 3 | 1 | 2 | 3 | 4 | 5 | F | 1 | 2 | 3 | 4 | 5 | GF | Points |
|---|---|---|---|---|---|---|---|---|---|---|---|---|---|---|---|---|---|---|---|---|---|---|---|---|---|---|---|---|---|---|---|---|---|---|---|---|---|---|---|---|---|---|---|---|---|---|---|---|---|---|---|---|---|---|---|---|---|---|---|---|---|---|---|---|---|
| 1 | Australia | 4 | 5 | 3 | 4 | 1 | 1 | 7 | 2 | 3 | 9 | 1 | 1 | 6 | 1 | 4 | 3 | 3 | 2 | 5 | 3 | 4 | | 5 | 1 | 7 | 7 | DNF | C | | 6 | 1 | 2 | 2 | 6 | 3 | 8 | 8 | 4 | 5 | 1 | 3 | 1 | 2 | 2 | 7 | 4 | C | 3 | 3 | 4 | 6 | 4 | 2 | 9 | 1 | 1 | 3 | 1 | 3 | 1 | 2 | 1 | 1 | 94 |
| 2 | New Zealand | 7 | 3 | 8 | 1 | 7 | | 1 | 5 | 4 | 5 | 8 | | 2 | 2 | 1 | 5 | 1 | 1 | 1 | 1 | 1 | 1 | 1 | 4 | 1 | 2 | DNF | C | 2 | 1 | 6 | 5 | 8 | 7 | | 4 | 2 | 7 | 1 | 6 | 5 | | 1 | 5 | 2 | 3 | C | 1 | 9 | 3 | 4 | 2 | 1 | 2 | 2 | 3 | 2 | 4 | 7 | 3 | 6 | 7 | 2 | 78 (82) |
| 3 | (United Kingdom) Emirates Great Britain | 1 | 8 | 1 | 5 | 4 | 2 | 2 | 3 | 2 | 3 | 5 | 3 | 4 | 4 | 6 | 1 | 4 | | | | | | 2 | 9 | 4 | 3 | DNF | C | 3 | 8 | 2 | 1 | 3 | 9 | | 6 | 1 | 1 | 2 | 3 | 4 | 3 | 5 | 3 | 5 | 5 | C | | 6 | 6 | 2 | 3 | 4 | 3 | 4 | 6 | | 2 | 1 | 2 | 4 | 5 | 3 | 77 |
| 4 | France | 9 | 2 | 2 | DSQ | 8 | | 9 | 8 | 6 | 1 | 4 | | 3 | 3 | 5 | 4 | 9 | | 6 | 4 | 2 | 2 | 6 | 6 | 2 | 5 | DNF | C | | 2 | 4 | 3 | 5 | 3 | 1 | 2 | 6 | 6 | 3 | 8 | 2 | 2 | 7 | 9 | 4 | 6 | C | | 1 | 1 | 1 | 1 | 6 | 5 | 3 | 7 | | 6 | 8 | 6 | 1 | 6 | | 75 |
| 5 | Canada | 2 | 1 | 5 | 7 | 5 | 3 | 4 | 1 | 1 | 2 | 2 | 2 | 1 | 9 | 3 | 9 | 7 | | 4 | 5 | 7 | | 8 | 7 | 6 | 9 | DNF | C | | 7 | 8 | 6 | 1 | 1 | | 1 | 5 | 8 | 4 | 9 | 8 | | 4 | 4 | 9 | 7 | C | | 5 | 7 | 7 | 5 | 3 | 1 | 6 | 4 | 1 | 8 | 2 | 5 | 5 | 2 | | 67 |
| 6 | Denmark | 5 | 9 | 4 | 3 | 3 | | 3 | 4 | 8 | 6 | 7 | | 8 | 5 | 2 | 2 | 2 | 3 | 3 | 2 | 3 | 3 | 9 | 3 | 8 | 6 | DNF | C | | 9 | 7 | 9 | 4 | 2 | | 3 | 3 | 9 | 6 | 4 | DNF | | 3 | 6 | 3 | 1 | C | 2 | 4 | 8 | 3 | 7 | 8 | 8 | 7 | 8 | | 5 | 6 | 4 | 3 | 4 | | 67 |
| 7 | United States | 3 | 7 | 7 | 6 | 2 | | 8 | 9 | 7 | 7 | 3 | | 9 | 6 | 7 | 5 | 5 | | 2 | 6 | 6 | | 3 | 2 | 3 | 1 | DNF | C | 1 | 3 | 5 | 4 | 6 | 4 | 2 | 7 | 4 | 2 | 9 | 2 | 7 | | 8 | 1 | 8 | 8 | C | | 2 | 2 | 5 | 8 | 5 | 4 | 9 | 2 | | 7 | 4 | 7 | 7 | 3 | | 56 (64) |
| 8 | Switzerland | 8 | 6 | 6 | 8 | 6 | | 6 | 7 | 9 | 4 | 9 | | 5 | 7 | 8 | 8 | 8 | | 7 | 7 | 5 | | 7 | 8 | 5 | 4 | DNF | C | | 5 | 9 | 8 | 9 | 5 | | 5 | 7 | 3 | 8 | 7 | 6 | | 6 | 8 | 1 | 2 | C | | 7 | 9 | 8 | 6 | 7 | 6 | 8 | 5 | | 3 | 5 | 9 | 9 | 9 | | 33 (35) |
| 9 | Spain | 6 | 4 | 9 | 2 | 9 | | 5 | 6 | 5 | 8 | 6 | | 7 | 8 | 9 | 7 | 6 | | 8 | 8 | 8 | | 4 | 5 | 9 | 8 | DNF | C | | 4 | 3 | 7 | 7 | 8 | | 9 | 9 | 5 | 7 | 5 | 1 | | 9 | 7 | 6 | 9 | C | | 8 | 5 | 9 | 9 | 9 | 7 | 5 | 9 | | 9 | 9 | 8 | 8 | 8 | | 31 (33) |
Citations:

Key
| Colour | Result |
|---|---|
| 1 | Winner |
| 2 | Second place |
| 3 | Third place |
| 4–9 | Finish |
| DNF | Did not finish |
| DNS | Did not start |
| DSQ | Disqualified |
| WH | Withheld from racing |
| C | Race cancelled |

Notes

- New Zealand SailGP Team were penalised four points in the championship: two for a four-point penalty at Dubai Sail Grand Prix presented by P&O Marinas, and two for a four-point penalty at Singapore Sail Grand Prix.
- United States SailGP Team were penalised eight points in the championship: four for an eight-point penalty at Range Rover France Sail Grand Prix | Saint-Tropez, and four for an eight-point penalty at San Francisco Sail Grand Prix.
- Switzerland SailGP Team were penalised two points in the championship for a four-point penalty at Range Rover France Sail Grand Prix | Saint-Tropez.
- Spain SailGP Team were penalised two points in the championship for a four-point penalty at Great Britain Sail Grand Prix | Plymouth.

== Impact League ==
As part of SailGP's sustainability initiatives, the championship runs a second leaderboard on which teams compete to have the greatest improvement in the sustainability of the sport. Teams are externally audited after each round against 10 criteria, with the top three ranked teams awarded prize money to be donated to the teams' sustainability partners.

=== Standings ===
| Pos | Team | (Bermuda) BMU | (United States) CHI | (United Kingdom) PLY | (Denmark) COP | (France) STP | (Spain) CDZ | (United Arab Emirates) DUB | (Singapore) SGP | (New Zealand) CHR | (United States) SFN | Points |
|---|---|---|---|---|---|---|---|---|---|---|---|---|
| 1 | Denmark | 170 | 169 | 166 | 128 | 139 | 154 | 144 | 163 | 182 | 151 | 1565 |
| 2 | New Zealand | 171 | 163 | 176 | 138 | 130 | 150 | 146 | 163 | 181 | 144 | 1560 |
| 3 | (United Kingdom) Emirates Great Britain | 159 | 164 | 168 | 137 | 135 | 146 | 157 | 153 | 157 | 141 | 1516 |
| 4 | Canada | 167 | 160 | 171 | 121 | 130 | 165 | 162 | 151 | 159 | 127 | 1513 |
| 5 | Spain | 155 | 153 | 166 | 135 | 113 | 155 | 138 | 148 | 154 | 132 | 1459 |
| 6 | France | 160 | 141 | 165 | 133 | 135 | 157 | 145 | 150 | 161 | 103 | 1452 |
| 7 | Australia | 158 | 163 | 169 | 128 | 127 | 126 | 128 | 156 | 178 | 109 | 1440 |
| 8 | United States | 151 | 154 | 168 | 111 | 128 | 156 | 141 | 142 | 156 | 111 | 1417 |
| 9 | Switzerland | 120 | 136 | 169 | 139 | 137 | 132 | 153 | 159 | 165 | 105 | 1413 |
Citation:

== Inspire Racing ==
SailGP, in partnership with Waszp, created Inspire Racing to make foiling more accessible to young sailors, give them opportunity to experience a large sailing competition in all aspects, including racing in front of huge SailGP crowds.

| Location | Winners | Runner-up | 3rd place |
| Bermuda | (Bermuda) Rachel Betschart | (Bermuda) Ethan Thompson | (Bermuda) Christopher Adderley |
| (United States) Chicago | (United States) Gavin Ball | (Canada) Galen Richardson | (United States) JP Lattanzi |
| (United Kingdom) Plymouth | (United Kingdom) Duncan Gregor | (United Kingdom) Jamie Cook | (United Kingdom) Tom Williamson |
| (France) Saint-Tropez | (France) Hippolyte Gruet | (France) Eliott Coville | (France) Joseph Lamiot |
| (Spain) Cádiz | (Spain) Jaime Framis Harguindey | (Spain) Quique Urios Salinas | (Spain) Ian Walker March |
| (Australia) Sydney | (Australia) Louis Tilly | (Australia) Aidan Simmons | (Australia) Keizo Tomishima |
| (New Zealand) Christchurch | (New Zealand) Noah Malpot | (New Zealand) Lucas Day | (New Zealand) Tim Howse |
| (United States) San Francisco – Final | (United States) Gavin Ball (New Zealand) Stella Bilger | (United Kingdom) Duncan Gregor (Bermuda) Rachael Betschart | (France) Hippolyte Gruet (Norway) Hedvig Doksrød |
Citations:
