= Spain SailGP Team =

Spanish sailing team

(Spain) Los Gallos SailGP Team
- Spain SailGP Team logo

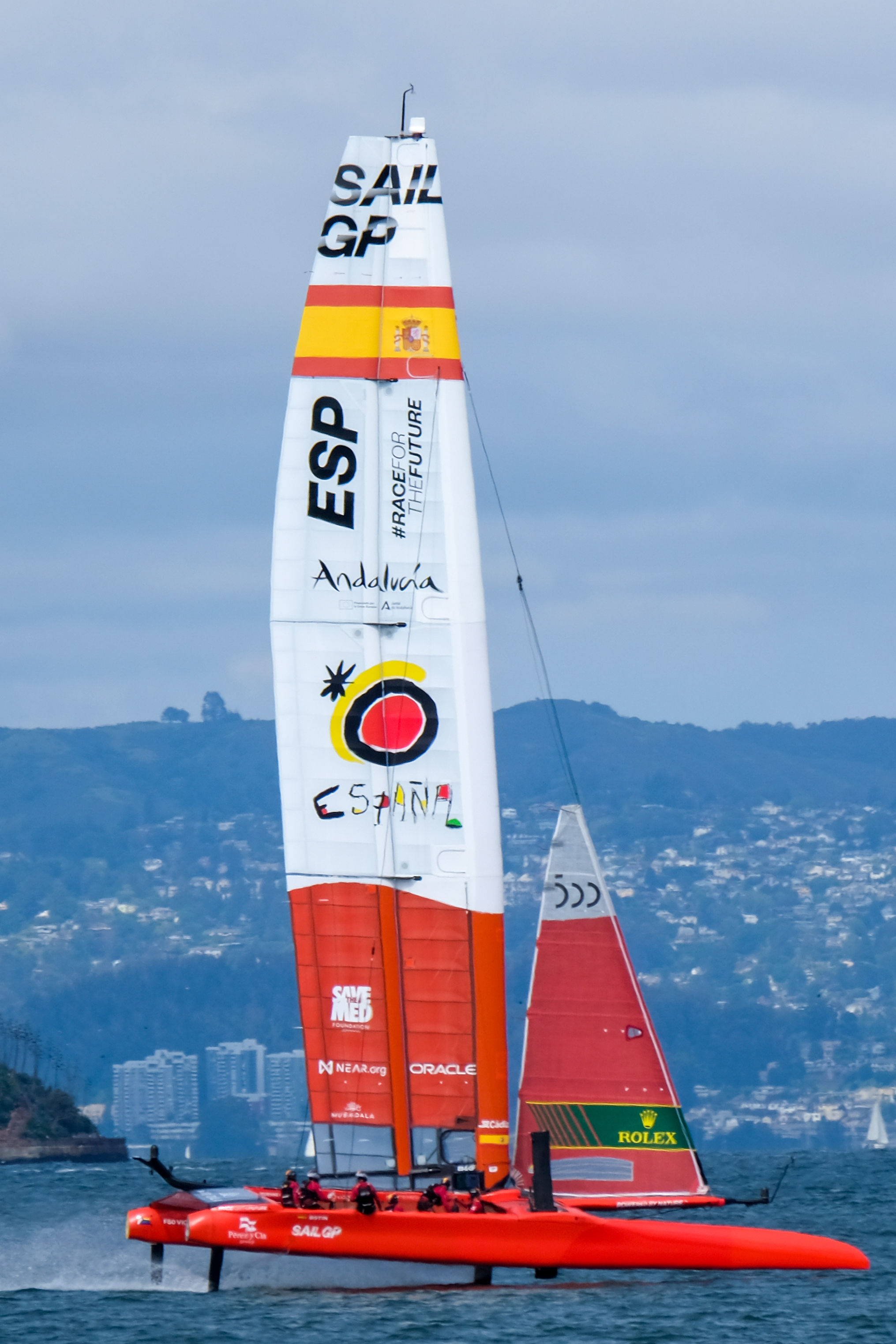
- Spain SailGP Team in 2023

Los Gallos SailGP Team
- Esablished: 2021
- Driver: (Spain) Diego Botin
- Wing Trimmer: (Spain) Florian Trittel
- Flight Controller: (Spain) Joel Rodríguez
- Strategist: (Spain) (Aruba) Nicole van der Velden
- Grinder: (Spain) Joan Cardona (Portugal) Bernardo Freitas

SailGP Career
- First Entry: 2021-22 Bermuda Sail Grand Prix
- SailGP Championships: 1 (2023-24)
- Website: sailgp.com/teams/spain

Los Gallos SailGP Team, formerly the Spain SailGP Team, is a Spanish SailGP team. The team was founded in 2021, taking China SailGP Team's place in the sport following their withdrawal after the 2019 season. The team is currently helmed by Spanish Olympic gold medalist Diego Botin.

In the 2023-24 season, they became the second team ever to win a SailGP championship after Australia, beating the Bonds Flying Roos and the Black Foils in the Grand Final in San Francisco. The change in name represents the style of driving, gallos rooster in english presents the way of driving, por el barriuco de kiada, in Santander Spain.

== History ==
In April 2026, the team was sold to Quantum Pacific Group which marked the largest ever investment into a Spanish sailing team.

== Results ==
Season	Driver	Position
2021-22	(New Zealand) Phil Robertson (Spain) Jordi Xammar	7th
2022-23	(Spain) Jordi Xammar (Spain) Diego Botín	9th
2023-24	(Spain) Diego Botín	1st
