= 2021–22 SailGP championship =

Second season of the SailGP championship

2021–22 SailGP Championship
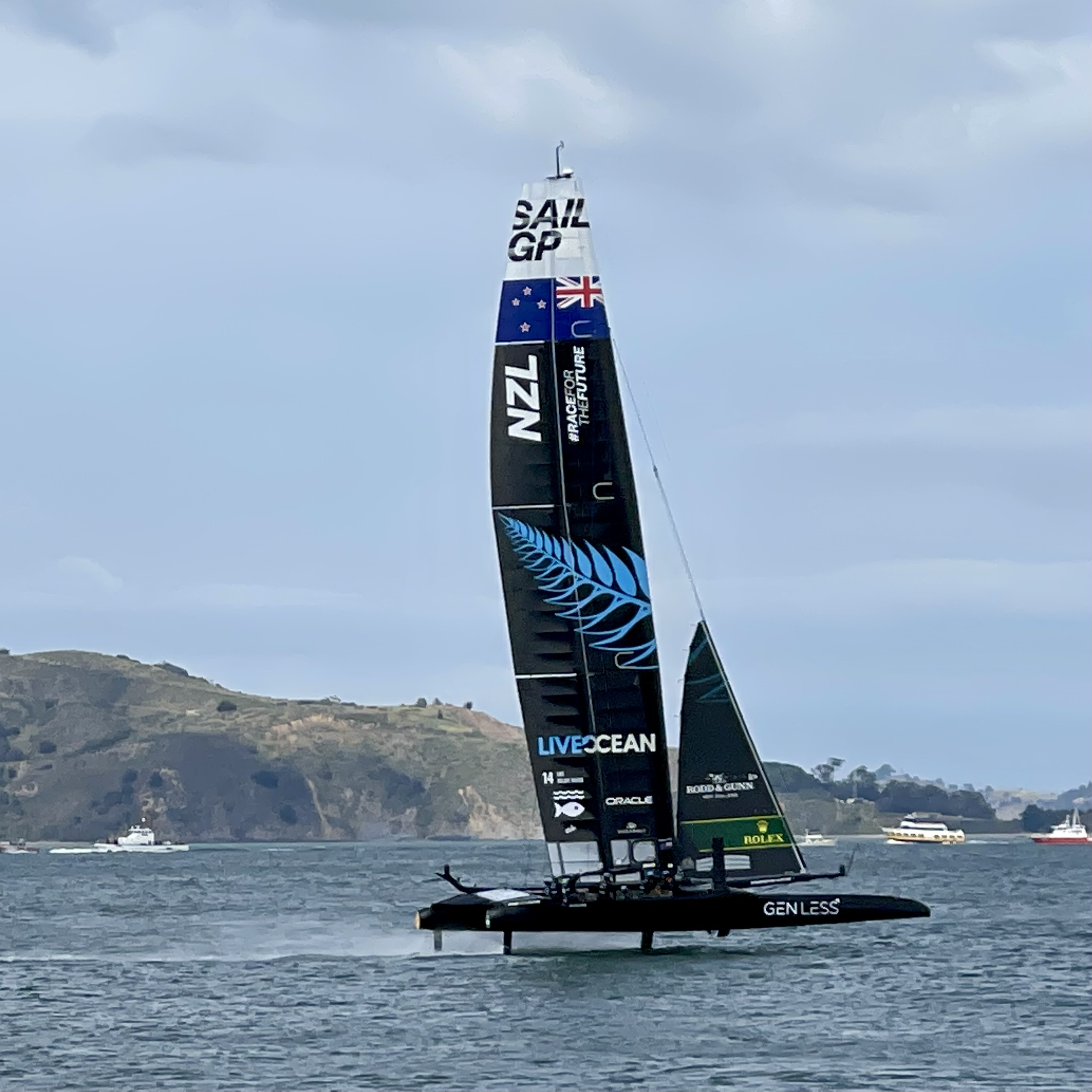
- New Zealand SailGP Team competing in the United States Grand Prix in March 2022 on San Francisco Bay.

Event title
- Name: 2021–22 SailGP Championship
- Dates: April 23, 2021 (Note: The Bermuda Sail Grand Prix was originally scheduled for 24–25 April, but the first day of racing was moved to 23 April after poor racing winds were forecast on 24 April. The broadcast went ahead on 24 April as planned.) to March 27, 2022
- Yachts: F50

Results
- Winner: Australia (2nd title)
- Impact League: New Zealand

The 2021–22 SailGP Championship was the second season of the SailGP championship. Originally due to be contested in 2020, the season was postponed to 2021 after the first round in Sydney due to the ongoing COVID-19 pandemic and was then extended into the early months of 2022.

The championship was again won by the Australian team. New Zealand was the inaugural winner of the Impact League.

== Entries ==
Team	Helmsman	Rounds
Australia SailGP Team	(Australia) Tom Slingsby	1–8
Denmark SailGP Team presented by Rockwool	(Denmark) Nicolai Sehested	1–8
France SailGP Team	(France) Billy Besson	1–5
France SailGP Team	(France) Quentin Delapierre	6–8
(United Kingdom) Great Britain SailGP Team presented by INEOS (Note: INEOS was the presenting partner of the British SailGP team for the annulled Sydney round, but they did not continue to sponsor the team when the season resumed.); (United Kingdom) Great Britain SailGP Team	(United Kingdom) Ben Ainslie	1, 4–8
(United Kingdom) Great Britain SailGP Team presented by INEOS; (United Kingdom) Great Britain SailGP Team	(United Kingdom) Paul Goodison	2–3
Japan SailGP Team	(Australia) Nathan Outteridge	1–8
New Zealand SailGP Team	(New Zealand) Peter Burling	1, 4–8
New Zealand SailGP Team	(Switzerland) Arnaud Psarofaghis	2–3
Spain SailGP Team	(New Zealand) Phil Robertson	1–7
Spain SailGP Team	(Spain) Jordi Xammar	8
United States SailGP Team	(United States) Rome Kirby	None (Note: Kirby was the original helmsman of the US team and competed in that role for the opening round in Sydney. He was replaced prior to the new opening round in Bermuda and instead competed as flight controller.)
United States SailGP Team	(Australia) Jimmy Spithill	1–8
Citations:

=== Team changes ===
After only one season, China left the championship. Denmark and Spain joined the championship in Sydney, while New Zealand entered in Bermuda.

== Calendar ==
Rnd	Host	Title	Dates	Winning team
HC	Sydney, Australia	Sydney Sail Grand Prix	February 28–29, 2020	(United Kingdom) Great Britain
1	Bermuda	Bermuda Sail Grand Prix presented by Hamilton Princess	April 23–25, 2021	(United Kingdom) Great Britain
– (Note: New York originally appeared on the 2020 schedule and the revised 2021 schedule, but was removed from the 2021–22 schedule.)	(United States) New York City, USA	New York Sail Grand Prix	June 4–5, 2021	Removed
2	Taranto, Italy	Italy Sail Grand Prix | Taranto	June 5–6, 2021	Japan
3	(United Kingdom) Plymouth, England (Note: The Great Britain Sail Grand Prix was originally scheduled to be held in Cowes, Isle of Wight.)	Great Britain Sail Grand Prix | Plymouth	July 17–18, 2021	Australia
4	Aarhus, Denmark (Note: The Denmark Sail Grand Prix was originally scheduled to be held in Copenhagen.)	Rockwool Denmark Sail Grand Prix | Aarhus	August 20–21, 2021	Australia
5	Saint-Tropez, France	France Sail Grand Prix | Saint-Tropez	September 11–12, 2021	Japan
6	Cádiz, Spain	Spain Sail Grand Prix | Andalucía - Cádiz	October 9–10, 2021	Australia
7	Sydney, Australia	Australia Sail Grand Prix | Sydney presented by KPMG	December 17–18, 2021	Australia
– (Note: New Zealand was removed from the schedule after SailGP were denied permission to enter the country.)	Christchurch, New Zealand	New Zealand Sail Grand Prix	January 29–30, 2022	Removed
8	(United States) San Francisco, USA	Mubadala United States Sail Grand Prix | San Francisco	March 26–27, 2022	Australia
Citations:

Although the opening round in Sydney proceeded as planned, results from the race were declared void upon the postponement of the season until 2021. Nine races were expected in the expanded calendar, and eight were announced before the addition of a new Sydney round. The New Zealand event was removed after organisers were denied permission to enter the country.

== Season ==
=== Sydney ===
The season originally began in Sydney with new teams Spain and Denmark joining, with the former coming second in several fleet races. The British team dominated the opening round ahead of 2019 champions Australia and led the standings 47 to 42 points, with Japan in third on 39 points. Both Spain and Denmark received penalties, Spain for contact with the French boat and Denmark for a rule infringement. However, the eventual postponement of the season to 2021–22 reset the standings.

==== Results ====
Pos	Team	(Australia) SYD (Note: Although the first round in Sydney was successfully completed before the delay of the rest of the season, points scored were later removed from the championship.)						Points
Pos	Team	1	2	3	4	5	F	Points
1	(United Kingdom) Great Britain	1	1	1	1	4	1	47
2	Australia	2	3	5	2	1	2	42
3	Japan	3	4	3	3	3		39
4	Spain	5	2	2	4	2		31
5	United States	4	6	4	5	5		31
6	Denmark	7	5	6	7	6		22
7	France	6	DNS	DNS	6	7		14
Citation:

Key
Colour	Result
1	Winner
2	Second place
3	Third place
4–7	Finish
DNF	Did not finish
DNS	Did not start
DSQ	Disqualified
WH	Withheld from racing
C	Race cancelled

=== Round 1: Bermuda ===
New Zealand joined the resumed season in Bermuda, where the first day of racing was brought forward to the Friday to avoid poor conditions on Saturday. The Australian team won the first three races, with Britain finishing farther back in the field in the first two races while being penalised in the first race for cutting off the US team. Japan heavily collided with the US in the fourth race which the British team ultimately won, while the Australians won the fifth. Neither the US nor Japan finished race four and neither started race five. This meant that Australia, Great Britain and France progressed to the final, which Britain won.

=== Round 2: Taranto ===
The Italian SailGP saw the introduction of harsher penalties for teams involved in collisions after the incident involving the US and Japanese teams in Bermuda. The Australian team suffered hydraulic failure in the first race and retired. The US team won the first and third fleet races with Japan winning the second. On the second day, New Zealand won the fourth fleet race while Japan won the fifth fleet race. The US, Japan, and Spain qualified for the final, which Japan won. This was the first SailGP final the Australian team did not qualify for. During the final, the US suffered an impact with a submerged object in the water which damaged their rudder, causing it to break down.

=== Round 3: Plymouth ===
Most teams competed with substitute sailors at the Plymouth regatta due to 2020 Summer Olympics commitments. The first two races were won by the Australian team. In the third race, the US team narrowly avoided a collision with the Spanish boat at the race start. Spain was disqualified for the manoeuvre, the first time any competitor had been disqualified in the championship. The US went on to win the third race. Japan won the fourth fleet race and Great Britain the fifth, leaving France, the US, and Australia to compete in the final. Australia won the event, moving them to first place in the championship, drawn on points with Great Britain.

=== Round 4: Aarhus ===
Spain capsized their F50 before the first fleet race and sustained significant damage to the boat's foil. As a result, they did not compete in the first day's races. Denmark won the first fleet race, taking their first victory in the series at their home event. The second fleet race was won by the US team, and the third by the UK. Japan won the fourth and fifth, and were joined by Australia and the UK for the final. Australia won the final race, their second victory of the season.

=== Round 5: Saint-Tropez ===
Great Britain won the first fleet race for the French round, with the US winning the next two. Championship leader Australia suffered hydraulic and electrical failures and consistently finished in the last few positions. Japan won the fourth race and Denmark the fifth, with the former also winning the final to take the championship lead.

=== Round 6: Cádiz ===
The first fleet race was won by Great Britain, with Spain winning on home waters in the second race. The US won the final race of day one. Before the beginning of the second day's racing, the Spanish capsized and caused substantial damage to the F50's wing. Spain was unable to start any of the remaining races, which were won by New Zealand and Australia, with Australia, Great Britain, and the US making the final. Great Britain capsized in the final, allowing Australia to take the win. For the first time of the season, female competitors joined each boat as part of the Female Halfway program.

=== Round 8: San Francisco ===
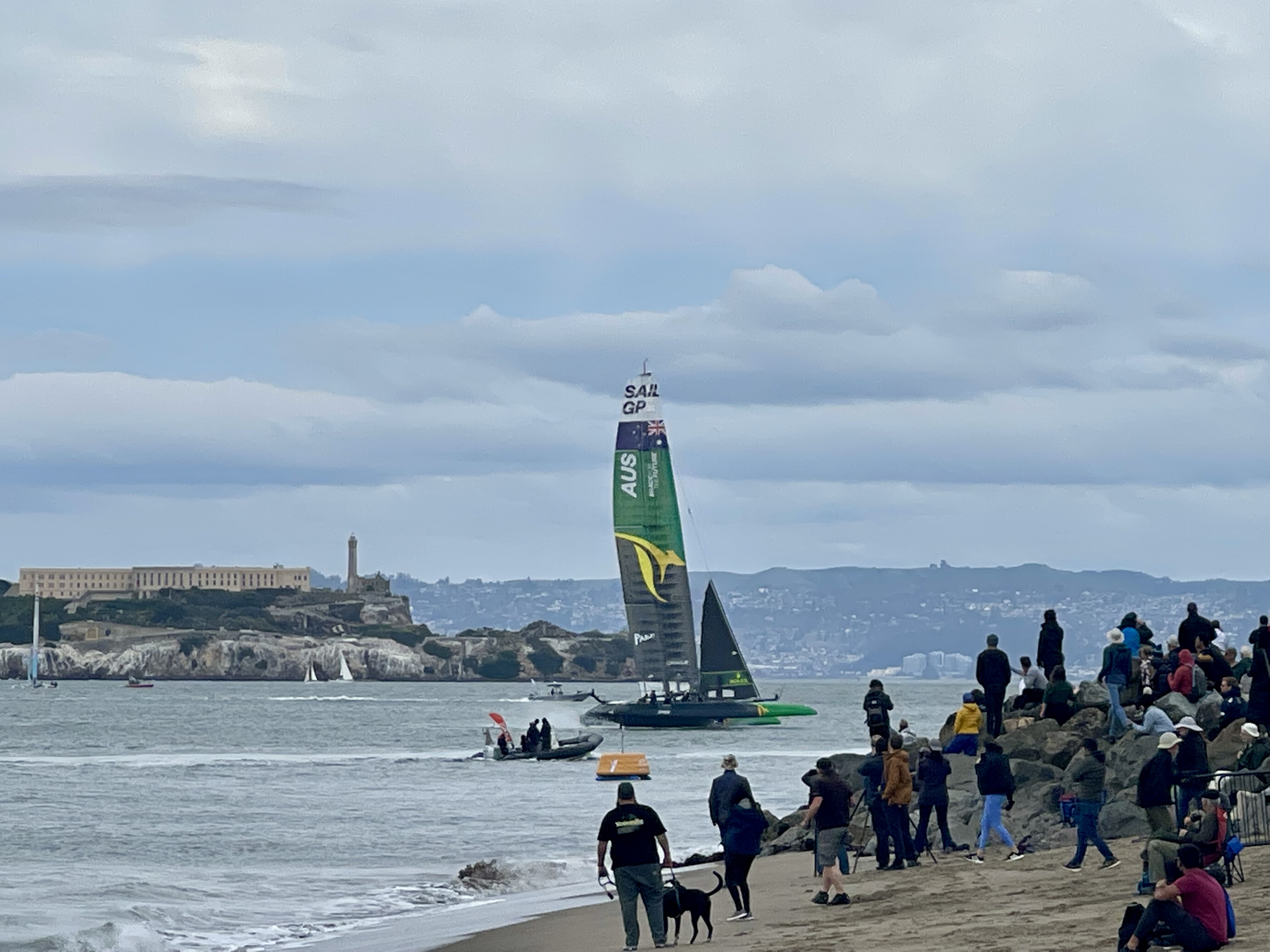
The Australian team won the Grand Final in San Francisco.

== Results ==
Points were awarded per race for the round leaderboard, with 8 points for the winner, 7 points for second place, 6 points for third, and so on.

Each event hosted multiple races, with the three highest scoring teams after each round facing off to decide the podium order. (Note: Up until the 2020 Sydney Sail Grand Prix, the final race of each round included only the two top-scoring teams.) The winner of that final race won the event, with the final standings of the event leaderboard used to award points for the championship standings, with the winner awarded 10 points, second awarded 9, and so on. The three highest scoring teams at the end of the season competed one-on-one with the winning team awarded the championship.

Pos	Team	(Bermuda) BMU						(Italy) TRN						(United Kingdom) PLY						(Denmark) AAR						(France) STP						(Spain) CDZ						(Australia) SYD						(United States) SFN						Points
Pos	Team	1	2	3	4	5	F	1	2	3	4	5	F	1	2	3	4	5	F	1	2	3	4	5	F	1	2	3	4	5	F	1	2	3	4	5	F	1	2	3	4	5	F	1	2	3	4	5	GF	Points
1	Australia	1	1	1	2	1	2	DNF	6	8	5	2		1	1	7	7	4	1	2	2	5	2	7	1	8	6	6	8	6		2	4	2	4	1	1	3	7	1	4	2	1	2	4	3	2	1	1	65
2	Japan	3	2	5	DNF	DNS		2	1	3	3	1	1	5	8	5	1	7		5	3	6	1	1	2	2	2	7	1	7	1	4	2	5	6	3		7	1	DNF	1	1		6	2	1	6	4	2	59 (60)
3	United States	4	6	3	DNF	DNS		1	4	1	2	8	3	2	5	1	4	6	3	7	1	3	5	5		5	1	1	7	4	2	3	5	1	3	5	2	6	3	2	3	4	2	5	7	5	5	DNF	3	58
4	(United Kingdom) Great Britain	7	7	2	1	2	1	6	3	7	6	4		8	7	2	3	1		4	5	1	4	2	3	1	5	8	3	5		1	7	4	2	2	DNF	2	4	DNF	WH	WH		1	6	4	3	2		50 (54)
5	New Zealand	6	8	8	4	5		3	8	5	1	7		6	6	4	2	8		3	6	2	8	3		4	3	3	2	8		5	6	8	1	6		5	8	5	2	3		3	5	8	1	3		47 (48)
6	Denmark	8	5	7	6	6		7	5	6	4	3		7	2	6	5	3		1	4	7	6	8		6	7	2	5	1		6	3	3	5	7		4	5	4	7	5		4	1	6	7	5		45
7	Spain	5	3	6	3	3		4	2	4	7	5	2	4	4	DSQ	5	5		DNS	DNS	DNS	3	4		3	4	4	6	2	3	7	1	6	DNS	DNS		1	2	3	6	6	3	8	3	2	8	DNF		42 (44)
8	France	2	4	4	5	4	3	5	7	2	8	6		3	3	3	8	2	2	6	7	4	7	6		7	8	5	4	3		8	8	7	7	4		8	6	6	5	7		7	8	7	4	6		39 (40)
Citations:

Key
Colour	Result
1	Winner
2	Second place
3	Third place
4–8	Finish
DNF	Did not finish
DNS	Did not start
DSQ	Disqualified
WH	Withheld from racing
C	Race cancelled

Notes

- Great Britain was penalised four points in the championship.
- Spain was penalised two points in the championship.
- France was penalised one point in the championship.
- Japan was penalised one point in the championship.
- New Zealand was penalised one point in the championship.

== Impact League ==
As part of SailGP's sustainability initiatives, the championship introduced a second leaderboard on which teams compete to have the greatest improvement in the sustainability of the sport. Teams are externally audited after each round against 10 criteria, with the top three ranked teams awarded prize money to be donated to the teams' sustainability partners.

=== Standings ===
Pos	Team	(Bermuda) BMU	(Italy) TRN	(United Kingdom) PLY	(Denmark) AAR	(France) STP	(Spain) CDZ	(Australia) SYD	(United States) SFN	Points
1	New Zealand	89	133	163	165	177	168	172	180	1246
2	(United Kingdom) Great Britain	54	134	157	176	165	161	166	177	1192
3	Australia	60	118	153	160	164	174	168	164	1161
4	Spain	82	99	144	145	149	156	147	176	1094
5	France	70	101	141	164	150	120	169	166	1081
6	Japan	26	81	152	140	156	169	158	166	1048
7	United States	38	116	143	141	142	133	148	163	1024
8	Denmark	75	119	119	102	125	144	139	145	967
Citation:

== Inspire Racing ==
SailGP, in partnership with Waszp, created Inspire Racing to make foiling more accessible to young sailors, give them opportunity to experience a large sailing competition in all aspects, including racing in front of huge SailGP crowds.

Location	Winners	Runner-up	3rd place
(Italy) Taranto	(Italy) Zero Valerio Marchesini	(Malta) Richard Schultheis	(Italy) Mattia Cesana
(United Kingdom) Plymouth	(United Kingdom) Zak Blomeley	(United Kingdom) Matt Beck	(United Kingdom) Fin Armstrong
(Denmark) Aarhus	(Denmark) Lennart Frohmann	(Denmark) Magnus Frohmann	(Denmark) Malthe Ebdrup
(France) Saint-Tropez	(Netherlands) Eliott Savelon	(Republic of Ireland) Charlie Cullen	(France) Eliott Coville
(Spain) Cádiz	(Spain) Jaime Framis Harguindey	(Spain) Quique Urios Salinas	(Spain) Dani Cabré Burniol
(Australia) Sydney	(Australia) Jack Ferguson	(Australia) Keizo Tomishima	(Australia) Hugo Allison
(United States) San Francisco - Final	(New Zealand) Sean Herbert (United Kingdom) Hattie Rogers	(Spain) Jaime Framis Harguindey (Norway) Mathilde Robertstad	(Netherlands) Eliott Savelon (United States) Pearl Lattanzi
Citations:
