= 2023–24 SailGP championship =

4th season of SailGP sailing competition

2023–24 SailGP Championship
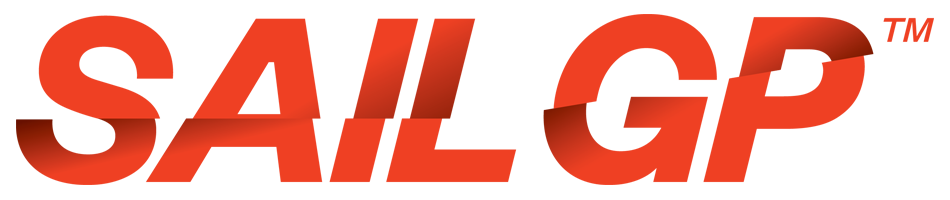

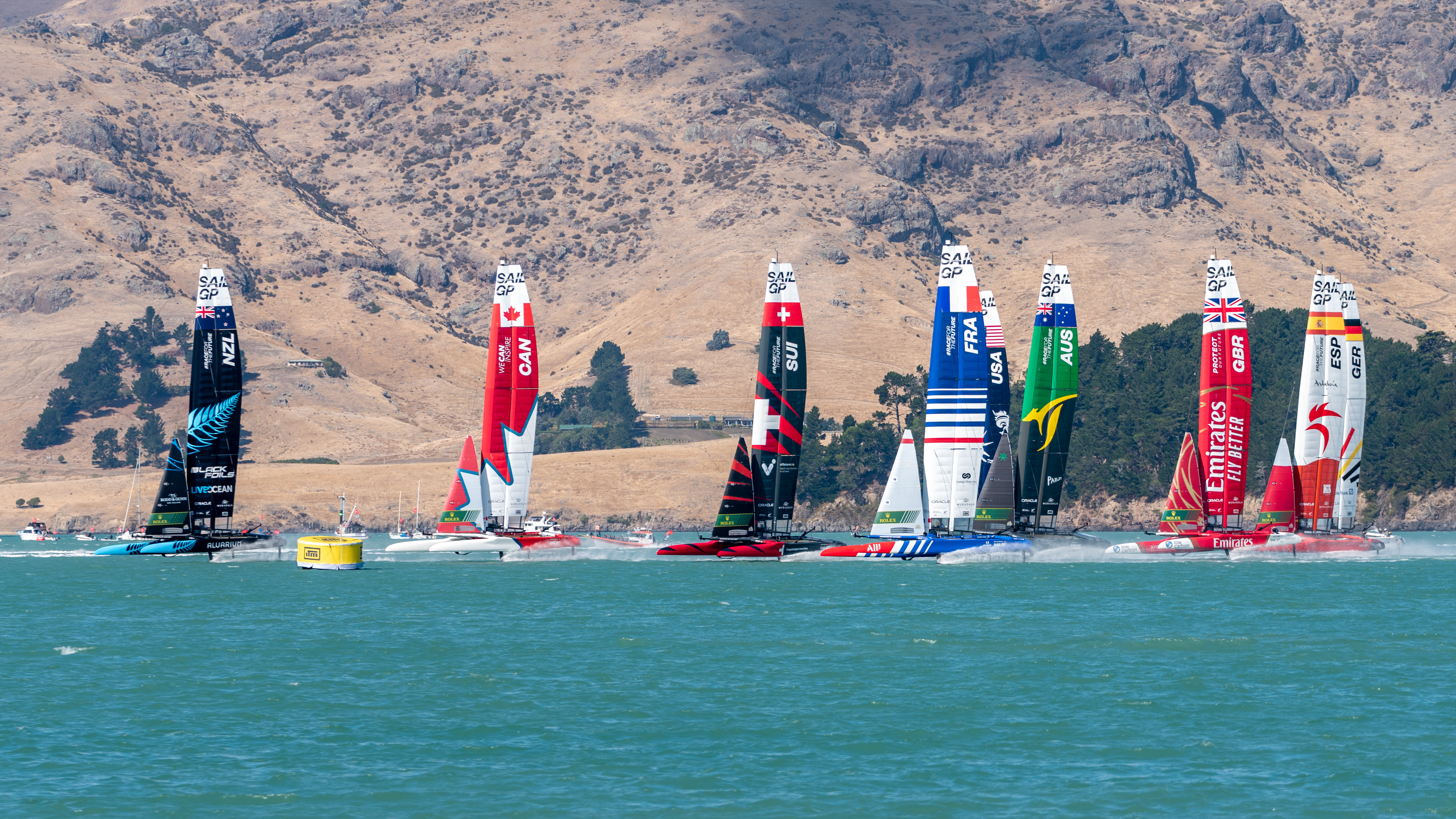

Event title
- Name: 2023–24 SailGP Championship
- Dates: June 16, 2023 to July 14, 2024
- Yachts: F50

Results
- Winner: Spain (1st title)
- Impact League: (United Kingdom) Great Britain

The 2023–24 SailGP Championship was the fourth season of the SailGP championship. The season was contested over thirteen sail grands prix held at venues around the world. The season saw Spain SailGP Team win their first season title, with Great Britain SailGP Team winning the impact league. This marked the first season title not won by Australia SailGP Team.

== Entries ==
Team	Helmsman	Events
Australia SailGP Team	(Australia) Tom Slingsby	1–5, 7–13
Australia SailGP Team	(Australia) Jimmy Spithill	6
Canada SailGP Team	(New Zealand) Phil Robertson	1–13
Rockwool Denmark SailGP Team	(Denmark) Nicolai Sehested	1–6, 8–13
Rockwool Denmark SailGP Team	(Australia) Nathan Outteridge	7
France SailGP Team	(France) Quentin Delapierre	1–13
Germany SailGP Team	(Germany) Erik Heil	1–13
(United Kingdom) Emirates Great Britain SailGP team	(United Kingdom) Ben Ainslie	1–6
(United Kingdom) Emirates Great Britain SailGP team	(United Kingdom) Giles Scott	7–13
New Zealand SailGP Team	(New Zealand) Peter Burling	1–3, 5–7, 9–13
New Zealand SailGP Team	(Australia) Nathan Outteridge	8
Spain SailGP Team	(Spain) Diego Botín	1–13
Switzerland SailGP Team	(Switzerland) Sébastien Schneiter	1–8
Switzerland SailGP Team	(Australia) Nathan Outteridge	9–13
United States SailGP Team	(Australia) Jimmy Spithill	1–5
United States SailGP Team	(United States) Taylor Canfield	6–9, 11–13
Citations:

=== Team changes ===
Bernoulli | Locke planned to enter the championship as a fan-run team covering the geographical area of Bermuda and the Caribbean. The team failed to gain the necessary funding in time for the fourth season, and pushed their entry goal to the fifth season in 2024.

On May 31, 2023, the creation of the SailGP Germany Team was announced and added to the fourth season roster.

== Calendar ==
An additional round was added to this season. The New Zealand round was originally scheduled to be held in Auckland but was cancelled, and later moved to Christchurch.

Rnd	Host	Title	Dates	Winning team
1	Chicago, United States	Rolex United States Sail Grand Prix | Chicago at Navy Pier	June 16–17, 2023	New Zealand
2	Los Angeles, United States	Oracle Los Angeles Sail Grand Prix | Port of Los Angeles	July 22–23, 2023	Spain
3	Saint-Tropez, France	France Sail Grand Prix | Saint-Tropez	September 9–10, 2023	(United Kingdom) Emirates Great Britain
4	Taranto, Italy	Rockwool Italy Sail Grand Prix | Taranto	September 23–24, 2023	(United Kingdom) Emirates Great Britain (Note: Due to low winds, no team finished the final race within the time limit. The win was awarded to Emirates Great Britain.)
5	Cádiz, Spain	Spain Sail Grand Prix | Andalucía – Cádiz	October 14–15, 2023	United States
6	Dubai, United Arab Emirates	Emirates Dubai Sail Grand Prix presented by P&O Marinas	December 9–10, 2023	New Zealand
7	Abu Dhabi, United Arab Emirates	Mubadala Abu Dhabi Sail Grand Prix presented by Abu Dhabi Sports Council	January 13–14, 2024	New Zealand
8	Sydney, Australia	KPMG Australia Sail Grand Prix | Sydney	February 24–25, 2024	Australia
– (Note: The New Zealand round was originally meant to rotate between Auckland and Christchurch, with Auckland hosting the round for the 2023–24 season. However, due to issues with the Auckland venue, the round was moved to Christchurch.)	Auckland, New Zealand	ITM New Zealand Sail Grand Prix | Auckland	March 23–24, 2024	Removed
9	Christchurch, New Zealand	ITM New Zealand Sail Grand Prix | Christchurch	March 23–24, 2024	New Zealand
10	Bermuda	Apex Group Bermuda Sail Grand Prix	May 4–5, 2024	Spain
11	Halifax, Canada	Rockwool Canada Sail Grand Prix | Halifax	June 1–2, 2024	(United Kingdom) Emirates Great Britain
12	New York City, United States	Mubadala New York Sail Grand Prix	June 22–23, 2024	New Zealand
13	San Francisco, United States	SailGP Season 4 Grand Final | San Francisco	July 13–14, 2024	Australia (event winners)
Citations:

== Season ==
=== Round 1: Chicago ===
The New Zealand team won the Chicago event, with Australia 2nd and Canada 3rd.

=== Round 2: Los Angeles ===
The Spanish team won the Los Angeles event, with Denmark 2nd and Australia 3rd.

Germany were penalised for clipping the rear of the Switzerland boat at the start of the 4th fleet race. They received a 4-point penalty in the event ranking, and a 2-point penalty in the season ranking.

=== Round 3: Saint-Tropez ===
Sebastian Vettel participated in practice for the regatta with the German team, which he co-owns. The United States team capsized in practice, but avoided damaging their F50.

Wind for the first day of racing were mainly light, preventing the boats from foiling. Spain and Canada collided during the first race, with the latter receiving a penalty. Moments after the finishing the final race of the day, New Zealand's wing collapsed, leaving doubts as to whether they would be able to participate in the second day of racing.

=== Round 4: Taranto ===
New Zealand was unable to participate in the regatta due to a shortage of spare parts preventing their F50 from being repaired and were awarded six championship points. Emirates GBR, Australia and the United States teams qualified for the event final but all three were unable to finish the race due to winds dropping to just 7km/h and exceeding the 16 minute race time limit resulting in a win for Emirates GBR based on fleet racing results for the whole event.

=== Round 7: Abu Dhabi ===
Both days of racing in Abu Dhabi were characterized by light wind. The boats used the largest 28m wingsail configurations, but foiling was not seen in any of the races as teams tried for "H1" at best. The three boat final on Sunday saw New Zealand again win with Spain and the new USA team battling into 2nd and 3rd place respectively.

=== Round 8: Sydney ===
The return of SailGP to Sydney Harbour saw both days feature stronger winds and full foiling than recent rounds. The final on Sunday saw Denmark, Australia and New Zealand racing for the title with Denmark being the only boat not to break the line at the start. After close racing, Australia won the race and their first round victory in the 2023–24 Season.

=== Round 9: Christchurch ===
The New Zealand event was originally scheduled to be held in Auckland but was cancelled, and later moved to Christchurch.

The first race day was cancelled due to dolphins on the race course after already shortening the training time. On the second race day three fleet races and the final were held. The British team started the races with a penalty resulting from a collision during training. The first round was overshadowed by a collision damaging the Danish boat, which managed to continue competing, and another damaging the Australian team boat, which had to retire. The event was won by New Zealand which took the overall championship lead by one point from Australia. Later, the umpires penalized the Australian team for colliding with the finish mark while avoiding a collision with the Canadian boat.

=== Round 10: Bermuda ===
Spain won in a brilliant victory over Australia and New Zealand. It is in this race where the Spanish team did a start in the "Fernando Alonso's style".

The United States team did not compete in Bermuda after sustaining serious damage to their F50 in practice racing.

=== Round 11: Halifax ===
The second day of racing was affected by strong winds. Due to the winds the boats of Switzerland, USA and Germany were not ready to be launched and were not able to participate in the first round of racing of that day with the latter being able to join in the second round. The boats were launched in the order of the results of the first day. Australia capsized in the fifth round due to a malfunctioning invert button for the wingsail.

=== Round 12: New York ===
The racing on the first day was heavily affected by thunderstorms leading to light winds. The second round was cut short and the third round was cancelled shortly after the start due to light winds.

=== Round 13: Grand Final | San Francisco ===
Canada hit a race marker in race two, whilst France sustained foil damage after a collision with Denmark in race four which prevented France from competing in race five. After five fleet races Australia were the San Francisco event winners and the top three season point earning teams (New Zealand, Australia, and Spain) progressed to the Grand Final race. Spain won the start and was first to round mark 1, leading the entire race despite encountering rudder damage on the final leg before the finish line. New Zealand finished third, Australia second, and Spain were crowned champions of the season.

== Results ==
Points are awarded per race for the Event Leaderboard, with 10 points for the winner, 9 points for second place, 8 points for third, and so on.

Each event hosts multiple races, with the three highest scoring teams of the event facing off in an additional final race to decide the podium order. The winner of that final wins the event, with the final standings of the event leaderboard used to award points for the Championship Leaderboard. The winner is awarded 10 Championship points, second awarded 9, and so on.

The three highest scoring teams at the end of the season compete in the SailGP Grand Final with the winning team awarded the championship.

Pos	Team	(United States) CHI						(United States) LOS						(France) STP						(Italy) TRN						(Spain) CDZ						(United Arab Emirates) DUB						(United Arab Emirates) ABD						(Australia) SYD						(New Zealand) CHR (Note: The first day of racing in Christchurch was cancelled due to marine life in the race area.)				(Bermuda) BMU						(Canada) HAL						(United States) NYC					(United States) SFN						Points
Pos	Team	1	2	3	4	5	F	1	2	3	4	5	F	1	2	3	4	5	F	1	2	3	4	5	F	1	2	3	4	5	F	1	2	3	4	5	F	1	2	3	4	5	F	1	2	3	4	5	F	1	2	3	F	1	2	3	4	5	F	1	2	3	4	5	F	1	2	3	4	F	1	2	3	4	5	F	Points
1	Spain	6	9	4	1	7		6	3	2	1	9	1	8	4	7	2	2	3	8	8	7	2	3		1	6	3	4	10		10	8	2	DNS	9		10	1	1	10	1	2	4	1	8	7	6		3	2	4		7	6	1	3	4	1	1	4	8	7	1		7	4	6	7		7	7	5	6	4	1	81
2	Australia	1	5	1	4	5	2	1	2	4	2	1	3	5	1	8	5	1	2	1	1	5	5	7	DNF	5	2	1	6	2	3	3	1	3	4	8	2	2	9	6	1	9		1	2	4	5	8	1	DNF	DNS	DNS		1	1	3	8	2	3	8	6	1	6	DNF		3	6	9	1		5	1	8	1	1	2	88
3	New Zealand	4	2	2	3	6	1	4	5	10	7	6		1	6	5	DNS	DNS								4	5	8	2	5		6	2	4	2	4	1	1	10	2	6	6	1	3	5	1	2	7	3	1	4	2	1	3	4	4	6	1	2	5	2	4	5	5		5	3	4	2	1	4	4	4	3	7	3	100
4	Rockwool Denmark	5	4	3	10	4		3	1	5	4	3	2	3	7	2	4	6		6	3	1	9	9		3	4	2	1	1	2	4	5	10	3	5		5	4	8	8	8		2	3	2	4	4	2	8	8	6		6	3	2	4	8		6	1	5	4	4	3	2	8	5	10		2	8	1	4	2		76
5	(United Kingdom) Emirates Great Britain	2	7	8	6	10		2	6	1	9	8		2	8	3	1	3	1	2	2	3	1	2	DNF	8	10	6	7	6		5	7	1	1	DSQ		7	7	7	5	4		9	6	7	6	5		4	3	8		8	5	5	7	7		3	5	2	3	2	1	1	7	2	5	3	6	2	2	5	5		74
6	Canada	3	1	5	5	2	3	5	7	3	3	4		10	5	9	3	8		5	5	4	6	4		7	7	5	5	3		1	3	8	7	1	3	3	6	5	7	5		10	10	10	8	2		5	1	3	3	2	2	6	2	9		7	3	3	1	7		4	2	1	4	2	3	5	6	2	3		71
7	France	7	3	9	9	3		8	9	6	8	7		6	2	4	9	9		3	4	2	7	6		9	1	7	9	7		2	4	7	5	2		4	3	9	2	7		5	4	3	9	1		2	5	1	2	4	9	8	9	3		2	7	6	2	3	2	9	5	3	3		1	3	3	9	DNS		67
8	United States	9	10	6	2	8		7	4	8	5	2		9	3	1	8	7		4	6	8	3	1	DNF	2	3	10	3	4	1	8	9	9	9	3		9	2	3	4	3	3	6	9	9	10	3		9	9	9								10	10	10	WH	WH		10	10	10	9		9	10	10	7	6		52
9	Germany	8	8	7	7	9		9	8	9	10	5		7	9	6	7	4		9	DNS	DNS	4	5		6	9	9	8	8		9	DSQ	5	8	7		6	5	10	3	2		8	8	5	1	9		6	6	5		5	8	7	5	5		4	9	9	WH	6		8	9	7	8		8	9	7	8	9		38
10	Switzerland	10	6	10	8	1		10	10	7	6	10		4	10	10	6	5		7	7	6	8	8		DSQ	8	4	10	9		7	6	6	6	6		8	8	4	9	10		7	7	6	3	10		7	7	7		9	7	9	1	6		9	8	7	WH	WH		6	1	8	6		10	6	9	10	4		34
Citation:

Key
Colour	Result
1	Winner
2	Second place
3	Third place
4–10	Finish
DNF	Did not finish
DNS	Did not start
DSQ	Disqualified
WH	Withheld from racing
C	Race cancelled

Notes

- New Zealand SailGP team were awarded six points in the season championship as they were unable to compete in Rockwool Italy Sail Grand Prix | Taranto.
- Germany SailGP Team were penalised two points in the season championship for a four-point penalty at the Oracle Los Angeles Sail Grand Prix | Port of Los Angeles.
- Canada SailGP Team were penalised four points in the season championship for an eight-point penalty at the France Sail Grand Prix | Saint-Tropez.
- Spain SailGP Team were penalised two points in the season championship for a four-point penalty at the Spain Sail Grand Prix | Andalucía – Cádiz
- Switzerland SailGP Team were penalised four points in the season championship for an eight-point penalty at the Mubadala Abu Dhabi Sail Grand Prix presented by Abu Dhabi Sports Council
- Emirates Great Britain were penalised four points in the season championship for an eight-point penalty at the ITM New Zealand Sail Grand Prix | Christchurch
- Australia SailGP Team were penalised eight points in the season championship for a twelve-point penalty at the ITM New Zealand Sail Grand Prix | Christchurch
- Rockwool Denmark SailGP Team were penalised four points in the season championship for an eight-point penalty at the ITM New Zealand Sail Grand Prix | Christchurch
- Germany SailGP Team were penalised four points at the Mubadala New York Sail Grand Prix for a collision with Australia during a training session.
- Canada SailGP Team were penalised eight points at the San Francisco Grand Prix for making contact with a race marker in round two.
- France SailGP Team were penalised twelve points at the San Francisco Grand Prix for a collision with Denmark in round four.

== Impact League ==
As part of SailGP's sustainability initiatives, the championship runs a second leaderboard on which teams compete to have the greatest improvement in the sustainability of the sport. Teams are externally audited after each round against 10 criteria, with the top three ranked teams awarded prize money to be donated to the teams' sustainability partners.

=== Standings ===
Pos	Team	(United States) CHI	(United States) LOS	(France) STP	RZW	(Italy) TRN	(Spain) CDZ	(United Arab Emirates) DUB	(United Arab Emirates) ABD	ACI	(Australia) SYD	(New Zealand) CHR	(Bermuda) BMU	CRD	(Canada) HAL	(United States) NYC	PRG	SUR	WOM	Points
1	(United Kingdom) Emirates Great Britain	19	21	19	80	19	19	21	19	50	19	25	19	90	19	19	25	20	100	602
2	Rockwool Denmark	19	22	19	60	19	19	21	19	90	20	26	20	40	20	19	10	20	75	598
3	Switzerland	19	22	19	90	19	19	21	19	100	19	25	20	100	19	19	30	20	70	590
4	France	20	23	19	75	19	19	21	19	50	20	26	20	80	20	20	20	20	80	571
5	New Zealand	20	23	19	70	20	20	22	20	70	20	26	20	40	20	20	20	20	90	560
6	Australia	20	23	20	100	20	20	20	20	60	20	22	19	40	20	20	10	15	75	544
7	Germany	19	17	19	65	20	19	26	19	70	20	26	20	40	19	19	0	20	70	513
8	Canada	19	23	20	60	19	19	19	20	70	20	20	20	30	20	19	15	20	70	502
9	Spain	19	22	19	50	19	18	21	19	50	19	26	19	40	20	20	15	20	70	486
10	United States	20	23	20	60	20	19	19	19	80	18	23	20	40	20	18	0	20	40	479
Citation:

== Inspire Racing ==
SailGP, in partnership with Waszp, created Inspire Racing to make foiling more accessible to young sailors, give them opportunity to experience a large sailing competition in all aspects, including racing in front of huge SailGP crowds.

Location	Winners	Runner-up	3rd place
(United States) Chicago	(United States) Thomas Sitzmann	(Canada) Jason Macaulay	(United States) Zachary Severson
(France) Saint-Tropez	(Sweden) Hanno Seifert	(France) Matthis Johnson	(Switzerland) Micha de Weck
(Italy) Taranto	(Italy) Alessio Castellan	(Italy) Francesco De Felice	(Italy) Federico Bergamasco
(Australia) Sydney	(Australia) Louis Tilly	(Australia) Hugo Allison	(Australia) Nicholas Dunne
(New Zealand) Christchurch	(New Zealand) Noah Malpot	(New Zealand) Tim Howse	(New Zealand) Jasper Camenzind
Bermuda	(United Kingdom) Ben Anderson	(United Kingdom) Roo Purves	(United Kingdom) Tom Mitchell
(United States) San Francisco - Final	(Denmark) Magnus Overbeck (Bermuda) Rachael Betschart	(United States) Thomas Sitzmann (Norway) Pia Henriette Brun Tveita	(France) Matthis Johnson (Australia) Bridget Conrad
Citations:
