= New Zealand SailGP Team =

SailGP Team

(New Zealand) Black Foils SailGP Team
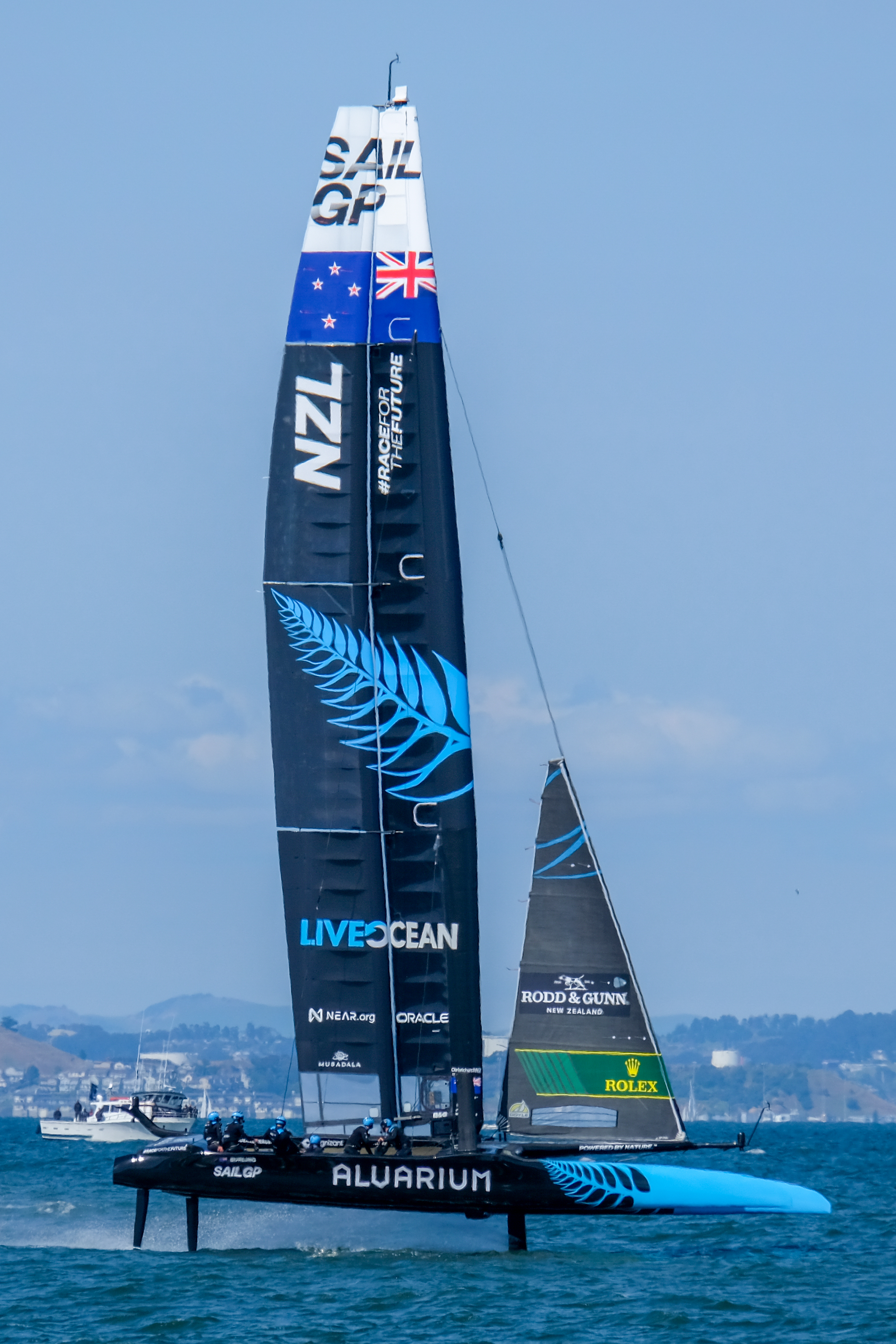

Black Foils SailGP Team
- Esablished: 2021
- Driver & Co-CEO: (New Zealand) Peter Burling
- Wing Trimmer & Co-CEO: (New Zealand) Blair Tuke
- Flight Controller: (New Zealand) (Japan) Leo Takahashi
- Strategist: (New Zealand) Liv Mackay
- Grinder: (New Zealand) Louis Sinclair (New Zealand) Marcus Hansen

SailGP Career
- First Entry: 2021-22 Bermuda Sail Grand Prix
- SailGP Championships: 0
- Website: sailgp.com/teams/new-zealand

Black Foils SailGP Team, formerly New Zealand SailGP Team, is a New Zealand professional sailing team which competes in the global Rolex SailGP championship. Established in 2020 for the second season of SailGP, the team is led by co-CEOs; driver Peter Burling, and wing trimmer Blair Tuke.

== History ==
=== Boat name (Amokura) ===
On 21 April 2021, the New Zealand SailGP Team launched their F50 boat, Amokura. Adorning the boat is a blue fern, which is a symbol of Aotearoa's identity. The blue colour scheme demonstrates the team's connection to Tangaroa and the ocean. The team's connection to the ocean is reflected in its relationship with charity partner Live Ocean. According to the team's co-CEO Burling, the design of the boat highlights the team's national identity and commitment to ocean conservation.

The name Amokura is the Māori name for a Red-tailed tropicbird. The boat was gifted to the New Zealand SailGP Team by waka expert and navigator Hoturoa Barclay-Kerr.

=== Lightning damages wing ===
In January 2023, after sailing in Singapore while being towed back to the Tech Site the New Zealand boat was struck by lightning. Lightning was spotted near the spectator race village, which was promptly evacuated, before hitting the top of the New Zealand F50 mast. The kiwi team were ashore at the time of the strike picking up their trophy. In their place, Switzerland driver Sébastien Schneiter, France strategist Manon Audinet and Denmark grinders Luke Payne and Martin Kirketerp were on board. Kirketerp, who was touching a shroud at the time, sustained an electric shock and was immediately evacuated for medical assistance. Schneiter, Audinet and Payne, who were not injured, were evacuated from the F50 and did not return until after the storm had passed. Schneiter, who was driving the F50, said: “The whole boat shut off, the wing exploded at the top and we all felt a little shock – unfortunately Martin had a bigger one.” Martin Kirketerp was transferred onto the New Zealand chase boat and taken to hospital. He underwent tests, which all came back clear, and was discharged from hospital after a night under observation. The New Zealand boat suffered a 'lot of damage', according to Tech Team director Brad Marsh, with ‘all electrical systems going down’.

=== Wing collapse ===
On 8 September 2023, after sailing on day 1 of racing in Saint-Tropez New Zealand's 29m wing collapsed. Fortunately all athletes were accounted for and no injuries were reported. Damage assessments were done overnight and the tech team reported the damage to be too significant for the team to continue racing. SailGP's spare wing was located in New Zealand and therefore the team was unable to continue racing. Speaking about the incident after racing, New Zealand driver Peter Burling said he heard 'an almighty bang' before the wing 'unraveled'. Burling said the incident happened as the F50 ‘touched down’ into the water – a maneuver the team had executed ’30–40 times today’. "We were just cruising by to say hi to a few friends at the end of the day and we just heard an almighty bang and watched it all unravel," Burling said "It just happened so quickly – we just saw the mast and sail coming down – there was nothing we could have done." Burling disagreed that the 29m wing was out of range in the wind conditions. "We’ve sailed the big wing in a little more breeze than that," he said. "For us, we felt that we were in range and sailing it pretty normally – but obviously the results are quite different from normal."

SailGP was unable to transport and fit the replacement wingsail and so New Zealand was unable to compete at Taranto. New Zealand driver and team co-CEO Peter Burling said: "It’s incredibly disappointing to be unable to race in next weekend’s event for our team, fans, partners, friends and family." Wing trimmer and co-CEO Blair Tuke said, “We’re working closely with the league to chart a path forward from here. That includes reviewing the rules for redress and compensatory points to ensure this forced non participation does not further hinder our results this season.” Tuke said, "As a group, we’re really proud of how we’ve been sailing, and how we bounced back on day one in Saint-Tropez after a difficult event in Los Angeles. It’s incredibly disappointing to not be able to build on that momentum, but we’ve faced adversity before and we will come back stronger in Cádiz, and for the rest of the season."

Investigation into the cause of the collapse found that "the mast went drastically out of alignment", according to league director Russell Coutts. Peter Burling said, "With a conventional sail, if the wind comes from the other side, it’ll flap. The wing, well it doesn’t flap, it’s rigid, though it actually creates a huge amount of pressure the other way and it buckled out to windward." "I think we have a really good understanding of exactly why the incident occurred now, but it definitely gives you a few more nerves knowing it’s had that incident before."

=== Black Foils ===
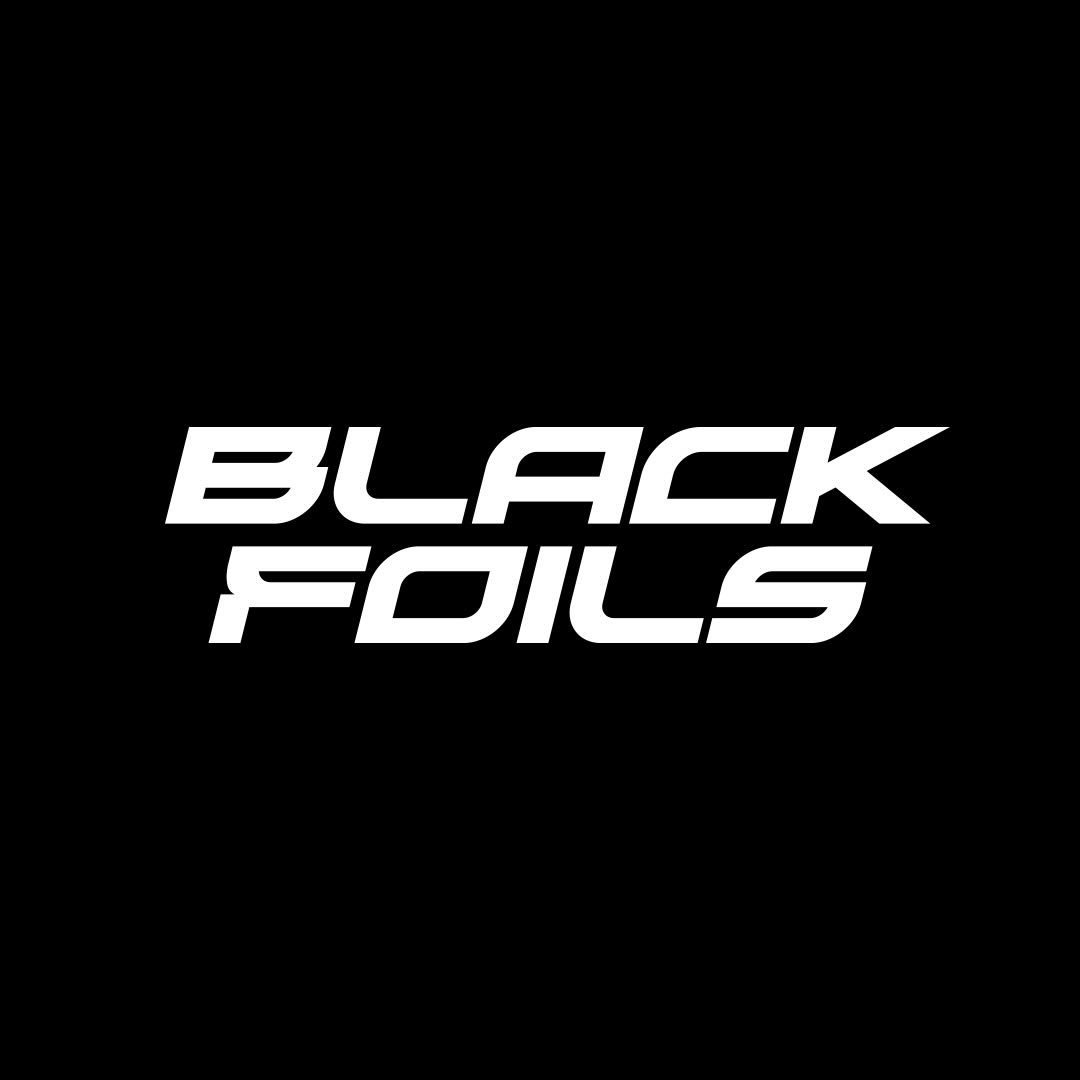
Black Foils Logo

On 12 March 2024, the New Zealand SailGP Team announced the new moniker: "Black Foils". This name is in-line with other New Zealand Sports teams. Team New Zealand wing trimmer and co-CEO Blair Tuke said: "Black Foils embodies the relentless pursuit of excellence that defines our team. New Zealand sport has a longstanding affinity with the colour black, it symbolises strength, courage, passion and resilience – values that are all integral to our team and what we stand for.” New Zealand Driver and co-CEO Peter Burling added: "The Black Foils represent the spirit of New Zealand. We’re a nation of pioneers, achievers, and ocean lovers. The foils are what allow us to fly above the water at speeds of up to 100km/hr – they represent innovation and progression in our sport.”

== Team ==
=== Current crew ===
- Peter Burling (NZL) – co-CEO & skipper
- Blair Tuke (NZL) – co-CEO & wing trimmer
- Leo Takahashi (JPN) – flight controller (since 2024)
- Liv Mackay (NZL) – strategist
- Marcus Hansen (NZL) – grinder
- Louis Sinclair (NZL) – grinder
- Jo Aleh (NZL) – strategist/spare sailor
- Finn Henry (NZL) – spare sailor
- Sam Meech (NZL) – coach (since 2024)
- Josh Junior (NZL) – former grinder (2021–2024), assistant coach (since 2024)

=== Past crew ===
- Andy Maloney (NZL) – flight controller (2021–2024)
- Arnaud Psarofaghis (SUI) – skipper for Plymouth in Season 2 when 5 athletes where representing New Zealand at the Olympic Games.
- Erica Dawson (NZL) – Strategist
- Jason Saunders (NZL) – wing trimmer for Plymouth in Season 2
- James Wierzbowski (AUS) – flight controller for Plymouth in Season 2
- Nathan Outteridge (AUS) – skipper for Sydney in Season 4, replaced Peter Burling due to parental leave.
- Ray Davies (NZL) – coach (2021–2024)

== Results ==
=== Season 2 ===
The New Zealand SailGP Team first raced in season 2 where they placed 5th.

Location	Event Result	Race 1	Race 2	Race 3	Race 4	Race 5	Final
Bermuda	5th	6th	8th	8th	4th	5th	–
(Italy) Taranto	4th	3rd	8th	5th	1st	7th	–
(United Kingdom) Plymouth	7th	6th	6th	4th	2nd	8th	–
(Denmark) Arhus	5th	3rd	6th	2nd	8th	3rd	–
(France) Saint Tropez	4th	4th	3rd	3rd	2nd	8th	–
(Spain) Cádiz	5th	5th	6th	6th	1st	6th	–
(Australia) Sydney	5th	5th	8th	5th	2nd	3rd	–
(United States) San Francisco	5th	3rd	5th	8th	1st	3rd	–
Season Result	5th						
Citations:

=== Season 3 ===
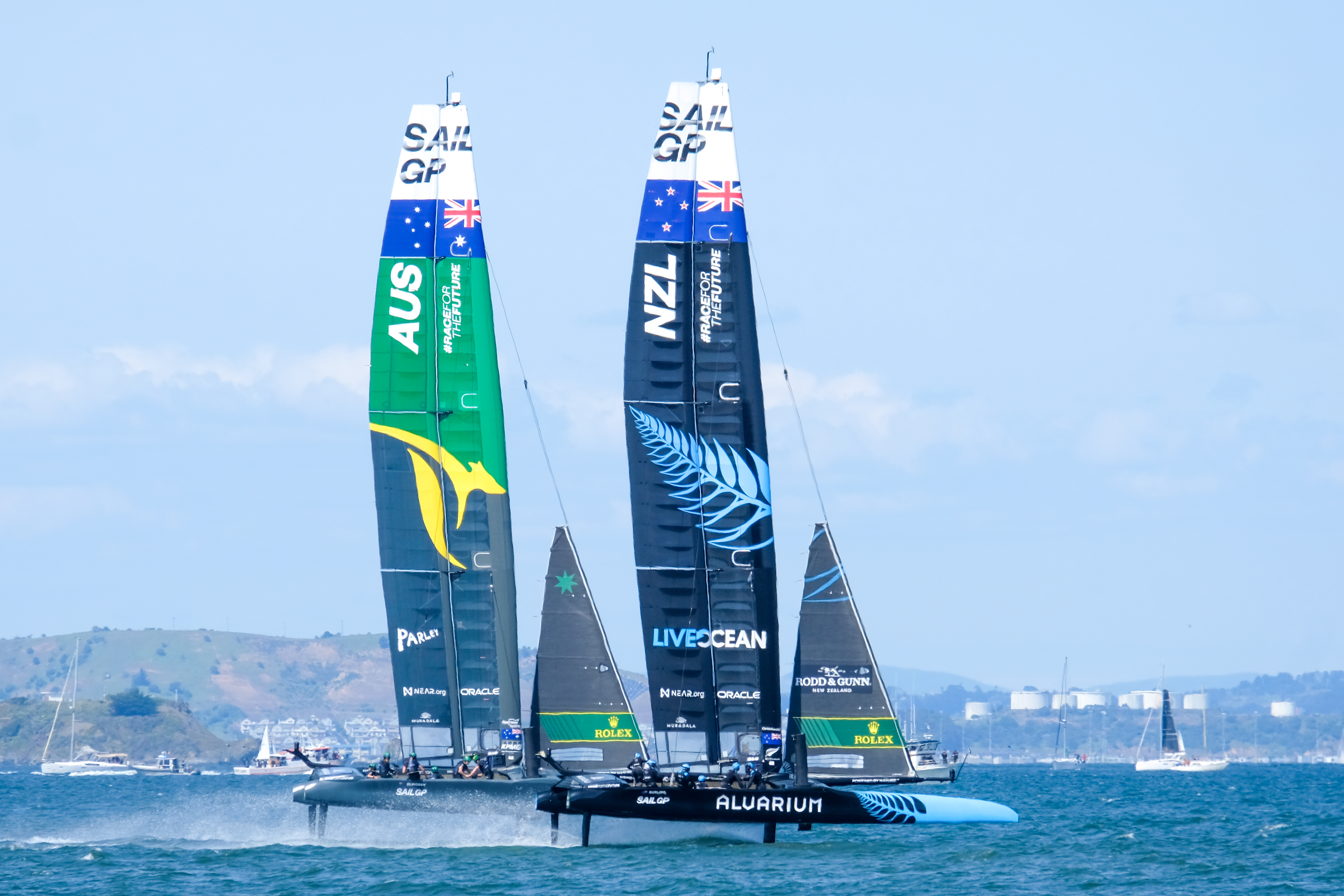
SailGP Season 3 Grand Final – San Francisco

season 3 was very successful for the team. Multiple top placings where achieved throughout the season. A close battle with the Australia SailGP Team in the final in San Francisco narrowly losing by 6 seconds.

Location	Event Result	Race 1	Race 2	Race 3	Race 4	Race 5	Race 6	Final
Bermuda	6th	7th	3rd	8th	1st	7th	–	–
(United States) Chicago	4th	1st	5th	4th	5th	8th	–	–
(United Kingdom) Plymouth	1st	2nd	2nd	1st	5th	1st	–	1st
(Denmark) Copenhagen	1st	1st	1st	1st	–	–	–	1st
(France) Saint Tropez	2nd	1st	4th	1st	2nd	–	–	2nd
(Spain) Cádiz	6th	1st	6th	5th	8th	7th	–	–
(United Arab Emirates) Dubai	4th	4th	2nd	7th	1st	6th	5th	–
Singapore	1st	1st	5th	2nd	3rd	–	–	1st
(Australia) Sydney	6th	9th	3rd	4th	–	–	–	–
(New Zealand) Christchurch	2nd	2nd	1st	2nd	2nd	3rd	–	2nd
(United States) San Francisco	6th	4th	7th	3rd	6th	7th	–	–
Season Result	2nd							
Citations:

=== Season 4 ===
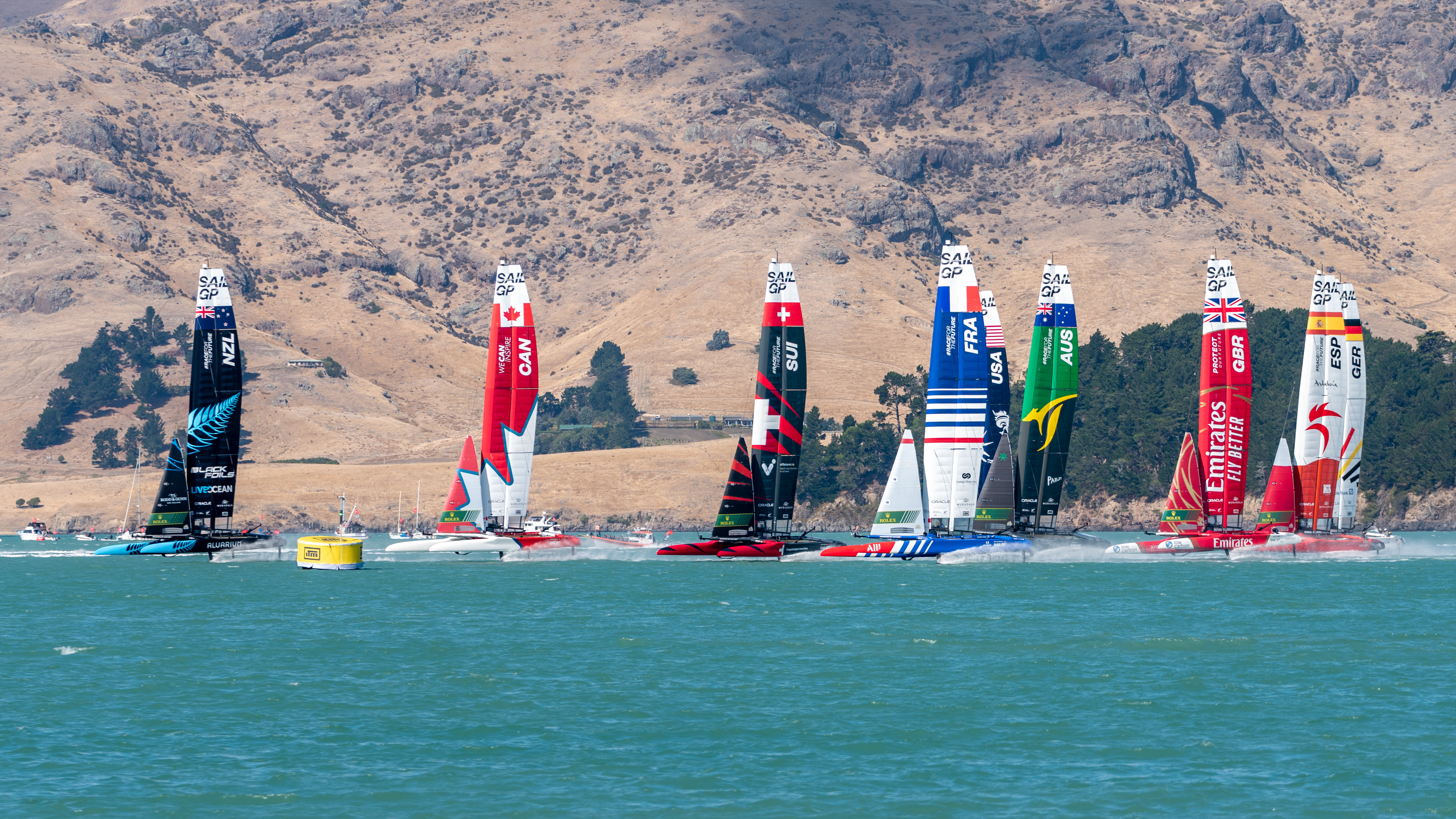
New Zealand F50 Sailing at SailGP Christchurch 2024

Season 4 was more successful even with setbacks from the wing collapse in Saint Tropez which stopped the team from sailing in Taranto, Italy.

Location	Event Result	Race 1	Race 2	Race 3	Race 4	Race 5	Final
(United States) Chicago	1st	4th	2nd	2nd	3rd	6th	1st
(United States) Los Angeles	7th	4th	5th	10th	7th	6th	–
(France) Saint-Tropez	8th	1st	6th	5th	DNS	DNS	–
(Italy) Taranto	-	–	–	–	–	–	–
(Spain) Cádiz	4th	4th	5th	8th	2nd	5th	–
(United Arab Emirates) Dubai	1st	6th	2nd	4th	2nd	4th	1st
(United Arab Emirates) Abu Dhabi	1st	1st	10th	2nd	6th	6th	1st
(Australia) Sydney	3rd	3rd	5th	1st	2nd	7th	3rd
(New Zealand) Christchurch	1st	1st	4th	2nd	–	–	1st
Bermuda	2nd	3rd	4th	4th	6th	1st	2nd
(Canada) Halifax	5th	5th	2nd	4th	5th	5th	–
(United States) New York City	1st	5th	3rd	4th	2nd	–	1st
(United States) San Francisco	4th	4th	4th	4th	3rd	7th	–
Season Result	3rd						
Citations:

==== Season Awards ====
At the end of season 4 New Zealand driver Peter Burling was crowned driver of the season in SailGP's end of season, fan-voted awards. The awards also saw fellow New Zealand strategist Liv Mackay named strategist of the Season. With New Zealand coach Ray Davies receiving coach of the season.

=== Season 5 ===
Season 5 saw transfer of flight controller Andy Maloney to Mubadala Brazil SailGP Team, Leo Takahashi joined the team in his place.

Location	Event Result	Race 1	Race 2	Race 3	Race 4	Race 5	Race 6	Race 7	Final
(United Arab Emirates) Dubai	1st	2nd	3rd	5th	1st	7th	–	–	1st
(New Zealand) Auckland	4th	4th	8th	6th	1st	4th	6th	2nd	–
(Australia) Sydney	8th	8th	7th	11th	11th	2nd	1st	5th	–
(United States) Los Angeles	2nd	1st	1st	9th	2nd	8th	2nd	4th	2nd
(United States) San Francisco	5th	4th	8th	6th	3rd	8th	3rd	1st	–
(United States) New York City	2nd	2nd	11th	1st	4th	2nd	4th	–	2nd
(United Kingdom) Portsmouth	1st	2nd	4th	1st	11th	1st	5th	1st	1st
(Germany) Sassnitz	4th	5th	4th	10th	1st	9th	5th	5th	–
(France) Saint-Tropez	2nd	5th	1st	3rd	5th	–	–	–	–
(Switzerland) Geneva	8th	1st	5th	11th	5th	10th	–	–	–
(Spain) Cádiz	2nd	11th	2nd	6th	3rd	2nd	3rd	8th	2nd
(United Arab Emirates) Abu Dhabi	9th	7th	5th	11th	6th	8th	8th		
Season Result	3rd								
Citations:

== Impact league ==
=== Season 2 ===
New Zealand accumulated the most points during the inaugural season of Impact League, they won the Impact League Trophy as well as $100,000 for their purpose partner Live Ocean's work on marine conservation. The team's main focus was The Race to Save the Endangered Antipodean Albatross, ensuring protection of seabirds migrating over international waters. Their efforts resulted in a Memorandum of Understanding being signed between the governments of New Zealand and Spain.

=== Season 3 ===
New Zealand's highlights throughout the season included its Moanamana Project in collaboration with Live Ocean, which saw $50K distributed to climate-resilient kelp research in Whakarāupo Lyttelton. The team finished in second place, accumulating only five points less than the winners, Rockwool Denmark.

=== Season 4 ===
Black Foils continued to work with their purpose partner Live Ocean in Season 4. They finished the season in 5th place.

=== Season 5 ===
Black Foils continue to work with their purpose partner Live Ocean in Season 5.

== See also ==
- F50 (catamaran)
- New Zealand national team nomenclature based on the "All Blacks"
- Yacht racing
- Team New Zealand
