= Diego Botín =

Spanish sailor (born 1993)

Personal information
- Full name: Diego Botin-Sanz de Sautuola Le Chever (Note: In this Spanish name, the first or paternal surname is Botín (Botín-Sanz de Sautuola).)
- Born: 25 December 1993 (age 32) Santander, Spain
- Height: 183 cm (6 ft 0 in)
- Weight: 81 kg (179 lb)

Sailing career
- Sport: Sailing
- Club: Real Club Maritimo Santander
- Class(es): 49er, Foiling50, Moth, 420
Medal record
Men's sailing
Representing Spain
Olympic Games
Gold medal – first place	2024 Paris	49er
SailGP
Gold medal – first place	Season 4 - 2023/24	F50

Diego Botin (born 25 December 1993) is a Spanish sailor. He and Iago López placed ninth in the 49er event at the 2016 Summer Olympics and fourth at the 2020 Summer Olympics. In tandem with Florian Trittel, he won the gold medal in the 49er class at the 2024 Summer Olympics.

== Personal ==
Botín is the son of Gonzalo Botín Naveda and grandson of Jaime Botín. He is a member of the Botín family of Banco Santander.
