= Australia SailGP Team =

Sailing team

(Australia) Bonds Flying Roos SailGP Team
- Bonds Flying Roos SailGP Team Logo

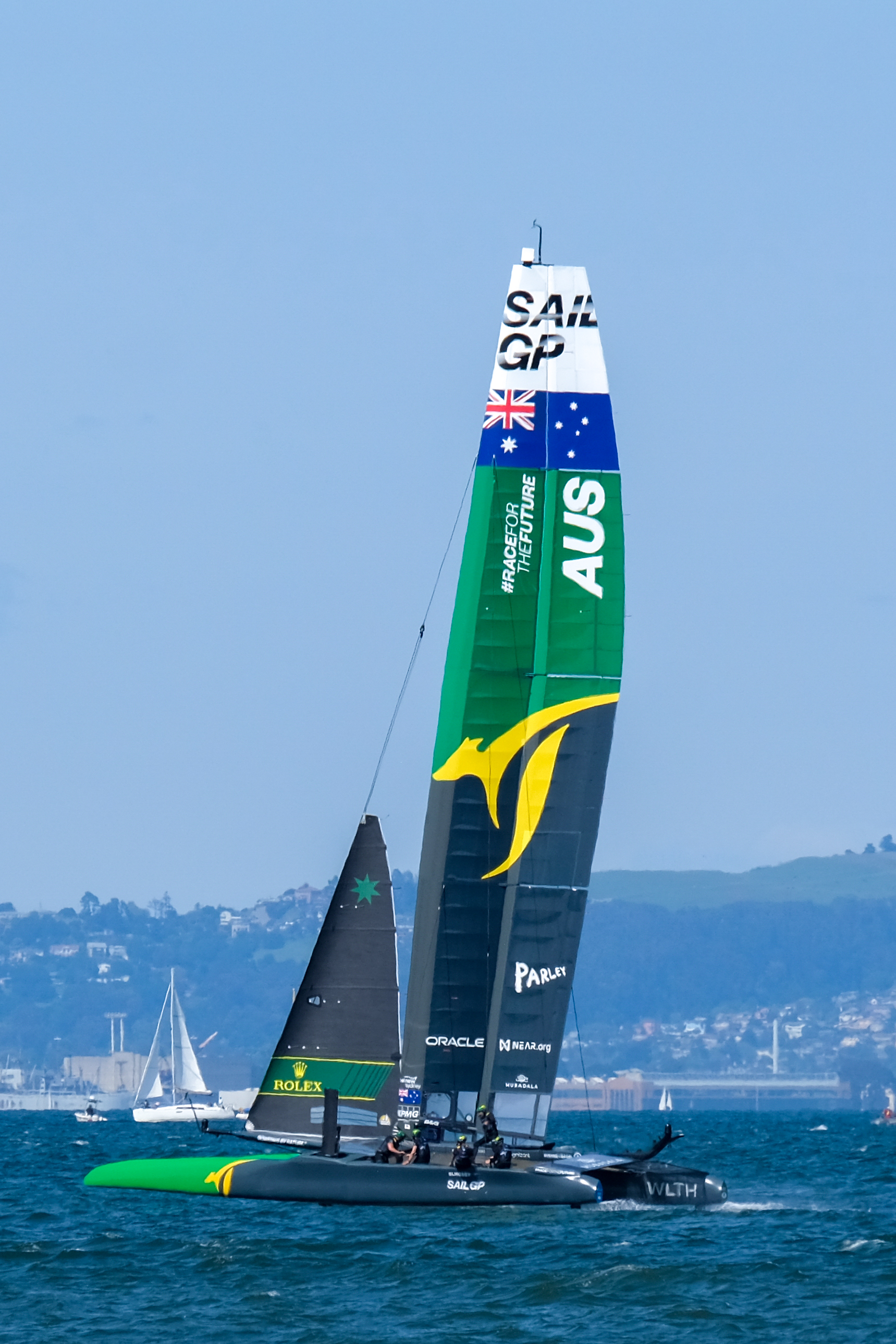
- BONDS Flying Roos in San Francisco in 2023

Bonds Flying Roos SailGP Team
- Esablished: 2018

Team Line-Up
- Driver, CEO, Co-Owner: (Australia) Tom Slingsby
- Wing Trimmer: (Australia) Iain Jensen
- Flight controller: (Australia) Jason Waterhouse
- Strategist: (Australia) Tash Bryant
- Grinder: (Australia) Kinley Fowler (Australia) Sam Newton
- Reserve: (Australia) Tom Needham
- Coach: (Australia) Ben Durham (Head Coach) (France) Hugo Stubler (Coach Assistant)

SailGP Career
- First entry: 2019 Sydney Sail Grand Prix
- SailGP Championships: 3 (2019, 2021–22, 2023–24)
- Website: sailgp.com/teams/australia

Australia SailGP Team, officially the Bonds Flying Roos, is an Australian sailing team that participates in the international SailGP championship. Founded in 2018 for the inaugural season of SailGP, the team has been led by driver, CEO and Co-Owner Tom Slingsby since its creation. The team are three-time champions, having won the first three seasons of the competition. They finished runners up in Season 4 and Season 5. They currently lead the 2026 Season Championship.

== History ==
Australia SailGP Team was established in 2018 by F50 League LLC as a part of the inaugural season of the SailGP competition. At the helm is Tom Slingsby, an Olympic gold medalist and America’s Cup Winner.

It won the league's inaugural 2019 season, as well as the subsequent 2021–22 (Season 2) and 2022–23 (Season 3) seasons. They finished runners up in 2023-24 (Season 4) behind Spain and in 2024–25 (Season 5) behind Emirates GBR.

British sailor Chris Draper signed with the team as Trimmer for 2025 following the departure of Kyle Langford to Redbull Italy.

In June 2025, Hugh Jackman and Ryan Reynolds joined Tom Slingsby as co-owners of the Australia SailGP Team, renaming it Bonds Flying Roos, gaining Australian clothing company Bonds as title sponsor. Monday.com were brought on as Global Partner and Blueberry were named Team Partner.

Ahead of the 2026 Season, the team announced the signing of Australian Wing Trimmer Iain Jensen, who had just won the 2025 season onboard rivals Emirates Great Britain. Chris Draper departed and joined new team Artemis Sweden.

Former team members include Kyle Langford (Season 1-4), Ky Hurst (Season 1) Nick Hutton (Season 1), Lucy Copeland (Season 2), Nina Curtis (Season 2-4) Chris Draper (Season 5), Jimmy Spithill (One event in Season 4 while Tom Slingsby and his partner were having a baby), and Glenn Ashby (Two events in 2026 as injury replacement for Iain Jensen).

In May 2026, Disney+ announced that they greenlit a new docuseries from Maximum Effort following the team and their co-owners Hugh Jackman and Ryan Reynolds.

== Results ==
Season	Driver	Position
2019	(Australia) Tom Slingsby	1st
2021–22	(Australia) Tom Slingsby	1st
2022–23	(Australia) Tom Slingsby	1st
2023–24	(Australia) Tom Slingsby (Australia) Jimmy Spithill	2nd
2024–25	(Australia) Tom Slingsby	2nd
