= Rome Kirby =

American sailor

Rome Kirby is an American sailor who has competed in the Volvo Ocean Race and multiple America's Cups.

Kirby is a native of Newport, Rhode Island. His father, Jerry Kirby, has sailed in three Volvo Ocean Races and six America's Cups. They are believed to be the first father and son to win the America's Cup.

Kirby was an alternate for Puma Racing, supporting Il Mostro during the 2008–09 Volvo Ocean Race. He then sailed with Puma Racing on Mar Mostro during the 2011–12 Volvo Ocean Race. He was the youngest sailor in the six-boat fleet.

Kirby then joined Oracle Racing and sailed on Oracle Team USA 17 as a trimmer, when it successfully defended the 2013 America's Cup. He was the youngest sailor on the boat.

He remained with the team and sailed in the 2011–13 America's Cup World Series as a tactician but did not sail in the 2017 America's Cup, acting as a reserve.

Rome Kirby became the Captain of Team USA for SailGP in 2019.
