= F50 (catamaran) =

Class of catamaran

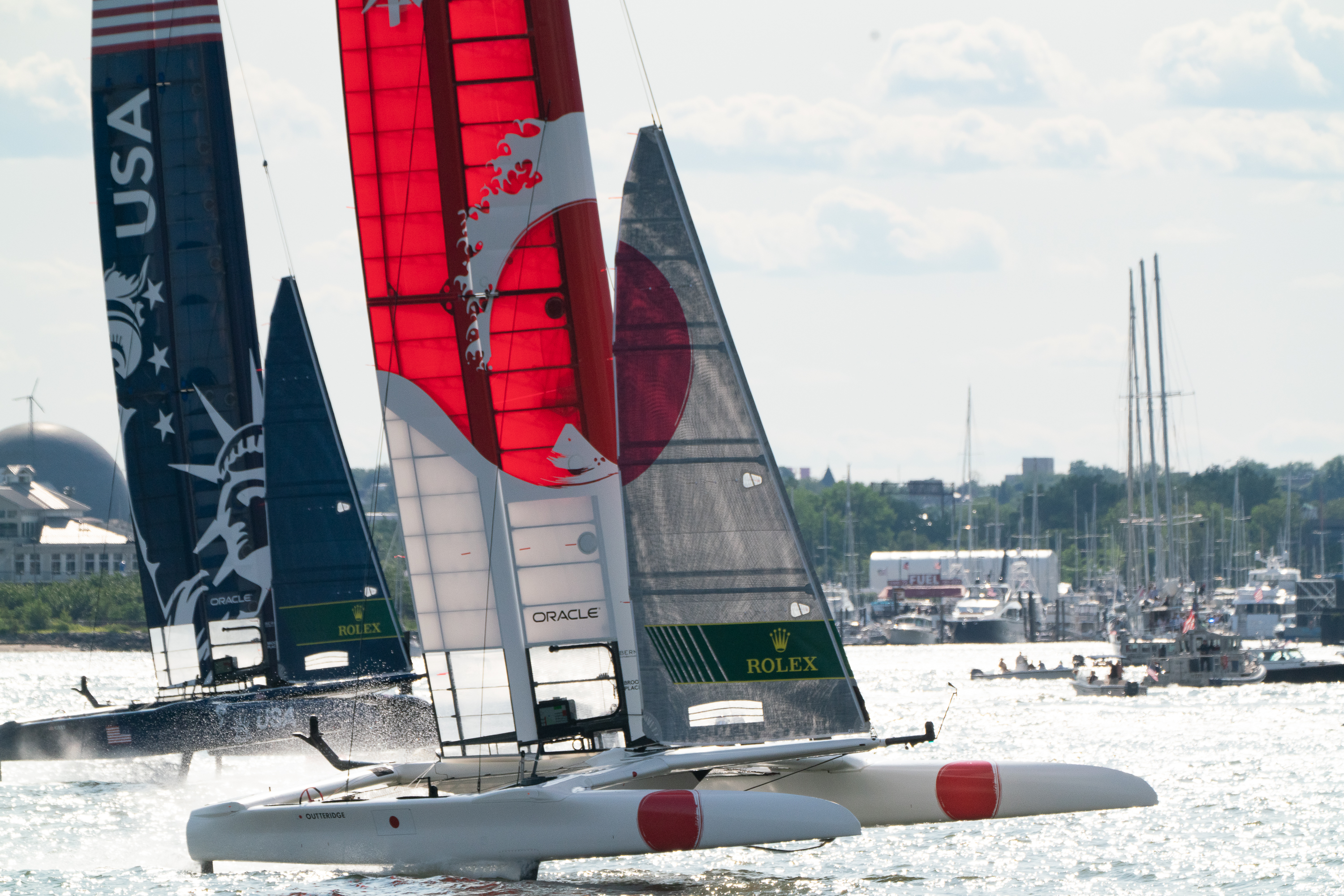
- The American and Japanese SailGP F50s racing in New York Harbor at the New York Sail Grand Prix during the 2019 SailGP championship.

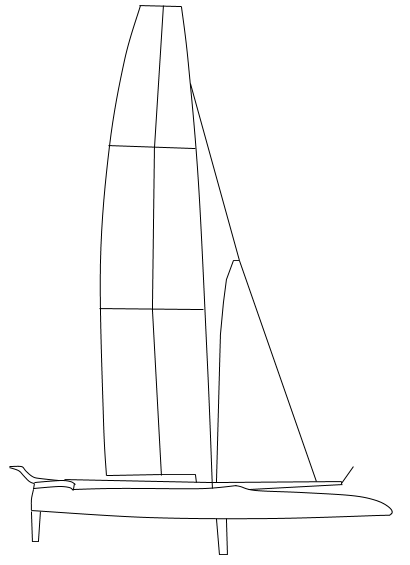
- A line drawing of the F50 with its standard twenty-four metre wingsail.

Development
- Year: 2019
- No. built: 14
- Design: Development, one-design
- Builder: Core Builders Composites
- Name: F50

Boat
- Crew: 6, weight limit 438 kg (966 lb)

Hull
- Type: Foiling catamaran
- LOA: 15 m (49 ft 3 in)
- Beam: 8.8 m (28 ft 10 in)

Rig
- Rig type: Wing and jib
- Mast height: 18 m (59 ft), 24 m (79 ft), 29 m (95 ft)

The F50 is a one-design foiling catamaran used in the SailGP race series. The name is an abbreviation of "Foiling" and "a hull length of 50 feet". The F50s are adapted from the AC50s used in the America's Cup, with modifications including new control systems and modular wingsails.

The F50s are one of the fastest racing classes in history; the current F50 speed record, achieved by DS Automobiles France at the Germany Sail Grand Prix in Sassnitz in 2026, stands at 58.11 knots (107.63 km/h, 66.88 mph).

Three AC50s from the 2017 America's Cup were converted to comply with the F50 one-design rule to create the new SailGP fleet racing circuit. Three more boats were built from scratch by Core Builders Composites to create an initial fleet of six boats crewed by teams from the United States, Australia, France, China, Japan, and the United Kingdom. For the 2020 SailGP championship, the Spain SailGP team used the F50 of the China SailGP team after their departure. A seventh F50 was commissioned for the Denmark SailGP team, which also joined for the 2020 SailGP championship. In the fourth season the fleet grew to 10 boats, with two more expected for the fifth season.

== Specifications ==
The F50s use a two-element wingsail and jib for propulsion. One removable section in the wing can be used to achieve mast heights of 18 m (59 ft), 24 m (79 ft) or 29 m (95 ft), the largest being introduced in Season 2. This, as well as interchangeable daggerboards and rudders, allows for optimized performance in different wind conditions. Originally equipped with 'L' Foils, the design swapped to 'T' Foils at the beginning of 2025. In SailGP regattas, the mast height, jib and equipment are selected in competitions by the Tech Team Operations Manager, following a consultation with the Regatta Director and representatives from each team.

Apart from the wingsheet, which is powered by two grinders, all trimming is hydraulically actuated, powered by electric motors and lithium-ion batteries. This includes active pitch control of all appendages, daggerboard lifting/lowering, and the jibsheet. The reduction of one grinding position on board therefore allows the F50s to sail with just five crew. The geometry of the F50's daggerboards have been extended outside the maximum beam of the boat to provide more righting moment.

The F50s comprise a one-design development class. However, unlike most one-design sail classes with fixed rules, the F50s are being constantly developed with changes implemented on all boats at the same time. This prevents technological arms races, while allowing performance improvements.

== Crew ==
The F50s have a crew of six, consisting of a helmsman, wing trimmer, flight controller, two grinders and a strategist. The flight controller controls the F50 using a double twist-grip device, which enables more accurate adjustment of the rake of the daggerboard. This relieves the helmsman, who previously flew the boat using twist-grips on the wheel, of flight control duties - allowing them to focus on tactics. Additionally, the F50s have active control of the rudder pitch; crews are no longer required to set and lock off the rudder pitch before the start of each race, as was the case with the AC50s in the 2017 America's Cup. While racing, crews stay in the windward hull.

== F50s in culture ==
F50s were featured in Christopher Nolan's Tenet (2020). The scene featuring them was filmed in August 2019, following the 2019 Great Britain Sail Grand Prix in Cowes. The F50s belonging to the Japan and United States SailGP teams were used, with each being rebranded and painted white and blue respectively. Rome Kirby and Tom Slingsby were two of the athletes involved in the filming of the scene.
