= 2026 SailGP championship =

6th season of SailGP sailing competition

Rolex SailGP 2026 Championship
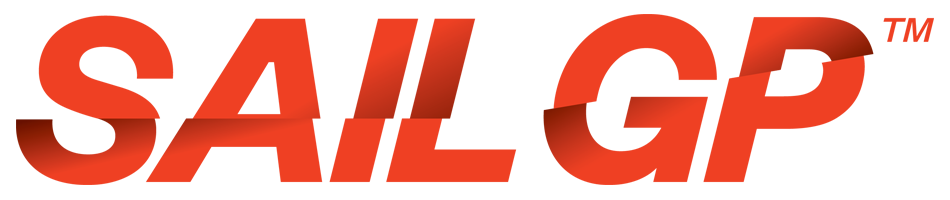
- SailGP's logo

Event title
- Name: Rolex SailGP 2026 Championship
- Dates: 17 January to 29 November 2026
- Yachts: F50

Results
- Winner: TBA

The 2026 SailGP Championship, officially the Rolex SailGP 2026 Championship is the ongoing sixth season of the SailGP championship. The season is being contested over thirteen sail grands prix held at venues around the world. Teams are competing for both the season championship and the impact league. Emirates GBR are both the reigning season champions and impact league winners.

== Entries ==
Team	Driver	Events
(Australia) Bonds Flying Roos SailGP Team	(Australia) Tom Slingsby	1-11
Mubadala Brazil SailGP Team	(Brazil) Martine Grael	1-6, 8-10
Mubadala Brazil SailGP Team	(United Kingdom) Paul Goodison	7, 11
(Canada) NorthStar SailGP Team	(United Kingdom) Giles Scott	1-11
(Denmark) Rockwool Racing SailGP Team	(Denmark) Nicolai Sehested	1-11
DS Automobiles SailGP Team France	(France) Quentin Delapierre	1-2, 4-11
(United Kingdom) Emirates Great Britain SailGP Team	(United Kingdom) Dylan Fletcher	1-11
Germany SailGP Team presented by Deutsche Bank	(Germany) Erik Heil	1-11
Red Bull Italy SailGP Team	(New Zealand) Phil Robertson	1-11
(New Zealand) Black Foils SailGP Team	(New Zealand) Peter Burling	1-2, 7-11
(Spain) Los Gallos SailGP Team	(Spain) Diego Botín	2-11
(Sweden) Artemis SailGP Team	(Australia) Nathan Outteridge	1-11
Switzerland SailGP Team	(Switzerland) Sébastien Schneiter	1-11
United States SailGP Team	(United States) Taylor Canfield	1-10
United States SailGP Team	(Brazil) Martine Grael	11
Citations:

=== Team changes ===
Artemis SailGP Team driven by Nathan Outteridge will become the thirteenth team for the 2026 season.

== Calendar ==
The first look at the Race Calendar for 2026 was announced on April 16, 2025, and features new stops in Perth, Australia and Rio De Janeiro as well as the awaited return to Halifax.

Rnd	Host	Title	Dates	Winning team
1	Perth, Australia	Oracle Perth Sail Grand Prix presented by KPMG	17–18 January 2026	(United Kingdom) Emirates GBR
2	Auckland, New Zealand	ITM New Zealand Sail Grand Prix	14–15 February 2026	(Australia) Bonds Flying Roos
3	Sydney, Australia	KPMG Sydney Sail Grand Prix	28 February – 1 March 2026	(United States) US SailGP Team
4	Rio de Janeiro, Brazil	Enel Rio Sail Grand Prix	11–12 April 2026	(Australia) Bonds Flying Roos
5	Bermuda	Apex Group Bermuda Sail Grand Prix	10–11 May 2026	(Australia) Bonds Flying Roos
6	New York City, United States	Mubadala New York Sail Grand Prix	31 May – 1 June 2026	(Australia) Bonds Flying Roos
7	Halifax, Canada	Canada Sail Grand Prix	21–22 June 2026	(Spain) Los Gallos
8	(United Kingdom) Portsmouth, Great Britain	Emirates Great Britain Sail Grand Prix	26–27 July 2026	(Spain) Los Gallos
9	Sassnitz, Germany	Germany Sail Grand Prix	23–24 August 2026	(Australia) Bonds Flying Roos
10	Valencia, Spain	Spain Sail Grand Prix	5-6 September 2026	(United States) US SailGP Team
11	Geneva, Switzerland	Rolex Switzerland Sail Grand Prix	19–20 September 2026	(Spain) Los Gallos
12	Dubai, United Arab Emirates	Emirates Dubai Sail Grand Prix presented by DP World	21–22 November 2026	TBD
13	Abu Dhabi, United Arab Emirates	Mubadala Abu Dhabi Sail Grand Prix 2026 Season Grand Final, presented by Abu Dhabi Sport Council	28–29 November 2026	TBD
Citations:

== Season ==
Key
Colour	Result
1	Winner
2	Second place
3	Third place
4–13	Finish
DNF	Did not finish
DNS	Did not start
DSQ	Disqualified
WH	Withheld from racing
C	Race cancelled

=== Round 1: Oracle Perth Sail Grand Prix presented by KPMG ===
Results

Pos	Team	1	2	3	4	5	6	7	F
1	(United Kingdom) Emirates GBR	5	3	7	5	1	1	4	1
2	(Australia) Bonds Flying Roos	1	8	9	2	3	3	3	2
3	DS Team France	2	1	2	8	5	2	2	3
4	(Sweden) Artemis	9	2	1	1	6	4	11	
5	United States	3	4	3	3	9	8	9	
6	(Canada) NorthStar	4	9	4	10	7	6	1	
7	Red Bull Italy	7	5	10	6	2	7	5	
8	(Denmark) Rockwool Racing	6	10	6	7	4	10	6	
9	Germany by Deutsche Bank	10	7	5	9	8	9	8	
10	Mubadala Brazil	8	6	8	4	11	11	10	
11	Switzerland	DNF	DNF	DNS	DNS	10	5	7	
12	(New Zealand) Black Foils	DNF	DNS	DNS	DNS	DNS	DNS	DNS	
DNC	(Spain) Los Gallos	DNF	DNS	DNS	DNS	DNS	DNS	DNS	

Penalties

- Black Foils handed eight point penalty for collision with Switzerland in Fleet Race 1.

=== Round 2: ITM New Zealand Sail Grand Prix ===
The round was marked by strong winds across both days of racing, which contributed to a severe collision between the New Zealand and French teams during the third race. As a consequence, the fleet was split with separate races on the second day, to allow more space per boat on the course.

== Results ==
Points are awarded per race for the Event Leaderboard, with 10 points for the winner, 9 points for second place, 8 points for third, and so on, with 11th and 12th place getting 0 points.

Each event hosts seven fleet races, with the three highest scoring teams of the event facing off in an additional final race to decide the podium order. The winner of that final wins the event, with the final standings of the event leaderboard used to award points for the Championship Leaderboard. The winner is awarded 10 Championship points, second awarded 9, and so on. Teams in 11th and 12th positions do not receive any Championship points.

In the event of a tie between two or more boats in the event or Championship leaderboard, the teams are ranked according to their finishing places in the most recent race or event.

The three highest scoring teams at the end of the season compete in the SailGP Grand Final with the winning team awarded the championship.

Pos	Team	(Australia) PER	(New Zealand) AKL	(Australia) SYD	(Brazil) RIO	(Bermuda) BER	(United States) NYC	(Canada) HAL	(United Kingdom) PSM	(Germany) SAS	(Spain) VAL	(Switzerland) GEN	(United Arab Emirates) DBA	(United Arab Emirates) ABD	(United Arab Emirates) FIN	Points (Note: Numbers in brackets show the amount of points before penalties or awarded points)
1	(Australia) Bonds Flying Roos	2	1	5	1	1	1	4	7	1	2	2				94
2	(Spain) Los Gallos	DNS	3	3	2	2	12	1	1	3	5	1				78
3	(Sweden) Artemis	4	5	9	3	11	5	2	2	5	9	7				59
4	United States	5	7	1	4	7	6	6	6	11	1	13				56
5	(United Kingdom) Emirates GBR	1	2	2	12	4	2	11	11	9	6	9				53
6	DS Team France	3	4	DNS	8	9	4	10	8	6	12	6				46
7	(Canada) NorthStar	6	10	11	10	6	3	8	3	2	10	8				44
8	(Denmark) Rockwool Racing	8	8	6	5	10	7	12	9	10	4	3				40
9	(Switzerland) Explora Journeys Swiss	DNF	11	10	11	5	8	3	4	8	7	4				39
10	Germany by Deutsche Bank	9	6	8	6	3	11	7	10	7	8	12				36
11	Red Bull Italy	7	13	4	7	8	9	9	12	12	3	11				30
12	(New Zealand) Black Foils	DNF	9	DNS	DNS	DNS	DNS	5	5	4	11	5				27
13	Mubadala Brazil	10	12	7	9	12	10	13	13	13	13	10				9
Citation:

Key
Colour	Result
1	Winner
2	Second place
3	Third place
4–13	Finish
DNF	Did not finish
DNS	Did not start
DSQ	Disqualified
WH	Withheld from racing
C	Race cancelled

== Impact League ==
As part of SailGP's sustainability initiatives, the championship runs a second leaderboard on which teams compete to have the greatest improvement in the sustainability of the sport. It encourages teams to implement sustainable practices and promote inclusivity within their organizations and communities. The league tracks teams' progress in areas such as carbon footprint reduction, gender equity, and youth engagement. The SailGP Impact League is a sustainability and inclusivity program within the global sailing league. Teams are externally audited after each round against 10 criteria, with the top three ranked teams awarded prize money to be donated to the teams' sustainability partners.New Zealand won the inaugural SailGP Impact League in 2022, followed by Rockwool Denmark in 2023 and Emirates Great Britain in 2024.
