= 2024–25 SailGP championship =

5th season of SailGP sailing competition

Rolex SailGP 2025 Championship
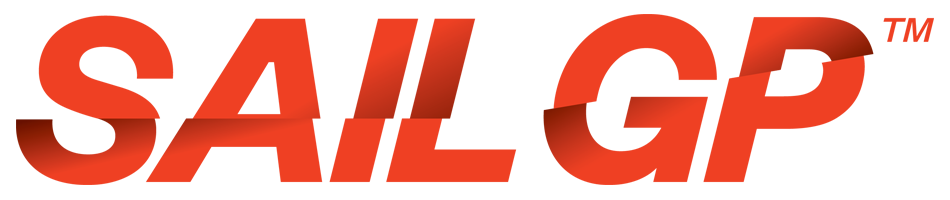

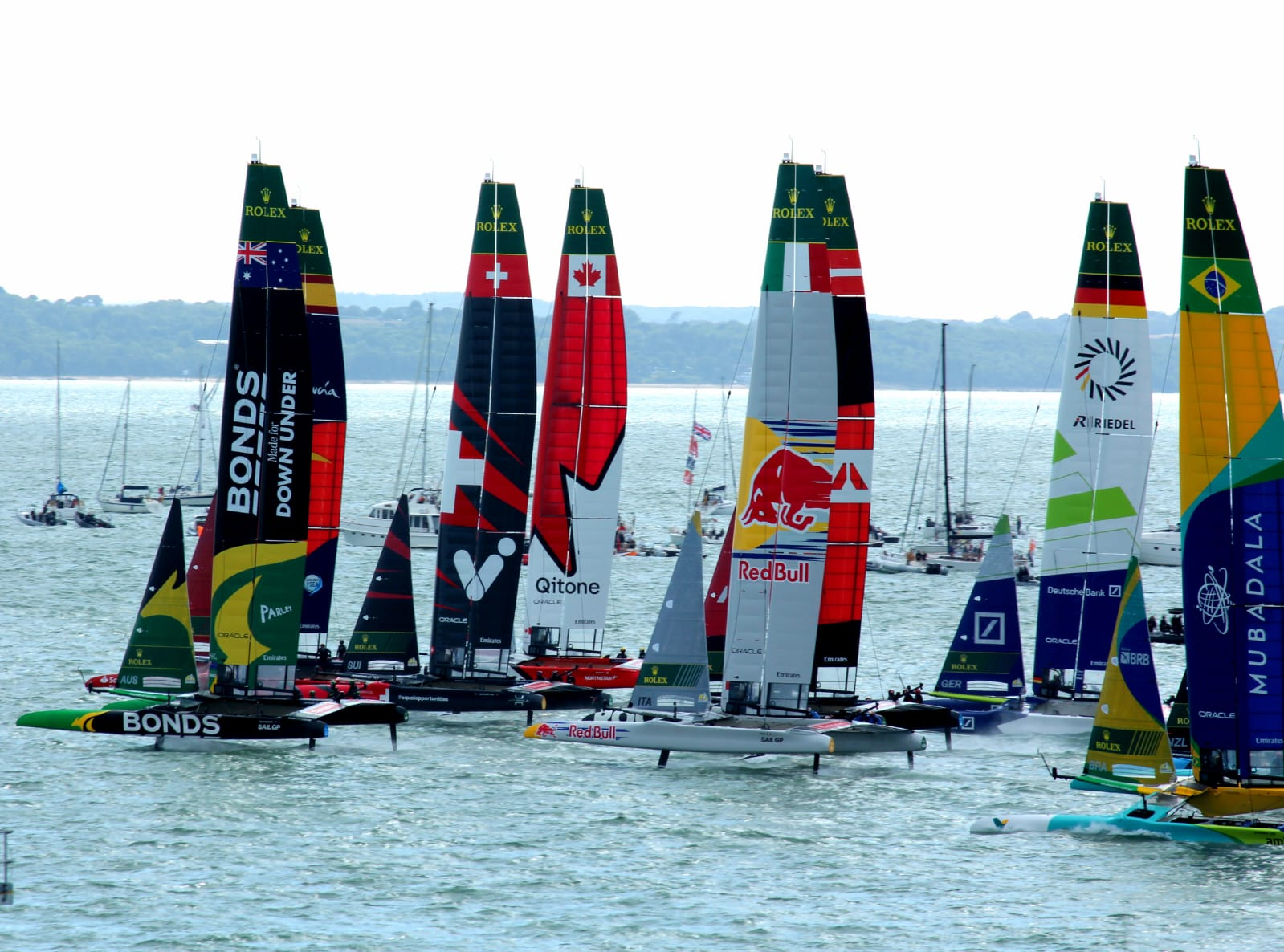

Event title
- Name: Rolex SailGP 2025 Championship
- Dates: November 23, 2024 to Nov 30, 2025
- Yachts: F50

Results
- (gold) Gold: (United Kingdom) Emirates GBR (1st title)
- (silver) Silver: (Australia) Bonds Flying Roos
- (bronze) Bronze: (New Zealand) Black Foils
- Impact League: (United Kingdom) Emirates GBR

The 2024–25 SailGP Championship, officially the Rolex SailGP 2025 Championship, was the fifth season of the SailGP championship. The season was contested over twelve sail grands prix held at venues around the world. The season saw Emirates GBR win both their first title in the season championship and the impact league, becoming the first team to be double crowned.

== Entries ==
Team	Helm	Events
(Australia) Bonds Flying Roos SailGP Team (Note: The Australian team was rebranded beginning with in New York (round six), following its transition from series to private ownership.)	(Australia) Tom Slingsby	1–12
Mubadala Brazil SailGP Team	(Brazil) Martine Grael	1–7, 9–12
(Canada) NorthStar SailGP Team	(United Kingdom) Giles Scott	1–12
(Denmark) Rockwool Racing SailGP Team	(Denmark) Nicolai Sehested	1–4, 6–12
France SailGP Team	(France) Quentin Delapierre	3–12
(United Kingdom) Emirates Great Britain SailGP Team	(United Kingdom) Dylan Fletcher	1–12
Germany SailGP Team presented by Deutsche Bank	(Germany) Erik Heil	1–12
Red Bull Italy SailGP Team	(Italy) Ruggero Tita	1–11
Red Bull Italy SailGP Team	(New Zealand) Phil Robertson	12
(New Zealand) Black Foils SailGP Team	(New Zealand) Peter Burling	1–12
(Spain) Los Gallos SailGP Team	(Spain) Diego Botín	1–12
Switzerland SailGP Team	(Switzerland) Sébastien Schneiter	1–12
United States SailGP Team	(United States) Taylor Canfield	1–2, 4–12
Citations:

=== Team changes ===
Teams from Brazil and Italy joined the fifth season of the competition, helmed by Martine Grael and Ruggero Tita respectively.

== Calendar ==
The Race Calendar for 2024-25 was announced on July 9, 2024, and features new stops in Brazil, UAE, a yet to be announced Middle Eastern Country, Germany, Switzerland and a return to Great Britain. Notably; fans from Canada and Bermuda were disappointed to not have return visits to their countries but remain hopeful to be included in a sixth season.

Rnd	Host	Title	Dates	Winning team
1	Dubai, United Arab Emirates	Emirates Dubai Sail Grand Prix presented by P&O Marinas	November 23–24, 2024	(New Zealand) Black Foils
2	Auckland, New Zealand	ITM New Zealand Sail Grand Prix | Auckland	January 18–19, 2025	(Australia) Bonds Flying Roos
3	Sydney, Australia	KPMG Australia Sail Grand Prix | Sydney	February 8–9, 2025	(United Kingdom) Emirates GBR
4	Los Angeles, United States	Rolex Los Angeles Sail Grand Prix	March 15–16, 2025	(Canada) NorthStar
5	San Francisco, United States	Oracle San Francisco Sail Grand Prix	March 22–23, 2025	(Spain) Los Gallos
– (Note: After identifying a potential defect in select wingsails across the fleet, SailGP cancelled the Rio event in order to facilitate required repairs)	Rio de Janeiro, Brazil	Enel Rio Sail Grand Prix	May 3–4, 2025	Removed
6	New York City, United States	Mubadala New York Sail Grand Prix	June 7–8, 2025	(Spain) Los Gallos
7	(United Kingdom) Portsmouth, Great Britain	Emirates Great Britain Sail Grand Prix | Portsmouth	July 19–20, 2025	(New Zealand) Black Foils
8	Sassnitz, Germany	Germany Sail Grand Prix | Sassnitz	August 16–17, 2025	France
– (Note: Taranto event has been replaced with Saint-Tropez event after changes at the Taranto City Council in late 2024)	Taranto, Italy	Rockwool Italy Sail Grand Prix | Taranto	September 6–7, 2025	Removed
9	Saint-Tropez, France	Rockwool France Sail Grand Prix | Saint-Tropez	September 12-13, 2025	(United Kingdom) Emirates GBR
10	Geneva, Switzerland	Rolex Switzerland Sail Grand Prix | Geneva	September 20–21, 2025	Germany by Deutsche Bank
11	Cádiz, Spain	DP World Spain Sail Grand Prix | Andalucía - Cádiz	October 4–5, 2025	(United Kingdom) Emirates GBR
– (Note: This event was removed from the official calendar without any explanation from SailGP)	TBA, Middle East	TBA	November 7–8, 2025	Removed
12	Abu Dhabi, United Arab Emirates	Mubadala Abu Dhabi SailGP 2024/2025 Season Grand Final, presented by Abu Dhabi Sport Council	November 29–30, 2025	(Denmark) Rockwool Racing
Citations:

== Season ==
Key
Colour	Result
1	Winner
2	Second place
3	Third place
4–12	Finish
DNF	Did not finish
DNS	Did not start
DSQ	Disqualified
WH	Withheld from racing
C	Race cancelled

=== Round 1: Dubai ===
Emirates Dubai Sail Grand Prix presented by P&O Marinas marked the debut of two new teams joining the fleet - Mubadala Brazil and Red Bull Italy.

Due to a shortage of F50 catamarans, only 11 teams were able to race in the Emirates Dubai Sail Grand Prix presented by P&O Marinas. France SailGP Team's potential new ownership group opted to wait for the league's newest F50 and miss the first event, for which France were awarded compensatory points.

Results

Pos	Team	1	2	3	4	5	F
1	(New Zealand) Black Foils	2	3	5	1	7	1
2	(United Kingdom) Emirates GBR	5	8	2	3	3	2
3	United States	1	7	7	6	2	3
4	(Spain) Los Gallos	8	6	3	2	4	
5	(Australia) Bonds Flying Roos	3	5	1	4	10	
6	(Denmark) Rockwool Racing	6	9	11	5	1	
7	(Canada) NorthStar	9	2	4	8	6	
8	Switzerland	4	4	8	9	8	
9	Germany by Deutsche Bank	7	1	10	10	5	
10	Mubadala Brazil	11	10	6	7	11	
11	Red Bull Italy	10	11	9	11	9	
DNC	France	DNS	DNS	DNS	DNS	DNS	

Spain reached the highest speed of the event: 64.8 km/h / 40.3 mph / 35 knots

=== Round 2: Auckland ===
After nearly two years of testing, SailGP has introduced its new high-speed titanium T-Foils to the entire F50 fleet at the ITM New Zealand Sail Grand Prix | Auckland. Constructed from machined titanium and carbon, the high-speed T-Foils have thinner sections than the former L-Foils, reducing drag at high speeds.

France SailGP Team, which had been due to rejoin the fleet, was not on the start line in Auckland due to the discovery of an issue in the titanium wingsail connectors of the team's new F50, that could not be resolved in time for France to compete.

On the second day of ITM New Zealand Sail Grand Prix | Auckland, Canadian flight controller Billy Gooderham was injured during a maneuver in pre-racing warm up ahead of official racing. The team was not able to compete in remaining races.

==== Results ====
Pos	Team	1	2	3	4	5	6	7	F
1	(Australia) Bonds Flying Roos	5	1	2	2	1	2	DNF	1
2	(Spain) Los Gallos	2	4	4	8	5	3	3	2
3	(United Kingdom) Emirates GBR	1	2	9	4	2	4	6	3
4	(New Zealand) Black Foils	4	8	6	1	4	6	2	
5	(Denmark) Rockwool Racing	6	5	5	5	8	1	1	
6	Red Bull Italy	3	3	7	7	3	9	8	
7	Switzerland	11	10	1	3	10	10	4	
8	Germany by Deutsche Bank	8	11	DNS	9	6	7	5	
9	Mubadala Brazil	10	9	8	11	7	5	7	
10	(Canada) NorthStar	9	7	3	6	DNS	DNS	DNS	
11	United States	7	6	10	10	9	8	9	
DNC	France	DNS	DNS	DNS	DNS	DNS	DNS	DNS	

Spain reached the highest speed of the event: 96 km/h / 59.7 mph / 51.8 knots

===== Penalties =====
- Rockwool Racing SailGP Team were handed two penalty points for hitting a race mark during Fleet Race 7.

=== Round 3: Sydney ===
United States SailGP Team capsized while being towed to the practise racecourse on Friday, the damage caused to the wing made the Americans unable to compete in the event.

After sitting out the first two events, France SailGP Team returned to the competition in Sydney.

Results

Pos	Team	1	2	3	4	5	6	7	F
1	(United Kingdom) Emirates GBR	5	1	3	3	1	6	7	1
2	(Canada) NorthStar	7	8	5	4	4	2	4	2
3	(Australia) Bonds Flying Roos	3	2	1	1	3	3	1	3
4	(Denmark) Rockwool Racing	6	4	4	6	7	4	6	
5	Switzerland	1	6	2	9	9	11	2	
6	France	4	3	8	2	6	9	8	
7	(Spain) Los Gallos	2	9	7	5	5	5	9	
8	(New Zealand) Black Foils	8	7	11	11	2	1	5	
9	Red Bull Italy	9	10	9	8	10	10	11	
10	Mubadala Brazil	11	5	10	10	DNF	8	10	
11	Germany by Deutsche Bank	10	11	6	7	8	7	3	
DNC	United States	DNS	DNS	DNS	DNS	DNS	DNS	DNS	

Australia reached the highest speed of the event: 96.4 km/h / 59.9 mph / 52 knots

==== Penalties ====
- Germany SailGP Team presented by Deutsche Bank handed 12 penalty points for incident involving Mubadala Brazil SailGP Team during practice racing
- Germany SailGP Team presented by Deutsche Bank handed 12 penalty points for incident involving Red Bull Italy SailGP Team during practice racing
- Germany SailGP Team presented by Deutsche Bank handed eight penalty points for causing damage to F50 wing during transit
- Mubadala Brazil SailGP Team handed eight penalty points for incident involving Germany SailGP Team presented by Deutsche Bank during practice racing
- United States SailGP Team handed 12 penalty points for causing damage to F50 wing during transit

=== Round 4: Los Angeles ===
Rockwool Racing SailGP Team collided with a mark during race 1 of Rolex Los Angeles Sail Grand Prix. The sustained damage ruled them out of competition.

Results

Pos	Team	1	2	3	4	5	6	7	F
1	(Canada) NorthStar	3	2	5	6	3	3	5	1
2	(New Zealand) Black Foils	1	1	9	2	9	2	4	2
3	(Australia) Bonds Flying Roos	10	3	1	3	5	1	7	3
4	(United Kingdom) Emirates GBR	4	4	8	7	1	6	1	
5	(Spain) Los Gallos	2	7	10	4	2	11	6	
6	France	6	9	3	1	4	8	11	
7	Germany by Deutsche Bank	8	5	7	11	7	7	2	
8	Red Bull Italy	9	6	6	8	11	4	3	
9	United States	7	8	4	5	10	9	8	
10	Switzerland	5	11	11	10	6	5	9	
11	Mubadala Brazil	11	10	2	9	9	10	10	
12	(Denmark) Rockwool Racing	DNF	DNS	DNS	DNS	DNS	DNS	DNS	

(Denmark) Rockwool Racing reached the highest speed of the event: 85.3 km/h / 53 mph / 46.1 knots

==== Penalties ====
- Rockwool Racing SailGP Team handed 12 penalty points for colliding with mark during Fleet Race 1

=== Round 5: San Francisco ===
After collision with a mark at Rolex Los Angeles Sail Grand Prix, the damage to Rockwool Racing's F50 proved to be too extensive to be fixed in time, as a result they were ruled out of racing in San Francisco.

6 seconds before the start of Race 7 Australia's wing collapsed, the cause is still unknown. The team couldn't race in the Event Final despite finishing fleet racing in 3rd place, France, who placed 4th, joined the top 2 teams instead.

Results

Pos	Team	1	2	3	4	5	6	7	F
1	(Spain) Los Gallos	3	6	1	5	3	1	2	1
2	(Canada) NorthStar	5	1	2	1	4	10	5	2
3	France	1	10	8	2	2	5	3	3
4	(Australia) Bonds Flying Roos	2	3	3	4	5	2	DNF	
5	(New Zealand) Black Foils	4	8	6	3	8	3	1	
6	Switzerland	7	5	7	7	1	4	7	
7	(United Kingdom) Emirates GBR	8	2	4	11	11	7	6	
8	Red Bull Italy	6	9	5	10	7	6	9	
9	Mubadala Brazil	10	7	11	6	6	9	4	
10	Germany by Deutsche Bank	9	4	10	8	9	11	8	
11	United States	11	11	9	9	10	8	10	
DNC	(Denmark) Rockwool Racing	DNS	DNS	DNS	DNS	DNS	DNS	DNS	

United States reached the highest speed of the event: 90.2 km/h / 56 mph / 48.7 knots

=== Round 6: New York ===
Pos	Team	1	2	3	4	5	6	F
1	(Spain) Los Gallos	1	4	3	2	11	7	1
2	(New Zealand) Black Foils	2	11	1	4	2	4	2
3	France	6	3	4	3	1	5	3
4	Mubadala Brazil	9	2	5	1	4	11	
5	(Australia) Bonds Flying Roos	5	1	10	11	5	1	
6	(Denmark) Rockwool Racing	3	9	2	5	10	12	
7	(Canada) NorthStar	7	5	11	8	9	2	
8	(United Kingdom) Emirates GBR	11	6	9	10	3	3	
9	Switzerland	8	8	6	6	12	6	
10	Germany by Deutsche Bank	4	7	12	9	6	10	
11	Red Bull Italy	12	12	8	7	8	9	
12	United States	10	10	7	12	7	8	

==== Penalties ====
- United States SailGP Team handed four penalty points for making contact with Rockwool Racing SailGP Team

=== Round 7: Portsmouth ===
Pos	Team	1	2	3	4	5	6	7	F
1	(New Zealand) Black Foils	2	4	1	11	1	5	1	1
2	(United Kingdom) Emirates GBR	1	2	3	2	3	6	7	2
3	Switzerland	5	1	2	6	8	3	4	DNF
4	(Australia) Bonds Flying Roos	7	5	5	1	4	8	5	
5	Red Bull Italy	8	3	6	3	10	2	9	
6	(Spain) Los Gallos	4	6	4	10	5	11	8	
7	(Denmark) Rockwool Racing	3	10	7	7	6	4	11	
8	(Canada) NorthStar	6	8	11	9	2	10	3	
9	Mubadala Brazil	10	11	8	5	9	7	6	
10	France	DNS	DNS	DNS	DNS	11	1	2	
11	Germany by Deutsche Bank	11	9	9	4	7	9	12	
12	United States	9	7	10	8	DNS	DNS	10	

=== Round 8: Sassnitz ===
Mubadala Brazil SailGP Team did not take part in the event due to F50 damage suffered during practice racing.

Pos	Team	1	2	3	4	5	6	7	F
1	France	8	2	6	4	4	8	4	1
2	(Australia) Bonds Flying Roos	6	3	1	2	3	2	3	2
3	(United Kingdom) Emirates GBR	2	1	11	DNF	1	1	2	3
4	(New Zealand) Black Foils	5	4	10	1	9	5	5	
5	Germany by Deutsche Bank	1	7	7	6	7	3	8	
6	(Spain) Los Gallos	9	5	3	5	6	7	6	
7	(Denmark) Rockwool Racing	11	6	2	7	2	6	7	
8	(Canada) NorthStar	10	10	5	3	5	4	9	
9	Switzerland	7	8	9	8	8	10	1	
10	Red Bull Italy	4	11	8	9	10	9	10	
11	United States	3	9	4	DSQ	DNS	DNS	DNS	
DNC	Mubadala Brazil	DNS	DNS	DNS	DNS	DNS	DNS	DNS	

==== Penalties ====
- United States SailGP Team handed 12-point penalty for making contact with Emirates Great Britain during Fleet Race 4

=== Round 9: Saint-Tropez ===
Race Day 2 of the Rockwool France Sail Grand Prix | Saint-Tropez cancelled due to severe weather. Emirates Great Britain awarded win for topping leaderboard at end of Race Day 1.

Pos	Team	1	2	3	4
1	(United Kingdom) Emirates GBR	2	4	6	1
2	(New Zealand) Black Foils	5	1	3	5
3	(Spain) Los Gallos	3	3	2	12
4	Germany by Deutsche Bank	10	5	5	2
5	(Australia) Bonds Flying Roos	1	10	10	4
6	France	6	9	4	6
7	(Denmark) Rockwool Racing	4	8	7	8
8	Mubadala Brazil	7	7	DNS	3
9	Red Bull Italy	DNF	6	1	11
10	(Canada) NorthStar	9	2	11	10
11	United States	8	DNS	9	7
12	Switzerland	11	11	8	9

=== Round 10: Geneva ===
Pos	Team	1	2	3	4	5	F
1	Germany by Deutsche Bank	9	7	5	1	3	1
2	(Australia) Bonds Flying Roos	4	1	3	6	11	2
3	Switzerland	5	2	8	7	2	3
4	(United Kingdom) Emirates GBR	3	3	4	10	7	
5	(Spain) Los Gallos	7	8	6	8	1	
6	(Denmark) Rockwool Racing	2	9	7	3	9	
7	France	6	11	1	9	5	
8	(New Zealand) Black Foils	1	5	11	5	10	
9	(Canada) NorthStar	8	6	2	11	6	
10	United States	DSQ	4	12	4	4	
11	Red Bull Italy	10	10	10	2	8	
12	Mubadala Brazil	11	12	9	DNS	DNS	

=== Round 11: Cádiz ===
Pos	Team	1	2	3	4	5	6	7	F
1	(United Kingdom) Emirates GBR	1	5	5	2	5	4	6	1
2	(New Zealand) Black Foils	11	2	6	3	2	3	8	2
3	Germany by Deutsche Bank	4	4	3	12	4	2	5	3
4	(Denmark) Rockwool Racing	8	1	2	1	7	6	12	
5	(Spain) Los Gallos	12	3	9	4	1	7	7	
6	France	10	6	8	11	6	1	2	
7	(Australia) Bonds Flying Roos	9	11	1	5	3	8	9	
8	United States	3	12	11	6	8	5	4	
9	Mubadala Brazil	5	7	12	9	9	10	1	
10	(Canada) NorthStar	7	9	7	8	11	9	3	
11	Switzerland	2	8	4	10	10	11	11	
12	Red Bull Italy	6	10	10	7	12	12	10	

=== Round 12: Abu Dhabi ===
Pos	Team	1	2	3	4	5	6
1	(Denmark) Rockwool Racing	3	1	1	2	10	2
2	Red Bull Italy	8	4	3	7	5	6
3	France	11	2	10	8	14	1
4	(Canada) NorthStar	2	6	12	6	2	7
5	United States	6	3	4	12	11	4
6	(United Kingdom) Emirates GBR	9	11	9	4	1	5
7	Germany by Deutsche Bank	1	12	6	10	3	11
8	Switzerland	5	7	2	1	12	9
9	(New Zealand) Black Foils	7	5	11	9	8	8
10	(Spain) Los Gallos	12	9	5	11	7	3
11	(Australia) Bonds Flying Roos	10	10	8	5	6	10
12	Mubadala Brazil	4	8	7	3	9	12

Germany reached the highest speed of the event: 31.14 km/h / 19.34 mph / 16.8 knots

=== Grand Final: Abu Dhabi ===
Pos	Team	1
1	(United Kingdom) Emirates GBR	1
2	(Australia) Bonds Flying Roos	2
3	(New Zealand) Black Foils	3

== Results ==
Points are awarded per race for the Event Leaderboard, with 10 points for the winner, 9 points for second place, 8 points for third, and so on, with 11th and 12th place getting 0 points.

Each event hosts seven fleet races, with the three highest scoring teams of the event facing off in an additional final race to decide the podium order. The winner of that final wins the event, with the final standings of the event leaderboard used to award points for the Championship Leaderboard. The winner is awarded 10 Championship points, second awarded 9, and so on. Teams in 11th and 12th positions do not receive any Championship points.

In the event of a tie between two or more boats in the event or Championship leaderboard, the teams are ranked according to their finishing places in the most recent race or event.

The three highest scoring teams at the end of the season compete in the SailGP Grand Final with the winning team awarded the championship.

Pos	Team	(United Arab Emirates) DUB	(New Zealand) AKL	(Australia) SYD	(United States) LA	(United States) SFN	(United States) NYC	(United Kingdom) PSM	(Germany) SAS	(France) STP	(Switzerland) GEN	(Spain) CDZ	(United Arab Emirates) ABD	(United Arab Emirates) FIN	Points (Note: Numbers in brackets show the amount of points before penalties or awarded points)
1	(United Kingdom) Emirates GBR	2	3	1	4	7	8	2	3	1	4	1	6	1	90
2	(Australia) Bonds Flying Roos	5	1	3	3	4	5	4	2	5	2	7	11	2	80
3	(New Zealand) Black Foils	1	4	8	2	5	2	1	4	2	8	2	9	3	84
4	(Spain) Los Gallos	4	2	7	5	1	1	6	6	3	5	5	10		77
5	France	DNS	DNS	6	6	3	3	10	1	6	7	6	3		69 (59)
6	(Canada) NorthStar	7	10	2	1	2	7	8	8	10	9	10	4		55
7	(Denmark) Rockwool Racing	6	5	4	12	12	6	7	7	7	6	4	1		48 (56)
8	Switzerland	8	7	5	10	6	9	3	12	9	3	11	8		41
9	Germany by Deutsche Bank	9	8	11	7	10	10	11	5	4	1	3	7		35 (47)
10	Red Bull Italy	11	6	9	8	8	11	5	10	9	11	12	2		31
11	Mubadala Brazil	10	9	10	11	9	4	8	DNS	8	12	9	12		16 (20)
12	United States	3	11	12	9	11	12	12	11	11	10	8	5		2 (20)
Citation:

Key
Colour	Result
1	Winner
2	Second place
3	Third place
4–12	Finish
DNF	Did not finish
DNS	Did not start
DSQ	Disqualified
WH	Withheld from racing
C	Race cancelled

Notes

- France SailGP Team were awarded five points in Season Championship for sitting out of Emirates Dubai Sail Grand Prix presented by P&O Marinas as build of 12th F50 is completed
- France SailGP Team were awarded five points in Season Championship for missing ITM New Zealand Sail Grand Prix | Auckland due to technical wingsail issue
- United States SailGP Team were penalised eight points in Season Championship for twelve-point penalty at KPMG Australia Sail Grand Prix | Sydney – breaking Rule 57 (Note: Rule 57 penalizes a team for causing damage to its F50 that was reasonable to avoid) during practice day transit
- Germany Deutsche Bank SailGP Team were penalised eight points in Season Championship for twelve-point penalty at KPMG Australia Sail Grand Prix | Sydney – collision with Red Bull Italy during practice racing
- Germany Deutsche Bank SailGP Team were penalised eight points in Season Championship for twelve-point penalty at KPMG Australia Sail Grand Prix | Sydney – collision with Mubadala Brazil during practice racing
- Mubadala Brazil SailGP Team were penalised four points in Season Championship for eight-point penalty at KPMG Australia Sail Grand Prix | Sydney – breaking Rule 57 during practice racing
- Germany Deutsche Bank SailGP Team were penalised four points in Season Championship for eight-point penalty at KPMG Australia Sail Grand Prix | Sydney – breaking Rule 57 during practice day transit (Note: Despite Germany SailGP Team having accumulated 20 penalty points during the Sydney event, SailGP docked 12 points from their season result. No explanation was given)
- Rockwool Racing SailGP Team were penalised eight points in Season Championship for twelve-point penalty at Rolex Los Angeles Sail Grand Prix – collision with a race mark during Race 1
- United States SailGP Team handed two season penalty points for four point penalty at Mubadala New York Sail Grand Prix - making contact with Rockwool Racing SailGP Team
- United States SailGP Team handed eight season penalty points for 12 point penalty at Germany Sail Grand Prix | Sassnitz - making contact with Emirates Great Britain during Fleet Race 4

== Impact League ==
As part of SailGP's sustainability initiatives, the championship runs a second leaderboard on which teams compete to have the greatest improvement in the sustainability of the sport. It encourages teams to implement sustainable practices and promote inclusivity within their organizations and communities. The league tracks teams' progress in areas such as carbon footprint reduction, gender equity, and youth engagement. The SailGP Impact League is a sustainability and inclusivity program within the global sailing league. Teams are externally audited after each round against 10 criteria, with the top three ranked teams awarded prize money to be donated to the teams' sustainability partners.New Zealand won the inaugural SailGP Impact League in 2022, followed by Rockwool Racing in 2023 and Emirates Great Britain in 2024.

=== Standings ===
Pos	Team		(United Arab Emirates) DUB	(New Zealand) AKL	(Australia) SYD	(United States) LA	RZW	(United States) SFN	(United States) NYC	AI	SCA	CA	BB	Points
1	(United Kingdom)	Emirates GBR	12	19	25	13	73	13	22	82	10	66	87	442
2	(Brazil)	Mubadala Brazil	11	23	22	6	75	11	21	73	10	64	91	427
3	(Canada)	NorthStar	15	23	26	12	66	13	22	79	10	70	61	417
4	(France)	France	13	24	25	14	58	12	24	58	10	60	71	389
5	(United States)	United States	11	22	20	13	53	14	24	75	10	60	63	385
6	(New Zealand)	Black Foils	13	23	22	15	60	14	23	61	10	69	39	369
7	(Switzerland)	Switzerland	12	23	26	13	56	14	23	69	10	50	47	361
8	(Germany)	Germany by Deutsche Bank	11	22	23	12	45	8	22	67	10	61	51	352
9	(Denmark)	Rockwool Racing	13	18	22	12	62	13	23	63	0	49	68	343
10	(Australia)	Bonds Flying Roos	12	22	21	12	65	13	18	58	10	39	37	327
11	(Italy)	Red Bull Italy	13	21	26	16	41	14	23	43	10	28	52	307
12	(Spain)	Los Gallos	14	23	26	14	47	11	26	52	10	37	46	306
Citation:
