= Sydney Sail Grand Prix =

SailGP sailing event

(Australia) Sydney Sail Grand Prix
Race information
- Times held: Port Jackson (7)
- First held: 2019
- Last held: 2026
- Most wins: Australia (3)

Last event (2024-25)

Final
- 1.: (United Kingdom) Emirates GBR
- 2.: (Canada) NorthStar
- 3.: (Australia) Bonds Flying Roos

The Sydney Sail Grand Prix (formerly the Australia Sail Grand Prix), officially the KPMG Sydney Sail Grand Prix, is a sailing event that is held in Sydney as part of the SailGP Championship. The event has been held annually since the inaugural season of SailGP in 2019. The event has been sailed on Port Jackson, Sydney every time it has been held.

== History ==
First announced in 2018 as the Sydney Sail Grand Prix, the Sydney Sail Grand Prix served as inaugural Grand Prix of SailGP. The event was the only Sail Grand Prix held in 2020, with the remainder of the season postponded until 2021 and results declared void as a result of the COVID-19 pandemic. The event was renamed the Australia Sail Grand Prix and re-held in 2021 serving as the second Sydney event as part of the season.

Following the announcement of the Perth Sail Grand Prix in 2025, the event was renamed again to the Sydney Sail Grand Prix.

== Winners of the Sydney Sail Grand Prix ==
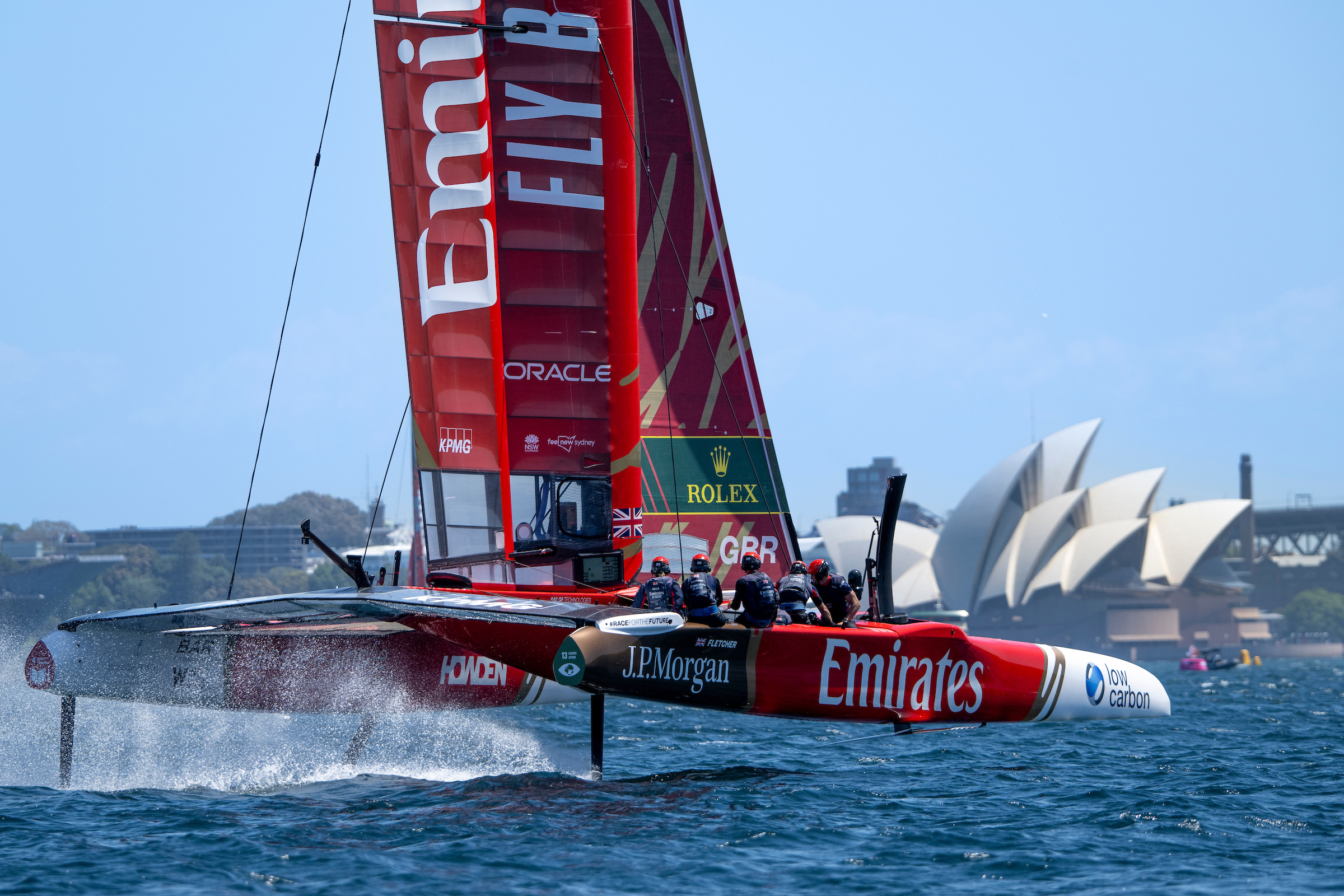
Emirates GBR in front of the Sydney Opera House during the 2024-2025 season of SailGP

=== Repeat winners ===
Wins	Driver	Years won
3	Australia	2019, 2021–22, 2023–24

=== By year ===
Year	Team
2019	Australia
2020	(United Kingdom) Great Britain (Note: The results of this event were declared void following the postponement of the remainder of the season.)
2021-22	Australia
2022-23	France
2023-24	Australia
2024-25	(United Kingdom) Great Britain
2026	United States
