= SailGP =

International sailing competition

Rolex SailGP Championship
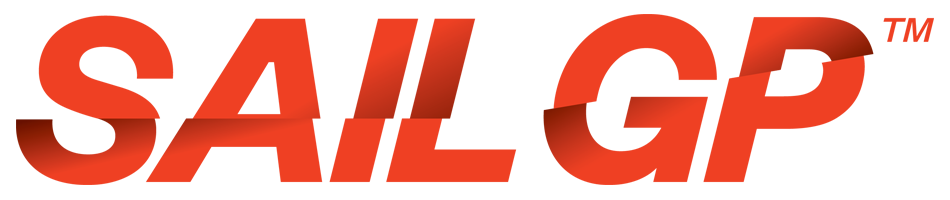
- SailGP logo
- Sport: Sailing fleet race
- Founded: 2018; 8 years ago
- Founder: Russell Coutts; Larry Ellison
- First season: 2019
- Owner: F50 League LLC
- CEO: Russell Coutts
- Motto: Powered by Nature
- No. of teams: 13
- Most recent champion: (United Kingdom) Emirates Great Britain SailGP Team (2024–25 SailGP championship)
- Most titles: (Australia) Bonds Flying Roos SailGP Team (3 titles)
- Sponsor: Rolex
- Website: Official website
- 2026 SailGP championship

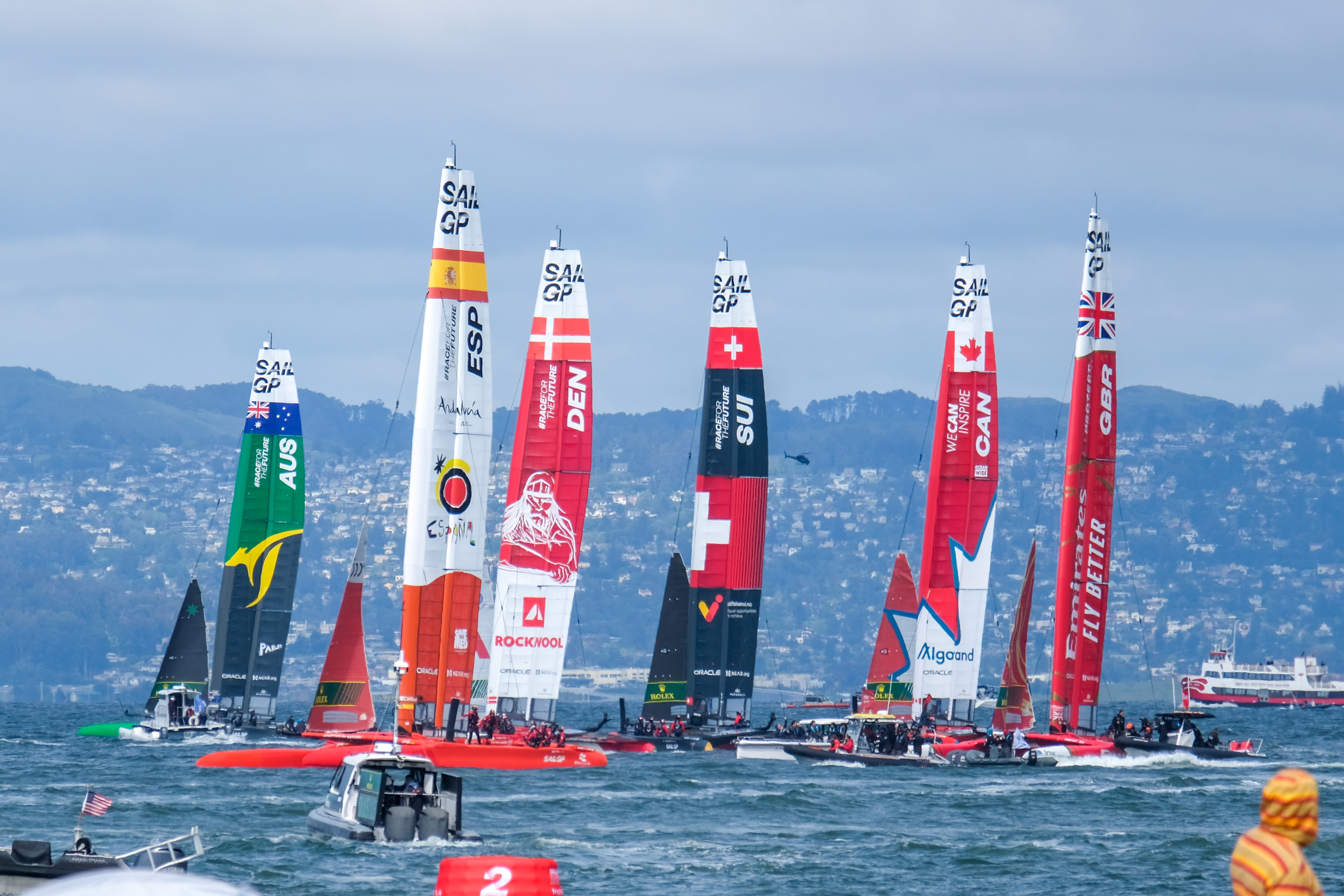
2022-23 season Grand Final in San Francisco.

SailGP, officially the Rolex SailGP Championship, is an annual international sailing competition featuring national teams racing identical high-performance F50 foiling catamarans. The series consists of multiple grands prix held at venues around the world, with teams earning points at each event toward an overall season championship. Races are designed to be short, fast-paced, and spectator-friendly, showcasing cutting-edge sailing technology and elite crews. Since its inaugural season in 2019, SailGP has become one of the leading professional sailing leagues, combining elements of sport, technology, and environmental sustainability initiatives. The reigning champions are Emirates GBR, winners of the 2024–25 SailGP championship.

== History ==
The competition was started in 2018 by Larry Ellison (co-founder of Oracle) and champion yachtsman Russell Coutts. They aimed to establish a commercially viable global sailing race series with a large audience, receiving initial funding from Ellison for five years (later extended to five seasons) to allow the competition to become self-sustaining. This had been unsuccessfully attempted in the past with events such as the Extreme Sailing Series. The SailGP format uses fast-foiling catamarans in a variety of locations. Many teams were initially owned by the competition, with the intention of becoming privately owned.

The first SailGP season took place in 2019 with six teams, taking place across four countries in a five grands prix season. The Australia SailGP Team went on to win that season's championship, helmed by Olympic gold medal winner Tom Slingsby. Australia went on to win the first three championships, becoming the most successful team in the sport.

In the 2023–2024 fourth season, the fleet grew to 10 teams, with five being privately owned. Two more teams were added for the 2024–2025 fifth season. Since June 2026 following SailGP's sale of the Black Foils all teams have been privately owned.

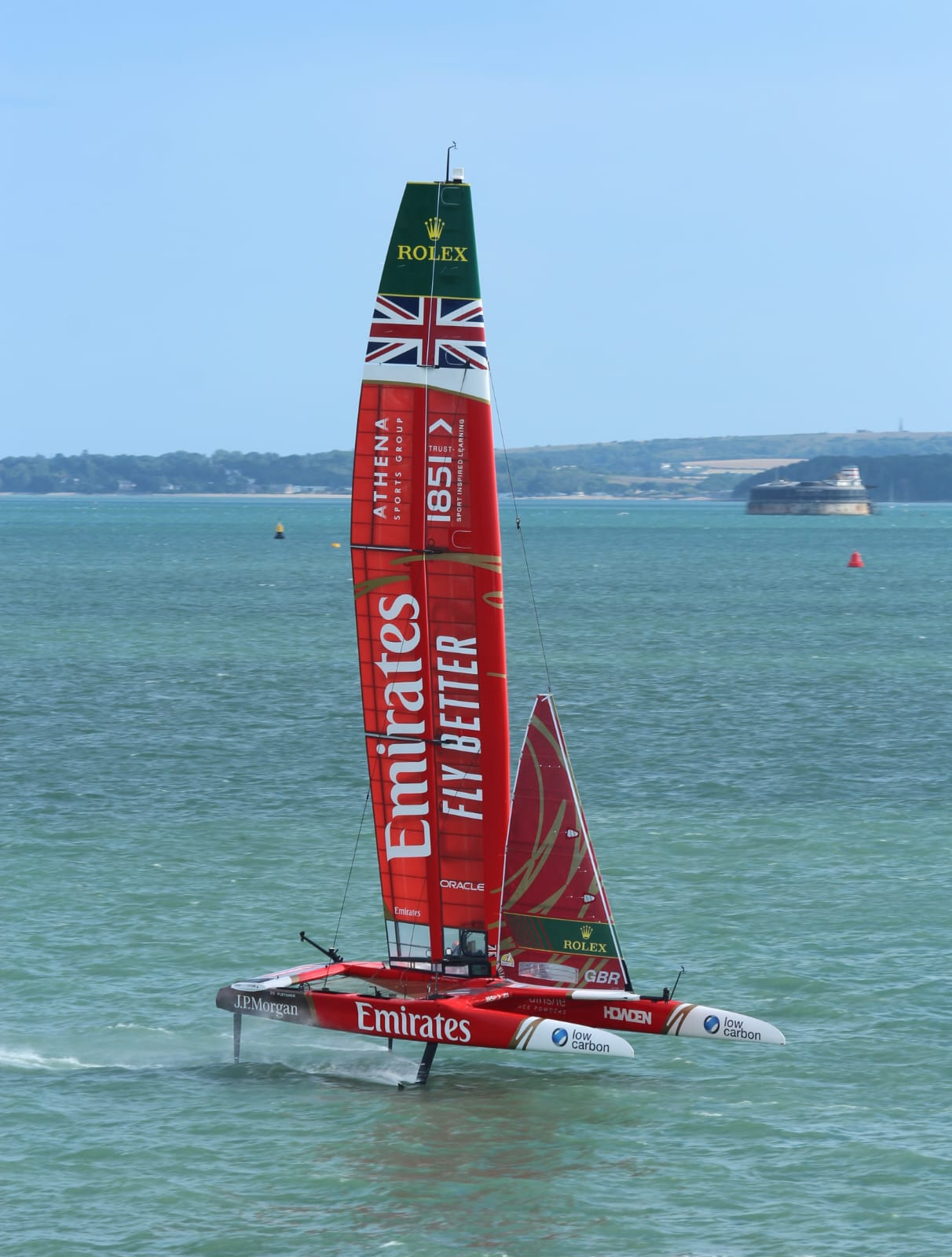
Current champions Great Britain at the 2025 event in Portsmouth

== Racing ==
The F50 boats used in the competition are one-design boats maintained and operated by SailGP. Technical information is also shared between teams, which includes large amounts of data collected using Oracle hardware and software systems. This is intended to prevent secret "arms races" that the organizers believe dominate the America's Cup and to ensure that the outcomes of races are determined by skill and ability, and not technology.

=== Event format ===
Each Sail Grand Prix is contested over two days and typically consists of a series of fleet races followed by an event or season final. Results from each event contribute to the overall season standings, which determine qualification for the season final.

==== Fleet races ====
Each SailGP event begins with a set of up-to seven fleet races, typically involving all competing teams racing simultaneously on a short, stadium-style course. These races determine the ranking of teams for progression into the event final and contribute to the season championship standings.

==== Event final ====
At the conclusion of the fleet races, the top teams on cumulative points advance to the event final. The event final is a winner-take-all race, usually contested by three teams, in which the event podium is decided irrespective of points earned earlier in the event.

==== Season final ====
The final race of the season is a winner takes all grand final race between the three highest-ranked crews on the season standings. The winner of the season final is crowned the overall season champion, regardless of cumulative points earned earlier in the season. During the inaugual SailGP championship, the event and season finals were raced as a match race between just the two highest-ranked teams.

=== Scoring System ===
During a season, teams are awarded both event points (following each race) and season points (at the end of each event). Since the 2024–2025 season, when the league exceeded ten teams for the first time, the points system has been updated to only award points to the top ten teams in both the event and season standings.

==== Scoring during events ====
1st	2nd	3rd	4th	5th	6th	7th	8th	9th	10th
10	9	8	7	6	5	4	3	2	1

For each of the up to seven fleet races during an event, points are awarded to the top ten finishers. The winning team in each race scores ten points, the second-place team scores nine points, and so on. Teams that place outside the top ten are not awarded points in the event leaderboard, meaning a team may score anywhere between 70 if they win first in seven races, or zero if they place outside the top ten in all races. In the event of a tie, the tie is broken by ordering the teams according to their placement in the most recent race. Even if a race is terminated, points can still be awarded as long as a boat has reached gate three.

The three highest-ranking teams in the event leaderboard qualify for the winner-takes-all event final.

==== Scoring during the season ====
Event Final			Event Leaderboard						
1st	2nd	3rd	4th	5th	6th	7th	8th	9th	10th
10	9	8	7	6	5	4	3	2	1

At the end of each event, the winner of the event final is awarded ten points in the season leaderboard, with second and third place receiving nine and eight points, respectively. Teams that did not qualify for the event final are awarded points corresponding to their rankings on the event leaderboard, with fourth-place scoring seven points, fifth-place scoring six points and so on. As with the race scoring, teams that place outside the top ten in the event receive no season points for that event.

Similar to how ties are broken on the event leaderboard, ties are broken by ordering the teams according to their placement in the event leaderboard of the most recent event.

The top three teams on the season leaderboard qualify for the winner-takes-all season Grand Final, which determines the final placement for those teams, while the remaining teams retain their season leaderboard placements.

==== Penalty Points ====
After the 2021 Bermuda Sail Grand Prix, additional penalty rules were put in place to discourage collisions on the race course. Boats that collide during an event accumulate contact and damage points, which may result in deductions from the season championship.

Penalty points can be awarded at an event (including before an event on training days), for any collision, depending on the severity of the collision. Penalty points are not awarded for other penalties such as on course side (OCS), overlapping, and not giving way.

Type of Collision	Boat Responsible	Boat Involved (where it was possible to avoid)
Collision	-4 points	-2 points (minimum)
Collision causing damage (Boat can continue racing)	-8 points	-4 points (minimum)
Collision causing serious damage (Boat unable to continue racing)	-12 points	-6 points (minimum)

Depending on the number of event penalty points that have been awarded, additional season penalty points may be awarded.

Penalty Points	Season Points Deduction
4	-2 points
5–8	-4 points
9–12	-8 points
13+	-12 points

== Teams ==
SailGP Teams
Team	Country	Seasons	Driver	Ownership	Championships
Bonds Flying Roos SailGP Team	Australia	2019–present	(Australia) Tom Slingsby	(Australia) Tom Slingsby (Australia) Hugh Jackman (United States) Ryan Reynolds	2019; 2022; 2023
NorthStar SailGP Team	Canada	2022–present	(United Kingdom) Giles Scott	(Canada) Dr Greg Bailey	
Rockwool Racing SailGP Team	Denmark	2021–present	(Denmark) Nicolai Sehested	(United States) Doug DeVos / American Magic	
DS Automobiles SailGP Team France	France	2019–present	(France) Quentin Delapierre	(United States) Ares SME Opps (United States) Sportsology Capital Partners (France) Kylian Mbappé	
Emirates Great Britain SailGP Team	United Kingdom	2019–present	(United Kingdom) Dylan Fletcher	(United Kingdom) Athena Racing (United Kingdom) Chris Bake	2025
Black Foils SailGP Team	New Zealand	2021–present	(New Zealand) Peter Burling	(United States) MSP Sports Capital	
Los Gallos SailGP Team	Spain	2021–present	(Spain) Diego Botín	(United Kingdom) Quantum Pacific Group	2024
Switzerland SailGP Team	Switzerland	2022–present	(Switzerland) Sébastien Schneiter	(Switzerland) Team Tilt (Switzerland) Firmenich Family	
United States SailGP Team	United States	2019–present	(United States) Taylor Canfield	(United States) Ryan McKillen	
Germany SailGP Team presented by Deutsche Bank	Germany	2023–present	(Germany) Erik Heil	(Germany) Sebastian Vettel (Germany) Thomas Riedel (Germany) Holger Hübner (Germany) Ralf Reichert (United States) Bolt Ventures (Hong Kong) Blue Pool Capital	
Mubadala Brazil SailGP Team	Brazil	2024–present	(Brazil) Martine Grael	(United Arab Emirates) Mubadala	
Red Bull Italy SailGP Team	Italy	2024–present	(New Zealand) Phil Robertson	(Australia) Jimmy Spithill (United States) Muse Capital + International Consortium	
Artemis SailGP Team	Sweden	2026–present	(Australia) Nathan Outteridge	(Sweden) Torbjörn Törnqvist	

Former SailGP Teams
Team	Country	Seasons
China SailGP Team	China	2019
Japan SailGP Team	Japan	2019–2022

== Grands Prix ==
Sail Grands Prix
Grand Prix	Location	Years	Events	Status	Commitment Ends
San Francisco Sail Grand Prix	San Francisco, United States	2019–2025	5		
Cowes Sail Grand Prix	(United Kingdom) Cowes, Great Britain	2019	1		
Marseille Sail Grand Prix	Marseille, France	2019	1		
Mubadala New York Sail Grand Prix	New York City, United States	2019, 2023–present	4	Current	2027
KPMG Sydney Sail Grand Prix	Sydney, Australia	2019–present	7	Current	
Apex Group Bermuda Sail Grand Prix	Bermuda	2021–2024, 2026–present	3	Current	2028
Italy Sail Grand Prix | Taranto	Taranto, Italy	2021, 2023	2		
Great Britain Sail Grand Prix | Plymouth	(United Kingdom) Plymouth, Great Britain	2021–2022	2		
Rockwool Denmark Sail Grand Prix | Aarhus	Aarhus, Denmark	2021	1		
France Sail Grand Prix | Saint-Tropez	Saint-Tropez, France	2021–present	4	Current	
DP World Spain Sail Grand Prix | Andalucía - Cádiz	Cádiz, Spain	2021–2025	4		
Rockwool Denmark Sail Grand Prix | Copenhagen	Copenhagen, Denmark	2022	1		
Emirates Dubai Sail Grand Prix presented by DP World	Dubai, United Arab Emirates	2022–present	3	Current	2027
Singapore Sail Grand Prix	Singapore	2022	1		
ITM New Zealand Sail Grand Prix | Christchurch	Christchurch, New Zealand	2022–2024	2		
T-Mobile United States Sail Grand Prix | Chicago at Navy Pier	Chicago, United States	2022–2023	2		
Oracle Los Angeles Sail Grand Prix	Los Angeles, United States	2023–2025	2		
Mubadala Abu Dhabi Sail Grand Prix presented by Abu Dhabi Sports Council	Abu Dhabi, United Arab Emirates	2023–present	2	Current	
Rockwool Canada Sail Grand Prix | Halifax	Halifax, Canada	2023, 2026–present	2	Current	
ITM New Zealand Sail Grand Prix | Auckland	Auckland, New Zealand	2025–present	2	Current	
Rolex Switzerland Sail Grand Prix | Geneva	Geneva, Switzerland	2025	1		
Enel Rio Sail Grand Prix	Rio de Janeiro, Brazil	2026–present	1	Current	2027
Oracle Perth Sail Grand Prix presented by KPMG	Perth, Australia	2026–present	1	Current	2028
Emirates Great Britain Sail Grand Prix	(United Kingdom) Portsmouth, Great Britain	2025–present	1	Current	2027
Germany Sail Grand Prix	Sassnitz, Germany	2025–present	1	Current	2027
Spain Sail Grand Prix | Valencia	Valencia, Spain	2026–present	0	Current	

== Trophy ==
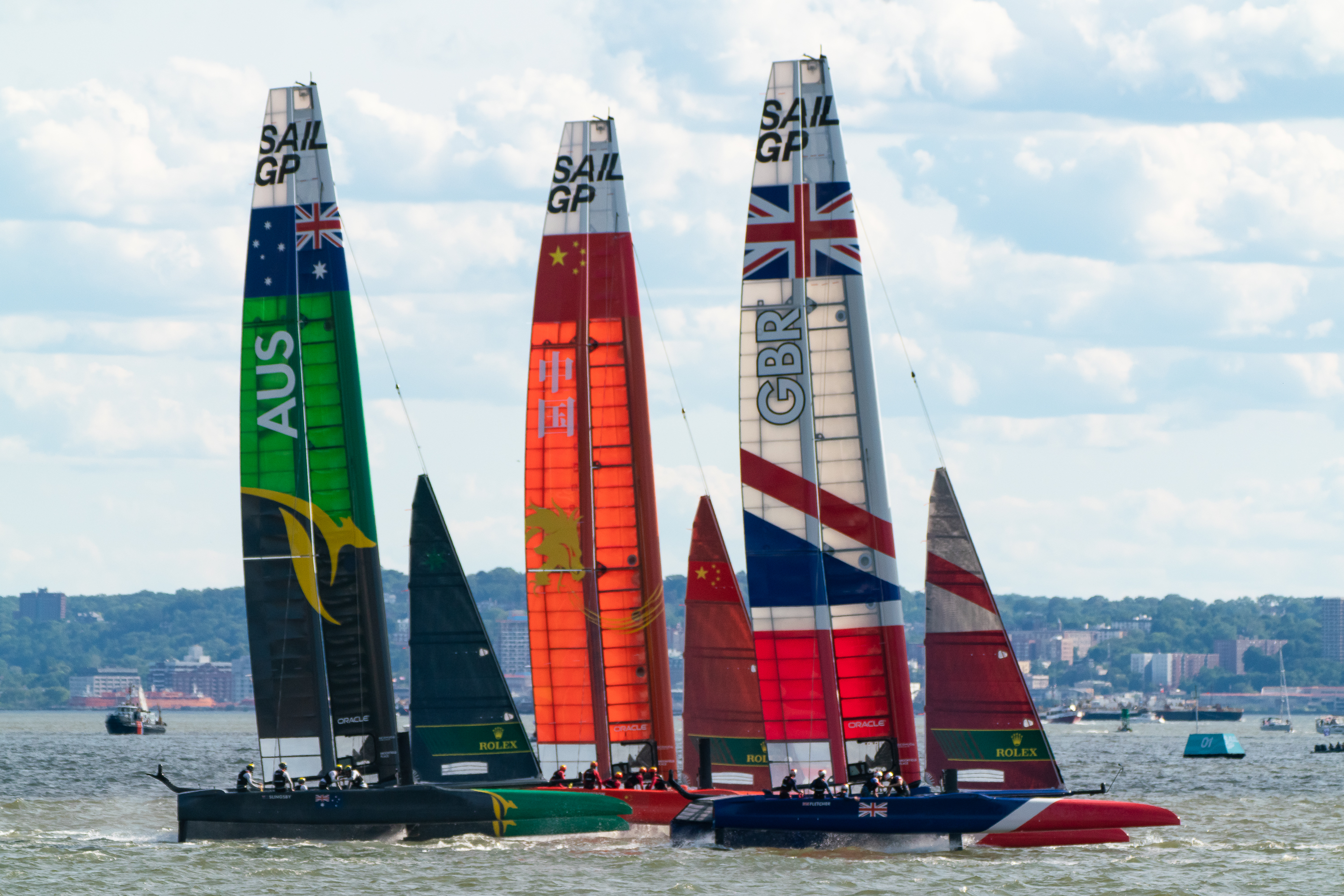
Australian, Chinese and British SailGP team in 2019

The SailGP trophy was unveiled in June 2019. The trophy, which stands at 65 cm in height and was crafted with 12.5 kg of sterling silver, was designed and made by Thomas Lyte, British silverware manufacturers. The trophy takes inspiration from the power of the wind and the speeds of the world's fastest sail racing boats.

== Crew Roles ==
=== Driver ===
The driver, or helm, is responsible for making decisions regarding the boat's course on the racecourse and communicating the plan to the crew. Additionally, many skippers, including the driver, are heavily involved in the logistics of the event.

=== Wing Trimmer ===
The wing trimmer is tasked with understanding how to generate and distribute power effectively on the boat. They have control over the wing's shape, influencing the boat's performance. The wing trimmer collaborates closely with the driver to optimize sailing modes for speed.

=== Flight Controller ===
The flight controller's primary responsibility is to maintain the boat's elevation, aiming to keep it airborne as much as possible. Any time the boat touches the water is considered a mistake by the flight controller. They work closely with the driver and wing trimmer to ensure the boat maintains its speed and stability.

=== Strategist ===
The strategist or tactician, positioned behind the driver, plays a role in analyzing data and providing strategic input. They are responsible for monitoring changing wind conditions, assisting in manoeuvres, and keeping a close watch on the fleet. With the introduction of a control panel and information display screen, the role of the strategist has become even more integral to sailing.

=== Grinder ===
Grinders are positioned at the front of the boat, with one facing forward and the other facing backward. They operate the winch handle to assist in trimming the wing sheet efficiently. This requires precision and coordination with the wing trimmer to deliver the necessary power.

== Past winners ==
Year	Winners	Runner-up	3rd place
2019	Australia; Tom Slingsby	Japan; Nathan Outteridge	China; Phil Robertson
2021–22	Australia; Tom Slingsby	Japan; Nathan Outteridge	United States; Jimmy Spithill
2022–23	Australia; Tom Slingsby	New Zealand; Peter Burling	(United Kingdom) Great Britain; Ben Ainslie
2023–24	Spain; Diego Botín	Australia; Tom Slingsby	New Zealand; Peter Burling
2024–25	(United Kingdom) Great Britain; Dylan Fletcher	Australia; Tom Slingsby	New Zealand; Peter Burling

== Seasons ==
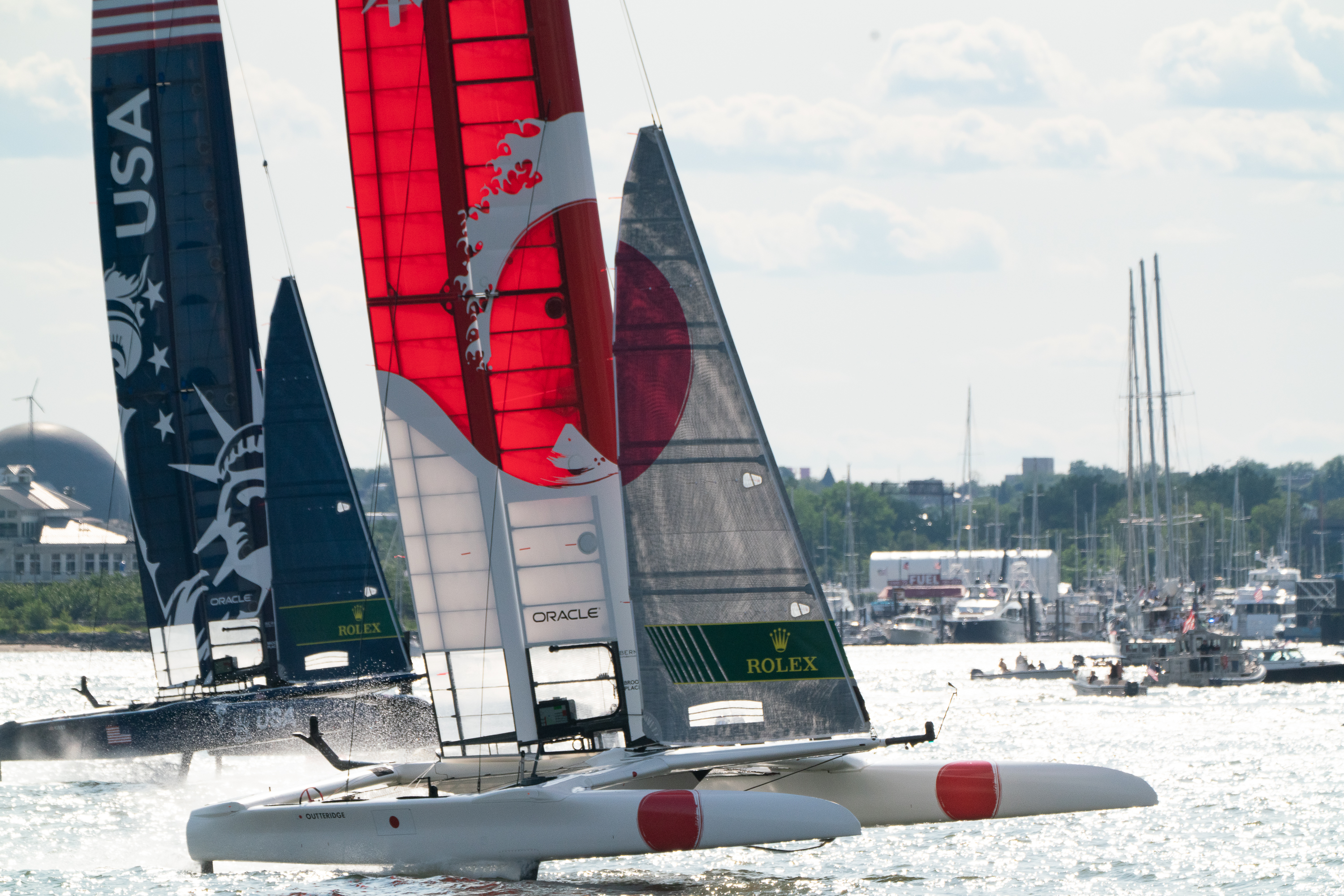
The F50s of the Japan and United States SailGP teams foiling in New York Harbour at the New York Sail Grand Prix – part of SailGP's inaugural 2019 season.

=== 2019 season ===
The inaugural competition was in 2019 with six teams competing from Australia, China, France, Great Britain, Japan, and the United States of America. The competition consisted of a circuit of five race meets in Sydney, San Francisco, New York, Cowes, and Marseille. The Australian team, skippered by Tom Slingsby, won the competition and the prize in a final match race against the Japanese team skippered by Nathan Outteridge.

Over the first season, SailGP attracted over 133,000 live spectators and had a television audience of 1.8 billion. The five races had a claimed economic benefit of US$115 million for their host cities.

=== 2021–22 season ===
Originally due to be contested in 2020, the season was postponed to 2021 after the first round in Sydney due to the ongoing COVID-19 pandemic, and was then extended into the early months of 2022.

The second season of SailGP introduced two new teams to the sport, with Spain replacing the Chinese team and Denmark joining as the 7th team. The British team changed as well, signing four-time Olympic Gold medalist and America's Cup skipper Ben Ainslie. The revamped team introduced members of the original British team and the America's Cup team Ineos Team UK.

This season was scheduled to visit the same venues of the first season but with Marseille swapped out for Copenhagen for the final venue, which coincided with the arrival of the new Danish team. The first round of the season began in Sydney, Australia. On the first day, Ben Ainslie and his British team won the first three races. On the second day of racing, Great Britain won a further race in the fleet races, with Australia taking the final fleet race. In the championship race, Great Britain beat the Australian team, winning them their first event title.

The second round of the 2020 SailGP race was due to be held in San Francisco, in May 2020, however SailGP suspended its season until 2021 due to the pandemic, with points from the Sydney race removed from the championship.

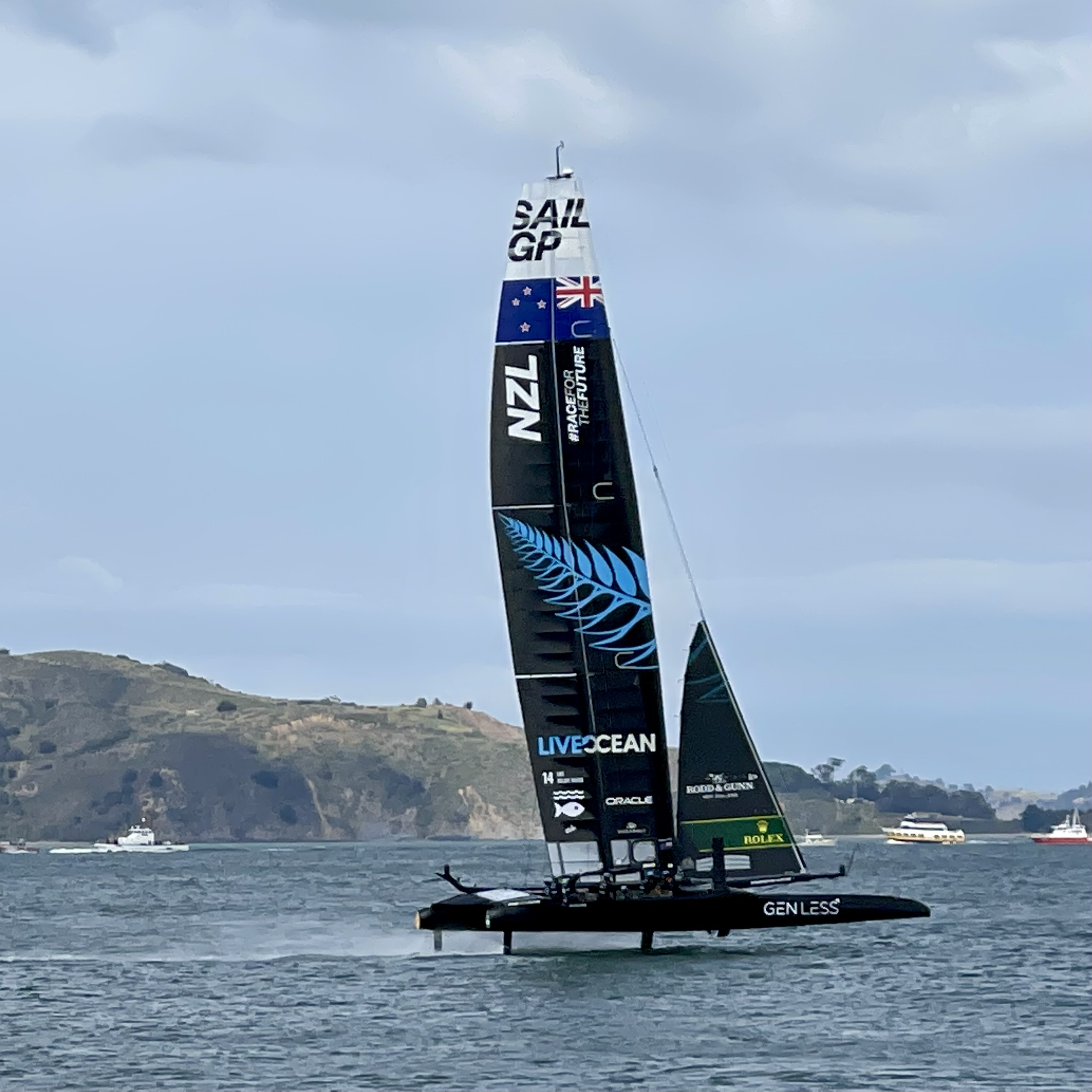
New Zealand SailGP Team competing in the United States Grand Prix in March 2022 on San Francisco Bay.

The 2021–22 SailGP championship saw the arrival of the New Zealand SailGP Team, skippered by two-time America's Cup winner and 49er gold medalist Peter Burling. The season commenced in April 2021 with the Bermuda Sail Grand Prix, which was won by Ben Ainslie's Great Britain SailGP team. Future venues include Taranto, Plymouth, Aarhus, Saint-Tropez, Cádiz, and Lyttelton Harbour, with the final venue being San Francisco.

Ultimately the season was won by the Australia SailGP team in the final race in San Francisco Bay.

=== 2022–23 season ===
The third season of SailGP again introduced two new teams to the sport, with Canada and Switzerland joining, and three new venues, with the additions of Dubai, Singapore, and New Zealand. The venue in Denmark was moved from Aarhus to Copenhagen and there were two venues in the United States: Chicago and San Francisco

=== 2023–24 season ===
The fourth season of SailGP intended to introduce a fan-owned team to the sport, representing Bermuda and the Caribbean, but funding considerations delayed their entry. A new team, representing Germany, was added as the tenth SailGP team. The new team is co-owned by Riedel Communications owner Thomas Riedel and former Formula One champion Sebastian Vettel.

=== 2024–25 season ===
The fifth season of SailGP includes new stops in Brazil, Germany, Switzerland, the United Arab Emirates (two stops), and a return to Great Britain, as well as the introduction of the new Mubadala Brazil SailGP Team as well as Red Bull Italy SailGP Team.

== Impact League ==
The SailGP Impact League is a sustainability and inclusivity program within the global sailing league. It encourages teams to implement sustainable practices and promote inclusivity within their organizations and communities. The league tracks teams' progress in areas such as carbon footprint reduction, gender equity, and youth engagement. Winning teams receive prize money to donate to their chosen charities, further amplifying their positive impact.

=== Past winners ===
Year	Winners	Runner-up	3rd place
2021–22	New Zealand	(United Kingdom) Emirates Great Britain	Australia
2022–23	Rockwool Denmark	New Zealand	(United Kingdom) Emirates Great Britain
2023–24	(United Kingdom) Emirates Great Britain	Rockwool Denmark	Switzerland
2024–25	(United Kingdom) Emirates Great Britain	Mubadala Brazil	(Canada) NorthStar
Citations:

== Inspire Program ==
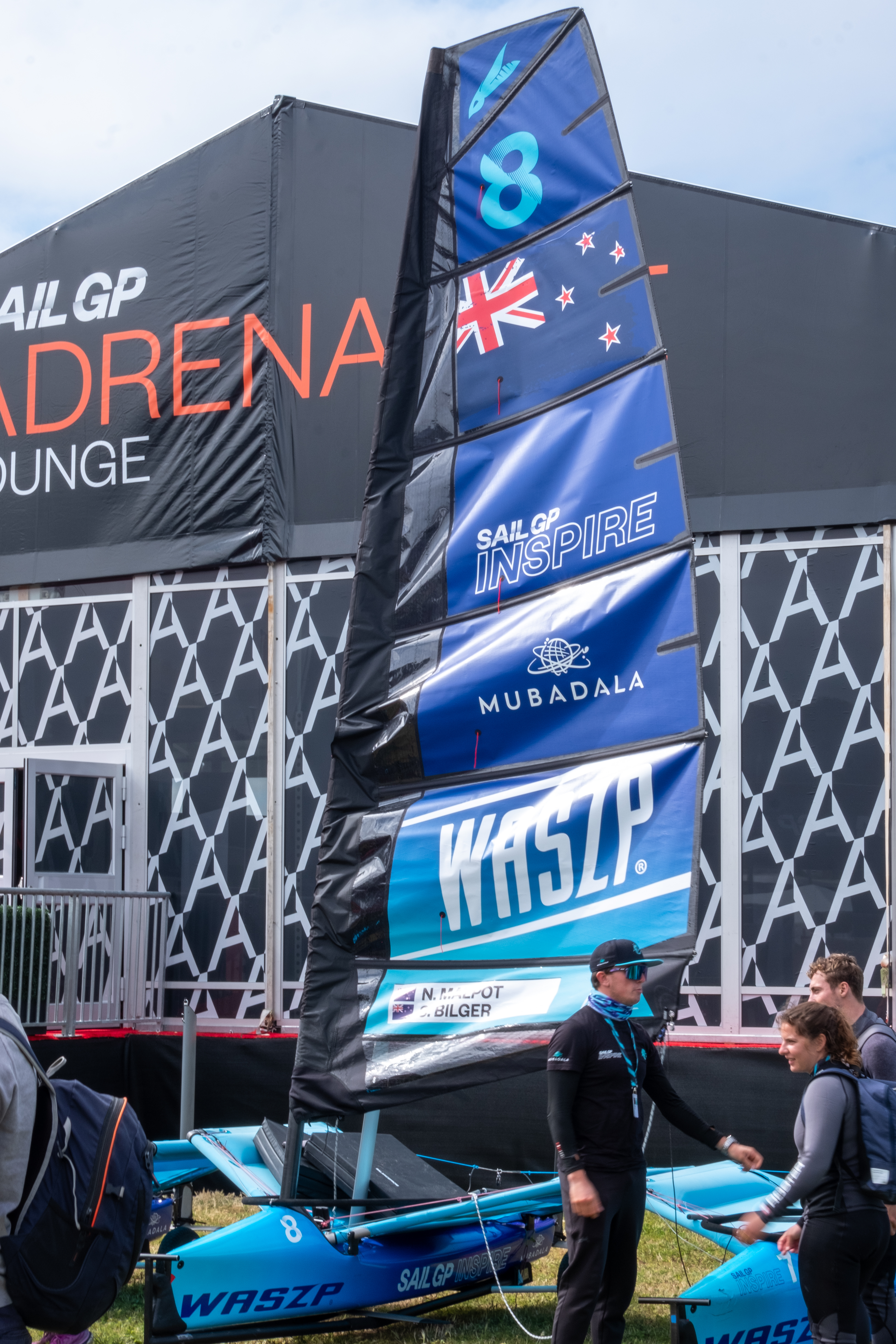
One of the Waszp sailboats used in the Inspire Series

=== Waszp ===
SailGP, in partnership with Waszp, created Inspire Racing to make foiling more accessible to young sailors, give them opportunity to experience a large sailing competition in all aspects, including racing in front of huge SailGP crowds.

==== Past Winners ====
Year	Winners	Runner-up	3rd place
2021–22	(New Zealand) Sean Herbert (United Kingdom) Hattie Rogers	(Spain) Jaime Framis Harguindey (Norway) Mathilde Robertstad	(Netherlands) Eliott Savelon (United States) Pearl Lattanzi
2022–23	(United States) Gavin Ball (New Zealand) Stella Bilger	(United Kingdom) Duncan Gregor (Bermuda) Rachael Betschart	(France) Hippolyte Gruet (Norway) Hedvig Doksrød
2023–24	(Denmark) Magnus Overbeck (Bermuda) Rachael Betschart	(United States) Thomas Sitzmann (Norway) Pia Henriette Brun Tveita	(France) Matthis Johnson (Australia) Bridget Conrad
Citations:

=== Wing Foiling ===
Since 2022, in partnership with Armstrong Foils, foil manufacturer and manufacturer of the F50s carbon fibre foil tips, the SailGP Wing Foiling program has given young wing foilers between 15 and 20 the opportunity to show off their skills in both course racing and freestyle foiling in front of Sail Grand Prix crowds.

== eSailGP ==
Starting 2019, SailGP also organized an Esports competition, known as eSailGP, which lasted three seasons.

== Sponsorship ==
SailGP is supported by a range of commercial partners at both series and team levels. Rolex serves as the title partner of the championship, which is officially known as the Rolex SailGP Championship.

The series has entered into partnerships with several multinational companies. Emirates signed a five-year agreement with SailGP in November 2024 under which it became the exclusive global airline partner and continued as a title partner for specific events, including the Emirates Dubai Sail Grand Prix and the Emirates Great Britain SailGP Team's home event in Portsmouth. DP World has been listed as a global series partner. In January 2026, Red Bull became a global partner of SailGP.
