= New Zealand Sail Grand Prix =

SailGP sailing event

(Australia) New Zealand Sail Grand Prix
Race information
- Times held: Christchurch (2); Auckland (2)
- First held: 2022
- Last held: 2026
- Most wins: (Australia) Bonds Flying Roos (2)

Last event (2026)

Final
- 1.: (Australia) Bonds Flying Roos
- 2.: (United Kingdom) Emirates GBR
- 3.: (Sweden) Artemis

The New Zealand Sail Grand Prix, officially the ITM New Zealand Sail Grand Prix, is a sailing event that is currently held in Auckland as part of the SailGP Championship. Since its inaugural event during the 2022–23 season, the event has been held annually; it has been held twice in Christchurch and twice in Auckland, with Australia most recently winning the event.

The 2026 edition took place in Auckland on 14–15 February.

== History ==
=== Christchurch ===
The New Zealand Sail Grand Prix was first announced at the start of 2021 set to be hosted at Lyttleton Harbour, Christchurch for the 2021-2022 championship, followed later that year by the announcement of an alternating four season hosting arrangement with two events scheduled for Auckland and two for Christchurch, including the one announced previously. The first event however was ultimately delayed as a result of the country's COVID-19 response, until the 2023-2024 season where it held the penultimate place on the schedule taking place on 18–19 March 2023.

During the 2024-2025 season the New Zealand SailGP event returned to Christchurch after it could not be hosted in Auckland where the city's Wynyard Point was not available for the event. Early in 2024, the Christchurch event was voted favourite amongst sailors. At the time, the event was the largest ever in SailGP history featuring 22,000 attendees over the weekend and generating NZ$33.7 million for the Canterbury region. Ultimately the decision was made for SailGP not to return to Christchurch after no racing took place on the first day of the event following Hector's Dolphins being spotted in the harbour.

=== Auckland ===
During the 2024–25 SailGP championship the New Zealand Grand Prix made its debut in Auckland at Wynyard Point, where the event had a financial impact of NZ$59.2m (US$35.9m) on the city. In mid-2025 it was announced that SailGP would return to Auckland for the 2026 season with a planned 30% increase to 10,236 seats which is expected to break the current SailGP spectator record, which including unticketed viewing is expected to top 30,000 over the weekend.

== Winners of the New Zealand Sail Grand Prix ==
=== By year ===
Year	Location	Team
2022–23	Christchurch	Canada
2023–24	Christchurch	(Australia) Black Foils
2024–25	Auckland	(Australia) Bonds Flying Roos
2026	Auckland	(Australia) Bonds Flying Roos
