= Utilita Arena =

Utilita Arena may refer to one of several indoor arenas in the United Kingdom which are, or have been, sponsored by Utilita Energy:

- Utilita Arena Birmingham (2020–)
- Utilita Arena Cardiff (2023–), best known as the Cardiff International Arena
- Utilita Arena Newcastle (2019–), unambiguously the Utilita Arena prior to 2020
- Utilita Arena Sheffield (2021–)

== See also ==
- Utilita Bowl (2024–)
- Utilita Energy Stadium (2019–2022)
