= Utilita Energy =

British electricity company

- Type: Private
- Industry: Electricity and gas
- Founded: 2003; 23 years ago in the United Kingdom
- Founder: Bill Bullen
- Headquarters: Eastleigh, United Kingdom
- Services: Pay-as-you-go metering
- Parent: Luxion Group
- Website: Official website

Utilita Energy is an electricity and gas supplier operating in the United Kingdom. Utilita began trading in 2003, specialising in pay-as-you-go metering.

As of January 2021, Utilita had over 800,000 customers, representing a 2.6% share in the domestic market.

== Company history ==
Utilita Energy began trading in 2003, as a challenger to the dominant "Big Six" energy suppliers. The company's founder and Chief Executive Officer is Bill Bullen. The company specialises in prepayment (pay-as-you-go) metering.

In 2005, Utilita became the first company in Great Britain to install a smart electricity meter in the residential sector, and in 2008 Utilita became the first to install a gas and electricity smart meter system.

By 2014, the company had 100,000 customers. In 2018, Utilita launched their energy management app, My Utilita.

In October 2020, Utilita agreed to pay £500,000 in compensation and refund the affected customers, after the company reported itself to industry regulator Ofgem. Almost 40,000 customers had been overcharged a total of £125,000 during 2019.

=== Energy Hubs ===
Utilita began a national rollout of high street Energy Hubs in 2018, allowing customers to top-up, check their account and get energy-saving advice in-store. As of October 2023, Utilita has Energy Hubs in Gosport, Southampton, Isle of Wight, Derby, West Bromwich, Edinburgh, Sheffield, Leicester, Derby and Hartlepool.

== Ownership ==
Utilita has a long-standing partnership with Secure Meters, an Indian supplier of smart meters. In 2017 it was reported that Secure Meters held roughly two-thirds of the company's shares, while Bill Bullen retained 20%. The registered offices of Luxion Group (previously Utilita Group), Utilita Energy and Secure Meters (UK) Ltd are in Chandler's Ford, Hampshire. Since December 2018, Bullen has had control of the group, although "a preferred supplier" has unexercised options giving it the potential to take control.

In addition to Utilita Energy, Luxion Group companies include Procode and Canary Care. In 2024, Procode acquired Trust Power, developer of the Loop home energy efficiency app. Trust Power was founded in 2016 by Roy Bedlow, a UK-based entrepreneur and founder of the renewable energy generation company Low Carbon.

== Sponsorships ==
Utilita is a longstanding sponsor of football clubs. The company was announced as the main shirt sponsor for Eastleigh F.C. (near Southampton) from the 2016–17 season, the biggest in the club's history. The sponsorship continued for a further four seasons.

In March 2018, Dundee United confirmed that Utilita would be their new shirt sponsor in a two-year deal from the 2018–19 season. A one-year extension was signed for the 2020–21 season. The deal ended after that season but the company became the sleeve sponsor for the club for the 2021–22 season.

In 2019, Utilita was announced as the shirt sponsor for Bristol Rovers on a one-year deal, which was extended for the 2020–21 season.

In July 2019, Utilita signed a deal with Scunthorpe United to become the shirt sponsor for the club for two seasons.

In August 2020, Brentford announced that Utilita would be the shirt sponsor for the 2020–21 season.

In March 2021, it was announced that Utilita would be the shirt sponsor for Huddersfield Town in a three-year deal starting with the 2021–22 season. In June 2021, Hibernian announced a two–year shirt sponsorship from the 2021–22 season.

Utilia sponsored The Football Yearbook (originally known as Rothmans' Football Yearbook) from its 52nd year, the 2021–22 season.

In February 2022, during the second half of the 2021–22 season, Luton Town announced that Utilita would become the main sponsor for the club, after having invested in the club since 2017. Utilita remain the club's main sponsor as of the 2023–24 season.

They became the home shirt sponsors of Blackpool for the 2022–23 season.

=== Arenas ===
In January 2019, it was announced that the company had acquired the naming rights for Newcastle Arena. In January 2020, the company announced it had also acquired the naming rights for Arena Birmingham. In September 2021, the company announced it had acquired the naming rights for Sheffield Arena. In August 2023, the company would add Cardiff International Arena to its naming rights portfolio.

The company also has the Utllita Bowl near Southampton (Utilita's head office).
