= Italy SailGP Team =

Italian sailing team

Red Bull Italy SailGP Team

Italy SailGP Team
- Established: 2024
- Top management: (Italy) Gian Luca Passi de Preposulo (Chairman) (Italy) Assia Grazioli-Venier (Board Director) (New Zealand) Jimmy Spithill (CEO)
- Driver: (New Zealand) Phil Robertson
- Wing Trimmer: (Australia) Kyle Langford
- Flight Controller: (Italy) Andrea Tesei
- Strategist: (Italy) Jana Germani
- Grinder: (Italy) Matteo Celon (Italy) Enrico Voltolini

SailGP Career
- First Entry: 2024 Dubai Sail Grand Prix
- SailGP Championships: 0
- Website: sailgp.com/teams/red-bull-italy/

Red Bull Italy SailGP Team, is an Italian SailGP team that was founded in 2024. The team was co-founded by yachtsman Jimmy Spithill.

The investor consortium has been led since 2025 by venture capitalist Assia Grazioli-Venier, founder of Muse Capital and Muse Sport, alongside Gian Luca Passi de Preposulo, founder of Festina Lente Capital. They are joined by investors and supporters including MFO Certuity, Yeh Capital, Academy Award-winning actress Anne Hathaway and her husband, actor Adam Shulman, British entrepreneur Alexander Gilkes of Squared Circles, Evan Yurman, Italian actress and former Miss Italia Miriam Leone, as well as prominent figures from the worlds of business and sport including Julie Eddleman, Heather Karatz, Peter Delgrosso and U.S. physician and television personality Jennifer Ashton.

== Results ==
Season	Driver	Position
2024-25	(Italy) Ruggero Tita	10th
2026	(New Zealand) Phil Robertson	
