= Germany SailGP Team =

German sailing team

Germany SailGP Team presented by Deutsche Bank
Germany SailGP Team
- Esablished: 2023
- CEO: (Germany) Tim Krieglstein
- Driver: (Germany) Erik Heil
- Wing Trimmer: (Germany) Stuart Bithell
- Flight Controller: (Australia) James Wierzbowski
- Strategist: (Germany) Anna Barth
- Grinder: (Germany) Felix van den Hövel (Germany) Jonathan Knottnerus-Meyer

SailGP Career
- First Entry: 2023-24 United States Sail Grand Prix
- SailGP Championships: 0
- Website: sailgp.com/teams/germany

Germany SailGP Team presented by Deutsche Bank, is a German SailGP team that was founded in 2023. The team's CEO is Tim Krieglstein, and the team is supported by former F1 driver Sebastian Vettel and team driver Erik Heil.

== Results ==
Season	Driver	Position
2023-24	(Germany) Erik Heil	9th
2024-25	(Germany) Erik Heil	9th
2026	(Germany) Erik Heil	
