= Assia Grazioli-Venier =

Italian American venture capitalist

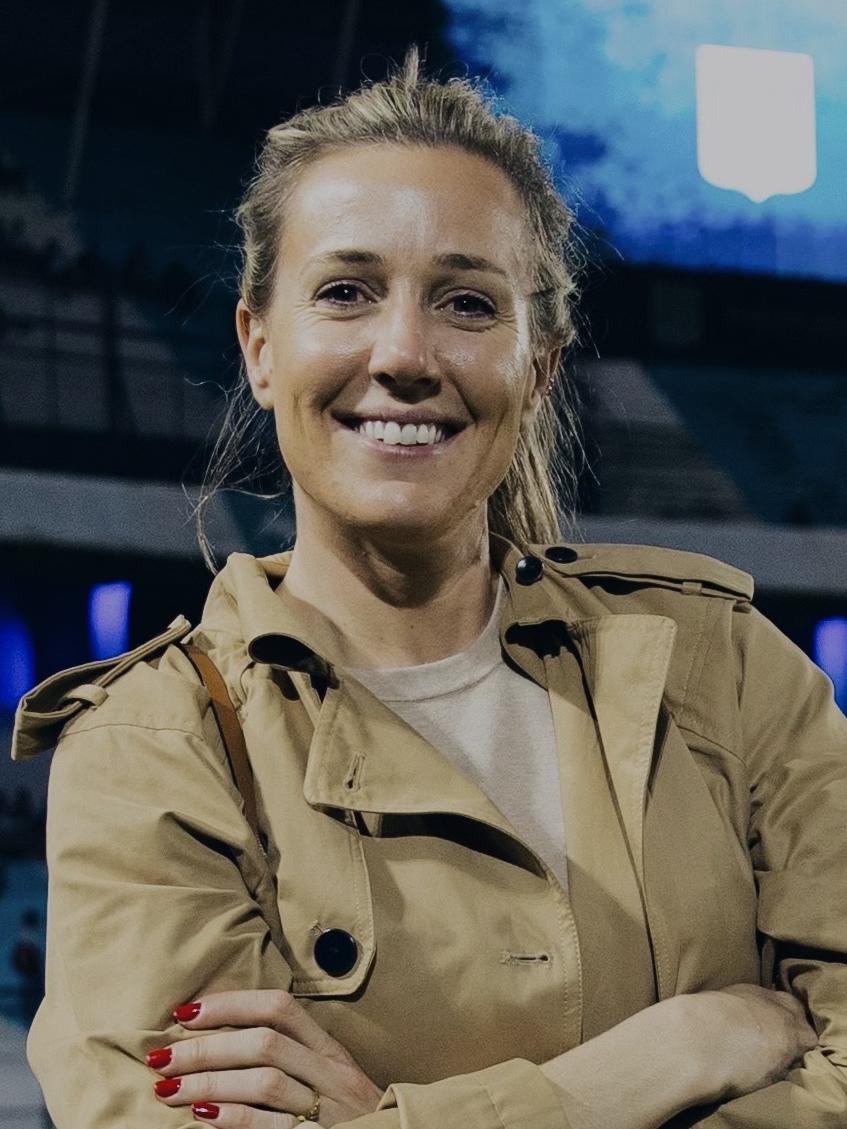
- Assia in 2019
- Born: July 31, 1980 (age 46); Rome, Italy
- Occupations: Venture Capitalist, Businessperson, and Media Executive

Assia Grazioli-Venier (born 31 July 1980) is a venture capitalist, businessperson, and media executive. She was born in Rome and raised in New York City and known for her contributions to the commercialization of women's sports, consumer technology and the advancement of women's healthcare.

== Career ==
She is a co-founding partner of Muse Capital, an early-stage venture capital fund investing in consumer technology. She opened the fund in 2016 with her business partner Rachel Springate to support the growth of companies especially investing in diversity, social good and long-term profits. Muse Capital's portfolio includes companies like Midi, Beekeepers and Wonderworks.

She is a cancer survivor and was diagnosed with breast cancer at 35.

She leads Muse Capital's sports investment and advisory portfolio, Muse Sport, which includes the Washington Spirit, Therabody, Just Women's Sports, Italy SailGP Team, and the Angela Ruggiero-founded Sports Innovation Lab.

== Roles and appointments ==
Media Executive

She served as the Director of Special Projects at Spotify during company's early growth. As advisor to Ministry of Sound, she created the multimedia entertainment business's Digital TV and Radio channels.

Founding Companies

Before launching Muse Capital, she founded Flypaper Media, Music & Management (2009–2014) and served as its CEO. She is also the co-founding partner of Muse Capital where she focuses on high-growth consumer tech startups, entertainment companies, and sports businesses.

Board Member

In 2012, Grazioli-Venier is the first woman and youngest board member of Italy's Juventus football club, where she served a full nine-year term. Juventus Women was launched in 2017. She has also served on the board of directors for the Washington Spirit and Marquee Raine Acquisition Corp.

Assia was also on the board of advisors of Northzone from 2015 to 2017, whose portfolio includes Spotify & Kahoot.

== Recognition ==
In 2023, Grazioli-Venier was named a Top VC Investor in Sports Startups by Business Insider. She was also recognized by Sports Business Journal as a co-recipient of the sports 2023 Deal of the Year on stage at the SBJ Sports Business Awards in New York for her role in businesswoman Michele Kang's acquisition of women's soccer team, The Washington Spirit, which competes in the National Women's Soccer League.
