= Brazil SailGP Team =

Brazilian sailing team

Mubadala Brazil SailGP Team
Brazil SailGP Team
- Esablished: 2024
- Driver: (Brazil) Martine Grael
- Wing Trimmer: (United Kingdom) Leigh McMillan
- Flight Controller: (New Zealand) Andy Maloney
- Strategist: (United Kingdom) Paul Goodison
- Grinder: (Brazil) Marco Grael (Brazil) Mateus Isaac

SailGP Career
- First Entry: 2024-25 Dubai Sail Grand Prix
- SailGP Championships: 0
- Website: sailgp.com/teams/mubadala-brazil

Mubadala Brazil SailGP Team is a Brazilian sailing team that competes in the SailGP championship, with the 2024-25 season being their first. They are the first South American team in the competition and the first to be led by a female driver in Olympian Martine Grael.
