= 2019 Sydney Sail Grand Prix =

Round 1 of SailGP Season 1

(Australia) 2019 Sydney Sail Grand Prix
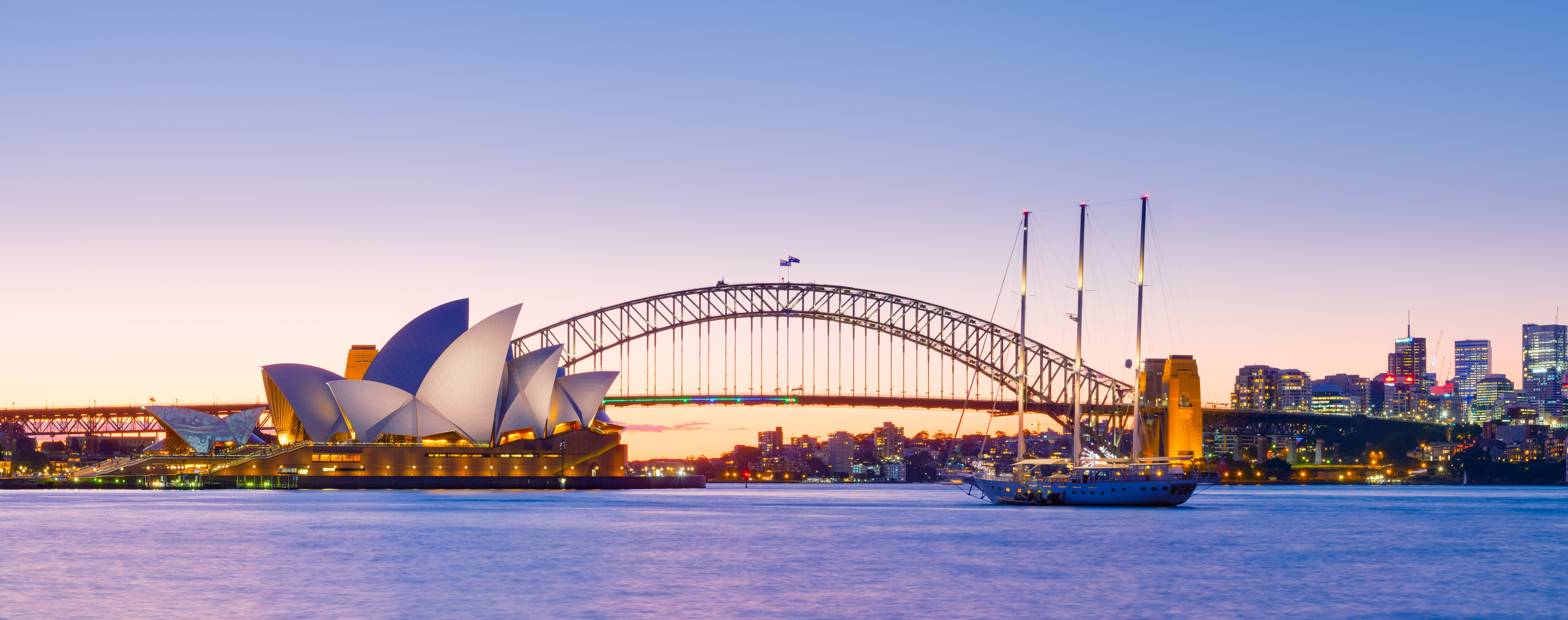
- Sydney Harbour, where the event was held

Event details
- Date: February 15–16, 2019
- Official name: 2019 Sydney Sail Grand Prix
- Location: Sydney Harbour, Sydney, Australia
- Weather: Clear

Grand Final
- First: Australia SailGP Team
- Second: Japan SailGP Team

The 2019 Sydney Sail Grand Prix was the first event of the inaugural SailGP season and took place between 15 and 16 February 2019 at Port Jackson in Sydney, Australia. The event consisted of five races excluding one Grand Final where the top two teams from the fleet racing, Australia and Japan, match raced for the event win.

== Results ==
Pos	Team	1	2	3	4	5	F
1	Australia	4	1	1	1	1	1
2	Japan	1	2	2	2	3	2
3	(United Kingdom) Great Britain	3	4	4	3	5	
4	China	2	6	6	6	2	
5	France	DNF	5	3	4	4	
6	United States	5	3	5	5	6	
