= Great Britain SailGP Team =

British sailing team

(United Kingdom) Emirates Great Britain SailGP Team
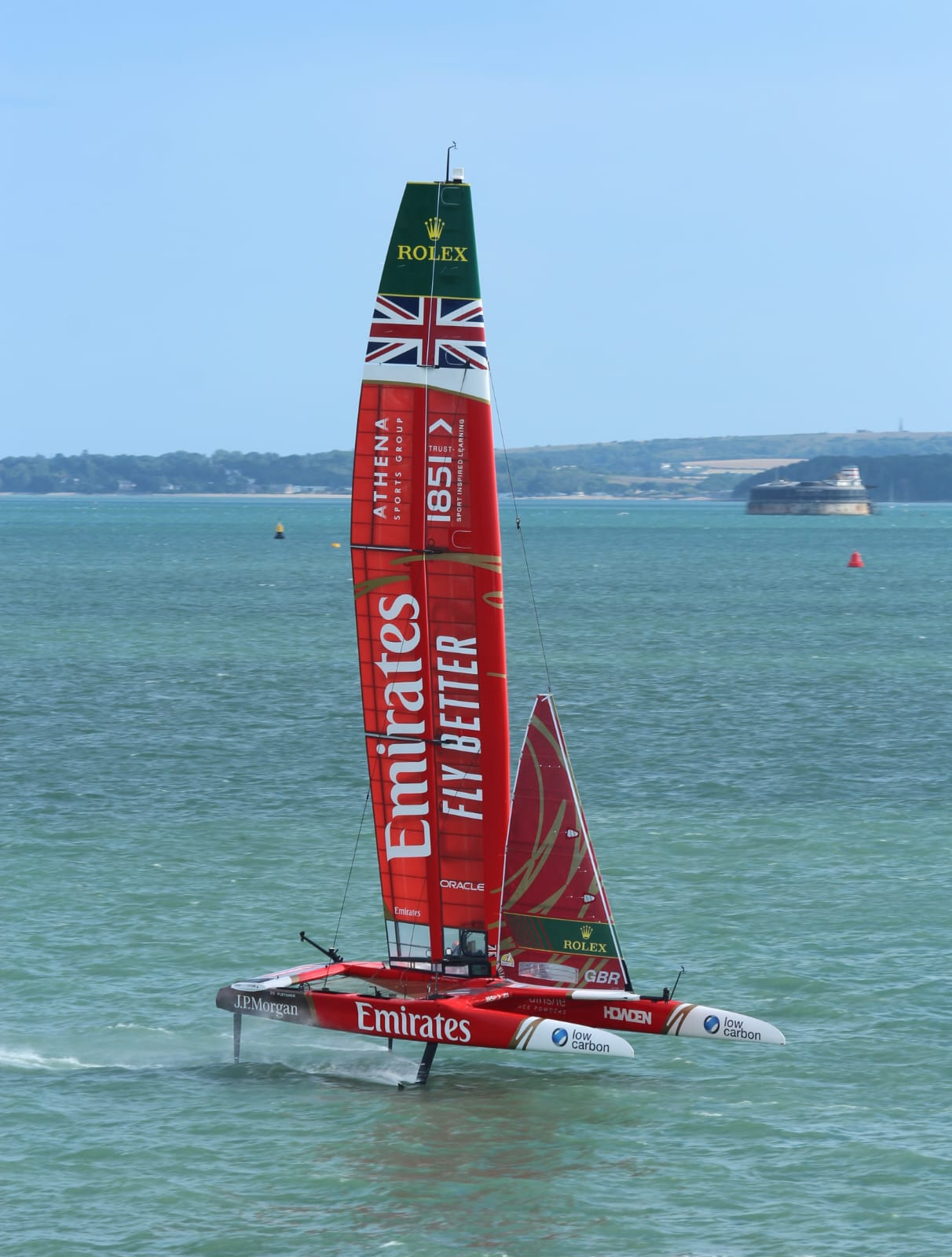

Emirates Great Britain SailGP Team
- Esablished: 2019
- CEO: (United Kingdom) Ben Ainslie
- Driver: (United Kingdom) Dylan Fletcher
- Wing Trimmer: (Australia) Iain Jensen
- Flight Controller: (Australia) Luke Parkinson
- Strategist: (United Kingdom) Hannah Mills
- Grinder: (United Kingdom) Nick Hutton (United Kingdom) Neil Hunter

SailGP Career
- First Entry: 2019 Sydney Sail Grand Prix
- 1 (2024-2025)
- Website: sailgp.com/teams/emirates-great-britain

Emirates Great Britain SailGP Team is a British sailing team led by Sir Ben Ainslie which participates in SailGP. Known as Emirates GBR, they have won six Sail Grand Prix events since the competition was formed in 2019, and are the 2024-2025 season champions. Off the water, they are the current Impact League Champions for their environmental and social inclusion commitments.

== History ==
The Great Britain SailGP Team was formed in 2019 by F50 League LLC as a part of the inaugural season of the SailGP competition.

The driver for Season 1 was Olympic gold medallist Dylan Fletcher, with the team finishing the season in 4th place overall.

Sir Ben Ainslie joined the team at the start of Season 2 as CEO and driver, winning their first event in Sydney, followed by victory in Bermuda and two further podium finishes in Aarhus, Denmark, and Cádiz, Spain. The British team ended the season in 4th place overall. The season also saw Ben Ainslie become the first SailGP team to evolve into a third-party owned franchise by taking majority ownership of the team through an investment from businessman Chris Bake. Larry Ellison’s Oracle Racing Inc. retains a minority equity stake in the team.

Season 3 was the most successful for the British team, with five event podium finishes and reaching the Season Final, securing third place overall.

Season 4 was one of change, with Ben Ainslie starting in the driver position and securing two event wins in Saint-Tropez, France, and Taranto, Italy, before handing over the wheel to fellow British Olympic gold medallist Giles Scott, who, after a difficult start, went on to secure a Grand Prix event victory in Halifax, Canada. The team finished the season in 5th place.

Dylan Fletcher returned to the driver position for the Great Britain SailGP Team in the 2025 SailGP Season, replacing Giles Scott, who joined the Canada SailGP Team in SailGP’s first-ever transfer deal. Fletcher started the season in fine form, achieving podium finishes at the opening three Grand Prix events, including a win in Sydney. At the 2025 Abu Dhabi grand final, the team became the first in SailGP history to be double crowned winning both the season championship and impact league.

== Team ==
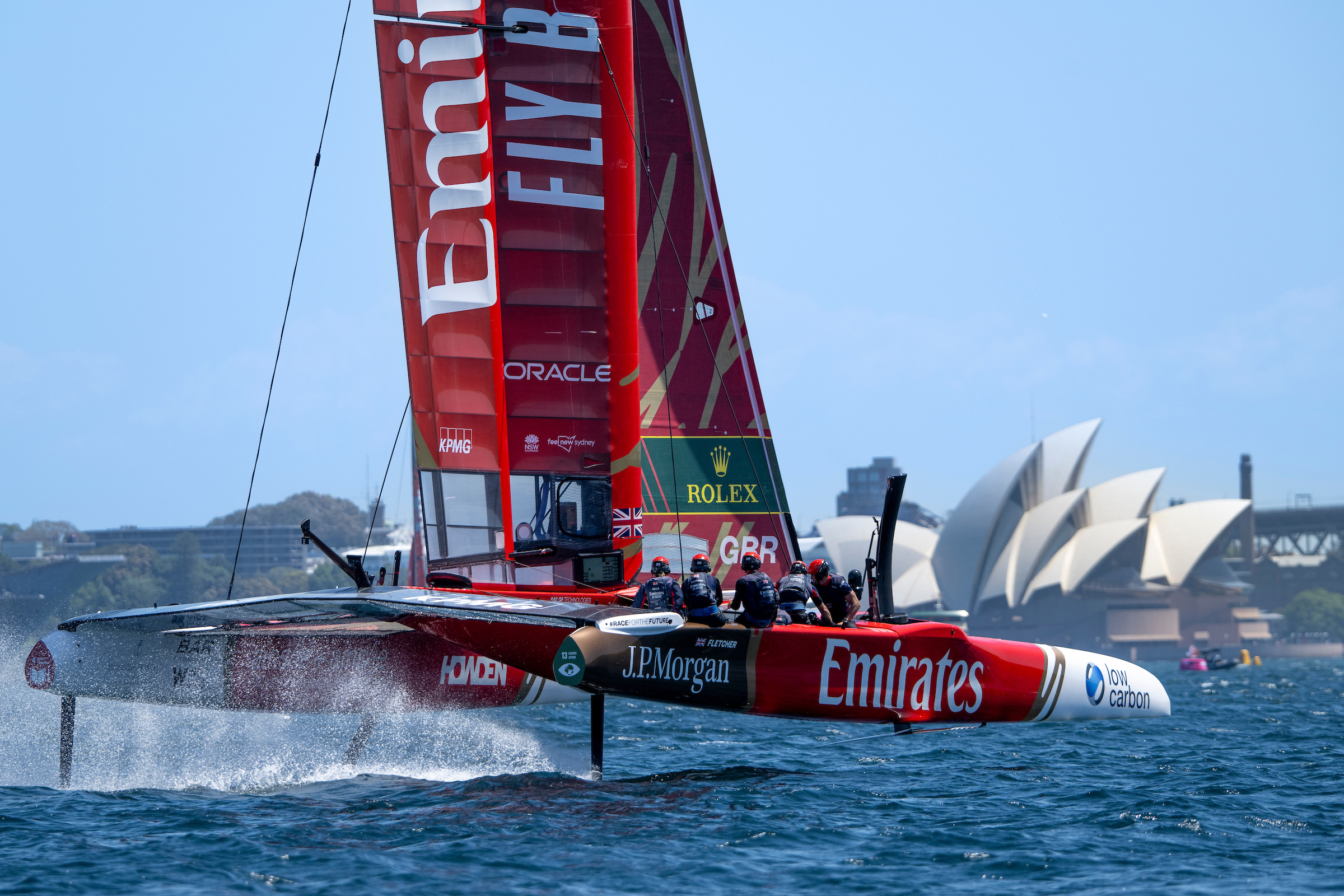
Emirates GBR at Sydney

Emirates GBR is led by Sir Ben Ainslie, as CEO and Owner. The team’s F50 is driven by Olympic gold medallist, former Moth World Champion, and America's Cup helm, Dylan Fletcher.

The crew alongside Fletcher features sailing’s top talent, including Olympic champions Hannah Mills and Iain Jensen, and America's Cup athletes Neil Hunter, Nick Hutton, Luke Parkinson, and Ben Cornish.

Paris 2024 Olympic gold medallist Ellie Aldridge and Kai Hockley, a 19-year-old from Tottenham, London, complete the squad as development sailors who are part of the team's Athena Pathway programme.

In Season 4, Emirates GBR won three events and the Impact League for its dedication to climate education, sustainability, and inclusivity, in partnership with the 1851 Trust, Low Carbon, the renewable energy company founded by Roy Bedlow, and Athena Pathway.

== Results ==
=== Season 1 ===
Location	Event Result	Race 1	Race 2	Race 3	Race 4	Race 5	Race 6	Final
(Australia) Sydney	3rd	3rd	4th	4th	3rd	5th	–	–
(United States) San Francisco	3rd	3rd	4th	2nd	1st	2nd	–	–
(United States) New York City	6th	6th	6th	6th	3rd	4th	–	–
(United Kingdom) Cowes	6th	5th	6th	1st	6th	–	–	–
(France) Marseille		3rd	2nd	3rd	6th	4th	6th	–
Season Result	4th							
Citations:

=== Season 2 ===
Location	Event Result	Race 1	Race 2	Race 3	Race 4	Race 5	Final
Bermuda	1st	7th	7th	2nd	1st	2nd	1st
(Italy) Taranto	6th	6th	3rd	7th	6th	4th	–
(United Kingdom) Plymouth	4th	8th	7th	2nd	3rd	1st	–
(Denmark) Arhus	3rd	4th	5th	1st	4th	2nd	3rd
(France) Saint Tropez	7th	1st	5th	8th	3rd	5th	–
(Spain) Cádiz	3rd	1st	7th	4th	2nd	2nd	3rd
(Australia) Sydney	8th	2nd	4th	8th	8th	8th	–
(United States) San Francisco	2nd	1st	6th	4th	3rd	2nd	–
Season Result	4th						
Citations:

=== Season 3 ===
Location	Event Result	Race 1	Race 2	Race 3	Race 4	Race 5	Race 6	Final
Bermuda	2nd	1st	8th	1st	5th	4th	–	2nd
(United States) Chicago	3rd	2nd	3rd	2nd	3rd	5th	–	3rd
(United Kingdom) Plymouth	4th	4th	4th	6th	4th	4th	–	–
(Denmark) Copenhagen	9th	–	–	–	–	–	–	–
(France) Saint Tropez	3rd	2nd	9th	4th	3rd	–	–	3rd
(Spain) Cádiz	5th	8th	2nd	1st	3rd	9th	–	–
(United Arab Emirates) Dubai	3rd	6th	1st	1st	2nd	3rd	4th	3rd
Singapore	5th	5th	3rd	5th	5th	–	–	–
(Australia) Sydney	4th	6th	6th	2nd	–	–	–	–
(New Zealand) Christchurch	4th	3rd	4th	3rd	4th	6th	–	–
(United States) San Francisco	2nd	2nd	1st	2nd	4th	5th	–	–
Season Result	3rd							
Citations:

=== Season 4 ===
Location	Event Result	Race 1	Race 2	Race 3	Race 4	Race 5	Final
(United States) Chicago	7th	2nd	7th	8th	6th	10th	–
(United States) Los Angeles	6th	2nd	6th	1st	10th	8th	–
(France) Saint-Tropez	1st	2nd	8th	3rd	1st	3rd	1st
(Italy) Taranto	1st	2nd	2nd	3rd	1st	2nd	1st
(Spain) Cádiz	8th	8th	10th	6th	7th	6th	–
(United Arab Emirates) Dubai	5th	5th	7th	1st	1st	10th	–
(United Arab Emirates) Abu Dhabi	8th	7th	7th	7th	5th	4th	–
(Australia) Sydney	7th	9th	6th	7th	6th	5th	–
(New Zealand) Christchurch	7th	4th	3rd	8th	–	–	–
Bermuda	8th	8th	5th	5th	7th	7th	–
(Canada) Halifax	1st	3rd	5th	2nd	3rd	2nd	1st
(United States) New York	3rd	1st	7th	2nd	5th	–	3rd
(United States) San Francisco	3rd	6th	2nd	2nd	5th	5th	–
Season Result	5th						
Citations:

=== Season 5 ===
Location	Event Result	Race 1	Race 2	Race 3	Race 4	Race 5	Race 6	Race 7	Final
(United Arab Emirates) Dubai	2nd	5th	8th	2nd	3rd	3rd	–	–	2nd
(New Zealand) Auckland	3rd	1st	2nd	9th	4th	9th	4th	6th	3rd
(Australia) Sydney	1st	5th	1st	3rd	3rd	1st	6th	7th	2nd
(United States) Los Angeles	4th	4th	4th	8th	7th	1st	6th	1st	4th
(United States) San Francisco	7th	8th	2nd	4th	11th	11th	7th	6th	7th
(United States) New York City	8th	11th	6th	9th	10th	3rd	3rd	-	8th
(United Kingdom) Portsmouth	2nd								
(Germany) Sassnitz									
(Italy) Taranto									
(Switzerland) Geneva									
(Spain) Cádiz									
TBA									
(United Arab Emirates) Abu Dhabi									
Season Result	2nd after five events								
Citations:
