= Quentin Delapierre =

French sailor

Personal information
- Nationality: French
- Born: 17 July 1992 (age 34) Vannes, France

Sport
- Sport: Sailing

Quentin Delapierre (born 17 July 1992) is a French sailor. He is the current driver for DS Automobiles SailGP Team France.

== Sailing career ==
Onboard Lorina Limonade Golfe du Morbihan, Delapierre has twice won the Diam 24 class Tour de France à la voile (2016 and 2018).

Delapierre has competed in the Nacra 17 class alongside fellow French sailor Manon Audinet. The pair received silver at the Nacra 17 European Championships in 2020 on Lake Attersee and finishing 8th out of 20 in the mixed Nacra 17 event in Tokyo at the 2020 Summer Olympics.

At the 2021–22 SailGP championship, he replaced Billy Besson as driver of France SailGP Team.

In August 2023, he trained aboard the AC40 as one of the two helmsmen of the French Orient Express Racing Team challenge for the preliminary regattas at the 37th America's Cup.
