= Roy Bedlow =

British entrepreneur and business leader (born 1968)

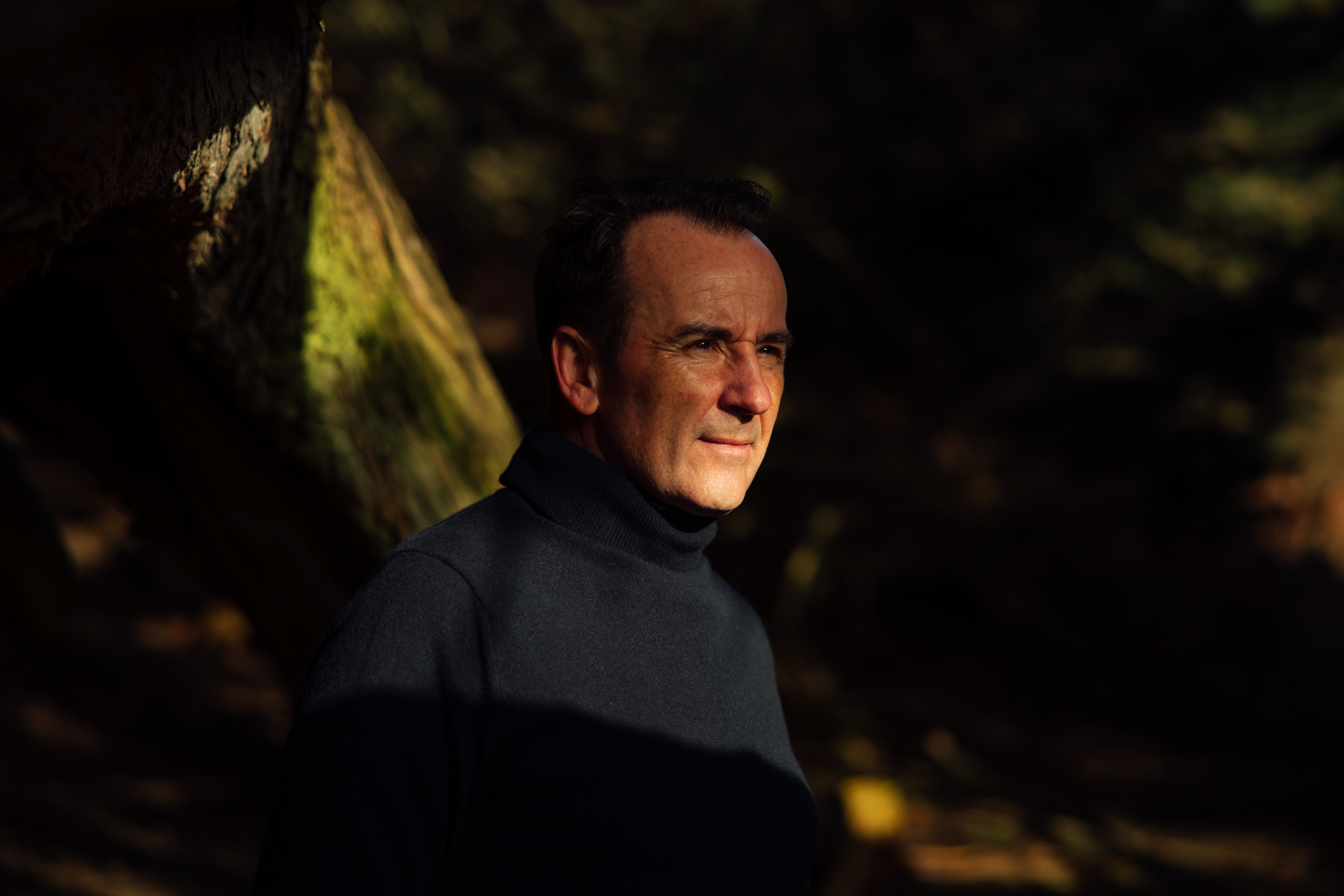
- Born: 29 May 1968 (age 58)
- Education: Oxford Brookes University
- Occupation: Chief Executive of Low Carbon
- Known for: Business founder; renewable energy entrepreneur; sustainability leader

Roy Bedlow (born 29 May 1968) is a British entrepreneur and business leader focused on renewable energy and sustainable development. He is the founder and CEO of Low Carbon, a UK-based independent power producer investing in renewable energy. Under his leadership, Low Carbon has developed and invested in clean energy projects, including solar, wind, and energy storage initiatives, in the UK and Europe. He also oversaw the company's strategic investment by CVC DIF, which acquired a stake in Low Carbon in 2024.

As part of its broader sustainability strategy under Bedlow's leadership, Low Carbon became a certified B Corporation in 2019, meeting verified standards of social and environmental performance, transparency, and accountability. In 2022, the company was recognised by B Lab as being in the top five percent of B Corps globally for its environmental impact.

Bedlow has argued that rising market demand, rather than political factors, is now the primary driver of renewable energy expansion, noting this in the context of scientific assessments indicating that the 1.5 °C global-warming threshold could be exceeded by 2030.

Before founding Low Carbon, Bedlow held senior executive roles in multinational corporations, including Apple and Palm.

In addition to Low Carbon, Bedlow is Director of Oxygen House and serves on the board of the education innovation firm Sparx. He is a trustee of the 1851 Trust, the education and sport charity founded by Olympic gold medallist Sir Ben Ainslie. Bedlow is a shareholder of Open Planet and was previously a board member of the Rocky Mountain Institute. He also serves as an Expert Advisor to The Earthshot Prize, supporting the organisation's efforts to identify and scale environmental solutions.
