= Canada SailGP Team =

SailGP Team

(Canada) NorthStar SailGP Team
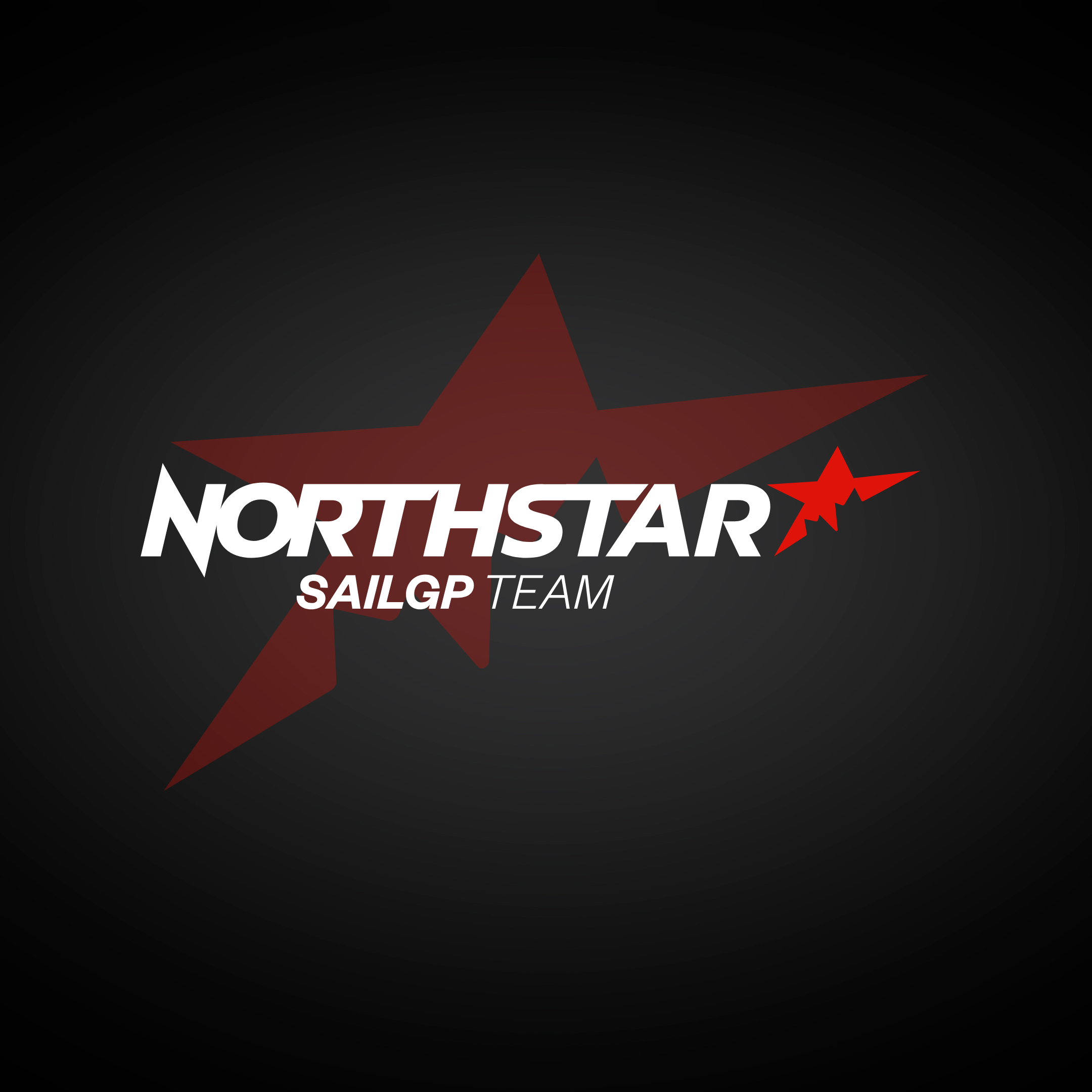
- NorthStar SailGP Team logo

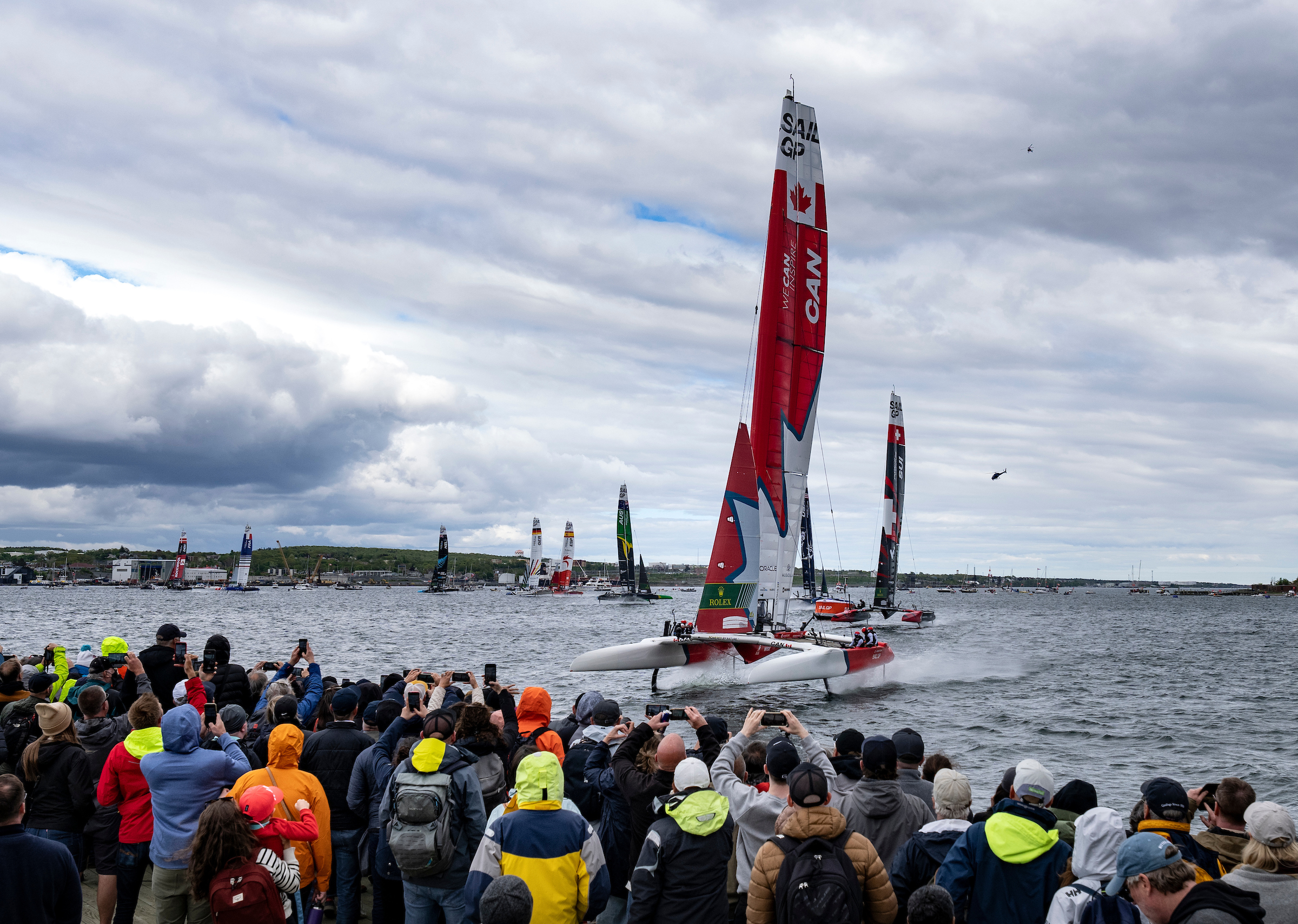
- NorthStar SailGP Team in Halifax

Northstar SailGP Team
- Esablished: 2022
- CEO: (United Kingdom) Phil Kennard
- Driver: (United Kingdom) Giles Scott
- Wing Trimmer: (United Kingdom) Paul Campbell-James
- Flight Controller: (Canada) Billy Gooderham
- Strategists: (United States) Annie Haeger (Canada) Ali Ten Hove
- Grinders: (Canada) Tom Ramshaw (New Zealand) Alex Sinclair (United States) Tim Hornsby
- Reserve Athletes: (Switzerland) Nicolas Rolaz (Canada) Georgia Lewin-LaFrance
- First Entry: 2022-23 Bermuda Sail Grand Prix
- SailGP Championships: 0
- Website: sailgp.com/teams/canada

NorthStar SailGP Team, formerly known as Canada SailGP Team, is a professional sailing team led by Giles Scott, competing in the global Rolex SailGP Championship.

== History ==
The team was established in 2022 and debuted in SailGP's 3rd season as the Canada SailGP Team. Under the leadership of driver Phil Robertson, the team made its mark on the circuit during their first season, with two podium finishes in its first two events and a victory at the ITM New Zealand Sail Grand Prix in Christchurch.

In Season 4 the team brought SailGP to Canada with Rockwool Canada Sail Grand Prix | Halifax in June 2024, which attracted more than 80,000 spectators. The event was named "the best racecourse of the season" in fan voted End-of-Season Awards. SailGP is set to return to Halifax on 20-21 June 2026 Canada in Season 6.

In September 2024, the team was acquired by Canadian biotech entrepreneur Dr Greg Bailey, and rebranded as NorthStar SailGP Team to reflect its commitment to a broader mission, symbolized by the guiding light of the North Star. Driver Phil Robertson was replaced by former Emirates Great Britain SailGP Team driver Giles Scott.

== Results ==
Season	Driver	Position
2022-23	(New Zealand) Phil Robertson	7th
2023-24	(New Zealand) Phil Robertson	5th
2025	(United Kingdom) Giles Scott	6th

== SailGP Impact League ==
NorthStar's Race For The Future partner in the SailGP Impact League is weCANfoil whose mission is to promote and provide foiling opportunities to Canadians.

The Canada SailGP Team finished Season 3 in 4th, Season 4 in 8th place, and Season 5 in 3rd place

== See also ==
- F50 (catamaran)
- Yacht racing
