= Independent Timber Merchants =

New Zealand retail co-operative

- Industry: Retail
- Headquarters: New Zealand
- Area served: New Zealand
- Products: Building supplies
- Website: itm.co.nz

Independent Timber Merchants or the Independent Timber Merchants Society (usually shortened as ITM) is a New Zealand co-operative of independent building supplies and hardware retailers. Its stores sell a range of products to both tradespeople and consumers, including building supplies, power tools, kitchens and paint.

The co-operative is the largest group of independent trade merchants in New Zealand. It is the second largest supplier of timber to the New Zealand building industry after Fletcher Building subsidiary PlaceMakers. There are 95 ITM member stores around New Zealand, including 16 in Auckland.

== History ==
=== 1990s ===
The Independent Timber Merchants Society was formed in 1991, with six founding stores in the Northland Region.

The society was registered as a company in 1993.

In 1999, there were 89 ITM stores around the country.

=== 2000s ===
In 2003, there were 80 ITM stores.

=== 2010s ===
Picton ITM experienced a downturn in demand for building supplies following the 2011 Christchurch earthquake. It responded in 2013 by expanding into the production of steel framing for clients in Canterbury and around the country, including schools.

In 2019, there were 94 ITM stores.

The timber yard at the Kopu store near Thames was gutted by fire in November 2019. No one was injured in the fire.

=== 2020s ===
In mid-2020 a cat who had been living in the Marton store for ten years disappeared for several months. The SPCA investigated reports the store manager had abandoned the cat in the countryside after it became a nuisance. The cat was relocated to New Plymouth before disappearing again.

In February 2021, a new ITM franchisee opened in Dunedin.

In March 2021, Carter Holt Harvey stopped selling structural timber to ITM due to a global timber shortage, leaving member stores short of stock. Some builders were affected, while some were able to source their timber from other sources instead. ITM criticised Carter Holt Harvey's decision to continue supplying timber to its rival PlaceMakers. By May, builders were waiting six months for building supplies; the owner of the Hawke's Bay and Gisborne ITM stores blamed the closure of sawmills coinciding with a rapid growth in the construction sector.

In September 2021, one person was injured when a Stratford ITM truck rolled outside Stratford.

In March 2022, Fletcher Building sought clearance from the Commerce Commission to purchase Tumu Merchants Limited, including a timber plant in Hastings and ITM stores in Gisborne, Napier, Hastings, Havelock North, Dannevirke and Masterton. At the time, Fletcher already owned a timber plant in Taupō and ITM rival PlaceMakers. In July, the Commission cleared the purchase after the stores left the ITM group. In its determination, the Commission stated there would still be local competition and ITM would still have a significant network of stores in New Zealand.

== Sponsorships ==
ITM has purchased the naming rights for sports events, including the NPC rugby tournament, Auckland SuperSprint motorsport event, and Hamilton 400 motorsport event.

ITM has sponsored the TV3 and Discovery Channel fishing programme ITM Fishing Show, which featured on The Late Show With David Letterman. It also sponsored the 2017 Prime reboot ITM Hook Me up!.

The Independent Timber Merchants Society sponsors a regional apprenticeship competition in 20 locations around the country. The first round of the competition was held in 2022.
