= Rockwool International =

Danish company

Rockwool A/S

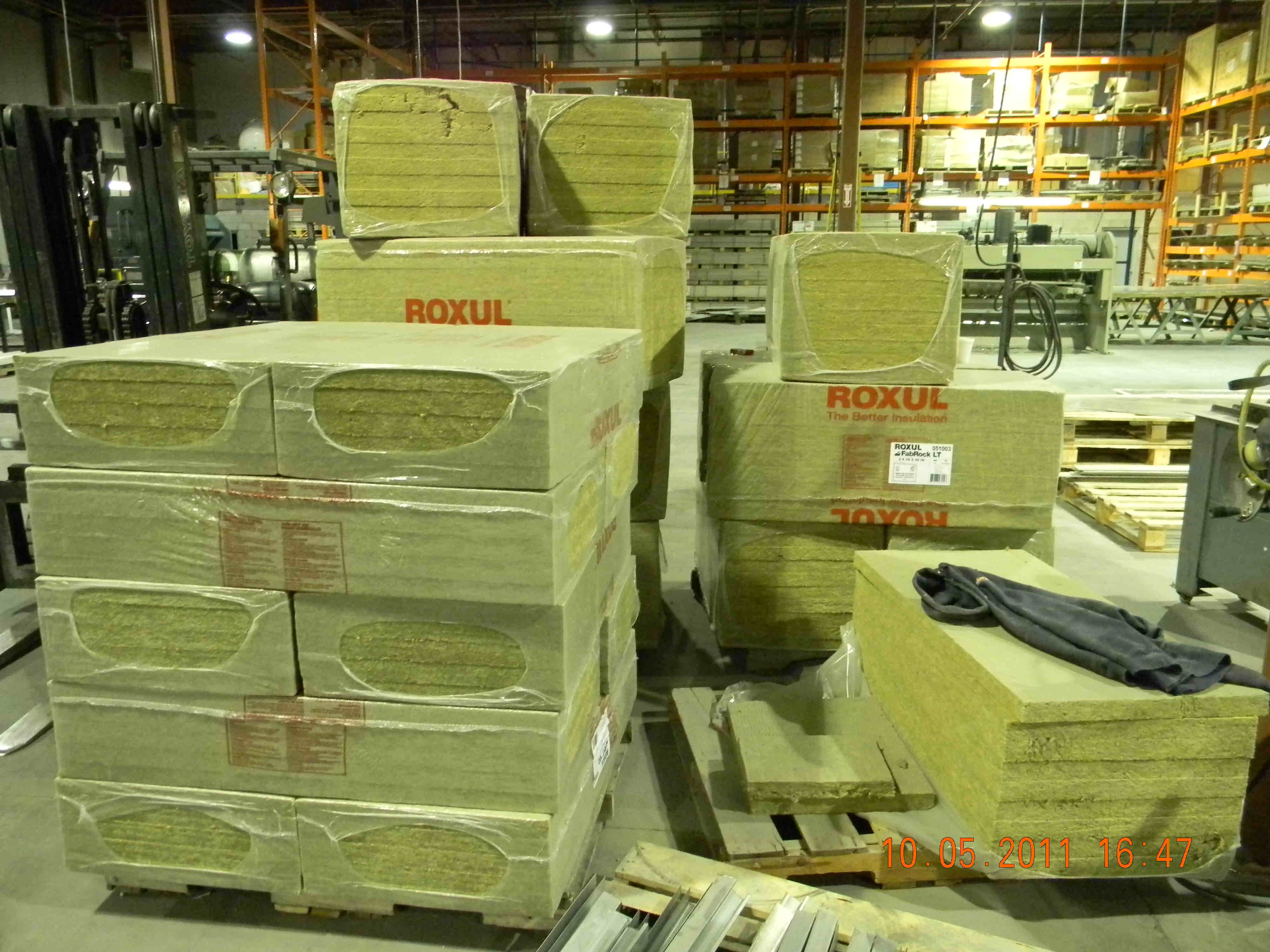
- Company type: Public company
- Traded as: Nasdaq Copenhagen: ROCK A (Class A); Nasdaq Copenhagen: ROCK B (Class B); OTC Pink Limited: RKWAF (Class A); OTC Pink Limited: RKWBF (Class B); OMXC25CAP component (ROCK B)
- ISIN: DK0010219070; DK0010219153
- Industry: Building materials
- Founded: 1909; 117 years ago
- Founder: Henrik Johan Henriksen and Valdemar Kähler
- Headquarters: Hedehusene, Denmark
- Key people: Jes Munk Hansen (CEO), Thomas Kähler (chairman)
- Products: Mineral wool products
- Revenue: ▲EUR 2,671 million (2018); EUR 2,374 million (2017)
- Number of employees: 11,600 (31/12 2018)
- Subsidiaries: Rockfon; Grodan; Rockpanel; Lapinus; Rockwool A/S
- Website: https://www.rockwoolgroup.com

Rockwool A/S (or AS), also known as the ROCKWOOL Group, is a Danish multinational manufacturer of mineral wool products headquartered in Hedehusene, Greater Copenhagen, Denmark. The company's R&D unit, employing 100 people as of 2016, is co-located with the headquarters in Copenhagen.

Rockwool was the world's largest maker of insulation materials in 2009, but had fallen to the second largest by 2016. As of 2009, 90% of the company's revenue came from the sale of insulation products, while 80% came from sales in Europe.

== History ==
Rockwool was founded as Korsør Stenforretning by constructor Henrik Johan Henriksen and brickyard-owner Valdemar Kähler in 1909 as a gravel mining company. In 1922, the company won the contract on improving the dykes at Saltbæk Vig and later purchased the area.

In 1927, it purchased a chipping plant at Hedehusene. In 1937, (Note: Citation Hanna 2010 states that production started in 1935.) a production of mineral wool (stone wool) was established at the site based on an American license acquired by Finn Henriksen during a visit to the States. By 1939, the focus of the company had fully turned toward the manufacture of insulation.

In 1972, the company was divided into H+H and I/S Kähler & Co. Kähler & Co. was led by Valdemar Kähler's grand son Claus Kähler. He was succeeded on the post by his son Tom Kähler in 1986. In 2004, Tom became chairman of the board while Eelco van Heel took over the position as chief executive officer.

The company began trading as "Rockwool International A/S" on the Copenhagen Stock Exchange in 1995. Before it became a public company, it was a family-owned business, held by the Kähler family.

The company's first plant in the United States opened in 2014 in Marshall County, Mississippi. In 2017, the company announced a North American expansion through establishment of a plant in Ranson, West Virginia through its subsidiary Roxul.

In 2023 Rockwool was named an "International Sponsors of War" by Ukraine for selling products to the Russian Ministry of Defence for use on warships.

In January 2026, the company announced that Russia had taken control of four factories on Russian territory. According to Rockwool, the value of the nationalized factories was $469 million.

== Brands ==
=== Rockfon ===
Rockfon is a brand of acoustic ceiling and wall solutions based on rockwool.

=== Flumroc ===
In 1969, Rockwool acquired a minority stake related to technology licensing in the privately held Swiss company Flumroc AG. In November 2017 Rockwool completed acquisition of all outstanding shares of Flumroc; company sales have been largely limited to Switzerland. Due to the broad recognition of the brand in Switzerland, Rockwool kept using the Flumroc brand.

=== Roxul ===
With the acquisition of a stone wool factory in Ontario, Canada, Roxul Inc. was established as the Canadian subsidiary. When business started in the United States, Roxul USA Inc. was established as the US subsidiary. On 1 January 2018, the North American insulation business rebranded to ROCKWOOL North America.

== Management ==
From 1987 to 2004, Rockwool Group's president and CEO was Tom Kähler. From 2004 to 2014, Eelco van Heel held those positions.

As of 2015, Rockwool Group's president and CEO was Jens Birgersson.

In February 2024, the company announced the appointment of Jes Munk Hansen as its new chief executive from 1 September 2024.

== Locations ==
Rockwool International is represented in 38 countries (2016), operating 28 factories in the following countries: (Note: Citation Hanna 2010 notes 23 factories in 35 countries as of 2010.)

- Canada (Milton, Ontario since 1988 and Grand Forks, British Columbia since 1999)
- Czech Republic (Bohumín since 1998)
- China (Guangzhou since 2010)
- Croatia (Istria since 2007)
- Denmark (Doense near Hobro near since 1977 and Vamdrup since 1966)
- France (Saint-Éloy-les-Mines since 1980)
- India (Dahej since 2011)
- Germany (Gladbeck since 1954, Neuburg an der Donau since 1974 and Flechtingen since 1991)
- Hungary (Tapolca since 2003)
- Malaysia (Melaka since 2000 and Bukit Raja near Klang since 2010)
- Netherlands (Roermond since 1971)
- Norway (Trondheim since 1950 and Moss since 1965)
- Poland (Cigacice since 1993 and Małkinia since 1995)
- Romania (Aricestii-Rahtivani - since 2019)
- Russia (Zheleznodorozhny since 1999, Vyborg since 2006, Troitsk since 2010, and Elabuga since 2012)
- Spain (Caparroso since 2000)
- Sweden (Eskilstuna - under construction)
- Switzerland (Flums fully owned since 2017)
- United Kingdom (Wern Tarw in Wales since 1979)
- Thailand (Rayong since 2010)
- United States (Byhalia, (Note: Roxul facility opened 2014; Rockfon facility opened in 2017. Lantrip, Patrick (23 October 2017). "U of M Files $33.5M Permit for Land Bridge". Memphis Daily News. 4594 Cayce Road.))

== Intellectual property ==
In 2008, there were a number of actions by the World Intellectual Property Organisation in regard to internet domain names which have resulted in domain transfer to Rockwool, among these being "china-ocean-rockwool.com", "rockwoolfactory.com", and "rockwoolvietnam.com". In 2015, Rockwool International filed suit against Rock Wool Manufacturing Company hoping to quash potential consumer confusion in the face of the defendant having filed a trademark application for "Rock Wool"; the suit was dismissed by the court after Rock Wool's abandonment of their trademark application.

== Rockwool Foundation ==
In 1981, six members of the Kähler family established the Rockwool Foundation with an endowment of 25% of each of their own stock holdings in Rockwool International. The Foundation has been referred to as a think tank by some authors. The Rockwool Foundation Research Unit was established as a fully independent unit with a focus on social science research in 1987 by the Foundation, led since 2003 by Torbin Tranæs. The Research Unit has been described as self-financed and non-partisan. The Research Unit has published on topics such as the extent of the financial black market in Denmark. In other published cases, it has been unclear whether the Research Unit or the Foundation have been the actor, as in the case of examining the British health care system with an eye toward the financial cost of emulating the Kaiser Permanente system, and an analysis of the impact on the Danish economy of wages lost through prisoner incarceration.
