= Athena Racing =

British sailing team

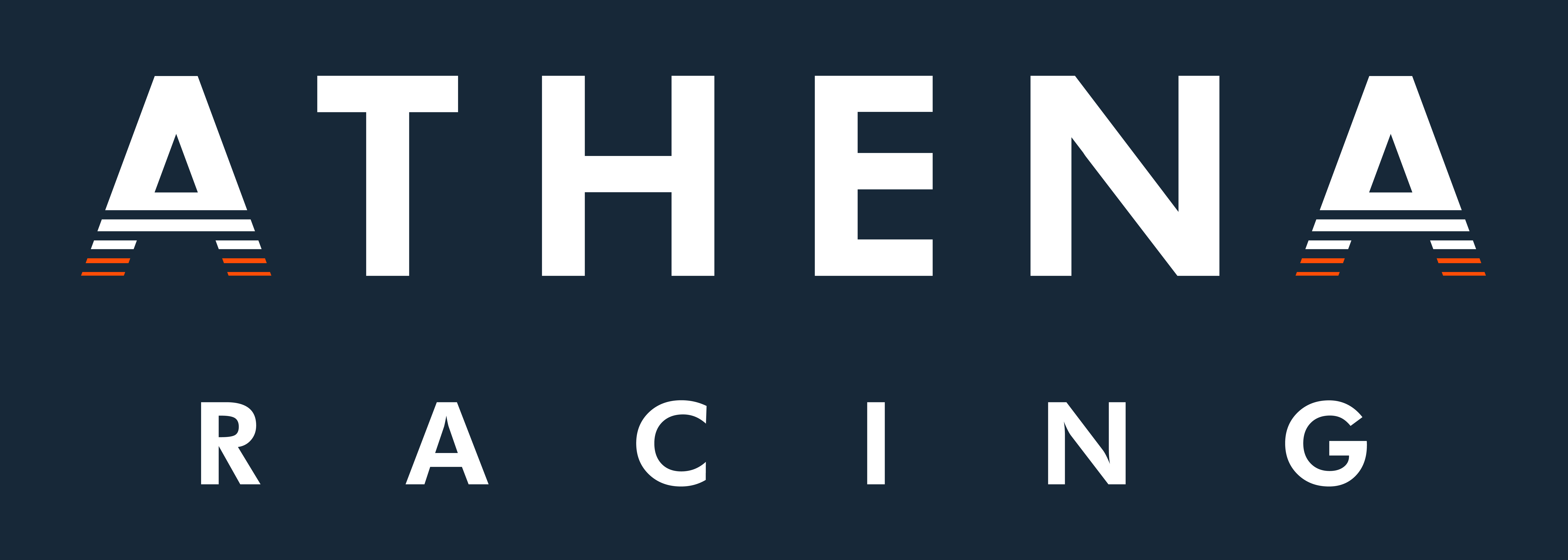

Career
- Yacht club: Royal Cornwall Yacht Club (2012–2013); Royal Yacht Squadron (2015–present)
- Established: 2012
- Nation: United Kingdom
- Team principal(s): Sir Ben Ainslie
- CEO: Ian Walker
- Skipper: TBA
- Notable victories: Louis Vuitton Cup Challenger Series 2024

Yachts
- Sail no.: Boat name
- GBR-3: R1 (AC50)
- GBR-3: RB2 Britannia (AC75)
- GBR-3: RB3 Britannia (AC75)

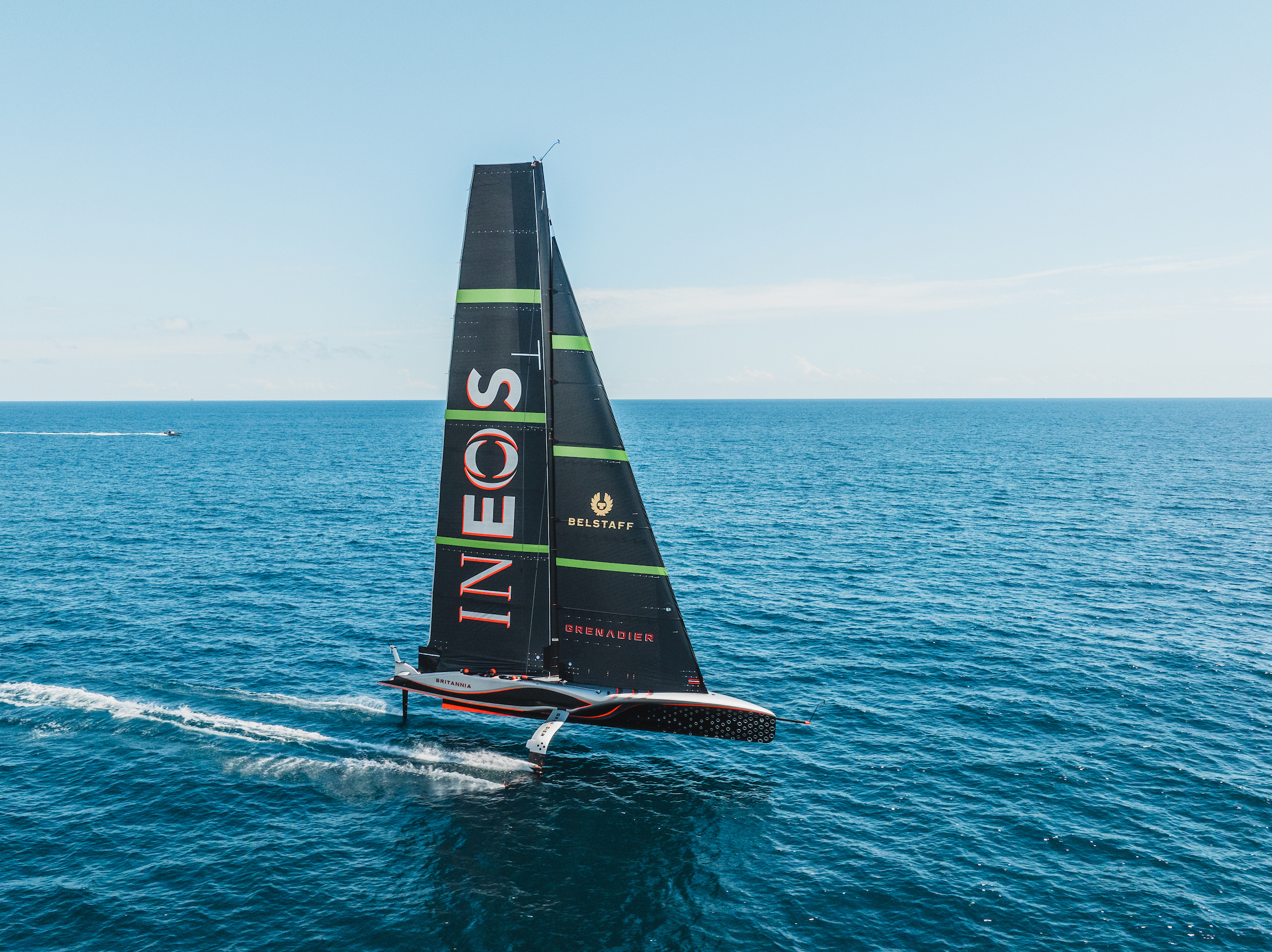
AC75 Britannia competing in the 37th America's Cup

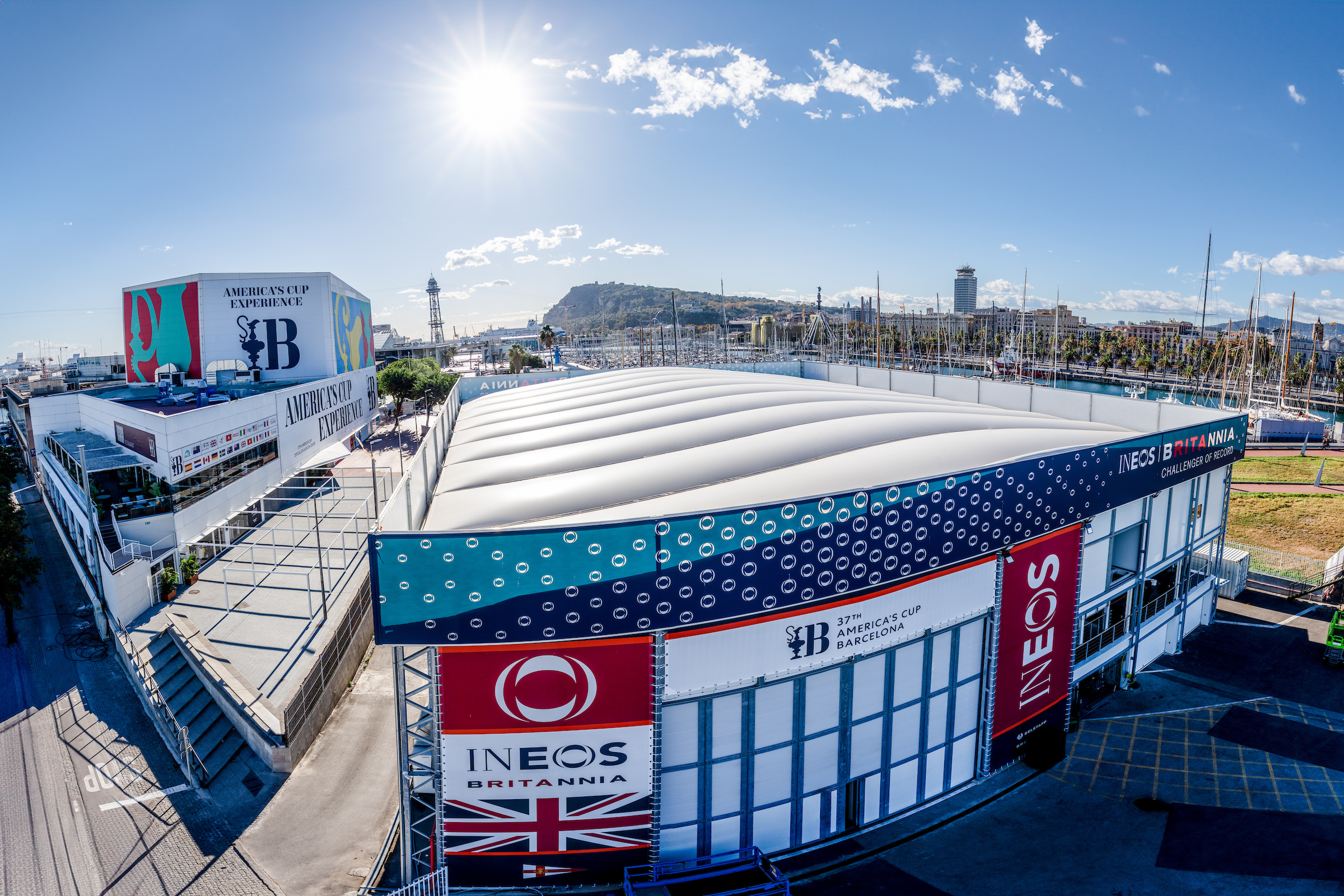
Ineos Britannia Headquarters building in Barcelona

Athena Racing is a British sailing team that is the challenger of record for the 38th America's Cup.

The team was established in 2012 with the ambition of winning the America's Cup for Great Britain and to 'bring the cup home' to the United Kingdom. The team first challenged for the 2017 America's Cup in Bermuda. In 2021 the team challenged again for the 36th America's Cup in Auckland, New Zealand, representing the Royal Yacht Squadron. In 2024 the team again challenged for the America's Cup, beating four challengers to win the 2024 Louis Vuitton Cup to qualify for the America's Cup match.

The 37th America's Cup match was a best of 13 race series held October 2024 between Taihoro, owned and sailed by the defender Emirates Team New Zealand syndicate representing the Royal New Zealand Yacht Squadron, and Ineos Britannia. The defender went on to win the event 7-2.

Emirates Team New Zealand secured their fifth America's Cup triumph on 19th October 2024, defeating The British team with a 7-2 victory in the 37th America's Cup match. The historic moment also saw the official confirmation of the next cycle: Bertie Bicket, chairman of Royal Yacht Squadron Racing, presented the challenge letter, which was accepted by Gillian Williams, commodore of the Royal New Zealand Yacht Squadron. This signing established Athena Racing as the representative of the Challenger of Record for 38th America’s Cup, Royal Yacht Squadron Racing Ltd.

The team is led by Sir Ben Ainslie. Ian Walker was announced as CEO in November 2025.

In December 2025, Athena Racing announced a majority ownership investment from Oakley Capital.

== Formation and facilities ==
In January 2012, Ben Ainslie announced the formation of a British team to compete in the America's Cup, called Ben Ainslie Racing (BAR). His team competed in the AC45 class for the remaining races of the 2011–13 America's Cup World Series to develop experience and generate interest from sponsors. The team was also known as J.P. Morgan BAR in this early period and competed for the Royal Cornwall Yacht Club in the America's Cup World Series and Extreme Sailing Series catamaran classes.

In January 2014, Ainslie began the process of raising £100M to fund the team, as well as development of racing yachts which was projected to take 30% of the budget. The project was initially backed by 12 core supporters including Sir Charles Dunstone and Sir Keith Mills. In December 2014 Ben Ainslie Racing and Red Bull Advanced Technologies (RBAT) announced that they would work together on the America's Cup project, with Formula One designer Adrian Newey leading RBAT's efforts regarding design and engineering. J.P. Morgan indicated that it was not planning to continue sponsorship and the team began the search for a new title sponsor.

In April 2014, as part of the launch of Rear Admiral Rob Stevens's 'Transforming Solent' report, which makes 36 recommendations with 15 prioritised at an investment cost of £91M, Ainslie announced plans to build a team headquarters in the Solent area. Having reviewed a number of sites, the project put forward plans to develop an operational building at Camber Dock, as part of the wider redevelopment of Portsmouth Harbour. On 18 June, Portsmouth Council approved plans for the £12M main operations building, which Ainslie confirmed would be built subject to £8M of requested UK Government-backed development funding. On 1 July 2014, in a meeting with Prime Minister David Cameron, central government funding of £7.5M towards the operational building's construction was confirmed, with construction reliant on final planning permission from the council and the project raising the additional required funds. The operational building is also where the boats are designed and manufactured, and contains administration and full crew development facilities. The design was developed by HGP Architects, which also designed the nearby Spinnaker Tower. The building was opened in June 2015 and featured approximately 400 solar panels generating 130MWh/y, ventilation features and insulation to improve its sustainability.

In September 2018 it was announced that sailing clothing brand Henri Lloyd would continue its long partnership with Sir Ben by supplying the kit for Ineos Team UK in the pursuit of the 36th challenge of the America's Cup in 2021.

On 4 October 2021, the team announced a high-performance partnership with Mercedes-AMG F1 Applied Science, a division of the Mercedes-AMG Petronas F1 Team, bringing together the best of the worlds of high-performance marine and automotive engineering, with the goal to win the America's Cup for Britain.

The team was based in Brackley, home of the Mercedes-AMG Petronas F1 Team. James Allison will be the technical lead of the team's 37th America's Cup challenge in his capacity as Chief Technical Officer of the Mercedes-AMG Petronas F1 Team and Ineos Britannia.

== 34th America's Cup ==
=== 2012-2013 Americas Cup World Series ===
JP Morgan BAR initially competed in the 2011–13 America's Cup World Series competing in their AC45 catamaran. The team had excellent performance in two events in San Francisco but slipped to a surprise defeat in Naples in April 2013. In August 2013, the competition jury received a report from Oracle Team USA that their boat and others they had loaned had unauthorised modifications. Since they were using one of the out of measurement boats provided by Team Oracle USA, Ainslie withdrew his team from the competition on 7 August 2013. They denied that they had any prior knowledge that the boat was out of measurement, and were scored DSQ (disqualified) from the series.

America's Cup World Series 2012-2013
| | Team | Skipper | Total pts | Notes |
| 1 | (United States) Oracle Racing | (Australia) Jimmy Spithill (Australia) Tom Slingsby | 274 | DSQ |
| 2 | (Italy) Luna Rossa Challenge | (United Kingdom) Chris Draper | 204 | |
| 3 | (United Kingdom) Ben Ainslie Racing | (United Kingdom) Ben Ainslie | 196 | DSQ |
| 4 | Team New Zealand | (New Zealand) Dean Barker | 193 | |
| 5 | (Sweden) Artemis Racing | (United States) Terry Hutchinson (Sweden) Charlie Ekberg | 181 | |
| 6 | (France) Energy Team | (France) Loick Peyron (France) Yann Guichard | 175 | |
| 7 | (Italy) Luna Rossa Challenge | (Italy) Francesco Bruni (United Kingdom) Paul Cambell-James (Spain) Iker Martínez | 165 | |
| 8 | (United States) Oracle Racing | (New Zealand) Russell Coutts (Australia) Darren Bundock | 114 | |
| 9 | (South Korea) Team Korea | (United Kingdom) Chris Draper (New Zealand) Pete Burling | 110 | |
| 10 | (Sweden) Artemis Racing | (Australia) Nathan Outteridge (Argentina) Santiago Lange | 98 | |
| 11 | China Team | (New Zealand) Phil Robertson (Netherlands) Mitch Booth | 78 | |
| 12 | (United States) HS Racing | (Austria) Roman Hagara | 39 | DSQ |

In 2013, the team set a new multihull record of 2 hours 52 minutes 15 seconds for the Round the Island Race in their AC45.

=== 34th America's Cup ===
The team did not enter to compete in the 34th America's Cup, with Ben Ainslie instead sailing as helm onboard Oracle Team USA's second AC72 in the team's training programme ahead of the event. During the 34th America's Cup match, Oracle Team USA were losing to Emirates Team New Zealand 8–1. The American syndicate decided to replace tactician John Kostecki with Ainslie, and went on to win 10 consecutive race wins to win the America's Cup. Ben Ainslie was credited as one of the key reasons behind their famous comeback to win the America's Cup in 2013. Several of the team's other key sailors also competed for Luna Rossa Challenge in the Louis Vuitton Cup challenger selection series.

== 35th America's Cup ==
=== Yachts ===
| Club | Name | Launch date | Class |
|---|---|---|---|
| Royal Yacht Squadron | T1 | October 2014 | AC45F |
| Royal Yacht Squadron | T2 | October 2015 | AC45 Turbo |
| Royal Yacht Squadron | T3 | April 2016 | AC45 Turbo |
| Royal Yacht Squadron | R1 | February 2017 | AC50 |

=== Crew ===
| Sailor | Position |
|---|---|
| (United Kingdom) Ben Ainslie | Skipper |
| (United Kingdom) Giles Scott | Tactician |
| (United Kingdom) Paul Cambell-James | Mainsail Trimmer |
| (United Kingdom) Bleddyn Mon | Trimmer |
| (Australia) Jonathan Macbeth | Grinder |
| (United Kingdom) Nick Hutton | Grinder |
| (United Kingdom) David Carr | Grinder |
| (United Kingdom) Neil Hunter | Grinder |
| (United Kingdom) Ed Powys | Grinder |

=== 2015-2016 Americas Cup World Series ===
Following Ainslie's win representing the US, it was announced that Ben Ainslie Racing would challenge for the 35th America's Cup in 2017. The team competed in the 2014 Extreme Sailing Series, finishing 5th overall in the Extreme 40 class catamaran.

The team raced in 2015-16 America's Cup World Series in the AC45F catamaran class, winning events in Portsmouth, Toulon and Fukuoka to take the overall series win.

America's Cup World Series 2015-2016
| | Team | Skipper | Total pts |
| 1 | (United Kingdom) Land Rover BAR | Sir Ben Ainslie | 512 |
| 2 | (United States) Oracle Team USA | Jimmy Spithill | 493 |
| 3 | Emirates Team New Zealand | Pete Burling | 485 |
| 4 | Softbank Team Japan | Dean Barker | 466 |
| 5 | (Sweden) Artemis Racing | Nathan Outteridge | 460 |
| 6 | Groupama Team France | Franck Cammas | 419 |

=== Louis Vuitton Cup ===
In March 2015, former McLaren CEO Martin Whitmarsh was announced as Ben Ainslie Racing's CEO. In June 2015, Ben Ainslie announced a partnership with Land Rover and changed the team's name to Land Rover BAR.

The team's win in the 2015–16 America's Cup World Series conferred points towards the 2017 Louis Vuitton Cup in Bermuda, which began May 2017. The team was knocked out of the competition by New Zealand in the Challenger semi-final. The defeat was attributed simply to the greater speed of the opponent's boat.

Round Robins
| | Team | W | L | ACWS pts | Total pts |
| 1 | (United States) Oracle Team USA | 8 | 2 | 0 | 9 |
| 2 | Emirates Team New Zealand | 8 | 2 | 0 | 8 |
| 3 | (United Kingdom) Land Rover BAR | 4 | 6 | 2 | 6 |
| 4 | (Sweden) Artemis Racing | 5 | 5 | 0 | 5 |
| 5 | Softbank Team Japan | 3 | 7 | 0 | 3 |
| 5 | Groupama Team France | 2 | 8 | 0 | 2 |

Semi-finals
| | Team | W | L |
| 1 | Emirates Team New Zealand | 5 | 2 |
| 2 | (United Kingdom) Land Rover BAR | 2 | 5 |

== Red Bull Youth Americas Cup ==
Following the announcement that alongside the 35th Americas Cup would be held the Red Bull Youth Americas Cup, Land Rover BAR launched the Land Rover BAR Academy in January 2016, with over 150 young British sailors under the age of 24 applying to be part of the team. Of these sailors, a team of sailors were selected. The squad trained and competed on a GC32 Class catamaran in the Extreme Sailing Series in 2016 and 2017, under the expert guidance of the team's senior sailors and coaches.

The team raced in Bermuda in the 2017 Red Bull Youth America's Cup in the AC45F foiling catamaran class, finishing in 1st place with 50 points, 2 points ahead of their nearest rivals from New Zealand. The team was credited with being the only team to race with a female sailor on board.

Qualifying Group A
| | Team | Skipper | Total Pts |
| 1 | (Sweden) Artemis Youth Racing | Rasmus Rosengren | 55 |
| 2 | SVB Team Germany | Paul Kohlhoff | 47 |
| 3 | (Switzerland) Team Tilt | Sebastien Schneiter | 46 |
| 4 | Team France Jeune | Robin Follin | 46 |
| 5 | Youth Vikings Denmark | Daniel Bjørnholt | 43 |
| 6 | Kaijin Team Japan | Ibuki Koizumi | 33 |

Qualifying Group B
| | Team | Skipper | Total Pts |
| 1 | (New Zealand) NZL Sailing Team | Logan Dunning-Beck | 51 |
| 2 | (United Kingdom) Land Rover BAR Academy | Rob Bunce | 51 |
| 3 | (Spain) Spanish Impulse | Jordi Xammar | 51 |
| 4 | (Bermuda) Team BDA | MacKenzie Cooper | 45 |
| 5 | (United States) Next Generation USA | Carson Crain | 36 |
| 6 | (Austria) Candidate Sailing Team | Lukas Höllwerth | 36 |

Final
| | Team | Skipper | Total Pts |
| 1 | (United Kingdom) Land Rover BAR Academy | Rob Bunce | 50 |
| 2 | (New Zealand) NZL Sailing Team | Logan Dunning-Beck | 48 |
| 3 | (Switzerland) Team Tilt | Sebastien Schneiter | 42 |
| 4 | (Sweden) Artemis Youth Racing | Rasmus Rosengren | 37 |
| 5 | Team France Jeune | Robin Follin | 35 |
| 6 | (Spain) Spanish Impulse | Jordi Xammar | 34 |
| 7 | SVB Team Germany | Paul Kohlhoff | 33 |
| 8 | (Bermuda) Team BDA | MacKenzie Cooper | 33 |

=== Crew ===
| Sailor | Position |
|---|---|
| (United Kingdom) Neil Hunter | Skipper |
| (United Kingdom) Rob Bunce | Skipper |
| (United Kingdom) Chris Taylor | Helm |
| (United Kingdom) Owen Bowerman | Helm |
| (United Kingdom) Annabel Vose | Tactician |
| (United Kingdom) Elliot Hanson | Mainsail Trimmer |
| (United Kingdom) Will Alloway | Mainsail Trimmer |
| (United Kingdom) Adam Kay | Trimmer |
| (United Kingdom) Oli Greber | Trimmer |
| (United Kingdom) Sam Batten | Trimmer |

== Extreme Sailing Series and GC32 Racing Tour ==
Following on from Land Rover BAR Academy's success over the previous two years in the GC32 class, the team, newly sponsored by Ineos competed simultaneously in the 2018 Extreme Sailing Series and the 2018 GC32 Racing Tour, both in the hydro-foiling GC32 Class catamaran class. The Ineos Rebels youth team finished in 4th place overall in the Extreme Sailing Series, whilst the senior Ineos Team UK team finished in 2nd place overall in the GC32 Racing Tour, with several event wins. Following the collapse of the Extreme Sailing Series at the end of 2018, the team began using their two GC32s for two boat training in preparation for their 36th America's Cup campaign.

Extreme Sailing Series 2018
| | Team | Skipper | Total Pts |
| 1 | (Switzerland) Alinghi | Arnaud Psarofaghis | 92 |
| 2 | Oman Air | Phil Robertson | 83 |
| 3 | (Denmark) SAP Extreme Sailing Team | Adam Minoprio | 83 |
| 4 | (Austria) Red Bull Sailing Team | Roman Hagara | 72 |
| 5 | (United Kingdom) Ineos Rebels UK | Leigh Macmillan | 70 |
| 6 | Team Mexico | Erik Brockmann | 56 |

GC32 Racing Tour 2018
| | Team | Skipper | Total Pts |
| 1 | (France) Norauto | Franck Cammas | 7 |
| 2 | (United Kingdom) Ineos Team UK | Sir Ben Ainslie | 17 |
| 3 | (France) Zoulou | Erik Maris | 19 |
| 4 | (Switzerland) Realteam | Jerome Clerc | 20 |
| 5 | (United States) Argo | Jason Carroll | 23 |
| 6 | (New Zealand) Frank Racing | Simon Hull | 27 |
| 7 | (Australia) .film Racing | Simon Delzoppo | 31 |
| 8 | (Argentina) Codigo Rojo Racing | Frederico Ferioli | 41 |

== SailGP ==
On 26 November 2019, SailGP announced that Ben Ainslie would join the Great Britain SailGP Team as helm on the British F50 foiling catamaran. The team announced title sponsorship from Ineos, with the sailing team made up of both existing SailGP GBR and Ineos Team UK sailors. The collaboration between the teams concluded at the end of 2020.

The team's first and only SailGP event was in Sydney in February 2020. Ainslie's crew won four of the five fleet races, before taking the win in the final race against Tom Slingsby's Australian team. The second round of the 2020 SailGP series was due to be held in San Francisco in May 2020, however SailGP delayed the second season until 2021 due to the ongoing COVID-19 pandemic, with points from the Sydney race removed from the championship.

In subsequent seasons, Athena Sports Group has continued to operate the British SailGP Team, currently branded as Emirates GBR SailGP Team and with sailor crossover between Americas Cup and SailGP operations.

=== Crew ===
| Sailor | Position |
|---|---|
| (United Kingdom) Sir Ben Ainslie | Helm |
| (United Kingdom) Chris Draper | CEO |
| (Australia) Luke Parkinson | Flight Controller |
| (Australia) Iain Jensen | Wing Trimmer |
| (United Kingdom) Richard Mason | Trimmer |
| (United Kingdom) Matt Gotrel | Grinder |
| (United Kingdom) Neil Hunter | Grinder |

=== Results ===
| Pos | Team | (Australia) SYD (Note: Although the first round in Sydney was successfully completed before the delay of the rest of the season, points scored were later removed from the championship.) | | | | | | Points |
| Pos | Team | 1 | 2 | 3 | 4 | 5 | F | Points |
|---|---|---|---|---|---|---|---|---|
| 1 | (United Kingdom) Great Britain | 1 | 1 | 1 | 1 | 4 | 1 | 47 |
| 2 | Australia | 2 | 3 | 5 | 2 | 1 | 2 | 42 |
| 3 | Japan | 3 | 4 | 3 | 3 | 3 | | 39 |
| 4 | Spain | 5 | 2 | 2 | 4 | 2 | | 31 |
| 5 | United States | 4 | 6 | 4 | 5 | 5 | | 31 |
| 6 | Denmark | 7 | 5 | 6 | 7 | 6 | | 22 |
| 7 | France | 6 | DNS | DNS | 6 | 7 | | 14 |
Citation:

Key
| Colour | Result |
|---|---|
| 1 | Winner |
| 2 | Second place |
| 3 | Third place |
| 4–7 | Finish |
| DNF | Did not finish |
| DNS | Did not start |
| DSQ | Disqualified |
| WH | Withheld from racing |
| C | Race cancelled |

== 36th America's Cup ==
In 2018 it was announced that the team would join forces with Ineos and would challenge for the 36th America's Cup in Auckland, New Zealand, as Ineos Team UK. The team will race for Royal Yacht Squadron Racing.

The Ineos team boasts a world class sailing crew including Team Principal Skipper Sir Ben Ainslie and fellow Olympic Gold medallist Giles Scott. Combined, the team has 16 America's Cup wins and eight Olympic medals.

Ineos Team UK's leadership team includes four times Cup winner Grant Simmer as CEO and Nick Holroyd, who was instrumental in bringing foiling technology into the Cup, as Chief Designer.

On 4 October 2019 Ineos Team UK launched their first America's Cup boat from their HQ in Portsmouth, naming her ‘Britannia’ in homage to one of Britain's most famous racing yachts, after over 90,000 design hours and 50,000 construction hours.

In January 2020 the team relocated to Cagliari, Sardinia, for a winter training camp with the team's first America's Cup boat. In March 2020, however, due to the COVID-19 global pandemic the team made the decision to withdraw all sailing operations from Sardinia and return to the UK.

In October 2020 the team relocated to Auckland for the 36th America's Cup and on 16 October the team launched their race boat for the 36th America's Cup, Britannia, a foiling monohull capable of estimated top speeds of over 50 knots (93 km/H, 57.5 MP/H) and a significant evolution from the team's first AC75 with noticeable changes to hull shape, deck layout and more.

=== Yachts ===
| Club | Name | Launch date | Class |
|---|---|---|---|
| Royal Yacht Squadron | T5 | August 2018 | Quant 28F |
| Royal Yacht Squadron | Britannia | October 2019 | AC75 |
| Royal Yacht Squadron | Britannia II | October 2020 | AC75 |

=== Crew ===
| Sailor | Position |
|---|---|
| (United Kingdom) Sir Ben Ainslie | Skipper |
| (United Kingdom) Giles Scott | Tactician |
| (United Kingdom) Leigh MacMillan | Flight Controller |
| (Australia) Luke Parkinson | Flight Controller |
| (United Kingdom) Bleddyn Mon | Mainsail Trimmer |
| (Australia) Joey Newton | Trimmer |
| (United Kingdom) Nick Hutton | Trimmer |
| (United Kingdom) Richard Mason | Trimmer |
| (United Kingdom) Ben Cornish | Grinder |
| (United Kingdom) Chris Brittle | Grinder |
| (United Kingdom) David Carr | Grinder |
| (Australia) Graeme Spence | Grinder |
| (United Kingdom) Matt Gotrel | Grinder |
| (United Kingdom) Neil Hunter | Grinder |
| (United Kingdom) Oli Greber | Grinder |
| (United Kingdom) Tim Carter | Grinder |

=== 2019-2020 America's Cup World Series ===
Due to the COVID-19 pandemic, the first two events in the 2019-20 America's Cup World Series due to be held in Cagliari and Portsmouth were cancelled due to the impact of the COVID-19 pandemic on sports. The four AC36 teams competed in the third and final ACWS event in Auckland in December 2020. Ineos Team UK struggled to keep their AC75 foiling during their manoeuvres, consequently ending the event with no wins, and in last place overall.

ACWS Auckland
| | Team | Helm | W | L |
| 1 | Emirates Team New Zealand | Pete Burling | 5 | 1 |
| 2 | (United States) American Magic | Dean Barker | 4 | 2 |
| 3 | (Italy) Luna Rossa Prada Pirelli | James Spithill; Francesco Bruni | 3 | 3 |
| 4 | (United Kingdom) Ineos Team UK | Sir Ben Ainslie | 0 | 6 |

=== Prada Cup ===
Following a disappointing performance in the Auckland ACWS event in December 2020, the team spent the following three weeks making modifications to their boat Britannia ahead of the start of the Prada Cup qualifying series. This included a new mast and sails as well as modifications to the hull and foils. The team received support from Ineos sponsored Mercedes-AMG Petronas F1 Team.

Ineos Team UK dominated the Round Robin phase of the Prada Cup which saw them race and beat each of the two other challenger teams three times, securing their place in the Prada Cup Final beginning on 13 February 2021. The team's place in the Prada Cup final marked a significant point in their campaign, being the furthest any British challenge had progressed in the competition since the introduction of a challenger selection series.

Round Robins
| | Team | Helm | W | L |
| 1 | (United Kingdom) Ineos Team UK | Sir Ben Ainslie | 6 | 0 |
| 2 | (Italy) Luna Rossa Prada Pirelli | James Spithill; Francesco Bruni | 3 | 3 |
| 3 | (United States) American Magic | Dean Barker | 0 | 6 |

After Luna Rossa Prada Pirelli's win in the Prada Cup Semi-finals against American Magic, the American team was eliminated from the event, securing the Italian team's place in the Prada Cup Final alongside Ineos Team UK.

The Prada Cup Finals were held in predominantly light wind (8-14 knots), with Luna Rossa showing great improvement in boat handling, winning the first 5 races consecutively. Ineos Team UK showed superior downwind pace in Race 6, taking their sole race win before Luna Rossa dominated Day 4 to take their sixth and seventh race win for the Prada Cup overall, and securing their place in the 36th America's Cup Match against Emirates Team New Zealand.

Final
| | Team | Helm | W | L |
| 1 | (Italy) Luna Rossa Prada Pirelli | James Spithill; Francesco Bruni | 7 | 1 |
| 2 | (United Kingdom) Ineos Team UK | Sir Ben Ainslie | 1 | 7 |

== 37th America's Cup ==
The 2024 America's Cup was the 37th staging of the America's Cup yacht race. It was contested from 12 October 2024 as a first-to-seven-wins match-race series in Barcelona, Catalonia, Spain, between Taihoro, representing the defender, the Royal New Zealand Yacht Squadron; and Britannia, representing the Royal Yacht Squadron of the United Kingdom, which won the Louis Vuitton Challenger Selections Series, also in Barcelona, on 4 October 2024. It was the first time the UK has sailed in an America's Cup match since 1964.

The 37th America's Cup match was a best of 13 race series held October 2024 between Taihoro, owned and sailed by the Defender Emirates Team New Zealand syndicate representing the Royal New Zealand Yacht Squadron, and INEOS Britannia, who had beaten four challengers to win the 2024 Louis Vuitton Cup to qualify for the America's Cup Match.

Emirates Team New Zealand secured their fifth America's Cup triumph on 19 October 2024, defeating the British Team with a 7–2 victory in the 37th America's Cup Match. The historic moment also saw the official confirmation of the next cycle: Bertie Bicket, Chairman of Royal Yacht Squadron Racing, presented the Challenge letter, which was accepted by Gillian Williams, Commodore of the Royal New Zealand Yacht Squadron. This signing established Athena Racing as the representative of the Challenger of Record for 38th America’s Cup, Royal Yacht Squadron Racing Ltd.
