= Winston Macfarlane =

New Zealand sailor

Winston Macfarlane is a New Zealand sailor who has competed in multiple America's Cups.

Macfarlane was born in Blenheim, New Zealand and completed a degree in agriculture, planning to work on family farm.

He joined Team New Zealand following the 2000 America's Cup as a runner/pitmen. Macfarlane was with Team New Zealand for both the 2003 and 2007 America's Cup.

Between 2009 and 2010, he raced in the Louis Vuitton Trophy regattaas, the TP52 series and the Extreme Sailing Series with Team New Zealand. He then sailed in the 2011–13 America's Cup World Series and 2013 America's Cup, alternating with Grant Dalton as a grinder on board.

Macfarlane left Team New Zealand in 2015, joining Team Japan for the 2015–16 America's Cup World Series. He also sailed with Sail Portugal in the 2016 Extreme Sailing Series.
