= 2019 GC32 Racing Tour =

Event title
- Edition: 6th
- Dates: 22 May – 10 November 2019
- Yachts: GC32

Results
- Winner: Alinghi (Switzerland)

2019 was the sixth series of the GC32 Racing Tour. It was the first to include well-known GC32 teams Alinghi, Oman Air and Red Bull Sailing Team, following the collapse of the Extreme Sailing Series. The 2019 season consisted of five acts, returning to Villasimius, Riva del Garda, Lagos, and Palma de Mallorca as well as its debut in Muscat, Oman.

== Events ==
22-26 May: Villasimius Cup / Villasimius, Sardinia, Italy

26-30 June: GC32 World Championship / Lagos, Portugal

31 July- 4 August: 38 Copa del Rey MAPFRE / Palma de Mallorca, Spain

11-15 September: GC32 Riva Cup / Riva del Garda, Italy

6-10 November: GC32 Oman Cup / Muscat, Oman

== Teams ==
=== Full-Season Teams ===
==== Alinghi ====
Arnaud Psarofaghis

Bryan Mettraux

Yves Detrey

Nicolas Charbonnier

Timothé Lapauw

==== Black Star Sailing Team ====
Christian Zuerrer

Flavio Marazzi

Florian Trüb

Adam Kay

Will Alloway

==== RedBull Sailing Team ====
Roman Hagara

Hans-Peter Steinacher

Mark Spearman

Rhys Mara

Julius Hallström

==== Oman Air ====
Adam Minoprio

Pete Greenhalgh

Stewart Dodson

Adam Piggott

Nasser Al Mashari

==== ZouLou ====
Erik Maris

Thierry Fouchier

Thomas le Breton

Bruno Mourniac

Nicolas Heintz

==== Argo ====
Jason Carroll

Sébastien Col

Nick Hutton

Alister Richardson

Scott ‘Chuck’ Norris

=== Part-Season Teams ===
==== M&G Tressis Silicius ====
Iker Martinez

==== INEOS Rebels UK ====
Ben Ainslie

Oli Greber

Ben Cornish

Joey Newton

Giles Scott

==== NORAUTO ====
Franck Cammas

Arnaud Jarlegan

Olivier Herledant

Matthieu Vandame

Devan Le Bihan

==== CHINAone NINGBO ====
Phil Robertson

Ed Powys

Liu 'Black' Xue

Chen 'Horace' Jinhao

Liu 'Leo' Ming

== Results ==
=== Overall Results ===
| Rank | Team | Total | Event 1 | Event 2 | Event 3 | Event 4 | Event 5 |
|---|---|---|---|---|---|---|---|
| 1 | Alinghi | 7 | 2 | 1 | 2 | 1 | 1 |
| 2 | Oman Air | 10 | 1 | 2 | 1 | 2 | 4 |
| 3 | Red Bull Sailing Team | 16 | 3 | 4 | 3 | 3 | 3 |
| 4 | ZouLou | 19 | 4 | 5 | 4 | 4 | 2 |
| 5 | Argo | 26 | 5 | 3 | DNC/7 | 5 | 6 |
| 6 | Black Star Sailing Team | 28 | 6 | 6 | 5 | 6 | 5 |

=== Owner-Driver Results ===
| Rank | Team | Total | Event 1 | Event 2 | Event 3 | Event 4 | Event 5 |
|---|---|---|---|---|---|---|---|
| 1 | ZouLou | 6 | 1 | 2 | 1 | 1 | 1 |
| 2 | Argo | 11 | 2 | 1 | DNC/3 | 2 | DNC/3 |
