= 2020 GC32 Racing Tour =

Sailing racing tour series

Event title
- Edition: 7th
- Dates: 25 March – 25 October 2020
- Yachts: GC32

2020 is the seventh series of the GC32 Racing Tour. The season consists of five acts, returning to Villasimius, Riva del Garda, Lagos, and Muscat. The final venue of the series will be announced in due course.

== Events ==
25-29 March: GC32 Oman Cup / Muscat, Oman

27-31 May: GC32 Riva Cup / Riva del Garda, Italy

24-28 June: GC32 Lagos Cup / Lagos, Portugal

16-20 September: GC32 World Championship / Villasimius, Sardinia, Italy

21-25 October: GC32 Season Finale / Venue TBA

On March 12, 2020, it was announced that the season opener in Muscat, Oman, had been cancelled as a result of the COVID-19 pandemic.

== Teams ==
=== Alinghi ===
In 2020, Ernesto Bertarelli's Alinghi return for a second consecutive year on the GC32 Racing Tour, following on from their overall win of the 2019 season.

Arnaud Psarofaghis

Bryan Mettraux

Yves Detrey

Nicolas Charbonnier

Timothé Lapauw

=== TBA ===
Adam Minoprio

Pete Greenhalgh

Nasser Al Mashari

Ed Powys

James Wierzbowski

=== Red Bull Sailing Team ===
Roman Hagara

Hans-Peter Steinacher

Mark Spearman

Rhys Mara

Julius Hallström
