= 2017 Extreme Sailing Series =

2017 international sailing events

Event title
- Edition: 11th
- Dates: 8 March – 3 December 2017
- Yachts: GC32

The 2017 Extreme Sailing Series is the eleventh edition of the sailing series and the seventh year of it being a fully global event. In 2017, the series continued in the GC32 foiling catamaran after the series moved away from the Extreme 40 in 2016.

== Acts ==
2017 acts

=== Act 1: Muscat, Oman ===
The first act of the series was held again in Muscat, Oman, on the weekend of 8–11 March 2017 .

=== Act 2: Qingdao, China ===
As the previous year, Qingdao, China, was the host of the second act of the 2017 series, on the weekend of 28 April to 1 May 2017.

=== Act 3: Funchal, Madeira Islands ===
For the second time, Madeira hosted the series as the third act in Marina Funchal, on the weekend of 29 June to 2 July 2017.

=== Act 4: Barcelona, Spain ===
Barcelona, Spain, hosted the fourth act, on the weekend of 20–23 July 2017.

=== Act 5: Hamburg, Germany ===
Act 5 was held in Hamburg, Germany, for the third time, on 10–13 August 2017.

=== Act 6: Cardiff, UK ===
For the sixth time, Cardiff, Wales, was again a host city, and was held on the bank holiday weekend of 25–28 August 2017.

=== Act 7: San Diego, United States ===
San Diego, United States, was a venue for the series that year, held on 19–22 October 2017.

=== Act 8: Los Cabos, Mexico ===
The final act was held in Los Cabos, Mexico, the first time as a venue in the Extreme Sailing Series. It was held on the weekend of 30 November to 3 December 2017.

== Teams ==
=== Alinghi ===
The defending champions also won the title in 2008 and 2014.

The team included Ernesto Bertarelli (skipper/helm), Arnaud Psarofaghis (skipper/helm), Nicolas Charbonnier (tactician), Nils Frei (headsail trimmer), Yves Detrey (bowman), and Timothé Lapauw (foil trimmer).

=== Land Rover BAR Academy ===
The Ben Ainslie Racing academy team consisted of Rob Bunce (skipper/bowman), Chris Taylor/Owen Bowerman (helmsman), Sam Batten (headsail trimmer), Oli Greber/Adam Kay/Matt Brushwood (trimmer/floater), and Elliot Hanson/Will Alloway (mainsail trimmer).

=== NZ Extreme Sailing Team ===
A new team to the series, they were led by co-skippers Chris Steele and Graeme Sutherland and also included Harry Hull, Josh Salthouse, Josh Junior, Andy Maloney, and George Anyon.

=== Oman Air ===
The team included skipper Phil Robertson, Pete Greenhalgh, Ed Smyth, Nasser Al Mashari, and James Wierzbowski.

=== Red Bull Sailing Team ===
The team included skipper Roman Hagara, Hans-Peter Steinacher, Stewart Dodson, Will Tiller, and Adam Piggott.

=== SAP Extreme Sailing Team ===
The team included co-skippers Jes Gram-Hansen and Rasmus Køstner, Adam Minoprio, Pierluigi de Felice, Mads Emil Stephensen, and Richard Mason.

=== Wild cards ===
==== FNOB Impulse ====
Racing in Barcelona, FNOB Impulse included Jordi Xammar, Joan Cardona, Luis Bugallo, Kevin Cabrera, and Florián Trittel.

==== Team Extreme ====
Team Extreme was skippered by veteran Mitch Booth and included Alberto Torné, Jordi Sánchez, Tom Buggy, Jordi Booth, Freddie White, Joan Costa, and Ruben Booth.

==== Lupe Tortilla Demetrio ====
Helmed by John Tomko, the team included Jonathan Atwood, Matthew Whitehead, and Tripp and Trevor Burd.

== Results ==
Results as of 01 June 2018.

Rank	Team	Act 1 (Oman)	Act 2 (China)	Act 3 (Portugal)	Act 4 (Spain)	Act 5 (Germany)	Act 6 (United Kingdom)	Act 7 (United States)	Act 8 (Mexico)	Overall points
1	(Denmark) SAP Extreme Sailing Team	12	9	12	10	11	12	12	20	98
2	(Switzerland) Alinghi	11	12	11	9	7	11	11	24	96
3	Oman Air	10	10	10	12	12	10	9	22	95
4	(Austria) Red Bull Sailing Team	9	8	9	11	10	9	10	18	84
5	(United Kingdom) Land Rover BAR Academy	7	11	7	7	8	7	7	16	70
6	(New Zealand) NZ Extreme Sailing Team	8	7	8	8	9	8	8	14	70
