= Kyle Langford =

Kyle Langford may refer to:

- Kyle Langford (footballer) (born 1996), Australian rules footballer
- Kyle Langford (runner) (born 1996), British middle-distance runner
- Kyle Langford (sailor) (born 1989), Australian sailor
