= M32 (catamaran) =

Class of sailing catamaran

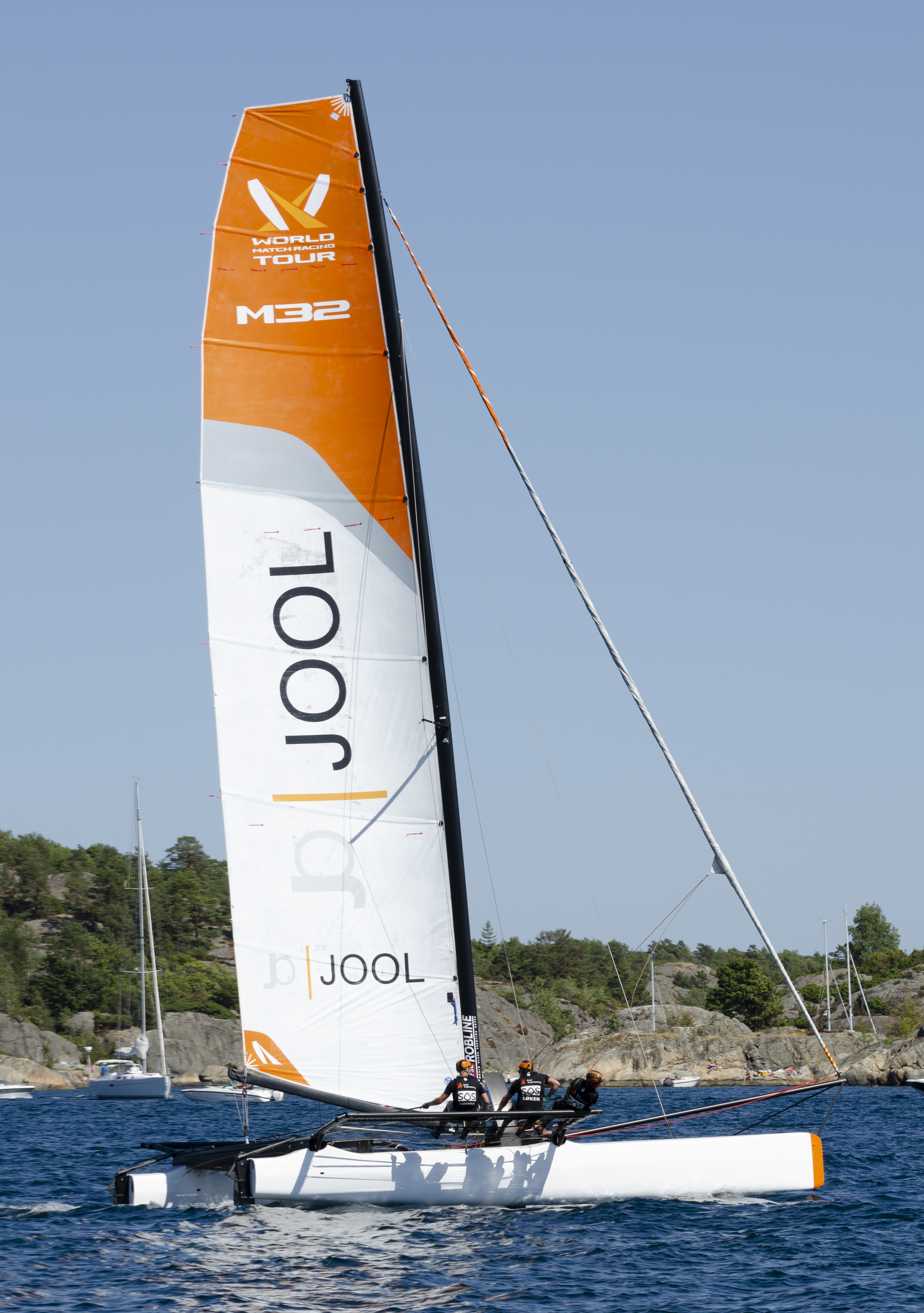
- M32 in Match Cup Norway (2018)

Development
- Designer: Göran Marström & Kåre Ljung
- Location: Sweden
- Year: 2010
- Builder: Aston Harald Composite AB
- Name: M32

Boat
- Crew: 4-5
- Displacement: 510 kg (1,120 lb)

Hull
- General: 2 hulls
- Type: Multihull
- Construction: Carbon Fibre/Nomex core
- Hull weight: 82 kg (181 lb) each
- LOA: 9.68 m (31.8 ft)
- Beam: 5.54 m (18.2 ft); (incl. racks/side wings 8.35 m (27.4 ft))
- Engine: none

Hull appendages
- Keel: daggerboards

Rig
- Rig type: Sloop
- Mast height: 16.8 m (55 ft)

Sails
- Mainsail area: 52 m^{2} (560 sq ft)
- Gennaker area: 61 m^{2} (660 sq ft)
- Total sail area: 113 m^{2} (1,220 sq ft)

The M32 (formerly the Marstsrom 32) is a class of sailing catamaran designed by Göran Marström and Kåre Ljung and first built in 2010 by Marstrom Composite AB. The design and production rights were sold in 2013 to Aston Harald Composite AB led by Håkan Svensson and run by Killian Bushe.

== Design ==
The M32 is a lightweight, all-carbon, high-performance, one-design multihull. Each of the two hulls - constructed of carbon fiber over a Nomex core - weighs 82 kg (181 lb) and features increased forward buoyancy to reduce nose-diving. The boat weighs 510 kg (1,124 lb) overall and carries a sail area of 52 m^{2} (560 sq ft) resulting in a very high sail area to weight ratio.

The sail plan includes only a high aspect ratio, fully battened mainsail for upwind sailing combined with a furling gennaker for downwind sailing.

== Events ==
=== World Championship ===
| Year | Gold | Silver | Bronze |
|---|---|---|---|
| 2017 Marstrand | Phil Robertson (NZL) | Denmark; Jonas Warrer | New Zealand; Chris Steele |
| 2018 Chicago | Phil Robertson (NZL) | United States; Rick DeVos | Netherlands; Pieter Taselaar |
| 2019 Riva del Garda | United States; Don Wilson | Netherlands; Pieter Taselaar | United States; Jennifer Wilson |
| 2021 Miami | Don Wilson (USA) | Anthony Kotoun (USA); Joel Ronning (USA) | Sweden; Richard Goransson |
| 2022 Cascais | United States; Don Wilson | United States; Dan Cheresh | United States; Larry Phillips |
| 2023 | Jake Julien; Keith Swinton; Rhys Mara; Julius Hallstrom; Jeff McCooey | | |
| 2024 Riva del Garda | USA #69 - Rated X Jake Julien USA; Keith Swinton AUS; Rhys Mara AUS; Julius Hallström SWE; Jeff McCoey USA | | |
| 2025 Miami | Surge; Ryan McKillen; Taylor Canfield; Sam Loughborough; Stewart Dodson; Luke Payne | | |

== See also ==
- List of sailing boat types

Similar sailboats

- Extreme 40
- GC32
- Nacra 17
- Tornado (sailboat)
