= 2012 Extreme Sailing Series =

2012 international sailing events

Event title
- Edition: 6th
- Dates: 28 February–2 December 2012
- Yachts: Extreme 40

Results
- Winner: (Oman) The Wave, Muscat

The 2012 Extreme Sailing Series was the sixth year of the series and the second year of it being a fully global event. The series started in Muscat, Oman on 28 February and ended in Rio de Janeiro, Brazil on 29 November and was scheduled to take place in 8 cities and 3 continents.

== Acts ==
Ports visited

=== Act 1: Muscat, Oman ===
The starting act of the 2012 series was held in Muscat, Oman on the weekend of 28 February and 2 March 2012 and was won by Oman Air.

=== Act 2: Qingdao, China ===
The second act of the series, which was held in Qingdao, China was held between 19 and 22 April 2012 and was won by The Wave, Muscat.

China entered a local 'wild card' entry into this act.

=== Act 3: Istanbul, Turkey ===
The third act of 2012 was held in Istanbul, Turkey on the weekend of 7–10 June 2012 and was won by The Wave, Muscat.

=== Act 4: Porto, Portugal ===
The fourth act, held between 5–8 July 2012, took place in Porto, Portugal and was won by The Wave, Muscat.

=== Act 5: Cardiff, UK ===
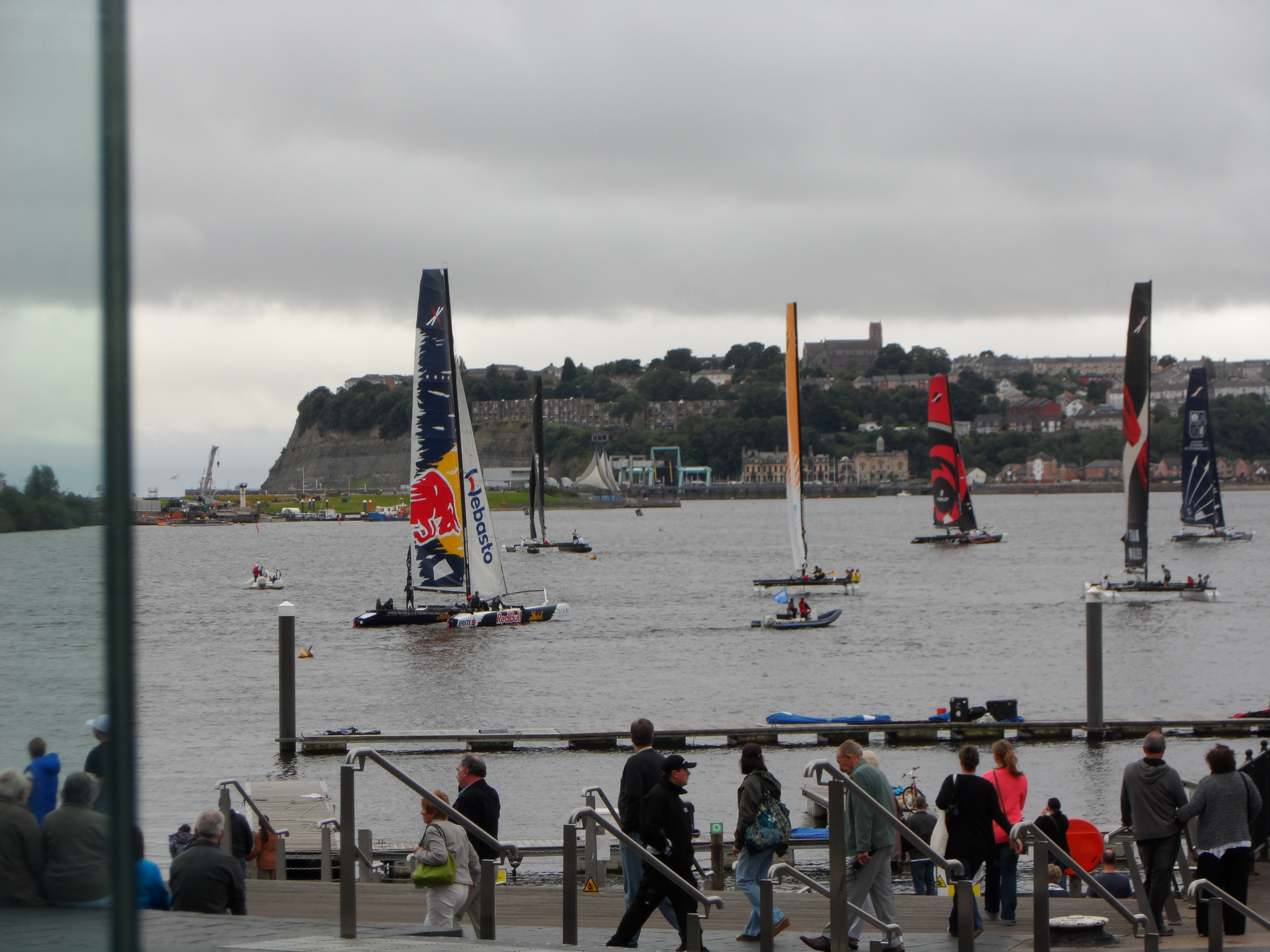
Extreme sailing, Cardiff bay

The fifth act of 2012 was in Cardiff, Wales, the first of a three-year deal to host the event there. The event, originally scheduled to be held over the August bank holiday, actually took place the weekend after, between 31 August and 2 September 2012. This act was won by Oman Air.

Cardiff entered a local 'wildcard' team into this act.

=== Act 6: Trapani, Italy ===
Act 6, which was scheduled to take place between 13 and 16 September, did not take place as the Province of Trapani and the regional government of Sicily failed to execute their obligations necessary for hosting the event.

=== Act 7: Nice, France ===
The seventh act took place in Nice, France between 18 and 21 October 2012 and was won by Groupe Edmond de Rothschild.

=== Act 8: Rio de Janeiro, Brazil ===
Act 8, which took place in Rio de Janeiro, Brazil between 29 November and 2 December 2012. As the final act of the series, a lot was in the balance as the whole series had been closely contested. The Wave, Muscat won the Brazilian act by 0.2 points, and also took the overall trophy.

Brazil entered a local 'wildcard' team into this act.

== Teams ==
=== Core Teams ===
==== Alinghi ====
Alinghi is a professional sports team that was created in 2000 by Ernesto Bertarelli in order to compete in the 31st America's Cup in Auckland, New Zealand.

Their team consisted of Ernesto Bertarelli (Skipper/Helm), Jean-Christophe Mourniac (Tactician), Pierre-Yves Jorand (Mainsail Trim), Nils Frei (Headsail Trim) and Yves Detry (Bowman).

==== GAC Pindar ====
GAC Pindar, in its second year sailing Extreme 40's, is a long-time sailing team competing in the World Match Racing Tour and supporting numerous sailors across all levels of the sport.

Their team consisted of Ian Williams/Andrew Walsh (Skipper/Helm), Anna Tunnicliffe (Tactician), Mark Bulkeley (Mainsail Trim), Adam Piggott (Headsail Trim) and Rick Peacock (Bowman).

==== Groupe Edmond de Rothschild ====
A team from the Rothschild family, the Gitana Team started in 1876, and entered the Extreme Sailing Series for the first time in 2009.

Their team consisted of Pierre Pennec (Skipper/Helm), Arnaud Psarofaghis (Tactician), Hervé Cunningham/Hervé Cunningham (Mainsail Trim), Romain Petit (Headsail Trim) and Bernard Labro/Bernard Labro (Bowman).

==== Oman Air ====
This Oman Sail entry is sponsored by the national airline Oman Air.

Their team consisted of Morgan Larson (Skipper/Helm), Will Howden (Tactician), Charlie Ogletree (Mainsail Trim), Andy Maloney/Max Bulger (Headsail Trim) and Nasser Al Mashari (Bowman).

==== Red Bull Sailing Team ====
Red Bull, who have been in the series since 2009, finished 6th in the 2011 series.

The crew consisted of Roman Hagara (Skipper/Helm), Hans-Peter Steinacher (Tactician), Matthew Adams (Mainsail Trim), Pierre Le Clainche (Headsail Trim) and Graeme Spenceras (Bowman).

==== SAP Extreme Sailing Team ====
A new entry to the 2012 series, SAP Extreme Sailing Team is also an event partner and is the only team to have co-skippers in 2012.

The crew consisted of Jes Gram-Hansen (Co-skipper/Helm), Rasmus Kostner (Co-skipper/Tactician), Pete Cumming (Mainsail Trim), Mikkel Rossberg (Headsail Trim) and Jonas Hviid (Bowman).

==== The Wave, Muscat ====
This is the second team sponsored by Oman Sail. They won the 2010 series.

The crew consisted of Leigh McMillan (Skipper/Helm), Ed Smyth (Tactician), Pete Greenhalgh/Rachel Williamson (Mainsail Trim), Bleddyn Mon (Headsail Trim), and Hashim Al Rashdi (Bowman).

==== Zoulou ====
Zoulou, a private entry to the 2012 series is skippered and helmed by a previous 2009 crew.

The team consisted of Erik Maris/Fred Le Peutrec/Loïck Peyron (Skipper/Helm), Philippe Mourniac (Tactician), Jean-Sebastien Ponce (Mainsail Trim), Patrick Aucour (Headsail Trim) and Bruno Jeanjean (Bowman).

=== Wildcard entries ===
==== China Team ====
The Chinese 'wildcard' entry was crewed by Phil Robertson (Skipper/Helm), Garth Ellingham (Mainsail Trim), Kit Cheng (Headsail Trim), Nick Catley (Bowman) and Song Xiaqun.

==== Team Wales ====
Team Wales consisted of Dave Evans (Skipper/Tactician), Tudur Owen (Co-Skipper/Trimmer), Torvar Mirsky (Helm), Ed Powys (Bowman) and Hannah Mills (Strategist) with Kate MacGregor as reserve crew.

==== Team Brasil ====
Team Brasil was the local 'wildcard' entry, crewed by Torben Grael (Skipper/Tactician), Alex Welter (Helm), Diogo Cayolla (Mainsail Trim), André Mirsky (Headsail Trim) and Marco Grael (Bowman).

== Results ==
Position	Team	Act 1	Act 2	Act 3	Act 4	Act 5	Act 6	Act 7	Act 8	Overall points
1	(Oman) The Wave, Muscat	2	1	1	1	2	–	2	1	76.5
2	Oman Air	1	5	4	3	1	–	3	3	65
3	(France) Groupe Edmund de Rothschild	3	3	2	5	6	–	1	2	64.5
4	(Austria) Red Bull Sailing Team	4	2	3	2	3	–	6	4	59
5	(United Kingdom) GAC Pindar	5	4	6	7	4	–	4	7	45.5
6	(Denmark) SAP Extreme Sailing Team	8	7	5	6	5	–	5	5	42
7	(Switzerland) Alinghi	7	8	7	4	7	–	7	6	35.5
8	(France) Zoulou	6	6	8	8	8	–	8	8	28
