= 2013 Extreme Sailing Series =

2013 international sailing events

Event title
- Edition: 7th
- Dates: 5 March–17 November 2013
- Yachts: Extreme 40

Results
- Winner: (Oman) The Wave, Muscat

The 2013 Extreme Sailing Series was the seventh year of the series and the third year of it being a fully global event. The series started in Muscat, Oman on 5 March 2013 and ended in Florianópolis, Brazil on 17 November 2013 and took place in 8 cities and across 3 continents.

== Acts ==
Ports visited

=== Act 1: Muscat, Oman ===
The starting act of the 2013 series was held in Muscat, Oman on the weekend of 5–8 March 2013.

=== Act 2: Singapore ===
The second act of the series was back in Singapore this year, and took place between 11 and 14 April 2013.

=== Act 3: Qingdao, China ===
The third act of 2013 was held in Qingdao, China on the weekend of 2–5 May 2013.

=== Act 4: Istanbul, Turkey ===
The fourth act took place in Istanbul, Turkey. Originally it was planned to be held between 20 and 23 June 2013, but had been postponed indefinitely.

=== Act 5: Porto, Portugal ===
Act 5 was held in Porto, Portugal on the weekend of 25–28 July 2013.

=== Act 6: Cardiff, UK ===
The fifth act of 2013 was in Cardiff, Wales, the second of a three-year deal to host the event there. The event was scheduled to be held over the August bank holiday, 23–26 August 2013.

=== Act 7: Nice, France ===
The seventh act took place in Nice, France between 3–6 October 2013.

=== Act 8: Florianópolis, Brazil ===
Act 8, took place in Florianópolis, Brazil between 14 and 17 November 2013

== Teams ==
=== Core Teams ===
==== Alinghi ====
Alinghi is a professional sports team that was created in 2000 by Ernesto Bertarelli in order to compete in the 31st America's Cup.

Their team consisted of Ernesto Bertarelli (Skipper), Morgan Larson (Skipper/Helm), Stuart Pollard/Anna Tunnicliffe/Ben Lezin (Tactician), Pierre-Yves Jorand (Mainsail Trim), Nils Frei (Headsail Trim) and Yves Detry (Bowman).

==== ChinaSpirit ====
ChinaSpirit entered the series late, and competed in the Cardiff, Nice and Florianópolis acts.

Their team consisted of Phil Robertson (Skipper/Helm), Garth Ellingham (Tactician), Llang Wu (Mainsail Trim), James Williamson/Louis Viat (Headsail Trim) and Nick Catley (Bowman).

==== GAC Pindar ====
GAC Pindar, in its third year sailing Extreme 40's, is a long-time sailing team competing in the World Match Racing Tour and supporting numerous sailors across all levels of the sport. The team this year will be skippered by William Tiller, an experienced match racer from New Zealand with the rest of the team consisting of Matt Steven (Tactician), Harry Thurston/Stewart Dodson (Mainsail Trim), Brad Farrand (Headsail Trim) and Shaun Mason/Ash Hammond (Bowman).

==== Red Bull Sailing Team ====
Skippered by Roman Hagara, Red Bull is another regular who has been competing in the Extreme Sailing Series for a number of years.

==== SAP Extreme Sailing Team ====
With skippers Rasmus Kostner and Jes Gram-Hansen sharing the duties this year, SAP is in its second year of the series.

==== Team Korea ====
Team Korea was a new team for 2013, skippered by Peter Burling

==== The Wave, Muscat ====
The Wave, Muscat were the 2012 champions of the Extreme Sailing Series and are back again, with their skipper Leigh McMillan.

==== Realteam ====
A new team for 2013, Realteam will be skippered by Jérôme Clerc who led his D35 catamarans team to victory in 2012 and who has now turned his sights to Extreme 40's.

=== Invitational Teams ===
As in previous years, host cities have the opportunity to enter their own entry into their home act. This year, all 'wildcard' entries will be amalgamated to give an overall score at the end of the series.

==== Act 1 team: Team Duqm Oman ====
Team Duqm Oman is the first invitational team of 2013 skippered by Robert Greenhalgh, the winner of the first-ever Extreme Sailing Series in 2007 (helming Basilica). The rest of the crew are Bleddyn Mon (Tactician), Will Howden (Mainsail trim), Andrew Walsh (Headsail trim) and Nasser Al Mashari (Bowman).

==== Act 2 team: Team Aberdeen Singapore ====
Team Aberdeen Singapore's crew consisted of Scott Glen Sydney (skipper/Tactician), Robert Greenhalgh (Helm), Andrew Walsh (Mainsail Trim), Justin Wong (Headsail Trim) and Rick Peacock (Bowman).

==== Act 3 team: China Team ====
China Team's crew consisted of Mitch Booth (Co-skipper/Helm), Wen Zijin (Co-skipper/Tactician), Yingkit Cheng (Mainsail Trim), Liu Xue (Headsail Trim) and Zhang Yiran (Bowman).

==== Act 5 team: ROFF Cascais ====
This Portuguese team consisted of António Mello (skipper/Tactician), Bernardo Freitas (Helm), João Mello (Mainsail Trim), Ricardo Schedel (Headsail Trim) and João Matos Rosa (Bowman).

==== Act 6 team: Team Wales Land Rover ====
Competing for the second year, Team Wales consisted of Dave Evans (Skipper/Helm), Chris Grube/Bleddyn Mon (Tactician), Will Howden (Mainsail Trim), Tudur Owen (Headsail Trim) and Trystan Seal (Bowman).

==== Act 7 team: ALL4ONE ====
This French team consisted of Jean-Christophe Mourniac (skipper/Helm), Romain Petit (Tactician), Stéphane Christidis (Mainsail Trim), Arnaud Jarlegant (Headsail Trim) and Julien Cressant (Bowman).

==== Act 8 team: Team Brazil Mapfre ====
Team Brazil's crew consisted of Clínio de Freitas (skipper/Helm) with Cláudia Swan, André Mirsky, André Chang, Daniel Santiago and Bruno di Bernardi.

== Results ==
| Rank | Team | Act 1 | Act 2 | Act 3 | Act 4 | Act 5 | Act 6 | Act 7 | Act 8 | Overall points |
|---|---|---|---|---|---|---|---|---|---|---|
| 1 | (Oman) The Wave, Muscat | 10 | 6 | 10 | - | 10 | 10 | 10 | 18 | 74 |
| 2 | (Switzerland) Alinghi | 8 | 10 | 9 | - | 9 | 9 | 9 | 20 | 74 |
| 3 | (Austria) Red Bull Sailing Team | 9 | 9 | 6 | - | 6 | 7 | 8 | 16 | 61 |
| 4 | (Denmark) SAP Extreme Sailing Team | 4 | 8 | 8 | - | 7 | 8 | 6 | 10 | 51 |
| 5 | (Switzerland) Realteam | 3 | 7 | 4 | - | 8 | 6 | 7 | 14 | 49 |
| 6 | (United Kingdom) GAC Pindar | 5 | 4 | 7 | - | 5 | 5 | 4 | 12 | 42 |
| 7 | Invitational Team | 7 (Note: Duqm Oman) | 3 (Note: Team Aberdeen Singapore) | 3 (Note: China Team) | - | 4 (Note: ROFF Cascais) | 4 (Note: Team Wales Land Rover) | 5 (Note: ALL4ONE) | 8 (Note: Team Brazil Mapfre) | 34 |
| 8 | (South Korea) Team Korea | 6 | 5 | 5 | - | - | - | - | - | 16 |

Invitational teams
