= RCYC =

RCYC may refer to:

- Royal Canadian Yacht Club, Toronto
- Royal Cape Yacht Club, Cape Town, South Africa
- Royal Clyde Yacht Club, Scotland
- Royal Corinthian Yacht Club, Essex, England
- Royal Cork Yacht Club, Ireland, possibly the world's oldest yacht club
- Royal Cornwall Yacht Club, Falmouth, England
