= GC32 Racing Tour =

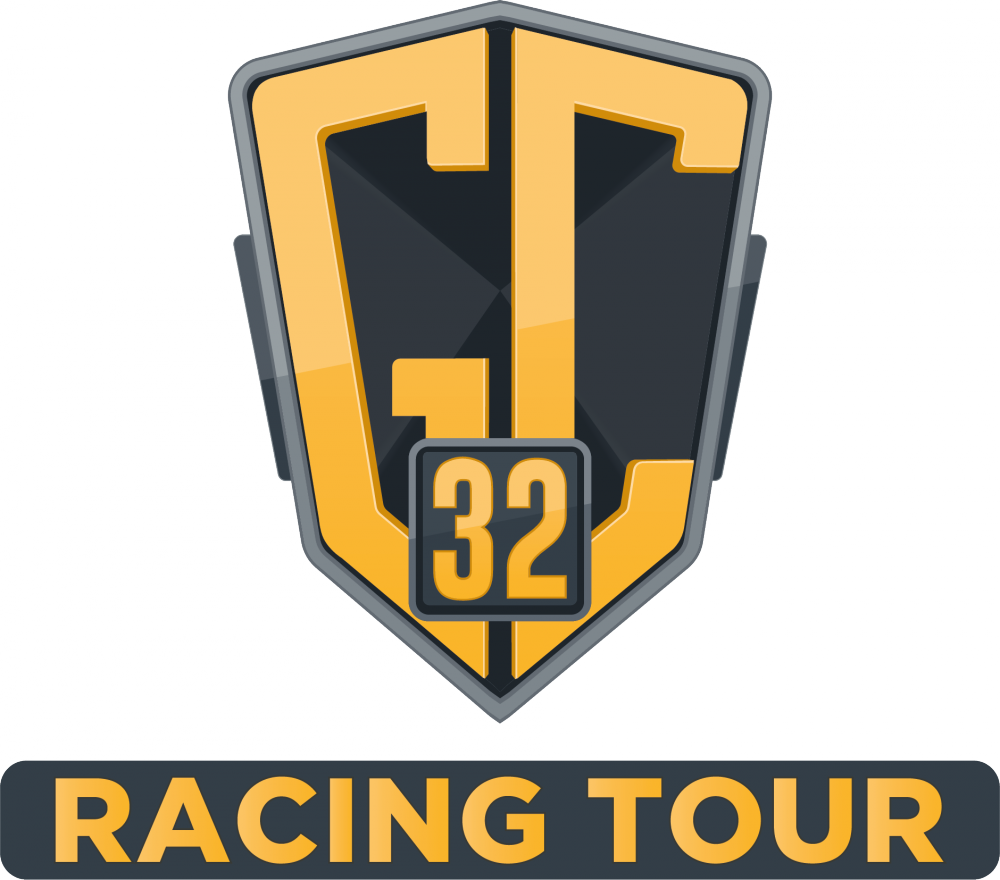
- First held: 2014
- Organizer: GC32 Racing
- Classes: GC32 (2014–present)
- Champions: Realteam (2017)
- Website: www.gc32racingtour.com

GC32 Racing Tour is a southern European-centered sailing boat circuit for GC32 one design foiling catamarans. It attracts both private owner-driven teams and those that are commercially-backed.

== History ==
The aim of the circuit is to provide the 'best foiling catamaran experience' for its participants. This includes visiting venues known to provide optimum wind conditions for foiling and race courses large enough to enable the boats to hit maximum speeds. The GC32 Racing Tour has several features in common with the 34th and 35th America's Cup in that it uses foiling catamarans and a similar race format which often includes reaching (rather than upwind) starts.

The circuit comprises five events. At each event and for the overall championship, prizes are awarded for the overall winner as well as the top 'owner-driver'. GC32 Racing Tour events also include the Anonimo Speed Challenge in which teams try to sail the fastest over a course that comprises two reaching legs with a gybe in between.

== Events ==
=== 2016 GC32 Racing Tour ===
- 26–29 May: GC32 Riva Cup / Riva del Garda, Italy
- 7–10 July: GC32 Malcesine Cup
- 3–6 August: 35 Copa del Rey MAPFRE / Palma de Mallorca, Spain
- 22–25 September: La Reserva The Sotogrande
- 13–16 October: Marseille One Design

=== 2017 GC32 Racing Tour ===
- 11–14 May: GC32 Riva Cup / Riva del Garda, Italy
- 28 June - 1 July: GC32 Villasimius Cup / Villasimius, Sardinia, Italy
- 2–5 August: 36 Copa del Rey MAPFRE / Palma de Mallorca, Spain
- 13–16 September: GC32 Orezza Corsica Cup / Corsica, France
- 12–15 October: Marseille One Design / Marseille, France

=== 2018 GC32 Racing Tour ===
- 23–27 May: GC32 World Championship / Riva del Garda, Italy
- 27 June-1 July: GC32 Lagos Cup / Lagos, Portugal
- 31 July – 4 August: 37 Copa del Rey MAPFRE/ Palma de Mallorca, Spain
- 12–16 September: GC32 Villasimius Cup / Villasimius, Sardinia, Italy
- 10–14 October: GC32 TPM Med Cup / Toulon, France

=== 2019 GC32 Racing Tour ===
- 22–26 May: Villasimius Cup / Villasimius, Sardinia, Italy
- 26–30 June: GC32 World Championship / Lagos, Portugal
- 31 July - 4 August: 38 Copa del Rey MAPFRE / Palma de Mallorca, Spain
- 11–15 September: GC32 Riva Cup / Riva del Garda, Italy
- 6–10 November: GC32 Oman Cup / Muscat, Oman

=== 2020 GC32 Racing Tour ===
- 25–29 March: GC32 Oman Cup / Muscat, Oman (Cancelled due to the COVID-19 pandemic)
- 27–31 May: GC32 Riva Cup / Riva del Garda, Italy
- 24–28 June: GC32 Lagos Cup / Lagos, Portugal
- 16–20 September: GC32 World Championship / Villasimius, Sardinia, Italy
- 21–25 October: GC32 Season Finale / Location TBA

== Results ==
=== 2017 Results ===
Rank	Team	Total	Event 1	Event 2	Event 3	Event 4	Event 5
1	Realteam	10	1	2	3	1	3
2	Argo	16	4	1	2	2	7
3	Mamma Aiuto!	17	6	3	1	5	2
4	Team ENGIE	24	3	5	7	3	6
5	Malizia - Yacht Club de Monaco	25	7	6	4	4	4
6	Zoulou	34	10	10	6	7	1
7	I'M Racing Movistar	34	5	4	5	10	10
8	ARMIN STROM Sailing Team	38	2	7	9	10	10
9	.film Racing	39	10	10	8	6	5

=== 2019 Results ===
Rank	Team	Total	Event 1	Event 2	Event 3	Event 4	Event 5
1	Alinghi	7	2	1	2	1	1
2	Oman Air	10	1	2	1	2	4
3	Red Bull Sailing Team	16	3	4	3	3	3
4	ZouLou	19	4	5	4	4	2
5	Argo	26	5	3	DNC/7	5	6
6	Black Star Sailing Team	28	6	6	5	6	5
