= Louis Vuitton World Series =

The Louis Vuitton World Series may designate:

- the 2008 Louis Vuitton Pacific Series
- the 2009 Louis Vuitton Trophy
- the 2011–13 America's Cup World Series
- the 2015–16 America's Cup World Series
