= Mike Drummond =

New Zealand sailor and yacht designer

Mike Drummond is a New Zealand sailor and yacht designer who is a member of the America's Cup Hall of Fame.

Drummond was born in Christchurch and joined New Zealand Challenge before the 1987 America's Cup and he then helped to design, and sail on, KZ 1 during the 1988 America's Cup. He remained with the team for the 1992 America's Cup.

He joined Team New Zealand and was part of the design and sailing teams when they won the 1995 America's Cup. He sailed in one race.

Drummond was a navigator and sailed in two races during the 2000 America's Cup as navigator and also sailed in the 2003 America's Cup campaign.

Drummond then joined Alinghi for the 2007 America's Cup.

He later joined Oracle Racing as their design director and was involved in designing USA 17 for the 2010 America's Cup and the AC45 class for the 2013 America's Cup.

In 2010, he was inducted into the America's Cup Hall of Fame.

Drummond also designs and sails his own International A-class catamaran. He competed in the 2014 World Championships in Takapuna. In 2017 he assisted the NZ Extreme Sailing Team in the 2017 Extreme Sailing Series.
