= 2011–2013 America's Cup World Series =

America's Cup World Series
- Sport: Sailing
- Founded: 2011
- No. of teams: 8
- Country: New Zealand; United States; France; Sweden; Spain; China; South Korea; United Kingdom; Italy
- Related competitions: America's Cup, Louis Vuitton Cup

The inaugural America's Cup World Series were held between 2011 and 2013 in the lead up to the 2013 America's Cup. They were raced in AC45 catamarans. The competition was rocked by a cheating scandal in which Oracle Team USA had made an unauthorized modification by using additional ballast. The team withdrew from the competition on 8 August 2013. Penalties imposed included expelling three team members, a $250,000 fine, and a one-point penalty for each of the first two races of the Match in which they would otherwise score a point. This also affected boats on loan to Ben Ainslie Racing and HS Racing, which withdrew from the competition. After reallocating points, overall winner for 2011/2012 was declared to be Team New Zealand, and for 2012/2013 it was Luna Rossa Piranha.

== Teams ==
| Club | Team | Helmsman | Sail loft |
|---|---|---|---|
| (South Korea) Sail Korea Yacht Club | Team Korea | (United Kingdom) ~~Chris Draper~~ (Australia) ~~Nathan Outteridge~~ (New Zealand) Peter Burling | Doyle Sailmakers |
| (Sweden) Royal Swedish Yacht Club | Artemis Racing White | (United States) ~~Terry Hutchinson~~ (Sweden) Charlie Ekberg | North Sails |
| (Sweden) Royal Swedish Yacht Club | Artemis Racing Red | (Argentina) Santiago Lange (Australia) Nathan Outteridge | North Sails |
| Royal New Zealand Yacht Squadron | Team New Zealand | (New Zealand) Dean Barker | North Sails |
| (United States) Golden Gate Yacht Club | Oracle Racing 4 | (Australia) James Spithill (Australia) Tom Slingsby | North Sails |
| (United States) Golden Gate Yacht Club | Oracle Racing 5 HS Racing | (New Zealand) Russell Coutts (Australia) Darren Bundock (Austria) Roman Hagara | North Sails |
| (China) Měi Fán Yacht Club | China Team | (Netherlands) Mitch Booth (United States) ~~Charlie Ogletree~~ (France) ~~Frédéric le Peutrec~~ (New Zealand) ~~Philip Robertson~~ | UK Sailmakers |
| Yacht Club de France | Energy Team | (France) ~~Loïck Peyron~~ (France) Yann Guichard | Voilerie Incidences |
| (France) Aleph Yacht Club | ~~Aleph Sailing Team~~ (defunct) | (France) Bertrand Pacé (France) Pierre Pennec | North Sails |
| (Spain) Real Club Náutico de Valencia | ~~Green Comm Racing~~ (defunct) | (Slovenia) Vasilij Žbogar | North Sails |
| (Italy) Circolo della Vela Sicilia | Luna Rossa Piranha | (United Kingdom) Chris Draper | North Sails |
| (Italy) Circolo della Vela Sicilia | Luna Rossa Swordfish | (United Kingdom) Paul Campbell-James (Spain) ~~Iker Martínez de Lizarduy~~ (Italy) Francesco Bruni | North Sails |
| (United Kingdom) Royal Cornwall Yacht Club | Ben Ainslie Racing | (United Kingdom) Ben Ainslie | North Sails |

== AC45 World Series ==
2011–12 AC45 World Series
| Team | Cascais 6–14 August 2011 | | Plymouth 10–18 September 2011 | | San Diego 12–20 November 2011 | | Naples 11–15 April 2012 | | Venice 15–20 May 2012 | | Newport 26 June – 1 July 2012 | | Standings | | |
| Team | match race | fleet race | match race | fleet race | match race | fleet race | match race | fleet race | match race | fleet race | match race | fleet race | match race | fleet race | total |
|---|---|---|---|---|---|---|---|---|---|---|---|---|---|---|---|
| (United States) Oracle Racing 4 | 10 | 8 | 6 | 10 | 10 | 10 | 4 | 9 | 8 | 9 | DSQ (9) | DSQ (9) | (47) | (55) | (102) |
| Team New Zealand | 9 | 10 | 10 | 9 | 8 | 9 | 3 | 8 | 6 | 8 | 5 | 8 | 41 | 52 | 93 |
| (Sweden) Artemis Racing White | 8 | 9 | 8 | DNF 3 | 7 | 5 | 10 | 4 | 10 | 7 | 7 | 4 | 50 | 32 | 82 |
| (France) Energy Team | 5 | 3 | 5 | 5 | 9 | 8 | 6 | 7 | 7 | 10 | 6 | 3 | 38 | 36 | 74 |
| (United States) Oracle Racing 5 | 6 | 7 | 7 | 8 | 5 | 3 | 8 | 3 | 3 | 3 | DSQ (10) | DSQ (5) | (39) | (29) | (68) |
| (South Korea) Team Korea | 7 | 4 | 9 | 6 | 4 | 6 | 5 | 6 | 5 | 4 | 3 | 7 | 33 | 33 | 66 |
| (Italy) Luna Rossa Piranha | – | – | – | – | – | – | 9 | 10 | 9 | 6 | 8 | 10 | 26 | 26 | 52 |
| (Italy) Luna Rossa Swordfish | – | – | – | – | – | – | 7 | 5 | 4 | 5 | 4 | 6 | 15 | 16 | 31 |
| Aleph-Equipe de France | 3 | 5 | 3 | 7 | 6 | 7 | – | – | – | – | – | – | 12 | 19 | 31 |
| China Team | 3 | 3 | 3 | 4 | 3 | 4 | 3 | 3 | 3 | 2 | – | – | 15 | 16 | 31 |
| (Spain) Green Comm Racing | 4 | 6 | 4 | DNS 3 | 3 | 3 | – | – | – | – | – | – | 11 | 12 | 23 |

2012–13 AC45 World Series
| Team | San Francisco 21–26 August 2012 | | San Francisco 2–7 October 2012 | | Naples 16–21 April 2013 | | Standings | | |
| Team | match race | fleet race | match race | fleet race | match race | fleet race | match race | fleet race | total |
|---|---|---|---|---|---|---|---|---|---|
| (United States) Oracle Racing 4 | DSQ (9) | DSQ (86) | DSQ (10) | DSQ (79) | DSQ (10) | DSQ (80) | DSQ (29) | DSQ (245) | DSQ (274) |
| (Italy) Luna Rossa Piranha | 5 | 85 | 1 | 36 | 7 | 70 | 13 | 191 | 204 |
| (United Kingdom) Ben Ainslie Racing | DSQ (3) | DSQ (37) | DSQ (4) | DSQ (79) | DSQ (8) | DSQ (65) | DSQ (15) | DSQ (181) | DSQ (196) |
| Team New Zealand | 7 | 43 | 9 | 57 | 6 | 71 | 22 | 171 | 193 |
| (Sweden) Artemis Racing White | 8 | 48 | 8 | 72 | 5 | 40 | 21 | 160 | 181 |
| (France) Energy Team | 6 | 55 | 5 | 47 | 4 | 58 | 15 | 160 | 175 |
| (Italy) Luna Rossa Swordfish | 4 | 51 | 1 | 20 | 9 | 80 | 14 | 151 | 165 |
| (United States) Oracle Racing 5 | DSQ (10) | DSQ (42) | DSQ (6) | DSQ (56) | – | – | DSQ (16) | DSQ (98) | DSQ (114) |
| (South Korea) Team Korea | 2 | 65 | 3 | 40 | – | – | 5 | 105 | 110 |
| (Sweden) Artemis Racing Red | 1 | 38 | 7 | 52 | – | – | 8 | 90 | 98 |
| China Team | 1 | 15 | 2 | 28 | 2 | 30 | 5 | 73 | 78 |
| (United States) HS Racing | – | – | – | – | DSQ (3) | DSQ (36) | DSQ (3) | DSQ (36) | DSQ (39) |

- From the Newport AC45 World Series through all the second season of racing, all Oracle Racing boats (including those loaned to Ben Ainslie and HS Racing) were found to have raced out of measurement, with a 3 kg ballast surplus in the dolphin striker. All points are therefore subject to change and a new winner for both seasons to be declared.

== See also ==
- 2013 America's Cup
