= 2016 Extreme Sailing Series =

2016 international sailing events

Event title
- Edition: 10th
- Dates: 16 February–11 December 2016
- Yachts: GC32

Results
- Winner: (Switzerland) Alinghi

The 2016 Extreme Sailing Series was the tenth edition of the sailing series and the sixth year of it being a fully global event. 2016 saw the series move away from the Extreme 40 catamaran, and into the GC32 foiling catamaran.

== Acts ==
Ports visited

=== Act 1: Muscat, Oman ===
The first act of the series was held in Muscat, Oman on the weekend of 16–19 February 2016.

=== Act 2: Qingdao, China ===
Qingdao, China was the host of the second act of the 2016 series, on the weekend of 27 April–1 May 2016.

=== Act 3: Cardiff, UK ===
For the fifth time, Cardiff, Wales was again a host city, it was held on the weekend of 24–26 June 2016.

=== Act 4: Hamburg, Germany ===
Hamburg, Germany was, for the second time, a venue for the series, held on 14–17 July 2016.

=== Act 5: St. Petersburg, Russia ===
The fifth act was held in Saint Petersburg, Russia, the second time as a venue in the Extreme Sailing Series. It was held on the weekend of 25–28 August 2016.

=== Act 6: Madeira Islands, Portugal ===
The sixth act was held in Funchal at Madeira Island, for the first time, on the weekend of 22–25 October 2016.

=== Act 7: Lisbon, Portugal ===
Lisbon hosted the Series on the weekend of 6–9 October 2016. (Previously, it was scheduled to be in Istanbul, Turkey.)

=== Act 8: Sydney, Australia ===
Act 8 was held on the weekend of 8–11 December 2016 in Sydney, Australia. This was the third year that Sydney hosted the series.

== Teams ==
The crews included:

=== Alinghi ===
Co-Skipper/Helm: Ernesto Bertarelli (SUI) Co-Skipper/Mainsail Trimmer: Arnaud Psarofaghis (SUI) Tactician: Nicolas Charbonnier (FRA) Headsail Trimmer: Nils Frei (SUI) Bowman: Yves Detrey (SUI)

=== Land Rover BAR Academy ===
Skipper: Bleddyn Môn (GBR) Helm: Leigh McMillan (GBR) Crew: Ed Powys (GBR) Academy trialists: Adam Kay (GBR)/Oli Greber (GBR)/James Peters (GBR)/Neil Hunter (GBR)

=== Oman Air ===
Skipper/Helm: Morgan Larson (USA) Mainsail Trimmer: Pete Greenhalgh (GBR) Headsail Trimmer: Ed Smyth (NZL/AUS) Bowmen: Nasser Al Mashari (OMA)/James Wierzbowski (AUS)

=== Red Bull Sailing Team ===
Skipper/Helm: Roman Hagara (AUT) Tactician: Hans-Peter Steinacher (AUT) Mainsail Trimmer: Stewart Dodson (NZL) Headsail Trimmer: Adam Piggott (GBR) Bowman: Brad Farrand (NZL)

=== Sail Portugal ===
Skipper/Helm: Diogo Cayolla (POR) Tactician: Bernardo Freitas (POR) Mainsail Trimmer: Javier de la Plaza (ESP) Headsail Trimmer: Luís Brito (POR) Bowman: Winston Macfarlane (NZL)

=== SAP Extreme Sailing Team ===
Co-Skipper/Helm: Jes Gram-Hansen (DEN) Co-Skipper/Tactician: Rasmus Køstner (DEN) Mainsail Trimmer: Mads Emil Stephensen (DEN) Headsail Trimmer: Pierluigi De Felice (ITA) Bowman: Renato Conde (POR)

=== Team Turx ===
Co-Skipper/Floater: Edhem Dirvana (TUR) Co-Skipper/Helm: Stevie Morrison (GBR) Mainsail Trimmer: Cem Gözen (TUR) Headsail Trimmer: Alister Richardson (GBR) Bowman: Anil Berk Baki (TUR)

== Results ==
Results as of 28 May 2017.

| Rank | Team | Act 1 | Act 2 | Act 3 | Act 4 | Act 5 | Act 6 | Act 7 | Act 8 | Overall points |
|---|---|---|---|---|---|---|---|---|---|---|
| 1 | (Switzerland) Alinghi | 9 | 12 | 9 | 11 | 12 | 12 | 12 | 24 | 101 |
| 2 | Oman Air | 12 | 11 | 12 | 12 | 11 | 11 | 10 | 20 | 99 |
| 3 | (Austria) Red Bull Sailing Team | 11 | 10 | 11 | 10 | 10 | 10 | 11 | 18 | 91 |
| 4 | (Denmark) SAP Extreme Sailing Team | 8 | 7 | 10 | 9 | 9 | 9 | 9 | 22 | 83 |
| 5 | (United Kingdom) Land Rover BAR Academy | 10 | 9 | 6 | 6 | 8 | 7 | 8 | 16 | 70 |
| 6 | Sail Portugal-Visit Madeira | 5 | 8 | 7 | 7 | 7 | 8 | 7 | 14 | 63 |
| 7 | (China) CHINA One | 7 | 6 | 8 | 8 | DNS | DNS | DNS | DNS | 29 |
| 8 | (Turkey) Team Turx | 6 | 5 | DNS | DNS | DNS | DNS | DNS | DNS | 11 |

DNS = Did Not Start
