= Extreme Sailing Series =

- First held: 2007
- Organizer: OC Sport
- Classes: Extreme 40 (2007–2015); GC32 (2016–2018)
- Champions: Alinghi (2018)
- Most titles: Alinghi (4); The Wave, Muscat (4)
- Website: extremesailingseries.com

The Extreme Sailing Series (ESS) (formerly the iShares Cup) was an annual global racing series, organised by OC Sport, which ran from 2007 to 2018.

The series started in 2007 with its main attraction being the stadium racing which puts the race course inside a stadium environment for the ease of spectators' viewing.

Many of the sailors taking part in the series were around-the-world yachtsmen, Olympic medallists, America's Cup sailors, World and European champions and even world record holders.

The series was terminated in 2019 after the event became financially nonviable and OC Sport were unable to secure a management buy-out.

== Results ==
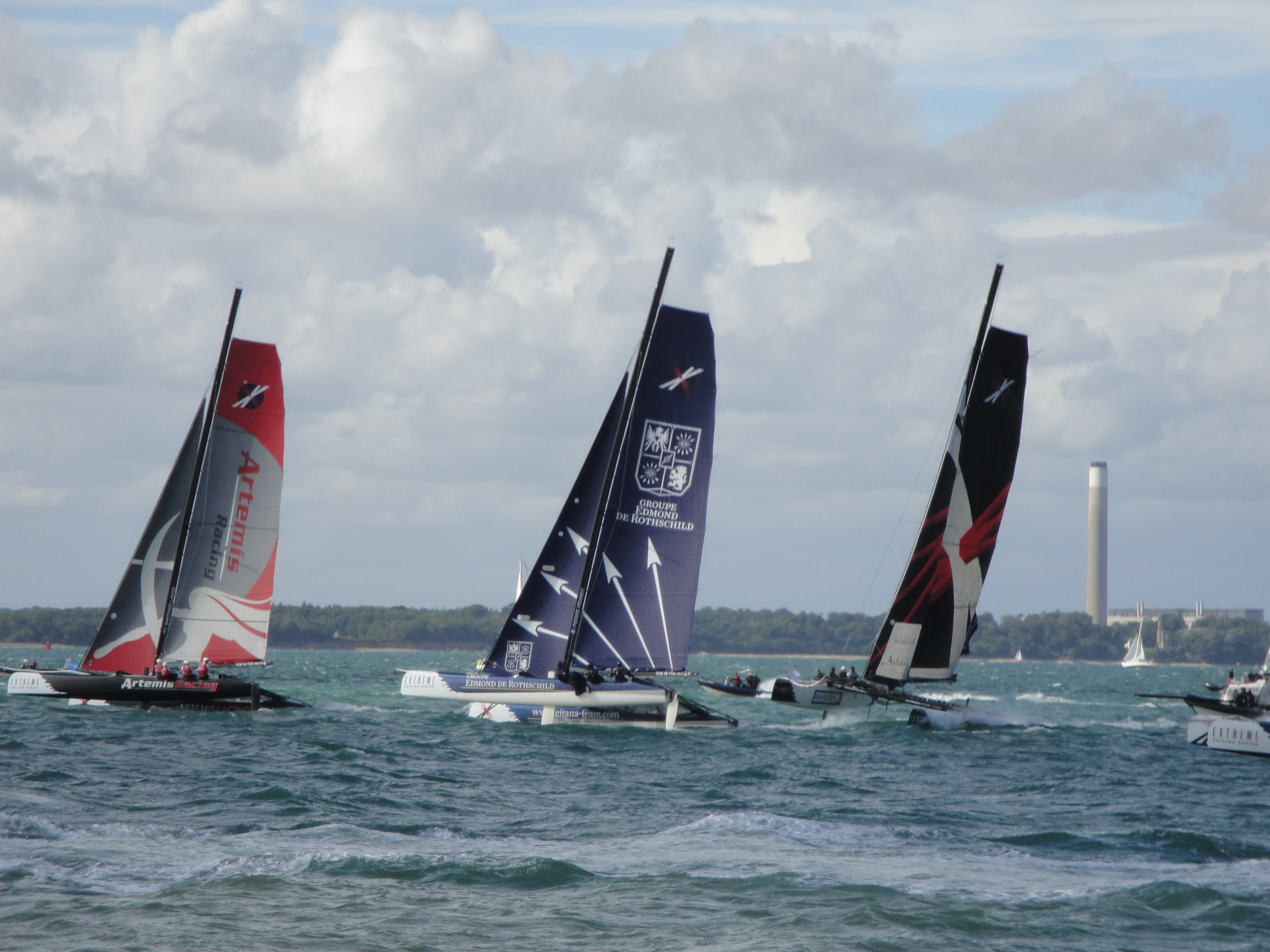
Extreme 40s at the 2011 edition in Cowes

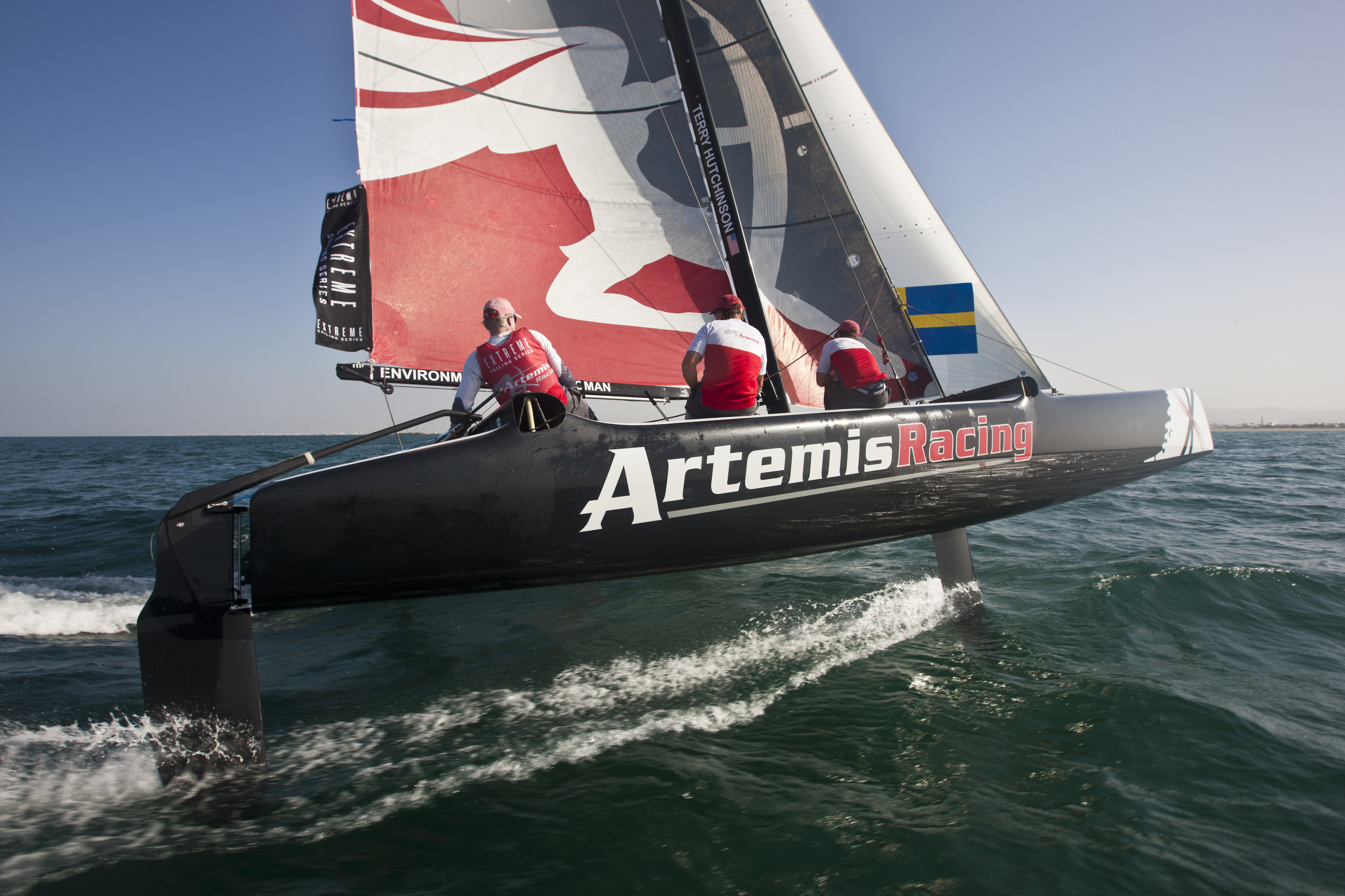
An Extreme 40 catamaran

Year	Venues	Entries	Winning team	Winning skipper
2007	6	9	(United Kingdom) Basilica	(United Kingdom) Rob Greenhalgh
2008	5	9	(Switzerland) Alinghi	(United States) Ed Baird
2009	6	9	Oman Sail Masirah	(United Kingdom) Pete Cumming
2010	5	8	(Oman) The Wave, Muscat	(United Kingdom) Paul Campbell-James
2011	9	11	(Italy) Luna Rossa	(Italy) Max Sirena
2012	7	8	(Oman) The Wave, Muscat	(United Kingdom) Leigh McMillan
2013	8	8	(Oman) The Wave, Muscat	(United Kingdom) Leigh McMillan
2014	8	11	(Switzerland) Alinghi	(United States) Morgan Larson
2015	8	8	(Oman) The Wave, Muscat	(United Kingdom) Leigh McMillan
2016	7	8	(Switzerland) Alinghi	(Switzerland) Arnaud Psarofaghis
2017	8	6	(Denmark) SAP Extreme Sailing Team	(Denmark) Jes Gram-Hansen & Rasmus Køstner
2018	8	6	(Switzerland) Alinghi	(Switzerland) Arnaud Psarofaghis

Based on results from 2007 to 2018, Pete Greenhalgh (GBR) is the most successful sailor from the series. He consistently finished on the podium, including 1st place in 2007 on Basilica, alongside his younger brother, Robert Greenhalgh.
