= 2019 SailGP championship =

International sailing competition

2019 SailGP Championship
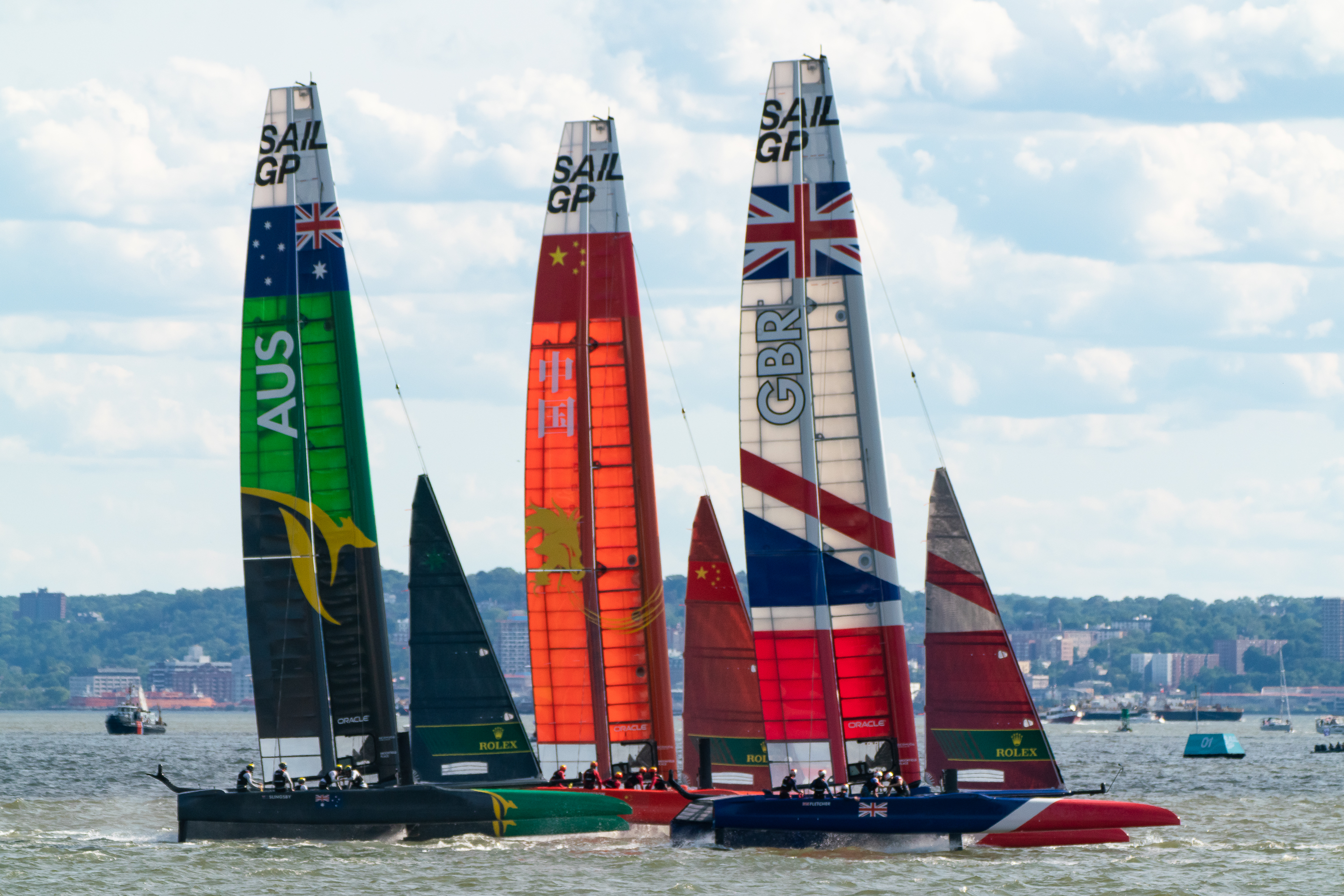
- The Australian, Chinese, and British SailGP teams at the New York SailGP.

Event title
- Name: 2019 SailGP Championship
- Dates: February 15 to September 22, 2019
- Yachts: F50

Results
- Winner: Australia (1st title)

The 2019 SailGP Championship was the first season of the SailGP championship, and was won by the Australian team.

== Entries ==
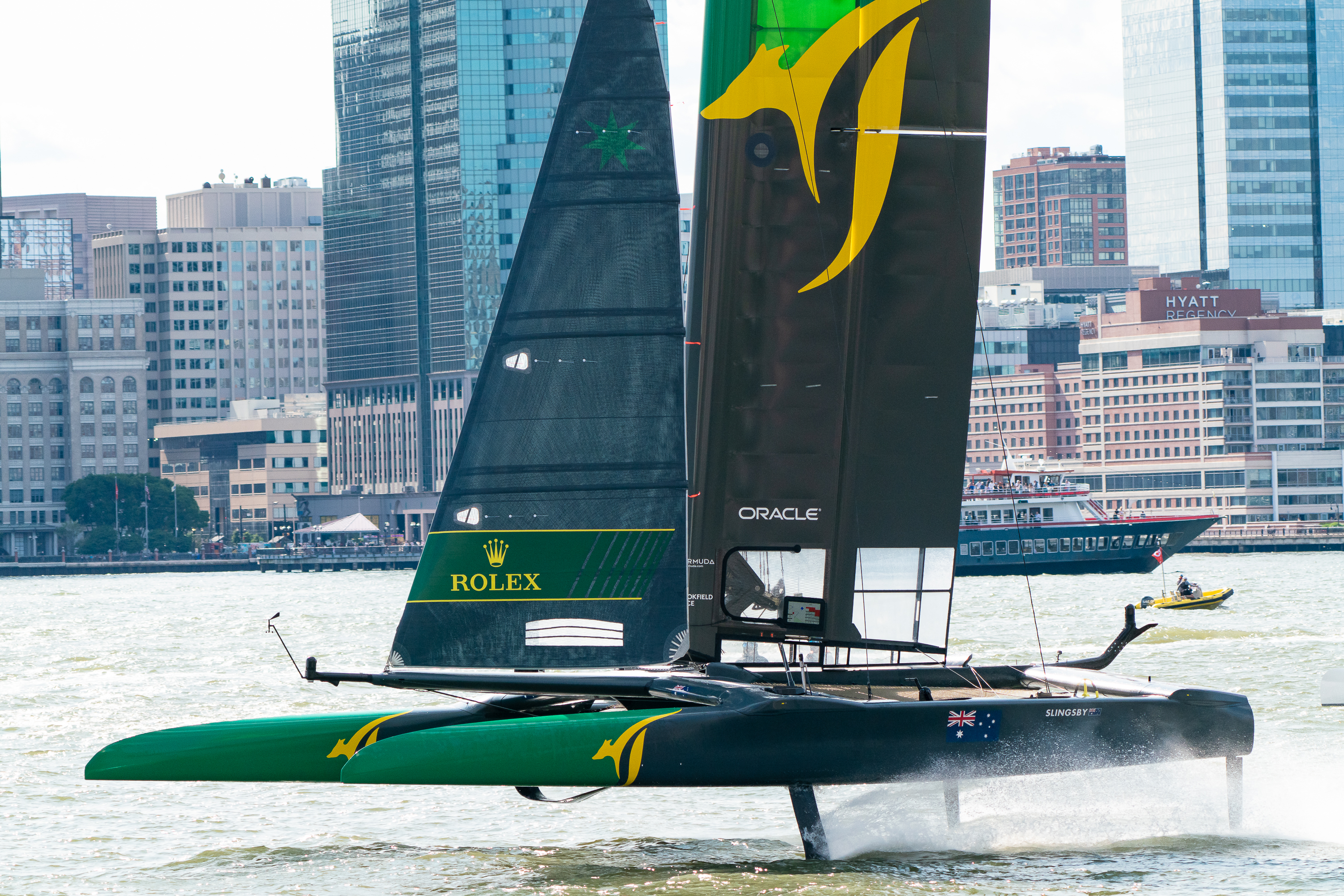
The championship-winning Australian team at the New York SailGP.

The series had six teams enter, all of which competed in all rounds.

Team	Helmsman	Rounds
Australia SailGP Team	(Australia) Tom Slingsby	All
China SailGP Team	(New Zealand) Phil Robertson	All
France SailGP Team	(France) Billy Besson	All
(United Kingdom) Great Britain SailGP Team	(United Kingdom) Dylan Fletcher	All
Japan SailGP Team	(Australia) Nathan Outteridge	All
United States SailGP Team	(United States) Rome Kirby	All
Citation:

== Calendar ==
The season was contested over five rounds, of which all but one were won by the Australian team.

Rnd	Host	Title	Dates	Winning team
TEST	Sydney, Australia	Sydney Sail Grand Prix	February 15–16	Australia
1	(United States) San Francisco, USA	San Francisco Sail Grand Prix	May 4–5	Australia
2	(United States) New York City, USA	New York Sail Grand Prix	June 21–22	Japan
3	(United Kingdom) Cowes, England (Isle of Wight)	Coews Sail Grand Prix	August 10–11	Australia (Note: Although the Cowes SailGP was planned to take place over 5 races and a final, the event was shortened due to extreme weather and was awarded to the Australian team.)
4	Marseille, France	Marseille Sail Grand Prix	September 20–22	Australia
Citation:

== Season ==
=== Round 1: Sydney ===
Pos	Team	1	2	3	4	5	F
1	Australia	4	1	1	1	1	1
2	Japan	1	2	2	2	3	2
3	(United Kingdom) Great Britain	3	4	4	3	5	
4	China	2	6	6	6	2	
5	France	DNF	5	3	4	4	
6	United States	5	3	5	5	6	

=== Round 2: San Francisco ===
Pos	Team	(United States) SFN					
Pos	Team	1	2	3	4	5	F
1	Australia	2	2	3	3	1	1
2	Japan	1	1	1	2	4	2
3	(United Kingdom) Great Britain	3	4	2	1	2	
4	United States	4	3	4	4	3	
5	France	5	6	6	5	5	
6	China	6	5	5	6	6	

=== Round 3: New York ===
Pos	Team	1	2	3	4	5	F
1	Japan	2	1	1	1	2	1
2	Australia	1	2	2	2	3	2
3	United States	4	4	5	4	1	
4	China	3	5	3	5	6	
5	France	5	3	4	6	5	
6	(United Kingdom) Great Britain	6	6	6	3	4	

=== Round 4: Cowes ===
Pos	Team	1	2	3
1	Australia	1	1	1
2	Japan	2	3	3
3	China	3	2	4
4	France	4	5	2
5	United States	6	4	5
6	(United Kingdom) Great Britain	5	6	6

Event shortened due to extreme weather

=== Round 5: Marseille ===
Pos	Team	1	2	3	4	5	6	7
1	Australia	2	1	2	1	2	2	
2	Japan	1	4	1	2	3	1	
3	China	5	3	5	3	1	4	2
4	France	4	5	4	4	6	3	1
5	(United Kingdom) Great Britain	3	2	3	6	4	6	4
6	United States	6	6	6	5	5	5	3

=== Grand Final: Marseille ===
Pos	Team	F
1	Australia	1
2	Japan	2

== Results ==
Points were awarded per race, with 10 points for the winner, 9 points for second place, 8 points for third, and so on.

Each event hosted multiple races, with the two highest scoring teams after each round facing off one-on-one. The winner of that final race won the event. The two highest scoring teams at the end of the season competed in Marseille with the winning team awarded the championship.

Pos	Team	(United States) SFN	(United States) NYC	(United Kingdom) COW	(France) MAR	(France) FIN	Points
1	Australia	1	2	1	1	1	49
2	Japan	2	1	2	2	2	46
3	China	6	4	3	3		28
4	(United Kingdom) Great Britain	3	6	5	5		26
6	France	5	5	6	4		24
4	United States	4	3	5	6		26
Citations:

Key
Colour	Result
1	Winner
2	Second place
3	Third place
4–6	Finish
DNF	Did not finish
DNS	Did not start
DSQ	Disqualified
WH	Withheld from racing
C	Race cancelled
