= 2019–20 America's Cup World Series =

America's Cup World Series
- Sport: Sailing
- Founded: 2011
- No. of teams: 4
- Country: New Zealand; United States; United Kingdom; Italy
- Related competitions: America's Cup

The 2020 America's Cup World Series was held between 17 and 20 December 2020 in the lead up to the 2021 America's Cup.

== Teams ==
Four teams have entered the regatta

Club	Team	Helmsman
(United States)	American Magic	Dean Barker
(United Kingdom)	Ineos Team UK	Ben Ainslie
(New Zealand)	Emirates Team New Zealand	Peter Burling
(Italy)	Luna Rossa Challenge	James Spithill Francesco Bruni

== Standings ==
	Team	W	L
1	Emirates Team New Zealand	5	1
2	(United States) American Magic	4	2
3	(Italy) Luna Rossa Challenge	3	3
4	(United Kingdom) Ineos Team UK	0	6

== Cancelled schedules ==
World Series races in Sardinia and Portsmouth were cancelled due to the impact of the COVID-19 pandemic on sports.

== Auckland schedule ==
A total of 12 races were contested during the double round-robin seeding round. All races were 6 legs (3 upwind and 3 downwind), except for Race 7 which was 8 legs (Excess wind), Race 9 which was 4 legs (Course Shorten mid race), Race 10 which was 5 legs (Light winds) and Race 12 which was 4 legs (Light winds).

	Date	Time	Port Entry	Starboard Entry	Time
Race 1	December 17, 2020 (Course C)	25'24"	Emirates Team New Zealand	(Italy) Luna Rossa Challenge	+3'13" (3,336 m)
Race 2	December 17, 2020 (Course C)	27'03"	(United States) American Magic	(United Kingdom) Ineos Team UK	+5'00" (4,247 m)
Race 3	December 17, 2020 (Course C)	RET (Mainsail)	(United Kingdom) Ineos Team UK	(Italy) Luna Rossa Challenge	27'41"
Race 4	December 17, 2020 (Course C)	26'20"'	(United States) American Magic	Emirates Team New Zealand	+12" (179 m)
Race 5	December 18, 2020 (Course C)	23'42"	(Italy) Luna Rossa Challenge	(United States) American Magic	+15" (225 m)
Race 6	December 18, 2020 (Course C)	21'09"	Emirates Team New Zealand	(United Kingdom) Ineos Team UK	+1'32" (1,250 m)
Race 7	December 18, 2020 (Course C)	28'48"	(United States) American Magic	(Italy) Luna Rossa Challenge	+30" (402 m)
Race 8	December 18, 2020 (Course C)	+1'42" (1,374 m)	(United Kingdom) Ineos Team UK	Emirates Team New Zealand	26'54"
Race 9	December 19, 2020 (Course B)	25'01"	(Italy) Luna Rossa Challenge	(United Kingdom) Ineos Team UK	+3'45" (5,541 m)
Race 10	December 19, 2020 (Course B)	25'42"	Emirates Team New Zealand	(United States) American Magic	+1'19" (1,004 m)
Race 11	December 19, 2020 (Course B)	+5'00" (2,226 m)	(United Kingdom) Ineos Team UK	(United States) American Magic	27'12"
Race 12	December 19, 2020 (Course B)	+16" (141 m)	(Italy) Luna Rossa Challenge	Emirates Team New Zealand	28'38"

== Christmas Race ==
After seeded based on record, followed by a single-elimination knockout round All races were to be run on Course A, but races were abandoned due to light winds, with no winner declared. The race between Emirates Team New Zealand and Ineos Team UK started, and the course was shortened to four legs midway through the race. New Zealand held a commanding lead, expecting to finish before the UK had even completed their first lap but, as NZ did not reach the finish line within the 45-minute time limit, the race was declared over with no winner. Winds did not increase during the day, and so the second semi-final and finals races were abandoned with backup day having been scheduled.

Semifinals
1	Emirates Team New Zealand	DNF
4	(United Kingdom) Ineos Team UK	DNF
2	(United States) American Magic	ABND
3	(Italy) Luna Rossa Challenge

Finals
Race Abandoned
No Winner Declared
Third Place

== See also ==
- 2021 America's Cup
- 2021 Prada Cup
- 2015–16 America's Cup World Series
