= China SailGP Team =

Chinese Sailing Team

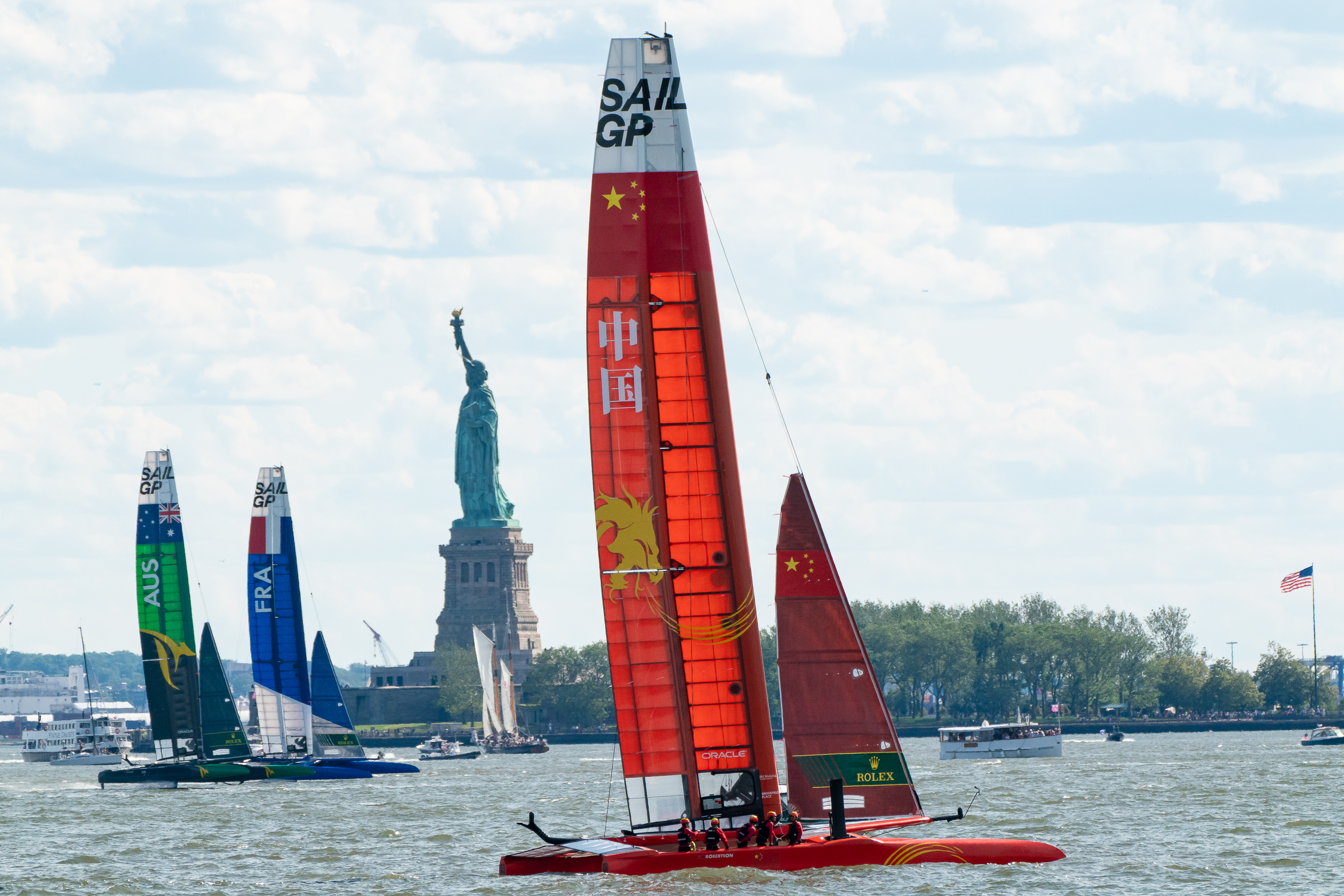
- China SailGP Team in New York

China SailGP Team
- Esablished: 2019
- Folded: 2020
- Driver: (New Zealand) Phil Robertson
- Wing Trimmer: (United Kingdom) Ed Powys
- Flight Controller: (Australia) James Weirzbowski
- Grinder: (China) Lie Xue (China) Jinhao Chen

SailGP Career
- First Entry: 2019 Sydney Sail Grand Prix
- SailGP Championships: 0

China SailGP Team was one of the six teams that competed in the inaugural season of the SailGP Championship in 2019. It finished 3rd in that first season, and announced on the team's Instagram on January 7, 2020, that operation had been suspended. The team was helmed by Phil Robertson.

== History ==
=== 2019 Season ===
The China SailGP Team was one of the six teams that competed in the inaugural season of SailGP in 2019 , and the team was established by F50 League LLC.

== Results ==
Season	Driver	Position
2019	(New Zealand) Phil Robertson	3rd
