= Chris Draper =

British sailor

Personal information
- Born: 20 March 1978 (age 48) Sheffield, Yorkshire

Sailing career
- Sport: Sailing
Medal record
Sailing
Representing Great Britain
Olympic Games
Bronze medal – third place	2004 Athens	49er

Chris Draper (born 20 March 1978) is a British sailor who has won multiple World and European championships and a bronze medal at the Sailing at the 2004 Olympic competing in the mixed 49er. He has been a winner of the Extreme Sailing Series and was helmsman for Luna Rossa, Italy's America's Cup challenger 2011 to 2015. In the 34th Americas cup he became the first Britain to helm in the Louis Vuitton cup final. For the ACWS & 35th America's Cup between 2015 and the Cup event in Bermuda in June 2017 he held the position of Sailing Team Manager / Tactician and Wing trimmer for Softbank Team Japan. In 2019 he became CEO and Wing trimmer for the Great Britain team racing in the newly formed SailGP, racing the F50 hydro foiling catamarans in a global racing circuit. In 2021 he joined the Japanese SailGP team as a Wing Trimmer. winning multiple events during the 2021/2022 SailGP season and finishing runners up overall.

His current home town is Lytchett Matravers, Dorset, UK. He is married, with two children. He started sailing aged 7 in an Optimist and describes his father and Jim Saltonstall (former RYA Youth Program Leader and Coach) as the key to his current career. Other interests outside of sailing include surfing and mountain biking.

== Sailing career ==
=== 1996 ===
- ISAF Youth Sailing World Championships – Laser 2 – Silver Medal
- 1996 – Winner – UK Senior National Championships – 420
- Winner – UK Youth National Championships – 420
- 1995 or 1996 – THE RUTLAND – JOHNNY MERRICKS TIGER TROPHY – 420

=== 2024 ===
Wing Trimmer for the Australian SailGP team

=== 2022 ===
Wing Trimmer for the Canadian SailGP team

=== 2021 ===
Wing Trimmer for the Japan SailGP team. The team won events in the Italian and French legs of the world circuit finishing overall runners up for the season

=== 2019 ===
CEO and Wing Trimmer for the Great Britain SailGP team

=== 2017 ===
Tactician and Wing trimmer on Softbank Team Japan America's Cup catamaran for 35th AC in Bermuda. In semi final for Challenger selection.

=== 2016 ===
ACWS Softbank Team Japan

=== 2015 ===
Helm for Luna Rossa until team withdrew from 35th Americas Cup Joined Softbank Team Japan as Sailing Team Manager, Tactician and Wing Trimmer for ACWS

=== 2014 ===
Helm for Luna Rossa

=== 2013 ===
- America's Cup, on Luna Rossa 72' AC Catamaran. Louis Vuitton Cup finalist, Helmsman
- 2nd Overall Americas Cup World Series 2012 – 2013

=== 2012 ===
He won, on Luna Rossa Piranha, the first ACWS fleet racing event in Naples. 2nd Place ACWS match racing in Venice. Winner ACWS Fleet racing and 3rd place match racing ACWS Newport. Second Place ACWS fleet racing San Francisco.

=== 2011 ===
He was a member of the Team Korea America Cup challenge helming all the events in the AC45 World Series in 2011 before leaving the team. The team were in a highly creditable 4th place at the time.

=== 2010 ===
- 49er World Championships – 6th
- 49er European Championships – 1st Gold Medal
- Princess Sophia Trophy – 2nd Silver medal 49er

=== 2009 ===
- 49er World Championships – 6th
- Extreme Sailing Series (then the iShares Cup) (Helm) – 1st

=== 2008 ===
- Extreme Sailing Series (then the iShares Cup) (Helm) – 4th

=== 2007 ===
- 49er World Championships – 9th
- Semaine Olympique Française – 1st 49er

=== 2006 ===
- 49er World Championships – 1st Gold Medal
- 49er Olympic test event – 1st Gold Medal
- Mumm 30 World Championship – 3rd
- Mumm 30 Spi Ouest – 1st

=== 2004 ===
- Olympic Regatta, Athens – Bronze Medal 49er
- 49er European Championship – 1st Gold Medal
- 49er World Championship – 2nd Silver Medal

=== 2003 ===
- ISAF Sailing World Championships – 1st Gold Medal 49er
- 49er European Championship – 2nd Silver Medal
- Kiel Week Regatta, Germany – 1st Gold Medal 49er
- SPA Olympic Class Regatta, Holland – 1st Gold Medal 49er
- Olympic Class Week, Barcelona – 1st Gold Medal 49er
- Cádiz Test Event – 2nd Silver Medal 49er

=== 2002 ===
- Olympic Test Event 2002 – 3rd Bronze Medal 49er
- 49er European Championship – 2nd Silver Medal
- 49er World Championship – 2nd Silver Medal
- 2000 – Winner – UK Olympic Sailing Trials – 470
