= Kyle Langford (sailor) =

Australian sailor (born 1989)

Kyle Langford (born 30 July 1989) is an Australian sailor who has competed in multiple America's Cups

Langford is a member of Oracle Racing and in 2010 won the RC44 World Championships in a crew skippered by Jimmy Spithill. He was a late addition to the sailing crew for the 2013 America's Cup. Langford was appointed as the wing trimmer following the suspension of Dirk de Ridder.

He again sailed with Oracle during the 2015–16 America's Cup World Series and the 2017 America's Cup.

Langford sailed in the 2011 Extreme Sailing Series with The Wave, Muscat and the 2014 Extreme Sailing Series with Oman Sail.

Langford sailed on Team Brunel in the 2017–18 Volvo Ocean Race.

Langford served as wing trimmer for the Australia SailGP Team, joining Tom Slingsby's crew ahead of the inaugural season in 2019. The team dominated the new league, winning the first three seasons of SailGP. Langford joined the Italy SailGP Team prior to the 2025 season.
