= Anonimo =

Italian watch company

Anonimo Watches SA
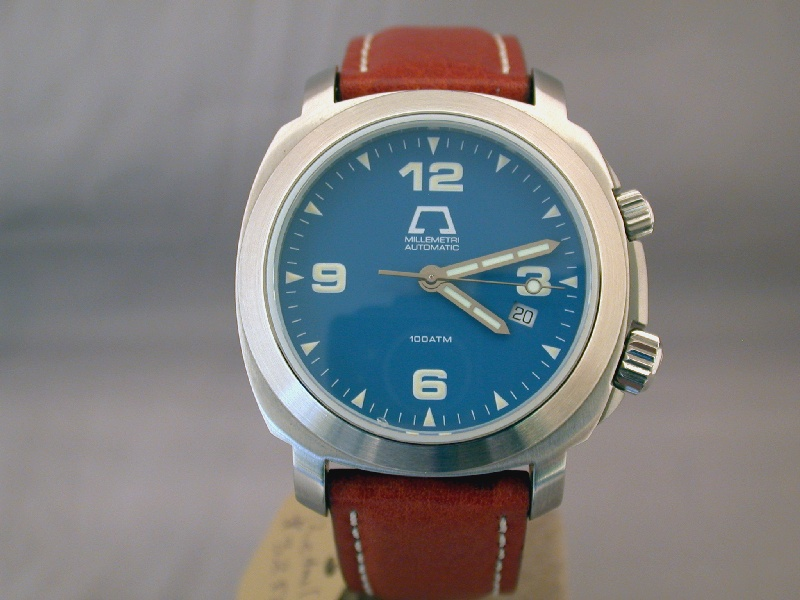
- Company type: Private
- Industry: Watchmaking
- Founded: 1997
- Founder: Federico Massacesi
- Headquarters: Florence, Tuscany, Italy
- Products: Watches
- Website: anonimo.com

Anonimo Watches SA is a watchmaking company. Its watches are manufactured in Florence, Italy, with Swiss movements provided by ETA SA or Sellita.

The company was founded in 1997 in Florence, Italy, by Federico Massacesi and makes only mechanical watches with prices ranging from $2,500 to over $10,000.

When watchmaker Panerai relocated from Florence to Neuchatel, Switzerland, many Panerai watchmakers were taken on by Anonimo.

In 2013, Anonimo Firenze was bought out by a private group of European investors and became Anonimo SA, moving its head office to Switzerland, but still remaining an independent watch brand.

== Models ==
Current models use self-winding movements by Sellita, an independent Swiss producer founded in 1950.

- 1997 Millemetri: 120 ATM diving watch.
- 2001 Militare
- 2002 Match racing: a sailing chronograph.
- 2003 Professionale: diving watch tested to 200 ATM.
- 2003 Anonimo Dino Zei
- 2003 Cronoscopio
- 2003 Militare Crono
- 2005 Polluce
- 2005 Nautilo
- 2007 Dino Zei San Marco
- 2018 Epurato
