= 2014 Extreme Sailing Series =

2014 international sailing events

Event title
- Edition: 8th
- Dates: 20 February–14 December 2014
- Yachts: Extreme 40

Results
- Winner: (Switzerland) Alinghi

The 2014 Extreme Sailing Series was the eighth edition of the sailing series, and the fourth year as a fully global event. The series started in Singapore on 20 February 2014 and ended in Sydney, Australia on 14 December 2014. It took place in eight cities across three continents.

== Acts ==
Ports visited

=== Act 1: Singapore ===
For the first time, the first act of the 2014 series was held in Singapore between 20 and 23 February 2014.

=== Act 2: Muscat, Oman ===
The second act of the series was held in Muscat, Oman, usually the first act, on the weekend of 19–22 March 2014.

=== Act 3: Qingdao, China ===
Qingdao, China was the host of the third act of the 2014 series, on the weekend of 1–4 May 2014.

=== Act 4: Saint Petersburg, Russia ===
The fourth act was held in Saint Petersburg, Russia, a new venue in the Extreme Sailing Series. It was held on the weekend of 26–29 June 2014.

=== Act 5: Cardiff, UK ===
The fifth act of 2014 was held in Cardiff, Wales for the third time, and was held on the bank holiday weekend of 22–25 August 2014.

=== Act 6: Istanbul, Turkey ===
The fourth act took place in Istanbul, Turkey on the weekend of 11–14 September 2014.

=== Act 7: Nice, France ===
The seventh act took place in Nice, France between 2–5 October 2014.

=== Act 8: Sydney, Australia ===
Act 8 was held in a new continent, and at a new venue for the series. On the weekend of 11–14 December 2014, the act saw itself in Sydney, Australia.

== Teams ==
=== Core teams ===
==== Alinghi ====
A regular in the series, Alinghi returned again after taking second place in the 2013 series.

The crew list remained unchanged from 2013, consisting of Ernesto Bertarelli (Skipper/Helm), Morgan Larson (Tactician/Helm), Stuart Pollard/Anna Tunnicliffe (Tactician), Pierre-Yves Jorand (Mainsail Trim), Nils Frei (Headsail Trim) and Yves Detry (Bowman).

==== Emirates Team New Zealand ====
Emirates Team New Zealand is a new team to the series, while taking a break from the America's Cup.

The crew list was Dean Barker/Peter Burling (Skipper/Helm), Blair Tuke/Glenn Ashby/Ray Davies (Mainsail Trim), James Dagg (Headsail Trim), Jeremy Lomas (Bowman) and Edwin Delaat as a floater.

==== GAC Pindar ====
GAC Pindar, in its fourth year sailing Extreme 40's, is a long-time sailing team competing in the World Match Racing Tour and supporting numerous sailors across all levels of the sport.

The 2014 crew list was Seve Jarvin (Skipper), Nathan Wilmot (Skipper/Helm), David Gilmour (Skipper/Bowman), Jack Macartney/Ed Smyth (Tactician), Alexandra South (Tactician/Bow), Troy Tindill (Mainsail Trim), Hugh Styles (Headsail Trim) and Sam Newton/James Wierzbowski/Tyson Lamond (Bowman).

==== Gazprom Team Russia ====
The team included Igor Lisovenko, Phil Robertson, Matt Adams, Pete Cumming and Aleksey Kulakov.

==== Groupama Sailing Team ====
The team included Tanguy Cariou, François Morvan, Romain Motteau, Thierry Fouchier and Devan Le Bihan.

==== J.P. Morgan BAR ====
J.P. Morgan BAR was a one time entry into the Extreme Sailing Series with Ben Ainslie at the helm.

The full crew list was: Ben Ainslie (Skipper/Helm), Nick Hutton/Bleddyn Mon (Tactician), Paul Goodison/Paul Campbell-James (Mainsail Trim), Pippa Wilson/Phil Sparks (Headsail Trim) and Matt Cornwell (Bowman).

==== Oman Air ====
Oman Air, sponsored by the national airline Oman Air, returned in 2014 after a year out.

Their team consisted of Rob Greenhalgh (Skipper/Helm), Tom Johnson/Kyle Langford (Mainsail Trim), Ted Hackney (Headsail Trim) and Hashim Al Rashdi/Musab Al Hadi (Bowman).

==== Realteam ====
The team included Jérôme Clerc, Arnaud Psarofaghis, Bruno Barbarin, Cédric Schmidt and Thierry Wassem.

==== Red Bull Sailing Team ====
The team included Roman Hagara, Hans-Peter Steinacher, Mark Bulkeley, Shaun Mason and Stewart Dodson.

==== SAP Extreme Sailing Team ====
The team included Jes Gram-Hansen, Rasmus Køstner, Thierry Douillard, Christian Kamp and Brad Farrand.

==== The Wave, Muscat ====
The team included Leigh McMillan, Sarah Ayton, Pete Greenhalgh, Kinley Fowler and Nasser Al Mashari.

==== TeamTurx ====
The team included Mitch Booth, Edhem Dirvana, Selim Kakış, Ateş Çınar and Anıl Berk Baki.

== Results ==
Rank	Team	Act 1	Act 2	Act 3	Act 4	Act 5	Act 6	Act 7	Act 8	Overall points
1	(Switzerland) Alinghi	10	8	10	10	9	8	10	20	85
2	(Oman) The Wave, Muscat	9	10	7	9	10	9	3	18	75
3	(Switzerland) Realteam	8	5	9	6	6	2	9	16	61
4	Emirates Team New Zealand	7	9	8	8	1	10	6	DNS	49
5	(United Kingdom) J. P. Morgan BAR	4	2	4	7	8	4	8	12	49
6	(Austria) Red Bull Sailing Team	5	4	2	2	7	3	7	10	40
7	Oman Air	2	1	5	3	5	7	1	14	38
8	(Denmark) SAP Extreme Sailing Team	1	7	1	5	4	6	4	8	36
9	Gazprom Team Russia	3	6	6	4	3	1	1	6	30
10	(France) Groupama Sailing Team	6	3	3	1	2	5	2	4	26
11	(Australia) GAC Pindar	1	1	1	1	1	1	5	2	13
	Invitational Team	1 (Note: Team Aberdeen Singapore)		1 (Note: Team Extreme Qingdao)	1 (Note: RussianFirst)					

DNS = Did not start

Invitational teams
