= Andy Maloney =

New Zealand sailor (born 1990)

Personal information
- Full name: Andrew Maloney
- Nationality: New Zealand
- Born: 2 June 1990 (age 36)

Sailing career
- Sport: Sailing
- Class: Finn
Medal record
Sailing
Representing New Zealand
World Championships
Gold medal – first place	2021 Porto, POR	Finn
Gold medal – first place	2008 Auckland, NZL	Laser Radial
Bronze medal – third place	2012 Newport, USA	Melges 32
Bronze medal – third place	2008 Boltenhagen, GER	Laser
Bronze medal – third place	2006 Garda, ITA	Splash
Bronze medal – third place	2005 Puck, POL	Splash

Andrew Maloney (born 2 June 1990) is a New Zealand professional sailor born on 2 June 1990.

== Sailing career ==
From the Murrays Bay Sailing Club, he finished third in both the 2005 and 2006 World Championships in the Splash class.

He finished 13th in the 2011 ISAF Sailing World Championships in a Laser, he then finished third at the 2012 Laser World Championships. He also sailed for Oman Sail in the 2012 Extreme Sailing Series. At the 2013 America's Cup, Maloney was part of the New Zealand team that won the Youth America's Cup, sailing alongside Peter Burling, Blair Tuke and Guy Endean.

He attempted to qualify for the 2016 Summer Olympics in the Laser class, but missed out on a spot in the New Zealand Olympic team to eventual bronze medallist, Sam Meech. His sister, Alex Maloney, is a professional sailor who won Silver at the 2016 Summer Olympics in a 49erFX with Sam Meech's sister, Molly.

Maloney joined Team New Zealand in November 2016. He added 10 kilograms (22 pounds) in muscle to bulk up for a grinding role on the boat. The role turned out to be as a "cyclor", after Team New Zealand decided to install pedal powered grinders. Maloney was part of the crew that won the 2017 America's Cup.
