= Phil Robertson (sailor) =

New Zealand sailor (born 1987)

Personal information
- Nationality: New Zealand
- Born: 22 October 1987 (age 38) Auckland, New Zealand

Sport
- Sport: Sailing
- Event(s): F50, M32, Moth, J/80, IOD
Medal record
Sailing
World Championships
Bronze medal – third place	2012 ISAF Match Racing	J/80
Bronze medal – third place	2013 ISAF Match Racing	J/80
Gold medal – first place	2016 World Match Racing Tour	M32
Gold medal – first place	2017 M32 World	M32
Gold medal – first place	2018 M32 World	M32
Gold medal – first place	2019 World Match Racing Tour	M32
SailGP Championships
Bronze medal – third place	2019 SailGP championship	F50
- Updated on 2024-07-18

Phil Robertson (born 1987) is a New Zealand sailor. He is the current driver of Red Bull Italy SailGP Team having previously driven for Canada SailGP Team in seasons 3 and 4 of SailGP after successful seasons as driver of developing teams China SailGP Team in 2019 and Spain SailGP Team in 2021.

Phil was born and raised in Auckland, New Zealand and sailed with his family from a very young age. He started competitive racing at the age of 10 and currently resides in Sweden.

== Career highlights ==
2012 – Achieved Bronze in the ISAF Match Racing World Championship.

2013 – Achieved Bronze in the ISAF Match Racing World Championship.

2016 – won World Championship World Match Racing Tour as part of team Phil Robertson Racing.

2017 – won World Championship M32 World representing New Zealand.

2018 – won World Championship M32 World representing China.

2019 – won World Championship World Match Racing Tour as part of team ChinaOne Ningbo.

2019 – Achieved Bronze in the 2019 SailGP championship leading China SailGP Team.
