= Royal Cornwall Yacht Club =

Coordinates: 51.5023°N 0.1591°W

- Burgee

- Ensign
- Short name: RCYC
- Founded: 1871
- Location: Falmouth
- Website: http://www.royalcornwallyachtclub.org

Situated on the waterfront setting of the Greenbank area in Falmouth, the Royal Cornwall Yacht Club (RCYC) was formed in 1871, and is the 15th oldest “Royal” yacht club in England.

== History ==
In 1871 the forty-seven founding members of the club first elected Lord Wodehouse (the future second Earl of Kimberley) as Commodore. In June, 1872 sanction was given by the Admiralty for members of the club to wear the defaced Blue Ensign and the Home Office gave permission for the word "Royal" to be incorporated in the club's title.

The first Patrons were Queen Victoria and the future King Edward VII (then Duke of Cornwall) and successive Monarchs were Patrons until King George VI was succeeded by Prince Philip Duke of Edinburgh in 1952. Prince Charles (Duke of Cornwall) has been the Patron since 1977.

Falmouth has long been a venue for major regattas. "The King's Class", for Kings Edward VII and George V were frequent competitors in Britannia, and later the J-Class were regular features of RCYC Regattas prior to the World Wars. Since the Second World War the club has organised national and international sailing events including, in 2012, the Finn Gold Cup.

In January 2012 the RCYC officially became the club under which the newly formed Ben Ainslie Racing would compete in the America's Cup World Series. In July 2012 the Club hosted a regatta for the J-Class; it had not sailed in Falmouth since 1936, or as a fleet in UK waters since 1937.
