= Nils Frei =

Swiss sailor (born 1973)

Nils Frei (born 19 January 1973) is a Swiss sailor who has sailed for Alinghi in the America's Cup and Extreme Sailing Series.

A six-time Swiss champion in the dinghy class, Frei finished third in the 1995 world championships in the H-boat class. He was sailing with Kurt Frei and Peter Rüfli. He attempted to qualify for the Olympics in a 49er before attending the University of Geneva, where he studied geography. He then worked for the Berne Economic Development Agency.

Frei first sailed for Alinghi in 2001. He was involved in their 2003 Louis Vuitton Cup and 2003 America's Cup victories. Alinghi then successfully defended the 2007 America's Cup.

Frei was the downward trimmer on Alinghi 5 when it lost the 2010 America's Cup.

Since then, Frei has sailed with Alinghi in the Extreme Sailing Series. They won the series in 2014 and 2016.
