= GC32 =

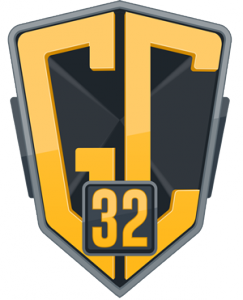
- Class symbol

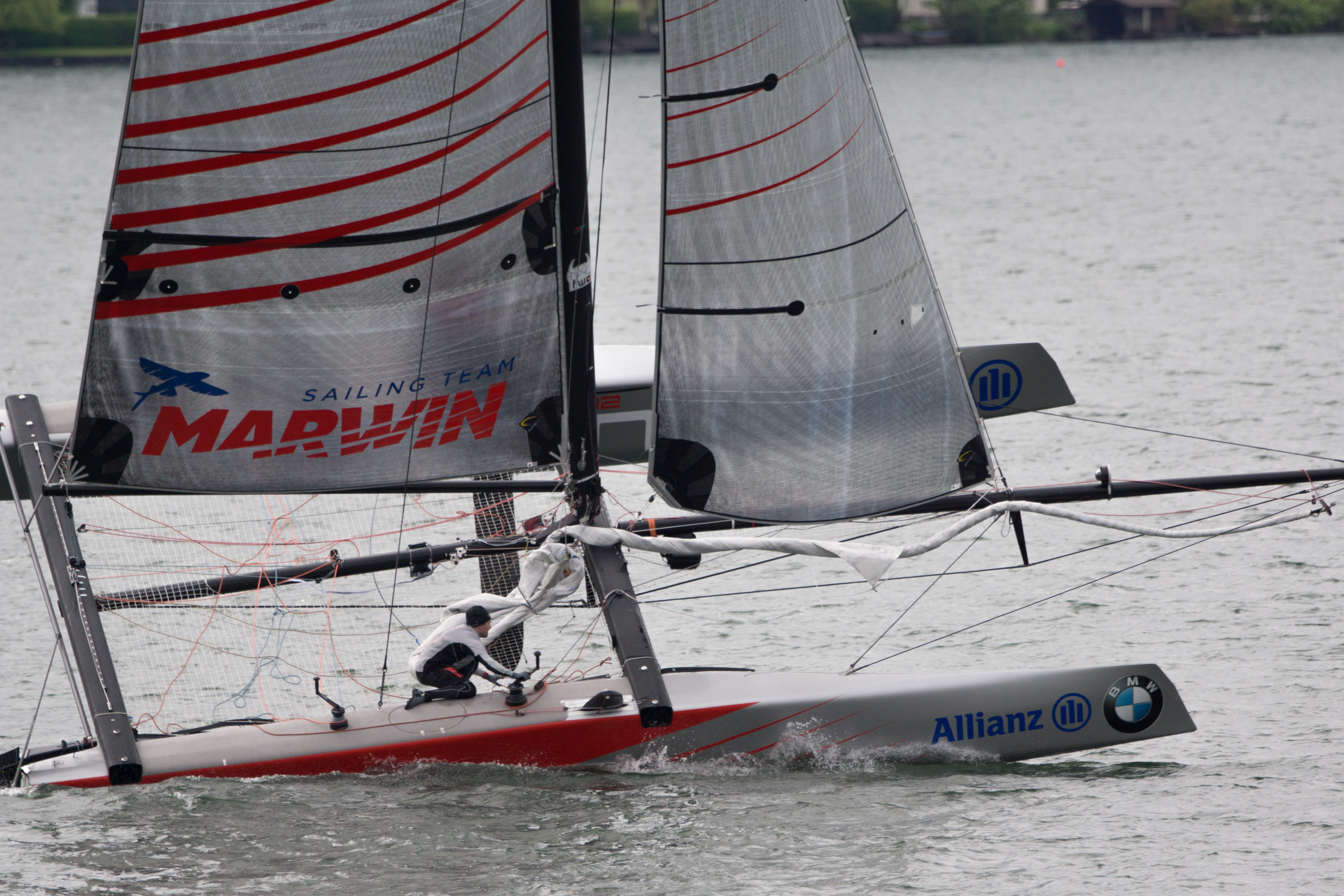

Boat
- Draft: 2.1 m (6.9 ft) (upwind); 1.6 m (5.2 ft) (downwind)

Hull
- Hull weight: 950 kg (2,090 lb)
- LOA: 12 m (39 ft)
- LOH: 10 m (33 ft)
- Beam: 6 m (20 ft)

Rig
- Mast height: 16.5 m (54 ft)

Sails
- Mainsail area: 60 m^{2} (650 sq ft)
- Jib/genoa area: 23.5 m^{2} (253 sq ft)
- Gennaker area: 90 m^{2} (970 sq ft)

The GC32 is a class of hydrofoiling catamaran, 32 feet in length (9.75 meters) and constructed of carbon fibre, with a top speed of about 40 knots (74 km/h; 46 mph). They are sailed in the GC32 Racing Tour, and have replaced the Extreme 40's in the Extreme Sailing Series.

== History ==
Conceived by Laurent Lenne, who was trained as a naval architect in Southampton, the GC32 was designed by Dr. Martin Fischer. Built from carbon fibre, the boat is manufactured in Dubai by Premier Composite Technologies and then marketed by Lenne's company, THE GREAT CUP BV.

In 2013, the first version of the GC32 was built. In 2014, the second version of the Flying GC32 was ready by April 2014 and create the GC32Racing Tour in 2014. Laurent is nowadays mainly responsible for expanding the GC32 racing experience and helping new owners to join the GC32 community.

== Design ==
For the first season the boats competed with their Mk1 foil package comprising a ‘double S’ configuration main foil/daggerboard and L-profile rudder. These were designed to reduce displacement, but not cause the GC32 to fly.

By spring of 2014, the GC32 was refitted with an Mk2 foil package. The change came as a result of inspiration drawn from the AC72 catamarans seen in the 34th America's Cup. This transformed the class into fully flying foiling catamarans.

Although the GC32 shares some similarities with the America's Cup catamarans, there are some stark differences. The foils are substantially larger (compared to the boat's size) than those used in America's Cup versions. The effect is that the GC32 is more controllable and easier to steer. Furthermore, the GC32 is able to foil in low wind speeds with greater stability and ease. Despite having the larger foils, these boats are fast and can reach speeds of 40 knots (74 km/h; 46 mph). Also different from the America's Cup design is the more manageable soft-sail rig (with one design sails and no hydraulics), rather than a rigid carbon fibre wing. The foil package and boat set up enables it to be sailed by more than just elite athletes; amateur sailors and owners can also experience the very latest technology in high performance yacht racing.

== GC32 International Class Association ==
As of 2017, the GC32 catamaran is recognized by World Sailing as an international sailboat class. This enables the class to hold a world championship event. The first world championship will take place on Lake Garda in May 2018.

== Racing Circuits ==
=== Extreme Sailing Series ===
The GC32 was introduced onto the Extreme Sailing Series circuit for the 2016 season, thus replacing the Extreme 40, which had been used since the series' start as the iShares Cup in 2007. The GC served as the Extremes' class until its unfortunate end following the 2018 season.

== Events ==
=== 2018 ===
GC32 World Championship, May 23–27, 2018 (Lake Garda)
