= TP52 World Championship =

World Championship in the TP52 Class

The TP52 World Championship is an annual international sailing regatta for TP 52. It is organized by the host club on behalf of the International Class Association and recognized by World Sailing, the sports IOC recognized governing body.

== Events ==
Event			Host			Boats	Sailors					Ref.
Ed.	Dates	Year	Host club	Location	Country	Boats	Ath.			Nat.	Cont.	Ref.
N/A	7 - 12 Mar	2006	Part of Miami Race Week	Miami, Florida	United States	9	Unofficial "Globals"					
N/A	Sep	2007	Yacht Club Costa Smeralda	Porto Cervo	Italy	15	Unofficial "Globals"					
1	-	2008	Club de Mar Puerto Calero	Lanzarote	Spain	14				18+	5+	
2	-	2009	Real Club Náutico de Palma	Palma, Mallorca	Spain	10				16+	5+	
3	5 - 9 Oct	2010	Real Club Náutico de Valencia	Valencia	Spain	9				19+	5+	
4	-	2011	Yacht Club Costa Smeralda	Porto Cervo	Italy	7						
	-	2012	NOT HELD									
5	5 - 8 Mar	2013		Miami, Florida	United States	8				14+	5+	
6	10 - 14 June	2014	Yacht Club Costa Smeralda	Porto Cervo	Italy	9				13+	4+	
7	14 - 18 July	2015		Portals Nous, Mallorca	Spain	12				4+	3+	
8	14 - 18 Sept	2016	Club Marítimo de Mahón	Mahón, Menorca	Spain	12				6+	3+	
9	16 - 20 May	2017	Yacht Club Isole di Toscana	Scarlino	Italy	10				12+	4+	
10	17 - 21 July	2018	Clube Naval de Cascais	Cascais	Portugal	9				11+	5+	
11	25 - 29 Aug	2019		Portals Nous, Mallorca	Spain	11	149	145	4	19	6	
N/A	31 Mar to 5 Apr	2020	Royal Cape Yacht Club	Cape Town	South Africa	CANCELLED DUE TO COVID						
N/A	14 - 19 Sept	2020		Portals Nous, Mallorca	Spain	CANCELLED DUE TO COVID						
12	2 - 6 Nov	2021	Real Club Náutico de Palma	Palma, Mallorca	Spain	10				7+	4+	
13	20 - 25 June	2022	Clube Naval de Cascais	Cascais	Portugal	9				9+	4+	
14	21 - 25 Aug	2023	Real Club Náutico de Barcelona	Barcelona	Spain	10	140	134	6	20	6	
15	15 - 20 July	2024	New York Yacht Club, Newport	Newport, Rhode Island	United States	10	146	133	8	22	6	
16	1 - 6 July	2025	Clube Naval de Cascais	Cascais	Portugal	11	152	147	5	22	6	
17	15-20 June	2026	Yacht Club Costa Smeralda	Porto Cervo	Italy	15	200		3+	25	6	

== Multiple World Champions ==
Compiled from the data below the table includes up to and including 2026 which is incomplete.

Ranking	Sailor	Gold	Silver	Bronze	Total	No. Entries"(1)	Ref.
1	Greg Gendell (USA)	7	1	1	9	14	
2	Terry Hutchinson (USA)	7	1	0	8	9	
2	Sean Clarkson (NZL)	7	1	0	8	12	
4	Matt Cassidy (USA)	6	0	1	7	10	
5	Tom Burnham (USA)	4	1	1	6	8	
5	Brett Jones (AUS)	4	1	1	6	6	
7	Jordi Calafat (ESP)	4	0	2	6	8	
8	Warwick Fleury (NZL)	4	0	1	5	9	
9	Piet Van Nieuwenhuijzen (NED)	4	0	0	4	8	
9	James Dagg (NZL)	4	0	0	4	8	
11	Guillermo Parada (ARG)	3	3	1	7	14	
12	Harm Müller-Spreer (GER)	3	2	3	8	10	
13	Victor Mariño (ESP)	3	2	2	7	10	
14	James "Skip" Baxter (NZL)	3	2	0	5	9	
15	Michael Mueller (GER)	3	1	2	6	10	
16	Doug Devos (USA)	3	1	1	5	8	
16	Adrian Stead (GBR)	3	1	1	5	9	
16	Jeremy Lomas (NZL)	3	1	1	5	8	
16	Ross Halcrow (NZL)	3	1	1	5	10	
16	Ed Baird (USA)	3	1	1	5	9	
22	Gerd Habermüller (AUT)	3	1	0	4	4	
23	Dirk De Ridder (NED)	3	0	2	5	7	
23	Javier De La Plaza (ESP)	3	0	2	5	6	
25	Jules Salter (GBR)	3	0	1	4	7	
26	Rodney Ardern (NZL)	3	0	0	3	5	
26	Lara Poljsak (SLO)	3	0	0	3	5	

1) Full crew list were not published for every year so this may be under estimation

== Medalists ==
Event	Gold	Silver	Bronze	Ref.
2008	USA 52011 - Quantum Racing; Designer - Botin Carkeek (2008); Builder - Longitud Cero Terry Hutchinson (USA); Chris Kam (USA); Doug DeVos (USA); Ed Reynolds (USA); Gerardo Siciliano (ITA); Greg Gendell (USA); Jeremy Lomas (NZL); Jim Cannon (USA); Mark Koetje (USA); Mike Danks (NZL); Morgan Larson (USA); Morgan Trubovich (USA); Sean Clarkson (NZL); James "Skip" Baxter (USA); Steve Howe (USA); Andrew Scott (USA); Tom Burnham (USA)	CHI 2110 - Mutua Madrileña; Designer - Botin & Carkeek (2007); Builder - Longitud 0 Vasco Vascotto (ITA); Bernardo Matte (CHI); Antonio Orlandi (CHI); UNKNOWN	GER 52 - Platoon; Designer - Judel Vrolijk (2006); Builder - Goetz Jochen Schümann (GER); Harm Mueller Spreer (GER); Emanuele Marino (ITA); Jan Schoepe (GER); Jean-Marie Dauris (FRA); Luke Molloy (AUS); Magnus Augustson (SWE); Marc Lagesse (RSA); Matti Paschen (GER); Mikkel Rossberg (DEN); Rod Dawson (NZL); Tim Kröger (GER); Toni Kolb (GER); Zachary Hurst (NZL)	
2009	Matador (2); Designer - Judel Vrolijk (2009); Builder - King Marine, Argentina Alberto Roemmers (ARG); Johan Barne (SWE); Matias Blanco (ARG); Francesco Bruni (ITA); Mariano Caputo (ARG); Justin Clougher (ARG); Alejandro Colla (ARG); Simon Fry (GBR); Jon Gundersen (AUS); Timothy Hardy (GBR); Gabriel Marino (ARG); Guillermo Parada (ARG); Mariano Parada (ARG); Paul Westlake (NZL)	Quantum Racing (2); Designer - Botin Carkeek (2008); Builder - Longitud Cero Terry Hutchinson (USA); Tom Burnham (USA); Jim Cannon (USA); Sean Clarkson (NZL); Greg Gendell (USA); James "Skip" Baxter (NZL); Phil Jameson (NZL); Brett Jones (AUS); Chris Kam (USA); Morgan Larson (USA); Mark Mendelblatt (USA); Ian Moore (GBR); Andrew Scott (USA); Morgan Trubovich (NZL)	Artemis Racing (2); Designer - Reichel Pugh (2008); Builder - Cookson Torbjorn Tornqvist (SWE); Marco Constant (RSA); Andy Fethers (NZL); Daniel Fong (NZL); Jared Henderson (NZL); Chris Hosking (AUS); Michele Ivaldi (ITA); Cam Marshall (NZL); Craig Monk (NZL); Robbie Naismith (NZL); Chris Nicholson (AUS); Paul Cayard (USA); Hamish Pepper (NZL); David Rolfe (NZL); Ian Baker (NZL)	
2010	Quantum Racing (2); Designer - Botin Carkeek (2008); Builder - Longitud Cero Terry Hutchinson (USA); Adrian Stead (GBR); Andrew Scott (USA); Brett Jones (AUS); Chris Kam (USA); Greg Gendell (USA); Kevin Hall (USA); Morgan Trubovich (NZL); Phil Jameson (NZL); Sean Clarkson (NZL); James "Skip" Baxter (NZL); Tom Burnham (USA)	Matador (2); Designer - Judel Vrolijk (2009); Builder - King Marine, Argentina Guillermo Parada (ARG); Alberto Roemmers (ARG); Bruno Zirilli (ITA); Vasco Vascotto (ITA); Francesco Bruni (ITA); Alejandro Colla (ARG); Simon Fry (GBR); Maciel Cicchetti (ARG); Mariano Parada (ARG); Paul Westlake (AUS); Juan Pablo Cadario (ARG); Pedro Rossi (ARG); Elio Mariano Caputo (ARG)	Synergy; Designer - Reichel Pugh (2008); Builder - Oracle Racing Eugeniy Neugodnikov (RUS); Alexander Ekimov (RUS); Chris Main (NZL); Francesco Mongelli (ITA); Igor Matvienko (UKR); Nikolay Kornev (RUS); Pavel Melnikov (RUS); Pavel Mshenski (BLR); Rod Dawson (NZL); Taras Trofimenko (RUS); Valery Ushkov (RUS); Valery Zatsarinskiy (RUS)	
2011	Quantum Racing (3); Designer - Botin Partners (2011); Builder - Longitud Cero Ed Baird (USA); Brett Jones (AUS); Joe Spooner (NZL); James "Skip" Baxter (NZL); Grant Loretz (NZL); Tom Burnham (NZL); Adrian Stead (GBR); Greg Gendell (USA); Matt Cassidy (USA); Francesco Mongelli (ITA); Ben Durham (AUS); Andrew Scott (USA)	Container; Designer - Judel Vrolijk (2011); Builder - Green Marine Markus Wieser (GER); Kazuhiko Sofuku (JPN); Tom Swift (GBR); Alan Smith (NZL); Andrew Taylor (NZL); Yann Gouniot (FRA); Matti Paschen (GER); Don Cowie (NZL); Dirk Neumann (GER); Hamish Pepper (NZL); Marc Lagesse (RSA); Victor Marino (ESP)	Gladiator; Designer - Judel Vrolijk (2009); Builder - Cookson Tony Langley (GBR); Chris Larson (USA); Jeoff Povey (GBR); Simon Dobson (GBR); Tom Wilson (GBR); Jim Turner (GBR); Guy Reid (GBR); Frederick Shanks (GBR); Pablo - (ESP); Lou Varney (GBR); Nacho Postigo (ESP); Mikkel Rossberg (DEN)	
2013	SWE - Rán Racing 4 Designer - Judel Vrolijk (2011); Builder - Green Marine Niklas Zennström (SWE); Tim Powell (GBR); Jules Salter (GBR); Adrian Stead (GBR); Jon Gundersen (NZL); Andy Hemmings (GBR); Jon Taylor (GBR); William Beavis (GBR); Matteo Auguadro (ITA); Alan Smith (NZL); Andrew Taylor (NZL); Mo Gray (GBR)	ITA - Azzurra (2); Designer - Botin Partners (2012); Builder - King Marine Guillermo Parada (ARG); Vasco Vascotto (ITA); Tomislav Basic (CRO); Bruno Zirilli (ITA); David Vera (ESP); Elio Mariano Caputo (ARG); Maciel Cicchetti (ARG); Alejandro Colla (ARG); Gabriel Marino (ARG); Nicola Pilastro (ITA); Simon Fry (GBR); Mariano Parada (ARG); Juan Pablo Marcos (ARG); Paul Westlake (AUS)	USA - Quantum Racing (3); Designer - Botin Partners (2011); Builder - Longitud Cero Ed Baird (USA); Doug Devos (USA); Tom Burnham (USA); Warwick Fleury (NZL); Greg Gendell (USA); Andy Horton (USA); Brett Jones (AUS); Lorenzo Mazza (ITA); Andrew Scott (USA); Joe Spooner (NZL); Juan Vila (ESP); Matt Cassidy (USA); Chris Welch (USA)	
2014	USA - Quantum Racing (3); Designer - Botin Partners (2011); Builder - Longitud Cero Ed Baird (USA); Terry Hutchinson (USA); Tom Burnham (USA); Jordi Calafat (ESP); Juan Vila (ESP); Warwick Fleury (NZL); Lorenzo Mazza (ITA); Greg Gendell (USA); Matt Cassidy (USA); Romolo Ranieri (ITA); Piet Van Nieuwenhuijzen (NED); Sean Clarkson (NZL); Brett Jones (AUS); Jeremy Smith (NZL)	BRA - Phoenix 11; Botin Partners (2014); King Marine Eduardo De Souza Ramos (BRA); Santiago Lange (ARG)	SWE - Rán 4 Judel Vrolijk (2011); Green Marine Niklas Zennström (SWE); Adrian Stead (GBR); Steve Hayles (GBR); Jon Gundersen (NZL); Andy Hemmings (GBR); Matteo Auguadro (ITA); Alan Smith (NZL); Mo Gray (GBR); Scott Crawford (NZL); Tim Powell (GBR); James Gordon (25x17px); Jonathan Taylor (GBR); Jeremy Robinson (GBR); William Beavis (GBR); Jan Klingmueller (GER)	
2015	Azzurra (3); Designer - Botin Partners (2015); Builder - King Marine, Valencia Pablo Roemmers (ARG); Alberto Roemmers Jr (ARG); Guillermo Parada (ITA); Vasco Vascotto (ITA); Bruno Zirilli (ITA); Maciel Cicchetti (ARG); Mariano Parada (NZL); Grant Loretz (ARG); Mariano Caputo (ARG); Juan Pablo Marcos (ARG); David Vera (ESP); Alijandro Colla (ARG); Gabriel Marino (ARG); Nicola Pilastro (ITA); Giovanni Cassinari (ITA); Timothy Houghton	Platoon (3); Harm Müller-Spreer (GER)	Provezza (9); Ergin Imre (TUR)	
2016	Quantum Racing (4); Botin Partners (2015); Longitud 0 Dalton DeVos (USA); Doug DeVos (USA); Ed Baird (USA); Terry Hutchinson (USA); Ian Moore (GBR); Brett Jones (AUS); Lorenzo Mazza (ITA); Warwick Fleury (NZL); James Dagg (NZL); Piet Van Nieuwenhuijzen (NED); Sean Clarkson (NZL); Rodney Ardern (NZL); Romolo Ranieri (ITA); Jared Henderson (NZL); Matt Cassidy (USA)	Azzurra (3); Designer - Botin Partners (2015); Builder - King Marine, Valencia Pablo Roemmers (ITA); Alberto Roemmers (ITA)	Provezza 9 Designer - Vrolijk (2015); Builder - Cookson Ergin Imre (TUR)	
2017	Platoon (3); Designer - Vrolijk (2015); Builder - Premier Yachts Harm Müller-Spreer (GER); John Kostecki (USA); Jordi Calafat (ESP); Johan Barne (SWE); Dirk De Ridder (NED); Gerd Habermüller (AUT); Martin Kirketter (25x17px); Ross Halcrow (NZL); Javier De La Plaza (ESP); Victor Mariño (ESP); Michi Müller (25x17px); Pedro Mas (ESP)	Quantum Racing 5 Designer - Botin Partners (2018); Builder - Longitud Cero Doug DeVos (USA)	Azzurra 3 Designer - Botin Partners (2015); Builder - King Marine, Valencia Pablo Roemmers (ITA); Alberto Roemmers (ITA)	
2018	Quantum Racing (5); Designer - Botin Partners (2018); Longitud Cero Dean Barker (NZL); Terry Hutchinson (USA); Ian Moore (GBR); Sean Clarkson (NZL); Maciel Cicchetti (ITA); Warwick Fleury (NZL); James Dagg (NZL); Rodney Ardern (NZL); Piet Van Nieuwenhuijzen (NED); Cooper Dressler (USA); Lara Poljsak (SLO); Matt Cassidy (USA); Greg Gendell (USA)	Azzurra (4); Designer - Botin Partners (2018); Builder - King Marine Pablo Roemmers (ITA); Alberto Roemmers (ITA)	Alegre (2); Designer - Botin Partners (2018); Builder - Longitud Cero Andrés Soriano (USA)	
2019	Platoon (4); Vrolijk (2018); Premier Composites Harm Müller-Spreer (GER); John Kostecki (USA); Jordi Calafat (ESP); Jules Slater (GBR); Victor Mariño (ESP); Javier De La Plaza (ESP); Dirk De Ridder (NED); Martin Kirketter (25x17px); Gerd Habermüller (AUT); Ross Halcrow (NZL); Michi Müller (25x17px); Pepe Ribes (ESP); Pedro Mas (ESP)	Azzurra; Botin Partners (2018); Builder - King Marine Alberto Roemmers (ITA)	Bronenosec (2); Botin Partners (2019); Builder - Longitud Cero Vladimir Liubomirov (RUS)	
2020 Cape Town	Cancelled COVID-19			
2021	Sled (5); Botin Partners (2018); Core Composites Takashi Okura (JPN); Murray Jones (AUS); Adam Beashel (AUS); Andrea Visintini (ITA); Don Cowie (NZL); Robbie Naismith (NZL); Christian Kamp (DEN); Ivan Peute (NED); Andrew McCorquodale (CAN); Ryan Godfrey (AUS); Josh Junior (NZL); Hideki Wakayama (JPN); Norio Igei (JPN); Jeremy Lomas (NZL)	Quantum Racing (5); Designer - Botin Partners (2018); Builder - Longitud Cero	Platoon (4); Designer - Vrolijk (2018); Builder - Premier Composites	
2022	Quantum Racing (5); Botin Partners (2018); Longitud Cero Doug Devos (USA); Terry Hutchinson (USA); Sean Clarkson (NZL); Lucas Calabrese (ARG); Michele Ivaldi (ITA); Federico Michetti (ITA); Warwick Fleury (NZL); James Dagg (NZL); Greg Gendell (USA); Matt Cassidy (USA); Rodney Ardern (NZL); Trevor Burd (USA); Piet Van Nieuwenhuijzen (NED); Lara Poljsak (SLO)	Platoon (4); Designer - Vrolijk (2018); Builder - Premier Composites Harm Müller-Spreer (GER)	Alegre (2); Designer - Botin Partners (2018); Builder - Longitud Cero Andy Soriano (GBR)	
2023	Platoon GER 52; Designer - Judel/Vrolijk (2018); Builder - Premiere Composites Harm Müller-Spreer (GER); Vasco Vascotto (ITA); Jordi Calafat (ESP); Jules Salter (GBR); Javier De La Plaza (ESP); Dirk de Ridder (NED); Ross Halcrow (NZL); Sean Couvreux (USA); Michael Müller (GER); Jaro Furlani (ITA); Gerd Habermüller (AUT); Andreas Axelsson (SWE); Victor Mariño (ESP)	TUR 1212 - Provessa; Judel/Vrolijk (2018); Builder - Perscio (ITA) Veli Ergin Imre (TUR); John Cutler (NZL); Hamish Pepper (NZL); Nacho Postigo (ESP); Grant Loretz (NZL); Daniel Fong (NZL); James Baxter (NZL); Joan Fullana (ESP); Kivanc Sevinc (TUR); Samim Togan Alper (TUR); Matthew Barber (GBR); Pietro Mantovani (ITA); Mariano Parada (ARG); Brad Farrand (NZL)	GBR 11152X - Gladiator; Botín Partners (2017); Builder - Longitud Cero Guillermo Parada (ARG); Tony Langley (GBR); Bruno Zirilli (ITA); Simon Fry (GBR); Chris Hosking (AUS); Andrew Estcourt (NZL); Mo Gray (GBR); Jeoff Povey (GBR); Francesco Scalici (ITA); Joey Newton (AUS); David Vera (ESP); Bradley Mclaughlin (GBR); Matt Cornwell (GBR)	
2024	Gladiator - GBR 11152X (4); Botín Partners (2017); Longitud Cero Guillermo Parada (ARG); Tony Langley (GBR); Bruno Zirilli (ITA); Chris Hosking (AUS); Andrew Estcourt (NZL); Jeoff Povey (GBR); Carlo Huisman (NED); Francesco Scalici (ITA); Simon Fry (GBR); Joey Newton (AUS); David Vera (ESP); Bradley Mclaughlin (GBR); Matt Cornwell (GBR)	Sled - USA 5095 (05); Designer - Botin Partners (2018); Builder - Core Composites Takashi Okura (JPN); Andrea Visintini (ITA); Adrian Stead (GBR); Murray Jones (AUS); Jeremy Lomas (NZL); Hideki Wakayama (JPN); Don Cowie (NZL); Christian Kamp (DEN); Ryan Godfrey (AUS); Cian Guilfoyle (IRL); Andrew Mccorquodale (CAN); Simon Johnson (USA); Norio Igei (JPN); Ivan Peute (NED)	Platoon Aviation (3) - GER 52 (01); Designer - Botin Partners (2024); Builder - King Marine Harm Müller-Spreer (GER); Vasco Vascotto (ITA); Jordi Calafat (ESP); Jules Salter (GBR); Victor Marino (ESP); Gerd Habermüller (AUT); Dirk De Ridder (NED); Andreas Axelsson (SWE); Ross Halcrow (NZL); Javier De La Plaza (ESP); Jaro Furlani (ITA); Michi Müller (GER); Sean Doggie (GER)	
2025	USA (01) - Quantum American Magic Design - Botin Partners (2018); Builder Longitud Cero; Harry Melges IV (USA); Terry Hutchinson (USA); Victor Diaz De Leon (USA); Sara Stone (USA); Sean Clarkson (NZL); James Dagg (NZL); Ian Liberty (USA); Matt Cassidy (USA); Norman Berge (USA); Lara Poljsak (SLO); Greg Gendell (USA); Lucas Calabrese (ARG); Trevor Burd (USA); Luke Mueller (USA)	FRA 5211 - Paprec (4) Design - Botin Partners (2019); Builder - Longitud Cero; Cedric Chateau (FRA); Loick Peyron (FRA); Jean-Charles Monnet (FRA); Jean-Marie Dauris (FRA); Stephane Neve (FRA); Valentin Sipan (FRA); Steven Lorizou (FRA); Jean-Pierre Goyat (FRA); Clement Meister (FRA); Matthieu Malledant (FRA); Maxime Mazard (FRA); Yves-Marie Pilon (FRA)	USA 5095 (05) - Sled Design - Botin Partners (2018); Builder - Core Composites; Takashi Okura (JPN); Francesco Bruni (ITA); Murray Jones (AUS); Andrea Visintini (ITA); Jeremy Lomas (NZL); Simon Johnson (USA); Don Cowie (NZL); Ryan Godfrey (AUS); Christian Kamp (DEN); Cian Guilfoyle (IRL); Hideki Wakayama (JPN); Andrew Mccorquodale (CAN); Norio Igei (JPN); Ivan Peute (NED)	
2026	USA 5095 (05) - Sled Design - Botin Partners (2018); Builder - Core Composites; Takashi Okura (JPN); Francesco Bruni (ITA); Murray Jones (AUS); Andrea Visintini (ITA); Don Cowie (NZL); Ryan Godfrey (AUS); Christian Kamp (DEN); Jeremy Lomas (NZL); Ivan Peute (NED); Ash Edwards (NZL); Andrew McCorquodale (CAN); Cian Guilfoyle (IRL); Hideki Wakayama (JPN); Simon Johnson (IRL)	Trinity SWE Designer - Botin Partners (2026); Builder - King Marine, Valencia; Joakim Sundberg (SWE); Ed Baird (USA); Johan Barne (SWE); Rodney Daniel (AUS); Marcus Höglander (SWE); Giulio Desiderato (ITA); Andreas Axelsson (SWE); Markus Lagerquist (SWE); Ross Halcrow (NZL); Oscar Andersson (SWE); Nils Åkervall (SWE); Emil Forsgren (SWE); Gustav Petterson (SWE)	Platoon Aviation GER Botin Partners (2024); King Marine; Harm Müller-Spreer (GER); Vasco Vascotto (ITA); Juan Vila (ESP); Jordi Calafat (ESP); Victor Marino (ESP); Dirk De Ridder (NED); Gerd Habermüller (AUT); Oisin Mclelland (GBR); Grattan Roberts (IRL); Maciel Cicchetti (ITA); Javier De La Plaza (ESP); Michael Mueller (GER); Matteo Ramian (ITA)	
