= 2025 in sailing =

2025 in sailing describes the year's events in sailing

== Passing ==
- Andy Cassell (GBR) - Paralympian and disabled sailing ambassador
- Line Markert = World Sailing Vice President
- John Dinsdale - HobieCat Europe

== Major Offshore Sailing ==
- RORC Admiral's Cup
- 2024-2025 Vendee Globe
- Rolex 2025 Fastnet Race
- Rolex 2025 Sydney to Hobart Yacht Race
- Rolex Middle Sea Race
- Rolex NYYC Invitational Cup
- 2025 Transat Cafe-L'Or formerly the TJV

== World championships ==
Event		Host		Winners		Participation		Ref.
Date	Title	Club	Country	Event	Winners	Boats	Nats	Ref.
2024 World Championship held in 2025
Jan	2024 Moth World Championship	Manly Sailing Club	New Zealand	Open	Mattias Coutts (NZL)	67	14	
Feb	2024 Contender World Championship	Pensacola Yacht Club	United States	Open	Graeme Willcox (GBR)	35	7	
World Sailing - Events
	ISAF Team Racing World Championship	New York Yacht Club	United States		Will Bailey (USA); Doug Sabin (USA); Allison Ferraris (USA); Langdon Mitchell (USA); Tim Wadlow (USA); Forbes Barber (USA); Christina Pandapas (USA); Peter Fleming (USA)			
Dec	Youth Sailing World Championships	Villamora	Portugal	ILCA Male	David COATES (USA)			
Dec	Youth Sailing World Championships	Villamora	Portugal	ILCA Female	Irene de TOMÁS (ESP)			
Dec	Youth Sailing World Championships	Villamora	Portugal	IQ Foil Male	Peleg RAJUAN (ISR)			
Dec	Youth Sailing World Championships	Villamora	Portugal	IQ Foil Female	Medea Marisa FALCIONI (ITA)			
Dec	Youth Sailing World Championships	Villamora	Portugal	Kite Male	Medea Marisa FALCIONI (ITA)			
Dec	Youth Sailing World Championships	Villamora	Portugal	Kite Female	Suofeiya LI (CHN)			
Dec	Youth Sailing World Championships	Villamora	Portugal	420 Open/Mix	Sviatoslav MADONICH (UKR); Dmytro KARABADZHAK (UKR)			
Dec	Youth Sailing World Championships	Villamora	Portugal	420 Female	Sabine POTTER (GBR); Merle NIEUWLAND (GBR)			
Dec	Youth Sailing World Championships	Villamora	Portugal	29er Male/Mix	Szymon KOLKA (POL); Bartosz ZMUDZINSKI (POL)			
Dec	Youth Sailing World Championships	Villamora	Portugal	29er Female	Lila EDWARDS (GBR); Amelie HISCOCKS (GBR)			
Dec	Youth Sailing World Championships	Villamora	Portugal	Nacra 15 Mixed	Lorenzo SIRENA (ITA); Alice DESSY (ITA)			
Sept. 22 – Oct. 1	Mixed Offshore Double World Championship	Royal Ocean Racing Club	United Kingdom	Mixed	Théa Khelif (FRA); Thomas André (FRA)			
Sept. 16-20	Women's Match Racing World Championship	Chicago Yacht Club	United States	Female	Pauline Courtois (FRA); Maëlenn Lemaitre (FRA); Louise Acker (FRA); Sophie Faguet (FRA); Laurane Mettraux (FRA)	12		
July	Youth Match Racing World Championship	Gdynia	Poland	Under	Marin Micoulot (FRA); Camille Pfaff (FRA); Aristide Delin (FRA); Clarisse Baissa (FRA)			
Dec	World Sailing Inclusion Championships	Mussanah Sailing School	Oman	RS Venture Connect	Piotr CICHOCKI (POL); Olga GORNAS-GRUDZIEN (POL)			
Dec	World Sailing Inclusion Championships	Mussanah Sailing School	Oman	Hansa 303 (single format)	Rory McKinna (GBR)			
Dec	World Sailing Inclusion Championships	Mussanah Sailing School	Oman	ILCA (intellectual impairments)				
Dec	World Sailing Inclusion Championships	Mussanah Sailing School	Oman	FarEast 28R (blind sailing)				
Dec	World Sailing Inclusion Championships	Mussanah Sailing School	Oman	Seated Wing Foiling	Cancelled			
July	Esailing World Championship	Gdynia	Poland	Open	Tristan Peron (FRA)			
	Match Racing							
World Sailing Authorised
May	International Radio Sailing Association / 10 Rater World Championship		France	Open	Ante Kovacevic (CRO)	45		
	International Radio Sailing Association / One Metre World Championship	Held alternate years						
May	International Radio Sailing Association / Marblehead World Championship		France	Open	Christophe Boisnault (FRA)	62		
Aug.	Offshore Racing Congress / ORCi World Championships	Kalev Yacht Club	Estonia	Class 0	Niklas Zennström (SWE) Adrian Stead (GBR); Tim Powell (GBR); Steve Hayles (GBR); Justin Slattery (IRL); Toby Iles (GBR); Thomas Kiff (NZL); Griffin Spinney (USA); Joy Fitzgerald (GBR); Mark Lees (GBR)	8		
Aug.	Offshore Racing Congress / ORCi World Championships	Kalev Yacht Club	Estonia	Class B	Jeppe Borch (DEN) Jesper Radich (DEN); Gonzalo Araújo (ESP); Rasmus Taatø (DEN); Thor Malthe Andersen (DEN); Matias Rossing (DEN); Enrico Turin (ITA); Gustav Schwennesen (DEN); Mads Christian Taatø (DEN); Ross Vickers (AUS)	22		
Aug.	Offshore Racing Congress / ORCi World Championships	Kalev Yacht Club	Estonia	Class C	Patrik Forsgren (SWE) Emil Forsgren (SWE); Zacharias Krafft (SWE); Alvina Johansson (FIN); Claudia Söderberg (SWE); Sam Stenman (FIN); Thomas Tennström (FIN); Noa Bergstran (SWE)	34		
Sept. 7-13	Offshore Racing Congress / ORC Double-Handed World Championship	Yacht Club Monfalcone	Italy	Class A	Martin Buck (GER); Yves de Block (GER)			
Sept. 7-13	Offshore Racing Congress / ORC Double-Handed World Championship	Yacht Club Monfalcone	Italy	Class B	Massimo Juris; Pietro Luciani			
Sept. 7-13	Offshore Racing Congress / ORC Double-Handed World Championship	Yacht Club Monfalcone	Italy	Class C	Lars Bergkvist (SWE); Anders Dahlsjo (SWE)			
	World Sailing Special Event; PWA World Tour	Various		Male	Matteo Iachino			
	World Sailing Special Event; PWA World Tour	Various		Female	Justine Lemeteyer			
World Sailing - Single Person Dinghy
July 28 -3Aug.	Contender World Championship	Fraglia Vela Malcesine	Italy	Open	Mark Bulka (AUS)	167		
Aug 1-7	Europe World Championships	Torbole	Italy	Male	Andreas Svensson (DEN)	83		
Aug 1-7	Europe World Championships	Torbole	Italy	Female	Camilla Svensson (DEN)	57		
Sept. 1-6	Finn World Championship	Cascais	Portugal	Open	Deniss Karpak (EST)	78		
June	Finn Masters World Championship	Medemblik	Netherlands	Open +40	Peter-Jan Postma (NED)	301	28	
July 19-26	ILCA 4 World Championships	Cabrillo Beach Yacht Club	United States	Male 12-18	Konstantinos Portosalte (GRE)	140		
July 19-26	ILCA 4 World Championships	Cabrillo Beach Yacht Club	United States	Female 12-18	Blanca Ferrando Babe (ESP)	100		
July 28 -Aug 4	Youth ILCA 6 World Championship	Cabrillo Beach Yacht Club	United States	Male 15-18	Hermionie Ghicas (GRE)	140		
July 28 -Aug 4	Youth ILCA 6 World Championship	Cabrillo Beach Yacht Club	United States	Female 15-18	Alessandro Cirinei (ITA)	81		
Aug. 22-29	ILCA 6 Female Under 21 World Championship	The National Yacht Club, Ireland; Royal St George Yacht Club	Ireland	Female Under 21	Roos Wind (NED)	73		
June	ILCA 6 Male World Championship	Kieler Woche	Germany	Male - U21	Alessandro Cirinei (ITA)	124		
Sept. 19-28	ILCA 6 Masters World Championships	Circolo Nautico Caposele	Italy	6 - Apprentice	Marcin Rudawski (POL)	23	9	
Sept. 19-28	ILCA 6 Masters World Championships	Circolo Nautico Caposele	Italy	6 - Masters	Jon Emmett (GBR)	34	14	
Sept. 19-28	ILCA 6 Masters World Championships	Circolo Nautico Caposele	Italy	6 - Grand Masters	Carlos Martinez (ESP)	92	17	
Sept. 19-28	ILCA 6 Masters World Championships	Circolo Nautico Caposele	Italy	6 - Great Grand Masters	Gilles Coadou (FRA)	73	22	
Sept. 19-28	ILCA 6 Masters World Championships	Circolo Nautico Caposele	Italy	6 - Legends	Robert Lowndes (AUS)	30	16	
May 10-17	ILCA 6 Female World Championship	Qingdao	China	Female	Louis Cervera (FRA)			
Aug. 22-29	ILCA 7 Under 21 Male World Championship]	The National Yacht Club, Ireland; Royal St George Yacht Club	Ireland	Male Under 21	Ole Schweckendiek (GER)	137		
May 10-17	ILCA 7 World Championship	Qingdao	China	Male	Willem Wiersema (NED)			
Sept. 19-28	ILCA 7 Masters World Championships	Circolo Nautico Caposele	Italy	7 - Apprentice	Matej Valic (SLO)	20	13	
Sept. 19-28	ILCA 7 Masters World Championships	Circolo Nautico Caposele	Italy	7 - Masters	Bruno Fontes (BRA)	38	16	
Sept. 19-28	ILCA 7 Masters World Championships	Circolo Nautico Caposele	Italy	7 - Grand Masters	Brett Beyer (AUS)	91	20	
Sept. 19-28	ILCA 7 Masters World Championships	Circolo Nautico Caposele	Italy	7 - Great Grand & Legends	Jose Luis Doreste (ESP)	44	19	
July 7-13	Moth World Championship	Fraglia Vela Malcesine	Italy	Open	Enzo BALANGER (FRA)			
Jan	Musto Skiff World Championship	Woollahra Sailing Club	Australia	Open	Andy Tarboton (RSA) (GBR)	39	7	
July 16-23	O'PEN Skiff World Championships	Windward Sailing Club	Japan	Open - U13	Louis LeRourneur (FRA)	32		
July 16-23	O'PEN Skiff World Championships	Windward Sailing Club	Japan	Open - U17	Puls Kaison (AUS)	61		
Sept. 12-19	OK Dinghy World Championship	Circolo Vela Arco	Italy	Open	Andrew Mills GBR			
June 28 – 5 July	Optimist World Championship	Jadralni klub pirat Portorož	Slovenia	Team	UNKNOWN (ESP); UNKNOWN (ESP); UNKNOWN (ESP)			
June 28 – 5 July	Optimist World Championship	Jadralni klub pirat Portorož	Slovenia	Open	Nikolaos Pappas (GRE)	287	66	
July 28 - 2 Aug	RS Aero World Championships	Ecole Nationale VSN	France	5	Raphael Olsthoorn (FRA)	62	12	
July 28 - 2 Aug	RS Aero World Championships	Ecole Nationale VSN	France	6	Sofiia Naumenko (UKR)	50	11	
July 28 - 2 Aug	RS Aero World Championships	Ecole Nationale VSN	France	7	Peter Barton (GBR)	40	10	
July 28 - 2 Aug	RS Aero World Championships	Ecole Nationale VSN	France	9	Baabii O Flower (CAN)	15	7	
Aug. 3-8	RS Tera World Championships	Jachetní Klub Černá v Pošumaví	Czech Republic	Sport	Hari Clark (GBR)	40		
Aug. 3-8	RS Tera World Championships	Jachetní Klub Černá v Pošumaví	Czech Republic	Pro	Rafe Bradley (GBR)	35		
Dec 7-14	Sunfish World Championship	Salinas Yacht Club	Ecuador	Open	Simon Gomez Ortiz (COL)	84		
July 19-25	Topper World Championships	Royal Yacht Club Hollandia	Netherlands	Open 4.2	Feiran Wan (CHN)	43		
July 19-25	Topper World Championships	Royal Yacht Club Hollandia	Netherlands	Open 5.3	Sam Mason (GBR)	131		
July 4-13	Zoom 8 World Championships	Warnemünder Woche	Germany	Open	Sisu Selio (FIN)	38		
World Sailing - Two Person Dinghy
Aug. 1-8	29er World Championship		Portugal	Open	Nicklas Holt (NOR); Philip Forslund (NOR)			
Oct. 7-12	49er World Championship	Yacht Club Cagliari	Italy	49er Male	Diego Botín; Florián Trittel			
Oct. 7-12	49er World Championship	Yacht Club Cagliari	Italy	49FX Female	Paula Barceló; María Cantero			
Jul 30 -Aug	49er Junior World Championships	Royal Danish Yacht Club	Denmark	49er Male	Kjell HASCHEN; Iven Anton FROMM	53		
Jul 30 -Aug	49er Junior World Championships	Royal Danish Yacht Club	Denmark	49FX Female	Katharina SCHWACHHOFER; Elena STOLTZE	29		
July	420 World Championships		Turkey	Male & Mixed	Said Royo (BRA); Bernardo Oliveira (BRA)	101	20	
July	420 World Championships		Turkey	Female	Neus Fernández Darder (ESP); Martina Gomila Darder (ESP)	84	11	
July	420 World Championships		Turkey	U17 Open	Eleni Galazoula (GRE); Stavros Aronis (GRE)	81	13	
June 6-14	470 World Championships		Poland	Mixed	Jordi Xammar Hernandez (ESP); Marta Cardona Alcántara (ESP)	48	19	
July 7-12	470 Junior World Championships	Club Náutico Mar Menor	Spain	Mixed U24	Roy Levy (ISR); Ariel Gal (ISR)			
Jan	505 World Championship	Adelaide Sailing Club	Australia	Open	Sandy Higgins (AUS); Paul Marsh (AUS)	70	6	
Jan	B14 World Championship	Woollahra Sailing Club	Australia	Open	Chris Bateman (IRL); Lucy Loughton (IRL)	30	3	
Aug 3-9	Cadet World Championship		Czech Republic	Open	Uliana Postrelko (UKR); Katerina Butenko (UKR)			
	Enterprise World Championship							
Aug. 22-29	Fireball World Championship	Circolo Vela Arco	Italy	Open	Yves Mermod (SUI); Maja Siegenthale (SUI)	136		
N/A	Flying Junior World Championship	Bi Annual not held in 2025						
April 5-12	Flying Dutchman World Championship	Club Nautico Puerto Sherry	Spain	Open	Kilian Koenig (GER); Johannes Brack (GER)	60		
	GP14 World Championship							
June	Lightning World Championship	Yacht Club de Voula	Greece	Open	Felipe Robles (CHI); Andres Guevara (CHI); Paula Herman (CHI)	40	10	
N/A	Youth Lightning World Championship	Held alternate years						
June	Masters Lightning World Championship	Yacht Club of Voula	Greece	Open	Augie Diaz (USA); UNKNOWN; UNKNOWN	17		
April	Mirror World Championship	Durban Beach Club	South Africa	Open	James Komweibel (AUS); Harry Komweibel (AUS)	33	3	
Aug. 4-8	RS500 World Championship	Gruppo Vela LNI Follonica	Italy	Open	Gabriele Corsi (ITA); Giulia Galletti (ITA)	41	7	
July 26 - Aug 1	RS Feva World Championship	Club Nautique Voile d'Aix les Bains	France	Open	David Vogl (AUT); Valentin Vogl (AUT)	168		
N/A	Open Snipe World Championship	Held alternate years						
N/A	Youth Snipe World Championship	Held alternate years						
July 22-27	Female Snipe World Championship	Enoshima	Japan	Female	Ai Yoshida (JPN); Honoka Miura (JPN)	34	6	
Dec 6-12	Masters Snipe World Championship	Cofradía Náutica de Frutillar	Chile					
July 14-21	Tasar World Championship	Circolo Vela Arco	Italy	Open	Nick Craig (GBR); Toby Lewis (GBR)	36	8	
July 13-19	Vaurien World Championship	Centro Vela Bracciano	Italy	Open	Niccolo' Bertola (ITA); Mattia Saggio (ITA)	92		
World Sailing - Multihull Classes
	Diam 24 World Championship							
Nov. 8-16	A-Cat World Championship	Milford Cruising Club	New Zealand	Foiling	Jakub Surowiec (POL)			
Nov. 8-16	A-Cat World Championship	Milford Cruising Club	New Zealand	Classic	Jacek Noetzel (POL)			
July 19-25	Dart 18 World Championship	Watersportvereniging Zandvoort	Netherlands	Open	Vincent Bouvier (FRA); Fanny Merelle (FRA)	70	10	
July 26–31	Formula 16 World Championship	Medemblik	Netherlands	Open	Emmanuel le CHAPELIER (FRA); Eric le BOUËDEC (FRA)	31		
July 4-11	Formula 18 World Championship	Royal Yacht Club Hollandia	Netherlands	Open	Darren Bundock (AUS); Bjarne Bouwer (NED)	96	17	
	Raid Formula 18 World Championship		France	Open	Emeric Dary (FRA); David Fanouillere (FRA)	19	5	
	GS32 World Championship							
	Hobie 14 World Championship							
	Hobie 16 World Championships							
	Hobie Dragoon World Championship							
	Hobie F18 World Championship							
Nov 17-22	M32 World Championship	Miami	United States	Open	Ryan McKillen (USA); Taylor Canfield; Sam Loughborough; Stewart Dodson; Luke Payne	10		
July 5-12	Nacra 15 World Championship	La Rochelle	France	Open	Lorenzo Sirena (ITA); Alice Dessy (ITA)	79		
Oct. 7-12	Nacra 17 World Championship	Cagliari	Italy	Mixed	John Gimson (GBR); Anna Burnet (GBR)			
	Nacra 20 World Championship							
	Topcat K1 World Championships							
July 18-25	Tornado World Championships	Nautical Club of Kalamaria Thessaloniki	Greece	Open	Nikolaos Mavros (GRE); Polydoros Parianos (GRE)	19	8	
World Sailing - Keelboat Classes
Oct. 7-12	2.4 Metre World Championship	Fraglia Vela Malcesine	Italy	Open	Jeffrey LINTON (USA)			
June 9-13	5.5 Metre World Championship	Sopot	Poland	Open	Peter Morton (GBR); Andrew Palfrey (AUS); Ruairidh Scott (GBR)	20	11	
Sept. 17-27	6 Metre World Championship	Seawanhaka Corinthian Yacht Club	United States	Modern	Eberhard Magg (GER); Mattias Benedikt Paschen-Schauenburg (GER); Dieter Schoen (GER); Alvaro Manuel Silveira Marinho (POR); Markus Wieser (GER)			
Sept. 17-27	6 Metre World Championship	Seawanhaka Corinthian Yacht Club	United States	Classic	Alejandro Abascal (ESP); Pedro Campos (ESP); Eduardo Marin (ESP); Alberto Puga (ESP)			
Aug 2-9	8 Metre World Cup	Turku	Finland	Open	Jean Fabre (SUI); David Genier (SUI); Manuel Stern (SUI); Cedric Senften (SUI); Marc Stern (SUI); Alec Ardin (SUI); Jean Fabre Jnr. (SUI)	21		
	12 Metre World Championship							
Apr	Dragon World Championship	Villamora	Portugal	Open	Andy Beadsworth (GBR); Simon Fry (GBR); Enes Cąylak (TUR)	50	25	
Jan	Etchells World Championship	Royal Brighton Yacht Club	Australia	Open	Graeme Taylor (AUS); Ben Lamb (AUS); James Mayo (AUS)	46	8	
Aug. 15-21	Flying Fifteen World Championship	Weymouth and Portland National Sailing Academy	United Kingdom	Open	Graham Vials (GBR); Chris Turner (GBR)	81	9	
March	2.3 Hansa World Championships	Royal Prince Alfred Yacht Club	Australia	Open	Yui Fujimoto (JPN)	10		
March	1x303 Hansa World Championships	Royal Prince Alfred Yacht Club	Australia	Open	Gauthier Bril (FRA)	75		
March	2x303 Hansa World Championships	Royal Prince Alfred Yacht Club	Australia	Open	Rory McKinna (GBR); Jess Wong (GBR)	44		
March	Liberty Hansa World Championships	Royal Prince Alfred Yacht Club	Australia	Open	Yuen Wai Foo (HKG)	32		
May 26 - June 1	H-Boat World Championship	Segelclub Ebensee	Austria	Open	Flavio Favini (ITA); Simona Hoellermann (AUT); Stefano Rizzi (ITA); Nicola Bonarrigo (ITA)	69	9	
Sept. 20-27	Melges 24 World Championship	Yacht Club Adriaco	United States	Open	Peter David KARRIÉ; Alessandro FRANCI; Niccolo BIANCHI; Saverio CIGLIANO; Karlo HMELJAK	67		
July 7-12	Micro World Championship		Poland	Open	Sophia Schenk (GER); Sven Michael (GER); Lukas van der Heeden (GER)			
Oct. 7-12	J/22 World Championship	Lega Navale Italiana Napoli	Italy	Open	Jean-Michel Lautier (NED); Giuseppe D'Aquino (NED); Denis Neves (NED)			
Sept. 6-15	J/24 World Championship	Plym Yacht Club; Saltash Sailing Club	United Kingdom	Open	Cillian Dickson (IRL); Ryan Glynn (IRL); Sam O’Byrne (IRL); Louis Molloy (IRL); Marcus Ryan (IRL)	50	12+	
Oct. 24- 1-Nov.	J/70 World Championship	Yacht Club Argentino	Argentina	Open	Laura Grondin (USA); Taylor Canfield (ISV); Ian Liberty (USA); Edward Hackney (AUS)	71	15+	
Sept. 22-27	Corinthian J/70 World Championship	Eastern Yacht Club	United States	Open	Alec Cutler; Ryan Cox; Brad Rodi; Charles Pucciariello	29		
June 26-29	Mixed J/70 World Championship	Circolo Vela Torbole	Italy	Open	Joan Cardona Méndez (ESP); Gerardo Prego Menor (ESP); Cristina Pujol Bajo (ESP); Fátima Diz Barreras (ESP); Pilar Amaro Filgueira (ESP)	47		
July 5-11	J/80 World Championship	Nieuwpoort	Belgium	Open	Javier Padron Torrent (ESP); Jon Larrazabal Lallana (ESP); Daniel Enrique De La Pedraja Yllera (ESP); Alberto Padron Torrent (ESP); Alba Ponce La Camera (ESP)	58		
Sept. 29 - 4 Oct.	Platu 25 World Championship	Ancona	Italy	Open	Francesco Lanera (ITA); UNKNOWN; UNKNOWN; UNKNOWN; UNKNOWN	20	5	
Aug. 27-31	RC44 World Championship		Netherlands	Open	Chris Bake (GBR) Cameron Appleton (NZL); Andrew Estcourt (NZL); Aaron Cooper (GBR); Sara Stone (USA); Grace Bake (USA); Jonas Hviid Nielsen (DEN); Scott Ewing (USA); Andrew Bake (USA); Matt Cassidy (USA) || 12 ||			
Sept. 24-27	RS21 World Championship	Porto Rotondo, Sardinia	Italy	Open	Marco Pocci; Giacomo Ferrari; Bertuzzi giorgia giovanni meloni	49		
Jan	SB20 World Championship	ONE°15 Marina Sentosa Cove	Singapore	Open	GBR-3834 - Xcellent; John Pollard (GBR); Henry Wetherell (GBR); David Chapman (AUS)	53	13	
May 10-16	Shark 24 World Championship	Segelclub Altmünster	Austria	Open	Christian Binder (AUT); Thomas Czajka (AUT); Stefan Watamaniuk (AUT)	38		
Nov	Soling World Championship	Veleiros do Sul	Brazil	Open	Cícero Hartmann (BRA); Frederico Sidou (BRA); Regis Silva (BRA)			
N/A	Sonar World Championship	Held alternate years						
Sept. 8-14	Star World Championship	JK Mornar	Croatia	Open	Paul Cayard (USA); Frithjof Kleen (GER)	101	19	
	Viper 640 World Championship							
Aug. 16-23	Tempest World Championship	Hoorn	Netherlands	Open	Lars Bähr (GER); Leif Bähr (GER)	26		
July 18-25	Yngling World Championship		Netherlands	Open	Yska Minks (NED); Wouter Toornstra (NED); Barbara Huber (NED)	52		
World Sailing - Yacht Classes
June	ClubSwan 50 World Championship	Yacht Club Costa Smeralda	Italy	Open	Hendrik Brandis (GER); Shane Elliott (RSA); Elisa Mangani (ITA); Manuel Weiller Vidal (ESP); Maximilian Stein (GER); Nikolaus Beulke (GER); Arnd Howar (GER); Lorenzo De Felice (ITA); Pierluigi De Felice (ITA); Robin Jacobs (NED); Elliot Willis (GBR); Taavi Valter Taveter (EST)	12	3	
	Fareast 28r World Championship							
Series	IMOCA 60 World Championship	oPEN						
Oct. 6-11	L30 World Championship	Yacht Club Sanremo	Italy	Open	Attila BAKONYI (HUN); UNKNOWN; UNKNOWN; UNKNOWN; UNKNOWN	15	8+	
July	TP52 World Championship	Clube Naval de Cascais	Portugal	Open	Harry Melges IV (USA) Terry Hutchinson (USA); Victor Diaz De Leon (USA); Sara Stone (USA); Sean Clarkson (NZL); James Dagg (NZL); Ian Liberty (USA); Matt Cassidy (USA); Norman Berge (USA); Lara Poljsak (SLO); Greg Gendell (USA); Lucas Calabrese (ARG); Trevor Burd (USA); Luke Mueller (USA)	11	22	
BOARD CLASSES
Sept. 9-13	Formula Windsurfing World Championship	Torbole	Italy	Open/Foil	Fabian Wolf (GER)	34		
Sept. 24-28	IWSA Formula Wing World Championship	Chia Wind Club	Italy	Male	Mathis Ghio (FRA)	71		
Sept. 24-28	IWSA Formula Wing World Championship	Chia Wind Club	Italy	Female	Maddalena Spanu (ITA)	20		
Sept. 28 -5 Oct	IKA Formula Kite World Championships	Quartu Sant'Elena, Sardinia	Italy	Male	Riccardo Pianosi (ITA)			
Sept. 28 -5 Oct	IKA Formula Kite World Championships	Quartu Sant'Elena, Sardinia	Italy	Female	Jessie Kampman (NED)			
Oct.26 -Nov 1	IKA Youth World Championships	Praia da Vitoria, Azores	Portugal	Male	Riccardo Pianosi (ITA)	35		
Oct.26 -Nov 1	IKA Youth World Championships	Praia da Vitoria, Azores	Portugal	Female	Catalina Turienzo (ARG)	9	7	
Aug. 12-17	IFCA Slalom World Championships	ALAÇATI	Turkey	Fin - Male	NOT COMPLETED			
Aug. 12-17	IFCA Slalom World Championships	ALAÇATI	Turkey	Fin - Female	NOT COMPLETED			
Aug. 12-17	IFCA Slalom World Championships	ALAÇATI	Turkey	Fin - Master	NOT COMPLETED			
Aug. 12-17	IFCA Slalom World Championships	ALAÇATI	Turkey	Fin - Youth Male	Sacha Fortune (FRA)			
Aug. 12-17	IFCA Slalom World Championships	ALAÇATI	Turkey	Fin - Youth Female	Damla Kurtdemir (TUR)			
Aug. 12-17	IFCA Slalom World Championships	ALAÇATI	Turkey	Fin - Junior Male	NOT COMPLETED			
Aug. 12-17	IFCA Slalom World Championships	ALAÇATI	Turkey	Fin - Junior Female	NOT COMPLETED			
Aug. 12-17	IFCA Slalom World Championships	ALAÇATI	Turkey	Foil - Open	Johan Soe (DEN)			
Aug. 12-17	IFCA Slalom World Championships	ALAÇATI	Turkey	Foil - Youth Female	NOT COMPLETED			
Aug. 12-17	IFCA Slalom World Championships	ALAÇATI	Turkey	Foil - Youth Female	NOT COMPLETED			
July	iQFoil World Championships	Aahus	Denmark	Male	Andy Brown (sailor) (GBR)	117		
July	iQFoil World Championships	Aahus	Denmark	Female	Emma Wilson (GBR)	79		
Sept. 6-13	iQFoil U23 World Championships	Portimão	Portugal	<U23 - Male	Grae MORRIS (AUS)			
Sept. 6-13	iQFoil U23 World Championships	Portimão	Portugal	<U23 - Female	Stella BILGER (NZL)			
Oct. 20-25	Raceboard World Championships	Mandelieu	France	U21 - Male	Ignacio FERNANDEZ (ESP)	17		
Oct. 20-25	Raceboard World Championships	Mandelieu	France	U21 - Female	Eloisa TARANCON (ESP)	7	2	
Oct. 20-25	Raceboard World Championships	Mandelieu	France	Male	Joao RODRIGUES (POR)	87		
Oct. 20-25	Raceboard World Championships	Mandelieu	France	Female	Jeanne MAILHOS (FRA)	7	2	
June 9-14	Raceboat Masters World Championship	Holčíkovce	Slovakia	Open 40+	MAKSYMILIAN WOJCIK	50		
Apr 27 -May 6	Speed Windsurfing World Championship			Male	Antoine Albeau	50		
Apr 27 -May 6	Speed Windsurfing World Championship			Female	Jenna Gibson	5		
Aug. 16-23	Techno 293 World Championships	Pwllheli	United Kingdom	U13 Open	Antal Körtvélyesi HUN	38	9	
Aug. 16-23	Techno 293 World Championships	Pwllheli	United Kingdom	U15 Male	Joshua Castro Jurek ESP	38	11	
Aug. 16-23	Techno 293 World Championships	Pwllheli	United Kingdom	U15 Female	Olivia Sanchez Moral ESP		9	
Aug. 16-23	Techno 293 World Championships	Pwllheli	United Kingdom	U17 Male	Sören Nguema FRA	56	11	
Aug. 16-23	Techno 293 World Championships	Pwllheli	United Kingdom	U17 Female	Lindia Miel Pousa Dios ESP	42	9	
Aug. 16-23	Techno 293 World Championships	Pwllheli	United Kingdom	+Rig Male	Daigo Komatsu JPN	34	10	
Aug. 16-23	Techno 293 World Championships	Pwllheli	United Kingdom	+Rig Female	Teresa Medde ITA	16	8	
	Techno Wind Foil 130 World Championships							
Oct. 11–17	Windsurfer World Championship	Athens	Greece	Open	RICCARDO GIORDANO	123		
	X-15 World Championship							

== Gold Cup Events ==
- 1-4 October: Star Vintage Gold Cup in Gull Lake, Michigan, United States
  - Winners: Luke Lawrence (USA) & Mohammed Asif (IND)
