= 2024 in sailing =

2024 in sailing describes the year's events in sailing

== Passing ==
- Ed Botterell (CAN) Olympian
- William Alexander Abbott Snr. (CAN) Olympian and Boatbuilder
- Tony Morgan (sailor) (GBR) Olympic Silver Medalists

== Major Offshore Sailing ==
- December 25, 2024 – January 2, 2025: Rolex 2024 Sydney to Hobart Yacht Race
- Middle Sea Race

== World championships (INCOMPLETE) ==
Event		Host		Winners		Participation		Ref.
Date	Title	Club	Country	Event	Winnder	Boats	Nats	Ref.
World Sailing Events
23-28 Sep	Offshore Double Handed World Championship		France	Mixed	Maggie Adamson (GBR); Cal Finlayson (GBR)			
22-28 Jun	Blind Match Racing World Championship							
24 Nov	eSailing World Championship			Open	Arthur Farley (GBR)			
27 Nov - 2 Dec	Youth Match Racing World Championship	Jeddah Yacht Club	United Arab Emirates		Cruising Yacht Club of Australia; Cole Tapper; Hamish Vass; Jack Frewin; Chelsea Williams; Joel Beashel			
3-8 Dec	Women’s Match Racing World Championship	Jeddah Yacht Club	United Arab Emirates	Female	Pauline Courtois (FRA); Maëlenn Lemaitre (FRA); Louise Acker (FRA); Sophie Faguet (FRA); Laurane Mettraux (FRA)			
13-20 Jul	Youth Sailing World Championships	Fraglia Vela Riva	Italy; Lake Garda	ILCA - Male	Antonio Pascali (ITA)	62	62	
13-20 Jul	Youth Sailing World Championships	Fraglia Vela Riva	Italy; Lake Garda	ILCA - Female	Maria Vittoria Arseni (ITA)	53	53	
13-20 Jul	Youth Sailing World Championships	Circolo Surf Torbole	Italy; Lake Garda	IQFoil Male	Federico Pilloni (ITA)	38	38	
13-20 Jul	Youth Sailing World Championships	Circolo Surf Torbole	Italy; Lake Garda	IQFoil Female	Carola Colasanto (ITA)	26	26	
13-20 Jul	Youth Sailing World Championships	Circolo Vela Torbole	Italy; Lake Garda	420 Male/Mixed	Lisa Vucetti (ITA); Vittorio Bonifacio (ITA)	24	24	
13-20 Jul	Youth Sailing World Championships	Circolo Vela Torbole	Italy; Lake Garda	420 Female	Danai Giannouli (GRE); Iakovina Kerkezou (GRE)	19	19	
13-20 Jul	Youth Sailing World Championships	Circolo Vela Arco	Italy; Lake Garda	29er Male/Mixed	Ewa Lewandowska (POL); Krzysztof Królik (POL)	29	29	
13-20 Jul	Youth Sailing World Championships	Circolo Vela Arco	Italy; Lake Garda	29er Female	Alicja Dampc (POL); Alicja Tutkowska (POL)	24	24	
13-20 Jul	Youth Sailing World Championships	Lega Navale Italiana Riva del Garda	Italy; Lake Garda	Mixed Nacra 15	Lorenzo Sirena; Alice Dessy	12	12	
13-20 Jul	Youth Sailing World Championships	Fraglia Vela Malcesine	Italy; Lake Garda	Kite	Lucas Pes Fonseca (BRA)	14	14	
13-20 Jul	Youth Sailing World Championships	Fraglia Vela Malcesine	Italy; Lake Garda	Kite	Maria Catalina Turienzo (ARG)	6	6	
World Sailing Authorised Worlds
	10 Rater World Championship	Not Held - Bi-annual						
Oct 20-28	One Metre World Championship	Gladstone Radio Controlled Yacht Club	Australia	Open	Zvonko Jelacic (CRO)	76		
	Marblehead World Championship	Not Held - Bi-annual						
	ORCi World Championships	New York Yacht Club, Newport	United States	Class 0	Victor Wild (USA) Nacho Postigo (ESP); Kelvin Harrap (NZL); Scott Nixon (USA); Chris Hosking (AUS); Andy Horton (USA); Lucas Chapman (AUS); Santiago Lange (ARG); Artie Means (USA); Aidan Naughton (USA); Cooper Dressler (USA); Jareese Finch (ANT); Orrin Starr (USA); Maciel Cicchetti (ITA); Dean Curtis (AUS); Graham Post (USA); Harry West (GBR)			
	ORCi World Championships	New York Yacht Club, Newport	United States	Class A	Austin Fragomen (USA) Gwen Fragomen (USA); UNKNOWN; UNKNOWN; UNKNOWN; UNKNOWN; UNKNOWN; UNKNOWN; UNKNOWN			
	ORCi World Championships	New York Yacht Club, Newport	United States	Class B	Hugo Rocha (POR) Marcin Sutkowski (POL); Stanislaw Bajerski (POL); Mateusz Gwózdz (POL); Aksel Magdahl (NOR); Joan Navarro (ESP); Piotr Przybylski (POL); Kacper Gwózdz (POL)			
	ORC Double-Handed World Championship							
World Sailing Class - One Person Dinghy
2025 Feb	Contender World Championship	Pensacola Yacht Club	United States	Open	Graeme Willcox (GBR)	35	7	
Jul 8-14	Europe World Championships	Hangö Segelförening	Norway	Male	Andreas Svensson (DEN)	55	8	
Jul 8-14	Europe World Championships	Hangö Segelförening	Norway	Female	Anna Livbjerg (DEN)	35	7	
Sep 3-7	Finn World Championship	Sailing Aarhus	Denmark	Open	Oskari Muhonen (FIN)	103	21	
Jun 7-14	Finn Masters World Championship	Royal Yacht Club Hollandia	Netherlands	Open - 39+	Laurent Hay (FRA)	285	29	
Jun 22-30	ILCA 4 World Championships	Viana do Costelo	Portugal	U18 - Male	Carlos Charabati (CAN)	276		
Jun 22-30	ILCA 4 World Championships	Viana do Costelo	Portugal	U18 - Female	Hieke Schraffordt (NED)	150		
July 1-8	U21 ILCA 6 World Championship	Viana do Castelo	Portugal	Female	Eve MCMAHON IRL	80		
Jan 3–10	Women's ILCA 6 World Championship		Argentina	Female	Anne-Marie Rindom (DEN)			
July 1-8	U21 ILCA 7 World Championship	Viana do Castelo	Portugal	Male	Theodor MIDDELTHON (NOR)	155		
Jan 24–31	ILCA 7 World Championship		Australia	Male	Matthew Wearn (AUS)			
Feb 2–10	ILCA 6 Masters World Championships	Adelaide Sailing Club	Australia	Apprentice	Franco Riquelme Antonetti (ARG)	9	8	
Feb 2–10	ILCA 6 Masters World Championships	Adelaide Sailing Club	Australia	Masters	Simon Small (AUS)	21	6	
Feb 2–10	ILCA 6 Masters World Championships	Adelaide Sailing Club	Australia	Grand Masters	Andrew Holdsworth (USA)	45	9	
Feb 2–10	ILCA 6 Masters World Championships	Adelaide Sailing Club	Australia	Great Grand Masters	James Mitchell (AUS)	43		
Feb 2–10	ILCA 6 Masters World Championships	Adelaide Sailing Club	Australia	Legends	William Symes (USA)	19	8	
Feb 2–10	ILCA 7 Masters World Championships	Adelaide Sailing Club	Australia	Apprentice	Luke Deegan (NZL)	12	7	
Feb 2–10	ILCA 7 Masters World Championships	Adelaide Sailing Club	Australia	Masters	Brendan Casey (AUS)	19	4	
Feb 2–10	ILCA 7 Masters World Championships	Adelaide Sailing Club	Australia	Grand Masters	Brett Beyer (AUS)	35	9	
Feb 2–10	ILCA 7 Masters World Championships	Adelaide Sailing Club	Australia	Great Grand & Legends	Steve Gunther (AUS)	19	7	
	Moth World Championship							
	Musto Skiff World Championship							
Feb 24 –Mar 2	OK Dinghy World Championship		Australia	Open	Nick Craig (GBR)			
Jul 28 -2 Aug	O'PEN Skiff World Championship							
Dec 5-15	Optimist World Championship	CNMDP, Mar del Plata	Argentina	Open	Iason Panagopoulos (GRE)	225		
Aug 25-30	RS Aero World Championships	Hayling Island Sailing Club	United Kingdom	5 Open	Georgia Booth (GBR)	50	7	
Aug 25-30	RS Aero World Championships	Hayling Island Sailing Club	United Kingdom	6 Open	Sofiia Naumenko (UKR)	39	5	
Aug 25-30	RS Aero World Championships	Hayling Island Sailing Club	United Kingdom	7 Open	Finley Dickinson (GBR)	64	7	
Aug 25-30	RS Aero World Championships	Hayling Island Sailing Club	United Kingdom	9 Open	Ben Flower (CAN)	19	8	
25-27 Oct	RS Aero Youth Team Racing World Championships							
12-17 Aug	RS Aero Youth World Championship		Sweden	5 Open	Hugo Sköld Orr SWE	39		
12-17 Aug	RS Aero Youth World Championship		Sweden	6 Open	Andrea De Matteis ITA	9		
12-17 Aug	RS Aero Youth World Championship		Sweden	7 Open	Erik Rahm SWE	12		
3-8 Aug	RS Tera World Championships	Sejlklubben Køge Bugt	Denmark	Pro	William Stratton-Brown (GBR)	57	9	
3-8 Aug	RS Tera World Championships	Sejlklubben Køge Bugt	Denmark	Sport	Rafe Bradley (GBR)	61	8	
20-26 Jul	Topper World Championships	Federacíon de Vela Murcia	Spain	5.3 Open	Che Liu (CHN)	138	8	
20-26 Jul	Topper World Championships	Federacíon de Vela Murcia	Spain	4.2 Open	Hari Clark (GBR)	39	5	
14-20 Jul	Musto Skiff World Championship	Weymouth and Portland National Sailing Academy	United Kingdom	Open	Sam Pascoe (GBR)	73	9	
8-14 Jul	Zoom 8 World Championship	Warnemünde Week		Open	Alfred Heinemeier Madsen (DEN)	56	6	
World Sailing Class - Two Person Dinghy
31 Jul -10 Aug	29er World Championship	Aarhus Sejlklub	Denmark	Open	Alex Demurtas (ITA); Giovanni Santi (ITA)	258	27	
16-21 Jul	49er Junior World Championships							
16-21 Jul	49erFX Junior World Championships							
4–10 March	49er & 49er FX World Championships		Spain	Male	Erwan Fischer (FRA) & Clément Pequin (FRA)			
4–10 March	49er & 49er FX World Championships		Spain	Female / FX	Odile van Aanholt (NED) & Annette Duetz (NED)			
3–10 January	420 World Championships	Iate Clube do Rio de Janeiro	Brazil	Male / Mixed	Lucas Cocchi Kubelka De Freitas (BRA) & Victoria Back (BRA)	78	14	
3–10 January	420 World Championships	Iate Clube do Rio de Janeiro	Brazil	Female	Iakovina Kerkezou (GRE); Danai Giannouli (GRE)	27	10	
Jul 6-13	470 Junior World Championships			Mixed	Matisse Pacaud (FRA); Lucie de Gennes (FRA)			
Feb 24 –Mar 3	470 World Championships		Spain	Mixed	Jordi Xammar (ESP) & Nora Brugman (ESP)			
Aug 1-10	505 World Championship	Varberg Segelsalskap	Sweden	Open	Peter Nicholas (AUS); Luke Payne (AUS)	95	14	
Aug 1-9	Cadet World Championship	Mount Batten Watersports & Activities Centre	United Kingdom	Open	Josh Garner (AUS); Jack Benyan (AUS)	65	10	
Feb 5–16	Fireball World Championship	Royal Geelong Yacht Club	Australia	Open	(United Kingdom) Thomas Gillard & (United Kingdom) Andy Thompson			
Mar 23–31	Flying Dutchman World Championship		United States	Open	Kay-Uwe Lüdtke; Kai Schäfers			
Jul 19-28	Flying Junior World Championship	Travemünder Woche		Open	Hylke SASSE; Doete VOGELAAR	42		
Aug 10 -Sep 16	GP14 World Championship	Welsh National Sailing Academy	United Kingdom	Open	Matt Mee (GBR); Chris Robinson (GBR)	85		
	International 14 World Championships		Italy	Open	Andy Shaw (GBR); Rob Struckett (GBR)			
	International 14 World Championships		Italy	Team				
Jul 23-27	Youth Lightning World Championship	Cofradía Naútica del Pacífico	Chile	Open	Alec Hughes (PER); Sergio Gutarra (PER); Sofia Ruales (PER)	20	9	
Aug 5-9	RS500 World Championship			Open	Pim van Vugt (NED); Lisa van Vugt (NED)			
Jul 29-Aug 2	RS Feva World Championship	Jeugdcommissie regio Deltawateren	Netherlands	Open	Ben Greenhalgh (GBR); Tom Sinfield (GBR)	173	18	
Oct 24 -Nov 2	Open Snipe World Championship	Yacht Club Argentino	Argentina	Open	Juliana Duque (BRA); Bruna Patricio (BRA)	84	12	
Jan 2–9	Tasar World Championship	Sandringham Yacht Club	Australia	Open	Jonathan McKee (USA); Libby McKee (USA)	102	7	
Jul 13-19	Vaurien World Championship	Yacht Club Limar	Slovenia	Open	Francesco Graziani (ITA); Marta Delli (ITA)	54	10	
World Sailing Class - Keelboats
29 Jul -3 Aug	2.4 Metre World Championship	Kieler Yacht-Club	Germany	Open	Heiko Kröger (GER)	84	16	
Sep 2-6	5.5 Metre World Championship	Yacht Club de l'Odet	France	Open	John Bacon (AUS); Joost Houwling (NED); Ed Wright (GBR)	29	12	
Jun 16-23	12mR World Championship	Yacht Club de Porquerolles						
March 15–22	Etchells World Championship	Fremantle Sailing Club	Australia	Open	Graeme Taylor (AUS); James Mayo (AUS); Richard Allanson (AUS)			
Oct 19-26	J/22 World Championship	Eastport Yacht Club	United States	Open	Travis Odenbach (USA); Geoff Becker (USA); Justin Damore (USA)	48		
Sep 28 -Oct 5	J/24 World Championship	Corinthian Yacht Club of Seattle	Canada	Open	Keith Whittemore (USA); Mélanie Edwards (USA); Brian Thomas (USA); Marianne Schoke (SWE); Willem Van Waay (USA)	68	16	
June 4–8	Corinthian J/70 World Championship	Royal Danish Yacht Club	Denmark	Open	Alberto Guarischi (BRA); Antonio Moreira (BRA); Pedro AmaralL (BRA); Felipe Rondina (BRA)	109	19	
Sep 14-21	J/70 World Championship	Real Club Náutico de Palma	Spain	Open	Douglas Newhouse (USA); Jeremy Wilmot (USA); Ted Hackney (USA); George Peet (USA)	95	32+	
Jul 6-13	J/80 World Championship	Societe des Regates Rochelaises	France	Open	Javier Padron Torrent (ESP); Jon Larrazabal Lallana (ESP); Alberto Padron Torrent (ESP); Daniel De La Pedraja (ESP); Alba Ponce (ESP)	70	8	
Aug 24-31	Micro Class World Championship	C V BORDEAUX C M	France	Open				
Aug 17-24	Melges 24 World Championship	San Francisco Yacht Club	United States	Open	Donald Wilson (USA); Jeremy Wilmot (AUS); Edward Hackney (AUS); Tomas Dietrich (ARG); Ian Liberty (USA)	31	18	
23-29 Sep 2024	Platu 25 World Championship	Nautical Club 78	Greece	Open	Francesco Lanera (ITA)			
Aug 21-25	RC44 World Championship		Australia	Open	Vladimir Prosikhin (BUL); Nic Asher (GBR); James Baxter (NZL); Pierluigi De Felice (ITA); Harry Hall (AUS); Pietro Mantovani (ITA); Taavi Taveter (EST); Federica Salva (ITA); Jeremy Lomas (NZL)	9	17	
Sep 24-28	RS21 World Championship	Club Nautic L'Escala	Spain	Open	Pietro Negri (ITA); Niccolo Bianchi (ITA); Giovanni Meloni (ITA); Camilla Cordero Di Montezemolo (ITA)			
Sep 29 -Oct 4	RS Venture Connect World Championship	Rutland Sailing Club	United Kingdom					
Feb 11–16	SB20 World Championship		United Arab Emirates	Open	Artem Basalkin (UAE); Pippa Wilson (GBR); Gonçalo Lopes (UAE)			
24-30 Jun	Soling World Championship	Hankø Yacht Club	Norway	Open	Farkas Litkey (HUN); Károly Vezér (HUN); Kristóf Wossala (HUN)	27	13+	
Sep 7-13	Shark 24 World Championship	Whitby Yacht Club, Ontario	Canada	Open				
Sep 9-15	Sonar World Championship	Noroton Yacht Club	United States	Open	Morgan Connor (USA); Jan Raymond (USA); Wells Connor (USA); Andrew Buttner (USA)	31	3	
Sep 8-13	Star World Championship	San Diego Yacht Club	United States	Open	John Kostecki (USA); Austin Sperry (USA)	64		
Sep 1-6	Tempest World Championship	Regattaverein Brunnen	Switzerland	Open	Lars Bähr (GER); Leif Bähr (GER)	36	6	
May 18-25	Yngling World Championship	Union Yacht Club Traunsee	Austria	Open	Wolfgang Buchinger (AUT); Michael Nake (AUT); Karin Schöberl (AUT)	48	7	
World Sailing Class - Yachts
Sep 30 -Oct 5	L30 Class World Championship	Balatonfüredi Yacht Club	Hungary	Open	Péter Dr. Tenke; Martin Dr. Tenke; Marcell Goszleth; Levente Takácsy; Szörényi Ádám	15		
Jul 15-20	TP52 World Championship	New York Yacht Club, Newport	United States	Open	Guillermo Parada (ARG); Tony Langley (GBR); Bruno Zirilli (ITA); Chris Hosking (AUS); Andrew Estcourt (NZL); Jeoff Povey (GBR); Carlo Huisman (NED); Francesco Scalici (ITA); Simon Fry (GBR); Joey Newton (AUS); David Vera (ESP); Bradley Mclaughlin (GBR); Matt Cornwell (GBR)	10	22	
World Sailing Class - Multihulls
Sep 10-15	A-Cat World Championship		Italy	Foiling	Jakub Surowiec (POL)	82	16	
Sep 10-15	A-Cat World Championship		Italy	Classic	Gustavo Doreste Blanco (ESP)	86	15	
Jun 26-30	A's Youth Foil World Championship							
Sep 6-13	Dart 18 World Championship		Italy	Open	Andrea Tramutola (ITA); Marco Tramutola (ITA)	88	8	
Jul 21-26	Formula 16 World Championship	Aval Associazione Velica Alto Lario	Italy	Open	Emma Rankin (AUS); Beau White (AUS)	51	10	
Jun 28 -Jul 5	Formula 18 World Championship	Club De Vela Ballena Alegre	Spain	Open	Pablo Völker (ESP); Federico Polimeni (ESP)			
Jul 12-19	Tornado World Championship	Club Nautico Rimini	Italy	Open	Angelika Kohlendorfer (AUT); Calvin Claus (AUT)	29	10	
Sep 2-8	M32 World Championship							
Oct 27 -Nov 3	Nacra 15 World Championship		Spain	Open	Mateo LECLERCQ (BEL); Mathieu PINSART (BEL)	80		
16-21 Jul	Nacra 17 Junior World Championships							
7-12 May	Nacra 17 World Championship		France	Open	Ruggero Tita (ITA); Caterina Banti (ITA)	44	20	
World Sailing Class - Boards
Jul 1-7	Formula Kite Youth World Championships							
11-19 May	Formula Kite World Championships							
17-22 Jun	Formula Windsurfing Foil World Championships							
10-14 Jul	IFCA Foiling Slalom Open World Championship							
Jan 26 –Feb 3	iQFoil World Championships		Spain	Male	Nicolò Renna (ITA)			
Jan 26 –Feb 3	iQFoil World Championships		Spain	Female	Sharon Kantor (ISR)			
18-25 Aug	U23 iQFOiL World Championships							
27 Dec 2023 – 3 Jan	2024 IWCA World Championship	Royal Freshwater Bay Yacht Club	Australia	Female	Lars Kleppich (AUS)			
27 Dec 2023 – 3 Jan	2024 IWCA World Championship	Royal Freshwater Bay Yacht Club	Australia	Female	Lanee Beashel (USA)			
Sep 7-15	IFCA Grand Slam Slalom World Champions							
Oct 13-19	ISCA World Championship	Rush Creek Yacht Club	United States					
Sep 16-22	IWCA World Championships	CV Ballena Alegre	Spain					
Jun 26-30	KiteFoil Masters World Championships							
16-21 Sep 2024	Raceboard World Championships							
21–30 Apr	Speed Windsurfing World Championship		France					
21-28 Jul	Techno 293 World Championships	Spartacus Sailing Club	Hungary	+ Male	Yugo Saito (JPN)	38	11	
21-28 Jul	Techno 293 World Championships	Spartacus Sailing Club	Hungary	+ Female	Teresa Medde (ITA)	38	11	
21-28 Jul	Techno 293 World Championships	Spartacus Sailing Club	Hungary	U17 Male	Panagiotis Ioannou (GRE)	58	12	
21-28 Jul	Techno 293 World Championships	Spartacus Sailing Club	Hungary	U17 Female	Danai Anagnostou (GRE)	38	13	
21-28 Jul	Techno 293 World Championships	Spartacus Sailing Club	Hungary	U15 Male	Evangelos Kyriazakos (GRE)	58	13	
21-28 Jul	Techno 293 World Championships	Spartacus Sailing Club	Hungary	U15 Female	Olivia Sánchez (ESP)	42	12	
21-28 Jul	Techno 293 World Championships	Spartacus Sailing Club	Hungary	U13 Open		72	11	
