= 2022 in sailing =

2022 in sailing describes the year's events in sailing

== Death of Notable Sailor ==
- Jeremy Rogers MBE (1937–2022) - Yacht Designer

== Major Offshore Sailing ==
- Rolex 2022 Sydney to Hobart Yacht Race
- Sevenstar RORC Round Britain and Ireland Race
- Rolex Middle Sea Race
- Both the middle sea race and Sydney Hobart were decided by the jury.

== Major Oceanic Races ==
- 2022 Route du Rhum

== World Championships (Incomplete) ==
Start date	Event title	Venue	Country	Class	Discipline	Gender	Other	Winner/s	Ref.
World Sailing - Events
World Sailing Authorised
2022	One Metre World Championship		Croatia	One Metre	Fleet	Open		Olivier Cohen (FRA)	
World Sailing - Single Person Dinghy
2022	Finn World Championship (Gold Cup)			Finn (dinghy)	Fleet	Open			
2022	Finn Youth World Championship (Silver Cup)			Finn (dinghy)	Fleet	Open	Under 24?		
2022	Finn Master World Championship			Finn (dinghy)	Fleet	Open	Over 35?		
2022	ILCA 4 World Championships								
2022	ILCA 6 Female World Championship								
2022	ILCA 7 World Championship								
2022	ILCA Masters World Championships								
2022	Moth World Championship			Moth (dinghy)	Fleet	Open			
2022	Musto Skiff World Championship	Keil	GER	Musto Skiff	Fleet	Open		Rick Peacock (GBR)	
2022-06-24	RS Aero World Championships		United States	RS Aero	Fleet	Open	5 Rig	Dieter Creitz (USA)	
2022-06-24	RS Aero World Championships		United States	RS Aero	Fleet	Open	7 Rig	Dalton Bergan (USA)	
2022-06-24	RS Aero World Championships		United States	RS Aero	Fleet	Open	9 Rig	Dan Falk (USA)	
2022	Optimist World Championships			Optimist (dinghy)	Fleet	Open			
2022	Optimist World Championships			Optimist (dinghy)	Team	Open	Nationality		
2022	RS Tera World Championships	Weymouth	United Kingdom	RS Tera	Fleet	Open	Pro Rig	Archie Munro-Price (GBR)	
2022	RS Tera World Championships	Weymouth	United Kingdom	RS Tera	Fleet	Open	Sport Rig	Ruta Mažunaviciute (LTU)	
2022	Sunfish World Championship								
2022	Topper World Championships								
2022	Zoom 8 World Championships								
World Sailing - Two Person Dinghy
2022	29er World Championship			29er (dinghy)	Fleet	Open			
2022	49er World Championship			49er (dinghy)	Fleet	Open			
2022	49er World Championship			49erFX (dinghy)	Fleet	Female			
2022-08-05	420 World Championships	Lake Balaton	HUN	420 (dinghy)	Fleet	Open	Under 17	Severin Gericke (GER); Xaver Schwarz (GER)	
2022-08-05	420 World Championships	Lake Balaton	HUN	420 (dinghy)	Fleet	Male & Mixed		Fernando FLETHES ANAYA (ESP); Carlos FLETHES ANAYA (ESP)	
2022-08-05	420 World Championships	Lake Balaton	HUN	420 (dinghy)	Fleet	Female		Solenza MARIANI (FRA); Antea MARIANI (FRA)	
2022	470 World Championship			470 (dinghy)	Fleet	Mixed			
2022	505 World Championship	Cork	IRL	505 (dinghy)	Fleet	Open		Stuart McNay (USA); Caleb Paine (USA)	
2022	Cadet World Championship			Cadet (dinghy)	Fleet	Open			
2022	GP14 World Championship			GP14	Fleet	Open		Ian Dobson; Andy Tunnicliffe	
2022-07-21	RS Feva World Championship			RS Feva	Fleet	Open		Simon Cooke (NZL); Arthur Rebbeck (NZL)	
World Sailing - Keelboats
2022	2.4m World Championship		United States	2.4 Metre	Fleet	Open		Dee Smith (USA)	
2022	5.5 Metre World Championship	Hanko	Norway	5.5 Metre	Fleet	Open		Elliot Hanson (USA); Andrew Palfrey (AUS); Sam Haines (AUS)	
2022	6 Metre World Championship	Sanxenxo	Spain	6 Metre	Fleet	Open	Modern	SUI 142 - MOMO Dieter Schoen (SUI); Markus Wieser (GER); Dirk de Ridder (NED); Ross Halcrow (NZL); Victor Manuel Mariño Prieto	
2022	6 Metre World Championship	Sanxenxo	Spain	6 Metre	Fleet	Open	Classic	FRA 111 - DIX AOÛT Louis Heckly; Loïc Le Garrec; Bill Hugues Leclerc; Frédéric Baratay; Jonas Lambelet; Bernard Divorne	
2022	8 Metre World Championship	Geneva	SUI	8 Metre	Fleet	Open			
2022	Dragon World Championship	Kühlungsborn	GER	Dragon	Fleet	Open		Klaus Diederichs; Jamie Lea; Diego Negri	
2022	Etchells World Championships			Etchells	Fleet	Open			
2022	J/22 World Championship			J/22	Fleet	Open			
2022	J/24 World Championship			J/24	Fleet	Open			
2022	J/70 World Championship			J/70	Fleet	Open			
2022	J/80 World Championship			J/80	Fleet	Open			
2022	Star Class World Championship			Star (keelboat)	Fleet	Open	Over 35?	Diego Negri (ITA); Sergio Lambertenghi (ITA)	
World Sailing - Yacht
2022	Swan One Design World Championship	Valencia	Spain	Swan 45	Fleet	Open	Classification		
2022	Swan One Design World Championship	Valencia	Spain	ClubSwan 50	Fleet	Open	Classification		
2022	TP52 World Championship			TP52	Fleet	Open			
World Sailing - Multihull
2022	Nacra 15 World Championship			Nacra 15	Fleet	Open			
2022	Tornado World Championship		France	Tornado	Fleet	Open		Konstantinos TRIGONIS GRE; Konstantinos KAZANTZIS GRE	
World Sailing - Boards
2022	IKA World Championship			Kite	Fleet	Open			
