= 2011 Extreme Sailing Series =

Event title
- Edition: 5th
- Dates: 22 February–11 December 2011
- Yachts: Extreme 40

Competitors
- Competitors: 11

Results
- Winner: (Italy) Luna Rossa

The 2011 Extreme Sailing Series is the fifth edition of the sailing series. This is the second year without the original sponsor iShares. The 2011 series started in Muscat, Oman on 22 February 2011 and ended in Almeria, Spain on 11 December 2011 and took place in 9 cities around the world.

== Acts ==
Ports visited

=== Act 1: Muscat, Oman ===
The first act of the series was held in Muscat, Oman between 22 and 24 February 2011.

=== Act 2: Qingdao, China ===
Qingdao, China was the second act for the 2011 series, and was held on 15–17 April 2011.

=== Act 3: Istanbul, Turkey ===
Istanbul, Turkey was the host of the third act of the 2011 series, on the weekend of 27–29 May 2011.

=== Act 4: Boston, USA ===
The fourth act of 2011 was in Boston, United States and was held between 30 June - 4 July 2011.

=== Act 5: Cowes, UK ===
The second act of the series was held again in Cowes, UK. The birthplace to the America's Cup, this act was held during Cowes Week between 6–12 August 2011.

=== Act 6: Trapani, Italy ===
Trapani, Italy was the sixth act this year, held between 16 and 18 September 2011.

=== Act 7: Nice, France ===
Between 30 September and 2 October 2011, Nice, France hosted the seventh act of the series.

=== Act 8: Almeria, Spain ===
Almeria, Spain was the host for the penultimate act of the 2011 series, being held on 12–16 October 2011.

=== Act 9: Singapore ===
Singapore was the final act in 2011, and was held on 9–11 December 2011.

== Teams ==
The teams included:

=== Alinghi ===
Tanguy Cariou, Yann Guichard, Nils Frei and Yves Detrey.

=== Artemis Racing ===
Terry Hutchinson, Santiago Lange, Sean Clarkson, Rodney Ardern, Morgan Trubovich, Julien Cressant and Andy Fethers.

=== Emirates Team New Zealand ===
Dean Barker, Adam Beashel, Chris Ward, Andy McLean, Glenn Ashby, James Dagg, Jeremy Lomas and Richard Meacham.

=== Groupe Edmond de Rothschild ===
Pierre Pennec, Christophe Espagnon, Thierry Fouchier and Hervé Cunningham.

=== Luna Rossa ===
Max Sirena, Paul Campbell-James, Alister Richardson and Manuel Modena.

=== Niceforyou ===
Alberto Barovier, Alberto Sonino, Mark Bulkeley, Daniele De Luca and Simone de Mari.

=== Oman Air ===
Sidney Gavignet, Kinley Fowler, David Carr and Nasser Al Mashari.

=== Red Bull Extreme Sailing ===
Roman Hagara, Hans-Peter Steinacher, Will Howden and Craig Monk.

=== Team Extreme ===
Roland Gäbler, Bruno Dubois, Sebbe Godefroid, Nicholas Heintz, Michael Walther and William Wu.

=== Team GAC Pindar ===
Ian Williams, Brad Webb, Mark Ivey, Mischa Heemskerk, Gilberto Nobili and Jono Macbeth.

=== The Wave, Muscat ===
Torvar Mirsky, Kyle Langford, Nick Hutton and Khamis Al Anbouri.

== Results ==
Rank	Team	Act 1	Act 2	Act 3	Act 4	Act 5	Act 6	Act 7	Act 8	Act 9	Overall points
1	(Italy) Luna Rossa	5	1	5	4	2	4	4	2	1	69
2	(France) Groupe Edmond de Rothschild	1	3	3	5	8	2	1	5	7	68
3	Emirates Team New Zealand	4	2	2	1	7	7	7	6	2	60
4	(Switzerland) Alinghi	6	5	7	6	3	6	3	1	5	59
5	(Oman) The Wave, Muscat	7	7	4	3	1	1	9	7	3	57
6	(Austria) Red Bull Sailing Team	3	4	6	7	4	5	6	8	4	53
7	(Sweden) Artemis Racing	2	6	1	2	11	11	2	DNF	DNF	48
8	Oman Air	8	9	8	8	5	3	5	3	6	47
9	(United Kingdom) Team GAC Pindar	11	11	9	10	6	8	8	4	8	29
10	(Italy) Niceforyou	10	10	10	9	9	9	11	11	DNF	18
11	(European Union) Team Extreme	9	8	11	11	10	10	10	10	9	18

DNF = Did not finish
