= J/70 World Championship =

World Championship in the J/70 Class

The J/70 World Championship, Corithian J/70 World Championship and the Mixed J/70 World Championship are annual international sailing regatta for J/70 keelboat, they are organized by the host club on behalf of the International J/70 Class Association and recognized by World Sailing, the sports IOC recognized governing body.

== Open Worlds ==
Host cities of the J/70 World Championship

Event			Host			Boats	Sailor					Ref.
Ed.	Date	Year	Host club	City	Country	Boats	No.			Nat.	Cont.	Ref.
1	8–13 September	2014	New York Yacht Club	Newport	United States	86	344	296	48	19	5	
2	06–11 July	2015	Société des Régates Rochelaises	La Rochelle	France	78	309			24+	5+	
3	27 Sept. – 1 Oct.	2016	St. Francis Yacht Club	San Francisco	United States	68	272	260	12	22	6	
4	12–19 September	2017	Yacht Club Costa Smeralda	Porto Cervo	Italy	161	700			25+	4+	
5	22–29 September	2018	Eastern Yacht Club	Marblehead	United States	91	385			24+	5+	
6	30 Aug. – 6 Sep.	2019	Royal Torbay Yacht Club	Torbay	United Kingdom	77	337			20	4	
N/A	25 Jul. – 1 Aug.	2020	California Yacht Club	Los Angeles	United States	POSTPONED DUE TO COVID-19						
7	7–15 August	2021	California Yacht Club	Marina del Rey	United States	61	249	229	20	16	4	
8	14–22 October	2022	Yacht Club de Monaco	Monaco	Monaco	89	378	342	36	28	4	
9	31 Oct. – 4 Nov.	2023	St. Petersburg Yacht Club	St. Petersburg	United States	83	340	318	22	21	4	
10	17–21 September	2024	Real Club Náutico de Palma	Palma de Mallorca	Spain	95	401			32+	4+	
11	24 Oct – 1 Nov	2025	Yacht Club Argentino	Buenos Aires	Argentina	71	303	273	30	18	5	
12	8–12 September	2026	Clube Naval de Cascais	Cascais	Portugal	100	439	404	35	32	5	

== Corinthian Worlds ==
Host cities of the J/70 World Championship

Event			Host			Boats	Sailor					Ref.
Ed.	Date	Year	Host club	City	Country	Boats	No.			Nat.	Cont.	Ref.
1	4–8 June	2024	Royal Danish Yacht Club	Copenhagen	Denmark	109	459	382	77	19	4	
2	22-28 Sep	2025	Eastern Yacht Club, Marblehead	Marblehead, Massachusetts	United States	29	123	108	15	9	4	
3	23-30 May	2026	Club La Pelle & Union Nautique Marseillaise	Marseille	France	88	383	317	66	23	4	

== Mixed Worlds ==
Host cities of the J/70 World Championship

Event			Host			Boats	Sailor					Ref.
Ed.	Date	Year	Host club	City	Country	Boats	No.			Nat.	Cont.	Ref.
1	26–29 June	2025	Circolo Vela Torbole	Lake Garda	Italy	47	222	93	129	24	5	
2	Aug.	2026	Royal Danish Yacht Club	Skovshoved	Denmark	38	178	72	106	14	3	

== Multiple World Champions ==
Compiled from the data below the table includes up to and including 2025.

Ranking	Sailor	Gold	Silver	Bronze	Total	No. Entries*	Ref.
1	Victor Diaz De Leon (USA)	2	2	2	6	10	
2	Willem Van Waay (USA)	2	1	1	4	10	
3	Peter Duncan (USA)	2	0	1	3	9	
3	Judson Smith (USA)	2	0	1	3	7	
5	Edward Hackney (AUS)	2	0	0	2	4	
5	Bradley Rodi (USA)	2	0	0	2	4	
5	Charles Pucciariello (USA)	2	0	0	2	4	
5	Alec Cutler (BER)	2	0	0	2	4	

== Open Worlds Medalists ==
year	Gold	Silver	Bronze	Ref.
2014 Newport; United States; 86 Boats	USA 2 - Helly Hansen (2); Timothy Healy (USA); Paul Abdullah (USA); Geoff Becker (USA); Gordon Borges (USA)	USA 187 - Catapult (87); Joel Ronning (USA); Victor Diaz de Leon (USA); Bill Hardesty (USA); Willem Van Waay (USA)	USA 96 - Savasana (96); Brian Keane (USA); Richard Clarke (CAN); Anthony Kotoun (ISV); Ron Weed (USA)	
2015 La Rochelle; France; 78 Boats	MEX 384 - FLOJITO Y COOPERANDO; Julian Fernandez Neckelman (MEX); Erik Brockmann (MEX); Bill Hardesty (USA); Willem Van Waay (USA)	ITA 456 - CALVI; Carlo Alberini (ITA); Sergio Blosi (ITA); Branko Brcin (SLO); Karlo Hmeljak (SLO)	USA 2 - HELLY HANSEN; Tim Healy (USA); John Mollicone (USA); Gordon Borges (USA); Geoff Becker (USA)	
2016 San Francisco; United States; 68 Boats	USA 187 - Catapult #28; Joel Ronning (USA); John Kostecki (USA); Christopher Stocke (USA); Patrick Wilson (USA)	MEX 384 - Flojito y Cooperando #14; Julian Fernandez Neckelman (MEX); Bill Hardesty (USA); Willem Van Waay (USA); Danel Belausteguigottia Fierro (MEX)	USA 179 - Africa #41; Judson Smith (USA); Alec Anderson (IVB); Victor Diaz De Leon (USA); Ed Wright (GBR)	
2017 Porto Cervo; Italy; 161 Boats	USA49 - RELATIVE OBSCURITY; Peter Duncan (USA); Victor Diaz De Leon (USA); Willem Van Waay (USA); Jud Smith (USA)	USA96 - SAVASANA; Brian Keane (USA); Stuart McNay (USA); Thomas Barrows III (USA); Ron Weed (USA)	ITA72 - NOTARO TEAM; Luca Domenici (ITA); Diego Negri (ITA); Stefano Orlandi (ITA); Piero Vigo (ITA); Francesca Di Gangi (ITA)	
2018 Marblehead; United States; 91 Boats	USA 1310 - Africa (310); Judson Smith (USA); Lucas Calabrese (ARG) William Felder (USA); Marc Gauthier (USA)	USA 839 - Stampede (839); Bruno PASQUINELLI (USA); Maxwell Skelley (USA); Eric Doyle (USA); Nathan Wilmot (AUS)	USA 3 - 3 Ball JT (3) Jack Franco (USA); Bill Hardesty (USA); Lior Lavie (ISR); Allan Terhune Jnr. (USA)	
2019 Torquay; Great Britain; 77 Boats	GBR 1451 - Eat Sleep J Repeat; Paul Ward (GBR); Charlie Cumbley (GBR); Ruairidh Scott (GBR); Mario Trindade (BRA)	USA 180 - Catapult; Joel Ronning (USA); Victor Diaz De Leon (USA); Christopher Stocke (USA); Patrick Wilson (USA)	ESP 961 - Noticia; José María Torcida (ESP); Luis Martín Cabiedes (ESP); Rayco Tabares (ESP); Pablo Santurde (ESP); Robin Imaz (ESP)	
2021 Marina del Rey; United States; 61 Boats	USA 1311 - Relative Obscurity; Peter Duncan (USA); Willem Van Waay (USA); Morgan Trubovich (NZL); Victor Diaz de Leon (USA)	USA 26 - Midlife Crisis; Bruce Golison (USA); Steve Hunt (USA); Erik Shampain (USA); Jeff Reynolds (USA)	USA 819 - Dark Energy; Laura Grondin (USA); Taylor Canfield (ISV); Michael Buckley (USA); Scott Ewing (USA)	
2022 Monaco; Monaco; 90 Boats	SUI 1470 - Decouvertes-GeoMod; Kilian Wagen (SUI); Gregoire Siegwart (SUI); Luke Patience (GBR); David Hughes (USA); Celia Willison (NZL)	MON 1277 - Leonteq; Pierrik Devic (FRA); François Brenac (FRA); Stéphane Christidis (FRA); Axelle Foucaud (FRA); Martin Lemarchand (FRA)	USA 833 - Relative Obscurity; Peter S. Duncan (USA); Willem Van Waay (USA); Morgan Trubovich (USA); Victor Diaz de Leon (USA)	
2023 St. Petersburg; United States; 83 Boats	GBR 1123 - Brutus III; Chris Grube (GBR); Tom Mallindine (GBR); Ben Saxton (GBR); Charles Thompson (GBR); Elisabeth Whitener (USA)	USA 26 - Midlife Crisis; Bruce Golison (USA); Steve Hunt (USA); Jeff Reynolds (USA); Erik Shampain (USA)	USA 819 - Dark Energy; Taylor Canfield (VIR); Scott Ewing (USA); Laura Grondin (USA); Ian Liberty (USA)	
2024 Mallorca; Spain; 95 Boats	USA 340 - Yonder; Douglas Newhouse (USA); Jeremy Wilmot (USA); Ted Hackney (USA); George Peet (USA)	BRA 1226 - Mindset; Ralph Vasconcellos (BRA); Júlio Carvalho (BRA); Guilherme Hamelmann (USA); Gonçalo Ribeiro (USA)	GBR 1572 - Brutus II; Tom Mallindine (GBR); Charles Thompson (GBR); Chris Grube (GBR); Ben Saxton (GBR); Elisabeth Whitener (USA)	
2025; Argentina; 95 Boats	USA-819 - Dark Energy (90); Laura Grondin (USA); Taylor Canfield (ISV); Ian Liberty (USA); Edward Hackney (AUS)	ARG-1555 - Nildo (45); Guillermo Parada (ARG); Mariano Parada (ARG); Jorge Emilio Engelhard (ARG); Juan Pablo Engelhard (ARG)	BRA-1872 - Aretê (80); Bruno Bethlem (BRA); Rafael Martins (BRA); Pedro Tinoco (BRA); Alberto Vita (BRA)	
2026; Portugal; 100 Boats	BRA-641 - Oceanpact - Viking; Haroldo Solberg (BRA); Mário Tinoco (BRA); Gabriel Silva (BRA); Carlos Robles (BRA)	ESP-1283 - Marnatura; Luis Bugallo (ESP); Enrique Freire (ESP); Yago Osuna (ESP); Alfonso Crespo (ESP); Ignacio Albo (ESP)	USA-169 - Empeiria; John Heaton (CAN); Gonçalo Ribeiro (POR); Paulo Manso (POR); Mark Spearman (AUS)	

== Corinthian World Medalists ==
year	Gold	Silver	Bronze	Ref.
2024 (DEN)	BRA 709 - THREE MUSKETEERS (110); Alberto Guarischi (BRA); Antonio Moreira (BRA); Pedro Amaral (BRA); Felipe Rondina (BRA)	GBR 1572 - Boat Name: Brutus II (115); Ian Dobson (GBR); Charles Thompson (GBR); Oliver Wells (GBR); Simon Potts (GBR); Margarida Lopes (POR)	EST 1796 - Lenny (199); Tõnu Tõniste (EST); Toomas Tõniste (EST); Andres Viisemann (EST); Marko Lilienthal (EST); Maiki Saaring (EST)	
2025 (USA)	USA-819 - Dark Energy (90); Laura Grondin (USA); Taylor Canfield (ISV); Ian Liberty (USA); Edward Hackney (AUS)	ARG-1555 - Nildo (45); Guillermo Parada (ARG); Mariano Parada (ARG); Jorge Emilio Engelhard (ARG); Juan Pablo Engelhard (ARG)	BRA-1872 - Aretê (80); Bruno Bethlem (BRA); Rafael Martins (BRA); Pedro Tinoco (BRA); Alberto Vita (BRA)	
2026 (FRA)	BER-1328; Alec Cutler (BER); Charles Pucciariello (USA); Keith Davids (BER); Bradley Rodi (USA)	AUS-725; Sam Haynes (AUS); Tom Grimes (AUS); Hannah Petertil (USA); Adam Brenz-Verca (AUS)	EST-1796; Tonu Toniste (EST); Toomas Toniste (EST); Marko Lilienthal (EST); Maiki Saaring (EST); Henri Tauts (EST)	

== Mixed World Medalists ==
year	Gold	Silver	Bronze	Ref.
2025 (ITA)	ESP-1170 - Yupi (851); Joan Cardona Méndez (ESP); Gerardo Prego Menor (ESP); Cristina Pujol Bajo (ESP); Fátima Diz Barreras (ESP); Pilar Amaro Filgueira (ESP)	AUS-1451 - Vamos (832); Tim Ryan (AUS); Jessica Grimes (AUS); Laura Van Veen (NED); Robert Greenhalgh (GBR)	SWE-625 - Sailracing (866); Anton Dahlberg (SWE); Pär Svärdson (SWE); Emilia Svardson (SWE); Lovisa Karlsson (SWE); Johanna Sommarlund (SWE)	
2026 (DEN)	ESP-1170 - YUPI; Joan Cardona Mendez (ESP); Gerardo Prego Menor (ESP); Pilar Fernanda Amaro Filgueira (ESP); Fatima Diz Barreras (ESP)	DEN-1343 / Soffe; Kim Christensen (DEN); Gustav Schwennesen (DEN); Silje Cerup-Simonsen (DEN); Rebekka Johannesen (DEN)	USA-1474 / Callisto; James Murray (USA); Ian Barrows (USA); Isabel Dickson (USA); Catherine Dickson (USA)	
