= Josh Belsky =

American sailor (born 1966)

Josh Belsky is an American sailor who has competed in multiple America's Cups.

Joshua, born June 1966 is from Rye, New York, and he studied at St. Lawrence University. He was a pitman on board America^{3} when it defended the 1992 America's Cup.

Belsky sailed with Team Dennis Conner when they lost the 1995 America's Cup.

He then was on board EF Language when they won the 1997–98 Whitbread Round the World Race. EF Language was skippered by Paul Cayard who Belsky then joined in AmericaOne Challenge for the 2000 Louis Vuitton Cup.

Belsky, currently president of JB sailing, later joined Alinghi and he sailed with them when they won the 2003 America's Cup and successfully defended the 2007 America's Cup.
