= Brad Webb =

New Zealand sailor

Brad Webb is a New Zealand sailor who has competed in multiple America's Cups.

Growing up in Wellington, Webb was a member of the Muritai Yacht Club where he sailed P-class sailing dinghies. Webb sailed with Tag Heuer Challenge in the 1995 Louis Vuitton Cup and with America True in the 2000 Louis Vuitton Cup.

Webb joined Oracle Racing when it was founded in November 2000 and sailed in their 2003 and 2007 Louis Vuitton Cup campaigns.

He was the bowman on USA 17 when it won the 2010 America's Cup.

He joined GAC Pindar for the 2011 Extreme Sailing Series before re-joining Oracle Racing as a back up crew member for the 2013 America's Cup.

Webb and his wife own a company, ACsailingSF, that sails USA 76 in San Francisco.
