= 2007 America's Cup =

Sailing event

32nd America's Cup
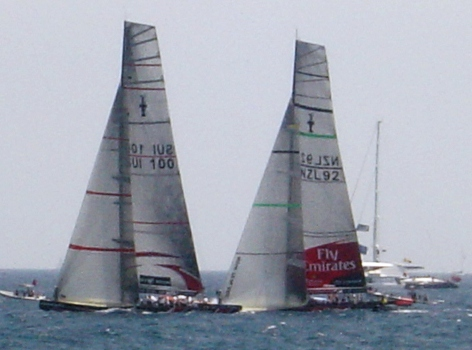
- Alinghi (left) and Emirates Team New Zealand (right) in race one

Defender Switzerland
- Defender club: Société Nautique de Genève
- Yacht: SUI-100

Challenger New Zealand
- Challenger club: Royal New Zealand Yacht Squadron
- Yacht: NZL-92

Competition
- Location: Port America's Cup, Valencia, Spain
- 39°28′N 0°18.5′W
- Dates: 25 April – 3 July 2007
- Rule: International America's Cup Class
- Winner: Société Nautique de Genève
- Score: 5–2

The 2007 America's Cup was the thirty-second challenge for the America's Cup and was won by Alinghi in the 7th race. The Cup is the most famous and most prestigious regatta and Match Race in the sport of sailing.

As per the Deed of Gift of the America's Cup the yacht club that holds the Cup is the one that chooses the location for the next challenge to take place. Alinghi, the syndicate representing the Société Nautique de Genève, the winners of the thirty-first edition, are based in Switzerland which is a landlocked country, so Alinghi put the hosting rights out to a competitive bid process. During a preliminary selection the bids of Barcelona, Palma de Mallorca, Porto Cervo and Elba were eliminated. The four finalists were Cascais (near Lisbon), Marseille, Naples (ITA) and Valencia. On November 27, 2003, it was announced that the venue would be Valencia, Spain. A new building, Veles e Vents designed by David Chipperfield, was built in the harbour of Valencia to house the central base for all the America's Cup teams.

By winning the 32nd America's Cup, Alinghi changed what seemed to have become a tradition: that the winner of race three goes on to win the match. Emirates Team New Zealand, despite winning the third heat, was not able to capture the Cup. The score of the 32nd America's Cup has also differentiated the match from previous editions. The past three America's Cups – 1995, 2000 and 2003 – were all sweeps.

Eleven challengers from nine countries submitted formal entries prior to the closing deadline of April 29, 2005.

== Challenger selection - Louis Vuitton Cup 2007 ==
In preparation for the 2007 America's Cup, there were a series of regattas leading up to the Cup races, called "Acts" which culminated in the 2007 Louis Vuitton Cup. The winner, Emirates Team New Zealand, became the Challenger and raced against the Defender, Alinghi, for the America's Cup.

In 2004, there were three acts, Act 1 held September 2004 in Marseille, France; Act 2 held October 2004 in Valencia, Spain; and Act 3 held October 2004, also in Valencia. These events featured fleet and match racing between America's Cup class yachts representing the syndicates that were vying for selection as challenger for the America's Cup in 2007. Points were awarded for each Act, and the team with the highest score at the end of the year is declared the ACC (America's Cup Class) Champion for that year. In 2004, Emirates Team New Zealand narrowly won over second place American challenger BMW Oracle Racing and third place Swiss defender Team Alinghi.

The schedule of Acts in 2005 included Acts 4 and 5 in Valencia (June 16-June 26), Acts 6 and 7 in Malmö, Sweden (August 25-September 4) and Acts 8 and 9 in Trapani, Italy (September 29-October 9).

== 2007 America's Cup program and results ==
All races were run on a windward-leeward course consisting of four legs with legs 1 and 4 being 3.3 nautical miles (6.1 km) in length, and legs 2 and 3 being 3.0 nautical miles (5.6 km) for a total of 12.6 nautical miles (23.3 km).

In the results table below, the team entering the starting area from the side (i.e. entering from the right-hand side on starboard tack) has a slight advantage. The team was decided for the first race by the toss of a coin. side advantage then alternates race by race.

Date	Team 1	Team 2	Winner	Score	Delta	Timings	Race Summary
June 23, 2007	Alinghi SUI-100	Emirates Team New Zealand NZL-92	Alinghi	1-0	0:35		Stable 12 knots (22 km/h) breeze with choppy sea. No aggression in the pre-start with both teams making good starts. Alinghi led by 0:13 at the first mark and 0:14 at the final turning mark.
June 24, 2007	Emirates Team New Zealand NZL-92	Alinghi SUI-100	Emirates Team New Zealand	1-1	0:28		10 knots (19 km/h) breeze. Aggressive pre-start with ETNZ winning the start but Alinghi led at the first two marks. Alinghi did not apply a tight cover allowing ETNZ to benefit and lead through to the finish.
June 26, 2007	Alinghi SUI-100	Emirates Team New Zealand NZL-92	Emirates Team New Zealand	1-2	0:25		Very light breeze with race start postponed twice. Aggression from Alinghi forced a poor start by ETNZ who used conditions better to lead by 1:23 at the 1st mark. The gap closed right up when ETNZ could not sheet their jib due to a spinnaker handling error. Alinghi leading at the start of the final leg allowed a left/right separation of more than a kilometre to develop. Closing the finish line ETNZ gybed slightly in front of Alinghi to win.
June 27, 2007	Emirates Team New Zealand NZL-92	Alinghi SUI-100	Alinghi	2-2	0:30		Tricky 8 to 10-knot (19 km/h) breeze. Alinghi made excellent full-speed start and rounded first mark 20 seconds ahead. ETNZ then made small gains but suffered wrap in the spinnaker during a gybe, allowing Alinghi to extend their lead. ETNZ continued attacking through to the finish.
June 29, 2007	Alinghi SUI-100	Emirates Team New Zealand NZL-92	Alinghi	3-2	0:19		Perfect 15 knots (28 km/h) sea breeze. Aggressive pre-start. ETNZ forced Alinghi across the top of the Race Committee boat and into the spectator fleet. ETNZ led by 0:12 at the first mark. For the 3rd race running ETNZ had spinnaker problems. A small rip developed in the spinnaker which then blew apart. The 2nd spinnaker was hoisted before it had been properly attached and blew like a flag from the mast head. The third spinnaker set worked after 4 minutes of chaos but Alinghi by now had gone into the lead. ETNZ got to within three boat lengths on the 2nd beat and within one boat length on the final leg but Alinghi led through to the finish.
June 30, 2007	Emirates Team New Zealand NZL-92	Alinghi SUI-100	Alinghi	4-2	0:28		Aggressive pre-start but each team made a good start. ETNZ led at the first two marks. After a tacking duel where Alinghi got a right hand shift, Alinghi led at the 3rd mark through to the finish.
July 1, 2007	Alinghi SUI-100	Emirates Team New Zealand NZL-92	Racing Postponed	4-2	NA	NA	Unstable winds caused racing to be postponed until Tuesday July 3.
July 3, 2007	Alinghi SUI-100	Emirates Team New Zealand NZL-92	Alinghi	5-2	0:01		Aggressive pre-start with both boats at full speed off the line. Alinghi rounded the windward mark 7 seconds ahead. Down the run, spinnaker handling by ETNZ looked a little better and at the bottom gate ETNZ rounded the left-hand mark and Alinghi rounded the right-hand mark 14 seconds behind. ETNZ tacked over to loose-cover Alinghi and a tacking duel ensued with Alinghi making very slight gains on each tack until eventually, still a boat length ahead, ETNZ disengaged. ETNZ tacked onto port to lay the mark and immediately bore away to go under Alinghi who was on starboard. Alinghi flew a Y flag in protest, and the Umpires awarded a penalty against ETNZ for not keeping clear. ETNZ rounded the final mark 12 seconds behind. On the run to the finish ETNZ could not close the gap until Alinghi, on their final approach to the finish, had their spinnaker pole fly off the mast collapsing the spinnaker, coinciding with a drop in the breeze and a massive 120 degree windshift to forward. Alinghi, now virtually stationary, was being overtaken. Now heading upwind (due to the massive windshift) to the line, ETNZ tacked from starboard to port and then back to starboard to satisfy their penalty, but did so with too much distance before the line, enabling Alinghi to squeeze across the finish line 1 second ahead while ETNZ was downspeed from the penalty tacks.

== Race Deltas ==
Entering Starting Area from Blue Side		Entering Starting Area from Yellow Side		Start	1^{st} Windward	1^{st} Leeward	2^{nd} Windward	Finish
June 23, 2007
(Switzerland) SUI-100	Alinghi	(New Zealand) NZL-92	Emirates Team New Zealand	00:01	00:13	00:20	00:14	00:35
June 24, 2007
(New Zealand) NZL-92	Emirates Team New Zealand	(Switzerland) SUI-100	Alinghi	00:03	00:19	00:13	00:15	00:28
June 26, 2007
(Switzerland) SUI-100	Alinghi	(New Zealand) NZL-92	Emirates Team New Zealand	00:08	01:23	01:02	00:15	00:25
June 27, 2007
(New Zealand) NZL-92	Emirates Team New Zealand	(Switzerland) SUI-100	Alinghi	00:01	00:20	00:34	00:25	00:30
June 29, 2007
(Switzerland) SUI-100	Alinghi	(New Zealand) NZL-92	Emirates Team New Zealand	00:05	00:12	00:26	00:24	00:19
June 30, 2007
(New Zealand) NZL-92	Emirates Team New Zealand	(Switzerland) SUI-100	Alinghi	00:00	00:14	00:11	00:16	00:28
July 3, 2007
(Switzerland) SUI-100	Alinghi	(New Zealand) NZL-92	Emirates Team New Zealand	00:00	00:07	00:14	00:12	00:01

== Crew ==
=== Alinghi ===
Role	Name
Skipper / Tactician	Brad Butterworth (NZL)
Helmsman	Ed Baird (USA)
Navigator	Juan Vila (ESP)
Afterguard / Runner	Ernesto Bertarelli (SUI)
Strategist / Traveller	Murray Jones (NZL)
Runner / Grinder	Rodney Ardern (NZL)
Runner / Pitman	Dean Phipps (NZL)
Mainsail Trimmer	Warwick Fleury (NZL)
Main Grinder	Will McCarthy (AUS)
Trimmer	Simon Daubney (NZL)
Trimmer	Lorenzo Mazza (ITA)
Grinder	Matt Welling (USA)
Grinder	Mark McTeigue (AUS)
Pitman	Josh Belsky (USA)
Mast	Francesco Rapetti (ITA)
Mid-Bow	Curtis Blewett (CAN)
Bow	Pieter van Nieuwenhuyzen (NED)

Peter Evans sailed the training boat for Alinghi. Other team members included Peter Holmberg, Mike Drummond, Matt Mitchell, Brian Sharp, Mark Newbrook, Jordi Calafat, Nicholas Texier and Craig Satherwaite. Grant Simmer was the managing director and Jochen Schümann the sports director.

=== Emirates Team New Zealand ===
Role	Name
Skipper / Helmsman	Dean Barker (NZL)
Tactician	Terry Hutchinson (USA)
Navigator	Kevin Hall (USA)
Strategist	Ray Davies (NZL)
Traveller/Up the mast	Adam Beashel (AUS)
Pit	Barry Mckay (NZL)
Runner /Pit	Tony Rae (NZL)
Mainsail Trimmer	Don Cowie (NZL)
Main Grinder	Chris Ward (NZL)
Trimmer Upwind	Grant Loretz (NZL)
Trimmer Downwind	James Dagg (NZL)
Grinder	Rob Waddell (NZL)
Grinder	Jono McBeth (NZL)
Mast	Matt Mason (NZL)
Floater	Grant Dalton (NZL)
Mid-Bow	Richard Meacham (NZL)
Bow	Jeremy Lomas (NZL)

Ben Ainslie and Kelvin Harrap sailed the training boat for Team New Zealand.

== See also ==
- America's Cup
- Louis Vuitton Cup
- Louis Vuitton Cup 2007
