= Alejandro Colla =

Argentine sailor (born 1970)

Personal information
- Full name: Alejandro Juan Colla
- Born: 26 December 1970 (age 55) Rosario, Argentina
- Height: 190 cm (6 ft 3 in)
- Weight: 100 kg (220 lb)

Sailing career
- Sport: Sailing
- Classes: Star, TP52, Finn, ILCA 7

Alejandro Juan Colla (born 26 December 1970) is an Argentine sailor. He competed in the Finn event at the 2004 Summer Olympics.
