= Joe Spooner =

New Zealand sailor

Joe Spooner (born 31 October 1973) is a New Zealand sailor who has competed in the Volvo Ocean Race and multiple America's Cups.

Spooner attended Saint Kentigern College and sailed with Alfa Romeo I. Spooner began his career in the Finn.

He sailed on Team News Corp during the 2001–02 Volvo Ocean Race.

Joe joined Team New Zealand and was part of their unsuccessful 2003 America's Cup campaign. He then joined Oracle Racing in 2007, and was part of their race team for the 2010 and 2013 America's Cup winning campaigns.
