= Sean Clarkson =

New Zealand sailor (born 1969)

Sean Clarkson (born 1969) is a New Zealand sailor who has sailed at the Summer Olympics and in multiple Whitbread Round the World Races and America's Cups.

Clarkson grew up in Kerikeri and attended the University of Auckland for marine biology.

== Career ==
=== Olympics ===
He represented New Zealand at the 1996 Summer Olympics, sailing in a Soling with Kelvin Harrap and Jamie Gale. They finished 14th in the competition.

=== America Cup ===
On leaving university he join New Zealand Challenge and was a grinder on board NZL 20 during the 1992 Louis Vuitton Cup. He then joined Tag Heuer Challenge for the 1995 Louis Vuitton Cup.

He then joined AmericaOne for the 2000 Louis Vuitton Cup.

He then competed in the 2003 Louis Vuitton Cup with Prada Challenge, and the 2007 Louis Vuitton Cup with BMW Oracle Racing.

He sailed with Artemis Racing in the 2011 Extreme Sailing Series, the 2011–13 America's Cup World Series and the 2013 Louis Vuitton Cup.

He was a member American Magic for the 2021 America Cup campaign.

=== Round The World ===
He competed in three edition of The Ocean Race:

- 1993–94 Whitbread Round the World Race aboard NZ Endeavour, which won the race,
- 1997–98 Whitbread Round the World Race aboard Toshiba.
- 2001–02 Volvo Ocean Race aboard Team SEB

=== Other Sailing ===
He has also won multiple TP52 World Championships and is a two-time winner of the Sydney to Hobart Yacht Race.
