= Rodney Ardern =

New Zealand sailor

Rodney Ardern is a New Zealand sailor who has competed in multiple America's Cups and Volvo Ocean Races.

Ardern attended the University of Auckland, where he studied engineering.

He was a part of New Zealand Challenge at the 1992 Louis Vuitton Cup before sailing in the 1993–94 Whitbread Round the World Race on board Tokio.

He then joined Tag Heuer Challenge for the 1995 Louis Vuitton Cup before competing in the 1997–98 Whitbread Round the World Race on Swedish Match. He was with Nippon Challenge for the 2000 Louis Vuitton Cup.

He sailed the 2001–02 Volvo Ocean Race with Team SEB and the 2005–06 event on Pirates of the Caribbean.

Ardern was a member of Alinghi when they won the 2003 America's Cup and defended the 2007 America's Cup. He was part of their 2008 IShares Cup victory and was the pitman on Alinghi 5 when it lost the 2010 America's Cup. He then joined Team Origin just before the team was disbanded in October 2010.

He then joined Artemis Racing and sailed with them in the Extreme Sailing Series and the 2013 Louis Vuitton Cup.
