= 2003 America's Cup =

31st America's Cup
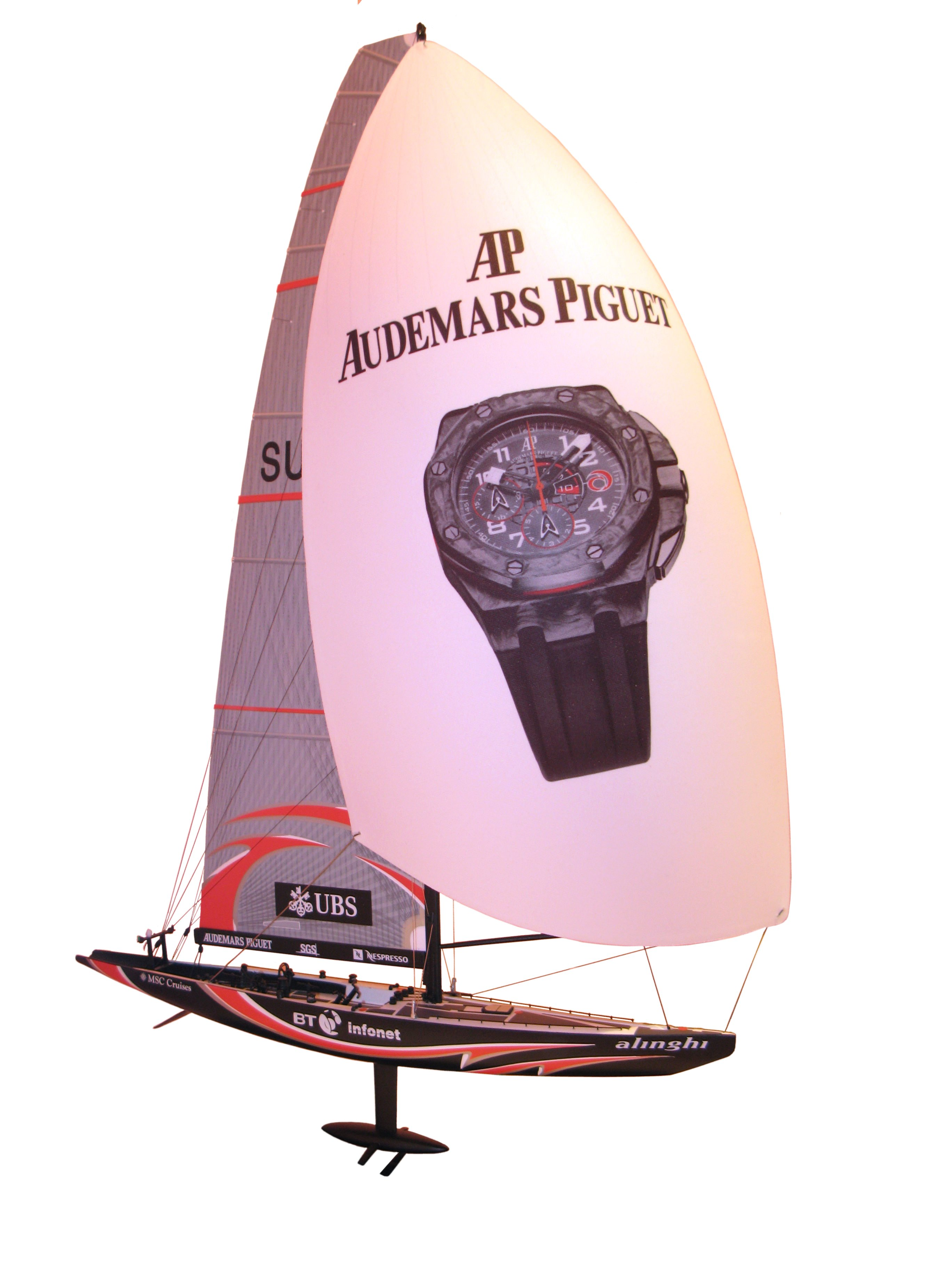
- Model of the winning yacht SUI 64

Defender New Zealand
- Defender club: Royal New Zealand Yacht Squadron
- Yacht: NZL 82

Challenger Switzerland
- Challenger club: Société Nautique de Genève
- Yacht: SUI 64

Competition
- Location: Auckland, New Zealand
- 36°50′40″S 174°45′49″E
- Dates: 15 February – 2 March 2003
- Rule: International America's Cup Class
- Winner: Société Nautique de Genève
- Score: 5–0

The 31st America's Cup was contested between the holder, Team New Zealand, and the winner of the 2003 Louis Vuitton Cup, Alinghi.

== Build Up ==
The 2002–2003 Louis Vuitton Cup, held in the Hauraki Gulf in Auckland, New Zealand saw nine teams from six countries staging 120 races over five months to select a challenger for the America's Cup. Due to sponsorship rules in force at the time, the boats were not allowed to be named after their sponsors which affected only one challenger. The Oracle boat was referenced by its sail number USA-76 because the team did not give the boat a name.

On January 19, 2003, the Swiss challenger Ernesto Bertarelli’s Alinghi, skippered by Russell Coutts, won the Louis Vuitton Cup Finals by defeating the American challenger, Larry Ellison's Oracle, 5–1, once again eliminating the United States from the America's Cup competition.

== The America's Cup Races ==
Racing for the America's Cup began On February 15, 2003. In a stiff breeze, Alinghi won the first race easily after New Zealand, skippered throughout the series by Dean Barker, withdrew due to multiple gear failures in the rigging and the low cockpit unexpectedly taking onboard large quantities of water.

Race 2, on February 16, 2003, was won by Alinghi by a margin of only seven seconds. It was one of the closest, most exciting races seen for years, with the lead changing several times and a duel of 33 tacking manoeuvres on the fifth leg.

Then on February 18, in Race 3, Alinghi won the critical start, after receiving last minute advice about a wind shift, and led throughout the race, winning with a 23-second margin.

After nine days without being able to race, first due to a lack of wind, then with high winds and rough seas making it too dangerous to race, February 28, originally a planned lay-day, was chosen as a race day. Race 4 was again sailed in strong winds and rough seas and New Zealand's difficulties continued, when her mast snapped on the third leg.

The next day, March 1, 2003, was again a frustratingly calm day, the race finally being called off after the yachts had again spent over two hours waiting for a start in the light air. Alinghi skipper Russell Coutts was unable to celebrate his 41st birthday with a cup win, but was in a commanding position in the series to do so on March 2. Race 5 started on time in a good breeze. Alinghi again won the start and kept ahead. On the forth leg, New Zealand broke a spinnaker pole during a manoeuvre. Although it was put overboard and replaced with a spare pole, New Zealand was unable to recover, conceding Alinghi's sweep to the title.

The win by Alinghi meant Coutts, who had previously sailed for New Zealand, had won every one of the last 14 America's Cup races he had competed in as skipper, the most by any America's Cup skipper. This meant he had won an America's Cup regatta twice as challenger, as well as having been a successful defender.

=== Race Summary ===
Date	Winner	Yacht	Loser	Yacht	Score	Delta
15 February 2003	Alinghi	SUI 64	Team New Zealand	NZL 82	1–0	Retired
16 February 2003	Alinghi	SUI 64	Team New Zealand	NZL 82	2–0	0:07
18 February 2003	Alinghi	SUI 64	Team New Zealand	NZL 82	3–0	0:23
28 February 2003	Alinghi	SUI 64	Team New Zealand	NZL 82	4–0	Retired
2 March 2003	Alinghi	SUI 64	Team New Zealand	NZL 82	5–0	0:44

== Crew ==
=== Team New Zealand ===
Role	Name
Skipper / Helmsman	Dean Barker
Navigator	Mike Drummond / Tom Schnackenberg
Tactician	Hamish Pepper (Races 1-3) / Bertrand Pacé (Races 4-5)
Strategists	Peter Evans, Adam Beashel, Erle Williams, Tom Dodson
Trimmers	James Dagg, Grant Loretz, Tony Rae, Chris Salthouse, Carsten Schon, Zachary Hurst
Grinders	Ian Baker, Jono MacBeth, Daniel Fong, Chris McAsey, Joe Spooner, Rob Waddell, Carl Whiting, Chris Ward
Bow/pit/mast	Nathan Handley, Joey Allen, Jared Henderson, Nick Heron, Jeremy Lomas, Winston Macfarlane, Barry McKay, Lance Manson, Richard Meacham, Matt Mitchell, Craig Satterthwaite

Cameron Appleton was the backup helmsman with Rod Davis, Dan Slater and Clay Oliver in the reserve afterguard.

=== Alinghi ===
Role	Name
Skipper / Helmsman	Russell Coutts
Tactician	Brad Butterworth
Navigator	Ernesto Bertarelli
Strategists	Jochen Schümann
Trimmers	Warwick Fleury, Murray Jones, Simon Daubney, Richard Bouzaid
Grinders	Pieter van Nieuwenhuyzen, Christian Karcher, John Barnitt, Kaj Bjorn
Bow/pit/mast	Dominik Neidhart, Josh Belsky, Enrico De Maria, Dean Phipps, Curtis Blewett, Francesco Rapetti
