= Juan Vila =

Spanish sailor

Juan Vila (12 November 1961) is a Spanish sailor who has competed in multiple America's Cups and Whitbread Round the World Races.

Born in Barcelona, Vila sailed in the 1989–90 Whitbread Round the World Race on the Spanish entry, Fortuna Extra Lights. He then competed in the 1993–94 event on Galicia '93 Pescanova, the 1997–98 event with Chessie Racing, and the 2001–02 event on Illbruck Challenge. Illbruck Challenge won the event, now renamed as the Volvo Ocean Race. He was the first Spanish sailor to win the trophy.

He then joined Alinghi and was their navigator during the successful defence of the 2007 America's Cup. He sailed as navigator on Alinghi 5 when it lost the 2010 America's Cup.

He sailed with Banque Populaire V when it won the Jules Verne Trophy in 2012. The team had to abandon an earlier attempt at the record in 2011.

He sailed in the 2013 Sydney to Hobart Yacht Race on Giacomo and on Wild Oats XI in the 2016 Sydney to Hobart Yacht Race.

Vila later joined Oracle Racing and was part of their design team for the 2017 America's Cup. He will sail on Mapfre in the 2017–18 Volvo Ocean Race.
