= Adrian Stead =

Olympic sailor from Great Britain

Personal information
- Full name: Adrian George Curry Stead
- Nationality: United Kingdom
- Born: 20 February 1967 (age 59) Poole
- Height: 1.75 m (5.7 ft)

Sailing career
- Sport: Sailing
- Club: Parkstone Yacht Club
- Class: Soling
- Updated on 29 February 2020

Adrian Stead (born 20 February 1967) is a sailor from Poole, Great Britain. who represented his country at the 1996 Summer Olympics in Savannah, United States as crew member in the Soling. With helmsman Andy Beadsworth and fellow crew member Barry Parkin they took the 4th place.

He went on to become one of Britain's most successful yachtman winning pinnacle offshore events like the Rolex Fastnet Race and also multiple World Championships titles including the following:

- 1998 Farr 40 World Championship
- 2007 Farr 40 World Championship
- 2008 Farr 40 World Championship
- 2010 TP52 World Championship
- 2011 TP52 World Championship
- 2013 Swan 60 OD World Championship
- 2013 TP52 World Championship
- 2016 RC44 World Championship
- 2025 ORCi World Championships
