= Grant Loretz =

New Zealand sailor

Grant Loretz is a New Zealand sailor who has competed in multiple America's Cups.

Born in Tokoroa, Loretz joined New Zealand Challenge, working as a sail-maker for the 1987 Louis Vuitton Cup. At the 1992 Louis Vuitton Cup he sailed on NZL-20 as a trimmer. During the 1995 Louis Vuitton Cup he was a part of Tag Heuer Challenge, sailing on NZL-39.

He then joined Team New Zealand and was part of the 2000 America's Cup victory and unsuccessful 2003 America's Cup defence. He remained with the team and was part of the campaign for the 2007 Louis Vuitton Cup and 2007 America's Cup. He was Team New Zealand's sail co-coordinator during the 2013 America's Cup.
