= Kim Christensen =

Kim Christensen may refer to:

- Kim Christensen (footballer, born 1979), goalkeeper
- Kim Christensen (footballer, born 1980), striker
- Kim Christensen (shot putter)
- Kim Christensen (journalist) (1952–2024)

== See also ==
- Kim Kristensen, Danish footballer and football coach
