= Warwick Fleury =

New Zealand sailor

Warwick David Fleury is a New Zealand sailor who has competed in eight America's Cups.

He competed with New Zealand Challenge in the 1987, 1988 and 1992 America's Cup campaigns.

Fleury was a trimmer with Team New Zealand during their successful 1995 America's Cup campaign and 2000 America's Cup defence.

Fleury joined Alinghi and was part of their 2003 America's Cup victory, 2007 America's Cup defence and 2010 America's Cup loss. In 2010 he was inducted into the America's Cup Hall of Fame.

He sailed with Ken Read, Daryl Wislang, Kelvin Harrap and James Spithill on board Comanche in the 2015 Sydney to Hobart Yacht Race.

On 6 September 2023, Fleury was at the Rolex Cup in Porto Cervo and was ill. His conditions were desperate, but the doctors at the Sassari hospital saved him with open heart surgery. In eight hours the team placed a pressure on the aortic root and ascending aorta and performed the replacement of the aortic valve and the reimplantation of the coronary artery.
