= Mariano Parada =

Argentine sailor

Personal information
- Nationality: Argentine
- Born: 30 May 1970 (age 54)

Sailing career
- Club: Yacht Club Argentino

Mariano Parada (born 30 May 1970) is an Argentine sailor. He competed in the Tornado event at the 2000 Summer Olympics.
