= David Vera =

Olympic sailor from Spain

Personal information
- Full name: David Vera San Luis
- Nationality: Spain
- Born: 19 July 1970 (age 55) Las Palmas de Gran Canaria
- Height: 1.87 m (6.1 ft)

Sailing career
- Sport: Sailing
- Class: Soling
- Updated on 29 February 2020

David Vera (born 19 July 1970) is a sailor from Las Palmas de Gran Canaria, Spain. who represented his country at the 1996 Summer Olympics in Savannah, United States as crew member in the Soling. With helmsman Luis Doreste and fellow crew member Domingo Manrique they took the 6th place.
