= James Dagg =

New Zealand sailor

James Dagg is a New Zealand sailor who has competed in multiple America's Cups.

Dagg joined Team New Zealand in 1996 as a trimmer. He was part of their 2000 America's Cup defence.

He sailed in their 2003 America's Cup loss and remained with the team for their 2007 Louis Vuitton Cup victory and 2007 America's Cup loss.

He sailed in the 2010 Louis Vuitton Trophy Auckland, and the 2010 and 2011 Extreme Sailing Series. He was part of Team New Zealand's 2011–13 America's Cup World Series campaign and their 2013 America's Cup loss. He then sailed with them in the 2014 Extreme Sailing Series before missing out on a retainer contract and leaving the team.

He joined Bella Mente Racing in 2014.
