= Formula 16 World Championship =

Formula 16 Catamaran Worlds

The Formula 16 World Championship also known as the F16 World Championship is an annual international sailing regatta for Formula 16, organized by the host club on behalf of the International Formula 16 Class Association and recognized by World Sailing, the sports IOC recognized governing body.

== Editions ==
Event			Host			Sailors			Boats				Ref.
Ed.	Date	Year	Host club	Location	Nat.	No.	Nat.	Cont.	To.			Mix	Ref.
1	16-23 Jul	2011	Cercle Voile Bordeaux Carcans Maubuisson	Maubuisson, Carcans, Gironde	France	62	10	4	33	14	3	15	
2	20-26 Jul	2013	Travemuender Woche; Lubecker Yacht Club	Travemünde, Lübeck	Germany	63	8	1	32	20	1	11	
3	23-27 Jun	2014	Sail Newport	Newport	United States	53	3	3	28	16	0	12	
4	16-22 Jul	2016	Royal Belgium Saling Club, Duinbergen	Knokke-Heist	Belgium	86	8	2	45	25	2	18	
5	24-29 Jun	2018	Royal Brighton Yacht Club	Brighton, Victoria	Australia								
N/A	18-24 Jul	2020	AVAL - Lago di Como	Gravedona, Lake Como	Italy	CANCELLED DUE TO COVID							
N/A	19-25 Jul	2021	AVAL - Lago di Como	Gravedona, Lake Como	Italy	CANCELLED DUE TO COVID							
6	23-28 Jul	2022	Travemuender Woche; Lubecker Yacht Club	Travemünde, Lübeck	Germany	61	8	1	32	21	1	10	
7	21-26 Jul	2024	Aval Associazione Velica Alto Lario	Gravedona, Lake Como	Italy	97	10	3	51	31	2	18	
8	28-31 Jul	2025	Watersportvereniging - Bestevaer	Medemblik	Netherlands	59	9	2	31	17	1	13	

== Medalists ==
Year	Gold	Silver	Bronze	Ref.
2011	NED 888; Darren Bundock (NED); Céline Van Dooren (NED)	AUS 222; Jason Waterhouse (AUS); Brett Goodall (AUS)	USA 2 Taylor Reiss (USA); Matthew Whitehead (USA)	
2013	BEL 888; Henri Demesmaeker (BEL); Jeroen Van Leeuwen (NED)	BEL 666; Aurélie Van Schoote (BEL); Morgan Good (BEL)	FRA 2016; Vincent Domand (FRA); Fanny Merelle (FRA)	
2014	AUS 526; Adrian Fawcett (AUS); Jesse Dobie (AUS)	USA 273; Ravi Parent (USA); Sam Armington (USA)	USA 213; Robbie Daniel (USA); Catherine Shannahan (USA)	
2016	BEL 3 - Viper Henri Demesmaeker (BEL); Alec Bagué (BEL)	FRA 86 - Bimare Emmanuel Le Chapelier (FRA); Eric Le Bouedec (FRA)	FRA 68 - Bimare Louis Flament (FRA); Charles Dorange (FRA)	
2018				
2020	CANCELLED DUE TO COVID			
2021	CANCELLED DUE TO COVID			
2022	FRA 141 - Nacra F16; Thomas Proust (FRA); Clement Martineau (FRA)	FRA 16 - Viper 2 Emmanuel Le Chapelier (FRA); Eric Le Bouëdec (FRA)	NED 23 - Nacra F16; Robin Mineur (NED); Sander Mineur (NED)	
2024	AUS 800 - Viper 2 Emma Rankin (AUS); Beau White (AUS)	FRA 24 - Befoil F16; Emmanuel Le Chapelier (FRA); Eric Le Bouëdec (FRA)	FRA 31 - Viper 1 Michel Kermarec (FRA); Fanny Merelle (FRA)	
2025	FRA 1 - Befoil F16; Emmanuel Le Chapelier (FRA); Eric Le Bouedec (FRA)	FRA 31 - Viper 1 Michel Kermarec (FRA); Fanny Merelle (FRA)	AUS 800 - Viper 2 Emma Rankin (AUS); Beau White (AUS)	
