= Sonar World Championship =

The Sonar World Championship is an bi-annual international sailing regatta for Sonar (keelboat), organized by the host club on behalf of the International Sonar Class Association and recognized by World Sailing, the sports IOC recognized governing body.

== Editions ==
Host cities of the World Championship

Edition			Host			Boat	Sailors					Ref
No.	Date	Year	Host club	Location	Nat.	Boat	Nat.	Cont.	No.			Ref
1	15-21 Sep	2001	Noroton Yacht Club	Darien, Connecticut	United States	37	1+	1+				
N/A	5-11 Oct	2003	St. Petersburg Yacht Club, Florida	St. Petersburg, Florida	United States	Postponed to 2004						
2	8-12 Feb	2004	St. Petersburg Yacht Club, Florida	St. Petersburg, Florida	United States	25	8	3	101	90	11	
3	24-30 Sep	2005	Island Sailing Club, Cowes	Cowes, Isle of Wight	United Kingdom	25	5	3	102	90	12	
4	18-22 Sep	2007	Eastern Yacht Club	Marblehead, Massachusetts	United States	51	4+	2+				
5	29Sep -4Oct	2009	Noroton Yacht Club	Darien, Connecticut	United States	58	7+	3+				
6	23-27 Aug	2011	Royal Northern and Clyde Yacht Club	Rhu Peninsula	United Kingdom	18	2+	2+				
7	17-22 Sep	2013	Rochester Yacht Club	Rochester, New York	United States	30	5+	3+				
8	16-20 Sep	2015	Falmouth Yacht Club	Falmouth, Maine	United States	27	3+	2+				
9	6-10 Sep	2017	Lunenburg Yacht Club	Lunenburg, Nova Scotia	Canada	25	3	2	96	85	11	
10	17-22 Sep	2019	Rochester Yacht Club	Rochester, New York	United States	29	3+	2+				
11	17Jun -19Jul	2022	Lake Sunapee Yacht Club	Sunapee, New Hampshire	United States	22	2	1	88	75	13	
12	11-15 Sep	2024	Noroton Yacht Club	Darien, Connecticut	United States	31	3	2	128	97	31	

== Medalists ==
Games	Gold	Silver	Bronze
2001	USA 503; Mark Ploch (USA) Paul Beaudin (USA); Tac Boston (USA); Mark Weber (USA)	USA 360; Craig Sinclair (USA)	USA 384 - Nefarious; Steve Shepstone (USA)
2004	USA 384; Steve Shepstone (USA) Melissa Shepstone (USA); Thomas Kinney (USA); Michael Loeb (USA)	Peter Galloway (USA)	John Ross-Duggan (USA)
2005	Nefarious Steven Shepstone (USA); Thomas Kinney (USA); Peter Wilson (USA); Michael Loeb (USA)	Billy Paul Bowen (GBR); Duncan Bates (GBR); Shaun Kellett (GBR); Dave Thompson (GBR)	Fast Forward Peter Galloway (USA); James Linville (USA); Paul Steinborn (USA); Ched Proctor (USA)
2007	USA 653 (35); Bill Lynn (USA) Chris HufStader (USA); Ed Keller (USA); Doug Sabin (USA)	USA 439 (14) - Troll; Greg Anthony (USA)	USA 753 (48) - Dominatrix; Rick Dominique (USA)
2009	USA 369; Dave Franzel (USA); Todd Cooper (USA); Greg Anthony (USA); Conor Hayes (USA)	USA 564; Judson Smith (USA)	USA 411; Karl Ziegler (USA)
2011	Nefarious; Steve Shepstone (USA); UNKNOWN; UNKNOWN	Bertie; Simon Barter (GBR)	Jack; Scott McLeod (USA)
2013	USA 841 (4) - Rafiki Eric Voss (USA); Kurt Voss (USA); Terry Shannon (USA); Judson Smith (USA)	USA 506 (23) - Evil Empire; Colin Gordon (USA)	USA 701 (21) - Fast Forward; Peter Galloway (USA)
2015	24 / USA 360 – Spitfire; Karl Ziegler (USA); UNKNOWN; UNKNOWN	17 / USA 825 – Repulse; Dave Franzel (USA); UNKNOWN; UNKNOWN	9 / CAN 834 – Bella Rena; Bella Rena (CAN); UNKNOWN; UNKNOWN
2017	USA 701 – Fast Forward Peter Galloway (USA); Garin Pace (USA); Ched Proctor (USA); Judy Lugar (USA)	USA 360 – Spitfire Karl Ziegler (USA)	USA 841 – Rafiki Eric Voss (USA)
2019	Michael Wilde (USA); UNKNOWN; UNKNOWN	Brian Doyle (USA); UNKNOWN; UNKNOWN	Eric Voss (USA); UNKNOWN; UNKNOWN
2022	Nefarious – USA 384 Bob Lawrence (USA); Paul Sevigny (USA); Victor Diaz De Leon (USA); Willem Van Waay (USA)	CAN 754 – Ping Andreas Josenhans (CAN); Kathryn Josenhans (CAN); Judy Lugar (CAN); Alex Ritchie (CAN)	USA 787 – Resonance Brian Doyle (USA); Tom Kinney (USA); Shane Wells (USA); Courtland Doyl (USA)
2024	USA 654 - Wind Morgan Connor (USA); Jan Raymond (USA); Wells Connor (USA); Andrew Buttner (USA)	USA 701 - Fast Forward Garin Pace (USA); Paul Steinborn (USA); Ched Proctor (USA); Ed Steinborn (USA)	USA 506 T K (USA); Alison Widmann (USA); Kevin Sheehan (USA); Howard Seymour (USA)
