= Anthony Langley =

British businessman

Tony Langley
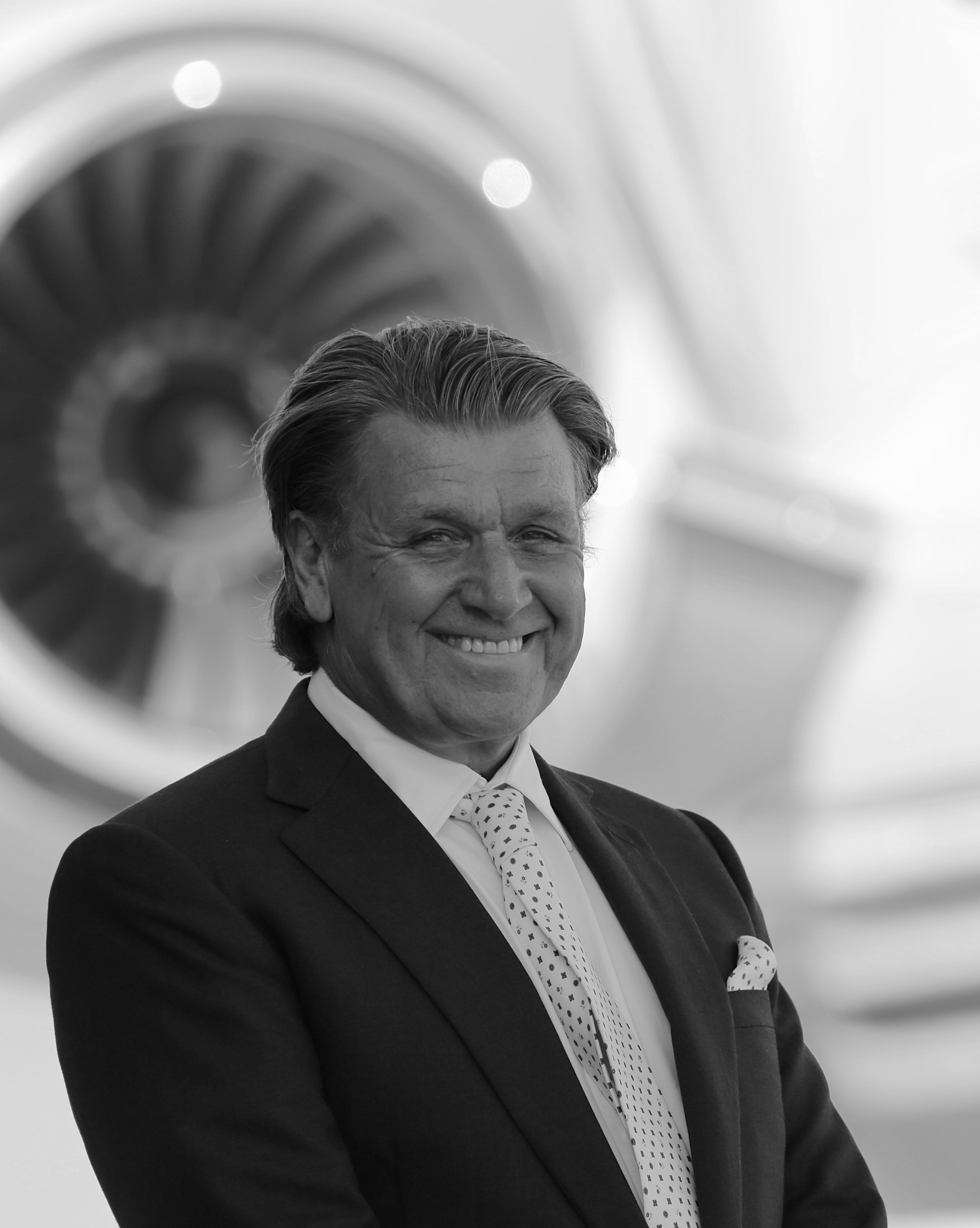
- Born: Anthony John Langley; December 1954 (age 71)
- Occupation: Industrialist
- Children: 3
- Website: http://www.langleyholdings.com

Anthony John Langley (born December 1954) is a British billionaire industrialist, the owner of the international engineering and industrial group, Langley Holdings plc, which he founded in 1975.

== Career ==
Langley is the owner of Langley Holdings, an engineering group based in Retford, Nottinghamshire, England. The group currently has over 90 trading subsidiaries and employs over 5,000 people world wide, the majority at its factories in Norway, Germany, France and Italy.

Langley started the business in 1975, out of the ruins of his dissolved family business, aged just 21. In 2000, Langley bought Clarke Chapman, and sales reached $75 million. This gave means to the growth of Langley's company, and the portfolio grew to an estimated $1 billion revenue by 2015, largely by acquiring and turning around under-performing engineering businesses.

In August 2021 Langley Holdings announced that it had entered into an Agreement with Rolls-Royce PLC to acquire Bergen Engines AS in Norway. The company employs 960 people worldwide, of which approximately 650 are in Norway. The Bergen Engines deal was completed on 31 December, and is boosting revenues to around $2 billion in 2026 as the group pivots to providing power to the booming AI data center sector.

== Net Worth ==
In 2020, Langley received a dividend payout of €90 million, his first since 2016, as the sole shareholder of Langley Holdings. As of March 2026, Forbes estimated his net worth at US$3.6 billion. He entered the Forbes Billionaires list in March 2016 with an estimated fortune of $1.1 billion. In the same month the magazine published an interview with Langley. “The Long Road to a Billion: Tony Langley's 40-Year Journey To The Billionaires' List”

In May 2026, the Sunday Times Rich List estimated his net worth at £2.15 billion.

== Personal life ==
Langley lives in Nottinghamshire and Norfolk, England, with his wife. The couple have one daughter and two sons; all three work within Langley's organization in senior management positions. Langley owns several other homes in the UK and abroad, including a ski chalet in Courchevel, France.

Langley is the owner of two superyachts: the 39 meter motor yacht Corinthian and the 48.5 meter sailing yacht Thalia.

An accomplished yachtsman, Langley is the principal of the Langley group owned Gladiator Sailing Team, which competes in elite international yacht racing. In 2024, the team were crowned Rolex TP52 World Champions in Newport RI. He is a longtime member of the Royal Thames Yacht Club.

A qualified pilot since 1988, Langley flies both rotary and fixed wing aircraft. The Langley group owns and operates several aircraft, including a Gulfstream G550, which it acquired in 2014 and a Gulfstream G450, acquired in 2026.
