= Guillermo Parada =

Argentine sailor (born 1967)

Personal information
- Full name: Guillermo Pedro Parada
- Nationality: Argentine
- Born: 28 September 1967 (age 58)
- Height: 178 cm (5 ft 10 in)
- Weight: 73 kg (161 lb)

Sailing career
- Sport: Sailing
- Class(es): J/24, TP52, Snipe, J/70, Cadet, 470, Lightning, Soto 40

Guillermo Pedro Parada (born 28 September 1967) is an Argentine sailor. He competed in the men's 470 event at the 1988 Summer Olympics.
