= Clube Naval de Cascais =

Portuguese rowing club

- Burgee

- Portuguese National Ensign
- Short name: CNC
- Founded: 1938
- Location: Cascais, Portugal
- Focus: Sailing
- Website: www.cncascais.com/en

The Clube Naval de Cascais was founded in 1938,

The main sports are the sailing. The club has held numerous world championships in sailing including the main qualifying event for the 2008 Olympic Games the 2007 ISAF Sailing World Championships.
