= GP14 World Championship =

Sailing World Championship

The GP14 World Championships is an bi annual international sailing regatta. The event is organized by the host club on behalf of the International Class Association and recognized by World Sailing, the sports IOC recognized governing body. The championships typically take place in United Kingdom or Ireland.

== Events ==
Event			Host			Athlete			Boats					Ref.
Ed.	Dates	Year	Host club	Location	Country	No.	Nat.	Cont.	No.	M	F	M/F	F/M	Ref.
1	-	2000	Pier Yacht Club	Durban	South Africa		5	3	58					
2	9-15 Aug	2003	South Caernarvonshire Yacht Club	Abersoch, Wales	United Kingdom		8+	4+	171					
3	-	2006	Sligo Yacht Club	Rosses Point	Ireland	222	5	3	111	76	2	25	8	
4	2-8 Aug	2008	South Caernarvonshire Yacht Club	Abersoch, Wales	United Kingdom	214	4	2	106					
5	20-25 Feb	2011	Beach Hotel Negombo		Sri Lanka				37					
6	11-17 Aug	2012	Looe Sailing Club	Looe, Cornwall	United Kingdom	254	6	4	127	85	2	30	10	
7	9-15 Aug	2014	East Down Yacht Club	Killyleagh, County Down	United Kingdom		2+	1+	93	66	3	19	5	
8	-	2016	Barbados Yacht Club		Barbados	210	8	5	105	66	3	32	4	
9	29Jul -3Aug	2018	Mounts Bay Sailing Club, Cornwall	Mount's Bay	United Kingdom	238	5	4	119	80	6	31	2	
N/A	25-31 Jul	2020	Skerries Sailing Club	Skerries, County Dublin	Ireland	Cancelled due to COVID								
N/A	Jul	2021	Skerries Sailing Club	Skerries, County Dublin	Ireland	Cancelled due to COVID								
10	-	2022	Skerries Sailing Club	Skerries, County Dublin	Ireland		3+	2+	104	66	9	28	1	
11	-	2024	Plas Heli	Pwllheli	United Kingdom	170	7	3	85	54	7	21	3	
12	-	2026	Royal North of Ireland Yacht Club	Holywood, County Down, NI	United Kingdom	181	6	5	90	48	6	29	7	-

== Multiple World Champions ==
Compiled from the data below the table includes up to and including 20.

Ranking	Sailor	Gold	Silver	Bronze	Total	No. Entries (1)	Ref.
1							

(1) Full results for some early years are not available so this could be an under estimation

== Medalist ==
Year	Gold	Silver	Bronze	Ref.
2000	Richard Estaugh (GBR); Andrew Thompson (GBR)	Richard Instone (GBR); Chris Anderson (GBR)	Damien Bracken (IRL); Alan Parker (IRL)	
2003	13654; Neil Marsden (GBR); Derek Hill (GBR)	13821; Richard Estaugh (GBR); Simon Potts (GBR)	13818; Matthew Flint (GBR); Phil Cox (GBR)	
2005	GBR 13924; Ian Dobson (GBR); Andy Tunnicliffe (GBR)	GBR 13907; Tim Jones (GBR); Dale Knowles (GBR)	GBR 13904; Neil Platt (GBR); Derek Hill (GBR)	
2008	14021; Ian Dobson (GBR); Andy Tunnicliffe (GBR)	13654; Neil Marsden (GBR); Derek Hill (GBR)	13849; Ian Platt (GBR); Matt Johnson (GBR)	
2011	14021; Ian Dobson (GBR); Andy Tunnicliffe (GBR)	14067; Simon Potts (GBR); David Hayes (GBR)	13917; Curly Morris (IRL); Laura Mcfarland (IRL)	
2012	14021; Ian Dobson (GBR); Andy Tunnicliffe (GBR)	14095; Matt Burge (GBR); Richard Wagstaff (GBR)	14123; Christian Birrell (GBR); Ben Ainsworth (GBR)	
2014	14023; Ian Dobson (GBR); Andy Tunnicliffe (GBR)	14132; Sam Watson (GBR); Andy Hunter (GBR)	55; Robert Gullan (25x17px); Jack Holden (25x17px)	
2016	14158; Shane Mccarthy (IRL); Andy Davies (IRL)	14186; Ian Dobson (GBR); Andy Tunnicliffe (GBR)	14023; Nick Craig (GBR); Tobytastic Lewis (GBR)	
2018	13417; Mike Senior (GBR); Chris White (GBR)	14242; Ross Kearney (GBR); Ed Bradburn (GBR)	13654; Neil Marsden (GBR); Derek Hill (GBR)	
2000	COVID			
2022	Ian Dobson (GBR); Andy Tunnicliffe (GBR)	Matt Mee (GBR); Chris Robinson (GBR)	Nick Craig (GBR); Toby Lewis (GBR)	
2024	GBR-14023; Matt Mee (GBR); Chris Robinson (GBR)	GBR-14125; Tom Gillard (GBR); Shandy (GBR)	GBR-6425; Neil Marsden (GBR); Derek Hill (GBR)	
2026	14256; Ger Owens (IRL); Mel Morris (IRL)	13981; Sam Street (IRL); Josh Lloyd (IRL)	14095; Oli Hale (GBR); Harry Shaw (GBR)	
