= Louis Vuitton Acts =

Series of International America's Cup Class regattas

The Louis Vuitton Acts were a series of International America's Cup Class regattas leading up to the 2007 Louis Vuitton Cup and 2007 America's Cup. Thirteen regattas or acts were held in total. These regattas involved all eleven challengers plus the holder of the America's Cup, Alinghi, and allowed the challengers to earn bonus points that went towards the Louis Vuitton Cup. The 2004-2007 period was the first time this format had been used in America's Cup racing.

== 2004 ACC Championship ==
The 2004 ACC Championship was won by Team New Zealand.

Country	Team name	Yacht Club	Act 1	Act 2	Act 3	Points	Ranking
New Zealand	Emirates Team New Zealand	Royal New Zealand Yacht Squadron	3	1	2	6	1
United States	BMW Oracle Racing	Golden Gate Yacht Club	1	3	3	7	2
Switzerland	Alinghi	Société Nautique de Genève	2	4	1	7	3
Italy	Luna Rossa Challenge	Yacht Club Italiano	DNC*	2	4	13	4
France	Le Défi	Union Nationale Pour La Course au Large	4	5	6	15	5
France	K Challenge	Cercle de la Voile de Paris	5	6	5	16	6
South Africa	Team Shosholoza	Royal Cape Yacht Club	6	8	7	21	7
Italy	+39 Challenge	Circolo Vela Gargnano	DNC*	7	8	22	8

* The two teams that DNC in Act 1 received 7 points.

=== Act 1 ===
Act One was sailed in Marseille, France. The Act was scheduled to consist of six fleet races and a round robin of match races, however two fleet races were canceled due to poor weather. BMW Oracle Racing won Act 1.

- Act 1 saw the debut of FRA 57 and RSA 48, the rebadged NZL 57 and ITA 48 from the 2000 America's Cup.

Team Name	Fleet Race 1	Fleet Race 3	Fleet Race 5	Fleet Race 6	Fleet Racing Pts	Match Racing Pts	Total Pts	Ranking
(United States) BMW Oracle Racing (USA 76)	3rd	1st	1st	1st	22	24	46	1
(Switzerland) Alinghi (SUI 64)	1st	2nd	3rd	2nd	20	24	44	2
Team New Zealand (NZL 82)	2nd	3rd	2nd	3rd	18	24	42	3
(France) Le Defi (FRA 69)	6th	6th	6th	5th	5	12	17	4
(France) K Challenge (FRA 57)	4th	4th	5th	4th	11	6	17	5
(South Africa) Team Shosholoza (RSA 48)	5th	5th	4th	6th	8	0	8	6

	KCH	LDF	TNZ	TSH	ALI	BMW
KCH		L	L	W	L	L
LDF	W		L	W	L	L
TNZ	W	W		W	W	L
TSH	L	L	L		L	L
ALI	W	W	L	W		W
BMW	W	W	W	W	L	

=== Act 2 ===
Act Two was sailed in Valencia, Spain. This was the first regatta in the port that was to host the 2007 Louis Vuitton Cup and America's Cup. Three rounds of racing were lost to poor weather. The Act consisted of a double round robin of match races. Emirates Team New Zealand won Act 2.

- Act 2 saw the debut of FRA 60 and ITA 59, a rebadged NZL 60 and SUI 59 from the 2000 America's Cup and 2000 Louis Vuitton Cup respectively.
- Team New Zealand used NZL 81 after NZL 82 was damaged in a storm after the Marseille leg, BMW Oracle Racing used USA 71 for the same reason.

Team Name	Won	Lost	Postponed	Total Pts	Ranking
Team New Zealand (NZL 81)	10	1	3	11.5	1
(Italy) Luna Rossa (ITA 74)	9	2	3	10.5	2
(United States) BMW Oracle Racing (USA 71)	8	3	3	9.5	3
(Switzerland) Alinghi (SUI 64)	8	3	3	9.5	4
(France) Le Defi (FRA 69)	4	7	3	5.5	5
(France) K Challenge (FRA 60)	3	8	3	4.5	6
(Italy) +39 Challenge (ITA 59)	2	9	3	3.5	7
(South Africa) Team Shosholoza (RSA 48)	0	11	3	1.5	8

	KCH	LDF	+39	LRS	TNZ	TSH	ALI	BMW
KCH		W/L	W/P	L/P	L/L	W/P	L/L	L/L
LDF	L/W		W/L	L/L	L/P	W/W	L/P	L/P
+39	L/P	L/W		L/P	L/L	W/P	L/L	L/L
LRS	W/P	W/W	W/P		W/L	W/P	L/W	W/W
TNZ	W/W	W/P	W/W	L/W		W/W	W/P	W/P
TSH	L/P	L/L	L/P	L/P	L/L		L/L	L/L
ALI	W/W	W/P	W/W	W/L	L/P	W/W		L/P
BMW	W/W	W/P	W/W	L/L	L/P	W/W	W/P	

=== Act 3 ===
Act Three was sailed in Valencia, Spain. The Act was scheduled to consist of seven fleet races, however one fleet race was canceled due to poor weather. Alinghi won Act 3.

Team Name	Race 1	Race 2	Race 3	Race 4	Race 5	Race 6	Points	Ranking
(Switzerland) Alinghi (SUI 64)	4th	1st	3rd	1st	3rd	2nd	40	1
Team New Zealand (NZL 81)	1st	2nd	1st	6th	5th	1st	38	2
(United States) BMW Oracle Racing (USA 71)	5th	6th	2nd	3rd	1st	3rd	34	3
(Italy) Luna Rossa (ITA 74)	3rd	4th	7th	2nd	4th	4th	30	4
(France) K Challenge (FRA 60)	8th	3rd	4th	4th	2nd	5th	28	5
(France) Le Defi (FRA 69)	2nd	7th	8th	5th	7th	8th	17	6
(South Africa) Team Shosholoza (RSA 48)	7th	5th	5th	7th	8th	7th	15	7
(Italy) +39 Challenge (ITA 59)	6th	8th	6th	DNF	6th	6th	13	8

== 2005 ACC Championship ==
The 2005 ACC Championship was won by Alinghi.

Country	Team name	Yacht Club	Act 4	Act 5	Act 6	Act 7	Act 8	Act 9	Points	Ranking
Switzerland	Alinghi	Société Nautique de Genève	1	2	1	1	1	1	71	1
New Zealand	Emirates Team New Zealand	Royal New Zealand Yacht Squadron	2	3	3	4	2	3	61	2
United States	BMW Oracle Racing	Golden Gate Yacht Club	3	4	2	2	4	2	61	3
Italy	Luna Rossa Challenge	Yacht Club Italiano	4	1	4	3	3	6	57	4
Spain	Desafío Español 2007	Real Federación Española de Vela	6	8	5	5	8	4	42	5
Sweden	Victory Challenge	Gamla Stans Yacht Sällskap	5	6	8	11	6	8	34	6
France	K Challenge	Cercle de la Voile de Paris	7	7	9	6	5	12	32	7
Italy	+39 Challenge	Circolo Vela Gargnano	9	9	6	8	7	7	32	8
Italy	Mascalzone Latino - Capitalia Team	Reale Yacht Club Canottieri Savoia	8	5	7	9	9	10	30	9
Germany	United Internet Team Germany	Deutscher Challenger Yacht Club	10	10	10	7	11	9	21	10
South Africa	Team Shosholoza	Royal Cape Yacht Club	12	12	11	10	10	5	18	11
China	China Team	Qingdao International Yacht Club	11	11	12	12	12	11	9	12

=== Act 4 ===
Act Four was sailed in Valencia, Spain. The Act consisted of a singleround robin of match races. Alinghi won Act 4.

- Act 4 saw the debut of RSA 83, the first IACC boat constructed in Africa, and SUI 75.
- Desafío Español 2007 sailed ESP 67, a rebadged USA 67 from OneWorld's 2003 Louis Vuitton Cup campaign while Mascalzone Latino - Capitalia Team sailed ITA 77, a rebadged USA 77 from Team Dennis Conner's 2003 campaign.
- Team Germany sailed GER 72, which was a rebadged ITA 72 from Mascalzone Latino, while China Team sailed CHN 69 as they had merged with Le Defi and acquired FRA 69.

Team Name	Raced	Won	Lost	Points	Ranking
(Switzerland) Alinghi (SUI 75)	11	11	0	11	1
Team New Zealand (NZL 82)	11	10	1	10	2
(United States) BMW Oracle Racing (USA 76)	11	9	2	9	3
(Italy) Luna Rossa (ITA 74)	11	8	3	8	4
(Sweden) Victory Challenge (SWE 63)	11	6	5	6	5
(Spain) Desafío Español 2007 (ESP 67)	11	6	5	6	6
(France) K Challenge (FRA 60)	11	4	7	4	7
(Italy) Mascalzone Latino - Capitalia Team (ITA 77)	11	4	7	4	8
(Italy) +39 Challenge (ITA 59)	11	4	7	4	9
United Internet Team Germany (GER 72)	11	3	8	3	10
China Team (CHN 69)	11	1	10	1	11
(South Africa) Team Shosholoza (RSA 83)	11	0	11	0	12

	ALI	BMW	+39	TSH	ETNZ	LRS	KCH	VCH	DESP	MLCT	UITG	CHN
ALI		W	W	W	W	W	W	W	W	W	W	W
BMW	L		W	W	L	W	W	W	W	W	W	W
+39	L	L		W	L	L	W	L	L	L	W	W
TSH	L	L	L		L	L	L	L	L	L	L	L
ETNZ	L	W	W	W		W	W	W	W	W	W	W
LRS	L	L	W	W	L		W	W	W	W	W	W
KCH	L	L	L	W	L	L		W	L	W	L	W
VCH	L	L	W	W	L	L	L		W	W	W	W
DESP	L	L	W	W	L	L	W	L		W	W	W
MLCT	L	L	W	W	L	L	L	L	L		W	W
UITG	L	L	L	W	L	L	W	L	L	L		W
CHN	L	L	L	W	L	L	L	L	L	L	L	

=== Act 5 ===
Act Five was sailed in Valencia, Spain. The Act consisted of five fleet races. Luna Rossa won Act 5.

Team Name	Race 1	Race 2	Race 3	Race 4	Race 5	Points	Ranking
(Italy) Luna Rossa (ITA 74)	2nd	6th	6th	1st	4th	46	1
(Switzerland) Alinghi (SUI 75)	3rd	7th	2nd	2nd	5th	46	2
Team New Zealand (NZL 82)	1st	9th	1st	5th	6th	43	3
(United States) BMW Oracle Racing (USA 76)	5th	5th	3rd	3rd	10th	39	4
(Italy) Mascalzone Latino - Capitalia Team (ITA 77)	12th	1st	5th	7th	2nd	38	5
(Sweden) Victory Challenge (SWE 63)	4th	2nd	7th	DSQ	3rd	36	6
(France) K Challenge (FRA 60)	7th	4th	4th	6th	9th	35	7
(Spain) Desafío Español 2007 (ESP 69)	8th	8th	9th	8th	1st	31	8
(Italy) +39 Challenge (ITA 59)	10th	3rd	10th	9th	7th	26	9
United Internet Team Germany (GER 72)	6th	11th	8th	4th	11th	25	10
China Team (CHN 69)	11th	12th	12th	10th	8th	12	11
(South Africa) Team Shosholoza (RSA 83)	9th	10th	11th	11th	12th	12	12

=== Act 6 ===
Act Six was held in Malmö, Skåne, Sweden. The Act consisted of a single round robin of match races. Alinghi won Act 6.

- Victory Challenge switched from SWE 63 to SWE 73, deciding it was better suited to the Swedish conditions

Team Name	Raced	Won	Lost	Points	Ranking
(Switzerland) Alinghi (SUI 75)	11	11	0	11	1
(United States) BMW Oracle Racing (USA 76)	11	10	1	10	2
Team New Zealand (NZL 82)	11	8	3	8	3
(Italy) Luna Rossa (ITA 74)	11	8	3	8	4
(Spain) Desafío Español 2007 (ESP 67)	11	6	5	6	5
(Italy) +39 Challenge (ITA 59)	11	6	5	6	6
(Italy) Mascalzone Latino - Capitalia Team (ITA 77)	11	5	6	5	7
(Sweden) Victory Challenge (SWE 73)	11	4	7	4	8
(France) K Challenge (FRA 60)	11	3	8	3	9
United Internet Team Germany (GER 72)	11	2	9	2	10
(South Africa) Team Shosholoza (RSA 83)	11	2	9	2	11
China Team (CHN 69)	11	1	10	1	12

	ALI	BMW	+39	TSH	ETNZ	LRS	KCH	VCH	DESP	MLCT	UITG	CHN
ALI		W	W	W	W	W	W	W	W	W	W	W
BMW	L		W	W	W	W	W	W	W	W	W	W
+39	L	L		W	W	L	L	W	L	W	W	W
TSH	L	L	L		L	L	L	W	L	L	L	W
ETNZ	L	L	L	W		W	W	W	W	W	W	W
LRS	L	L	W	W	L		W	W	W	W	W	W
KCH	L	L	W	W	L	L		L	L	L	W	L
VCH	L	L	L	L	L	L	W		W	L	W	W
DESP	L	L	W	W	L	L	W	L		W	W	W
MLCT	L	L	L	W	L	L	W	W	L		W	W
UITG	L	L	L	W	L	L	L	L	L	L		W
CHN	L	L	L	L	L	L	W	L	L	L	L	

=== Act 7 ===
Act Seven was held in Malmö, Skåne, Sweden. The Act was to consist of five fleet races, however poor weather meant that the Act was reduced to three races. Alinghi won Act 7.

Team Name	Race 1	Race 2	Race 3	Points	Ranking
(Switzerland) Alinghi (SUI 75)	2nd	4th	1st	32	1
(United States) BMW Oracle Racing (USA 76)	1st	2nd	4th	32	2
(Italy) Luna Rossa (ITA 74)	6th	3rd	2nd	28	3
Team New Zealand (NZL 82)	4th	6th	3rd	26	4
(Spain) Desafío Español 2007 (ESP 67)	3rd	5th	5th	26	5
(France) K Challenge (FRA 60)	10th	1st	9th	19	6
United Internet Team Germany (GER 72)	5th	10th	7th	17	7
(Italy) +39 Challenge (ITA 59)	9th	7th	6th	17	8
(Italy) Mascalzone Latino - Capitalia Team (ITA 77)	8th	8th	11th	12	9
(South Africa) Team Shosholoza (RSA 83)	7th	11th	10th	11	10
(Sweden) Victory Challenge (SWE 73)	12th	9th	8th	10	11
China Team (CHN 69)	11th	12th	12th	4	12

=== Act 8 ===
Act Eight was held in Trapani, Italy. The Act consisted of a single round robin of match races. Alinghi won Act 8.

Team Name	Raced	Won	Lost	Points	Ranking
(Switzerland) Alinghi (SUI 75)	11	9	2	9	1
Team New Zealand (NZL 82)	11	9	2	9	2
(Italy) Luna Rossa (ITA 74)	11	9	2	9	3
(United States) BMW Oracle Racing (USA 76)	11	9	2	9	4
(France) K Challenge (FRA 60)	11	7	4	7	5
(Sweden) Victory Challenge (SWE 63)	11	6	5	6	6
(Italy) +39 Challenge (ITA 59)	11	4	7	4	7
(Spain) Desafío Español 2007 (ESP 67)	11	4	7	4	8
(Italy) Mascalzone Latino - Capitalia Team (ITA 77)	11	3	8	3	9
(South Africa) Team Shosholoza (RSA 83)	11	3	8	3	10
United Internet Team Germany (GER 72)	11	2	9	2	11
China Team (CHN 69)	11	1	10	1	12

	ALI	BMW	+39	TSH	ETNZ	LRS	KCH	VCH	DESP	MLCT	UITG	CHN
ALI		L	W	W	W	W	L	W	W	W	W	W
BMW	L		W	W	L	L	W	W	W	W	W	W
+39	L	L		W	L	L	L	L	W	W	W	L
TSH	DNS	L	L		L	L	W	L	L	L	W	W
ETNZ	L	W	W	W		W	L	W	W	W	W	W
LRS	DNF	W	W	W	L		W	W	W	W	W	W
KCH	W	L	W	DNF	W	DNF		L	W	W	W	W
VCH	L	L	W	W	L	L	W		W	L	W	W
DESP	L	L	L	W	L	L	L	L		W	W	W
MLCT	L	L	L	W	DNF	L	L	W	L		L	W
UITG	L	L	L	L	L	L	L	L	DNF	W		W
CHN	L	L	W	L	L	L	L	DNS	DNF	L	L	

=== Act 9 ===
Act Nine was held in Trapani, Italy. The Act consisted of five fleet races. Alinghi won Act 9.

Team Name	Race 1	Race 2	Race 3	Race 4	Race 5	Points	Ranking
(Switzerland) Alinghi (SUI 75)	3rd	1st	1st	1st	3rd	56	1
(United States) BMW Oracle Racing (USA 76)	1st	2nd	2nd	2nd	2nd	56	2
Team New Zealand (NZL 82)	2nd	3rd	5th	3rd	6th	46	2
(Spain) Desafío Español 2007 (ESP 67)	6th	6th	4th	8th	1st	40	4
(South Africa) Team Shosholoza (RSA 83)	5th	5th	3rd	7th	8th	37	5
(Italy) Luna Rossa (ITA 74)	11th	4th	6th	6th	4th	34	6
(Italy) +39 Challenge (ITA 59)	8th	8th	7th	11th	5th	26	7
(Sweden) Victory Challenge (SWE 63)	10th	11th	8th	5th	7th	24	8
United Internet Team Germany (GER 72)	4th	7th	11th	12th	9th	22	9
(Italy) Mascalzone Latino - Capitalia Team (ITA 77)	12th	10th	9th	4th	11th	19	10
China Team (CHN 69)	9th	9th	12th	9th	10th	16	11
(France) K Challenge (FRA 60)	7th	DNF	10th	10th	DNS	12	12

== 2006 ACC Championship ==
The 2006 ACC Championship was won by Team New Zealand.

Country	Team name	Yacht Club	Act 10	Act 11	Act 12	Points	Ranking
New Zealand	Emirates Team New Zealand	Royal New Zealand Yacht Squadron	3	3	1	32	1
Switzerland	Alinghi	Société Nautique de Genève	4	1	2	32	2
United States	BMW Oracle Racing	Golden Gate Yacht Club	1	4	3	31	3
Italy	Luna Rossa Challenge	Yacht Club Italiano	2	2	4	31	4
Italy	Mascalzone Latino - Capitalia Team	Reale Yacht Club Canottieri Savoia	7	5	6	21	5
Spain	Desafío Español 2007	Real Federación Española de Vela	5	9	5	20	6
South Africa	Team Shosholoza	Royal Cape Yacht Club	8	6	8	17	7
Sweden	Victory Challenge	Gamla Stans Yacht Sällskap	7	10	7	16	8
France	Areva Challenge	Cercle de la Voile de Paris	10	7	9	13	9
Italy	+39 Challenge	Circolo Vela Gargnano	9	8	10	12	10
Germany	United Internet Team Germany	Deutscher Challenger Yacht Club	11	11	11	6	11
China	China Team	Qingdao International Yacht Club	12	12	12	3	12

=== Act 10 ===
Act Ten was sailed in Valencia, Spain. The Act consisted of a singleround robin of match races. BMW Oracle Racing won Act 10.

- Act 10 saw the debut of USA 87, ITA 86 and NZL 84.
- Act 10 saw the introduction of CHN 79, a rebadged FRA 79 from Le Defi's 2003 Louis Vuitton Cup campaign, and ESP 65, formerly USA 65 from OneWorld's 2003 campaign.

Team Name	Raced	Won	Lost	Points	Ranking
(United States) BMW Oracle Racing (USA 87)	11	10	1	10	1
(Italy) Luna Rossa (ITA 86)	11	9	2	9	2
Team New Zealand (NZL 84)	11	9	2	9	3
(Switzerland) Alinghi (SUI 75)	11	9	2	9	4
(Spain) Desafío Español 2007 (ESP 65)	11	6	5	6	5
(Sweden) Victory Challenge (SWE 63)	11	6	5	6	6
(Italy) Mascalzone Latino - Capitalia Team (ITA 77)	11	5	6	5	7
(South Africa) Team Shosholoza (RSA 83)	11	4	7	4	8
(Italy) +39 Challenge (ITA 59)	11	3	8	3	9
(France) Areva Challenge (FRA 60)	11	3	8	3	10
United Internet Team Germany (GER 72)	11	2	9	2	11
China Team (CHN 79)	11	0	11	0	12

	ALI	BMW	+39	TSH	ETNZ	LRS	ARV	VCH	DESP	MLCT	UITG	CHN
ALI		W	W	W	L	L	W	W	W	W	W	W
BMW	L		W	W	W	W	W	W	W	W	W	W
+39	L	L		L	L	L	W	L	L	L	W	W
TSH	L	L	W		L	L	W	L	W	L	L	W
ETNZ	W	L	W	W		L	W	W	W	W	W	W
LRS	W	L	W	W	W		W	W	L	W	W	W
ARV	L	L	L	L	L	L		L	W	L	W	W
VCH	L	L	W	W	L	L	W		L	W	W	W
DESP	L	L	W	L	L	W	L	W		W	W	W
MLCT	L	L	W	W	L	L	W	L	L		W	W
UITG	L	L	L	W	L	L	L	L	L	L		W
CHN	L	L	L	L	L	L	L	L	L	L	L	

=== Act 11 ===
Act Eleven was held in Valencia, Spain. The Act consisted of five fleet races. Alinghi won Act 11.

Team Name	Race 1	Race 2	Race 3	Race 4	Race 5	Points	Ranking
(Switzerland) Alinghi (SUI 75)	6th	1st	1st	3rd	1st	53	1
(Italy) Luna Rossa (ITA 86)	10th	2nd	3rd	1st	4th	45	2
Team New Zealand (NZL 84)	4th	7th	2nd	5th	2nd	45	3
(United States) BMW Oracle Racing (USA 87)	9th	6th	4th	2nd	3rd	41	4
(Italy) Mascalzone Latino - Capitalia Team (ITA 77)	2nd	10th	5th	4th	5th	39	5
(South Africa) Team Shosholoza (RSA 83)	5th	5th	6th	8th	8th	33	6
(France) Areva Challenge (FRA 60)	7th	4th	8th	7th	7th	32	7
(Italy) +39 Challenge (ITA 59)	3rd	12th	7th	6th	6th	31	8
(Spain) Desafío Español 2007 (ESP 65)	8th	3rd	10th	9th	9th	26	9
(Sweden) Victory Challenge (SWE 63)	1st	8th	11th	10th	11th	24	10
United Internet Team Germany (GER 72)	11th	11th	9th	11th	10th	13	11
China Team (CHN 79)	12th	9th	12th	DNF	DNS	6	12

=== Act 12 ===
Act Twelve was sailed in Valencia, Spain. The Act consisted of a singleround robin of match races plus three divisions of knock out finals. Emirates Team New Zealand won Act 12.

- Act 12 saw the introduction of ESP 88.

Team Name	Raced	Won	Lost	Points	Ranking
Team New Zealand (NZL 84)	11	11	0	11	1
(Italy) Luna Rossa (ITA 86)	11	10	1	10	2
(Switzerland) Alinghi (SUI 75)	11	8	3	8	3
(United States) BMW Oracle Racing (USA 87)	11	8	3	8	4
(Spain) Desafío Español 2007 (ESP 88)	11	7	4	7	5
(Italy) Mascalzone Latino - Capitalia Team (ITA 77)	11	6	5	6	6
(Sweden) Victory Challenge (SWE 63)	11	6	5	6	7
(South Africa) Team Shosholoza (RSA 83)	11	3	8	3	8
(France) Areva Challenge (FRA 60)	11	3	8	3	9
(Italy) +39 Challenge (ITA 59)	11	3	8	3	10
United Internet Team Germany (GER 72)	11	1	10	1	11
China Team (CHN 79)	11	0	11	0	12

	ALI	BMW	+39	TSH	ETNZ	LRS	ARV	VCH	DESP	MLCT	UITG	CHN
ALI		W	W	W	L	L	W	L	W	W	W	W
BMW	L		W	W	L	L	W	W	W	W	W	W
+39	L	L		W	L	L	L	L	L	L	W	W
TSH	L	L	L		L	L	W	L	L	L	W	W
ETNZ	W	W	W	W		W	W	W	W	W	W	W
LRS	W	W	W	W	L		W	W	W	W	W	W
ARV	L	L	W	L	L	L		L	L	L	W	W
VCH	W	L	W	W	L	L	W		L	L	W	W
DESP	L	L	W	W	L	L	W	W		W	W	W
MLCT	L	L	W	W	L	L	W	W	L		W	W
UITG	L	L	L	L	L	L	L	L	L	L		W
CHN	L	L	L	L	L	L	L	L	L	L	L	

==== Division 1 ====
Semi-finals
Team New Zealand	2
(United States) BMW Oracle Racing	1
(Italy) Luna Rossa	0
(Switzerland) Alinghi	2

Final
1st and 2nd place
Team New Zealand	2
(Switzerland) Alinghi	1
Third place
3rd and 4th place
(United States) BMW Oracle Racing	2
(Italy) Luna Rossa	0

==== Division 2 ====
Semi-finals
(Spain) Desafío Español 2007	2
(South Africa) Team Shosholoza	1
(Italy) Mascalzone Latino - Capitalia Team	2
(Sweden) Victory Challenge	0

Final
5th and 6th place
(Spain) Desafío Español 2007	2
(Italy) Mascalzone Latino - Capitalia Team	0
Third place
7th and 8th place
(South Africa) Team Shosholoza	1
(Sweden) Victory Challenge	2

==== Division 3 ====
Semi-finals
(France) Areva Challenge	2
China Team	0
(Italy) +39 Challenge	2
United Internet Team Germany	0

Final
9th and 10th place
(France) Areva Challenge	2
(Italy) +39 Challenge	0
Third place
11th and 12th place
China Team	0
United Internet Team Germany	2

== 2007 season ==
No ACC Championship was awarded in 2007, instead the focus was on the 2007 Louis Vuitton Cup and the 2007 America's Cup.

=== Act 13 ===
Act Thirteen was held in Valencia, Spain. The Act consisted of seven fleet races. Alinghi won Act 13.

- Act 13 was originally to be titled Act 14 due to the desire to avoid having a "thirteenth race"; however the Act was later retitled Act 13 for simplicity's sake.
- Act 13 saw the introduction of SUI 91, ITA 94, FRA 93, ITA 85, ESP 97, ITA 99, GER 89, CHN 95 and SWE 96.

Team Name	Race 1	Race 2	Race 3	Race 4	Race 5	Race 6	Race 7	Points	Ranking
(Switzerland) Alinghi (SUI 91)	4th	1st	1st	1st	3rd	2nd	1st	78	1
Team New Zealand (NZL 84)	5th	3rd	4th	5th	1st	3rd	6th	64	2
(Italy) Mascalzone Latino - Capitalia Team (ITA 99)	3rd	6th	5th	2nd	4th	5th	3rd	63	3
(Italy) Luna Rossa (ITA 94)	7th	5th	2nd	3rd	2nd	8th	4th	60	4
(United States) BMW Oracle Racing (USA 87)	1st	4th	7th	4th	10th	6th	2nd	57	5
(Spain) Desafío Español 2007 (ESP 97)	8th	2nd	3rd	9th	6th	1st	7th	55	6
(South Africa) Team Shosholoza (RSA 83)	2nd	8th	10th	7th	5th	7th	9th	43	7
(Sweden) Victory Challenge (SWE 96)	12th	11th	6th	8th	7th	4th	8th	35	8
(France) Areva Challenge (FRA 93)	9th	10th	8th	10th	8th	10th	5th	31	9
United Internet Team Germany (GER 89)	6th	9th	DSQ	6th	9th	9th	10th	29	10
(Italy) +39 Challenge (ITA 85)	10th	7th	5th*	DNS	DNS	DNS	DNS	17	11
China Team (CHN 95)	11th	12th	9th	11th	11th	11th	11th	15	12

*+39 Challenge awarded redress after collision.

=== Bonus points ===
Each challenger was awarded between 1 and 4 bonus points to take into the 2007 Louis Vuitton Cup based on their performances in the last Ten Acts. Between 11 and 1 points were awarded to each team per Act based on the final position the syndicate when Alinghi was excluded. For 2006 Acts the points were doubled and the points were tripled for 2007 Acts. The 2004 Acts were not worth any points. Emirates Team New Zealand topped the table and took the maximum four bonus points into the Louis Vuitton Cup.

Team Name	Act 4	Act 5	Act 6	Act 7	Act 8	Act 9	Act 10	Act 11	Act 12	Act 13	Points	Ranking	Bonus Pts
Team New Zealand	11	10	10	9	11	10	20	22	22	33	158	1	4
(United States) BMW Oracle Racing	10	9	11	11	11	11	22	18	20	24	147	2	3
(Italy) Luna Rossa	9	11	10	10	11	7	20	22	18	27	145	3	3
(Spain) Desafío Español 2007	8	5	8	9	6	9	16	8	16	21	106	4	3
(Italy) Mascalzone Latino - Capitalia Team	6	8	6	4	4	3	12	16	14	30	103	5	2
(Sweden) Victory Challenge	8	7	5	2	7	5	16	6	12	15	83	6	2
(South Africa) Team Shosholoza	1	2	3	3	4	8	10	14	10	18	73	7	2
(France) Areva Challenge	6	6	4	7	8	1	8	12	8	12	72	8	1
(Italy) +39 Challenge	6	4	8	6	6	6	8	10	6	6*	66	9	2*
United Internet Team Germany	3	3	3	6	2	4	4	4	4	9	42	10	1
China Team	2	2	1	1	1	2	2	2	2	3	18	11	1

*+39 Challenge awarded redress after collision in Act 13.
