= 2007 Louis Vuitton Cup =

Louis Vuitton Cup held in Valencia, Spain

7th Louis Vuitton Cup
Event information
- Type: Challenge race for America's Cup
- Dates: April 25, 2007 – June 11, 2007
- Host city: Valencia, Spain
- Boats: Emirates Team New Zealand; BMW Oracle Racing (United States); Luna Rossa Challenge (Italy); Desafío Español 2007 (Spain); Victory Challenge (Sweden); Mascalzone Latino - Capitalia Team (Italy); Team Shosholoza (South Africa); Areva Challenge (France) +39 Challenge; United Internet Team Germany; China Team
- Website: 32nd America's Cup

Results
- Winner: Emirates Team New Zealand

Succession
- Previous: 2003 Louis Vuitton Cup
- Next: 2013 Louis Vuitton Cup

The 2007 Louis Vuitton Cup held in Valencia, Spain, from April 16 to June 6 was the event used to select the challenger for the 2007 America's Cup. Eleven potential challengers competed in the competition which consisted of two round robins, two semi-finals and a final. The winner was Emirates Team New Zealand, who challenged the defender Alinghi in June 2007 for the America's Cup.

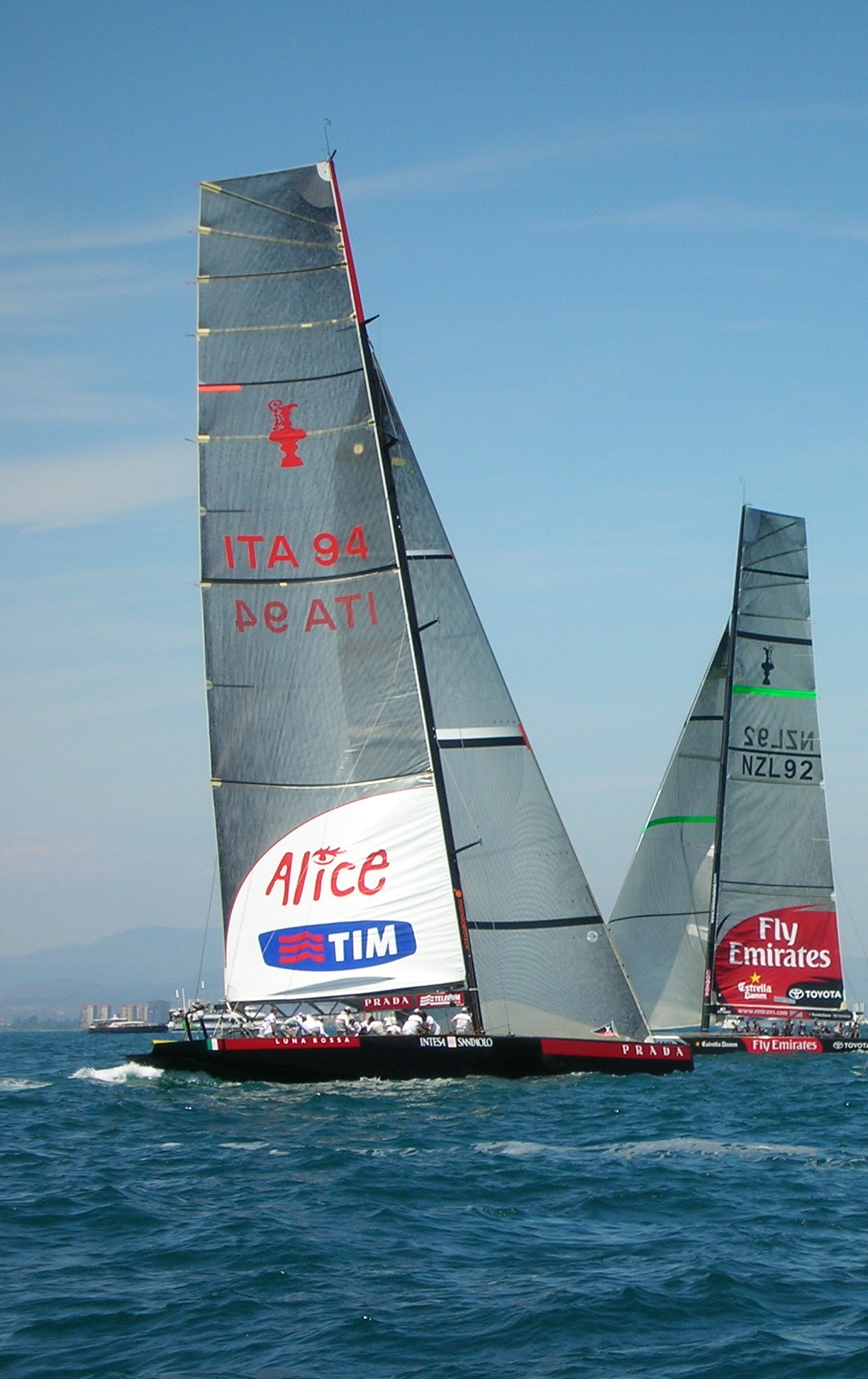
Luna Rossa Challenge (left) and Emirates Team New Zealand (right) during the finals of the 2007 Louis Vuitton Cup (start of race 3)

== Teams ==
Team name	Yacht club	Country	External link	Skipper/Helmsman
Emirates Team New Zealand	Royal New Zealand Yacht Squadron	New Zealand		Dean Barker
BMW Oracle Racing	Golden Gate Yacht Club	United States		Chris Dickson
Luna Rossa Challenge	Yacht Club Italiano	Italy		Francesco de Angelis; James Spithill
Desafío Español 2007	Real Federación Española de Vela	Spain		Karol Jabłoński
Victory Challenge	Gamla Stans Yacht Sällskap	Sweden		Magnus Holmberg
Mascalzone Latino - Capitalia Team	Reale Yacht Club Canottieri Savoia	Italy		Vasco Vascotto
Team Shosholoza	Royal Cape Yacht Club	South Africa		Mark Sadler; Ian Ainslie
Areva Challenge	Cercle de la Voile de Paris	France		Thierry Peponnet
+39 Challenge	Circolo Vela Gargnano	Italy		Iain Percy
United Internet Team Germany	Deutscher Challenger Yacht Club	Germany		Jesper Bank
China Team	Qingdao International Yacht Club	China		Pierre Mas

=== Team New Zealand ===
Managed by Grant Dalton and skippered by Dean Barker, the crew included Terry Hutchinson; navigator Kevin Hall; strategist Ray Davies; Adam Beashel; Barry Mckay; Tony Rae; Don Cowie; Chris Ward; Grant Loretz; Robert Salthouse; James Dagg; Rob Waddell; Andrew Hemmings; Jono McBeth; Matt Mason; Richard Meacham and Jeremy Lomas.

Ben Ainslie and Kelvin Harrap sailed the trial boat.

=== BMW Oracle Racing ===
Skippered by Chris Dickson, the crew included Gavin Brady, Phil Jameson, Paul Westlake, Scott Crawford, Alberto Barovier, Brad Webb, Brian MacInnes, Joe Spooner, Ross Halcrow, Robbie Naismith, Bertrand Pacé, Craig Monk, Carl Williams, Peter Isler and owner Larry Ellison.

=== Luna Rossa Challenge ===
Luna Rossa Challenge was led by Francesco de Angelis and helmsman James Spithill. The crew included Peter Gilmour, Francesco Bruni, mid-bowman Max Sirena, Emanuele Marino, Manuel Modena, Marco Montis, Benjamin Durham, Andy Horton, Michele Cannoni, Gilberto Nobili, Joey Newton, Shannon Falcone, Christian Kamp, Romolo Ranieri, Emanuele Marino, Andrew Taylor, Matteo Plazzi, Simone de Mari, Massimo Gherarducci, Paolo Bassani, Alan Smith, and Olympians Torben Grael, Philippe Presti, Michele Ivaldi, Magnus Augustson and Charles and Jonathan McKee.

=== Desafío Español 2007 ===
Skippered by Luis Doreste, the boat was helmed by Karol Jabłoński and John Cutler was the teams tactician and technical director. The team was coached by Paul Cayard.

=== Victory Challenge ===
Magnus Holmberg skippered Victory Challenge. The afterguard included Stefan Rahn, Santiago Lange, Thierry Fouchier, and Morgan Larson. The crew also included six members of the former GBR Challenge; traveller/strategist Neal McDonald, Simon Fisher, David Carr, Nik Pearson, Richard Sydenham and Ian Weighell. Jeremy Scantlebury was the sailing team manager.

=== Mascalzone Latino ===
Vasco Vascotto was the skipper for Mascalzone Latino, which included helmsman Flavio Favini, Cameron Dunn, Jes Gram-Hansen, Andrea Pavan, Chris Dougall, Pierluigi De Felice, Giuseppe Brizzi, Davide Scarpa, Nacho Postigo, Giulio Giovanella and funder Vincenzo Onorato.

=== Team Shosholoza ===
South Africa's first challenge, Team Shosholoza was skippered by Mark Sadler and Ian Ainslie. The crew included Italians Paolo Cian and Tommaso Chieffi.

=== Areva Challenge ===
Managed by Dawn Riley, Areva Challenge was led by Thierry Peponnet and included Sebastien Col, Tanguy Cariou, Frederic Guilmin, Jean François Cuzon, Jim Turner, and Wade Morgan.

=== +39 Challenge ===
From Italy, +39 Challenge included non-sailing skipper Luca Devoti, helmsman Iain Percy, and other Olympic competitors such as Rafael Trujillo and Ian Walker.

The rest of the crew was navigator Bruno Zirilli; afterguard Andrew Simpson; traveller Gabriele Bruni; runner Anthony Nossiter; trimmers Stefano Rizzi and Christian Scherrer; grinders Michele Gnutti, Chris Brittle and Pawel Bielecki; mast Alejandro Colla; mast/pitman Massimo Galli; sewerman Piero Romeo; mid-bowman Corrado Rossignoli; Andy Fethers; and bowman Jacek Wisoski.

=== Team Germany ===
United Internet Team Germany was skippered by Jesper Bank and included America's Cup veteran David Dellenbaugh.

=== China Team ===
Pierre Mas was the skipper of China Team which had an alliance with Le Défi. Only two of the crew were Chinese.

== Round robin ==
Round robin 2 was completed on May 9, 2007. Teams had accrued bonus points based on their results in the Louis Vuitton Acts which took place in the preceding years. For the round-robin races, two points were awarded for a win and zero for a defeat. The first four boats then progressed to the semi-finals stage of the Louis Vuitton Cup and the remainder were eliminated. As winner of the round-robin events Emirates Team New Zealand won the right to choose their opponent.

Team name	Races	Won	Bonus pts.	RR1 pts.	RR2 pts.	Total pts.	Ranking
Emirates Team New Zealand	20	17	4	14	20	38	1
BMW Oracle Racing	20	17	3	18	16	37	2
Luna Rossa Challenge	20	16	3	16	16	35	3
Desafío Español 2007	20	13	3	14	12	29	4
Victory Challenge	20	12	2	12	12	26	5
Mascalzone Latino - Capitalia Team	20	10	2	12	8	22	6
Team Shosholoza	20	9	2	10	8	20	7
Areva Challenge	20	8	1	8	8	17	8
+39 Challenge	20	5	2	4	6	12	9
United Internet Team Germany	20	2	1	2	2	5	10
China Team	20	1	1	0	2	3	11

=== Round robin 1 ===
The 2007 Louis Vuitton Cup started slowly with all races postponed for the first four days of competition due to light and variable winds. There were rumors that BMW Oracle was planning on rotating the crew off the boat because they were running out of stories to tell as they sat in the boat waiting for wind. To entertain fans, some teams came up with interesting stunts. For instance, United Internet Germany came up with a way to wakeboard, by having their largest sail trimmers pull on the wakeboarder using the jib trimming system. +39, an Italian challenger, used the windless days off to continue making repairs to their mast, which shattered in a starboard-port situation with Internet Team Germany two weeks earlier, and completed mast repairs by the time racing had commenced.

The highlights for the week were not on the water, but rather off it. The Measurement Committee released the final rule interpretations. The rules state that any cup team can request an interpretation and remain anonymous. Additionally, any interpretation by the committee stays private for 6 months. Every cup team and all the media was trying to find out more about two of the final interpretations. It seems that one boat may have found a significant advantage, but everyone would have to wait until the end of the Cup to find out who and exactly what had happened.

Racing was scheduled to start on April 16, 2007, but did not get underway until April 20, 2007.

Date	Team 1	Team 2	Winner	Delta	Timings
April 20, 2007	Mascalzone Latino - Capitalia Team	Emirates Team New Zealand	Mascalzone Latino - Capitalia Team	0:15	
	+39 Challenge	Areva Challenge	Areva Challenge	1:09	
	United Internet Team Germany	BMW Oracle Racing	BMW Oracle Racing	2:00	
	Team Shosholoza	Victory Challenge	Victory Challenge	0:46	
	China Team	Luna Rossa Challenge	Luna Rossa Challenge	2:07	
	Desafío Español	+39 Challenge	Desafío Español	2:45	
	Mascalzone Latino - Capitalia Team	Areva Challenge	Mascalzone Latino - Capitalia Team	1:41	
	United Internet Team Germany	Team Shosholoza	Team Shosholoza	1:10	
	China Team	BMW Oracle Racing	BMW Oracle Racing	4:36	
	Victory Challenge	Luna Rossa Challenge	Luna Rossa Challenge	1:07	

All the scheduled races for April 21, 2007, were postponed by the race committee to April 22, 2007, due to light winds.

Date	Team 1	Team 2	Winner	Delta	Timings
April 22, 2007	Luna Rossa Challenge	United Internet Team Germany	Luna Rossa Challenge	0:50	
	Victory Challenge	China Team	Victory Challenge	3:50	
	BMW Oracle Racing	Team Shosholoza	BMW Oracle Racing	0:47	
	Areva Challenge	Desafío Español 2007	Areva Challenge	2:06	
	Emirates Team New Zealand	+39 Challenge	Emirates Team New Zealand	2:41	

Some of the scheduled races for April 22, 2007, and all of the races on April 23, 2007, were postponed by the race committee until April 24, 2007, due to poor wind conditions.

Date	Team 1	Team 2	Winner	Delta	Timings
April 24, 2007	United Internet Team Germany	China Team	United Internet Team Germany	4:01	
	Team Shosholoza	Luna Rossa Challenge	Team Shosholoza	0:36	
	Victory Challenge	BMW Oracle Racing	BMW Oracle Racing	1:18	
	Areva Challenge	Emirates Team New Zealand	Emirates Team New Zealand	1:55	
	Desafío Español 2007	Mascalzone Latino - Capitalia Team	Desafío Español 2007	0:39	
	China Team	Team Shosholoza	Team Shosholoza	2:05	
	Emirates Team New Zealand	Desafío Español 2007	Emirates Team New Zealand	1:12	
	Victory Challenge	United Internet Team Germany	Victory Challenge	0:56	
	Luna Rossa Challenge	BMW Oracle Racing	BMW Oracle Racing	0:06	
	+39 Challenge	Mascalzone Latino - Capitalia Team	Mascalzone Latino - Capitalia Team	1:12	
April 25, 2007	China Team	Desafío Español 2007	Desafío Español 2007	2:01	
	Team Shosholoza	Emirates Team New Zealand	Emirates Team New Zealand	1:23	
	Areva Challenge	Luna Rossa Challenge	Luna Rossa Challenge	0:33	
	United Internet Team Germany	Mascalzone Latino - Capitalia Team	Mascalzone Latino - Capitalia Team	0:24	
	+39 Challenge	Victory Challenge	Victory Challenge	0:55	
	BMW Oracle Racing	Areva Challenge	BMW Oracle Racing	2:54	
	Luna Rossa Challenge	+39 Challenge	Luna Rossa Challenge	1:22	
	United Internet Team Germany	Emirates Team New Zealand	Emirates Team New Zealand	1:03	
	Mascalzone Latino - Capitalia Team	China Team	Mascalzone Latino - Capitalia Team	Withdrew	-
	Desafío Español 2007	Team Shosholoza	Desafío Español 2007	0:57	
April 26, 2007	Victory Challenge	Areva Challenge	Victory Challenge	0:05	
	BMW Oracle Racing	+39 Challenge	BMW Oracle Racing	2:14	
	Desafío Español 2007	United Internet Team Germany	Desafío Español 2007	0:35	
	Mascalzone Latino - Capitalia Team	Team Shosholoza	Mascalzone Latino - Capitalia Team	1:56	
	China Team	Emirates Team New Zealand	Emirates Team New Zealand	Withdrew	-
	Desafío Español 2007	Victory Challenge	Desafío Español 2007	0:35	
	Emirates Team New Zealand	Luna Rossa Challenge	Luna Rossa Challenge	0:48	
	Areva Challenge	China Team	Areva Challenge	Withdrew	-
	Team Shosholoza	+39 Challenge	Team Shosholoza	0:26	
	BMW Oracle Racing	Mascalzone Latino - Capitalia Team	BMW Oracle Racing	1:38	
April 27, 2007	Areva Challenge	United Internet Team Germany	Areva Challenge	1:09	
	+39 Challenge	China Team	+39 Challenge	Withdrew	-
	+39 Challenge	United Internet Team Germany	+39 Challenge	0:57	
	Team Shosholoza	Areva Challenge	Team Shosholoza	DNF	

Some of the scheduled races for April 27, 2007, were postponed by the race committee until April 28, 2007, due to very light and variable winds.

Date	Team 1	Team 2	Winner	Delta	Timings
April 28, 2007	Luna Rossa Challenge	Mascalzone Latino - Capitalia Team	Luna Rossa Challenge	0:49	
	Emirates Team New Zealand	Victory Challenge	Emirates Team New Zealand	1:42	
	BMW Oracle Racing	Desafío Español 2007	Desafío Español 2007	1:00	
	Mascalzone Latino - Capitalia Team	Victory Challenge	Victory Challenge	0:28	
	Luna Rossa Challenge	Desafío Español 2007	Luna Rossa Challenge	0:37	
	Emirates Team New Zealand	BMW Oracle Racing	BMW Oracle Racing	0:38	

=== Round robin 2 ===
The following week brought a little wind, and although most days the race committee postponed races for wind, they were able to race most days. Although many of the results were easy to predict, a few upsets occurred in the first round robin. In the first race of the first flight, the powerhouse from New Zealand lost to the Mascalzone Latino, an Italian challenger. In the fourth flight, Shosholoza, the underdog from South Africa, beat Luna Rossa from Italy, a three time cup veteran.

Due to the lack of wind the first week, the second round robin began without any lay days after the first. The first surprise of the second round robin was by China Team, who beat the favored BMW Oracle Racing team by 3 minutes and 15 seconds, the only team yet to achieve a win against BMW Oracle. The win was due to a delamination on the American team's headsail foil which caused the headsail to become partially detached making the sail totally ineffective for part of the race. Also, the Americans gave their best crew members a holiday and sailed against the Chinese with a less experienced crew. The following day several of the China Team members arrived at the compound with bald heads. Reportedly they bet one another that if they beat the Americans, they would shave their heads.

The final round of round robin competition featured a race for the top place. Both Emirates Team New Zealand and the United States had lost one race in the first round and zero in the second round robin. Because of Bonus Points from previous acts, New Zealand had a one-point advantage over the United States. Each race counted as two points, so a win for either team would result in the first-place finish in the round robins. The final race was expected to be an exciting match between the two. However, after the start, the race quickly became disappointing for BMW Oracle fans, with New Zealand stretching their early lead. The result was New Zealand winning the round robin, and was able to choose its opponent for the subsequent semi-final round.

Date	Team 1	Team 2	Winner	Delta	Timings
April 29, 2007	BMW Oracle Racing	United Internet Team Germany	BMW Oracle Racing	3:17	
	Victory Challenge	Team Shosholoza	Victory Challenge	0:52	
	Luna Rossa Challenge	China Team	Luna Rossa Challenge	2:57	

Some of the scheduled races for April 29, 2007 were postponed by the race committee until April 30, 2007, due to lack of wind.

Date	Team 1	Team 2	Winner	Delta	Timings
April 30, 2007	Team Shosholoza	United Internet Team Germany	Team Shosholoza	1:23	
	BMW Oracle Racing	China Team	China Team	3:15	
	Luna Rossa Challenge	Victory Challenge	Luna Rossa Challenge	0:27	
	+39 Challenge	Desafío Español 2007	Desafío Español 2007	0:10	
	Areva Challenge	Mascalzone Latino - Capitalia Team	Areva Challenge	2:06	
	Emirates Team New Zealand	Mascalzone Latino - Capitalia Team	Emirates Team New Zealand	0:25	
	Areva Challenge	+39 Challenge	Areva Challenge	1:11	

All races scheduled for May 1 were postponed to May 2 due to excessive wind.

Date	Team 1	Team 2	Winner	Delta	Timings
May 2, 2007	Desafío Español 2007	Areva Challenge	Desafío Español 2007	0:30	
	+39 Challenge	Emirates Team New Zealand	Emirates Team New Zealand	0:45	
	United Internet Team Germany	Luna Rossa Challenge	Luna Rossa Challenge	1:02	
	China Team	Victory Challenge	Victory Challenge	11:49	
	Team Shosholoza	BMW Oracle Racing	BMW Oracle Racing	0:43	
	Mascalzone Latino - Capitalia Team	Desafío Español 2007	A resail was ordered by the race committee	-	-
	Emirates Team New Zealand	Areva Challenge	Emirates Team New Zealand	0:59	
	China Team	United Internet Team Germany	United Internet Team Germany	2:16	
	Luna Rossa Challenge	Team Shosholoza	Luna Rossa Challenge	0:25	
	BMW Oracle Racing	Victory Challenge	BMW Oracle Racing	0:14	

All races scheduled for May 3 were postponed to May 4 due to thunder storms.

Date	Team 1	Team 2	Winner	Delta	Timings
May 4, 2007	United Internet Team Germany	Victory Challenge	Victory Challenge	1:18	
	BMW Oracle Racing	Luna Rossa Challenge	BMW Oracle Racing	0:19	
	Mascalzone Latino - Capitalia Team	+39 Challenge	Mascalzone Latino - Capitalia Team	2:07	
	Team Shosholoza	China Team	Team Shosholoza	2:01	
	Desafío Español 2007	Emirates Team New Zealand	Emirates Team New Zealand	0:43	
	Luna Rossa Challenge	Areva Challenge	Luna Rossa Challenge	1:16	
	Mascalzone Latino - Capitalia Team	United Internet Team Germany	Mascalzone Latino - Capitalia Team	0:34	
	Victory Challenge	+39 Challenge	Victory Challenge	1:03	
	Desafío Español 2007	China Team	Desafío Español 2007	3:45	
	Emirates Team New Zealand	Team Shosholoza	Emirates Team New Zealand	0:29	
May 5, 2007	China Team	Mascalzone Latino - Capitalia Team	Mascalzone Latino - Capitalia Team	2:22	
	Team Shosholoza	Desafío Español 2007	Desafío Español 2007	0:47	
	Emirates Team New Zealand	United Internet Team Germany	Emirates Team New Zealand	2:07	
	Areva Challenge	BMW Oracle Racing	BMW Oracle Racing	1:28	
	+39 Challenge	Luna Rossa Challenge	Luna Rossa Challenge	1:04	
	Mascalzone Latino - Capitalia Team	Desafío Español 2007	Desafío Español 2007	0:35	
May 6, 2007	United Internet Team Germany	Desafío Español 2007	Desafío Español 2007	1:08	
	Team Shosholoza	Mascalzone Latino - Capitalia Team	Team Shosholoza	0:06	
	Emirates Team New Zealand	China Team	Emirates Team New Zealand	3:02	
	Areva Challenge	Victory Challenge	Victory Challenge	0:35	
	+39 Challenge	BMW Oracle Racing	BMW Oracle Racing	0:53	
May 7, 2007	+39 Challenge	Team Shosholoza	+39 Challenge	0:50	
	China Team	Areva Challenge	Areva Challenge	3:03	
	Mascalzone Latino - Capitalia Team	BMW Oracle Racing	BMW Oracle Racing	0:57	
	Victory Challenge	Desafío Español 2007	Victory Challenge	0:07	
	Luna Rossa Challenge	Emirates Team New Zealand	Emirates Team New Zealand	0:36	
May 8, 2007	China Team	+39 Challenge	+39 Challenge	1:57	
	United Internet Team Germany	Areva Challenge	Areva Challenge	0:35	
	Mascalzone Latino - Capitalia Team	Luna Rossa Challenge	Luna Rossa Challenge	0:07	
	Victory Challenge	Emirates Team New Zealand	Emirates Team New Zealand	0:34	
	Desafío Español 2007	BMW Oracle Racing	BMW Oracle Racing	0:55	
May 9, 2007	Victory Challenge	Mascalzone Latino - Capitalia Team	Mascalzone Latino - Capitalia Team	0:38	
	Desafío Español 2007	Luna Rossa Challenge	Luna Rossa Challenge	1:54	
	BMW Oracle Racing	Emirates Team New Zealand	Emirates Team New Zealand	1:34	
	United Internet Team Germany	+39 Challenge	+39 Challenge	0:30	
	Areva Challenge	Team Shosholoza	Team Shosholoza	0:14	

== Knock-out stage ==
Semi-finals
Emirates Team New Zealand	5
(Spain) Desafío Español 2007	2
(Italy) Luna Rossa Challenge	5
(United States) BMW Oracle Racing	1

Final
Emirates Team New Zealand	5
(Italy) Luna Rossa Challenge	0

=== Semi-finals ===
As winner of the round-robin events Emirates Team New Zealand won the right to choose their opponent in the semi-finals and chose Desafío Español 2007. Hence BMW Oracle Racing raced against Luna Rossa Challenge in the other semi-final. The first team in each semi-final to win 5 races then qualified for the finals of the Louis Vuitton Cup.

Each pairing had raced against each other twice in the preceding round-robin events.

In their previous meetings, Emirates Team New Zealand had a 2–0 record against Desafío Español 2007 with winning margins of 1:12 and 0:43. In their semi-final competition Emirates Team New Zealand always led at the 1st mark and beat Desafío Español 2007 5–2, advancing to the finals.

Likewise, BMW Oracle Racing had a 2–0 record against Luna Rossa Challenge with winning margins of 0:06 and 0:19 but were comprehensively beaten 1–5 by Luna Rossa Challenge in their semi-final. Superior tactics by Luna Rossa Challenge in the pre-start sequences were a significant factor in their semi-final win. Luna Rossa Challenge advanced to face Emirates Team New Zealand in the finals.

Date	Team 1	Team 2	Winner	Delta	Score	Timings	Race summary
May 14, 2007	BMW Oracle Racing	Luna Rossa Challenge	Luna Rossa Challenge	2:19	0–1		Teams split tacks from the start and sailed to opposite sides of the race course. For most of the race the boats sailed well apart on very different courses but LRC took much better advantage of very variable wind patterns to win.
May 14, 2007	Desafío Español 2007	Emirates Team New Zealand	Emirates Team New Zealand	0:43	0–1		ETNZ won the start and sailed a defensive race keeping a loose cover on DE2007 throughout the race.
May 15, 2007	Emirates Team New Zealand	Desafío Español 2007	Emirates Team New Zealand	0:40	2–0		ETNZ won the start and easily controlled the race throughout.
May 15, 2007	Luna Rossa Challenge	BMW Oracle Racing	BMW Oracle Racing	0:13	1–1		LRC was again strong in the pre-start manoeuvres, won the start and lead throughout until the last leg. A tense struggle resulted on the last downwind leg to the finish resulting in a win for BOR.
May 16, 2007	Desafío Español 2007	Emirates Team New Zealand	Desafío Español 2007	1:14	1–2		ETNZ incurred a penalty by not keeping clear when DE2007 was executing a gybe during the pre-start engagement. DE2007 lead at every mark and increased their lead on the final leg to the finish
May 16, 2007	BMW Oracle Racing	Luna Rossa Challenge	Luna Rossa Challenge	0:31	1–2		LRC again won the start and were 29 seconds ahead at the first mark and 49 seconds ahead at the final mark. BOR narrowed the gap slightly on the last leg race to the finish line.
May 18, 2007	Emirates Team New Zealand	Desafío Español 2007	Emirates Team New Zealand	0:42	3–1		ETNZ won the start and extended their lead as the race progressed.
May 18, 2007	Luna Rossa Challenge	BMW Oracle Racing	Luna Rossa Challenge	0:23	3–1		LRC lead the race at each mark through to the finish.
May 19, 2007	Desafío Español 2007	Emirates Team New Zealand	Emirates Team New Zealand	1:49	1–4		DE2007 was ahead at the start but a small wind-shift gave the advantage to ETNZ who extended their lead through to the finish.
May 19, 2007	BMW Oracle Racing	Luna Rossa Challenge	Luna Rossa Challenge	1:57	1–4		LRC won two penalties against BOR during the pre-start. The first a 'port and starboard' incident. The second penalty was given when BOR was bearing away and their stern touched LRC.
May 20, 2007	Emirates Team New Zealand	Desafío Español 2007	Desafío Español 2007	0:15	2–4		Teams split tacks away from each other at the start. DE2007 narrowly lead when they came back together again and it was an extremely close race all the way to the finish.
May 20, 2007	Luna Rossa Challenge	BMW Oracle Racing	Luna Rossa Challenge	0:33	5–1		BOR changed helmsmen for this final race but LRC were easily fastest away at the start and lead at each mark through to the finish. LRC qualified for the LVC final and BOR were eliminated.
May 23, 2007	Desafío Español 2007	Emirates Team New Zealand	Emirates Team New Zealand	1:18	2–5		Race sailed in winds approaching 20 kts. ETNZ lead over the start line and extended their lead through to the finish. ETNZ qualified for the finals of the LVC and DE2007 were eliminated.

=== Final ===
The finals of the 2007 Louis Vuitton Cup pitted Luna Rossa Challenge against Emirates Team New Zealand. Both boats had decisive results in the semi-finals, where Luna Rossa Challenge defeated BMW Oracle Racing 5–1, and Emirates Team New Zealand defeated Desafío Español 2007 5–2.

The two teams raced against each other in each of the two round robins. Luna Rossa Challenge won their race in round robin 1 on 26 April 2007 by 48 seconds. Emirates Team New Zealand won their race in round robin 2 on 7 May 2007 by 36 seconds.

Prior to the final, expert commentators were fairly unanimous that Emirates Team New Zealand were in top form but Luna Rossa Challenge had improved since the round robins as evidenced by their comprehensive beating of BMW Oracle Racing, one of the favourites, in their semi-final. In the best of 9 race final Emirates Team New Zealand beat Luna Rossa Challenge 5–0. However to put this into context, Luna Rossa Challenge 'worst' defeat was in race 3 when Emirates Team New Zealand were only 0:1:38 seconds faster in a race lasting 1:35:37 i.e. a 1.71% performance advantage. In the other 4 races the performance margin was even smaller.

Luna Rossa Challenge won the toss prior to the first race of the final which gave them the advantage of entering the starting area from the "yellow" side.

In the results tables below, the team with the advantage of entering the starting area from the yellow side (entering from the right-hand side on starboard tack) is marked with. This is decided for the first race by the toss of a coin; then the advantage of starting from the yellow side alternates race by race.

Date	Team 1	Team 2	Winner	Delta	Score	Timings	Race summary
June 1, 2007	Emirates Team New Zealand (NZL-92)	Luna Rossa Challenge (ITA-94)	Emirates Team New Zealand	0:08	1–0		ETNZ led by 12 seconds at the 1st mark and only 8 seconds at the finish. A quote from the LVC organisers press release read, "high-quality match racing of the highest order, the outcome of the race decided on the tiniest of details."
June 2, 2007	Luna Rossa Challenge (ITA-94)	Emirates Team New Zealand (NZL-92)	Emirates Team New Zealand	0:40	0–2		ETNZ crossed the start line at full speed. LRC were squeezed to the right and forced to tack at slow speed away from ETNZ who then controlled the race through to the finish.
June 3, 2007	Emirates Team New Zealand (NZL-92)	Luna Rossa Challenge (ITA-94)	Emirates Team New Zealand	1:38	3–0		LRC won the start but ETNZ picked up a favourable wind shift to be ahead at the 1st mark and then extended their lead through to the finish.
June 5, 2007	Luna Rossa Challenge (ITA-94)	Emirates Team New Zealand (NZL-92)	Emirates Team New Zealand	0:52	0–4		A split-tack start, LRC was ahead at the 1st cross. At 2nd cross, LRC did not force their starboard advantage and tacked to leeward. ETNZ took LRC beyond the layline for the first mark, rounded 15 seconds ahead and were never threatened through to the finish.
June 6, 2007	Emirates Team New Zealand (NZL-92)	Luna Rossa Challenge (ITA-94)	Emirates Team New Zealand	0:22	5–0		LRC made a significant change from race four with longer wings on its keel in hopes of better upwind speed but with a penalty of more drag downwind. After remeasurement, both LRC boats did some quick testing. Race 5 began with LRC at full speed and a 1-second lead over ETNZ. However, by the first mark, ETNZ led by 20 seconds. The remainder of the race entailed LRC catching ETNZ but then dropping back. At one point in the last downwind leg LRC were within one boat length but dropped back before the finish.
