= NZL 32 =

Americas cup class yacht

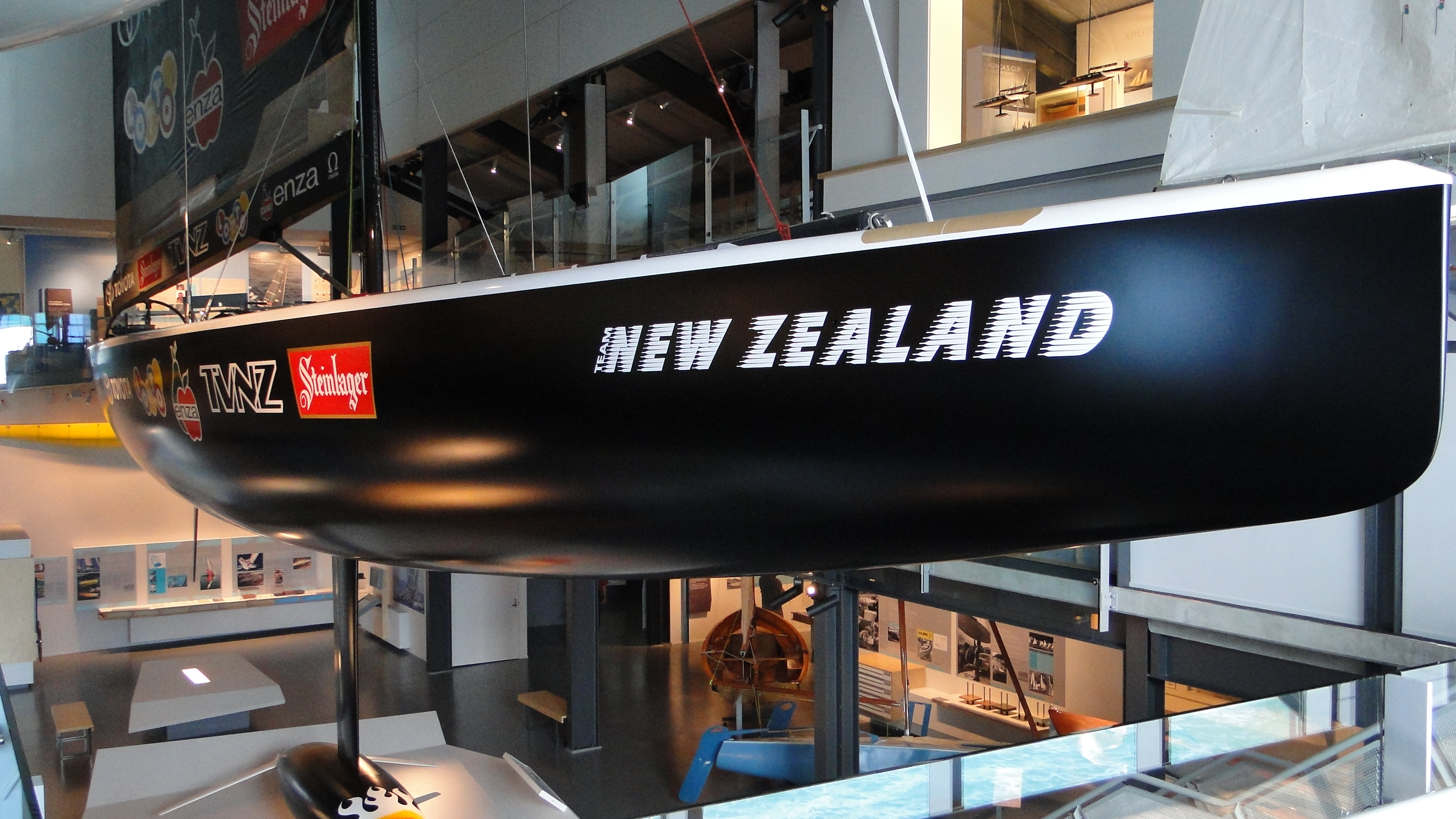
- NZL 32 on display at New Zealand Maritime Museum, Auckland
- Other names: Black Magic
- Yacht club: Royal New Zealand Yacht Squadron
- Nation: New Zealand
- Class: International America's Cup Class
- Builder: McMullen & Wing yard Auckland, NZ
- Launched: 1993
- Owner(s): Peter Blake
- Fate: Displayed at New Zealand Maritime Museum, Auckland

Racing career
- Skippers: Russell Coutts
- Notable victories: 1995 Louis Vuitton Cup; 1995 America's Cup
- America's Cup: 1995

Specifications
- Type: Monohull
- Displacement: 24.7 tons
- Length: 24.24 m (79.5 ft) (LOA); 18.04 m (59.2 ft) (LWL)
- Beam: 4.05 m (13.3 ft)
- Draft: 4.0 m (13.1 ft)
- Sail area: 330 m^{2} (3,600 sq ft)
- Crew: 16

NZL 32, or Black Magic, is an International Americas Cup Class yacht which won the 1995 America's Cup by defeating the American defender Young America in a 5–0 victory off San Diego, California.

== Design ==
NZL 32 was, in many ways, the complete opposite of her predecessor NZL 20 which contested the 1992 edition of the Louis Vuitton Cup.

Instead of being the brainchild of one man (in the case of NZL 20, Bruce Farr) she was designed by a team of Tom Schnackenberg, Doug Peterson, Laurie Davidson, David Egan, Peter Jackson, Maury Leyland, David Alan-Williams, Anthony Lehmann, Richard Karn, Wayne Smith, Mike Drumond, Chris Mitchell and Neil Wilkinson. The idea was to produce a yacht that suited the crew, catering to their specific wants and needs. NZL 32 was built of carbon fibre by the McMullen & Wing yard, Auckland, in 1994.

Her sister yacht, NZL 38, or Black Magic II, was used in the initial stages of the Louis Vuitton Cup in San Diego winning all but one race. However, Team New Zealand believed NZL 32 to be faster than NZL 38 and so retired her early, before the Louis Vuitton Cup semi-finals. NZL 38 became a trial horse for Team New Zealand's 2000 defence of the America's Cup in Auckland, and was purchased for the 2003 Cup by the Swedish Victory Challenge. She was eventually renamed Cristina.

== Career ==
=== Louis Vuitton Cup finals ===
With NZL 38 now retired, NZL 32 was brought out for the final stages of the Louis Vuitton Cup. She proved to be faster than NZL 38, winning 9 of 11 races in the semi-finals and 5 out of 6 in the finals against oneAustralia. As the winner of the Louis Vuitton Cup, she now had the right to challenge for the America's Cup itself.

=== 1995 America's Cup ===
By this stage, it was clear NZL 32 was far superior to any of her rivals, including the winner of the defender series Stars & Stripes (USA-34). With that knowledge, Stars & Stripes skipper Dennis Conner swapped boats for the Cup matches, taking the helm of Young America. While Young America didn't win the Defender's Series, she was widely believed to be faster than Stars & Stripes.

Young America was however no match for NZL 32. In what became known as a "blackwash", Black Magic trounced Young America 5–0 in the Cup match, and thus remains unbeaten in an America's Cup race.

=== After the America's Cup ===
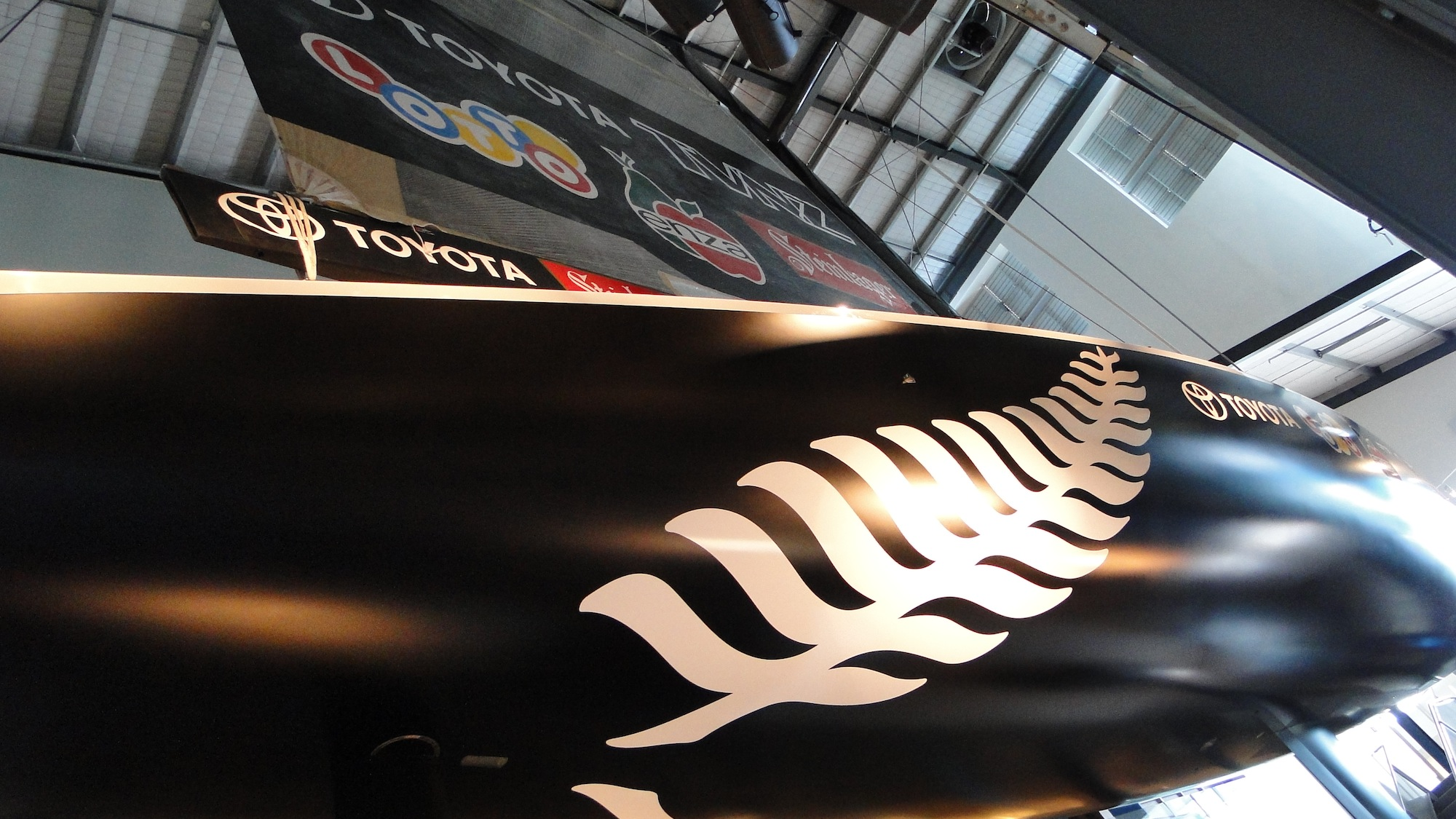
NZL 32 (underside) with silver fern

NZL 32 was used as a trial boat for the 2003 challenge of Le Défi and China Team.

In July 2002, she was donated to the Museum of New Zealand, however there was much debate over how she should be displayed to the nation. The initial proposal was for a 'glass case' with the yacht placed inside – a giant "ship in a bottle" – however this was likened to a "glass coffin" by many and as such was abandoned.

Eventually, following the murder of Team New Zealand's inspirational leader Sir Peter Blake, it was decided NZL 32 would form the centrepiece of a tribute to him. This was constructed at the National Maritime Museum in Auckland and was named 'Blue Water Black Magic' – an interactive exhibit and tribute to Blake. NZL 32 is suspended from the ceiling and can be viewed from all angles, with much of Blake's yachting memorabilia exhibited around it.

== See also ==
- List of IACC yachts
