= Shosholoza (disambiguation) =

"Shosholoza" is a South African folk song. It can also refer to:

- Shosholoza Meyl, a South African train network
- Team Shosholoza, the South African entry in the 2007 America's Cup Challenge
