= List of IACC yachts =

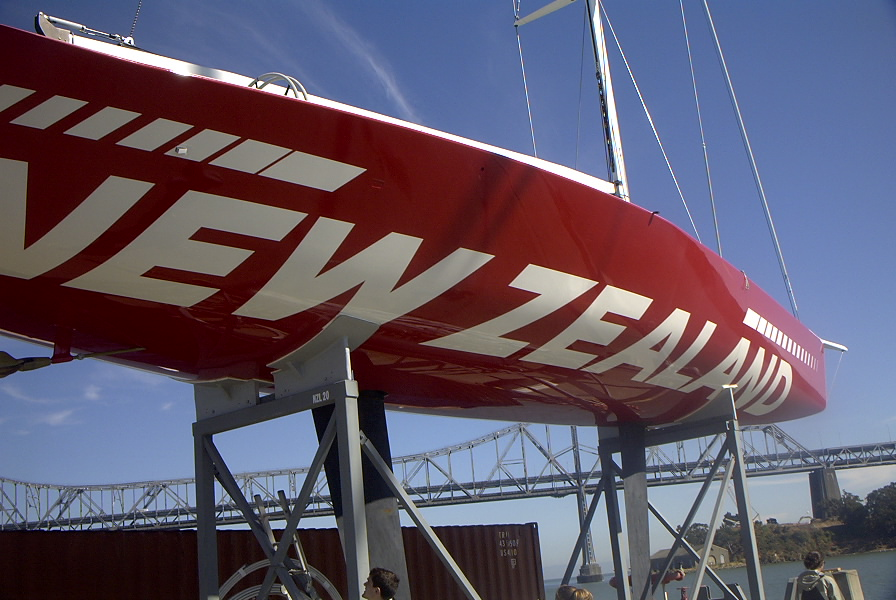
Double-keeled NZL 20

Sail numbers for the 'new generation' International America's Cup Class (IACC) yachts are issued on a sequential numerical basis. The number is then prefixed by the abbreviation for the country. If a yacht is subsequently sold to a team in a different country then the number remains unchanged but the prefix changes to reflect the new country of ownership.

Race reports tend to use team names rather than the boat names and in most cases a boat does not have a unique name. So it has become difficult to know which actual boat raced in a particular event without reference to the results list published by the race organisers.

The following list is part of ongoing research to identify particular boats and key points in their history. (Every boat after NZL-12 is 1 number earlier than its actual title due to number 13 never being used -ref Millie)

== List ==
Abbreviations: AC – America's Cup, LVC – Louis Vuitton Cup, R-R – Round-Robin.

| Sail no. | Yacht name | Original team/syndicate | Competitive history | Subsequent history |
|---|---|---|---|---|
| ITA–1 | Il Moro di Venezia | Il Moro di Venezia | Trial boat (never raced) | Originally launched 11 March 1990. Sausalito Challenge SF, USA |
| FRA–2 | | Le Défi Francais | Trial boat (never raced) | Actually launched a week prior to ITA–1, 3 March 1990, but was second sail number issued. Currently on display at Conservatoire International de la Plaisance de Bordeaux, France. |
| JPN–3 | | Nippon Challenge | Trial boat (never raced) | On display at Gamagori Station, Gamagōri, Aichi, Japan |
| SLO–4 | | Slovenian Challenge | | Only wooden IACC Yacht. Yugoslav America's Cup Organization Maribor (YACOMA), representing the former Yugoslavia prior to breakup. Later was joint challenge between Slovenia and Croatia. Disappeared during conflict. Current status unknown. |
| ESP–5 | | Desafio Español | Trial boat (never raced) | Sold to Poland for a Polish campaign (that never materialised, re-registered as POL–5, in early 2007 sold to Supersail Deutschland for corporate charters in Kiel, sail number is ESP–5 again.) |
| JPN–6 | | Nippon Challenge | Trial boat (never raced) | On display at Takeshima wharf, Gamagōri, Aichi, Japan |
| ITA–7 | Il Moro di Venezia II | Il Moro di Venezia | Trial boat (never raced) | Launched at Puerto Portals, Palma de Mallorca, Spain, on 7 August 1990. Trieste, Italy. |
| FRA–8 | | Le Défi Francais | | Available for Charter in la Seyne sur Mer – F2 Ville de Paris – seaworthy condition, hull needs some cosmetic work, parts used from sister ship FRA–27. |
| USA–9 | Jayhawk | America³ | Raced in R-R 1 of 1992 defender series 0–6 discarded for USA–18, USA–23 | Launched on 1 May 1991. On display in Wichita, Kansas. |
| NZL–10 | | NZ Challenge | Trial boat (never raced) | Charter in Nassau, Bahamas |
| USA–11 | | Stars & Stripes | Lost 1992 defender finals 4–7 | Used by Dennis Conner as trial horse for 1995 campaign, sold to the US Virgin Islands America's Cup Challenge for AC 2000. Sunk in hurricane, shipped to Miami for refurbishment in 2002, and brought to San Diego for charter. In dry storage in San Diego. |
| NZL–12 | | NZ Challenge | Trial boat (never raced) | Charter in Nassau, Bahamas |
| 13 | Sail number never issued. | | | |
| NZL–14 | | NZ Challenge | Trial boat (never raced) | Charter in Queenstown, New Zealand Scrapped by council after deemed abandoned |
| ITA–15 | Il Moro di Venezia III | Il Moro di Venezia | Trial boat (never raced) | Launched 15 April 1991, San Diego, California. Bought by Diego della Valle and used during the 1995 edition of the Cup as display boat. Gifted to the Autorità Portuale Ravenna is now on display on top of the Darsena (internal harbour) |
| ITA–16 | Il Moro di Venezia IV | Il Moro di Venezia | Trial boat, never raced | Launched 15 June 1991, San Diego, California. Currently under restoration in Ventura, California USA. Scheduled for charter in November 2007 out of Portofino Yacht Club, Redondo Beach, CA, USA. Project delayed until 2009, hull restoration complete, no hardware. Faces challenge for charter due to Italian construction, occupancy limits and US Coast Guard certification. Now in San Diego in dry storage. |
| AUS–17 | Challenge of Australia | Challenge Australia | Finished 8th 1992 LVC | Gear was re-used for AUS–29 |
| USA–18 | Defiant | America³ | Superseded by USA–28 after 1992 third defender R-R | On Display at the Herreshoff Marine Museum and America's Cup Hall of Fame in Bristol, Rhode Island. |
| SWE–19 | Tre kronor | Swedish America's Cup Challenge | Finished 7th 1992 LVC | Charter in Sweden. She can be spotted on Google maps. |
| NZL–20 | New Zealand | NZ Challenge | Lost 1992 LVC Final to ITA–25 4–7 | Restored in 2000 and sailed (privately) in San Francisco. In 2005 returned to Auckland, New Zealand and was moored in Viaduct Basin. Now on stands at Gulf Harbour Marina, Whangaparaoa Peninsula, NZ. |
| AUS–21 | | Spirit of Australia | Finished 6th in 1992 LVC | Charter Sydney Harbour. Renamed "FT Spirit" by Financial Times newspaper for year-long lease. Heavily damaged on 25 October 2004 after slamming into underwater rocks near Sydney Opera House, throwing charter passengers overboard. The keel and ballast were ripped off, the mast smashed the Opera House walkway, and the boat capsized. Towed to Noakes Boatyard at Berrys Bay for repairs. Now restored and charter sailing in Sydney Harbor as "Spirit". |
| ESP–22 | Espana 92 | Desafio Español | Finished 5th in 1992 LVC | Training boat for Desafio 95, currently grounded in Cadiz (Spain) near the bridge in the entrance of the city. |
| USA–23 | America³ | America³ | Winner 1992 AC 4–1 against ITA–25, also used in Defender trials in 1995 prior to replacement USA–43 | Purchased by Patrizio Bertelli for his Prada Challenge as training boat for 2000. Reacquired by Bill Koch and restored to 1992 condition. Was on display in 2005 at Boston Museum of Fine Art. Currently on display in West Palm Beach, Florida. |
| RUS–24 | | Age of Russia | Hull arrived in San Diego, but never sailed | Anchored in Morro Bay. Current sail number is USA–24. Washed ashore and destroyed on Coronado Beach, Nov 7, 2020. |
| ITA–25 | Il Moro di Venezia V | Il Moro di Venezia | Defeated challenger for 1992 AC 1–4 to USA–23 | Launched 16 December 1991, San Diego, California. In 1997 purchased by Paul Cayard's AmericaOne syndicate as trial horse for USA–60 for AC2000. In 2001 sold to OneWorld Challenge for 2003 America's Cup trial horse. Reunited with USA–23 and owned by Bill Koch, on display in 2005 at Boston Museum of Fine Art. Currently in Newport RI. |
| JPN–26 | Nippon | Nippon Challenge | 3rd after LVC 1992 semi-final | On display at Laguna Gamagori, Gamagōri, Aichi, Japan |
| FRA–27 | F3 Ville de Paris | Le Défi Francais | 4th after LVC 1992 semi-final | In St. Tropez, France – F3 Ville de Paris – very poor condition, damaged bow, blue hull paint completely worn, stripped for parts to support F2 Ville de Paris (FRA–8), which is available for charter by Académie de Yachting in St. Tropez, and is berthed next to FRA–27 along Quai d'Estienne d'Orves, near the lighthouse, St. Tropez harbor. |
| USA–28 | Kanza | America³ | Sailed only in 1992 defender R-R 4, discarded for USA–23 | Upon launch in February 1992 was nicknamed Kanza. Currently owned by +39 Challenge in Palermo Sicily with +39 Challenge livery. |
| AUS–29 | Sydney 95 | Australian Challenge | 6th in 1995 LVC R-R | In 2000 sailed by Young Australia. Is in Cabo San Lucas, Mexico, with AUS–31, NZL– 81 and NZL 82. |
| JPN–30 | | Nippon Challenge | Sailed in 1995 LVC R-R 1 | On display in Japan |
| AUS–31 | | oneAustralia | Defeated in 1995 LVC final to NZL–32 | In 2000 sailed by Young Australia. AUS–31 currently in Cabo San Lucas, Mexico with AUS–29, NZL–81 and NZL–82 running match races for tourists to the area. |
| NZL–32 | NZL 32 | Team New Zealand | Winner of the 1995 AC. Winner 1995 LVC | Trial boat for LE DEFI 2003, currently displayed at New Zealand National Maritime Museum |
| FRA–33 | France 3 | Le Défi Francais | Sailed in 1995 LVC R-R 1 | Currently named "France 3" in charter with Solent Experience (operated by Sunsail) out of Portsmouth, UK |
| USA–34 | | Stars & Stripes | Won 1995 defender series, discarded for USA–36 in finals | Charter in San Diego. |
| AUS–35 | | oneAustralia | Broke apart and sank in deep water off San Diego, CA on 6 March 1995 during LVC R-R 4 | Attempts to recover the boat were abandoned |
| USA–36 | Young America | PACT 95 | Sailed by Stars & Stripes team in unsuccessful 1995 AC defense | Hull on display (permanent collection) Storm King Art Center, Mountainville NY, USA |
| FRA–37 | France 3 | Le Défi Francais | Finished 5th LVC R-R | Currently named France 3 in charter with Solent Experience (operated by Sunsail) out of Portsmouth, UK |
| NZL–38 | | Team New Zealand | Raced in 1995 LVC round robins and semi-finals. Sold to Victory Challenge, Sweden, to support 2003 AC challenge. | New sail number and name is SWE–38 (Christina). Was in the SailNZ loft in Auckland, NZ then sat in a storage yard in Auckland, NZ. Currently sitting in a storage yard in Hobsonville, Auckland, NZ. |
| NZL–39 | | Tag Heuer | 3rd in 1995 LVC. | 2005 – Sold to Supersail Deutschland in Kiel, Germany for corporate charters. |
| FRA–40 | Harmonie | Challenge France | Failed project, boat completed but never raced | Chartered in Auckland as NZL-40 with Explore Group before relocation to Australia with Sailing Sydney as AUS–40 |
| JPN–41 | Nippon 95 | Nippon Challenge | Finished 4th in 1995 LVC. | Charter in New Zealand with Explore Group as NZL–41 |
| ESP–42 | Roja de Espana | Desafio Español | Finished 7th in 1995 LVC. | Became ESP–56 |
| USA–43 | Mighty Mary | America³ | Competed in 1995 defender series with all-female crew. | Owned by +39 Challenge in Palermo Sicily in +39 Challenge livery. |
| JPN–44 | Ashura | Nippon Challenge | Sailed in R-R 1 & 2, finished 4th in 2000 LVC Semi-final | America's Cup Management, on display in Valencia. |
| ITA–45 | Luna Rossa | Prada Challenge | Winner 2000 LVC 5–4 over USA–61, lost AC 0–5 to NZL–60 | |
| FRA–46 | 6eme sens | Le Défi Francais | Finished 6th in 2000 LVC Semi-finals | Owner China Team, in Valencia |
| ESP–47 | Bravo Espana | Desafio Español | Finished 2000 LVC R-Rs in 8th place | Sold to Mascalzone Latino, later sold to UITG in a package together with 72 in an effort to get rid of 47. When UITG sold 72 to Supersail Deutschland for their Lake Constance operation they too sold the two boats together. 47 is still located on Elba, in an outdoor cradle, not covered for years and in a sorry state. |
| ITA–48 | | Prada Challenge | Sailed in 2000vLVC R-R 1 & 2 | Owner Shosholoza, in MSC yard, Salt River, Cape Town |
| USA–49 | | AmericaOne | Sailed in 2000 LVC R-R 1,2, & 3 | Involved in minor collision in the early rounds of AC2000 with USA–55 Stars and Stripes. Acquired by BMW Oracle Racing in advance of AC2003. Acquired 2006 by Next Level Sailing (San Diego, CA). Currently sitting in south San Diego Bay in dry dock at Knight and Carver Marina, National City, California next to USA–50. |
| USA–50 | Abracadabra | Aloha Racing | Sailed in 2000 LVC R-R 1 & 2 | Acquired in 2005 by Next Level Sailing (San Diego, CA) for competition in local regattas. Purchased by Lorne Leibel 2005 and restored to original racing condition. Sold in 2024 and received USCG COI in 2025. Boat is available for charter in San Diego. sail50.com |
| USA–51 | | America True | Finished 5th 2000 LVC Semi-finals | 2007 – Owned by Desafio Español 2007 |
| JPN–52 | Idaten | Nippon Challenge | Raced in 2000 LVC R-R 3 | In 2005 sold to Supersail Deutschland in Kiel, Germany for corporate charters. Renamed GBR–52. During 2007 based in Valencia. Since early 2008 sailing on Lake Constance. The keel has been shortened to allow her to pass over a bar in the marina entrance. |
| USA–53 | Young America | Young America | Hull failure during 2000 LVC R-Rs | Luna Rossa Challenge, location unknown |
| USA–54 | | Aloha Racing | Sailed in 2000 LVC R-R 3, finished 9th | Sold by Aloha Racing (Waikiki Yacht Club) to BMW Oracle racing as training boat, later acquired by Team Dennis Conner as trial horse for USA 66 and heavily modified. Currently in San Diego for charter. |
| USA–55 | | Stars & Stripes | Finished 3rd 2000 LVC Semi-finals | Owner Mascalzone Latino, on display in Naples, Italy at the Port of Naples |
| ESP–56 | | Desafio Español | Trial boat (never raced) | Private owner, in Cartagena Spain |
| NZL–57 | | Team New Zealand | Training boat for 2000 challenge | Owner Areva Challenge by way of K-Challenge in Valencia. |
| USA–58 | Young America | Young America | Replaced USA–53 in 2000 LVC R-R 2 & R-R 3. | Luna Rossa Challenge, location unknown |
| SUI–59 | Be Happy | FAST 2000 | Test yacht | Owner +39 challenge competed in Act 5 of LVC |
| NZL–60 | | Team New Zealand | 2000 AC – Successful defender 5/0 v ITA–45 | Sat in a storage yard in Auckland, NZ, then sat in a storage yard in Hobsonville, Auckland, NZ.On display at Team New Zealand Headquarters |
| USA–61 | | AmericaOne | Lost 2000 LVC finals to ITA–45 4–5 | Owner BMW Oracle Racing and on Display in Munich Airport. |
| RUS–62 | | Number issued but no name | Re-worked RUS–24, Again never sailed | Unknown |
| SWE–63 | Örn | Victory Challenge | Built for 2003 AC campaign. Sailed in LVC R-R 1 | Victory Challenge in Valencia |
| SUI–64 | | Alinghi | 2003 AC – Successful challenger 5–0 over NZL–82. Winner 2003 LVC | |
| USA–65 | | One World Challenge | Sailed in 2003 LVC Quarter-finals | Sold to Desafio Español as test and Trial boat. In April 2014, mussels caused damage and the keel fell off, causing the boat to capsize. Location |
| USA–66 | | Stars & Stripes | Crew training and tuning boat for USA–77 | |
| USA–67 | | One World Challenge | Sailed in 2003 LVC Semi-finals Repechage lost to USA–76 | Sold to Desafio Español as test and Trial boat. Location |
| GER–68 | | Illbruck Challenge | Lent unfinished to ETNZ. Finished and used as a training boat for ETNZ 2007 campaign. | TNZ 2007, in New Zealand. Sold and currently under charter in New Zealand with Explore Group as NZL–68 |
| FRA–69 | | Le Défi Areva | Sailed in 2003 LVC until QF | Acquired by China Team in 2005 as part of the LE DEFI support package. Significant parts of the structure and equipment were subsequently used in the construction of CHN–95 |
| GBR–70 | Wight Lightning | GBR Challenge | Sailed in 2003 LVC until QF, | |
| USA–71 | | BMW Oracle Racing | Trial boat (never raced) | Was on display at Oracle Headquarters lagoon (Redwood City, CA) Replaced in May 2014 by AC33 winning USA–17 trimaran. |
| ITA–72 | | Mascalzone Latino | Eliminated after 2003 LVC round robins | Sold to UITG, modified to Version V for the LVC. Sold to Supersail Deutschland for corporate charters on Lake Constance. Keel has been shortened to allow her to pass over a bar in the marina entrance and an inboard engine has been fitted, but otherwise the boat has been kept mostly unchanged. |
| SWE–73 | Orm | Victory Challenge | 2003 LVC – Quarter-finals Repechage | Victory Challenge in Valencia |
| ITA–74 | | Prada Challenge | Lost 2003 LVC Semi-finals to USA–65 | Luna Rossa, in Valencia |
| SUI–75 | | Alinghi | Built for 2003 AC campaign. Trial boat (SUI–64 was raced) | Bought in 2007 by TEAMORIGIN, a new British challenger for the 33rd AC edition. First sailed as GBR–75 in Valencia, Spain, 14–7–07. |
| USA–76 | USA 76 | BMW Oracle Racing | Lost to SUI–64 in 2003 LVC finals | Winner of Moet Cup in 2003. Currently in charter operation in San Francisco, CA. |
| USA–77 | | Stars & Stripes | 2003 LVC. Sank while in testing in San Diego. Raised and sailed in LVC quarter-finals repechage | Mascalzone Latino, location unknown. |
| GBR–78 | Wight Magic | GBR Challenge | Trial boat (never raced) Twin Keel | GBR challenge, location Medina Yard, Cowes, I-O-W |
| FRA–79 | | Le Défi Areva | Trial boat, (never raced) | Team China, location Valencia |
| ITA–80 | | Luna Rossa Challenge | 4th 2003 LVC Lost to USA–65 OneWorld Challenge in Semi-finals/Repechage | Team Luna Rossa, location Valencia |
| NZL–81 | | Emirates Team New Zealand | Tuning and training boat for 2003 AC defence. Trial boat (never raced) | Along with NZL–82, boat is in Cabo San Lucas, MX. Staffed by team members of ETNZ, public can sail on actual America's Cup Yacht via www.cabo-adventures.com. |
| NZL–82 | NZL 82 | Emirates Team New Zealand | 2003 AC defender. Beaten 5–0 by Alinghi | Along with NZL–81, boat is in Cabo San Lucas, MX. Staffed by team members of ETNZ, public can sail on actual America's Cup Yacht via www.cabo-adventures.com. |
| RSA–83 | | Team Shosholoza | 7th 2007 LVC. 9 wins and 11 defeats. | Owner Shosholoza, in MSC yard, Salt River, Cape Town |
| NZL–84 | | Emirates Team New Zealand | 2007 LVC – 2nd in Act 13 | Offered as one of the boats for the ETNZ-backed Louis Vuitton Pacific Series in Auckland, NZ, 31 January to 14 February 2009. |
| ITA–85 | | +39 Challenge | 9th 2007 LVC. 5 wins and 15 defeats. | Scrapped in Valencia/Spain, November 2014. |
| ITA–86 | | Luna Rossa Challenge | Racing boat for Luna Rossa | |
| USA–87 | USA 87 | BMW Oracle Racing | Trial boat (not raced in LVC) | On loan to Emirates Team New Zealand for the upcoming ETNZ-backed Louis Vuitton Pacific Series in Auckland, NZ, 31 January to 14 February 2009. Arrived in Auckland from Valencia December 2008. Sat in a yard in Auckland, NZ. Currently sitting in a storage yard in Hobsonville, Auckland, NZ. |
| ESP–88 | | Desafio Español 2007 | 2007 generation yacht and tune up boat for ESP 97 | |
| GER–89 | Germany 1 | United Internet Team Germany | 10th 2007 LVC. 2 wins and 18 defeats. | |
| ITA–90 | | Mascalzone Latino-Capitalia Team | | |
| GER–91 | | Alinghi | 2007 AC. Built as a potential Defender but used for tuning and 'in-house' racing against SUI–100 | Acquired by United Internet Team Germany in October 2007 |
| NZL–92 | NZL 92 | Emirates Team New Zealand | Winner 2007 LVC but unsuccessful as Challenger for the 2007 AC losing 2–5 against SUI–100. | Offered as one of the boats for the upcoming ETNZ-backed Louis Vuitton Pacific Series in Auckland, NZ, 31 January to 14 February 2009. Sat in a storage yard in Auckland, NZ. Currently sitting in a storage yard in Hobsonville, Auckland, NZ. |
| FRA–93 | | Areva Challenge | 6th 2007 LVC. 8 wins and 12 losses | |
| ITA–94 | | Luna Rossa Challenge | Losing finalist 2007 LVC. Lost 0–5 to NZL 92 | |
| CHN–95 | | China Team | 11th 2007 LVC. 1 win and 19 defeats | |
| SWE–96 | Järv | Victory Challenge | 5th 2007 LVC. 12 wins and 8 defeats. | |
| ESP–97 | | Desafio Español 2007 | Losing semi-finalist 2007 LVC. Lost 2–5 to NZL 92 | Currently abandoned |
| USA–98 | | BMW Oracle Racing | Losing semi-finalist 2007 LVC. Lost 1–5 to ITA–94. | On loan to ETNZ (Emirates Team New Zealand) for the ETNZ-backed Louis Vuitton Pacific Series in Auckland, NZ, 31 January to 14 February 2009. Arrived in Auckland from Valencia December 2008. |
| ITA–99 | | Mascalzone Latino-Capitalia Team | | |
| SUI–100 | | Alinghi | Successful Defender of the 2007 AC winning 5–2 against NZL–92 | Stored at Marina Sur in Valencia, Spain. Location: |
| GER–101 | | United Internet Team Germany | Construction started 22 May 2007 at Knierim-Yachtbau in Kiel | America's Cup Management announced that a new type of boat will be used for the 33rd America's Cup challenge which caused the plans for completion to be changed. |

== See also ==
- International America's Cup Class
