= Anthony Nossiter =

Australian sailor

Anthony Nossiter (born 1973) is an Australian sailor and Olympic medalist. He competed at the 2000, 2004 and 2008 Summer Olympics. His best Olympic result is a sixth place in the Finn class in Athens in 2004. He was an Australian Institute of Sport scholarship holder.

He sailed with +39 Challenge in the 2007 Louis Vuitton Cup and has twice competed in the Volvo Ocean Race; in 2001–02 on Djuice Dragons and in 2011–12 on Azzam.
