= Le Défi =

Career
- Yacht club: Union Nationale pour la Course au Large
- Nation: France
- Notable sailors: Bertrand Pacé; Luc Pillot

Yachts
- Sail no.: Boat name
- FRA–46: FRA 46
- FRA–69: FRA 69

Le Défi was a French America's Cup team that competed in the 1992, 1995, 2000 and 2003 Louis Vuitton Cups and in the first few Acts of the 2007 Louis Vuitton Cup. After 2005 Le Défi supported China Team.

== History ==
Le Défi BTT competed in the 2000 Louis Vuitton Cup, sailing FRA-46. The team finished sixth after the round robins, making the elimination stage. However they could not make the finals of the Cup.

As Le Defi Areva they entered the 2003 Louis Vuitton Cup, finishing eighth with FRA-69. They were then eliminated by Victory Challenge in the first knock-out stage.

In the first three Louis Vuitton Acts in 2004 Le Defi finished fifth of the eight teams, sailing with FRA-69.

After this the team began supporting China Team and FRA-69 became CHN-69. The team finished last in the 2007 Louis Vuitton Cup.
