= 2000 Louis Vuitton Cup =

5th Louis Vuitton sailing competition in New Zealand

5th Louis Vuitton Cup
Event information
- Type: Challenge race for America's Cup
- Dates: 18 October 1999 – 6 February 2000
- Host city: Auckland, New Zealand
- Boats: Prada Challenge (Italy); America One (United States); Aloha Racing (United States); America True (United States); Desafio Español (Spain); Fast 2000 (Switzerland); Le Defi BTT (France); Nippon Challenge (Japan); Team Dennis Conner (United States); Young America (United States) (Australia)

Results
- Winner: Prada Challenge (Italy)

Succession
- Previous: 1995 Louis Vuitton Cup
- Next: 2003 Louis Vuitton Cup

The 5th Louis Vuitton Cup was held in Auckland, New Zealand, in 2000. The winner, Prada Challenge, went on to challenge for the 2000 America's Cup. It was the first time in the competition's history that there would not be an American challenger or defender.

== Details ==
After winning the 29th America's Cup, Team New Zealand immediately accepted the challenge from the New York Yacht Club and announced that the next Cup would be in 2000, with the Louis Vuitton Cup being in late 1999. This delay was to avoid conflicting with the 1997/98 Whitbread Round the World Race and give Auckland the time to build the necessary infrastructure to host the cup.

== Teams ==
The New York Yacht Club was the challenger of record. By 31 January 1998 16 teams from 10 nations had made the $US 250,000 deposit to officially challenge for the America's Cup. In the end only 11 challenges from seven nations competed for the Louis Vuitton Cup. Hong Kong, British and Russian challenges withdrew while an American team and a French team merged into existing challenges.

Club	Team	Skipper	Yachts
(Italy) Yacht Club Punta Ala	Prada Challenge	(Italy) Francesco de Angelis	ITA-45 & ITA 48
(United States) St. Francis Yacht Club	America One	(United States) Paul Cayard	USA-49
(United States) Waikiki Yacht Club	Aloha Racing	(United States) John Kolius	USA-50 & USA-54
(United States) San Francisco Yacht Club	America True	(United States) Dawn Riley	USA-51
(Spain) Monte Real Club de Yates de Bayona	Desafio Español	(Spain) Pedro Campos Calvo-Sotelo	ESP-47 & ESP-56
(Switzerland) Club Nautique de Morges	Fast 2000	(France) Marc Pajot	SUI-59
(France) Union Nationale Pour La Course au Large	Le Defi BTT	(France) Bertrand Pacé	FRA-46
(Japan) Nippon Yacht Club	Nippon Challenge	(Australia) Peter Gilmour	JPN-44 & JPN-52
(United States) San Diego Yacht Club	Team Dennis Conner	(United States) Dennis Conner	USA-55
(United States) New York Yacht Club	Young America	(United States) Ed Baird	USA-53 & USA-58
Cruising Yacht Club of Australia	Young Australia	(Australia) James Spithill	AUS-31

=== Prada Challenge (ITA) ===
A strong two boat challenge led by Patrizio Bertelli and sponsored by Prada, the team was formed in 1997 and became an early favourite in Auckland. The team used designer Germán Frers who worked for Il Moro di Venezia in 1992. Francesco de Angelis was the skipper with Rod Davis acting as the sailing coach. The crew included Matteo Plazzi, Alan Smith, Giuseppe Brizzi, Pietro D'Alì, Simone de Mari, mid-bowman Max Sirena and Torben Grael. Prada originally acquired two boats from the America^{3} syndicate before building ITA 45 and ITA 48.

Umberto Panerai was a trainer.

=== AmericaOne (USA) ===
Skippered by Paul Cayard, AmericaOne was one of two syndicates from the San Francisco Bay Area in 2000. AmericaOne purchased OneAustralia as a training boat before developing USA-49 and USA-61. The team included tactician John Kostecki, navigator Terry Hutchinson, Lexi Gahagan, Billy Bates, Curtis Blewett, Josh Belsky, Gavin Brady, Sean Clarkson, Justin Clougher, Kevin Hall, Mike Howard, Pieter van Nieuwenhuyzen, Morgan Larson, David McClintock, Jim Nicholas, Carter Perrin, Greg Prussia, Russ Silvestri, Ralf Steitz, Phil Trinter, Morgan Trubovich, Matt Welling and Ray Davies. Robert Billingham was the chief operations officer.

=== Aloha Racing (USA) ===
Funded by Dr Jim Andrews, Aloha Racing built on their ocean racing history to launch an America's Cup challenge from Hawaii. Skippered by veteran John Kolius, the team secured sponsorship from HealthSouth to ensure their participation. The team built USA-50 and USA-54, both called Abracadabra 2000, and opted to train in Hawaii, rather than Auckland, before the Cup. The crew included Chris Larson, Cameron Dunn, Brian MacInnes, Marco Constant, and John Bertrand.

=== America True (USA) ===
America True was one of two syndicates from the San Francisco Bay Area in 2000. The team was led by CEO Dawn Riley and John Cutler served as helmsman. The team was funded largely with private funding provided by G. Christopher Coffin, which allowed them to purchase Tag Heuer before developing USA-51. The design team, led by Phil Kaiko, also benefited from America^{3}'s design information. The crew included Buddy Melges, Kelvin Harrap, David Armitage, Carl Barkow, Liz Baylis, Ben Beer, Jamie Boeckel, Greg Burrell, Merritt Carey, Lisa Charles, Tom Faire, Daniel Fong, Scott Gregory, Stephen Gruver, Peter Heck, Al Palewicz, Katie Pettibone, Hal Sears, John Spence, Latimer Spinney, John Sweeney, Tucker Thompson, Brad Webb, Jon Ziskind, Jeff Madrigali, David Stevenson and Leslie Egnot. David Barnes skippered the testing boat.

=== Desafio Español (ESP) ===
Skippered by Pedro Campos, as in 1992 and 1995, the team added Olympic medal winning sailor Luis Doreste to the crew in 2000. Backed by the government, royal family and major sponsor Telefonica. The team built ESP 47 and ESP 56.

Before the regatta a crew member, Martin Wizner, died almost instantly when he was hit in the head by a broken piece of equipment.

=== FAST 2000 (SUI) ===
Led by experienced French campaigner Marc Pajot and with German Jochen Schümann as helmsman, the FAST 2000 team was the countries first America's Cup challenge. SUI 59 was an unknown quantity when it arrived in Auckland but the syndicate ended up with a disappointing 2 wins over the course of the Cup.

Other crew members included Enrico Chieffi, Pierre Fehlmann, Yves Detrey, and Hans Bernard.

=== Le Defi BTT (FRA) ===
Le Defi Bouygues Telecom Transiciel was a one boat challenge from France led by Syndicate head Luc Gelluseau and operations manager Pierre Mas. The team was skippered by Bertrand Pacé, who replaced Marc Pajot from the 1995 challenge, and Thierry Peponnet was the teams tactician. Thierry Fouchier was also on the crew. Two other French syndicates attempted to form challenges and almost competed as Le Defi Sud, but in the end lacked the money required to charter a boat to compete.

=== Nippon Challenge (JPN) ===
The third challenge from the Japanese syndicate funded by S&B foods chairman Tatsumitsu Yamasaki. The team was led by Australian Peter Gilmour. The team was hit early on by the loss of former syndicate head Makoto Namba, who was lost at sea, and the Asian financial crisis, which severely limited the team's budget. The team launched JPN 44 and JPN 52 for the 2000 Louis Vuitton Cup.

=== Team Dennis Conner (USA) ===
Team Dennis Conner was Dennis Conner's eighth America's Cup challenge or defence. The team was sponsored by Citizen Watches and USA-55 adopted the familiar name of Stars & Stripes, common to all of Conner's boats since 1986. The team was representing the Cortez Racing Association and included Peter Isler and Ken Read in the afterguard. Peter Holmberg also joined the team as a tactician, merging the US Virgin Islands Challenge into the team after the syndicate ran out of funds. Other personnel included Bill Trenkle, Tom Whidden and Erle Williams.

=== Young America (USA) ===
Representing the New York Yacht Club, the challenger of record, Young America built on John Marshall's PACT '95 syndicate. The team's yacht's USA 53 and USA 58 were designed by Bruce Farr and built on the 1995 Cup defender Young America. The Helmsman was Ed Baird and the crew included tactician Jim Brady, navigator Ed Adams, Ross Halcrow, Tom Burnham, Dean Brenner, and Jamie Gale.

=== Young Australia (AUS) ===
Young Australia was Syd Fischer's final America's Cup challenge and currently was the most recent America's Cup entry from Australia. The young crew was led by James Spithill, then just 19, and included Wade Morgan, Joey Newton, and Andy Fethers. The syndicate sailed with two old boats, Sydney '95 (AUS-29) and oneAustralia (AUS-31) which were not competitive against some of the newer designs sailed by competitive syndicates. Involved in the campaign were experienced sailors and America's Cup campaigners Sir James Hardy and Iain Murray.

== Round robin ==
Team name	Races	Won	RR1 Pts.	RR2 Pts.	RR3 Pts.	Total Pts.	Ranking
(Italy) Prada Challenge	29	26	10	36	63	109	1
(Japan) Nippon Challenge	30	20	6	24	72	102	2
(United States) America True	30	21	6	32	63	101	3
(United States) AmericaOne	30	22	8	28	63	99	4
(United States) Team Dennis Conner	30	18	5	28	54	87	5
(France) Le Defi BTT	29	12	2	12	63	77	6
(Spain) Desafio Espanol	30	14	5	12	54	71	7
(United States) Young America	30	16	8	16	36	60	8
(United States) Aloha Racing	30	11	4	12	36	52	9
Young Australia	30	4	1	8	9	18	10
(Switzerland) Fast 2000	30	2	0	8	0	8	11

Three round robin series (RR1-RR3) were held. During RR1 a team scored 1 point per win. During RR2 a team scored 4 points per win. During RR3 a team scored 9 points per win.

== Knock-out stage ==
=== Semi-finals ===
Pos	Team	Pld	W	L	Pts	
1	(United States) AmericaOne	10	8	2	8	Advance to finals
2	(Italy) Prada Challenge	10	7	3	7	Advance to finals
3	(United States) Team Dennis Conner	10	7	3	7	
4	(Japan) Nippon Challenge	10	5	5	5	
5	(United States) America True	10	3	7	3	
6	(France) Le Defi BTT	10	2	8	2	

Source: SEMI-FINALS UPDATE • 2-14 JANUARY, 2000

=== Final ===
Team	I	II	III	IV	V	VI	VII	VIII	IX	Pts
(Italy) Prada Challenge	W	+1:33	W	W	+0:34	+0:09	+1:06	W	W	5
(United States) AmericaOne	+0:25	W	DNF	DNF	W	W	W	+0:37	+0:49	4
