= Simone de Mari =

Italian sailor

Simone de Mari is an Italian sailor who has competed in multiple America's Cups.

He sailed in the 2000 Louis Vuitton Cup as a grinder for Prada Challenge. De Mari fell overboard during one of the races, but was recovered and Prada Challenge went on to win the Cup before losing 0–5 to Team New Zealand in the America's Cup.

He stayed with the team, which was later renamed to Luna Rossa Challenge for the 2003 and 2007 Louis Vuitton Cups. Working

He then joined Oracle Racing in 2008 and was the pitman on USA 17 when it won the 2010 America's Cup.

He sailed in the 2011 Extreme Sailing Series with the Italian Niceforyou team and also sailed with Mascalzone Latino that year. He then re-joined Luna Rossa and sailed with them in the 2013 Louis Vuitton Cup.
