= Desafío Español =

Yacht racing team

Desafío Español 2007

Career
- Yacht club: Real Federación Española de Vela
- Established: 2004
- Nation: Spain
- Team principal(s): Agustín Zulueta
- Skipper: Karol Jablonski

Yachts
- Sail no.: Boat name
- ESP–88: ESP 88
- ESP–97: ESP 97

Desafío Español 2007 is a yacht racing team that competed for the Louis Vuitton Cup 2007, the challenger series held prior to the America's Cup. They made the Semi Finals before being eliminated by Team New Zealand.

John Cutler was the teams tactician and technical director.

- Official Website (defunct)
