= Magnus Augustson =

Swedish sailor

Karl Magnus Augustson (born 14 Match 1973) is a Swedish Olympic sailor. He finished 7th in the Soling event at the 2000 Summer Olympics together with Hans Wallén and Johan Barne.

Augustson has sailed in multiple America’s Cups, competing for Victory Challenge in 2003, Luna Rossa Challenge in 2007 and Artemis Racing in the 2013 America's Cup.
