= Royal Cape Yacht Club =

South African yacht club

Royal Cape Yacht Club (RCYC)
- Burgee
- Formation: 1905
- Legal status: active
- Purpose: Yacht Club
- Location: Cape Town, South Africa
- Coordinates: 33°55′14″S 18°26′36″E
- Affiliations: South African Sailing
- Website: www.rcyc.co.za

The Royal Cape Yacht Club is one of South Africa’s most active and oldest yacht clubs. Located in Cape Town, the Club plays host to many important national sailing events, including South Africa’s premier ocean yacht race, the internationally renowned Cape to Rio.

== History ==
Founded in 1905 as the Table Bay Yacht Club, and after merging with the Alfred Rowing Club, the name was later changed to the Cape Yacht Club in January 1914. In March 1914, the newly-named Cape Yacht Club applied for a Royal Warrant via the South African Governor-General, Viscount Gladstone. In reply, the Governor-General informed the Club that His Majesty King George V was "graciously pleased to approve the title Royal to the Cape Yacht Club".

In June, Viscount Gladstone further approved a recommendation that the RCYC be issued with an Admiralty Warrant, authorising the use of the plain Blue Ensign, however the First World War suspended such Warrants. In April 1920, the authorisation was again recommended, with the Club committee agreeing to adopt the Blue Ensign defaced with the club coat of arms. To fly a Blue Ensign was, and still is, considered a great honour and a privilege for a yacht club, certifying British maritime guardianship. Admiralty Warrants were later suspended once again during the Second World War, along with wider South African yachting.

In 1960, a successful referendum had called for South Africa to become a republic, which was constituted in 1961 and in which South Africa also left the British Commonwealth. As legal and heraldic changes occurred, the RCYC relinquished its Admiralty Warrant, although the Club decided to keep its Royal Warrant. The RCYC’s defaced Blue Ensign was flown from the flagstaff at the Clubhouse until 1966, being replaced by the South African national flag.

== Activities ==
The RCYC hosts and organises numerous sailing events, including the Lipton Challenge Cup and South Africa’s premier ocean yacht race, the Cape to Rio.

=== Cape to Rio ===
First undertaken in 1971, the Cape to Rio is the leading South African ocean yacht race and is internationally popular. Held roughly every three years, the Cape to Rio is the only transatlantic race in the Southern Hemisphere and covers nearly 4,000 miles of the South Atlantic Ocean. Although traditionally finishing at Rio de Janeiro in Brazil, two other locations in Brazil and Uruguay have also previously been used.

=== Lipton Challenge Cup ===
Established in 1909, Sir Thomas Lipton donated the Challenge Cup to the then Table Bay Yacht Club so as to foster and encourage yachting in South Africa. The Cup remains an annual inter-club contest that is off-shore during the months of July and August, involving three ‘traditional courses’. The winning club defends the Cup the following year on its home waters. Today, the Lipton Challenge Cup is widely seen as the domestic trophy most South African sailors would most like to win.

=== Other events ===
The Cape Town Race Week, the Myknonos and West Coast Offshore Races, Cape to St Helena, Round Robben Island, and the Cape 31 Regatta, among others, are hosted by the Royal Cape Yacht Club.

For the 2007 America’s Cup qualifying competition, the Louis Vuitton Cup, Team Shosholoza represented the RCYC as their entry, finishing seventh. Given the Club’s favourable location on the southern tip of Africa, the RCYC has been a feature of many international races, such as the Whitbread Race, the BT Global Challenge, the Volvo Race and the Hong Kong Challenge.
