= United Internet Team Germany =

Team Germany

Career
- Yacht club: Deutscher Challenger Yacht Club
- Established: 2005
- Nation: Germany
- Team principal(s): Michael Scheeren
- Skipper: Jesper Bank; Karol Jablonski

Yachts
- Sail no.: Boat name
- GER 89: GER 89
- GER 101: GER 101

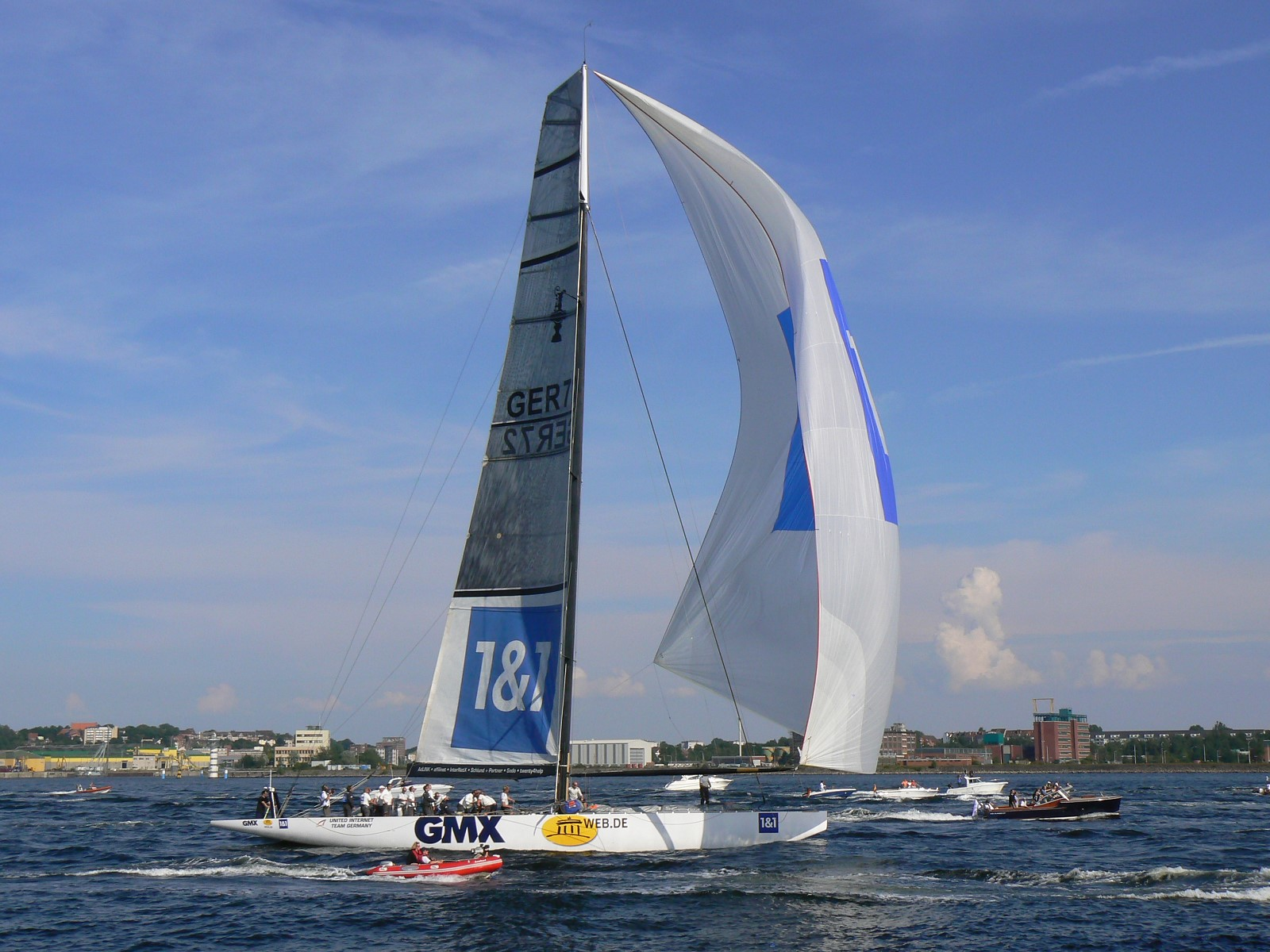
The United Internet Team Germany GER 72 in 2006

United Internet Team Germany is a yacht racing team that competed for the Louis Vuitton Cup 2007, the challenger series held prior to the America's Cup.

== History ==
The United Internet Team Germany represented the Deutscher Challenger Yacht Club, a collective of 42 yacht clubs and organisation in Germany, namely Akademischer Seglerverein zu Hannover, Augsburger Segler-Club, Yacht-Club Bayer Leverkusen, Bayerische Hochseesegler München, Bayerischer Yacht-Club, Yachtclub Berlin-Grünau, Berliner Yacht-Club, Deutsch Schweizerischer Motorboot Club, Deutscher Hochseesportverband Hansa, Deutscher Touring Yacht-Club, Düsseldorfer Yachtclub, Segel-Club Edersee, Wassersportverein Fischbach, Seglervereinigung Flensburg, Flensburger Segel-Club, Hamburger Segel-Club, Heinz Nixdorf Verein zur Förderung des Segelsports, Yacht Club Horn, Jamasutra Hochseesegelsport und Angelverein, Joersfelder Segel-Club, Kieler Yacht-Club, Yacht Club Langenargen, Yachtclub Litzelstetten-Mainau, Lübecker Yacht-Club, Match Race Germany, Mühlenberger Segel-Club, Münchener Ruder- und Segelverein Bayern, Münchner Yacht-Club, Norddeutscher Regatta Verein, Offingen Yacht Club, Olymp-Club Rostock, Ortmühler Regatta Club, Yachtclub Possenhofen, Potsdamer Yacht-Club, Segelclub Rhe, Segler-Verein Schlutup von 1978, Segler Verein Staad, Spandauer Yacht-Club, Studentischer Regatta Verein, Verein Seglerhaus am Wannsee, Warnemünder Segel-Club, and Württembergischer Yacht-Club.

The team participated in the 2007 Louis Vuitton Cup but were eliminated.

They planned to compete in the Louis Vuitton Pacific Series in 2009. However, they withdrew due to financial problems as Audi canceled their sponsorship. In October 2010, the United Internet Team Germany withdrew their intention to participate in the 34th America's Cup, citing a new competition format a reason for the withdrawal.
