= Qingdao International Yacht Club =

- Founded: 2005
- Based in: Qingdao, Shandong, China
- Location: No. 1 Jinwan Road

Qingdao International Yacht Club is a yacht club located in Qingdao, Shandong, China. The yacht club is home to China Team which competed in the 2007 Louis Vuitton Cup to challenge for the America's Cup.
