= Shosholoza =

Traditional Nguni song

"Shosholoza" is an Nguni song that was sung by gold miners in South Africa. It is a mix of Zulu and Ndebele words, and can have various other South African languages thrown in depending on the singers. It was sung by all-male African workers that were performing rhythmical manual labour in the South African mines in a call and response style. The song is so popular in South African culture that it is often referred to as South Africa's second national anthem.

== History ==
"Shosholoza" is a traditional miner's song, originally sung by groups of men from the Ndebele ethnic group that travelled by steam train from their homes in Zimbabwe (formerly known as Rhodesia) to work in South Africa's diamond and gold mines. The Ndebele live predominantly in Zimbabwe near its border with South Africa. The song uses Ndebele words and is Zimbabwean in origin even though the Zulu and Zimbabwean Ndebele ethnic groups are very similar (see Nguni languages).

Some people argue that the song describes the journey to the mines in South Africa, while others say it describes the return to Zimbabwe. It is also sometimes sung "stimela siphume Rhodesia". According to cultural researchers Booth and Nauright, Zulu workers later took up the song to generate rhythm during group tasks and to alleviate boredom and stress. The song was sung by working miners in time with the rhythm of swinging their axes to dig. It was usually sung under hardship in call and response style (one man singing a solo line and the rest of the group responding by copying him). It was also sung by prisoners in call and response style using alto and soprano parts divided by row. The late former South African President Nelson Mandela described how he sang Shosholoza as he worked during his imprisonment on Robben Island. He described it as "a song that compares the apartheid struggle to the motion of an oncoming train" and went on to explain that "the singing made the work lighter".

In contemporary times, it is used in varied contexts in South Africa to show solidarity in sporting events and other national events to relay the message that the players are not alone and are part of a team.

Climate activists made the song the centrepiece of their Occupy COP17 rally on 9 December 2011, the final day of the United Nations climate treaty negotiations. Activists were calling on negotiators to "Stand With Africa" and agree to a legally binding and effective treaty.

== Meaning ==
The song was usually sung to express the hardship of working in the mines. It expresses heartache over the hard work performed in the mines. The word Shosholoza or "tshotsholoza!" means go forward or make way for the next man, in Ndebele. It is used as a term of encouragement and hope for the workers as a sign of solidarity. The sound "sho sho" uses onomatopoeia and reminiscent of the sound made by the steam train (stimela). Stimela is an Nguni word for steam train. "Kulezo ntaba!" means (At those far away mountains), "Stimela Siphuma eZimbabwe" (the train is coming from Zimbabwe), "Wen' uya baleka" (Because you're running away/hurrying). In contemporary times, its meaning is to show support for any struggle.

== Pop culture references ==
The song is also used in pop culture to convey messages of hope and solidarity for athletes during competitions or in other times of hardship and distress.

=== Recordings ===
The song has been recorded by a variety of artists, including Pete Seeger, John Edmond, Helmut Lotti, Ladysmith Black Mambazo, PJ Powers, Soweto Gospel Choir, Peter Gabriel (as the B-side of his single "Biko"), Sérgio Dias and Drakensberg Boys' Choir, as well as being a standard of most gumboots bands, and also featured in the musical 'King Kong' (1959).

=== Rugby World Cup 1995 ===
The song gained further popularity after South Africa won the 1995 Rugby World Cup and is a favourite at sport events in South Africa. It was sung by the then Talk Radio 702 Breakfast Show co-host Dan Moyane. The song was recorded, mastered and released in five days, having been mastered in the UK to get it ready in time for the first game in the 1995 RWC. It was conceptualised and produced by Famous Faces Management's CFF Stuart Lee. The record went gold in sales.

==== Hollywood ====
The South African a cappella group Overtone recorded the song for director Clint Eastwood's movie Invictus (2009).

=== FIFA World Cup 2010 ===
The song was also sung by the South African football team as they came onto the field of play to open the 2010 FIFA World Cup.

=== Who is America ===
Sacha Baron Cohen sings this song in an attempt to calm angry Arizonites who do not welcome a construction of a mosque in their town.

=== Other references ===
The first African challengers for the America's Cup, Team Shosholoza, took their name from the song; as did the Shosholoza Meyl, a long-distance passenger train service operating in South Africa. The song is also used as a campfire song by scouts in South Africa.

== Lyrics ==
The lyrics of the song vary, as do the transcriptions. In the older traditional styles, the words translate to "train from Rhodesia". Such is the version heard in the movie The Gods Must Be Crazy and as sung by Pete Seeger in his album We Shall Overcome. Here is one example:

Example version
Nguni	English translation
Shosholoza	Go forward
Shosholoza	Go forward
Kulezo ntaba	from those mountains
Stimela siphume South Africa	on this train from South Africa
Shosholoza	Go forward
Kulezo ntaba	from those mountains
Stimela siphume South Africa	on this train from South Africa
Wen' uyabaleka	You are running away
Kulezo ntaba	from those mountains
Stimela siphume South Africa	on this train from South Africa

== Soundtracks ==
- "Shosholoza 2010": Listen Up! The Official 2010 FIFA World Cup Album. 2010
- Invictus Soundtrack: Overtone. 2009
- The Drakensberg Boys' Choir: The Very Best of the Drakensberg Boys. DBCS, 2004.
- Ladysmith Black Mambazo: Long Walk to Freedom. Heads Up, 2006.
- Soweto Gospel Choir: African Spirit. Shanachie, 2007.
- Io sto con gli ippopotami soundtrack 1979.
- King Kong (1959 musical), London production, 1961.
- "Shosholoza '99", performed by Ladysmith Black Mambazo for the soundtrack of Brazilian soap opera A Padroeira.
- La Renzo: Shosholoza, 2024.
