= +39 Challenge =

Yacht racing team

Career
- Yacht club: Circolo Vela Gargnano
- Established: 2004
- Nation: Italy
- Team principal(s): Lorenzo Rizzardi
- Skipper: Iain Percy

Yachts
- Sail no.: Boat name
- ITA–85: ITA 85

+39 Challenge was a yacht racing team established in 2004 that competed for the Louis Vuitton Cup 2007, the challenger series held prior to the America's Cup. The teams was based at the Yacht club "Circolo Vela Gargnano" in Gargnano, Italy, and was owned by Lorenzo Rizzardi, the president of the club. Originally named the "Clan Des Team", +39 was the first team to join BMW Oracle Racing on the challenger list for the 2007 America's Cup.

== Prior experience ==
Prior to competing for the Louis Vuitton Cup in 2007, some of the team had previous experience in international yachting as competitors in the Finn class at the 2000 and 2004 Summer Olympics. The skipper, Luca Devoti, and Helmsman Iain Percy (who represented Great Britain), respectively earned the Silver and Gold medals in the Finn class at the 2000 Olympics in Sydney, Australia. Five members of the team also competed at the 2004 Summer Olympics in Athens, Greece, including Spanish silver medallist Rafael Trujillo.

== 2007 Louis Vuitton Cup ==
The +39 Challenge was one of three Italian teams which competed for the 2007 Louis Vuitton Cup in Valencia, Spain. The team placed 9th in the round robins, and did not qualify for the semi-finals. They broke their mast during Act 13, due to an incident caused by United Internet Team Germany, but managed to replace it before the start of Round Robin 2. +39 Challenge were awarded redress against the German team who were found to have broken rules regulating opposite tacks and avoiding contact. +39 Challenge were awarded fifth place in the Act and full costs for the repair of their boat.

== Personnel ==
=== Managers ===
- Team owner : Lorenzo Rizzardi
- Team leader: Cesare Pasotti
- Skipper and technical advisor: Luca Devoti
- Designer: Giovanni Ceccarelli

=== Crew ===
- Helmsman: Iain Percy *Tactician: Ian Walker
- Navigator: Bruno Zirilli
- Afterguard: Andrew Simpson
- Traveller: Gabriele Bruni
- Runners: Anthony Nossiter
- Mainsail Trimmer: Rafael Trujillo
- Main Grinder: Michele Gnutti
- Main & Runners: Karlo Kuret
- Trimmer: Stefano Rizzi
- Trimmer: Christian Scherrer
- Grinder: Chris Brittle
- Grinder: Pawel Bielecki
- Mast: Alejandro Colla
- Mast / Pit: Massimo Galli
- Sewer: Piero Romeo
- Mid-Bow: Corrado Rossignoli
- Bow: Jacek Wisoski

== See also ==
- Italy at the America's Cup
