= China Team =

Chinese yacht racing team

Career
- Yacht club: Qingdao International Yacht Club
- Established: 2005
- Nation: China
- Team principal(s): Chaoyong Wang
- Skipper: Ian Williams

Yachts
- Sail no.: Boat name
- CHN–95: CHN 95

China Team is a yacht racing team formed in 2005. China Team first appeared in competition in the Louis Vuitton Cup 2007, the challenger series held prior to the America's Cup. They had an alliance with French team, Le Défi, increasing their access to craft and knowledge considerably.

In 2008, the team announced World Match Racing Champion Ian Williams as the new skipper and a majority of the French team has been replaced with a fresh group of sailors from five countries.

They competed in the Louis Vuitton Pacific Series in 2009 and will compete in the 2013 America's Cup.

== Team profile ==
Headed by Chaoyong Wang, the China Team are in the process of rebuilding their program and have made numerous changes since America's Cup 32. Stuart James was originally brought in as Chief Marketing Officer, but has since been promoted to Executive Director. The team has added World Match Racing Champion Ian Williams as skipper and replaced most of the French Squad with a multinational contingent representing five countries and numerous America's Cups. The team still features five Chinese sailors with several more working their way through a development program.

The China Team's most significant win in the Louis Vuitton Cup in 2007 came with a surprise showing against America's Cup powerhouse BMW/Oracle. It would be China Team's first and only victory of the competition.

Under the direction of the new management team, Executive Director Stuart James, Principal Ian Charles Stewart and Skipper Ian Williams, entered the program into the 2009 Louis Vuitton Pacific Series. Expectations were low considering the team's poor results from the 2007 LV Cup and that the newly formed team entered the regatta with virtually no practice time.

After losing all four races in the first round robin, the team found their legs in the second round, winning all three of its races and moving into the elimination round against Italy's Luna Rossa. A victory against Luna Rossa would have set up a rematch from the 2007 LV Cup between China Team and BMW/Oracle.

Ian Williams managed to force the Italians into an early penalty prior to the start, but Luna Rossa led at the gun and through the first three marks. Luna Rossa was out in front by 135 meters when they started their penalty turn at the finish line. China Team quickly made up ground and the boats crossed the line side by side. The officials declared Luna Rossa the winner by one second or twenty centimeters.

China Team would finish the regatta in seventh place.

== 2009 Louis Vuitton Pacific Series roster ==
Jim Turner – Mid Grind Mal Parker – Downwind Trimmer Sean Couvreaux – Bow Andy Fethers – Mid-Bow Tom Burham – Pit Mikkel Rossberg – Upwind Trimmer Sean Clarkson – Main Trimmer Ed Smythe – Traveler Wang Jue - Forward Grind Chris Main – Strategist Mark Nichols – Pit/Runner Richard Sydenham – Tactician Simon Shaw – Navigator Wearn Tan - Mast Ian Gordon - Forward Grind Matt Stewart - Aft Grind
