= Union Nationale pour la Course au Large =

- Abbreviation: UNCL
- Predecessor: UNC, GCL
- Successor: Yacht Club de France
- Formation: 1971 (55 years ago)
- Defunct: September 30, 2022
- Type: Yacht club
- Headquarters: Centre Nautique Paris-Boulogne,
- Location(s): Boulogne sur Seine; France
- Coordinates: 48.8344°N 2.2260°E
- Region served: France
- Members: 1000
- Official language: French
- Président: Marc de SAINT DENIS
- Affiliations: Fédération Française de Voile
- Website: http://www.uncl.com/

The Union Nationale pour la Course au Large, also called UNCL, was a French yacht club.

UNCL was established in 1971 through a merger of the Union Nationale des Croiseurs (UNC), and the Groupe des Croiseurs Légers (GCL). UNC itself was formed at Brest in 1913 to organise offshore racing in France as this was outside of the statutes of the Yacht Club de France at that time. GCL had been formed in 1960 by Alain Maupas to organise races for smaller craft.

UNCL organises races around the French coast, including the Trophée Atlantique UNCL and Trophée Méditerranée IRC UNCL, and participates in others.

In co-operation with the British offshore racing club, RORC, UNCL is responsible for the International Rating Certificate (IRC), the principal international handicap system for yacht racing.

Effective September 30, 2022 UNCL was absorbed into the Yacht Club de France.
