= Team Shosholoza =

Yacht racing team

- Team Shosholoza

Career
- Yacht club: Royal Cape Yacht Club
- Established: 2003
- Nation: South Africa
- Team principal(s): Captain Salvatore Sarno
- Skipper: Mark Sadler

Yachts
- Sail no.: Boat name
- RSA–48: RSA 48
- RSA–83: RSA 83

Team Shosholoza is a yacht racing team representing Royal Cape Yacht Club of Cape Town, South Africa, competing in the 2007 America's Cup.

The name Shosholoza refers to a popular South African indigenous song and is used in an attempt to encompass the African spirit of "pushing and pulling together".

== History ==
The team's history goes back to when Ian Ainslie taught sailing skills to underprivileged youngsters in the navy village of Simon's Town and Captain Salvatore Sarno asked them to crew his Durban yacht. As the team improved the Captain began to talk about the America's Cup.

Soon he had bought RSA 48 and the team was practicing out of the Waterfront in Cape Town.

In 2009, they competed in the Louis Vuitton Pacific Series, where they defeated defending champions Alinghi on the last day of the regatta's first round robin.

== Boats ==
Shosholoza currently owns two IACC Yachts. RSA 48 was bought for training purposes. The team was the first syndicate to build a boat, RSA 83, for the 2007 America's Cup.
