= John Cutler (sailor) =

New Zealand sailor

Medal record

Men's sailing

Representing New Zealand

Olympic Games
Bronze medal – third place	1988 Seoul	Finn class

John Cutler (born 8 June 1962) is a competitive sailor for New Zealand who won a bronze medal in the Finn Class at the 1988 Olympic Games in Seoul. He was also selected for the 1992 Summer Olympics in Barcelona and was a sailing coach for the New Zealand team at the 1996 Summer Olympics in Atlanta. Cutler has subsequently competed for a number of different syndicates in the America's Cup. He was born in Manchester, England.

He sailed for ALL4ONE Challenge in the 2010 Louis Vuitton Trophy Dubai.

== Current – 2015 ==
- Tactician on J Class Lionheart
- Coach for Yachting New Zealand – Finn Class

== Sailing regatta highlights ==
- Cope del Rey 2014 “Bella Mente” – 2nd
- Palma Vela Mini Maxi 2013 “Bella Mente” – Winner
- Rolex Maxi World Championship 2012 “Bella Mente” – Winner
- J Class Falmouth Regatta 2012 “Ranger” – Winner
- Eight Meter World Champion 2011 “Hollandia” – Winner
- Rolex Giraglia Inshore Series 2011 “Pace” – 2nd
- Copa Del Rey TP52 2008 “Desafio” – Winner
- Two time winner of the Admirals Cup (Dutch Team and US Team)
- Mumm 36 World Champion
- Three time World Match Racing champion
- Bronze Medal −1988 Olympics, Finn class

== America's Cup ==
- Tactician and Technical Director with Desafío Español for America's Cup 33 until syndicate ended May 2009
- Tactician and Technical Director with Desafío Español for America's Cup 32 (2007) Louis Vuitton Cup Semi-Finalist
- Tactician and Sailing Director with Oracle BMW Racing for America's Cup 31 (2003) Louis Vuitton Cup Finalist
- Helmsman with America True for America's Cup 30 (2000) Louis Vuitton Cup Semi-Finalist
- Helmsman with Nippon Challenge for America's Cup 29 (1995) Louis Vuitton Cup Semi-Finalist
- Tactician with Nippon Challenge for America's Cup 28 (1992) Louis Vuitton Cup Semi-Finalist

== Other ==
- Co-Author “Understanding Match Racing” (North Sails CD) now in its fourth edition
- Authored rules and tactics for Virtual Spectator (America's Cup 30 & 31)
- Coach – New Zealand Olympic Sailing Team Barcelona (1992) and Atlanta (1996).
