= Victory Challenge =

Swedish yacht racing team

Career
- Yacht club: Gamla Stans Yacht Sällskap
- Established: 2001
- Nation: Sweden
- Team principal(s): Hugo Stenbeck
- Skipper: Magnus Holmberg

Yachts
- Sail no.: Boat name
- SWE–38: Christina
- SWE–63: Örn
- SWE–73: Orm
- SWE–96: Järv

Victory Challenge was a Swedish yacht racing team that competed in 2003 America's Cup and 2007 America's Cup. The team was initiated in 1999 by Swedish businessman Jan Stenbeck, and after his death in August 2002, his son Hugo Stenbeck took over.

They also participated in the Louis Vuitton Cup 2007, the challenger selection series held prior to the 2007 America's Cup. It was sponsored primarily by Red Bull.

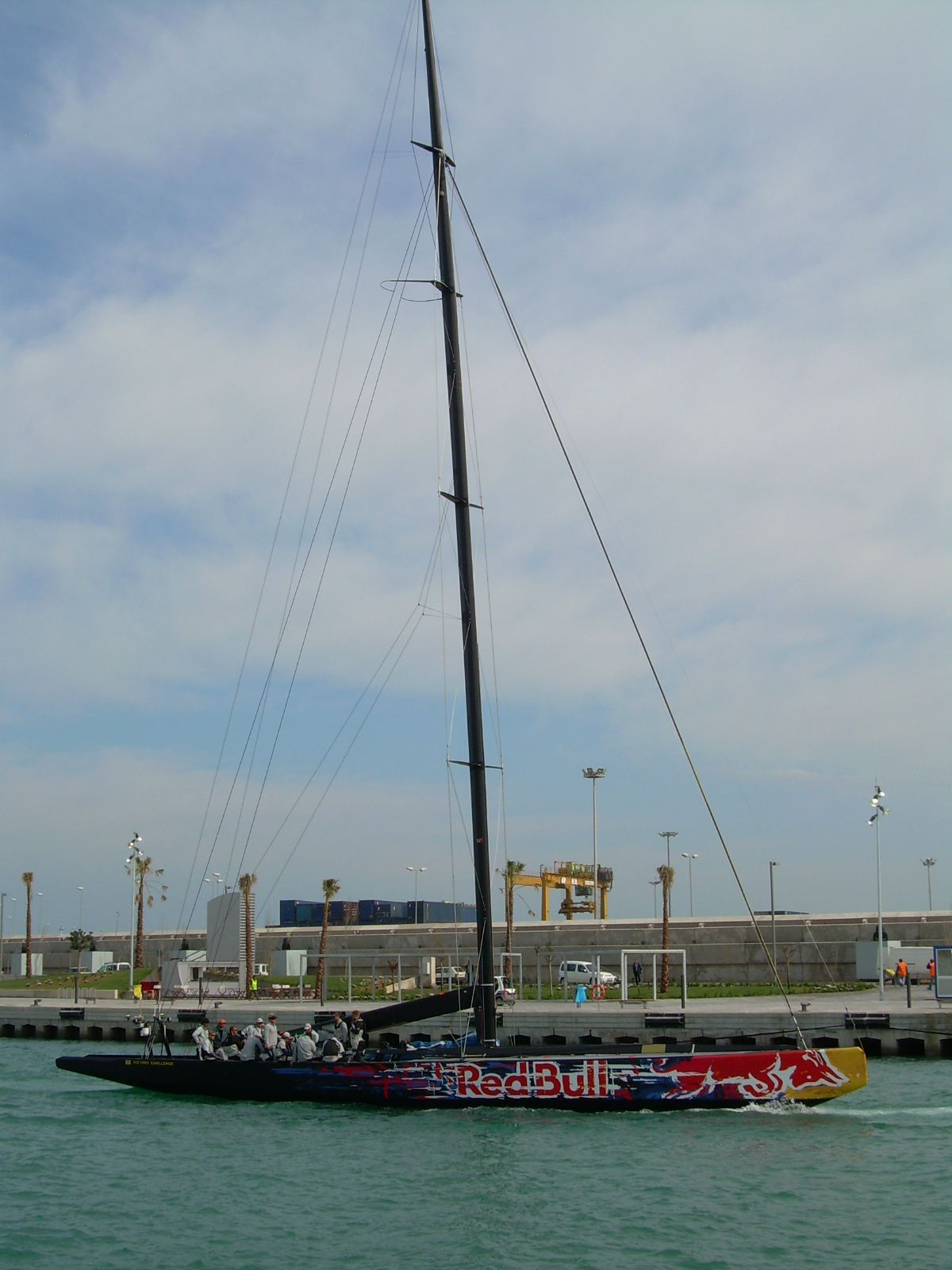
America´s Cup 2006–07, Victory Challenge

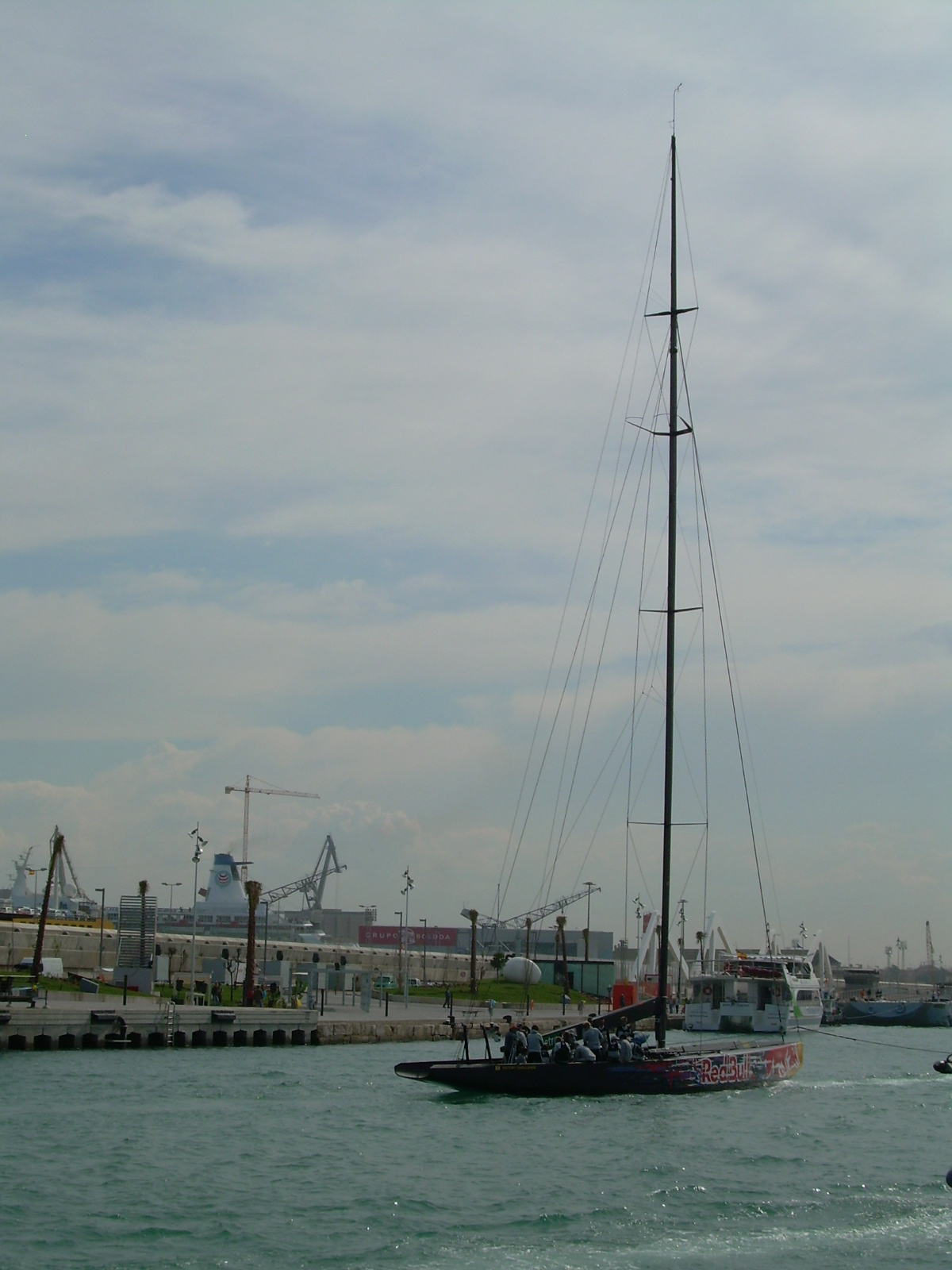
Victory Challenge's team. America´s Cup 2006–07

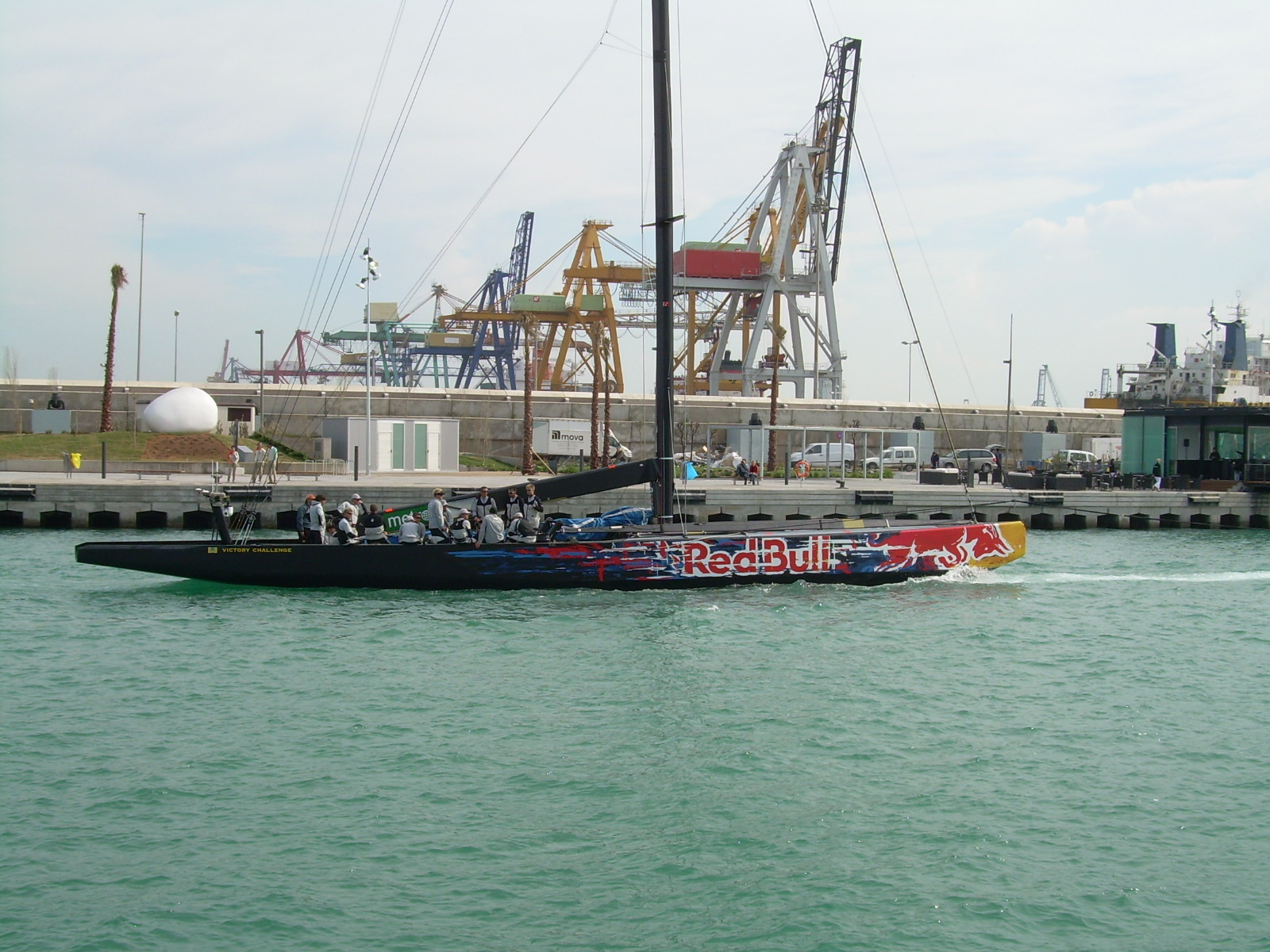
Victory Challenge team. America´s Cup 2006–07

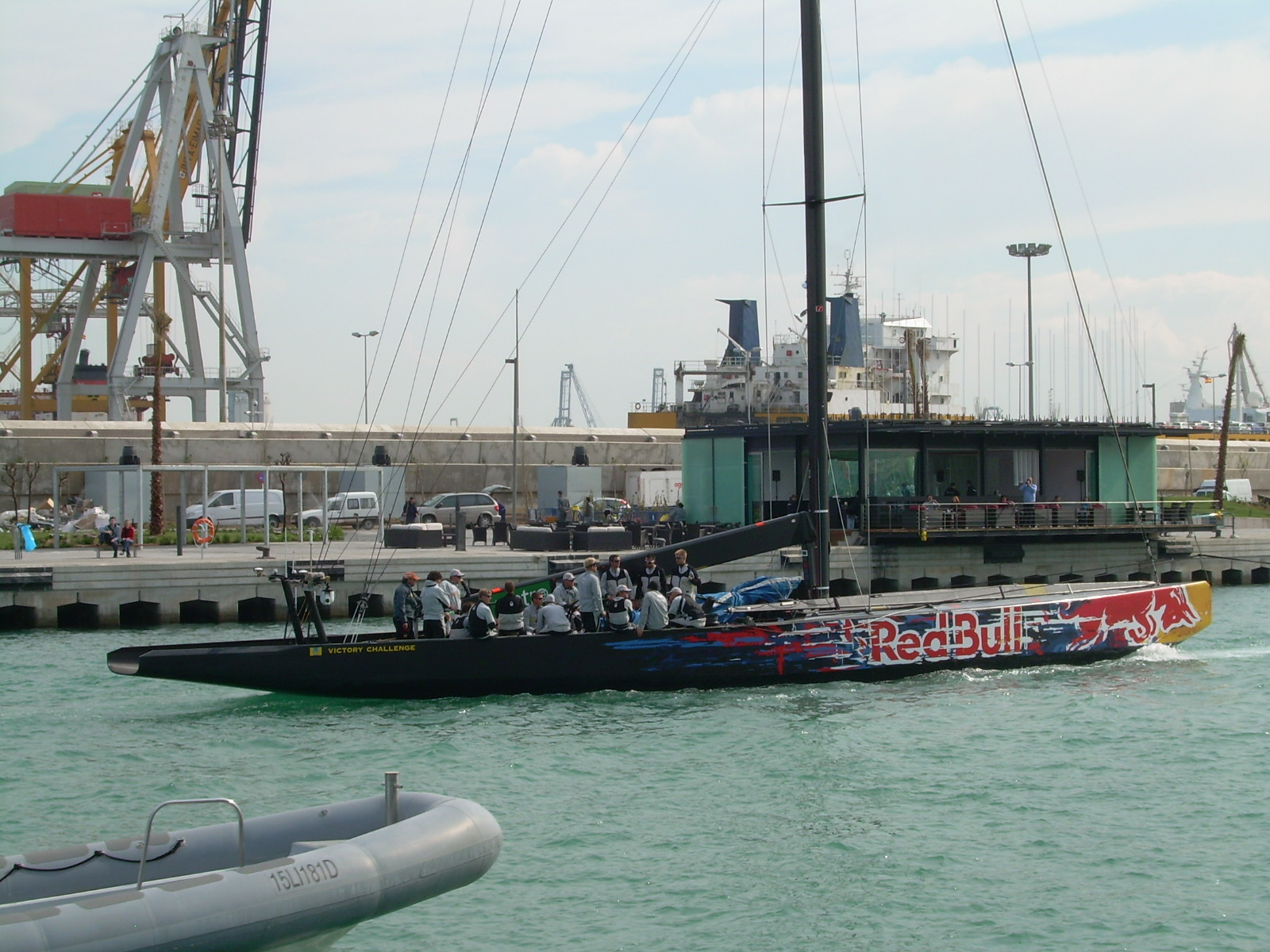
America´s Cup Valencia, Spain. 2006–07. Victory Challenge.
