= Etchells World Championship =

List of sailing championships

The Etchells World Championship is an annual international sailing regatta for Etchells keelboats, organized by the host club on behalf of the Etchells Class Association and recognized by World Sailing, the sports IOC recognized governing body. The Class gained World Sailing status on 1 August 1974.

== Events ==
Edition			Host			Boat	Sailors					Ref
No.	Date	Year	Host club	Location	Nat.	Boat	No.			Nat.	Cont.	Ref
1	18-21 Sep	1975	Eastern Yacht Club, Marblehead	Marblehead, Massachusetts	United States	26	78			4	3	
2	9-12 Sep	1976	Ida Lewis Yacht Club	Newport, Rhode Island	United States	32	96			2	2	
3	18 Sep	1978		Palm Beach, New South Wales	Australia	42	126			3	3	
4	11-19 Sep	1978	Newport Harbor Yacht Club	Balboa, California	United States	39	117			4	2	
5	20-26 Aug	1979	Royal Canadian Yacht Club	Toronto, Ontario	Canada	45	135			4	3	
6		1980	Royal Prince Alfred Yacht Club	Brighton, Victoria	Australia	35	207			2	2	
7	-09-04 to 09-12	1981	Eastern Yacht Club	Marblehead, Massachusetts	United States	69	105			6	4	
8	1-9 Sep	1982	St. Francis Yacht Club	San Francisco, California	United States	41	123			5	4	
9		1983		Rye	United States	60	180			5	3	
10	-11-26 to 12-04	1984	Royal Sydney Yacht Squadron	Sydney	Australia	63	189			5	3	
11	17-24 Aug	1985	Newport Harbor Yacht Club	Balboa, California	United States	55	165			4	2	
12	10-21 Sep	1986	Royal Canadian Yacht Club	Toronto	Canada							
13		1987		Marblehead, Massachusetts	United States							
14	-01-11 to 01-22	1988	Royal Prince Alfred Yacht Club	Newport, New South Wales	Australia	59	177			4	3	
15	4-12 Aug	1989	San Diego Yacht Club	San Diego, California	United States	56	168			4	3	
16	6-12 jAN	1990	Royal Perth Yacht Club & Royal Fresh Water Bay Yacht Club	Fremantle	Australia	55	165			7	4	
17	08-18 Aug	1991	San Francisco Yacht Club	San Francisco, California	United States	38	114			6	4	
18	17-27 Sep	1992	Larchmont Yacht Club	Larchmont, New York	United States	66	198			7	4	
19	18-27 Nov	1993	Royal Queensland Yacht Squadron	Brisbane, Queensland	Australia	78	234			5	3	
20		1994		Balboa, California	United States							
21	10-15 Jan	1995	Royal Brighton Yacht Club	Middle Brighton, Victoria	Australia	49	147			3	3	
22	17-28 Jun	1996	Royal Yacht Squadron	Cowes, Isle of Wight	United Kingdom	64	192			8	4	
23	5-16 Nov	1997	Royal Hong Kong Yacht Club	Hong Kong	Hong Kong	30	92			6	4	
24	10-20 Sep	1998	Eastern Yacht Club, Marblehead	Marblehead, Massachusetts	United States	100	300			5	3	
25	16-22 Jan	2000	Royal Prince Alfred Yacht Club	Newport, NSW	Australia	68	204			4	3	
26	21Aug -1Sep	2000	San Diego Yacht Club	San Diego	United States	74	226			7	4	
27	24Aug -2Sep	2001	Royal Lymington Yacht Club	Lymington	United Kingdom	61	185			9	4	
28	2-12 Nov	2002	Gulf Harbour Yacht Club	Gulf Harbour	New Zealand	98	294			9	4	
29	18-27 Sep	2003	Indian Harbor Yacht Club & Riverside Yacht Club	Greenwich, CT	United States	93	279			8	4	
30	7 -8Aug	2004	Mooloolaba Yacht Club	Mooloolaba, Maroochydore, Queensland	Australia	85	261			8	4	
31	1-11 Sep	2005	Richmond Yacht Club, California	Point Richmond, Richmond, California	United States	72	221			9	5	
32	11 -25Nov	2006	Royal Perth Yacht Club	Crawley, Perth. WA	Australia	69	213			9	4	
33	22-30 Jun	2007	Royal Corinthian Yacht Club of Cowes	Cowes, Isle of Wight	United Kingdom	45	135			8	4	
34	19-29 Jun	2008	Chicago Yacht Club, Belmont	Chicago	United States	83	265			9	3	
35	5-14 Mar	2009	Royal Brighton Yacht Club	Brighton, Victoria	Australia	85	266			8	4	
36	23-28 Aug	2010	Howth Yacht Club	Howth, Dublin	Ireland	43	134			9	4	
37	5-11 Jun	2011	San Diego Yacht Club	San Diego	United States	81	257			9	3	
38	20-25 Feb	2012	Royal Sydney Yacht Squadron	Kirribilli, Sydney	Australia	74	241			9	4	
39	10-15 Jun	2013	Yacht Club Cala de’ Medici	Rosignano Solvay	Italy	41	123			11	3	
40	21-28 Jun	2014	New York Yacht Club, Newport	Newport, Rhode Island	United States	95	299			11	4	
41	1-7 Nov	2015	Royal Hong Kong Yacht Club		Hong Kong	43	129			10	4	
42	31Aug -10Sep	2016	Royal London Yacht Club	Cowes	United Kingdom	58	174			12	5	
43	22-30 Sep	2017	San Francisco Yacht Club	San Francisco	United States	51	153			10	4	
44	18-27 Oct	2018	Royal Queensland Yacht Squadron	Manly, Brisbane, Queensland	Australia	94	282			7	5	
45	20-29 Jun	2019	Corpus Christi Yacht Club	Corpus Christi, Texas	United States	37	111			6	4	
N/A	21-27 Nov	2020	Royal Freshwater Bay Yacht Club	Peppermint Grove, Perth. WA	Australia	DELAYED DUE TO COVID						
N/A		2021	Royal Freshwater Bay Yacht Club	Peppermint Grove, Perth. WA	Australia	CANCELLED DUE TO COVID						
46	19-24 Sep	2022	Royal Yacht Squadron	Cowes, Isle of Wight	United Kingdom	42	126			9	4	
47	16-21 Apr	2023	Biscayne Bay Yacht Club / Coral Reef Yacht Club	Miami, Florida	United States	62				14+	5	
48	18-22 Mar	2024	Fremantle Sailing Club	Fremantle, Western Australia	Australia	40	130	126	4	10	4	
49	10-14 Jan	2025	Royal Brighton Yacht Club	Brighton, Victoria	Australia	46	152	139	13	8	4	

== Multiple World Champions ==
Ranking	Sailor	Gold	Silver	Bronze	Total	No. Entries*	Ref.
1	David Curtis (USA)	7	6	1	14	18	
2	James Pollard (USA)	5	1	1	7	16	
3	Colin Smith (AUS)	3	1	0	4	7	
3	Robert Shattuck (25x17px)	3	1	0	4	5	
5	Steven Shore (USA)	3	0	2	5	7	
6	Bill Kelly (USA)	3	0	0	3	5	
8	Dirk Kneulman (CAN)	2	2	0	4	23	
9	David Curtis (AUS)	2	1	2	5	6	
10	Dennis Durgan (USA)	2	1	0	3	10	
10	Richard Howard (AUS)	2	1	0	3	3	
12	John Stanley (AUS)	2	0	3	5	15	
13	Andrew Plympton (AUS)	2	0	2	4	14	
14	Paul Kelly (GBR)	2	0	1	3	5	
14	John Stanley (AUS)	2	0	1	3	11	
14	Iain Murray (AUS)	2	0	1	3	10	
17	Stuart Ash (GBR)	2	0	0	2	9	
17	Simon Pender (GBR)	2	0	0	2	5	
17	Bruce Ritchie (USA)	2	0	0	2	10	

- Full results do not exist for some years so this is an under estimation.

== Medalists ==
Year	Gold	Silver	Bronze	Ref
1975	US 152 - Noni Randy Bartholomew (USA); UNKNOWN; UNKNOWN	US 141 George Hinman (USA); William Kelly (USA); UNKNOWN	US 92 Peter Godfrey (USA); UNKNOWN; UNKNOWN	
1976	US 62 - Big Red; David Curtis (USA); Bob Danforth (USA); UNKNOWN	US 152 - Noni; J.R. Bartholomew (USA); UNKNOWN; UNKNOWN	KA 16 - Manatee; Bruce J. Ritchie (AUS); UNKNOWN; UNKNOWN	
1977	KA 68 - Arunga II Frank Tolhurst (AUS); Norman Hyett (AUS); John Stanley (AUS)	KA 59; Peter O'Donnell (AUS); UNKNOWN; UNKNOWN	KA 85; Carl Ryves (AUS); UNKNOWN; UNKNOWN	
1978	US 355 - Close Encounters David Curtis (USA); Robert McCann (USA); Robbie Haines (USA)	US 136 Rick Howard (USA); Judson Smith (USA); John Nystedt (USA)	US 92 Peter Godfrey (USA); Dick Kaseler (USA); James Hardenbergh (USA)	
1979	KA 98 - Early Bird John Savage (AUS); Stephen Wheeler (AUS); Andrew Buckland (AUS)	US 466; David Curtis (USA) Bob McCann (USA); Peter Warren (USA)	US 355 Tim Hogan (USA); Brooks Benjamin (USA); Scott Ramser (USA)	
1980	KA 59 - Impala Peter O'Donnell (AUS); Richard Coxon (AUS); Dick Lawson (AUS)	US 466 David Curtis (USA); UNKNOWN; UNKNOWN	KA 98; John Savage (AUS) UNKNOWN; UNKNOWN	
1981	US 500 - Whip David Curtis (USA); Bob McCann (USA); James Hardenbergh (USA)	KA 59 Peter O'Donnell (AUS); Richard Coxon (AUS); R. Lawson (AUS)	US 125 Don Bever (USA); Richard Lavelli (USA); Chris Drake (USA)	
1982	US 500 - Whip; David Curtis (USA); Bruce Dyson (USA); James Hardenbergh (USA)	US 273; Ben Altman (USA) Russ Silvestri (USA); Craig Lyons (USA)	KA 148; Barry Nesbitt (AUS) Phil Smidmore (AUS); Colin Bate (AUS)	
1983 Rye; United States; 60 Boats	US 500 - Whip; David Curtis (USA) Bob McCann (USA); James Hardenbergh (USA)	KC 43; Dirk Kneulman (CAN); UNKNOWN; UNKNOWN	KA 156; David Forbes (AUS); UNKNOWN; UNKNOWN	
1984 Sydney; Australia; 63 Boats	KA 189 - Kookaburra Iain Murray (AUS); Peter Gilmour (AUS); Paul Westlake (AUS)	US 662 David Curtis (USA); Bruce Dyson (USA); James Hardenbergh (USA)	KA 179 Phil Thompson (AUS); Andrew York (AUS); Graeme Ellis (AUS)	
1985 Balboa; United States; 55 Boats	US 663 - Whip David Curtis (USA); Bob McCann (USA); James Hardenbergh (USA)	US 661 Dave Ullman (USA); Jack Jakosky (USA); Tony Wattson (USA)	KA 30 Jamie Wilmot (AUS); Robert Swan (AUS); Steve Gosline (AUS)	
1986 Toronto; Canada ? Boats	US - Firing Line Bruce Burton (USA); Glen Burton (USA); UNKNOWN	Judson Smith (USA); UNKNOWN; UNKNOWN	Argyle Campbell (USA); UNKNOWN; UNKNOWN	
1987 Marblehead; United States ? Boats	US - Firing Line Bruce Burton (USA); Glen Burton (USA); Chris Lucander (USA)	David Curtis (USA) UNKNOWN; UNKNOWN	Bill Critch; UNKNOWN; UNKNOWN	
1988 Newport; Australia; 59 Boats	KA 242 - Lethal Weapon John Savage (AUS); Andrew Plympton (AUS); Peter Gillon (AUS)	US 703 David Curtis (USA); Wally Corwin (USA); Robert Billingham (USA)	KA 248 Phil Thompson (AUS); Graeme Ellis (AUS); David Giles (AUS)	
1989 San Diego; United States; 56 Boats	US 790 Larry Klein (USA); Butch Richardson (USA); Ron Rosenberg (USA)	US 670 David Curtis (USA); Jud Smith (USA); Brad Dellenbaugh (USA)	US 640; Jim Buckingham (USA) Scott Mason (USA); Rich Gadbois (USA)	
1990 Fremantle; Australia; 55 Boats	K68 - The Ashes Chris Law (GBR); Robert Billingham (USA); Aran Hanson (USA)	US 643 - Menace X Dennis Conner (USA); Andreas Josenhans (CAN); Bill Munster (USA)	KA 295 - Fury Peter Gilmour (AUS); Grant Davidson (AUS); Steve Jarvin (AUS)	
1991 San Francisco; Australia; 38 Boats	US 873 - Menace X Dennis Conner (USA); Bill Munster (USA); Norm Reynolds (USA)	US 706 - Slipknot Peter Isler (USA); Robert Billingham (USA); Bob Foder (USA)	US 529 - Satisfaction Jeff Madrigali (USA); Jorge Lee (USA); Jeff Wayne (USA)	
1992 Larchmont; United States; 66 Boats	USA 909 - Whip David Curtis (USA); James Hardenbergh (USA); Tom Olsen (USA)	KC 54 - Boat Erik Koppernaes (CAN); Larry Creaser (CAN); Gavin Flinn (CAN)	US 790 - Lunkmeyer Larry Klien (USA) ??? Buras (USA); Ron Rosenberg (USA)	
1993 Brisbane; Australia; 78 Boats	AUS 326 - The Boat Colin Beashel (AUS); David Giles (AUS); Richard Uechtritz (AUS)	AUS 294 - Golden Parachute Ian Brown (AUS); Barry Watson (AUS); John Dorling (AUS)	AUS 348 - Two Saints & a Magpie John Bertrand (AUS); Bill Browne (AUS); Ernest Lawrence (AUS)	
1994 Balboa; United States ? Boats	USA; Dennis Conner (USA) Brad Rodi (USA); Steven Jarvin (AUS)	USA Judson Smith (USA); UNKNOWN; UNKNOWN	USA David Curtis (USA); UNKNOWN; UNKNOWN	
1995 Brighton; Australia; 49 Boats	AUS 372 Colin Beashel (AUS); David Giles (AUS); Richard Uechtritz (AUS)	AUS 333 Cameron Miles (AUS); James Mayjor (AUS); Chris Links (AUS)	AUS 359 Peter Chappell (AUS); Graham Johnson (AUS); Stuart Skiggs (AUS)	
1996	GBR 117 - Yes! Adam Gosling (GBR); David Howlett (GBR); Mark Covell (GBR)	USA 63 - Danger One Judson Smith (USA); David Rose (USA); Steven Backhouse (AUS)	AUS 384 - No Jacket Required Peter Conde (AUS); Brian Hillier (BER); Myles Baron-Hay (AUS)	
1997	DEN 1067 Poul Richard Hoj-Jensen (DEN); Paul Blowers (GBR); Steve Mitchell (GBR)	AUS 372 Colin Beashel (AUS); Richard Uechtritz (AUS); David Giles (AUS)	AUS 379 Noel Drennan (AUS); Nick Williams (AUS); Wayne Johnstone (AUS)	
1998	CAN 69 Dirk Kneulman (CAN); Paul Sustronk (CAN); Alan Harvey (CAN)	NZL 300 Russell Coutts (NZL); Brad Butterworth (NZL); Matt Mason (NZL)	USA 1073 Peter Duncan (USA); Thomas Blackwell (USA); William Barton (USA)	
1999	AUS 420 - Green Steam Cameron Miles (AUS); James Mayo (AUS); Andrew Palfrey (AUS)	AUS 424 - The bluntest tool in the shed Ian Walker (AUS); Nick Williams (AUS); Matt Wenke (AUS)	AUS 337 - Tom Pepper XVIII Peter Mcneill (AUS); William Wawn (AUS); James Mayjor (AUS)	
2000	USA 1000 Vincent Brun (USA); Bill Bennett (USA); Rick Merriman (USA)	USA 986 - 59 Bruce Nelson (USA); Jon Rogers (USA); Mike Dorgan (USA)	USA 706 - 13 Peter Isler (USA); Steve Grillon (USA); Artie Means (USA)	
2001	GBR 987 - Bedrock (5) Stuart Childerley (GBR); Simon Russell (GBR); Nicholas Pearson (GBR)	AUS 1187 - Pacesetter (14) Cameron Miles (AUS); Phillip Smidmore (AUS); James Mayo (AUS)	GBR 1195 - Danish Blue (16) Poul Richard Høj-Jensen (DEN); Paul Blowers (GBR); Steve Mitchell (GBR)	
2002	GBR 987 (56) - Bedrock Stuart Childerley (GBR); Simon Russell (GBR); Roger Marino (USA)	AUS 874 - 31 Mark Bradford (AUS); Mike O'Brien (AUS); Gary Adshead (AUS)	AUS 650 - 11 Cameron Miles (AUS); Phillip Smidmore (AUS); James Mavior (AUS)	
2003	USA 1262 - USA 8 Ken Read (USA); Karl Anderson (USA); Scott Norris (USA)	USA 1221 - USA 21 Judson Smith (USA); Henry Frazer (USA); Andrew Wills (USA)	AUS 1271 - AUS Pittwater Cameron Miles (AUS); Phillip Smidmore (AUS); James Mayjor (AUS)	
2004	AUS 915 Peter McNeill (AUS); Paul Turner (AUS); Greg Torpy (AUS)	AUS 509 Cameron Miles (AUS); Chris Links (AUS); David Sampson (AUS)	AUS 1117 Glenn Collings (AUS); Steve Young (USA); Jake Gunther (AUS)	
2005	USA 928 Tito Gonzalez (CHI); Bill Mauk (USA); Jeff Linton (USA); Diego Gonzales (CHI)	USA 1278 - 71 Samuel Kahn (USA); Bill Lee (USA); Jeff Madrigali (USA); Adrian Finglas (USA)	AUS 1223 - 13 Iain Murray (AUS); George Szabo (USA); Andrew Palfrey (AUS)	
2006	USA 1061 Judson Smith (USA); Dirk Kneulman (CAN); Andrew Wills (USA); Thomas Saunders (NZL)	NZL 950 Alastair Gair (NZL); David Ridley (NZL); Carl Peters (NZL); Derek Scott (NZL)	GBR 1333 Ante Razmilovic (GBR); Jez Fanstone (GBR); Stuart Flinn (GBR)	
2007	GBR 1361 - Dawn Raid Andy Beadsworth (GBR); Oscar Strugstad (GBR); Simon Fry (GBR)	USA 1351 - Daddy's Girl; Judson Smith (USA); David Mcclintock (USA); Stephen Girling (USA)	GBR 1333 - Swedish Blue; Ante Razmilovic (GBR); Jez Fanstone (GBR); Stuart Flinn (GBR)	
2008	USA 979 Bill Hardesty (USA); Erik Shampain (USA); Steven Hunt (USA); Jennifer Wilson (USA)	USA 969; Chris Busch (USA); Chad Hough (USA); Chuck Sinks (USA); Peter Burton (USA)	USA 102; Judson Smith (USA); Henry Frazer (USA); James Porter (USA)	
2009	AUS 874 Jason Muir (AUS); Matthew Chew (AUS); Paul Wyatt (AUS); Bucky Smith (AUS)	AUS 924 - 4 Damien King (AUS); Simon Cunnington (AUS); James Ware (AUS); Andrew Butler (AUS)	AUS 1383 - 54; John Bertrand (AUS); Andrew Palfrey (AUS); Ben Ainslie (GBR)	
2010	AUS 1383 - Triad John Bertrand (AUS); Andrew Palfrey (AUS); Tom Slingsby (AUS)	GBR 1333 - Swedish Blue Ante Razmilovic (GBR); Mike Wolfs (CAN); Chris Larson (USA)	AUS 924 - barry Damien King (AUS); Simon Cunnington (AUS); Andrew Butler (AUS); James Ware (AUS)	
2011	USA 979 Bill Hardesty (USA); Steven Hunt (USA); Maind Markee (USA); Craig Leweck (USA)	AUS 1026; Noel Drennan (AUS); Anthony Nossiter (AUS); William Mccarthy (AUS)	USA 1227; Vincent Brun (USA); Ben Mitchell (USA); Brad Rodi (USA); Johannes Mcelvain (USA)	
2012	AUS 925 - IRON LOTUS Tom King (AUS); Ivan Wheen (AUS); Owen McMahon (AUS); David Edwards (AUS)	AUS 947 - MAGPIE Graeme Taylor (AUS); Steven Jarvin (AUS); Grant Simmer (AUS)	AUS 1383 - TRIAD John Bertrand (AUS); Tom Slingsby (AUS); David Giles (AUS)	
2013	USA 1378 - The Martian Marvin Beckmann (USA); Steven Hunt (USA); Ezra Culver (USA)	USA 1397 - Raging Rooster Peter Duncan (USA); Judson Smith (USA); Thomas Blackwell (USA)	HKG 1333 - Swedish Blue Ante Razmilovic (GBR); Chris Larson (USA); Stuart Flinn (GBR)	
2014	USA 979 (79) - Line Honors Bill Hardesty (USA); Taylor Canfield (ISV); Stephanie Roble (USA); Marcus Eagan (USA)	HKG 1333 (33) - Swedish Blue Ante Razmilovic (GBR); Chris Larson (USA); Stuart Flinn (GBR)	USA 1378 (78) - The Martian Marvin Beckmann (USA); Steven Hunt (USA); Ezra Culver (USA)	
2015	USA 1372 - Aretas Skip Dieball (USA); Jon McClean (USA); Jeff Eiber (USA)	USA 1262 - SCIMITAR Stephen Benjamin (USA); George Peet (USA); Luke Lawrence (USA); Mei han Cheung (HKG)	Magpie AUS 947 25 Graeme Taylor (AUS); Grant Simmer (AUS); Steven Jarvin (AUS)	
2016	AUS 1383 - Triad2 John Bertrand (AUS); Paul Blowers (GBR); Ben Lamb (AUS)	USA 1262 - Scimitar Stephen Benjamin (USA); Michael Menninger (USA); Ian Liberty (USA); George Peet (USA)	SIN 1333 - Matatu Noel Drennan (AUS); Brian Hammersley (GBR); Andrew Mills (GBR)	
2017	USA 1427 - Stella Blue Stephen Benjamin (USA); David Hughes (USA); Ian Liberty (USA); Michael Menninger (USA)	AUS 947 - Magpie Graeme Taylor (AUS); James Mayo (AUS); Steven Jarvin (AUS)	USA 1349 - KGB Senet Bischoff (USA); Benjamin Kinney (USA); Clay Bischoff (USA)	
2018	AUS 1449 - Lisa Rose Martin Hill (AUS); Sean O'Rourke (AUS); Julian Plante (AUS); Mathew Belcher (AUS)	HKG 1406 - Racer C Mark Thornburrow (HKG) Mike Huang (USA); Alexander Conway (AUS); Will Ryan (AUS)	AUS 864 - Gen XY; Matthew Chew (AUS) Brian Donovan (AUS); Benjamin Vercoe (AUS); Ashley Deeks (AUS)	
2019	AUS 1461 - Havoc; Iain Murray (AUS); Colin Beashel (AUS); Richard Allanson (AUS)	AUS 1447 - Magpie; Graeme Taylor (AUS); James Mayo (AUS); Tom Slingsby (AUS)	USA1427 - Stella Blue; Stephen Benjamin (USA); Michael Menninger (USA); Ian Liberty (USA); Jonathan Goldsberry (USA)	
2022	GBR 1438 (38) - Swedish Blue; Ante Razmilovic (GBR); Brian Hammersley (GBR); Noel Drennan (AUS)	NZL 1499 (99) - New Order; Anatole Masfen (NZL); Dirk Kneulman (CAN); Simon Cooke (NZL)	GBR 1502 (2) - Mila; Lawrie Smith (GBR); Richard Parslow (GBR); Gonçalo Almeida Ribeiro (POR); Ben Saxton (GBR)	
2023	USA 1477 (77) - Veracity; John Sommi (USA); Victor Diaz De Leon (VEN); Will Ryan (AUS); Rebecca Anderson (USA)	USA 1511 (17) - TONS OF STEEL; Stephen Benjamin (USA); Michael Buckley (USA); Ian Liberty (USA); David Hughes (USA)	USA 1504 (4) - Lifted; Jim Cunningham (USA); Steven Hunt (USA); Erik Shampain (USA); Serena Vilage (USA)	
2024	AUS 1486 (15) - Magpie; Graeme Taylor (AUS); James Mayo (AUS); Richard Allanson (AUS)	USA 1494 (23) - AMac; Andy Beadsworth (GBR); Brian Ledbetter (USA); Ben Lamb (AUS)	GBR 1490 (6) - No Dramas; Graham Vials (GBR); Billy Russell (GBR); Andrew Lawson (GBR)	
2025	AUS-1486 (15) - Magpie; Graeme Taylor (AUS); Ben Lamb (AUS); James Mayo (AUS)	USA-1473 (73) - DanEgerous; John Dane III (USA); Eric Doyle (USA); Bill Hardesty (USA)	AUS-1518 (42) - Flying Higher; Jeanne-Claude Strong (AUS); Seve Jarvin (AUS); Max Jameson (NZL); Sam Newton (AUS)	
2026	AUS 1526 Magpie James Mayo (AUS); Paul Cayard (USA); Ben Lamb (USA)	USA 1519 Rogue; Scott Kaufman (USA); Goncalo Riberio (USA); Lucas Calabrese (ARG); Hugo Rocha (USA)	USA 1529 Encore; John Sommi (USA); Will Ryan (AUS); Victor Diaz de Leon (USA); Beccy Anderson (USA)	
