= 1999 Star World Championships =

International sailing regatta

The 1999 Star World Championships were held in Punta Ala, Italy between September 1 and 12, 1999.

== Results ==
Results of individual races
Pos	Crew	Country	I	II	III	IV	V	VI	Tot	Pts
Gold medal	Eric Doyle (H); Tom Olsen	United States	4	3	9	17	4	4	41	24
Silver medal	Ross MacDonald (H); Kai Bjorn	Canada	10	1	4	130; DSQ	10	1	156	26
Bronze medal	Mark Reynolds (H); Magnus Liljedahl	United States	15	17	2	1	33	2	70	37
4	Vincent Hoesch (H); Florian Fendt	Germany	16	6	7	15	1	11	56	40
5	Alexander Hagen (H); Carsten Witt	Germany	26	5	21	3	12	19	86	60
6	Mats Johansson (H); Leif Möller	Sweden	21	26	13	11	13	6	90	64
7	Ian Walker (H); Mark Covell	Great Britain	3	16	3	19	35	27	103	68
8	Pietro D'Alì (H); Ferdinando Colaninno	Italy	17	19	5	29	3	26	99	70
9	José Maria van der Ploeg (H); Rafael van der Ploeg	Spain	130; DSQ	11	11	8	25	16	201	71
10	Howard Shiebler (H); Rick Peters	United States	5	8	39	130; DSQ	9	12	203	73
11	Vincent Brun (H); Rodrigo Meirleles	United States	22	15	17	14	29	10	107	78
12	Torben Schmidt Grael (H); Marcelo Ferreira	Brazil	1	10	14	130; DSQ	22	32	209	79
13	Paul Sustronk (H); Dag Nyhof	Canada	23	4	20	6	41	30	124	83
14	Silvio Santoni (H); Giuseppe Devoti	Italy	13	24	49	44	6	3	139	90
15	John A. MacCausland (H); George Iverson	United States	40	7	23	2	19	44	135	91
16	Benny Andersen (H); Mogens Just	Denmark	32	47	8	10	2	40	139	92
17	Peter Bromby (H); Lee White	Bermuda	37	2	24	30	18	23	134	97
18	Colin Beashel (H); David Giles	Australia	130; DSQ	46	29	4	14	13	236	106
19	Riccardo Simoneschi (H); Marco Marenco	Italy	44	29	19	7	7	130; DNF	236	106
20	Hubert Raudaschl (H); Christian Nehammer	Austria	2	58	22	5	32	46	165	107
21	Roberto Benamati (H); Luca Maffezzoli	Italy	130; DSQ	23	10	41	15	20	239	109
22	Frank Butzmann (H); Jens Peters	Germany	20	30	31	38	23	7	149	111
23	Larry Whipple (H); Barry van Leeuwen	United States	48	36	12	20	8	35	159	111
24	Marc A. Pickel (H); Thomas Auracher	Germany	42	42	18	9	47	5	163	116
25	Roberto Ferrarese (H); Stefano Pisciottu	Italy	30	31	15	23.25; RDG	38	17	154.25	116.25
26	Reinhard Schmidt (H); Jochen Wolfram	Germany	45	43	35	22	20	8	173	128
27	Werner Fritz (H); Ulrich Seeberger	Germany	50	37	34	12	26	22	181	131
28	Mitja Kosmina (H); Evgenij Komianec	Slovenia	62	21	6	37	130; DSQ	9	265	135
29	Stuart Hudson (H); Chris Gowers	Great Britain	130; DSQ	18	27	27	17	49	268	138
30	Daniel Stegmeier (H); Beat Stegmeier	Switzerland	11	13	36	57	50	31	198	141
31	Luis F.L. Simao (H); Andre Lekszycki	Brazil	29	33	30	18	42	54	206	152
32	Mark Mansfield (H); David O'Brien	Ireland	25	34	41	31	24	130; DNF	285	155
33	Roeland Wentholt (H); Joost Houweling	Netherlands	35	14	76	39	55	21	240	164
34	Mark Neeleman (H); Jos Schrier	Netherlands	130; DSQ	130; DNF	1	13	5	18	297	167
35	Jimmy Lowe (H); Andrew Higgs	Bahamas	130; DSQ	59	40	16	16	41	302	172
36	Paolo Semeraro (H); Paolo Fulvio	Italy	34	20	45	130; DSQ	37	38	304	174
37	Rob Douze (H); Vincent Geysen	Netherlands	6	63	57	46	40	29	241	178
38	Per Baagøe (H); Claus Olesen	Denmark	47	49	26	42	75	15	254	179
39	Thomas Jungblut (H); Gerrit Bartel	Germany	24	69	50	28	34	50	255	186
40	Marco Minghetti (H); Giancario Del Col	Italy	61	27	80	35	28	36	267	187
41	John King (H); Wellington de Barros	Brazil	39	12	25	130; DSQ	39	78	323	193
42	Andreas Dellwig (H); Hans-Martin Botz	Germany	9	41	32	55	60	130; DNF	327	197
43	Marin Lovrovic Jr. (H); Marin Lovrovic Sr.	Croatia	54	45	64	130; DNF	11	25	329	199
44	Giampiero Poggi (H); Manuele La Porta	Italy	31	22	56	34	58	59	260	201
45	Olle Johansson (H); Lars Edwall	Sweden	46	25	130; RET	23	46	62	332	202
46	Luca Simeone (H); Leone Rocca	Italy	49	117	44	26	31	52	319	202
47	James A. Freeman (H); Chris Rogers	United States	27	64	60	25	27	64	267	203
48	John Finch (H); Ruari Duffield	Canada	7	35	130; DNF	56	45	61	334	204
49	Halvor Schøyen (H); Asmund Tharaldsen	Norway	43	48	38	45	36	45	255	207
50	Flavio Marazzi (H); Renato Marazzi	Switzerland	8	32	130; RET	130; DNC	21	24	345	215
51	Urs Hunkeler (H); Jurg Schneider	Switzerland	130; DSQ	38	46	51	66	14	345	215
52	Terry Nielson (H); Doug Brophy	United States	130; DSQ	92	37	24	43	37	363	233
53	Federico Strocchi (H); Gianni Torboli	Italy	14	130; OCS	55	72	73	33	377	247
54	Mike Ilgenstein (H); Lutz Boguhn	Germany	130; DSQ	40	63	49	53	43	378	248
55	Guus Bierman (H); Robert Staartjes	Netherlands	12	87	68	77	48	48	340	253
56	Brad Anderson (H); Ryan Smith	Canada	130; DSQ	53	33	65	52	55	388	258
57	Tom Londrigan Jr. (H); Pat Brewer	United States	52	130; DNF	58	53	63	34	390	260
58	Vince Locatelli (H); Giuseppe Oggioni	Italy	68	44	43	36	97	69	357	260
59	Hubt Merkelbach (H); Oliver Vitzthun	Germany	65	51	65	52	30	103	366	263
60	Mike Hollerweger (H); Adi Luzibauer	Austria	130; DNF	84	51	21	56	53	395	265
61	Jurg Ryffel (H); Cyrille Fullemann	Switzerland	53	57	52	33	72	70	337	265
62	Peter van Veen (H); Paul Goelst	Netherlands	72	50	16	70	76	66	350	274
63	Volker Bernicken (H); Sebastian Dentler	Germany	81	82	28	66	62	39	358	276
64	Carlo Loos (H); Thomas Chromecek	Germany	130; DNF	52	71	71	44	42	410	280
65	Viktor Soloviev (H); Anatoli Michailin	Russia	130; DSQ	28	130; DSQ	62	51	28	429	299
66	Thomas Meseck (H); Dario Tizianel	Switzerland	33	121	47	86	69	68	424	303
67	Barton Beek (H); Chuck Beek	United States	80	39	53	130; DSQ	90	47	439	309
68	Ingvar Krook (H); Verus Thelander	Sweden	55	56	62	94	57	79	403	309
69	Klaus Meyer (H); Dirk Meissner	Germany	36	61	69	80	94	67	407	313
70	Jeannot Walder (H); Hans Korevaar	Switzerland	56	90	67	40	96	71	420	324
71	R. Klostermann (H); Felix Spiegel	Switzerland	18	105	48	91	82	93	437	332
72	Vince Graciotti (H); Igor Kaptourovitch	Italy	73	118	54	32	64	111	452	334
73	Josef Pieper (H); Sored Dretzko	Germany	57	93	96	54	61	75	436	340
74	Christoph Gautschi (H); Kurt Freuis	Switzerland	63	83	61	60	74	88	429	341
75	Marko Dahlberg (H); Ville Kurki	Finland	130; DSQ	68	42	130; DNF	49	56	475	345
76	Armand Battaglia (H); Alberto Bergamo	Italy	38	115	69.75; RDG	50	106	85	463.75	348.75
77	Eizens Cepurnieks (H); Alexander Muzicenko	Latvia	58	60	89	63	81	105	456	351
78	Marco Testa (H); Chad Thomas	Italy	130; DSQ	76	70	61	70	81	488	358
79	Josef Urban (H); Niki Schreiber	Austria	85	70	59	130; DSQ	54	98	496	366
80	Regi Schlubach (H); John Schlubach	Germany	86	103	82	58	83	57	469	366
81	Nicolas Loday (H); Alain Pilorge	France	130; DSQ	54	130; DSQ	43	59	82	498	368
82	C. Cristaldini (H); Alessandro Benetti	Italy	71	66	100	64	85	94	480	380
83	Jochen Schwarz (H); Jean Fr. Fino	Monaco	67	80	78	75	89	130; DNF	519	389
84	Dietmar Gfreiner (H); Mattias Poell	Austria	82	79	86	97	93	51	488	391
85	Andrea Folli (H); Paolo Busolo	Italy	130; DSQ	65	130; DSQ	48	65	84	522	392
86	Luciano Fafangel (H); Ljubo Koler	Slovenia	66	130; OCS	77	74	111	65	523	393
87	Alessandro Pascolato (H); Ronald Seifert	Brazil	130; DSQ	75	130; DSQ	47	78.75; RDG	63	523.75	393.75
88	Alberto Scapolo (H); Tarcisio Busseni	Italy	76	94	66	82	91	80	489	395
89	Martin Ingold (H); Lukas Baer	Switzerland	130; DSQ	100	83	68	71	74	526	396
90	Jan-Hendrik Loens (H); Michael Hettinger	Switzerland	74	71	94	92	88	72	491	397
91	Philippe Battaglia (H); David Lajoux	Monaco	41	67	92	130; DSQ	105	97	532	402
92	Sergej Kramskoj (H); Konstantin Karpenok	Russia	130; DSQ	88	79	69	107	60	533	403
93	Hans Hamel (H); Per Nilsson	Sweden	60	77	102	67	101	130; DNC	537	407
94	Alfred Weber (H); Harry Hoeferer	Austria	130; DSQ	74	83.75; RDG	79	109	73	548.75	418.75
95	Uwe Hannemann (H); Jochen Borbet	Germany	83	102	90	83	78	87	523	421
96	Brend Stoll (H); Christian Conrads	Germany	51	81	72	89	130; DNC	130; DNC	553	423
97	Heinz Maurer (H); Hans-Jürg Saner	Switzerland	59	123	84	85	95	100	546	423
98	Alberto Ariatta (H); Fabio Poles	Italy	70	101	93	84	100	76	524	423
99	Ben Staartjes (H); Ko van den Berg	Netherlands	69	86	91	130; DSQ	92	86	554	424
100	Marco Savelli (H); Enrico Vitiello	Italy	28	72	130; RET	130; DSQ	68	130; DNC	558	428
101	Donald McLean (H); John Gleed	Cayman Islands	130; DSQ	106	73	81	77	108	575	445
102	Andrea Serpieri (H); Ivano Petoletti	Italy	79	104	130; DSQ	87	84	91	575	445
103	Carlo Falcone (H); Shannon Falcone	Netherlands Antilles	130; DNF	73	101	78	98	96	576	446
104	Dierk Thomsen (H); Markus Mehlen	Germany	64	107	130; RET	99	80	104	584	454
105	Renato Irrera (H); Alessandro Caldarella	Italy	130; DSQ	110	75	59	103	110	587	457
106	Kim Fletcher (H); Scott Zimmer	United States	84	122	88	130; DSQ	79	89	592	462
107	Peter Vessella (H); Mike Dorgan	United States	19	55	130; DNC	130; DNC	130; DNC	130; DNC	594	464
108	Antonio Tamburini (H); Renzo Ricci	Italy	130; DSQ	111	130; DNF	98	67	58	594	464
109	Roland Amiel (H); François Giraud	France	90	109	74	95	112	99	579	467
110	Stefan Vogt (H); Marcus Adae	Germany	130; DSQ	85	99	76	86	130; DNC	606	476
111	Florian von Linde (H); Machael Ziller	Germany	87	98	97	96	104	102	584	480
112	Francis Mercier (H); Michel Dreyfus	France	89	124	103	93	87	112	608	484
113	Gian Lucca Dati (H); Gian Luca Poli	Italy	77	114	95	130; DSQ	110	92	618	488
114	Mario Caprile (H); Alfredo Buqeras Sanchez	Spain	91	96	106	88	113	107	601	488
115	Stefano Fusco (H); Livio Giacummo	Italy	88	62	105	130; DSQ	130; DNF	106	621	491
116	Tom Londrigan (H); Eric Beckwith	United States	130; DSQ	120	81	73	116	101	621	491
117	Peter Burkhardt (H); Karl Johann Schmid	Switzerland	75	112	110	100	114	130; DNC	641	511
118	Claude Bonanni (H); Arthur Anosov	United States	130; DSQ	113	87	90	118	113	651	521
119	Christian Scheinecker (H); Gerd Habermueller	Austria	130; DNF	9	130; DSQ	130; DNF	130; DNC	130; DNC	659	529
120	Harry W. Walker (H); Massimo Canali	United States	78	116	108	130; DSQ	119	109	660	530
121	Hubert Rausch (H); Michael Franke	Germany	130; DNF	89	130; DNC	130; DSQ	108	77	664	534
122	Klaus Kappes (H); Horst Seitz	Germany	92	130; DNS	85	130; DSQ	102	130; DNF	669	539
123	Bjørn Birger Vang Mathisen (H); Yann Maillet	Switzerland	130; DNF	108	107	130; DNF	99	95	669	539
124	Rob Niemczewski (H); Michael Umlauft	Germany	130; DSQ	97	104	130; DSQ	130; DNF	90	681	551
125	Franco Dazzi (H); Muzio Scacciati	Italy	130; DSQ	95	130; RET	130; DSQ	117	83	685	555
126	Guido Sodano (H); Mauro Portoni	Italy	130; DSQ	78	98	130; DSQ	120	130; DNC	686	556
127	Aurelio Quarto (H); Alberto Dalvit	Italy	130; DSQ	99	109	130; DND	115	114	697	567
128	Thomas Hopf (H); Florian Wahl	Germany	130; DSQ	91	130; DSQ	130; DNC	130; DNC	130; DNC	741	611
129	Thomas Kroth (H); Puck Dagmar	Germany	130; DSQ	119	130; DNC	130; DNC	130; DNC	130; DNF	769	639

Legend: DNC – Did not come to the starting area; DNF – Did not finish; DSQ – Disqualified; OCS – On the course side of the starting line; RDG – Redress given; RET – Retired;
