= Tommaso Chieffi =

Italian professional sailor

Tommaso Chieffi (born 20 December 1961) is an Italian professional sailor. He competed in the 1984 Summer Olympics.

He sailed on Italia II during the 1987 Louis Vuitton Cup and was the navigator on Il Moro Challenge at the 1992 Louis Vuitton Cup. Twenty years later, Chieffi sailed with Team Shosholoza at the 2007 Louis Vuitton Cup.

== World Championship Titles ==
Pos.	Role	Boat	Boat Name	Title	Location	Ref
1st		470	""	1985 470 Open World Championship	Marina di Carrara, ITA	
1st		IMS	""	1999 Rolex - IMS Offshore World Championship - Class B	Porto Cervo, ITA	
1st		Farr 30	""	Moby - 2007 M30 World Championship	Porto Cervo, ITA	
1st		X-35	""	2014 X-35 World Championship	Sanremo, ITA	
1st		Swan 60	"Bronenosec"	2013 Swan 60 World Championship		
1st		Swan 60	"Bronenosec"	2014 Swan 60 World Championship		
1st		Swan 60	"Bronenosec"	2015 Swan 60 World Championship		
