= CDV =

CDV may refer to:

- cdv Software Entertainment, a German video game publisher
- Canine distemper virus
- Carte de visite, a 19th-century photograph format
- CD Video, a video format
- CDV Records, Cosima De Vito's record label
- Merle K. (Mudhole) Smith Airport, Cordova, Alaska, US, IATA Code
- 405 in Roman numerals
- Compagnia della Vela, known as CDV
- Car-derived van
- Christian Democratic and Flemish, a Belgian political party

Criminal Domestic Violence
