= Pedro Campos Calvo-Sotelo =

Spanish sailor

Pedro Campos Calvo-Sotelo (born 6 March 1955) is a Spanish sailor who has competed in multiple America's Cup and Volvo Ocean Race campaigns.

Campos was Vaurien World Champion in 1976 and raced in different classes, including the Snipe, Dragon, Star, 470 and 420 classes. He won the Half Ton Cup in 1992.

Campos established a Spanish America's Cup campaign, Desafio España Copa América, for the 1992 Louis Vuitton Cup. The team, representing the Monte Real Club de Yates de Bayona finished fifth. They again competed in the 1995 Louis Vuitton Cup, finishing sixth. Desafio Español again competed in the 2000 Louis Vuitton Cup, finishing seventh.

He then turned his attention to the 2005–06 Volvo Ocean Race, organising the Spanish entry, movistar. For the 2008–09 Volvo Ocean Race, the team was sponsored by Telefonica and ran a two boat entry. Telefonica Blue finished third. Campos skippered Telefonica Black during the in-port races.

Telefonica again entered the 2011–12 Volvo Ocean Race, finishing fourth. The team became Mapfre for the 2014–15 Volvo Ocean Race, and again finished fourth. They will again compete in the 2017–18 Volvo Ocean Race.

He is the president of North Sails Spain and is a member of the Royal Order of Sports Merit.
