= Paul Cayard =

American sailor (born 1959)

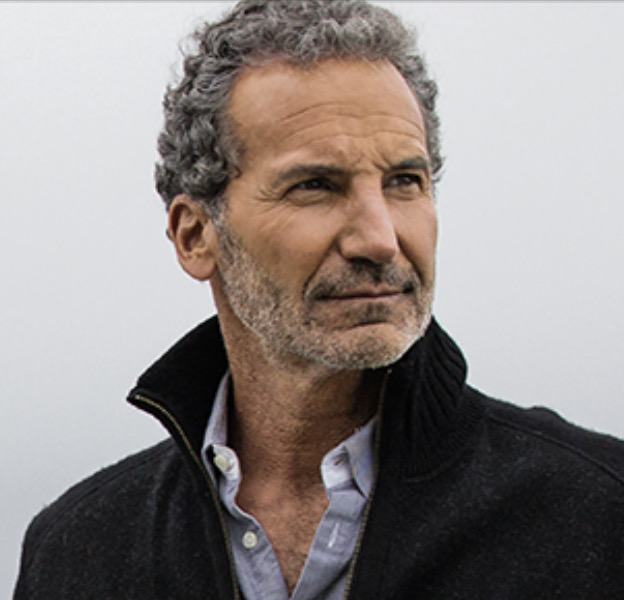

Personal information
- Full name: Paul Pierre Cayard
- Born: May 19, 1959 (age 67) San Francisco, California, U.S.

Sailing career
- Sport: Sailing
- Club: St. Francis Yacht Club
- Class: Star
Medal record
World Championships
| Bronze medal – third place | 1984 Vilamoura, Portugal | Star class |
| Bronze medal – third place | 1985 Nassau, Bahamas | Star class |
| Bronze medal – third place | 1987 Chicago, USA | Star class |
| Gold medal – first place | 1988 Buenos Aires, Argentina | Star class |
| Bronze medal – third place | 1992 San Francisco, USA | Star class |
| Bronze medal – third place | 2018 Oxford, Maryland, USA | Star class |
| Bronze medal – third place | 2022 Marblehead, USA | Star class |
| Gold medal – first place | 2025 Split, Croatia | Star class |
| Gold medal – first place | 2026 San Diego, USA | Etchells class |
Star Vintage Gold Cup
| Gold medal – first place | 2017 Richland, USA | Star class |
| Gold medal – first place | 2018 Richland, USA | Star class |
| Gold medal – first place | 2021 Richland, USA | Star class |
Bacardi Cup
| Gold medal – first place | 2026 Miami, USA | Star class |

Paul Pierre Cayard (born May 19, 1959) is an American yachtsman and professional sailor whose career spans Olympic sailing, the America's Cup, and offshore round-the-world racing. He is one of the most accomplished American sailors of his generation, with major victories across multiple disciplines of the sport.

Cayard competed in the Star class at the Olympic Games and was a long-time presence in the America's Cup, where he served as skipper, helmsman, and team leader for several prominent syndicates. He won the Whitbread Round the World Race in 1997–98 on EF Language, becoming the first American to win the event as skipper. In addition to offshore success, he has won sailing world championships in keelboat and one-design classes.

== Biography ==
Paul Cayard was born May 19, 1959, in San Francisco, California. His father, Pierre, was a carpenter for the San Francisco Opera. Cayard began sailing in 1967, at the age of eight. Cayard attended Crestmore High School. He graduated from San Francisco State University in 1981, with a degree in business management.

He started sailing at a young age and at the age of 14, Cayard became North American champion in the El Toro dinghy. He showed early promise as a sailor and, during his teenage years, competed successfully in high-performance dinghies such as the International 505 and the Laser (dinghy). As his skills developed, Cayard gained the attention of Tom Blackaller, who invited him to crew aboard his Star class yacht. Blackaller became an influential mentor, and the Star class would remain a central focus throughout Cayard's competitive career.

== Sailing career ==
=== Olympics ===
Cayard was selected as an alternate for the United States sailing team at the 1984 Summer Olympics. He later returned to Olympic competition in the Star class, winning a silver medal at the pre-Olympic regatta in 2003 and finishing fifth at the Sailing at the 2004 Summer Olympics – Star in Athens.

=== World Championships ===
As of September 27, 2015

| Year | Competition | Venue | Position | Event |
|---|---|---|---|---|
| 1978 | Star World Championships | San Francisco, United States | 4th | Star class |
| 1979 | Star World Championships | Marstrand, Sweden | 17th | Star class |
| 1984 | Star World Championships | Vilamoura, Portugal | 3rd | Star class |
| 1985 | Star World Championships | Nassau, Bahamas | 3rd | Star class |
| 1987 | Star World Championships | Chicago, United States | 3rd | Star class |
| 1988 | Star World Championships | Buenos Aires, Argentina | 1st | Star class |
| 1988 | Maxi class world championship | | 1st | Il Moro di Venezia III. |
| 1989 | One Ton class world championship | | 1st | |
| 1991 | IACC World Championship | San Diego, United States | 1st | America's Cup |
| 1991 | IOR 50 World Championship | Miura, Japan | 1st | Intl. 50' Class; Abracadabra. |
| 1992 | IYRU Match Racing World Championships | Long Beach, United States | 5th | Match racing |
| 1992 | Star World Championship | San Francisco, United States | 3rd | Star class |
| 1996 | Star World Championships | Rio de Janeiro, Brazil | 4th | Star class |
| 2002 | Star World Championship | Marina del Rey, United States | 4th | Star class |
| 2002 | Farr 40 World Championship | Paradise Island, Bahamas | 6th | Farr 40 class |
| 2002 | IMS World Championships | | 1st | IMS |
| 2003 | ISAF Sailing World Championships | Cádiz, Spain | 8th | Star class |
| 2004 | Star World Championship | Gaeta, Italy | 5th | Star class |
| 2009 | 505 World Championship | San Francisco, United States | 6th | 505 class |
| 2009 | TP52 World Championship | Palma de Mallorca, Spain | 3rd | TP52 class |
| 2010 | RC44 World Championship | Yaiza, Spain | 4th | RC44 class |
| 2010 | TP52 World Championship | Valencia, Spain | 4th | TP52 class |
| 2018 | Star World Championship | Oxford, United States | 3rd | Star class |
| 2022 | Star World Championship | Marblehead, United States | 3rd | Star class |
| 2024 | Star World Championship | San Diego, United States | 4th | Star class |
| 2025 | Star World Championships | Split, Crotia | 1st | Star class |
| 2026 | Etchells World Championship | San Diego, United States | 1st | Etchells class |

=== America's Cup ===
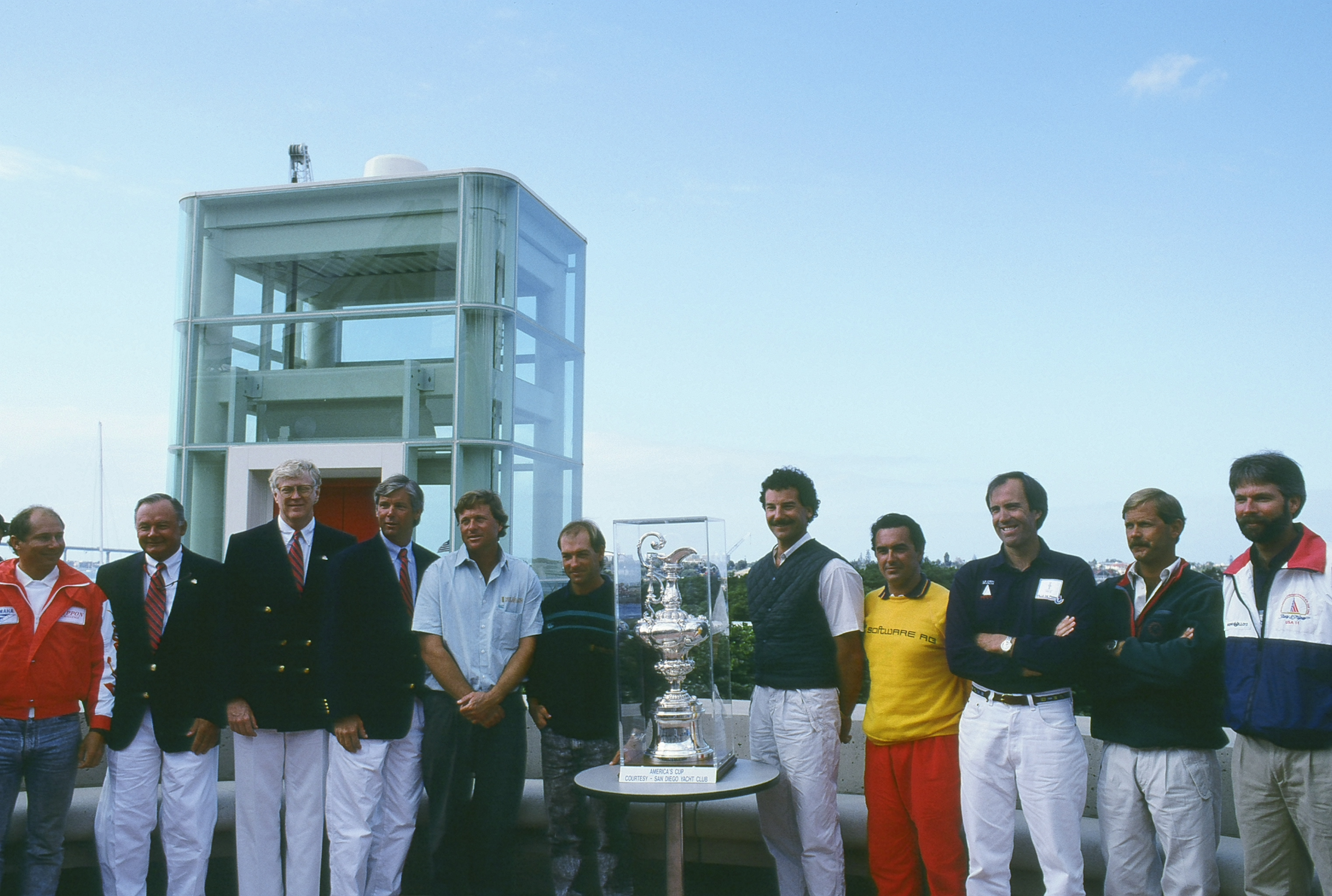
Teams meeting the press before the 1992 America's Cup

- Challenger Series for the 1983 America's Cup Blackallers Defender

Cayard first competed in the America's Cup in 1983 aboard Tom Blackaller's Defender as a jib trimmer, with the yacht finishing third in the defender selection series.

- Challenger Series for the 1987 America's Cup Blackallers USA

For the 1987 America's Cup, he advanced to the role of tactician and alternate helmsman aboard Blackaller's USA, which was eliminated by Dennis Conner's Stars & Stripes in the challenger selection process.

- Challenger Series for the 1992 America's Cup,

Cayard served as manager and skipper of the Italian syndicate Il Moro di Venezia, backed by Raul Gardini. In 1991, he won the inaugural International America's Cup Class world championship. During the challenger selection series, Il Moro di Venezia defeated seven teams from six countries to win the 1992 Louis Vuitton Cup, earning the right to challenge for the America's Cup. The campaign included a successful protest initiated by Cayard regarding the use of a bowsprit by the New Zealand challenge.

In the America's Cup match races, Il Moro di Venezia faced the faster America³. Despite being outmatched overall, Cayard's team secured a notable victory in the second race of the series, winning by three seconds after leading from the start, which at the time represented the narrowest margin of victory in America's Cup history. Il Moro di Venezia ultimately lost the series 4–1.

- Challenger Series for the 1995 America's Cup

In 1995, Cayard joined Team Dennis Conner's Stars & Stripes as primary helmsman. Although the yacht was slower than several competitors during the defender series, the team won the 1995 Citizen Cup, securing the right to defend the America's Cup. The syndicate subsequently elected to defend the Cup using Young America, resulting in a 5–0 loss to Team New Zealand, winner of the 1995 Louis Vuitton Cup.

- 30th 2000 America's Cup

For the 2000 America's Cup, Cayard formed and led the AmericaOne syndicate, representing the St. Francis Yacht Club. The team advanced to the finals of the 2000 Louis Vuitton Cup against Prada, narrowly losing the best-of-nine series 5–4 after equipment failures proved decisive. Prada later lost the America's Cup to the defending Team New Zealand.

- 2003 America's Cup

Following the 2000 campaign, Cayard advised the AmericaOne board not to pursue the 2003 America's Cup due to financial and recruitment challenges. The syndicate's assets were later sold to Larry Ellison, forming the basis of what became Oracle BMW Racing. Cayard served as skipper during the early stages of the program before transitioning into an administrative role and subsequently departing the team.

- Challenger of Record for the 34th America's Cup

In 2010, Artemis Racing became with Cayard appointed as chief executive officer.

=== Round the World Races ===
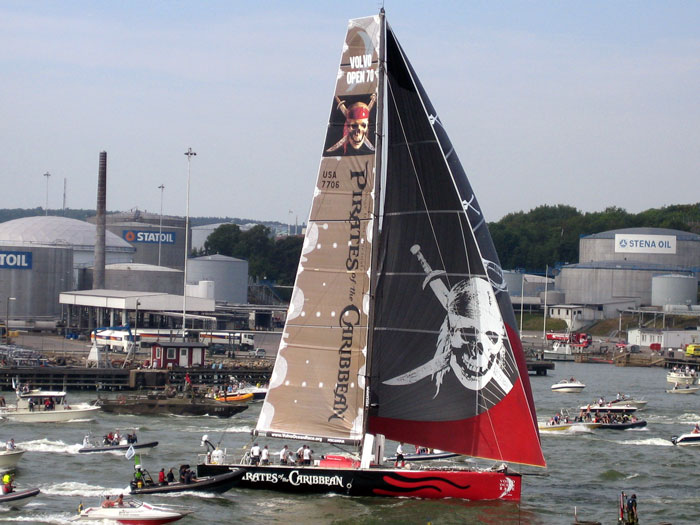
Pirates of the Caribbean winning the final leg of the 2005–06 Volvo Ocean Race

Cayard's most significant offshore achievement came in the 1997–98 Whitbread Round the World Race, where he served as skipper of Volvo 60 EF Language. Over a course of approximately 32,000 miles (51,000 km), the team won the event, making Cayard the first American to win the Whitbread Round the World Race as skipper.

In the 2005–06 Volvo Ocean Race, Cayard returned to round-the-world competition as skipper of Volvo 70 Pirates of the Caribbean, a syndicate sponsored by The Walt Disney Company. Managed by Cayard Sailing Inc., the team won the final leg into Gothenburg and finished second overall in the race standings.

=== Other sailing Title ===
- Winner of the Kenwood Cup (1994)
- Winner of the Sardinia Cup (1994, 1996)
- Winner of the RORC Admiral's Cup (1995).
- Star Class Events
  - Winner of the 99th Bacardi Cup in 2026.
  - Winner of the Star Vintage Gold Cup (2017, 2018, 2021)
  - Winner of the Star Western Hemisphere Championships (2005)

=== Other sailing roles ===
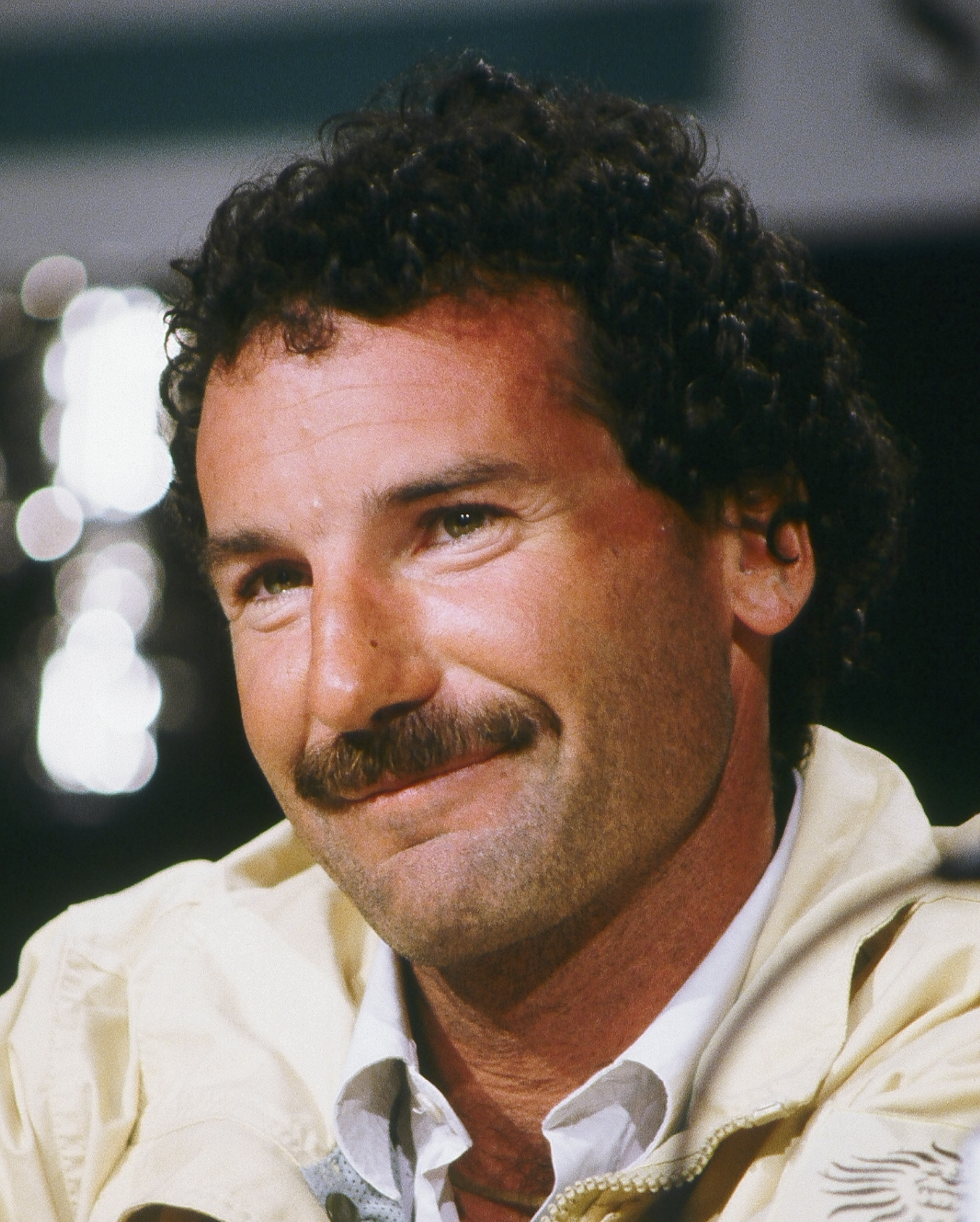
Cayard in 2011

Following his active racing career, Cayard remained closely involved in professional sailing through advisory, leadership, and governance roles. In 2007, he participated in the 2007 America's Cup as a technical advisor to Desafío Español 2007 and also provided television commentary for the 2007 Louis Vuitton Cup and the 2007 America's Cup for La7, the Italian broadcast rights holder. Later that year, he was appointed sports director for Desafío Español for the 33rd America's Cup.

In the same period, Cayard and Russell Coutts announced the creation of the World Sailing League (WSL) in partnership with Portuguese sports promoter João Lagos. Although the series was ultimately not held, the initiative reflected broader efforts to expand professional sailing into a global, commercially focused format. During the 33rd America's Cup, Cayard also served as a commentator for Eurosport.

In 2009, Cayard joined Artemis Racing, owned by Torbjörn Törnqvist, where he served as skipper of the Louis Vuitton Trophy team and as tactician aboard the TP52 Artemis.

He also helmed the RC44 Katusha on the RC44 Championship Tour from 2010 to 2012.

From 2019 to 2020, Cayard served as chairman of the board of the St. Francis Yacht Club. He is an ambassador for Rolex and the One Ocean Foundation.

Cayard was appointed vice president of the International Star Class Yacht Racing Association (ISCYRA) in 2020. His tenure as executive director of the U.S. sailing team concluded in February 2023. In 2023, he was elected president of ISCYRA, succeeding Tom Londrigan. Of his sailing achievements, Cayard has identified his victory at the 1988 Star World Championship as his most personally significant.

== Awards ==
- Inducted into the National Sailing Hall of Fame in 2011.
- Inducted into the Bay Area Sports Hall of Fame in 2020
- Inducted into the America's Cup Hall of Fame in 2025.
- Named 1991 Yachting Magazine Yachtsman of the Year
- Named 1992 Rothmans Yachtsman of the Year
- Named 1998 US Sailing Rolex Yachtsman of the Year
- Named 2025 US Sailing Rolex Yachtsman of the Year

== Personal life ==
Cayard married Icka Petterson, daughter of Swedish sailor Pelle Petterson, in 1985, and the couple had two children together. They divorced in 2010.

Cayard is a member of several international yacht clubs, including the St. Francis Yacht Club, the San Francisco Yacht Club, Yacht Club Costa Smeralda, and Yacht Club de Monaco.

He speaks English, French, and Italian. He also holds a pilot certification with an instrument rating for both single- and multi-engine aircraft.

== See also ==
- Italy at the America's Cup
