= 1992 America's Cup =

Coordinates: 32°47′N 114°09′W

28th America's Cup
Defender United States
- Defender club: San Diego Yacht Club
- Yacht: America^{3}

Challenger Italy
- Challenger club: Compagnia della Vela di Venezia
- Yacht: Il Moro di Venezia V (ITA-25)

Competition
- Location: San Diego, United States
- Dates: 9–16 May 1992
- Rule: International America's Cup Class
- Winner: San Diego Yacht Club
- Score: 4–1

The 28th America's Cup was contested between the winner of the 1992 Citizen Cup defender selection series, America³, and the winner of the 1992 Louis Vuitton Cup challenger selection series, Il Moro di Venezia. It was the first edition of the America's Cup that was sailed on International America's Cup Class yachts.

This was last Cup of the best-of-seven format held since 1930; the best-of-nine would begin in 1995, continuing through 2007.

== Races ==
| Date | Winner | Yacht | Loser | Yacht | Score | Delta |
|---|---|---|---|---|---|---|
| 9 May 1992 | America³ | USA 23 | Il Moro di Venezia | ITA 25 | 1-0 | 0:30 |
| 10 May 1992 | Il Moro di Venezia | ITA 25 | America³ | USA 23 | 1-1 | 0:03 |
| 12 May 1992 | America³ | USA 23 | Il Moro di Venezia | ITA 25 | 2-1 | 1:58 |
| 14 May 1992 | America³ | USA 23 | Il Moro di Venezia | ITA 25 | 3-1 | 1:04 |
| 16 May 1992 | America³ | USA 23 | Il Moro di Venezia | ITA 25 | 4-1 | 0:44 |

== Crew ==
=== America³ ===
| Role | Name |
|---|---|
| Skipper | Bill Koch (USA) |
| Helmsman | Buddy Melges (USA) |

Other crew included Andreas Josenhans and Josh Belsky, Lou Varney and James (Beau) LeBlanc.

=== Il Moro di Venezia ===
| Role | Name |
|---|---|
| Skipper / Helmsman | Paul Cayard (USA) |
