= Royal Prince Alfred Yacht Club =

Yacht club in Newport, Australia

Coordinates: 33°39′23″S 151°18′20″E

- Burgee
- Short name: RPAYC
- Founded: 1867
- Location: Newport, New South Wales, Australia
- Commodore: Robert McClelland
- Website: rpayc.com.au

Royal Prince Alfred Yacht Club (RPAYC) is one of Australia's leading yacht clubs with a strong elite sailing focus located in Pittwater Newport, New South Wales.

The club was formerly located at Kirribilli before relocating to its present location on Green Point, towards the southern end of Pittwater. The club is situated to the north of Crystal Bay and across from The Newport. The club maintains an adjacent slipway, hardstand and other maintenance facilities on the northern shore of Crystal Bay.

== History ==
RPAYC was formed at a public meeting of boatowners in Sydney on 15 October 1867. The name Prince Alfred Yacht Club was chosen in view of the intended visit of Prince Alfred of the United Kingdom, in command of HMS Galatea, which took place in 1868. Premises were built in Moore Street, now known as Martin Place.

The prefix Royal was granted by George V in 1911.

Pittwater Division was formed as a result of a decision in 1919 to investigate alternatives to racing on the increasingly congested Sydney Harbour. The original Green Point clubhouse, on the present site, was opened in 1938. In 1956, the city clubhouse was replaced by new premises in Rowe Street.

In 1969, the Rowe Street clubhouse was sold to finance development of the Pittwater premises. While arrangements continued for some years for members to use the facilities of the Sydney Club in Rowe Street adjacent to the former city clubhouse, all remaining yachting activities were transferred to Pittwater.

== Notable members ==
=== America's Cup sailors ===
- James Spithill (Skipper)

=== World records ===
- Kay Cottee

=== Olympians ===
- Bill Northam, International 5.5 Metre Class Gold Medal 1964
- Peter O'Donnell, International 5.5 Metre Class Gold Medal 1964
- Martin Visser, International Star Class 1964
- Ian Winter, Flying Dutchman Class 1964
- Bill Solomons, International 5.5 Metre Class 1968
- John Anderson, International Star Class Gold Medal 1972
- David Forbes, International Star Class Gold Medal 1972
- Ken Berkeley, International Soling Class 1972
- Bob Miller, International Soling Class 1972
- Gordon Ingate, International Tempest Class 1972
- John Anderson, International Soling Class 1976
- David Forbes, International Soling Class 1976
- Richard Coxon, International Star Class 1984
- Colin Beashel, International Star Class 1988
- Glen Bourke, International Star Class 1988
- Mike Mottl, International Soling Class 1992
- Colin Beashel, International Star Class 1992
- Glen Bourke, Finn class 1992
- Colin Beashel, International Star Class Bronze Medal 1996
- Stephen McConaghy, International Soling Class 1996
- Colin Beashel, International Star Class, Flag Bearer for Opening Ceremony 2000
- Colin Beashel, International Star Class 2004
- Iain Murray, International Star Class 2008
- Andrew Palfrey, International Star Class 2008
- Angela Farrell, Yngling Class 2008
- Nina Curtis, Elliott 6m Women's Match Racing Silver Medal 2012
- Daniel Fitzgibbon and Liesl Tesch, Two-Person Keelboat (SKUD18) Gold Medal 2012
- Jason Waterhouse, mixed Nacra 17 Silver Medal 2016

== America's Cup winners ==
- James Spithill 2010, 2013
