= Compagnia della Vela =

- Burgee
- Short name: CDV
- Founded: May 5, 1911; 113 years ago
- Location: Venice, Italy
- Commodore: Pier Vettor Grimani
- Website: www.compagniadellavela.org

Compagnia della Vela is a yacht club in Venice, in northern Italy. The club was the "Challenger of Record" for the 1992 America's Cup, where they were represented by their team Il Moro di Venezia, and won the 1992 Louis Vuitton Cup.

== History ==
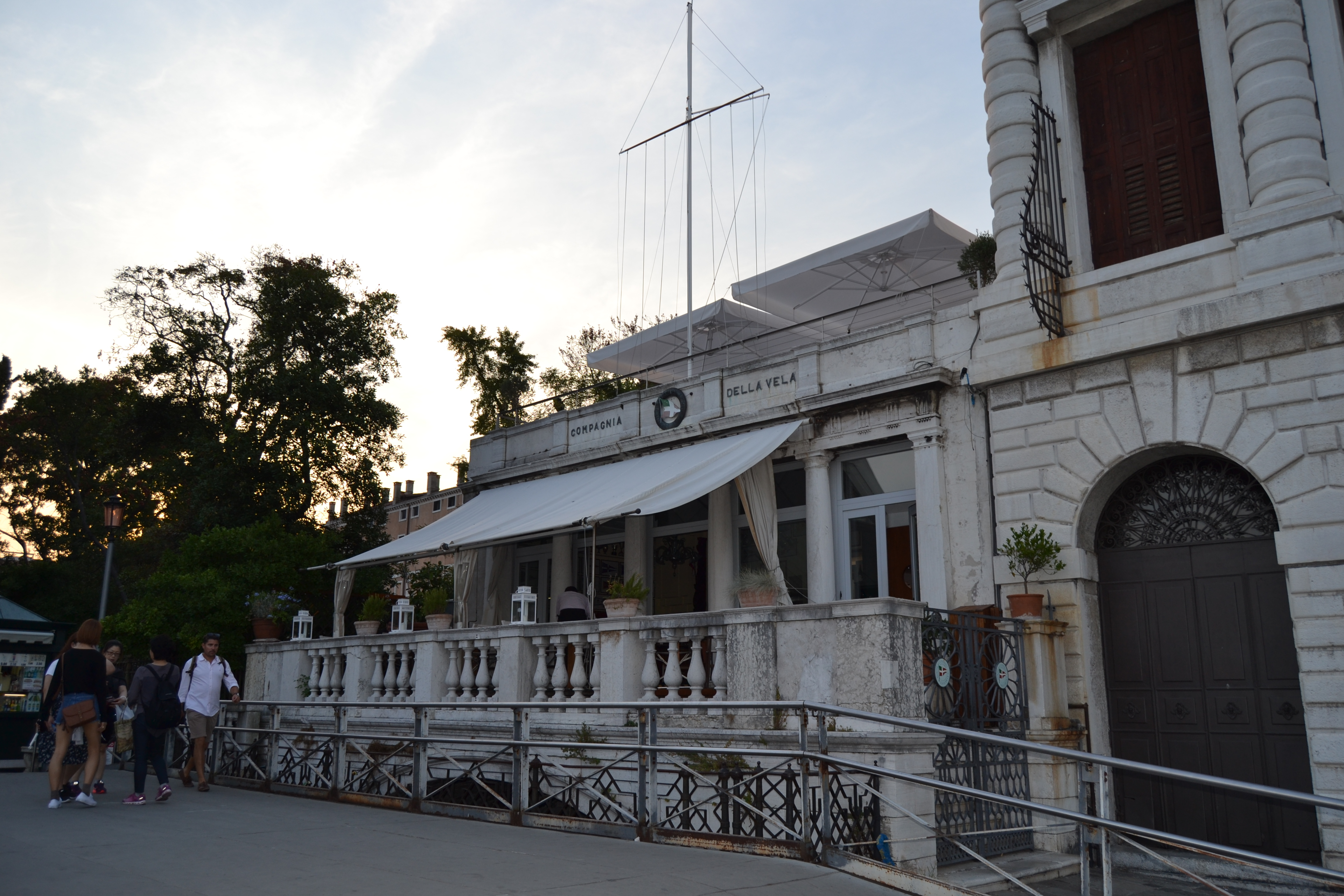
Corporate headquarters of the CDV in Venice.

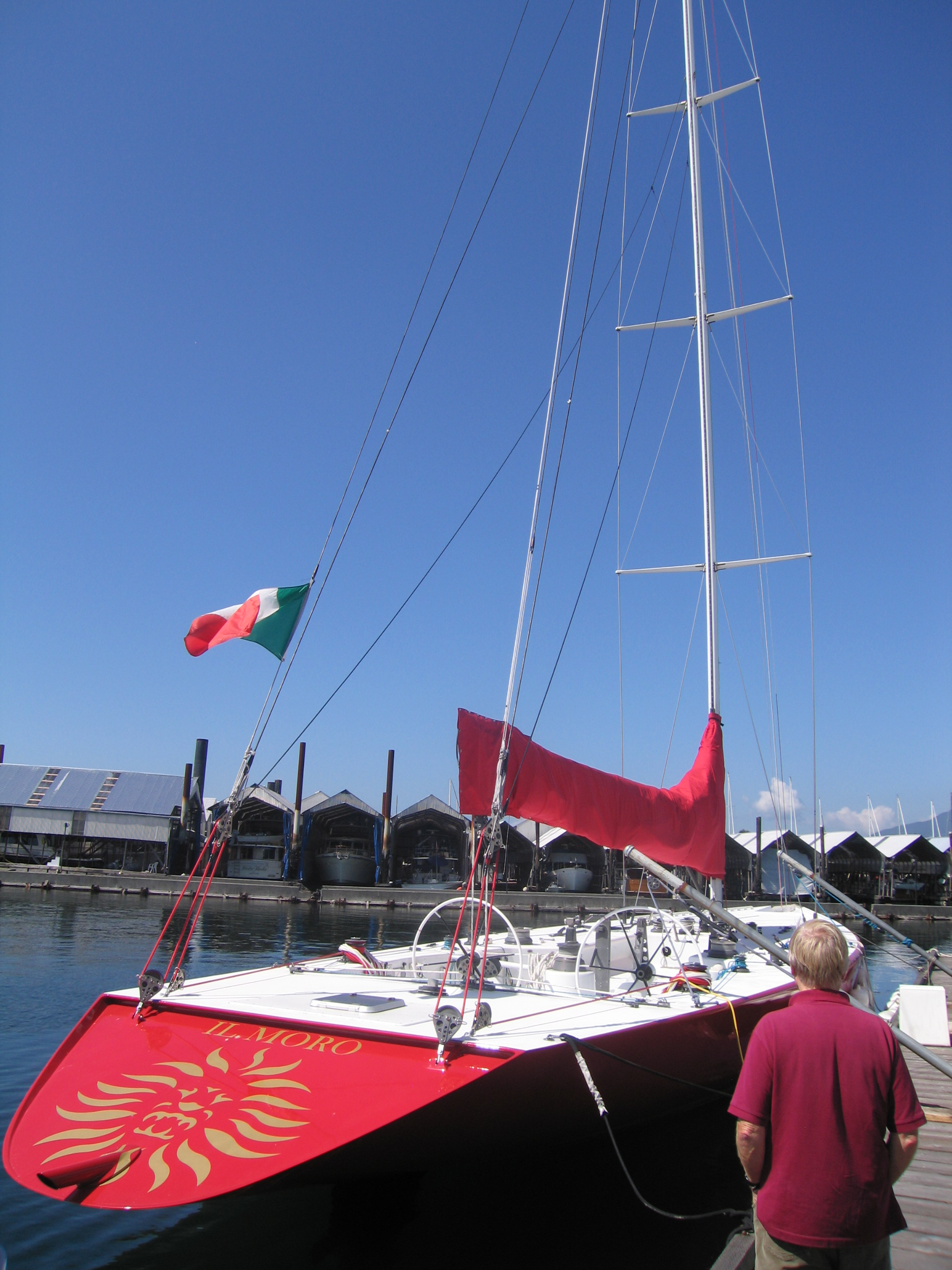
Il Moro di Venezia shot in 2013.

Founded on March 15, 1911, as a Yacht Club Veneziano (Venetian Yacht Club), among its members it included Gabriele d'Annunzio who, in a message dated 1919 (the original is kept in the company headquarters), inspired the new name Compagnia della Vela (Company of Sailing) and the Latin motto Custodi, Domine, vigilantes (Protect, oh Lord, the Watchful), after the club initials "CDV."

With the patent of December 1933, the King of Italy, Vittorio Emanuele III, granted the company the privilege to display the Stemma Reale (Royal Coat of Arms) on the guidone sociale (club burgee), in addition to the honor of bearing the National War Flag that had already been previously accorded to the Venetian Yacht Club and the club was accordingly renamed the Reale Compagnia della Vela (Royal Company of Sailing).

Returning to previous name of Compagnia della Vela at the advent of the Republic of Italy in 1948, to date the burgee consists of a white cross on a red field, with a green canton filling the upper quarter at the hoist.

In 1990 the Compagnia della Vela received from the Italian National Olympic Committee (CONI) the Silver Star for sporting merit. In 1995, the CONI awarded the Compagnia della Vela their Gold Star for sporting merit. In 2012 the Compagnia della Vela received the Golden Collar for sporting merit.

== Il Moro di Venezia ==
Il Moro di Venezia V won the 1992 Louis Vuitton Cup, the competition among all potential challengers—in 1992, eight competing teams from seven nations—to become the sole challenger for the America's Cup. However, despite being favourites, they were unable to win the 1992 America's Cup.

== Notable members ==
- Gabriele d'Annunzio
- Giuseppe Volpi
- Vittorio Marzotto
- Raul Gardini

== See also ==
- Italy at the America's Cup
- Il Moro di Venezia
- 1992 Louis Vuitton Cup
