= Swan 60 FD =

Sailboat class

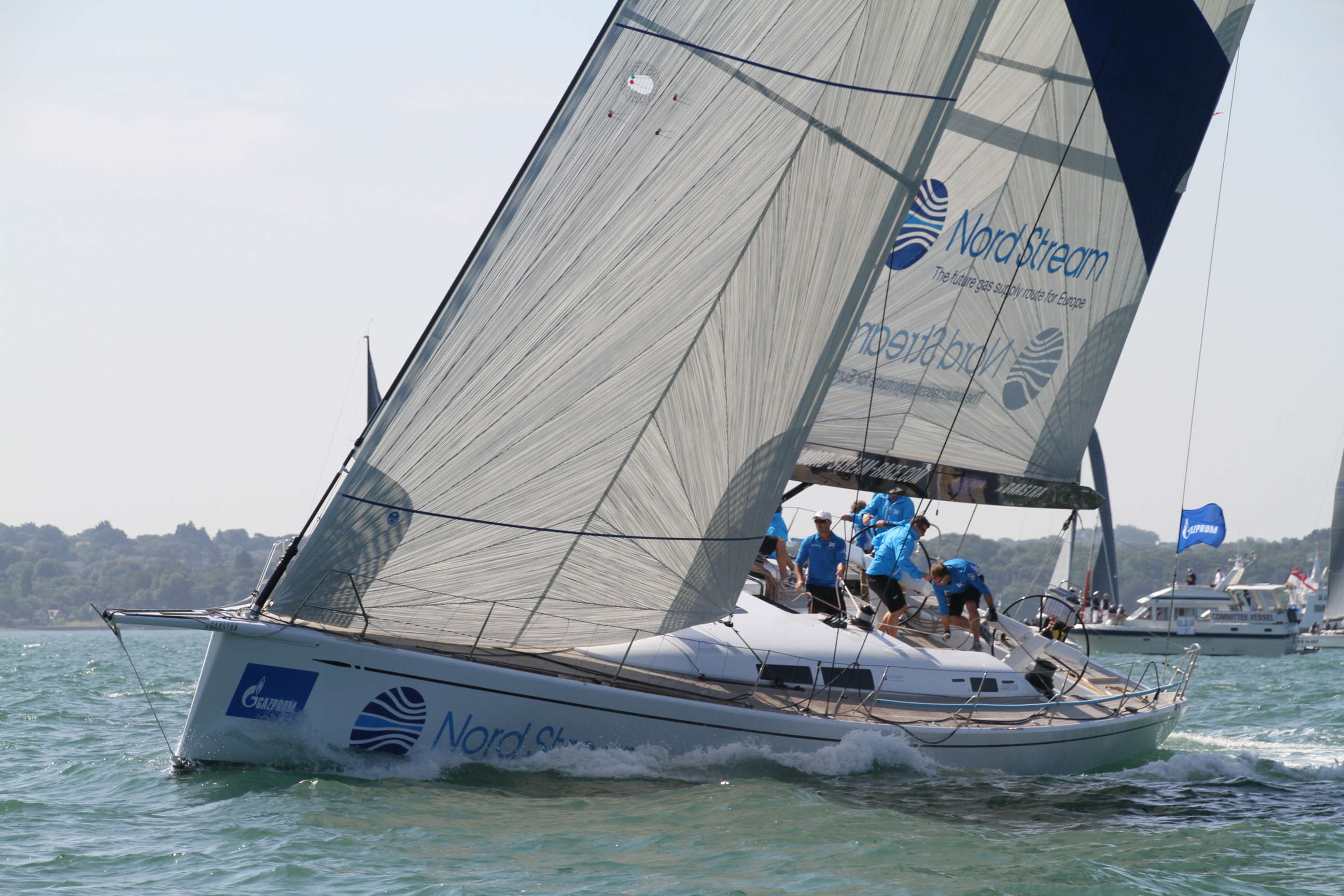

Development
- Designer: Germán Frers
- Location: Finland
- Year: 2009
- No. built: 10
- Builder: Oy Nautor AB
- Role: Racer-Cruiser
- Name: Swan 60 FD

Boat
- Displacement: 41,226 lb (18,700 kg)
- Draft: 11.81 ft (3.60 m)

Hull
- Type: monohull
- Construction: glassfibre
- LOA: 61.89 ft (18.86 m)
- LWL: 54.80 ft (16.70 m)
- Beam: 16.70 ft (5.09 m)
- Engine: Volvo or Yanmar 110 hp (82 kW) diesel engine

Hull appendages
- Keel: Fin keel with weighted bulb
- Ballast: 16,975 lb (7,700 kg)
- Rudder: Skeg-mounted/Spade-type/Transom-mounted rudder

Rig
- Rig type: Bermuda rig
- I foretriangle height: 83.53 ft (25.46 m)
- J foretriangle base: 23.19 ft (7.07 m)
- P mainsail luff: 79.79 ft (24.32 m)
- E mainsail foot: 27.88 ft (8.50 m)

Sails
- Sailplan: 19/20 Fractional rigged sloop
- Mainsail area: 1,355 sq ft (125.9 m^{2})
- Jib/genoa area: 1,023 sq ft (95.0 m^{2})
- Gennaker area: 3,444 sq ft (320.0 m^{2})
- Upwind sail area: 2,377 sq ft (220.8 m^{2})
- Downwind sail area: 4,799 sq ft (445.8 m^{2})

The Swan 60 FD (Flush Deck) and Swan 60 S (Salon) are a series of Finnish sailboats that were designed by Germán Frers as racer-cruisers.

The boats were collectively marketed by the manufacturer as the Swan 60, but are generally now referred to by their sub-model names to avoid confusion with the unrelated earlier 1994 Swan 60 design.

== Production ==
The series was built by Oy Nautor AB in Finland, from 2009 to 2017, but it is now out of production. Ten Swan 60 FD models were completed.

== Design ==
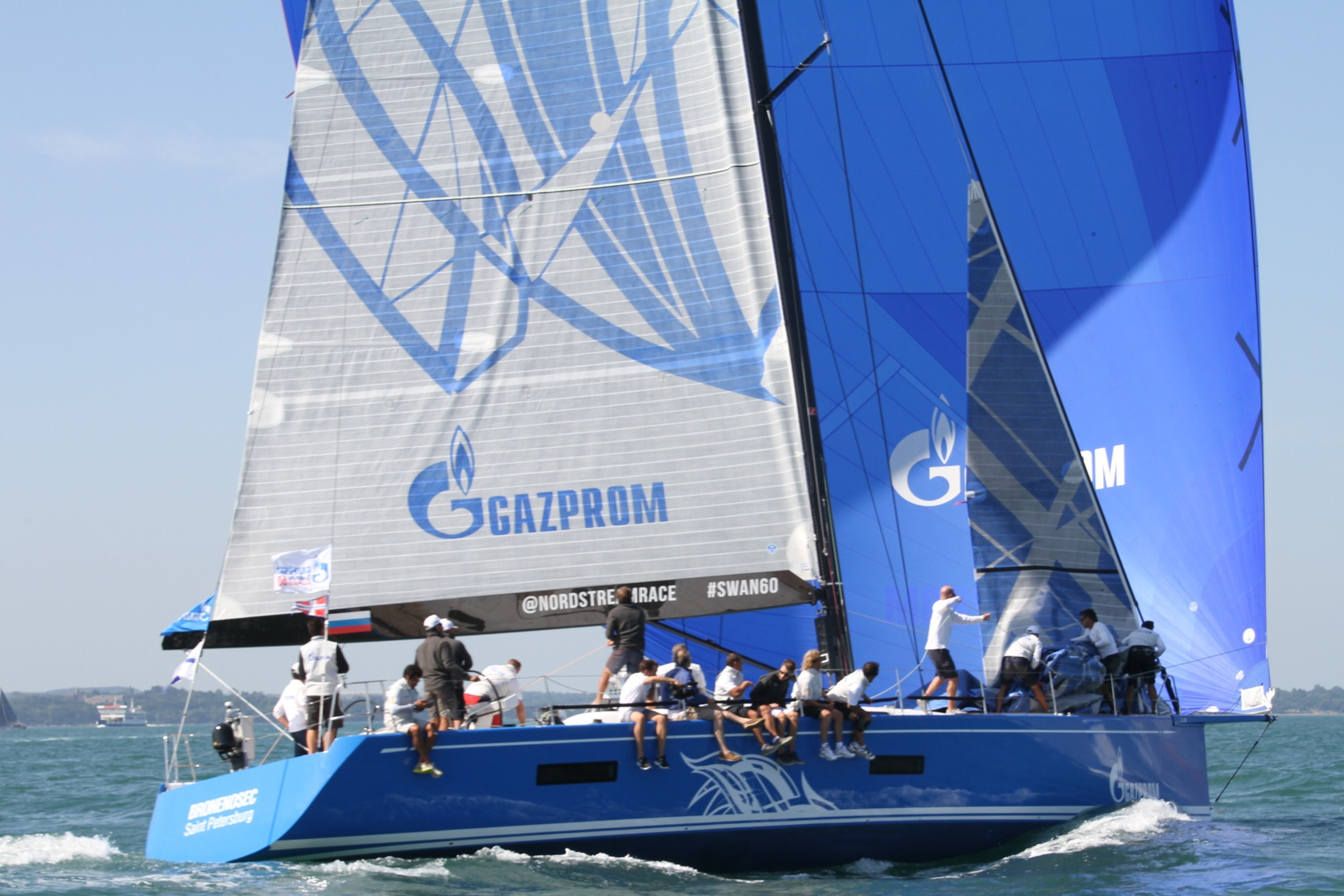
Swan 60 FD showing the tailgate reverse transom

The Swan 60 FD and S are racing keelboats, built predominantly of glassfibre, with wooden trim.

The Swan 60 FD model has a 19/20 fractional sloop rig with a bowsprit, with a keel-stepped mast, two sets of swept spreaders and carbon fibre spars with stainless steel rod rigging. The hull has a prepreg carbon fibre-reinforced skin with a Corecell core. The hull has a plumb stem, a reverse transom with a drop-down tailgate swimming platform or optional open transom, an internally mounted spade-type, carbon fibre rudder controlled by dual wheels and a fixed steel fin keel with a weighted bulb. A dinghy garage is fitted aft.

The design has sleeping accommodation for six people, with a double berth in the bow cabin with a straight settee, an L-shaped settee and a straight settee in the main cabin and two aft cabins, each with two single berths. The galley is located on the port side just forward of the companionway ladder. The galley is of straight configuration and is equipped with a four-burner stove. A navigation station is opposite the galley, on the starboard side. There are three heads, one just forward of the bow cabin in the forepeak and one in each aft cabin.

For sailing downwind the design may be equipped with a symmetrical gennaker of 3,444 sq ft (320.0 m^{2}).

== Variants ==
Swan 60 FD
This flush deck model was introduced in 2009 and produced until 2017 with ten boats completed. It has a length overall of 61.89 ft (18.9 m), a waterline length of 54.80 ft (16.7 m), displaces 41,226 lb (18,700 kg) and carries 16,975 lb (7,700 kg) of lead ballast. The boat has a draft of 11.81 ft (3.60 m) with the standard keel. The boat is fitted with a Japanese Yanmar or Swedish Volvo diesel engine of 110 hp (82 kW). The fuel tank holds 132 U.S. gallons (500 L; 110 imp gal) and the fresh water tank has a capacity of 105 U.S. gallons (400 L; 87 imp gal).The design has a hull speed of 9.92 kn (18.37 km/h).
Swan 60 S
This deck salon model of the FD model was built from 2009 to 2017. It has a length overall of 61.89 ft (18.9 m), a waterline length of 57.08 ft (17.4 m), displaces 52,250 lb (23,700 kg) and carries 18,078 lb (8,200 kg) of lead ballast. The boat has a draft of 9.83 ft (3.00 m) with the standard keel. The boat is fitted with a diesel engine of 110 hp (82 kW). The fuel tank holds 264 U.S. gallons (1,000 L; 220 imp gal) and the fresh water tank has a capacity of 132 U.S. gallons (500 L; 110 imp gal).

== Operational history ==
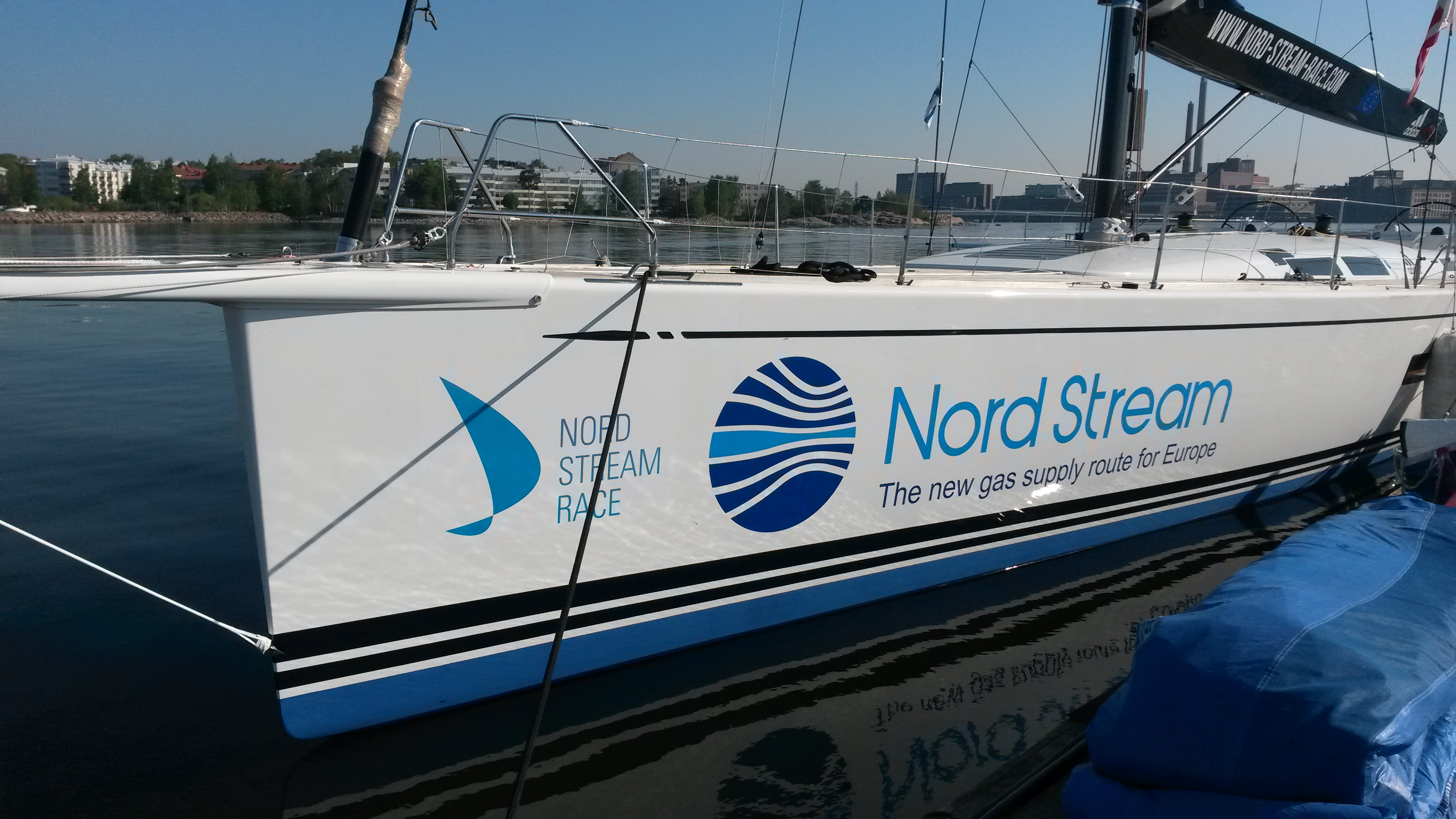
Swan 60 FD bow and bowsprit

A 2009 Sail Magazine review noted of the Swan 60 FD, "the yacht has a powerful rig and a long waterline, with a hull form capable of semi-planing speed. Together with powered winches, a cockpit layout that puts the helmsman within easy reach of the trimming gear allows the yacht to be sailed by just two people. The helmsman also has a clear view of all the sails and approaching waves. Several deck layouts include two transom options—a stylish open version, and a closed transom with a sunbathing area on deck and space for a dinghy garage below."

In a 2010 review, Louay Habib wrote about the Swan 60 FD for boats.com stating, "the latest version of the Swan 60 is turning heads, and rightly so. On paper, it has a better racing set up than the previous model of the same name, and at this year’s Swan Cup in Sardinia Johann Killinger’s new Emma took a credible second place to the much larger Swan 90, DSK Pioneer. In a fleet of 21 Swan Maxis, Emma was punching well above her weight."

== See also ==
- List of sailing boat types
