= Vaurien World Championship =

International sailing regatta

The Vaurien World Championship is an annual international sailing regatta for Vaurien two person dinghy, organized by the host club on behalf of the International Vaurien Class Association and recognized by World Sailing, the sports IOC recognized governing body.

== Events ==
Editions	Date		Host			Sailors			Boats					Ref.
Editions		Year	Host club	Location	Nat.	Tot	Nat	Con	Boat			M/F	F/M	Ref.
1	-	1962		Royan	France									
2	-	1963		Alkmaar	Netherlands									
3	-	1964		Palamós	Spain									
4	-	1965		Carnac	France									
5	-	1966		Orbetello	Italy									
6	-	1967		Radolfzell	Germany									
7	-	1968		Vilassar de Mar	Spain									
8	-	1969		Neuchâtel	Switzerland									
9	-	1970		Medemblik	Netherlands									
10	-	1971		Ostend	Belgium									
11	-	1972		Brest	France									
12	-	1973		Lourenco Marques	Portugal									
13	-	1974		Premiá de Mar	Spain									
14	-	1975		Livorno	Italy									
15	-	1976		Monaco	Monaco									
16	-	1977		Kiel	Germany									
17	-	1978		Casablanca	Morocco									
18	-	1979		San Sebastián	Spain									
19	Jun	1980		Póvoa de Varzim	Portugal									
20	25-31 Jul	1981		Medemblik	Netherlands									
21	24-31 Jul	1982		Capodimonte	Italy									
22	1-6 Aug	1983		Brest	France									
23	11-18 Aug	1984		L'Hospitalet de l'Infant	Spain									
24	20-27 Jul	1985		Vada	Italy									
25	2-8 Aug	1986		Vinelz	Switzerland									
26	25-31 Jul	1987		Medemblik	Netherlands									
27	21-29 Jul	1988		Viana	Portugal									
28	21-29 Jul	1989		Überlingen	Germany									
29	-	1990		Nettuno	Italy									
30	-	1991		Laredo	Spain									
31	8-15 Aug	1992		Piriac-sur-Mer	France									
32	10-16 Jul	1993		Gravedona	Italy	97	8	1	87					
33	23-30 Jul	1994		Lipno	Czech Republic									
34	30Jul -6Aug	1995		Setúbal	Portugal									
35	9-17 Aug	1996		Hoorn	Netherlands									
36	-	1997	Club Náutico Los Nietos	Los Nietos	Spain									
37	1-8 Aug	1998	Yacht-Club Radolfzell	Radolfzell	Germany	218	14	4	109					
38	-	1999	Clube Internacional da Marina de Vilamoura	Vilamoura	Portugal	88	5	2	44	33	8	3	0	
39	21-29 Jul	2000		Loctudy	France	62	9	1	31					
40	21-28 Jul	2001		Follonica	Italy	180	12	1	90					
41	28Jul -4Aug	2002	Clube Naval Povoense	Povoa do Varzim	Portugal	144	8	2	72					
42	-	2003		Stavoren	Netherlands									
43	3-11 Apr	2004	Yacht Club Punta del Este	Punta del Este	Uruguay	86	8	2	43					
44	16-25 Jul	2005	Real Club Náutico de Sangenjo	Sanxenxo	Spain	96	7	1	48					
45	29Jul -8Aug	2006	Circolo Velico Pietrabianca	Vada	Italy	152	7	2	76					
46	22-28 Jul	2007	Real Club Náutico de Laredo	Laredo	Spain	86	6	1	58					
47	2-9 Aug	2008	Clube Naval de Leça	Leça da Palmeira, Matosinhos	Portugal	96	5	2	49					
48	12-19 Jul	2009	Sport Nautique Bizertine	Bizerte	Tunisia	60	6	1	30					
49	19-25 Jul	2010	TJ Fatran and YC LIMAR	Liptovsky Mikulas	Slovakia	116	11	2	58					
50	30Jul -6Aug	2011	Segelclub Lembruch	Dümmer, Lembruch	Germany	132	9	1	66					
51	14-21 Jul	2012	Société des Régates de Douarnenez	Douarnenez, Brittany	France	138	11	3	69					
52	13-20 Jul	2013	Real Club Náutico de Sangenjo	Sanxenxo, Galicia	Spain	120	8	2	60					
53	26Jul -2Aug	2014	Compagnia della Vela Grosseto	Grosseto, Tuscany	Italy	158	10	2	79					
54	23-30 Jul	2015	Royal Yacht Club Sneek	Sneek	Netherlands	158	9	1	79					
55	23-30 Jul	2016	Clube de Vela de Viana do Castelo	Viana do Castelo	Portugal	174	10	3	87	59	12	14	2	
56	22-30 Jul	2017	Yacht Club Jermak	Gudowo	Poland	126	11	3	63					
57	20-29 Jul	2018	Travemünder Woche	Travemünde, Lübeck	Germany	124	8	2	62					
58	20-27 Jul	2019	GEAS NBC Vela Colico	Lago di Como, Colico	Italy	156	11	3	78					
N/A	25-31 Jul	2020	Société des Régates du Havre	Le Havre, Normandy	France	CANCELLED COVID								
N/A	24-29 Aug	2021	Société des Régates du Havre	Le Havre, Normandy	France	CANCELLED COVID								
59	23-29 Jul	2022	Real Club Náutico de Vigo	Vigo, Galicia	Spain	170	10	4	85	42	18	19	6	
60	22-28 Jul	2023	Société des Régates du Havre	Le Havre, Normandy	France	112	10	2	56	29	4	18	5	-
61	13-19 Jul	2024	Yacht Club Limar		Slovakia	108	10	2	54	23	2	22	7	
62	12-19 Jul	2025	Centro Vela Bracciano	Bracciano, Lazio	Italy	187	8	2	92	46	11	25	12	
63	18-24 Jul	2026	Part of Travemünde Woche	Travemünde	Germany	118	9	3	59	21	5	27	6	

== Medalists ==
year	Gold	Silver	Bronze	Ref.
1966 Orbetello (Italy)	Italy; Fabio Gavazzi; Fabrizio Gavazzi	Switzerland; Wissard; Mounoud	Switzerland; Kessler; Ischer	
1967 Radolfzell (Germany)	West Germany; Behrens	France; Thierry	Netherlands; C.J. In't Veld	
1968 Vilassar (Spain)	France; Quevarec; Quevarec	France; Deboudé; Heky	France; Saint-Blancat; Boisard	
1969 Neuchâtel (Switzerland)	France; Quevarec; Quevarec	Netherlands; Rob Meyer	Italy; Gavazzi Fabio	
1970 Medemblik (Netherlands)	Netherlands; Rob Meijer; Tony van Oeveren	Netherlands; Peter Tans; Harm Prop	Netherlands; Bob Huisenaar; Marijke In't Veld	
1971 Ostende (Belgium)	Netherlands; Peter Tans; Harm Prop	France; Ronan le Bihan; Marg. Paulet	France; Lauret; Lauret	
1972 Brest (France)	France; Quéméneur; Quéméneur	France; Lauret; Lauret	France; Philippe Bessec; G. Routier	
1973 Maputo - Lourenço Marques (Mozambique)	France; Philippe Bessec; G. Routier	France; Dominique le Bihan; Michel Jacq	France; Ronan le Bihan; Marg. Paulet	
1974 Premiá de Mar (Spain)	Spain; Alejandro Abascal; L. Lopez-Alonso	France; Ronan le Bihan; M. le Bihan	France; A. Menard; Babin	
1975 Livorno (Italy)	Netherlands; Chris Frijdal; Erik Versloot	Switzerland; Lorenz Müller; Thomas Schweizer	Netherlands; Rien Segaar; Frouk Segaar Hulsman	
1976 Monte-Carlo (Monaco)	Spain; Pedro Campos; Juan Santana	Netherlands; Rien Segaar; Frouk Segaar Hulsman	Netherlands; Erik Bieze; Jellie van der Steeg	
1977 Kiel (Germany)	Netherlands; Willy van Bladel; Cees van Bladel	Netherlands; Chris Frijdal; Erik Bieze	Netherlands; Rob Sepers; Ron Sepers	
1978 Casablanca (Morocco)	Spain; Andrade; Andrade	Spain; Sammartin; Lago	Italy; Andrea Porro; Ugo Porro	
1979 San Sebastian (Spain)	Spain; Andrade; Andrade	Spain; Pedro Campos; Dominguez	Netherlands; Rien Segaar; Frouk Segaar Hulsman	
1980 Povoa de Varzim (Portugal)	Portugal; Ant. Roquette; Fr. Campos	France; G. Alonso; Patrick de Haz	France; J.Y. Drogou; H. Drogou	
1981 Medemblik (Netherlands)	West Germany; Martin Fuchs; Robert Montau	Netherlands; Hans Duetz; Margreet Duetz	Netherlands; Rob Sepers; Ron Sepers	
1982 Capodimonte (Italy)	Netherlands; Hans Duetz; Margreet Duetz	Spain; Carlos Martinez; Guillermo Beltri	Netherlands; Johan Pragt; Mirjam Pragt	
1983 Brest (France)	Netherlands van Ek; Visser	Netherlands; Schurmans; Duetz	Spain; Tudela; Tudela	
1984 Hospitalet del Infante (Spain)	Netherlands; Johan Pragt; Mirjam Pragt	Netherlands van der Steeg van der Steeg	Netherlands van Ek; Baerveldt	
1985 Vada (Italy)	Netherlands; Schurmans; Abma	Italy; Fabio Gavazzi; Fabrizio Gavazzi	Italy; Scafati; Scafati	
1986 Vingelz (Switzerland)	Netherlands van de Meulen; Visser	Netherlands; Schurmans; Abma	Spain; Tudela; Gourez	
1987 Medemblik (Netherlands)	Netherlands; Reindert van de Meulen	Netherlands; Sipke; Schurmans	Netherlands; Ron Sepers; Sepers	
1988 Viana do Castelo (Portugal)	Netherlands; Schurmans; Abma	Netherlands; Ron Sepers; Sepers	Spain; Angelo Gutierrez; Antonio Plaza	
1989 Überlingen (Germany)	Italy; Marco Faccenda; Marco Cerri	Italy; Ugo Alvazzi; Luca Merlini	Belgium; J. Lemaire; C. Hastrais	
1990 Nettuno (Italy)	Italy; Marco Faccenda; Marco Cerri	Spain; Guillermo Beltrí; José A. Beltrí	Netherlands de Liefde de Liefde	
1991 Laredo (Spain)	Italy; Marco Faccenda; Marco Cerri	Netherlands; Bodegom de Liefde	Spain; Marino; Infante	
1992 Piriac-sur-Mer (France)	Italy; Marco Faccenda; Giovanni Ruberti	Austria; Klaus Diem; S. Hafner	Netherlands; Frans Hin; Janneke Hin	
1993 Gravedona (Italy)	Spain; Javier Coello Nunez; Francisco Tartinez Marti	Spain; Mikel Vazquez; Juigo Hierro	Italy; Giorgio Marchetilli; Corrado Tartarini	
1994 Lipno (Czech Republic)	Klaus Diem (AUT); Mark Kalkowski (GER)	Spain; Angelo Gutierrez; Antonio Plaza	Italy; Francesco Zampacavallo; Gian Luca Filippone	
1995 Setúbal (Portugal)	Spain; Javier Coello Nunez; Rocio Coello Nunez	Italy; Marco Faccenda; Giovanni Ruberti	Italy; Francesco Zampacavallo; Gian Luca Filippone	
1996 Hoorn (Netherlands)	Spain; Javier Coello Nunez; Rocio Coello Nunez	Italy; Francesco Zampacavallo; Gian Luca Filippone	Italy; Giovanni Ruberti; Francesco Salghetti	
1997 Los Nietos (Spain)	Spain; Javier Valverde; J. Valverde	Spain; Javier Coello Nunez; Rocio Coello Nunez	Spain; Francisco Javier Serrano; Rosa Foruria Delmas	
1998 Radolfzell (Germany)	Italy; Marco Faccenda; Marco Cerri	Italy; Leonardo Neri; Fabrizio Richard	Italy; Francesco Zampacavallo; Gian Luca Filippone	
1999 Vilamoura (Portugal)	Spain; Francisco Javier Serrano; Rosa Foruria Delmas	Spain; Juan Barrionuevo; Rocio Coello	Spain; Jesus Barrionuevo; Ambrosio Pedreno	
2000 Loctudy (France)	Spain; Francisco Javier Serrano; Rosa Foruria Delmas	Giovanni Ruberti (ITA); Anne Sophie Vanhollebeke (FRA)	Spain; Jesus Barrionuevo; Ambrosio Pedreno	
2001 Follonica (Italy)	Spain; Alberto M. Albaladejo; Jose M. Albaladejo	Spain; Francisco Javier Serrano; Rosa Foruria Delmas	Spain; Eliseo Belzunce; Jaione Ayastuy	
2002 Povoa de Varzim (Portugal)	Spain; Eliseo Belzunce; M. Alvarez	Spain; Javier Porto; Alberto Martín	Spain; A. Martinez; A. Rodriguez	
2003 Stavoren (Netherlands)	Spain; Jesus Amaliach; Miguel Amaliach	Spain; Jesus Barrionuevo; Jose Soto	Spain; Francisco Javier Serrano; Rosa Foruria Delmas	
2004 Punta del Este (Uruguay)	Spain; Javier Porto; Alberto Martín	Spain; Pablo Cabello; Pablo Iglesias	Uruguay; Pablo Defazio; Alberto Balpar	
2005 Sanxenxo (Spain)	Spain; Javier Porto; Alberto Martín	Spain; Francisco Javier Serrano; Carlos Frances Armengot	Italy; Marco Faccenda; Francesco Granchi	
2006 Vada (Italy)	Spain; Javier Porto; Alberto Martín	Spain; Francisco Javier Serrano; Rosa Foruria	Spain; Ignacio Campos; Asunción Liminana	
2007 Laredo (Spain)	Spain; Francisco Javier Serrano; Rosa Foruria	Spain; Javier Porto; Alberto Martín	Italy; Marco Faccenda; Francesco Granchi	
2008 Matosinhos (Portugal)	Italy; Marco Faccenda; Giovanni Galassini	Italy; Francesco Granchi; Marco Melfa	Spain; Pablo Cabello; Javier Lago	
2009 Bizerte (Tunisia)	Italy; Marco Faccenda; Giovanni Galassini	Italy; Olmo Cerri; Edoardo Meini	Spain; Jaime Leiros; Alfonso Leiros	
2010 Liptovsky Mikulas (Slovakia)	Italy; Olmo Cerri; Edoardo Meini	Slovakia; Miroslav Baran; Maroš Baran	Italy; Francesco Graziani; Marco Melfa	
2011 Dümmer See (Germany)	Slovakia; Miroslav Baran; Maroš Baran	Spain; Jaime Leiros; Alfonso Leiros	Italy; Olmo Cerri; Edoardo Meini	
2012 Douarnenez (France)	Spain; Jaime Leiros; Alfonso Leiros	Netherlands; Roelof Kuipers; Jelmer Kuipers	Spain; Francisco Javier Serrano; Rosa Foruria	
2013 Sanxenxo (Spain)	Francesco Zampacavallo (ITA); Carlos Frances Armengot (ESP)	Slovakia; Miroslav Baran; Maroš Baran	Spain; Jaime Leiros; Alfonso Leiros	
2014 Marina di Grosseto (Italy)	Italy; Ettore Botticini; Lorenzo Gennari	Italy; Marco Faccenda; Niccolò Bertola	Netherlands; Roelof Kuipers; Jelmer Kuipers	
2015 Sneek (Netherlands)	Italy; Niccolò Bertola; Jacopo Izzo	Netherlands; Roelof Kuipers; Jelmer Kuipers	Spain; Antonio Pérez Castro; Gonzalo Martínez Rodríguez	
2016 Viana do Castelo (Portugal)	Netherlands; Michiel Sickler; Kristy de Leeuw	Spain; Antonio Pérez Castro; Santiago Moreno	Netherlands; Roelof Kuipers; Jelmer Kuipers	
2017 Gudowo (Poland)	Spain; Pablo Cabello; Javier Lago	Italy; Olmo Cerri; Elisa Gesess	Italy; Marco Faccenda; Alessio Francia	
2018 Travemünde (Germany)	Francesco Zampacavallo (ITA); Carlos Frances Armengot (ESP)	Spain; Antonio Pérez Castro; Lucia Llopiz	Spain; Tirso Cerqueira Atarés; Gonzalo Martínez Rodríguez	
2019 Colico (Italy)	Italy; Niccolò Bertola; Mattia Carmelo Saggio	Italy; Francesco Graziani; Alessandro Golinelli	Spain; Pablo Cabello; Mario Perez	
2022 Vigo (Spain)	Marco Faccenda (ITA); Marcello Miliardi (ITA)	Francesco Zampacavallo (ITA); Carlos Frances Armengot (ESP)	Pablo Cabello (ESP); David Fernandez (ESP)	
2023 Le Havre (France)	Francesco Zampacavallo (ITA); Carlos Frances Armengot (ESP)	Antonio Pérez Castro (ESP); Paloma González Esteban (ESP)	Brieuc Drogou (FRA); Daan Stoel (NED)	
2024 Liptovská Mara (Slovakia)	Francesco Graziani (ITA); Marta Delli (ITA)	Thibault Vandrot (FRA); Nadia El Ghozi (FRA)	Pablo Cabello (ESP); Isabel Cabello (ESP)	
2025 Bracciano (Italy)	Niccolo' Bertola (ITA); Mattia Saggio (ITA)	Pablo Cabello Viéitez (ESP); Isabel Cabello Cañas (ESP)	Olmo Cerri (ITA); Gioia Bertolani (ITA)	
2026 (Germany)	Olmo Cerri (ITA); Gioia Bertolani (ITA)	Pablo Cabello Vieitez (ESP); Isabel Cabello Cañas (ESP)	François-Xavier Drogou (FRA); Caroline Guilloux (FRA)	
