= 1992 Louis Vuitton Cup =

3rd Louis Vuitton Cup
Event information
- Type: Challenge race for America's Cup
- Dates: 25 January - 30 April 1992
- Host city: San Diego, California
- Boats: Il Moro di Venezia (Italy); Australian Challenge (Australia); Desafio Español Copa America (Spain); Le Defi Francais 95 (France); Nippon Challenge (Japan); New Zealand Challenge; Swedish America's Cup Challenge (Sweden)

Results
- Winner: Il Moro di Venezia (Italy)

Succession
- Previous: 1987 Louis Vuitton Cup
- Next: 1995 Louis Vuitton Cup

The 3rd Louis Vuitton Cup was held in San Diego, United States in 1992. The winner, Il Moro di Venezia, went on to challenge for the 1992 America's Cup.

== Teams ==
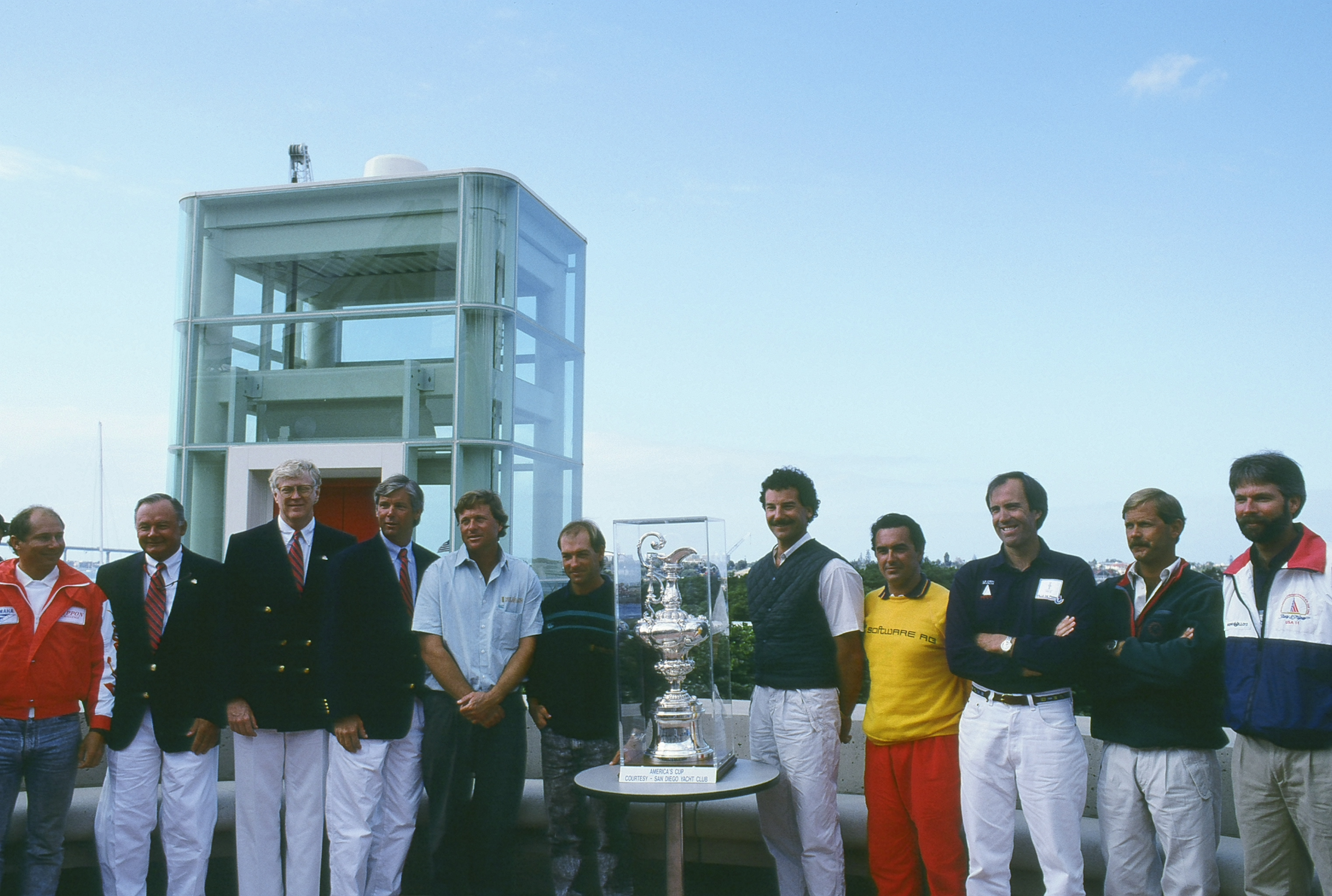
The skippers of the 1992 Louis Vuitton Cup

Eight challengers from seven nations contested the 1992 Louis Vuitton Cup. Together they spent over $250 million. Il Moro di Venezia alone constructed four boats and spent over $85 million.

Club	Team	Skipper	Yachts
(Italy) Compagnia della Vela di Venezia	Il Moro di Venezia	(United States) Paul Cayard	ITA-25
Cruising Yacht Club of Australia	Australian Challenge	(Australia) Syd Fischer	AUS-17
(Australia) Darling Harbour Yacht Club	Spirit of Australia	(Australia) Peter Gilmour	AUS-21
(Spain) Monte Real Club de Yates de Bayona	Desafio Español Copa America	(Spain) Pedro Campos Calvo-Sotelo	ESP-22
(France) Yacht Club de Sète	Le Defi Francais 95	(France) Marc Pajot	FRA-27
(Japan) Nippon Ocean Racing Club	Nippon Challenge	(New Zealand) Chris Dickson	JPN-26
(New Zealand) Mercury Bay Boating Club	New Zealand Challenge	(New Zealand) Rod Davis	NZL-20
(Sweden) Stenungsbaden Yacht Club	Swedish America's Cup Challenge	(Sweden) Gunnar Krantz	SWE-19

=== Il Moro di Venezia ===
The Italian challenge Il Moro Challenge was funded by Raul Gardini and skippered by American Paul Cayard. The primary designer was Germán Frers and the operations manager was Laurent Esquier. John Kolius was involved but could not sail as he had not completed his Italian eligibility requirements. Tommaso Chieffi was the tactician and Enrico Chieffi was the navigator. Other crew included Robert Hopkins and Steven Erickson.

=== Australian Challenge ===
From Sydney's Cruising Yacht Club of Australia, the Australian Challenge was skippered by Syd Fischer. Colin Beashel was the helmsman and Hugh Treharne the tactician.

=== Spirit of Australia ===
A second Australian challenge from Sydney, Spirit of Australia was headed by Iain Murray, skippered by Peter Gilmour and the team included Tom Schnackenberg.

=== Desafio Español Copa America ===
From Spain, ESP-22 was skippered by Pedro Campos Calvo-Sotelo and coached by Peter Lester. The crew included Antonio Gorostegui.

=== Le Defi Francais 95 ===
Le Defi Francais 95 was skippered by Marc Pajot. Bertrand Pacé was the backup helmsman and navigator.

=== Nippon Challenge ===
The first entry from Japan, Nippon Challenge was skippered by Chris Dickson, who had fallen out with the New Zealand Challenge during the 1987 Louis Vuitton Cup. John Cutler was the tactician and the crew included Erle Williams and Mike Spanhake.

=== New Zealand Challenge ===
Michael Fay financed what would be his final New Zealand Challenge. Managed by Peter Blake, the team was skippered by Rod Davis and NZL 20's crew included tactician David Barnes, bow, Alan Smith; mid-bow, David Brooke; mast, Barry McKay; pit, Denis Kendall; floater, Mark Hauser; grinders, Andrew Taylor and Sean Clarkson; genoa trimmers, Kevin Shoebridge and Grant Loretz; mainsheet traveler, Don Cowie; mainsheet trimmer, Simon Daubney; and running backstays, Tony Rae and Peter Evans. Russell Coutts sailed the second boat and additional crew members included Chris Salthouse, Robbie Naismith, Ross Halcrow, Warwick Fleury, Matt Mason, Dean Phipps, Gavin Brady and Nick Heron.

Coutts and Brad Butterworth replaced Davis and Barnes during the Louis Vuitton Cup finals.

=== Swedish America's Cup Challenge ===
From the Stenungsbaden Yacht Club, the challenge was skippered by Gunnar Krantz.

== Round robin ==
Team name	Races	Won	RR1 Pts.	RR2 Pts.	RR3 Pts.	Total Pts.	Ranking
(Japan) Nippon Challenge	21	18	6	20	56	82	1
New Zealand Challenge	21	18	6	28	40	74	2
(Italy) Il Moro di Venezia	21	16	5	24	40	69	3
(France) Le Defi Francais 95	21	14	5	16	40	61	4
(Spain) Desafio Español Copa America	21	7	2	12	16	30	5
Spirit of Australia	21	7	3	8	16	27	6
(Sweden) Swedish America's Cup Challenge	21	3	1	4	8	13	7
Australia Challenge	21	1	0	0	8	8	8

During RR1 a team scored 1 point per win. During RR2 a team scored 4 points per win. During RR3 a team scored 8 points per win.

== Finals ==
=== Semi finals ===
Team name	Races	Won	Ranking
New Zealand Challenge	9	7	1
(Italy) Il Moro di Venezia	9	5	2
(Japan) Nippon Challenge	9	3	3=
(France) Le Defi Francais 95	9	3	3=

=== Final ===
Team Name	1	2	3	4	5	6	7	8	9	T
New Zealand Challenge	W (1:32)	L	W (0:34)	W (2:26)	W (2:38)*	L	L	L	L	3
(Italy) Il Moro di Venezia	L	W (0:01)	L	L	L*	W (0:43)	W (0:53)	W (0:20)	W (1:33)	5

*Race removed from records after Il Moro di Venezia were successful in a protest over New Zealand's bowsprit.
