= Eric Doyle (sailor) =

American sailor

Eric Doyle is an American Star class sailor. Doyle won the 1999 Star World Championships together with Tom Olsen. He has also participated in the Louis Vuitton Cup together with the Stars & Stripes and BMW Oracle Racing challenges.
