= Swan 60 =

Sailboat class

Development
- Designer: Germán Frers
- Location: Finland
- Year: 1994
- Builder: Oy Nautor AB
- Role: Racer-Cruiser

Hull
- Type: monohull
- Construction: glassfibre

Rig
- Rig type: Sloop

The Swan 60 is a Finnish racer-cruisers sailboat that was designed by Germán Frers.

A later, unrelated design introduced in 2000 was also marketed as the Swan 60, but is now usually referred to by its sub-model designation of Swan 60 FD and Swan 60 S to avoid confusion with this Swan 60 model.

== Production ==
The series was built by Oy Nautor AB in Finland, starting in 1994, but it is now out of production.

The design was offered in both "Regatta" and cruiser-racer models and was still in production until 1997. The first Swan 60, named Highland Fling was introduced in 1994 and was delivered to Irvine Laidlaw, Baron Laidlaw and raced successfully including winning the Swan European and World championships, plus the Key West Regatta two years in a row.

== Variants ==
Swan 60
This model was introduced in 1994 and still advertised in 1997. This cruiser-racer model has a heavier and shallower draft keel compared to the Regatta version. The cruiser-racer model has a PHRF racing average handicap of -6.
Swan 60 R
"Regatta" racing version of the Swan 60 introduced in 1994 and still advertised for sale in 1997. The Regatta has a deeper, but lighter keel. This model has a PHRF racing average handicap of -33 to -36.

== See also ==
- List of sailing boat types
