= Il Moro Challenge =

America's Cup class boats 1992

Career
- Yacht club: Compagnia della Vela di Venezia
- Established: 1992
- Nation: Italy
- Team principal(s): Raul Gardini
- Skipper: Paul Cayard
- Notable victories: 1992 Louis Vuitton Cup

Yachts
- Sail no.: Boat name
- ITA–1: Il Moro di Venezia
- ITA–7: Il Moro di Venezia II
- ITA–15: Il Moro di Venezia III
- ITA–16: Il Moro di Venezia IV
- ITA–25: Il Moro di Venezia V

Il Moro Challenge was a 1992 Italian America's Cup team headed by industrialist Raul Gardini. The team won the 1992 Louis Vuitton Cup but failed to win the 28th America's Cup.

== Early years ==
International America's Cup Class boats (IACC) were a completely new design in 1992, replacing the 12 Meter boats that had competed for the America's Cup from 1958 to 1987.

Gardini brought together an international group of designers, managers and sailors in his attempt to win the America's Cup. The primary designer was Argentine architect German Frers assisted by American Robert Hopkins. The yard director was Portuguese Fernando Sena, the operations manager was Frenchman Laurent Esquier and the skipper was French-American Paul Cayard.

Design work began at the end of 1988 and construction of the first Il Moro started in 1990. Il Moro di Venezia I (ITA-1) was the very first hull built for the new generation (IACC) rule, and was launched on 11 March 1990 in Venice. Il Moro di Venezia II (ITA-7) was launched on 7 August 1990 in Palma de Mallora, followed by Il Moro di Venezia III (ITA-15) launched on 15 April 1991 in San Diego, Il Moro di Venezia IV (ITA-16) launched on 15 June 1991 in San Diego and finally, Il Moro di Venezia V (ITA-25) launched on 16 December 1991 in San Diego.

== The boats ==
=== ITA-1 ===
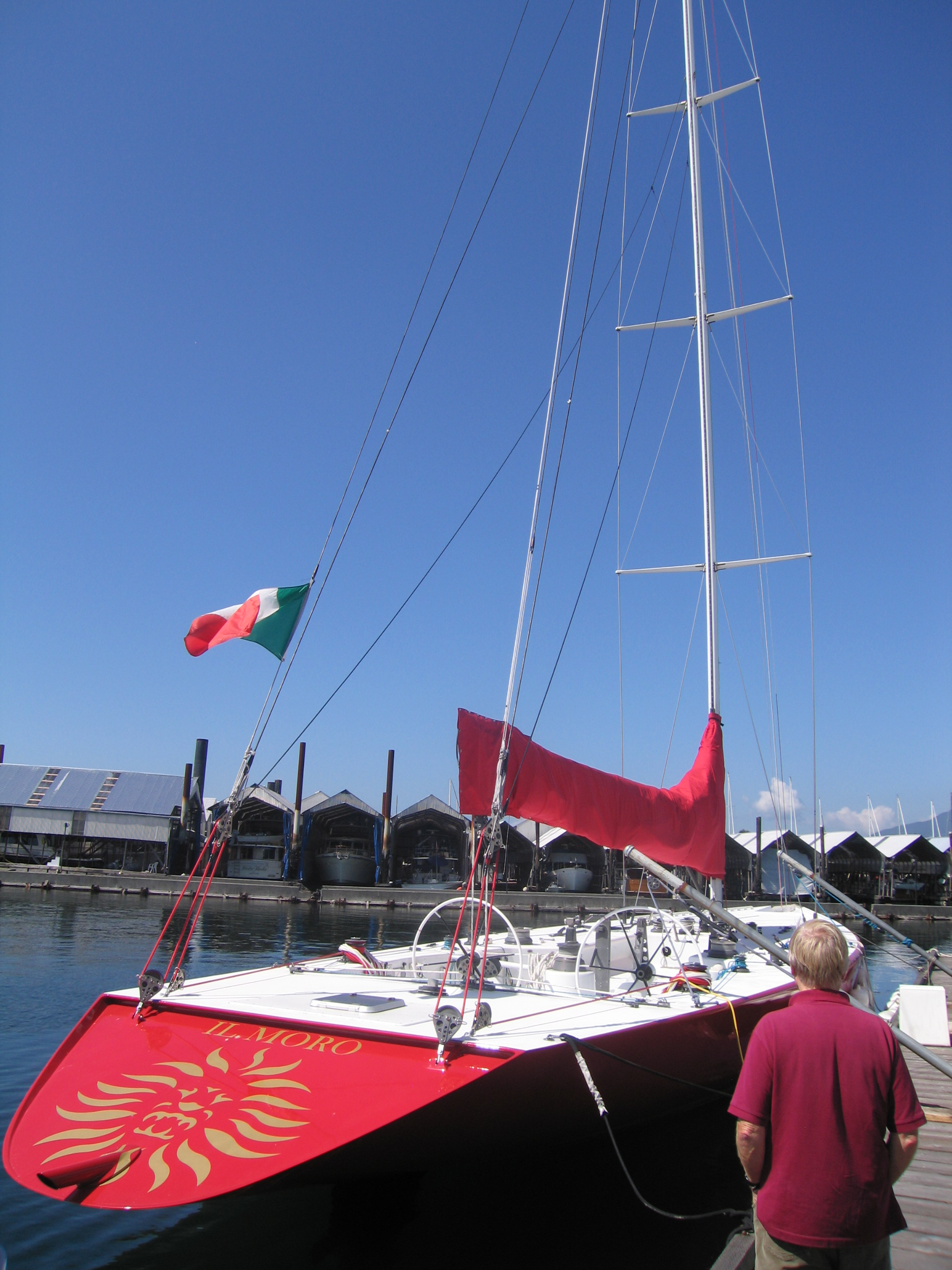
Il Moro di Venezia I in North Vancouver, 2013

Il Moro di Venezia I (ITA-1) sailed as a trial boat for two years and competed in the 1991 IACC World Championships, later becoming the sponsor platform for the syndicate. In 1994 she was bought by a Russian team that raced her in the 1994 IACC World Championships but never made it to the 1995 Louis Vuitton Cup competition. Repossessed by a bank, she was bought in 1998 by a Chicago businessman who installed an engine and sailed her for a couple of years in San Diego before she once again fell victim to the bank. Tina Kleinjan and John Sweeney bought her in 2001, adding her to their fleet of IACC boats in San Francisco. They completely restored her with new paint and rigging and raced her against other IACC boats in San Francisco bay. She was sold for the last time in 2006 and is currently moored in North Vancouver.

=== ITA-7 ===
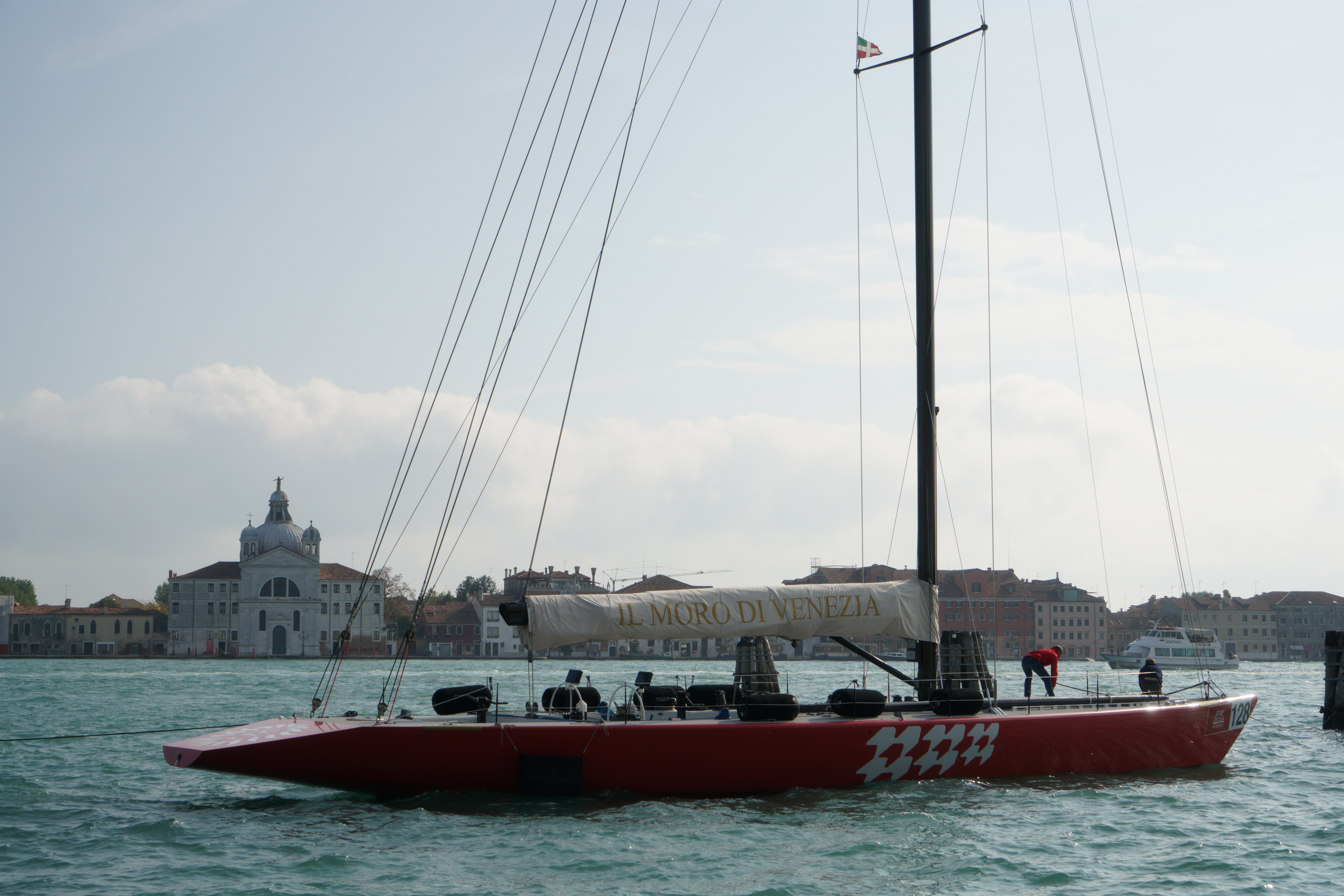
Il Moro di Venezia II (ITA 07), 2019, Venezia

Il Moro di Venezia II (ITA-7) Launched the 7 of August 1990 she was used as a trial boat prior to the Louis Vuitton Cup. She was later restored by Claudio Carraro and now is moored in Venice attending to a lot of sailing events.

=== ITA-15 ===
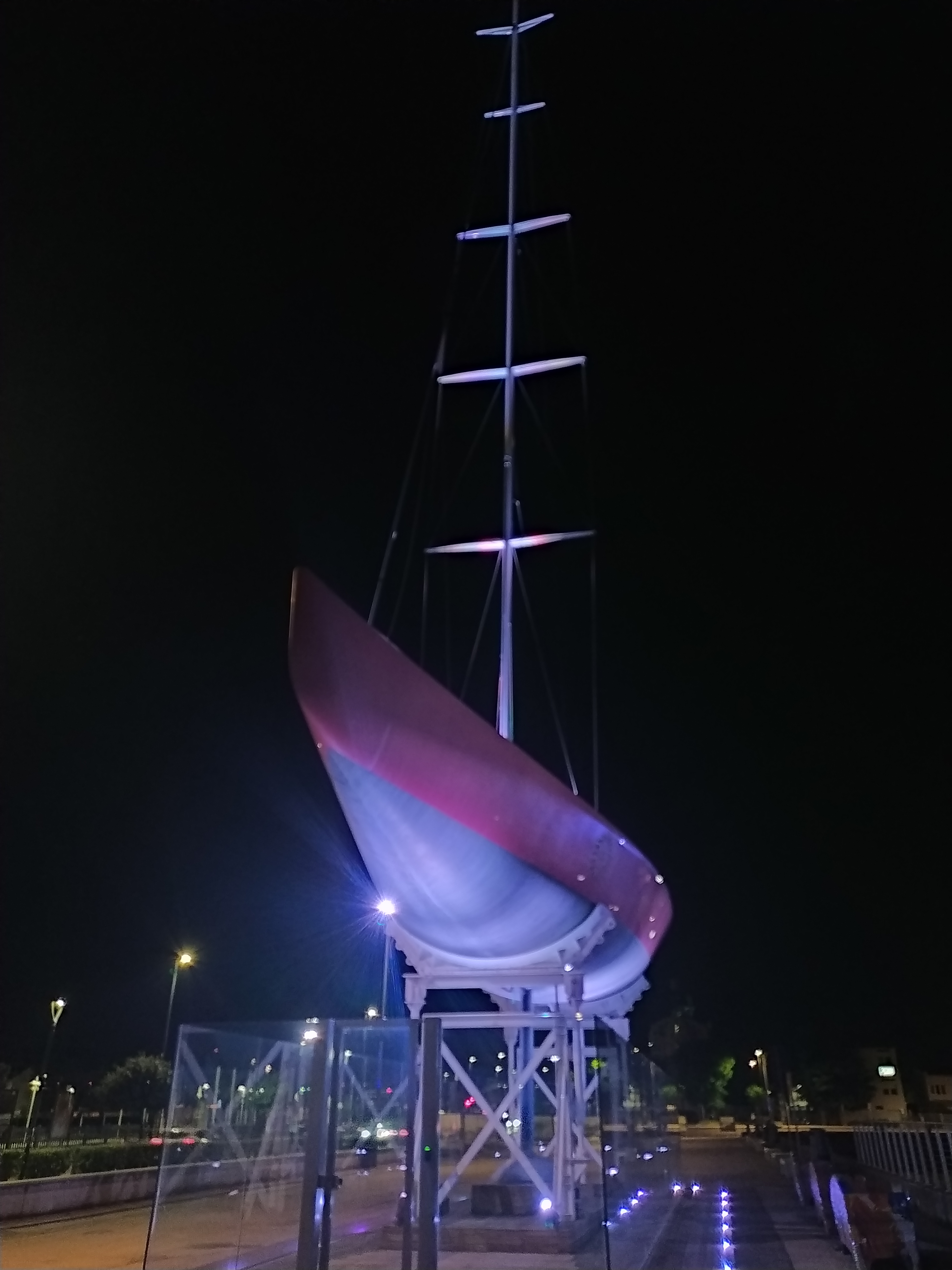
Moro di Venezia III (ITA-15), Ravenna

Il Moro di Venezia III (ITA–15) won the 1991 IACC World Championship, and was used as a trial boat prior to the Louis Vuitton Cup. Later, she sailed for the Sail Academy in Genoa, Italy, was purchased by another Italian team, +39, in July 2004, and finally acquired by America's Cup Management to be used as a VIP/PR boat in Valencia, Spain. Today the owner is Autorità portuale di Ravenna and she is placed on land close to their offices.

=== ITA-16 ===
Il Moro di Venezia IV (ITA–16) was used as a trial boat, but did not race in the Louis Vuitton Cup. Purchased by an American team, PACT 95, she was renamed Spirit of Unum and re-designated USA–16. She raced in the 1994 IACC World Championships and was used as a trial boat for PACT 95's 1995 America's Cup effort until she was T-boned by Ville de Paris, a practice boat for the Defi 95 French Challenge, leaving a 4-foot-wide (1.2 m) hole just above the water line. She was retired that day, but later repaired and sailed in the UK under the name Right Time to help promote interest in the America's Cup races. In 2006 she was sold to Tom Cahalane of Team Il Moro by international yacht brokers Nicolle Associates and shipped to Ventura, California, but was never completely reassembled. In October 2009, she was acquired by Stephen Pattison & Mark Niblack, of Carbon Performance Sailing, LLC (dba: SAIL USA-11.) She has returned to her launch site in San Diego where she is undergoing restoration and will join USA-11. In 2011 she was purchased by Bee and Lynn Hanna as part of America's Cup Sailing Charters in San Diego.

=== ITA–25 ===
Il Moro di Venezia V (ITA–25), was selected on 24 January 1992 to compete in the Louis Vuitton Cup. In the race to the finals, Il Moro di Venezia V won 21 of 30 races, but came into the finals second behind NZL–20. After five races, Il Moro di Venezia V was down by 4 to 1 (though the last win by New Zealand was protested and annulled, making it 3 to 1.) But Il Moro di Venezia V came back with four straight wins to take the Louis Vuitton Cup and the right to challenge Bill Koch of America³ for the 1992 America's Cup. In May 1992, she lost the best of seven series against America³, USA–23, 1 to 4, though the margins were very close, ranging from 3 seconds to one minute, 58 seconds. In 1997 she was bought by AmericaOne to be used as a trial boat. In 2001 she was bought by the OneWorld. Finally, she was acquired by Bill Koch who completely restored her. She raced once more against USA–23 in the America's Cup Jubilee Regatta at Cowes, U.K. In 2005 she joined USA–23 for the final time, on display in front of the Boston Museum of Fine Arts (MFA.)

== 1992 Challenge ==
Il Moro di Venezia V won the 1992 Louis Vuitton Cup however, despite being favourites, they were unable to win the 1992 America's Cup.

== 1995 Challenge ==
The team was preparing to participate in the 1995 Louis Vuitton Cup but the bid collapsed after the death of the syndicate director Raul Gardini.

== See also ==
- Italy at the America's Cup
- Compagnia della Vela
