= Colin Beashel =

Australian sailor (born 1959)

Personal information
- Full name: Colin Kenneth Beashel
- Born: 21 November 1959 (age 66) Sydney, New South Wales
- Height: 181 cm (5 ft 11 in)
- Weight: 87 kg (192 lb)

Sailing career
- Sport: Sailing
- Club: Royal Prince Alfred Yacht Club
Medal record
Sailing
Representing Australia
Olympic Games
Bronze medal – third place	1996 Atlanta	Star class

Colin Kenneth Beashel (born 21 November 1959) is an Australian sailor who crewed on the winning America's Cup team Australia II in 1983 and competed at six Olympics between 1984 and 2004, winning bronze in 1996. He became, jointly with Brazilian Torben Grael, the eighth sailor to compete at six Olympics. He helmed Australia Challenge at the 1992 Louis Vuitton Cup.

Born in Sydney, Beashel comes from a sailing family. His father Ken is a local sailing legend. His brother Adam was a sailor for Team New Zealand in the America's Cup in 2003, 2007 and 2013. Adam's wife Lanee Butler sailed at four Olympics.

Beashel competed at the Olympics in the two-person keelboat, with Richard Coxon in 1984, Gregory Torpy in 1988, and David Giles from 1992 to 2004. He and Giles also won the World Championships in 1998 in the Star class. He now runs the family boat shop in Elvina Bay, Pittwater.

== See also ==
- List of athletes with the most appearances at Olympic Games
