= Matt Mason (sailor) =

New Zealand sailor

Matthew Mason (born in Whangarei) is a New Zealand sailor known as ’Little Matt’.

He sailed the Sydney to Hobart Yacht Race for five consecutive races between 1984 and 1988. He joined New Zealand Challenge for the 1992 Louis Vuitton Cup challenge. Mason sailed on the 1993–94 Whitbread Round the World Race with Winston.

He then joined Team New Zealand and was part of the crew on NZL 32 that won the 1995 America's Cup. He was then part of their 2003 America's Cup defence before joining oneWorld Challenge for the 2003 Louis Vuitton Cup. Mason is a boatbuilder and was also involved in the construction of NZL 32, NZL 38, NZL 57 and NZL 60.

He re-joined Team New Zealand for the 2007 America's Cup. He then joined Oracle Racing and sailed on USA 17 when it won the 2010 America's Cup. During the 2013 America's Cup, Mason was in charge of a surveillance boat that got too close to Luna Rossa Challenge.
