= Raul Gardini =

Italian agri-business and chemicals tycoon (1933–1993)

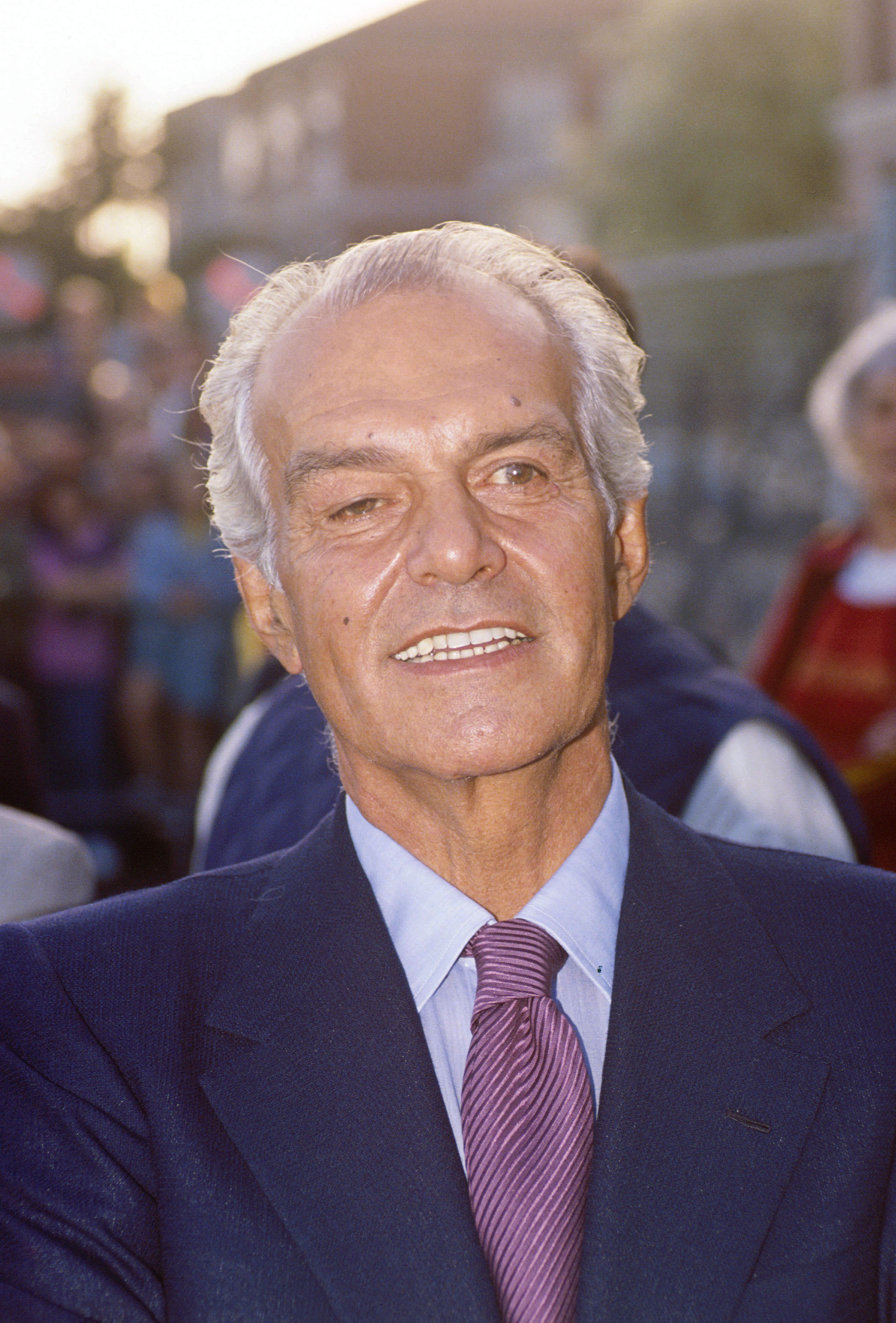
- Raul Gardini in 1990
- Born: 7 June 1933; Ravenna, Italy
- Died: 23 July 1993 (aged 60); Milan, Italy
- Education: University of Bologna

Raul Gardini (7 June 1933 – 23 July 1993) was an Italian agri-business and chemicals tycoon. In 1980, he took the helm of his father-in-law Serafino Ferruzzi's family business, starting an aggressive campaign that led to the acquisition of the French sugar and paper company Beghin-Say SA, turning Ferruzzi into Europe's leading sugar producer. In 1985, Gardini focused his interest on chemicals and bought stock in the Montedison chemical group. By 1987, he had acquired 42 per cent of the group, turning Ferruzzi-Montedison into Italy's second largest industrial group after the state-owned company Eni. In 1989, Eni and Montedison formed a joint-venture called Enimont.

Gardini studied at the Agricultural Institute of Cesena where he obtained the diploma of agricultural expert. Subsequently, he enrolled in the Faculty of Agriculture - University of Bologna; In 1987 he was awarded an honorary degree in agriculture by the University of Bologna. In 1992, Gardini set up a sailing team to compete in America's Cup. Paul Cayard was hired as manager and skipper, leading Il Moro di Venezia to win the 1992 Louis Vuitton Cup.

In 1993, Gardini was embroiled in the Tangentopoli scandal following a failed bid to take control of Enimont. In the same year, he committed suicide in Milan.

== Publications ==
- Raul Gardini, A modo mio, a cura di Cesare Peruzzi, Milano, Arnoldo Mondadori Editore, 1991. ISBN 978-8804355243
