= David O'Brien (sailor) =

Irish sailor

David O'Brien (born 26 May 1965) is an Irish former yacht racer who competed in the 2000 Summer Olympics.
