= Marco Testa =

Swiss footballer (born 1961)

Personal information
- Date of birth: 3 September 1961 (age 65)
- Position: Defender

Senior career*
Years	Team	Apps	(Gls)
1981–1990	FC Chiasso		

Managerial career
- 2001: FC Chiasso
- * Club domestic league appearances and goals

Marco Testa (born 3 September 1961) is a retired Swiss football defender.
