= David Giles (sailor) =

Australian sailor

David Giles (born 27 November 1964) was an Australian competitive sailor and Olympic medalist. He won a bronze medal in the Star class at the 1996 Summer Olympics in Atlanta, together with Colin Beashel. He competed with Colin Beashel in the Star class sailing at every Olympic regatta from Barcelona 1992 through to Athens 2004. He was an Australian Institute of Sport scholarship holder.
