= Richard Coxon =

Australian sailor

Personal information
- Nationality: Australian
- Born: 14 January 1945 (age 80)

Sport
- Sport: Sailing

Richard Coxon (born 14 January 1945) is an Australian sailor. He competed in the Star event at the 1984 Summer Olympics.
