= Louis Vuitton Trophy La Maddalena =

Regatta that compete for the Louis Vuitton Trophy

- Location: La Maddalena, Italy
- Dates: 22 May - 6 June 2010
- Winner: Team New Zealand

The Louis Vuitton Trophy La Maddalena was the third in a scheduled series of regattas that compete for the Louis Vuitton Trophy. The regatta occurred in La Maddalena between 22 May - 6 June 2010. The Louis Vuitton Trophy format uses existing International America's Cup Class yachts loaned to the regatta by various America's Cup racing syndicates, keeping costs relatively low for the competing teams.

The Louis Vuitton Trophy was organised after the success of the Louis Vuitton Pacific Series and the continued legal battle surrounding the America's Cup yachting competition at the time. Because of the long delays from the legal action, and the fact that the 2010 America's Cup became a Deed of Gift match without a defender or challenger selection series, the Louis Vuitton Trophy series was established as a competition for other America's Cup racing syndicates.

The La Maddalena event was hosted by Mascalzone Latino and the Reale Yacht Club Canottieri Savoia.

== The Yachts ==
The event used International America's Cup Class yachts loaned specifically for the event. For La Maddalena, the boats were supplied by BMW Oracle Racing (USA 87 and USA 98) and Mascalzone Latino Audi Team (ITA 90 and ITA 99).

USA 87 and 98 were damaged on day four when they collided. They were unavailable for the rest of the regatta.

== Teams ==
La Maddalena attracted ten racing syndicates, increasing from the eight teams that appeared in the earlier Nice Côte d’Azur and Auckland Louis Vuitton Trophy regattas.

Ranking	Country	Team	Club	Skipper/Helmsman	Notes
1	New Zealand	Team New Zealand	Royal New Zealand Yacht Squadron	Dean Barker	
2	Russia	Team Synergy		Karol Jabłoński	
3	France	ALL4ONE	Cercle de la Voile de Paris	Jochen Schümann/Sébastien Col	
4	Sweden	Team Artemis	Royal Swedish Yacht Club	Paul Cayard/Terry Hutchinson	
5	Italy	Mascalzone Latino	Club Nautico di Roma	Gavin Brady	Host
6	Italy	Azzurra	Yacht Club Costa Smeralda	Francesco Bruni	
7	United Kingdom	Team Origin	Royal Thames Yacht Club	Ben Ainslie	
8	Italy	Luna Rossa	Yacht Club Italiano	Ed Baird	
9	United States	BMW Oracle Racing	Golden Gate Yacht Club	James Spithill	
10	France	Aleph		Bertrand Pacé	

== The Races ==
=== Round Robin ===
22 May-3 June

Team Name	Races	W	L	Pts
(France) (Germany) ALL4ONE	9	6	3	6
(Sweden) Team Artemis	9	6	3	6
Team New Zealand	9	6	3	6
(Italy) Mascalzone Latino	9	6	3	5*
(Russia) Synergy Russian	9	5	4	5
(Italy) Azzurra	9	4	5	4
(United Kingdom) Team Origin	9	4	5	4
(Italy) Luna Rossa	9	3	6	3
(United States) BMW Oracle Racing	9	3	6	3
(France) Aleph	9	2	7	-2*

	A4O	ART	APH	AZZ	TNZ	MAS	SYN	ORG	BMW	LRS	Pts
A4O		1	1	1	1	1	0	0	0	1	6
ART	0		1	1	1	0	0	1	1	1	6
APH	0	0		DSQ*	0	0	0	1	1	0	-2*
AZZ	0	0	1		0	0	1	1	0	1	4
TNZ	0	0	1	1		1	1	1	1	0	6
MAS	0*	1	1	1	0		1	1	0	1	5*
SYN	1	1	1	0	0	0		0	1	1	5
ORG	1	0	0	0	0	0	1		1	1	4
BMW	1	0	0	1	0	1	0	0		0	3
LRS	0	0	1	0	1	0	0	0	1		3

- Mascalzone Latino deducted a point for a 'hard contact' incident in their race against All4One.
- Aleph was immediately deducted a point for 'hard contact' when their boat collided with Azzura causing serious damage on day four. The international jury then deducted Aleph three further points for failing to avoid contact. The jury absolved Azzurra fully for the incident.
- BMW Oracle Racing vs Team New Zealand was originally sailed on the 28 May with BMW Oracle winning the match after Team New Zealand was penalised for not maintaining enough tension on their forestay. Team New Zealand immediately appealed the ruling but the international jury was unable to award them redress. The rule was removed from the book the next day and it was decided to resail the race. BMW Oracle then asked for redress but that was denied by the jury. Team New Zealand won the resail on the 30 May.

=== Elimination Finals ===
3–6 June
The final series was originally scheduled to use the McIntyre final eight system, as in Auckland. However, due to the loss of several days of racing, due to weather and the collision between USA 87 and USA 98, the finals were rescheduled to consist of knock out semi finals and a final. One quarterfinal was raced before the format was changed. The higher ranked team from each quarterfinal that was abandoned automatically advanced into the semifinals. The petit finale to decide third place was also canceled.

Seed	Team Name	1	2	3	Total
4	(Italy) Mascalzone Latino	0	1	0	1
5	(Russia) Synergy Russian	1	0	1	2

Seed	Team Name	1	2	3	Total
3	Team New Zealand	abandoned			
6	(Italy) Azzurra	abandoned			

Seed	Team Name	1	2	3	Total
2	(Sweden) Team Artemis	abandoned			
7	(United Kingdom) Team Origin	abandoned			

Seed	Team Name	1	2	3	Total
1	(France) (Germany) ALL4ONE	abandoned			
8	(Italy) Luna Rossa	abandoned			

Semifinals
(Sweden) Team Artemis	1	0	0	1
Team New Zealand	0	1	1	2
(France) (Germany) ALL4ONE	0	0	0
(Russia) Synergy Russian	1	1	2

Finals
Team New Zealand	3
(Russia) Synergy Russian	2

=== The Final ===
Team Name	1	2	3	4	5	T
Team New Zealand	0	0	1	1	1	3
(Russia) Synergy Russian	1	1	0	0	0	2

2010 Louis Vuitton Trophy La Maddalena
Team New Zealand
Second Title

== Junior Trophy ==
The junior trophy was sailed in O'Pen Bic dinghies off the mouth of the Marina Arsenale. The series was won by Giulio Bellitti, from Club Nautico Pesaro. He received a place as 18th man in one of the finalists.

Preceded by Auckland	Third Louis Vuitton Trophy Regatta; 22 May - 6 June 2010	Succeeded by Middle East
