= Louis Vuitton Trophy Auckland =

Regatta that compete for the Louis Vuitton Trophy

Date	7–21 March 2010
Winner	Team New Zealand
Location	Auckland, New Zealand

The Louis Vuitton Trophy Auckland was the second in a scheduled series of regattas that compete for the Louis Vuitton Trophy. The regatta was held in Auckland between 7–21 March 2010. The Louis Vuitton Trophy format uses existing International America's Cup Class yachts loaned to the regatta by various America's Cup racing syndicates, keeping costs low for the competing teams.

The Louis Vuitton Trophy was organised after the success of the Louis Vuitton Pacific Series and the continued legal battle surrounding the America's Cup yachting competition at the time. Because of the long delays from the legal action, and the fact that the 2010 America's Cup became a Deed of Gift match without a defender or challenger selection series, the Louis Vuitton Trophy series was established as a competition for other America's Cup racing syndicates.

The Auckland event was hosted by Team New Zealand and the Royal New Zealand Yacht Squadron.

== The Yachts ==
The event used two International America's Cup Class yachts loaned specifically for the event; Team New Zealand's NZL-92 and NZL-84. One of BMW Oracle Racing's old boats, USA-87, was on standby to be used as a backup in case of damage, but was not required.

== Teams ==
Eight teams competed in the Auckland event. BMW Oracle Racing did not compete due to the pressures of the 2010 America's Cup.

Ranking	Country	Team	Club	Skipper/Helmsman	Notes
1	New Zealand	Team New Zealand	Royal New Zealand Yacht Squadron	Dean Barker	Host
2	Italy	Mascalzone Latino	Club Nautico di Roma	Gavin Brady	
3	Italy	Azzurra	Yacht Club Costa Smeralda	Francesco Bruni	
4	Sweden	Team Artemis	Royal Swedish Yacht Club	Paul Cayard	
5	United Kingdom	Team Origin	Royal Thames Yacht Club	Ben Ainslie	
6	France	ALL4ONE	Cercle de la Voile de Paris	Jochen Schümann/Sébastien Col	
7	France	Aleph		Bertrand Pacé	
8	Russia	Team Synergy		Karol Jabłoński	

== The Races ==
=== Round Robin ===
7–16 March

Team Name	Races	W	L
Team New Zealand	7	6	1
(Italy) Mascalzone Latino Audi	7	5	2
(France) (Germany) ALL4ONE Challenge	7	4	3
(Italy) Azzurra	7	4	3
(Sweden) Team Artemis	7	4	3
(United Kingdom) Team Origin	7	3	4
(France) Aleph	7	2*	5
(Russia) Synergy Russian Sailing	7	0	7

	A4O	ART	APH	AZZ	TNZ	MAS	SYN	ORG	Total
A4O		0	1	1	0	1	1	0	4
ART	1		1	0	0	0	1	1	4
APH	0	0		0	1	0	1	0	2
AZZ	0	1	1		0	0	1	1	4
TNZ	1	1	0	1		1	1	1	6
MAS	0	1	1	1	0		1	1	5
SYN	0	0	0	0	0	0		0	0
ORG	1	0	1	0	0	0	1		3

*deducted a point for damaging the boats

=== Elimination Finals ===
17–20 March
The final series used the McIntyre final eight system, with all teams competing in the first elimination round. Team New Zealand and Mascalzone Latino Audi Team both earned a bye during the second elimination round. The second elimination round was scheduled for a best of three but was reduced to just one race due to low winds in the morning of the 18 March. As top seed after the first elimination round, Team New Zealand decided to face Azzurra in the Semifinals.

Seed	Team Name	1
4	Azzurra	0
5	Artemis	1

Seed	Team Name	1
3	ALL4ONE	0
6	Team Origin	1

Seed	Team Name	1
2	Mascalzone Latino	1
7	Aleph	0

Seed	Team Name	1
1	Team New Zealand	1
8	Synergy	0

Elimination Round 2
Team Origin	0
Artemis	1
Azzurra	1
ALL4ONE	0

Semifinals
Mascalzone Latino	2
Artemis	1
Azzurra	1
Team New Zealand	1

Final
Mascalzone Latino	0
Team New Zealand	1
Third place
Azzurra	1
Artemis	0

=== The Final ===
Team Name	1	2	3	4	5	T
Mascalzone Latino Audi Team	L	L	X	X	X	0
Team New Zealand	W (00:12)	W	X	X	X	2

Due to light wind the Final series was reduced to a best of three series.

2010 Louis Vuitton Trophy Auckland
Team New Zealand
First Title

== Broadcasting ==
=== Television ===
Large TV screens were set up in the Viaduct Harbour for spectators to watch. Coverage was also streamed online.

TVNZ featured the early round robin results in there One News sports coverage, as did TV3's 3 News. From the elimination stage TV One had a nightly half-hour report and the two final days featured live broadcasts on TV One.

=== Radio ===
The event was broadcast on a special radio station set up for the event, LiveSport Sailing 103.0 FM.

== Junior Series ==
A Junior series for under-15's was again run at the same time as the main regatta. The competition used O'pen BIC yachts around a short course in Auckland's Viaduct Harbour. The winner received the opportunity to be 18th man on one of the boats during the Cup Final races and an O'pen Bic yacht. The event was sponsored by the New Zealand Herald.

== Auckland Festival of Sail ==
The Louis Vuitton Trophy is part of an "Auckland Festival of Sail", as the event was preceded by the Omega Auckland match-race regatta and followed by the BMW World Sailing Cup final. The Auckland International Boat Show also took place from the 11–14 March.

A one-day superyacht regatta was also planned to be held alongside the Louis Vuitton event.

The New Zealand Government committed NZ$1.5 million to help fund the Festival and the Auckland City Council contributed $650,000.

=== Match Racing Regatta ===
The Auckland Match Racing Regatta was held from the 3 March until the 6 March and included ten well known skippers. The teams of five sailed in identical Bruce Farr designed MRX's. The regatta was won by Dean Barker who defeated Ben Ainslie in the final. The winning crew consisted of Barker, Ray Davies, Jeremy Lomas, Don Cowie, James Dagg and Tony Rae.

Skipper	Pts
Ben Ainslie (GBR)	8
Torvar Mirsky (AUS)	5
Adam Minoprio (NZL)	5
Dean Barker (NZL)	5
Karol Jablonski (POL)	5
Bertrand Pace (FRA)	4
Magnus Holmberg (SWE)	3.5
Francesco Bruni (ITA)	3.5
Chris Dickson (NZL)	3
Sébastian Col (FRA)	3

Semifinals
1	Ben Ainslie	2
4	Torvar Mirsky	0
3	Adam Minoprio	0
2	Dean Barker	2

Finals
Ben Ainslie	0
Dean Barker	2
Third place
Torvar Mirsky	0
Adam Minoprio	2

=== BMW Sailing Cup world final ===
The BMW Sailing Cup world final was held from the 22 March until the 25 March and included seven amateur national teams sailing in Farr MRX's. The regatta was won by New Zealand, who became the first country to win back to back titles.

Rank	Team
1	New Zealand
2	Portugal
3	Italy
4	Malta
5	Spain
6	Hong Kong
7	Germany

Semifinals
1	New Zealand	2
4	Malta	0
3	Italy	0
2	Portugal	2

Finals
New Zealand	3
Portugal	0
Third place
Malta	0
Italy	2

Preceded by Nice	Second Louis Vuitton Trophy Regatta; March 2010	Succeeded by La Maddalena
Preceded by 2009	Second Louis Vuitton Auckland Regatta; March 2010	Succeeded by To be Confirmed
