= Louis Vuitton Trophy Dubai =

Scheduled regatta that competes for the Louis Vuitton Trophy

Date	14–27 November 2010
Winner	Team New Zealand
Location	Dubai, United Arab Emirates

The Louis Vuitton Trophy Dubai was the fourth in a scheduled series of regattas that compete for the Louis Vuitton Trophy. The regatta occurred in Dubai between 14–27 November 2010. The Louis Vuitton Trophy format uses existing International America's Cup Class yachts loaned to the regatta by various America's Cup racing syndicates, keeping costs relatively low for the competing teams.

The Louis Vuitton Trophy was organised after the success of the Louis Vuitton Pacific Series and the continued legal battle surrounding the America's Cup yachting competition at the time. Because of the long delays from the legal action, and the fact that the 2010 America's Cup became a Deed of Gift match without a defender or challenger selection series, the Louis Vuitton Trophy series was established as a competition for other America's Cup racing syndicates.

The Dubai event was hosted by Dubai International Marine Club and sponsored by the airline Emirates.

== The Yachts ==
The event used four International America's Cup Class yachts loaned specifically for the event. For Dubai, the boats were supplied by Team New Zealand (NZL-84 & NZL-92) and BMW Oracle Racing (USA-87 & USA-98).

== Teams ==
Six teams participated in the Dubai event, down from the eight teams that appeared in the earlier Nice Côte d’Azur and Auckland Louis Vuitton Trophy regattas, and the ten teams that competed in La Maddalena.

Ranking	Country	Team	Club	Skipper
1	New Zealand	Team New Zealand	Royal New Zealand Yacht Squadron	
2	United States	BMW Oracle Racing	Golden Gate Yacht Club	
3	Italy	Mascalzone Latino	Club Nautico di Roma	
4	France/Germany	ALL4ONE Challenge	Cercle de la Voile de Paris/Kieler Yacht-Club	
5	Russia	Synergy Russian Sailing Team		
6	Sweden	Team Artemis	Royal Swedish Yacht Club	

== The Races ==
=== Round Robin 1 ===
14-18 November
Each team sailed each other team twice. One point was awarded for a win.

Team Name	Races	W	L	Pts
(United States) BMW Oracle Racing	10	9	1	9
(Sweden) Team Artemis	10	5	5	5
Team New Zealand	10	5	5	4.5*
(Russia) Synergy Russian Sailing	10	4	6	4
(France) (Germany) ALL4ONE Challenge	10	4	7	4
(Italy) Mascalzone Latino	10	3	7	2*

	A4O	ART	BOR	TNZ	MAS	SYN	Points
A4O		1	0	0	2	1	4
ART	1		0	2	1	1	5
BOR	2	2		1	2	2	9
TNZ	2	0	1		1*	1	4.5*
MAS	0	1	0	1*		1	2*
SYN	1	1	0	1	1		4

* = Point(s) deducted by umpires, A = Abandoned, P = Postponed, R = Retired

=== Round Robin 2 ===
21-23 November
Each team sailed each other team once. Two points were awarded for a win.

Team Name	Races	W	L	RR1	Pts
(United States) BMW Oracle Racing	5	4	1	9	17
Team New Zealand	5	4	1	4.5*	12.5*
(Italy) Mascalzone Latino	5	3	2	2*	8*
(France) (Germany) ALL4ONE Challenge	5	2	3	4	8
(Russia) Synergy Russian Sailing	5	2	3	4	6*
(Sweden) Team Artemis	5	0	5	5	5

	A4O	ART	BOR	TNZ	MAS	SYN	Points
A4O		2	2	0	0	0	4
ART	0		0	0	0	0	0
BOR	0	2		2	2	2	8
TNZ	2	2	0		2	2	8
MAS	2	2	0	0		2	6
SYN	2	2*	0	0	0		2*

* = Point(s) deducted by umpires, A = Abandoned, P = Postponed, R = Retired

=== Finals ===
26-27 November
Two best of three semi finals will be followed by a best of five final. The winner of the round robins will pick there semi final opponent from the top four teams.

Semifinals
1	(United States) BMW Oracle Racing	2
4	(France) (Germany) ALL4ONE Challenge	0
2	Team New Zealand	2
3	(Italy) Mascalzone Latino	0

Finals
Team New Zealand	2
(United States) BMW Oracle Racing	0

=== Fleet Races ===
25 November
Up to three fleet races will be held, with each team sailing in up to two races. These will be a separate event from the match racing Trophy.

== Sea Dubai Watersports Festival ==
The event will mark the start of the Sea Dubai Watersports Festival under the patronage of Mohammed bin Rashid Al Maktoum. This festival also includes the Dubai Shamaal World Surf Ski Championship, the Oakley Riot World Wakeboard Tournament, the UAE National Day Watersports Parade, the Mina Mile Swimming Competition, an Open Water Swim and Jet Ski Competition, the Traditional 43 ft Dhow Sailing Championship and finishes on 11 December with the final round of the Powerboat World Championships.

Preceded by La Maddalena	Fourth Louis Vuitton Trophy Regatta; 13–28 November 2010	Succeeded by Hong Kong
