= Louis Vuitton Trophy =

Series of four match race regattas in International America's Cup Class boats

- Sport: Sailing
- Founded: 2009
- No. of teams: 10
- Country: NZL, United States, FRA, SWE, ITA, GBR, RUS
- Related competitions: America's Cup, Louis Vuitton Cup, Louis Vuitton Pacific Series

The Louis Vuitton Trophy was a series of four match race regattas in International America's Cup Class boats, held between November 2009 and November 2010.

The Louis Vuitton Trophy was organised after the success of the Louis Vuitton Pacific Series in Auckland and the continued legal battle surrounding the America's Cup yachting competition at the time. Because of the long delays from the legal action, and the fact that the 33rd America's Cup became a Deed of Gift match without a defender or challenger selection series, the Louis Vuitton Trophy series was established as a competition for other America's Cup racing syndicates.

Each of the four Trophy regattas featured between eight and ten teams in a round robin, with two teams advancing to a final to determine that regatta's Trophy winner. Five syndicates lent their own International America's Cup Class boats for shared use in the regattas, making participation more affordable for the teams.

Supported by Louis Vuitton, the World Sailing Team Association and a group of ten America's Cup syndicates from seven countries, these relatively low cost events running on loaned boats kept syndicates active while waiting for the 8th Louis Vuitton Cup to determine the challenger for the 34th America's Cup.

== Name ==
The series was originally launched as the Louis Vuitton World Series but after a request from the International Sailing Federation (ISAF) the name was changed to the Louis Vuitton Trophy.

== Teams ==
Country	Team	Club	Skipper	Notes
New Zealand	Team New Zealand	Royal New Zealand Yacht Squadron	Dean Barker	Host (Auckland)
United States	BMW Oracle Racing	Golden Gate Yacht Club	James Spithill, Gavin Brady, Hamish Pepper	Crew in Nice was separate from the one participating in the 2010 America's Cup. Did not send a team to Auckland.
Sweden	Team Artemis	Royal Swedish Yacht Club	Paul Cayard	
France/Germany	ALL4ONE	Cercle de la Voile de Paris / Kieler Yacht-Club	Sébastien Col, Jochen Schümann	Host (Nice). ALL4ONE uses FRA as flag state on boat it lent to this event.
France	Team French Spirit		Bertrand Pacé	
Russia	Team Synergy		Karol Jabłoński	
Italy	Mascalzone Latino	Reale Yacht Club Canottieri Savoia / Club Nautico di Roma	Gavin Brady	Host (La Maddalena). Did not compete in Nice.
Italy	Azzurra	Yacht Club Costa Smeralda	Francesco Bruni, Tommaso Chieffi	
United Kingdom	Team Origin	Royal Thames Yacht Club	Ben Ainslie	
Italy	Luna Rossa	Yacht Club Italiano	Ed Baird	Did not compete in Nice or Auckland.

== Venues ==

A trophy was awarded to the winner at each of the four events, held in four countries between November 2009 and November 2010.

A fifth event was scheduled for January, 2011. San Diego submitted a bid for a sixth, March 2011 event, while various cities/countries (Russia, Greece, Newport, Valencia, Cape Town and Abu Dhabi) expressed an interest in bidding for future Trophy regattas.

The fifth event in the Louis Vuitton Trophy series – and all future Trophy plans – were set aside when the plans for the 34th America's Cup were announced.

Dates	Regatta	Winner	Runner up
7–22 November 2009	(France) Louis Vuitton Trophy Nice Côte d’Azur	(Italy) Azzurra	Team New Zealand
9–21 March 2010	(New Zealand) Louis Vuitton Trophy Auckland	Team New Zealand	(Italy) Mascalzone Latino
22 May - 6 June 2010	(Italy) Louis Vuitton Trophy La Maddalena	Team New Zealand	(Russia) Team Synergy
13–28 November 2010	(United Arab Emirates) Louis Vuitton Trophy Middle East	Team New Zealand	(United States) BMW Oracle Racing
9–24 January 2011	Louis Vuitton Trophy Hong Kong	N/A	N/A

== Yachts ==
All events used International America's Cup Class yachts, lent to the regatta by various syndicates.

Regatta	Shared Yachts
(France) Louis Vuitton Trophy Nice Côte d’Azur	Mascalzone Latino's ITA-90 & ITA-99, All4One's FRA-93, Team Origin's GBR-75
(New Zealand) Louis Vuitton Trophy Auckland	Team New Zealand's NZL-84 & NZL-92, BMW Oracle Racing's USA-87 was a safety backup but was not required.
(Italy) Louis Vuitton Trophy La Maddalena	Mascalzone Latino's ITA-90 & ITA-99, BMW Oracle Racing's USA-87 & USA-98
(United Arab Emirates) Louis Vuitton Trophy Middle East	Team New Zealand's NZL-84 & NZL-92, BMW Oracle Racing's USA-87 & USA-98.

== See also ==
- Louis Vuitton Cup
- Louis Vuitton Pacific Series
