= Louis Vuitton Trophy, Nice, Côte d'Azur =

Regatta that compete for the Louis Vuitton Trophy

Louis Vuitton Trophy Nice Côte d’Azur
Date	7–22 November 2009
Winner	(Italy) Azzurra
Location	Nice

The Louis Vuitton Trophy Nice Côte d’Azur was the first in a series of regattas that compete for the Louis Vuitton Trophy. The regatta was held in Nice between 7 and 22 November 2009. The Louis Vuitton Trophy format uses existing International America's Cup Class yachts loaned to the regatta by various America's Cup racing syndicates, keeping costs relatively low for the competing teams.

The Louis Vuitton Trophy was organised after the success of the Louis Vuitton Pacific Series and the continued legal battle surrounding the America's Cup yachting competition at the time. Because of the long delays from the legal action, and the fact that the 2010 America's Cup became a Deed of Gift match without a defender or challenger selection series, the Louis Vuitton Trophy series was established as a competition for other America's Cup racing syndicates.

The Nice event was hosted by ALL4ONE Challenge and Club Nautique de Nice.

== The Yachts ==
For the event Mascalzone Latino provided ITA-90 and ITA-99 while All4One and Team Origin loaned FRA-93 and GBR-75 respectively.

== Teams ==
Eight teams participated in the Nice event. Despite loaning two boats to the event, Mascalzone Latino did not participate.

Ranking	Country	Team	Club	Skipper	Notes
1	Italy	Azzurra	Yacht Club Costa Smeralda	Francesco Bruni, Tommaso Chieffi	
2	New Zealand	Team New Zealand	Royal New Zealand Yacht Squadron	Dean Barker	
3	Russia	Synergy Russian Sailing Team		Karol Jabłoński	
4	United Kingdom	Team Origin	Royal Thames Yacht Club	Ben Ainslie	
5	France/Germany	ALL4ONE Challenge	Cercle de la Voile de Paris/Kieler Yacht-Club	Sébastien Col, Jochen Schümann	Host
6	United States	BMW Oracle Racing	Golden Gate Yacht Club	Gavin Brady, Hamish Pepper	
7	Sweden	Team Artemis	Royal Swedish Yacht Club	Paul Cayard	
8	France	TFS - Pages Jaunes		Bertrand Pacé	

== The Races ==
=== Round Robin One ===
7 November - 14 November
Up to four flights per day were scheduled through the conclusion of the round robin and lasted no longer than one hour in duration. The first three days were characterised by light winds and only two races were completed each day. However, on day four the race organisers completed four full flights (eight races) to get the regatta back on schedule.

Team Name	Races	W	L
Team New Zealand	7	6	1
(Italy) Azzurra	7	6	1
(United Kingdom) Team Origin	7	5	1
(Sweden) Team Artemis	7	3	4
(Russia) Synergy Russian Sailing	7	3	4
(United States) BMW Oracle Racing	7	3	4
(France) (Germany) ALL4ONE Challenge	7	2	5
(France) TFS - Pages Jaunes	7	0	7

	TNZ	BOR	ART	A4O	TFS	SYN	AZZ	ORG	Total
TNZ		1	1	1	1	1	1	0	6
BOR	0		1	1	1	0	0	0	3
ART	0	0		0	1	1	0	1	3
A4O	R	0	1		1	0	0	0	2
TFS	0	0	0	0		0	0	0	0
SYN	0	1	0	1	1		0	0	3
AZZ	0	1	1	1	1	1		1	6
ORG	1	1	0	1	1	1	0		5

A = Abandoned, P = Postponed, R = Retired

=== Round Robin Two ===
14 November-18 November
Stage 2 was a half round robin where the top four teams raced the bottom four teams. As the half round robin was not completed, teams received half points for matches sailed twice.

Team Name	Races	W	L	RR1	Total	Points
Team New Zealand	3	3	0	6	9	6
(Russia) Synergy Russian Sailing	3	3	0	3	6	4.5
(Italy) Azzurra	4	1	3	6	7	4.5
(United Kingdom) Team Origin	4	3	1	5	8	4.5
(United States) BMW Oracle Racing	4	1	3	3	4	3
(Sweden) Team Artemis	4	2	2	3	5	3
(France) (Germany) ALL4ONE Challenge	4	1	3	2	3	2
(France) TFS - Pages Jaunes	4	1	3	0	1	0.5

	SYN	BOR	A4O	TFS	Total
TNZ	1	1	1	A	3
AZZ	0	1	0	0	1
ORG	0	1	1	1	3
ART	0	0	1	1	2

	TNZ	AZZ	ORG	ART	Total
SYN	A	1	1	1	3
BOR	0	0	0	1	1
A4O	0	1	0	0	1
TFS	0	1	0	0	1

A = Abandoned, P = Postponed, R = Retired

=== Knock-Out Series ===
19 November-22 November
Stage 3 is the knockout semifinals and final.

==== Ranking Phase ====
Teams in the bottom half of the Round Robin will sail off for places 5-8.

Semifinals
1	BMW Oracle Racing	1
4	TFS - Pages Jaunes	0
3	Team Artemis	0
2	ALL4ONE Challenge	1

Finals
BMW Oracle Racing	0
ALL4ONE Challenge	1
Third place
TFS - Pages Jaunes	0
Team Artemis	1

==== Finals ====
As Team New Zealand won the Round Robin, they got to choose their Semi Final opponents from the top four. The first to score two wins will win each series.

Semifinals
1	Team New Zealand	1*
4	Synergy	0*
3	Azzurra	2
2	Team Origin	1

Finals
Team New Zealand	0
Azzurra	2
Third place
Synergy	1
Team Origin	0

*Team New Zealand were penalised a point and Synergy was penalised half a point for failing to avoid a collision. Synergy were then further penalised half a point for not doing everything to keep clear in the same incident.

2009 Louis Vuitton Trophy Nice
Azzurra
First Title

== Junior Series ==
During the regatta forty junior French sailors competed in Open Bic boats. The winner received an Open Bic boat and a chance to be 18th man during the Trophy finals.

Preceded by Inaugural Event	First Louis Vuitton Trophy Regatta; 7–22 November 2009	Succeeded by Auckland
