= 2003 Louis Vuitton Cup =

Sailing event

5th Louis Vuitton Cup
Event information
- Type: Challenge race for America's Cup
- Dates: 1 October 2002 – 19 January 2003
- Boats: Alinghi (Switzerland); GBR Challenge (United Kingdom); Le Defi Areva (France); Mascalzone Latino (Italy); OneWorld (United States); Oracle BMW Racing (United States); Prada Challenge (Italy); Team Dennis Conner (United States); Victory Challenge (Sweden)

Results
- Winner: Alinghi (Switzerland)

Succession
- Previous: 1995 Louis Vuitton Cup
- Next: 2007 Louis Vuitton Cup

The 6th Louis Vuitton Cup was held in Auckland, New Zealand, in 2003. The winner, Alinghi, went on to challenge for and win the 2003 America's Cup.

== Teams ==
The Yacht Club Punta Ala was the challenger of record.

Club	Team	Skipper	Yachts
(Switzerland) Société Nautique de Genève	Alinghi	(New Zealand) Russell Coutts	SUI-64
(United Kingdom) Royal Ocean Racing Club	GBR Challenge	(United Kingdom) Ian Walker	GBR-70
(France) Union Nationale Pour La Course au Large	Le Defi Areva	(France) Luc Pillot	FRA-69
(Italy) Reale Yacht Club Canottieri Savoia	Mascalzone Latino	(Italy) Vincenzo Onorato	ITA-72
(United States) Seattle Yacht Club	OneWorld	(Australia) Peter Gilmour	USA-65 & USA-67
(United States) Golden Gate Yacht Club	Oracle BMW Racing	(United States) Peter Holmberg (New Zealand) Chris Dickson	USA-76
(Italy) Yacht Club Punta Ala	Prada Challenge	(Italy) Francesco de Angelis	ITA-74
(United States) New York Yacht Club	Team Dennis Conner	(United States) Dennis Conner	USA-66 & USA-77
(Sweden) Gamla Stans Yacht Sallskap	Victory Challenge	(Sweden) Mats Johansson	SWE-63 & SWE-73

=== Alinghi ===
Founded by Swiss businessman Ernesto Bertarelli, Alinghi featured Russell Coutts and Brad Butterworth who had both joined from Team New Zealand. Jochen Schümann was also involved in the team.

=== GBR Challenge ===
Put together by Peter Harrison and New Zealander David Barnes, the team was skippered by Ian Walker and included Jim Turner. GBR 70 was known as Wight Lightning while GBR 78 was called Wight Magic.

=== Le Defi Areva ===
Despite 2000 skipper Bertrand Pacé joining Team New Zealand, Le Defi returned in 2003 with Luc Pillot skippering FRA 79.

=== Mascalzone Latino ===
Headed by shipping magnate Vincenzo Onorato, Mascalzone Latino featured an all-Italian crew. The syndicate was only established in 2001 and Paolo Cian served as helmsman and the crew included Flavio Favini, Shannon Falcone, Giuseppe Brizzi, Davide Scarpa, and Pierluigi De Felice. and Francesco De vita

=== OneWorld ===
Part-financed by Microsoft mogul Paul Allen, OneWorld was based in Seattle. Skippered by Peter Gilmour, the team was docked one Louis Vuitton point by an arbitration panel for being in possession of design secrets from another team.

The design team included Laurie Davidson, Bruce Nelson and Phil Kaiko and the sailing team included 10 Olympic medallists, three round-the-world winners, 60 world championship titles in various classes, and 16 America's Cup winners.

The crew included Kevin Shoebridge as a trimmer, Mark Mendelblatt as backup helmsman, Kevin Hall, Rick Dodson, David Endean, Grant Spanhake, Peter Waymouth, Matt Mason, Joey Newton, James Spithill, Jeremy Scantlebury, Alan Smith, Andy Fethers, Andrew Taylor, Scott Crawford, and Olympians Craig Monk, Don Cowie, Ben Ainslie, Kelvin Harrap, Charles and Jonathan McKee.

=== Oracle BMW Racing ===
Founded by Larry Ellison who bought the assets of 2000 syndicate AmericaOne. The team was skippered by Peter Holmberg and also featured Paul Cayard, Matt Welling, Bob Wylie, John Cutler, Phil Jameson, Brad Webb, Brian MacInnes, Cameron Dunn, and Chris Dickson. USA 71 and USA 76 were designed by Bruce Farr.

Roy Heiner sailed the trial boat.

=== Prada Challenge ===
Founded by Patrizio Bertelli, Prada's crew included members of the 2000 Young America syndicate. They were again skippered by Francesco de Angelis and Rod Davis, Pietro D'Alì, Thomas Burnham, Hartwell Jordan, Piero Romeo, Gavin Brady, Francesco Bruni, Andrew Hemmings, Steven Erickson, Matteo Plazzi, Gilberto Nobili, Massimo Gherarducci, Alberto Barovier, and Torben Grael were in the crew.

=== Team Dennis Conner ===
Team Dennis Conner's USA 77 suffered a massive blow when it sank off the Californian coast in July before the Cup began. The helmsman was Ken Read and the team included Terry Hutchinson.

=== Victory Challenge ===
Principal backer Jan Stenbeck died of a heart attack in August 2002. This was Sweden's first America's Cup bid since 1992 and the crew included Magnus Holmberg, Lars Linger, Stefan Rahm, Mikkel Røssberg, Jesper Bank, Mats Johansson, Roger Hall and Olympian Magnus Augustson.

Their boats were designed by Germán Frers and Cole (Skip) Lissiman was their coach.

== Round robin ==
Team name	Races	Won	RR1 Pts.	RR2 Pts.	Total Pts.	Ranking
(Switzerland) Alinghi	16	13	7	6	13	1
(United States) BMWOracle	16	12	5	7	12	2
(United States) OneWorld	16	13	8	5	12*	3
(Italy) Prada Challenge	16	11	4	7	11	4
(Sweden) Victory Challenge	16	7	3	4	7	5
(United Kingdom) GBR Challenge	16	7	4	3	7	6
(United States) Stars & Stripes	16	6	5	1	6	7
(France) Le Defi Areva	16	2	1	1	2	8
(Italy) Mascalzone Latino	16	1	0	1	1	9

* OneWorld was docked one race win.

== Finals ==
=== Quarter-finals ===
Quarter-finals
4	(Italy) Prada Challenge	0
1	(Switzerland) Alinghi	4
5	(Sweden) Victory Challenge	4
8	(France) Le Defi Areva	1

Repechage
(Italy) Prada Challenge	4
(Sweden) Victory Challenge	0

Quarter-finals
7	(United States) Stars & Stripes	4
6	(United Kingdom) GBR Challenge	1
3	(United States) OneWorld	0
2	(United States) BMW Oracle	4

Repechage
(United States) Stars & Stripes	0
(United States) OneWorld	4

=== Finals ===
Semi-finals
(United States) BMW Oracle	0
(Switzerland) Alinghi	4
(United States) OneWorld	4
(Italy) Prada Challenge	2

Repechage
(United States) BMW Oracle	4
(United States) OneWorld	0

Final
(Switzerland) Alinghi	5
(United States) BMW Oracle	1
