= Gavin Brady =

New Zealand sailor (born 1973)

Gavin Brady (born 1 November 1973 in Timaru) is a New Zealand sailor who has competed in the Summer Olympics and multiple America's Cups.

After sailing the sponsor boat for New Zealand Challenge at the 1992 Louis Vuitton Cup, Brady was the tactician for Tag Heuer Challenge at the 1995 Louis Vuitton Cup. He then sailed the 1997–98 Whitbread Round the World Race as the helmsman on Chessie Racing.

Brady was third at the 1999 ISAF Open Match Racing World Championship. He then joined AmericaOne for the 2000 Louis Vuitton Cup. In 1999 he was helming inshore races in the winning Dutch |Champagne Mumm Admiral's Cup Team.

Alongside Jamie Gale, Brady competed at the 2000 Star World Championships and finished 7th. Gale and Brady then sailed for New Zealand at the 2000 Summer Olympics. They placed ninth in the Star class. He competed in the 2001 Star World Championships with George Iverson and the pair finished second. He then competed in his second Round the World Race, sailing on Team SEB during the 2001–02 Volvo Ocean Race.

Brady sailed for Luna Rossa Challenge at the 2003 Louis Vuitton Cup. Brady was the tactician for Oracle Racing at the 2007 Louis Vuitton Cup. In 2009 he sailed for the Greek Challenge at the Louis Vuitton Pacific Series before returning to Oracle for the Louis Vuitton Trophy Nice Côte d’Azur. In 2010 he sailed in the Louis Vuitton Trophy Auckland and Louis Vuitton Trophy La Maddalena for Mascalzone Latino.

He is also a four-time winner of the Congressional Cup.
