= Jamie Gale =

New Zealand sailor

Jamie Gale (born 25 November 1971) is a New Zealand sailor who has sailed in two Summer Olympics, the Volvo Ocean Race and multiple America's Cups.

== Sailing career ==
Gale has been involved in New Zealand Challenge during the 1992 Louis Vuitton Cup and was a sailing team member of Team New Zealand when they won the 1995 Louis Vuitton Cup and 1995 America's Cup.

He represented New Zealand at the 1996 Summer Olympics, sailing with Kelvin Harrap and Sean Clarkson in a Soling. They finished 14th in the competition.

He sailed for Young America at the 2000 Louis Vuitton Cup.

Alongside Gavin Brady, Gale competed at the 2000 Star World Championships and finished 7th. Gale and Brady then sailed for New Zealand at the 2000 Summer Olympics. They placed ninth in the Star class.

He was the mastman on board Illbruck Challenge when it won the 2001–02 Volvo Ocean Race.

He joined Oracle Racing for the 2007 Louis Vuitton Cup, where he was their mastman. In 2010, he spent time with Mascalzone Latino.
