= Louis Vuitton Trophy Hong Kong =

Scheduled regatta that forms the Louis Vuitton Trophy

| Date | 9–24 January 2011 |
| Winner | Called off |
| Location | Hong Kong |

The Louis Vuitton Trophy Hong Kong was going to be the fifth in a scheduled series of regattas that formed the Louis Vuitton Trophy. The regatta was planned for Hong Kong between 9–24 January 2011. However the regatta was called off as most teams began focussing on the 34th America's Cup.

The Louis Vuitton Trophy series was formed after the legal battles around the 2010 America's Cup and the success of the Louis Vuitton Pacific Series in Auckland in 2009. The Hong Kong event was to be hosted by the Royal Hong Kong Yacht Club.
