= Keith Mills =

English entrepreneur (born 1950)

Sir Keith Mills GBE DL
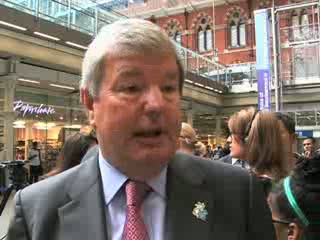
- Mills in July 2010
- Born: May 1950 (age 76); Brentwood, Essex, England
- Education: St Martin's School, Brentwood
- Occupation: Businessman

Sir Keith Edward Mills (born 15 May 1950) is an English entrepreneur and was deputy chairman of the London Organising Committee of the Olympic and Paralympic Games.

== Early life ==
Mills was born in Brentwood. He attended St Martin's School, Brentwood on Hanging Hill Lane in Hutton, Brentwood.

== Career ==
Mills worked for over twenty years in marketing and advertising. Having left school with no qualifications, he started with The Economist at the age of fifteen as a copy assistant and then at the Financial Times and Investors Chronicle, where he was responsible for their marketing programmes. From there, he moved into advertising in London. In 1981, he led a management buyout of the London office of the New York-based company Nadler & Larimer, becoming the chief executive. In 1985, he co-founded Mills, Smith & Partners.

He was also a non-executive director at Tottenham Hotspur Football Club but stepped down in January 2016.

In 2011, Mills was awarded an Honorary Degree (Doctor of Laws) from the University of Bath. He received an Honorary Degree from the University of Essex in 2013.

== Loyalty cards ==
Mills is chiefly known for inventing the Air Miles (in 1988) and Nectar Card (in 2002) loyalty card schemes. Similar "frequent flyer" schemes had been launched in the US in May 1981 by American Airlines and United Airlines.

=== Air Miles ===
Air Miles was set up in 1988 when Mills started the Loyalty Management Group, then known as Air Miles International Group BV. He had the idea in 1987 when working at his advertising agency, which had Shell and British Caledonian as clients who were looking to make the most of their customer base without devaluing the image of the products. People would buy Air Miles from Shell petrol to use on British Caledonian. He approached British Airways and they liked the idea. He subsequently marketed comparable concepts in the United States and Canada, relocating to the United States in 1990. The US Air Miles system failed in 1993, resulting in a loss of £15 million for him. In 1994, he sold his 49% stake in the program to British Airways, but he continues to hold the intellectual property rights.

=== Nectar Card ===
Loyalty Management UK was started in 2001, which produced the Nectar Card in September, 2002. In December 2007, the company was sold for £350m to the Canadian company Aeroplan, in which he had 46% of sharehold, netting £160m.

== Olympics ==
From September 2003, he became chief executive and international president of the London 2012 campaign, which saw London selected as host for the 2012 Summer Olympics. He served as deputy chairman of the London Organising Committee for the Olympic Games. At the end of the project, Mills was awarded the Olympic Order. He later set up the charity Sported with £10 million of his own money to deliver on London 2012's legacy promises.

== Invictus Games ==
In November 2013, Prince Harry contacted Mills to assist with the creation of his vision of an international-style Warrior Games event for sick and injured active duty and veteran service members. Harry felt Mills's organizational skills, social and political connections, as well as his involvement as an entrepreneur and deputy chairman of the London Organizational Committee of the Olympic and Paralympic Games were perfect for the project. The result was helping Harry to found what is now the Invictus Games. This International sporting event takes place every two years to help the recovery of sick and injured active duty and veteran service members from 23 participating countries. Mills went on to be the Chair of the Invictus Games Foundation Board of Trustees for six years, stepping down with the appointment of Lord Charles Allen in 2021.

== National Lottery ==
In 2020, SAZKA Group, Europe’s largest lottery operator, announced it had appointed Sir Keith Mills as Bid Chair of the UK team for the Fourth National Lottery Licence Competition. In March 2022, following a "fair, open and robust competition", the Gambling Commission named Allwyn as their preferred applicant. In January 2023, Allwyn received approval from the Gambling Commission to acquire Camelot UK Lotteries Ltd. Subsequently, in February 2023, upon the completion of the transaction, Sir Keith was named the Chairman of Camelot UK Lotteries Ltd.

== Coutts AIG action ==
The same month that Loyalty Management UK was sold, Mills bought £73m of the "enhanced fund" version of AIG Life "premier bonds" on the advice of Coutts, the private bank owned by Royal Bank of Scotland. Coutts recommended to Mills that he place his money in AIG Life Premier Bonds as a way of protecting his capital. They also said it would be a safe alternative to bank deposits and would earn a slightly better interest rate. Coutts said Mills' money would be safe, as AIG was the largest insurance company in the world, AA rated, and that the bonds would provide instant access to his money, just like a deposit account. Later, in light of unfavorable media coverage regarding AIG's prospects, Mills sought clarification from Coutts in writing about the security of his investments with AIG. In response, Coutts indicated their lack of worry about these bonds, leading Mills to hold onto them. AIG Life, a UK branch of the American International Group, a US insurance company, received a bailout from the US Federal Reserve on September 16, 2008.

== Personal life ==
He married Maureen in 1974; they have two children and live near Tunbridge Wells in Kent. Lady Mills supports her husband's charity work and support for sports, including the successful bid for the London 2012 Olympic and Paralympic games.

He enjoys sailing. In 1999, he was member of a team captained by Alex Thomson that won the Clipper Round the World Yacht Race, and in 2002, he skippered his Oyster 485 yacht in the Atlantic Rally for Cruisers. He founded Team Origin in 2007, and is a member of the Royal Thames Yacht Club.

== Honours ==
Mills was knighted in the 2006 New Years Honours List in recognition of his services to sport. He was appointed Knight Grand Cross of the Order of the British Empire (GBE) in the 2013 New Years Honours List for services to the London 2012 Olympic and Paralympic Games. He was appointed a deputy lieutenant for the County of Kent in September 2008. This gave him the Post Nominal Letters "DL" for Life.

The University of Bath awarded Mills an Honorary Doctorate of Laws in 2011.
