= Louis Vuitton Pacific Series =

Match race regatta in America's Cup Class yachts in Auckland

- Sport: Sailing
- Founded: 2008
- No. of teams: 10
- Country: NZL, USA, FRA, RSA, ITA, GBR, CHN, GRE, SUI
- Related competitions: America's Cup, Louis Vuitton Cup

The Louis Vuitton Pacific Series was a match race regatta in America's Cup Class yachts in Auckland, New Zealand, during January and February 2009. Racing started on 30 January. The Louis Vuitton Pacific Series was organised in association with the New Zealand Government, Emirates Team New Zealand, the Royal New Zealand Yacht Squadron, Auckland City and Skycity Entertainment Group. Bruno Troublé was Louis Vuitton's organizer and spokesperson for the Series.

The creation of the event was in response to the legal battle surrounding the America's Cup yachting competition at the time. Because of the long delays from the legal action, and the fact that the 33rd America's Cup became a Deed of Gift match without a defender or challenger selection series, the Louis Vuitton Pacific Series was established as a competition for other America's Cup racing syndicates.

Ten syndicates took part in the regatta, which used four International America's Cup Class boats loaned to the regatta by Team New Zealand and BMW Oracle Racing. This made participation more affordable for the teams.

Described by its creators as a "fun and friendly event", the Louis Vuitton Pacific Series relied on the concept of loaned boats and quick and short races with an abbreviated schedule to pack 53 match races into a three-week period. Racing was held every day except on one scheduled lay day.

Team New Zealand won the Louis Vuitton Pacific Trophy, beating the Swiss Alinghi team 3–1 in the Cup Final.

In September 2009, this initial event was expanded into the four Louis Vuitton Trophy regattas, held between November 2009 and November 2010. These events continued to be relatively low cost, using a small number of loaned boats to keep syndicates active while waiting for the 8th Louis Vuitton Cup to determine the challenger for the 34th America's Cup.

== Course/Schedule ==
Up to six match races were held each day on a short windward-leeward course laid at the entrance to Auckland's Waitematā Harbour, between Rangitoto Island and the city foreshore. Four different courses were used depending on weather patterns.

Emirates Team New Zealand, as hosts, earned direct entry into the Louis Vuitton final. However, the team was also allocated to a pool and raced in the preliminary qualifying rounds. Points won by Team New Zealand in pool play were disregarded when the rankings were determined after the qualifying rounds.

The 10 teams were divided into two qualifying groups of five, with the top three teams in each pool proceeding to the Gold Fleet and the remaining two teams proceeding to the Silver Fleet. The winner of the Gold Fleet earned direct entry into the Challenger's Final, with the remaining teams in the Gold Fleet, and the two winners of the Silver Fleet, proceeding to the Third Round. The winner of the Third Round then met the winner of the Gold Fleet in the Challenger's Final; the winner of which proceeded to the final to race against Emirates Team New Zealand.

The winner of final was presented with the Louis Vuitton Pacific Series trophy.

== The Yachts ==
Team New Zealand provided NZL-92 and NZL-84 for the event and BMW Oracle Racing shipped USA-87 and USA-98 from Valencia for the event. The boats arrived in Auckland in mid-December. All four boats were extensively redesigned and worked on by onshore crew before the event. The boats were simplified and as a result did not completely meet IACC standards. The changes were made to make the boats easier to operate and make the races as even as possible.

== Pools/Results ==
=== Pool A (USA 87 & 98) ===
30 January – 3 February

Team Name	Races	W	D	L	Pts
Team New Zealand	4	4	0	0	4
(United States) BMW Oracle Racing	4	3	0	1	3
(Italy) Damiani Italia Challenge	4	2	0	2	2
(France) Pataguas K-Challenge	4	1	0	3	1
China Team	4	0	0	4	0

	TNZ	PKC	BOR	DIC	CHT
TNZ		W (1:38)	W (0:28)	W (0:19)	W (0:59)
PKC	L		L	L	W (1:02)
BOR	L	W (0:54)		W (0:52)	W (1:28)
DIC	L	W (0:45)	L		W (1:18)
CHT	L	L	L	L	

Number in brackets is winning delta.

=== Pool B (NZL 84 & 92) ===
30 January – 3 February

Team Name	Races	W	D	L	Pts
(United Kingdom) Team Origin	4	4	0	0	4
(Switzerland) Alinghi	4	2	0	2	2
(Italy) Luna Rossa	4	2	0	2	2
(South Africa) Team Shosholoza	4	1	0	3	1
(Greece) Greek Challenge	4	1	0	3	0*

	ALI	TOR	GRC	TSH	LR
ALI		L	W (2:02)	L	W (0:50)
TOR	W (0:36)		W (0:58)	W (0:48)	W (1:11)
GRC	DSQ	L		W (0:56)	L
TSH	W (3:49)	L	L		L
LR	L	L	W (0:54)	W (1:09)	

Number in brackets is the winning delta.
*deducted a point for damaging the boats

=== Gold Fleet ===
5 – 9 February
The top three teams from each pool competed in the Gold Fleet. The winner advanced directly to the Challenger final. As host, Team New Zealand advanced directly to Cup Final. A team that wins a race against Team New Zealand does not gain a point. The seeding position determines where a team appears in the third round.

Seed	Team Name	Races	W	D	L	Pts
Host	Team New Zealand	5	2	0	3	n/a
1	(Switzerland) Alinghi	5	4	0	1	4
2	(United States) BMW Oracle Racing	5	4	0	1	2*
3	(Italy) Damiani Italia	5	3	0	2	2
4	(United Kingdom) Team Origin	5	2	0	3	0.5*
5	(Italy) Luna Rossa	5	0	0	5	0

	TNZ	BOR	DIC	TOR	ALI	LR
TNZ		L	L	L	W***	W (0:26)
BOR	W (0:27)		W (0:26)	W**	L	W (0:58)
DIC	W (0:19)	L		W (0:24)	L	W (1:40)
TOR	W (0:06)	RET**	L		L	W (0:04)
ALI	FOR***	W (0:27)	W (0:44)	W (0:15)		W (0:23)
LR	L	L	L	L	L	

*Both boats were deducted points for contact in the BMW Oracle vs Team Origin race: BMW Oracle −1, Team Origin −0.5
** Team Origin retired after failing to raise a headsail at second mark. The headsail foil was damaged from the earlier collision.
*** Team New Zealand completed the prestart without Alinghi after the Swiss boat forfeited the race. The race was then abandoned. Alinghi conceded because they saw no point in sailing the race when there were no points to be gained for them, while they risked losing points in the event of contact between the boats.

=== Silver Fleet ===
5 – 9 February
The remaining four teams competed in the Silver Fleet.

Seed	Team Name	Races	W	D	L	Pts
6	China Team	3	3	0	0	3
7	(France) Pataguas K-Challenge	3	2	0	1	2
8	(Greece) Greek Challenge	3	1	0	2	1
9	(South Africa) Team Shosholoza	3	0	0	3	0

	PKC	CHT	TSH	GRC
PKC		L	W (0:14)	W (0:27)
CHT	W (0:57)		W (0:15)	W (2:58)
TSH	L	L		L
GRC	L	L	W (1:26)	

=== Third round ===
10–11 February
The challengers ranked 2–7 sailed off with the winner advancing to the Challenger final. Seeds 8 and 9 also sailed off for a final ranking.

Sail Off
4	(United Kingdom) Team Origin	W(1:52)
7	(France) K-Challenge	L
5	(Italy) Luna Rossa	W(0:01)
6	China Team	L

Quarter Finals
3	(Italy) Damiani Italia	W(0:29)
(United Kingdom) Team Origin	L
(Italy) Luna Rossa	L
2	(United States) BMW Oracle	W(0:09)

Semi Final
(Italy) Damiani Italia	L
(United States) BMW Oracle	W(0:35)

Seed	Team Name	1
8	(Greece) Greek Challenge	W (0:31)
9	(South Africa) Team Shosholoza	L

=== Challenger Final ===
11–12 February
The winner of the Gold Fleet competed against the winner of the Third Round.

Seed	Team Name	1	2	3	4	5	T
1	(Switzerland) Alinghi	W (0:01)	W (1:07)	-	X	X	2
	(United States) BMW Oracle Racing	L	L	-	X	X	0

Due to poor weather the Challenger series was reduced to a best of three series.

=== Cup Final ===
13 – 14 February
As host, Team New Zealand qualified automatically for the Cup Final. They met the winner of the Challenger final in the Cup Final.

Team Name	1	2	3	4	5	6	7	T
Team New Zealand	L	W(0:28)	W(0:34)	W(0:19)	-	X	X	3
(Switzerland) Alinghi	W (0:12)	L	L	L	-	X	X	1

Due to poor weather the Final series was reduced to a best of five series.

2009 Louis Vuitton Pacific Series
Team New Zealand
First Title

== Confirmed Teams ==
Twelve teams were originally confirmed – however after two withdrawals the field contracted to ten teams. The teams arrived in Auckland on 23 January.

Country	Team	Club	Skipper	Notes
New Zealand	Team New Zealand	Royal New Zealand Yacht Squadron	Dean Barker	Host
United States	BMW Oracle Racing	Golden Gate Yacht Club	Russell Coutts	
France	K-Challenge	Cercle de la Voile de Paris	Sébastien Col	
South Africa	Team Shosholoza	Royal Cape Yacht Club	Paolo Cian	
Italy	Luna Rossa	Yacht Club Italiano	Peter Holmberg	
United Kingdom	Team Origin	Royal Thames Yacht Club	Ben Ainslie	
China	China Team	Qingdao International Yacht Club	Ian Williams	
Italy	Damiani Italia	Circolo Canottieri Aniene and Club Canottieri Roggero di Lauria	Vasco Vascotto	
Greece	Greek Challenge	Nautical Club of Kalamata	Sotiris Buseas	
Switzerland	Alinghi	Société Nautique de Genève	Brad Butterworth	America's Cup Defender

=== Withdrawn Teams ===
The following teams were scheduled to participate or were on the waiting list but did not take part in the event.

Country	Team	Notes
Italy	Italia Francesco De Angelis	Originally on Waiting List – Were contacted to see if they could make the event.
Italy	Mascalzone Latino	Withdrew due to financial concerns, due to the Great Recession.
Germany	Team Germany	Withdrew due to financial concerns after losing main sponsor Audi.
France	Team French Spirit Marc Pajot	Originally on Waiting List – Was unable to find the funds to participate.

== Broadcasting ==
=== Television ===
TVNZ carried live coverage on TVNZ Sport Extra on the Freeview platform. The coverage consisted of in-studio presenters and commentators, with the race coverage provided using Virtual Eye and a single live camera. The broadcast was also streamed live on. The broadcast was promoted as a world first, due to the event being broadcast predominantly with Virtual Eye animation.

A ONE Sport highlights package was also broadcast each night on TV ONE. A modified version of this highlights programme, as well as selected footage for news stories, was distributed nightly via satellite to international broadcasters by Dominique Curchod Communication.

=== Radio ===
The event was also broadcast in New Zealand on a special radio station, BSport Sailing 103.0 FM.

== Junior Series ==
A Junior series for under-16's was run at the same time as the senior series. Competitors were selected by Auckland yacht clubs and competed in a series of races using O'pen Bic yachts around a short course in Auckland's Viaduct Harbour. Twenty O'pen Bic boats were bought over for the event by Series organiser Bruno Trouble. The event was won by Chris Steele, who received an O'pen Bic yacht and the opportunity to be 18th man on the Alinghi boat during the Cup Final races.

== See also ==
- Louis Vuitton Cup
- Louis Vuitton Trophy

Preceded by Inaugural	First Louis Vuitton Auckland Regatta; 30 January – 14 February 2009	Succeeded by 2010
