= LunaJets =

Private jet booking platform

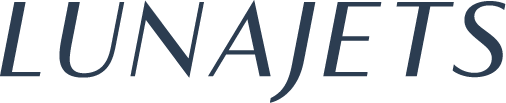
- Private Jet Charter
- Industry: Business aviation
- Founded: 2007
- Founder: Eymeric Segard
- Headquarters: Geneva, Switzerland
- Area served: Worldwide
- Key people: Guillaume Launay (CEO)
- Services: Private jet charter
- Revenue: ▲US$200 million (2025)
- Parent: Luna Aviation Group
- Website: www.lunajets.com

LunaJets is a private jet broker with headquarters in Geneva, Switzerland, where it has been based since it was founded in 2007 by former Ogilvy advertiser Eymeric Ségard. it has opened offices throughout the years in London, Paris, Riga, Madrid, Zurich, Verbier and Dubai. It is privately owned by two of the founders.

As an online broker, the company does not own any aircraft, but rather matches operators and private jet owners with end-user private jet clients to provide on-demand shorter flights and empty leg flight services. Over the years, LunaJets has developed a global network of 480 operators and access to 4,800 aircraft. LunaJets, therefore, has access to all categories of aircraft, both turboprop and jet-powered, ranging in size from Very Light Jets, such as the Cessna Citation Mustang, to VIP Airliners, such as Boeing Business Jets (BBJs) and Airbus Corporate Jets (ACJs).

== History ==
Lunajets Headquarters in Geneva (SUI)

=== 2000s ===
LunaJets was founded in December 2007 by Eymeric Segard, the company's acting CEO, after raising $US2million from private investors. The initial concept was to create an online platform to provide "empty leg flights", and last minute “empty seats” on private planes flying empty at a discount from market price. ‘Empty legs’, also called in the industry as “deadhead,” “positioning", or “ferry flights,” are planes flying without any passengers due to the need to reposition or return to their home base, among other reasons. They can be available at a discount of up to 75% of regular pricesF. At the time, entrepreneur Richard Branson launched a similar concept named "Virgin Charter" with entrepreneur Scott Duffy, but for Lunajets, the concept of jet sharing and the resale of private jet seats did not work. Virgin Charter, which at the time employed 100 people, stopped its operation in 2009 when private jet charter dropped dramatically due to the financial crisis. LunaJets, however, had sold its first empty leg seat by July 2008, shortly after Eymeric Segard had created . The same year they developed their online booking platform with proprietary technology. In 2009 they launched their website branding itself as high-tech, full-service and low-commission on-demand private jet charter flights.

=== 2010s ===
In 2010, LunaJets rebranded itself as a low-cost provider of private jet charter flights under the “fly private at the best price” slogan, offering on-demand charter flights and empty legs, and additionally opened up a new office in Hungary. In October 2014, LunaJets launched the third version of its website. In May 2015, LunaJets introduced the first version of their mobile application (available on iOS, BlackBerry and Android) presented by CNBC as the Uber of private aviation. As of 2015, LunaJets opened a regional office inside the Private Jet Terminal in Olbia, Italy and in Dubai and a new office in Ibiza. At that time, they had expanded to around 25 employees.

In 2017, LunaJets employed 40 individuals from 20 different nationalities, speaking 12 languages. The company reported 60 million Swiss francs in annual sales in 2018, a 40% increase from 2017. That year, LunaJets organized approximately 5,000 flights, a 35% increase compared to the previous year. In 2018, the economic magazine Bilan awarded LunaJets the title of Best Employer of the Year.

In 2010, LunaJets sold around 550 seats and had approximately 10 employees. By 2019, the company had increased its operations to 6,000 flights and expanded its workforce to 50 employees.

=== 2020s ===
In 2021, LunaJets reported over 100 million Swiss francs in annual sales and organized more than 8,000 flights. The company employed 60 people across six key locations, including Geneva, Paris, London, Riga, Monaco, and Dubai. LunaJets experienced a record year in 2021, particularly in flight volume, as it served over 1,100 new clients for long-range flights spanning all continents. Additionally, LunaJets opened a new office in Monaco and relaunched their London office in 2021. In August of that year, the company also operated emergency charter flights out of Kabul.

In 2022, LunaJets continued to grow, with over 12,000 movements and 1,250 new clients, generating more than 150 million Swiss francs in revenue, a 40% year-over-year increase.

LunaGroup Charter, a sister company of LunaJets, also reported a 290% year-over-year increase in 2022. In February 2023, LunaJets inaugurated a new office in Dubai, its first location outside Europe, and planned to open additional offices in Zurich and Madrid in 2023. Over the past two years, Luna Aviation Group has expanded its presence to include locations in London, Paris, Riga, and Monaco.

== Certifications and Associations ==
LunaJets holds ARGUS certification, a widely respected symbol of excellence in the aviation industry. In 2015, the company became the first charter broker outside the United States to obtain this certification, which followed an in-depth in-house audit, that is now conducted every two years.

LunaJets is a member of the European Business Aviation Association (EBAA) and the U.S. National Business Aviation Association (NBAA).

LunaJets belongs to The Air Charter Association as an ARGUS certified broker member. ARGUS is designed to promote higher levels of safety and customer service. They offer aviation consulting, global audit standards and aviation analytics.

== Subsidiaries ==
LunaJets is part of the Luna Aviation Group, which includes LunaSolutions, specializing in aircraft sales and acquisitions; LunaGroup Charter, catering to larger groups of passengers; and LunaLogistik, focusing on cargo and emergency charters.

LunaGroup Charter is a part of the Luna Aviation Group and focuses on providing charter services for larger groups of passengers. In February 2022, LunaGroup Charter facilitated the travel of over 5,500 passengers on the same day for the Six Nations Rugby Championship.

LunaSolutions, established in 2020, specializes in providing aircraft sales and acquisition services to clients interested in buying or selling private jets, including private individuals, corporations, and governments. The company aims to deliver tailored consultancy services for clients' private jet transactions. With main offices in Geneva, London, and Paris.

LunaLogistik assists private and corporate clients with air transportation services for goods, such as art, documents, hazardous materials, or large and heavy cargo. The company has main offices in Geneva and London.

== Business Model ==
LunaJets operates as an online broker, focusing on chartering private jets at competitive prices in the market. The company connects jet owners with end-user private jet clients.

== Fleet ==
- Beechcraft King Air 90GTx Turboprops
- Embraer Phenom 100 / 100E
- Eclipse Aviation Eclipse 550
- Cessna Citation Mustang
- Honda HondaJet
- Cessna Citation M2
- Cessna Citation CJ1/CJ plus
- Pilatus PC-12 NGX
- Pilatus PC-24
- Pilatus PC-12 Turboprops
- Nextant 400XT
- Legacy 450
- Piaggio Avanti P180
- Cessna Citation CJ2/CJ2 plus
- Bombardier Learjet 40/ 40XR
- Gulfstream G150
- Beechcraft King Air 200 Turboprops
- Hawker Beechcraft 750
- Hawker Beechcraft Premier 1A
- Hawker Beechcraft 400/ 400XP
- Bombardier Learjet 60 / 60XR
- Cessna Citation Encore plus
- Embraer Phenom 300 / 300 E
- Cessna Citation V
- Cessna Citation Bravo
- Cessna Citation II
- Cessna Citation CJ3 / CJ3 plus
- Cessna Citation CJ4
- Bombardier Learjet 45 / 45XR
- Cessna Citation VII
- Cessna Citation Sovereign
- Embraer Legacy 500
- Beechcraft King Air 350i
- Embraer Praetor 500
- Dassault Falcon 50 / 50 EX
- Hawker Beechcraft 4000
- Hawker Beechcraft 1000
- Gulfstream G280
- Hawker Beechcraft 850XP
- Hawker 800 series
- Cessna Citation X
- Gulfstream G200
- Beechjet 400 A
- Hawker Beechcraft 900XP
- Bombardier Challenger 300
- Cessna Citation Latitude
- Cessna Citation XLS/XLS plus
- Bombardier Learjet 75
- Bombardier Challenger 350
- Cessna Citation III
- Embraer Praetor 600
- Dassault Falcon 2000S
- Dassault Falcon 2000
- Dassault Falcon 2000XLS
- Dassault Falcon 2000EX
- Bombardier Challenger 605
- Bombardier Challenger 604
- Dassault Falcon 2000LX
- Dassault Falcon 900LX
- Bombardier Challenger 650
- Dassault Falcon 7X
- Dassault Falcon 6X
- Dassault Falcon 900C
- Dassault Falcon 900DX
- Embraer Legacy 650 / 650E
- Gulfstream 350
- Gulfstream GIV
- Gulfstream GIV-SP
- Dassault Falcon 900EX
- Dassault Falcon 900EX EASy
- Gulfstream GIII
- Bombardier Challenger 850
- Bombardier Challenger 5000
- Legacy 600
- Bombardier Global 6000
- Embraer Lineage 1000 VIP
- Gulfstream G500
- Gulfstream G550
- Gulfstream 650
- Fairchild Dornier 328
- Dassault Falcon 900B
- Gulfstream GV
- Gulfstream G450
- Dassault Falcon 8X
- Bombardier Global 5500
- Bombardier Global 6500
- Airbus ACJ318
- Fairchild Metro 23
- Airbus ACJ319
- Boeing Business Jet BBJ 3
- Boeing Business Jet BBJ 2
- Gulfstream 700
- Dornier 228
- Airbus ACJ30
- Dornier 328
- Saab 340
- Boeing BBJ
- Fokker 50
- Embraer ERJ 145
