= Team Origin =

Career
- Yacht club: Royal Thames Yacht Club
- Established: 2007
- Nation: United Kingdom
- Team principal(s): Sir Keith Mills
- CEO: Grant Simmer
- Skipper: Ben Ainslie
- Notable sailors: Iain Percy; Andrew Simpson
- Notable victories: The 1851 Cup; 2010 World Match Racing Tour

Yachts
- Sail no.: Boat name
- GBR–75: GBR 75

Team Origin was Great Britain's bid to compete in the 33rd and 34th America's Cups. It was launched in January 2007 but stopped running the racing team in 2010. The syndicate was founded by Sir Keith Mills, also known for being the deputy chairman for the organizing committee of the London 2012 Olympic bid. Grant Simmer was the CEO and the team competed under the burgee of the Royal Thames Yacht Club.

Britain's involvement in the America's Cup dates back to the very start when the Aurora was second in the original race won by America in 1851. Britain has unsuccessfully challenged many times since.

Ben Ainslie went on to form Ben Ainslie Racing (BAR) in 2012 to compete in the 2017 America's Cup.

== History ==
Sir Keith Mills initially announced his intention to create a team to challenge for the Americas' Cup on 4 January 2007, and announced the decision to appoint Mike Sanderson as Team Director on 29 March 2007. In May of the same year, Team Origin announced it was becoming a partner of the RYA Onboard scheme, which has over 60 centres across the UK. Sanderson commented at the time that he hoped to "raise awareness and participation of the sport.

Less than a month later, it was announced that Team Origin would be partnering the Royal Thames Yacht Club (of which Sir Keith Mills is a member), because of its balance between old and new, tradition and technology, and also its central location in Knightsbridge, London.

After its acquisition of SUI-75 in May 2007, an almost identical boat to SUI-64, which was used by the Swiss to win the 31st Americas' Cup match, all that was missing was the crew, the majority of which were announced in September 2007.

In December 2007 the team announced its intention to scale-back activities in anticipation of legal wrangling causing significant delays to the 33rd Cup's schedule, anticipating that 2009's cup would be delayed by at least 2 years.

Team Origin competed in the Louis Vuitton Pacific Series in 2009 and were a participant of the Louis Vuitton Trophy. In May 2010 Team Origin appointed Grant Simmer as the team's new CEO, replacing Mike Sanderson.

In August 2010, the Royal Thames Yacht Club and Team Origin hosted BMW Oracle in Cowes to compete in The 1851 Cup. There were 2 trophies to be won. The Royal Thames Cup for a race clockwise around the Isle of Wight which was a re-enactment of the race in 1851 which initiated the Americas Cup which BMW Oracle won. The trophy for the overall 1851 event was The Trafalgar Cup for the match racing series which was won by Team Origin.

In 2010 Ben Ainslie and Team Origin won a Tour Card for the World Match Racing Tour, and despite only entering six of the nine events they won in Sweden, Bermuda and the Monsoon Cup in Malaysia and were crowned ISAF Match Racing World Champions 2010.

In October, it was announced that Mills had scrapped plans to campaign for the 2013 America's Cup, which came as shock to the team. The decision was based on the rule changes for the America's Cup to the boat specifications that meant the team had no chance of winning.

In January 2012, Ben Ainslie announced the foundation of a new team to complete in the 2017 America's Cup, called Ben Ainslie Racing (BAR).

Team Origin Events is still involved in running the America's Cup World Series.

== Team Members ==
Management:

Role	Name	Nationality
Team Principal	Sir Keith Mills	(United Kingdom) GBR
Partner and Investor	Charles Dunstone	(United Kingdom) GBR
Team Director	Grant Simmer	(Australia) AUS

Boat Crew:

Role	Name	Nationality
Helmsman	Ben Ainslie	(United Kingdom) GBR
Tactician	Iain Percy	(United Kingdom) GBR
Strategist and Aft Grinder		(United Kingdom) GBR
Grinder	Chris Brittle	(United Kingdom) GBR
Grinder	David Carr	(United Kingdom) GBR
Grinder	Pawel Bielecki	(Poland) POL
Mastman	Julien Cressant	(France) FRA
Bowman	Matt Cornwell	(United Kingdom) GBR
Boat Captain	Nick Bice	(Australia) AUS

== Boats ==
In May 2007 TEAMORIGIN announced that they had purchased SUI-75, the training and testing boat used by former America's Cup holders Alinghi. It was rebranded GBR-75 during the 32nd America's Cup in Valencia, and sailed in TEAMORIGIN livery for the first time on Saturday 14 July 2007, off Port America, Valencia, Spain.
