= Aleph Sailing Team =

Career
- Established: 2009
- Nation: France
- CEO: Philippe Ligot
- Skipper: Bertrand Pacé

Yachts
- Sail no.: Boat name

Aleph Sailing Team is an all-French yacht racing team that competes in match racing style sailing.

== Team French Spirit ==
The team was founded in 2009 with Philippe Ligot as managing director and Bertrand Pacé as skipper. It first competed in the Louis Vuitton Trophy Nice Côte d’Azur as Team French Spirit. In 2010 it began competing as Aleph Sailing Team. It was later renamed Aleph-Équipe de France after a paternship with the Équipe de France was decided.

In April 2012, after competing in the first 3 events of the 2012 ACWS, Aleph-Équipe de France announced its withdrawal from both the 2012 ACWS and the 34th America's cup, citing financial reasons and lack of sponsorship.

In August 2011, LunaJets announced its partnership with Aleph Sailing team for the 2012, RC44 sailing race circuit. The partnership continues for its third consecutive year in 2014.
