= Karol Jabłoński =

Polish sailor (born 1962)

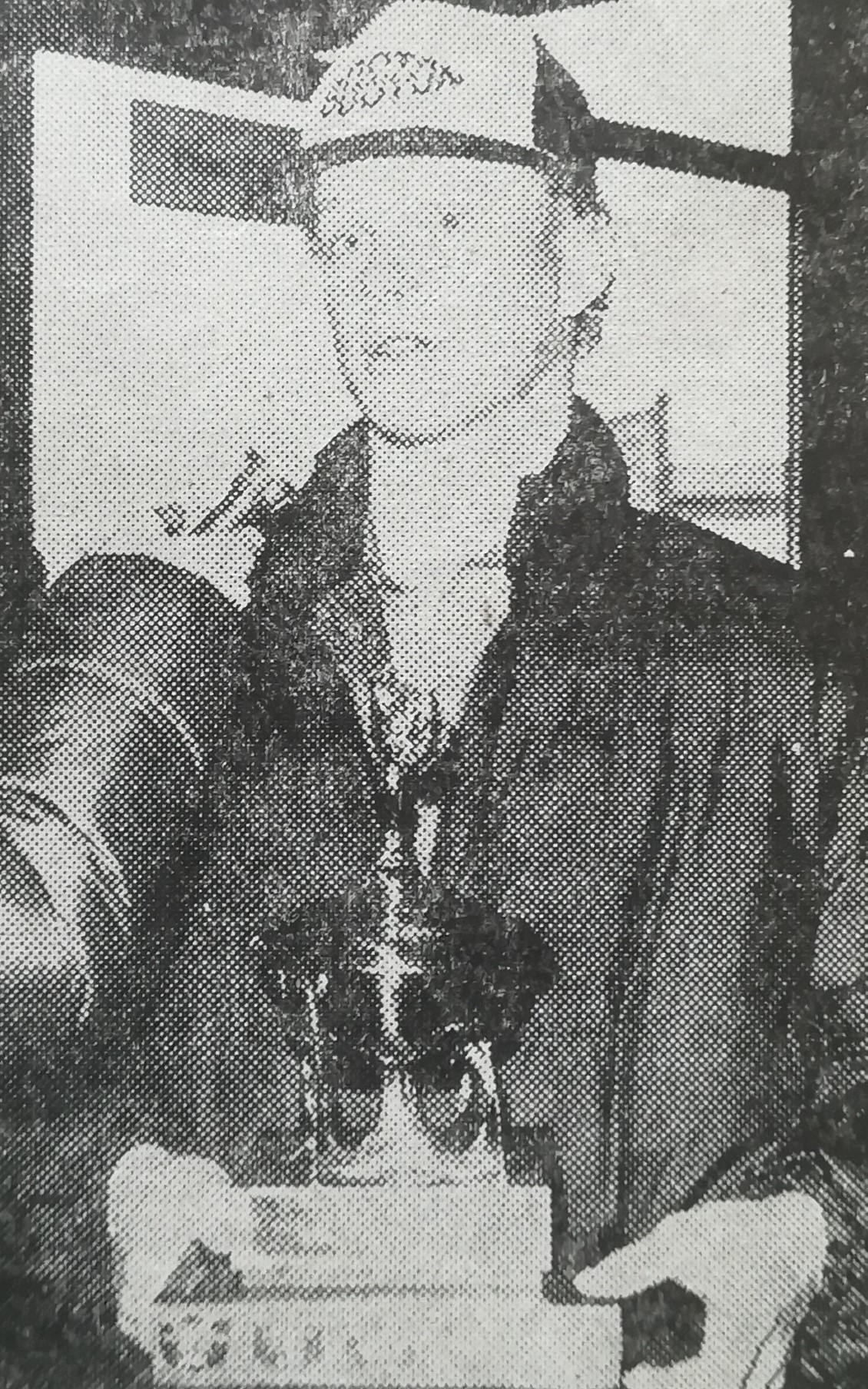
Karol Jablonski.jpg

Karol Jabłoński (born August 25, 1962 in Giżycko, Poland) Polish regatta helmsman, skipper, ice sailor. One of the most versatile sailors, succeeded in sea sailing, match racing and ice sailing. Several time World and European champion. Recognised in the international sailing environment, participating in international regattas. Started his career in the Baza Mrągowo sailing club, current representative of Olsztyn Sailing Club.

== Sailing career ==
His early career began on the lake in Tałty. In 2007, as the first Polish skipper, competed in prestigious regatta – America’s Cup. In the 2007 America's Cup in Valencia he was the helmsman of the host team Desafío Español and placed 3rd in the challenger regatta 2007 Louis Vuitton Cup. In 2007 was the helmsman at United Internet Germany which was preparing for the 33rd America’s Cup.

In the years 2009–2010 the helmsman of Team Synergy, succeeding with the Russian team in the Louis Vuitton Trophy.

In 2002 won the ISAF Open Match Racing World Championship with Polish crew and went on to lead the ISAF ranking during 18 months of record streak. In years 2001–2002 he was the skipper of “Polska 1” team planning to start in the America’s Cup.

A multiple medallist different sea sailing yacht classes and winner of various international regatta in the following yacht classes:

· One Tone,

· 50’,

· Mumm 36,

· ILC 46,

· ILC 40,

· Sydney 40,

· Wally and Swan

· TP52

Winner of i.a. Admiral’s Cup, Commodores’ Cup, Copa del Rey, Kiel Week, Sardinias Cup, SORC, Palmavella, Zegna Trophy. In Atlanta 1996 he was the consultant coach of the Polish Olympic team and had a share in the gold medal of Mateusz Kusznierewicz in the Finn class.

The most titled ice sailor in the DN class history.

== Summary of sailing career ==
Regatta	Team	Place
2012 Giraglia Rolex Cup	Near Miss	1st
2010 Louis Vuitton Trophy – La Maddalena	Team Synergy	2nd
2009 Louis Vuitton Trophy – Nice	Team Synergy	3rd
2009 RC 44 Annual Match Racing	Team Organika	3rd
2009 RC 44 Portoroz Cup Match Racing	Team Organika	2nd
2009 RC 44 Austria Cup Match Racing	Team Organika	2nd
2008 Swan 45 Int. Italian Championships	Team Early Bird	3rd
2007 America’s Cup Louis Vuitton Cup	Desafio Español	3rd
2005 Maxi Yachts Rolex Cup	Wally ‘96 Team Y3K	1st
2001 Maxi Yachts Rolex Cup	Wally ‘ 96 Y3K	2nd
1999 Mumm 36 World Championships	Team Thomas I Punkt	1st
1999 Sydney’40 World Championships	Team MK Cafe	2nd
1999 Match Racing European Championships	Team MK Cafe	2nd
1997 ILC’40 World Championships	Team Pinta	1st
1994 Mumm 36 Commodores Cup	Team Thomas I Punkt	1st
1994 One Ton Class Circuit	Team Pinta	1st
1993 50’ Admiral’s Cup	Team Container	2nd

=== Match Racing ===
Regatta	Team	Place
2004 World Championships in Match Racing	Team Jabłoński	2nd
2003 World Championships in Match Racingu	Team Jabłoński	3rd
2003 European Championships in Match Racing	Team Jabłoński	1st
2002 World Championships in Match Racing	Team Jabłoński	1st
1999 European Championships in Match Racing	Team Jabłoński	2nd

=== DN Class Ice Sailing ===
==== World Championships ====
Year	Medal	Regatta Site
1992	Gold	Arsunda, Sweden
1993	Silver	Lake Geneva, Switzerland
1994	Silver	Nieporęt, Poland
1995	Gold	Montreal, Canada
1996	Gold	Vienna, Austria
1997	Gold	Lake St. Clair, United States
2000	Gold	Lake Hjalmaren, Sweden
2001	Gold	Saginaw Bay, United States
2002	Silver	Haapsalu, Estonia
2003	Gold	Lake Champlain, United States
2004	Silver	Lake Balaton, Hungary
2014	Gold	Haapsalu, Estonia
2015	Gold	Lake Ontario, Canada
2016	Gold	Lake Glan, Sweden
2017	Gold	Lake Kegonsa, United States
2018	Gold	Lake Wielimie, Poland
2020	Silver	Orsa Lake, Sweden
2022	Silver	Lake Kegonsa, United States

==== European Championships ====
Year	Medal	Regatta Site
1992	Gold	Årsunda, Sweden
2001	Gold	Lipno nad Vltavou, Czech Republic
2011	Gold	Kuressaare, Estonia
2013	Gold	Lake Niegocin, Poland
2014	Gold	Haapsalu, Estonia
2015	Gold	Võrtsjärv, Estonia
2017	Gold	Lake Balaton, Hungary
2018	Bronze	Lake Wielimie, Poland
