= Jochen Schümann =

German sailor

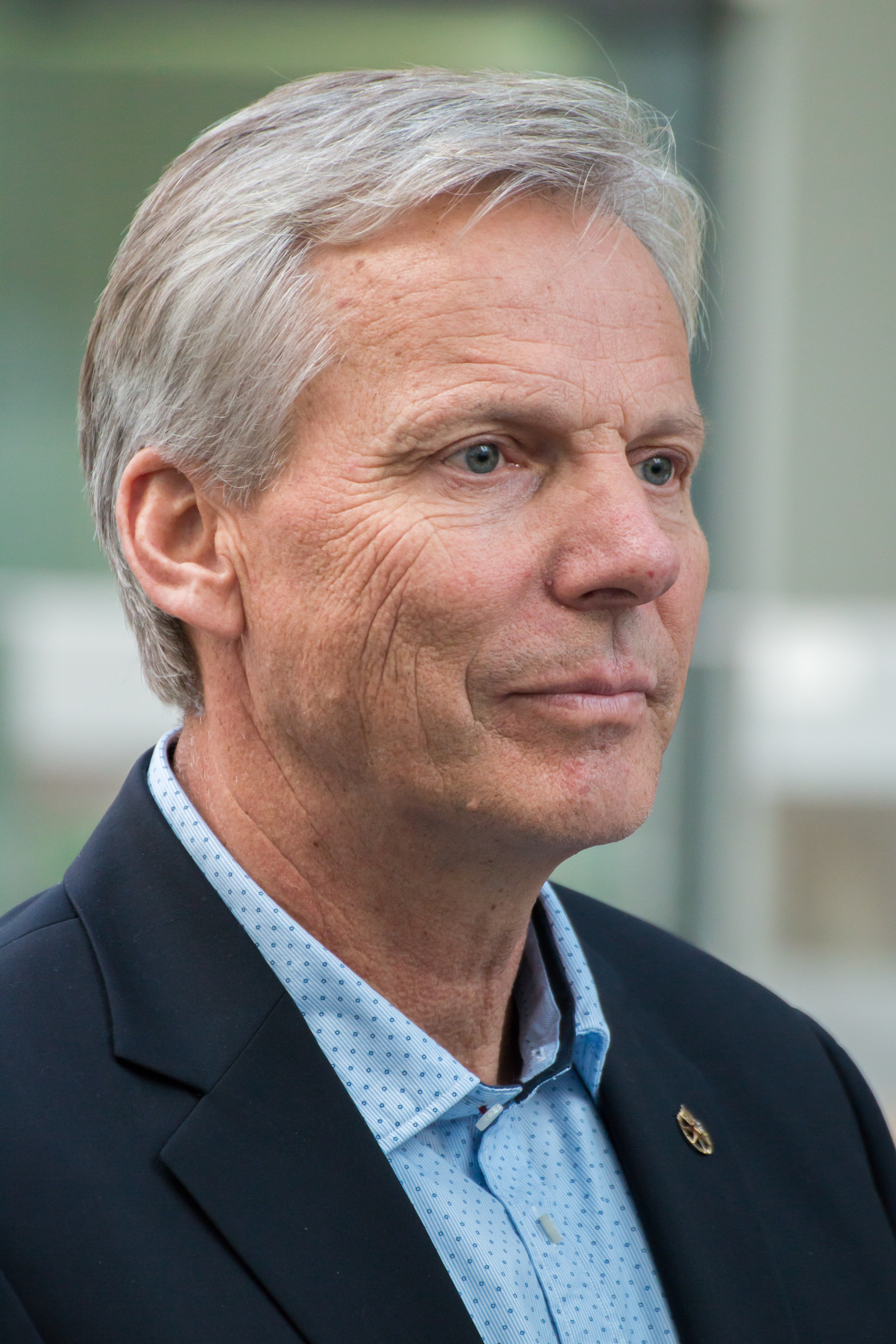
- Schühmann in 2015

Personal information
- Nationality: Germany
- Born: 8 June 1954 (age 72) East Berlin, East Germany

Sailing career
- Sport: Sailing
- Classes: Finn, Soling, 5.5m
Medal record
Sailing
Representing East Germany
Olympic Games
Gold medal – first place	1976 Montreal	Finn class
Gold medal – first place	1988 Seoul	Soling class
Representing Germany
Olympic Games
Gold medal – first place	1996 Atlanta	Soling class
Silver medal – second place	2000 Sydney	Soling class
5.5 Metre World Championship
Gold medal – first place	2001 Glücksburg	5.5m
Gold medal – first place	2005 Sydney	5.5m
Silver medal – second place	2006 Medemblik	5.5m
Bronze medal – third place	2012 Boltenhagen	5.5m

Jochen Schümann (German pronunciation: [ˈjɔxn̩ ˈʃyːman]; born 8 June 1954) is a German sailor and three-time Olympic champion.

He competed at the 1976 Summer Olympics in Montreal, where he won a gold medal in the finn class.

He competed in the Soling class at the 1988, 1996 and 2000 Summer Olympics, winning two gold medals and one silver medal in this class.

== America's Cup Team Alinghi ==
Schümann participated and won the 2003 and 2007 America's Cup for Swiss Team Alinghi acting as sporting director.

== ALL4ONE Challenge ==
He is currently involved with ALL4ONE Challenge in the Louis Vuitton Trophy.

== Awards ==
He received the 1996 World Sailor of the Year Award from the International Sailing Federation.

== See also ==
- List of athletes with the most appearances at Olympic Games
- List of people from Berlin
