= Club Nautico di Roma =

Yacht club in Rome, Italy

- Burgee
- Founded: 2006
- Location: Porto di Roma, Ostia Lido
- Website: www.clubnauticoroma.it

Club Nautico di Roma is a private yacht club located in Rome, Italy. It was founded in November 2006. It promotes and organizes various water-sports related events, in sailing, motor boating, fishing and scuba diving.

== History ==
Club Nautico di Roma and its Mascalzone Latino team were announced as the official Challenger of Record of the 34th America's Cup, but withdrew on May 12, 2011, citing challenges in agreeing with their sponsors on a budget sufficient to fund a competitive team.
