= NZL 92 =

Racing sailboat

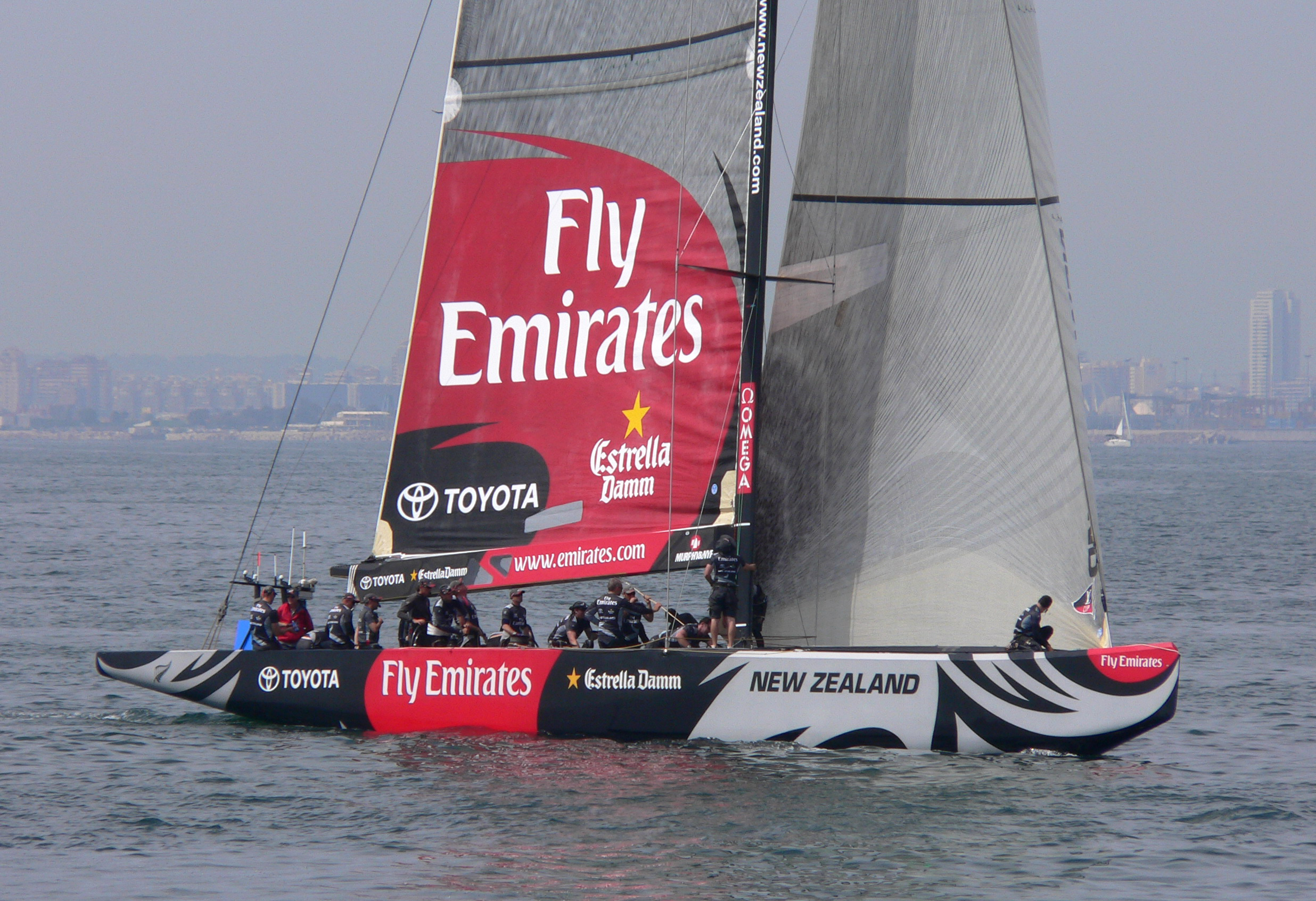
- NZL 92 in 2007.
- Yacht club: Royal New Zealand Yacht Squadron
- Nation: New Zealand
- Class: International America's Cup Class
- Sail no: NZL–92
- Designer(s): Marcelino Botin, Clay Oliver and Nick Holroyd
- Builder: Cookson Boatbuilders; Auckland, New Zealand
- Launched: 2006
- Owner(s): Emirates Team New Zealand

Racing career
- Notable victories: Louis Vuitton Cup 2007
- America's Cup: 2007

NZL 92 is an International America's Cup Class racing boat sailed by Emirates Team New Zealand that won the Louis Vuitton Cup 2007 but was beaten in the 2007 America's Cup by the defender Alinghi team sailing SUI 100.

== Design ==
In 2004, Emirates Team New Zealand head Grant Dalton revamped the Team New Zealand program. Following the unfortunate defeat of a design-led campaign in 2003 which was mainly due to deficiences in the boat, Dalton saw the need for a combination of a sailor-led campaign with a 'good all round boat' as seen in the 2003 America's Cup winner Alinghi's SUI 64. Two new yachts were designed and built relatively quickly and were assigned the sail numbers NZL 84 and NZL 92 respectively. The two new TNZ yachts were among the first of their generation to be built. NZL 84 debuted in Louis Vuitton Act 10, and beat Alinghi in Act 12.

With its "full" bow similar to NZL 84, NZL 92 quickly mirrored the race-winning results that NZL 84 had established in the Louis Vuitton Cup Acts leading up to the Louis Vuitton Cup 2007.

Initially considered unattractive, the unique full bow on both NZL 92 and NZL 84 are quickly appearing to set a new evolution of yacht design and style in the 2007 America's Cup. This is reflected in the comments of race commentator and Cup organizer Bruno Trouble who remarked, 'ugly boats quickly become attractive once they start winning races!'

When compared with NZL 82 and NZL 81, and most of the 2007 America's Cup edition boats which have a very flat double-knuckle bow, with exception of both Alinghi's SUI 64 and BMW Oracle Racing's USA 71.

Both the benchmark in aesthetics and speed with some of the other 10 challengers mimicking its design, particularly in the bow. This can be seen especially on Areva-Challenge and CHINATeam, FRA 93 and CHN 95 respectively.

== Career ==
NZL 92 won the 2007 Louis Vuitton Cup in five races on the 6 June 2007 against Luna Rossa Challenge ITA 94, but was defeated by the defender Alinghi SUI 100 in the 2007 America's Cup, losing 5 races to 2 on 3 July 2007.

== See also ==
- Boat racing
