= Orient Express Racing Team =

French yacht racing team

Career
- Yacht club: Société Nautique de Saint-Tropez
- Established: 2001
- Nation: France
- CEO: Bruno Dubois and Stephane Kandler
- Skipper: Quentin Delapierre

Yachts
- Sail no.: Boat name

Orient Express Racing Team is a French yacht racing team that competes in International America's Cup Class races. The team has formally competed as K-Challenge, Areva Challenge (between 2005 and 2007) and ALL4ONE Challenge.

== History ==
As Areva Challenge they participated in the Louis Vuitton Cup 2007, the challenger series held prior to the 32nd America's Cup. They were eliminated in the Round Robin phase.

They also competed in the Louis Vuitton Pacific Series in 2009 and are part of the Louis Vuitton Trophy, hosting the Louis Vuitton Trophy - Nice event.

In February 2023 the team was rebranded to Orient Express Racing Team after sponsorship from Orient Express and Accor. The team is currently competing in the 2024 Louis Vuitton Cup (Challenger Selections Series) attempting to qualify for the 2024 America's Cup.

In 2026, the team announced plans to use a chase boat powered by a hydrogen fuel cell system developed by the French technology company, Hopium. The project marked the first public use of the company's fuel cell technology, with performance data intended to support the development of hydrogen-powered applications within the marine industry. The initiative was also presented as an example of technological innovation in professional sailing and the wider marine sector.
