= Ben Ainslie =

British sailor

Sir Ben Ainslie CBE
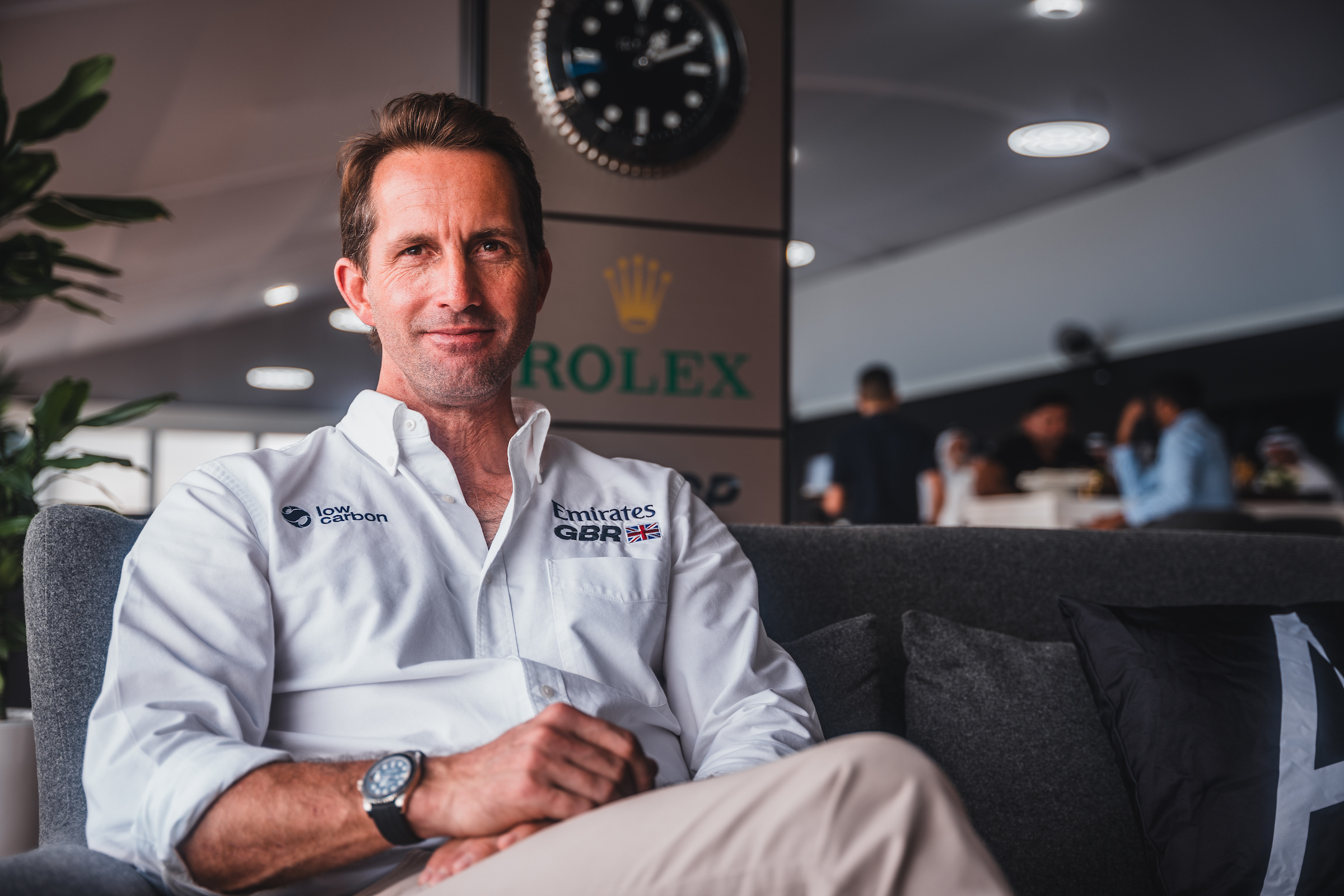
- Ainslie in 2024

Personal information
- Full name: Charles Benedict Ainslie
- Nationality: United Kingdom
- Born: 5 February 1977 (age 49) Macclesfield, Cheshire, England
- Weight: 90 kg (198 lb)
- Spouse: Georgie Thompson (m. 2014)

Sailing career
- Sport: Sailing
- Classes: Finn, Laser, Optimist, America's Cup
Medal record
Sailing
Representing Great Britain
Event	1st	2nd	3rd
Olympic Games	4	1	0
Olympic Class World Championship	8	0	3
Other Sailing World	3	1	1
Total	15	2	4
Olympic Games
Gold medal – first place	2000 Sydney	Laser
Gold medal – first place	2004 Athens	Finn
Gold medal – first place	2008 Beijing	Finn
Gold medal – first place	2012 London	Finn
Silver medal – second place	1996 Atlanta	Laser
World Championships
Gold medal – first place	1993 Takapuna	Laser Radial
Gold medal – first place	1995 Hamilton	Laser (Youth)
Gold medal – first place	1998	Laser
Gold medal – first place	1999 Melbourne	Laser
Gold medal – first place	2002 Athens	Finn
Gold medal – first place	2003 Cádiz	Finn
Gold medal – first place	2004 Rio de Janeiro	Finn
Gold medal – first place	2005 Moscow	Finn
Gold medal – first place	2008 Melbourne	Finn
Gold medal – first place	2010 Tour	Match Racing
Gold medal – first place	2012 Falmouth	Finn
Bronze medal – third place	1996 Simon's Town	Laser
Bronze medal – third place	1997 Algarrobo	Laser
Bronze medal – third place	2000 Cancun	Laser
Bronze medal – third place	2009 Brighton	Etchells

Sir Charles Benedict Ainslie (born 5 February 1977) is a British competitive sailor. He is the most successful sailor in Olympic history, having won medals at five consecutive Olympics from 1996 onwards, including gold at four consecutive Games from 2000 to 2012. He is one of three men to win medals in five different Olympic Games in sailing, doing so after Torben Grael and Robert Scheidt, and the second to win four gold medals, after Paul Elvstrøm.

Ainslie is CEO of Athena Sports Group which includes the roles of team principal, CEO and skipper of Athena Racing and CEO of the Emirates Great Britain SailGP Team. He is also a Patron of the 1851 Trust, a British charity that supports young people in sailing and STEM education.

== Early life and education ==
Ainslie was born in Macclesfield, England to Roddy and Sue Ainslie. Roddy captained a boat that took part in the first Whitbread Round The World Race in 1973. Ben's elder sister, Fleur, is married to Jerome Pels, former secretary general of the International Sailing Federation (ISAF). Ainslie was educated at two independent schools: at the Terra Nova School in a rural area near the village of Holmes Chapel in Cheshire in north west England, and Truro School in the city of Truro, Cornwall, followed by Peter Symonds Sixth Form, Winchester, Hampshire.

== Career ==
Ainslie learned to sail at Restronguet Creek near Falmouth, Cornwall.

He started sailing at the age of eight and first competed at the age of ten. His first international competition was aged twelve at the 1989 Optimist world championships held in Japan where he placed 73rd.

=== Olympics ===
- Silver in the 1996 Summer Olympics in the Laser class
- Gold in the 2000 Summer Olympics in the Laser class
- Gold in the 2004 Summer Olympics in the Finn class
- Gold in the 2008 Summer Olympics in the Finn class
- Gold in the 2012 Summer Olympics in the Finn class

Ainsle originally sailed the Laser but he gained a reported 18 kilograms (40 lb; 2 st 12 lb) and moved to the heavier weight Finn. Both his gold medal-winning Laser and Finn dinghies are currently displayed at the National Maritime Museum Cornwall.

On 19 May 2012, Ainslie became the first person to carry the Olympic torch in the UK. Starting the 70-day tour of the United Kingdom at Land's End, he was the first of 8,000 torch carriers. He was selected on 11 August 2012 to carry the flag for the Great Britain team at the London 2012 Olympics closing ceremony.

=== World Championship ===
==== World Championships titles ====
- 1st 1993 Laser Radial World Championships
- 1st 1995 IYRU Youth Sailing World Championships in Hamilton, Bermuda.
- 1st 1998 Laser World Championships
- 1st 1999 Laser World Championships
- 1st 2002 Finn Gold Cup
- 1st 2003 ISAF Sailing World Championships which effectively is the Finn Gold Cup
- 1st 2004 Finn Gold Cup
- 1st 2005 Finn Gold Cup
- 1st 2008 Finn Gold Cup
- 1st 2010 ISAF Open Match Racing World Championship
- 1st 2012 Finn Gold Cup

==== Other World Championships results ====
- 73rd 1989 Optimist World Championship held in Japan
- 109th 1991 Optimist World Championship held in Greece
- 37th 1992 Optimist World Championship held in Argentina
- 2nd 1994 IYRU Youth Sailing World Championships in Marathon
- 43rd 1994 Laser World Championship
- 21st 1995 Laser World Championship
- 3rd 1996 Laser World Championship
- 3rd 1997 Laser World Championship
- 3rd 2000 Laser World Championship
- 3rd 2009 Etchells World Championship
- 11th 2011 ISAF Sailing World Championships which effectively is the Finn World Championship

At the 2011 ISAF Sailing World Championships he was in a winning position going into the closing stages of the regatta but was disqualified under rule 69 (gross misconduct) for physically threatening a photographer. Ainslie felt the photographer's boat's wake had prevented him from passing a competitor.

=== America's Cup ===
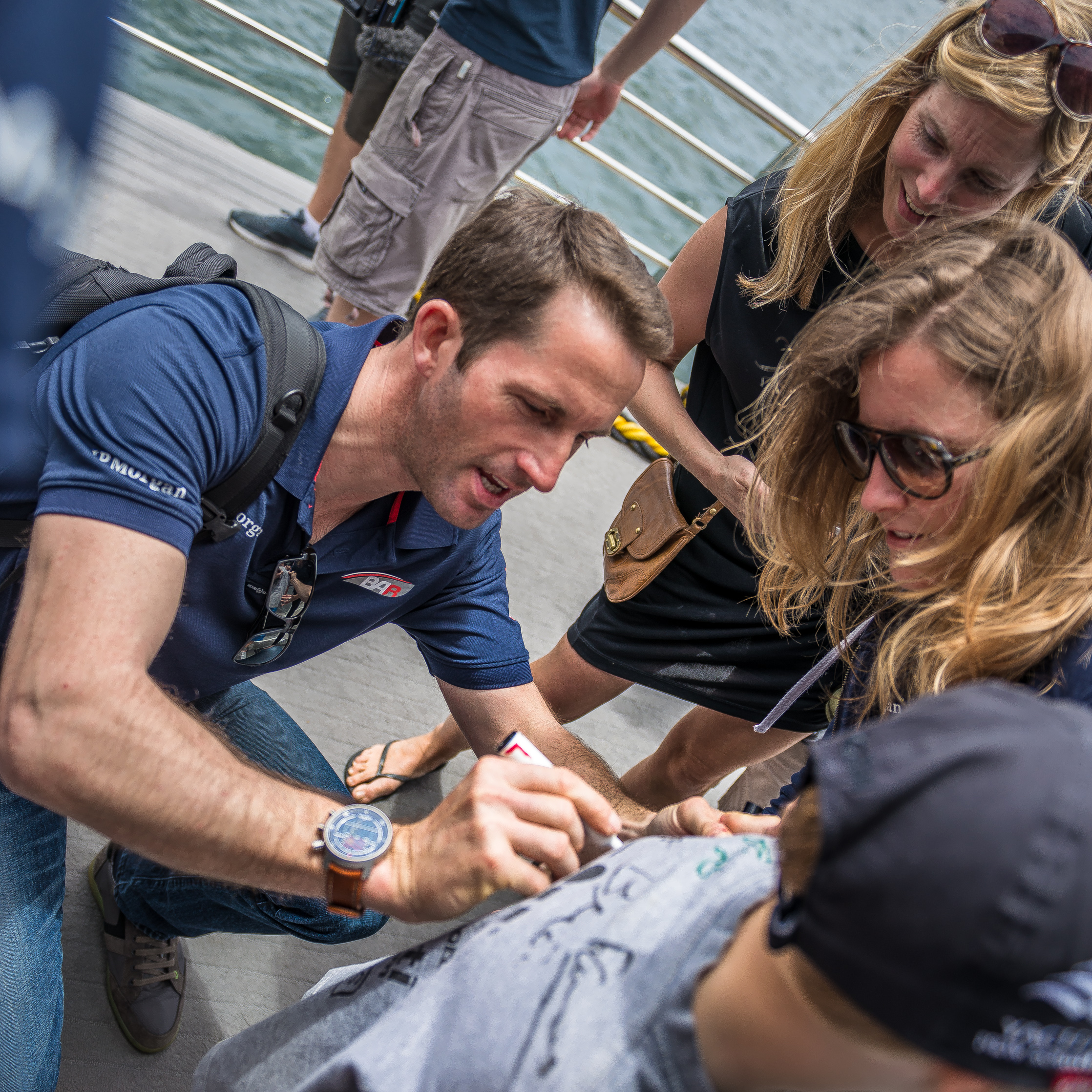
Sir Ben Ainslie with fans in 2014

- One World Challenge – Seattle Yacht Club
- Team New Zealand – Royal New Zealand Yacht Squadron

At the beginning of 2005 Ainslie worked in the role of tactician in the New Zealand-based Team New Zealand who were preparing to compete in the challenger selection process to win the right to Challenge for the 32nd America's Cup. In May 2005 Ainslie took the decision to relinquish the role of tactician and focus on improving his match racing skills as helmsman of the 'B' boat used to practice and tune the race boat helmed by Dean Barker.

- Team Origin – Royal Thames Yacht Club

Ainslie figure headed a British challenge for the Cup alongside Sir Keith Mills the team was named Team Origin. However this challenge withdrew without competing following a period of discussion regarding the future format of the event.

- Oracle Team USA – Golden Gate Yacht Club

For the 2013 America's Cup, Ainslie was recruited as a tactician by Oracle Team USA, as a replacement for John Kostecki during an Oracle practice session on 11 September 2013. On 12 September, the following day, he replaced Kostecki going into race six of the 2013 America's Cup. His Oracle Team USA beat Team New Zealand in the America's Cup decider in San Francisco on 25 September.

- Ben Ainslie Racing – Royal Yacht Squadron Racing Ltd

In January 2012, Ben Ainslie announced the formation of an eponymous team to compete in the America's Cup: Ben Ainslie Racing (BAR). His team competed in the AC45 class of the 2011–13 America's Cup World Series, 2014 Extreme Sailing Series and set a multihull record for the Round the Island Race. The team won the 2015–16 America's Cup World Series but were eliminated in the semi-finals of the 2017 Louis Vuitton Challenger's Trophy competition to determine the challenger for the 2017 America's Cup.

- INEOS TEAM UK – Royal Yacht Squadron Racing Ltd

In April 2018 Ainslie announced the Americas Cup team would be renamed INEOS TEAM UK in partnership with INEOS and Sir Jim Ratcliffe. Again based out of the Portsmouth HQ the team built two new 75-foot foiling monohull yachts to compete for the 36th Americas Cup set which took place in Auckland, New Zealand in 2021.

On 21 October 2020, Ben and INEOS TEAM UK launched their race boat for the 36th America's Cup from their HQ in Auckland, naming the AC75 race boat 'Britannia' Following a disappointing performance in the Auckland ACWS event in December 2020, the team spent the following three weeks making modifications to their boat Britannia ahead of the start of the Prada Cup qualifying series. This included a new mast and sails as well as modifications to the hull and foils. The team received support from INEOS sponsored Mercedes-AMG Petronas F1 Team.

INEOS Team UK dominated the Round Robin phase of the Prada Cup which saw them race and beat each of the two other challenger teams three times, securing their place in the Prada Cup Final beginning on 13 February 2021. The team's place in the Prada Cup final marked a significant point in their campaign, being the furthest any British challenge had progressed in the competition since the introduction of a challenger selection series.

After Luna Rossa Prada Pirelli's win in the Prada Cup Semi-Finals against American Magic, the American team was eliminated from the event, securing the Italian team's place in the Prada Cup Final alongside INEOS Team UK.

The Prada Cup Finals were held in predominantly light wind (8-14 knots), with Luna Rossa showing great improvement in boat handling, winning the first 5 races consecutively. INEOS Team UK showed superior downwind pace in Race 6, taking their sole race win before Luna Rossa dominated Day 4 to take their sixth and seventh race win, winning the Prada Cup overall, and securing their place in the 36th America's Cup Match against Emirates Team New Zealand.

On 17 March 2021, following Emirates Team New Zealand's defence of their title (their seventh win overall), the Chairman of Royal Yacht Squadron Racing, Bertie Bicket, issued a pre-arranged, "friendly" challenge to the Commodore of the Royal New Zealand Yacht Squadron, Aaron Young. This made Royal Yacht Squadron Racing Ltd and their renamed sailing team INEOS Britannia the Challenger of Record for the 37th Louis Vuitton America's Cup.

- INEOS Britannia – Royal Yacht Squadron Racing Ltd

The challenge agreed that the 37th Americas Cup would be raced in the America's Cup 75 (AC75), a 23 m (75 ft) foiling monohull class, that there would be nationality rules in place, a cost reduction programme and that the America's Cup will be raced in Barcelona as a first-to-seven-wins series from 12 October 2024 (expected to be completed on or before 21 October 2024). The Royal Yacht Squadron's challenge is the first time a British team had competed in three consecutive America's Cup cycles since 1930 when Sir Thomas Lipton challenged in the yacht Shamrock V.

On 4 October 2024, after a 7–4 win, the yacht Britannia INEOS Britannia defeated Luna Rossa representing Circolo della Vela Sicilia winning the Louis Vuitton Challenger Selections Series to challenge Emirates Team New Zealand for the 37th America's Cup. This is the first time the UK has challenged the America's Cup since 1964 when Tony Boyden's sovereign (representing the Royal Thames Yacht Club) lost 4-0 to Eric Ridder's Constellation.

The match was raced between Taihoro, helmed by Peter Burling and Nathan Outteridge, and Britannia helmed by Ainslie and Dylan Fletcher, the winners of qualifying event - the 2024 Louis Vuitton Cup. Races were held, from 12 October – 19 October, with Reserve Days on 14-15 Oct, 17. Eventually losing the series 7-2, INEOS Britannia became the first UK challenger to score in an America's Cup match since 1934 when Sir Thomas Sopwith's Endeavour (representing the Royal Yacht Squadron) lost 4-2 to Harold S. Vanderbilt's Rainbow.

- Athena Racing – Royal Yacht Squadron Racing Ltd

On 23 January 2025 it was announced that Ben Ainslie had split from the INEOS sponsorship and that consequently he would be continue the 38th America's Cup as the Challenger of Record with the team renamed Athena Racing.

=== World Match Racing Tour ===
In December 2010, Ainslie finished in first place in the World Match Racing Tour, and is the 2010 ISAF Match Racing Champion.

=== The Extreme Sailing Series ===
In January 2014, it was announced that Ainslie would compete in the 2014 Extreme Sailing Series as part of his preparation for the America's Cup. He raced for J.P. Morgan BAR, finishing 5th.

=== SailGP ===
Ainslie helmed the Great Britain SailGP Team's F50 in the SailGP Championship between 2021–22 and 2023-24 seasons.

=== Other significant results ===
- 1st 1993 Laser Radial European Championship, Greece
- 1st 2006 Rolex Maxi Yacht Cup – Maxi – Alfa Romeo
- 1st 2008 Rolex Maxi Yacht Cup – Mini Maxi – Alfa Romeo 3
- 1st 2009 Transpac Race and monohull record time (5 days 14 hours) Alfa Romeo
- 4th 2010 Team Origin – TP52 Audi Medcup
- 2013 The Round the Island Race record and line Honors JPMorgan
- 1st 2015/2016 Americas Cup World Series Land Rover BAR

== Personal life ==
Ainslie lives in London. He is a member of the Sea View Yacht Club and is an honorary member of the Royal Yacht Squadron. He supports Chelsea.

On 20 December 2014, Ainslie married former Sky Sports News presenter Georgie Thompson. The couple have a daughter, Bellatrix, born in 2016. and a son, Fox, born in 2021.

== Politics ==
In August 2014, Ainslie was one of 200 public figures who were signatories to a letter to The Guardian expressing their hope that Scotland would vote to remain part of the United Kingdom in September's referendum on that issue.

== Awards and honours ==
- 1995: British Yachtsman of the Year, and in 1999, 2000 and 2002.
- 1998: International Sailing Federation World Sailor of the Year, and also in 2002, 2008 and 2012. Ainslie was also nominated in 2004 and 2011.
- 2001 New Year Honours: Appointed Member of the Order of the British Empire (MBE) for services to yachting
- 2002: Honorary degree, University of Chichester
- 2005 New Year Honours: Appointed Officer of the Order of the British Empire (OBE) for services to sailing
- 2005: Honorary Doctor of Laws, University of Exeter
- 2007: Honorary Doctor of Sport, Southampton Solent University
- 2008: Nominated for BBC Sports Personality of the Year and also in 2012 and 2013.
- 2009 New Year Honours: Appointed Commander of the Order of the British Empire (CBE) for services to sport
- 2013 New Year Honours: Appointed Knight Bachelor for services to sailing
