= Bertrand Pacé =

French sailor competing in match racing (born 1961)

Personal information
- Born: 15 August 1961 (age 65) Petite-Synthe, France

Sailing career
- Sport: Sailing
Medal record
Sailing
Representing France
World Championships
Gold medal – first place	1994 La Rochelle	Match racing

Bertrand Pacé (born 15 August 1961 in Petite-Synthe) is a French sailor competing in offshore racing. He won the 1994 World Match Racing Championships in La Rochelle, France.

Pacé was a navigator for the Challenge Kis France at the 1987 Louis Vuitton Cup and a backup helmsman and navigator at the 1992 Louis Vuitton Cup. At the 1995 Louis Vuitton Cup, Pacé was again part of the French challenge. He was promoted to skipper for the team's challenge at the 2000 Louis Vuitton Cup. Pacé joined Team New Zealand for the unsuccessful defence of the 2003 America's Cup. Originally hired to be the backup helmsman to Dean Barker, Pace replaced Hamish Pepper as tactician for races 4 and 5.

Pacé then became a team member of BMW Oracle Racing for the 2007 Louis Vuitton Cup. He joined Aleph Sailing Team for the Louis Vuitton Trophy in 2009 and 2010. The team competed in the 2011–13 America's Cup World Series, but withdrew before the start of the 2013 America's Cup. He was Groupama Sailing Team's coach for the 35th America's Cup.

He has also won the World Match Racing Tour, Stena Match Cup Sweden, One Ton Cup and the Tour de France à la voile.
