= Team Synergy =

Russian yacht racing team

Career
- Established: 2004
- Nation: Russia
- CEO: Maxim Logutenko
- Skipper: Karol Jablonski

Yachts
- Sail no.: Boat name

Team Synergy is a Russian yacht racing team that competes in match racing sailing.

== Early years ==
Established in 2011, Synergy is marked as one of the first gaming organizations created.
