= Mascalzone Latino =

Yacht racing team

- Mascalzone Latino Audi Team

Career
- Yacht club: Club Nautico di Roma
- Established: 2002
- Nation: Italy
- Team principal(s): Vincenzo Onorato
- Skipper: Gavin Brady

Yachts
- Sail no.: Boat name
- ITA–90: ITA 90
- ITA–99: ITA 99

Mascalzone Latino is a yacht racing team that competes in America's Cup style sailing out of the yacht club Club Nautico di Roma.

== 2007 ==
Known as Mascalzone Latino-Capitalia Team and at that time also representing Reale Yacht Club Canottieri Savoia, the team first competed at the Louis Vuitton Cup 2007, the challenger series held prior to the 2007 America's Cup.

== Louis Vuitton Trophy ==
They intended to compete in the Louis Vuitton Pacific Series in 2009 but withdrew due to financial concerns.

The team then became involved in the Louis Vuitton Trophy and provided ITA-90 and ITA-99 for the first event in Nice. Mascalzone Latino will host the third event in La Maddalena, Sardinia in co-operation with the Reale Yacht Club Canottieri Savoia.

== 2010 ==
In February 2010 the team announced it cooperation with German automobile manufacturer and long supporter of sailing activities Audi

== 34th America's Cup ==
On February 15, 2010 Golden Gate Yacht Club announced that they had accepted a challenge from Club Nautico di Roma for the America's Cup. Club Nautico di Roma are the Challenger of Record for the 34th America's Cup and will be represented by their sailing team Mascalzone Latino.

On May 12, 2011, Vincenzo Onorato announced that he was withdrawing Mascalzone Latino from the 34th America's Cup, citing challenges in agreeing with their sponsors on a budget sufficient to fund a competitive team.

== See also ==
- Italy at the America's Cup
