= Royal Thames Yacht Club =

Yacht club in the United Kingdom

Coordinates: 51.5023°N 0.1591°W

- Burgee

- Ensign
- Short name: RTYC
- Founded: 1775; 251 years ago
- Location: 60 Knightsbridge, London, UK
- Website: royalthames.com

The Royal Thames Yacht Club (RTYC) is the oldest continuously operating yacht club in the world, and the oldest yacht club in the United Kingdom. Its headquarters are located at 60 Knightsbridge, London, England, overlooking Hyde Park. The club's purpose is "to provide the members with outstanding yacht cruising, racing and social opportunities in the UK and internationally, building on the club's unique heritage, central London facilities and close reciprocal relationships with other leading yacht clubs around the world."

== History ==
Yachts of the Cumberland Fleet, c. 1815

The RTYC was established in 1775 when Prince Henry, Duke of Cumberland and Strathearn, brother of George III, put up a silver cup for a race on the River Thames and formed the Cumberland Fleet. This remains the alternative name of the club today. The RTYC name originates from 1830 when William IV of the United Kingdom came to the throne. Members of the club initially met in coffee houses. From 1857, the club owned various properties in London, moving to its current location of 60 Knightsbridge in 1923, although the current clubhouse was built more recently.

In 1840, besides the RTYC, there were several other Thames sailing clubs, including the Royal Sailing Society, the Clarence Club, the British Yacht Club, and the Royal Yacht Squadron. RTYC yachting originally took place on the Thames but the Solent became increasingly important in the 1850s as the railways made the south coast more accessible.

The club has had many distinguished Flag Officers and traditionally the Commodore has been a member of the royal family. Louis Mountbatten, 1st Earl Mountbatten of Burma was Commodore for 20 years. The Patron of the club is King Charles III.

In 2019, Jennifer Woods served as the first woman Rear Commodore of the Royal Thames Yacht Club since 1775.

== Activities ==
The club is involved in a range of yachting events for both the cruising and racing yachtsman, motor yacht owners and all those interested in the sea. Through the club's events and other contacts, members have access to yachting activities worldwide. They also have use of all the facilities of the clubhouse in Knightsbridge and leading reciprocal clubs around the world.

=== Racing ===
The club participates in numerous racing events both in the UK and worldwide. There is an annual regatta – the Cumberland Regatta – on the Solent and opportunities for both fleet and match racing. The club is particularly active in keelboat team racing and regularly competes with other leading clubs around the world.

=== Cruising ===
Every year the club organises cruises in UK waters and overseas. Overseas cruises have taken place all over the world from New Zealand to the Caribbean. Some members join in with their own boats while others charter.

=== Social ===
The club hosts a varied range of social events. There are the traditional "Black Tie" events that have been held for over a hundred years, such as the Fitting Out and the Laying Up Dinners, and the annual Prizewinners' Dinner. More recently the club has introduced Ladies Lunches, the Annual Cruising Dinner and the 'Talks at 60 Knightsbridge'.

=== Functions and events ===
The club is licensed for civil marriages and civil partnerships. Non-members may hold private or business functions at the club.

=== Charitable Trust ===
The Royal Thames Yacht Club Charitable Trust provides funding to young people from disadvantaged backgrounds to become members of a working ship's crew and to experience going to sea.

== Gallery ==
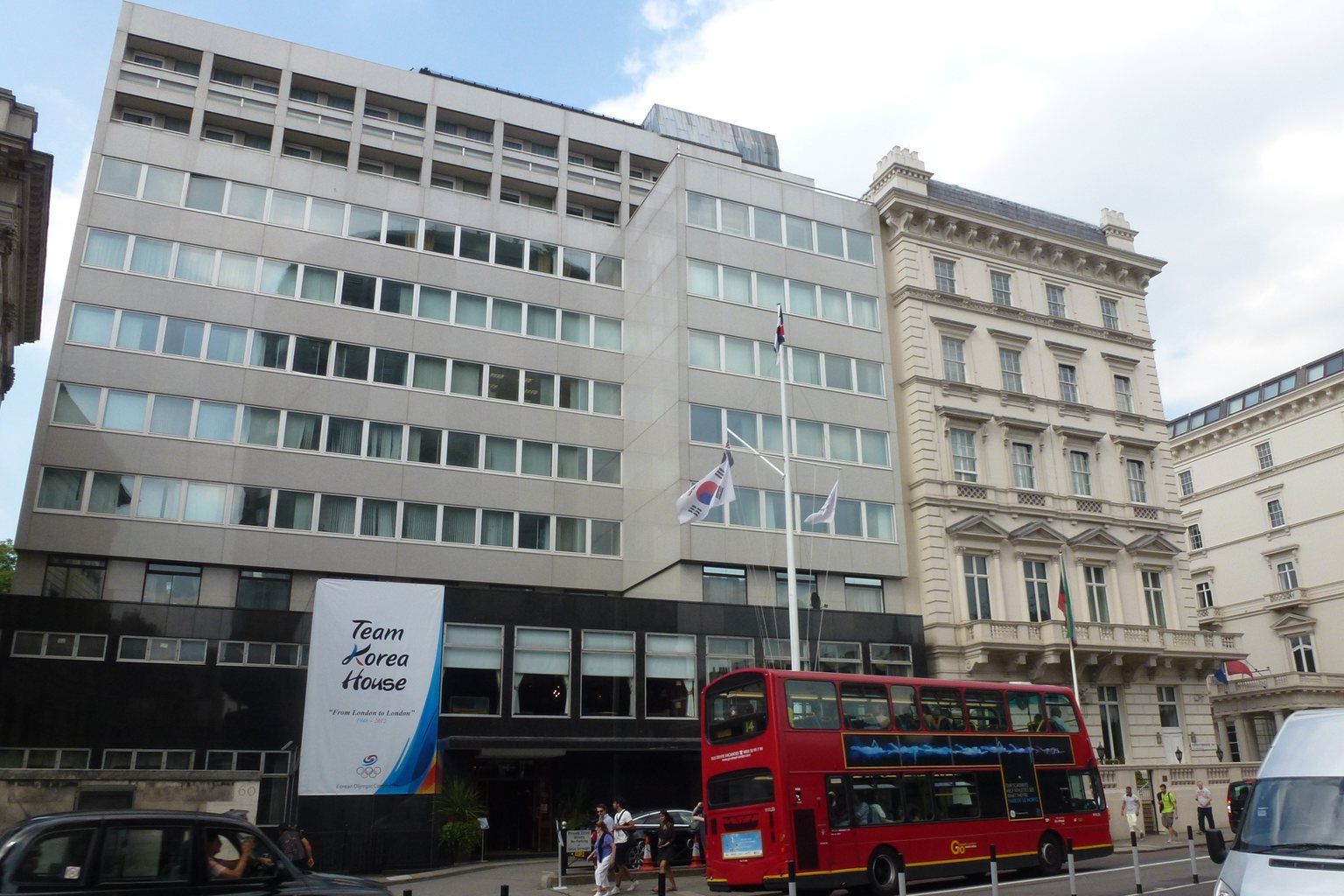
Exterior of the headquarters in August 2012.

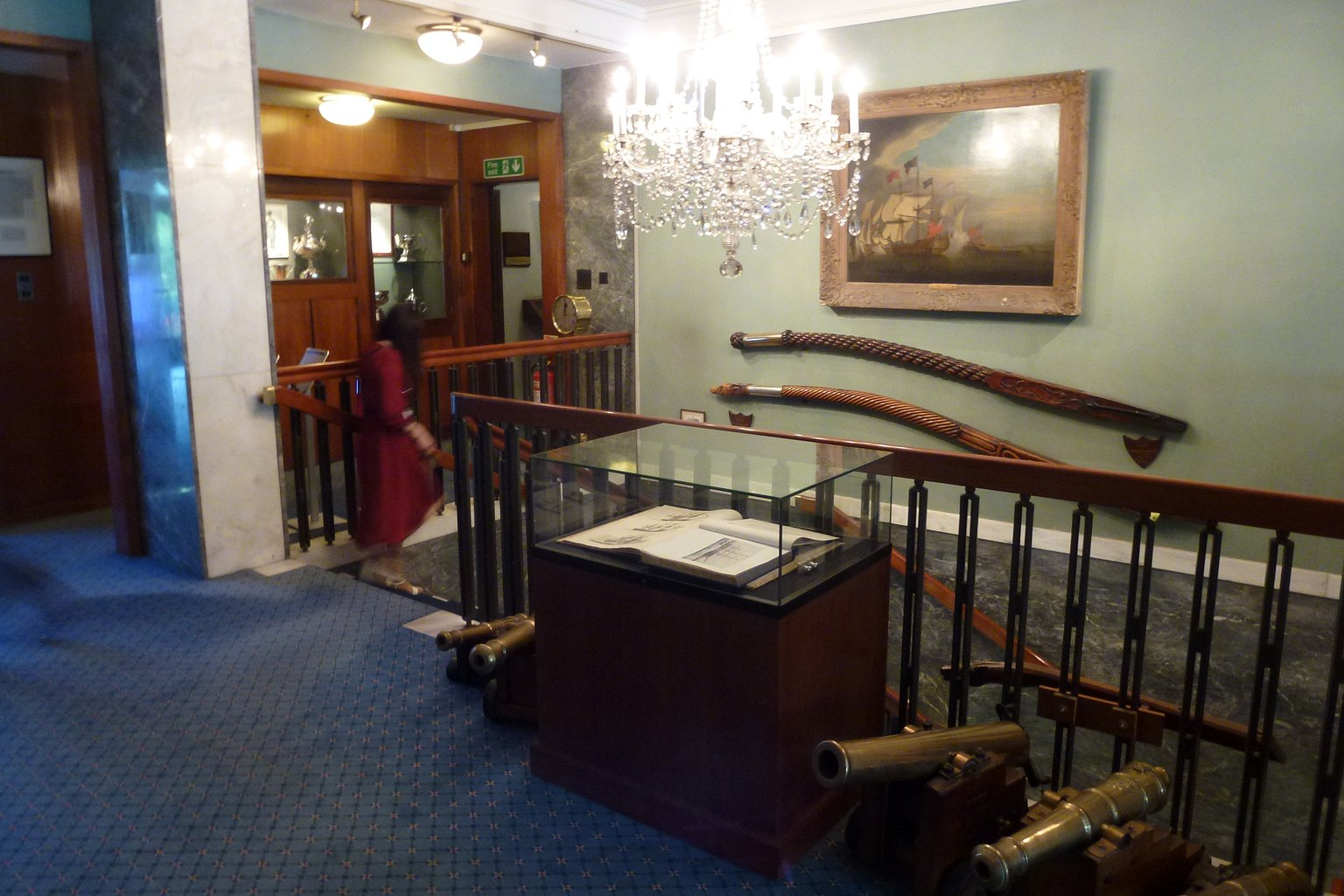
Interior of the headquarters in August 2012.

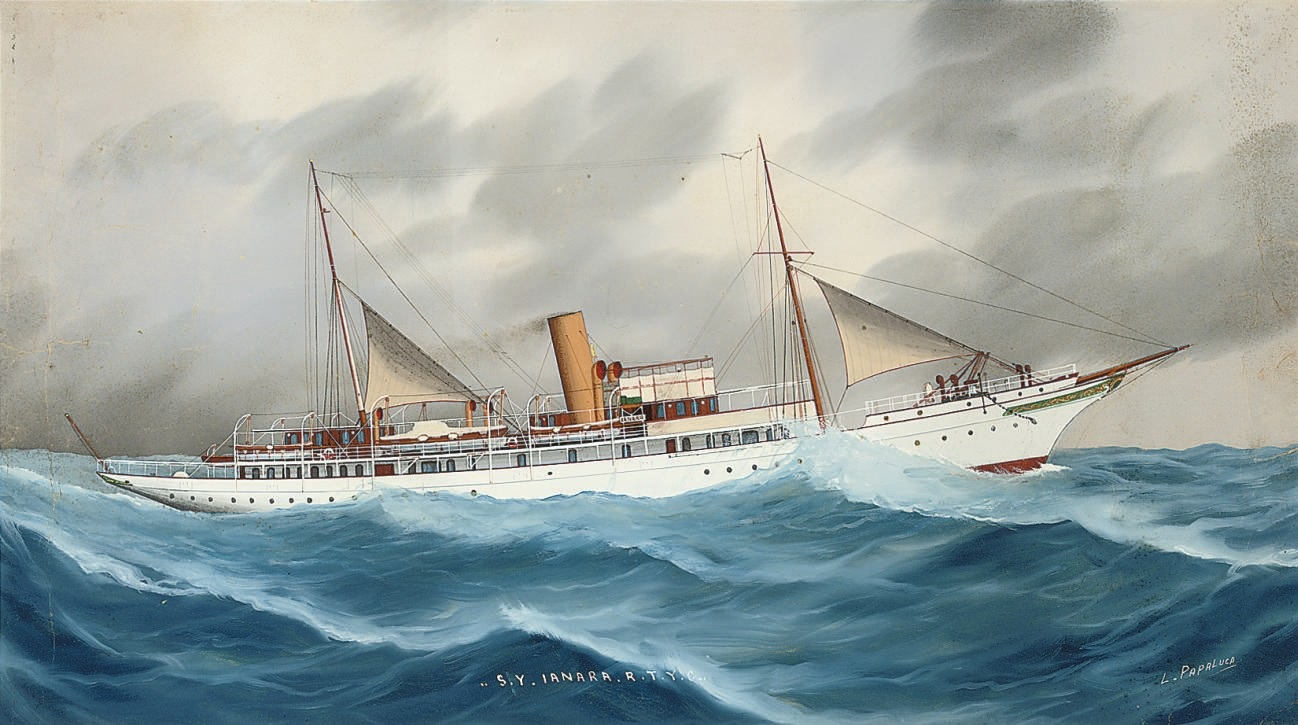
The Royal Thames Yacht Club's steam yacht Ianara painted by Luca Papaluca (1890 - 1934).

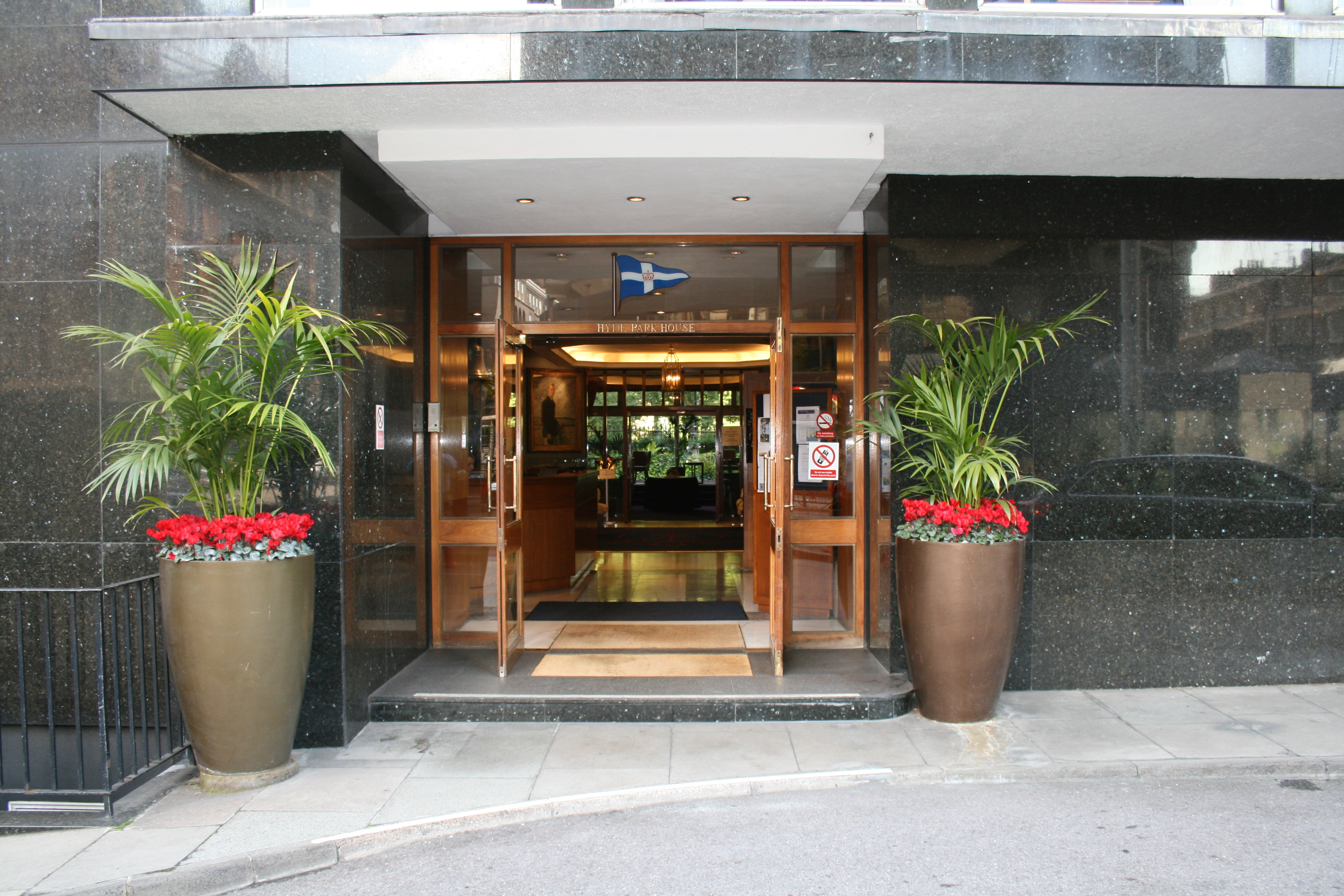
The RTYC entrance

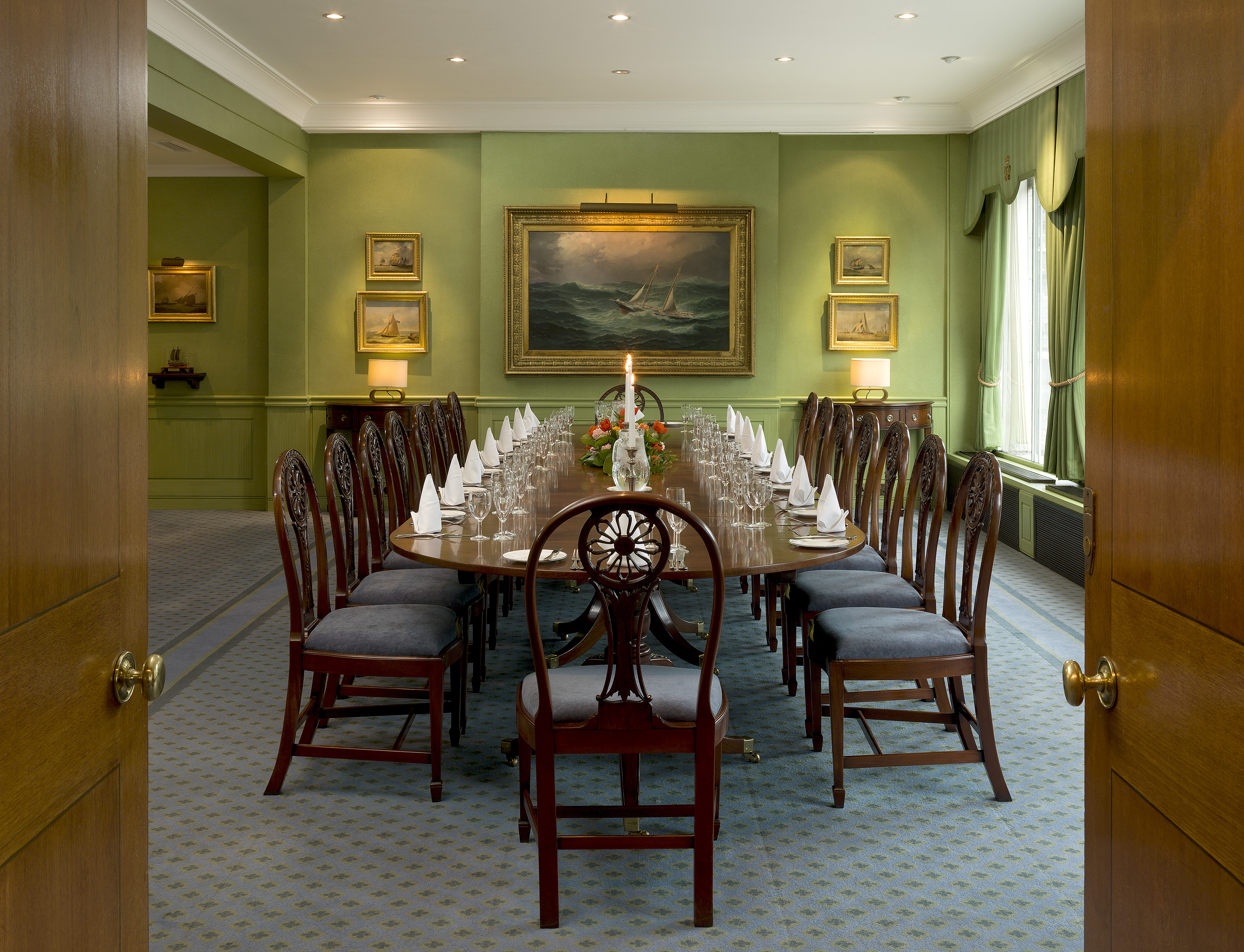
The Edinburgh Room at the RTYC.

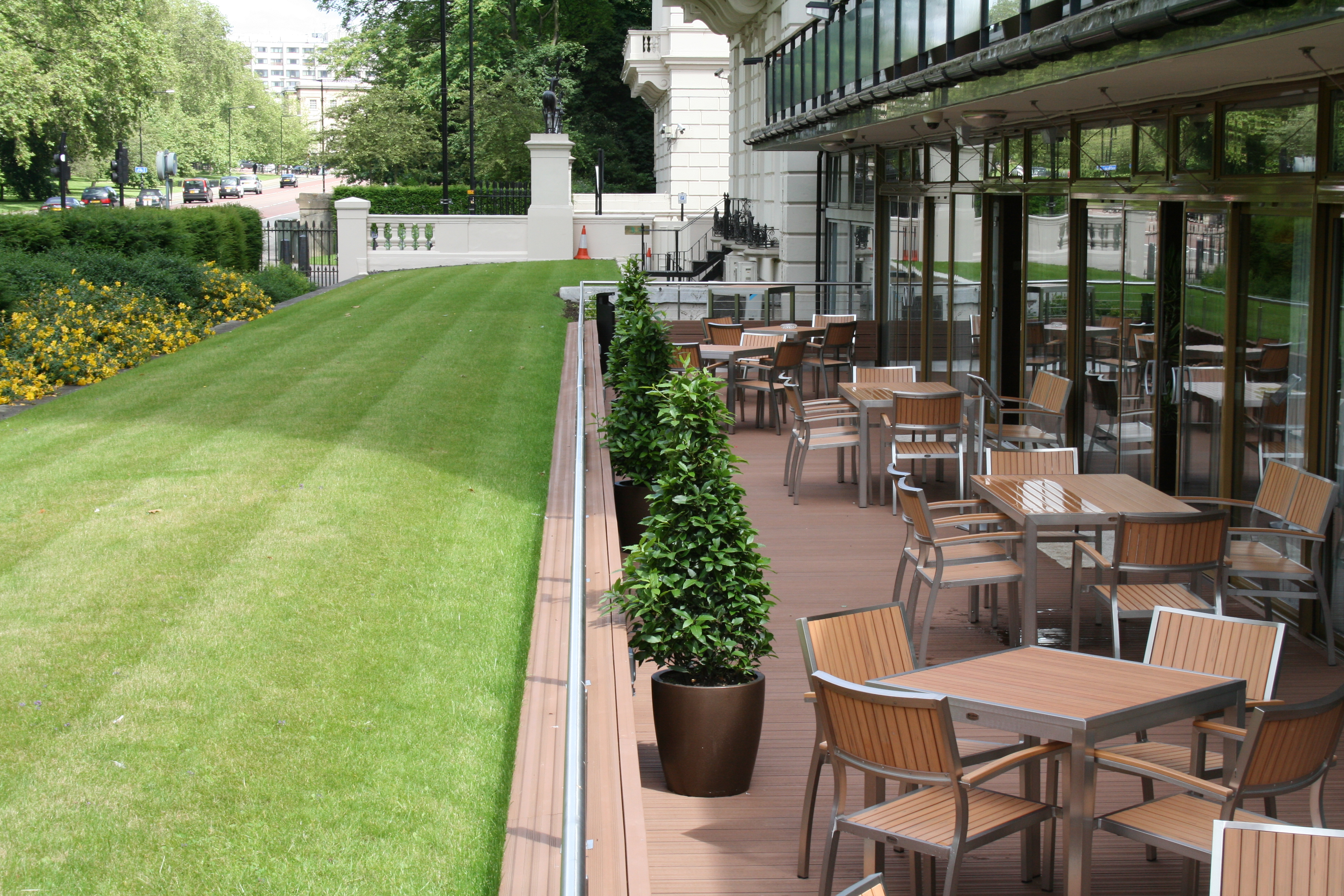
The deck at the Royal Thames Yacht Club.

== See also ==
- List of London's gentlemen's clubs
