= List of America's Cup challengers and defenders =

Detailed list of the finalists of the America's Cup.

| Edit | Year | Defender | Owner Designer Builder Skipper | Defender-Club-Nation | Score | Challenger-Club-Nation | Owner Designer Builder Skipper | Challenger |
|---|---|---|---|---|---|---|---|---|
| Or. | 1851 Cowes | | Thomas Le Marchant; Michael Ratsey; Ratsey Shipyard; Unknown Skipper | Aurora; Royal Yacht Squadron; United Kingdom | Sec-Fi | America; New York Yacht Club; United States | John Cox Stevens syndicate George W. Steers; William H. Brown; Richard Brown | |
| 1 | 1870 New York City | | Franklin Osgood; Richard F. Loper; T. Byerly & Son; Andrew J. Comstock | Magic; New York Yacht Club; United States | Fi-Eig | Cambria; Royal Thames Yacht Club; United Kingdom | James Lloyd Ashbury; Michael E. Ratsey; Ratsey Shipyard; J. Tannock | |
| 2 | 1871 New York City | | Col.: Franklin Osgood; Col.: Joseph B. van Deusen; Col.: van Deusen Shipyard; Col.: Henry N. Comstock | Columbia & Sappho; New York Yacht Club; United States | Co-Li; 2–1; Sa-Li; 2–0 | Livonia; Royal Harwich Yacht Club; United Kingdom | James Lloyd Ashbury; Michael E. Ratsey; Ratsey Shipyard; J. R. Wood | |
| 3 | 1876 New York City | | John Still Dikerson; Jacob B. Voorhis; David Kirby Yard; Josephus Williams | Madeleine; New York Yacht Club; United States | 2–0 | Countess of Dufferin; Royal Canadian Yacht Club; Canada | Charles Gifford; Pat McGiehan; Alexander Cuthbert Shipyard; Alexander Cuthbert | |
| 4 | 1881 New York City | | Joseph Richard Busk; Archibald Cary Smith; Harlan & Hollingsworth Corp. Nathaniel O. Clock | Mischief; New York Yacht Club; United States | 2–0 | Atalanta; Bay of Quinte Yacht Club; Canada | Capt. Alexander Cuthbert; Alexander Cuthbert; Flint & Hunton Lumber Yard; Alexander Cuthbert | |
| 5 | 1885 New York City | | John Malcolm Forbes; Edward Burgess; George Lawley & Son; Aubrey J. Crocker | Puritan; New York Yacht Club; United States | 2–0 | Genesta; Royal Yacht Squadron; United Kingdom | Sir Richard Sutton; John Beavor-Webb; D.&W. Henderson & Co; John Carter | |
| 6 | 1886 New York City | | Charles Jackson Paine; Edward Burgess; George Lawley & Son; Martin V. B. Stone | Mayflower; New York Yacht Club; United States | 2–0 | Galatea; Royal Northern Yacht Club; United Kingdom | Lt. William Henn; John Beavor-Webb; John Reid & Co; William Henn | |
| 7 | 1887 New York City | | Charles Jackson Paine; Edward Burgess; Pusey & Jones Shipyard Co; Henry C. Haff | Volunteer; New York Yacht Club; United States | 2–0 | Thistle; Royal Clyde Yacht Club; United Kingdom | James H. Bell; George Lennox Watson; D.&W. Henderson & Co; John Barr | |
| 8 | 1893 New York City | | Charles Oliver Iselin; Nathanael G. Herreshoff; Herreshoff Manufacturing Co; William Hansen | Vigilant; New York Yacht Club; United States | 3–0 | Valkyrie II; Royal Yacht Squadron; United Kingdom | Earl of Dunraven; George Lennox Watson; D.&W. Henderson & Co; William Cranfield | |
| 9 | 1895 New York City | | William K. Vanderbilt; Nathanael G. Herreshoff; Herreshoff Manufacturing Co; Henry C. Haff | Defender; New York Yacht Club; United States | 3–0 | Valkyrie III; Royal Yacht Squadron; United Kingdom | Earl of Dunraven; George Lennox Watson; D.&W. Henderson & Co; William Cranfield and Edward I Sycamore | |
| 10 | 1899 New York City | | John Pierpont Morgan; Nathanael G. Herreshoff; Herreshoff Manufacturing Co; Charles Barr | Columbia; New York Yacht Club; United States | 3–0 | Shamrock; Royal Ulster Yacht Club; United Kingdom | Sir Thomas Lipton; William Fife III; John I.Thorneycroft & Co; Archie Hogarth | |
| 11 | 1901 New York City | | John Pierpont Morgan; Nathanael G. Herreshoff; Herreshoff Manufacturing Co; Charles Barr | Columbia; New York Yacht Club; United States | 3–0 | Shamrock II; Royal Ulster Yacht Club; United Kingdom | Sir Thomas Lipton; George Lennox Watson; William Denny & Brothers; Edward I. Sycamore | |
| 12 | 1903 New York City | | Cornelius Vanderbilt III; Nathanael G. Herreshoff; Herreshoff Manufacturing Co; Charles Barr | Reliance; New York Yacht Club; United States | 3–0 | Shamrock III; Royal Ulster Yacht Club; United Kingdom | Sir Thomas Lipton; William Fife III; William Denny & Brothers; Robert Wringe | |
| 13 | 1920 New York City | | Henry Walters; Nathanael G. Herreshoff; Herreshoff Manufacturing Co; Charles F. Adams II | Resolute; New York Yacht Club; United States | 3–2 | Shamrock IV; Royal Ulster Yacht Club; United Kingdom | Sir Thomas Lipton; Charles E. Nicholson; Camper & Nicholsons; Albert Turnner | |
| 14 | 1930 Newport | | Harold S. Vanderbilt; W. Starling Burgess; Herreshoff Manufacturing Co; Harold S. Vanderbilt | Enterprise; New York Yacht Club; United States | 4–0 | Shamrock V Royal Ulster Yacht Club; United Kingdom | Sir Thomas Lipton; Charles E. Nicholson; Camper and Nicholsons; Ned Heard | |
| 15 | 1934 Newport | | Harold S. Vanderbilt; W. Starling Burgess; Herreshoff Manufacturing Co; Harold S. Vanderbilt | Rainbow; New York Yacht Club; United States | 4–2 | Endeavour; Royal Yacht Squadron; United Kingdom | Sir Thomas Sopwith; Charles E. Nicholson; Camper & Nicholsons; George Williams | |
| 16 | 1937 Newport | | Harold S. Vanderbilt; W. S. Burgess & O. Stephens; Bath Iron Works; Harold S. Vanderbilt | Ranger; New York Yacht Club; United States | 4–0 | Endeavour II; Royal Yacht Squadron; United Kingdom | Sir Thomas Sopwith; Charles E. Nicholson; Camper & Nicholsons; Thomas O. M. Sopwith | |
| 17 | 1958 Newport | | Henry Sears; Olin Stephens; Nevins Yacht Yard; Briggs Cunningham | Columbia; New York Yacht Club; United States | 3–1 | Sceptre; Royal Yacht Squadron; United Kingdom | Hugh Goodson; David Boyd; Alexander Robertson & Sons; Graham Mann | |
| 18 | 1962 Newport | | Henry D. Mercer; Phillip L. Rhodes; Luders Marine Constr. Co; Emil B. Mosbacher | Weatherly; New York Yacht Club; United States | 4–1 | Gretel; Royal Sydney Yacht Squadron; Australia | Sir Frank Packer; Alan Payne; Lars Halvorsen Sons; Alexander Sturrock | |
| 19 | 1964 Newport | | Eric Ridder; Olin Stephens; Minneford's Yacht Yard; Eric Ridder | Constellation; New York Yacht Club; United States | 3–1 | Sovereign; Royal Thames Yacht Club; United Kingdom | Antony Boyden; David Boyd; Alexander Robertson & Sons; Paul Anderson | |
| 20 | 1967 Newport | | William J. Strawbridge; Olin Stephens; Minneford's Yacht Yard; Emil B. Mosbacher | Intrepid; New York Yacht Club; United States | 4–0 | Dame Pattie; Royal Sydney Yacht Squadron; Australia | Emil Christensen; Warwick Hood; W. H. Barnett Yard; Alexander Sturrock | |
| 21 | 1970 Newport | | William J. Strawbridge; O. Stephens & B. Chance, Jr. Minneford's Yacht Yard; Bill Ficker | Intrepid; New York Yacht Club; United States | 4–1 | Gretel II; Royal Sydney Yacht Squadron; Australia | Sir Frank Packer; Alan Payne; W. H. Barnett Yard; James Hardy | |
| 22 | 1974 Newport | | Robert Willis McCullogh; O. Stephens & D. Pedrick; Minneford's Yacht Yard; Ted Hood | Courageous; New York Yacht Club; United States | 4–0 | Southern Cross; Royal Perth Yacht Club; Australia | Alan Bond; Ben Lexcen; Lars Halvorsen Sons; James Hardy | |
| 23 | 1977 Newport | | King's Point Fund; O. Stephens & D. Pedrick; Minneford's Yacht Yard; Ted Turner | Courageous; New York Yacht Club; United States | 4–0 | Australia; Sun City Yacht Club; Australia | Alan Bond; Ben Lexcen; Steve Ward Yard; Noël Robins | |
| 24 | 1980 Newport | | Edward I. du Moulin; Olin Stephens; Minneford's Yacht Yard; Dennis Conner | Freedom; New York Yacht Club; United States | 4–1 | Australia; Royal Perth Yacht Club; Australia | Alan Bond; Ben Lexcen; Steve Ward Yard; James Hardy | |
| 25 | 1983 Newport | | Edward I. du Moulin; Johan Valentijn; Newport Offshore Ltd; Dennis Conner | Liberty; New York Yacht Club; United States | 3–4 | Australia II; Royal Perth Yacht Club; Australia | Alan Bond; Ben Lexcen; Steve Ward Yard; John E. Bertrand | |
| 26 | 1987 Fremantle | | Kevin Parry Taskforce 87; I. Murray & J. Swarbrick; Parry Boat Builders; Iain Murray | Kookaburra III; Royal Perth Yacht Club; Australia | 0–4 | Stars and Stripes 87; San Diego Yacht Club; United States | Sail America Foundation; B. Chance, Jr., B. Nelson & Pedrick; Derecktor Shipyards; Dennis Conner | |
| 27 | 1988 San Diego | | Sail America Foundation; Morelli, B. Chance, Jr. & Hubbard; R. D. Boatworks; Dennis Conner | Stars and Stripes; San Diego Yacht Club; United States | 2–0 | KZ-1; Mercury Bay Boating Club; New Zealand | New Zealand Challenge; Bruce Farr; Marten Marine; David Barnes | |
| 28 | 1992 San Diego | | America³ Foundation; America³ design team Goetz Custom Sailboats; Bill Koch | America³; San Diego Yacht Club; United States | 4–1 | Il Moro di Venezia V Compagnia della Vela di Venezia; Italy | Il Moro Challenge; Frers, Sena & Hopkins; Tencara Shipyard; Paul Cayard | |
| 29 | 1995 San Diego | | Team Dennis Conner; B. Nelson & J. Kuhn; Goetz Custom Sailboats; Dennis Conner | Young America; San Diego Yacht Club; United States | 0–5 | Black Magic; Royal New Zealand Yacht Squadron; New Zealand | Team New Zealand; TNZ design team McMullen & Wing Yard; Russell Coutts | |
| 30 | 2000 Auckland | | Team New Zealand; TNZ design team TP Cookson Boatbuilders; Russell Coutts | NZL 60; Royal New Zealand Yacht Squadron; New Zealand | 5–0 | Luna Rossa; Yacht Club Punta Ala; Italy | Prada Challenge; Prada Challenge design team Green Marine; Francesco de Angelis | |
| 31 | 2003 Auckland | | Team New Zealand; TNZ design team TP Cookson Boatbuilders; Dean Barker | NZL 82; Royal New Zealand Yacht Squadron; New Zealand | 0–5 | SUI 64; Société Nautique de Genève; Switzerland | Alinghi; Alinghi design team Decision S.A. Russell Coutts | |
| 32 | 2007 Valencia | | Alinghi; Alinghi design team Decision S.A. Brad Butterworth | SUI 100; Société Nautique de Genève; Switzerland | 5–2 | NZL 92; Royal New Zealand Yacht Squadron; New Zealand | Emirates Team New Zealand; ETNZ design team TP Cookson Boatbuilders; Dean Barker | |
| 33 | 2010 Valencia | | Alinghi; Alinghi design team Decision S.A. Ernesto Bertarelli | Alinghi 5 Société Nautique de Genève; Switzerland | 0–2 | USA 17; Golden Gate Yacht Club; United States | BMW Oracle Racing Team; VPLP; Core Builders Composites Anacortes; James Spithill | |
| 34 | 2013 San Francisco | | Oracle Team USA; Oracle Team USA design team Oracle Team USA build team James Spithill | Oracle Team USA 17; Golden Gate Yacht Club; United States | 9–8 | Aotearoa; Royal New Zealand Yacht Squadron; New Zealand | Emirates Team New Zealand; ETNZ design team TP Cookson Boatbuilders; Dean Barker | |
| 35 | 2017 Bermuda | | Oracle Team USA; Oracle Team USA design team Oracle Team USA build team James Spithill | 17; Golden Gate Yacht Club; United States | 1–7 | Aotearoa; Royal New Zealand Yacht Squadron; New Zealand | Emirates Team New Zealand; ETNZ design team Southern Spars; Glenn Ashby | |
| 36 | 2021 Auckland | | Emirates Team New Zealand; ETNZ design team ETNZ build team Peter Burling | Te Rehutai; Royal New Zealand Yacht Squadron; New Zealand | 7–3 | Luna Rossa; Circolo della Vela Sicilia; Italy | Luna Rossa Prada Pirelli; Luna Rossa design team Persico Marine; Max Sirena | |
| 37 | 2024 Barcelona | | Emirates Team New Zealand; ETNZ design team ETNZ build team Peter Burling | Taihoro; Royal New Zealand Yacht Squadron; New Zealand | 7–2 | Britannia; Royal Yacht Squadron; United Kingdom | INEOS Britannia Carrington Boats; Sir Ben Ainslie | |

== See also ==
- America's Cup
- Defender (America's Cup)
- Challenger (America's Cup)
