= Defender (America's Cup) =

Team that has been challenged by another to return the trophy

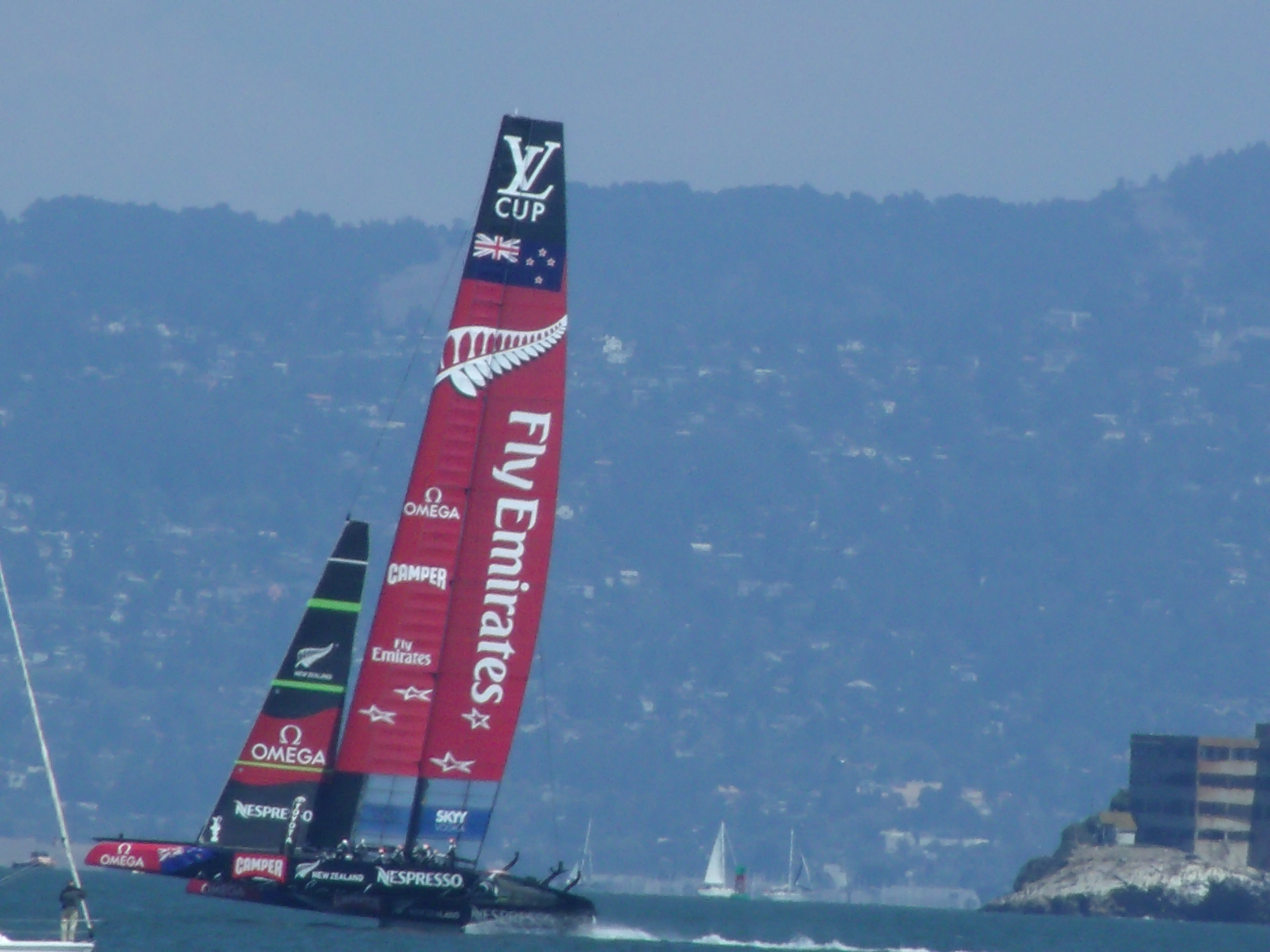
Emirates Team New Zealand (2021 defender syndicate) in 2013.

The Defender in the America's Cup sailing competition is the team that holds the trophy and has been challenged by another union for the title return.

== Defenders ==
Winner of the America's Cup

Year	Venue	Defending club	Defender
1851	Isle of Wight	(United Kingdom) Royal Yacht Squadron	8 cutters and 7 schooners, runner-up Aurora
1870	New York City	(United States) New York Yacht Club	17 schooners, winner Franklin Osgood's Magic
1871	New York City	(United States) New York Yacht Club	Franklin Osgood, Columbia (2–1) and William Proctor Douglas, Sappho (2–0)
1876	New York City	(United States) New York Yacht Club	John Stiles Dickerson, Madeleine
1881	New York City	(United States) New York Yacht Club	Joseph Richard Busk, Mischief
1885	New York City	(United States) New York Yacht Club	John Malcolm Forbes syndicate, Puritan
1886	New York City	(United States) New York Yacht Club	Charles Jackson Paine, Mayflower
1887	New York City	(United States) New York Yacht Club	Charles Jackson Paine, Volunteer
1893	New York City	(United States) New York Yacht Club	Charles Oliver Iselin syndicate, Vigilant
1895	New York City	(United States) New York Yacht Club	William K. Vanderbilt syndicate, Defender
1899	New York City	(United States) New York Yacht Club	J. Pierpont Morgan syndicate, Columbia
1901	New York City	(United States) New York Yacht Club	J. Pierpont Morgan syndicate, Columbia
1903	New York City	(United States) New York Yacht Club	Cornelius Vanderbilt III syndicate, Reliance
1920	New York City	(United States) New York Yacht Club	Henry Walters syndicate, Resolute
1930	Newport	(United States) New York Yacht Club	Harold S. Vanderbilt syndicate, Enterprise
1934	Newport	(United States) New York Yacht Club	Harold S. Vanderbilt syndicate, Rainbow
1937	Newport	(United States) New York Yacht Club	Harold S. Vanderbilt, Ranger
1958	Newport	(United States) New York Yacht Club	Henry Sears, Columbia
1962	Newport	(United States) New York Yacht Club	Mercer, Walsh, Frese syndicate, Weatherly
1964	Newport	(United States) New York Yacht Club	Eric Ridder syndicate, Constellation
1967	Newport	(United States) New York Yacht Club	William Justice Strawbridge syndicate, Intrepid
1970	Newport	(United States) New York Yacht Club	William Justice Strawbridge syndicate, Intrepid
1974	Newport	(United States) New York Yacht Club	Robert Willis McCullough syndicate, Courageous
1977	Newport	(United States) New York Yacht Club	Ted Turner, Courageous
1980	Newport	(United States) New York Yacht Club	Freedom syndicate, Freedom
1983	Newport	(United States) New York Yacht Club	Freedom syndicate, Liberty
1987	Fremantle	(Australia) Royal Perth Yacht Club	Kevin Parry, Kookaburra III
1988	San Diego	(United States) San Diego Yacht Club	Sail America, Stars & Stripes 88
1992	San Diego	(United States) San Diego Yacht Club	Bill Koch, America^{3}
1995	San Diego	(United States) San Diego Yacht Club	Sail America, Young America
2000	Auckland	Royal New Zealand Yacht Squadron	Team New Zealand, NZL-60
2003	Auckland	Royal New Zealand Yacht Squadron	Team New Zealand, NZL 82
2007	Valencia	(Switzerland) Société Nautique de Genève	Alinghi, SUI-100
2010	Valencia	(Switzerland) Société Nautique de Genève	Alinghi, Alinghi 5
2013	San Francisco	(United States) Golden Gate Yacht Club	Oracle Team USA, Oracle Team USA 17
2017	Bermuda	(United States) Golden Gate Yacht Club	Oracle Team USA, 17
2021	Auckland	Royal New Zealand Yacht Squadron	Emirates Team New Zealand, Te Rehutai
2024	Barcelona	Royal New Zealand Yacht Squadron	Emirates Team New Zealand, Taihoro
2027	Naples	Royal New Zealand Yacht Squadron	Emirates Team New Zealand, TBA

== See also ==
- America's Cup
- Challenger (America's Cup)
- List of America's Cup challengers and defenders
