= Challenger (America's Cup) =

Sailing competition

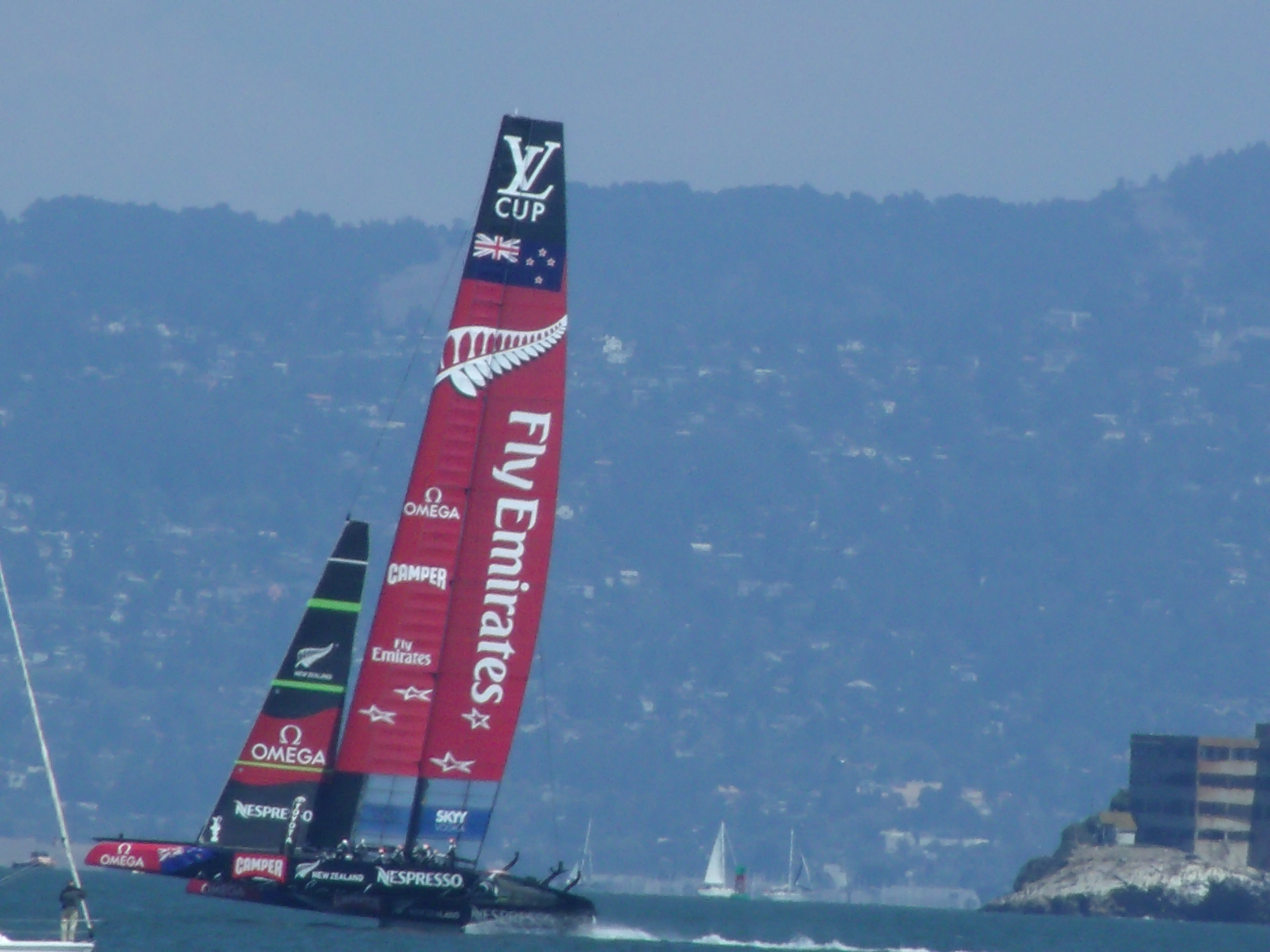
Emirates Team New Zealand, the challenger syndicate in 2013

The Challenger in the America's Cup sailing competition is the team that challenges the defender to win the trophy.

== Challengers ==
Only seven times in America's Cup history has a challenger syndicate won the trophy.

Winner of the America's Cup

Year	Venue	Challenger	Challenging club	Challenger Selection Series
1851	Isle of Wight	John Cox Stevens syndicate, America	(United States) New York Yacht Club	not held
1870	New York City	James Lloyd Ashbury, Cambria	(United Kingdom) Royal Thames Yacht Club	not held
1871	New York City	James Lloyd Ashbury, Livonia	(United Kingdom) Royal Harwich Yacht Club	not held
1876	New York City	Charles Gifford, Countess of Dufferin	(Canada) Royal Canadian Yacht Club	not held
1881	New York City	Alexander Cuthbert, Atalanta	(Canada) Bay of Quinte Yacht Club	not held
1885	New York City	Sir Richard Sutton, Genesta	(United Kingdom) Royal Yacht Squadron	not held
1886	New York City	Lt. & Mrs. William Henn, Galatea	(United Kingdom) Royal Northern Yacht Club	not held
1887	New York City	James Bell syndicate, Thistle	(United Kingdom) Royal Clyde Yacht Club	not held
1893	New York City	Earl of Dunraven, Valkyrie II	(United Kingdom) Royal Yacht Squadron	not held
1895	New York City	Earl of Dunraven syndicate, Valkyrie III	(United Kingdom) Royal Yacht Squadron	not held
1899	New York City	Sir Thomas Lipton, Shamrock	(United Kingdom) Royal Ulster Yacht Club	not held
1901	New York City	Sir Thomas Lipton, Shamrock II	(United Kingdom) Royal Ulster Yacht Club	not held
1903	New York City	Sir Thomas Lipton, Shamrock III	(United Kingdom) Royal Ulster Yacht Club	not held
1920	New York City	Sir Thomas Lipton, Shamrock IV	(United Kingdom) Royal Ulster Yacht Club	not held
1930	Newport	Sir Thomas Lipton, Shamrock V	(United Kingdom) Royal Ulster Yacht Club	not held
1934	Newport	Sir Thomas Sopwith, Endeavour	(United Kingdom) Royal Yacht Squadron	not held
1937	Newport	Sir Thomas Sopwith, Endeavour II	(United Kingdom) Royal Yacht Squadron	not held
1958	Newport	Hugh Goodson syndicate, Sceptre	(United Kingdom) Royal Yacht Squadron	not held
1962	Newport	Sir Frank Packer, Gretel	(Australia) Royal Sydney Yacht Squadron	not held
1964	Newport	Anthony Boyden, Sovereign	(United Kingdom) Royal Thames Yacht Club	not held
1967	Newport	Emil Christensen, Dame Pattie	(Australia) Royal Sydney Yacht Squadron	not held
1970	Newport	Sir Frank Packer, Gretel II	(Australia) Royal Sydney Yacht Squadron	1970 Herbert Pell Cup
1974	Newport	Alan Bond, Southern Cross	(Australia) Royal Perth Yacht Club	1974 Herbert Pell Cup
1977	Newport	Alan Bond, Australia	(Australia) Sun City Yacht Club	1977 Herbert Pell Cup
1980	Newport	Alan Bond, Australia	(Australia) Royal Perth Yacht Club	1980 Herbert Pell Cup
1983	Newport	Alan Bond, Australia II	(Australia) Royal Perth Yacht Club	1983 Louis Vuitton Cup 1983 Herbert Pell Cup
1987	Fremantle	Sail America, Stars & Stripes 87	(United States) San Diego Yacht Club 1987 Louis Vuitton Cup 1987 Herbert Pell Cup	
1988	San Diego	Fay Richwhite, KZ-1	(New Zealand) Mercury Bay Boating Club	not held
1992	San Diego	Raul Gardini, Il Moro di Venezia	(Italy) Compagnia della Vela di Venezia	1992 Louis Vuitton Cup 1992 Herbert Pell Cup
1995	San Diego	Team New Zealand, NZL-32/Black Magic	Royal New Zealand Yacht Squadron	1995 Louis Vuitton Cup 1995 Herbert Pell Cup
2000	Auckland	Prada Challenge, Luna Rossa	(Italy) Yacht Club Punta Ala	2000 Louis Vuitton Cup 2000 Herbert Pell Cup
2003	Auckland	Alinghi, SUI-64	(Switzerland) Société Nautique de Genève	2003 Louis Vuitton Cup 2003 Herbert Pell Cup
2007	Valencia	Team New Zealand, NZL-92	Royal New Zealand Yacht Squadron	2007 Louis Vuitton Cup 2007 Herbert Pell Cup
2010	Valencia	BMW Oracle Racing, USA-17	(United States) Golden Gate Yacht Club	not held
2013	San Francisco	Team New Zealand, Aotearoa	Royal New Zealand Yacht Squadron	2013 Louis Vuitton Cup 2013 Herbert Pell Cup
2017	Bermuda	Team New Zealand, Aotearoa	Royal New Zealand Yacht Squadron	2017 Louis Vuitton Cup 2017 Herbert Pell Cup
2021	Auckland	Luna Rossa Prada Pirelli	(Italy) Circolo della Vela Sicilia	2021 Prada Cup 2021 Herbert Pell Cup
2024	Barcelona	INEOS Britannia	(United Kingdom) Royal Yacht Squadron	2024 Louis Vuitton Cup 2024 Herbert Pell Cup

== See also ==
- America's Cup
- Defender (America's Cup)
- List of America's Cup challengers and defenders
- Herbert Pell Cup
