= Challenger Selection Series =

Challenger Selection Series is the sailing competition that awards the title of Challenger in the America's Cup, may refer to:

- Herbert Pell Cup (1958-1980)
- Louis Vuitton Cup (1983-2017)
- Prada Cup (2021-)
