= 1886 America's Cup =

Yacht race

7th America's Cup
Defender USA
- Defender club: New York Yacht Club
- Yacht: Mayflower

Challenger Great Britain
- Challenger club: Royal Northern Yacht Club
- Yacht: Galatea

Competition
- Location: New York City
- Dates: 7-11 September 1886
- Rule: NYYC 85ft
- Winner: New York Yacht Club
- Score: (United States) 2 (United Kingdom) 0

The 1886 America's Cup was the 7th staging of the America's Cup yacht race. It was contested as a three-match-race series in New York City, New York, United States between Mayflower owned by Gen. Charles Paine, representing the defender, the New York Yacht Club; and Galatea owned by Lieut. & Mrs. William Henn, representing the Royal Northern Yacht Club. It was the first time a Scottish club challenged the America's Cup.

At the conclusion of the races of Puritan and Genesta, the NYYC took up the challenge of Lieut. Henn of the Galatea, a meeting held October 22, 1885, definitely accepted it, fixing the races for the following year. The conditions arranged for the races were similar to those in the series of the previous year. The course chosen for the first race was the regular one of the NYYC starting from buoy 18, New York harbour, and the same as the one sailed over by the Puritan and Genesta in the "inside" race of 1885.

Henn and his cutter remained in this country until after the races with the Thistle the following year, 1887, and made many friends here.

== Results ==
=== The First Race (Tues, 7 Sep) - 36 miles ===
Despite a 1-second early disadvantage at the start line the Mayflower made considerable gains over the course and finished at 5:26:41 (corrected time) with a lead of 1.5 miles over Galatea who finished at 5:39:21 (corrected time).

=== The Second Day Abandoned (Thurs, 9 Sep) ===
Racing started but abandoned due to fog.

=== The Second Race (Sat, 11 Sep) ===
Mayflower led throughout the race, finishing at 6:49:00 (corrected time) compared to Galatea who finished at 7:18:09 (corrected time).

Though beaten fairly, Henn felt that the weather was not suited to his boat and he challenged Mayflower to a race off Marblehead in a real breeze. Paine accepted and agreed to keep his boat in commission for the race until a certain date. The boats remained at Marblehead waiting for a breeze for 10 days by which point the American decided to hoist his boat out. The following spring with Galatea still in the country, a race was sailed between the two and Mayflower won easily.
