= 1881 America's Cup =

Yacht race

5th America's Cup
Defender USA
- Defender club: New York Yacht Club
- Yacht: Mischief

Challenger Canada
- Challenger club: Bay of Quinte Yacht Club
- Yacht: Atlanta

Competition
- Location: New York City
- Dates: TBD
- Rule: 65ft Sloop
- Winner: New York Yacht Club
- Score: (United States) 2 (Canada) 0

The 1881 America's Cup was the 5th staging of the America's Cup yacht race. It was contested as a series in New York City, New York, United States between Mischief owned by Jospeph Richard Busk, representing the defender, the New York Yacht Club (NYYC); and Atlanta owned by Alexander Cuthbert, representing the Bay of Quinte Yacht Club. It was the second and final time a Canadian club has challenged the America’s Cup.

== Results ==
Mischief won the two-race series.
