= Bay of Quinte (disambiguation) =

Bay of Quinte is a bay on the northern shore of Lake Ontario.

Bay of Quinte may also refer to:

- Bay of Quinte (federal electoral district)
- Bay of Quinte (provincial electoral district)
- Bay of Quinte Mohawk
- Bay of Quinte Railway
- Bay of Quinte Skyway
- Bay of Quinte Yacht Club
