= 1895 America's Cup =

10th America's Cup
Defender USA
- Defender club: New York Yacht Club
- Yacht: Defender

Challenger Great Britain
- Challenger club: Royal Yacht Squadron
- Yacht: Valkyrie III

Competition
- Location: off Sandy Hook Lightship, Lower New York Bay
- Dates: 7–12 September 1895
- Rule: the Seawanhaka Rule
- Winner: New York Yacht Club
- Score: (United States) 3 (United Kingdom) 0

The 1895 America's Cup was the 10th staging of the America's Cup and occurred just two years after the 1893 America's Cup yet again pitting the New York Yacht Club against the Royal Yacht Squadron in a best-of-three-match--race-series. The 1895 race was between the Herreshoff designed sloop Defender owned by the William K. Vanderbilt syndicate, and the Watson designed Valkyrie III owned by Earl of Dunraven of the Royal Yacht Squadron.

== The Challenge ==
In the Autumn of 1894 Lord Dunraven opened correspondence about another challenge of the Cup (his first letter was dated 24 October). Dunraven desired that the challenge terms remain as they were for his previous challenge with the difference that:

- Both yachts were to be measured with all weights on board and their water lines marked.
- All races on the windward and leeward courses were to be started windward
- All races were to be sailed off Marblehead, as offering a clearer course than off Sandy Hook
- He be given the right to come in the fastest British vessel, providing his challenger was found not to be the fastest

The NYYC replied on 15 November informing Dunraven that the vessels would be measured in the manner specified and he could substitute another vessel for his challenger by providing a second challenge upon the withdrawal of the first. His other stipulations were dismissed as "impractical".

== The races ==
Before racing the boats were measured by John Hyslop.

The conditions to govern the races were signed on 4 September by James D. Smith (chairmen of the NYYC America's Cup committee) and Dunraven.

- The contest was to be decided by the winning of three races out of five.
- The starts to be from Sandy Hook light-vessel
- The first, third and fifth races to be to windward and leeward, the second and fourth over a triangle, all courses to be 30 miles, and laid to windward when possible
- Starting signals to be given at 11 o'clock, and delayed only in event of changing the starting-point, fog, or agreed postponement; preparatory gun to be fired 10 minutes before starting signal, and handicap gun two minutes after
- Time limit for races of six hours
- All length over 89 feet load water-line to count double in figuring racing length for time allowance
- Vessels to be allowed time for repairs in case of accident
- Yachts to be measured with all weights on board to be carried in a race, restrictions as to bulkheads, floors, doors, water-tanks and anchor being waived.

=== First race ===
The first race, on September 7, 1895, was set to be a windward-leeward course of fifteen miles length. The Weather for the day was described as light and shifting wind. In the first leg of the course the racing was close with Defender taking a slight lead by the windward mark. After rounding the mark the wind shifted, turning the running leg into a reaching leg, as a result Defender quickly increased its lead against Valkyrie III. Defender crossed the line eight minutes and forty-nine seconds ahead of "Valkyrie III" to win the first race.

=== Second race ===
The second race occurred on Tuesday September 10, 1895. The race was set as a triangle course with each leg having a length of ten miles. In the pre-start maneuvering, Valkyrie III's boom struck Defender, severing the starboard spreader. Valkyrie III led throughout the race, although Defender closed the gap between the boats in the second and third legs of the race. Valkyrie III crossed the line forty-seven seconds before Defender. However, after hearing the protest from Defender against Valkyrie III, the Race Committee awarded Defender the race as it ruled Defender had right of way over Valkyrie III as Defender was leeward of Valkyrie III at the time of collision.

=== Third race ===
The third race was sailed on Thursday September 12, 1895. After both Defender and Valkyrie III crossed the starting line sailing before the wind, Valkyrie III withdrew from the race claiming the committee could not guarantee a course that was free of spectator craft. Defender completed the race, winning the best of five regatta.
