= Lewis Blix =

Yacht racing expert

Lewis N. Blix (November 5, 1862 – January 14, 1934) was a yacht racing expert, and at one time was the racing master of the New York Yacht Club. He laid out the courses for all the America's Cup races from 1900 until the 1920 race. He was involved in marine salvage work, having overseen the raising of the Washington Irving and coal salvage work in Narragansett Bay in 1922 during the coal shortage that year, locating 12 coal barges that had been sunk in the bay during winter storms. He died of heart disease and was survived by one son and six daughters.
