= 1901 America's Cup =

11th America's Cup
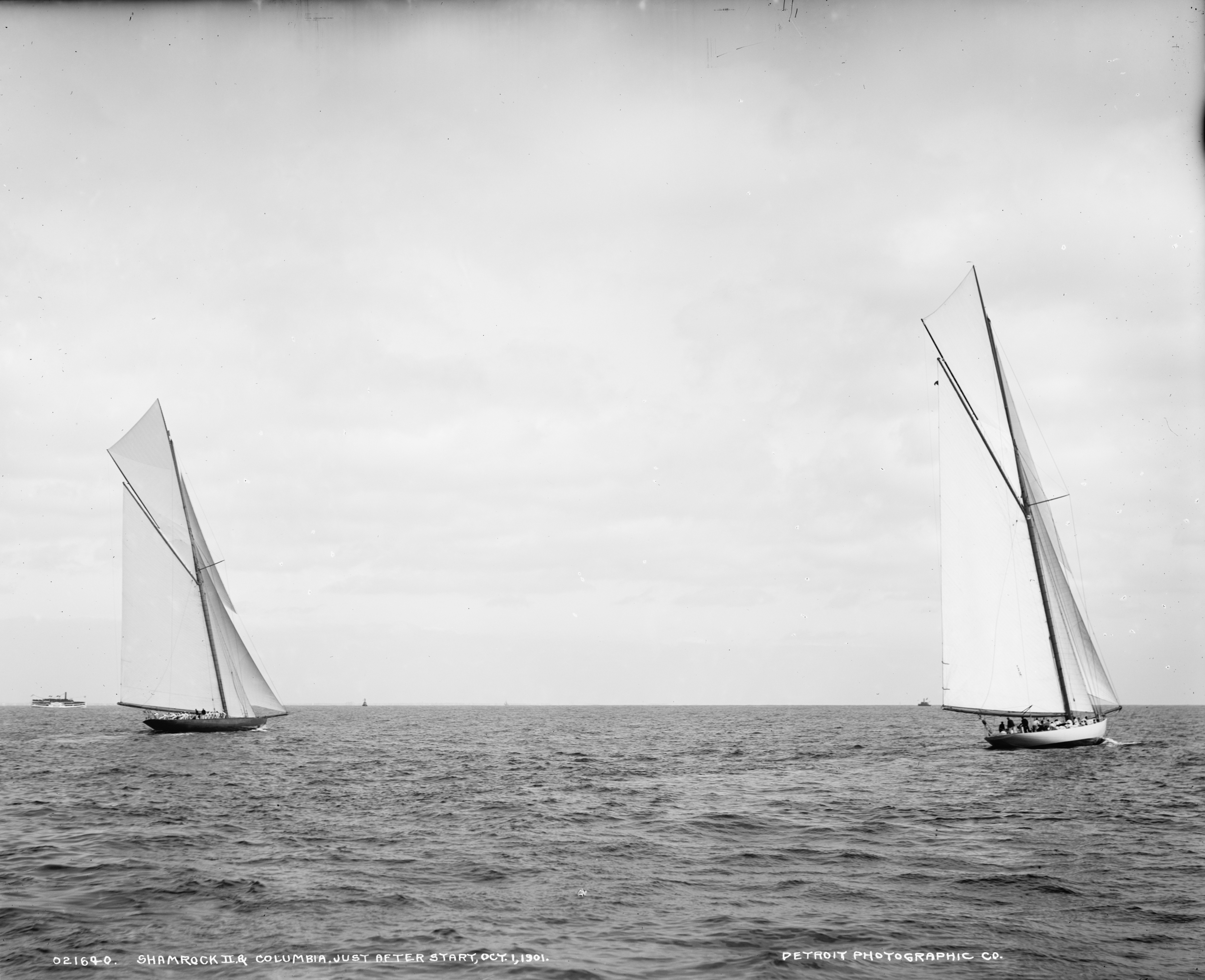
- Columbia, the defender, and Shamrock II

Defender United States
- Defender club: New York Yacht Club
- Yacht: Columbia

Challenger United Kingdom
- Challenger club: Royal Ulster Yacht Club
- Yacht: Shamrock II

Competition
- Location: New York Harbor
- 40°40′N 74°02′W
- Dates: 1901
- Rule: Seawanhaka
- Winner: New York Yacht Club
- Score: 3–0

The 1901 America's Cup was the 11th challenge for the Cup. It took place in the New York City harbor and consisted of a best of five series of races between the defender Columbia, entered by the New York Yacht Club for the second time, and Sir Thomas Lipton's Shamrock II, representing the Royal Ulster Yacht Club. Columbia won all three races, the last being won with handicap, defending the cup.

The course for the race was laid out by Lewis Blix.
