= Madeleine (yacht) =

Schooner Yacht

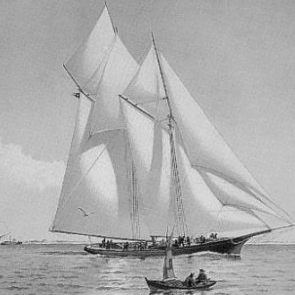
- Schooner Yacht Madeleine.

History

United States
- Name: Madeleine
- Owner: Jacob B. Voorhis (1868-1875); John S. Dickerson (1875-1900)
- Operator: Josephus Williams & David Snediker
- Builder: David Kurby, Rye, New York
- Launched: 28 Mar 1869
- Out of service: August 5, 1900
- Home port: New York City
- Honors and awards: Winner of the America’s Cup, 1876
- Fate: Sank

General characteristics
- Class & type: Schooner
- Type: Centerboard schooner-yacht
- Displacement: 151.5-tons
- Length: 95 ft 0 in (28.96 m)
- Beam: 24 ft 0 in (7.32 m)
- Draught: 7 ft 3 in (2.21 m)
- Depth: 7 ft 7 in (2.31 m)
- Propulsion: schooner sail
- Sail plan: 3,824 sq ft (355.3 m^{2}) sail area in cubic feet; 22 ft 40 in (7.72 m) Foremast; 18 ft 70 in (7.26 m) Bowsprit

The Madeleine was a 19th-century racing schooner-yacht built in 1868 by David Kurby in Rye, New York and owned by Commodore Jacob B. Voorhis. Madeleine was the winner of the America's Cup in 1876 and an American defender in the 1870 America's Cup. She won the two most desired trophies reserved for schooners, the Bennett and the Douglas Cups. In 1911, the Madeleine was dismantled and sunk at the mouth of the Hillsborough River, Florida.

== Construction and service ==
The Madeleine was a wood centerboard schooner-rigged racing yacht built in 1868 by David Kirby in Rye, New York. She was owned by yachtsman Commodore Jacob B. Voorhis Jr., and later purchased by John S. Dickerson. Her home port was New York City.

Madeleine was launched on March 28, 1869, at Rye from the shipyard of David Kirby, who was the same builder that modeled the Addie V. She was 151-tons and owned by Jacob B. Voorhis Jr., of the Brooklyn Yacht Club.

Commodore Jacob B. Voorhis converted the sloop Madeleine into a schooner so he could compete with schooners for the champion schooner pennant.

== Yachting races ==
=== 1870 Atlantic Yacht Club race ===
On June 17, 1870, Voorhis raced against the Mystic and the Addie V. The 30 mile course was from the Atlantic Yacht Club and Brooklyn Yacht Clubs at Gowanus Bay, to the S.W. Split, passing it and back. The Madeleine won the race in four hours and seven minutes.

=== 1870 America's Cup ===
On August 8, 1870, the international 1870 America's Cup was the first America's Cup to be hosted in the United States at New York Harbor. Jacob B. Voorhis with his American schooner Madeleine was in the competition. The course started from the Staten Island N.Y.Y.C anchorage down through the Narrows to the S.W. Split buoy, across to the Sandy Hook lightship and return to Staten Island. The race was won by the Franklin Osgood's Magic with the Madeleine finishing in 13th place.

=== 1870 Douglas Cup ===
In September 1870, the Madeleine was in the New York Yacht Club regatta was held for the Douglas Cup. She ran against the Idler, Dauntless,Cambria, Tidal Wave and other yachts. The Dauntless, Tidal Wave and Madeleine were the winners.

=== 1871 Brooklyn Yacht Club regatta ===
In June 1871, Madeleine was in the annual Brooklyn Yacht Club regatta. She raced against the Phantom, Columbia, Idler, Dauntless, Fleetwing, Saapho and other schooners and sloops. James Gordon Bennett Jr. provided the winning prizes. The course was from the stakeboat off Bay Ridged to the Southwest Split, then across to the Sandy Hook Lightship and back. The Madeleine came in 1st place with her time allowance at 4hr. 38min, and 29 secs. The Dauntless won without time allowance at 4hr. 35min, and 58 secs.

Voorhis made alterations his Madeleine in 1871 with John E. Smith at his shipyard in Nyack, New York. She was altered again in 1873 and 1875. Her hull was lengthened by 5.2 meters and the freeboard was increased by 35 centimeters. Each alteration contributed to Madeleine's speed.

=== 1873 New York Yacht Club regatta ===
In June 1873, Madeleine made the fastest time on record in the annual regatta of the New York Yacht Club. She raced against the Idler, Resolute, Madgie and other schooners. The course was down to the Southwest Split around the Sandy Hook Lightship and back. The Madeleine winning time was 4 hours and 1 minute, and twenty seconds. The Idler was the second prize.

=== 1873 Bennett cup ===
On August 2, 1873, the Madeleine won the Bennett Cup, presented by James G. Bennett. The course was from Ford Adams to the Block Island buoy and back. The Madeleine won with a new record of 3 hours, 23 minutes and 23 seconds. She ran against the Idler, Alarm, Tidal Wave and other schooners.

In January 1875, Commodore John S. Dickerson purchased the Madeleine from Jacob B. Voorhis. She still carried the blue pennant of the Commodore of the Brooklyn Yacht Club.

=== 1876 America's cup ===
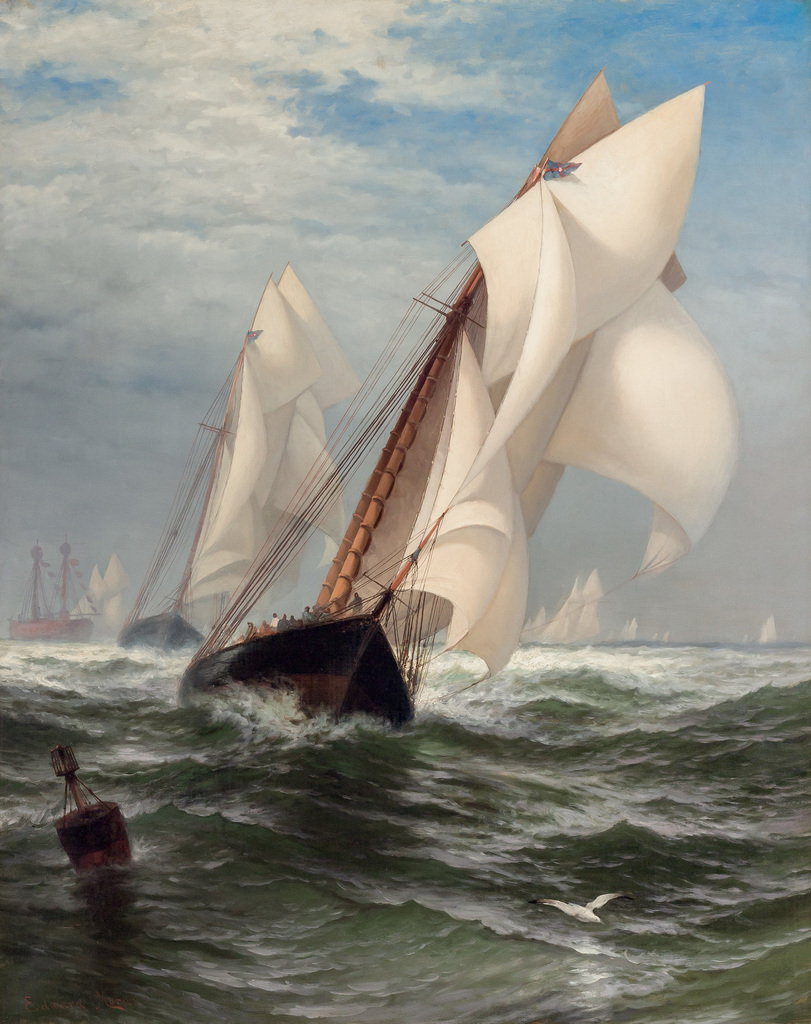
The Winning Yachts Madeleine and Countess of Dufferin by Edward Moran.

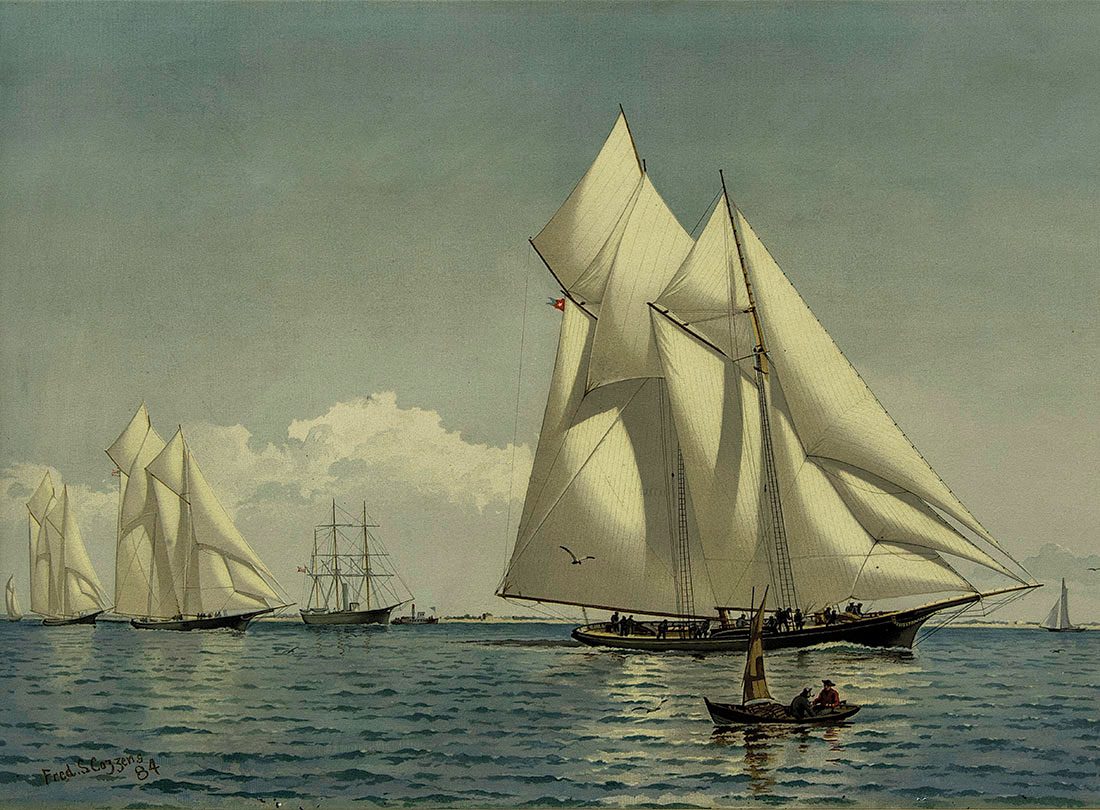
Painting depicting the America's Cup's Countess of Dufferin, America, Grant and Madeleine schooners in 1876.

On August 11, 1876, under the guidance of the New York Yacht Club, John S. Dickerson's Madeleine, skippered by Josephus Williams & David Snediker, was victorious against the Royal Canadian Yacht Club challenger Countess of Dufferin to defend the international America's Cup. The course started from the N.Y.Y.C. Club at House to the S.W. Split buoy, around the Sandy Hook lightship and return to buoy 15 on the west bank.

Madeleines time was at 5hr. 24min, and 55 secs. and the Countess of Dufferin time came in at 5hr. 34min, and 53 secs, which made the Madeleine the winner by 9min, 58 secs.

The second race for the America challenge was held the next day, which was the deciding victory for the Madeleine against the Countess of Dufferin. The America's cup remained in possession of the N.Y.Y.C.

Then Madeleine remained in New York under the ownership of John S. Dickerson as a pleasure sailboat continuing its yachting career before retiring.

== End of service ==
On August 5, 1900, Dickerson sold the Madeleine to Levin Denton Vinson and moved to Tampa, Florida to be used as a trading vessel in the West Indies. On September 12, 1911, she was dismantled and sunk at the mouth of the Hillsborough River, Florida.

== See also ==
- List of America's Cup challengers and defenders
