= 1885 America's Cup =

Yacht race

6th America's Cup
Defender USA
- Defender club: New York Yacht Club
- Yacht: Puritan

Challenger Great Britain
- Challenger club: Royal Yacht Squadron
- Yacht: Genesta

Competition
- Location: New York City
- Dates: 14-16 September 1885
- Rule: NYYC 85ft
- Winner: New York Yacht Club
- Score: (United States) 2 (United Kingdom) 0

The 1885 America's Cup was the 6th staging of the America's Cup yacht race. It was contested as a three-match-race series in New York City, New York, United States between Puritan owned by the John Malcolm Forbes syndicate, representing the defender, the New York Yacht Club; and Genesta owned by Sir Richard Sutton, representing the Royal Yacht Squadron. It was the first time since 1871 that a British club had issued a challenge. The captain of the Puritan was Aubrey Crocker.

== Results ==
Alternating Inside & Outside Course as in 1871, but first leg to leeward and return leg to windward. Puritan beat Genesta two wins to nil.

September 14, 1st race, 32.6 miles, Inside Course: Puritan beats Genesta by 16 minutes 19 sec in corrected time. September 16, 2nd race, 32 miles, Outside Course: Puritan beats Genesta by 1 minute 38 sec in corrected time.
