= 1876 America's Cup =

Yacht race

4th America's Cup
Defender USA
- Defender club: New York Yacht Club
- Yacht: Madeleine

Challenger Canada
- Challenger club: Royal Canadian Yacht Club
- Yacht: Countess of Dufferin

Competition
- Location: New York City
- Dates: 11-12 August 1876
- Rule: Schooner Match
- Winner: New York Yacht Club
- Score: (United States) 2 (Canada) 0

The 1876 America's Cup was the 4th staging of the America's Cup yacht race. It was contested as a three-match-race series in New York City, New York, United States, between Madeleine owned by John Stiles Dickerson, representing the defender, the New York Yacht Club; and Countess of Dufferin owned by Charles Gifford, representing the Royal Canadian Yacht Club. It was the first time a Canadian club had challenged the America’s Cup.

It is thought that the British did not challenge due to lingering acrimonious tensions from James Lloyd Ashbury's challenge of 1871. Records of the time state "the English did not seem inclined to regard the game worth the candle in challenging for it". By 1876, however, the NYYC were willing to make changes to the way the match was run; "the club was quite ready to make concessions and did so in a measure that showed time and reflection to have given it a broader view."

The Canadian challenges of 1876 and 1881, which have been described as "the weakest efforts ever made to win the Cup," most notably saw the shift in boat styles from the schooner to the sloop. The 1876 boat Countess of Dufferin and the later Atlanta were inland freshwater boats from the Canadian lakes.

Further changes in 1876 were that NYYC agreed to waive the customary six-month notice period as they felt it unnecessary to build a new vessel and were confident of a successful defence and that NYYC would name a single defending yacht in advance.

== Results ==
Over just two races, the Madeleine defeated the Countess of Dufferin, skippered by Alexander Cuthbert and owned by Major Charles Gifford, vice-commodore of the Royal Canadian Yacht Club of Toronto.

On August 11th, 1876, William skippered the defender to victory and beat Countess, skippered by Alexander Cuthbert, by 9:58 on elapsed time and 10:59 on corrected time. The next day, Madeleine outsailed the challenger to the finish by 27:14 on corrected time.
