= 1893 America's Cup =

Yacht race

9th America's Cup
Defender USA
- Defender club: New York Yacht Club
- Yacht: Vigilant

Challenger Great Britain
- Challenger club: Royal Northern Yacht Club
- Yacht: Valkyrie II

Competition
- Location: New York City
- Dates: TBD
- Rule: the Seawanhaka Rule
- Winner: New York Yacht Club
- Score: (United States) 3 (United Kingdom) 0

The 1893 America's Cup was the 9th staging of the America's Cup yacht race. It was contested as a best-of-three-match-race series in New York City, New York, United States between Vigilant owned by the Charles Oliver Iselin syndicate, representing the defender, the New York Yacht Club; and Valkyrie II owned by the Earl of Dunraven, representing the Royal Yacht Squadron.

The first challenge since the infamous editing of the Deed of Gift after the races of 1887, came from Lord Dunraven via the Squadron's secretary via telegram on 19 March 1889 and the NYYC accepted the challenge on 11 April 1889. However, they only accepted on the conditions laid out in the new Deed of Gift to which Dunraven and the Squadron's committee objected strongly.

After extended correspondence, in the Spring of 1889, the Squadron withdrew Dunraven's challenge stating that "We would not undertake the responsibility of entering into such a covenant, which would make the terms of the new deed of gift binding on any future challenger. We would further point out that the effect of accepting the conditions of the New York Yacht Club would be to compel the Royal Yacht Squadron to insist upon receiving, should it be successful in winning the Cup, more favourable terms from a challenger than those under which it challenged."

Dunraven wrote a letter in April 1890 to Mr J. R. Busk of the NYYC declaring the 1887 deed "altogether too complicated a document to govern a matter of sport such as yacht racing" There was no further correspondence on Cup matters until September 1892 when Dunraven wrote again to the NYYC. Eager to get racing the NYYC accepted Dunraven's renewed challenge on 5 December 1892.

Valkyrie arrived late summer (22 September) having weathered Atlantic storms and just two weeks before the starting race, "she appeared heavier in hull and rig than the American boat, though smaller in beam, length and spars."

== Results ==
=== 5 October - Racing Cancelled ===
Despite Valkyrie gaining an impressive lead over the becalmed Vigilant both yachts were eventually becalmed with sails idle on a glassy sea.

=== 7 October - The First Race ===
Vigilant won by 5 minutes, 48 seconds.

Yacht Name	Start			Outer Mark			Actual Time			Finish			Corrected Time		
Yacht Name	H	M	S	H	M	S	H	M	S	H	M	S	H	M	S
Vigilant	11	25	00	13	50	50	2	25	50	15	30	47	4	05	47
Valkyrie II	11	25	00	13	58	56	2	33	56	15	38	23	4	11	35

=== 9 October - The Second Race ===
Vigilant beats Valkyrie II by 10 mins 35 seconds.

Yacht Name	Start			First Mark			Actual Time			Second Mark			Actual Time			Finish			Corrected Time		
Yacht Name	H	M	S	H	M	S	H	M	S	H	M	S	H	M	S	H	M	S	H	M	S
Vigilant	11	25	00	13	06	35	1	41	35	13	56	55	0	50	20	14	50	01	3	25	01
Valkyrie II	11	25	00	13	11	20	1	46	20	14	05	52	0	54	32	15	02	24	3	37	24

=== 13 October - The Third Race ===
Vigilant beat Valkyrie II by 40 seconds retaining the Cup 3–0.

Yacht Name	Start			Outer Mark			Actual Time			Finish			Corrected Time		
Yacht Name	H	M	S	H	M	S	H	M	S	H	M	S	H	M	S
Vigilant	12	27	00	14	35	35	2	08	35	15	51	39	3	24	39
Valkyrie II	12	27	00	14	33	40	2	06	40	15	53	52	3	25	19
