= 1851 America's Cup =

1st America's Cup yacht race

0th America's Cup
Defender United Kingdom
- Defender club: Royal Yacht Squadron
- Yacht: 8 cutters, 9 schooners

Challenger United States
- Challenger club: New York Yacht Club
- Yacht: America

Competition
- Location: Isle of Wight, UK
- Dates: 22 August 1851
- Winner: New York Yacht Club
- Score: 1:0

The 100 Guineas Cup, also known as the Hundred Guinea Cup (£100 Cup), or the Cup of One Hundred Sovereigns, was a regatta in 1851 which was the first competition for the trophy later named America's Cup. The trophy was valued at 100 pounds-sterling which led to its various names, all variations on 100 Pound Cup. (Note: Guinea, Sovereign, Quid, Pound, and Pound-Sterling are frequently used interchangeably, though there are slight differences in value.) The race was won by the yacht America, leading to the trophy being renamed "America's Cup". The official event known as "The America's Cup" was founded in 1857, when the deed of gift established the racing regattas. The 1851 competition was a fleet race, whereas modern America's Cups finals are match races.

== History ==
The race originated with an invitation for the Great Exhibition of 1851 by the Earl of Winton, then Commodore of the Royal Yacht Squadron (RYS), inviting the recently formed New York Yacht Club (NYYC) to enjoy the facilities of the clubhouse of the RYS. John Cox Stevens, Commodore of the NYYC responded positively, and anticipated racing. Due to the RYS rules of the time, other races in the 1851 RYS Regatta were restricted to RYS members and their self-owned yachts, so the R. Y. S. £100 Cup was established, open to anyone to enter. At a RYS meeting on 9 May 1851, the race was scheduled for 22 August 1851. This race was to be the first of a series of challenge races for successive £100 Cups. At the time, it was normal practice for the winners to own the cups that were won, and not to return them for the next race to be won by others.

== Trophy ==
The trophy is a bottomless ewer made out of 134 troy ounces (4.2 kg) of silver, and is 27 in (69 cm) tall. The ewer was a stock item obtained by the (original) Marquess of Anglesey from jewellers and silversmiths R & S Garrard in 1848. He made the donation to the Royal Yacht Squadron in the hope they would use it for a special event to help the club revive from a sudden drop in attendance, afloat and ashore – the result of a short period of mismanagement under a Commodore who had assumed the role after Anglesey turned it down, at the age of 78. After the race, the trophy was engraved with the names of the yachts that raced against America, except the runner-up Aurora. The winning owners of the America considered melting the Cup down to make individual medals for each of them, but decided against it. They did however perpetuate a misconception, by engraving it "100 Guinea Cup" instead of "The £100 Cup". 100 guineas would have been 105 pounds.

== Race ==
The regatta, held on 22 August 1851, raced clockwise around the Isle of Wight in a fleet race. The course was called "The Queen's Course". The course was near Cowes Castle on the Isle of Wight, where the Royal Yacht Squadron headquarters are located. The race took place as part of the 1851 Royal Yacht Squadron Regatta. The signal gun for sailing was fired at 10am, and the winner saluted by a gun from the flag-ship at 8:34 p.m. (8:37 p.m. railway time).

Eighteen yachts were entered for the race, but only 15 yachts started the race. The yacht Fernande did not make the start, while Strella and Titania both got to the starting line, though did not start the race. Those yachts that raced were America, Alarm, Arrow, Aurora, Bacchante, Beatrice, Brilliant, Constance, Eclipse, Freak, Gipsy Queen, Ione, Mona, Volante, and Wyvern.

Standing	Yacht	Class	Tons	Owner	Designer/Builder	Yacht club	Time	Notes
Winner	America	Schooner	170	John Cox Stevens, Edwin Augustus Stevens, James A. Hamilton, George L. Schuyler, Hamilton Wilkes, John Beekman Finlay	George Steers / William H. Brown	New York Yacht Club	10h34'	
2nd	Aurora	Cutter	47	Le Marchant Thomas, Esq.	Michael Ratsey / Cowes	Royal Yacht Squadron	10h58'	
3rd	Bacchante	Cutter	80	Benjamin Heywood Jones, Esq.	Thomas and James Manlaws Wanhill / Poole	Royal Yacht Squadron	11h30'	
4th	Eclipse	Cutter	50	Henry Samuel Fearon, Esq.	Wanhill	Royal Western Yacht Club & Royal St George Yacht Club	11h45'	
5th	Brilliant	3-mast-schooner	392	George Holland Ackers	John Rubie / Southampton	Royal Victoria Yacht Club (England)	13h20'	
DSQ/DNF	Alarm	Cutter	193	Joseph Weld	Thomas Inman / Lymington			
DSQ/DNF	Arrow	Cutter	84	Thomas Chamberlayne, Esq.	Thomas Inman / Lymington	Royal Yacht Squadron		
DSQ/DNF	Beatrix aka Beatrice	Schooner	161	Sir Walter Palk Carew, Bart.	William Camper / Gosport	Royal Yacht Squadron		
DSQ/DNF	Constance	Schooner	218	2nd Marquis of Conyngham	Joseph White / East Cowes			
DSQ/DNF	Freak	Cutter	60	William Curling	Wanhill			
DSQ/DNF	Gipsy Queen	Schooner	160	Sir Henry Bold Hoghton, Bart.	White			
DSQ/DNF	Ione	Schooner	75	Almon Hill, Esq.	White	Royal Yacht Squadron		
DSQ/DNF	Mona	Cutter	82	Lord Alfred Paget	Richard Pinney / Poole			
DSQ/DNF	Volante	Cutter	48	John Livingstone Craigie, Esq.	Thomas Harvey / Ipswich	Royal Thames Yacht Club & Royal London Yacht Club		
DSQ/DNF	Wyvern	Schooner	205	Duke of Marlborough	Camper			
DSQ/DNS	Fernande	Schooner	127	Francis Mountjoy Martyn	William Camper / Gosport			
DNS	Stella	Cutter	65	Richard Frankland, Esq.	George & James Inman / Lymington	Royal Yacht Squadron		
DNS	Titania	Schooner	100	Robert Stephenson, Esq.	Robinson and Russell / Millwall			Consumed by fire on 5 May 1852 at Cowes

- DSQ/DNF – competitor did not finish under the time limit
- DSQ/DNS – competitor did not make it to the starting line
- DNS – did not start – competitor did not make it off the starting line
- DNF – did not finish
- DSQ – disqualified

== Gallery ==
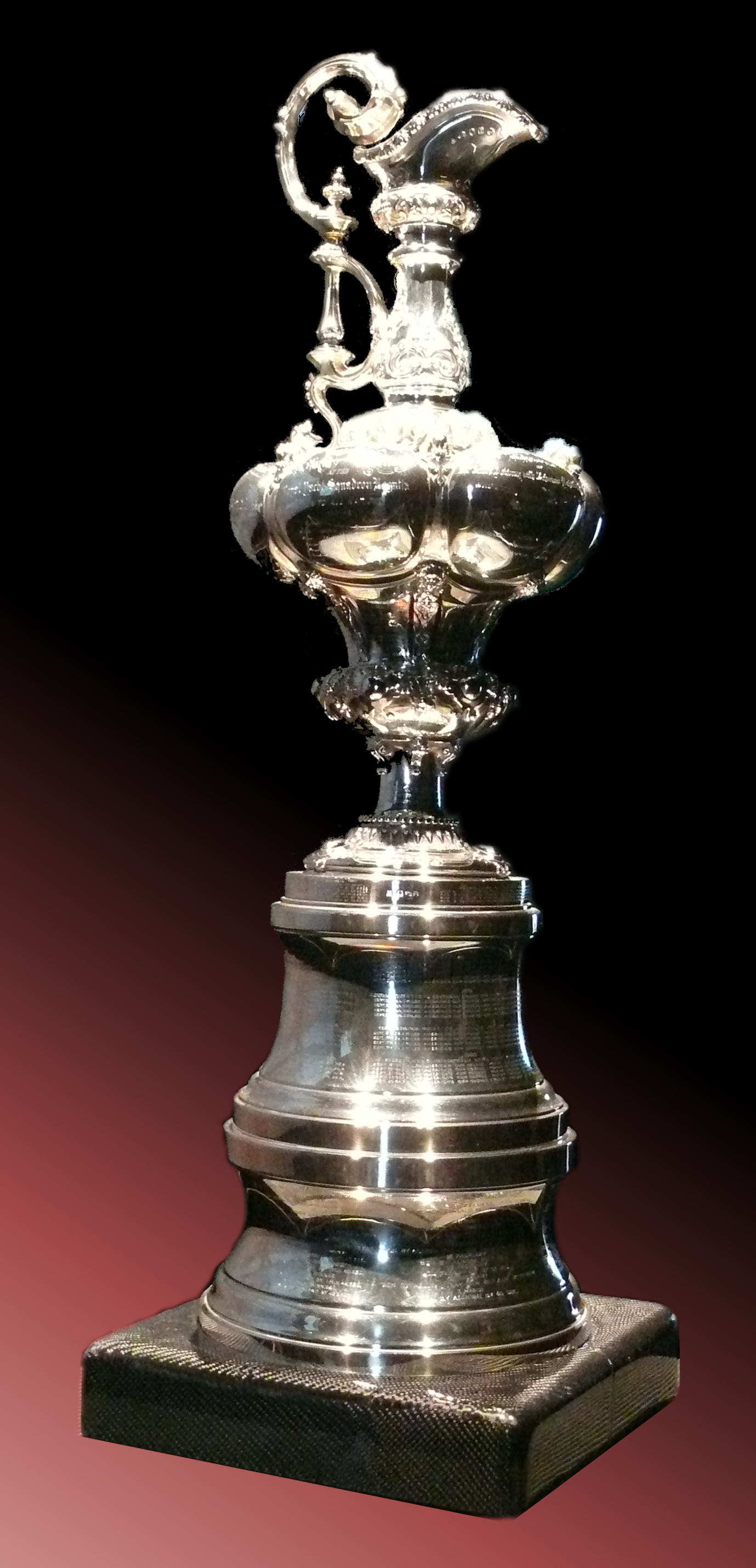
The trophy

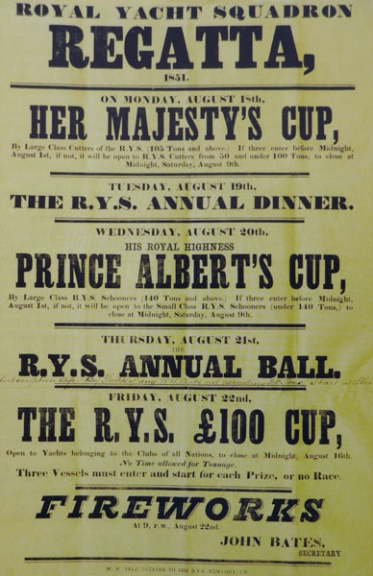
A flyer from the RYS for, among other things, the race. In it, the race is referred to as the "R.Y.S. £100 Cup".

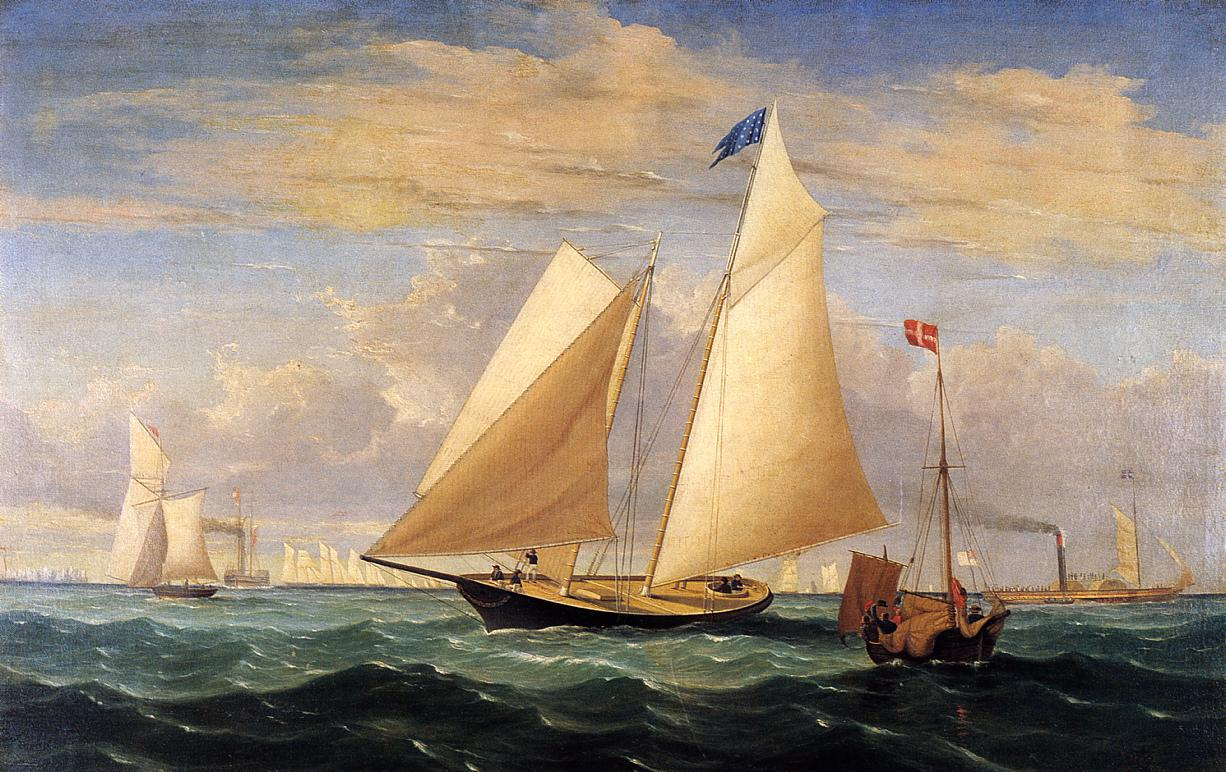
America, the winner, crossing the finish line

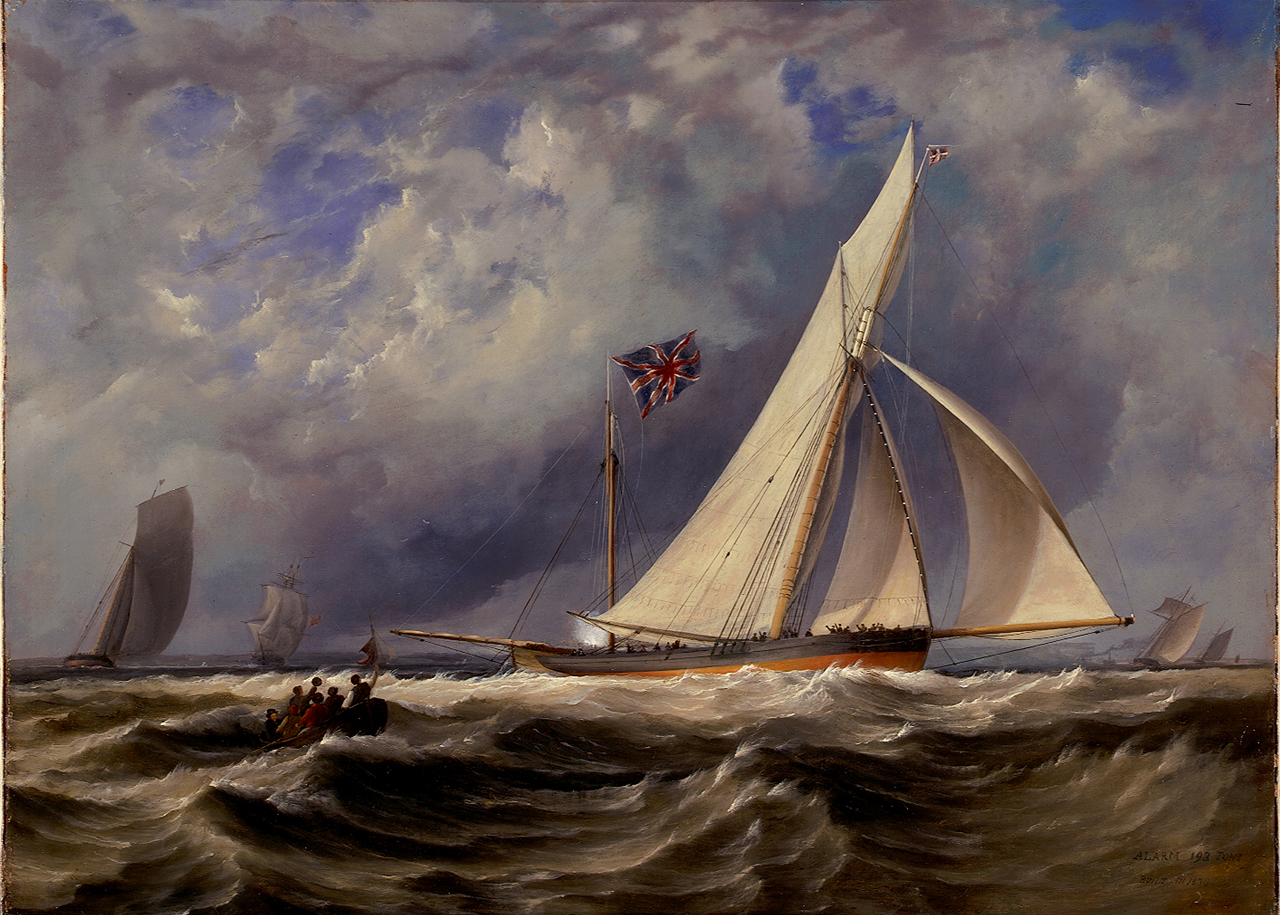
Alarm, largest yacht in the regatta
