= Defender (1895 yacht) =

America's Cup champion

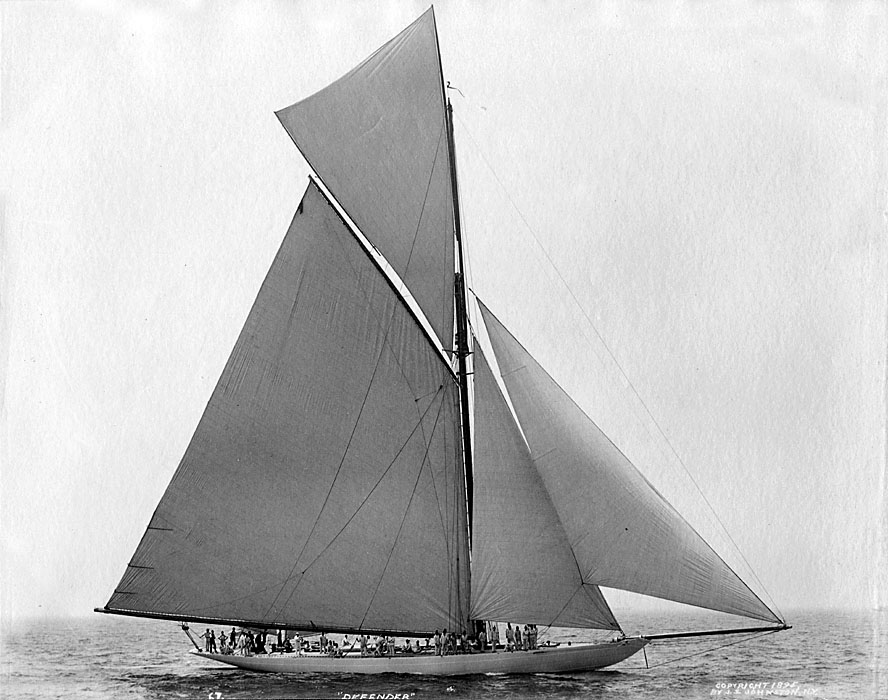
- Defender on July 20, 1895, six weeks before the 1895 America's Cup.
- Yacht club: New York Yacht Club
- Nation: United States
- Designer(s): Nathanael Greene Herreshoff
- Builder: Herreshoff Manufacturing Company
- Launched: 1895
- Owner(s): William Kissam Vanderbilt, Edwin Dennison Morgan, Charles Oliver Iselin
- Fate: Broken up in 1901

Racing career
- Skippers: Henry C. Haff
- Notable victories: 1895 America's Cup; 1895 Defender Trials
- America's Cup: 1895

Specifications
- Displacement: 151.5 tons
- Length: 123 ft 0 in (37.49 m) LOA; 89 ft 1.5 in (27.165 m) LWL
- Beam: 23 ft 1 in (7.04 m)
- Draft: 19 ft 1 in (5.82 m)
- Sail area: 12,602 sq ft (1,170.8 m^{2})

Defender was the victorious United States defender of the tenth America's Cup in 1895 against challenger Valkyrie III. Defender was designed by Nathanael Greene Herreshoff and built by the Herreshoff Manufacturing Company in 1895. It was Herreshoff's second victorious America's Cup defender design.

== Design ==
Defender was a sloop with all-metal construction: steel, aluminum, and manganese bronze. It was owned by William Kissam Vanderbilt, Edwin Dennison Morgan and Charles Oliver Iselin, and skippered by Henry C. Haff.

== Career ==
Defender defeated the New York Yacht Club's Vigilant then went on to defend the cup against British keel cutter Valkyrie III. Lord Dunraven of the Valkyrie alleged cheating by the Defender's crew.

Following the contest, Defender was towed to the residence of C. Oliver Iselin in New Rochelle, New York where it remained docked for four years without sailing. In 1899 J. Pierpont Morgan and W. Buttler Duncan rebuilt Defender to race trials against the America's Cup defense candidate, Columbia.

The yacht was towed to Herreshoff's Bristol yard for restoration to enable it to race in the selection trials for the 1899 defence. Following the selection trials, Defender returns to its mooring and was finally broken up in 1901.

== Model ==
Model of Defender on display at the MIT Museum

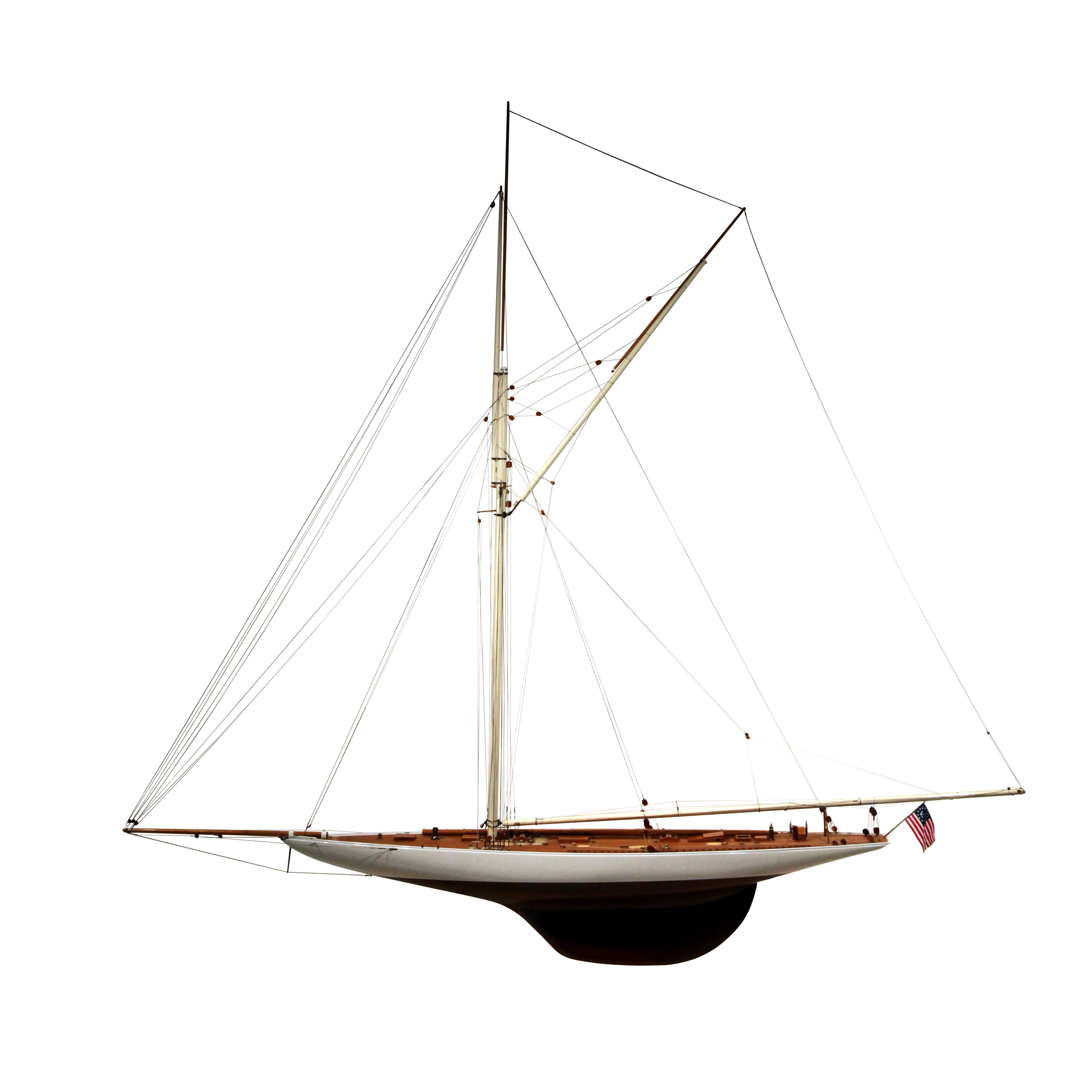
overall view, showing the hull (including the keel) and rigging

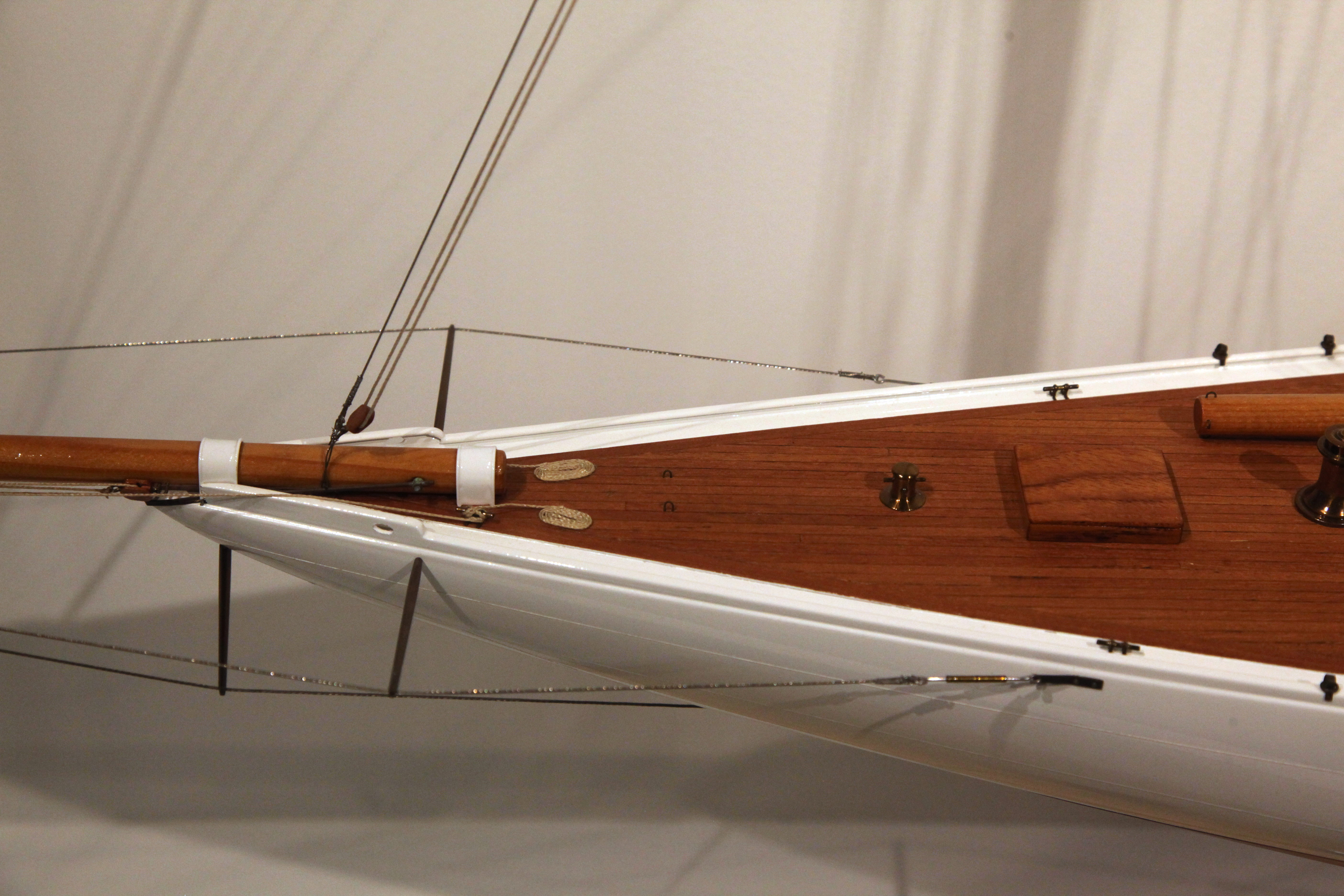
Bow

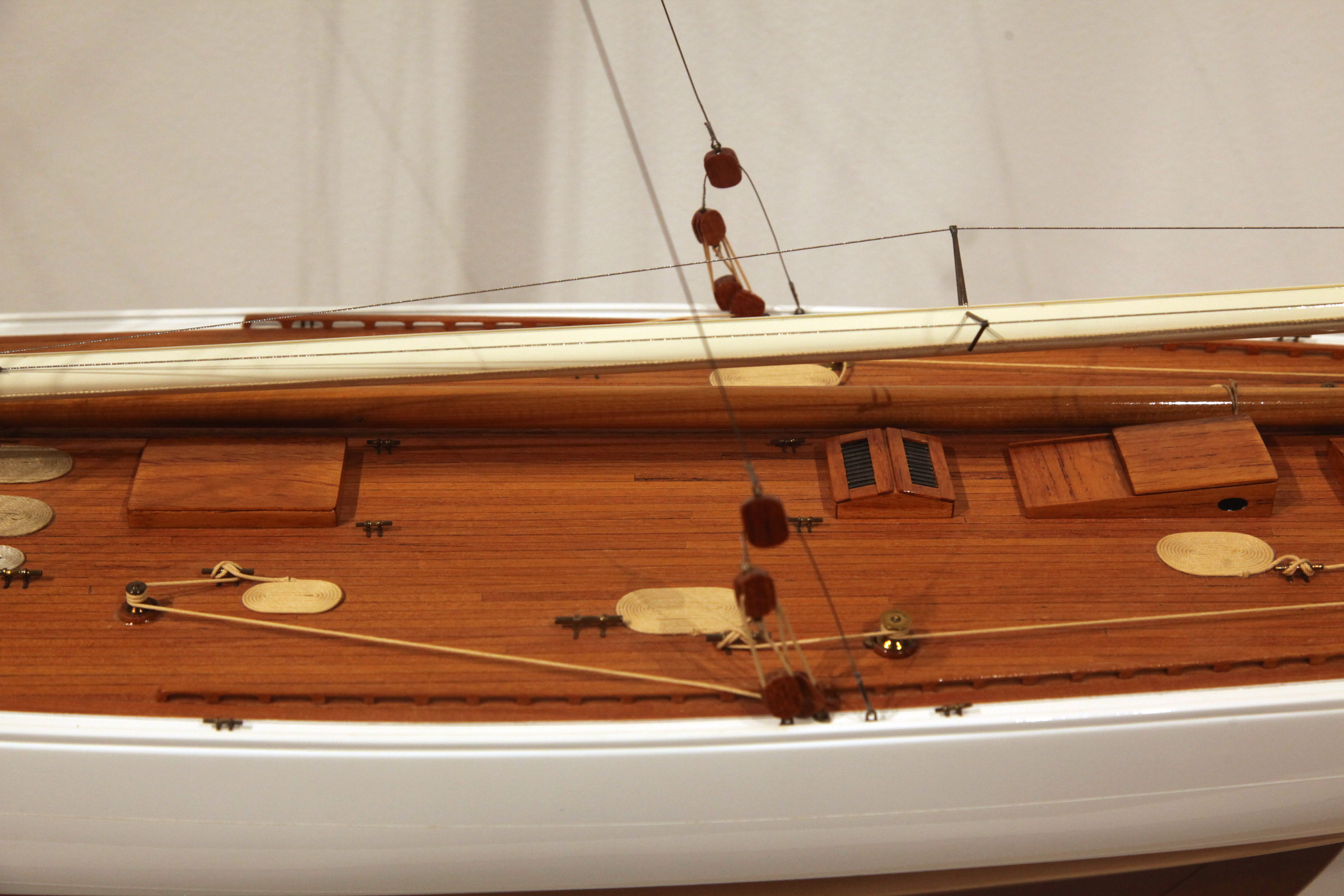
Mast

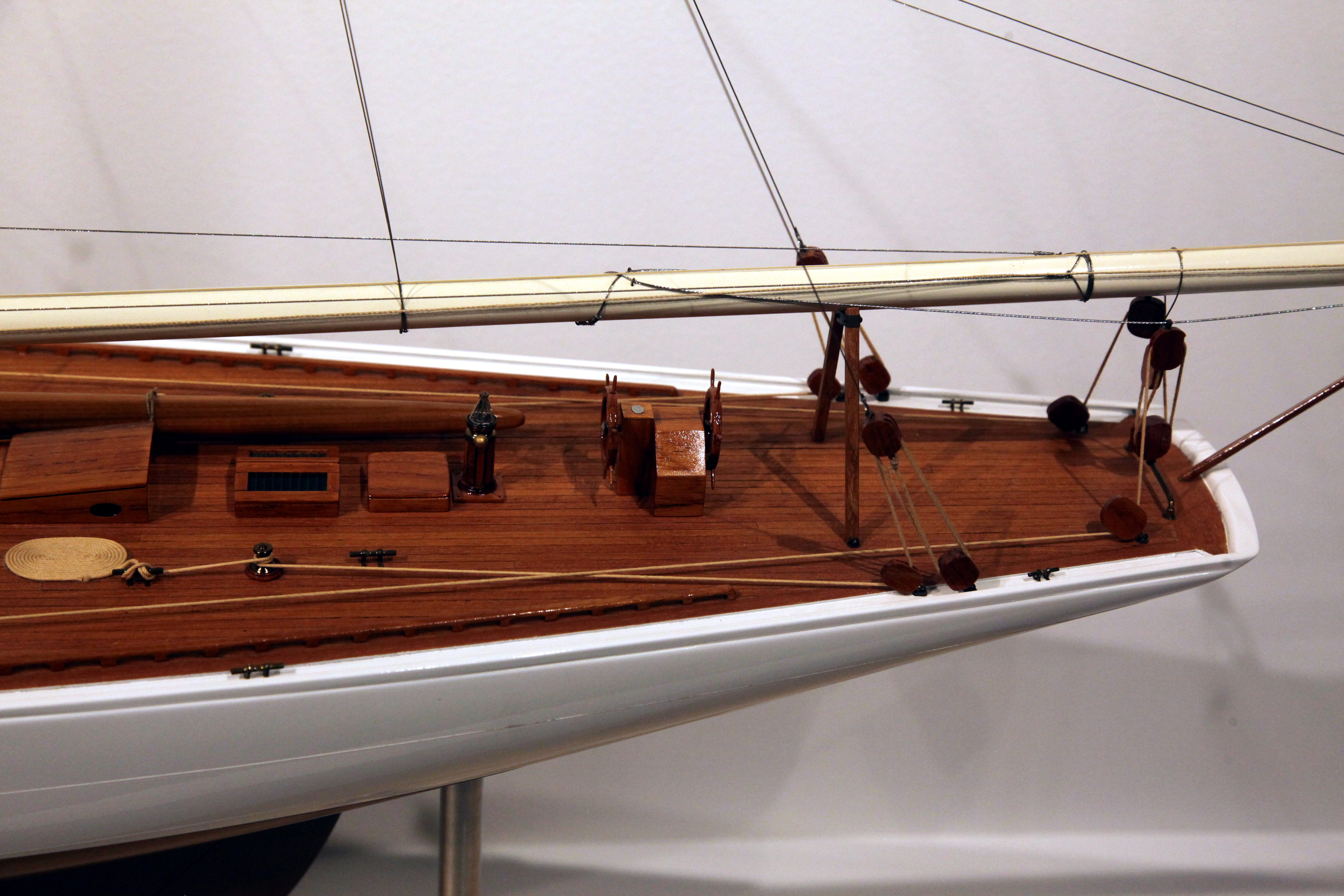
Aft

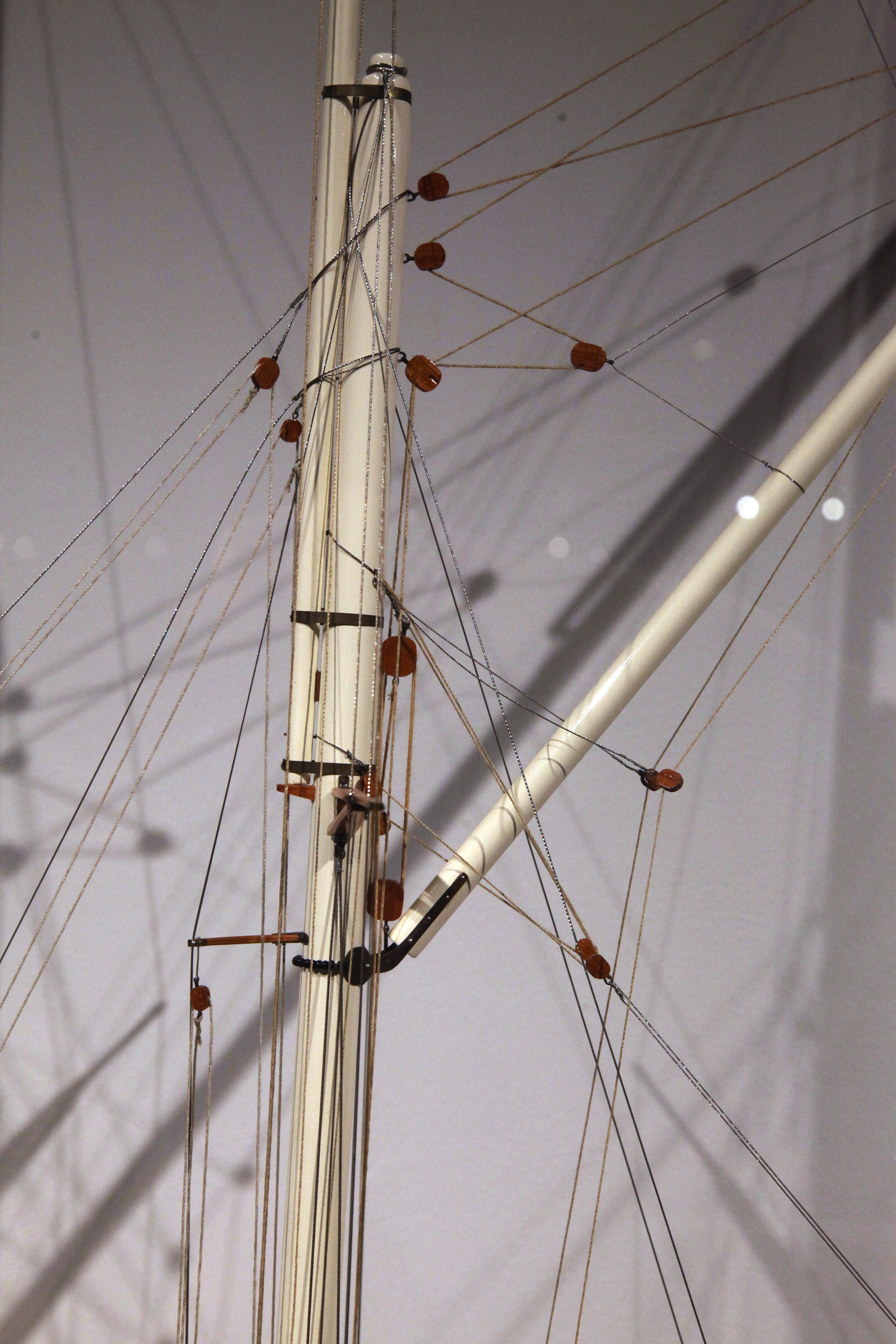
Rigging
