= Mischief (yacht) =

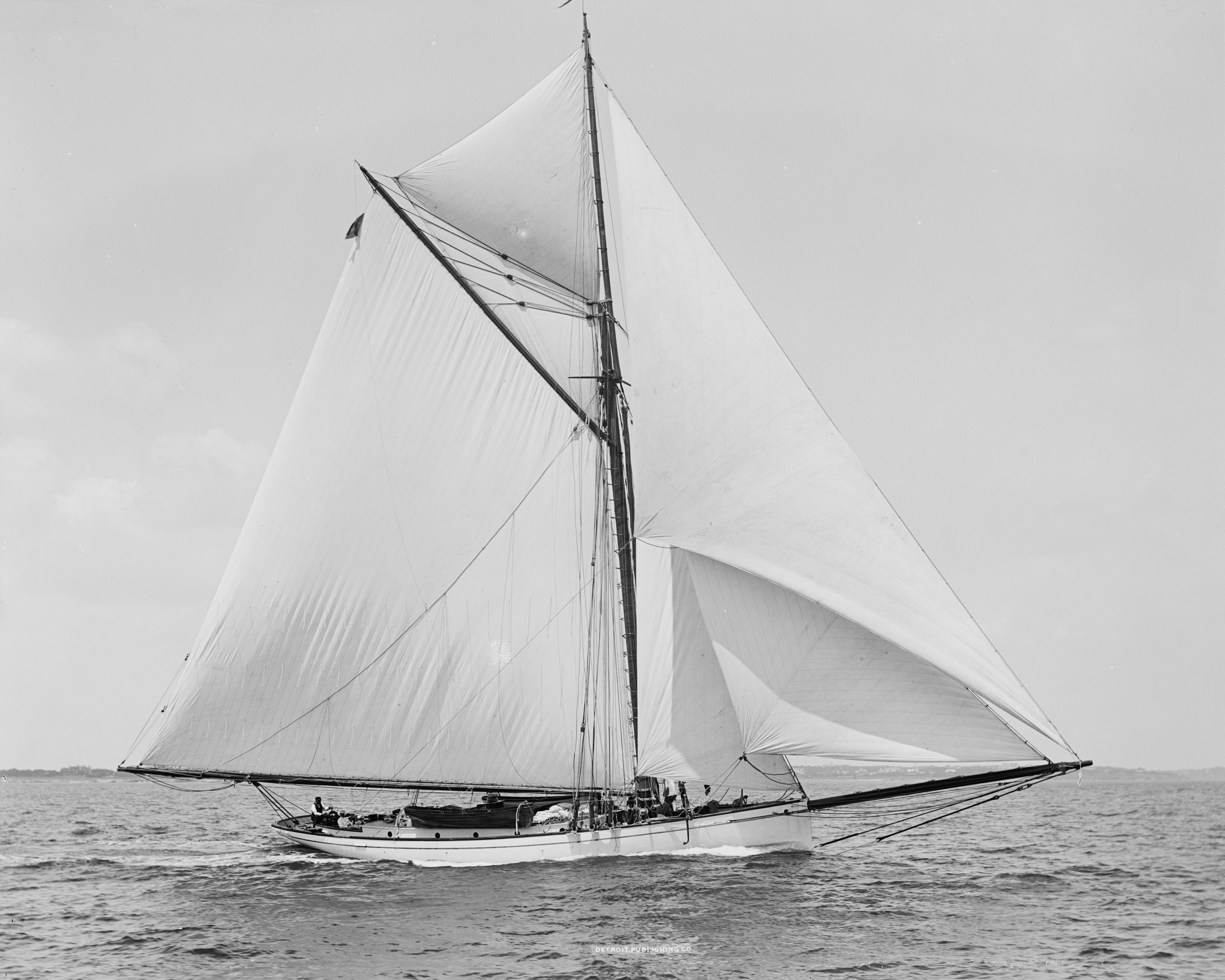
- The Mischief as pictured in 1891
- Yacht club: New York Yacht Club
- Nation: United States
- Designer(s): Archibald Cary Smith
- Builder: Harlan & Hollingsworth
- Owner(s): Joseph Richard Busk
- Fate: Scuttled 1929

Racing career
- Skippers: Nathanael 'Than' Clock
- Notable victories: 1881 America's Cup
- America's Cup: 1881

Specifications
- Displacement: 79.2 tons
- Length: 20.57 m (67.5 ft) (LOA); 18.59 m (61.0 ft) (LWL)
- Beam: 6.00 m (19.69 ft)
- Draft: 1.62 m (5 ft 4 in)
- Sail area: 487 m^{2} (5,240 sq ft)

The yacht Mischief was the victorious American defender of the fourth America's Cup race in 1881 against Canadian challenger Atalanta.

== Design ==
The centerboard compromise sloop Mischief was designed by Archibald Cary Smith and built by Harlan & Hollingsworth of Wilmington, Delaware in 1879 for English owner Joseph Richard Busk of the New York Yacht Club. She was built of iron construction, the second all-metal yacht to be built in the United States.

== Career ==
Nicknamed "The Iron Pot", Mischief was the victorious defender of the fourth America's Cup challenge in 1881. She was skippered by Nathanael 'Than' Clock during the race.

The Mischief was seized in 1904 for suspected smuggling between the United States and Canada, and stripped of its yacht registration. She was bought in 1906 by the Mayflower Oil Company and used as a barge. In 1929 she was towed offshore and scuttled.

== References and external links ==
Media related to Mischief (ship, 1879) at Wikimedia Commons

- America's Cup's Ac-clopaedia
- The 19th Century Yacht Photography of J.S. Johnston
