= Galatea (yacht) =

Yacht built in 1885

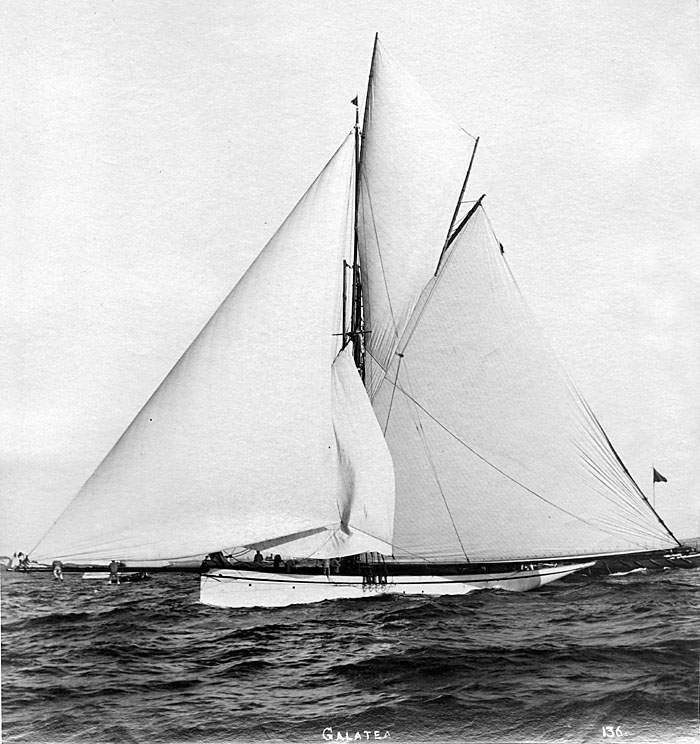
- British yacht Galatea.
- Yacht club: Royal Northern Yacht Club
- Nation: United Kingdom
- Designer(s): John Beavor-Webb
- Launched: May 1885
- Owner(s): Lieutenant William Henn, R.N.
- Fate: Sold for scrap January 1912

Racing career
- America's Cup: 1886

Specifications
- Length: 31.22 m (102.4 ft) (LOA); 26.45 m (86.8 ft) (LWL)
- Beam: 4.57 m (15.0 ft)
- Draft: 4.16 m (13.6 ft)
- Sail area: 675.45 m^{2} (7,270.5 sq ft)

Galatea was the unsuccessful British challenger of the sixth America's Cup race in 1886 against American defender Mayflower.

== Design ==
Galatea, a gaff cutter, was designed by John Beavor-Webb and built in 1885 for owner Lieutenant William Henn, R.N. of the Royal Northern Yacht Club. Henn named her after HMS Galatea, on which he had served from 1862 to 1866.

The all-metal Galatea had a steel frame, a lead-filled steel keel, and a riveted steel-planked hull, painted white. The deck was teak.

== Career ==
Galatea was launched in May 1885. After a series of mostly losses in British races, the owner and his wife sailed to New York in the summer of 1886.

Galatea lost both races in the September 1886 America's Cup in New York to the American defender Mayflower. During these 1886 voyages, Galatea had a monkey named Peggy on board as a mascot. The monkey became ill and died and was buried in Brooklyn, NY.

Following his defeat, Henn challenged General Paine of the Mayflower to a private rematch, and in the spring of 1887 was defeated again. Galatea won the Queen's Jubilee Cup Royal Nova Scotia Yacht Squadron Regatta in Halifax N.S. 20 August 1887.

From 1888 until 1894, Mr. and Mrs. Henn lived aboard Galatea in Britain. Following Lt. Henn's death in 1894, Mrs. Henn continued to live aboard the yacht until her death in 1911.

In January 1912, the Galatea was sold for scrap and broken up.

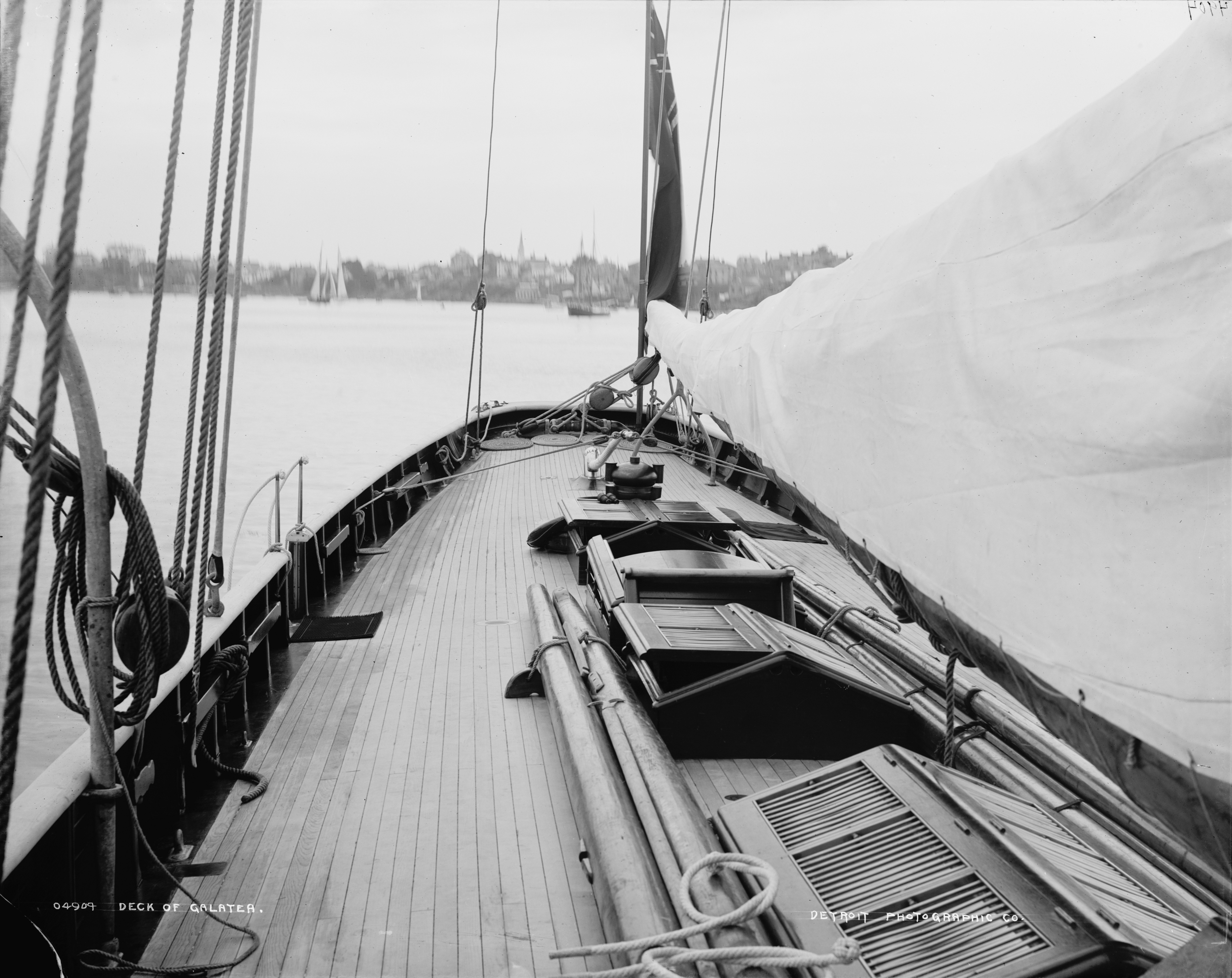
Galatea afterdeck
