= America's Cup =

Sailing race competition

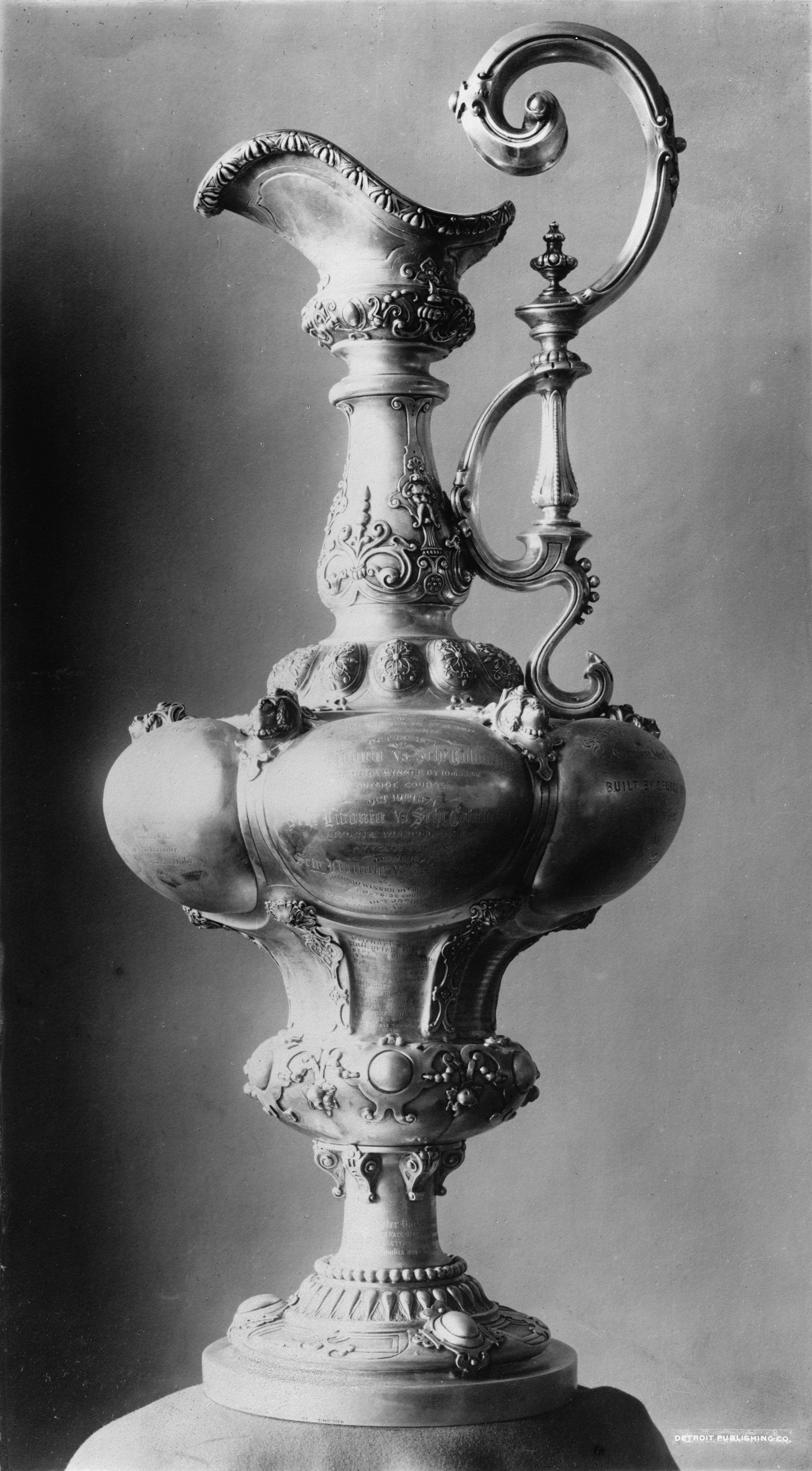
- The America's Cup trophy (ewer), photographed c. 1890–1915
- Sport: Sailing match race
- Founded: 1851 (175 years ago)
- Most recent champion: Royal New Zealand Yacht Squadron (5th title)
- Most titles: New York Yacht Club (25 titles)
- Website: americascup.com
- 2027 America's Cup

The America's Cup is a sailing competition and the oldest international competition still operating in any sport. America's Cup match races are held between two sailing yachts: one from the yacht club that currently holds the trophy (known as the defender) and the other from the yacht club that is challenging for the cup (the challenger). The winner is awarded the America's Cup trophy, informally known as the Auld Mug. Matches are held several years apart on dates agreed between the defender and the challenger. There is no fixed schedule, but the races have generally been held every three to four years.

Any yacht club that meets the requirements specified in the Deed of Gift of the America's Cup has the right to challenge the yacht club that currently holds the cup. If the challenging club wins the match, it gains stewardship of the cup. From the first defence of the cup in 1870 until the twentieth defence in 1967, there was always only one challenger. In 1970 multiple challengers applied, so a Challenger Selection Series was held to decide which applicant would become the official challenger and compete in the America's Cup match. This approach has been used for each subsequent competition.

The history and prestige associated with the America's Cup attract the world's top sailors, yacht designers, wealthy entrepreneurs, and sponsors. It is a test of sailing skill, boat and sail design, and fundraising and management skills. Competing for the cup is expensive, with modern teams spending more than US$100 million each; the 2013 winner was estimated to have spent US$300 million on the competition.

The most recent 2024 America's Cup was held in October 2024 between the challengers, Royal Yacht Squadron's INEOS Britannia, and the defending champions, Royal New Zealand Yacht Squadron, who won 7–2.

== History ==
The America's Cup is the oldest competition in international sport, and the fourth oldest continuous sporting trophy of any kind. The cup itself was manufactured in 1848 and first called the "RYS £100 Cup". It was first raced for on 22 August 1851 around the Isle of Wight off Southampton and Portsmouth in Hampshire, England, in a fleet race between the New York Yacht Club's America and 15 yachts of the Royal Yacht Squadron. The race was witnessed by Queen Victoria and the future Edward VII and won by America. This is considered to be the first America's Cup race.

On 8 July 1857, the surviving members of the America syndicate donated the cup to the New York Yacht Club via the Deed of Gift of the America's Cup filed with the New York Supreme Court. The deed is the primary instrument that governs the rules to make a valid challenge for the America's Cup and the rules of conduct of the races. It states that the cup "is donated upon the condition that it shall be preserved as a perpetual challenge Cup for friendly competition between foreign countries". The deed also outlines how a foreign yacht club can make a challenge to the holder of the cup and what happens if the clubs do not agree on the conduct of the match. The deed makes it "distinctly understood that the cup is to be the property of the club [that has most recently won a match for the cup], subject to the provisions of this deed, and not the property of the owner or owners of any vessel winning a match".

The trophy was held by the NYYC from 1857 until 1983. The NYYC successfully defended the trophy 24 times in a row before being defeated by the Royal Perth Yacht Club, represented by the yacht Australia II. Including the original 1851 victory, the NYYC's 132-year reign was the longest (in terms of time) winning streak in any sport.

Early matches for the Cup were raced between yachts measuring 65–90 ft (20–27 m) on the waterline that were owned by wealthy sportsmen. This culminated with the J-Class regattas of the 1930s. After World War II and almost twenty years without a challenge, the NYYC made changes to the Deed of Gift to allow smaller, less expensive 12-metre class yachts to compete; this class was used from 1958 until 1987. It was replaced in 1990 by the International America's Cup Class, which was used until 2007. In 1983, for the first time in the Cup's history, the team behind Australia II won the 25th America's Cup in Newport, RI, USA. This was the first time in more than 132 years that a non-American team won the America's Cup, ending the longest winning streak in international sports.

After a long legal battle, the 2010 America's Cup was raced in 90 ft (27 m) waterline multihull yachts in Valencia, Spain. The victorious Golden Gate Yacht Club then elected to race the 2013 America's Cup in AC72 foiling, wing-sail catamarans and successfully defended the cup. The 2017 America's Cup Match was sailed in 50 ft (15 m) foiling catamarans in Bermuda, after legal battles and disputes over the rule changes. The Emirates Team New Zealand won the 35th America's Cup, therefore marking a change in the role of Defender going from an American Yacht Club back to the Royal New Zealand Yacht Squadron in Auckland.

After winning the 2017 America's Cup in Bermuda, Emirates Team New Zealand successfully defended the Cup in 2021 in Auckland as well as 2024 in Barcelona. These three consecutive wins introduced more consistency for boat designs and race formats since all regattas have been competed in the newly designed AC75 class that was introduced for the 36th America's Cup in 2021. According to the current protocol for the 38th America's Cup, the AC75 will be used for the upcoming edition again and it is also intended to keep the AC75 class for the 39th America's Cup potentially held in 2029.

== The America's Cup trophy ==
The Cup, also known as the Auld Mug, is an ornate sterling silver bottomless ewer crafted in 1848 by Garrard & Co. Henry William Paget, 1st Marquess of Anglesey, bought one and donated it for the Royal Yacht Squadron's 1851 Annual Regatta around the Isle of Wight.

The cup was originally known as the 'R.Y.S. £100 Cup', awarded in 1851 by the British Royal Yacht Squadron for a race around the Isle of Wight in the United Kingdom. The winning yacht was a schooner called America, owned by a syndicate of members from the New York Yacht Club (NYYC). In 1857, the syndicate permanently donated the trophy to the NYYC, under a Deed of Gift that renamed the trophy as the 'America's Cup' after the first winner and required it be made available for perpetual international competition.

It was originally known as the "R.Y.S. £100 Cup", standing for a cup of a hundred GB Pounds or "sovereigns" in value. The cup was subsequently mistakenly engraved as the "100 Guinea Cup" by the America syndicate, but was also referred to as the "Queen's Cup" (a guinea is an old monetary unit of one pound and one shilling, now £1.05). Today, the trophy is officially known as the "America's Cup" after the 1851 winning yacht, and is affectionately called the "Auld Mug" by the sailing community. It is inscribed with names of the yachts that competed for it, and has been modified twice by adding matching bases to accommodate more names.

== Rules for issuing challenge ==
All challenges for the America's Cup are made under the Deed of Gift of the America's Cup, which outlines who can challenge for the cup, and what information a challenge must provide to the defender. The deed then allows for most of the arrangements for the match to be made by negotiation and mutual consent, but provides a backstop in the event agreement is not reached. The first valid challenge that is made must be accepted by the defender or it must forfeit the cup to that valid challenger or negotiate other terms.

To be eligible, a challenging club must be "an organized yacht Club" of a country other than the defender's, which is "incorporated, patented, or licensed by the legislature, admiralty or other executive department". The club must hold an "annual regatta [on] an ocean water course on the sea, or on an arm of the sea, or one which combines both". The New York Supreme Court and the New York Court of Appeals have held that this means the challenging club must in fact "have held at least one qualifying annual regatta before it submits its Notice of Challenge to a Defender and demonstrate that it will continue to have qualifying annual regattas on an ongoing basis" and not merely intend to hold its first annual regatta before the envisaged America's Cup match. The New York Supreme Court has also found that the Great Lakes between the United States and Canada are arms of the sea, allowing clubs with regattas on those lakes to be challengers.

The challenge document must give dates for the proposed races, which must be no less than 10 months from the date the challenge is made, and within date ranges specified for both the northern and southern hemispheres. The challenge document must also provide information on the yacht, including length on load water line; beam at load water line, and extreme beam; and draught of water. If the yacht has one mast, it must be between 44 and 90 feet (13 and 27 m) on the load water line. If it has more than one mast, it must be between 80 and 115 feet (24 and 35 m) on the load water line. These dimensions may not be exceeded by either challenger or defender. The yachts must be propelled by sails only and be constructed in the country to which the challenging and defending clubs belong. Centreboard or sliding keel vessels are allowed with no restrictions nor limitations, and neither the centre-board nor sliding keel is considered a part of the vessel for any purposes of measurement. As long as these rules are met, the New York Court of Appeals has ruled that the defender may use a boat of a different category to the challenger, such as meeting a challenge in a monohull with a catamaran.

Under the deed, the defender and challenger "may by mutual consent make any arrangement satisfactory to both as to the dates, courses, number of trials, rules and sailing regulations, and any and all other conditions of the match, in which case also the ten months' notice may be waived". Since 1958, the practice has usually been for the defender and challenger to agree that the challenger shall be a Challenger of Record, which then arranges a Challenger Series involving a number of other yacht clubs from countries other than that of the defender. The yacht that wins the Challenger Series wins the Herbert Pell Cup and also an associated sponsored cup such as the Prada Cup in 2021 or the Louis Vuitton Cup from 1983 to 2017, and again in 2024.

However, if the challenger and defender cannot agree, the deed provides a backstop, requiring a first-to-two match on ocean courses defined in the deed, at a venue selected by the defender, under its rules and sailing regulations so far as they do not conflict with the provisions of the deed, on the dates submitted by the challenger and in yachts meeting the terms of the deed and the challenge notice.

== Challengers and defenders ==
Challengers and defenders
Rule	Year	Venue	Defending club	Defender	Score	Challenger	Challenging club
Fleet racing	1851	Isle of Wight	(United Kingdom) Royal Yacht Squadron	8 cutters and 9 schooners, runner-up Aurora	0–1	John Cox Stevens syndicate, America	(United States) New York Yacht Club
Fleet racing	1870	New York City	(United States) New York Yacht Club	17 schooners, winner Franklin Osgood's Magic	1–0	James Lloyd Ashbury, Cambria	(United Kingdom) Royal Thames Yacht Club
Schooner match	1871	New York City	(United States) New York Yacht Club	Franklin Osgood, Columbia (2–1) and William Proctor Douglas, Sappho (2–0)	4–1	James Lloyd Ashbury, Livonia	(United Kingdom) Royal Harwich Yacht Club
Schooner match	1876	New York City	(United States) New York Yacht Club	John Stiles Dickerson, Madeleine	2–0	Charles Gifford, Countess of Dufferin	(Canada) Royal Canadian Yacht Club
65 ft sloop	1881	New York City	(United States) New York Yacht Club	Joseph Richard Busk, Mischief	2–0	Alexander Cuthbert, Atalanta	(Canada) Bay of Quinte Yacht Club
NYYC 85ft	1885	New York City	(United States) New York Yacht Club	John Malcolm Forbes syndicate, Puritan	2–0	Sir Richard Sutton, Genesta	(United Kingdom) Royal Yacht Squadron
NYYC 85ft	1886	New York City	(United States) New York Yacht Club	Charles Jackson Paine, Mayflower	2–0	Lt. & Mrs. William Henn, Galatea	(United Kingdom) Royal Northern Yacht Club
NYYC 85ft	1887	New York City	(United States) New York Yacht Club	Charles Jackson Paine, Volunteer	2–0	James Bell syndicate, Thistle	(United Kingdom) Royal Clyde Yacht Club
SCYC 85ft	1893	New York City	(United States) New York Yacht Club	Charles Oliver Iselin syndicate, Vigilant	3–0	Earl of Dunraven, Valkyrie II	(United Kingdom) Royal Yacht Squadron
SCYC 90ft	1895	New York City	(United States) New York Yacht Club	William K. Vanderbilt syndicate, Defender	3–0	Earl of Dunraven syndicate, Valkyrie III	(United Kingdom) Royal Yacht Squadron
SCYC 90ft	1899	New York City	(United States) New York Yacht Club	J. Pierpont Morgan syndicate, Columbia	3–0	Sir Thomas Lipton, Shamrock	(United Kingdom) Royal Ulster Yacht Club
SCYC 90ft	1901	New York City	(United States) New York Yacht Club	J. Pierpont Morgan syndicate, Columbia	3–0	Sir Thomas Lipton, Shamrock II	(United Kingdom) Royal Ulster Yacht Club
SCYC 90ft	1903	New York City	(United States) New York Yacht Club	Cornelius Vanderbilt III syndicate, Reliance	3–0	Sir Thomas Lipton, Shamrock III	(United Kingdom) Royal Ulster Yacht Club
Universal 75 ft	1920	New York City	(United States) New York Yacht Club	Henry Walters syndicate, Resolute	3–2	Sir Thomas Lipton, Shamrock IV	(United Kingdom) Royal Ulster Yacht Club
J-Class	1930	Newport	(United States) New York Yacht Club	Harold S. Vanderbilt syndicate, Enterprise	4–0	Sir Thomas Lipton, Shamrock V	(United Kingdom) Royal Ulster Yacht Club
J-Class	1934	Newport	(United States) New York Yacht Club	Harold S. Vanderbilt syndicate, Rainbow	4–2	Sir Thomas Sopwith, Endeavour	(United Kingdom) Royal Yacht Squadron
J-Class	1937	Newport	(United States) New York Yacht Club	Harold S. Vanderbilt, Ranger	4–0	Sir Thomas Sopwith, Endeavour II	(United Kingdom) Royal Yacht Squadron
12 Metre	1958	Newport	(United States) New York Yacht Club	Henry Sears, Columbia	4–0	Hugh Goodson syndicate, Sceptre	(United Kingdom) Royal Yacht Squadron
12 Metre	1962	Newport	(United States) New York Yacht Club	Mercer, Walsh, Frese syndicate, Weatherly	4–1	Sir Frank Packer, Gretel	(Australia) Royal Sydney Yacht Squadron
12 Metre	1964	Newport	(United States) New York Yacht Club	Eric Ridder syndicate, Constellation	4–0	Anthony Boyden, Sovereign	(United Kingdom) Royal Thames Yacht Club
12 Metre	1967	Newport	(United States) New York Yacht Club	William Justice Strawbridge syndicate, Intrepid	4–0	Emil Christensen, Dame Pattie	(Australia) Royal Sydney Yacht Squadron
12 Metre	1970	Newport	(United States) New York Yacht Club	William Justice Strawbridge syndicate, Intrepid	4–1	Sir Frank Packer, Gretel II	(Australia) Royal Sydney Yacht Squadron
12 Metre	1974	Newport	(United States) New York Yacht Club	Robert Willis McCullough syndicate, Courageous	4–0	Alan Bond, Southern Cross	(Australia) Royal Perth Yacht Club
12 Metre	1977	Newport	(United States) New York Yacht Club	Ted Turner, Courageous	4–0	Alan Bond, Australia	(Australia) Sun City Yacht Club
12 Metre	1980	Newport	(United States) New York Yacht Club	Freedom syndicate, Freedom	4–1	Alan Bond, Australia	(Australia) Royal Perth Yacht Club
12 Metre	1983	Newport	(United States) New York Yacht Club	Freedom syndicate, Liberty	3–4	Alan Bond, Australia II	(Australia) Royal Perth Yacht Club
12 Metre	1987	Fremantle	(Australia) Royal Perth Yacht Club	Kevin Parry, Kookaburra III	0–4	Sail America, Stars & Stripes 87	(United States) San Diego Yacht Club
DOG match	1988	San Diego	(United States) San Diego Yacht Club	Sail America, Stars & Stripes 88	2–0	Fay Richwhite, KZ-1 New Zealand	(New Zealand) Mercury Bay Boating Club
IACC	1992	San Diego	(United States) San Diego Yacht Club	Bill Koch, America^{3}	4–1	Raul Gardini, Il Moro di Venezia	(Italy) Compagnia della Vela
IACC	1995	San Diego	(United States) San Diego Yacht Club	Sail America, Young America	0–5	Team New Zealand, Black Magic	Royal New Zealand Yacht Squadron
IACC	2000	Auckland	Royal New Zealand Yacht Squadron	Team New Zealand, NZL-60	5–0	Prada Challenge, Luna Rossa	(Italy) Yacht Club Punta Ala
IACC	2003	Auckland	Royal New Zealand Yacht Squadron	Team New Zealand, NZL 82	0–5	Alinghi, SUI-64	(Switzerland) Société Nautique de Genève
IACC	2007	Valencia	(Switzerland) Société Nautique de Genève	Alinghi, SUI-100	5–2	Team New Zealand, NZL-92	Royal New Zealand Yacht Squadron
DOG match	2010	Valencia	(Switzerland) Société Nautique de Genève	Alinghi, Alinghi 5	0–2	BMW Oracle Racing, USA-17	(United States) Golden Gate Yacht Club
AC72	2013	San Francisco	(United States) Golden Gate Yacht Club	Oracle Team USA, Oracle Team USA 17	9–8 (Note: Oracle Team USA, representing the Golden Gate Yacht Club, started the 2013 first-to-win-nine-races match with a two-race deficit due to a penalty applied for modifications to the team's AC45-class yachts during the America's Cup World Series (ACWS). The modifications were held to be an intentional violation of the AC45 one-design rules, and as the ACWS was deemed to be a part of the America's Cup event, a penalty was assessed against Oracle Team USA in the America's Cup Match.)	Team New Zealand, Aotearoa	Royal New Zealand Yacht Squadron
AC50	2017	Bermuda	(United States) Golden Gate Yacht Club	Oracle Team USA, 17	1–7 (Note: Team New Zealand started the match on −1 due to Oracle's victory in the Qualifier round robins)	Team New Zealand, Aotearoa	Royal New Zealand Yacht Squadron
AC75	2021	Auckland	Royal New Zealand Yacht Squadron	Emirates Team New Zealand, Te Rehutai	7–3	Luna Rossa Prada Pirelli, Luna Rossa	(Italy) Circolo della Vela Sicilia
AC75	2024	Barcelona	Royal New Zealand Yacht Squadron	Emirates Team New Zealand, Taihoro	7–2	INEOS Britannia, Britannia RB3	(United Kingdom) Royal Yacht Squadron
AC75	2027	Naples	Royal New Zealand Yacht Squadron	Emirates Team New Zealand		TBD	TBD

== Records of winning clubs and skippers ==
The following are lists of the America's Cup winning clubs and winning skippers:

=== Winning clubs ===
Club	Home	Won	Lost
New York Yacht Club	(United States)	25	1
Royal New Zealand Yacht Squadron	(New Zealand)	5	3
San Diego Yacht Club	(United States)	3	1
Société Nautique de Genève	(Switzerland)	2	1
Golden Gate Yacht Club	(United States)	2	1
Royal Perth Yacht Club	(Australia)	1	3

=== Multi-Cup Winning Skippers ===
Home	Name	Won	Lost	Cup Victories
(New Zealand)	Russell Coutts	14	0	1995, 2000, 2003
(United States)	Dennis Conner	13	9	1980, 1987, 1988
(United States)	Harold Stirling Vanderbilt	12	2	1930, 1934, 1937
(United States)	Charlie Barr	9	0	1899, 1901, 1903
(New Zealand)	Peter Burling	22	6	2017, 2021, 2024
(Australia)	Jimmy Spithill	17	23	2010, 2013

Note: With the exception of Jimmy Spithill, racing for an American syndicate, all skippers were winners on a yacht from their own country.

== In popular culture ==
In 1928, Goodyear chairman Paul W. Litchfield began a tradition of naming the company's blimps after America's Cup yachts, including America, Puritan, Mayflower, Volunteer, Vigilant, Defender, Reliance, Resolute, Enterprise, Rainbow, Ranger, Columbia and Stars & Stripes.

The 1992 Carroll Ballard film Wind starred Matthew Modine, Jennifer Grey and Cliff Robertson. The film fictionalizes Dennis Conner's 1983 Cup loss and 1987 comeback. Cup skipper Peter Gilmour was the film's sailing master and three 12 Meter's - US21, US42 and US46 America II were used onscreen. Lastly, long time America's Cup commentator Peter Montgomery produced fictional broadcast coverage of all Cup races in the film.

The documentary The Wind Gods: 33rd America's Cup (2011) centers around Oracle Team USA's efforts to challenge for the 33rd America's Cup. David Ellison collaborated with American journalist Julian Guthrie on the film; Guthrie later authored The Billionaire and the Mechanic, a non-fiction book detailing the history of Oracle Team USA.

The parody film Return of the Killer Tomatoes (1988) included background TV coverage of "Full Contact America's Cup" yacht racing.

In 2021, Australian psychedelic rock band Pond released a single titled America's Cup. The song centres around the gentrification of Western Australia and Fremantle, the host city of the 1987 America's Cup, after Australia's victory of the 1983 America's Cup with the yacht Australia II. The music video prominently features the America's Cup trophy being 'auctioned' off to the highest bidder.

Netflix released Untold: The Race of the Century (2022), a film about the Australian team's win in the 1983 race.

In June of 2026 the film Mighty Mary was released at the Nantucket Film Festival. It details the events surrounding Bill Koch’s boat America 3 and the first all women’s Americas Cup Team.

== See also ==
- America's Cup Hall of Fame
- Defender (America's Cup)
- Challenger (America's Cup)
- Citizen Cup awarded in the defenders series for the America's Cup in 1987, 1992 and 1995.
- Little Americas Cup
- Thames Sailing Barge Match
- Italy at the America's Cup

== Bibliography ==
- Chevalier, François; Taglang, Jacques (1987). America's Cup Yacht Designs, 1851–1986. Paris, France: François Chevalier & Jacques Taglang. ISBN 978-2-9502105-0-0. LCCN 88214406. OL 2143913M.
