= Bay of Quinte Yacht Club =

Boating club in Belleville, Ontario

- Burgee of the Bay of Quinte Yacht Club
- Abbreviation: BQYC
- Legal status: active
- Purpose: advocate and public voice, educator and network for recreational and competitive sailors, coaches, volunteers and events
- Headquarters: Belleville, Ontario, Canada
- Official language: English, French
- Affiliations: Britannia Yacht Club
- Website: www.bqyc.ca

Bay of Quinte Yacht Club is a boating club based in Belleville, Ontario, Canada, located on the shores of the Bay of Quinte. It was founded in 1876 and unsuccessfully challenged for the America's Cup in 1881.

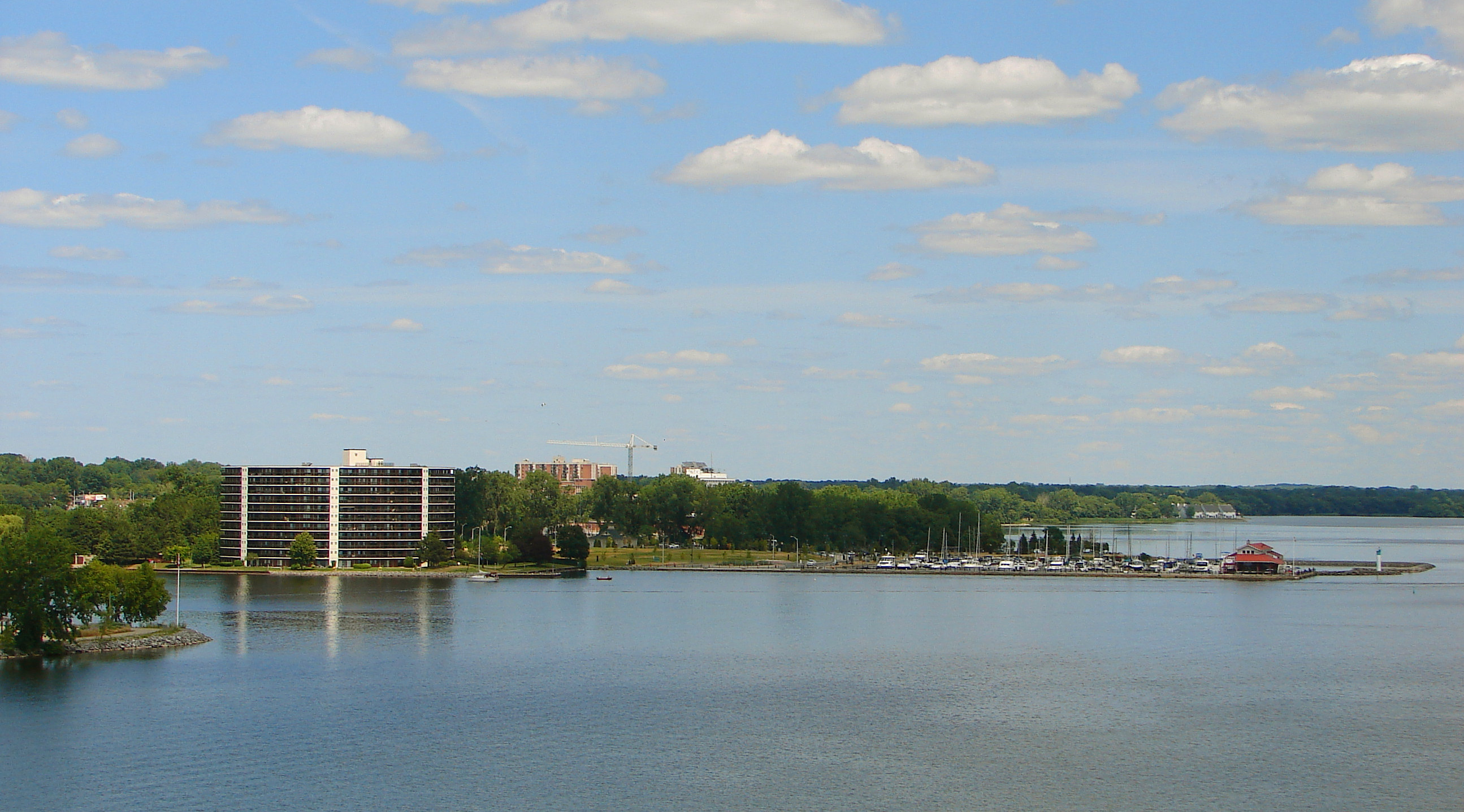
Marina of Bay of Quinte Yacht Club in Belleville
