= Genesta =

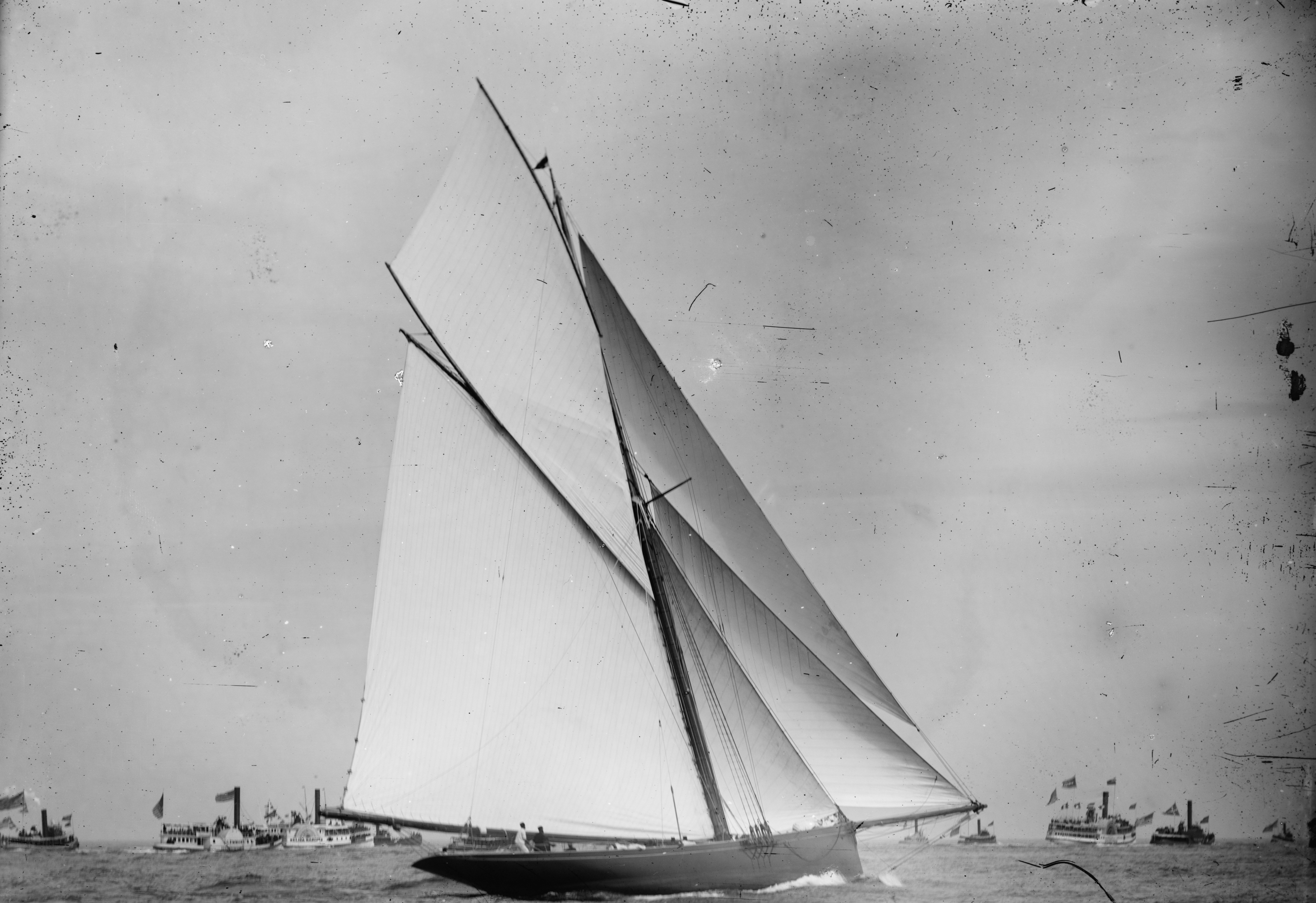
- Genesta
- Yacht club: Royal Yacht Squadron
- Nation: United Kingdom
- Designer(s): John Beavor-Webb
- Builder: D. and W. Henderson and Company, Glasgow, Scotland
- Launched: 1884
- Owner(s): Sir Richard Sutton
- Fate: Broken up in 1900

Racing career
- Skippers: John Carter
- Notable victories: Brenton Reef Cup; Cape May Challenge Cup; inaugural Round Britain Race (1887)
- America's Cup: 1885

Specifications
- Type: Cutter, converted to yawl
- Displacement: 141 tons
- Length: 29.45 m (96.6 ft) (LOA); 24.7 m (81 ft) (LWL)
- Beam: 4.57 m (15.0 ft)
- Draft: 4.09 m (13.4 ft)

Genesta was the unsuccessful English challenger in the fifth America's Cup in 1885 against the American defender Puritan.

== Design ==
The cutter Genesta was designed by John Beavor-Webb and built by the D&W Henderson shipyard on the River Clyde in 1884, for owner Sir Richard Sutton, 5th Baronet, of the Royal Yacht Squadron, Cowes, Isle of Wight, England. She was built of oak planking on a steel frame. John Carter skippered Genesta. She measured 81 feet 7 inches (24.87 m), weighing 80 tons.

== Career ==
After a strong showing in the British yacht races in 1884, Sutton crossed the Atlantic Ocean to New York during the summer of 1885 aboard Genesta. Upon arrival, designer Beavor-Webb refused to let anyone see his yacht before the America's Cup race, beginning the tradition of secrecy which was overruled by the organisers for the 2017 event.

After the Cup races, Sutton and Genesta won the Brenton Reef Cup, the Cape May Challenge Cup, and, upon returning to Britain, the first Round Britain Race in 1887, covering the 1,590-mile (2,560 km) course in 12 days, 16 hours, and 59 minutes. Genesta was sold and converted to a yawl by the 1890s and broken up in 1900.

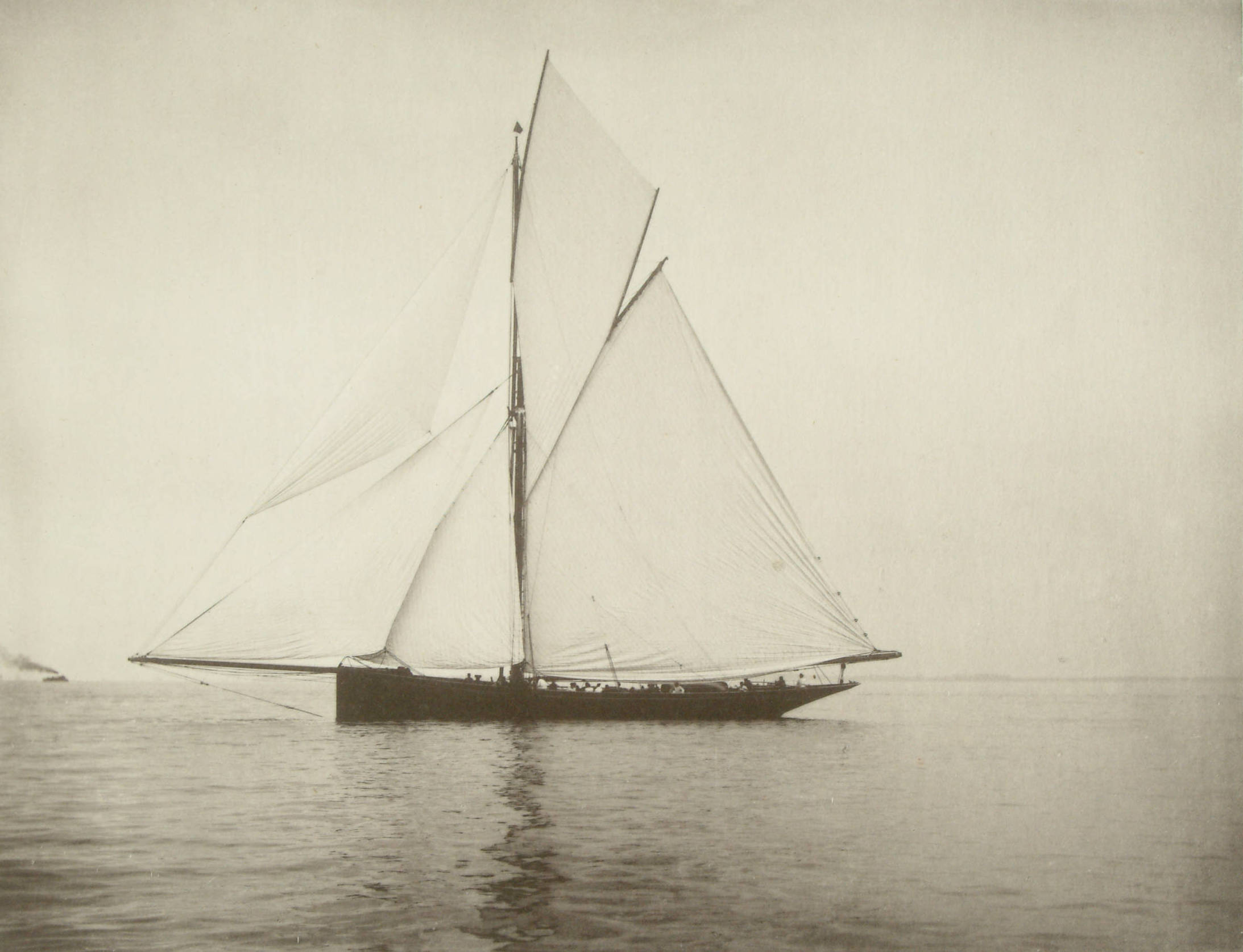
Genesta as photographed by Nathaniel Livermore Stebbins.

== References and external links ==
- America's Cup's Ac-clopaedia
- The 19th-Century Yacht Photography of J.S. Johnston
