= Horacio Carabelli =

Uruguayan-Brazilian engineer and sailor

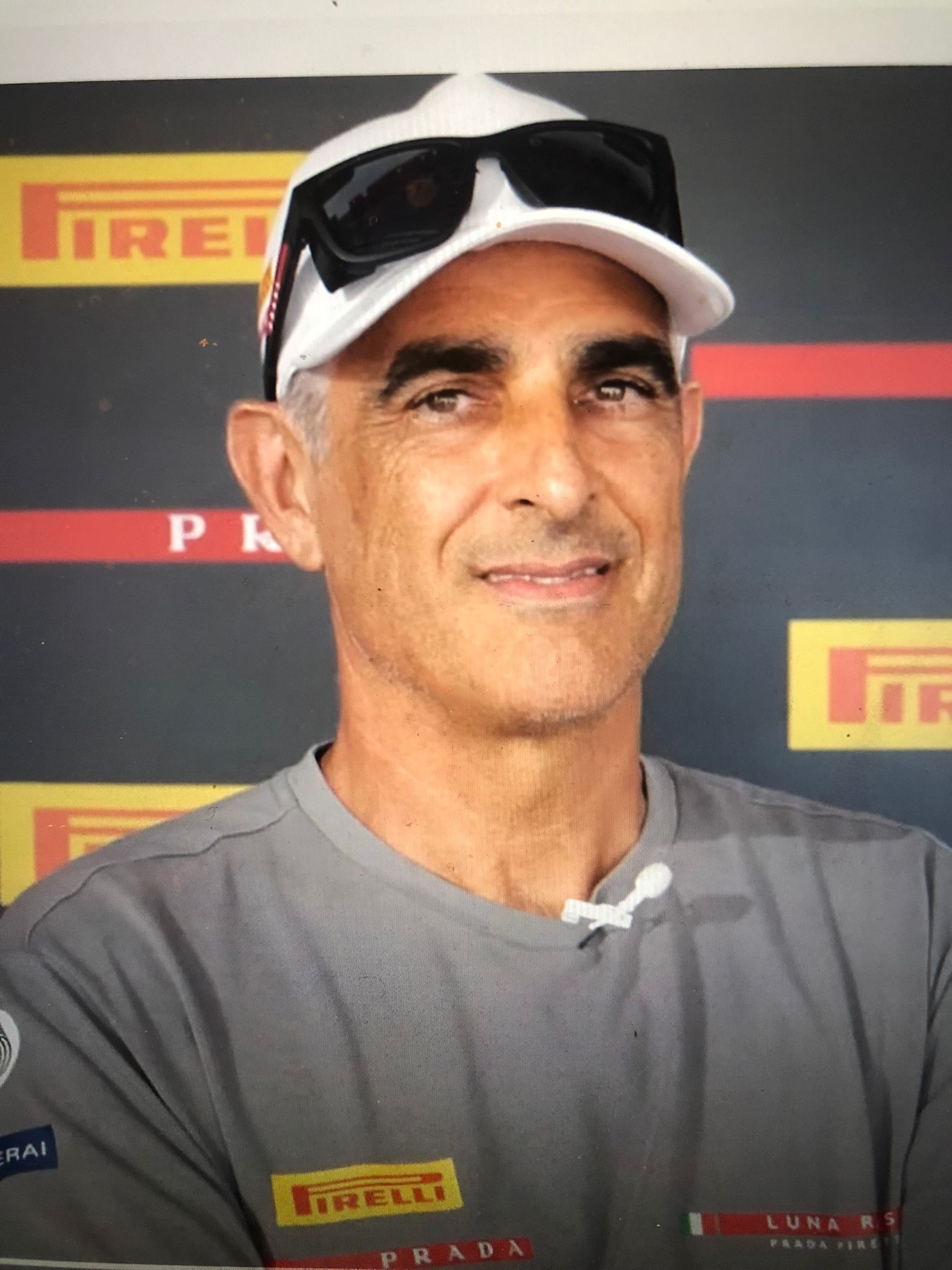
- Horacio Carabelli

Personal information
- Full name: Horacio Nicolás Carabelli Mari
- Nationality: Brazil Uruguay Italy
- Born: 10 February 1968 (age 58) Montevideo, Uruguay
- Education: Universidade Federal de Santa Catarina
- Occupation(s): Sailor, engineer and yacht designer
- Website: www.carabelli.com.br

Sport
- Country: International
- Sport: Sailing

Sailing career
- Class(es): America's Cup 75, America's Cup 50, Volvo Open 70, ILC25, Multimar 32, Snipe, Soling, Star, Carabelli 30

Achievements and titles
- Olympic finals: Seoul 1988
- World finals: Ocean Race, America's Cup
Medal record
Sailing
Representing UruguayBrazilItalySweden
Foiling awards
Gold medal – first place	2022	AC 75 Luna Rossa Prada Pirelli Team
Ocean Race
Gold medal – first place	2008-09	VO 70 Ericsson Team
Bronze medal – third place	2005-26	VO 70 Brazil's Team
World Championships
Bronze medal – third place	1987 La Rochelle	Snipe
South American Championships
Gold medal – first place	1990 Buenos Aires	Snipe
Silver medal – second place	1988 Florianópolis	Snipe
Silver medal – second place	1992 Porto Alegre	Snipe
World Junior Championships
Gold medal – first place	1984 Montevideo	Snipe
Gold medal – first place	1986 Lago di Garda	Snipe

Horacio Carabelli (born 10 February 1968 in Montevideo, Uruguay) is an international sailor and engineer.

== Early life ==
Horacio Carabelli was born in Montevideo, Uruguay in a family of sailors. Son of an Argentine boat builder, Anibal Horacio Carabelli, and grandson of a Uruguayan naval captain, Carlos Mari, Horacio grew sailing at the Yacht Club Uruguayo. As a child his hobby was to build very detailed ship and plane models. At the age of eight, he started participating in national and international competitions in the Optimist sailing class. During his adolescence he sailed in Snipe class with Luis Chiaparro first and Christopher Shewe afterwards, competing in Snipe World Championships where he obtained the Vieri Lasinio Di Castelvero Trophy in two consecutive World Junior Championships (1984 and 1986).

Horacio and Luis Chiaparro also obtained the third place in the Open World Championship in La Rochelle, France 1987. Horacio represented Uruguay in the Seoul 1988 Summer Olympics together with Luis Chiaparro and Heber Ansorena, sailing in the Soling Class.

After finishing his high school studies Horacio moved to Florianópolis, Brazil, where his father sailed and built boats. Once in Brazil, Horacio became a full member of the Iate Clube Santa Catarina, and continued sailing and working on his father's shipyard while studying naval design and engineering at the Universidade Federal de Santa Catarina (U.F.S.C). Horacio has continued his sailing career participating in many international championships in different sailing classes while designing and constructing boats. He is an international sailor who participated in three Round the World Volvo Ocean Race competitions, winning and earning a Guinness World Record in the 2010 edition with Ericsson 4 Team. He has been part of several America's Cup teams. In the role of Design coordinator, he won the Prada Cup together with Luna Rossa Prada Pirelli's team from Italy becoming the official challenger of the 36th edition of the America's Cup. He is still the Design Coordinator of Luna Rossa Prada Pirelli's team and is currently participating in the 37th edition of the America's Cup in Barcelona, Spain. In 2022 the Luna Rossa Prada Pirelli, chaired by Patrizio Bertelli, with Max Sirena as Team Director and Skipper, and Horacio as Design Coordinator, won the Foiling awards at the Museum of Science and Technology Leonardo Da Vinci in Milán.

== Sailing career ==
=== International Snipe class Sailing Championships ===
Horacio Carabelli obtained several awards in International Snipe World Championships:

- Two golden medals in two consecutive Snipe World Junior Championships: in 1984 in Montevideo, Uruguay with Luis Chiaparro and in 1986 at the Lago di Garda, Italy with Christopher Schewe
- Bronze medal together with Luis Chiaparro in the Snipe world Championship held in La Rochelle, France in 1987.

In 1990 Horacio Carabelli and Luis Chiaparro won the Snipe South American Championship held in Buenos Aires, Argentina and obtained two second places: in the Snipe South American Championships held in Florianópolis, Santa Catarina, Brazil in 1988; and in Porto Alegre, Río Grande do Sul, Brazil in 1992. Horacio also participated in the Pan American Games that were held in 1987 in Indianapolis, United States of America and in the North American Championship.

=== 1988 Summer Olympic Games ===
Horacio Carabelli participated in the 1988 Summer Olympic Games held in Seoul, South Korea, and obtained the 16th place together with crew members Luis Chiaparro and Heber Ansorena.

=== Round the world Volvo Ocean Race ===
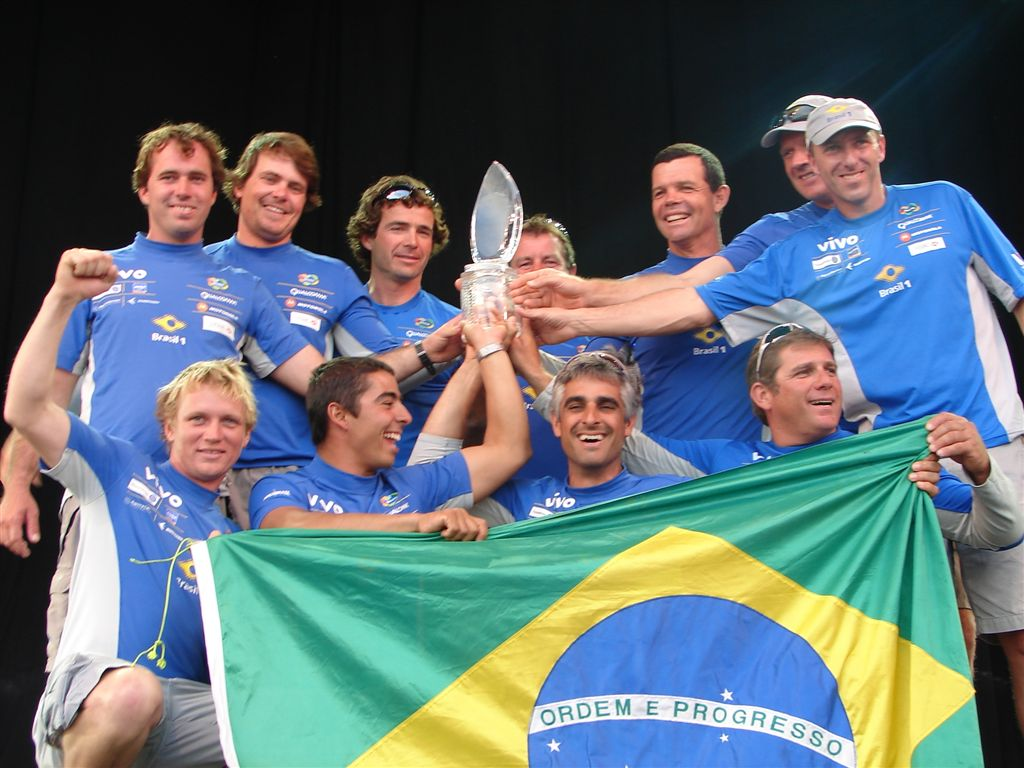
Team "Brasil 1" at the Volvo Ocean Race 2005–06 prize-giving ceremony.

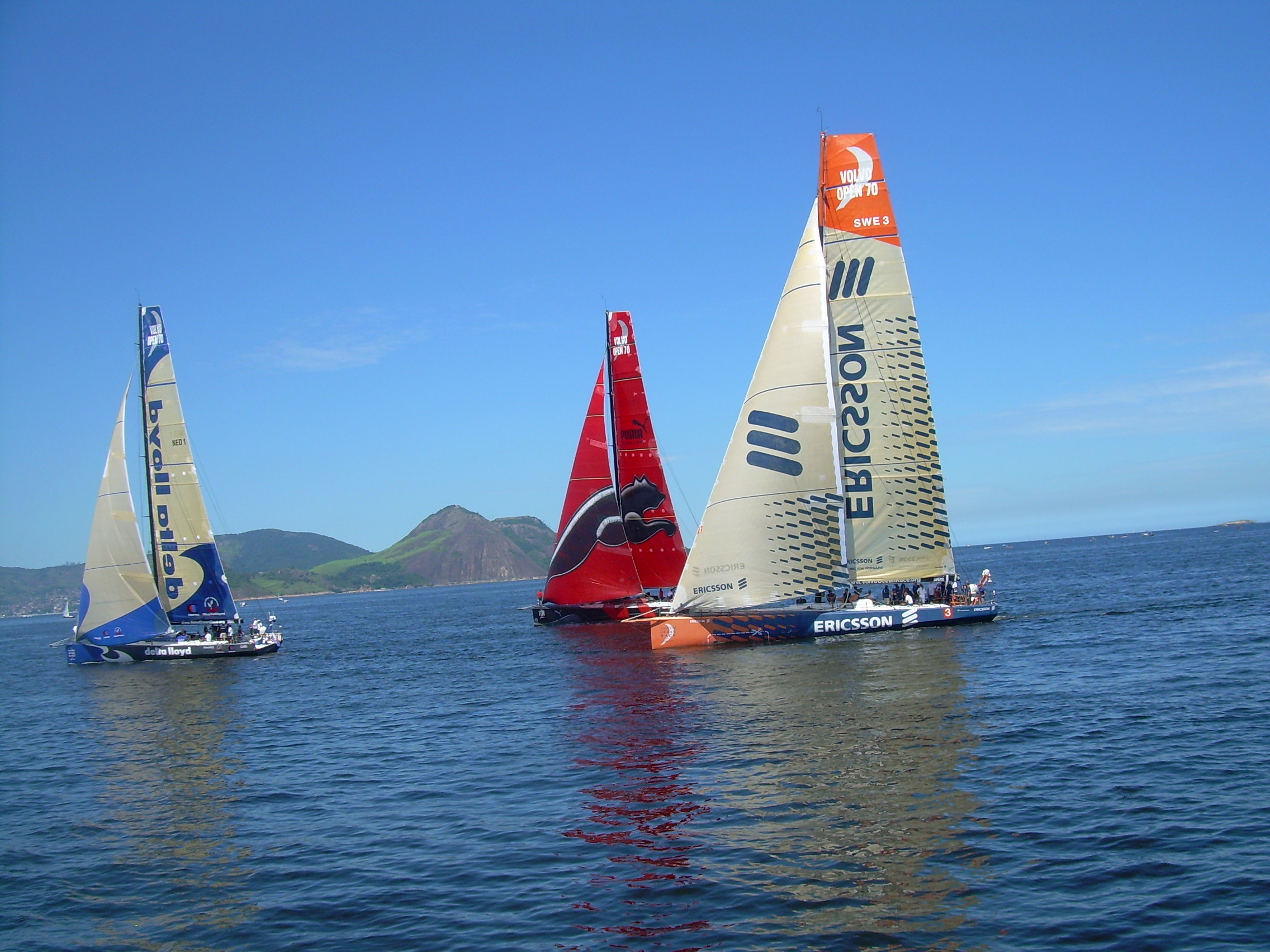
Ericsson 4 in Rio de Janeiro

Horacio Carabelli has participated in three Volvo Ocean Race editions. At the 2008–09 Volvo Ocean Race Horacio obtained the first place with the Ericsson 4 team commanded by Torben Grael together with Jules Salter, Guy Salter, Brad Jackson, Stu Bannatyne, Dave Endean, Joao Signorini, Ryan Godfre, Phil Jameson and Tony Mutter. After hard work, great enthusiasm and commitment throughout the race, the team established a new world record on the Volvo Ocean 70 class. They broke the world record for a monohull 24‑hour distance achieving 596.6 nautical miles (Distance of 596.6 nm and average speed of 24.85 knots).

Sailing reporter Felipe Caruso stated in Brazilian sailing magazine 'Náutica' :

"Carabelli is always focused on Ericsson' 4 sails: no one knows the boat commanded by Torben Grael around the world better than him (...) Torben Grael's first time companion, the brazilian-uruguayan Horacio Carabelli is, also, the spirit of the leadering boat of the Volvo Ocean Race."

During the 2005–06 Volvo Ocean Race Horacio Carabelli obtained the third place on board of the Brasil 1 vessel commanded by the skipper Torben Grael together with Alan Adler, André Fonseca, Andy Meiklejohn, Joca Signorini, Kiko Pellicano, Knud Frostad, Marcel Van Triest, Marcelo Ferreira, Roberto Bermúdez and Stuart Wilson. Horacio was Trimmer and Technical Director in the 'Brasil 1' team. He enjoyed sailing around the world and crossing Cape Horn for the first time with the "Brasil 1" team and, as skipper Torben Grael stated in the interview done by Murillo Novais: Horacio Carabelli's role in the team was essential.

In the Volvo Ocean Race 2011–12 edition Horacio was the Technical Director of Team Telefónica with Skipper Iker Martínez and the following crew: Andrew Cape, Xabi Fernández, Neal McDonald, Pepe Ribes, Jordi Calafat, Joao Signorini, Pablo Arrarte, Antonio Cuervas-Mons, Zane Gills and Diego Fructuoso. Team Telefónica obtained the fourth general place after very tight regatta results.

=== America's Cup ===
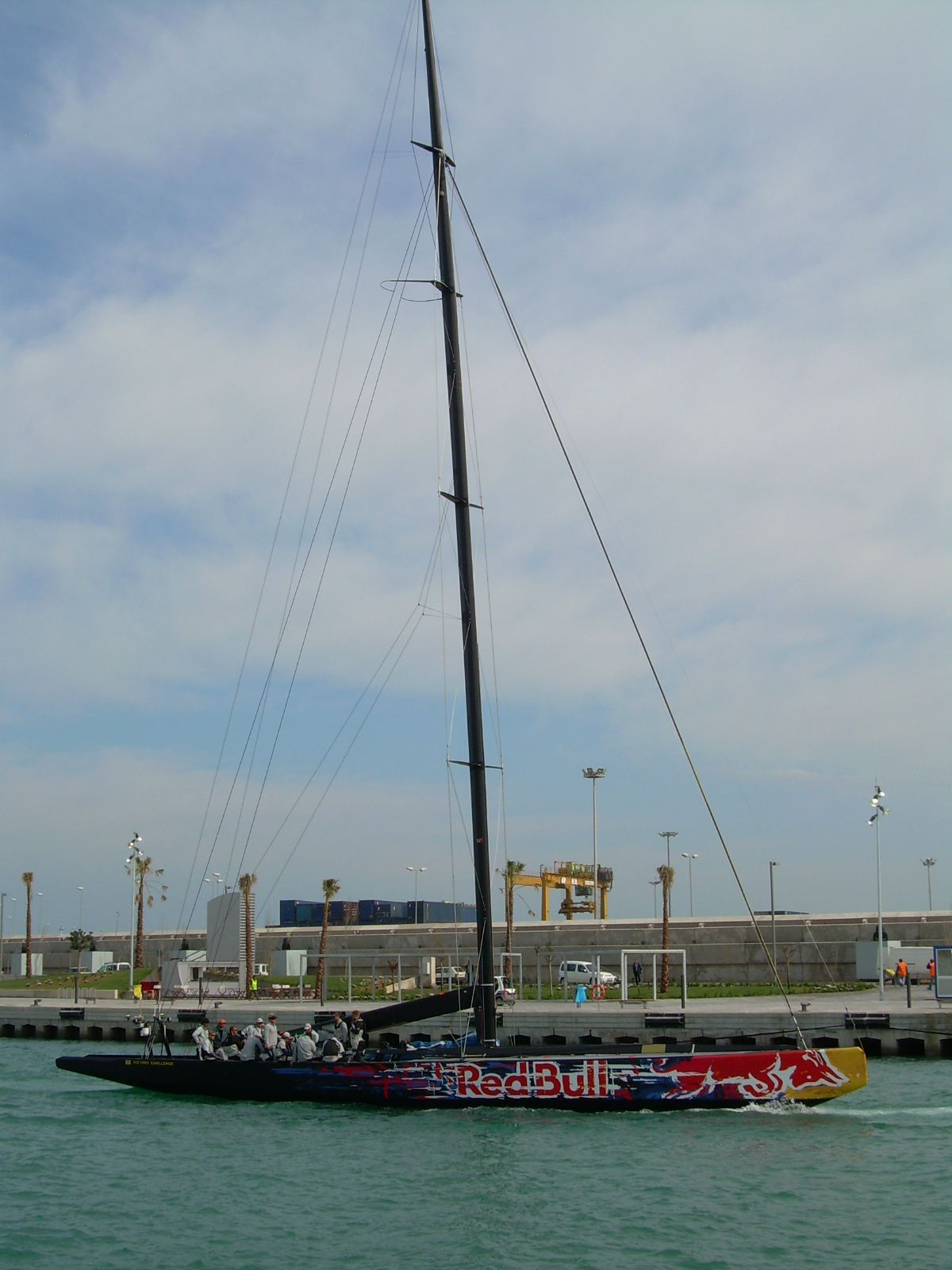
America's Cup 2006–07, Victory Challenge

Horacio Carabelli has participated in the America's Cup international regatta since 2006. During the 2007 edition held in Valencia, Spain, he was the Mast Department Manager and Special Projects developer of the Swedish team Victory Challenge managed by Hugo Stenbeck. In the 2013 edition which was held in San Francisco, California, United States of America, he was the Wing Project Manager for the Swedish team Artemis.

In 2014, he was the Construction Coordinator of Team Luna Rossa, from Italy, that challenged the Oracle Team from United States on the 34th America's Cup edition in San Francisco, California. As Team Luna Rossa could not participate in the following edition, Horacio was invited to participate in the 35th America's Cup, held in Bermuda, in the team led by the French skipper Franck Cammas:Groupama Sailing Team.

Horacio participated in the 36th America's Cup as the Co-Design Coordinator of Team Luna Rossa Prada Pirelli from Italy; team sponsored by Patrizio Bertelli, Prada's CEO, and directed by the skipper Max Sirena.Team Luna Rossa Prada Pirelli won the Prada Cup in this edition becoming the official challenger of Team New Zealand in this 36th America's Cup.

Horacio is participating in the 37th America's Cup, his 5th American Cup, as the Design Coordinator of Team Luna Rossa Prada Pirelli from Italy. Patrizio Bertelli is the chairman of Team Luna Rossa Prada Pirelli, and Max Sirena is its Team Director and Skipper. Around 150 people are part of this team, in the following sections: sailing team, youth & women team, design team, shore team, logistics and services team, and the administration and secretary team.

=== Brazilian Championships ===
Horacio has participated in several Brazilian Championships in different sailing classes: Optimist, Snipe, Laser, Star, Multimar 32, ILC25, among others. In 1999 his team – with Horacio as a skipper – obtained the first place at the IMS Brazilian Championship held in Ilhabela, São Paulo, Brazil in the Vmax4, ILC25.

== Boat design and building ==
As an engineer, Horacio Carabelli does not only integrate his engineering skills while sailing, he has also carried out projects, constructions and designs regarding different types of vessels: yachts, motor yachts, schooners, monohull ships and multihull yachts.

In yachting, Carabelli is well known for his Multimar 32' yacht project as the sailboats he designed have obtained important prizes in national and international IMS class competitions. Some of the Multimar 32 sailboats are: Gosto D'Água, Scirocco, Resgate, Mano a Mano, ESPN Brasil and Vmax. At the moment a Carabelli 30' sailing class is being made from his design by a Brazilian shipyard.

Between 2001 and 2004 Horacio Carabelli was in charge of the construction of a 156-foot motoryacht constructed by Abeking & Rasmussen Luxury Motor Yacht in Germany.

In 1997 he also designed and built his own ILC25 and many of the sailboats made won national and international championships.

Since 2006, Horacio has been part of the design team of several international teams that participate in the America's Cup. He is currently the Design Coordinator of Luna Rossa Prada Pirelli's AC75.

All in all, Horacio Carabelli has designed and built sailboats of several classes, among them:

- AC75 in Luna Rossa Prada Pirelli team/36th America's Cup
- AC50 in Groupama team/ 35th America's Cup
- 71´ Motor sailer
- 65´ Cold molded cruising schooner
- 56´ Fast Cruising Sailboat
- 54´ Fast Cruising Sailboat
- 53´ Fast Cruising Sailboat
- 45´ Full Carbon Fast Cruising Daysailer
- 42 IRC Sailboat
- 32´ RIB
- 37´ Lobster Motor Yacht
- 32´ IMS Racing Sailboat
- 25´ Cruiser/Racer Production Sailboat
- 25´ ILC/IMS Sailboat
- 23´ Sportboat
