= 2027 America's Cup =

Planned Yacht race

38th America's Cup

Defender New Zealand
- Defender club: Royal New Zealand Yacht Squadron
- Yacht: TBD

Challenger
- Yacht: TBD

Competition
- Location: Naples
- Dates: 10-18 July 2027
- Winner: TBD
- Score: TBD

The 2027 America's Cup will be the 38th staging of the America's Cup yacht race. It is the oldest continuous competition in international sport. It will be raced in a match-race series between a yacht sailed by Emirates Team New Zealand representing the defender Royal New Zealand Yacht Squadron, and a yacht representing the challenging yacht club. The challenging yacht club will either be the one which is first to issue a valid challenge to the defending club under the Deed of Gift of the America's Cup and becomes a sole challenger, or the one which wins a Challenger Series organised by the first valid challenger, which is called 'the Challenger of Record'. The Royal Yacht Squadron is the Challenger of Record for a second consecutive America's Cup.

== History ==
The America's Cup is a highly prestigious event, being the oldest continuous competition in international sport, and the fourth oldest continuous sporting trophy of any kind. As of 19 October 2024, a total of 37 Cup Matches have been held. With 25 victories, the New York Yacht Club has won the most titles.

The 37th America's Cup Match from 12 to 19 October 2024 was the Royal New Zealand Yacht Squadron's eighth America's Cup Match and their fifth America's Cup victory, winning in 1995, 2000, 2017, 2021 and 2024 (losing in 2003, 2007 and 2013) – making it the second most successful club, and Emirates Team New Zealand the most successful team, in the competition's history. RNZYS has appeared in every America's Cup Match since their first appearance in 1995 (apart from 2010, which was a Deed of Gift Match).

== Terms of challenge ==
=== Background ===
The Royal New Zealand Yacht Squadron is again the Defender of the America's Cup after its yacht Taihoro, owned and sailed by the Emirates Team New Zealand syndicate, was the successful Defender in the Louis Vuitton 37th America's Cup, beating the Challenger INEOS Britannia, representing the Royal Yacht Squadron, 7–2 in a first-to-seven series raced from 12 to 19 October 2024 in Barcelona, Spain.

Soon after Taihoro achieved its seventh win in the Louis Vuitton 37th America's Cup, Emirates Team New Zealand chief operating officer Kevin Shoebridge confirmed that a challenge had been accepted by the Royal New Zealand Yacht Squadron. INEOS Britannia (now Athena Racing) skipper and team boss Ben Ainslie later confirmed that the Royal Yacht Squadron in Cowes had indeed challenged the Louis Vuitton 38th America's Cup and their challenge had been accepted. Royal Yacht Squadron Racing Ltd. is now the Challenger of Record for a second consecutive America's Cup.

=== Terms of RYS Challenge ===
==== Planned equipment ====
Royal Yacht Squadron Racing Ltd and Royal New Zealand Yacht Squadron agreed in the challenge after the 36th America's Cup that the AC75 foiling monohull class developed would be used for the 2024 America's Cup, they also want the AC75 class to be used for the 38th America's Cup, perhaps with a slightly modified rule involving less automation in exchange for more sailors doing sailing roles, possibly making space for a crew role reserved for female or youth sailors.

On 8 November 2024, RNZYS and RYS released a statement that: the AC75 class will be retained however the next Cup will not be until 2027 and the rule is launching a restriction on the sailing of AC75 yachts for 12 months – along with a cap on sailing days of AC75s. It is not yet certain how this would work for new teams who need sailing time in existing AC75s. Development of LEQ12s is also prohibited however, development can take place on AC40s which remains "in class". The defender and challenger of record are investigating the possibility of imposing cost and carbon "caps".

In a final draft protocol released 23 May 2025, the AC75s will be completely powered by batteries, and manual power (either by grinder or cyclor) is prohibited. The crew size has been increased to six, four of which are open crew positions and the other two reserved for Youth (below 25 years of age) and a female crew member (without age restriction). All functions on board the AC75 will be battery-powered, with more details expected in the publication of the AC75 Class Rule, where the weight difference will be clarified.

The Protocol also allows the "sale or transfer of design information and technology between Competitors is permitted but there shall be no sale or transfer of performance data between Competitors." This keeps the door open for teams to purchase basic design packages off other teams, (as the French did in the 2024), however, the sharing of performance information remains prohibited.

The protocol appears to have a clause which bonds competitors to agree to using the AC75 class for AC39, or risk forfeiting US$20 million.

==== Nationality rules ====
In the statement released on 8 November, there were no real changes to nationality rules.

The final draft protocol includes some changes to the nationality rules. The rumoured "Burling clause" is included, meaning that a maximum of two non-nationals may participate as crew in a race during the AC38 Events, provided that they did not participate in the AC37 Final Preliminary Regatta, the Challenger Selection Series or the AC37 Match.” A waiver to the nationality rule has also been included, "for a particular crew member who they are satisfied was unable to fully comply with those requirements only due to circumstances outside his/her control such as the COVID-19 pandemic."

==== Venue ====
Speculation centred around Jeddah in Saudi Arabia or Valencia in Spain or Auckland, which hosted four times in total, 30th, 31st, 35th and 36th editions respectively. Notion of returning to Barcelona was once conjectured, but was ultimately rejected by both Team New Zealand CEO Grant Dalton and council of the Catalan capital. Dalton mentioned the difficulties for further expansion of participating teams under available infrastructure within the city port. City council was satisfied enough with the unique event in 37th edition due to enormous economical and promotional impacts. It was later reported that the Port of Barcelona recorded a financial loss of €3.5 million having spent €4.5 million between 2022 and 2024. However, the study done by the University of Barcelona and the Barcelona Capital Nàutica Foundation (FBCN) revealed over €1 billion positive economic GDP return that the Louis Vuitton 37th America's Cup created for the host venue Barcelona and the wider region of Catalonia.

However, on 1 April 2025 Emirates Team New Zealand announced a decision by the Ministry of Business, Innovation and Employment and Central Government not to back the 38th America's Cup in Auckland in 2027.

Of the previous 37 Cup Matches, 33 have been held in the Defender's home waters. The Deed of Gift provides for the Defender to name the venue if they and the Challenger of Record cannot reach agreement. The venue is to be announced by the Defender within eight months of the final race of the AC37 Match (20 June 2025) and a Protocol should also be published as soon as practicable within that period and a Protocol will follow.

On 15 May Emirates Team New Zealand, along with the Government of Italy announced that the 2027 matches would take place in Naples, Italy. However, this has a number of potential competitors concerned about a lack of transparency. Athena Racing released a statement saying it is concerned about the recent announcement of a Host City and the impact on the main goal of negotiating a fair sporting protocol. Previously, host agreements have followed publication of the agreed protocol (between the Defender and the Challenger of Record). In the absence of an agreed Protocol, it is unclear what exactly has been agreed between Emirates Team New Zealand and the Italian government, as the sporting framework and details of the event do not yet exist. American Magic have also voiced their concerns, saying "the Defender has been unwilling to commit to the transparency and cooperation necessary to secure a fair Protocol."

Emirates Team New Zealand have responded to these accusations stating, “The latest version of the Protocol went back to the Challenger of Record Athena Racing, 10 days ago, prior to the announcement of Naples. The Defender has not had any feedback back from the Challenger of Record on the latest version other than acknowledgement it had been well received by the teams.”

==== Dates ====
Team New Zealand CEO Grant Dalton planned to make the competition more commercially viable, indicating that he favoured 2026, one year earlier than expected for quick turnaround and use of the hard assets that the six current teams in possession: AC40, AC75, hydrogen chase boats, simulators and gym equipment. Meanwhile, it will be more beneficial to retain the respective sailing talents.

The Deed of Gift requires the Match to be held in summer or summer-shoulder months. In the southern hemisphere, this is defined as between 1 November and 30 April. In the northern hemisphere, it is defined as between 1 May and 31 October.

Key dates in the draft Protocol released May 2025 include the rule that nobody can sail an AC75 until 15 January 2026. The intention is to run up to three Initial Preliminary Regattas during 2026 and one possibly in early 2027, with a final Preliminary Regatta at the Match Venue. These Preliminary events will be raced in AC40s in 2026 (with each Competitor able to enter two AC40s). In 2027, the Preliminary Regattas will be raced in AC75s, "competing in the same AC75 Yacht hull in which Competitors shall compete during the Challenger Selection Series (CSS) and the Match". The Defender will again be eligible to compete in the early stage of the Challenger Series, but not the Semi-Final or Final.

==== Youth and Women's America's Cup ====
The Women's and Youth America's Cups are set to return. A Notice of Race for the Youth and Women's AC Regattas will be published by the Event Authority not less than 12 months prior to the first race in either regatta. it shall be a condition of eligibility for the AC37 Events that Competitors enter and compete in the Youth and Women's AC Regattas representing the country of its yacht club. It is intended that crew members aged 25 years and under on the date of the first race of the Match shall be eligible to compete in the Youth AC. There shall be no age restriction for the Women's AC. 100% of the crew sailing on each yacht shall be nationals of the Competitor's Country. If teams from other countries (not represented by the Competitors) are invited for the Women's or Youth AC, all crew on those teams shall be nationals of the country the team represents.

==== New cup organisation ====
The Defender, COR and other prospective competitors have reached agreement for the establishment of a partnership (the America's Cup Partnership; ACP) of founding teams to be responsible for the management of the 38th America's Cup and future cycles. It is agreed that ACP or its designated entity will be appointed as the Event Authority for the 38th America's Cup and commence operation as soon as practicable. "ACP shall be bound by all pre-existing commitments in respect of AC38 matters which are contracted or otherwise agreed by ACE in the course of negotiation before ACP's commencement of operation." Some of the sweeping responsibilities of the ACP are listed, including management of timing and format, commercial and media rights and "endeavouring to raise funds, to meet its costs of AC38."

== Teams ==
The Royal Yacht Squadron is the Challenger of Record for the Louis Vuitton 38th America's Cup. Their team, INEOS Britannia (now Athena Racing), previously lost to Emirates Team New Zealand 7–2 in the 2024 Match, beating Luna Rossa Prada Pirelli in the 2024 Louis Vuitton Cup Final by 7–4.

After a split in January 2025 between Ben Ainslie and INEOS Britannia, Ainslie said his challenge will return to its Athena Racing identity going forward, aligning with the British Women's and Youth America's Cup team. RYS updated their website confirming that "Athena Racing represents Royal Yacht Squadron – the British entry for the 38th America's Cup led by Sir Ben Ainslie." In April 2025, INEOS Britannia withdrew from the 38th America's Cup. In January 2026, Athena Sports Group announced GB1 as the new identity for their challenge for the 38th America's Cup, with Dylan Fletcher confirmed as Helm, Ben Ainslie as Team Principal and Ian Walker as CEO.

Three-time winning skipper Peter Burling parted ways with Emirates Team New Zealand after failing to reach an agreement for the 38th America's Cup. In June 2025 it was announced that Burling had joined prospective Challenger Luna Rossa.

Luna Rossa have announced that they will be representing the club Circolo del Remo e della Vela Italia.

K-Challenge will be representing the Société Nautique de Saint Tropez, marking France's 15th participation in the Americas Cup. In March 2026, the team rebranded as La Roche-Posay Racing Team, extending their sponsorship agreement with L'Oréal group.

Having withdrawn from AC38 in mid 2025, Ernesto Bertarelli's syndicate rejoined following the announcement of the ACP. Switzerland will therefore be represented by Tudor Team Alinghi (formerly Alinghi Red Bull Racing), representing the Société Nautique de Genève. This marks the end of their AC37 technical partnership with Red Bull Racing, with Tudor Watches continuing with the team into AC38.

On April 9, 2026, American Racing Challenger Team USA, representing Sail Newport, confirmed they will enter the 2027 competition, having purchased American Magic's key hardware, including the AC75 yacht Patriot and two AC40 training platforms.

Team Australian Challenge announced it's entry on May 14 2026, representing Royal Prince Edward Yacht Club and backed by John Winning Jnr. The team will be skippered by Tom Slingsby (also Head of Sailing), supported by Glenn Ashby as Head of Performance and Design, having purchased 'Te Rehutai', ETNZ's winning AC75 used in the 2021 America's Cup. Grant Simmer was announced as CEO. The campaign draws on experience in the Andoo-backed campaign for the 2024 Women's & Youth Americas Cup events, as well as the Andoo Comanche super-maxi offshore racing programme.

Team	Yacht Club	CEO / Team Principal	Skipper	AC75 Name	Shipyard	Unveiled	Launched	Notes
Emirates Team New Zealand Defender	Royal New Zealand Yacht Squadron	(New Zealand) Grant Dalton	(Australia) Nathan Outteridge	Taihoro	Team New Zealand	9 March 2026	13 March 2026	
(United Kingdom) GB1 Challenger of Record	Royal Yacht Squadron	(United Kingdom) Sir Ben Ainslie (United Kingdom) Ian Walker	(United Kingdom) Dylan Fletcher	RB3	Carrington Boats			
(Italy) Luna Rossa Prada Pirelli	Circolo del Remo e della Vela Italia	(Italy) Max Sirena		Luna Rossa	Persico Marine		10 June 2026	
(France) La Roche-Posay Racing Team	Société Nautique de Saint-Tropez	(France) Stephan Kandler (France) Bruno Dubois	(France) Quentin Delapierre	Orient Express	Multiplast	29 June 2026	30 June 2026	
(Switzerland) TudorTeam Alinghi	Société Nautique de Genève	(Switzerland) Ernesto Bertarelli	(United Kingdom) Paul Goodison	BoatOne	Alinghi			
(United States) American Racing Challenger Team USA	Sail Newport	(United States) Ken Read	(United Kingdom) Giles Scott	Patriot	American Magic			
(Australia) Team Australian Challenge	Royal Prince Edward Yacht Club	(Australia) Grant Simmer	(Australia) Tom Slingsby	Te Rehutai	Team New Zealand			

== Preliminary Regattas ==
It is intended to hold four Preliminary Regattas – three in 2026, and one in 2027. The pre-events will see a mix of AC40 fleet racing during the 2026 regattas, and AC75 racing in the Preliminary Regatta in 2027. As a change from the previous edition, each team will now be allowed to field a second AC40 during the Preliminary Regattas, as long as the boat is crewed by team members of the respective Women's and Youth teams.

In Jan 2026 it was confirmed that the first preliminary regatta of AC38 will take place in Cagliari, Sardinia, on 21–24 May 2026 in the one-design AC40s. Up to 10 races are planned over four days, with the top two teams then racing in a deciding winner-takes-all single match.

== Qualifying event ==
AC38 will be a multi-challenger event and having lodged the first challenge the Royal Yacht Squadron has been appointed the role of Challenger of Record.

== Cup match ==
The America's Cup match will be a best of 13 race series to be held between the Emirates Team New Zealand syndicate representing the Royal New Zealand Yacht Squadron, and the winner of the qualifying event.

The 38th cup match will start on 10 July 2027 and will be wrapped up by 17–18 July 2027.

Races won
Team	1	2	3	4	5	6	7	8	9	10	11	13	Total
Emirates Team New Zealand													
TBD													

== Youth and Women's Americas Cup ==
According to the Protocol published on 12 August 2025, both RNZYS and RYS are committed to building on the success of the Women's and Youth America's Cup events.

Hannah Mills has been confirmed as helm for the second edition of the Women's America's Cup and Team Principal for the British women's and youth Athena Pathway Programme.

On 21 Jan 2026 in Naples, Mills also opened the British application process for the Youth Team.
