= Luna Rossa Prada Pirelli =

Italian sailboat racing syndicate

Luna Rossa

Career
- Yacht club: Yacht Club Punta Ala (1997–2003); Yacht Club Italiano (2003–2007); Circolo della Vela Sicilia (2011–2025); Circolo del Remo e della Vela Italia (2025–)
- Established: 1997
- Nation: Italy
- Team principal(s): Patrizio Bertelli
- Skipper: Francesco de Angelis (1997–2007); Max Sirena (2011–)
- Notable sailors: Torben Grael; James Spithill; Francesco Bruni
- Notable victories: 2000 Louis Vuitton Cup; 2011 Extreme Sailing Series; 2021 Prada Cup; 2024 Unicredit Youth America's Cup; 2024 Puig Women's America's Cup

Yachts
- Sail no.: Boat name
- ITA–45: Luna Rossa
- ITA–48: Luna Rossa
- ITA–74: Luna Rossa
- ITA–80: Luna Rossa
- ITA–86: Luna Rossa
- ITA–94: Luna Rossa

Luna Rossa Prada Pirelli, originally named Prada Challenge, then Luna Rossa Challenge, is an Italian sailboat racing syndicate first created to compete for the 2000 America's Cup. It won the Louis Vuitton Cup in 2000 on its first attempt, but then lost the America's Cup match against the defending champion team, Team New Zealand.

Luna Rossa challenged again for the 2003 America's Cup but was knocked out in the semi-finals stage of the Louis Vuitton Cup. In the 2007 America's Cup, held in Valencia, Spain, the team reached the final of the Louis Vuitton Cup but was again defeated by Team New Zealand.

When the competition moved to AC72 catamarans for the 2013 America's Cup, held in San Francisco, Luna Rossa was the last team to challenge, entering a partnership with Team New Zealand. The Italian team reached the final of the Louis Vuitton Cup, losing to the Kiwi team. While Luna Rossa planned to participate in the 2017 America's Cup, setting up a new base in Cagliari and starting development on the new boat, it withdrew from the competition in protest of the decision to switch the class of yachts to the AC50 catamaran.

After Team New Zealand won the Cup back in 2017, Luna Rossa issued their challenge for the next edition, becoming the Challenger of Record for the 2021 America's Cup; after winning the Prada Cup, it lost 7-3 against the Kiwis.

The team is owned by Prada CEO Patrizio Bertelli and it is sponsored by that Italian fashion brand. Additional sponsors were Telecom Italia between 2005 and 2007 and Pirelli from 2018.

== History ==
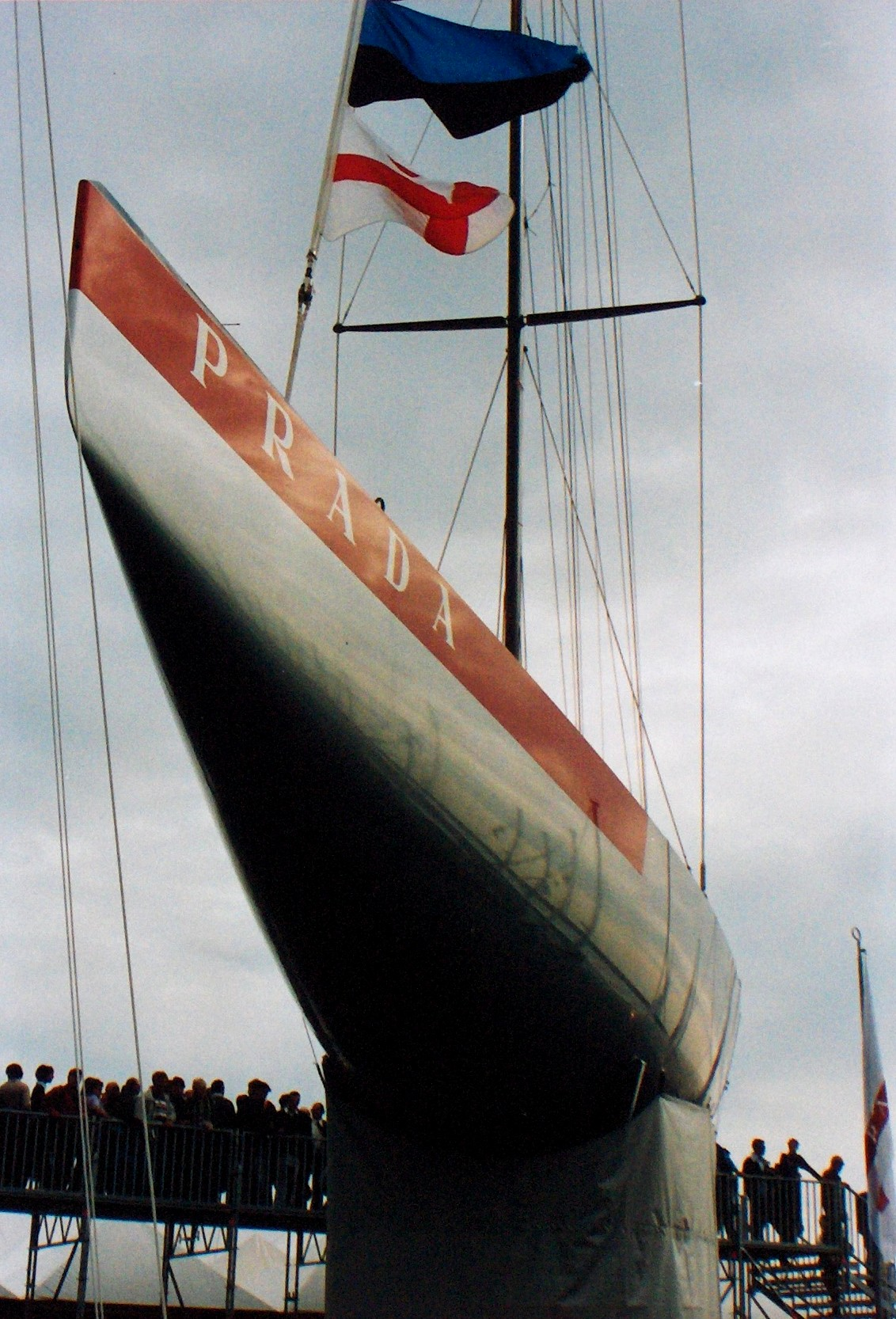
IACC ITA-45 on exhibit at the Genoa International Boat Show in October 2000

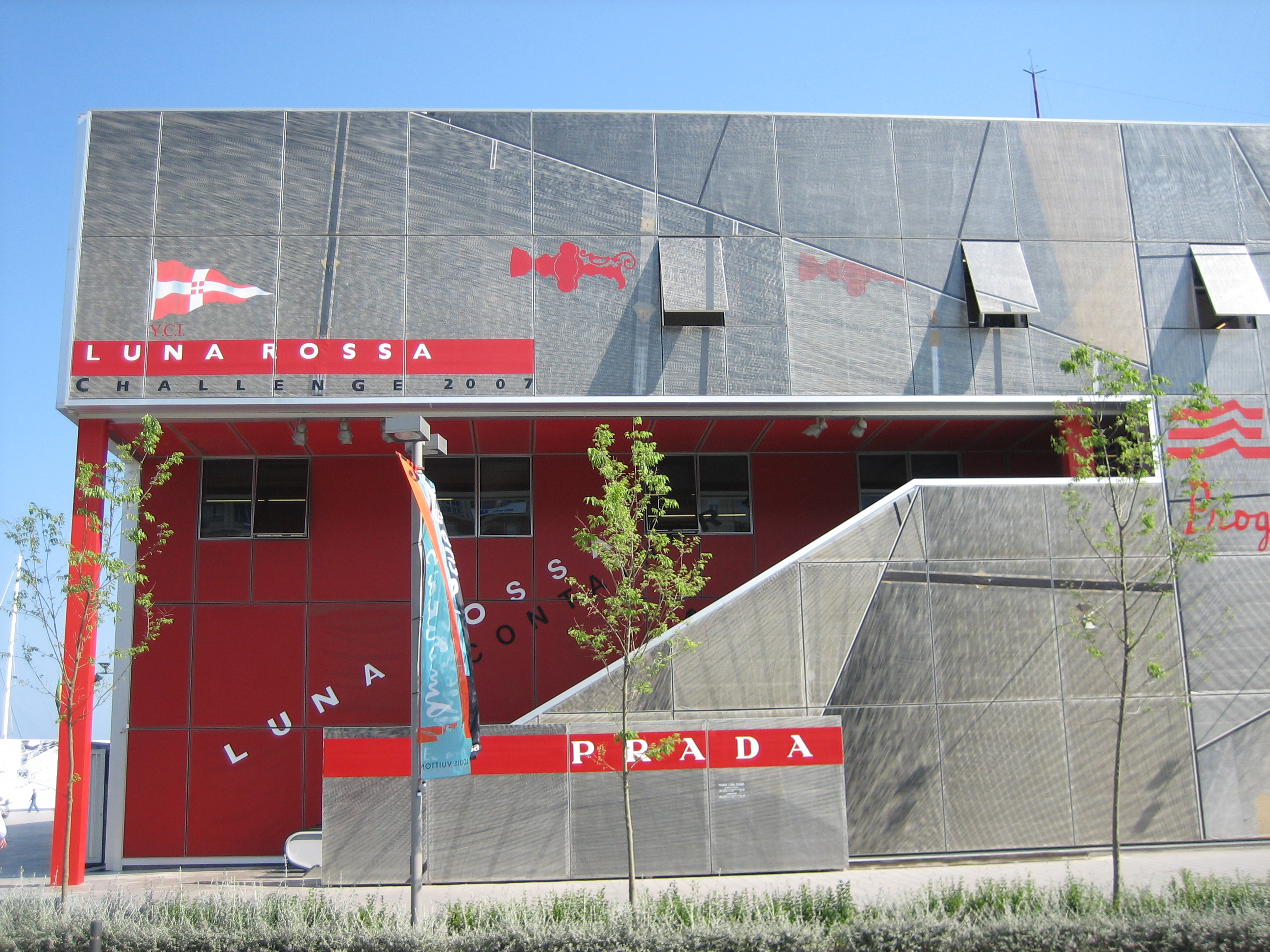
Luna Rossa's base in Valencia designed by architect Renzo Piano, in April 2007

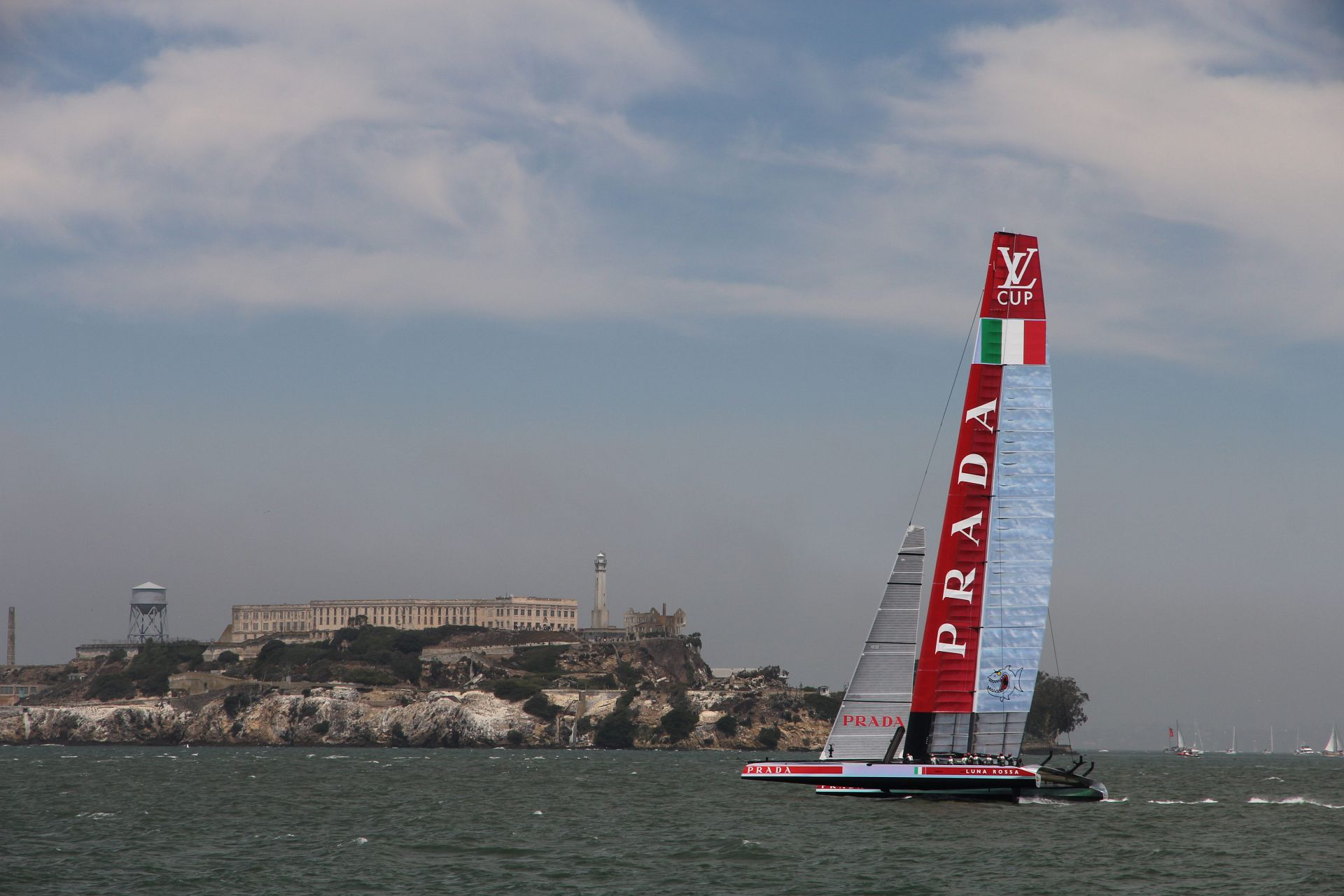
AC72 Luna Rossa sailing in San Francisco Bay during 2013 Louis Vuitton Cup

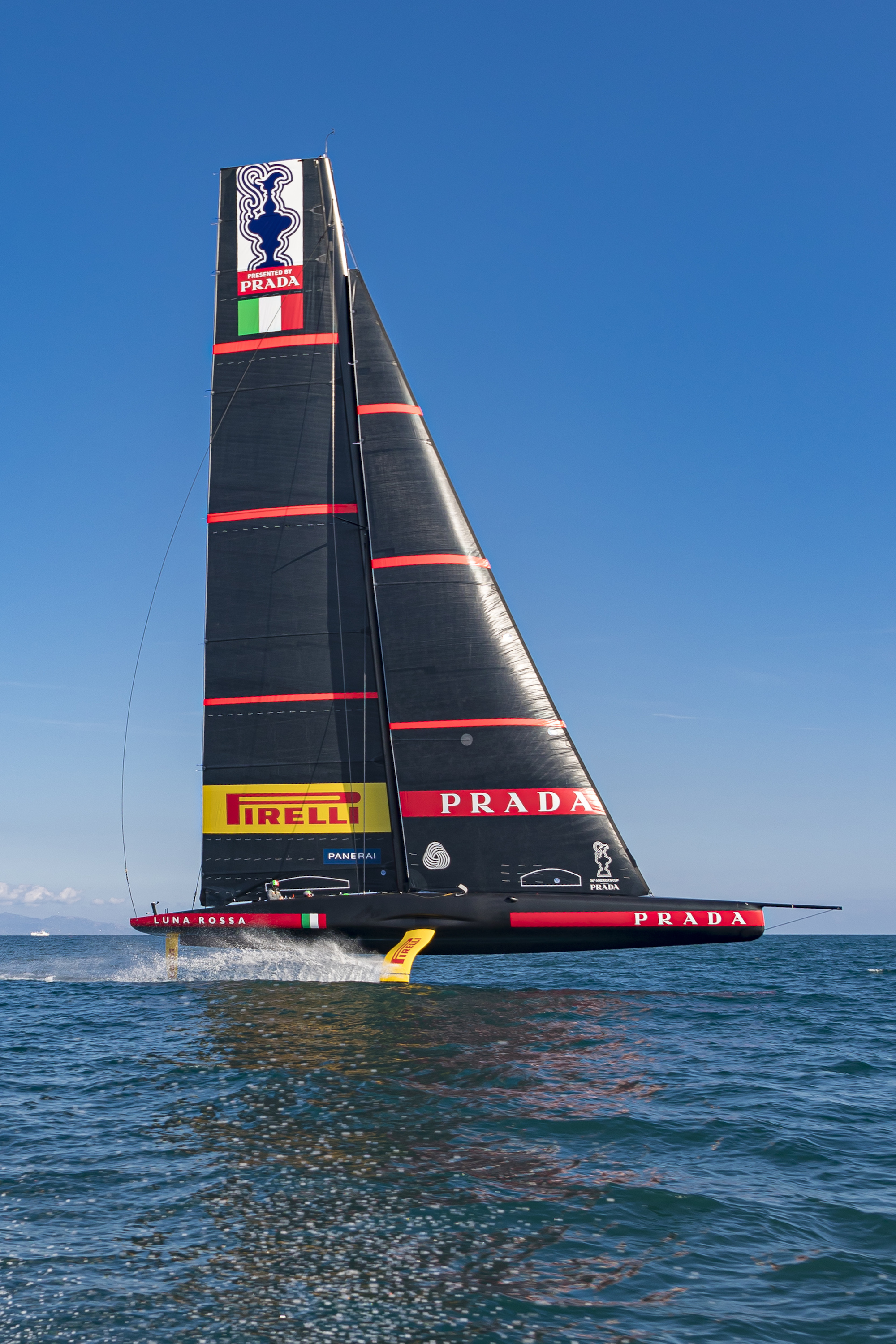
Luna Rossa's first AC75 training in Cagliari in October 2019

=== 1997–2000: The first challenge ===
In February 1997, Prada CEO and avid sailor Patrizio Bertelli met with Argentinian yacht designer German Frers to discuss the construction of a cruising yacht. Frers asked suddenly "Why don’t we consider the America’s Cup?". Within 15 days, the core group behind Luna Rossa's first America's Cup campaign was established; the team challenged for the 30th America's Cup on behalf of the Yacht Club Punta Ala and under the name Prada Challenge.

Starting from October 1999 in Auckland, New Zealand, the team raced in the 2000 Louis Vuitton Cup with its two IACC yachts ITA-45 and ITA-48 (the latter only for the first two Round Robins) skippered by Francesco de Angelis. After ranking first in the Round Robin stage by winning 26 out of 29 races, and first again in the knockout stage after winning 8 out of 10, Luna Rossa disputed the finals against AmericaOne, skippered by Paul Cayard. In a long battle across 9 races, Luna Rossa ultimately prevailed 5–4, winning the Louis Vuitton Cup on 6 February 2000, the second time ever for an Italian team after Il Moro di Venezia in 1992.

Having earned the right to challenge for the 2000 America's Cup, Luna Rossa lost 5–0 to defending Cup champion Team New Zealand.

=== 2001–2003: The second challenge ===
Luna Rossa was the first to issue a challenge to Team New Zealand for the 31st America's Cup and therefore contested the 2003 Louis Vuitton Cup as the Challenger of Record. The team built two new IACC yachts, ITA-74 and ITA-80, which did not perform as expected. Still skippered by Francesco de Angelis, Luna Rossa was eliminated in the semi-final stage by American team OneWorld.

=== 2004–2007: The third challenge ===
After Alinghi's victory in the 2003 America's Cup, the competition moved to Valencia, Spain, for the first time in Europe. Luna Rossa was the first of the 12 participating teams to set up a base in Valencia, with a restructured team compared to the previous two campaigns. Now competing as Luna Rossa Challenge with Telecom Italia as an additional sponsor, the team challenged on behalf of the Yacht Club Italiano, based in Genoa, one of the oldest yacht club in the Mediterranean. The sailing team was enriched with new members, most notably Jimmy Spithill as helmsman, while Francesco de Angelis remained skipper.

The team built two new IACC yachts for the campaign, ITA-86 and ITA-94, the latter of which raced in the 2007 Louis Vuitton Cup. After ranking third in the Round Robin stage, winning 16 out of 20 races, the team beat BMW Oracle Racing 5–1 in the semi-finals. Luna Rossa then lost 5–0 in the Louis Vuitton Cup finals against Emirates Team New Zealand.

=== 2007–2011: The Cup on a hiatus ===
With the extensive court challenges leading to the 2010 America's Cup, there was no Louis Vuitton Cup competition planned for several years. During this period, Luna Rossa Challenge joined other teams racing IACC yachts in the 2009 Louis Vuitton Pacific Series and in the 2010 Louis Vuitton Trophy, La Maddalena event.

Furthermore, the team remained active racing in the Maxi yacht circuit in 2008 and 2009 with an STP 65' yacht, skippered by Robert Scheidt, and raced in the Audi MedCup in 2010 with a TP52 yacht.

In 2011, Luna Rossa joined the Extreme Sailing Series, racing for the first time in catamarans. During this series, Luna Rossa was skippered for the first time by Max Sirena, who had been mid-bowman in Luna Rossa's previous three America's Cup campaigns and had a key role as wing mast manager for BMW Oracle Racing's trimaran USA-17 that won the 2010 America's Cup. Luna Rossa won the 2011 Extreme Sailing Series at its first and only participation in the circuit.

=== 2011–2013: The fourth challenge ===
In October 2011, Luna Rossa challenged for the 34th America's Cup on behalf of the Circolo della Vela Sicilia, based in Palermo. Luna Rossa Challenge was last to enter the event, which was to be contested with a new class of yachts, the AC72 catamarans.

The team bought two AC45 catamarans to get the team up to speed with multihulls and compete in the newly developed America's Cup World Series. The two boats, called Piranha and Swordfish, raced for the first time at the event in Naples between 11 and 15 April 2012 and were helmed by British sailors Chris Draper and Paul Campbell-James but with a primarily Italian crew, including skipper Max Sirena and Francesco Bruni as wing trimmer. 'Luna Rossa Piranha' went on to win the overall 2012/2013 season of the America's Cup World Series, following the disqualification of Oracle Team USA.

To overcome the late start in the 2013 America's Cup campaign, a deal was signed with Emirates Team New Zealand to share information on the design of their AC72 catamarans. Luna Rossa constructed only one AC72, which was launched in Auckland in October 2012. Luna Rossa's catamaran was characterised by a unique chrome livery.

Luna Rossa ranked second in the Round Robin stage of the 2013 Louis Vuitton Cup, with 4 losses against Emirates Team New Zealand and 4 forfeit wins against Artemis Racing, who did not participate in the first stage of the competition after a disastrous capsize. Then, Luna Rossa contested the semi-finals against the Swedish team, easily winning 4–0.

Luna Rossa and Emirates Team New Zealand ended up facing each other in the challengers’ final, which the kiwi team won 7–1.

=== 2013–2017: A challenge withdrawn ===
In June 2014, Luna Rossa confirmed they would compete for the 2017 Louis Vuitton Cup, which was to be contested in AC62 catamarans. The team set up a new base in Cagliari and started development on the new boat.

In April 2015, before the preliminary 2015–16 America's Cup World Series started competition, it was decided that the 2017 America's Cup would switch to a smaller class of yacht, the AC50 catamaran, without the unanimous consent of all competitors. Luna Rossa Challenge, which was already in an advanced design stage for a yacht according to the original rule, withdrew in protest.

Following Luna Rossa's withdrawal, the team lent resources and key personnel to Emirates Team New Zealand in their effort to win the Cup against current defender Oracle Team USA. Most notably, Luna Rossa skipper and team director Max Sirena joined the kiwi team in a management role. As soon as Emirates Team New Zealand won the 35th America's Cup on 26 June 2017, Luna Rossa challenged the kiwi team on behalf of the Circolo della Vela Sicilia and became the Challenger of Record for the 36th America's Cup.

=== 2017–2021: Return to New Zealand ===
Now branded as Luna Rossa Prada Pirelli following the addition of sponsor Pirelli, the team organised and participated in the 2021 Prada Cup, due to its position as Challenger of Record. The competition returned to monohulls with the establishment of a new class of foiling yachts, the AC75. Luna Rossa's operations initially took place in their base in Cagliari, Sardinia, where the team's first AC75 yacht was launched in October 2019, and moved to Auckland in September 2020, where they launched a second AC75 in October 2020.

The Italian sailboat raced in the 2021 Prada Cup with a unique dual helmsmen configuration, with Jimmy Spithill on starboard and Francesco Bruni on port, while skipper Max Sirena stayed off the boat. Luna Rossa ranked second in the Round Robin phase and then beat American Magic 4–0 in the semi-finals. In the 2021 Prada Cup final the team won 7–1 against Ineos Team UK, earning the right to challenge for the 2021 America's Cup. Horacio Carabelli was the design coordinator.

Facing defender Emirates Team New Zealand, Luna Rossa managed to win one point on each of the first three days of the competition, after which the two teams were tied 3-3. Nevertheless, the defender eventually prevailed and won the 2021 America's Cup with a score of 7–3.

=== 2021–2024: Barcelona ===
Luna Rossa challenged for the 2024 America's Cup, to be held in Barcelona. The team kept operating from their existing base in Cagliari, where they launched their new AC75 yacht in April 2024.

During the 2024 Louis Vuitton Cup, Luna Rossa's yacht was once again helmed by Jimmy Spithill on starboard and Francesco Bruni on port. The team qualified in second place during the round robin phase, and then defeated American Magic 5-3 in the semi-finals. In a repeat of the previous edition, they faced INEOS Britannia in the Louis Vuitton Cup final, yet this time lost 7-4 to the British challenger, failing to qualify for the America's Cup. Luna Rossa notably suffered some technical failures throughout the series, including a broken mainsail in race 3 of the LVC final and a mechanical failure during race 7.

Nevertheless, the team managed to perform well in the side competitions raced in the new, smaller, AC40 class, winning the Youth America's Cup as well as the inaugural Women's America's Cup. The youth team was helmed by Marco Gradoni and Gianlugi Ugolini, while the women's team saw Giulia Conti and Maria Vittoria Marchesini at the helm.

=== 2025–2027: Naples ===
Since 2025, Luna Rossa is preparing for the 2027 America's Cup at their base in Cagliari.

Luna Rossa's challenge for the next edition was issued on behalf of the Circolo della Vela e del Remo Italia, marking a partnership with a new yacht club after racing under the Circolo della Vela Sicilia burgee since 2013. This historic club, founded in 1889, is based in Naples, where the next edition of the event is due to take place.

The team notably saw the addition of Emirates Team New Zealand three-time winning skipper Peter Burling as well as another former ETNZ sailor, Josh Junior

== Results ==
Year	Venue	Boat	Yachting club	Skipper	Competition	Result	Winner	Notes
2000	(New Zealand) Auckland	Luna Rossa (IACC ITA-45)	Yacht Club Punta Ala	Francesco de Angelis	Louis Vuitton Cup	Winner		
2000	(New Zealand) Auckland	Luna Rossa (IACC ITA-45)	Yacht Club Punta Ala	Francesco de Angelis	America's Cup	Loser	Team New Zealand	
2003	(New Zealand) Auckland	Luna Rossa (IACC ITA-74)	Yacht Club Punta Ala	Francesco de Angelis	Louis Vuitton Cup	Semifinalist	(Switzerland) Alinghi	
2007	(Spain) Valencia	Luna Rossa (IACC ITA-94)	Yacht Club Italiano	Francesco de Angelis	Louis Vuitton Cup	Finalist	Emirates Team New Zealand	
2013	(United States) San Francisco	Luna Rossa (AC72)	Circolo della Vela Sicilia	Max Sirena	Louis Vuitton Cup	Finalist	Emirates Team New Zealand	
2021	(New Zealand) Auckland	Luna Rossa (AC75)	Circolo della Vela Sicilia	Max Sirena	Prada Cup	Winner		
2021	(New Zealand) Auckland	Luna Rossa (AC75)	Circolo della Vela Sicilia	Max Sirena	America's Cup	Loser	Emirates Team New Zealand	
2024	(Spain) Barcelona	Luna Rossa (AC75 v2.0)	Circolo della Vela Sicilia	Max Sirena	Louis Vuitton Cup	Finalist	(United Kingdom) INEOS Britannia	

== The boats ==
A total of 10 boats have been built for America's Cup campaigns, all named Luna Rossa. Of these, two won the Challenger selection series and went on to officially challenge for the America's Cup (in 2000 and in 2021), both times losing to the defender Team New Zealand. Two more reached the challenger selection series final (in 2007 and 2013), losing again to Team New Zealand on both occasions.

Since the 2007 America's Cup, all Luna Rossa boats have been built by Persico Marine in Nembro, Italy.

Yachts built for America's Cup campaigns
Class	Sail No.	Shipyard	Launched	Name	Competitive history	Subsequent history	Notes
IACC	ITA-45	Prada Challenge – Green Marine	Punta Ala, 5 May 1999	Luna Rossa	Winner of the 2000 Louis Vuitton Cup; Lost the 2000 America's Cup to Team New Zealand (5-0)		
IACC	ITA-48	Prada Challenge – Green Marine	Punta Ala, 5 June 1999	Luna Rossa	Raced in Round Robins 1 & 2 at the 2000 Louis Vuitton Cup	Sold to Team Shosholoza which raced it as RSA-48	
IACC	ITA-74	Prada Boatyards	Punta Ala, 20 May 2002	Luna Rossa	Eliminated in the 2003 Louis Vuitton Cup semi-finals		
IACC	ITA-80	Prada Boatyards	Punta Ala, 30 August 2002	Luna Rossa	Trial boat (never raced)		
IACC	ITA-86	Persico Marine	Valencia, 22 March 2006	Luna Rossa	Raced in the 2006 Louis Vuitton ACC Championship		
IACC	ITA-94	Persico Marine	Valencia, 18 January 2007	Luna Rossa	Lost the 2007 Louis Vuitton Cup final to Emirates Team New Zealand (5-0)		
AC72		Persico Marine	Auckland, 26 October 2012	Luna Rossa	Lost the 2013 Louis Vuitton Cup final to Emirates Team New Zealand (7-1)	Currently on display at the Museo Nazionale Scienza e Tecnologia Leonardo da Vinci	
AC75		Persico Marine	Cagliari, 2 October 2019	Luna Rossa	Trial boat (never raced)		
AC75		Persico Marine	Auckland, 20 October 2020	Luna Rossa	Winner of the 2021 Prada Cup; Lost the 2021 America's Cup to Emirates Team New Zealand (7-3)		
AC75 v2.0		Persico Marine	Cagliari, 13 April 2024	Luna Rossa	Lost the 2024 Louis Vuitton Cup final to INEOS Britannia (7-4)		

== Notable sailors ==
- Francesco de Angelis – Skipper (2000, 2003, 2007)
- Max Sirena – Mid-bowman (2000, 2003, 2007), Skipper (2013, 2021, 2024)
- Francesco Bruni – Afterguard (2003, 2007), Tactician (2013), Helmsman (2021, 2024)
- James Spithill – Helmsman (2007, 2021, 2024)
- Chris Draper – Helmsman (2013)
- Torben Grael – Tactician (2000, 2003, 2007)
- Gilberto Nobili – Grinder (2003, 2007), Operations Manager (2021, 2024)
- Matteo Plazzi – Navigator (2000, 2003, 2007)
- Pietro Sibello – Wing trimmer (2021)
- Philippe Presti – Coach (2007, 2021, 2024)

== See also ==
- Italy at the America's Cup
