= Gilberto Nobili =

Italian sailor

Gilberto Nobili is an Italian sailor and engineer who has sailed in multiple America's Cups.

Born in Castelnovo ne' Monti, Nobili sailed with Prada Challenge in the 2003 Louis Vuitton Cup. He competed with Francesco Bruni in the 2006 Star World Championships before sailing with Luna Rossa Challenge in the 2007 Louis Vuitton Cup.

He joined Oracle Racing in 2008, as a sailor and system performance specialist, winning the 2010 America's Cup and the 2013 America's Cup with Oracle Team USA in One of the Greatest Comebacks in Sports History

He originally re-joined Luna Rossa for the 2017 America's Cup campaign in 2014, but the Italian Team withdrew from the competition, and Nobili joined Team New Zealand winning the 35th America's Cup.

Since 2017, he has been Operations Manager and coordinator of Luna Rossa Prada Pirelli's Mechatronics department, sailing in the 2021 America's Cup on the Italian and boat winning the Prada Cup.
