= Matteo Plazzi =

Italian sailor

Matteo Plazzi (born in Ravenna) is an Italian sailor who has competed in multiple America's Cups.

Plazzi's first foray into the America's Cup was with Azzurra in the 1987 Louis Vuitton Cup. In addition to competing in the America's Cup, Matteo Plazzi has also raced around the world as a crew member onboard Winston in the 1993–94 Whitbread Round the World Race.

Plazzi was part of the Luna Rossa Challenge team that won the 2000 Louis Vuitton Cup, the Challenger Selection Series which took place in Auckland in advance of the 2000 America's Cup. Matteo Plazzi remained stayed with Luna Rossa Challenge for the 2003 and 2007 Louis Vuitton Cup America's Cup campaigns before joining Oracle Racing and as navigator on USA 17 when it won the 2010 America's Cup. Plazzi returned to Luna Rossa Challenge for the 2013 America's Cup.

Matteo Plazzi is the Technical Director of the Prada Cup, the Challenger Selection Series which will take place in 2021, the precursor to the 36th America's Cup in Auckland.
