= Francesco de Angelis (sailor) =

Italian yachtsman

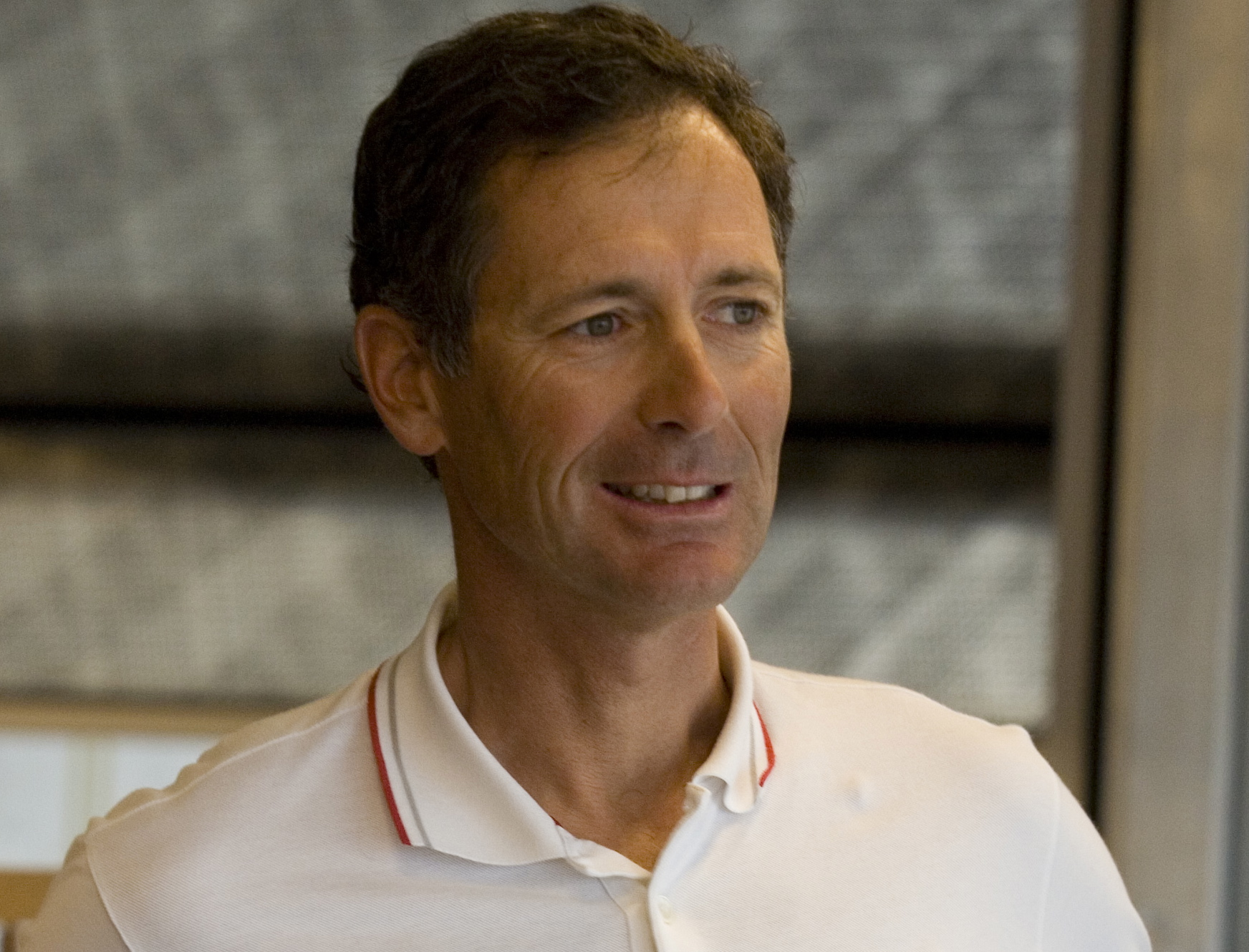
- de Angelis in 2007

Personal information
- Nickname: Barone
- Born: September 11, 1960 (age 65) Naples, Italy

Sport
- Country: Italy
- Sport: Sailing
- Event: Sailing yacht
- Club: Circolo del Remo
Medal record
Event	1st	2nd	3rd
World Championships	6	3	1

Francesco de Angelis ONZM (born 11 September 1960) is an Italian yachtsman. He was the first and so far only non-angloamerican skipper to win the Louis Vuitton Cup in Auckland in 2000 with Luna Rossa (ITA45).

== Biography ==
Francesco was born in Naples on September 11, 1960. Over the course of his career, he has won several prestigious regattas, including six world championships with different classes, one Admiral's Cup (1995), three Sardinia Cups, two Swan Cups, three Middle Sea Race Trophy (2005, 2013 and 2015), the Giraglia Trophy in 2018, the Aegean 600 (2021). He has won two European championships and nine Italian championships with different classes.

In 2000, as the skipper and helmsman of Luna Rossa, he won the Louis Vuitton Cup and challenged Team New Zealand's Black Magic (NZL60) in the XXX America's Cup. In the XXXI America's Cup in 2003, still as Luna Rossa's skipper and helmsman, he reached the semi-finals but lost to One World. In the XXXII America's Cup in 2007, he served as team director and skipper for Luna Rossa and reached, again, the Louis Vuitton final after beating BMW Oracle Racing 5–1. During the XXXIII America's Cup, he was a commentator for Italian broadcaster La7, worked as a guest expert for Sky during the 2012 London Olympics and Rai for the XXXVI America's Cup, Auckland 2021. For his distinction in sports, Francesco has been awarded four gold medals from the Italian National Olympic Committee. He was also named as an honorary Officer of the New Zealand Order of Merit, for services to yachting and New Zealand–Italy relations, in the 2000 Queen's Birthday Honours.

== Achievements ==
Year	Competition	Venue	Position	Class (Yacht)	Role	Notes
1987	World Championships	(Italy) Capri	1st	J/24	Helmsman	
1995	Admiral's Cup	(United Kingdom) Cowes	1st	Yacht racing (Brava Q8)	Helmsman	
2000	Louis Vuitton Cup	(New Zealand) Auckland	1st	Yacht racing (Luna Rossa)	Skipper and helmsman	
2000	America's Cup	(New Zealand) Auckland	2nd	Yacht racing (Luna Rossa)	Skipper and helmsman	
2008	World Championships	(Greece) Athens	1st	ORCi (Libertine)	Tactician	

Other results

- One Ton Cup Gold (1989, 1992)

Italian Championships

- J/24 Gold (1984, 1985, 1987)
- Star Gold (1985)

== Honours and awards ==
- Medaglie d'Oro al valore sportivo dal CONI (4 times)
- Honorary Officer of the New Zealand Order of Merit

== See also ==
- Italy at the America's Cup
