= 2024 Louis Vuitton Cup =

Sailing competition held to determine the challenger in the 2024 America's Cup

10th Louis Vuitton Cup
Event information
- Type: challenge race for 2024 America's Cup
- Dates: August 29 to October 5, 2024
- Host city: Barcelona, Spain
- Boats: NYYC American Magic (United States); INEOS Britannia (United Kingdom); Luna Rossa Prada Pirelli Team (Italy); Alinghi Red Bull Racing (Switzerland); Orient Express Racing Team (France); Emirates Team New Zealand
- Website: www.americascup.com

Succession
- Previous: 2021 Prada Cup
- Next: 2027 Louis Vuitton Cup

The 2024 Louis Vuitton Cup is a sailing competition held to determine the official challenger in the 2024 America's Cup yachting competition to challenge the defender Emirates Team New Zealand. The races were held from August 29 to October 7, 2024, in Barcelona, Spain.

== Teams ==
Five teams competed for the title of challenger against defender Emirates Team New Zealand in the 2024 America's Cup. Emirates Team New Zealand took part in Round Robin races but was not part of the final Round Robin Classification.

Team	Yacht Club	Skipper	Helmsmen	Completion
(United Kingdom) INEOS Britannia	Royal Yacht Squadron	(United Kingdom) Ben Ainslie	(United Kingdom) Ben Ainslie (United Kingdom) Dylan Fletcher	Winner. Qualified as challenger for the 37th America's Cup
Emirates Team New Zealand	Royal New Zealand Yacht Squadron	(New Zealand) Peter Burling	(New Zealand) Peter Burling (Australia) Nathan Outteridge	Automatically qualified as defender to 37th America's Cup
(Italy) Luna Rossa Prada Pirelli Team	Circolo della Vela Sicilia	(Italy) Max Sirena	(Australia) James Spithill (Italy) Francesco Bruni	Eliminated in final by INEOS Britannia
(United States) NYYC American Magic	New York Yacht Club	(United States) Terry Hutchinson	(Australia) Tom Slingsby (United Kingdom) Paul Goodison (Argentina) Lucas Calabrese	Eliminated in Semi-Final Group 1 by Luna Rossa Prada Pirelli Team
(Switzerland) Alinghi Red Bull Racing	Société Nautique de Genève	(Switzerland) Arnaud Psarofaghis	(Switzerland) Arnaud Psarofaghis (Switzerland) Maxime Bachelin	Eliminated in Semi-Final Group 2 by INEOS Britannia
(France) Orient Express Racing Team	Société Nautique de Saint-Tropez	(France) Quentin Delapierre	(France) Quentin Delapierre (France) Kevin Peponnet	Eliminated after Louis Vuitton Cup Double Round Robin

== Double Round Robin ==
=== Standings ===
The qualification for the Semi-Final of the top four Challengers is based on their race results between each other. The team winning the round robins classification (excluding results with the defender) will be able to choose its opponent in the Semi-Final.

As the Defender, Emirates Team New Zealand will automatically progress to the Final Match after Round Robin 2. In case of a tie in points for the first or last position in the round robins, a tie-breaker race will be held to determine the final ranking.

Pos	Team	Louis Vuitton Cup^{†}			All Races			Qualification
Pos	Team	Wins	Losses	Races	Wins	Losses	Races	Qualification
1	(United Kingdom) INEOS Britannia	6	2	8	7	3	10	Advanced to knock-out stage, chose semi-final opponent
2	(Italy) Luna Rossa Prada Pirelli Team	6	2	8	7	3	10	Advanced to Knock-out stage
3	(United States) NYYC American Magic	4	4	8	4	6	10	Advanced to Knock-out stage
4	(Switzerland) Alinghi Red Bull Racing	3	5	8	3	7	10	Advanced to Knock-out stage
5	(France) Orient Express Racing Team	1	7	8	1	9	10	Eliminated
NC	Emirates Team New Zealand	_			8	2	10	Qualified directly to 37th America's Cup
Citation:

^{†} All five challenger teams race New Zealand twice during the double round robin phase, but these are dead rubbers as points are not scored.

=== Round Robin 1 ===
Races held from August 29 to September 1:

Race	Date	Time	Port Entry	Starboard Entry	Time	Course	Legs	Start	Gate 1	Gate 2	Gate 3	Gate 4	Gate 5	Finish
1	August 29	24' 55"	(France) Orient Express Racing Team	(Switzerland) Alinghi Red Bull Racing	+0' 24"	C	6	(France) -0' 01"	(France) -0' 27"	(France) -0' 13"	(France) -0' 46"	(France) -0' 33"	(France) -0' 48"	(France) -0' 24"
2^{†}	August 29	+0' 12"	(Italy) Luna Rossa Prada Pirelli Team	Emirates Team New Zealand	21' 07"	C	6	(Italy) -0' 01"	(Italy) -0' 11"	(Italy) -0' 05"	(New Zealand) -0' 06"	(New Zealand) -0' 22"	(New Zealand) -0' 21"	(New Zealand) -0' 12"
3	August 29	24' 16"	(United Kingdom) INEOS Britannia	(United States) NYYC American Magic	+0' 14"	C	6	(United Kingdom) -1' 10"	(United Kingdom) -1' 06"	(United Kingdom) -1' 02"	(United Kingdom) -0' 59"	(United Kingdom) -0' 39"	(United Kingdom) -0' 41"	(United Kingdom) -0' 14"
4	August 29	+1' 24"	(France) Orient Express Racing Team	(Italy) Luna Rossa Prada Pirelli Team	23' 20"	C	6	(France) -0' 01"	(Italy) -0' 27"	(Italy) -0' 34"	(Italy) -0' 26"	(Italy) -0' 56"	(Italy) -0' 51"	(Italy) -1' 24"
5	August 30	31' 54"	(United States) NYYC American Magic	(Switzerland) Alinghi Red Bull Racing	+2' 58"	C	4	(United States) -1' 08"	(United States) -1' 27"	(United States) -1' 38"	(United States) -15' 27"	~	~	(United States) -2' 58"
6^{†}	August 30	DNS	Emirates Team New Zealand	(United Kingdom) INEOS Britannia		C	6	~	~	~	~	~	~	(United Kingdom) Awarded
7	August 31	22' 17"	(Italy) Luna Rossa Prada Pirelli Team	(United States) NYYC American Magic	+0' 24"	C	6	(United States) -0' 01"	(United States) -0' 02"	(United States) -0' 03"	(Italy) -0' 20"	(Italy) -0' 20"	(Italy) -0' 25"	(Italy) -0' 24"
8^{†}	August 31		Emirates Team New Zealand	(France) Orient Express Racing Team	DNS	C	6	~	~	~	~	~	~	(New Zealand) Awarded
9	August 31	+1' 25"	(Switzerland) Alinghi Red Bull Racing	(United Kingdom) INEOS Britannia	26' 05"	C	6	(United Kingdom) -0' 52"	(United Kingdom) -2' 12"	(United Kingdom) -1' 54"	(United Kingdom) -1' 54"	(United Kingdom) -2' 36"	(United Kingdom) -2' 26"	(United Kingdom) -1' 25"
10	August 31	DNF	(France) Orient Express Racing Team	(United States) NYYC American Magic		C	6	(United States) -0' 24"	(United States) -0' 41"	(United States) -0' 28"	(United States) -0' 13"	(United States) -0' 38"	(United States) ~	(United States) Awarded
11	August 31	+1' 24"	(United Kingdom) INEOS Britannia	(Italy) Luna Rossa Prada Pirelli Team	21' 28"	C	6	(United Kingdom) -0' 01"	(Italy) -0' 25"	(Italy) -2' 05"	(Italy) -2' 17"	(Italy) -1' 54"	(Italy) -1' 30"	(Italy) -1' 24"
12^{†}	September 1	DSQ	(Switzerland) Alinghi Red Bull Racing	Emirates Team New Zealand		C	6	(New Zealand) -0' 01"	(New Zealand) -0' 17"	(New Zealand) -0' 18"	(New Zealand) -0' 45"	(New Zealand) ~	(New Zealand) ~	(New Zealand) Awarded
13	September 1	22' 57"	(United Kingdom) INEOS Britannia	(France) Orient Express Racing Team	+0' 16"	C	6	(France) -0' 01"	(France) -0' 13"	(United Kingdom) -0' 03"	(France) -0' 20"	(France) -0' 12"	(United Kingdom) -0' 11"	(United Kingdom) -0' 16"
14	September 1	+0' 26"	(Switzerland) Alinghi Red Bull Racing	(Italy) Luna Rossa Prada Pirelli Team	22' 08"	C	6	(Switzerland) -0' 01"	(Italy) -0' 04"	(Italy) -0' 11"	(Italy) -0' 28"	(Italy) -0' 21"	(Italy) -0' 16"	(Italy) -0' 26"
15^{†}	September 1	+0' 29"	(United States) NYYC American Magic	Emirates Team New Zealand	24' 10"	C	6	(United States) -0' 01"	(United States) -0' 10"	(United States) -0' 09"	(United States) -0' 05"	(New Zealand) -0' 08"	(New Zealand) -0' 16"	(New Zealand) -0' 29"
Citation:

=== Round Robin 2 ===
Races held from September 3 to 8:

Race	Date	Time	Port Entry	Starboard Entry	Time	Course	Legs	Start	Gate 1	Gate 2	Gate 3	Gate 4	Gate 5	Finish
16	September 3	21' 42"	(Switzerland) Alinghi Red Bull Racing	(France) Orient Express Racing Team	+1' 10"	F	6	(Switzerland) -0' 05"	(Switzerland) -1' 38"	(Switzerland) -1' 36"	(Switzerland) -1' 15"	(Switzerland) -1' 12"	(Switzerland) -1' 05"	(Switzerland) -1' 10"
17^{†}	September 3	DSQ	Emirates Team New Zealand	(Italy) Luna Rossa Prada Pirelli Team		F	6	(Italy) -0' 00"	(Italy) -0' 16"	(Italy) -0' 17"	(Italy) -0' 23"	(Italy) -0' 31"	(Italy) -0' 59"	(Italy) Awarded
18	~~September 4~~; September 5	24' 07"	(United States) NYYC American Magic	(United Kingdom) INEOS Britannia	+0' 13"	A	6	(United States) -0' 02"	(United States) -0' 20"	(United States) -0' 29"	(United States) -0' 16"	(United States) -0' 09"	(United States) -0' 03"	(United States) -0' 13"
19	~~September 4~~; September 5	21' 57"	(Italy) Luna Rossa Prada Pirelli Team	(France) Orient Express Racing Team	+1' 02"	A	6	(Italy) -0' 05"	(Italy) -0' 10"	(Italy) -0' 27"	(Italy) -0' 37"	(Italy) -0' 40"	(Italy) -0' 37"	(Italy) -1' 02"
21^{†}	~~September 4~~; September 5	+3' 02"	(United Kingdom) INEOS Britannia	Emirates Team New Zealand	24' 20"	A	6	(United Kingdom) -0' 01"	(New Zealand) -0' 24"	(New Zealand) -0' 15"	(New Zealand) -0' 33"	(New Zealand) -0' 27"	(New Zealand) -2' 13"	(New Zealand) -3' 02"
20	~~September 4~~; September 5	21' 35"	(Switzerland) Alinghi Red Bull Racing	(United States) NYYC American Magic	+0' 38"	A	6	(Switzerland) -0' 01"	(Switzerland) -0' 10"	(Switzerland) -0' 14"	(Switzerland) -0' 23"	(Switzerland) -0' 42"	(Switzerland) -0' 42"	(Switzerland) -0' 38"
24^{†}	~~September 4~~; September 5	DNF	(France) Orient Express Racing Team	Emirates Team New Zealand	23' 43"	A	6	(New Zealand) -0' 14"	(France) -0' 21"	(France) -0' 14"	(New Zealand) -1' 53"	(New Zealand) ~	(New Zealand) ~	(New Zealand) Awarded
22	September 7	+0' 22"	(United States) NYYC American Magic	(Italy) Luna Rossa Prada Pirelli Team	23' 24"	A	6	(United States) -0' 01"	(Italy) -0' 14"	(Italy) -0' 03"	(Italy) -0' 07"	(Italy) -0' 19"	(Italy) -0' 26"	(Italy) -0' 22"
23	September 7	20' 39"	(United Kingdom) INEOS Britannia	(Switzerland) Alinghi Red Bull Racing	+ 0' 53"	A	6	(United Kingdom) -0' 01"	(United Kingdom) -0' 12"	(United Kingdom) -0' 21"	(United Kingdom) -0' 28"	(United Kingdom) -0' 39"	(United Kingdom) -0' 45"	(United Kingdom) -0' 53"
26	September 7	22' 23"	(United States) NYYC American Magic	(France) Orient Express Racing Team	+0' 15"	A	6	(United States) -0' 02"	(United States) -0' 08"	(United States) -0' 14"	(United States) -0' 15"	(United States) -0' 20"	(United States) -0' 18"	(United States) -0' 15"
27^{†}	September 7	21' 36"	Emirates Team New Zealand	(Switzerland) Alinghi Red Bull Racing	+0' 38"	A	6	(Switzerland) -0' 02"	(New Zealand) -0' 07"	(New Zealand) -0' 13"	(New Zealand) -0' 20"	(New Zealand) -0' 23"	(New Zealand) -0' 38"	(New Zealand) -0' 38"
25	September 7	+0' 25"	(Italy) Luna Rossa Prada Pirelli Team	(United Kingdom) INEOS Britannia	21' 43"	A	6	(United Kingdom) -0' 01"	(United Kingdom) -0' 08"	(United Kingdom) -0' 08"	(United Kingdom) -0' 22"	(United Kingdom) -0' 29"	(United Kingdom) -0' 30"	(United Kingdom) -0' 25"
28	~~September 8~~; September 9	+1' 11"	(France) Orient Express Racing Team	(United Kingdom) INEOS Britannia	23' 00"	B	6	(France) -0' 01"	(United Kingdom) -0' 25"	(United Kingdom) -0' 47"	(United Kingdom) -1' 24"	(United Kingdom) -1' 04"	(United Kingdom) -0' 55"	(United Kingdom) -1' 11"
29	~~September 8~~; September 9	DSQ	(Italy) Luna Rossa Prada Pirelli Team	(Switzerland) Alinghi Red Bull Racing		B	6	~	~	~	~	~	~	(Switzerland) Awarded
30^{†}	~~September 8~~; September 9	22' 25"	Emirates Team New Zealand	(United States) NYYC American Magic	+2' 37"	B	6	(New Zealand) -0' 02"	(New Zealand) -0' 07"	(New Zealand) -0' 31"	(New Zealand) -0' 22"	(New Zealand) -1' 21"	(New Zealand) -2' 22"	(New Zealand) -2' 37"
31 (Sail Off)	~~September 8~~; September 9	22' 12"	(United Kingdom) INEOS Britannia	(Italy) Luna Rossa Prada Pirelli Team	+0' 42"	B	6	(United Kingdom) -0' 01"	(United Kingdom) -0' 18"	(United Kingdom) -0' 29"	(United Kingdom) -0' 33"	(United Kingdom) -0' 49"	(United Kingdom) -0' 37"	(United Kingdom) -0' 42"
Citation:

== Knock-out stage ==
The knockout stage consists of two semi-finals run as a best-of-nine match race series, followed by the final run as a best-of-13 match race series.

Semi-finals
(Italy) Luna Rossa Prada Pirelli Team	5
(United States) NYYC American Magic	3
(United Kingdom) INEOS Britannia	5
(Switzerland) Alinghi Red Bull Racing	2

Final
(Italy) Luna Rossa Prada Pirelli Team	4
(United Kingdom) INEOS Britannia	7

=== Semi-Final Group 1 ===
Races won
	1	2	3	4	5	6	7	8	Total
(Italy) Luna Rossa Prada Pirelli Team	●	●	●	●				●	5
(United States) NYYC American Magic					●	●	●		3

Race	Date	Time	Port Entry	Starboard Entry	Time	Course	Legs	Start	Gate 1	Gate 2	Gate 3	Gate 4	Gate 5	Finish
1	September 14	22' 12"	(Italy) Luna Rossa Prada Pirelli Team	(United States) NYYC American Magic	+0' 07"	B	6	(United States): 00:06.7	(United States): 00:06.2	(United States): 00:20.1	(United States): 00:15.4	(United States): 00:02.6	(Italy): 00:21.4	(Italy): 00:06.8
2	September 14	+0' 18"	(United States) NYYC American Magic	(Italy) Luna Rossa Prada Pirelli Team	24' 26"	B	6	(United States): 00:00.5	(United States): 00:12.3	(United States): 00:07.9	(Italy): 00:19.5	(Italy): 00:15.1	(Italy): 00:13.5	(Italy): 00:17.8
3	September 15	+0' 26"	(United States) NYYC American Magic	(Italy) Luna Rossa Prada Pirelli Team	22' 29"	B	6	(United States): 00:00.4	(Italy): 00:12.0	(Italy): 00:15.3	(Italy): 00:31.9	(Italy): 00:23.3	(Italy): 00:33.5	(Italy): 00:25.4
4	September 15	22' 50"	(Italy) Luna Rossa Prada Pirelli Team	(United States) NYYC American Magic	+0' 02"	B	6	(United States): 00:00.6	(Italy): 00:06.2	(Italy): 00:10.5	(Italy): 00:12.2	(Italy): 00:09.2	(Italy): 00:03.9	(Italy): 00:02.7
5	September 16	DNF	(Italy) Luna Rossa Prada Pirelli Team	(United States) NYYC American Magic	26' 45"	B	6	(United States): 00:02.6	(Italy): 00:14.5	(Italy): 00:20.2	(United States): 00:03.6	(United States): 00:03.3	(United States) ~	(United States) ~
6	September 18	27' 18"	(United States) NYYC American Magic	(Italy) Luna Rossa Prada Pirelli Team	DSQ	C	4	(United States): 00:01.7	(Italy): 00:45.8	(Italy): 00:02.0	(United States): 02:32.5	~	~	(United States) ~
7	September 18	22' 02"	(United States) NYYC American Magic	(Italy) Luna Rossa Prada Pirelli Team	DNF	C	6	(Italy): 00:00.0	(United States): 00:03.7	(United States): 00:05.3	(Italy): 00:03.1	(United States) ~	(United States) ~	(United States) ~
8	September 19	22' 56"	(Italy) Luna Rossa Prada Pirelli Team	(United States) NYYC American Magic	+1' 01"	B	6	(United States): 00:00.9	(Italy): 00:18.6	(Italy): 00:21.2	(Italy): 00:07.4	(Italy): 00:23.1	(Italy): 00:52.5	(Italy): 00:61.0
Citation:

Notes: Gate time gaps may differ from live TV coverage as they are based on publicly available race telemetry data.

=== Semi-Final Group 2 ===
Races won
Team	1	2	3	4	5	6	7	Total
(United Kingdom) INEOS Britannia	●	●	●	●			●	5
(Switzerland) Alinghi Red Bull Racing					●	●		2

Race	Date	Time	Port Entry	Starboard Entry	Time	Course	Legs	Start	Gate 1	Gate 2	Gate 3	Gate 4	Gate 5	Finish
1	September 14	+2' 05"	(Switzerland) Alinghi Red Bull Racing	(United Kingdom) INEOS Britannia	23' 32"	B	6	(Switzerland): 00:04.5	(Switzerland): 00:10.9	(United Kingdom): 00:22.3	(United Kingdom): 00:45.0	(United Kingdom): 01:24.0	(United Kingdom): 01:20.5	(United Kingdom): 02:05.1
2	September 14	20' 33"	(United Kingdom) INEOS Britannia	(Switzerland) Alinghi Red Bull Racing	+1' 37"	B	6	(United Kingdom): 00:09.8	(United Kingdom): 01:14.1	(United Kingdom): 01:22.6	(United Kingdom): 01:16.4	(United Kingdom): 01:33.7	(United Kingdom): 01:36.2	(United Kingdom): 01:36.6
3	September 15	22' 31"	(United Kingdom) INEOS Britannia	(Switzerland) Alinghi Red Bull Racing	+2' 20"	B	6	(United Kingdom): 00:43.5	(United Kingdom): 01:19.3	(United Kingdom): 01:28.3	(United Kingdom): 01:39.5	(United Kingdom): 01:48.5	(United Kingdom): 02:02.3	(United Kingdom): 02:19.8
4	September 15	+0' 48"	(Switzerland) Alinghi Red Bull Racing	(United Kingdom) INEOS Britannia	22' 23"	B	6	(Switzerland): 00:00.2	(United Kingdom): 00:15.2	(United Kingdom): 00:23.0	(United Kingdom): 00:36.8	(United Kingdom): 00:39.2	(United Kingdom): 00:47.1	(United Kingdom): 00:48.3
5	September 16	41' 22"	(Switzerland) Alinghi Red Bull Racing	(United Kingdom) INEOS Britannia	DNF	B	5	(Switzerland): 00:01.1	(United Kingdom): 00:15.0	(United Kingdom): 01:11.3	(Switzerland): 08:39.6	(Switzerland) ~	~	(Switzerland) ~
6	September 18	+1' 23"	(United Kingdom) INEOS Britannia	(Switzerland) Alinghi Red Bull Racing	20' 22"	C	6	(Switzerland): 00:01.4	(United Kingdom): 00:03.1	(Switzerland): 01:02.6	(Switzerland): 01:01.5	(Switzerland): 01:23.2	(Switzerland): 00:42.5	(Switzerland): 01:22.9
7	September 18	23' 47"	(United Kingdom) INEOS Britannia	(Switzerland) Alinghi Red Bull Racing	+1' 08"	C	6	(Switzerland): 00:03.2	(United Kingdom): 00:21.8	(United Kingdom): 00:30.3	(United Kingdom): 00:51.0	(United Kingdom): 00:39.7	(United Kingdom): 01:10.0	(United Kingdom): 01:10.1
Citation:

Notes: Gate time gaps may differ from live TV coverage as they are based on publicly available race telemetry data.

=== Final ===
Races won
Team	1	2	3	4	5	6	7	8	9	10	11	Total
(United Kingdom) INEOS Britannia		●	●		●		●		●	●	●	7
(Italy) Luna Rossa Prada Pirelli Team	●			●		●		●				4

Race	Date	Time	Port Entry	Starboard Entry	Time	Course	Legs	Start	Gate 1	Gate 2	Gate 3	Gate 4	Gate 5	Gate 6	Gate 7	Finish
1	September 26	27' 03"	(Italy) Luna Rossa Prada Pirelli Team	(United Kingdom) INEOS Britannia	+0' 46"	A	8	(Italy): 00:03.1	(Italy): 00:10.6	(Italy): 00:12.5	(Italy): 00:25.2	(Italy): 00:19.3	(Italy): 00:33.6	(Italy): 00:28.5	(Italy): 00:42.0	(Italy): 00:46.7
2	September 26	27' 25"	(United Kingdom) INEOS Britannia	(Italy) Luna Rossa Prada Pirelli Team	+0' 18"	A	8	(United Kingdom): 00:00.7	(United Kingdom): 00:08.6	(United Kingdom): 00:17.5	(United Kingdom): 00:07.5	(United Kingdom): 00:12.3	(United Kingdom): 00:09.8	(United Kingdom): 00:16.0	(United Kingdom): 00:17.9	(United Kingdom): 00:18.5
3 abandoned	September 28		(United Kingdom) INEOS Britannia	(Italy) Luna Rossa Prada Pirelli Team		C	6	(United Kingdom): 00:00.1	(United Kingdom): 00:17.0	(United Kingdom): 00:15.8	(United Kingdom): 01:29.5	(United Kingdom): 01:09.1	(United Kingdom): 06:01.6	~	~	~
3	September 29		(United Kingdom) INEOS Britannia	(Italy) Luna Rossa Prada Pirelli Team	DSQ	A	8	~	~	~	~	~	~	~	~	(United Kingdom) Awarded
4	September 29	26' 38"	(Italy) Luna Rossa Prada Pirelli Team	(United Kingdom) INEOS Britannia	+0' 04"	A	8	(Italy): 00:00.3	(Italy): 00:04.2	(Italy): 00:05.4	(Italy): 00:04.1	(Italy): 00:06.6	(Italy): 00:19.3	(Italy): 00:21.1	(Italy): 00:04.5	(Italy): 00:04.6
5	September 30	+00' 12"	(Italy) Luna Rossa Prada Pirelli Team	(United Kingdom) INEOS Britannia	27' 06"	A	8	(United Kingdom): 00:06.1	(United Kingdom): 00:05.0	(United Kingdom): 00:04.3	(United Kingdom): 00:07.6	(United Kingdom): 00:10.3	(United Kingdom): 00:06.0	(United Kingdom): 00:10.3	(United Kingdom): 00:08.7	(United Kingdom): 00:12.1
6	September 30	+00' 17"	(United Kingdom) INEOS Britannia	(Italy) Luna Rossa Prada Pirelli Team	26' 56"	A	8	(Italy): 00:00.6	(Italy): 00:02.4	(Italy): 00:05.5	(Italy): 00:12.1	(Italy): 00:13.2	(Italy): 00:15.7	(Italy): 00:13.5	(Italy): 00:19.3	(Italy): 00:16.9
7	October 1		(United Kingdom) INEOS Britannia	(Italy) Luna Rossa Prada Pirelli Team	DSQ	A	8	(Italy): 00:00.2	(United Kingdom): 00:00.8	(United Kingdom) ~	(United Kingdom) ~	(United Kingdom) ~	~	~	~	(United Kingdom) Awarded
8	October 1	26' 32"	(Italy) Luna Rossa Prada Pirelli Team	(United Kingdom) INEOS Britannia	+00' 16"	A	8	(Italy): 00:04.8	(Italy): 00:12.2	(Italy): 00:07.3	(Italy): 00:05.8	(Italy): 00:06.0	(Italy): 00:08.1	(Italy): 00:11.6	(Italy): 00:16.7	(Italy): 00:15.6
9	October 2	+00' 23"	(Italy) Luna Rossa Prada Pirelli Team	(United Kingdom) INEOS Britannia	27' 35"	D	8	(United Kingdom): 00:00.6	(United Kingdom): 00:02.1	(United Kingdom): 00:11.4	(United Kingdom): 00:09.0	(United Kingdom): 00:06.9	(United Kingdom): 00:17.5	(United Kingdom): 00:16.2	(United Kingdom): 00:14.4	(United Kingdom): 00:22.9
10	October 2	27' 29"	(United Kingdom) INEOS Britannia	(Italy) Luna Rossa Prada Pirelli Team	+00' 08"	D	8	(United Kingdom): 00:00.7	(United Kingdom): 00:04.8	(United Kingdom): 00:11.3	(United Kingdom): 00:11.2	(United Kingdom): 00:09.3	(United Kingdom): 00:08.4	(United Kingdom): 00:12.8	(United Kingdom): 00:09.6	(United Kingdom): 00:08.4
11	October 4	26' 46"	(United Kingdom) INEOS Britannia	(Italy) Luna Rossa Prada Pirelli Team	+00' 17"	B	8	(United Kingdom): 00:00.3	(United Kingdom): 00:10.5	(United Kingdom): 00:11.2	(United Kingdom): 00:09.9	(United Kingdom): 00:07.5	(United Kingdom): 00:03.9	(United Kingdom): 00:08.9	(United Kingdom): 00:08.5	(United Kingdom): 00:17.5
Citation:

Notes:

- Race 3 on 28th of September was abandoned due to time limits after a sudden wind drop
- LRPP did not take part in Race 3 on 29th of September due to a broken mainsail
- LRPP suffered a mechanical failure during race 7 causing it to abandon the race
