= João Signorini =

Brazilian sailor

Joca Signorini
Personal information
- Full name: João (Joca) Signorini
- Born: 22 July 1977 (age 48) Rio de Janeiro, Brazil

Sport
- Sport: Sailing

Joca Signorini (born 22 July 1977) is a Brazilian sailor. He competed in the Finn event at the 2004 Summer Olympics.

He won the Volvo Ocean Race (Round the World Race) in 2008/09 on board Ericsson 4.
