= Yacht Club Punta Ala =

Sailing club in Italy

- Burgee
- Short name: YCPA
- Founded: 1976; 50 years ago
- Location: Punta Ala, Tuscany, Italy
- Website: www.ycpa.it

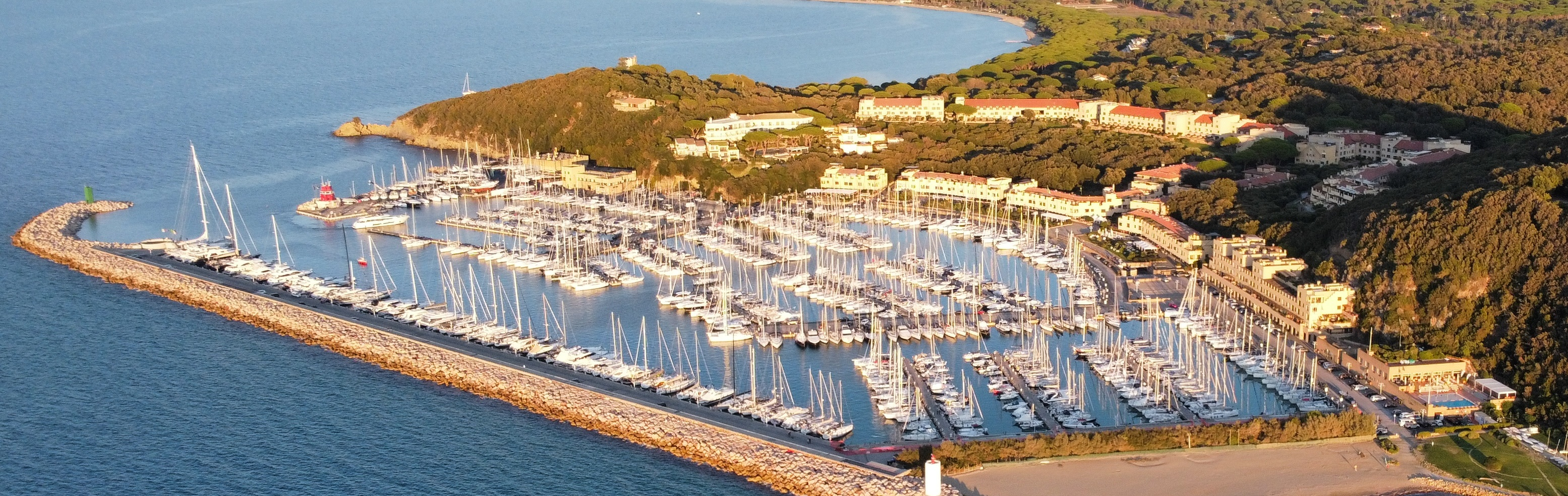

Yacht Club Punta Ala is a yacht club in Punta Ala, Tuscany, Italy.

On April 21, 1997, the club formally launched the challenge with the Luna Rossa boat, to the Royal New Zealand Yacht Squadron, holder of the America's Cup.

== See also ==
- Italy at the America's Cup
- Luna Rossa Challenge
