= 2021 Prada Cup =

Sailing competition held to determine the challenger in the 2021 America's Cup

1st Prada Cup
Event information
- Type: challenge race for 2021 America's Cup
- Dates: January 15 to February 21, 2021
- Host city: Auckland, New Zealand
- Boats: American Magic (United States); Ineos Team UK (United Kingdom); Luna Rossa Prada Pirelli (Italy)
- Website: www.americascup.com

Results
- Winner: Luna Rossa Prada Pirelli

Succession
- Previous: 2017 Louis Vuitton Challenger's Trophy
- Next: 2024 Louis Vuitton Cup

The 2021 Prada Cup was a sailing competition held to determine the challenger in the 2021 America's Cup who would challenge Emirates Team New Zealand. The races were held from January 15 to February 21, 2021 in Auckland, New Zealand and were preceded by the 2019–20 America's Cup World Series. Veteran sailor Iain Murray served again as race director. The team Luna Rossa Prada Pirelli beat Ineos Team UK 7-1 in the final moving onto the 2021 America's Cup.

== Teams ==
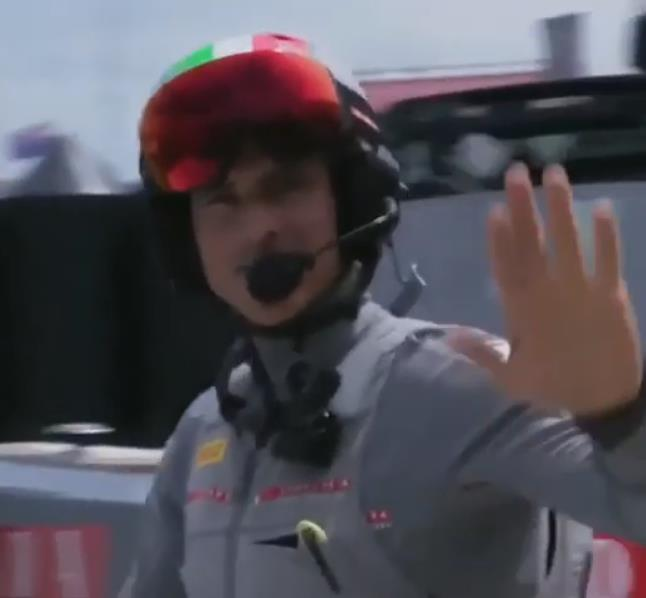
Francesco Bruni, the helmsman of Luna Rossa.

Three teams that competed for the title of challenger against defender Team New Zealand in the 2021 America's Cup.

Team	Yacht Club	Skipper	Helmsmen
(United States) NYYC American Magic	New York Yacht Club	(United States) Terry Hutchinson	(New Zealand) Dean Barker
(United Kingdom) Ineos Team UK	Royal Yacht Squadron	(United Kingdom) Ben Ainslie	(United Kingdom) Ben Ainslie
(Italy) Luna Rossa Prada Pirelli	Circolo della Vela Sicilia	(Italy) Max Sirena	(Australia) James Spithill (Italy) Francesco Bruni

== Rules ==
=== Boats ===
The Cup is sailed in AC75s, 75-foot foiling monohulls. The boats are expected to have requirements around the boats being "constructed in country". Teams are allowed to build two boats each.

=== Nationality ===
Twenty percent of sailors in each team must have passports from that country. The rest must meet a residency requirement: they must reside in that team's country for 380 days from 1 September 2018 to 1 September 2020.

=== Competition format ===
The Prada Cup uses a quadruple Round-robin tournament to determine a seeding. The second and third seeds after all twelve races then compete in a seven-race series to advance to a 13-race final series against the first seed from the round robin. The winner of this final series will become the challenger for the 2021 America's Cup against defender Team New Zealand.

== Round Robin ==
The triple round-robin series was held on the 15th till the 23rd of January. The UK was undefeated and therefore qualified directly for the final. America lost twice to each of the other competitors, and then in their fourth race the American team capsized and caused significant damage to the boat – forcing their withdrawal from the remaining races in the round-robin while they undertook repairs. Italy, having lost all their races against UK but won all the races against the US, came second. This forced the US and Italy to the semif-final knockout series, and the right to challenge the UK again in the final.

	Team	W	L
1	(United Kingdom) Ineos Team UK	6	0
2	(Italy) Luna Rossa Prada Pirelli	3	3
3	(United States) American Magic	0	6

=== Round Robin 1 (January 15–16) ===
Race	Date	Time	Port Entry	Starboard Entry	Time	Course	Legs	Start	Gate 1	Gate 2	Gate 3	Gate 4	Gate 5	Finish
1	January 15	+1' 20" (1,296 m)	(United States) American Magic	(United Kingdom) Ineos Team UK	23'13"	C	6	(United Kingdom) -0' 01"	(United Kingdom) -0' 11"	(United Kingdom) -0' 18"	(United Kingdom) -0' 22"	(United Kingdom) -0' 52"	(United Kingdom) -1' 08"	(United Kingdom) -1' 20"
2	January 15	24'44"	(United Kingdom) Ineos Team UK	(Italy) Luna Rossa Prada Pirelli	+0' 28" (431 m)	C	6	(United Kingdom) -0' 03"	(United Kingdom) -0' 14"	(United Kingdom) -0' 22"	(United Kingdom) -0' 23"	(United Kingdom) -0' 22"	(United Kingdom) -0' 13"	(United Kingdom) -0' 28"
3	January 16	38'54"	(Italy) Luna Rossa Prada Pirelli	(United States) American Magic	DNF (3,341 m)	C	4	(Italy) -0' 28"	(Italy) -7' 38"	(Italy) -1' 00"	(Italy) -6' 03"	~	~	(Italy); 5' 00"

Notes:

- Luna Rossa Prada Pirelli filed an official Claim of Non-Compliance (‘CNC’) against Ineos Team UK for use of a mainsail during Race 1 and Race 2 with an intentional opening in the skin to run an outhaul line through the opening, then covering up the hole with fabric so no air can pass through. The race committee inspected the mainsail and determined that the feature is an intentional opening through the sail skin that is not covered or closed while racing, but "determined that this non-compliance with the AC75 Class Rule has not (or could not reasonably be expected to have) improved the performance of the yacht or has not (or could not reasonably be expected to have) had a significant effect on the outcome of a race." Ineos Team UK was fined US$5,000, to be paid to the Sir Peter Blake Trust.
- Race 3 was shortened from six legs to four mid-race because of light winds.

=== Round Robin 2 (January 16–17) ===
Race	Date	Time	Port Entry	Starboard Entry	Time	Course	Legs	Start	Gate 1	Gate 2	Gate 3	Gate 4	Gate 5	Finish
1	January 16	42'44"	(United Kingdom) Ineos Team UK	(United States) American Magic	+4' 59" (2,865 m)	C	4	(United Kingdom) -0' 43"	(United Kingdom) -1' 49"	(United Kingdom) -8' 47"	(United Kingdom) -8' 40"	~	~	(United Kingdom) -4' 59"
2	January 17	+0' 18" (228 m)	(Italy) Luna Rossa Prada Pirelli	(United Kingdom) Ineos Team UK	27'35"	A	6	(United Kingdom) -0' 00"	(Italy) -0' 10"	(Italy) -0' 07"	(United Kingdom) -0' 00"	(United Kingdom) -0' 26"	(United Kingdom) -0' 12"	(United Kingdom) -0' 18"
3	January 17	DNF (Capsized)	(United States) American Magic	(Italy) Luna Rossa Prada Pirelli	22' 24"	A	6	(Italy) -0' 03"	(United States) -0' 06"	(United States) -0' 13"	(United States) -0' 27"	(United States) -0' 42"	(United States) -1' 02"	(Italy); Awarded

Notes:

- Race 2 was abandoned after 4 legs due to a wind shift causing the course to not have a defined upwind and downwind leg. The course was re-set and orientated more towards the west, with the race being re-run from the beginning.
- American Magic capsized while rounding Gate 5 when a gust of wind caught the sails causing the leeward running backstay to not release and preventing the mainsail from being eased. No crew were reported injured but the incident caused a large hole in the hull of the boat and for a time it was at significant risk of sinking. Per race rules, Luna Rossa Prada Pirelli was awarded the victory.

=== Round Robin 3 (January 22–23) ===
Race	Date	Time	Port Entry	Starboard Entry	Time	Course	Legs	Start	Gate 1	Gate 2	Gate 3	Gate 4	Gate 5	Finish
1	~~January 22~~; January 23	Awarded	(United Kingdom) Ineos Team UK	(United States) American Magic	DNS (Withdrawn)	C	6	~	~	~	~	~	~	~
2	~~January 22~~; January 23	+0' 33" (200 m)	(Italy) Luna Rossa Prada Pirelli	(United Kingdom) Ineos Team UK	24'33"	C	6	(Italy) -0' 00"	(United Kingdom) -0' 02"	(United Kingdom) -0' 09"	(Italy) -0' 19"	(Italy) -0' 10"	(United Kingdom) -0' 01"	(United Kingdom) -0' 33"
3	January 23	DNS (Withdrawn)	(United States) American Magic	(Italy) Luna Rossa Prada Pirelli	Awarded	C	6	~	~	~	~	~	~	~

Notes:

- American Magic announced they would not compete in Round robins 3 and 4 following the damage sustained to their boat Patriot during the capsize in their round robin 2 race. In accordance with the rules, "ghost races" would be held. Those which were to have featured the teams would still take part on time and, given the American team failed to reach the starting gate, the race would then be awarded to the competitor by default.
- Race 2 was set for January 22, but due to American Magic withdrawing from Round Robins 3 and 4, the race was moved to January 23.

=== Round Robin 4 (January 23–24) ===
Race	Date	Time	Port Entry	Starboard Entry	Time	Course	Legs	Start	Gate 1	Gate 2	Gate 3	Gate 4	Gate 5	Finish
1	~~January 23~~; ~~January 24~~; Cancelled	~	(United States) American Magic	(United Kingdom) Ineos Team UK	~	Cancelled								
2	~~January 24~~; Cancelled	~	(United Kingdom) Ineos Team UK	(Italy) Luna Rossa Prada Pirelli	~	Cancelled								
3	~~January 24~~; Cancelled	~	(Italy) Luna Rossa Prada Pirelli	(United States) American Magic	~	Cancelled								

Notes

- Since Ineos Team UK has already qualified for the finals, the final races were agreed to not be held after discussions between Ineos Team UK and Luna Rossa Prada Pirelli. No points are awarded for these races.

== Semi-final ==
The semi-finals were held from 29 January to 2 February 2021. The second and third-placed team from the round-robin competed in a best-of-seven series to determine who would sail in the final against the UK. As the higher seed, Luna Rossa Prada Pirelli chose to have Starboard gate position as their preferred starting mark. They would win the series 4-0, making the USA the first challenger team to be knocked out of the competition.

Semifinal			Final
			1	(United Kingdom) Ineos Team UK	1
2	(Italy) Luna Rossa Prada Pirelli	4	2	(Italy) Luna Rossa Prada Pirelli	7
3	(United States) American Magic	0

Race	Date	Time	Port Entry	Starboard Entry	Time	Course	Legs	Start	Gate 1	Gate 2	Gate 3	Gate 4	Gate 5	Gate 6	Gate 7	Finish
1	January 29	+2' 43" (+3,044 m)	(United States) American Magic	(Italy) Luna Rossa Prada Pirelli	26'42"	C	8	(Italy) -0'10"	(Italy) -0'18"	(Italy) -0'22"	(Italy) -0'33"	(Italy) -0'33"	(Italy) -0'58"	(Italy) -2'25"	(Italy) -2'33"	(Italy) -2'43"
2	January 29	26'57"	(Italy) Luna Rossa Prada Pirelli	(United States) American Magic	+3' 07" (+3,206 m)	C	8	(Italy) -0'07"	(Italy) -0'17"	(Italy) -0'22"	(Italy) -0'25"	(Italy) -0'37"	(Italy) -1'06"	(Italy) -1'53"	(Italy) -1'43"	(Italy) -3'07"
3	January 30	26’08"	(Italy) Luna Rossa Prada Pirelli	(United States) American Magic	+0'34" (+549 m)	A	6	(United States) -0'00"	(Italy) -0'13"	(Italy) -0'22"	(Italy) -0'41"	(Italy) -0'20"	(Italy) -0'41"	~	~	(Italy) -0'34"
4	January 30	+3'51" (+3,478 m)	(United States) American Magic	(Italy) Luna Rossa Prada Pirelli	23’30"	A	6	(Italy) -0'03"	(Italy) -0'45"	(Italy) -2'01"	(Italy) -2'42"	(Italy) -2'36"	(Italy) -3'51"	~	~	(Italy) -3'51"
5	~~January 31~~; Cancelled	~	(United States) American Magic	(Italy) Luna Rossa Prada Pirelli	~	Luna Rossa Prada Pirelli wins Series 4-0										
6	~~January 31~~; Cancelled	~	(Italy) Luna Rossa Prada Pirelli	(United States) American Magic	~	Luna Rossa Prada Pirelli wins Series 4-0										
7	~~February 2~~; Cancelled	~	(United States) American Magic	(Italy) Luna Rossa Prada Pirelli	~	Luna Rossa Prada Pirelli wins Series 4-0										

Notes

- American Magic set a new AC75 speed record of 53.3 knots during race 1, nevertheless Luna Rossa won both first-day races.
- During race 4, American Magic suffered mechanical failure, with the boat's starboard cant arm becoming temporarily stuck in the raised position several times, resulting in significant loss of time and penalties from boundary infringement.

== Finals ==
The Prada Cup final determined the Challenger that will face the Defender Emirates Team New Zealand in the 2021 America's Cup, was raced from 13 to 21 February 2021 in a best-of-13 series. As the higher seed, Ineos Team UK chose to have Starboard gate position as their preferred starting mark. Coming into the finals, both teams were undefeated in the immediately proceeding series (the semi-finals for Italy, and the round-robins for the UK). Italy would eventually continue this streak by winning the first 5 of the finals races, and eventually the whole series 7-1.

Races won
Team / Race number	1	2	3	4	5	6	7	8	9	10	11	12	13	Total
(Italy) Luna Rossa Prada Pirelli	●	●	●	●	●		●	●	~	~	~	~	~	7
(United Kingdom) Ineos Team UK						●			~	~	~	~	~	1

Race	Date	Time	Port Entry	Starboard Entry	Time	Course	Legs	Start	Gate 1	Gate 2	Gate 3	Gate 4	Gate 5	Finish
1	February 13	26' 27"	(Italy) Luna Rossa Prada Pirelli	(United Kingdom) Ineos Team UK	+1' 51" (+1,635 m)	A	6	(Italy) -0'54"	(Italy) -1'20"	(Italy) -1'36"	(Italy) -1'54"	(Italy) -1'57"	(Italy) -2'03"	(Italy) -1'51"
2	February 13	+0' 26" (+479m)	(United Kingdom) Ineos Team UK	(Italy) Luna Rossa Prada Pirelli	21' 44"	A	6	(United Kingdom) -0'00"	(Italy) -0'11"	(Italy) -0'17"	(Italy) -0'19"	(Italy) -0'18"	(Italy) -0'26"	(Italy) -0'26"
3	February 14	+0' 13" (+186 m)	(United Kingdom) Ineos Team UK	(Italy) Luna Rossa Prada Pirelli	25' 40"	E	6	(Italy) -0'08"	(Italy) -0'09"	(Italy) -0'06"	(Italy) -0'18"	(Italy) -0'11"	(Italy) -0'10"	(Italy) -0'13"
4	February 14	25'01"	(Italy) Luna Rossa Prada Pirelli	(United Kingdom) Ineos Team UK	+0' 41" (+781m)	E	6	(Italy) -0'05"	(Italy) -0'12"	(Italy) -0'10"	(Italy) -0'21"	(Italy) -0'22"	(Italy) -0'37"	(Italy) -0'41"
5	February 20	28' 19"	(Italy) Luna Rossa Prada Pirelli	(United Kingdom) Ineos Team UK	+1'20" (+1,150 m)	E	6	(United Kingdom) -0'00"	(Italy) -0'15"	(Italy) -0'20"	(Italy) -0'58"	(Italy) -1'01"	(Italy) -1'19"	(Italy) -1'20"
6	February 20	26' 20"	(United Kingdom) Ineos Team UK	(Italy) Luna Rossa Prada Pirelli	+0' 14" (+162 m)	E	6	(United Kingdom) -0'01"	(United Kingdom) -0'08"	(United Kingdom) -0'21"	(United Kingdom) -0'18"	(United Kingdom) -0'32"	(United Kingdom) -0'09"	(United Kingdom) -0'14"
7	February 21	+1' 45" (1,335 m)	(United Kingdom) Ineos Team UK	(Italy) Luna Rossa Prada Pirelli	31' 53"	A	6	(Italy) -0'00"	(Italy) -0'16"	(Italy) -0'21"	(Italy) -1'07"	(Italy) -1'02"	(Italy) -1'45"	(Italy) -1'45"
8	February 21	30' 05"	(Italy) Luna Rossa Prada Pirelli	(United Kingdom) Ineos Team UK	+0' 56" (+730 m)	A	6	(Italy) -0'00"	(Italy) -0'12"	(Italy) -0'12"	(Italy) -0'34"	(Italy) -0'36"	(Italy) -0'53"	(Italy) -0'56"
9	~~February 22~~; Cancelled	~	(Italy) Luna Rossa Prada Pirelli	(United Kingdom) Ineos Team UK	~	Luna Rossa Prada Pirelli wins Series 7-1								
10	~~February 22~~; Cancelled	~	(United Kingdom) Ineos Team UK	(Italy) Luna Rossa Prada Pirelli	~	Luna Rossa Prada Pirelli wins Series 7-1								
11	~~February 23~~; Cancelled	~	(United Kingdom) Ineos Team UK	(Italy) Luna Rossa Prada Pirelli	~	Luna Rossa Prada Pirelli wins Series 7-1								
12	~~February 23~~; Cancelled	~	(Italy) Luna Rossa Prada Pirelli	(United Kingdom) Ineos Team UK	~	Luna Rossa Prada Pirelli wins Series 7-1								
13	~~February 24~~; Cancelled	~	(Italy) Luna Rossa Prada Pirelli	(United Kingdom) Ineos Team UK	~	Luna Rossa Prada Pirelli wins Series 7-1								

Notes

- On February 14, after the conclusion of raceday 2 and with the score at 4-0 towards Italy, the New Zealand government announced that there would be in a "level 3" lockdown for at least 72 hours due to COVID-19 precautions across Auckland. This caused the postponement of raceday 3 (originally scheduled to be held on February 17) although teams were permitted to sail during the lockdown.
- Following disagreements between the challenger of record (Luna Rossa) and the America's Cup authorities about how and when to proceed, racing was agreed to resume on February 20 with raceday 3, with some restrictions to accommodate COVID19 Alert Level 2, and subsequent racedays shifted along the calendar by consequence.
- In race 8 Luna Rossa was penalised for crossing the starting line early and were required to drop 50m behind Ineos Team UK. Having served their penalty the Italian team retook the lead within the first leg of what became the final race of the series.

== See also ==
- Prada Cup
- 2021 America's Cup
- 2019–20 America's Cup World Series
- Italy at the America's Cup
