= AC75 =

Racing yacht used in the 2021 America's Cup

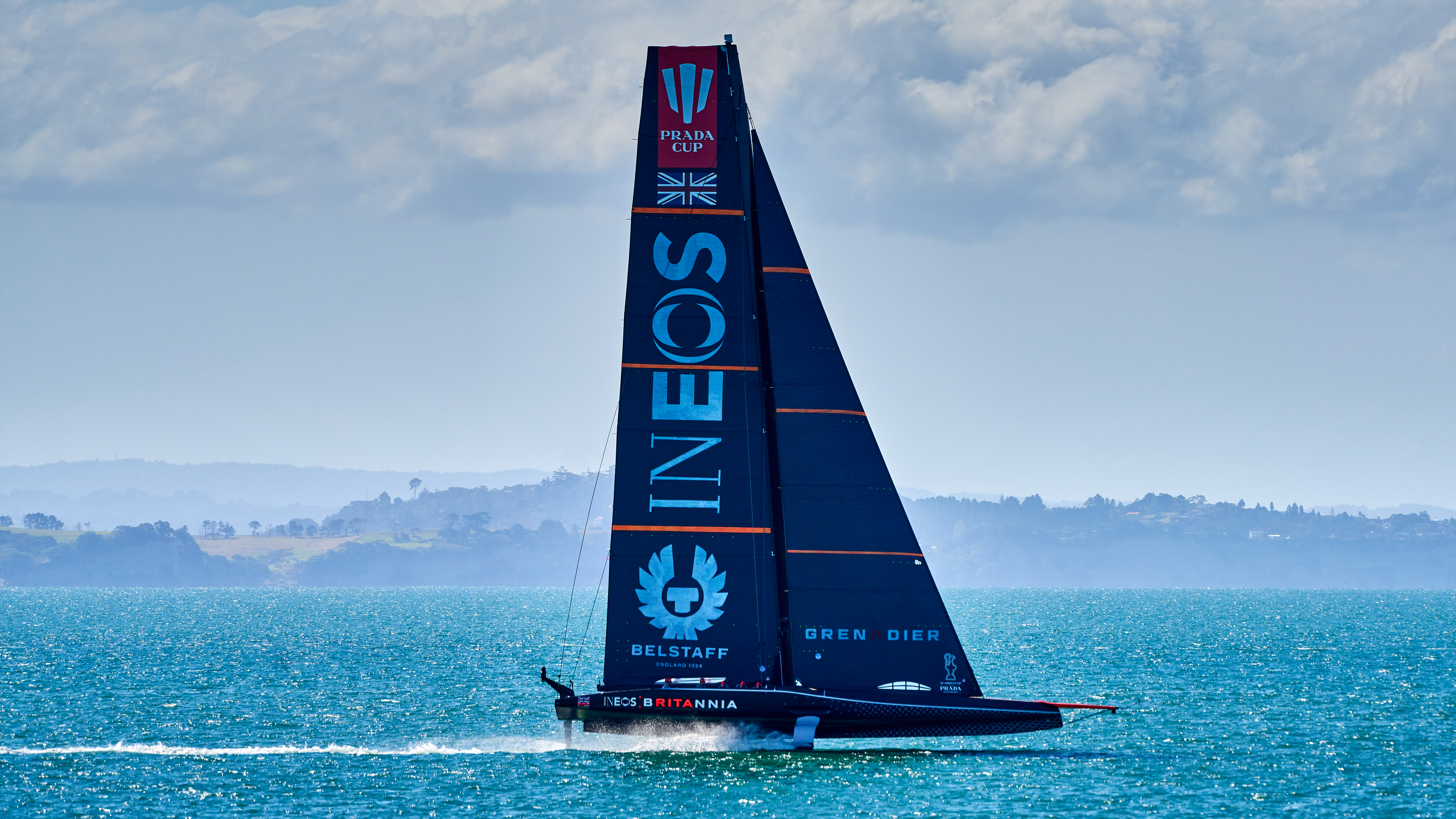
- Ineos Team UK AC75

Development
- Year: 2017 –
- No. built: 8 launched
- Role: inshore racing

Boat
- Crew: 11 + 1 optional guest
- Displacement: 6,450 kg (14,220 lb) lightship 7,600 kg (16,800 lb) loaded
- Draft: 5.00 m (16 ft)

Hull
- Type: Foiling Monohull
- Construction: carbonfiber
- LOA: 22.86 m (75 ft)
- LOH: 20.70 m (68 ft)
- Beam: 5.00 m (16 ft)

Hull appendages
- General: topside-mounted ballasted canting T-wing foils
- Ballast: set in foils
- Rudder: centerline T-wing rudder

Rig
- Rig type: bermuda sloop
- Mast height: 26.50 m (87 ft)

Sails
- General: two semi-battened mainsail skins, one headsail skin
- Mainsail area: 145 m^{2} (1,560 sq ft)
- Jib/genoa area: 90 m^{2} (970 sq ft)
- Spinnaker area: N/A

The AC75 (America's Cup 75) is a racing yacht used in the 36th America's Cup and 37th America's Cup matches and planned to be used for the 38th America's Cup match. The 23 m (75 ft) monohulls feature wing-like sailing hydrofoils mounted under the hull, a soft wingsail, and no keel.

== The rule ==
Following the 2017 America's Cup, winners Royal New Zealand Yacht Squadron accepted a notice of challenge from Circolo della Vela Sicilia stipulating a monohull would be used in 2021. Conceptual graphics of a monohull with soft sails and topside canting hydrofoils were released on 21 November 2017, and the first draft of the class rule was published by the defender and the challenger of record on 29 March 2018. The return to monohulls with soft sails after three America's Cups on multihulls with wingsails is reminiscent of earlier America's Cup classes and seaworthy traditions, but the rule included hydrofoils to attract high performance crews and large TV audiences.

Under the protocol, each competing club could build two yachts, but two-boat testing was excluded except during the PRADA Christmas Cup on 17–20 December 2020, and for the defenders during the PRADA Cup 15 January – 22 February 2021. To reduce design and testing costs of the class unique class features, the rule specified foil controlling systems all manufactured by defender team and foil arms all manufactured by the Challenger of Record's builder Persico Marine.

== List of AC75 yachts ==
Syndicate	Name	Shipyard	Launched	Competitive history	Current	Notes
Emirates Team New Zealand	Te Aihe	ETNZ	Auckland, 6 September 2019	Trial boat (never raced)	Sold to Alinghi as a training boat for AC37. Renamed BoatZero	
(United States) American Magic	Defiant	American Magic	Newport, RI, 14 September 2019	Trial boat (never raced)		
(Italy) Luna Rossa Prada Pirelli	Luna Rossa	Persico Marine	Cagliari, 2 October 2019	Trial boat (never raced)		
(United Kingdom) INEOS Team UK	Britannia	Carrington Boats	Portsmouth, 4 October 2019	Trial boat (never raced)		
(United States) American Magic	Patriot	American Magic	Auckland, 16 October 2020	Raced in the 2021 Prada Cup	Used as training boat for AC37. De-commissioned in February 2023	
(United Kingdom) INEOS Team UK	Britannia	Carrington Boats	Auckland, 17 October 2020	Raced in the 2021 Prada Cup		
(Italy) Luna Rossa Prada Pirelli	Luna Rossa	Persico Marine	Auckland, 20 October 2020	Winner of the 2021 Prada Cup; Lost the 2021 America's Cup to Emirates Team New Zealand (7–3)		
Emirates Team New Zealand	Te Rehutai	ETNZ	Auckland, 18 November 2020	Winner of the 2021 America's Cup	Sold to Team Australia Challenge for AC38	
Emirates Team New Zealand	Taihoro	ETNZ	Auckland, 11 April 2024	Winner of the 2024 America's Cup		
(Italy) Luna Rossa Prada Pirelli	Luna Rossa	Persico Marine	Cagliari, 13 April 2024	Raced in the 2024 Louis Vuitton Cup		
(Switzerland) Alinghi Red Bull Racing	BoatOne	ARBR	Barcelona, 16 April 2024	Raced in the 2024 Louis Vuitton Cup		
(United Kingdom) INEOS Britannia	Britannia	Carrington Boats	Barcelona, 1 May 2024	Winner of the 2024 Louis Vuitton Cup; Lost the 2024 America's Cup to Emirates Team New Zealand (7–2)		
(United States) American Magic	Patriot	American Magic	Barcelona, 7 May 2024	Raced in the 2024 Louis Vuitton Cup		
(France) Orient Express Team	Orient Express	Multiplast	Barcelona, 29 May 2024	Raced in the 2024 Louis Vuitton Cup		

The visible differences between designs have been commented by most of the yachtbuilding community and the specialized press as each of the boats were launched.

== Speeds ==
Potential speed of 50 kn (93 km/h; 58 mph) was claimed based on computer simulations.

Notable high speeds actually recorded in racing were:

- 49.1 kn (90.9 km/h; 56.5 mph) by Te Rehutai (in 15 and 19 kn (28 and 35 km/h; 17 and 22 mph)) on 17 December 2020.
- 50.25 kn (93.06 km/h; 57.83 mph) by Britannia during day 4 of the Prada Cup 23 January 2021.
- 53.31 kn (98.73 km/h; 61.35 mph) by Patriot (American Magic) during day 1 of the Prada Cup Semifinals (in breeze gusting up to 22 kn (41 km/h; 25 mph)) on 29 January 2021.
- 55.2 kn (102.2 km/h; 63.5 mph) by Luna Rossa (Luna Rossa Prada Pirelli) during day 3 of the Louis Vuitton Cup Final on 29 September 2024.
- 55.5 kn (102.8 km/h; 63.9 mph) by Britannia (INEOS Britannia) during day 5 of the Louis Vuitton Cup Final on 1 October 2024.

== Controversy ==
Following the release of the canting hydrofoil design in 2017, Brazilian shipwright Manoel Chaves contacted ETNZ to inform them that he held a patent for the proposed design. Team New Zealand apparently ignored correspondence from Chaves' patent attorneys for over two years before simply dismissing the allegations. ETNZ defended themselves with the statement "every good idea has 1000 fathers".

== See also ==
- America's Cup yacht classes
