= 2000 America's Cup =

Sailing competition in 2000

30th America's Cup
Defender New Zealand
- Defender club: Royal New Zealand Yacht Squadron
- Yacht: NZL 60

Challenger Italy
- Challenger club: Yacht Club Punta Ala
- Yacht: ITA 45

Competition
- Location: Auckland, New Zealand
- 36°50′40″S 174°45′49″E
- Dates: 20 February – 2 March 2000
- Rule: International America's Cup Class
- Winner: Royal New Zealand Yacht Squadron
- Score: 5–0

The 30th America's Cup was won by Team New Zealand, who swept the 2000 Louis Vuitton Cup winner Prada Challenge in all five races. It was the first America's Cup without an American challenger or defender.

== Races ==
Date	Winner	Yacht	Loser	Yacht	Score	Delta
20 February 2000	Team New Zealand	NZL 60	Prada Challenge	ITA 45	1-0	1:07
22 February 2000	Team New Zealand	NZL 60	Prada Challenge	ITA 45	2-0	2:43
26 February 2000	Team New Zealand	NZL 60	Prada Challenge	ITA 45	3-0	1:39
1 March 2000	Team New Zealand	NZL 60	Prada Challenge	ITA 45	4-0	1:49
2 March 2000	Team New Zealand	NZL 60	Prada Challenge	ITA 45	5-0	0:48

== Crew ==
=== Team New Zealand ===
Role	Name
Skipper / Helmsman	Russell Coutts (NZL)
Backup Helmsman	Dean Barker* (NZL)
Tactician	Brad Butterworth (NZL)
Navigator	Tom Schnackenberg (NZL)

* Sailed in Race 5
The crew included Rick Dodson, Hamish Pepper, Jeremy Scantlebury, Murray Jones, Matthew Mason, Jeremy Lomas, Craig Monk, Chris Ward, Grant Loretz, Mike Drummond, Jono Macbeth, Barry McKay, Joe Allen, Nick Heron, Tony Rae, Dean Phipps, Warwick Fleury and Simon Daubney. Peter Blake did not sail with the team in 2000, acting as the on-shore manager.

Peter Evans was the backup tactician and ran the weather programme.

=== Prada Challenge ===
Role	Name
Skipper / Helmsman	Francesco de Angelis (ITA)
Tactician	Torben Grael (BRA)
