= Prada Cup =

Sailing race trophy

- Prada Cup official logo.
- Sport: Sailing match race
- Founded: 2021; 5 years ago
- Related competitions: America's Cup
- Website: Prada Cup

The Prada Cup is the name of the Challenger Selection Series - a sailing competition to determine the Challenger that will earn the right to challenge the Defender for the conquest of the America's Cup. Prior to 2021, the series was named the Louis Vuitton Cup.

== See also ==
- America's Cup
- Louis Vuitton Cup
- Herbert Pell Cup
- Prada Cup 2021
