= Max Sirena =

Italian sailor

Personal information
- Nationality: Italy
- Born: 4 December 1971 (age 54) Rimini, Italy

Sailing career
- Sport: Sailing
- Class: AC75 (2021 Prada Cup)

Massimiliano "Max" Sirena (born 4 December 1971) is an Italian sailor who has competed in multiple America's Cups.

== Biography ==
Sirena sailed with Luna Rossa Challenge in their 2000, 2003 and 2007 Louis Vuitton Cup campaigns as a mid-bowman. Sirena was the wing mast manager for Oracle Racing when they won the 2010 America's Cup.

Sirena skippered Luna Rossa Challenge in the 2013 Louis Vuitton Cup. The team won the 2011 Extreme Sailing Series. After Luna Rossa withdrew from the 2017 America's Cup, Sirena joined Team New Zealand in a management role.

== See also ==
- Italy at the America's Cup
