= American Magic =

American yacht racing team representing the New York Yacht Club

Career
- Yacht club: New York Yacht Club
- Established: 2017
- Nation: United States
- CEO: Mike Cazer
- Skipper: Terry Hutchinson
- Notable victories: 0

Yachts
- Sail no.: Boat name
- The Mule (AM38)
- Defiant (AC75)
- Patriot (AC75)

American Magic is an American yacht racing team formed to compete for the 36th America's Cup. They represent the New York Yacht Club and were formed in 2018 by principals Hap Fauth, Roger Penske, and Doug DeVos.

American Magic was eliminated from the Prada Cup semi-finals by Luna Rossa Prada Pirelli on Saturday 30 January 2021, after 4 consecutive defeats. In August 2021 the Team signaled their intent to race in the 37th America's Cup competition.

== History ==
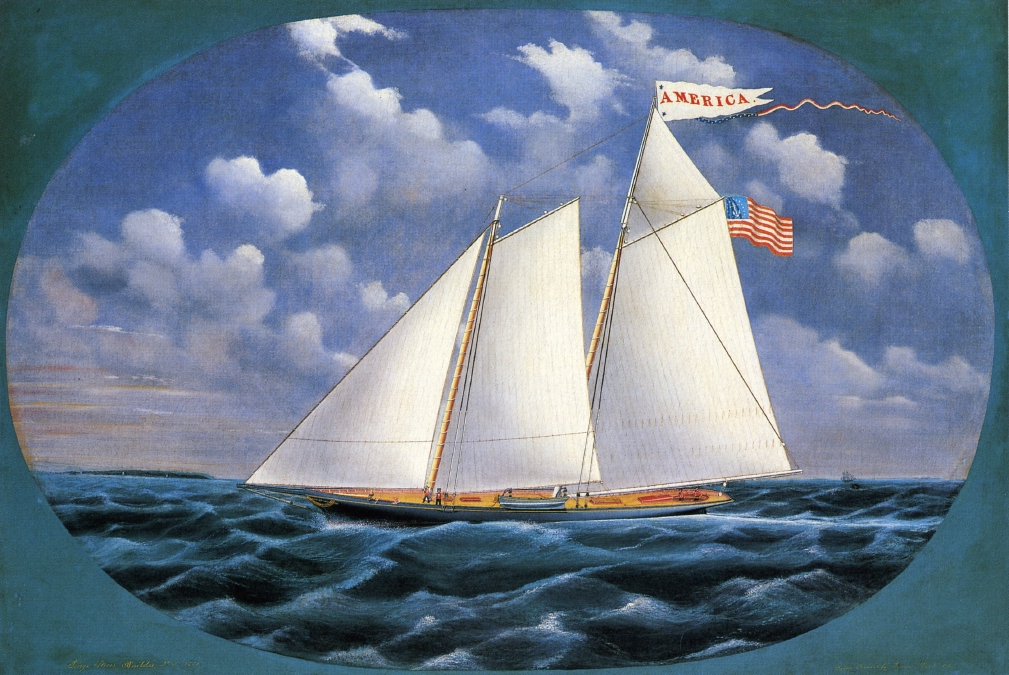
America 1851, by James Bard

The team was established in October 2017 with the intention to return the America's Cup to the United States and the NYYC. Management consists of John J. "Hap" Fauth's Bella Mente Racing, Doug DeVos's Quantum Racing, and Roger Penske under the NYYC burgee.

The Team name, "American Magic" refers to the first Cup winner, the yacht America of 1851, and the first defender, the yacht Magic, who won in 1870. The America's Cup trophy was held by the NYYC for 132 years until 1983. The NYYC's reign was the longest winning streak as measured by years in the history of all sports.

Dean Barker was the helmsman, with Terry Hutchinson as skipper.

As of 2022 their home port is Pensacola, Florida.

=== 36th America's Cup ===
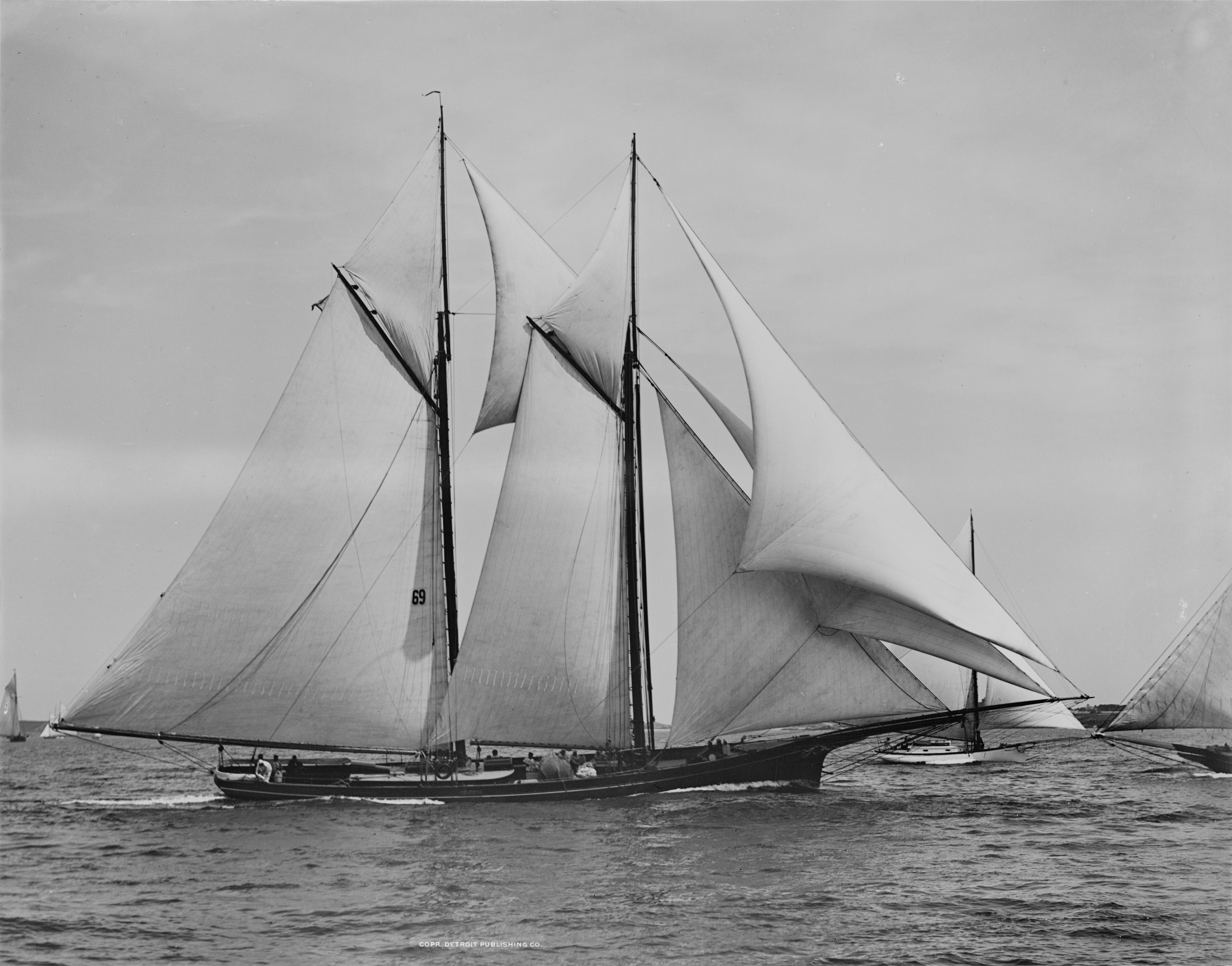
Schooner yacht Magic.

The Team first entered international competition on 15 January 2021 in the 2021 Prada Cup. On 17 January during the round-robin stage Patriot capsized while rounding Gate 5 when a gust of wind caught the sails causing the leeward running back stay to not release and preventing the mainsail from being eased. No crew was reported injured, but the incident caused a large hole in the hull and for a time it was at significant risk of sinking. Hutchinson and Barker were on board. Per race rules, Luna Rossa Challenge was awarded the victory.

The team returned to racing for the Prada Cup Semi-Final, but American Magic was eliminated from the competition by Luna Rossa Prada Pirelli on Saturday 30 January 2021, after 4 consecutive defeats.

=== 37th America's Cup ===
On 16 August 2021, Hap Fauth announced the Team's intention to enter the 37th America's Cup. Further that the Team named Scott Ferguson as lead Design Coordinator, previously with Luna Rossa (Rig Design Manager 2000–2007), Oracle Team USA (Wing / Rig Design Manager 2007–2013, Design Coordinator / Senior Designer 2014–2017).

On 18 February 2022, American Magic announced their leadership team for the 37th America's Cup, with two notable changes, the addition of Mike Cazer as CEO and Tyson Lamond as COO.

In May 2022, AM announced that Australian Tom Slingsby had joined the team. Slingsby won Gold in the 2012 London Olympics in Men's Laser class and was on the 2013 America's Cup-winning Oracle Team USA. A likely competitor for the 37th America's Cup, Team INEOS Britannia skipper Sir Ben Ainslie also won a gold medal in the 2012 Olympics in the Finn class.

=== 38th America's Cup ===
In October 2025 it was announced that American Magic it would not compete in the 38th America's Cup.

In April 2026 AM sold its boats and equipment to American Racing Challenger Team USA, a new team organized by American Ken Read. American Racing Challenger Team USA, representing Sail Newport, confirmed they will enter the 2027 competition, having purchased American Magic's key hardware, including the AC75 yacht Patriot and two AC40 training platforms.

== Fleet ==
The team has two America's Cup 75 class (AC75) boats. The AC75 is a 75FT sailing hydrofoil Mono hull class specifically designed for the 36th America's Cup. The team also built an 'American Magic 38' (AM38) foiling Mono hull using a modified McConaughey 38 Mono hull, known as The Mule.

In May 2024 Clare Harrington, Vice Commodore of the New York Yacht Club, had the honor of christening the team’s AC75 “Patriot.” Sharing the same name as her predecessor, the team’s third AC75 grabs the baton from the previous boat that nearly sank in the 2021 America’s Cup, in hopes of completing what that campaign was not able to finish.

club	yacht name	christening date	builder	notes
New York Yacht Club	The Mule	9 November 2018	American Magic	test boat
New York Yacht Club	Defiant	14 September 2019	American Magic	test boat
New York Yacht Club	Patriot	16 October 2020	American Magic	AC36 race boat
New York Yacht Club	Patriot	May 2024	American Magic	AC37 race boat
