= 2024 America's Cup =

Yacht race

37th America's Cup

Defender New Zealand
- Defender club: Royal New Zealand Yacht Squadron
- Yacht: Taihoro

Challenger United Kingdom
- Challenger club: Royal Yacht Squadron
- Yacht: Britannia

Competition
- Location: Barcelona
- Dates: 12–20 October 2024
- Rule: AC75
- Winner: Royal New Zealand Yacht Squadron
- Score: (New Zealand) 7 (United Kingdom) 2

The 2024 America's Cup was the 37th staging of the America's Cup yacht race. It was contested from 12 October 2024 as a first-to-seven-wins match-race series in Barcelona, Catalonia, Spain, between Taihoro, representing the defender, the Royal New Zealand Yacht Squadron; and Britannia, representing the Royal Yacht Squadron of the United Kingdom, which won the Louis Vuitton Challenger Selections Series, also in Barcelona, on 4 October 2024. It was the first time the UK has sailed in an America's Cup match since 1964.

The Royal New Zealand Yacht Squadron is again the defender of the America's Cup after its yacht Te Rehutai, owned and sailed by the Emirates Team New Zealand syndicate, was the successful defender in the 36th America's Cup, beating the challenger Luna Rossa, representing Circolo della Vela Sicilia, 7–3 in a first-to-seven series raced from 10 to 17 March 2021 in the Waitematā Harbour and Hauraki Gulf off Auckland, New Zealand.

Immediately after Te Rehutai achieved its seventh win in the 36th America's Cup, the Chairman of Royal Yacht Squadron Racing, Bertie Bicket, issued a pre-arranged, "friendly" challenge to the Commodore of the Royal New Zealand Yacht Squadron, Aaron Young. This made Royal Yacht Squadron Racing Ltd the Challenger of Record for the next America's Cup.

The Royal New Zealand Yacht Squadron was founded in 1871 as the Auckland Yacht Club and took its current name in 1902 after receiving a warrant in the name of King Edward VII. Royal Yacht Squadron Racing was founded in 2014 and is an affiliated member of the Royal Yacht Squadron.

== History ==
The America's Cup is the oldest continuous competition in international sport, and the fourth oldest continuous sporting trophy of any kind. As of 31 March 2021, a total of 36 cup matches have been held. With 25 matches the New York Yacht Club has won the most titles so far.

The 36th match from 10 to 17 March 2021 was the Royal New Zealand Yacht Squadron's fourth America's Cup victory, following its wins in 1995, 2000 and 2017, making it the second most successful club in the competition's history. The 2021 win also made the Royal New Zealand Yacht Squadron the only club to have twice successfully challenged for and then defended the America's Cup.

== Terms of Challenge ==
=== Background ===
The challenge by Royal Yacht Squadron to the Royal New Zealand Yacht Squadron was made on board the 110-foot luxury sailing yacht Imagine immediately following the completion of the 10th and final race of the 36th America's Cup on 17 March 2021.

The challenge was a pre-arranged "friendly" challenge arranged by the Royal New Zealand Yacht Squadron and Royal Yacht Squadron Racing Ltd and their respective sailing teams Team New Zealand and Ineos Team UK. The fact of the challenge and some details were made public on 19 March 2021. Both the Royal New Zealand Yacht Squadron and Royal Yacht Squadron Racing Ltd consider the challenge to be valid.

=== Terms of RYS Challenge ===
The full text and terms of the challenge have not been made public, but a number of areas of agreement have been revealed in media statements by the Royal Yacht Squadron and Royal New Zealand Yacht Squadron and their sailing teams, and in subsequent public comments. Royal Yacht Squadron Racing Ltd and Royal New Zealand Yacht Squadron said they would negotiate and issue a protocol to govern the 37th America's Cup by 19 November 2021, eight months after they revealed initial information about the challenge.

==== Yacht class ====
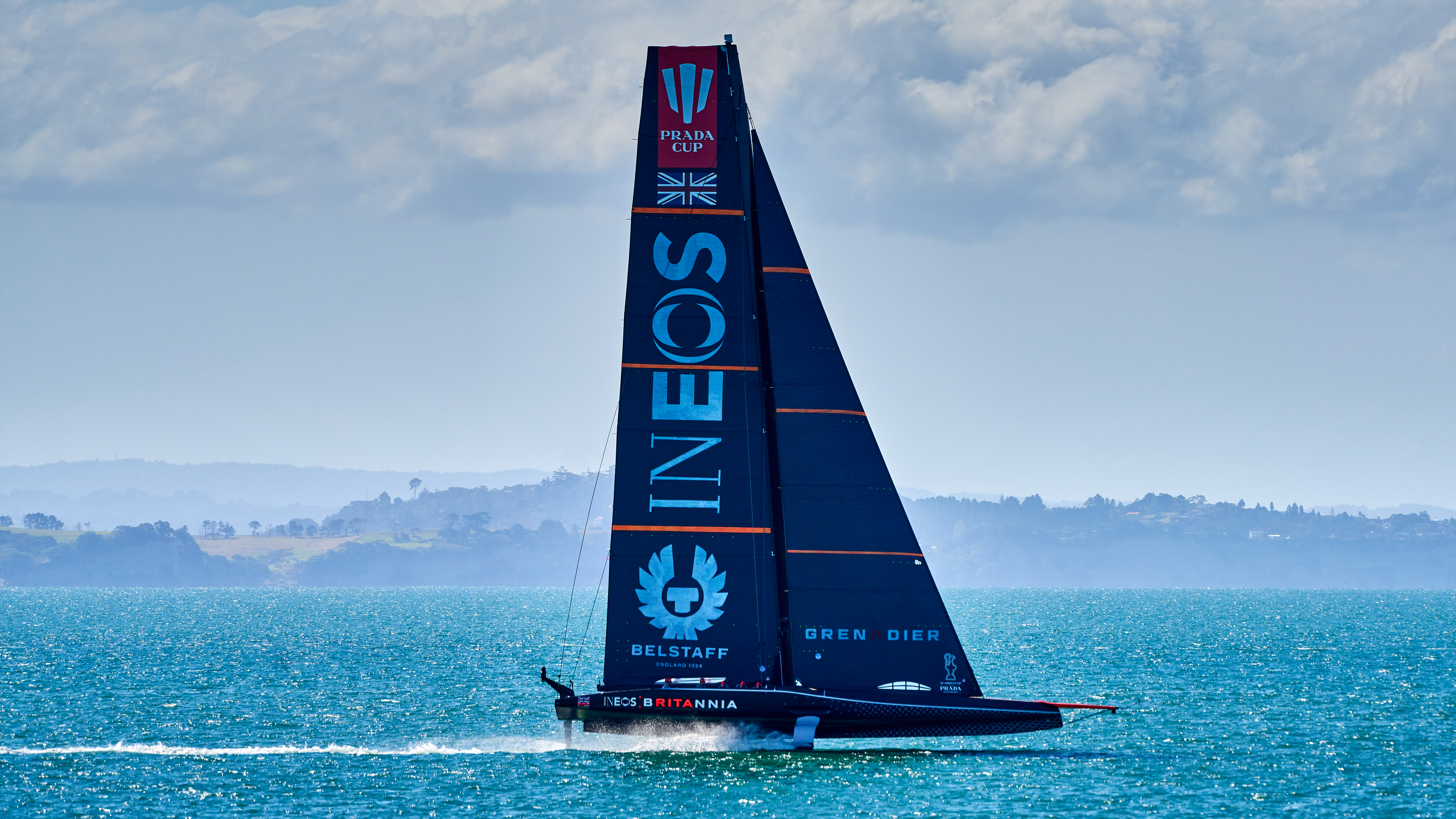
Ineos Team UK's AC75, Britannia, during 2021 Prada Cup

It has been agreed the America's Cup 75 (AC75), a 23 m (75 ft) foiling monohull class developed and used for the first time for the 36th America's Cup shall remain the class of yacht for the 37th America's Cup. Royal Yacht Squadron Racing Ltd and Royal New Zealand Yacht Squadron also intend that the AC75 class should be used for the 38th America's Cup, and say that agreement to this will be a condition of entry for any other complying clubs wishing to enter any challenger series for the 37th America's Cup.

For the first two preliminary regattas as well as the Youth & Women's Americas Cup the AC75 derived AC40 one design class is used. Additionally, the competing teams are allowed to develop 40-foot test boats called LEQ12.

==== Nationality Rules ====
It has been agreed a new crew nationality rule will require 100% of race crews to either be a passport holder of the country the team's yacht club as of 19 March 2021 or to have been physically present in that country (or, acting on behalf of such a yacht club in Auckland, the venue of the 36th America's Cup Events) for two of the previous three years prior to 18 March 2021. There will be a discretionary provision allowing a quota of non-nationals on the race crew for competitors from "emerging nations", although this term and the size of the quota is yet to be defined.

==== Cost Reduction Programme ====
To reduce costs, it has been agreed teams will be restricted to building only one new AC75 for the 37th America's Cup. In addition, Royal Yacht Squadron Racing Ltd and Royal New Zealand Yacht Squadron have committed to "investigating and agreeing a meaningful package of campaign cost reduction measures including measures to attract a higher number of challengers and to assist with the establishment of new teams".

==== Venue ====
Royal Yacht Squadron and Royal New Zealand Yacht Squadron planned to announce the venue for the 37th America's Cup by 19 September 2021. New Zealand Prime Minister Jacinda Ardern said her Government wanted to see the cup defended in Auckland in 2023, and announced the availability of Government funding to assist Team New Zealand to stay together, subject to a number of conditions, including an expectation the Cup will be defended in New Zealand.

However, on 29 March 2022, Barcelona was announced as the host of the 2024 America's Cup. Barcelona's bid saw an unprecedented alliance across public and private entities working together to attract the America's Cup to Barcelona which included the Government of Catalonia, Barcelona City Council, City Hall of Barcelona, Port of Barcelona, Barcelona Global's investment agency and Barcelona & Partners. Of the previous 36 cup matches, 33 have been held in the defender's home waters. The Deed of Gift provides for the defender to name the venue if they and the Challenger of Record cannot reach agreement.

==== Dates ====
The 37th America's Cup will be raced in Barcelona as a first-to-seven-wins series from 12 October 2024. It is expected to be completed on or before 21 October 2024. This complies with the deed which requires the match to be held in summer or summer-shoulder months. In the southern hemisphere, this is defined as between 1 November and 30 April. In the northern hemisphere, it is defined as between 1 May and 31 October.

Schedule of the 37th America's Cup
Year	Date	
2021	17 Nov	AC37 Protocol and AC75 Class Rule V2 Published
2021	1 Dec	Entries for Challengers Open
2022	31 Mar	Defender to announce Match Venue and approximate event dates
2022	17 Jun	New competitors may sail Version 1 AC75s for 20 sailing days
2022	31 Jul	Entry Period Closes
2022	17 Sep	Competitors may sail an AC75 Yacht
2022	30 Nov	ACE to announce race schedule for the Match
2022	30 Nov	ACE to announce racing area for CSS and Match
2022	31 Dec	ACE to publish Brand Manual
2023	31 May	Final cut off for late Challenger entries
2023	30 Jun	ACE to publish Youth and Women's AC Agreement
2023	30 Jun	COR/D to publish Match Conditions
2023	14–17 Sep	Preliminary Regatta Vilanova i la Geltrú
2023	22 Nov – 4 Dec	Preliminary Regatta Jeddah
2023	30 Nov	COR/D to publish CSS Conditions
2024	22–25 Aug	Preliminary Regatta in Barcelona
2024	29 Aug – 8 Sep	Louis Vuitton Cup Round Robins
2024	14–19 Sep	Louis Vuitton Cup Semi-finals
2024	26 Sep – 5 Oct	Louis Vuitton Cup Finals
2024	12–21 Oct	37th America's Cup Match

==== Event management ====
Royal Yacht Squadron and Royal New Zealand Yacht Squadron announced the establishment of a single Event Authority responsible for the conduct of all racing and the management of commercial activities relating to the 37th America's Cup. Therefore, 'ACE (America's Cup Event) Barcelona S.L.' was created as the sole Event Authority for the 37th America's Cup in Barcelona and is exclusively responsible for the planning, management and delivery of a successful event.

== Teams ==
The Royal Yacht Squadron is the Challenger of Record for the 37th America's Cup. Their team, INEOS Britannia, previously lost to Emirates Team New Zealand in the 2017 Louis Vuitton Cup semi-finals, and Luna Rossa Prada Pirelli in the 2021 Prada Cup final. The Royal Yacht Squadron's challenge will be the first time a British team has competed in three consecutive America's Cup cycles since 1930.

Circolo della Vela Sicilia, represented by Luna Rossa Prada Pirelli, have indicated their interest in returning for the 37th America's Cup. Luna Rossa previously lost to Emirates Team New Zealand in the 2021 America's Cup final. In a statement, the team said that they looked "forward to returning to racing on the AC75s in the next edition of the America's Cup".

The New York Yacht Club (NYYC) had indicated interest in returning for the 37th America's Cup. American Magic previously lost to Luna Rossa Prada Pirelli in the 2021 Prada Cup semi-final. The NYYC submitted a challenge to the Royal New Zealand Yacht Squadron on 6 May 2021, alongside an Evolutionary Draft Protocol for the 37th America's Cup. The Royal New Zealand Yacht Squadron released a statement in response, where they said they were "delighted to hear that the New York Yacht Club" were interested, but questioned, "their motives for such a presumptuous statement when entries [did not] open for some time." The Royal Yacht Squadron and Ineos Team UK also released a statement in response to the New York Yacht Club's challenge, stating that they were "working collaboratively with the Royal Yacht Squadron and Team New Zealand".

The NYYC had dropped American Magic and announced a tentative partnership with Stars & Stripes, then announced they would no longer pursue the 37th Americas Cup, and then on 7 January opted back in with American Magic.

In December 2021, Alinghi founder Ernesto Bertarelli and two-time Olympic champion Hans-Peter Steinacher, announced the launch of the new Alinghi Red Bull Racing challenge. Bertarelli will continue to represent the Société Nautique de Genève, the yacht club that won the 2003 Louis Vuitton Cup, the 2003 America's Cup, and the 2007 America's Cup.

On 3 January 2023, the organisers of the 37th America's Cup announced that K-Challenge Racing would challenge for the 37th America's Cup, after previously challenging for the 32nd America's Cup in 2007. Led by Stephane Kandler and Bruno Dubois, the team, named Orient Express Team, represented the Société Nautique de Saint-Tropez.

Team	Yacht Club	Skipper	AC75 Name	Shipyard	Unveiled	Launched	Notes
Emirates Team New Zealand Defender	Royal New Zealand Yacht Squadron	(New Zealand) Peter Burling	Taihoro	Team New Zealand	11 April 2024	12 April 2024	
(Switzerland) Alinghi Red Bull Racing	Société Nautique de Genève	(Switzerland) Arnaud Psarofaghis	BoatOne	Alinghi Red Bull Racing	5 April 2024	16 April 2024	
(Italy) Luna Rossa Prada Pirelli	Circolo della Vela Sicilia	(Italy) Max Sirena	Luna Rossa	Persico Marine	13 April 2024	13 April 2024	
(United States) NYYC American Magic	New York Yacht Club	(United States) Terry Hutchinson	Patriot	American Magic	25 April 2024	7 May 2024	
(United Kingdom) INEOS Britannia Challenger of Record	Royal Yacht Squadron	(United Kingdom) Ben Ainslie	Britannia	Carrington Boats	20 April 2024	26 April 2024	
(France) Orient Express Team	Société Nautique de Saint-Tropez	(France) Quentin Delapierre	Orient Express	Multiplast	25 May 2024	27 May 2024	

== Preliminary Regattas ==
The first two preliminary regattas have been raced in AC40 one design yachts. The third preliminary regatta in Barcelona will see the new AC75 yachts, that will also compete in the challenger series and the America's cup.

Rnd	Host	Dates	Winning team	Yacht class
1	Vilanova i la Geltrú, Spain	14–17 September 2023	(United States) NYYC American Magic	AC40
2	Jeddah, Saudi Arabia	22 November – 4 December 2023	Emirates Team New Zealand	AC40
3	Barcelona, Spain	22–25 August 2024	Emirates Team New Zealand	AC75

=== Round 1 – Vilanova i la Geltrú ===
Pos	Team	Race 1	Race 2	Race 3	Race 4	Race 5	Points
1	(United States) NYYC American Magic	3	5	2	1	1	34
2	Emirates Team New Zealand	4	1	1	4	2	33
3	(France) Orient Express Racing Team	1	3	5	5	3	24
4	(Italy) Luna Rossa Prada Pirelli Team	2	6	3	3	5	20
5	(Switzerland) Alinghi Red Bull Racing	5	2	4	2	6	19
6	(United Kingdom) INEOS Britannia	6	4	6	6	4	9
Citation:

=== Round 2 – Jeddah ===
Pos	Team	Race 1	Race 2	Race 3	Race 4	Race 5	Race 6	Race 7	Race 8	Points
1	Emirates Team New Zealand	1	1	5	2	1	1	3	1	64
2	(Italy) Luna Rossa Prada Pirelli Team	3	4	1	1	2	4	1	DNF	49
3	(Switzerland) Alinghi Red Bull Racing	4	2	3	5	3	3	6	2	35
4	(United States) NYYC American Magic	DSQ	6	DNS	3	4	2	2	3	28
5	(United Kingdom) INEOS Britannia	2	3	4	4	5	5	5	5	26
6	(France) Orient Express Racing Team	5	5	2	6	6	6	4	4	20
Citation:

=== Round 3 – Barcelona ===
Pos	Team	Wins	Losses	Races
1	Emirates Team New Zealand	4	1	5
2	(Italy) Luna Rossa Prada Pirelli Team	4	1	5
3	(United States) NYYC American Magic	3	2	5
4	(United Kingdom) INEOS Britannia	2	3	5
5	(Switzerland) Alinghi Red Bull Racing	1	4	5
6	(France) Orient Express Racing Team	1	4	5
Citation:

Unlike the first rounds which were fleet races, the third is held in match racing format – of 15 races plus a final. The detailed race results for round three, Barcelona, are as follows:

Detailed match race results
Race	Date	Time	Port Entry	Starboard Entry	Time	Course	Legs	Start	Gate 1	Gate 2	Gate 3	Gate 4	Gate 5	Finish
1	22 August	22' 43"	(Switzerland) Alinghi Red Bull Racing	(France) Orient Express Racing Team	+0' 36"		6	(Switzerland) -0' 05"	(Switzerland) -0' 12"	(Switzerland) -0' 13"	(Switzerland) -0' 13"	(Switzerland) -0' 13"	(Switzerland) -0' 22"	(Switzerland) -0' 36"
2	22 August		Emirates Team New Zealand	(Italy) Luna Rossa Prada Pirelli Team	DNF		6	(New Zealand) -0' 00"	(New Zealand) -2' 50"	~	~	~	~	(New Zealand) Awarded
3	22 August	22' 27"	(United States) NYYC American Magic	(United Kingdom) INEOS Britannia	+0' 29"		6	(United Kingdom) -0' 02"	(United States) -0' 06"	(United States) -0' 07"	(United States) -0' 21"	(United States) -0' 25"	(United States) -0' 31"	(United States) -0' 29"
4	22 August	23' 16"	(Italy) Luna Rossa Prada Pirelli Team	(France) Orient Express Racing Team	+1' 33"		6	(Italy) -0' 18"	(Italy) -0' 20"	(Italy) -0' 21"	(Italy) -0' 29"	(Italy) -1' 12"	(Italy) -1' 16"	(Italy) -1' 33"
5	23 August	+0' 56"	(Switzerland) Alinghi Red Bull Racing	(United States) NYYC American Magic	22' 40"		6	(United States) -0' 01"	(United States) -0' 12"	(United States) -0' 15"	(United States) -0' 31"	(United States) -0' 36"	(United States) -0' 46"	(United States) -0' 56"
6	23 August	+0' 52"	(United Kingdom) INEOS Britannia	Emirates Team New Zealand	23' 08"		6	(New Zealand) -0' 29"	(New Zealand) -0' 38"	(New Zealand) -0' 39"	(New Zealand) -0' 55"	(New Zealand) -0' 51"	(New Zealand) -0' 59"	(New Zealand) -0' 52"
7	23 August	+0' 40"	(United States) NYYC American Magic	(Italy) Luna Rossa Prada Pirelli Team	23' 22"		6	(Italy) -0' 14"	(Italy) -0' 17"	(Italy) -0' 17"	(Italy) -0' 21"	(Italy) -0' 18"	(Italy) -0' 35"	(Italy) -0' 40"
8	23 August	DNS	(France) Orient Express Racing Team	Emirates Team New Zealand			6	~	~	~	~	~	~	(New Zealand) Awarded
9	24 August	23' 01"	(United Kingdom) INEOS Britannia	(Switzerland) Alinghi Red Bull Racing	+0' 33"		6	(United Kingdom) -0' 01"	(United Kingdom) -0' 04"	(United Kingdom) -0' 09"	(United Kingdom) -0' 19"	(United Kingdom) -0' 28"	(United Kingdom) -0' 25"	(United Kingdom) -0' 33"
10	24 August	DNS	(United States) NYYC American Magic	(France) Orient Express Racing Team			6	~	~	~	~	~	~	(France) Awarded
11	24 August	23' 56"	(Italy) Luna Rossa Prada Pirelli Team	(United Kingdom) INEOS Britannia	+0' 46"		6	(United Kingdom) -0' 01"	(Italy) -0' 23"	(Italy) -0' 16"	(Italy) -0' 23"	(Italy) -0' 28"	(Italy) -0' 30"	(Italy) -0' 46"
12	24 August	22' 30"	Emirates Team New Zealand	(Switzerland) Alinghi Red Bull Racing	+1' 15"		6	(New Zealand) -0' 00"	(New Zealand) -0' 12"	(New Zealand) -0' 29"	(New Zealand) -0' 45"	(New Zealand) -0' 52"	(New Zealand) -1' 15"	(New Zealand) -1' 15"
13	25 August	+0' 28"	Emirates Team New Zealand	(United States) NYYC American Magic	23' 10"		6	(United States) -0' 00"	(United States) -0' 15"	(United States) -0' 19"	(United States) -0' 35"	(United States) -0' 50"	(United States) -0' 36"	(United States) -0' 28"
14	25 August	26' 46"	(Italy) Luna Rossa Prada Pirelli Team	(Switzerland) Alinghi Red Bull Racing	+0' 46"		6	(Switzerland) -0' 40"	(Switzerland) -0' 34"	(Switzerland) -0' 09"	(Italy) -0' 12"	(Italy) -0' 08"	(Italy) -0' 13"	(Italy) -0' 46"
15	25 August	+0' 48"	(France) Orient Express Racing Team	(United Kingdom) INEOS Britannia	22' 28"		5	(France) -0' 01"	(France) -0' 16"	(United Kingdom) -0' 11"	(United Kingdom) -0' 05"	(United Kingdom) -0' 18"	~	(United Kingdom) -0' 48"
Final	25 August	23' 59"	Emirates Team New Zealand	(Italy) Luna Rossa Prada Pirelli Team	+0' 34"		6	(New Zealand) -0' 01"	(New Zealand) -0' 22"	(New Zealand) -0' 16"	(New Zealand) -0' 19"	(New Zealand) -0' 06"	(New Zealand) -0' 11"	(New Zealand) -0' 34"
Citation:

== Qualifying Event ==
The 2024 Louis Vuitton Cup is the competition to determine the official challenger for the 2024 America's Cup was held between August – October 2024 in Barcelona. The format was a double round-robin of all five challengers plus the defender Team New Zealand (who does not score points), followed by semi-finals of four highest ranked challengers in best of 9 match race series, the winners of which then compete in a best of 13 match race series.

Team	Yacht Club	Skipper	Helmsmen	Completion
(United Kingdom) INEOS Britannia	Royal Yacht Squadron	(United Kingdom) Ben Ainslie	(United Kingdom) Ben Ainslie (United Kingdom) Dylan Fletcher	Winner. Qualified as challenger for the 37th America's Cup
Emirates Team New Zealand	Royal New Zealand Yacht Squadron	(New Zealand) Peter Burling	(New Zealand) Peter Burling (Australia) Nathan Outteridge	Automatically qualified as defender to 37th America's Cup
(Italy) Luna Rossa Prada Pirelli Team	Circolo della Vela Sicilia	(Italy) Max Sirena	(Australia) James Spithill (Italy) Francesco Bruni	Eliminated in final by INEOS Britannia
(United States) NYYC American Magic	New York Yacht Club	(United States) Terry Hutchinson	(Australia) Tom Slingsby (United Kingdom) Paul Goodison (Argentina) Lucas Calabrese	Eliminated in Semi-Final Group 1 by Luna Rossa Prada Pirelli Team
(Switzerland) Alinghi Red Bull Racing	Société Nautique de Genève	(Switzerland) Arnaud Psarofaghis	(Switzerland) Arnaud Psarofaghis (Switzerland) Maxime Bachelin	Eliminated in Semi-Final Group 2 by INEOS Britannia
(France) Orient Express Racing Team	Société Nautique de Saint-Tropez	(France) Quentin Delapierre	(France) Quentin Delapierre (France) Kevin Peponnet	Eliminated after Louis Vuitton Cup Double Round Robin

== Cup Match ==
The America's Cup match was a best of 13 race series held October 2024 between Taihoro, owned and sailed by the Emirates Team New Zealand syndicate representing the Royal New Zealand Yacht Squadron, and INEOS Britannia, the winner of the qualifying event – the 2024 Louis Vuitton Cup. Two races per day were held, starting from 12 October, with reserve days scheduled on 14–15 Oct, 17 and 22–27.

Races won
Team	1	2	3	4	5	6	7	8	9	Total
Emirates Team New Zealand	●	●	●	●			●	●	●	7
(United Kingdom) INEOS Britannia					●	●				2

Race	Date	Time	Port Entry	Starboard Entry	Time	Course	Legs	Start	Gate 1	Gate 2	Gate 3	Gate 4	Gate 5	Gate 6	Gate 7	Finish
1	12 October	27' 01"	Emirates Team New Zealand	(United Kingdom) INEOS Britannia	+0' 41" (+422 m)	A	6	(New Zealand) −0' 02"	(New Zealand) −0' 24"	(New Zealand) −0' 15"	(New Zealand) −0' 36"	(New Zealand) −0' 40"	(New Zealand) −0' 56"	-	-	(New Zealand) −0' 41"
2	12 October	+0' 27" (+293 m)	(United Kingdom) INEOS Britannia	Emirates Team New Zealand	28' 23"	A	8	(New Zealand) −0' 00"	(New Zealand) −0' 11"	(New Zealand) −0' 09"	(New Zealand) −0' 14"	(New Zealand) −0' 10"	(New Zealand) −0' 28"	(New Zealand) −0' 32"	(New Zealand) −0' 33"	(New Zealand) −0' 27"
3	13 October	+0' 52" (+657 m)	(United Kingdom) INEOS Britannia	Emirates Team New Zealand	27' 06"	D	6	(New Zealand) −0' 03"	(New Zealand) −0' 19"	(New Zealand) −0' 27"	(New Zealand) −0' 32"	(New Zealand) −0' 33"	(New Zealand) −0' 43"	-	-	(New Zealand) −0' 52"
~~4~~	13 October	Postponed				~										
4	14 October	26' 50"	Emirates Team New Zealand	(United Kingdom) INEOS Britannia	+0' 23" (+357 m)	D	6	(New Zealand) −0' 00"	(New Zealand) −0' 00"	(New Zealand) −0' 03"	(New Zealand) −0' 13"	(New Zealand) −0' 15"	(New Zealand) −0' 24"	-	-	(New Zealand) −0' 23"
5	16 October	+1' 18" (+1,167 m)	Emirates Team New Zealand	(United Kingdom) INEOS Britannia	24' 15"	B	6	(New Zealand) −0' 05"	(United Kingdom) −2' 15"	(United Kingdom) −1' 59"	(United Kingdom) −1' 37"	(United Kingdom) −1' 36"	(United Kingdom) −1' 29"	-	-	(United Kingdom) −1' 18"
6	16 October	28' 13"	(United Kingdom) INEOS Britannia	Emirates Team New Zealand	+0' 07" (+74 m)	B	8	(United Kingdom) −0' 00"	(United Kingdom) −0' 08"	(United Kingdom) −0' 09"	(United Kingdom) −0' 09"	(United Kingdom) −0' 16"	(United Kingdom) −0' 13"	(United Kingdom) −0' 07"	(United Kingdom) −0' 07"	(United Kingdom) −0' 07"
7	18 October	+1' 13" (+1,125 m)	(United Kingdom) INEOS Britannia	Emirates Team New Zealand	24' 49"	F	6	(United Kingdom) −0' 01"	(New Zealand) −0' 12"	(New Zealand) −0' 13"	(New Zealand) −0' 24"	(New Zealand) −0' 29"	(New Zealand) −0' 53"	-	-	(New Zealand) −1' 13"
8	18 October	26' 37"	Emirates Team New Zealand	(United Kingdom) INEOS Britannia	+0' 55" (+1,048 m)	F	8	(New Zealand) −0' 00"	(New Zealand) −0' 15"	(New Zealand) −0' 25"	(New Zealand) −0' 41"	(New Zealand) −0' 36"	(New Zealand) −0' 23"	(New Zealand) −0' 27"	(New Zealand) −0' 50"	(New Zealand) −0' 55"
9	19 October	26' 43"	Emirates Team New Zealand	(United Kingdom) INEOS Britannia	+0' 37" (+571 m)	B	6	(United Kingdom) −0' 00"	(New Zealand) −0' 19"	(New Zealand) −0' 22"	(New Zealand) −0' 00"	(New Zealand) −0' 12"	(New Zealand) −0' 17"	-	-	(New Zealand) −0' 37"
Citation:

== Youth & Women's Americas Cup ==
=== PUIG Women's Americas Cup ===
In October 2024, Giulia Conti became the first Women's America's Cup Champion, winning the 1st PUIG Women's America Cup in Barcelona as Captain of the Luna Rossa Prada Pirelli Team representing Circolo della Vela Sicilia

=== Background ===
Alongside the protocol for the 37th Americas Cup, a Youth & Women's event was announced to be held in the AC40 class racing in Barcelona alongside the Americas Cup. The youth event is open to sailors under 25 years of age, with two male and two female sailors on each boat, while the women's event is open to any female sailors.

=== Teams ===
Team	Yacht Club	Skipper	Training Platform
Emirates Team New Zealand	Royal New Zealand Yacht Squadron	(New Zealand) Josh Junior	ETF26; AC40
(Switzerland) Alinghi Red Bull Racing	Société Nautique de Genève	(Austria) Hans Peter Steinacher	69F; TF35
(Italy) Luna Rossa Prada Pirelli	Circolo della Vela Sicilia	(Italy) Max Sirena	69F
(United States) NYYC American Magic	New York Yacht Club	(United States) Terry Hutchinson	69F
(United Kingdom) Athena Pathway	Royal Yacht Squadron	(United Kingdom) Hannah Mills	ETF26; Waszp
(France) Orient Express Team	Société Nautique de Saint-Tropez	(France) Quentin Delapierre	
(Spain) Sail Team BCN	Real Club Náutico de Barcelona	(Spain) Guillermo Altadill	
(Netherlands) Jajo Team DutchSail	Koninklijke Roei- en Zeilvereniging De Maas; Koninklijke Nederlandsche Zeil- en Roeivereeniging	(Netherlands) Simeon Tienpont	69F; Waszp
(Canada) Concord Pacific Racing	Royal Vancouver Yacht Club	(Canada) Isabella Bertold (Canada) Andrew Wood	
AC Team Germany	Kieler Yacht-Club; Norddeutscher Regatta Verein	(Germany) Carolina Werner (Germany) Marc Pickel	
(Sweden) Swedish Challenge powered by Artemis Technologies	Royal Gothenburg Yacht Club; Royal Swedish Yacht Club	(Sweden) Anna Östling	Waszp
Andoo Team Australia	Cruising Yacht Club of Australia	(Australia) Olivia Price (Australia) Nina Curtis	

=== Trophy ===
The Youth America's Cup trophy is sponsored by UniCredit and was made by British silverware manufacturer Thomas Lyte. It is composed of silver and gold, weighs approximately 13 kg (including the base), measures 50 cm tall, and is 60 cm wide, featuring the design of a bowline knot.
