= Aotearoa (yacht) =

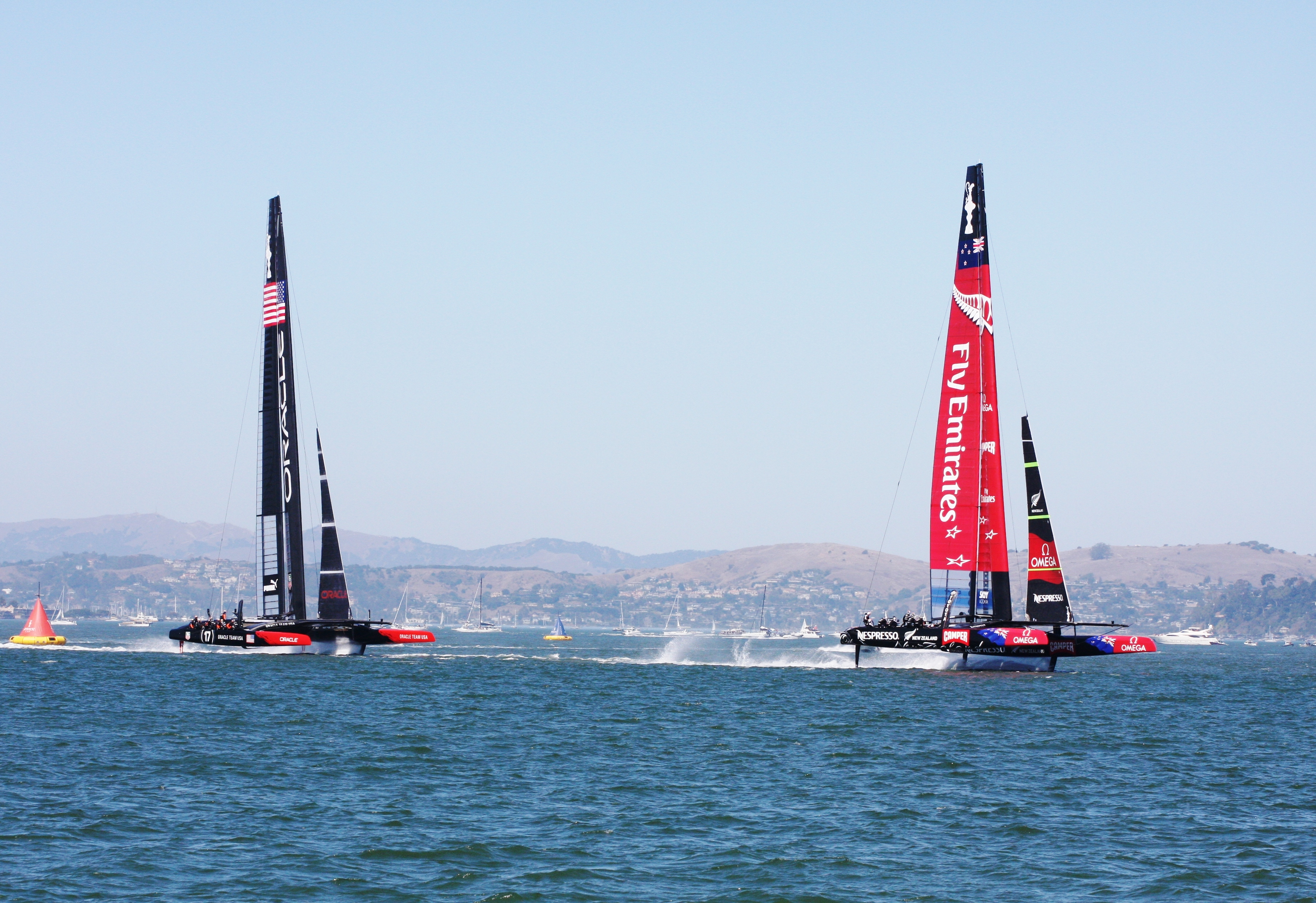
- Aotearoa leading Oracle Team USA 17 at the first mark in the first race of the 2013 America's Cup
- Yacht club: Royal New Zealand Yacht Squadron
- Nation: New Zealand
- Class: AC72
- Sail no: NZL–5
- Builder: Cookson Boats
- Launched: 2013
- Owner(s): Emirates Team New Zealand

Racing career
- Skippers: Dean Barker
- Notable victories: 2013 Louis Vuitton Cup
- America's Cup: 2013 America's Cup
- AC Challenger Selection Series: 2013 Louis Vuitton Cup

Aotearoa is an AC72 class catamaran of Emirates Team New Zealand that unsuccessfully challenged for the 2013 America's Cup. It was built for Emirates Team New Zealand for the 2013 Louis Vuitton Cup.

== Career ==
Aotearoa lost to Oracle Team USA 17 of Oracle Team USA by 8–9 in the 2013 America's Cup. Aotearoa had the highest measured speed in the competition, 47.57 knots (88.10 km/h; 54.74 mph)
