= Long Beach Yacht Club, California =

Private Yacht Club in Long Beach

Long Beach Yacht Club
- Burgee
- Short name: LBYC
- Founded: 1929
- Location: 6201 E. Appian Way Long Beach, CA 90803 United States
- Website: www.lbyc.org

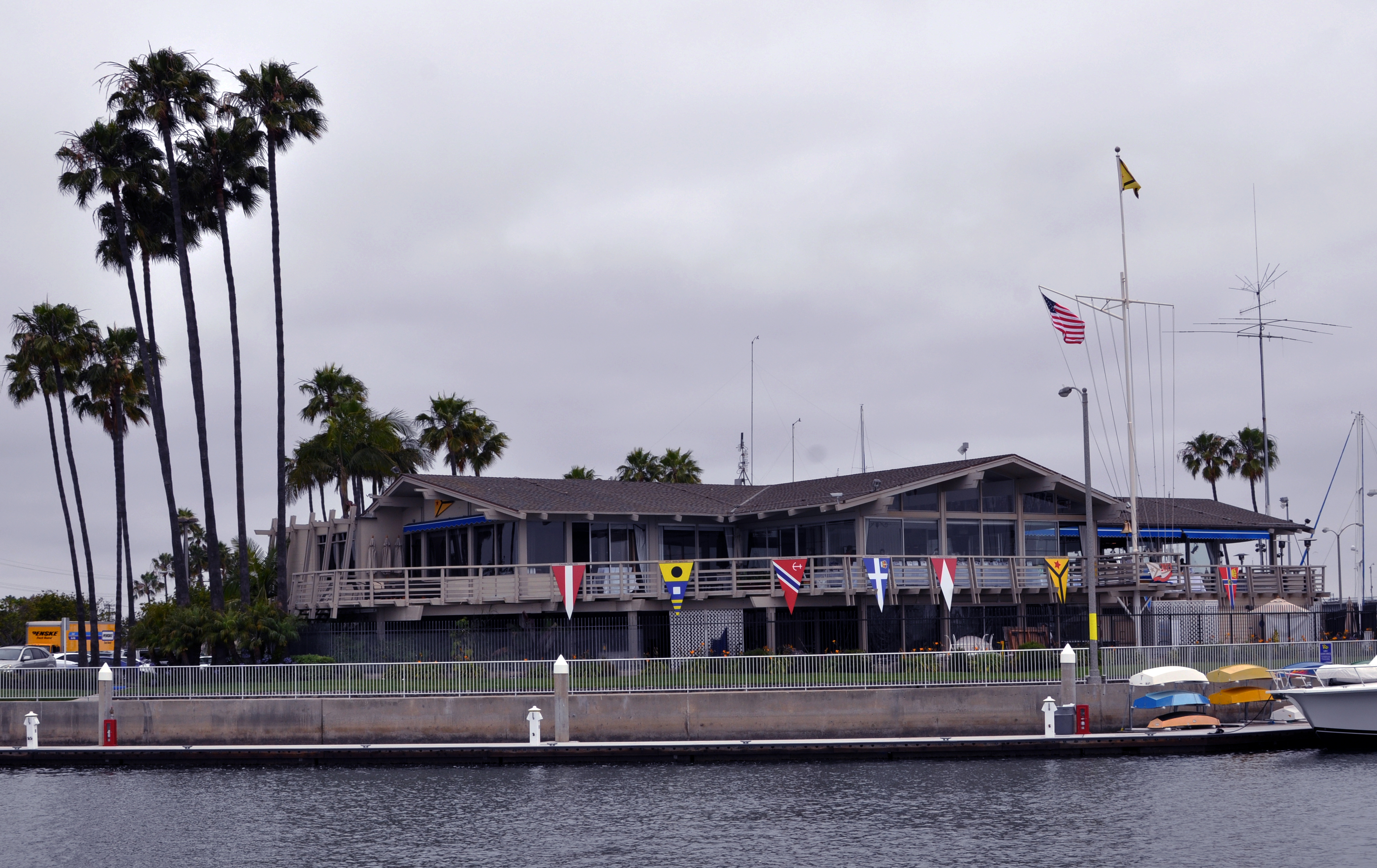
Clubhouse.

Long Beach Yacht Club is a private yacht club in Long Beach, California. It was founded in 1929.

In November 2018 it was announced that the club has officially challenged for the 2021 America's Cup in January and February 2021 in Auckland, NZ.

== Regattas ==
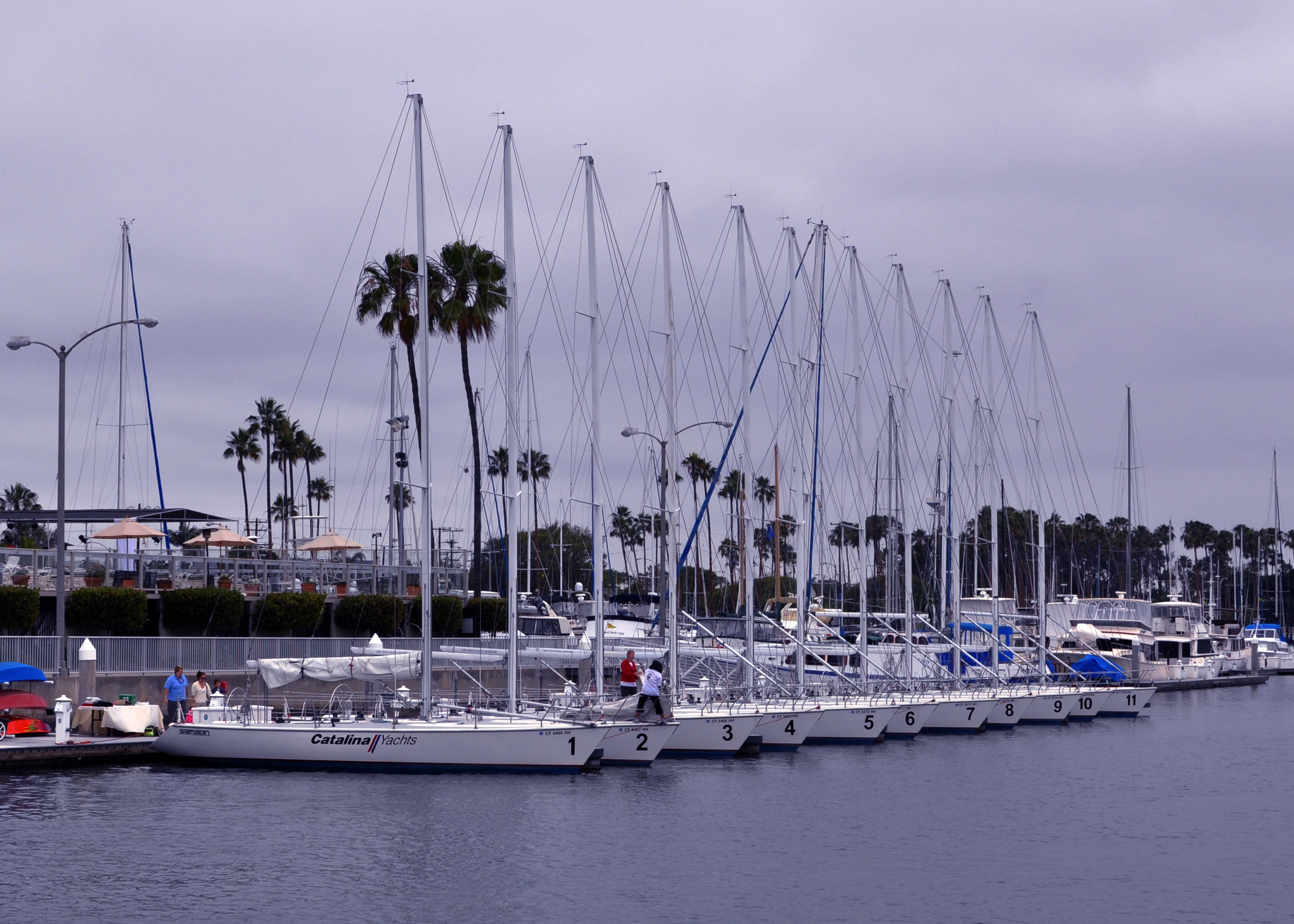
The Long Beach Yacht Club Congressional Cup racing fleet

The club maintains a fleet of Catalina 37 limited production racing boats, specifically designed race in the Congressional Cup, an event hosted by LBYC.

Long Beach Race Week is hosted by the Alamitos Bay Yacht Club and the Long Beach Yacht Club. is the Southern California Keel Boat championship that has ushered summer into Southern California for 35 years.

By the end of 2018, The Americas Cup Committee accepted a second American challenge from Taylor Canfield and the LBYC. This makes a total of 6 teams competing in The PRADA Cup Challenger Selection Series for the right to challenge the Royal New Zealand Yacht Squadron for the America's Cup in early 2021.

By the beginning of 2020, the LBYC challenge was considered doubtful.

== Junior Sailing Program ==
The Long Beach Yacht Club Junior Sailing Program runs June 17-August 2. It is open to LBYC member families with children ages 6–17.
