= Oracle Team USA 17 =

AC72 class catamaran of Oracle Team USA

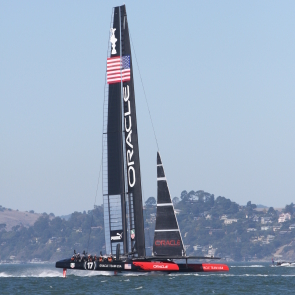
- Oracle Team USA 17 during the 2013 America's Cup.
- Yacht club: Golden Gate Yacht Club
- Nation: United States
- Class: AC72
- Sail no: USA–17
- Launched: April 23, 2013
- Owner(s): Oracle Team USA

Racing career
- Skippers: James Spithill
- Notable victories: 2013 America's Cup
- America's Cup: 2013 America's Cup

Oracle Team USA 17 is an AC72 class catamaran of Oracle Team USA that successfully defended the 2013 America's Cup. The yacht was donated to the Mariners' Museum in Newport News, Virginia, where, as of 2017, it is on display.

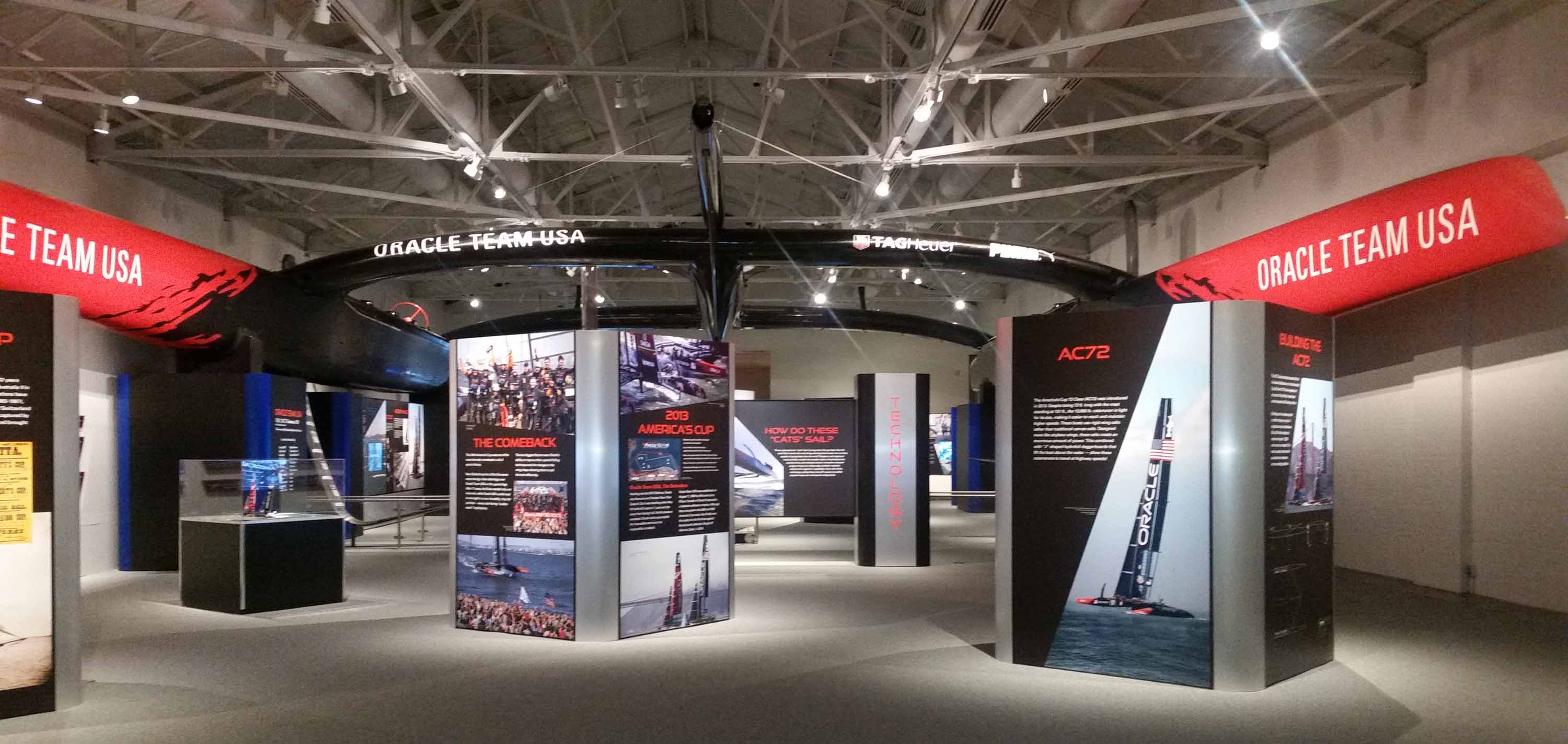
AC72 on Display at The Mariners' Museum

== Career ==
Oracle Team USA 17 was launched on April 23, 2013. Oracle Team USA 17 won against Aotearoa of Emirates Team New Zealand by 9–8 in the 2013 America's Cup.
