= Te Rehutai =

AC75 foiling monohull yacht

Te Rehutai is the AC75 foiling monohull yacht that Emirates Team New Zealand used to successfully defend the America's Cup for the Royal New Zealand Yacht Squadron in March 2021. It beat the winner of the 2021 Prada Cup, Luna Rossa Prada Pirelli, representing Circolo della Vela Sicilia of Italy, 7–3 in a first to seven series raced from 10 to 17 March 2021. Both the Prada Cup and the America's Cup were held in Auckland, New Zealand, after Emirates Team New Zealand regained the Cup for the Royal New Zealand Yacht Squadron in 2017, beating Oracle Team USA, representing the Golden Gate Yacht Club, 7–1 in Bermuda.

The racing took place in the Waitematā Harbour and Hauraki Gulf, off Auckland. It was the 36th America's Cup regatta since the competition began in 1851, and the third time the Royal New Zealand Yacht Squadron defended the Cup in Auckland, after its successful defence in 2000 and unsuccessful defence in 2003.

In December 2020, Te Rehutai won the warm-up America's Cup World Series regatta in Auckland against the three yachts competing in the Prada Cup to become the challenger for the 36th America's Cup. Te Rehutai won five of its six races, beating both Britannia, sailed by Ineos Team UK for the Royal Yacht Squadron, and Luna Rossa, sailed by Luna Rossa Challenge for Circolo della Vela Sicilia, 2–0, but lost one of its two races to Patriot, sailed by American Magic for the New York Yacht Club.

Te Rehutai is Māori for "the sea-spray". The name's significance has been explained as, "where the essence of the ocean invigorates and energises our strength and determination". Te Rehutai was Emirates Team New Zealand's second AC75, after its earlier test boat Te Aihe, which means "dolphin" in English, was launched in September 2019. In January 2020, Emirates Team New Zealand also launched a smaller foiling monohull called Te Kāhu, which means "hawk" in English, for training and development purposes.
