= Team New Zealand =

New Zealand sailing team

- Emirates Team New Zealand

Career
- Yacht club: Royal New Zealand Yacht Squadron
- Established: 1993
- Nation: New Zealand
- Team principal(s): Matteo de Nora
- CEO: Grant Dalton
- Skipper: Nathan Outteridge
- Notable sailors: Sir Peter Blake; Russell Coutts; Dean Barker; Glenn Ashby; Peter Burling
- Notable victories: 1995 Louis Vuitton Cup; 1995 America's Cup; 2000 America's Cup; 2007 Louis Vuitton Cup; 2013 Louis Vuitton Cup; 2017 Louis Vuitton Cup; 2017 America's Cup; 2021 America's Cup; 2024 America's Cup

Yachts
- Sail no.: Boat name
- NZL–84: NZL 84
- NZL–92: NZL 92
- NZL–5: Aotearoa
- Te Rehutai
- Taihoro

Team New Zealand or TNZ is a sailing team based in Auckland, New Zealand, representing the Royal New Zealand Yacht Squadron. The team has been branded as Emirates Team New Zealand at America's Cup competitions since 2007. Emirates Team New Zealand has appeared in every Cup match since 2013 and with three America’s Cup wins is the most successful syndicate of the modern era.

Team New Zealand became a household name in their home country following their consecutive wins in the America's Cup in 1995 and 2000, under the leadership of Sir Peter Blake, when becoming the first team from a country outside the United States to win and successfully defend the America's Cup.

Team New Zealand won the 2017 America's Cup, skippered by Glenn Ashby. They successfully defended the title at the America's Cup in 2021 and 2024. They are also the winners of the Louis Vuitton Cup in 1995, 2007, 2013, and 2017.

== History ==
Three challenges were launched before the founding of Team New Zealand, all of these backed by Michael Fay. New Zealand Challenge competed in the 1987 Louis Vuitton Cup, the 1988 America's Cup and the 1992 Louis Vuitton Cup.

=== Founding ===
Following the 1992 competition, Michael Fay withdrew from backing the New Zealand challenges and a new effort under the leadership of Sir Peter Blake began putting a team together, raising funds and gaining support for the Royal New Zealand Yacht Squadron. Team New Zealand Limited was established as a registered company in 1993.

=== 1995: Black Magic ===
In 1995, TNZ beat Team Dennis Conner 5–0 in a major upset off San Diego, California after winning the right to challenge in the Louis Vuitton Cup. Their boats were fast, they had an experienced crew led by skipper Russell Coutts, and they were ably led by Sir Peter Blake. As NZL 32 approached the finish line on the last race, sailing commentator Pete Montgomery made the now famous line "The America's Cup is now New Zealand's cup!"

The winning yacht, NZL 32, was shipped back to New Zealand and given to the Te Papa Museum, and is now housed in an extension to the northern end of the National Maritime Museum in Auckland as part of a permanent exhibition, Blue Water, Black Magic, about Sir Peter Blake.

=== 2000: "Still New Zealand's Cup" ===
TNZ (NZL 60) beat Italy's Prada Challenge (Luna Rossa) 5–0 in the 2000 match held on Auckland's Hauraki Gulf. On crossing the finish line in the final race, commentator Peter Montgomery exclaimed "The America's Cup is still New Zealand's cup!!" – echoing his comment in 1995 America's Cup. A notable feature was Russell Coutts handing over the helm to Dean Barker in the final race.

=== 2003: "Loyal"; Defeat ===
In 2003, Team New Zealand's eight-year reign ended after they were defeated 5–0 by Swiss-based challenger Alinghi. TNZ dubbed their campaign the "Loyal" campaign, featuring a Silver fern flag with the word "Loyal" and an existing song of the same name by New Zealand musician Dave Dobbyn. This was largely due to the Swiss boat featuring many of the afterguard members from TNZ's previous campaigns (notably Russell Coutts and Brad Butterworth) which, along with a fast boat and a lack of reliability aboard TNZ's NZL 82, contributed to the win.

=== 2007: Emirates Team New Zealand ===
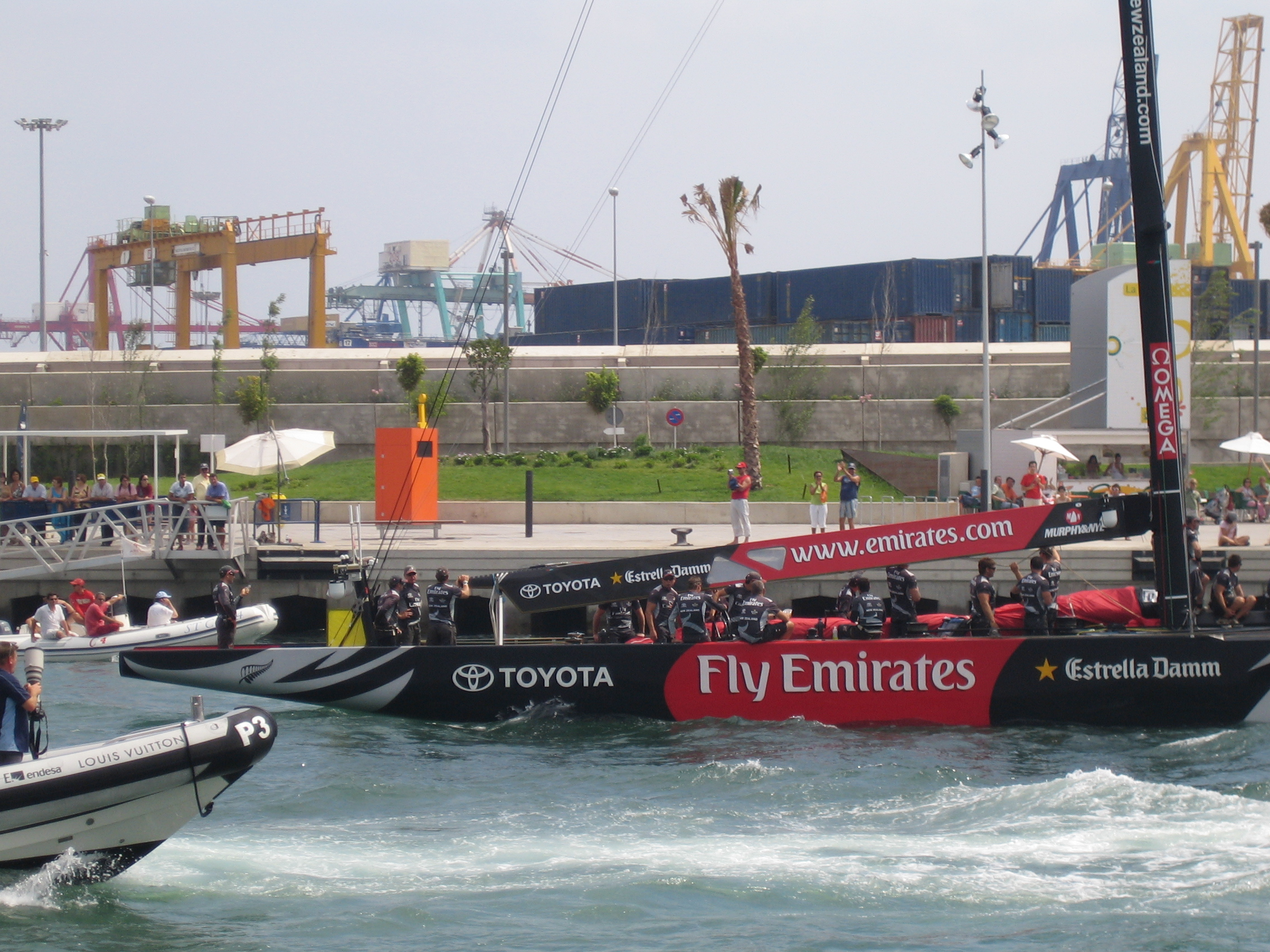
NZL-92 returning to port in Valencia during the America's Cup regatta

In 2007, the re-branded Emirates Team New Zealand won the Louis Vuitton Cup and advanced to the 32nd America's Cup against defenders Alinghi. Team New Zealand lost the series 2–5 to Alinghi, the last by a single second.

==== Valencia ====
In late 2003, TNZ announced their intention to challenge Alinghi at the 2007 Valencia America's Cup, with Emirates on board as title sponsor, and Grant Dalton as Team Boss. Dean Barker skippered a more international team than ever before. TNZ were among the "big four" syndicates leading up to the 2007 Cup. The big four consisted of TNZ, Alinghi, BMW Oracle Racing, and Luna Rossa.

In the Louis Vuitton Cup 2007 to select the challenger to face Alinghi, TNZ lost their first match to Mascalzone Latino-Capitalia Team, a team who they had beaten in each of their five encounters in the Louis Vuitton Acts. They then won their next 7 races, before losing the final two in round robin 1 to Luna Rossa and BMW Oracle Racing which put them in third place at the end of the first round robin. In Round Robin 2, Team New Zealand were undefeated throughout, taking first place from BMW Oracle Racing. They won their semi-final series 5–2 against Desafío Español 2007 and qualified for the Louis Vuitton finals against Luna Rossa. In the finals, they defeated Luna Rossa with a whitewash victory of 5–0, winning the Louis Vuitton Cup and the right to challenge Alinghi for the America's Cup.

On 3 July 2007, Emirates Team New Zealand lost their final race to Alinghi bringing Alinghi's race wins to 5, successfully defending the 32nd America's cup.

Americas Cup...

- Race 1: Lost to Alinghi by 35 seconds
- Race 2: Beat Alinghi by 28 seconds
- Race 3: Beat Alinghi by 25 seconds
- Race 4: Lost to Alinghi by 30 seconds
- Race 5: Lost to Alinghi by 19 seconds
- Race 6: Lost to Alinghi by 28 seconds
- Race 7: Lost to Alinghi by 1 second

Alinghi won the America's Cup, 5–2.

=== 2009 Louis Vuitton Pacific Series ===
Team New Zealand hosted the Louis Vuitton Pacific Series in January and February 2009 on the Waitematā Harbour in the Hauraki Gulf, Auckland. Team New Zealand defeated Alinghi by a margin of 3 races to 1 in the final. The final races were reduced to the best of five due to difficult weather conditions resulting in the loss of one day's racing.

=== 2010 Louis Vuitton Trophy ===
In March 2010, the Louis Vuitton Trophy regatta returned to Auckland after the first regatta of the series in Nice in November 2009 won by Italy's Azzurra team. On Sunday 21 March 2010, Emirates Team New Zealand won the final of the Louis Vuitton Trophy Auckland regatta with a 56 sec win over Mascalzone Latino.

=== 2011–12 Volvo Ocean Race ===
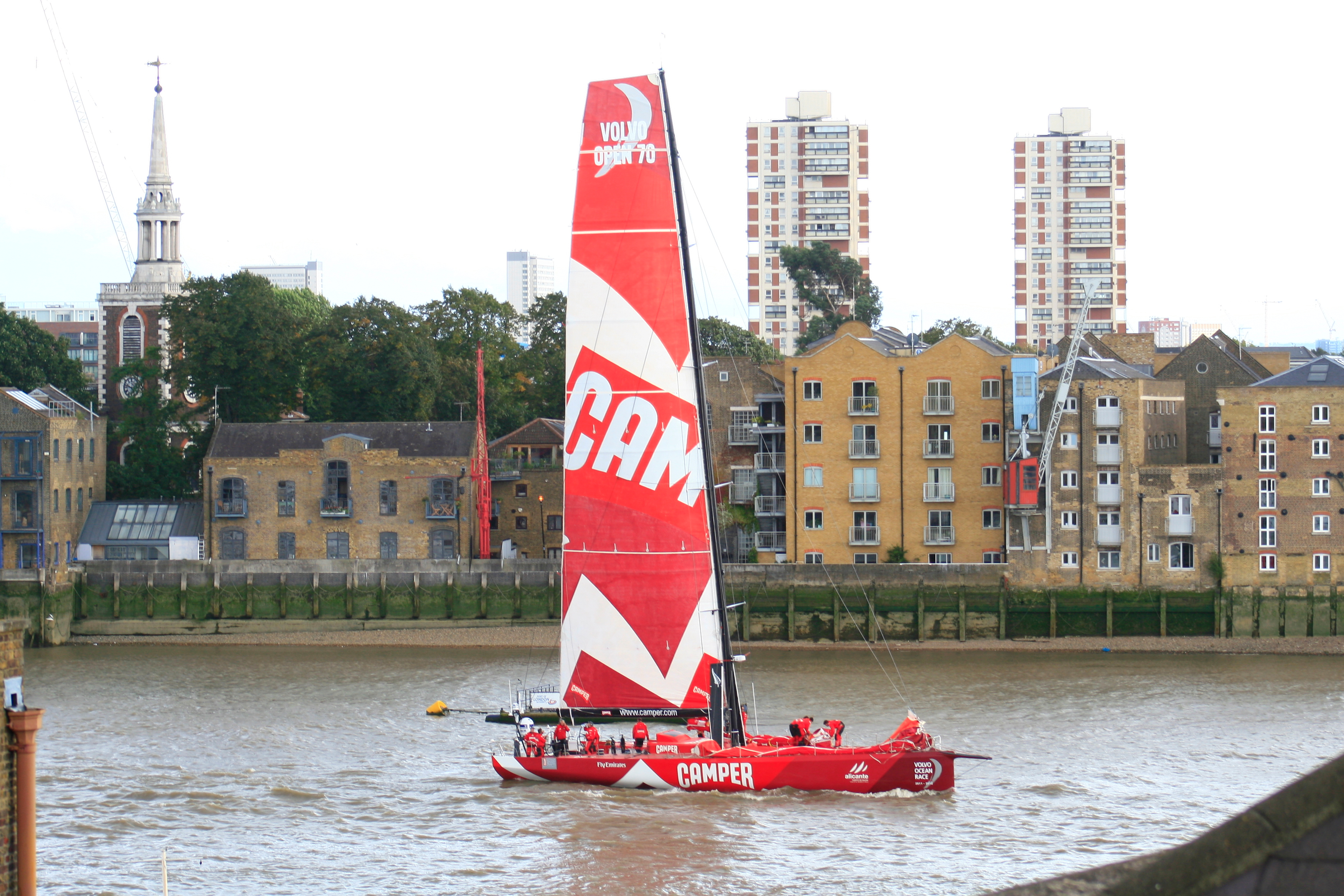
Team New Zealand's Volvo Open 70 in London, September 2011.

On 13 April 2010, along with Camper, the Spanish-based international footwear manufacturer, Emirates Team New Zealand announced that it would compete in the Volvo Ocean Race in 2011–12.

The campaign was run by Emirates Team New Zealand and skippered by Olympic and round-the-world yachtsman Chris Nicholson. Racing was very close with results of each leg often coming down to minutes and seconds at the finish line after thousands of miles of ocean racing. Emirates Team New Zealand came in second.

=== 2013 America's Cup San Francisco ===
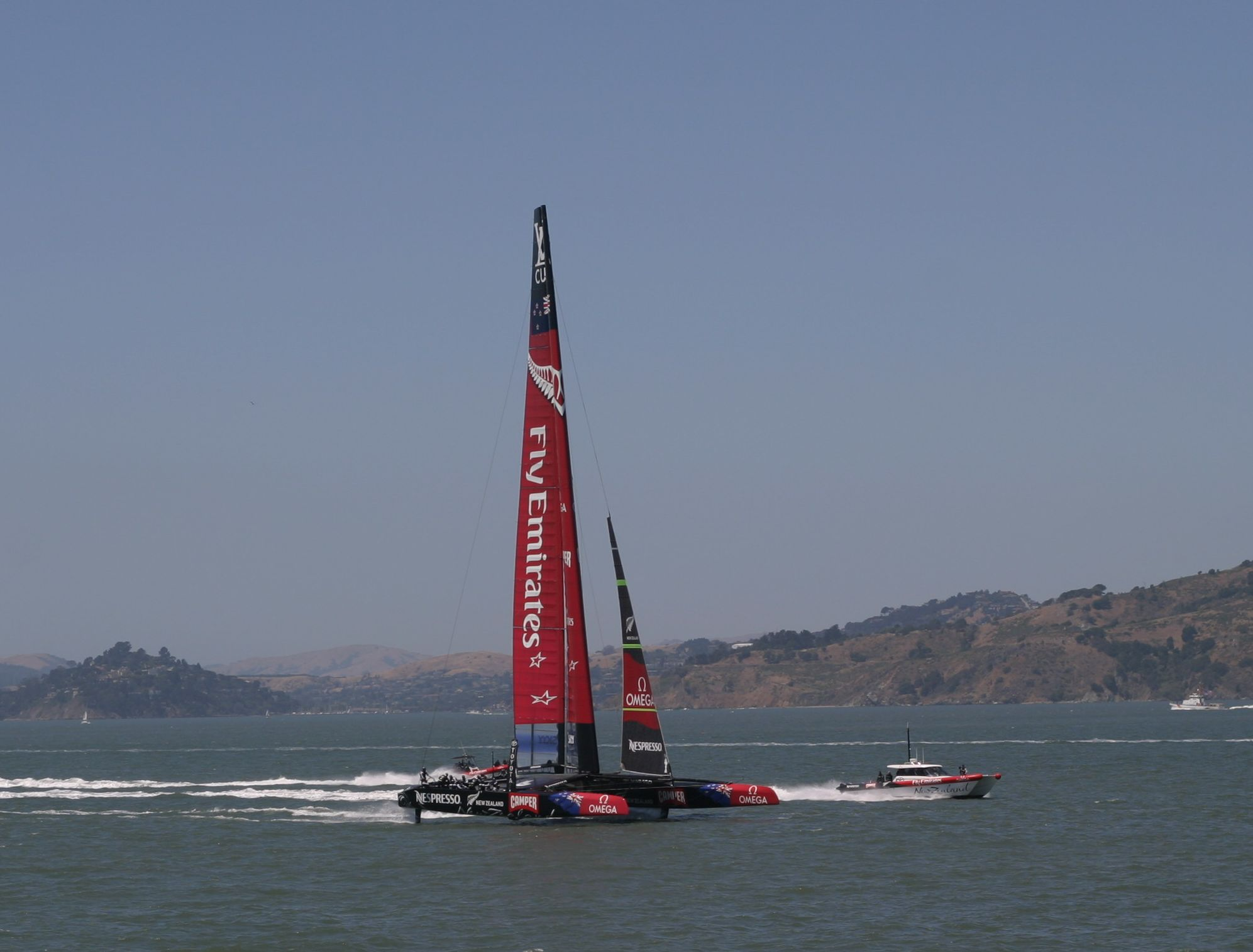
Emirates Team New Zealand's AC72 Aotearoa in San Francisco Bay

On 21 April 2011, Grant Dalton and Emirates Team New Zealand announced their entry for the 2013 America's Cup regatta to be held in San Francisco in 2013. New sponsor Nespresso came on board through parent company Nestlé. Grant Dalton expressed his gratitude to numerous corporate interests based around the world, namely Matteo De Nora and Stephen Tindall among others, in keeping the team afloat through the intervening years in what had been a difficult four years since the last multi-challenger event in Valencia 2007.

The team also received a NZ$36m grant from the New Zealand government to compete in the 2013 America's Cup and to promote and export New Zealand expertise in the field of yachting. This followed on from an economic impact assessment of the 2007 campaign in Valencia had shown a direct economic benefit to New Zealand of $74.4m.

Because of the high cost associated with developing the new AC72 catamaran and the rule limitation of thirty sailing days of development, Team New Zealand entered into a technology sharing programme with the Italian team who had an identical boat and were also based in Auckland. Since Team New Zealand's July 2012 launch, their first AC 72 boat proved fast and reliable, foil sailing for long periods of time at speeds over 35 knots (65 km/h; 40 mph) with no breakages.

In August 2013, Team New Zealand won the America's Cup challenger series (Louis Vuitton Cup) by defeating the Prada Luna Rossa Syndicate 7–1 and in September 2013 Team New Zealand challenged the Oracle syndicate for the America's Cup.

The race series was very dramatic, with a number of incidents including Oracle Team USA being docked two points (meaning they started the competition on −2 points) and having two main crew members banned – one for the competition, the other for 4 of the races. In Race 8, Team New Zealand nearly capsized the boat due to a lack of hydraulic pressure which caused the boat to move, but the sail to stay in the same place.

By 19 September 2013, Team New Zealand led Oracle Team USA 8–1 needing just one more win to take the Cup. In Race 13 Team New Zealand were minutes away from winning the cup when the race time limits came into effect, causing the race to be cancelled. The race was then replayed and Oracle Team USA won – and went on to win all last eight races to come from behind – and take the Cup. This win was facilitated by the American Syndicates ability Hydrofoil upwind. It had been the longest-ever event by both number of days and races, and the first since the 25th America's Cup to feature a winner-take-all final race.

Emirates Team New Zealand ruled out any post-racing legal challenge, with Grant Dalton stating that Oracle's automated stabilisation system had been checked and approved by the official measurers before the start of racing, and that taking legal action would be "an incredibly bad thing to do."

=== 35th America's Cup ===
In January 2014, Emirates Team New Zealand announced the signing of 2013 49er World and European Champions and 2012 Olympic Silver Medalists, Peter Burling and Blair Tuke. CEO Grant Dalton first said that the team would campaign two AC45's in future America's Cup World Series.

On 25 June 2014 Team New Zealand confirmed their intention to challenge, as they had gained sufficient private financial backing to need no further government assistance.

In the challenger series, Team New Zealand finished second in the round-robin stages behind America's Cup holders Oracle Team USA – the first time a Cup defender had participated in a challenger series. As the leading challenger, they chose to face Land Rover BAR in the first playoff round. Despite suffering a capsize in race 4, the outcome of the series was a 5–2 series victory for Team New Zealand. In the finals match against Artemis Racing, Team New Zealand secured a second 5–2 series win, and therefore progressed to the America's Cup series against Oracle Team USA.

Having won the challenger series, Oracle Team USA was able to impose a penalty point on the eventual challenger for the 35th America's Cup. Therefore, Team New Zealand started the 35th America's Cup racing with minus one point and would need to win eight races in order to get the 7 points needed to win the America's Cup. After five days of racing, which included nine races, Team New Zealand beat Oracle Team USA by eight races to one, or by 7 points to 1, and thereby won the Cup.

=== 36th America's Cup ===
The Prada Cup series was sailed from 15 January to 22 February 2021 to decide which Challenger should race Emirates Team New Zealand; Luna Rossa, New York Yacht Club American Magic or INEOS TEAM UK. It was a Round Robin format over 16 racing days. Ineos was the first to qualify, going into the Final of the Prada Cup undefeated. The American boat Patriot suffered hull damage and the onboard electronics were likely damaged due to water in the hull. After concerted efforts to get the boat ready again, with their competitors rallying to help, the boat met Luna Rossa in the Semi-Finals but it became obvious there were still problems onboard. The Italian team won every race to proceed into the Final to race against INEOS Team UK. Luna Rossa defeated Ineos 7 – 1 and faced Emirates Team New Zealand in the 36th America's Cup from 6 to 18 March 2021. Emirates Team New Zealand was successful in their defence of the cup, winning 7 – 3, retaining the Cup for the second time in a row.

The 36th America's Cup was the first edition to feature the AC75 class of foiling monohulls, first introduced in 2018 following Emirates Team New Zealand's victory in the 2017 America's Cup in Bermuda.

=== Louis Vuitton 37th America's Cup ===
Emirates Team New Zealand have successfully defended their title in Barcelona in 2024 after a 7-2 victory against the British team INEOS Britannia. This marked their fifth overall win and the third consecutive victory, making them the most successful team in the modern history of the America's Cup.

The journey to the Match wasn't without challenges though, as the team suffered a setback on 29 August, 2024 when their boat was dropped 7 meters from a crane in an unexplained craning accident. Following repairs overnight, the boat was back in the water two days later.

In the lead-up to the Louis Vuitton 37th America's Cup, three Preliminary Regattas were sailed, were the team won the events in Jeddah, Saudi Arabia in 2023, and the pre-event in Barcelona in August 2024. The Preliminary Regatta in Barcelona was sailed on the AC75s, while the others were contested in the AC40s.

=== Louis Vuitton 38th America's Cup ===
Emirates Team New Zealand are the Defender of the Louis Vuitton 38th America's Cup set to take place in 2027 in Naples. The America's Cup Match is scheduled to begin on 10 July 2027, with the Louis Vuitton Cup, the Challenger Selection Series, commencing on 22 May 2027.

The Protocol for the 38th America's Cup, together with the Technical Regulations and Class Rules, establishes the regulations governing the yachts used in the competition. Under these rules, all teams are required to reuse the hulls of the AC75 yachts sailed in the Louis Vuitton 37th America's Cup. Emirates Team New Zealand's winning yacht, Taihoro, has undergone modifications to comply with the updated regulations.

The team is based in Auckland, New Zealand, where it is currently conducting training and development activities ahead of the competition.

== Results ==
Year	Venue	Boat	Yachting club	Skipper	Competition	Result	Winner	Notes
1995	(United States) San Diego	Black Magic (IACC NZL-32)	Royal New Zealand Yacht Squadron	Russell Coutts	Louis Vuitton Cup	Winner		
1995	(United States) San Diego	Black Magic (IACC NZL-32)	Royal New Zealand Yacht Squadron	Russell Coutts	America's Cup (as challenger)	Winner		
2000	(New Zealand) Auckland	New Zealand (IACC NZL-60)	Royal New Zealand Yacht Squadron	Russell Coutts	America's Cup (as defender)	Winner		
2003	(New Zealand) Auckland	New Zealand (IACC NZL-82)	Royal New Zealand Yacht Squadron	Dean Barker	America's Cup (as defender)	Loser	(Switzerland) Alinghi	
2007	(Spain) Valencia	New Zealand (IACC NZL-82)	Royal New Zealand Yacht Squadron	Dean Barker	Louis Vuitton Cup	Winner		
2007	(Spain) Valencia	New Zealand (IACC NZL-82)	Royal New Zealand Yacht Squadron	Dean Barker	America's Cup (as challenger)	Loser	(Switzerland) Alinghi	
2013	(United States) San Francisco	Aotearoa (AC72)	Royal New Zealand Yacht Squadron	Dean Barker	Louis Vuitton Cup	Winner		
2013	(United States) San Francisco	Aotearoa (AC72)	Royal New Zealand Yacht Squadron	Dean Barker	America's Cup (as challenger)	Loser	(United States) Oracle Team USA	
2017	Bermuda	Aotearoa (AC50)	Royal New Zealand Yacht Squadron	Glenn Ashby	Louis Vuitton Challenger's Trophy	Winner		
2017	Bermuda	Aotearoa (AC50)	Royal New Zealand Yacht Squadron	Glenn Ashby	America's Cup (as challenger)	Winner		
2021	(New Zealand) Auckland	Te Rehutai (AC75)	Royal New Zealand Yacht Squadron	Peter Burling	America's Cup (as defender)	Winner		
2024	(Spain) Barcelona	Taihoro (AC75)	Royal New Zealand Yacht Squadron	Peter Burling	America's Cup (as defender)	Winner		
2027	(Italy) Naples	Taihoro (AC75)	Royal New Zealand Yacht Squadron	Nathan Outteridge	America's Cup (as defender)			

== Yachts used by Team New Zealand ==
- NZL 32 – "Black Magic I" International America's Cup Class. 1995 America's Cup winner
- NZL 38 – "Black Magic II" International America's Cup Class. 1995 Louis Vuitton Cup winner
- NZL 57 – "Black Magic III" International America's Cup Class. Training boat for 2000 defence
- NZL 60 – "Black Magic IV" International America's Cup Class. 2000 America's Cup winner
- NZL 68 – International America's Cup Class. Training boat bought from Illbruck Challenge (formerly GER 68)
- NZL 81 – International America's Cup Class. Training boat for 2003 defence
- NZL 82 – International America's Cup Class. America's Cup defender in 2003 but defeated 5–0. Used for Louis Vuitton Acts in preparation for the 2007 America's Cup and won the 2004 season
- NZL 84 – 2007 generation International America's Cup Class. Launched in 2006. Won 2006 Louis Vuitton Season
- NZL 92 – 2007 generation International America's Cup Class. Launched in October 2006. Won the 2007 Louis Vuitton Cup. Lost the America's Cup 2–5
- CAMPER – 2011 generation Volvo VO70 – Volvo Open 70. Launched in April 2011 for the 2011–2012 Volvo Ocean Race, which they finished in second position overall.
- Other boats related to the 2013 America's Cup campaign: two SL33 catamarans, one AC45 catamaran
- NZL 2 – "New Zealand" AC72. Training boat for 2013 campaign
- NZL 5 – "Aotearoa" AC72. Race boat for 2013 campaign. Won the 2013 Louis Vuitton Cup. Lost the 2013 America's Cup 8–9
- NZL – "RNZYS" AC50 "The cyclor boat" Race boat for 2017 campaign. Won the 2017 Louis Vuitton Cup. Won the 2017 America's Cup 7–1
- NZL – "Te Aihe" AC75. Training boat for 2021 campaign.
- NZL – "Te Rehutai" AC75. Foiling Race boat. 2021 America's Cup Winner
- NZL – "Te Kakahi" AC40. Training boat for 2024 campaign, also used for the 2024 Women’s and Youth America’s Cup
- NZL – "Taihoro" AC75. Foiling Race boat. 2024 America's Cup Winner, and competing yacht for the 38th America's Cup in Naples in 2027.

== Other achievements ==
- 2022: Together with sailor/pilot Glenn Ashby, Emirates Team New Zealand hold the World Land Yachting Speed Record of 222.43km/h (138.21mph). The record was achieved on 'Horonuku', the vessel Emirates Team New Zealand designed and built, on 11 December 2022 at Lake Gairdner, South Australia.
- 2025: Winner of "Team of the Year" Award by World Sailing.

== Popular culture ==
Team New Zealand and their achievements have been widely celebrated in New Zealand, including that of Sir Peter Blake.

- Sailing away was a number 1 hit in New Zealand in 1986 with a supergroup of kiwi artists showing support for team New Zealand
- Red Sock Day was inspired by Sir Peter Blakes iconic red socks which was said to bring him luck
- In 1987 Hammond Gamble released Jewel in the sea which peaked at 42 on the New Zealand top 50
- The documentary 'SAIL' follows Emirates Team New Zealand's and the challenging America's Cup teams' preparations and progress during the Louis Vuitton 37th America's Cup in Barcelona in 2024. The film is produced by Skydance Sports, Louis Vuitton, Kennedy/Marshall, IMAX, and Unreasonable Studios and premiered at the 2026 Venice Film Festival as part of the Giornate Degli Autori.

Awards
Preceded by Peter Burling & Blair Tuke	Halberg Awards – New Zealand Team of the Year; 2017	Succeeded by Black Ferns Sevens
Preceded by Lisa Carrington	Halberg Awards – Supreme Award; 2017	Succeeded by Tom Walsh
