= 2021 America's Cup =

Yacht race

36th America's Cup

Defender New Zealand
- Defender club: Royal New Zealand Yacht Squadron
- Yacht: Te Rehutai

Challenger Italy
- Challenger club: Circolo della Vela Sicilia
- Yacht: Luna Rossa

Competition
- Location: Auckland, New Zealand
- Dates: 10–17 March 2021
- Rule: AC75
- Winner: Royal New Zealand Yacht Squadron
- Score: (New Zealand) 7 (Italy) 3
- Website: ac36.americascup.com

The 2021 America's Cup in March 2021 was the 36th staging of the America's Cup yacht race. It was contested on the inner Hauraki Gulf off Auckland, New Zealand, between the Royal New Zealand Yacht Squadron and Circolo della Vela Sicilia of Italy. The Royal New Zealand Yacht Squadron's boat was Te Rehutai owned and sailed by the Emirates Team New Zealand syndicate. Circolo della Vela Sicilia's boat was Luna Rossa, owned and sailed by the Luna Rossa Prada Pirelli syndicate. Both boats are AC75 class high-performance foiling monohulls, a class designed specifically for this competition. The Cup was won by Team New Zealand, 7–3.

The Royal New Zealand Yacht Squadron was the Defending Club, having won the preceding 35th America's Cup in 2017, and was therefore responsible for organizing and hosting this event. The Challenging Club was Circolo della Vela Sicilia, whose team won the selection series – the 2021 Prada Cup – and was also the Challenger of Record, having been the first yacht club to make a valid challenge under the Deed of Gift of the America's Cup after Royal New Zealand Yacht Squadron won the 35th America's Cup.

The 36th America's Cup was raced under rules agreed between the Defending Club and the Challenging Club within the legal framework of the Deed of Gift of the America's Cup. In AC competition, the club whose boat is first to win seven races wins the cup and becomes the Defending Club, host, and organizer of the 37th America's Cup, after receiving a valid challenge from a yacht club from another country that meets the conditions of the deed.

== Background ==
The 35th edition of the America's cup was held between 17 and 26 June 2017. It was contested between the challenger, Emirates Team New Zealand, and the defender, Oracle Team USA. Team New Zealand won the cup match with a score of 7 to 1 over Oracle Team USA. The successful challenge made the Royal New Zealand Yacht Squadron the Defending club for the 36th America's cup.

The protocol for the 36th America's cup was released on 29 September 2017 with Auckland, New Zealand as the intended venue for the event. Grant Dalton, the CEO of Emirates Team New Zealand, confirmed that the fashion brand Prada had secured the right to be the exclusive naming and presenting sponsor of all events comprising the 36th America's Cup. This included the Challenger Selection Series which would officially be named The Prada Cup. This replaced the Louis Vuitton Cup that had been used as the Challenger Selection Series between 1983 and 2017.

The class rule for the AC75, the foiling monohulls that would be used for the event, was published on 29 March 2018.

The three person Arbitration Panel was appointed on 10 May 2018. The chairperson was David Tillett (AUS) who was joined by Henry Peter (SUI) and Graham McKenzie (NZL). All three are respected lawyers who have experience working with previous America's Cup adjudication bodies.

In August 2018, an "America's Cup Overture" was held in Cowes, England, 167 years after the original America's Cup race occurred at the same location. At the event, Auckland was confirmed as the venue for the cup match and challenger series with the event dates and courses also announced.

== Scheduling ==
The event was originally scheduled to start on 6 March 2021, but was delayed until 10 March due to a COVID-19 lockdown in Auckland. Iain Murray was the race director.

Entries for challengers opened on 1 January 2018 and closed on 30 June 2018 with late entries accepted until 30 November 2018. Heats for challengers and the defender, known as World Series, were held in 2020 in the brand new AC75 class. Challenger selection series was held in January and February 2021 with the America's Cup match against the defender in March.

Prior to Emirates Team New Zealand winning the 35th America's Cup in 2017, Oracle (the defender at the time) and four of the five challengers had signed a framework that would have seen the 36th America's Cup in 2019 and the 37th in 2021, with the existing 35th Cup class boats, the AC50s, and a pre-selection America's Cup World Series tournament with the same boats. Team New Zealand, the eventual champion, had opted to not sign the framework agreement, and were not bound by its terms, freeing them to set their defence for 2021 with a brand new format and class.

== Challengers ==
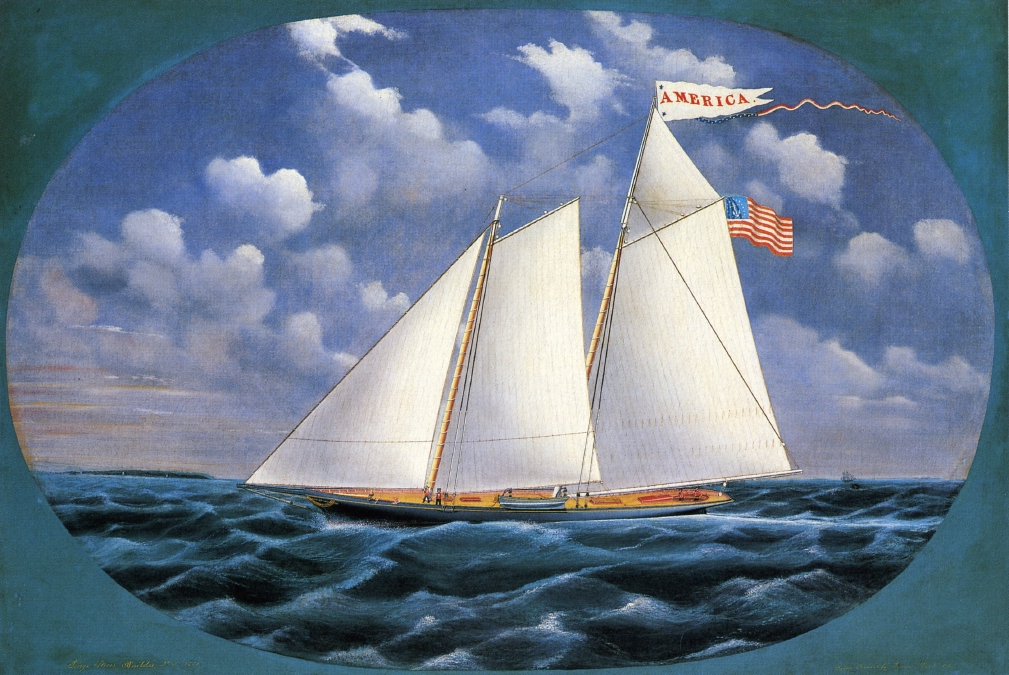
America 1851, by James Bard

Circolo della Vela Sicilia was the "Challenger of Record" for the 36th America's Cup. Their team, Luna Rossa Prada Pirelli, currently led by Max Sirena, had previously lost to Emirates Team New Zealand in the 2000 America's Cup, the 2007, and the 2013 Louis Vuitton Cup finals. On 13 March 2018, Jimmy Spithill announced he was returning to the team, after his tenure as helmsman in the 2007 America's Cup.

The Royal New Zealand Yacht Squadron began accepting challenges from further eligible yacht clubs, in addition to the Challenger of Record, on 1 January 2018.

Ineos Team UK entered and was led by Ben Ainslie.

The New York Yacht Club (NYYC) entered AC36, under the syndicate name American Magic, with a team led by Terry Hutchinson and funded by Doug DeVos, John J. "Hap" Fauth, and Roger Penske. In May 2018 it was announced that Dean Barker would helm the boat. "American Magic" refers to the first Cup winner, the yacht America of 1851, and the first defender, NYYC's yacht Magic, who successfully defended in 1870. The America's Cup trophy was held by the NYYC for 132 years until 1983. The NYYC's reign was the longest winning streak – as measured by years – in the history of all sports.

At the close of the late entry notice period, 30 November 2018, eight notices of challenge were submitted to the defender. There was speculation about entries from Australia and China, and second challengers from Italy and the United States. After processing those entries by order of reception, by the end of year 2018 three additional challenges were accepted: Iain Percy and the Royal Malta Yacht Club; a second American challenge from Taylor Canfield and the Long Beach Yacht Club; and a national challenge from the Netherlands issued by Royal Dutch Yacht Club.

On 2 April 2019, the New York Yacht Club, through team American Magic, filed for arbitration relating to the acceptance of the three late entry teams. On 15 May 2019, the America's Cup Arbitration Panel released their decision denying American Magic's application and allowed the late entry teams to compete.

On 31 May 2019, the Royal Malta Yacht Club announced that they were withdrawing as a challenger.

On 1 July 2019, the Koninklijke Nederlandsche Zeil- & Roeivereeniging announced that it was also withdrawing as a challenger, whereas the Long Beach Yacht Club confirmed their ongoing commitment.

On 9 December 2020, Stars & Stripes (Long Beach Yacht Club) withdrew from the competition.

Starting 29 January 2021, Luna Rossa faced the New York Yacht Club in a best-of-7 semi-final for the challenger's Prada Cup; by 30 January, the Italians had completed a 4–0 sweep to advance to the Prada Cup finals. In the best-of-13 finals, Luna Rosa needed only 8 races, ending on 21 February, to defeat the INEOS Team 7–1, advancing from the challenger's pool.

Team	Yacht Club	Skipper
~~Malta Atlus Challenge~~	~~Royal Malta Yacht Club~~	~~(United Kingdom) Iain Percy~~
(Netherlands) ~~Dutch Sail~~	~~Koninklijke Nederlandse Zeil- en Roeivereniging~~	~~(Netherlands) Simeon Tienpont~~
(United States) ~~Stars & Stripes~~	~~Long Beach Yacht Club, California~~	~~(United States) Taylor Canfield~~
(Italy) Luna Rossa Prada Pirelli	Circolo della Vela Sicilia	(Italy) Max Sirena
(United States) American Magic	New York Yacht Club	(United States) Terry Hutchinson
(United Kingdom) Ineos Team UK	Royal Yacht Squadron	(United Kingdom) Sir Ben Ainslie

== Venue ==
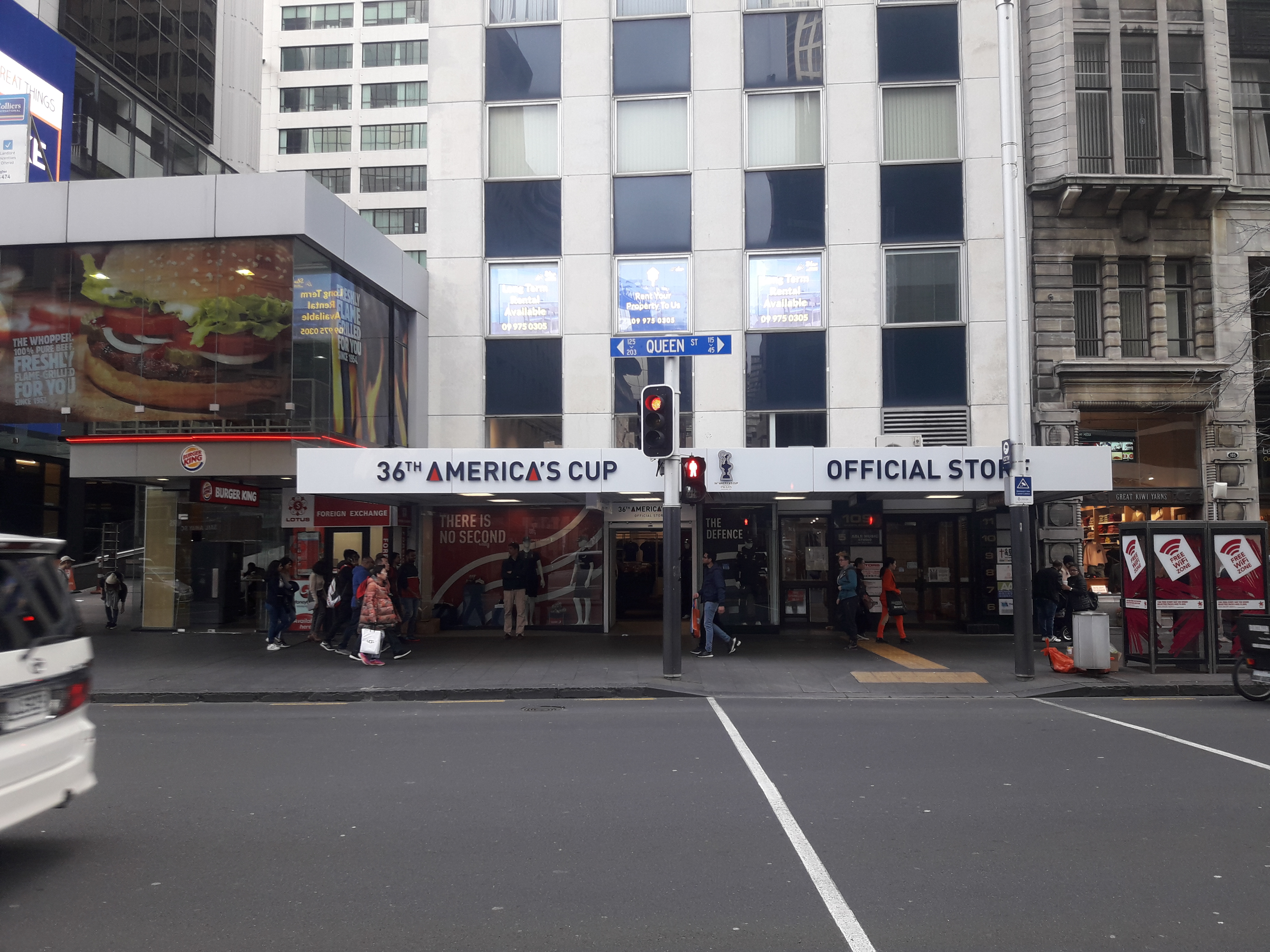
An official 36th America's Cup souvenir shop in Auckland CBD, New Zealand

The Cup was sailed in New Zealand's Hauraki Gulf, on the east coast of the North Island, outside of Auckland City's Waitematā Harbour as the venue. Italy was announced as the backup venue.

Auckland had also previously been the venue for the America's Cup in 2000 and 2003.

Infrastructure work was undertaken in Auckland's Wynyard Quarter to prepare for the event. This included dredging of the Outer Viaduct Harbour, installation of new floating infrastructure such as pontoons, and construction of team bases.

Five race courses were used, lettered A through to E. Every racing day the race management made a decision on which course would be used.

During the Prada Cup, the Auckland Sky Tower was illuminated in red alongside the event logo projected with a variety of animations. The show occurred on the hour and half-hour between 9 pm and 2 am on race days.

== Boats ==
The America's Cup races have been contested using many historical classes in the past. For the 2021 series Team ENTZ developed a new class of 75-foot (23-meter) foiling monohulls named the America's Cup 75 or AC75. The boats were required to be "constructed in country". Teams were allowed to build two boats each.

The winning yacht of ETNZ is named Te Rehutai, which means 'spirit of the ocean'.

== Nationality ==
Twenty percent of sailors in each team were required to have passports from that country. The rest must meet a residency requirement: they must reside in that team's country for 380 days from 1 September 2018 to 1 September 2020.

== Qualifying event ==
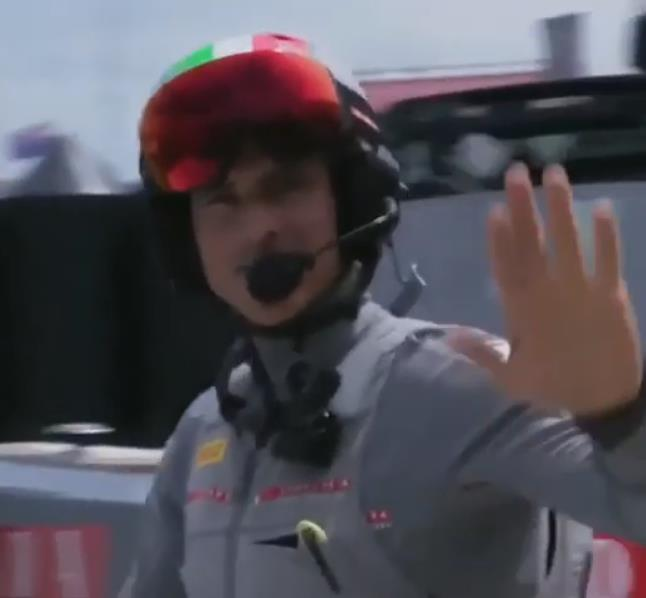
Francesco Bruni, the helmsman of Luna Rossa.

The first two of the three planned 2020 America's Cup World Series competitions – in Sardinia and Portsmouth – were cancelled due to the impact of the COVID-19 pandemic on sports. The third event, held over three days in December 2020, was won by Emirates Team New Zealand. A subsequent "Christmas Race" was abandoned due to low wind. None were used as a qualification competition.

The cancellations of the earlier regattas meant that the third world series event was the first time that the AC75 class had been sailed in competition anywhere, including by the competitors themselves, before the qualifying series. The successful control of the COVID-19 pandemic in New Zealand meant that local activities were able to continue according to schedule and with minimal disruption – including the fact of spectators being allowed to gather in groups to view the event in-person, something which had been forbidden at nearly all major sporting events around the world during 2020.

The 2021 Prada Cup was held in Auckland between 15 January and 21 February 2021. It was the competition to determine the official challenger. It started with a quadruple Round-robin tournament, to determine a seeding, which Ineos Team UK won undefeated. The round-robin was notable for the capsize of American Magic in its fourth match and subsequent forfeiture of the rest of the round-robin races while the team effected major repairs. Luna Rossa Prada Pirelli (2nd in the round-robin) went on to beat American Magic 4–0 in a semi-final series to advance to the final. Luna Rossa then won the final series against Ineos UK by 7–1 – thereby becoming the official challenger for the America's Cup against defender Emirates Team New Zealand. Detection of COVID-19 cases in Auckland led to an increase in alert level by the New Zealand Government that caused disruption to the racing and spectator access during the latter stages of the final series.

Semifinal			Final
			1	(United Kingdom) Ineos Team UK	1
2	(Italy) Luna Rossa Prada Pirelli	4	2	(Italy) Luna Rossa Prada Pirelli	7
3	(United States) American Magic	0

== Cup match ==
The America's Cup was a best of 13 race series. Races were originally to be held from 6–15 March 2021, with two races per day on 6–7 March, 10 March, and 12–15 March, with additional "reserve days" available if poor weather necessitates a delay. On 28 February, the New Zealand Government announced that Auckland would move into lockdown for at least 7 days due to a resurgence of COVID-19. This caused the postponement of race days 1 and 2 (originally scheduled to be held on 6–7 March). On 5 March, the revised schedule was released, with racing starting on 10 March and ending 17 March.

Races won
Team / Race number	1	2	3	4	5	6	7	8	9	10	Total
Emirates Team New Zealand	●			●		●	●	●	●	●	7
(Italy) Luna Rossa Prada Pirelli		●	●		●						3

Race	Date	Time	Port Entry	Starboard Entry	Time	Course	Legs	Start	Gate 1	Gate 2	Gate 3	Gate 4	Gate 5	Finish
1	10 March	23' 08"	Emirates Team New Zealand	(Italy) Luna Rossa Prada Pirelli	+0' 31" (+591 m)	E	6	(New Zealand) −0' 00"	(New Zealand) −0' 14"	(New Zealand) −0' 23"	(New Zealand) −0' 19"	(New Zealand) −0' 17"	(New Zealand) −0' 20"	(New Zealand) −0' 31"
2	10 March	24' 41"	(Italy) Luna Rossa Prada Pirelli	Emirates Team New Zealand	+0' 07" (+139 m)	E	6	(Italy) −0' 01"	(Italy) −0' 13"	(Italy) −0' 12"	(Italy) −0' 25"	(Italy) −0' 24"	(Italy) −0' 12"	(Italy) −0' 07"
3	12 March	27' 18"	(Italy) Luna Rossa Prada Pirelli	Emirates Team New Zealand	+0' 37" (+438 m)	E	6	(New Zealand) −0' 00"	(Italy) −0' 10"	(Italy) −0' 13"	(Italy) −0' 27"	(Italy) −0' 22"	(Italy) −0' 38"	(Italy) −0' 37"
4	12 March	29' 53"	Emirates Team New Zealand	(Italy) Luna Rossa Prada Pirelli	+1' 03" (+676 m)	E	6	(New Zealand) −0' 00"	(New Zealand) −0' 09"	(New Zealand) −0' 34"	(New Zealand) −0' 34"	(New Zealand) −0' 48"	(New Zealand) −0' 58"	(New Zealand) −1' 03"
5	13 March	+0' 18" (+197m)	Emirates Team New Zealand	(Italy) Luna Rossa Prada Pirelli	29' 04"	A	6	(Italy) −0' 12"	(Italy) −0' 32"	(Italy) −0' 32"	(Italy) −0' 22"	(Italy) −0' 27"	(Italy) −0' 23"	(Italy) −0' 18"
6	13 March	+ 1' 41" (+1,405m)	(Italy) Luna Rossa Prada Pirelli	Emirates Team New Zealand	27' 26"	A	6	(New Zealand) −0' 14"	(New Zealand) −0' 51"	(New Zealand) −1' 07"	(New Zealand) −1' 05"	(New Zealand) −1' 13"	(New Zealand) −1' 22"	(New Zealand) −1' 41"
7	~~14 March~~; 15 March	+0' 58" (+829 m)	(Italy) Luna Rossa Prada Pirelli	Emirates Team New Zealand	25' 17"	E	6	(New Zealand) −0' 00"	(Italy) −0' 08"	(Italy) −0' 10"	(New Zealand) −0’ 19"	(New Zealand) −0' 29"	(New Zealand) −0' 48"	(New Zealand) −0' 58"
8	~~14 March~~; 15 March	38' 57"	Emirates Team New Zealand	(Italy) Luna Rossa Prada Pirelli	+3' 55" (+1,793 m)	E	5	(New Zealand) −0' 00"	(Italy) −0' 16"	(Italy) −4' 08"	(Italy) −4’ 27"	(New Zealand) −4' 06"	~	(New Zealand) −3' 55"
9	16 March	25' 29"	Emirates Team New Zealand	(Italy) Luna Rossa Prada Pirelli	+0' 30" (+483 m)	C	6	(New Zealand) −0' 00"	(Italy) −0' 01"	(Italy) −0' 08"	(Italy) −0’ 09"	(Italy) −0' 03"	(New Zealand) −0' 18"	(New Zealand) −0' 30"
10	16 March	Postponed				~								
10	17 March	+0' 46" (+630 m)	(Italy) Luna Rossa Prada Pirelli	Emirates Team New Zealand	26' 08"	AB	6	(Italy) −0' 00"	(New Zealand) −0' 07"	(New Zealand) −0' 09"	(New Zealand) −0' 27"	(New Zealand) −0' 37"	(New Zealand) −0' 49"	(New Zealand) −0' 46"

Notes:

- Race day 4 (races 7 and 8) were postponed on 14 March due to light winds and were scheduled to be run on 15 March. All further race days were pushed an extra day to accommodate.
- Race 8 was shortened mid-race from 6 legs to 5 legs due to wind conditions.
- Due to poor wind conditions at the start of race day 5 (16 March), only one race was able to be run before the end of the day– race 9. The 10th race therefore became the first race to be sailed on the 6th day of the competition.

Team New Zealand retained the America's Cup trophy that they had won in 2017, winning the best of 13 series by 7 races to 3. The Italian team won three of the first five races, but New Zealand won five straight to keep the title. This was their fourth victory, following earlier wins in 1995 and 2000. The turning point came in the eighth race, where New Zealand clawed back a four-minute deficit to win and take a 5–3 lead, just as their opponents looked to be drawing level in the series. The Prime Minister of New Zealand, Jacinda Ardern, commented that "Team New Zealand has once again made us all so proud by retaining the America's Cup...we want to see it all over again in 2023".

== Broadcasting ==
- Australia: Fox Sports
- Italy: RAI and Sky Italia
- Malaysia: Astro
- New Zealand: TVNZ
- South Korea: SBS Korea
- United Kingdom: BBC and Sky Sports UK and Ireland
- United States: NBC Sports Network
- Hungary: M4Sport
- France: Canal Plus
- Germany: ServusTV
- Canada: TSN
- Portugal: RTP2
- Latin America: ESPN Extra

The event was also streamed live on YouTube, Facebook and its own website.

In 2018, TVNZ secured the exclusive New Zealand broadcast rights for the cup and it's preliminary events. This meant that all racing would be broadcast live on free-to-air TV and live streamed on TVNZ OnDemand. Grant Dalton, the CEO of Team New Zealand, said that "It has been a fundamental principle of Emirates Team New Zealand and the Challenger of Record that the America's Cup be accessible to as many Kiwis as possible since we won the trophy back almost one year ago. TVNZ have committed to provide coverage of this America's Cup like no other, so we are delighted that the America's Cup Match Presented by Prada and all preceding events will be broadcast live and free to air for all New Zealanders to watch and be part of."

== See also ==
- 2021 Prada Cup
- Italy at the America's Cup
