= NZL 82 =

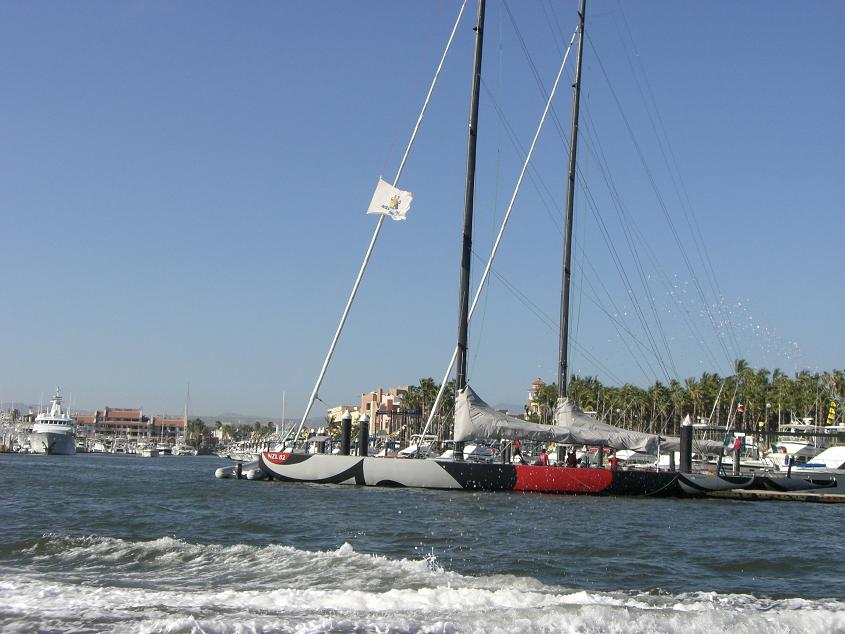
- NZL 82 (behind) and NZL 81 docked in harbor
- Yacht club: Royal New Zealand Yacht Squadron
- Nation: New Zealand
- Class: International America's Cup Class
- Sail no: NZL–82
- Designer(s): Tom Schnackenberg, Clay Oliver & Mike Drumond
- Builder: Cookson Boatbuilders; Auckland, New Zealand
- Launched: 2002
- Owner(s): Team New Zealand

Racing career
- Skippers: Dean Barker
- Notable victories: 2004 Louis Vuitton Acts
- America's Cup: 2003

Specifications
- Displacement: 27.550 t (27.115 long tons; 30.369 short tons)
- Length: 24.07 m (79.0 ft) (LOA); 18.28 m (60.0 ft) (LWL)
- Beam: 4.11 m (13.5 ft)
- Draft: 3.96 m (13.0 ft)
- Mast height: 33.50 m (109.9 ft)
- Sail area: 306 m^{2} (3,290 sq ft)

NZL 82 was a 2003-generation International America's Cup Class racing yacht. Raced by defenders Team New Zealand in the 2003 America's Cup match, she was defeated 5–0 by challenger Alinghi (SUI 64).

== Design ==
After the successful 2000 defence in Auckland, many senior Team New Zealand members were lured to richer syndicates and their challenges for the 2003 America's Cup. Most notable among these departures were those of Russell Coutts and Brad Butterworth to Swiss challengers Alinghi. These departures resulted in a lack of senior leadership at Team New Zealand, which along with a relative lack of funds, caused the team to resort to radical design innovations in an attempt to defend the cup with raw boat speed alone.

NZL 82 was notable for her design innovations. The most controversial of these was the so-called "HULA" (Hull Appendage) – a flat appendage attached to the afterbody of the hull designed to increase waterline length (and therefore speed) without increasing the overall length of the boat. Another radical innovation was the keel bulb, which at approximately 7 metres (23 ft) in length, was over 2 metres (6 ft 7 in) longer than its competitors of the time.

== Career ==
=== America's Cup ===
NZL 82 was used in Team New Zealand's 2003 America's Cup defence. She was completely ineffective, losing 0–5 to challenger Alinghi. The defeat was largely due to NZL 82's lack of reliability.

The first race was sailed in a stiff breeze and choppy seas. NZL 82 retired due to multiple gear failures in the rigging and the low cockpit unexpectedly taking onboard large quantities of water. The end of the boom snapped off due to increased stress caused by the weight of water in the boat. In addition the headsail pulled out of the groove in the forestay foil, damaging it and preventing a new sail from being hoisted.

Race 4 was sailed in strong winds and rough seas and NZL 82's mast snapped on the third leg causing retirement. On the third leg in race 5, NZL 82 broke a spinnaker pole.

Alinghi's SUI 64 proved to be quicker and more reliable.

=== 2004–06 Louis Vuitton Acts ===
NZL 82 was subsequently refined and competed in the Louis Vuitton Acts which were used as the build-up to the 2007 America's Cup. NZL 82 won the 2004 Louis Vuitton Season.

=== 2007–08 use ===
NZL 82 along with NZL 81 are both currently in Cabo San Lucas, Mexico. The boats, now owned and operated by Cabo Adventures, are set up so that the public has the opportunity to race the yachts off the Gulf of California / Pacific Ocean areas near Cabo San Lucas.

Both yachts have had engines installed for commercial use. Heavier duty sails have also been purchased and installed which will last much longer than the lighter, racing sails used in America's Cup racing.
