= AC72 =

Class of racing catamaran yacht that was developed for the 2013 America's Cup

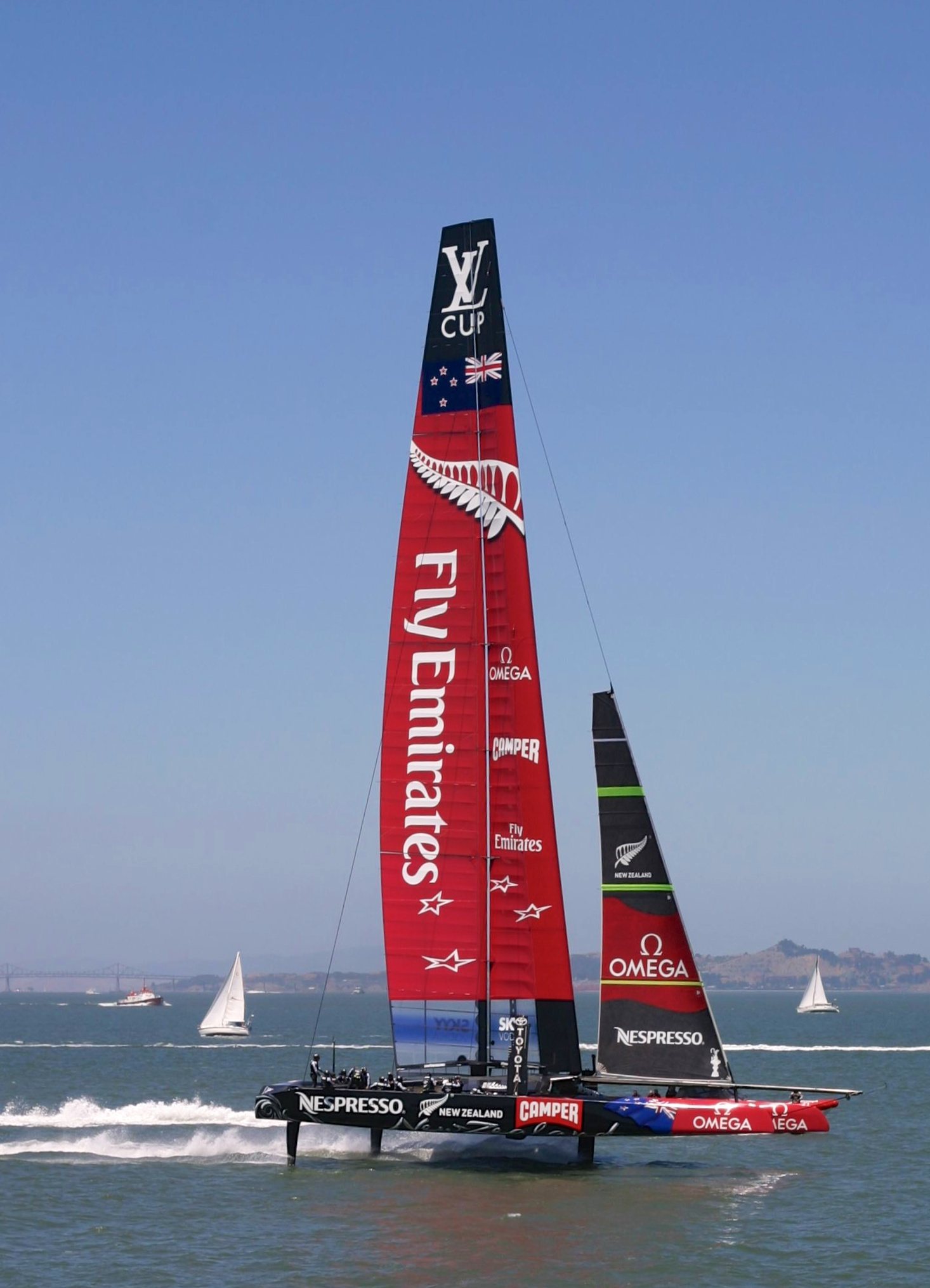
- Team New Zealand AC72, San Francisco Bay

Development
- Design: Box rule

Boat
- Crew: 11
- Draft: 4.4 m (14 ft)

Hull
- Type: Catamaran
- Hull weight: 5,900 kg (13,000 lb)
- LOA: 26.2 m (86 ft)
- LWL: 22.0 m (72.2 ft)
- Beam: 14.0 m (45.9 ft)

Rig
- Mast height: 40.0 m (131.2 ft)

Sails
- Mainsail area: 260 m^{2} (2,800 sq ft) (wing estimate)
- Upwind sail area: 580 m^{2} (6,200 sq ft) (wing and gennaker estimate)

The AC72 (America's Cup 72 class) is a class of catamarans with wingsails and hydrofoils, built to a box rule for yachts competing in the 2013 Louis Vuitton and the America's Cup races. The class was subsequently replaced by the smaller AC50 class.

== Background ==
Following the 2010 America's Cup, where the Golden Gate Yacht Club's USA 17 trimaran defeated the catamaran Alinghi 5, it was decided by the winners that the next America's Cup competition would be sailed in catamarans in the hope of making the sport more attractive to television audiences. At the same time a smaller sister class, the AC45, was developed to allow teams to practice and adjust to the new formula as well as create a greater exposure of sailing to the general public with the America's Cup World Series.

== Specifications ==
The AC72 has the following maximum specifications:

- Overall length: 26.2 metres (86 ft)
- Waterline length: 22.0 metres (72.2 ft)
- Beam: 14.0 metres (45.9 ft)
- Weight: 5,900 kilograms (13,000 lb)
- Maximum draught: 4.4 metres (14 ft)
- Crew: 11

Maximum speed

Using foils for the first time in the America's Cup, the AC72 was expected to sail faster than the wind: upwind at 1.2 times the speed of the true wind, and downwind at 1.6 times the speed of the true wind. In fact it proved even faster, averaging about 1.8 times the speed of the wind with peaks slightly over 2.3. A multiple of 2.79 times wind speed was achieved by Emirates Team New Zealand in practice, as they sailed at 44.15 knots (81 km/h, 50 mph) in 15.8 knots of wind on July 18, 2013.

Typical racing speeds are over 30 knots (55 km/h, 34 mph) with the boats capable of attaining well over 40 knots (74 km/h, 46 mph) in the right conditions. The fastest race speed recorded was 47.57 knots (88 km/h, 55 mph) in 21.8 knots of wind (2.2 times the wind speed) on September 24, 2013, by Emirates Team New Zealand.

Features

- Pedestals
- Multi speed winches
- Backstays
- Crossbeams
- Wing Pod
- Digital Performance Indicators
- Soft Sails
- Wing-controlled cables
- Three separate cockpits
- Buttons on wheels

== In competition ==
The boats have been used in the 2013 Louis Vuitton Cup and the 2013 America's Cup. By mid-June 2013, all boats had "lined up" and conducted trials against each other on the planned race track in San Francisco Bay, notably Oracle Team USA vs. Artemis Racing and Emirates Team New Zealand vs. Luna Rossa Challenge.

== List of AC72 catamarans ==
AC72 catamarans
Syndicate	Name	Shipyard	Launched	Competitive history	Subsequent history
Emirates Team New Zealand	New Zealand	Cookson Boats	21 July 2012	Trial boat	Decommissioned
(United States) Oracle Team USA	17	Oracle Racing	30 August 2012	Trial boat. Extensively damaged in a 16 October 2012 capsize. Relaunched 4 February 2013.	
(Italy) Luna Rossa	Luna Rossa	Persico Marine	26 October 2012	Raced in the 2013 Louis Vuitton Cup	On exhibit at the Museo Nazionale Scienza e Tecnologia Leonardo da Vinci
(Sweden) Artemis Racing	Big Red	King Marine	3 November 2012	Trial boat	Deemed a "complete loss" after capsize on 9 May 2013
Emirates Team New Zealand	New Zealand Aotearoa	Cookson Boats	3 February 2013	Winner of the 2013 Louis Vuitton Cup; Lost the 2013 America's Cup to Oracle Team USA (9–8)	
(United States) Oracle Team USA	Oracle Team USA 17	Oracle Racing	23 April 2013	Winner of the 2013 America's Cup	On exhibit at the Mariners' Museum in Virginia.
(Sweden) Artemis Racing	Big Blue	King Marine	22 July 2013	Raced in the 2013 Louis Vuitton Cup	

== Incidents ==
On 17 October 2012, Oracle Racing's AC72 pitchpoled (somersaulted) and capsized, causing severe damage to the yacht. The wingsail was completely destroyed while being swept under the Golden Gate Bridge by a strong ebb tide.

On 9 May 2013, Artemis Racing's AC72 pitchpoled and broke apart, resulting in the death of crew member Andrew Simpson.

The other two teams, Luna Rossa Challenge, and Team New Zealand, both suffered minor setbacks, including hitting seals and damaging their wing sails, resulting in loss of sailing time.

== See also ==
- List of multihulls
