= Long Beach Race Week =

Long Beach Race Week (LBRW) is an annual sailing regatta for keelboats and ocean racing catamarans conducted annually at the end of June. Organized by Alamitos Bay Yacht Club and Long Beach Yacht Club it is organized on multiple courses in the ocean off Long Beach, California, United States. It is the final leg of the major Southern California regattas which are Ahmanson Cup (Newport Harbor YC), Yachting Cup (SDYC) and Cal Race Week (California YC). With the end of Golison Race Week (a.k.a. Sobstad/Audi/Coast Cadillac/North Sails Race Week) after a 20-year run, Long Beach Race Week has taken the role of the preeminent regatta in Southern California at which the racers hope for the big breeze to roll down from Hurricane Gulch.
