= Taihoro =

America's Cup yacht

Taihoro is an AC75 foiling monohull racing yacht that successfully defended the America’s Cup for the Royal New Zealand Yacht Squadron (RNZYS) from 12-19 October 2024 in the 37th America’s Cup match in Barcelona, Spain. It defeated Britannia III representing the UK’s Royal Yacht Squadron 7-2.

Taihoro is owned and sailed on behalf of the RNZYS by the Emirates Team New Zealand sailing syndicate, led by Grant Dalton. It was named and blessed by Ngati Whatua Orakei and launched by former New Zealand Prime Minister Helen Clark in Auckland, New Zealand, on 18 April 2024. Taihoro is a verb in the Maori language meaning “to move swiftly as the sea between both sky and earth” in English.

Ahead of defending the America’s Cup, Taihoro won both the Louis Vuitton America’s Cup preliminary regatta, held in Barcelona through 22-25 August 2024, and the double round robin of the Louis Vuitton Cup challenger series held in Barcelona from 29 August to 8 September 2024. This was the first time a defender yacht was allowed to participate in part of an America’s Cup challenger series, although points from the races involving the defender were not counted in terms of which four challengers would progress to the semifinals of the Louis Vuitton Cup.

After the first day’s racing in the Louis Vuitton Cup in August 2024, in which Taihoro beat Luna Rossa Prada Pirelli, the crane lifting it out of the water malfunctioned, dropping it approximately 7m, damaging its hull. While Taihoro could not be sailed in the day-two races, Emirates Team New Zealand’s shore team worked around the clock so that it was able to race again on day three.
