= Curtis Blewett =

Canadian sailor

Curtis Blewett is a Canadian sailor who has sailed in multiple Volvo Ocean Races and America's Cups.

Blewett sailed with Paul Cayard when he won the 1997–98 Whitbread Round the World Race on EF Language. He then joined Cayard's campaign on AmericaOne at the 2000 Louis Vuitton Cup.

Blewett then joined Alinghi and sailed with them when they won the 2003 Louis Vuitton Cup and 2003 America's Cup.

He then sailed on Pirates of the Caribbean, skippered by Cayard, during the 2005–06 Volvo Ocean Race before re-joining Alinghi for their successful 2007 America's Cup defence. He was on Alinghi 5 when it lost the 2010 America's Cup.

For the 2011–13 America's Cup World Series and 2013 Louis Vuitton Cup, Blewett sailed with Artemis Racing.
