= Peter Montgomery (broadcaster) =

New Zealand sports broadcaster

Peter Montgomery MBE
- Born: 1943 (age 82–83); Kaitaia, New Zealand
- Education: King's High School
- Occupation: Broadcaster
- Children: 2

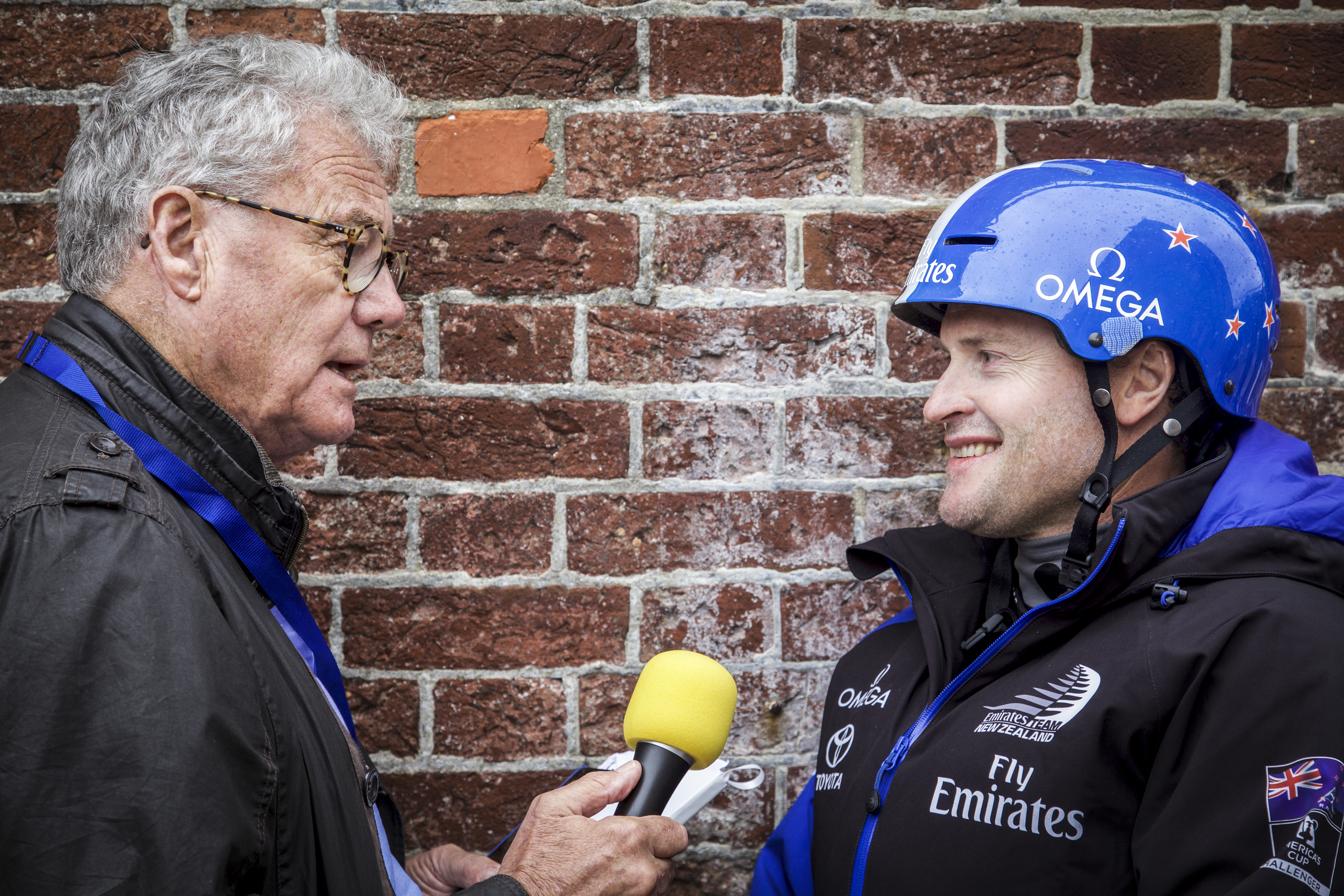
Emirates Team New Zealand skipper Glenn Ashby does an interview with Peter "PJ" Montgomery after racing on Race Day 2 at Louis Vuitton America's Cup World Series Portsmouth 2016

Peter John "PJ" Montgomery MBE is a New Zealand sports broadcaster. His work has covered many sports, but he is best known as "The Voice of the America's Cup" on New Zealand and international radio and television. He is often remembered for "The America's Cup is now New Zealand's Cup", his summary when New Zealand won their first America's Cup in San Diego in 1995. The line was voted the most memorable sporting commentary moment in history by the Sunday Star Times.

== Early life ==
Montgomery was born in Kaitaia, Northland but moved with his family to Dunedin at a young age, where he attended King's High School. He was an Otago junior representative at both sprinting and rugby union. After moving to Auckland in 1965, he became interested in yachting, and started sailing on various keel boats before gaining regular crew spots.

== Broadcasting career ==
Montgomery has broadcast thirteen America's Cup regattas, ten Olympic Games and all thirteen Whitbread Round the World/Volvo Ocean Races. He has been regularly invited to commentate at major regattas across the world, including World Championships and key regattas on the World Match Racing Tour, including The Bermuda Gold Cup, The Swedish Match Cup and The Monsoon Cup Malaysia. World Sailing also chose him to be the first Host / MC for the World Sailor of The Year and Sailing Hall of Fame ceremonies.

In addition to commentating and reporting on sailing regattas he has also broadcast many other sports including rowing and rugby. He was the "sideline eye" for the Radio Network "Radio Rugby Team" in Auckland for over twenty years, where his Driz-a-Bone raincoat had become as recognised on the sideline as his microphone.

He was chosen to play the America's Cup broadcaster in the 1992 movie Wind to lend authenticity to the racing scenes and is featured in the America's Cup documentary film The Wind Gods.

== Awards and membership ==
- New Zealand Sports Journalist of the Year
- New Zealand Sports Broadcaster of the Year
- Communicator of the Year
- Yachtsman of the Year – 1990, when the New Zealand Yachting Federation awarded their highest honour – The Bernard Ferguson Trophy
- Appointed a Member of the Order of the British Empire, for services to sports broadcasting, in the 1995 Queen's Birthday Honours
- The SPARC "Lifetime Contribution to Journalism through Sport" at the 2003 New Zealand Sports Journalists Association awards
- America's Cup Hall of Fame Class of 2021 Inductee

Montgomery is a Patron or Vice Patron of several yacht clubs, a member of the selection committees for The America's Cup Hall of Fame and The Yachting New Zealand Sailor of the Year Award. He is a Life Member of the Royal New Zealand Yacht Squadron, Yachting New Zealand, The Royal Bermuda Yacht Club and The New Zealand Sports Journalists Association.

== See also ==
- List of New Zealand television personalities
