= 2013 Louis Vuitton Cup =

Boat race

8th Louis Vuitton Cup
Event information
- Type: challenge race for America's Cup
- Dates: July 4 – September 1, 2013
- Host city: San Francisco, California, United States of America
- Boats: Artemis Racing (Sweden); Emirates Team New Zealand; Luna Rossa Challenge (Italy)
- Distance: seven-leg course
- Website: www.americascup.com

Results
- Winner: Emirates Team New Zealand

Succession
- Previous: 2007 Louis Vuitton Cup
- Next: 2017 Louis Vuitton Challenger's Trophy

The 8th Louis Vuitton Cup was held during July and August 2013, in San Francisco, California, United States of America. The three contenders were Artemis Racing (Sweden), Emirates Team New Zealand (New Zealand), and Luna Rossa Challenge (Italy). After a preliminary round robin to determine seeding, Artemis Racing was eliminated in the semi-final round by Luna Rossa Challenge by four races to none. In the final, Emirates Team New Zealand beat Luna Rossa Challenge by seven races to one, and went on to challenge Oracle Team USA for the 2013 America's Cup.

== The teams ==
Twelve yacht clubs applied to challenge the America's Cup before the deadline, though their names were not originally disclosed. They included:

- (Italy) Club Nautico di Roma (the original challenger of record, withdrew)
- (Sweden) Kungliga Svenska Segelsällskapet
- (Italy) Circolo della Vela Sicilia
- Royal New Zealand Yacht Squadron
- (France) Aleph Yacht Club (withdrew)
- Yacht Club de France (withdrew)
- (China) Měi Fán Yacht Club
- (Spain) Real Club Náutico de Valencia
- (Italy) Club Canottieri Roggero di Lauria (failed eligibility)
- (South Korea) Sail Korea Yacht Club

On August 2, 2012, the America's Cup Event Authority announced that, following withdrawals or failure to meet the eligibility criteria, only four challenging teams would compete: Kungliga Svenska Segelsällskapet's Artemis Racing, Royal New Zealand Yacht Squadron's Team New Zealand, Circolo della Vela Sicilia's Luna Rossa Challenge and Sail Korea Yacht Club's Team Korea

In March, 2013, Team Korea withdrew, leaving three challengers. Shown in the order in which they applied, they were:

Club	Team	Skipper	Reference
(Sweden) Kungliga Svenska Segelsällskapet	Artemis Racing	(United Kingdom) Iain Percy	
Royal New Zealand Yacht Squadron	Emirates Team New Zealand	(New Zealand) Dean Barker	
(Italy) Circolo della Vela Sicilia	Luna Rossa Challenge	(Italy) Massimiliano “Max” Sirena	

=== Artemis Racing (SWE) ===
The Challenger of Record, Artemis Racing represented the Royal Swedish Yacht Club and was led by skipper Iain Percy, helmsman Loïck Peyron and America's Cup veteran Paul Cayard as tactician and CEO. The crew included Rodney Ardern, Magnus Augustson, Stuart Bettany, Curtis Blewett, Chris Brittle, Sean Clarkson, Juliean Cressant, Rodney Daniel, Andy Fethers, Thierry Fouchier, John Gimson, Kevin Hall, Phil Jameson, Iain Jensen, Santiago Lange, Andrew McLean, Craig Monk, Nathan Outteridge, Troy Tindill and coach Andrew Palfrey. Tom Schnackenberg was in charge of performance & design.

=== Emirates Team New Zealand (NZL) ===
Led by Grant Dalton and skippered by Dean Barker, Team New Zealand won the America's Cup in 1995 and 2000 and the Louis Vuitton Cup in 1995 and 2007.

=== Luna Rossa Challenge (ITA) ===
Funded by Patrizio Bertelli, the Italian team previously won the Louis Vuitton Cup in 2000 and were runners-up in 2007. The crew included skipper Massimiliano Sirena, helmsman Paul Campbell-James, Chris Draper, Giulio Giovanella, Benjamin Durham, Pierluigi De Felice, Dave Carr, Giles Scott, Nick Hutton, Matteo Plazzi, Alister Richardson, Simone de Mari, Emanuele Marino, Manuel Modena, Marco Montis, Wade Morgan, Francesco Bruni and Olympian Xabier Fernández.

Steven Erickson was the team's sailing co-ordinator and Umberto Panerai was a trainer.

== Round Robins ==
The three yachts were scheduled to race ten times each, match-racing each competitor five times on a seven-leg course, with the winner of the Round Robins advancing to the final and the other two advancing into the semi-final.

On May 9, 2013, Team Artemis Racing's main boat capsized in strong winds, resulting in the death of crewmember Andrew Simpson. Artemis Racing forfeited its ten Round Robin races, entering the competition in the semi-finals stage.

Per rules 60.5 and 44.1c, the Artemis boat was deemed to have abandoned each race after the event had run for 10 minutes. While the Emirates and Luna Rossa boats earned black flag victories against Artemis, both boats chose to run a five-leg course for some (Luna Rossa) or all (Emirates, including one seven-leg) of these black flag races. Emirates and Luna Rossa only raced nine times, each forfeiting their final race against the missing Artemis as it could not change the final first-second standings of the Round Robins.

Emirates Team New Zealand won the Round Robins with nine points (4 race wins, 5 forfeit wins) to Luna Rossa Challenge's four points (4 forfeit wins) and Artemis Racing's zero points.

Round Robin	Date	Emirates Team New Zealand		(Italy) Luna Rossa Challenge		(Sweden) Artemis Racing		delta
1	July 7, 2013	46'26"	1	forfeit	0		0	
1	July 9, 2013	45'28"	2		0	forfeit	0	
1	July 11, 2013		2	28'58" (5-leg course)	1	forfeit	0	
2	July 13, 2013	43'52"	3	DNF (49'15")	1		0	5'23"
2	July 14, 2013	25'56" (5-leg course)	4		1	forfeit	0	
2	July 16, 2013		4	43'06" (5-leg course)	2	forfeit	0	
3	July 18, 2013	23'01" (5-leg course)	5		2	forfeit	0	
3	July 20, 2013		5	won (10' black flag)	3	forfeit	0	
3	July 21, 2013	48'10"	6	50'29"	3		0	2'19"
4	July 23, 2013	46'53"	7	DNF (54'07")	3		0	7'14"
4	July 25, 2013		7	won (10' black flag)	4	forfeit	0	
4	July 27, 2013	30'59" (5-leg course)	8		4	forfeit	0	
5	July 28, 2013	45'05"	9	48'26"	4		0	3'21"
5	July 30, 2013	forfeit	9		4	forfeit	0	
5	August 1, 2013		9	forfeit	4	forfeit	0	

== Semi-finals ==
The semi-finals were a best-of-seven event held over the seven-leg course and won 4-nil by Luna Rossa Challenge over Artemis Racing.

Date	(Italy) Luna Rossa Challenge	(Sweden) Artemis Racing	Delta	Score
August 6, 2013	43'20"	45'20"	2'00"	1-0
August 7, 2013	54'26"	56'32"	2'06"	2-0
August 9, 2013	47'36"	48'54"	1'18"	3-0
August 10, 2013	47'11"	49'23"	2'11"	4-0

== Finals ==
The finals were a best-of-thirteen event held over the five-leg course won by Team New Zealand over Luna Rossa.

Date	Emirates Team New Zealand	(Italy) Luna Rossa Challenge	Delta	Score
August 17, 2013	31'03"	DNF		1-0
August 18, 2013	DSQ	25'34"		1-1
August 19, 2013	22'28"	DNF		2-1
August 21, 2013	25'39"	27'57"	2'18"	3-1
August 21, 2013	24'26"	25'53"	1'27"	4-1
August 23, 2013	28'03"	30'00"	1'57"	5-1
August 24, 2013	23'38"	25'36"	1'58"	6-1
August 25, 2013	33'49"	37'09"	3'20"	7-1
