= Circolo della Vela Sicilia =

Yacht club in Italy

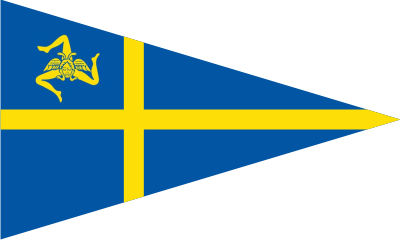
- Burgee
- Founded: May 14, 1933; 92 years ago
- Location: Mondello, Italy
- Commodore: Agostino Randazzo
- Website: www.circolodellavela.it

Circolo della Vela Sicilia is a yacht club in Mondello, a northern borough of Palermo, Sicily. The club was the "Challenger of Record" for the 36th America's Cup where they were represented by their team, Luna Rossa Challenge.

== See also ==
- Italy at the America's Cup
- Luna Rossa
