= Royal New Zealand Yacht Squadron =

Yacht club based in Auckland, New Zealand

Coordinates: 36.83742°S 174.746561°E

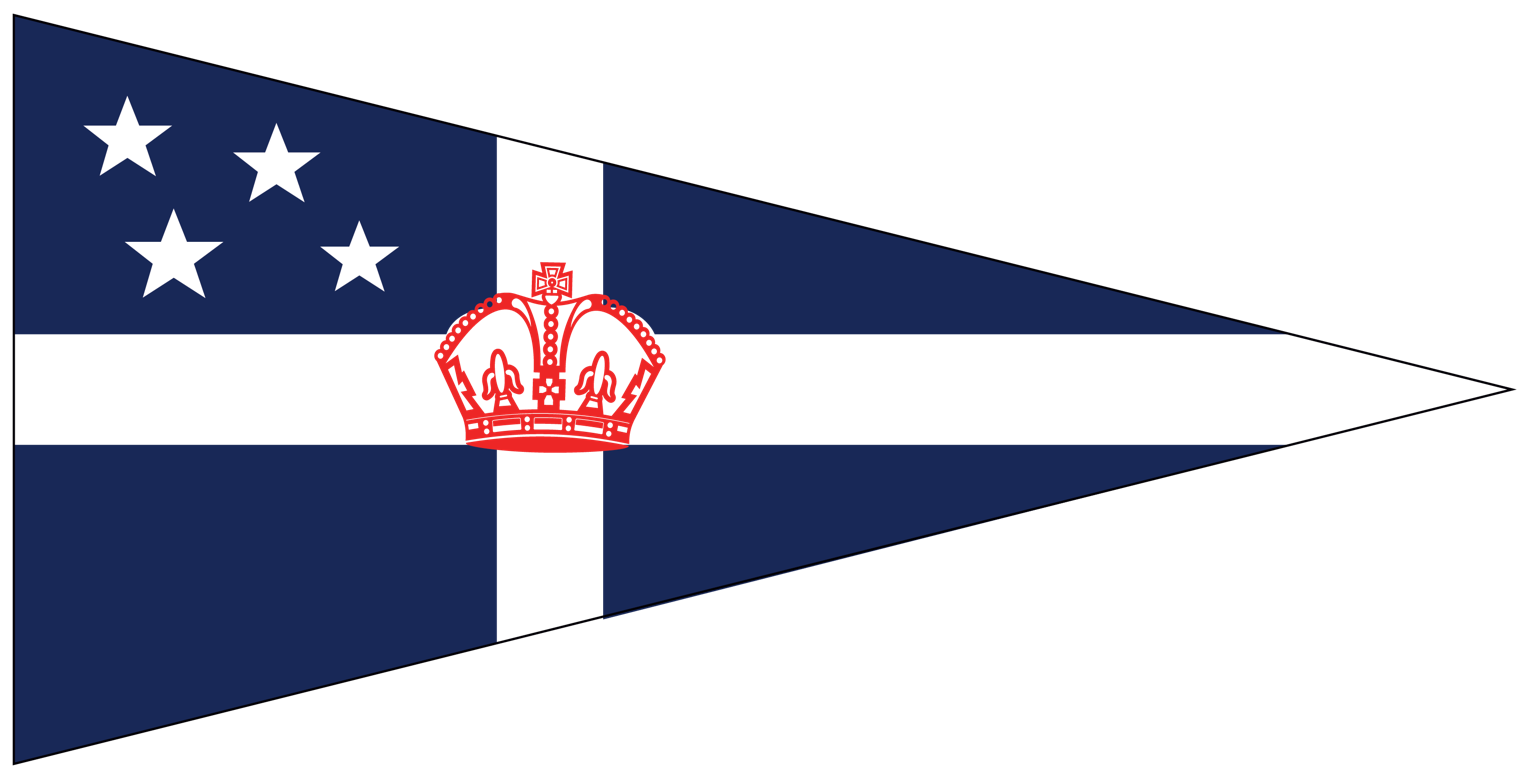
- Burgee

- Ensign
- Short name: RNZYS
- Founded: 1871; 155 years ago
- Location: Auckland, New Zealand
- Commodore: David Blakey
- Website: RNZYS.org.nz

The Royal New Zealand Yacht Squadron is a New Zealand yacht club, and through its teams New Zealand Challenge and Team New Zealand. It held the America's Cup between 1995 and 2003, losing it in 2003, becoming in 2000 the first non-American holder to successfully defend the trophy. Following Team New Zealand's victory in the 2017 America's Cup, the Royal New Zealand Yacht Squadron regained the trophy. They have since successfully defended the Cup at the 2021 and 2024 Cups, against Luna Rossa Prada Pirelli and INEOS Britannia respectively.

The club was established in Auckland in 1871 as the Auckland Yacht Club. Its name was changed to "Royal New Zealand Yacht Squadron" when it was granted royal patronage in 1902.

It is located in Westhaven Marina, Auckland, close to the Auckland Harbour Bridge facing on to the Waitematā Harbour and Hauraki Gulf / Tīkapa Moana.

The Royal New Zealand Yacht Squadron is one of the main members of the International Council of Yacht Clubs.

== See also ==
America's Cup title-holders

- New York Yacht Club, defeating the competition's founders, the Royal Yacht Squadron, 1851-1983
- Royal Perth Yacht Club, 1983-1987
- San Diego Yacht Club, 1987-1995
- Société Nautique de Genève, 2003-2010
- Golden Gate Yacht Club, 2010-2017

== Bibliography ==
- Elliot, Robin; Kidd, Harold; Pardon, David (1999). Southern Breeze – A History of Yachting in New Zealand (Hardback). Auckland: Penguin Books. ISBN 0-670-88650-5.
- Holmes, Noel (1971). Century of Sail - Official History of the Royal New Zealand Yacht Squadron (Hardback). Wellington: Whitcombe and Tombs. ISBN 0-7233-0305-3.
- Titchener, Paul (1978). Little Ships of New Zealand (Hardback). Wellington: A.H & A.W. Reed. ISBN 0-589-01068-9.
- Wilkins, Ivor (2010). Classic - The Revival of Classic Boating in New Zealand (Hardback). Auckland: Random House. ISBN 978-1-86962-162-9.
