= 2017 Louis Vuitton Challenger's Trophy =

Sailing competition held to determine the challenger in the 2017 America's Cup

9th Louis Vuitton Cup
Event information
- Type: challenge race for America's Cup
- Dates: 5 to 12 June 2017
- Host city: Bermuda
- Boats: Artemis Racing (Sweden); Emirates Team New Zealand; Groupama Team France; Land Rover BAR (United Kingdom); SoftBank Team Japan; Oracle Team USA (United States)
- Website: www.americascup.com

Results
- Winner: Emirates Team New Zealand

Succession
- Previous: 2013 Louis Vuitton Cup
- Next: 2021 Prada Cup

The 2017 Louis Vuitton Challenger's Trophy (officially, the Trophy was given to the winner of the 2017 Louis Vuitton America's Cup Challenger Playoffs) was a sailing competition held to determine the challenger in the 2017 America's Cup.

The tournament was an expansion of the previous Louis Vuitton Cup format, with the defender competing in the first round robin stage.

The races ran from 5 to 12 June 2017 in Bermuda and were preceded by the 2015–16 America's Cup World Series. It was won by Emirates Team New Zealand who defeated Artemis Racing in the final. The races were conducted using AC50 yachts, a new class of 50 feet (15 m) hydrofoiling wingsail catamarans, larger than the AC45F yachts used in the world series and smaller than the AC72 yachts used in 2013. Emirates Team New Zealand went on to compete with defending champions Oracle Team USA in the 2017 America's Cup match.

== Trophy ==
Louis Vuitton partnered with British silversmiths, Thomas Lyte, to create a special edition, one-off Challenger's Trophy. The trophy was crafted in 10 kg of sterling silver and stands at 70 cm high.

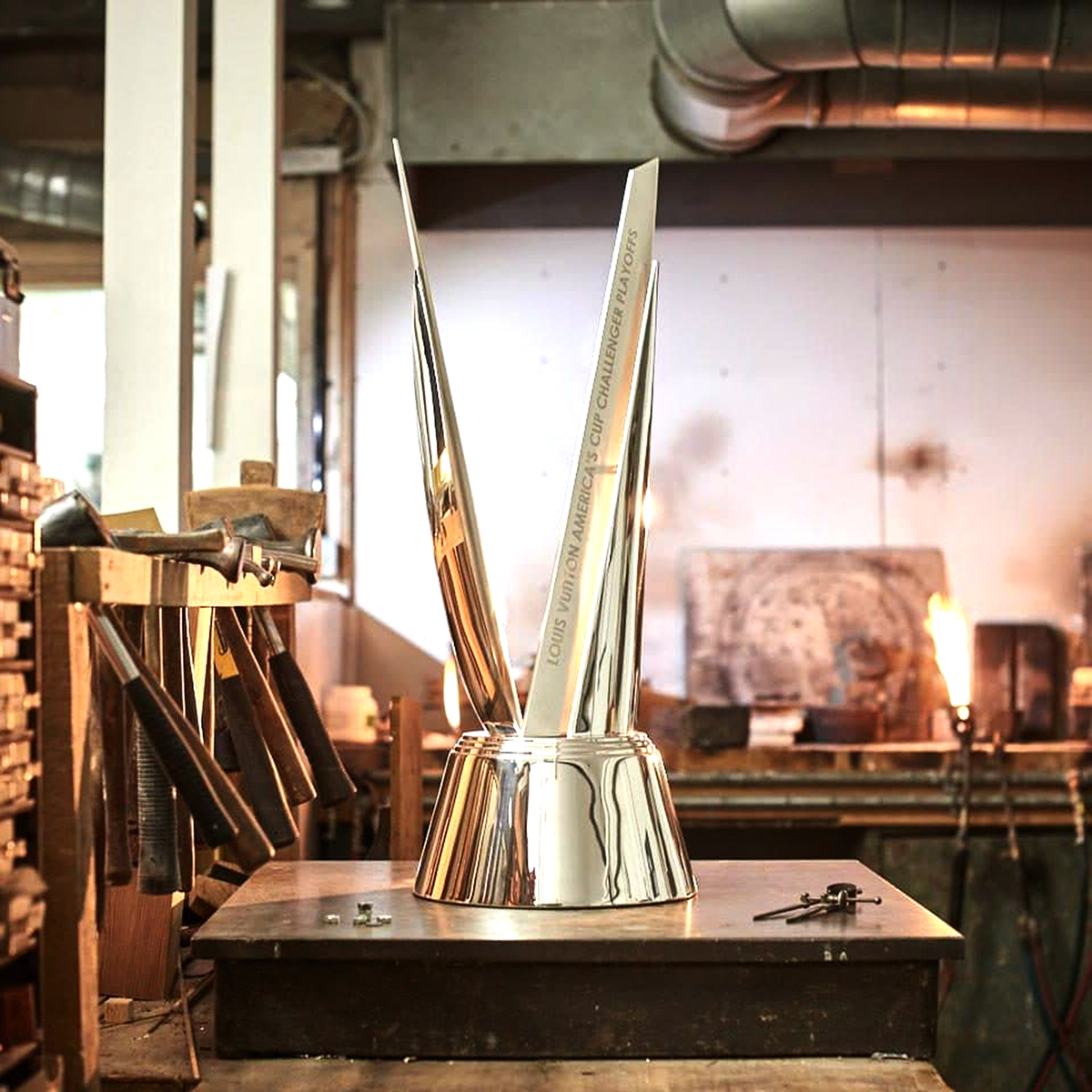
Louis Vuitton America's Cup Challenger Trophy

== Challenger of Record ==
On 1 October 2013, Australia's Hamilton Island Yacht Club was confirmed as the "Challenger of Record" for the 35th America's Cup. Only moments after the win by USA team Oracle, Hamilton Island Yacht Club (HIYC), located on the edge of the Great Barrier Reef in Queensland, Australia issued its challenge for the 35th America's Cup. The HIYC challenge was accepted by the Golden Gate Yacht Club, which remained the Defender and Trustee of the world's oldest international sporting trophy. Australian billionaire Bob Oatley was said to be financially backing the Hamilton Island Yacht Club as the Challenger of Record for the 35th America's Cup.

On 19 July 2014, Russell Coutts, Director of the America's Cup Event Authority (ACEA), announced that Hamilton Island Yacht Club had withdrawn Team Australia from the 35th America's Cup. Team Australia claimed that the new protocols as set forth by defending champion Oracle Team USA were too hard to prepare for when no dates or venue have been confirmed for the event.

A replacement for Hamilton Island Yacht Club as Challenger of Record was not named.

== Entry period ==
On 7 August 2014, the Royal New Zealand Yacht Squadron on behalf of their crew, Emirates Team New Zealand, became the first team to announce an official America's Cup entry. 8 August was the actual deadline for challengers and the defenders had previously mentioned that four teams had entered or planned to by the deadline: Luna Rossa (ITA), Artemis Racing (SWE), Team France (FRA) and Ben Ainslie Racing (GBR).

Ben Ainslie, ORACLE TEAM USA's tactician at the 2013 America's Cup, expressed serious interest in challenging his former employers with his own team based out of the United Kingdom.

In an interview on RadioLIVE on 8 June the New Zealand Prime Minister John Key referred to the new America's Cup rules as "Mickey Mouse" and said the government would not help fund a challenge. In a follow-up interview with Grant Dalton the same day, Dalton said that the team's knowledge of the catamaran was far more advanced than at the same stage with the AC72. He announced that Team NZ had secured the services of the designer who fitted the servo to the Team Oracle USA AC72 in the last America's Cup.

On 25 June 2014 Team New Zealand confirmed their intention to challenge in a media statement as they had gained sufficient private financial backing from private sources such as Sir Stephen Tindall without government assistance. Speaking on RadioLIVE, government minister Steven Joyce said he did not rule out a New Zealand government contribution after the election as the government's previous investments of $37 million NZ had yielded dividends of about $87 million NZ in the previous challenge.

Team New Zealand confirmed its team would build a challenger program for the next Americas Cup. Yachting commentators said Team New Zealand had an incredibly strong design, technical and support team. The sailing crew is drawn from a mix of previous Americas cup sailors and some of the kiwi gold medal winners at the last Olympic games.

== Competitors ==
=== Defender ===
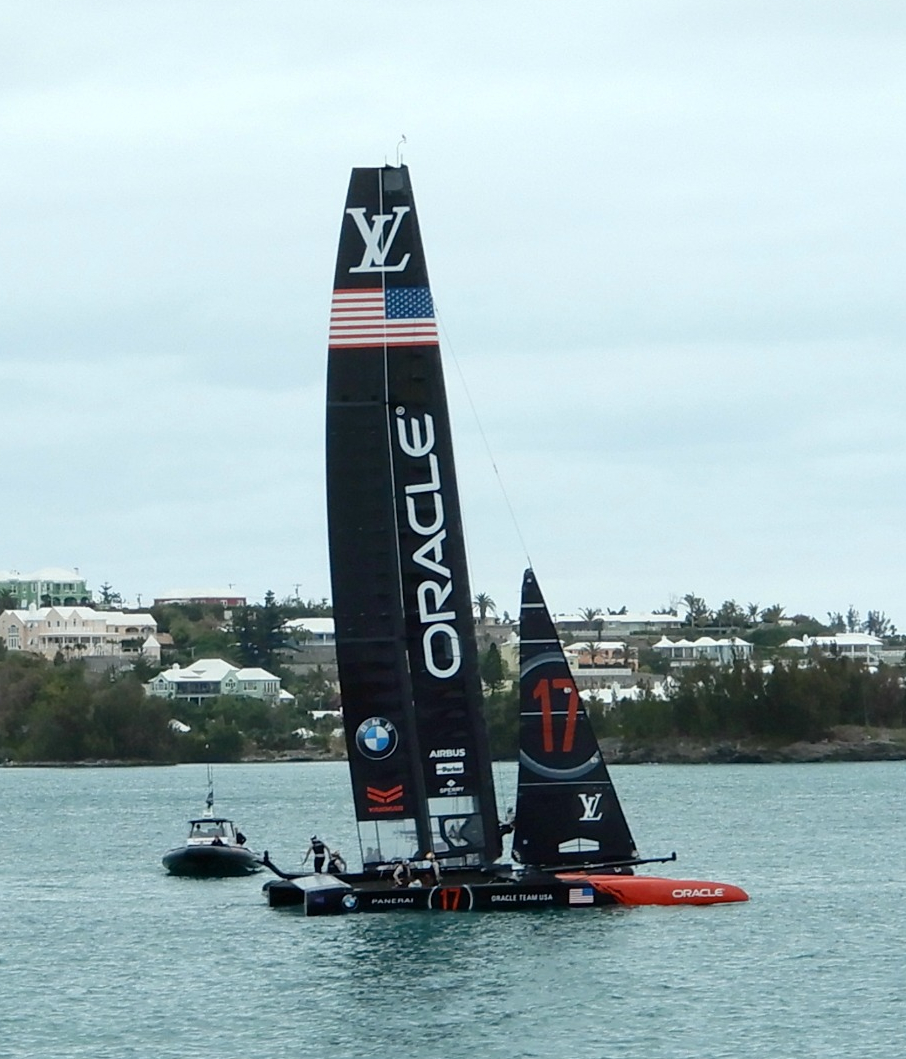
the defending yacht 17 undergoing sea trials

==== Golden Gate Yacht Club - Oracle Team USA ====
Crew:

- James Spithill (Helmsman)
- Kyle Langford
- Tom Slingsby (Tactician)
- Sam Newton
- Joey Newton
- Cooper Dressler
- Louis Sinclair
- Kinley Fowler
- Graeme Spence
- Ky Hurst

A defender competed in the Louis Vuitton Cup for the first time in the series' history, with Oracle Team USA retaining helmsman James Spithill and the core of his crew from the previous defense.

=== Challengers ===
==== Hamilton Island Yacht Club (Challenger of Record) - Team Australia (withdrawn) ====
Hamilton Island Yacht Club challenged for the 35th America's Cup up just minutes after GGYC's win in the 34th America's Cup in September 2013. However, in July 2014, the team pulled out of the Cup due to the high financial risk.

==== Circolo della Vela Sicilia - Luna Rossa Challenge (withdrawn) ====
In June 2014, Luna Rossa confirmed they would again be challenging for the Cup, and would retain most of their team, including helmsman Chris Draper, skipper Max Sirena, and tactician Francesco Bruni. However, after the Challenger Committee, along with Oracle Team USA, chose to reduce the size of the boats from the AC62 class to the AC50, Luna Rossa withdrew in protest.

==== Kungliga Svenska Segelsällskapet - Artemis Racing ====
Crew:

- Nathan Outteridge (Helmsman)
- Andreas Axelsson
- Luke Parkinson
- Karl Torlén
- Iain Percy (Tactician)
- Iain Jensen
- Anders Gustafsson
- Chris Brittle

Artemis mostly kept its crew intact from their previous challenge. After a win and a second-place finish in the last two World Series events, the team came into the Qualifiers with what appeared to be the fastest of the AC50 boats.

==== Royal New Zealand Yacht Squadron - Emirates Team New Zealand ====
Crew:

- Peter Burling (Helmsman)
- Glenn Ashby (Tactician)
- Blair Tuke
- Andy Maloney
- Josh Junior
- Simon van Velthooven
- Joseph Sullivan
- Guy Endean
- Carlo Huisman

After initial trouble with financial backing, Team New Zealand announced their intention to challenge in late June 2014. The team chose to replace longtime helmsman Dean Barker with 2013 Youth America's Cup winner and Olympic silver medalist Peter Burling. The team's AC50 boat includes a number of unique innovations, including replacing the grinders used by most teams with pedals.

==== Yacht Club de France - Groupama Team France ====
Crew:

- Franck Cammas (Helmsman)
- Thierry Fouchier
- Thomas Le Breton (Tactician)
- Olivier Herlédant
- Nicolas Heintz
- Matthieu Vandame
- Arnaud Jarlegan
- Devan le Bihan

In 2014, Franck Cammas' Groupama Sailing Team announced a challenge for the cup. The team had previously won the 2011–12 Volvo Ocean Race as well as the 2013 and 2015 editions of the Little America's Cup.

==== Royal Yacht Squadron - Land Rover BAR ====
Crew:

- Ben Ainslie (Helmsman)
- Paul Campbell-James
- Giles Scott (Tactician)
- Bleddyn Mon
- Jonathan Macbeth
- Neil Hunter
- Nick Hutton
- David Carr
- Ed Powys

After winning the 34th America's Cup as tactician for Oracle Team USA, British Sailor and four-time Olympic gold medalist Sir Ben Ainslie announced his own team, Ben Ainslie Racing (BAR), would be challenging for 35th Cup. In June 2015, the team partnered with Land Rover changed their name to Land Rover BAR.

Land Rover BAR won the AC45 World Series, and thus started the round robins with a two-point advantage.

==== Kansai Yacht Club - SoftBank Team Japan ====
Crew:

- Dean Barker (Helmsman)
- Chris Draper (Tactician)
- Ben Lamb
- Luke Payne
- Yuki Kasatani
- Yugo Yoshida
- Jeremy Lomas
- Derek Saward
- Simeon Tienpont

SoftBank Team Japan was the last team to file a challenge, in late April 2015. The challenge was spearheaded by America's Cup veteran Kazuhiko Sofuku. Former Team New Zealand helmsman Dean Barker joined the team as skipper and CEO in May, and British Olympic medalist and former Luna Rossa helmsman Chris Draper joined in June as tactician and Sailing Director. Due to the team's late entry, Oracle Team USA provided a design package for the team in order to kick-start their challenge.

== Results ==
=== Qualifier round robins ===
The five challengers and the defender, Oracle Team USA, competed in two round robins between 26 May and 3 June 2017. Points were awarded for every win. The lowest ranking competitor was eliminated and the highest ranking competitor will be awarded a point at the start of the America's Cup match if it reaches that stage of the competition. In the event of a tie for lowest or highest ranking, "the Louis Vuitton America’s Cup World Series standings" was to be "used as the tie breaker". The highest ranking challenger was able to pick its opponent in the semi-finals. The scores were:

Defender, advances directly to America's Cup match
Advances to Challenger playoffs
Eliminated

Team name	Races won	ACWS pts.	RR1 pts.	RR2 pts.	Total pts.
Oracle Team USA	8/10	1	4	4	9
Emirates Team New Zealand	8/10	0	4	4	8
Land Rover BAR	4/10	2	1	3	6
Artemis Racing	5/10	0	2	3	5
SoftBank Team Japan	3/10	0	2	1	3
Groupama Team France	2/10	0	2	0	2

round robin	date	Groupama Team France		(United Kingdom) Land Rover BAR		SoftBank Team Japan		Emirates Team New Zealand		(Sweden) Artemis Racing		(United States) Oracle Team USA		delta
1	26 May	CANCELLED - winds in excess of 24kt												
1	27 May	20'34.848"	0		2		0		0		0	18'23.962"	2	02'10.886"
1	27 May		0		2	19'08.161"	0		0	18'54.761"	1		2	00'13.400"
1	27 May	19'56.749"	0		2		0	17'23.786"	1		1		2	02'32.963"
1	27 May		0	18'03.389"	3		0		1	18'14.046"	1		2	00'10.657"
1	27 May		0		3		0	17'28.627"	1		1	17'22.571"	3	00'06.056"
1	27 May		0	18'35.728"	3	17'48.072"	1		1		1		3	00'47.656"
1	28 May	19'05.435"	1		3		1		1	19'08.674"	1		3	00'03.239"
1	28 May		1	17'25.939"	3		1		1		1	16'47.239"	4	00'38.700"
1	28 May		1		3	18'54.794"	1	18'21.554"	2		1		4	00'33.240"
1	28 May		1		3		1		2	19'01.107"	2	19'40.101"	4	00'38.994"
1	28 May		1	18'13.139"	3		1	16'45.567"	3		2		4	01'27.572"
1	28 May		1		3	19'13.576"	1		3		2	18'19.540"	5	00'54.036"
1	29 May	18'45.777"	2	19'38.176"	3		1		3		2		5	00'52.399"
1	29 May		2		3		1	19'03.669"	4	19'04.554"	2		5	00'00.885"
1	29 May	20'23.665"	2		3	17'50.051"	2		4		2		5	02'33.614"
2	30 May		2		3		2	16'27.574"	5	17'58.525"	2		5	01'30.951"
2	30 May	19'09.451"	2		3		2		5		2	17'12.982"	6	01'56.469"
2	30 May		2	17'55.530"	4		2		5	18'25.937"	2		6	00'30.407"
2	31 May	CANCELLED - winds under 6kt												
2	1 June	~24'28"	2		4	18'29.229"	3		5		2		6	~5'59"
2	1 June		2	RETIRED (5/6)	4		3	18'50.639"	6				6	
2	1 June		2		4	18'32.859"	3		6		2	18'00.868"	7	00'31.991"
2	1 June	23'10.142"	2	22'47.369"	5		3		6		2		7	00'22.773"
2	2 June		2		5	16'41.929"	3	15'56.000"	7		2		7	00'45.929"
2	2 June		2		5		3		7	16'59.272"	3	17'23.528"	7	00'24.256"
2	2 June	21'29.324"	2		5		3	17'23.747"	8		3		7	04'05.577"
2	2 June		2		5	19'08.790"	3		8	18'50.575"	4		7	00'18.215"
2	3 June		2		5		3	20'09.438"	8		4	19'40.530"	8	00'28.908"
2	3 June		2	20'30.423"	6	20'43.619"	3		8		4		8	00'13.196"
2	3 June	~22'15"	2		6		3		8	19'39.780"	5		8	~2'35"
2	3 June		2	18'43.047"	6		3		8		5	18'07.557"	9	00'35.490"

Emirates Team New Zealand and defender Oracle Team USA were dominant in the round robins, with 8 wins each. New Zealand did not lose to a single challenger, both of their losses coming against Oracle. Artemis Racing and Land Rover BAR had shaky starts to the series (aided in part by a controversial penalty assessed against Artemis), but both came back strong in the second round robin. SoftBank Team Japan and Groupama Team France both struggled to win races, especially the French, who often lost races by several minutes. With only two wins, the French were eliminated and did not advance to the semi-finals. By virtue of their single point from the AC45 World Series, Oracle Team USA won the Qualifiers, giving them an automatic bonus point in the America's Cup match. As the highest-placed challenger, Emirates Team New Zealand won the right to choose their semi-finals opponent.

=== Challenger playoffs ===
==== Semi-finals ====
The top four challengers after the round robins advanced to best-of-nine semi-finals, held between 4 and 8 June 2017. As the highest placed challenger, Emirates Team New Zealand had the right to choose their opponent, and chose to face Land Rover BAR.

semi-final 1					date	semi-final 2				
(United Kingdom) Land Rover BAR		Emirates Team New Zealand		delta	date	SoftBank Team Japan		(Sweden) Artemis Racing		delta
CANCELLED - winds under 6kt					4 June	CANCELLED - winds under 6kt				
RETIRED (3/7)	0	BLACK FLAG (4/7)	1		5 June	17'49.642"	1	18'12.239"	0	00'22.597"
DID NOT START	0	BLACK FLAG (1/7)	2		5 June	19'23.219"	1	18'54.639"	1	00'28.580"
21'49.175"	0	19'39.256"	3	02'09.919"	6 June	19'32.839"	2	RETIRED (7/9)	1	
BLACK FLAG (2/9)	1	DID NOT FINISH (0/9)	3		6 June	21'13.713"	3	21'40.408"	1	00'26.695"
CANCELLED - winds in excess of 24kt					7 June	CANCELLED - winds in excess of 24kt				
19'09.650"	1	18'38.166"	4	00'31.484"	8 June	20'28.641"	3	19'49.712"	2	00'38.929"
17'27.332"	2	17'46.921"	4	00'19.589"	8 June	18'05.841"	3	17'37.915"	3	00'27.926"
18'17.643"	2	17'37.915"	5	00'39.728"	8 June	21'16.370"	3	19'30.812"	4	01'45.558"
					9 June	19'09.101"	3	18'56.701"	5	00'12.400"

Land Rover BAR retired on leg 2 of the first semi-final race due to a camber arm failure; With the team unable to effect repairs before the subsequent race scheduled that day, two points were awarded to Team New Zealand. With winds peaking at 25.9kt during races on June 6, all four teams suffered visual damage to aerodynamic fairings, notably the port hydraulic daggerboard rams aboard Artemis Racing were exposed. After rounding mark #6 90s behind Team Japan and unable to reduce deficit, Artemis Racing retired. Pinned at the windward mark of the start line by opponent Land Rover BAR in the second race of June 6, Team New Zealand lost control of trim whilst bearing away after the starting gun, pitchpoling and capsizing their yacht; With the crew unable to right the boat without help from their support boat, they were subsequently disqualified when they were boarded by other team members. Team New Zealand and Artemis Racing won their respective semi-finals, advancing to the Challenger's Final.

==== Final ====
A best-of-nine final was held between 10 and 12 June. Team New Zealand registered five wins within the first seven races, advancing to the 2017 America's Cup match, which will be a best-of-thirteen races held between 17 and 27 June 2017.

Team New Zealand were presented with the newly made Louis Vuitton Challenger's Trophy.

final	Emirates Team New Zealand		(Sweden) Artemis Racing		delta
10 June	19'16.755"	1	20'04.143"	0	00'47.388"
10 June	18'36.051"	1	18'21.361"	1	00'14.690"
10 June	16'04.024"	2	RETIRED (6/7)	1	
11 June	18'34.341"	2	18'19.300"	2	00'15.041"
11 June	17'49.080"	3	RETIRED (6/7)	2	
11 June	17'37.631"	4	17'39.018"	2	00'01.387"
12 June	ABANDONED - 25' time limit exceeded				
12 June	17'16.515"	5	18'12.691"	2	00'56.176"
