= 2015–16 America's Cup World Series =

America's Cup World Series
- Sport: Sailing
- Founded: 2011
- No. of teams: 6
- Country: New Zealand; United States; France; Sweden; United Kingdom; Japan
- Most recent champion(s): Land Rover BAR
- Related competitions: America's Cup

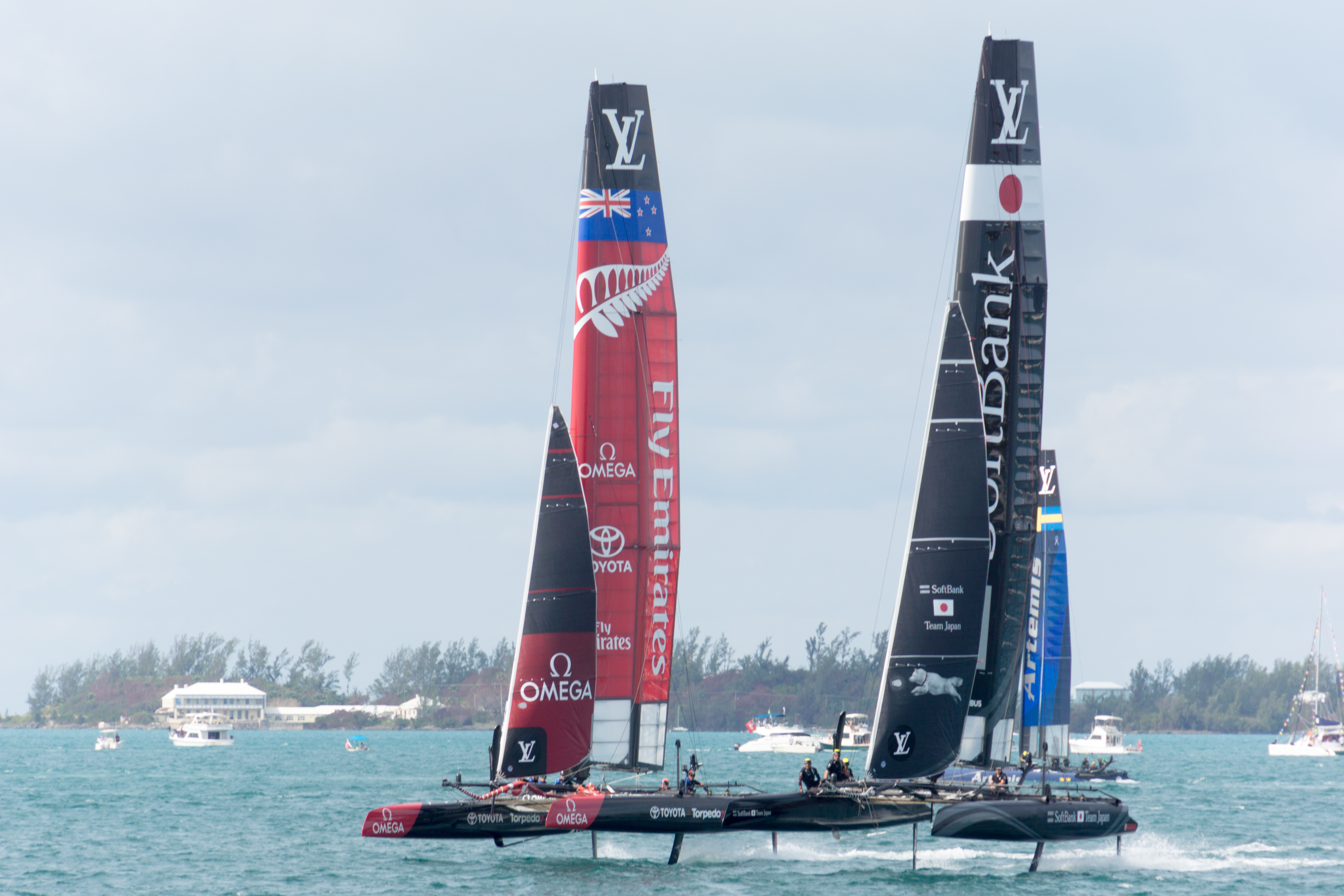
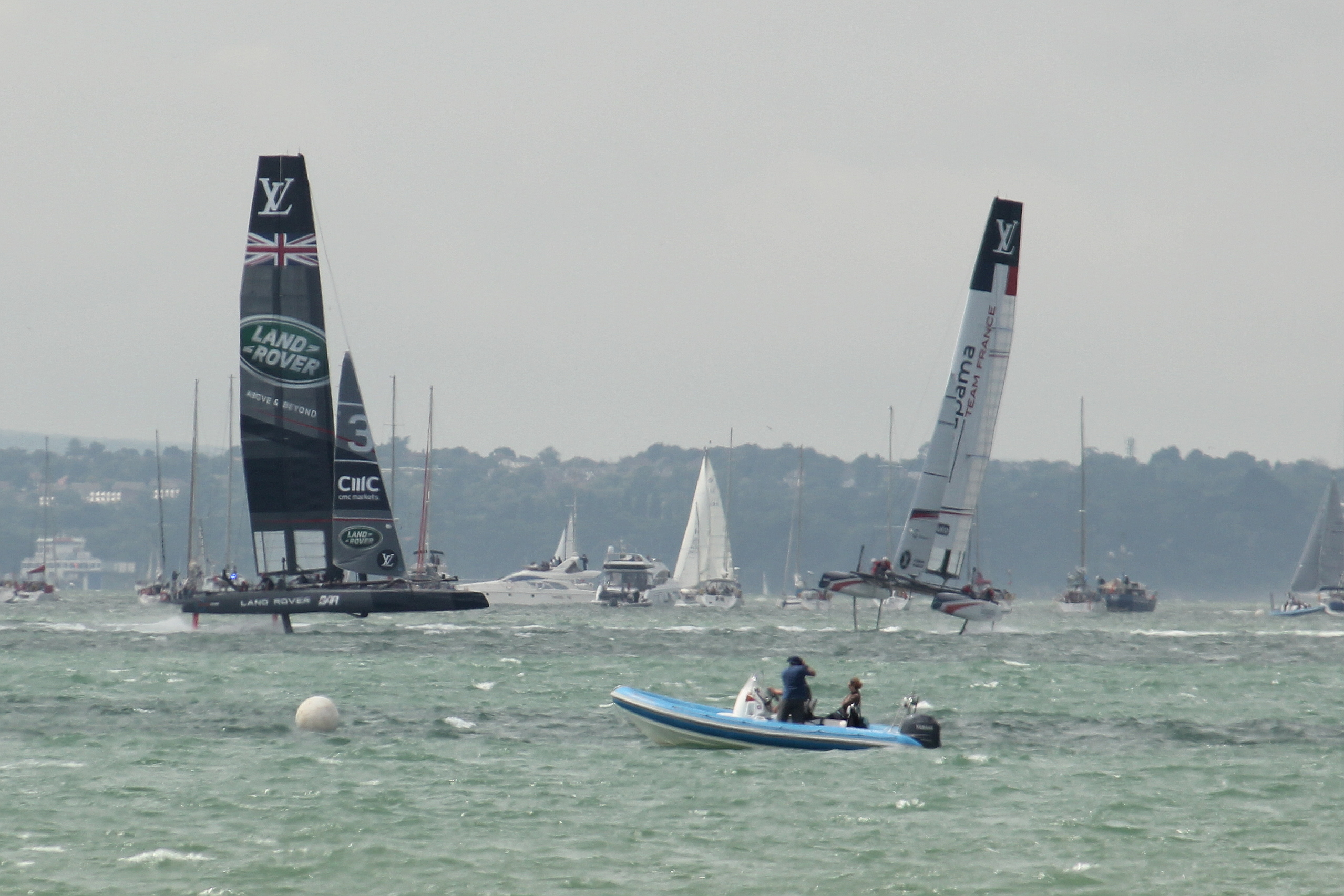
AC45Fs in Bermuda, left, and Portsmouth, right

The second America's Cup World Series were held between 2015 and 2016 in the lead up to the 2017 America's Cup. The series was won by Land Rover BAR and confers two points towards the 2017 Louis Vuitton Cup. The runner up was Oracle Team USA which confers one point toward the next competition. The series awards points exclusively for fleet races. They were raced in AC45F catamarans, modified from the previous AC45 series to incorporate hydrofoiling capability for improved performance, in strict one-design. The design is smaller than the AC50 class that was used in the 2017 America's Cup.

== Teams ==
Club	Team	Helmsman
(United States) Golden Gate Yacht Club	Oracle Team USA	(Australia) James Spithill
(United Kingdom) Royal Yacht Squadron	Land Rover BAR	(United Kingdom) Ben Ainslie
Royal New Zealand Yacht Squadron	Emirates Team New Zealand	(New Zealand) Peter Burling (Australia) Glenn Ashby
(Japan) Kansai Yacht Club	Softbank Team Japan	(New Zealand) Dean Barker
Yacht Club de France	Groupama Team France	(France) Franck Cammas (New Zealand) Adam Minoprio
(Sweden) Royal Swedish Yacht Club	Artemis Racing	(Australia) Nathan Outteridge (Italy) Francesco Bruni

== Standings ==
Team	Portsmouth; 25–26 Jul 2015				Gothenburg; 29–30 Aug 2015				Bermuda; 17–18 Oct 2015					Muscat; 27–28 Feb 2016						New York; 7–8 May 2016					Chicago; 11–12 Jun 2016						Portsmouth; 23–24 Jul 2016						Toulon; 10–11 Sep 2016						Fukuoka; 19–20 Nov 2016						Standings
Team	1	2	3	4	1	2	3	4	1	2	3	4	5	1	2	3	4	5	6	1	2	3	4	5	S	1	2	3	4	5	1	2	3	4	5	6	1	2	3	4	5	6	1	2	3	4	5	6	Standings
(United Kingdom) Land Rover BAR	10	9	CAN		9	9	16	12	CAN		16	10	18	8	10	10	18	14	16	CAN		18	12	12	6	CAN		20	14	18	6	10	10	20	18	18	5	5	10	16	20	14	10	8	9	14	18	16	512
(United States) Oracle Team USA	9	7	CAN		10	10	14	14	CAN		20	16	12	9	6	9	12	20	18	CAN		14	18	18	5	CAN		14	18	12	9	9	5	18	20	20	8	6	7	14	12	10	7	9	10	16	16	12	493
Team New Zealand	8	10	CAN		8	8	18	20	CAN		12	18	20	10	7	5	20	16	12	CAN		16	16	20	7	CAN		12	16	16	8	5	7	16	12	14	9	9	5	12	10	18	9	6	8	18	14	10	485
(Sweden) Artemis Racing	6	5	CAN		7	5	20	10	CAN		18	20	14	7	5	8	14	12	10	CAN		20	10	10	9	CAN		18	20	14	5	6	6	12	14	10	10	10	8	20	16	12	8	7	6	20	20	14	466
Softbank Team Japan	7	6	CAN		6	7	12	18	CAN		14	14	16	6	9	6	16	10	14	CAN		12	14	16	10	CAN		16	10	20	7	8	8	14	16	16	6	7	6	18	14	20	6	10	5	12	10	18	460
Groupama Team France	5	8	CAN		5	6	10	16	CAN		10	12	10	5	8	7	10	18	20	CAN		10	20	14	8	CAN		10	12	10	10	7	9	10	10	12	7	8	9	10	18	16	5	5	7	10	12	20	419
races cancelled for winds over 25kt: July 26, 2015; races cancelled for winds under 6kt: October 17, 2015; May 7, 2016; June 11, 2016 (June 10, 2016 practice race used as substitute)

== See also ==
- 2017 America's Cup
