= Simeon Tienpont =

Dutch sailor (born 1982)

Simeon Tienpont (born 20 January 1982) is a Dutch sailor who has competed in multiple Volvo Ocean Races and America's Cups.

He first participated in the Volvo Ocean Race in 2005-06 aboard ABN Amro II.

Tienpont joined Oracle Team USA for the 2010 America's Cup and was a grinder during the 2013 America's Cup. He was allegedly involved in the cheating scandal involving Oracle's America's Cup World Series boats, but was never charged with any offence. He was named the 2013 Dutch sailor of the year.

He sailed on board Team Vestas Wind during the 2014–15 Volvo Ocean Race.

Originally a member of Luna Rossa Challenge for the 2017 America's Cup, Tienpont joined Team Japan for the 2017 Louis Vuitton Challenger’s Trophy after Luna Rossa withdrew. For the 2017–18 Volvo Ocean Race, Tienpont was announced skipper of Team AkzoNobel. However, on October 13, the day before the first scoring race, it was announced that, due to a breach of contract by his company, STEAM Racing, Tienpont's contract as skipper was terminated by Team AkzoNobel. The decision was reversed, and Tienpont was once again announced as skipper of Team AkzoNobel less than two hours before the start of leg 1 of the 2017–18 Volvo Ocean Race.
