= Thierry Fouchier =

French sailor

Thierry Fouchier (born 14 March 1966) is a French sailor who has competed in multiple America's Cups.

From Marseille, Fouchier sailed with Le Defi at the 2000 Louis Vuitton Cup and with Victory Challenge at the 2007 Louis Vuitton Cup.

He then joined Oracle Racing and was the trimmer on USA 17 that won the 2010 America's Cup. He then joined Mascalzone Latino as their spinnaker trimmer, before sailing with Artemis Racing in the 2013 America's Cup.

He sailed in the 2017 America's Cup with the Groupama Sailing Team. He has also sailed in the Extreme Sailing Series with Groupama.
