= 2013 America's Cup =

Series of boat races held on San Francisco Bay

34th America's Cup
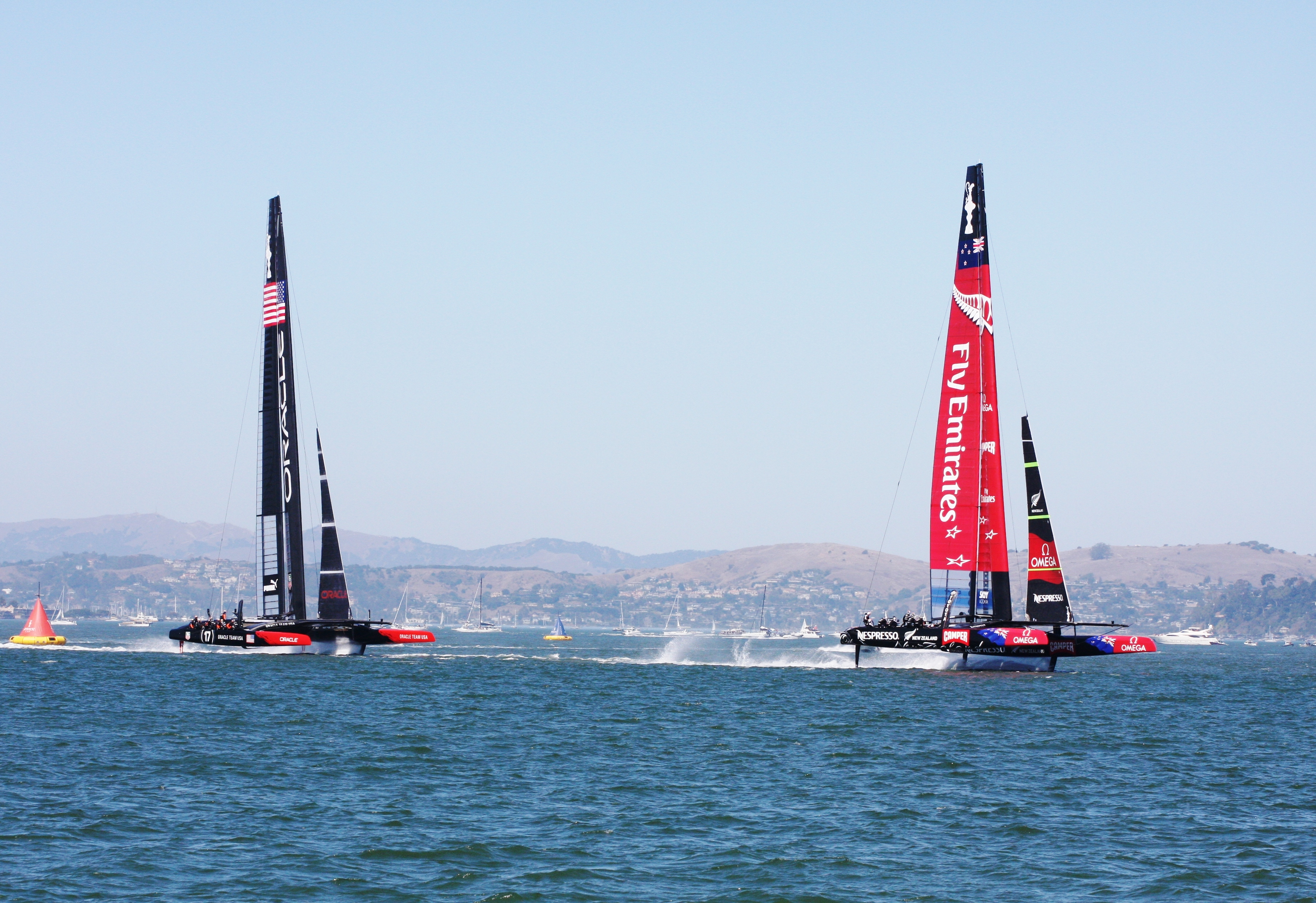
- Team New Zealand leading Oracle Racing in the first race

Defender United States
- Defender club: Golden Gate Yacht Club
- Yacht: Oracle Team USA 17

Challenger New Zealand
- Challenger club: Royal New Zealand Yacht Squadron
- Yacht: Aotearoa

Competition
- Location: San Francisco, California
- Dates: September 2013
- Rule: AC72
- Winner: Golden Gate Yacht Club
- Score: (United States) 9 (New Zealand) 8

The 34th America's Cup was a series of yacht races held in San Francisco Bay in September 2013. The series was contested between the defender Oracle Team USA team, representing the Golden Gate Yacht Club, and the challenger Emirates Team New Zealand, representing the Royal New Zealand Yacht Squadron.

The 2013 Cup saw the format changed from previous iterations to a best of 17, making it the longest America's Cup event by both number of days and number of races. Team New Zealand won the right to challenge for the Cup by previously winning the 2013 Louis Vuitton Cup. The challengers initially built an 8-1 lead, before Oracle Team USA won 8 consecutive races and successfully defended the title. As a result, the Cup became the first since the 1983 America's Cup to feature both teams in a match point situation.

== Background ==
The Golden Gate Yacht Club defeated Société Nautique de Genève in the 2010 America's Cup to become the Defenders of the 2013 America's Cup. The first Challenger of Record for the 34th Cup was Club Nautico di Roma, and a joint press conference was held on May 6, 2010, to plan for the event. The planning process was to include a definition of new rules and an independent management team.

== Protocol ==
The Protocol for the 34th America's Cup was published on September 13, 2010.

=== Boats ===
Two new classes of boat were announced. AC72 wing-sail foiling catamarans are being used for the America's Cup races and the AC45 class, a scaled-down one-design version of the AC72, was used for the preliminary training and racing until boats built to the AC72 rules became available. The amended AC72 Class Rule version 1.1 was published on February 22, 2011.

The AC72 can reach speeds averaging about 30 knots (56 km/h; 35 mph) with peaks over 40 knots (74 km/h; 46 mph), as much as twice the actual wind speed. This was a significant increase over previous Americas's Cup Class (ACC) boats, which only reached speeds of 11 to 13 knots (20 to 24 km/h; 13 to 15 mph).

=== America's Cup World Series ===
In an effort to increase global awareness and attract sponsors for the teams, an America's Cup World Series was held over the 2011–12 and 2012–13 seasons. The winner of each annual series was declared the America's Cup World Series Champion for that season. There were three regattas in 2011, five in 2012, and two in 2013. Each regatta lasted for one week and had approximately six days of racing, including official practice. Each AC World Series regatta was a combination of match and fleet racing. AC45 one-design catamarans were used for each World Series regatta.

=== Cost reduction ===
The 2013 protocol included measures to reduce competition costs in an effort to attract more challengers. These included the introduction of no-sail periods to limit on-water training, as well as limits to the amount of equipment (including boats) which teams could field. Boats were not allowed to be launched prior to July 1, 2012, and could only be sailed for limited windows in the run-up to the Cup. Crew sizes were also limited to 11 sailors. However, the cost of a competitive challenge remained high, with estimates placing it in excess of US$100 million.

=== Youth America's Cup ===
Alongside the initial world series races, the AC45 class boats were used in the nationality-based 'Youth America's Cup', allowing younger sailors to familiarise themselves with the technology used before moving to the larger AC72. The YAC began in 2013, when both first and second places were taken by New Zealand entries. The winning team included Peter Burling, Blair Tuke, Jono Spurdle, Sam Meech, Andy Maloney, Jason Saunders and Guy Endean.

== Venue ==
Reliable wind and weather patterns were a key consideration in deciding a host city, in order to allow guaranteed racing in line with pre-published television schedules and reduce the risk of the postponements which had caused issues at the 2010 event. Cities including San Francisco, San Diego, Newport and Long Beach were considered earlier as possible venues for this event. On July 8, 2010, Oracle Team USA announced that San Francisco was "the only city in the USA under consideration to host the 34th America's Cup" match. At the time, KGO-TV and Gazzetta dello Sport, an Italian sports newspaper, reported that Rome-Fiumicino, Italy was challenging San Francisco to host the event. In early December 2010, BMW Oracle Racing became concerned that a full and final agreement with San Francisco would not be completed in time to announce the host by the end of the year, warning the city that they were at risk of losing the hosting rights and reopening negotiations with Newport as a potential alternative venue for the cup. However, on December 31 San Francisco was officially awarded the right to host the 2013 America's Cup.

== Teams ==
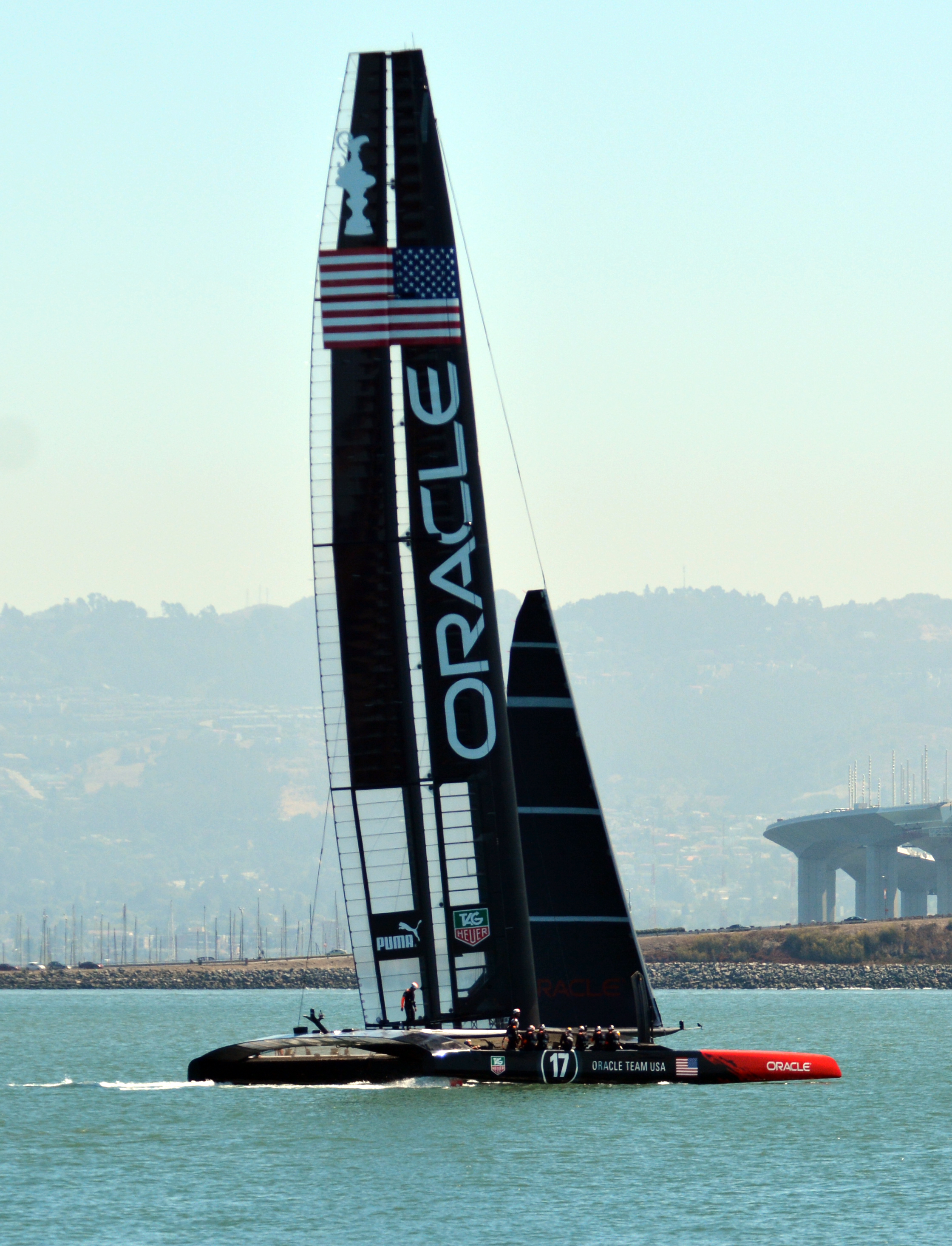
Team Oracle's AC72

Initially, fourteen yacht clubs submitted notices of entry within the deadline. Of these, two were declined and ten withdrew. Club Nautico di Roma was originally named as the Challenger of Record, but after their team Mascalzone Latino withdrew the Challenger of Record became the Royal Swedish Yacht Club, sponsoring Artemis Racing. Other notable teams that withdrew included former Cup holder Alinghi and the Energy Team from Yacht Club de France.

On August 2, 2012, the America's Cup Event Authority announced that four challenging teams would compete for the right to challenge Oracle Team USA, representing the defending Golden Gate Yacht Club. These teams were Artemis Racing (the Challenger of Record) representing the Royal Swedish Yacht Club, Emirates Team New Zealand representing the Royal New Zealand Yacht Squadron, Luna Rossa Challenge representing Circolo della Vela Sicilia and the White Tiger Challenge representing Sail Korea Yacht Club. Luna Rossa, a late entry, formed a partnership with Team New Zealand where they would share design and testing information. Following Sail Korea's withdrawal in March 2013, the number of challengers dropped to three.

Defending club
(United States) Golden Gate Yacht Club	Oracle Team USA
Challenging clubs
(Sweden) Kungliga Svenska Segelsällskapet	Artemis Racing
Royal New Zealand Yacht Squadron	Emirates Team New Zealand
(Italy) Circolo della Vela Sicilia	Luna Rossa Challenge

== Course and rules ==
The course for the 34th America's Cup was designed to take advantage of the San Francisco Bay and bring racing within easy viewing of the shore for the first time. The starting area was furthest away from the shore, close to the Golden Gate Bridge. The boats were only allowed to enter the starting box two minutes before the usage of the starting gun, with the boat entering on port tack allowed to enter ten seconds before the starboard tack boat in order to reduce the risk of a collision at speed in the starting area. Alcatraz Island was a unique part of the racecourse for this event. For the first week of the event, San Francisco Bay experienced flood tides during the America's Cup races. As water flowed into the bay, there was a cone close to the Island where the incoming tide was noticeably less than the rest of the racecourse. On the upwind leg, when boats had to sail against the flood tide, tactical use of this cone was crucial.

- After the starting gun signalled the start, the first leg was a short reach of around 0.5 nautical miles (0.93 km; 0.58 mi) towards the shore.
- After rounding the reach mark, the boats travelled downwind to the leeward gate. This second leg was around 2.5 nautical miles (4.6 km; 2.9 mi) in length. At the bottom of the course, the leeward gate had two different marks. Rounding either mark completed the leg.
- The third leg stretched around 3 nautical miles (5.6 km; 3.5 mi) from the leeward gate to the windward gate. This upwind leg was the longest leg timewise, even though the AC72s are able to sail upwind close to twice the speed of the wind against them. The windward gate also had two separate marks, with the skippers able to choose either to complete the leg.
- On the fourth and final downwind leg, the boats aimed for the leeward mark that is closer to the shore.
- Rounding this mark put them on a reach sprint to the finish. The fifth leg was around 1 nautical mile (1.9 km; 1.2 mi) in length. The finish line was right in front of America's Cup Park, at Piers 27/29.

The length of the course varied, but was around 10 nautical miles (19 km; 12 mi) and generally took about 25 minutes to complete. During the 2013 Louis Vuitton Cup on the same course, some races were raced with an extra lap around the leeward and windward gates. This seven leg course was around 16 nautical miles (30 km; 18 mi) and took approximately 45 minutes to sail.

The racecourse was delineated by a boundary, exceeding which would cause a penalty to be incurred. The first boat which reached within the three boat lengths of a mark would be given right of way unless when there was an overlap between the two boats. If this happened, room had to be made to ensure both boats could round the mark safely. Each race had a time limit of 40 minutes, after which the race would be stopped.

== Results ==
=== Challenger determination ===
The challenger was determined in the 2013 Louis Vuitton Cup challenger selection series. Emirates Team New Zealand won the Louis Vuitton Cup and therefore the right to challenge Oracle Team USA in the America's Cup.

=== Cheating penalty ===
An international jury found Oracle Team USA guilty of cheating during the America's Cup World Series warmup event in 2012 when they placed bags of lead pellets in their 45-foot catamarans to add additional weight outside of allowed areas. Penalties imposed included expelling three team members, a $250,000 fine, and a one-point penalty for each of the first two races of the Match in which they would otherwise score a point. This last penalty meant that Oracle had to win 11 races to retain the trophy, while New Zealand only needed to win 9 races to lift the cup.

=== Cup matches ===
The 34th America's Cup was held between challenger Team New Zealand and defender Oracle Team USA on a five-leg course on San Francisco Bay. One point was awarded for winning a race, and a total of nine points were needed to win the cup. Due to the two race penalty assessed on Oracle Team USA, they needed 11 wins to defend the cup.

Wins marked in green
Postponed or Abandoned races marked in red

Race	Date	PDT	(United States) Oracle Team USA	Team New Zealand	Delta	Score	
Race	Date	PDT	(United States) Oracle Team USA	Team New Zealand	Delta	(United States)	(New Zealand)
1	September 7, 2013	1:15pm	24:06	23:30	00:36	0	1
2	September 7, 2013	2:15pm	23:38	22:46	00:52	0	2
3	September 8, 2013	1:15pm	25:28	25:00	00:28	0	3
4	September 8, 2013	2:15pm	22:42	22:50	00:08	0^{1}	3
5	September 10, 2013	1:15pm	23:50	22:45	01:05	0	4
P^{2}	September 10, 2013	2:15pm	Postponed	—	—	0	4
6	September 12, 2013	1:15pm	32:26	31:39	00:47	0	5
7	September 12, 2013	2:15pm	25:54	24:48	01:06	0	6
8	September 14, 2013	1:15pm	23:09	24:01	00:52	0^{1}	6
A^{3}	September 14, 2013	2:15pm	—	—	—	0	6
9	September 15, 2013	1:15pm	21:53	22:40	00:47	1	6
10	September 15, 2013	2:15pm	22:17	22:00	00:17	1	7
^{4}	September 16, 2013	—	—	—	—	1	7
P^{5}	September 17, 2013	1:15pm	—	—	—	1	7
P^{5}	September 17, 2013	2:15pm	—	—	—	1	7
11	September 18, 2013	1:15pm	23:56	23:41	00:15	1	8
P^{5}	September 18, 2013	2:15pm	—	—	—	1	8
12	September 19, 2013	1:15pm	23:49	24:20	00:31	2	8
P^{5}	September 19, 2013	2:15pm	—	—	—	2	8
A^{6}	September 20, 2013	1:20pm	—	—	—	2	8
13	September 20, 2013	2:33pm	27:20	28:44	01:24	3	8
P^{7}	September 21, 2013	1:15pm	—	—	—	3	8
P^{7}	September 21, 2013	2:15pm	—	—	—	3	8
14	September 22, 2013	1:15pm	33:47	34:10	00:23	4	8
15	September 22, 2013	2:22pm	27:34	28:11	00:37	5	8
16	September 23, 2013	1:45pm	30:43	31:16	00:33	6	8
P^{8}	September 23, 2013	2:15pm	—	—	—	6	8
17	September 24, 2013	1:15pm	24:04	24:31	00:27	7	8
18	September 24, 2013	2:15pm	22:01	22:55	00:54	8	8
19	September 25, 2013	1:15pm	23:24	24:08	00:44	9	8

^{1} Oracle's victories in races 4 and 8 did not award points, due to the penalty imposed by the jury.
^{2} Oracle used their postponement card after race 5, canceling the second race scheduled for September 10.
^{3} With Team New Zealand leading during the third leg, the second race on September 14 was abandoned by the race committee due to the wind exceeding the allowed maximum.
^{4} September 16 was on the schedule as a reserve day and would have been used to make up for races already missed. However by agreement of both teams it was treated as a lay day.
^{5} Both races on September 17, and the second races on both September 18 and September 19, were postponed due to the wind exceeding the allowed maximum beyond a reasonable start time.
^{6} With Team New Zealand well ahead in light winds near the end of the fourth leg, the first race on September 20 was abandoned by the race committee due to the race exceeding the 40-minute time limit.
^{7} Both races on September 21 were postponed by the race committee due to the wind direction not permitting a fair laying of the race course.
^{8} Due to the late start of race 16, a second race was not sailed on September 23 due to the 2:40pm cutoff time for racing.

== Defender and challenger personnel ==
Oracle Team USA

Role	Name	Races
Principal Backer	(United States) Larry Ellison	
CEO	(New Zealand) Russell Coutts	
Skipper	(Australia) Jimmy Spithill	
Tactician	(United States) John Kostecki	1-5
	(United Kingdom) Ben Ainslie	6-19
Strategist	(Australia) Tom Slingsby	
Wing Trimmer	(Australia) Kyle Langford	
Jib Trimmer	(Australia) Joe Newton	
Off-side trimmer	(United States) Rome Kirby	
Grinders	(Antigua and Barbuda) Shannon Falcone, (New Zealand) Joe Spooner, (New Zealand) Jono MacBeth, (Italy) Gillo Nobili, (Netherlands) Simeon Tienpont	

Emirates Team New Zealand

Role	Name	Races
Managing Director	(New Zealand) Grant Dalton	
Skipper	(New Zealand) Dean Barker	
Tactician	(New Zealand) Ray Davies	
Wing Trimmer	(Australia) Glenn Ashby	
Trimmer	(New Zealand) James Dagg	
Bow	(Australia) (New Zealand) Adam Beashel	
Pit	(New Zealand) Jeremy Lomas	
Pedestal 1	(New Zealand) Chris Ward	
Pedestal 2	(New Zealand) Rob Waddell	
Pedestal 3	(New Zealand) Grant Dalton	1–3, 5–7, 9–12, 17, 19
	(New Zealand) Winston MacFarlane	4, 8, 13–16, 18
Pedestal 4	(New Zealand) Chris McAsey	
Float / Grinder	(New Zealand) Derek Saward	

== Progress of the regatta ==
=== Day 1: September 7 ===
The 34th America's Cup began in contrast to the one-sided races that dominated the 2013 Louis Vuitton Cup. Team New Zealand, skippered by Dean Barker, led at the first mark, and held the lead for the second leg, which was the first leg to be facing downwind. Oracle Team USA was 4 seconds behind Team New Zealand at the bottom mark, and during the upwind third leg the lead changed several times. Team New Zealand led at the top mark by 25 seconds, and kept the lead until the finish line, winning by 36 seconds.

Race two began as the previous one ended, with Team New Zealand in front, despite the aggressive prestart by Oracle's skipper Jimmy Spithill. Team New Zealand led the whole race, and completed the victory by 52 seconds to lead 0–2 in the overall scoreline.

=== Day 2: September 8 ===
Oracle Team USA had more success in the initial stages of Race three, as Spithill luffed Team New Zealand at the reach mark to successfully draw a penalty. Oracle held the lead for the first downwind leg, and were 18 seconds to the good heading into the upwind third leg. The pivotal moment of the race occurred when Barker brought the New Zealand boat back on port tack within three boat lengths of the boundary. Oracle was forced to tack away due to the boundary rights, even though they were on starboard, which would have otherwise have had right of way. The 29 second lead at the top mark was held by Team New Zealand all the way to the finish. They ultimately crossed the finish line 28 seconds ahead of Oracle, making the scoreline 0–3 to Team New Zealand.

Race four saw Oracle again lead from the start, reaching a lead of 6 seconds by the first reach mark. Although Barker pushed hard for the whole race, Spithill was able to hold off Team New Zealand, resulting in a finish 8 seconds ahead of Barker. Due to the penalty imposed by the International Jury, Oracle did not score a point, leaving the New Zealand remaining 3 points ahead.

=== Day 3: September 10 ===
Team New Zealand had once again lagged behind on the first leg before taking the lead when heading upwind. By the top mark, Team New Zealand were 1 minute 17 seconds ahead, a lead which they held for the remainder of the race. Oracle lost race five by one minute and five seconds, after which the team used its Postponement Card to call off the scheduled second race. The score at the end of the day was 0–4 to Team New Zealand.

=== Day 4: September 12 ===
On day four, Oracle Team USA announced that they had dropped John Kostecki, who had raced on San Francisco Bay for decades, in favour of Sir Ben Ainslie, the skipper of Oracle's backup boat. Another change was the noticeably lighter winds compared to the earlier days of racing.

Race six followed a familiar refrain, with Oracle ahead at the start and holding that lead to the bottom of the downwind leg. After rounding the mark 12 seconds behind, Team New Zealand once again took over sailing into the wind. Despite a high number of tacks, Team New Zealand gained 55 seconds during the third leg, leading by 44 seconds at the top mark which extended to 47 seconds at the finish.

Team New Zealand led from start to finish in Race 7. After a run of being behind at the start, Barker was strong in the windward position off the line and was able to beat Oracle Team USA by a substantial amount at the reach mark. Along with another substantial gain during the third leg, Oracle Team USA could not counter Team New Zealand's progress and finished 1:06 behind. Team New Zealand closed the day ahead 0–6.

=== Day 5: September 14 ===
In race eight, Team New Zealand nearly capsized. Leading from the start to midway up the third leg, Team New Zealand was tacking back to starboard to once again cover Oracle. However, a lack of hydraulic power during the turn meant that the sail did not move in time, causing the boat's starboard hull to rise out of the water. Following the incident, Barker was penalised for failing to give way to Oracle, which was on starboard tack at the time. The New Zealand boat followed Spithill to finish 52 seconds behind.

Oracle's victory completed the penalty imposed by the International Jury, allowing them to accrue points for any subsequent victories.

Team New Zealand were ahead during the third leg of the day's second race, but it was abandoned by the Race Committee due to the wind exceeding the 22.6-knot (41.9 km/h; 26.0 mph) allowable maximum (23 knots (43 km/h; 26 mph) minus the 0.4 knots (0.74 km/h; 0.46 mph) tide).

=== Day 6: September 15 ===
In race nine, Oracle Team USA won the start and extended its lead at each mark. Unlike in previous races, Oracle extended their lead at every mark (including those upwind), allowing Oracle to obtain a point for the first time in the series and setting the score at 1–6.

Team New Zealand won race ten by 16 seconds; multiple reports described the race as among the most competitive of the series. Barker looked to have been left behind by Spithill at the startline, but managed to hold an overlap as the AC72s entered the three boat length circle at the reach mark. Team New Zealand took the 3 second lead, and increased it to 11 seconds at the second mark. Oracle again showed their new competitiveness during the upwind beat, and the lead changed three times. As the boats approached the top mark on split tacks, Barker slowed the boat, and then aimed down to pass under Oracle at speed. The top mark split was only 1 second as Oracle rounded in front of the shore, and Aotearoa rounded the other mark. With the race still too close to call during the downwind leg, Spithill made the call to dip behind Team New Zealand rather than jibe. The gap almost instantly became 100 metres. Barker was able to hold this lead to the finish, taking the series to 1–7. In the post race press conference, Barker said "If you didn’t enjoy today’s racing you should probably watch another sport."

=== Day 7: September 17 ===
September 16 was scheduled as a reserve day. It would have been used to make up for races that had already been missed, however it was instead treated a rest day by agreement of both teams on the day. The next schedule race day was September 17 however high winds resulted in a postponement. Both teams were keen to race, and headed out to the starting area. However the start time for the first race was pushed back several times due to the 20.1-knot (37.2 km/h; 23.1 mph) wind limit, and with the wind continuing to increase, at 1:31 pm the Race Committee made the postponement official.

=== Day 8: September 18 ===
Team New Zealand led all the way to win race eleven by 15 seconds, to move to match point in the race for the Cup. During the pre-start, Barker manoeuvred in front of Spithill, delaying both boats from crossing the start line until well after the gun had gone. Oracle performed well on the upwind beat, but Team New Zealand covered well, and the boats rounded opposite marks 17 seconds apart. At the final mark, Barker kept Aotearoa between Oracle and the mark, and the rounding was well below the usual speed. Team New Zealand were able to accelerate away leaving Oracle almost stationary in the water on the sprint to the finish line, taking the score to 1–8.

The second race of the day suffered a 15-minute wind delay postponement. The postponement came at the same as the boats hit the start line. Barker had perfected a time on distance sprint to the line, to obtain a lead on the way to the reach mark. The boats made their way back to the starting area, but the wind and the strong outgoing tide combined to confirm the postponement of racing for the day.

=== Day 9: September 19 ===
Barker was aggressive in the pre-start phase of the first race of Day 9. However, Spithill positioned Oracle such that Team New Zealand was forced to keep clear and ultimately allowing Oracle to led the whole race, eventually wining race twelve by 31 seconds. Oracle performed stronger on the uphill leg than in previous races, and were able to sail on their foils at speeds approaching 32 knots (59 km/h). Oracle gained their second point to take the score to 2–8.

The start time for the second race of the day was pushed back several times due to the wind exceeding the allowed limit. At one point the teams were able to enter the starting box, but the wind then exceeded the limit again. Racing was then postponed for the day, allowing Oracle to keep alert for another day.

=== Day 10: September 20 ===
Day ten brought the lightest winds seen in the 34th America's Cup. The start of the first race was pushed back by five minutes, due to the need to shift one of the marks on the start line. Oracle had the better start in the 8-knot (15 km/h; 9.2 mph) winds, and luffed Team New Zealand at the reach mark. The first downward leg was very different from the rest of the racing, as neither boat was able to sail on its foils. Aotearoa appeared to be the stronger boat in the light breeze, and rounded the leeward gate 1:42 ahead of the Americans. The New Zealand boat continued to extend their lead during the third leg. The race was ultimately abandoned due to the time limit being exceeded, despite 90 percent of the race being completed and Team New Zealand being ahead by more than 1,000 metres.

The resail of race thirteen began at 2:33pm in 12 knots (22 km/h; 14 mph) of wind. Spithill attempted to hook Barker during the pre start to gain advantage, but Barker managed to prevent Oracle from gaining the overlap. Team New Zealand led over the line, and took a 3-second lead around the reach mark. The pivotal moment of the race came towards the end of the second leg. Team New Zealand were slightly ahead and tried to cross in front of Oracle who had the starboard tack advantage. Spithill had to evade the Kiwi boat, and gained a penalty for the infraction. With the boats still close heading into the leeward gate, a mistake by Team New Zealand forced two jibes in quick succession and left the boat almost non-moving. Oracle led from this point, ultimately winning by 1:24 in what was their biggest winning margin in the Cup. Oracle's victory brought the score to 3–8.

=== Day 11: September 21 ===
Poor conditions, including rain and southerly winds, caused the race committee to push the start of day 11's racing back several times, hoping that the wind would turn enough to allow racing. This did not happen by the start cut off time, and weather again forced postponement of the day's racing.

=== Day 12: September 22 ===
Racing on the 22nd of September brought the America's Cup into its third week, equalling the previous longest regatta in Cup history, the 31st America's Cup. A whale was also spotted in San Francisco Bay, bringing enough of a concern that it was tracked to ensure it would not affect racing.

Race fourteen was another start-to-end win by Oracle. Starting in the leeward position, Spithill again luffed Barker hard substantially past the reach mark. This set up a strong lead for the first downwind beat. On the upwind leg Team New Zealand were able to close the lead, and at one point had to dip under the American boat. However, they could not utilise the advantage to enough effect, and Oracle led well around the top mark. Team New Zealand once again closed the lead about halfway down the fourth leg, but could not make the pass. Oracle won by 23 seconds, to bring the score to 4–8.

Team New Zealand led off the line for race fifteen, but the leeward position of the Oracle Team USA boat allowed them to round the reach mark first. A strong downwind leg from the American boat saw them round the leeward gate 1 minute ahead of Team New Zealand. Team New Zealand cut Oracle's lead in half by the windward gate, but were unable to make up the rest of the gap. Oracle had their best day in the race yet, winning both races to bring the score to 5–8.

=== Day 13: September 23 ===
The start of race sixteen was delayed for 30 minutes while the race committee waited for the wind to increase. Emirates Team New Zealand took the leeward position at the start line but Oracle Team USA was able to sail on their foils, and sailed over on top of the New Zealand boat to lead by five seconds at the reach mark. At the second mark, the New Zealand team were 13 seconds behind Oracle and after a tacking duel upwind to the third mark, Oracle was able to obtain the wind advantage for the downwind leg. Oracle sailed conservatively downwind gaining a 21-second lead for the fourth mark, which they extended to 33 seconds by finish line, taking the score to 6–8.

The earlier delay meant no second race for the day, as it would have exceeded the cutoff time of 2:40pm.

=== Day 14: September 24 ===
Race seventeen saw two penalties at the start against Emirates Team New Zealand. During the prestart, Dean Barker made his move too early, allowing Spithill to hook Barker. Oracle then took full advantage of their windward-leeward right of way, forcing Barker to attempt to stay out of the way. Due to the extremely low boat speed at the time, Team New Zealand was unable to avoid the American boat, and there was contact between the two AC72s as a second penalty was awarded against the New Zealand boat. By the time the penalties had been completed, Oracle had accelerated away to find themselves ahead by 18 seconds at the reach mark. Oracle built on this to obtain a 29-second lead to leeward gate, although this was trimmed to 19 seconds at the end of the third leg. Oracle went on to win by 27 seconds and cut Team New Zealand's lead to 7–8.

"We're not going to stop--we're going to keep going all the way to the end", said Spithill. "We really want this. You can sense it on board". Barker called this defeat "an absolute shocker" as he ended in "a really dead spot".

In race eighteen the New Zealand boat led at the start and up to the first mark. They set the speed record of the series, reaching 47.57 knots (24 m/s; 88 km/h; 55 mph) as they rounded the mark, to lead by 5 seconds. They kept the lead during the first downwind run, but Oracle took the lead at the first crossing on the upwind leg, after Team New Zealand made a poor tack. Team New Zealand had starboard tack advantage and the lead at the time, but did not cover Oracle. The American boat was sailing on their foils, and was able to sail past Team New Zealand without much difficulty. Oracle went on to lead by 57 seconds at the windward gate and kept the lead for the rest of race, winning by 54 seconds.

This result tied the series 8–8 and forced a winner-take-all race. Spithill called this win "very impressive" and said, "It gives us a lot of confidence going into tomorrow", saying that Wednesday will be "the most exciting day in the history of our lives. We wouldn't want to be anywhere else".

=== Day 15: September 25 ===
The final day of the 34th America's Cup brought only the third winner-takes-all match in Cup history (previous such matches had occurred in 1920 and 1983). Barker and Spithill had also both moved into the top 5 all time America's Cup skippers during this regatta.

Team New Zealand had port entry advantage, and were able to convert this into the leeward position at the start line and a lead around the reach mark. Oracle had a moment where both bows dipped into the water, slowing them to open some separation between the two boats. The first downwind leg saw both boats foiling at around 40 knots (74 km/h; 46 mph), at times well within 100 metres (330 ft) of each other. Team New Zealand took the lead into the upwind third leg, but were unable to hold it. Oracle once again showed their upwind foiling ability and were able to pass. Team New Zealand and Barker refused to give up, but in the absence of any mistakes from Oracle, they confirmed their victory 9–8 by 44 seconds on the line to the cheers of the crowd.

At the press conference following the race, Barker said his team was "[feeling] pretty smashed, they are feeling it pretty bad", whilst Spithill said Team New Zealand were a "tough team".

== Safety issues concerning the AC72 ==
Following the announcement of AC72-class boats being used for the 2013 America's Cup, their power and speed attracted criticism as a potential safety risk. Oracle's first AC72 pitch-poled in October 2012 after only eight days of sailing. Though there were no injuries to the crew, the yacht was heavily damaged as the tide pulled it outside the bay into the Pacific Ocean. On May 9, 2013, Swedish team Artemis' first AC72 yacht flipped, resulting in the death of Olympic gold medalist Andrew James Simpson. Stephen Barclay, CEO of the America's Cup Event Authority, promised a full inquiry into the events leading to Simpson's death and appointed a review committee to investigate both the Oracle and Artemis accidents, and to make recommendations for increasing the safety of the sailors.

== Broadcasting ==
The NBC Sports Group acquired the American television broadcast rights in 2012, making it the first time the race would be on network TV since 1992.

The first two races aired on NBC with subsequent races airing live on NBC Sports Network. The races were also broadcast live and available on demand on the official America's Cup YouTube channel.

To enhance television coverage, America's Cup officials developed LiveLine, a system that inserts graphics into live shots from helicopters similar to the first down line graphics system used on American football broadcasts. LiveLine would be used to show distance between boats, boat speed, course boundaries and marks, boat paths, wind speed and ocean current direction. Race yachts carried military grade GPS tracking and telemetry systems to enhance the accuracy of measurements.

The system, developed by Sportvision, Inc., the America's Cup Event Authority, and NBC Sports Network, won the George Wensel Outstanding Technical Achievement Award at the 33rd Sports Emmy Awards.

=== International broadcasters ===
- Worldwide: YouTube
- Host broadcaster: NBC, NBC Sports Network

==== North America ====
- Canada: Sportsnet, RDS

==== Europe ====
- France, Monaco: Canal+
- Austria:, Germany, Liechtenstein, Luxembourg, Switzerland: Servus TV
- Cyprus: CYBC
- Czech Republic, Slovakia: Nova Sport
- Spain: RTVE
- Portugal: Sport TV
- Ireland: Sky Sports
- Sweden: TV4
- Russia: Ocean TV
- United Kingdom: Sky Sports

==== Asia and Oceania ====
- Australia: Fox Sports
- Bangladesh, Bhutan, Brunei, Cambodia, China, East Timor, India, Indonesia, Laos, Macau, Malaysia, Maldives, Mongolia, Myanmar, Nepal, New Caledonia, Pakistan, Papua New Guinea, Philippines, South Korea, Sri Lanka, Taiwan: Fox Sports, STAR Sports
- Hong Kong: PCCW
- India: TEN Sports
- Japan: TBS, TBC
- New Zealand: TVNZ
- Singapore: SingTel, Fox Sports, STAR Sports

==== South America ====
- ESPN

==== Africa and the Middle East ====
- OSN

== 35th America's Cup ==
Only moments after the win by Oracle Team USA, Hamilton Island Yacht Club in Queensland, Australia issued a challenge for the 2017 America's Cup. The challenge was accepted by the Golden Gate Yacht Club, which remained defender. Australian billionaire Bob Oatley was said to be financially backing the Hamilton Island Yacht Club as the Challenger of Record.

HIYC withdrew its challenge on 18 July 2014, and in November 2014 it was announced that Bermuda would host the 2017 America's Cup.

== See also ==
- Deed of Gift of the America's Cup
