= Jeremy Lomas =

New Zealand sailor

Jeremy Lomas is a New Zealand sailor who has been involved in multiple America's Cups.

Lomas sailed on Merit Cup during the 1997–98 Whitbread Round the World Race.

He joined Team New Zealand before their 2000 America's Cup defence and worked as a bowman. He stayed with the team and was a part of their 2003, 2007 and 2013 campaigns. He also sailed in the Extreme Sailing Series for Team New Zealand.

Lomas left Team New Zealand in 2015 and later followed Dean Barker to SoftBank Team Japan and sailed for Japan during the 2017 America's Cup.

He has also competed in the Kenwood Cup, Admiral's Cup, the Fastnet Race and the Sydney to Hobart Yacht Race.
