= Derek Saward =

New Zealand sailor

Derek Saward is a New Zealand sailor who has competed in multiple America's Cups.

Saward has raced in the Transpacific Yacht Race two times and also spent four seasons on the RC44 circuit.

Saward joined Team New Zealand as a grinder in July 2011. He sailed in all of the races at the 2013 America's Cup. He left Team New Zealand in June 2015.

He joined SoftBank Team Japan in July 2015, reuniting with skipper Dean Barker. He sailed with Team Japan in the 2017 Louis Vuitton Challenger’s Trophy.
