= Daniel Bernasconi =

British yacht designer

- Born: 11 July 1973 (age 53); Ashow, Warwickshire, England
- Education: University of Cambridge; University of Southampton
- Employers: McLaren Racing; Team New Zealand
- Known for: America's Cup yacht design and with Formula One for work as an aerodynamicist

Daniel Bernasconi (born 1973) is a British America’s Cup yacht designer, specializing in hydrodynamic design and performance optimization. He is currently the Technical Director of Team New Zealand and a Founding Director of SumToZero, a specialist yacht design consultancy.

Bernasconi has worked in both Formula One and the America’s Cup as a race engineer. As Technical Director Bernasconi led the winning Team New Zealand yacht design teams in both the 2017 and 2021 America’s Cup.

== Career ==
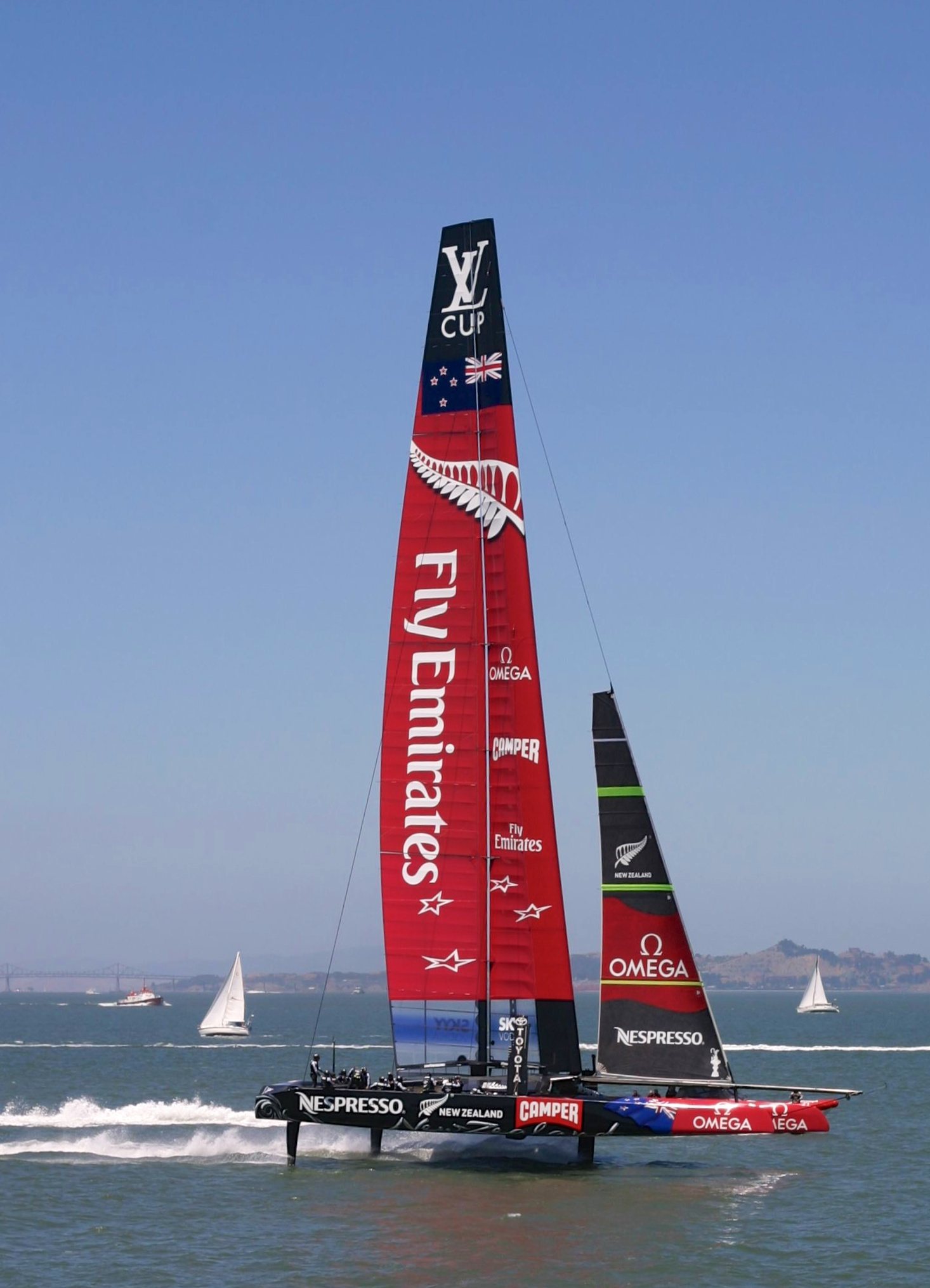
Team New Zealand AC72, San Francisco Bay

After graduating with a Master of Engineering degree from the University of Cambridge Bernasconi worked first as a structural engineer at Ove Arup & Partners. He then spent six years at McLaren Racing as a vehicle dynamics engineer and team leader of vehicle modeling. Whilst at McLaren, the team won two Drivers’ World Championships with Mika Hakkinen and one Constructor’s World Championship.

Bernasconi made the switch to yacht design after completion of a PhD in Mathematical Modeling and Aerodynamics at the University of Southampton subsequently running the Velocity Prediction Program and designing hydrofoils for Alinghi in their 2010 America's Cup campaign against Oracle Team USA. When Alinghi’s America’s Cup campaign ended, Bernasconi developed Gomboc, a proprietary software program which became Emirates Team New Zealand’s velocity prediction tool through the development of the AC72 class of wingsail foiling catamaran in 2013.

Bernasconi has led Team New Zealand’s winning design teams for the development of both the AC50 and AC75 America's Cup yacht classes.

== Honours and awards ==
- In 2017 Bernasconi was awarded the John Britten Black Pin by the Designers Institute of New Zealand for his role as Technical Director and design team lead for the winning AC50 yacht used by Team New Zealand in their 2017 America's Cup victory.
