= Joey Newton =

Australian sailor

Personal information
- Nationality: Australian
- Born: 16 December 1977 (age 47)

Sport
- Sport: Sailing

Joey Newton (born 16 December 1977) is an Australian sailor who has competed in multiple America's Cups.

Newton originally sailed Sabots, 420s and Lasers in Australia. He then joined Syd Fischer's Young Australia Challenge for the 2000 Louis Vuitton Cup with skipper Jimmy Spithill. He has competed on every America's Cup campaign since with Spithill. Together they won the 2001 Fastnet Race.

He sailed with One World Challenge in the 2003 Louis Vuitton Cup and Luna Rossa Challenge in the 2007 America's Cup.

He then joined Oracle Racing and sailed on USA 17 when it won the 2010 America's Cup. He was the trimmer on Oracle Team USA 17 when they defended the 2013 America's Cup and he also sailed in the 2017 America's Cup.

He was part of the crew that won the 2005 ISAF Open Match Racing World Championship and the 2010 RC44 World Championships, on both occasions with Spithill.
