= Grinder (sailing position) =

Yacht crew position

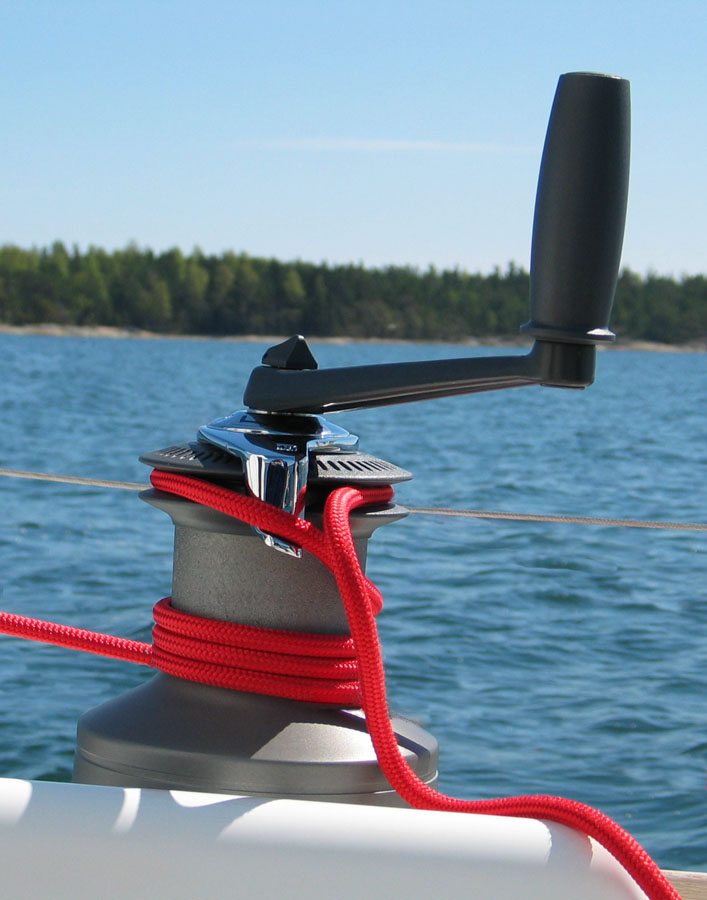
Winch

A grinder is a crew member on a yacht whose duties include operating manual winches (called "coffee grinders") that raise and trim the sails and move the boom. It is a physically demanding role with a significant impact on a racing yacht's overall performance.

The AC50 class yachts used in the America's Cup competition have four positions (on each side) for grinders. These must be continuously operated to generate the hydraulic pressure needed by the yacht's controls. Until 2017, the machinery was arm operated winches. However, in 2017 Team New Zealand changed their grinding system to pedal operated positions (cyclors) similar to exercise bikes. This change reportedly gained a 40% increase in power delivered to the hydraulic system. In 2018, a decision was made to ban cyclors in the 36th America's Cup (2021) They were subsequently re-allowed for AC37 (2024).
