= AC50 =

Class of racing catamaran yacht that was developed for the 2017 America's Cup

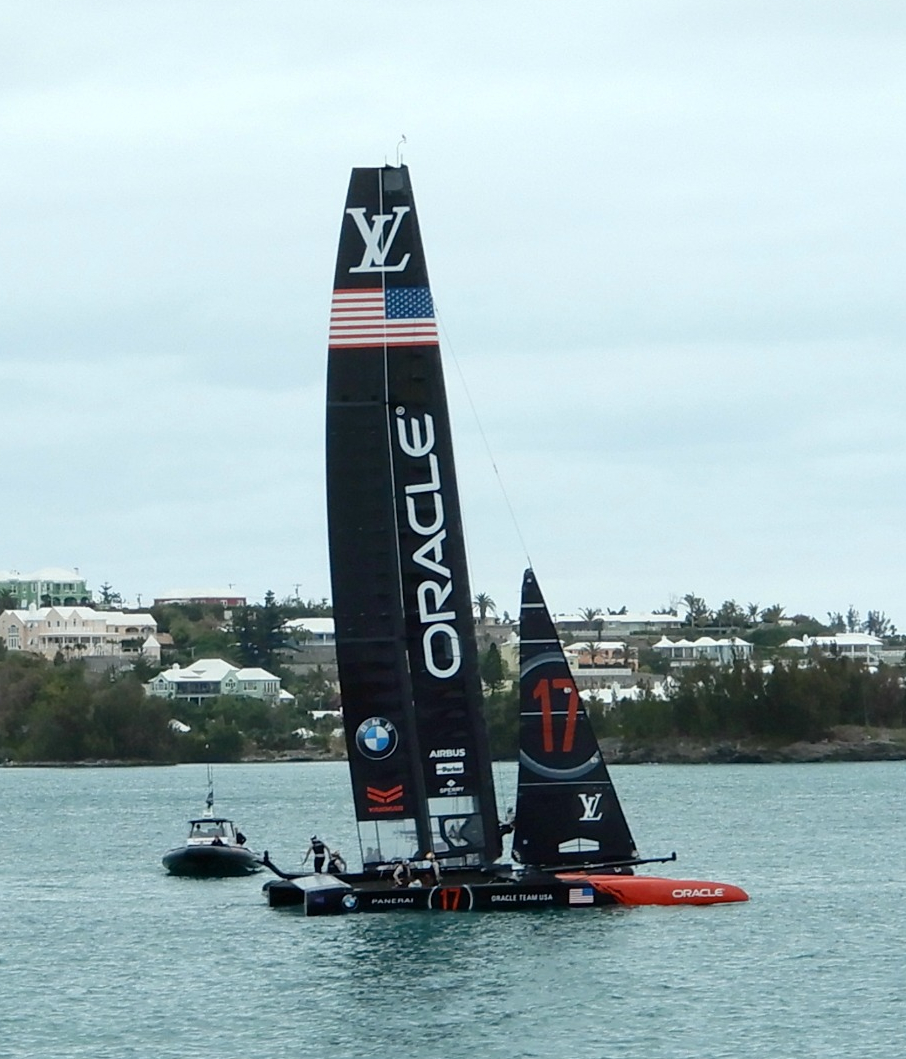
- America's Cup defender 17, 2017

Development
- Design: development class

Boat
- Crew: 6
- Draft: 2.40 m (7 ft 10 in)
- Air draft: 24.90 m (81 ft 8 in)

Hull
- Type: inshore racing catamaran
- Construction: carbonfiber
- Hull weight: 2,332–2,432 kg (5,141–5,362 lb)
- LOH: 15.00 m (49 ft 3 in)
- Beam: 8.47 m (27 ft 9 in)

Hull appendages
- General: • L-shaped daggerboards • T-shaped rudders
- Ballast: forbidden (solid or liquid)

Rig
- Rig type: wingsail sloop
- Mast height: 23.60 m (77 ft 5 in)

Sails
- Mainsail area: 100 m^{2} (1,100 sq ft) (wingsail)

The AC50 (defined in the America's Cup rules as AC Class yacht, or ACC) was a wingsail catamaran development rule that governed the construction of the yachts used in the 2017 Louis Vuitton Cup and the 2017 America's Cup. Like the larger AC72s used in the 2013 America's Cup, AC50s used L-shaped daggerboard stabilizers as well as T-shaped rudder elevators that were able to generate enough lift to allow the boats to exit displacement mode in winds in excess of 7kt. Prototype versions of crossbeams, wingsails, appendages, as well as steering and trimming systems had been tested by all syndicates on AC45 platforms as surrogate yachts before building their AC50. The class allowed hydraulic control of the wingsails and appendages. Motors and computer automation was banned in the class. Each challenger team was only allowed to build one AC50 for competition and only six boats were built. The class was replaced with the monohull AC75 after the 2017 America's Cup.

The class achieved a maximum peak speed of 47.2 knots (54.3 mph; 87.4 km/h) over the water, recorded by ACRM telemetry aboard Sweden's Magic Blue.

The 2017 America's Cup class winning boat, designed by a team led by Daniel Bernasconi and sailed by Team New Zealand, featured a distinct polyhedral daggerboard stabilizer and pedal-powered hydraulics to control its 24m high fixed-wing mainsail; four crew providing the power from cycling stations in each hull instead of grinding winches by hand.

The AC50 design was developed into the one design F50 class used for the SailGP competition.
