= Groupama Sailing Team =

French sailing team

Career
- Yacht club: Yacht Club de France
- Nation: France
- Skipper: Franck Cammas
- Notable victories: 2011–12 Volvo Ocean Race; 2013 Tour de France; 2013 Little Cup; 2015 Little Cup

Yachts
- Sail no.: Boat name
- Groupama 1, Groupama 2
- Groupama 3
- Groupama 34
- Groupama 70, Groupama 4
- Groupama 24
- Groupama 40
- Groupama C
- Groupama AC45
- GTF Test, GTF

Groupama Sailing Team is a French sailing team. Headed by skipper Franck Cammas, the team has won Volvo Ocean Race and Tour de France à la voile. They are also sailing in the 2017 America's Cup.
