= America's Cup World Series =

Match races used as heats for the 2013–17 America's Cup

- Sport: Sailing
- Founded: 2011
- Countries: USA, NZL, GBR, SWE, FRA, JPN
- Related competitions: America's Cup

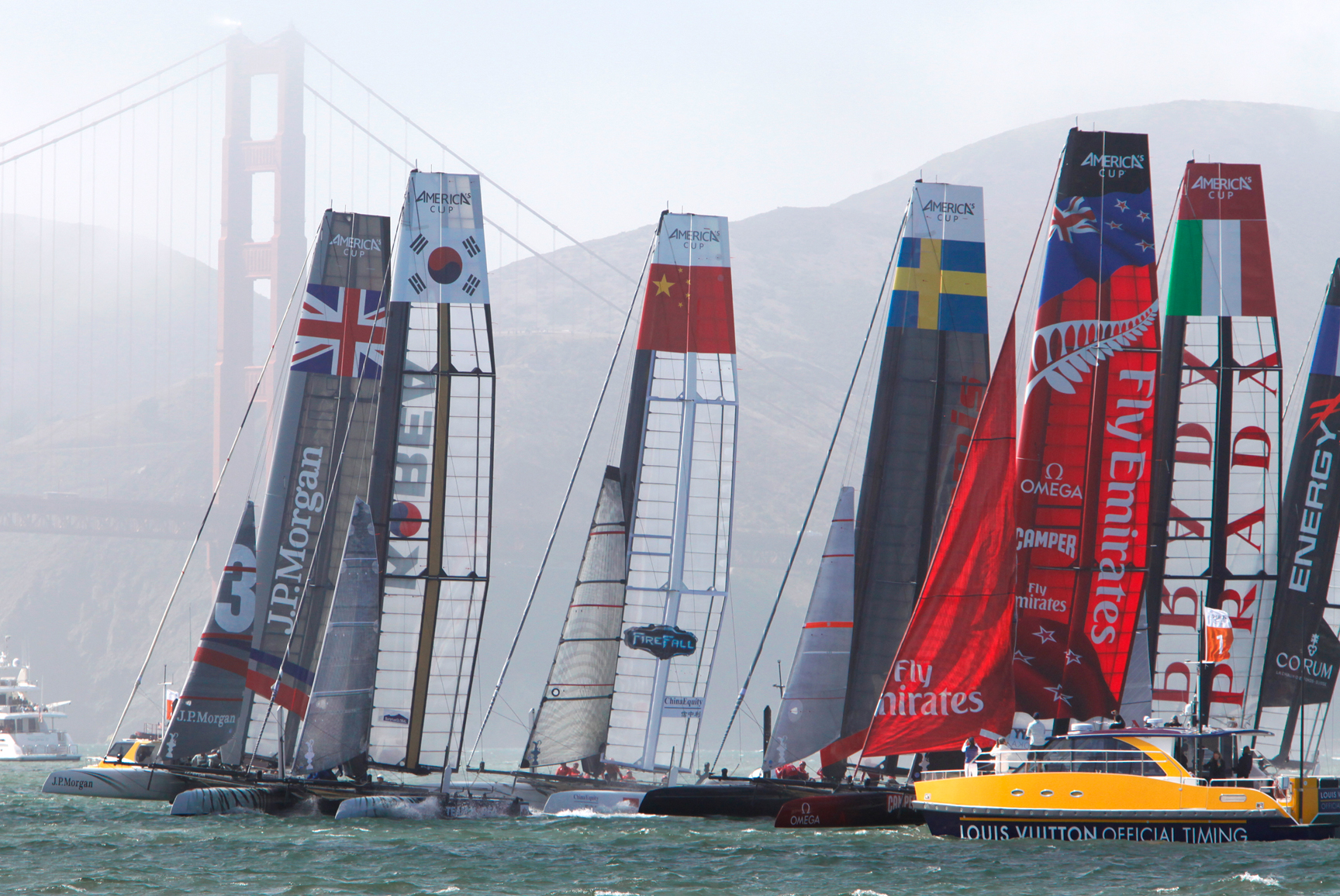
AC45s rounding the first mark in San Francisco, 2012

The America's Cup World Series are match races and fleet regattas used as heats for the 2013 America's Cup and the 2017 America's Cup.

== The Yachts ==
=== AC45 and AC45F ===
The World Series uses AC45 catamarans, a one-design wingsail catamaran designed specifically for the event by Oracle Racing. The AC45 was conceived as a smaller version of the larger AC72 class rule which was used for the 2013 America's Cup. In 2015, the class was modified to AC45F which incorporated hydrofoiling capability for improved performance, with boats achieving peak speeds of 37kt.

The AC45 has the following specifications:

- design: Mike Drummond & Oracle Racing
- builder: Core Builders Composites (NZ) & TP Cookson (NZ)
- build: honeycomb core, carbonfiber sandwich
- length: 13.45 m (44.1 ft)
- beam: 6.90 m (22.6 ft)
- weight: 1,290–1,320 kg (2,840–2,910 lb)
- maximum draught : 2.7 m (8 ft 10 in)
- air draught : 21.5 m (71 ft) without extension, 25.5 m (84 ft) with extension
- wing: 20 m (66 ft) 83.5 m^{2} (899 sq ft) wing element with three slotted flaps
- extension: 4 m (13 ft) high, 8.7 m^{2} (94 sq ft) area
- jib area: 48 m^{2} (520 sq ft), provided by sail loft of team's choice (2011–2013 series), provided by North Sails (2015–2016 series)
- gennaker area: 125 m^{2} (1,350 sq ft), provided by sail loft of team's choice (2011–2013 series), provided by North Sails (2015–2016 series)
- crew: 5 + 1 guest
- daggerboards: two conventional leeboards (2011–2013 series) with raking L-type elevators (2015–2016 series)
- rudders: two balanced spade rudders (2011–2013 series) with T-type horizontal stabilizers (2015–2016 series)

== Testing platform ==
The AC45 are authorized to be taken out of measurement to serve as a testing platform for the America's Cup. Oracle Racing released photographs of an AC45 hydrofoiling with L-type appendages on June 18, 2012, a premonition of Team New Zealand's larger foiling AC72 Aotearoa test boat first spotted in Auckland on August 29, 2012. In February 2015 Oracle Racing and Artemis Racing tested two AC45s modified by Core Builders; They featured L-type hydrofoils, horizontal rudder stabilizers, lengthened crossbeams (herego wide beam), a shortened jib-only bowsprit extending into a centerline pod under the wing, flaring topsides, closed transoms, opened hulls with deep cockpits for binnacles and wheels, replacing the tiller. The authorization does not permit to lengthen the hulls. All other teams carried out similar experiments with the platform.

== 2011–13 World Series ==
Nine events were held between 2011 and 2012 in the lead up to the 2013 America's Cup.

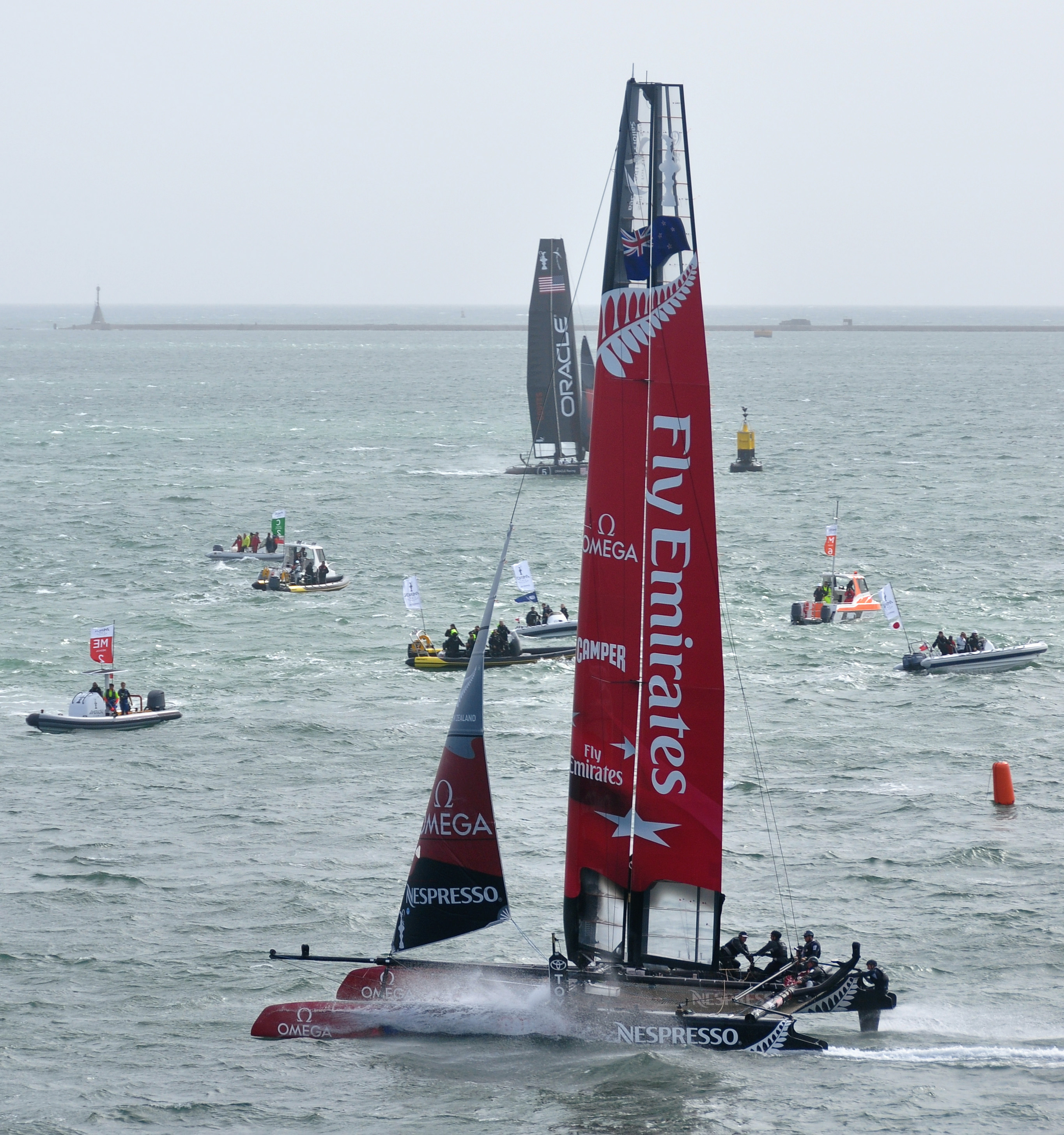
Team New Zealand's AC45 in September 2011

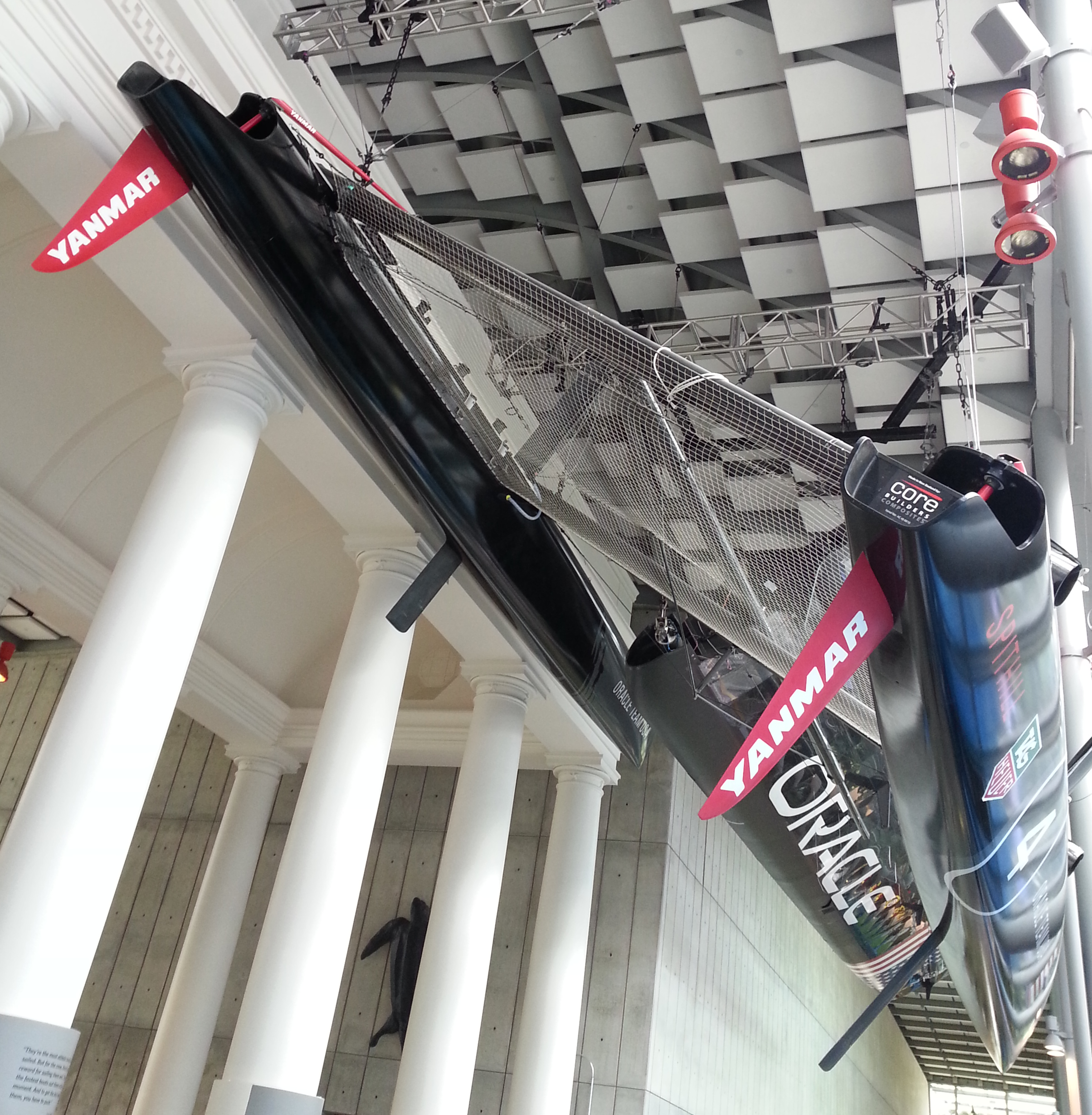
Oracle Racing 4 hulls exhibit in the California Academy of Sciences

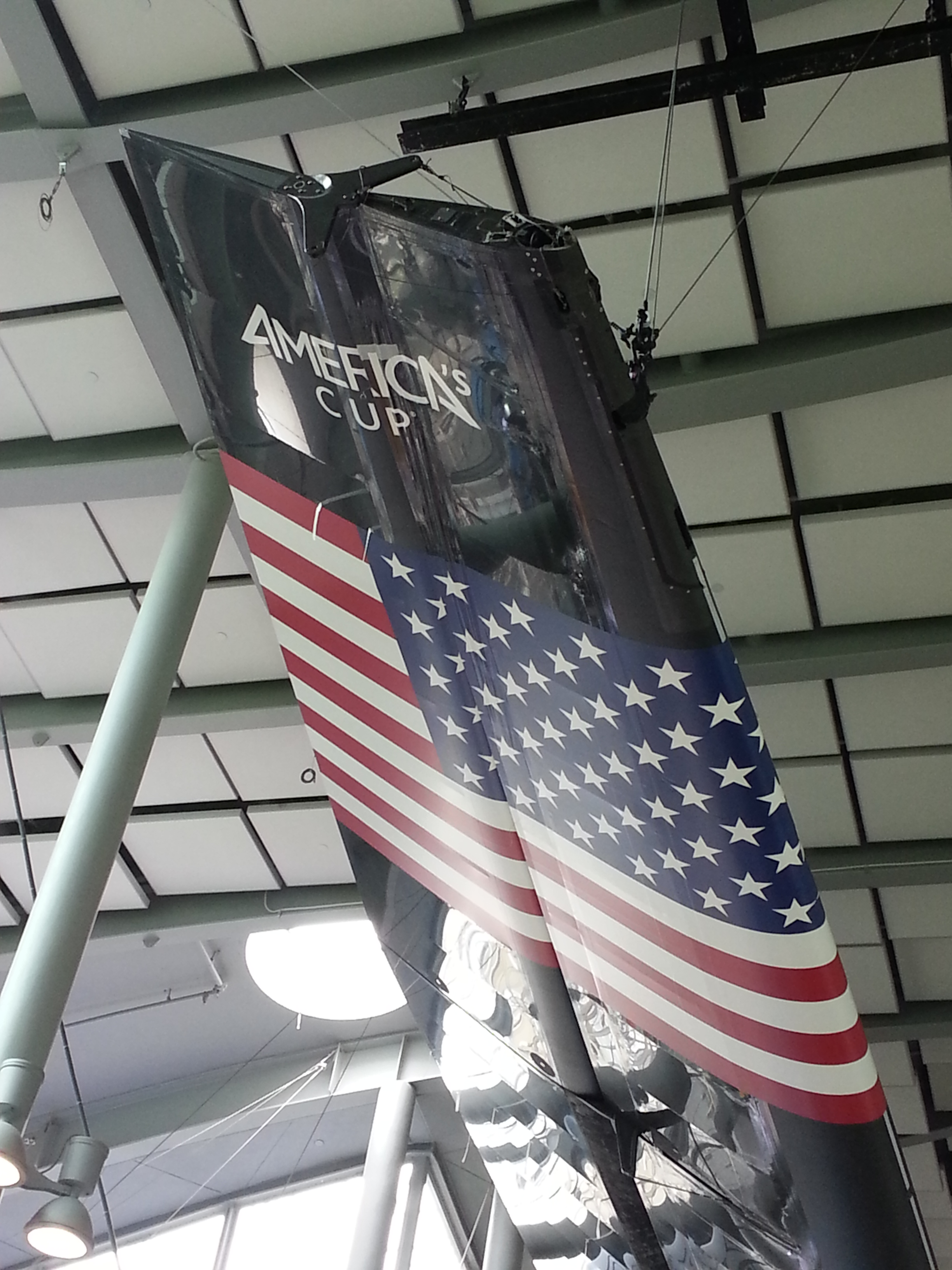
Oracle Racing 4 wing exhibit in the California Academy of Sciences

In August 2013, the competition jury received a report from Oracle Team USA that their boat and others they had loaned had unauthorized modifications. Since they were using one of these modified boats, the BAR team withdrew from the competition on 7 August 2013. Oracle Team USA withdrew the day after. Penalties imposed included expelling three team members, a $250,000 fine, and a one-point penalty for each of the first two races of the Match in which they would otherwise score a point.

== 2015–16 World Series ==
The series was revived as heats of nine two-day events in eight venues in the run up to the 2017 America's Cup. The races used a single boat design, known as AC45f, which was based on AC45 with added hydrofoil daggerboards and rudders.

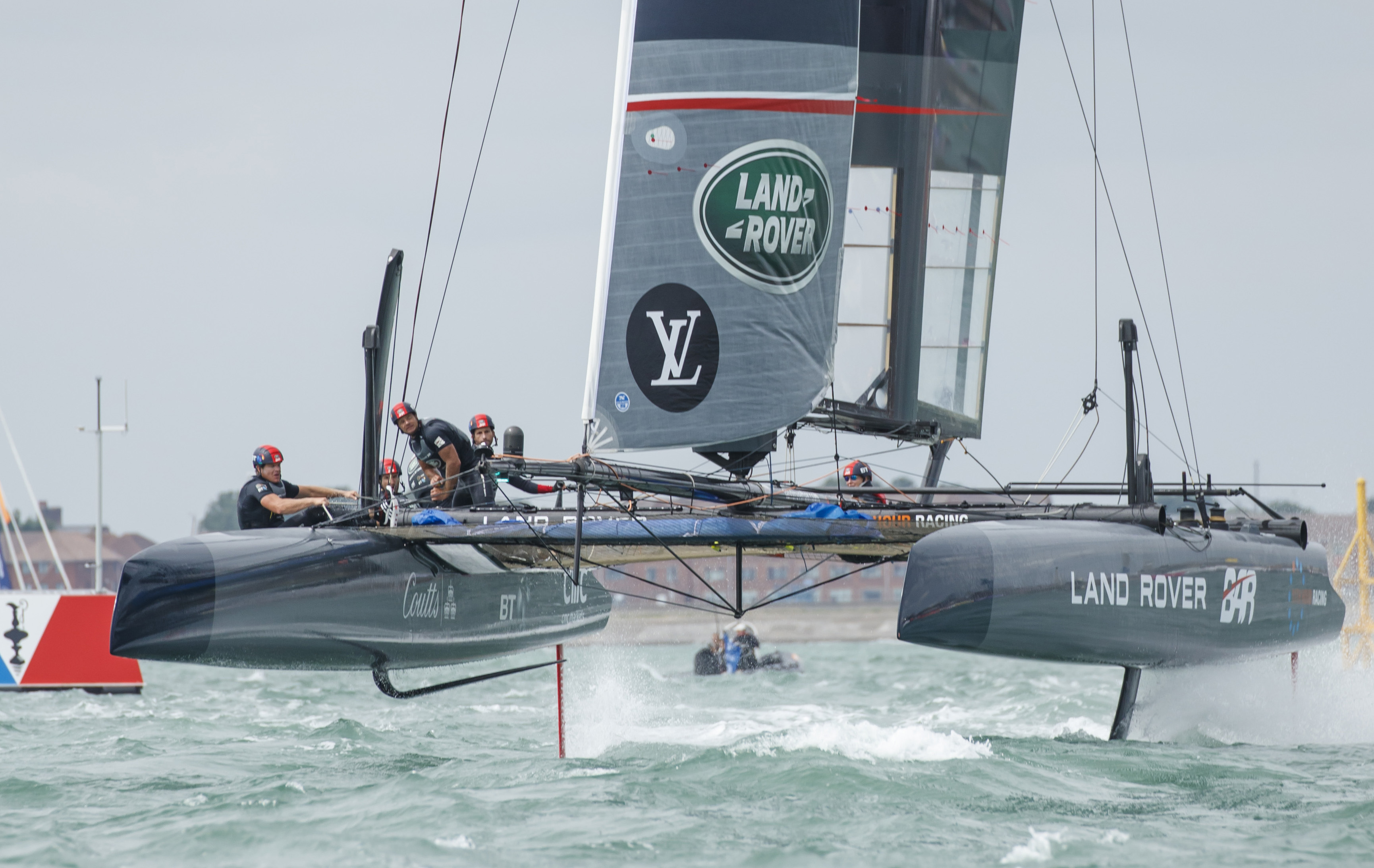
Land Rover BAR's AC45f sailing on hydrofoils with one daggerboard raised above the water.

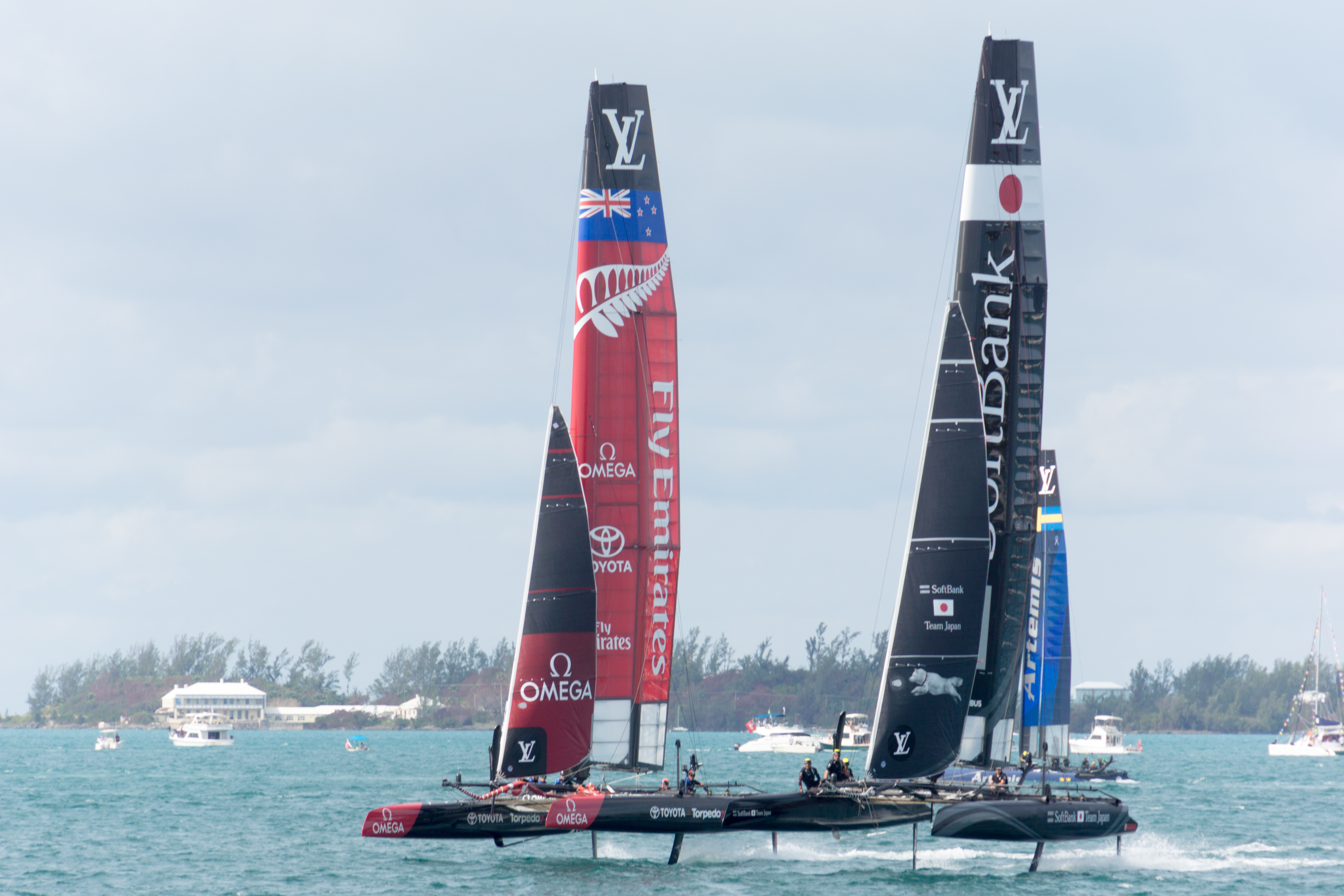
Hydrofoiling AC45Fs in 2015

The overall winner of the competition was Land Rover BAR, with Oracle Team USA being the runner up. The winner of the series earned two points and the runner-up received a single point in the new America's Cup Qualifiers. The boats are similar to the AC50 used in the 2017 America's Cup.

== Cancelled 2018 and 2020 World Series ==
Prior to the 2017 America's Cup, several of the competing syndicates (Note: Oracle Team USA, Land Rover BAR Team UK, Team France, Softbank Team Japan, Metro Artemis Team Sweden) signed an agreement to hold World Series prior to the next two America's Cups, then scheduled for 2019 and 2021. These two World Series would be used as selection series to determine which teams would compete at the 2019 and 2021 Louis Vuitton Cups Challenger Selection Series. These two seasons would have used the AC50-class yachts, instead of the AC45 or AC45F classes. However, the winner of the 35th America's Cup, Emirates Team New Zealand was not a signatory to the agreement for the 36th and 37th America's Cup, making these plans obsolete.
