= Jono Macbeth =

New Zealand yachtsman (b.1973)

Jonathon "Jono" Macbeth
- Born: March 26, 1973 (age 52); Castor Bay, Auckland, New Zealand
- Years active: 1997–2019

Jonathan "Jono" Macbeth (born 26 March 1973) is a former New Zealand professional yachtsman who has participated in 6 America's Cup campaigns and won 3.

Macbeth was born in Castor Bay, Auckland, New Zealand. He joined Team New Zealand in 1997 and remained with them for their 2003 and 2007 campaigns.

Macbeth joined the Sir Russell Coutts led American syndicate BMW Oracle Racing in 2008 and remained with them for their 2013 campaign.

Macbeth joined Sir Ben Ainslie's Land Rover BAR team in 2014 for their 2017 campaign.
