= Hamilton Island Yacht Club =

Yacht club in Queensland, Australia

Hamilton Island Yacht Club was established in 2009 by Bob Oatley. It is situated at Hamilton Island (Queensland) in Australia and provides services for recreational sailors.
