= 2017 America's Cup =

35th staging of the America's Cup yacht race

35th America's Cup
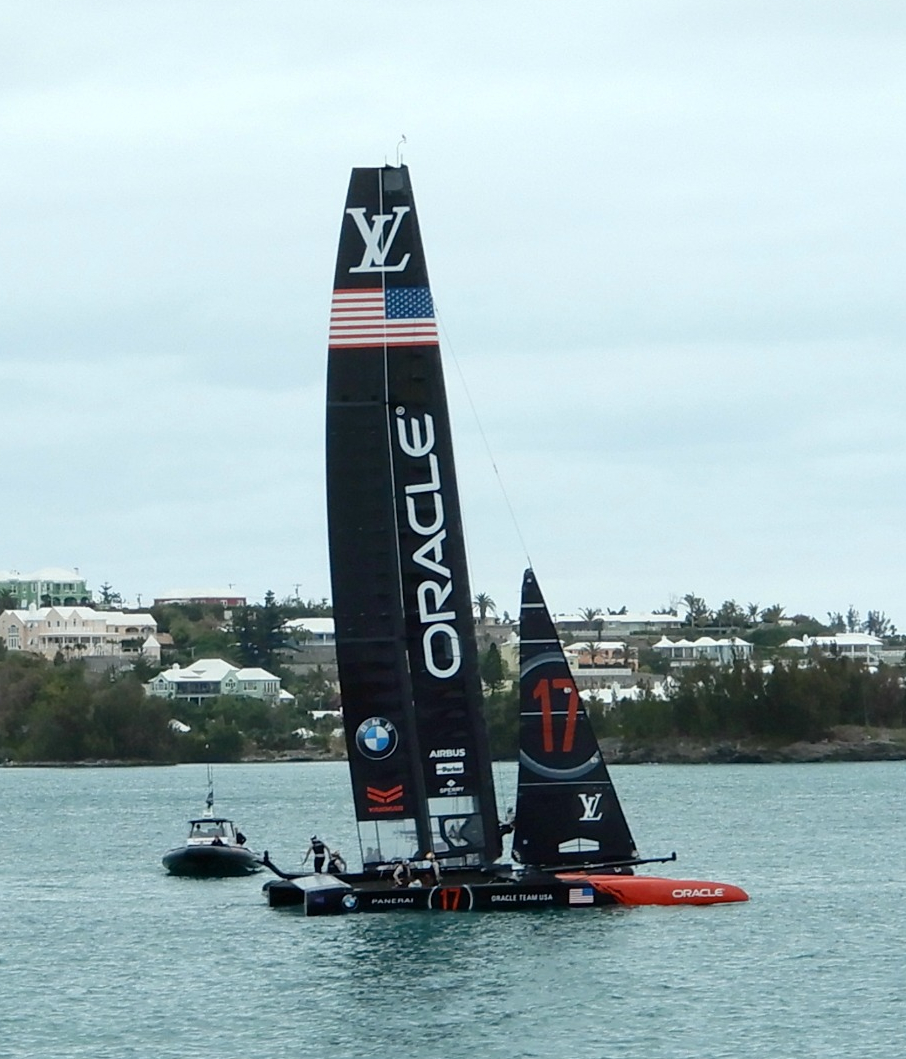
- The defending yacht, 17

Defender United States
- Defender club: Golden Gate Yacht Club
- Yacht: 17

Challenger New Zealand
- Challenger club: Royal New Zealand Yacht Squadron
- Yacht: Aotearoa

Competition
- Location: Great Sound, Bermuda
- Dates: 17–26 June 2017
- Rule: AC50
- Winner: Royal New Zealand Yacht Squadron
- Score: (United States) 1 (New Zealand) 7

The 2017 America's Cup was the 35th staging of the America's Cup yacht race. The challenger, Emirates Team New Zealand, won by a score of 7 to 1 over the defender, Oracle Team USA. It was held on the Great Sound in Bermuda from June 17 to June 26. The races were conducted using hydrofoiling AC50 America's Cup Class yachts, which are slightly larger than the AC45F yachts used in the 2015–16 America's Cup World Series.

It was Oracle's second defence of the America's Cup, four years after its first successful defence. Emirates Team New Zealand defended the cup in the 36th America's Cup. The format was changed since the last Cup, to the current best-of-13.

== Venue ==
The 2017 America's Cup course was on the Great Sound in Bermuda, the venue at the Royal Naval Dockyard.

In June 2014, media reported the venue of the 34th America's Cup, San Francisco, was no longer in consideration to host the 35th edition. San Diego, Chicago and Bermuda were listed as being still in the running. In July 2014, americascup.com reported that Chicago was dropped from the running, and finally on 2 December 2014, Bermuda was announced as the host of the 2017 America's Cup. The Premier of Bermuda, Michael Dunkley, welcomed the teams, sponsors, and spectators at a press conference in New York.

The financial package included in the bid by Bermuda was worth approximately US$77 million, including a $15 million sponsorship fee, $25 million for infrastructure improvements, $12 million operating costs and a $25 million guarantee against commercial sponsorships. Dr. Grant Gibbons, Bermuda's Minister for Economic Development, stated that the America's Cup had a possibility of generating revenue of up to US$250 million in Bermuda.

Security arrangements at the Dockyard were assumed by HM's Royal Bermuda Regiment after termination of contract between the local security provider and the AC35.

== Challenger of record ==
On 1 October 2013, Australia's Hamilton Island Yacht Club was confirmed as the "Challenger of Record" for the 35th America's Cup, after submitting their paperwork only moments after the win by Oracle Team USA. The HIYC challenge was accepted by the Golden Gate Yacht Club, who was the Defender and Trustee of the America's Cup. Australian businessman Bob Oatley, founder of Rosemount and owner of famed super maxi yacht Wild Oats XI, was confirmed to be the main financial backer of the Hamilton Island Yacht Club challenge.

On 19 July 2014 Russell Coutts, Director of the America's Cup Event Authority (ACEA), announced that the Hamilton Island Yacht club had withdrawn Team Australia from the 35th America's Cup. Team Australia claimed that the entry fee rules agreed to in the official protocol created too much risk due to the uncertainty of the then unknown venue and schedule of the event.

The Challenger of Record Committee (CORC) represents all of the challengers' interests and negotiates with Oracle over mutual concerns. Luna Rossa replaced HIYC as the challenger of record. In April 2015, Luna Rossa withdrew its challenge bid, pulling out of the 2017 America's Cup in protest at rule changes reducing the size of the boats.

== Rule changes ==
On 5 June 2014, it was announced that the regatta would be sailed in 62-foot-long (18.9 m) foiling catamarans, the AC62. The entry fee was $3 million. Each challenging team could build only one boat while Oracle Team USA could build two. A nationality rule was agreed, requiring 25 percent of the crew to be from the entry's country. This nationality rule had been lifted prior to the 2003 America's Cup. The rules specified the combined weight of the crew could not exceed 525 kg. The neutral International adjudicating yachting panel was dropped in favour of a three-man panel appointed by the defender.

In March 2015, the teams voted to reduce the size of the boats to the 45- to 50-foot range, leading to the withdrawal in protest of Luna Rossa. This in turn led to a joint statement from four teams attacking Team New Zealand which had supported Luna Rossa.

== Teams ==
The America's Cup was contested by its defender Oracle Team USA, who represent the Golden Gate Yacht Club. The challenger was Emirates Team New Zealand, for Royal New Zealand Yacht Squadron, who had defeated the other four challengers to win the Louis Vuitton America's Cup Challenger Playoffs trophy.

== Technical development ==
Teams were allowed to take one-design AC45s out of measurement by modifying crossbeams, wings and rudders, adding hydraulic systems, as well as produce a maximum of six custom daggerboards to test on the existing platform ahead of building their race boat. All teams took advantage of this opportunity: Oracle Racing modified three AC45s, selling their first development boat to SoftBank Team Japan as part of their technology-sharing agreement and subsequently conducted a two-boat testing program with their last two boats; Land Rover BAR modified three AC45s and conducted a two-boat testing program with their last two boats; Artemis Racing modified two AC45s and conducted a two-boat testing program with them. Groupama Team France, Luna Rossa and Emirates Team New Zealand modified one AC45 each. Luna Rossa later gifted their boat to Team New Zealand.

The winning Emirates Team New Zealand yacht design team, led by Technical Director Dan Bernasconi, also modified SL33 foiling wingsail catamarans to try new ideas for its race boat, in which they produced a number of distinct features absent from other boats in the fleet: two four-handed grinding pedestals on their development AC45 were replaced by four cycling stations; Peter Burling was the only helmsman to be relieved of daggerboard controls in order to focus on steering only; instead "cyclor" Blair Tuke undertook daggerboard deployment, trim and overall responsibility of pitch angle and ride height; Daggerboards were lengthier than those of other teams by virtue of a distinct dihedral bend in the middle of the hydrofoil tip.

The rise in foiling catamarans encouraged competing teams to enter into technical partnerships with companies specializing in aerospace technologies. Land Rover BAR allied with Red Bull Advanced Technologies, headed by ten-time Formula 1 World Constructor's Championship car designer Adrian Newey. Oracle Team USA entered a technical partnership with Airbus. Artemis Racing allied with high performance engineering giant Cosworth. Luna Rossa Challenge had partnered with Lenovo to analyze and predict race simulations, assisting in the design of their boat.

== Qualifying events ==
The America's Cup World Series was won by Land Rover BAR, earning two points to take into the 2017 Louis Vuitton America's Cup Qualifiers Round. The runner up was Oracle Team USA, earning one point to take into the Qualifiers Round.

Oracle Team USA won the 2017 Louis Vuitton America's Cup Qualifiers Round, earning one point to take into the 2017 America's Cup competition. Emirates Team New Zealand, Land Rover BAR, Artemis Racing and SoftBank Team Japan advanced from the 2017 Louis Vuitton America's Cup Qualifiers Round to the Challenger Playoffs Semi-finals, while Groupama Team France was eliminated from further competition.

Emirates Team New Zealand eliminated Land Rover BAR in the 2017 Louis Vuitton America's Cup Challenger Playoffs Semi-finals, advancing to the Challenger Playoffs against Artemis Racing who had eliminated SoftBank Team Japan in the other semi-final.

Emirates Team New Zealand won the 2017 Louis Vuitton America's Cup Challenger Playoffs Final against Artemis, 5–2, advancing to face Oracle Team USA in the 2017 America's Cup.

== Cup match ==
Races were held from 17 June. The first team to seven points wins and becomes the Defender of the America's Cup. Due to Oracle Team USA's win in the America's Cup Qualifiers, Emirates Team New Zealand started the match with a score of −1.

Wins marked in green

Date	(United States) Oracle Team USA	Emirates Team New Zealand	Delta	Score	
Date	(United States) Oracle Team USA	Emirates Team New Zealand	Delta	(United States)	(New Zealand)
pre-match	qualifiers' champion			0	−1
17 June	21'37.697"	21'07.495"	00'30.202"	0	0
17 June	23'08.208"	21'40.662"	01'27.546"	0	1
18 June	20'02.219"	19'13.434"	00'48.785"	0	2
18 June	22'26.887"	21'15.216"	01'11.671"	0	3
24 June	22'38.055"	20'33.942"	02'04.113"	0	4
24 June	20'47.878"	20'59.180"	00'11.302"	1	4
25 June	20'35.000"	20'23.324"	00'11.676"	1	5
25 June	19'43.585"	19'13.593"	00'29.992"	1	6
26 June	22'18.190"	21'23.776"	00'54.414"	1	7

The first race of the day is scheduled each time at 2:00 pm ADT. The race data were published on the official noticeboard.
