= Sir James Bell, 1st Baronet =

Scottish shipping owner and coal-exporter (1850 – 1929)

- Born: 1850
- Died: 1929

Sir James Bell, 1st Baronet, DL JP (1850 – 1929) was a Scottish shipping owner and coal-exporter who served as Lord Provost of Glasgow from 1892 to 1896.

== Life ==
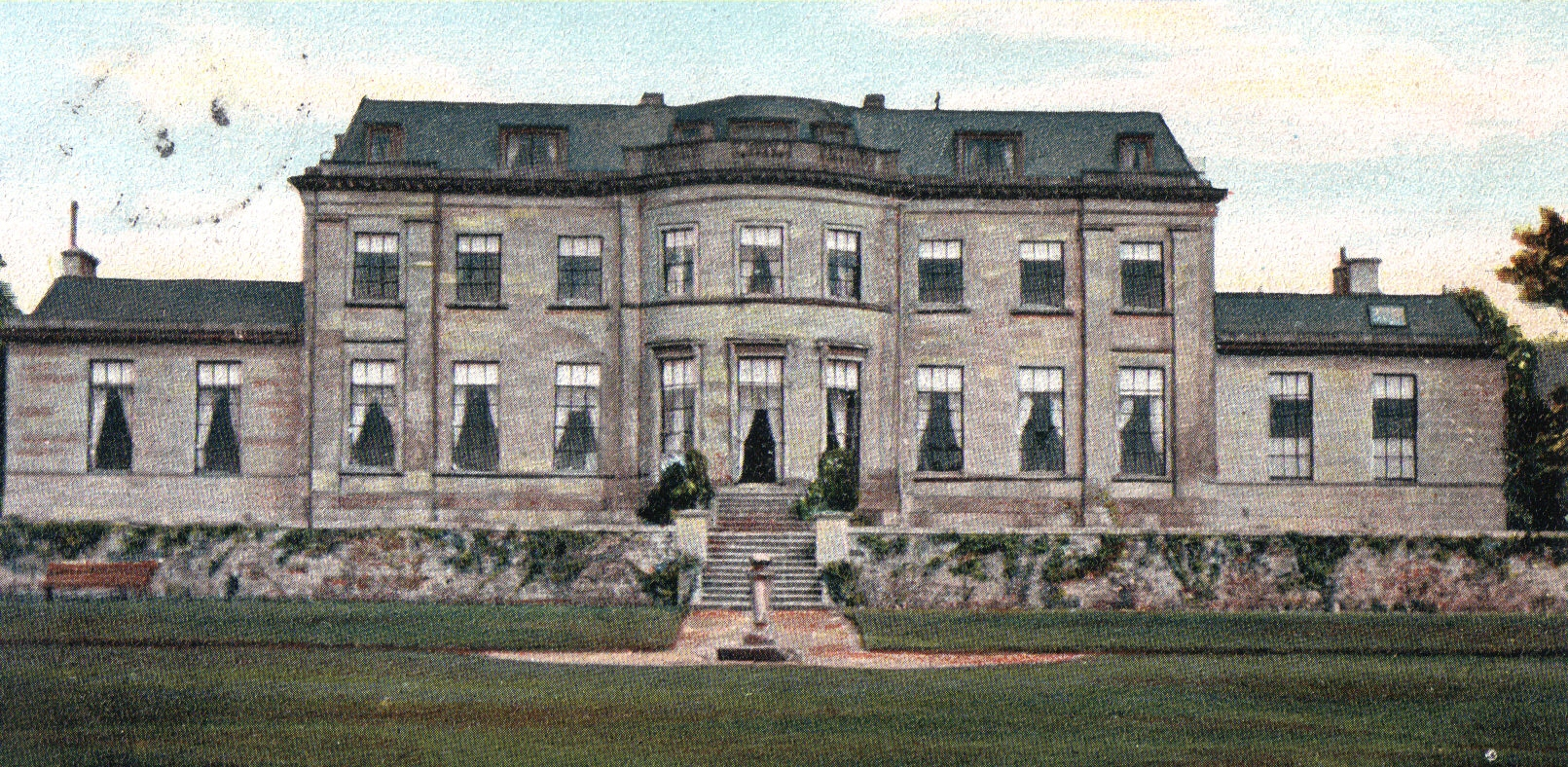
Montgreenan House

He was born in Glasgow on 16 January 1850, the son of John Bell, a collector of customs. In 1890 he lived at 7 Marlborough Terrace in Glasgow.

He was a senior partner of Bell Brothers & McLelland, shipowners, usually using D & W Henderson Ltd as their builder, mainly using the Meadowside shipyard.

Bell served as Lord Provost of Glasgow from 1892 to 1896. In his role as Lord Provost he was most notable for adding electricity to the city streets, officially switching on the first street lights in 1893. He also improved the city sewage treatment and organised a new park, now known as Bellahouston Park. For his service, he was created a baronet as "Baronet of Marlborough Terrace" by Queen Victoria in 1895.

He served as Honorary Colonel of the 1st Lanarkshire Rifle Volunteers from 7 October 1893 to 3 December 1902.

In 1905 he lived at Montgreenan House near Kilwinning.

He died at Montgreenan in 1929.

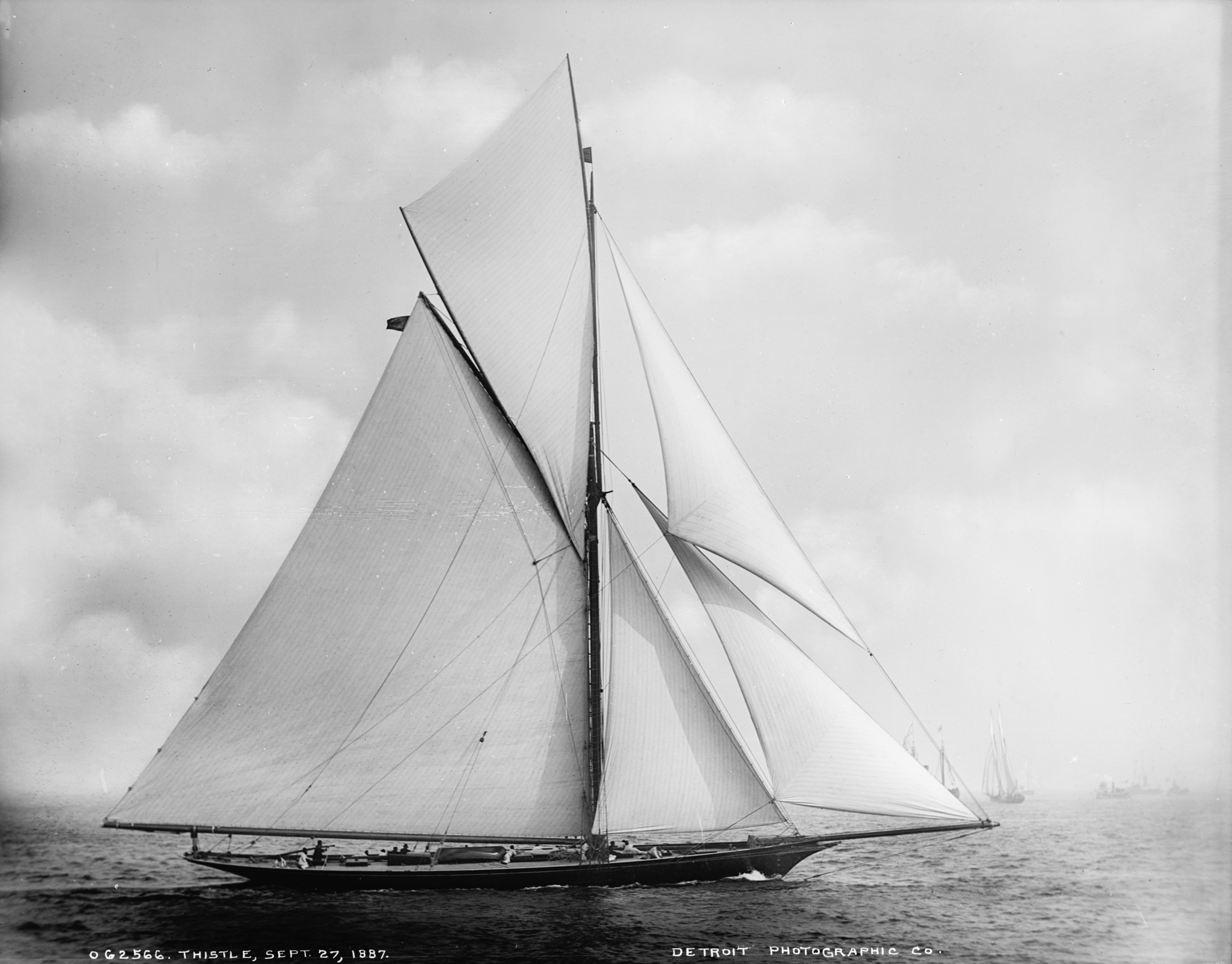
Bell's yacht "Thistle"

== Yachting ==
A serious yachtsman he entered the America's Cup in 1887 with his yacht "Thistle" but was unsuccessful.

The yacht was designed by George Lennox Watson and built by D & W Henderson in the winter of 1886/7. The ship was captained by John and Charlie Barr. It lost out to the American yacht "Volunteer". It was then returned to Europe and sold to Kaiser Wilhelm II for personal use under the name "Meteor". It was broken up in 1921.

He was Vice Commodore of the Royal Clyde Yacht Club.

== Family ==
His wife, Helen Findlay of Hallhill, died in 1909.

Their son was killed at the Battle of Bakenlaagte in the Boer War.

Their son John Bell (1876-1943) became 2nd Baronet of Marlborough Terrace in 1929 on his father's death.

== Artistic recognition ==
He was portrayed in office by Hubert von Herkomer.

Baronetage of the United Kingdom
New creation	Baronet (of Marlborough Place); 1895–1929	Succeeded by John Bell
