= Vorovsky (ship) =

Soviet naval ship originally Gordon Bennett's yacht

History

United States
- Name: Lysistrata
- Namesake: Eponymous heroine of Lysistrata
- Owner: James Gordon Bennett Jr.
- Builder: William Denny & Brothers Ltd., Dumbarton
- Cost: £111,883 (equivalent to £11,889,797 in 2025)
- Laid down: 1899
- Launched: 27 August 1900
- In service: 1 March 1901
- Out of service: 22 June 1916
- Fate: Sold to the Naval Ministry of the Russian Empire

Russian Empire → Russian Republic
- Name: Yaroslavna
- Namesake: Euphrosyne Yaroslavna
- Operator: Arctic Ocean Flotilla
- Acquired: 22 June [O.S. 9 June] 1916
- Commissioned: 4 July [O.S. 21 June] 1916
- Decommissioned: 26 February 1918
- Reclassified: Dispatch vessel, 4 July [O.S. 21 June] 1916
- Fate: Joined the Red Fleet

Soviet Russia
- Name: Yaroslavna
- Operator: Arctic Ocean Flotilla
- Commissioned: 26 February 1918
- Captured: North Russian Expeditionary Force, 14 August 1918
- Fate: Transferred to the White movement

Severnyy Krai
- Name: Yaroslavna
- Operator: Arctic Ocean Flotilla
- Commissioned: 31 August 1918
- Abandoned: 20 February 1920
- Fate: Recovered by Reds, 5 April 1920

Russian SFSR
- Name: Yaroslavna
- Operator: Naval Forces of the North Sea
- Recommissioned: 26 June 1920
- Decommissioned: 2 January 1923
- Reclassified: Minelaying cruiser, 26 June 1920; Dispatch vessel, March 1921
- Fate: Transferred to the Soviet Border Guard

Soviet Union
- Name: Yaroslavna
- Operator: Soviet Border Guard
- Commissioned: 2 January 1923
- Decommissioned: 24 November 1923
- Fate: Returned to the Soviet Navy

Soviet Union
- Name: Yaroslavna
- Operator: Naval Forces of the Far East
- Acquired: 24 November 1923
- Commissioned: 20 November 1924
- Decommissioned: June 1925
- Renamed: Vorovskiy, 21 January 1924
- Fate: Transferred to the Soviet Border Troops

→ Soviet Union
- Name: Vorovskiy
- Namesake: Vatslav Vorovsky
- Operator: Soviet Border Troops
- Commissioned: June 1925
- Decommissioned: 1955 or 1959
- Renamed: PKZ-102, 31 March 1955
- Reclassified: Border patrol ship, June 1925; Barracks ship, 1955
- Fate: Transferred to the Soviet Navy

Soviet Union
- Name: PKZ-102
- Operator: Pacific Fleet
- Commissioned: 1955 or 1959
- Decommissioned: 1961
- Fate: Scrapped in 1966

General characteristics
- Type: Steam yacht
- Displacement: 2,800 long tons (3,140 short tons; 2,840 tonnes) as built; 3,315 tonnes (3,263 long tons; 3,654 short tons) during WWI; 3,744 tonnes (3,685 long tons; 4,127 short tons) during WWII
- Length: 314 ft (95.7 m) as built; 96.6 m (316 ft 11 in) during WWI; 96.3 m (315 ft 11 in) during WWII
- Beam: 40 ft (12.2 m)
- Draught: 5.5 m (18 ft 1 in) during WWI; 6.02 m (19 ft 9 in) during WWII
- Installed power: 2 × 3,250 ihp (3,300 metric horsepower) as built; 2 × 3,500 metric horsepower (3,450 ihp) during WWI and WWII
- Propulsion: 4 × Scotch marine boilers (steam pressure of 11.5 kg_{f}/cm^{2} or 164 psi; steam generation of 3,240 kg/h or 7,100 lb/h) (Note: One of the steam boilers (one of the two in the forward fire room) was removed during the refitting in 1944–1948.); 2 × triple-expansion vertical steam engines; 2 × shafts; 3-blade propellers with a diameter of 2.8 m (9.2 ft)
- Speed: 19.2 knots (35.6 km/h; 22.1 mph) as built; 18 knots (33 km/h; 21 mph) during WWI; 11.3 knots (20.9 km/h; 13.0 mph) for 7 days or 10 knots (19 km/h; 12 mph) for 9 days during WWII
- Range: 1,850 nautical miles (3,430 km; 2,130 mi) at 11.3 kn during WWII; 2,150 nautical miles (3,980 km; 2,470 mi) at 10 kn during WWII
- Capacity: 70 guests as a yacht
- Troops: 1,500 as a warship
- Complement: 116 during WWI; 137 during WWII
- Crew: 100 as built
- Armament: WWI era: 2 × 120 mm (4.7 in)/45-caliber guns; 2 × 47 mm (1.9 in)/43-caliber guns; 2 × 7.62 mm machine guns; WWII era: 2 × 102 mm (4 in)/60-caliber guns; 4 → 6 × 45 mm (1.8 in)/46-caliber guns; 1 × quadruple 7.62 mm machine gun mount, later 1 or 2 × 12.7 mm machine guns; 2 × depth charge racks, 56 × 41 kg (90 lb) depth charges; Post-WWII era: 2 × 85 mm (3.3 in)/52-caliber guns; 6 × 45 mm/68-caliber guns; 4 × 12.7 mm machine guns

Vorovskiy (also transliterated as Vorovsky, Russian: Воровский) was a Soviet naval ship, originally built as an American steam yacht. Throughout most of her active career, she served as a border patrol ship of the Soviet Border Troops.

Beyond her naval service, the vessel is notable for transporting the first Soviet military aid shipment and military advisers intended for the Whampoa Military Academy, established by the Grand Marshal's Headquarters of the Republic of China, in 1924. As a result, the ship occupies a notable place in the history of modern China.

== History ==
The vessel was originally built as a private yacht ordered by American millionaire and newspaper publisher James Gordon Bennett Jr., owner of the New York Herald, from William Denny and Brothers Limited in Dumbarton, Scotland. The yacht was designed by George Lennox Watson. She was named Lysistrata, after the eponymous heroine of an ancient Greek comedy by Aristophanes. Because the vessel was intended for leisure cruising, she contained a number of unusual facilities, including Turkish baths, a theater, and even special stalls for dairy cows to provide fresh milk for passengers.

In 1916, the Imperial Russian government purchased the vessel. She was converted into a dispatch vessel and renamed Yaroslavna (Russian: Ярославна). Assigned to the Arctic Ocean Flotilla, she was armed with two 120 mm (4.7 in)/45-caliber Pattern 1892 naval guns, two 47 mm (1.9 in)/43-caliber Hotchkiss guns, two 7.62 mm Maxim machine guns.

The vessel was captured by the British troops of the North Russian Expeditionary Force on 14 August 1918 during the Russian Civil War. Then Yaroslavna was transferred to the Supreme Administration of the Northern Region and assigned to the Whites' Arctic Ocean Flotilla based at Arkhangelsk on 31 August 1918. On 19 February 1920, the Provisional Government of the Northern Region fled toward Tromsø, Norway, intending to proceed to Murmansk under tow by the icebreaker Kozma Minin (Russian: Козьма Минин). Shortly after leaving Arkhangelsk, however, the vessel became trapped in heavy sea ice. The icebreaker eventually took aboard approximately 1,100 people, together with coal and provisions, and departed, leaving the vessel abandoned in the Arctic ice on 20 February 1920. The icebreaker Kanada (Russian: Канада, lit. 'Canada'), which had sided with the Reds, later recovered the ship near Morzhovets Island and towed her to Arkhangelsk on 5 April 1920. On 26 June 1920, Yaroslavna was assigned to the Soviet Naval Forces of the North Sea as a minelaying cruiser, but she was reclassified back as a dispatch vessel in March 1921.

Between 2 January and 24 November 1923, Yaroslavna was assigned to the Northern Border Flotilla of the Soviet Border Guard, and subsequently returned to the Soviet Navy. The vessel was put into repair at the Krasnaya Kuznitsa shipyard in Arkhangelsk to prepare for her repositioning to the Soviet Far East. On 21 January 1924, she was renamed in honor of Soviet diplomat Vatslav Vorovsky, who had been assassinated by a Russian White émigré in Lausanne on 10 May 1923 while attending the Lausanne Conference of 1922–1923.

Her first commander under the new name was former Imperial Russian Navy Vitse-Admiral Andrei Semyonovich Maximov (Russian: Андрей Семёнович Максимов), while her political commissar was Pyotr Ivanovich Smirnov-Svetlovsky (Russian: Пётр Иванович Смирнов-Светловский).

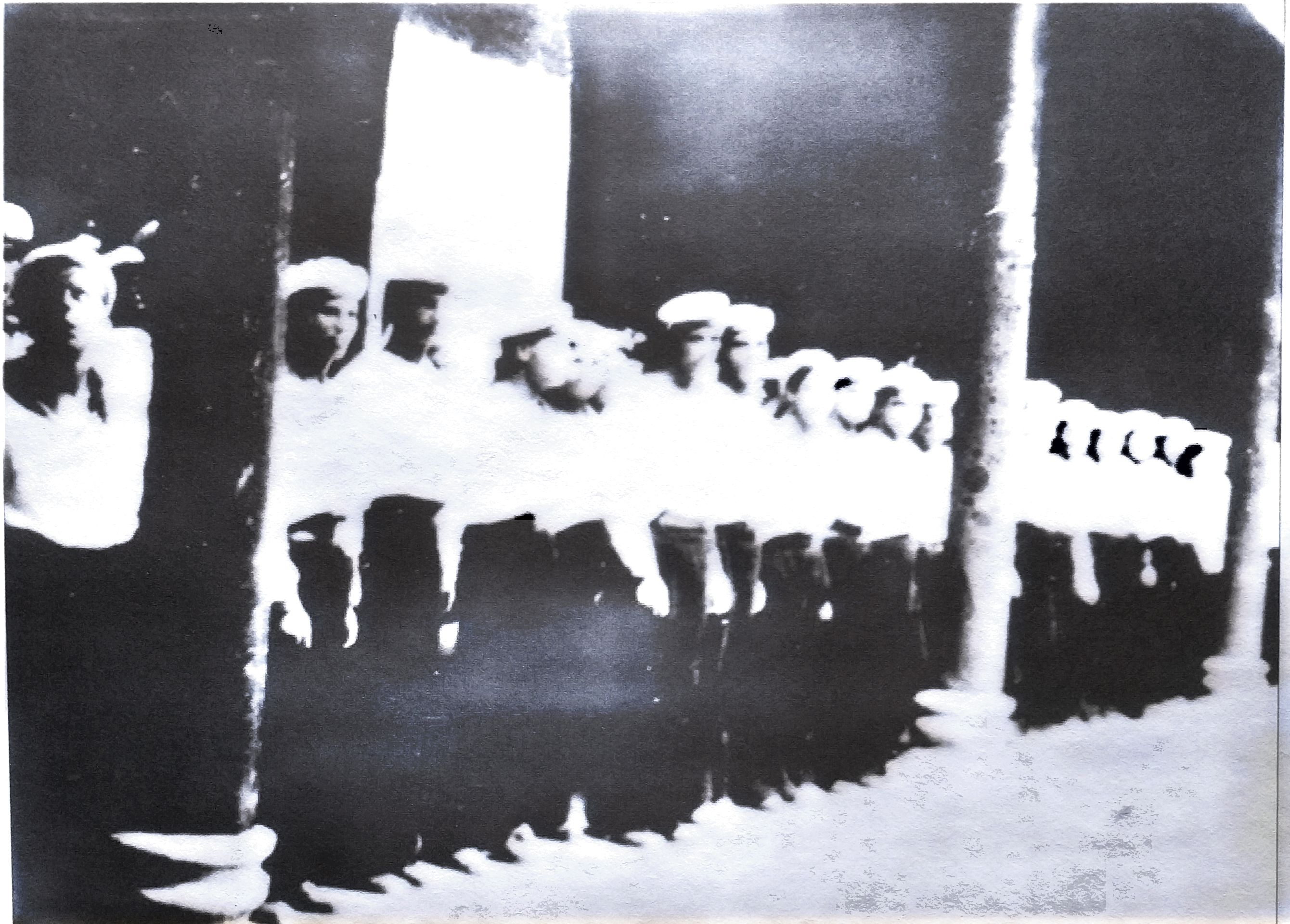
In early October 1924, the Soviet warship Vorovskiy delivered 8,000 Russian-made rifles to Guangzhou. Shown are Soviet sailors and cadets of the Whampoa Military Academy

On 12 July 1924, Vorovskiy undertook what was officially the first long-distance ocean voyage by a Soviet naval vessel, sailing from Arkhangelsk to Vladivostok. During this voyage she also carried out a secret mission: transporting military aid and advisers, including Vasily Blyukher, who were intended for the Grand Marshal's Headquarters in Guangzhou.

On 7 October 1924, Vorovskiy departed Victoria Harbour, Hong Kong, sailed northward along the coast of Guangdong, deliberately lingered in the Lingdingyang area, then suddenly turned and entered the waters of Humen, proceeding up the Pearl River toward Guangzhou. On the evening of 8 October she arrived at Shajiao Village. On the morning of 9 October, cadets and personnel of the Whampoa Military Academy boarded the vessel to unload military supplies. The unloading operation was completed by 5:00 p.m.

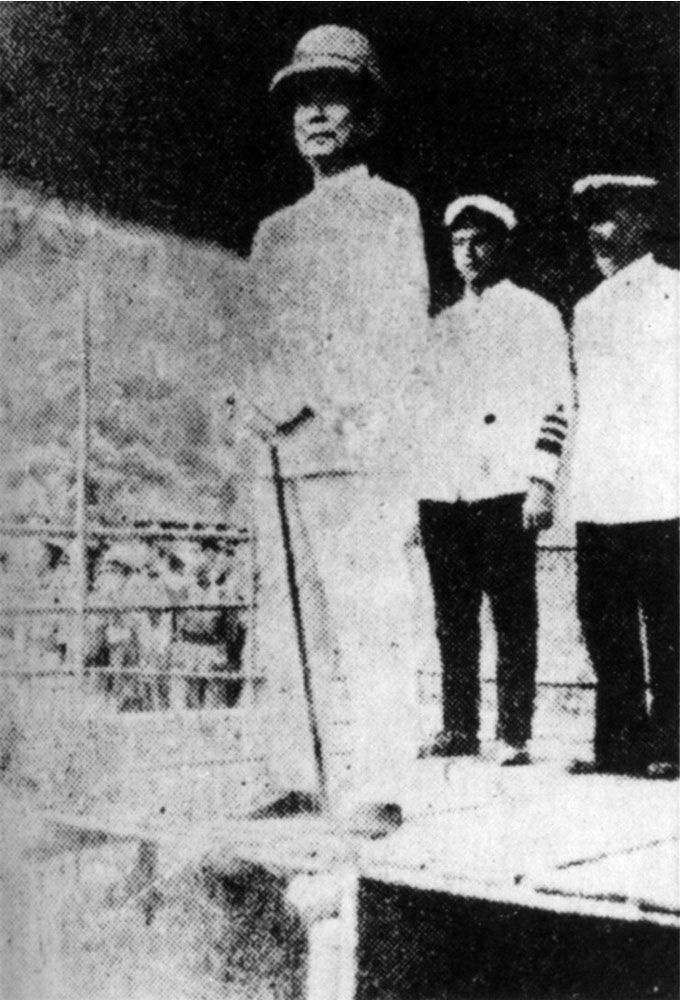
Sun Yat-sen meeting Andrei Maximov, the commander of the Soviet ship Vorovskiy, in Shaoguan on 10 October 1924

The shipment included 8,000 Mosin–Nagant rifles, 4 million rounds of ammunition, and 40 Soviet military advisers assigned to the Whampoa Military Academy. On 11 November, Vorovskiy departed Guangzhou and continued northward. Upon arriving at Vladivostok on 20 November 1924, she was assigned to the Soviet Naval Forces of the Far East. In June 1925, the vessel was transferred to the Far Eastern Maritime Border Guard of the OGPU Border Troops.

In 1931, Kliment Voroshilov inspected the vessel in Primorsky Krai. In 1932, she transported border troops to Ptichy Island to address encroachments by Japanese fishermen. Prior to World War II and until 1943, she repeatedly transported border troops and supplies to Chukotka Autonomous Okrug, Kamchatka, and the Commander Islands. From 1925 to 1943, Vorovskiy seized about 40 Japanese vessels for violating the state border and poaching marine biological resources in Soviet territorial waters.

At this time, the vessel was armed with two 102 mm (4 in)/60-caliber Pattern 1911 naval guns, four—later six—45 mm (1.8 in)/46-caliber 21-K dual-purpose guns, and one or two 12.7 mm DShK machine guns (previously a quadruple 7.62 mm M-4 anti-aircraft machine gun mount) mounted on the upper deck. She carried 56 M-1 depth charges, including a total of eight in two depth charge racks. The vessel was not equipped with mines or torpedoes. Minesweeping equipment included four K-1-type paravanes. Twenty 43–45-kilogram (95–99 lb) MDSh smoke drums were available for laying smoke screens.

Communications and surveillance equipment included a Bukhta (Russian: Бухта) radio transmitter, TM-7, PR-4, KUB-4M, and 5-RKU radio receivers, a Reid (Russian: Рейд) radio station, and a Gradus-K (Russian: Градус-К) radio direction finder. Optical equipment included a stereoscopic rangefinder with a 3-metre (9.8 ft) baseline, two BI and one BST periscope binoculars, two 7×50 binoculars, a fixed MSPL signal searchlight and two hand-held signal lamps, two Very pistols, two sets of signal flags, and an EMPE-02 searchlight. Two main-battery guns were additionally fitted with dial sights (panoramic telescopes) for engaging ground targets.

After two decades of service, the vessel underwent refitting in Vladivostok from 1944 to 1948. She received two more modern 85 mm (3.3 in)/52-caliber 90-K dual-purpose guns, six 45 mm/68-caliber 21-KM dual-purpose guns, and four 12.7 mm DShK machine guns.

On 23 September 1952, during a storm at the entrance to Avacha Bay, the vessel ran aground and suffered a large hole in her hull. She entered port the following morning. On 17 July 1953, escorted by the Soviet border patrol ship Dzerzhinskiy (Russian: Дзержинский), she returned to Vladivostok for repairs. This proved to be her final voyage.

In 1955, the vessel was reclassified as a barracks ship and renamed PKZ-102 (Russian: ПКЗ-102). That same year (or 1959, according to other sources), she was decommissioned from the Soviet Border Troops and transferred to the Pacific Fleet, where she served as the headquarters for an auxiliary naval formation until 1961. PKZ-102 was decommissioned by the Soviet Navy in 1961 and broken up for scrap in 1966.

== See also ==
- Russian frigate Vorovskiy
