= D. and W. Henderson and Company =

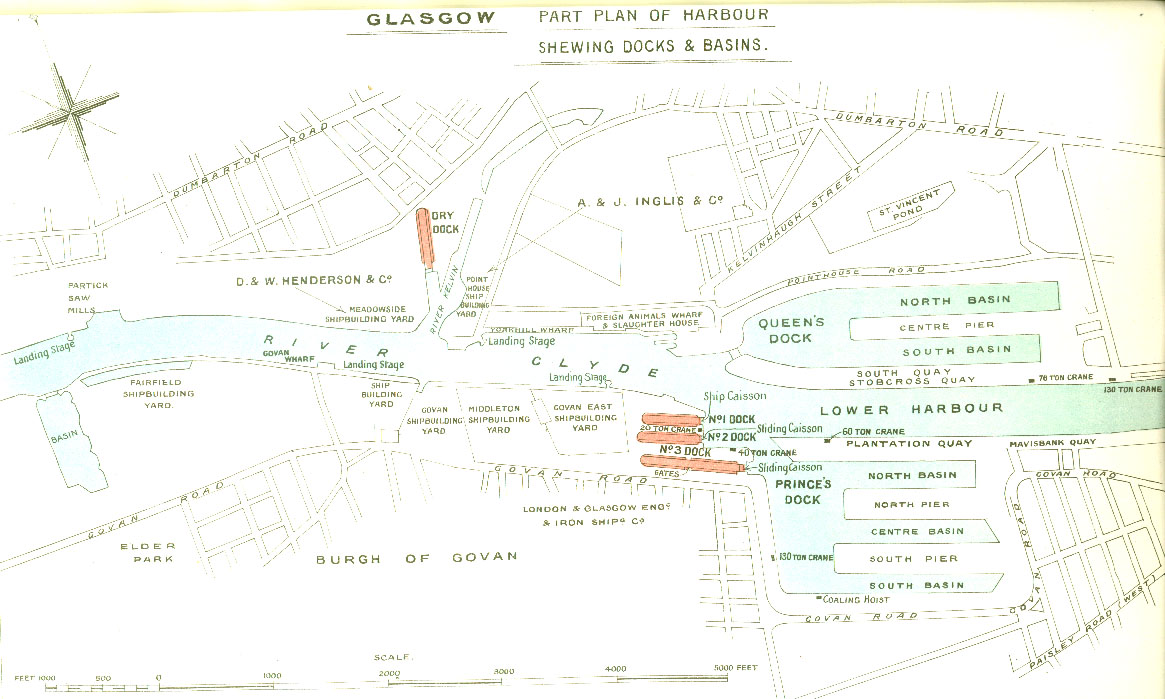
Map of the Glasgow docks in 1909 showing D & W Henderson & Co

David & William Henderson and Company was a Scottish marine engineering and shipbuilding company, based on Clydeside. It was founded in 1872 and traded until 1936 . Its shipyard was on the north bank of the River Clyde at its confluence with the River Kelvin.

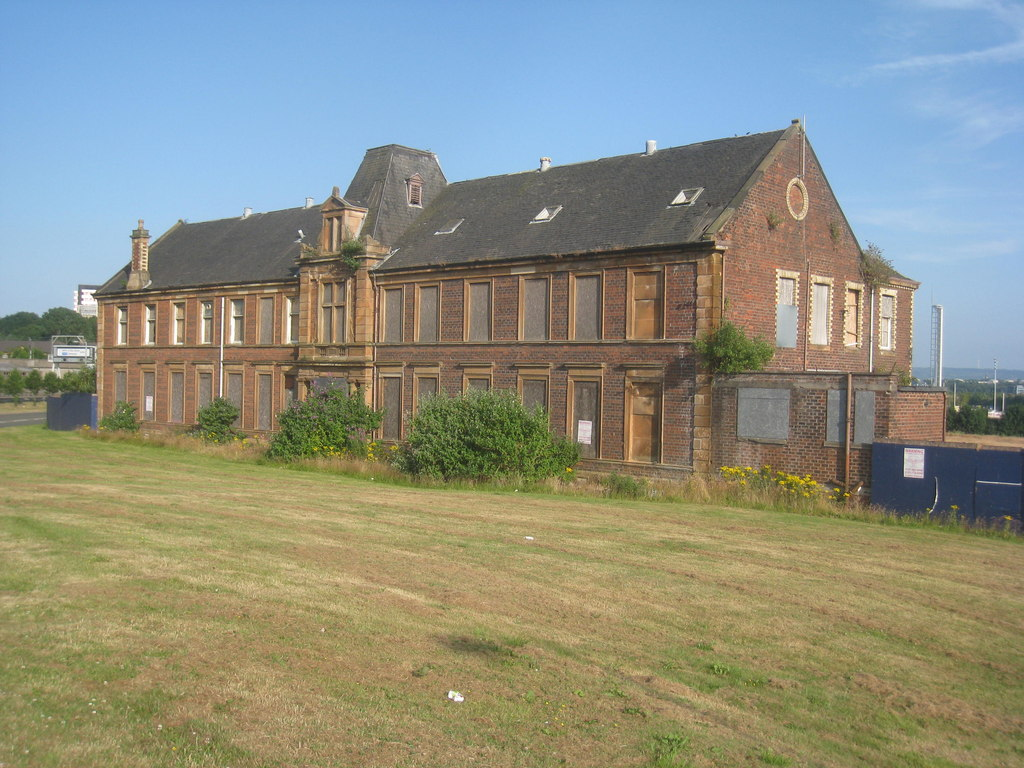
Scotway House in 2013

The office buildings existed until 2017 and were used by haulage businesses: initially by Duncan Barbour Ltd and then by Clyde Port Authority as Scotway Ltd. They have been replaced with student accommodation.

The company was founded in 1835 as Tod and Macgregor by David Tod and John Macgregor carrying out marine engineering work. In 1844 an account is given (complete with drawings) of the engine they built for the river steamer Invincible. This was a 'steeple' type engine rated at 85 hp, with 49in piston diameter, and 50in stroke. This directly drove the 16 ft diameter paddle wheels, which were 5 ft 8in wide. Running at 31.5 revolutions per minute this gave a speed of 13.5 miles per hour. After the deaths of both David Tod and John Macgregor, the shipbuilding business was sold and renamed D and W Henderson and Company. After the First World War it was taken over by Harland & Wolff

Tod and Macgregor yard built around 145 ships and D&W Henderson built around 377 ships, including Loch Sloy (1877), PS Terranora (1878), PS Ivanhoe (1880), SMS Loreley (1885), USS Christabel (1893), SS Saint Ninian (1894), USS Alcedo (1895), SS Caledonia (1904), SS Ancona (1907), SS California (1907), SS Taormina (1908), SS Verona (1908), PS Duchess of Richmond (1910), SS Cameronia (1911), HMS Arabis (1915), HMS Tonbridge (1924), Dee Why and Curl Curl (1928) and MV Henry Stanley (1929).

== Yachts of note ==
America's Cup contender yacht Thistle was built in steel for a Scottish challenger syndicate in 1887. She was unsuccessful in the cup and was sold to German Emperor Wilhelm II.

Valkyrie II was a gaff-rigged cutter. She was designed by George Lennox Watson and built alongside HMY Britannia at the D&W Henderson shipyard, Meadowside, Partick on the River Clyde, Scotland in 1893 for owner Lord Dunraven of the Royal Yacht Squadron. Valkyrie II had a steel frame, a wooden hull, and a pine deck. She challenged unsuccessfully for the America's Cup in 1893.

Royal Yacht HMY Britannia was ordered in 1892 by Edward, Prince of Wales and designed by George Lennox Watson. She was a near sister ship to the Watson-designed Valkyrie II. Details of the commission were arranged on the Prince's behalf by William Jamieson who represented him and liaised closely with Watson. The build cost was £8,300.

Valkyrie III was built in 1895 for a syndicate of the Royal Yacht Squadron and challenged unsuccessfully that year for the America's Cup in a contest surrounded by controversy.

SY Veglia a 960 ton steam yacht built in 1895 for Nathaniel de Rothschild and sold to George W. C. Drexel (son of Anthony Joseph Drexel) in 1902. Passed to the US Navy in 1917 and renamed USS Alcedo. Sunk by a German torpedo off Brest in November 1917.
