= Thomas Benjamin Frederick Davis =

Jersey-born South African businessman (25 April 1867 - October 1942)

Thomas Davis
- Born: Thomas Benjamin Frederick Davis; 25 April 1867; Havre des Pas, Saint Helier, Jersey
- Died: October 1942 (aged 75); Durban, South Africa
- Education: St Luke's Elementary School
- Occupations: Businessman, yachtsman
- Known for: Philanthropy
- Children: 3

Thomas Benjamin Frederick Davis (25 April 1867, in Havre des Pas, Saint Helier, Jersey – October 1942, in Durban, South Africa) was a wealthy businessman, yachtsman and philanthropist.

== Early life and education ==
Thomas Davis was born at Havre des Pas, St Helier, Jersey on 25 April 1867, the son of Thomas Leopold Davis, a fisherman and ship's carpenter, and Jemima Vickers.

The Davis family lived at Havre des Pas, which in the 1860s had a strong boatbuilding industry. Davis was educated at St Luke's Elementary School. His parents struggled to get the twopence a week they had to pay as a contribution to his education. Davis did not go on to higher education but instead went to sea as a ship's boy aged 15 on the vessel Satellite, a 245-ton three-masted schooner owned by R & George Allix of Havre des Pas, Jersey but registered in Guernsey.

== Seafaring ==
On his first voyage, the ship grounded in heavy weather on the Haisborough Sands just off the coast of Norfolk. In an attempt to save the ship's papers and valuables, Thomas Davis was put into the ship's skiff, but the painter broke and he was carried away from the vessel. Alone and drifting, he was able to stay afloat by constantly bailing. Meanwhile, the Satellite was eventually refloated and returned to Southampton with the news that Davis was missing, presumed drowned. He was saved when he was picked up some 19 to 36 hours later by a small Norwegian schooner, the Urda from Stavanger, who took him to the Isle of Wight. Once ashore in England he made his way to Southampton, and the captain of the Channel Islands' mailboat took him back to Jersey. He arrived just as his family were leaving to attend his memorial service at St Luke's Church, where he had been a member of the choir. It is reported that his mother fainted from the shock.

Davis continued with his seagoing career, sailing as a seaman around the world and obtaining his Extra Master's ticket at the unusually young age of 25. He served in the Royal Naval Reserve between 1896 and 1899 and taught gunnery on The President.

== Fortune ==
In 1899 aged 32 Davis moved to Cape Colony, firstly to East London where he took up a stevedoring post. He then moved to Port Elizabeth and finally settled in Durban taking over Brock and Company Stevedores. This formed the basis of his wealth as eventually he controlled all of the stevedoring business from Port Elizabeth to Dar-es-Salaam. He developed harbour installations in Durban and elsewhere in South Africa and ran at least one trading vessel the Modwena. She had been the private yacht of the sewing machine magnate Mortimer Singer but under the ownership of Davis was used for trading between Durban and Madagascar.

Within 10 years of settling in South Africa, Davis had made his fortune.

== Yacht racing ==
Davis continued to be interested in sailing after making his fortune. He owned several racing yachts, the most famous of which was the 135-foot (41 m) schooner Westward.

Westward was built between 1909 and 1910 by Nathanael Herreshoff of the Herreschoff Manufacturing Company of Rhode Island for the New York industrialist Alexander Smith Cochran. She was constructed with an all-steel hull of LWL 97 feet (30 m), designed and built for speed. She was purchased soon after completion by a syndicate of German businessmen who renamed her Hamburg. She was sold back into American ownership after the Great War and resumed her original name. Davis acquired her in 1924. Between 1925 and 1935, Davis raced the Westward in British and European waters against renowned opponents such as Sir Thomas J. Lipton's 23mR Shamrock (1908) and George V of the United Kingdom's HMY Britannia I (1893). The Westward was a familiar entry for Cowes Week during this time. Over the years Davis and King George V developed a fierce though friendly rivalry.

In 1936, following the death of the King, Davis more or less gave up racing. He had a motor fitted in Westward and used her for cruising. Westward was laid up in Dartmouth for the duration of the Second World War. She was offered to three training schools after the war but no one could afford to repair and maintain her. When no suitable owner could be found for his beloved Westward, in accordance with his wishes, she was scuttled in the Hurd Deep in the English Channel, at a memorial service on 15 July 1947.

== Philanthropy ==
Throughout his life Davis maintained links back to Jersey. He was a Patron of the St Helier Yacht Club and served as the Commodore of the Royal Channel Islands Yacht Club between 1937 and 1939. He also gave numerous gifts to the Island.

During the First World War Davis remained in South Africa but his younger son, Howard Leopold Davis, served with the Highland Light Infantry. Howard was wounded at the Battle of the Somme in 1916 and died of his wounds on 12 August 1916. He is buried at Etaples Cemetery, France. Howard's death prompted Davis into philanthropy.

=== Howard Davis Farm ===
In 1927 Davis bought a property known as Parkfield near Trinity Church in Jersey. In November 1927 the States of Jersey accepted this property consisting of a house, farm buildings and some 40 vergées of land. A Deed of Covenant stated that the bequest was made on the understanding that it be renamed the Howard Davis Farm and that it should be used as an experimental center for the development and study of agriculture and for the instruction in this science of young Jersey people and other interested parties.

In 2006 the States of Jersey consulted with the descendants of Thomas Davis and considered a partial abrogation of the covenant to regularise the uses of the site and to bring the covenant up to date. Today the farm houses the Jersey Agricultural Department's Headquarters and the Jersey Milk Marketing Board.

=== Howard College, Durban ===
Davis founded and endowed the Durban campus of the University of Natal. In 1926 he donated £140,000 for the building and the Town Council of Durban donated 50 acres (20 ha) of land in the Stella Bush. Howard College was officially opened in 1931 by Earl Clarendon, Governor General of the Union of South Africa. The college began by holding classes in Commerce and Engineering. Howard College remains a campus of the University of KwaZulu-Natal.

=== Howard Davis Challenge Cup ===
In 1935 Davis presented the Howard Davis Challenge Cup which is now in the collection of the National Maritime Museum, UK. Prior to World War One Howard Davis had been a cadet of the training ship Worcester. The cup was for a competition between the Cadets serving on the Training Ships Worcester, Conway and General Botha. The race was to be in cutters of twelve oars with the winners to retain the Cup. The first and only race was held in London in 1935 and was won by Worcester with the General Botha coming second.

=== Howard Hall ===
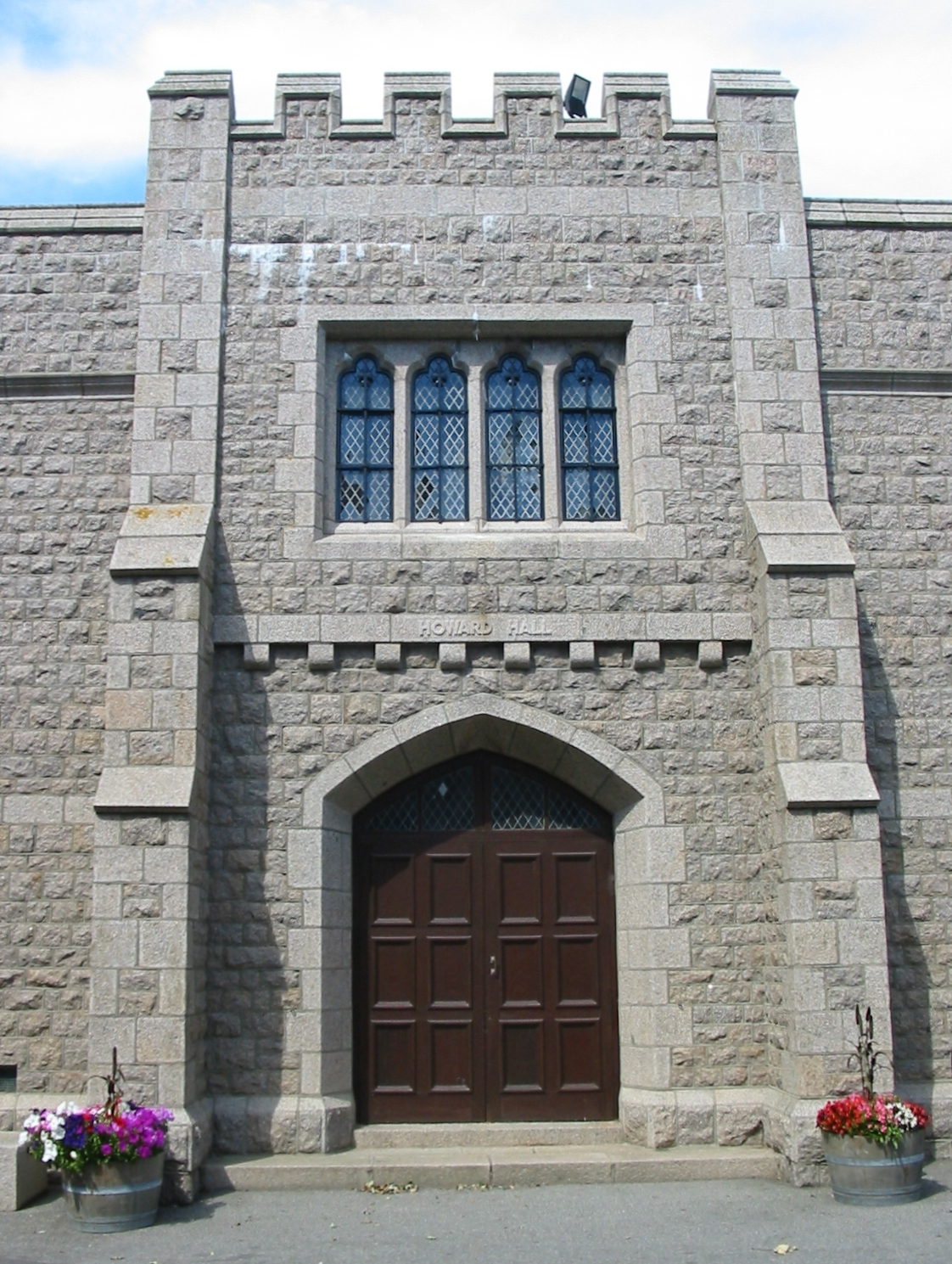
Howard Hall

Davis had set up the Howard Leopold Davis scholarship trust in Jersey. One of this educational trust's provisions was that it should benefit boys who, like he, had attended an elementary school. The majority of boys benefiting from this trust went to Victoria College, Jersey and a number went up to Cambridge or Oxford. In 1934 Davis decided he wanted his old friend from his St Luke's elementary school days, John St Helier Lander, the portrait painter, to paint a portrait of King George V, to commemorate the endowment of the scholarship. When the commission was complete the artist and Davis visited the college to discuss where the portrait might be hung. When Davis discovered there was no room remaining in the college's great hall he decided to build another hall for the school. On 18 October 1934 Davis and his wife laid the foundation stone to Howard Hall, now known as Howard Davis Theatre. It was built of granite from Ouaisné and matched the gothic style of the older Victoria College buildings. Inside there was seating for 238, almost exactly the number of boys at school when the building was opened. The panelling and woodwork were of teak, and the clock an exact replica of that at the Greenwich Observatory. On 23 July 1935 the Prince of Wales came to Jersey to open the Hall and unveil the portrait of King George V.

Davis requested four additional copies of the portrait from John St Helier Lander. These were given to the Howard College in Durban, Canada House, Australia House (now listed as hung in the Parliament of the Commonwealth of Australia) and New Zealand House (now in the collection of the Museum of New Zealand Te Papa Tongarewa). The artist, John St Helier Lander, took pride in the fact that all five of these portraits of the King had been "unveiled by Royal Princes, an honour no portrait painter has ever had before".

=== Howard Davis Park ===
Originally named Plaisance, this estate included a huge mansion surrounded by 10 acres (4.0 ha) of grounds and was the home of Sir Bertram Falle. It was put on the market in 1937 for the sum of £25,000. At the time Davis was seeking a suitable site to erect a statue of King George V. He purchased the site and employed Mr. J. A. Colledge, a famous landscape gardener, to lay out the grounds in the form of a park. Early in 1938 the landscaping of the park began. By August 1939 the work was so well advanced it was decided to prepare everything for an early public opening of the Park. The Park was officially handed over as a gift to the people of Jersey in September 1939. A statue of King George V by William Reid Dick was erected within the main entrance and the flagstaff was made from the spinnaker boom of Davis's racing yacht Westward. A Hall of Remembrance was also established in the grounds.

Within weeks of being handed over, the Second World War was declared and German forces subsequently occupied the island. Despite this, the statue of King George V and the park itself came through the five long years of Occupation virtually unscathed. During the war years the area was used for the cultivation of vegetables for the needy of the island. Many of the trees within the Park were felled so as to provide firewood for cooking and heating.

The Howard Davis Hall, as it is known today, was the original billiards room of the Plaisance property. Hanging in the hall are paintings of Howard Leopald Davis, Thomas Davis, his wife, and his sister as well as a painting of the famous yacht Westward in full sail.

=== Charity work ===
Davis also purchased a Royal National Lifeboat Institution lifeboat for the cost of £3,623. It was named the Howard D as was the first motorised lifeboat to be stationed at St Helier, Jersey. She arrived at the St Helier station in August 1936.

Davis continued with acts of philanthropy throughout his life. During the Second World War Davis established a fund of £100,000 to help dependents of South Africans serving in the forces.

=== General Botha Memorial Training Ship ===
In 1920 Davis purchased HMS Thames, an obsolete ex-Royal Navy sailing cruiser of 4,050 tons that had been used as a submarine depot ship and repair workshop on the River Medway. Davis donated it in memory of his son to the Union of South Africa Defence Force for use as a training ship for cadets. The ship was renamed General Botha Memorial Training Ship and was christened by Mrs Issie Smuts, wife of the Prime Minister, on 1 April 1922. It was the first training ship in the Southern hemisphere. Davis stipulated that the ship be used for the full-time training of boys of British South Africa. His aim was to give the boys the opportunity to receive character building and nautical training of the highest standard so they might serve in ships sailing under flags of Great Britain and the British Empire.

== Death ==
He died in October 1942, in Durban, at the age of 75. He left one son, Glenham, and 2 daughters, Marguerite and Minnie.
