= HMS Tonbridge (T119) =

History
- Name: Tonbridge (1924–40); HMS Tonbridge (1940–41)
- Namesake: Tonbridge
- Owner: Southern Railway (1924–40); Admiralty (1940–41)
- Operator: Southern Railway (1924–40); Royal Navy (1940–41)
- Port of registry: London, United Kingdom
- Builder: D W Henderson & Sons Ltd.
- Yard number: 644
- Launched: 3 June 1924
- Completed: 21 July 1924
- Out of service: 22 August 1941
- Identification: Code Letters KRDL (1924–34); Code Letters MLYV (1934–41); Pennant Number T119 (1940–41); United Kingdom Official Number 147690
- Fate: Bombed and sunk

General characteristics
- Type: Cargo ship (1924–40); Netlayer (1940–41)
- Tonnage: 682 GRT, 267 NRT
- Length: 220 feet 4 inches (67.16 m)
- Beam: 33 feet 6 inches (10.21 m)
- Depth: 14 feet 1 inch (4.29 m)
- Installed power: Two triple expansion steam engines, 166 NHP each
- Propulsion: Twin screw propellers
- Speed: 15 knots (28 km/h)

Tonbridge was a twin-screw cargo ship that was built in 1924 by D. and W. Henderson and Co. Ltd., Glasgow for the Southern Railway. She was requisitioned by the Admiralty in 1940 and converted to a netlayer. She was in service until bombed and sunk by a German aircraft on 22 August 1941.

== Description ==
As built, Tonbridge was 220 feet 4 inches (67.16 m) long, with a beam of 33 feet 6 inches (10.21 m) and a depth of 14 feet 1 inch (4.29 m). She was powered by two triple expansion steam engines, which had cylinders of 14 inches (36 cm), 25 inches (64 cm) and 41 inches (100 cm) diameter by 24 inches (61 cm) stroke. The engines were built by Henderson. They were rated at 166 NHP each. Twin screw propellers gave the ship a speed of 15 knots (28 km/h).

== History ==
=== Southern Railway ===
Tonbridge was built in 1924 as yard number 633 by D. and W. Henderson and Co. Ltd., Glasgow for the Southern Railway. She was launched on 3 June 1924 and completed on 21 July 1924. Her port of registry was London. The Code Letters KRDL and United Kingdom Official Number 147690 were allocated. With the change of Code Letters in 1934, Tonbridge was allocated the letters MLYV.

=== Royal Navy ===
In October 1940, Tonbridge was requisitioned by the Admiralty. She was converted to a netlayer for the Royal Navy. She served as HMS Tonbridge with the pennant number T119. On 22 August 1941, HMS Tonbridge was bombed and sunk in the North Sea off Great Yarmouth, Norfolk by German aircraft. She was lost 3 cables (0.3 nautical miles (560 m)) off the Scroby Elbow Buoy with the loss of 35 of her crew.

.
