= SS Saint Ninian =

British steam cargo ship

Coordinates: 54°28′46.1″N 0°28′10.3″W

History

United Kingdom
- Name: SS Saint Ninian
- Operator: Saint Ninian Steamship Company, Ltd. (A. Mackay & Co.), Glasgow
- Builder: D. and W. Henderson and Company, Glasgow
- Yard number: 376
- Launched: 21 June 1894
- Completed: July 1894
- Fate: Sunk on 7 February 1917

General characteristics
- Type: Cargo ship
- Tonnage: 3,026 grt
- Length: 320 ft (98 m)
- Beam: 42 ft (13 m)

The SS Saint Ninian was a steam cargo ship of the British Merchant Navy. She was built in 1894 and served during the First World War. She was sunk by a German submarine in 1917.

Saint Ninian was built by D. and W. Henderson and Company, of Glasgow and launched on 21 June 1894. She was operated by the Saint Ninian Steamship Company, Ltd. (A. Mackay & Co.), also based in Glasgow.

On February 7, 1917 she was bound for the Tees carrying a cargo of iron pyrites from Port Kelah. She was three nautical miles off Whitby when she came across the SS Corsican Prince, which had just been torpedoed by Theodor Schultz's UB-34. The Saint Ninian came alongside to take off survivors, but was herself torpedoed by UB-48 and sank with the loss of fifteen men.
