= Westward (yacht) =

American racing yacht designed and launched by Nathanael Herreshoff 1910

Westward was an American racing yacht designed and launched by Nathanael Herreshoff on March 31, 1910. She was the largest yacht built under the International Rule of 1908.

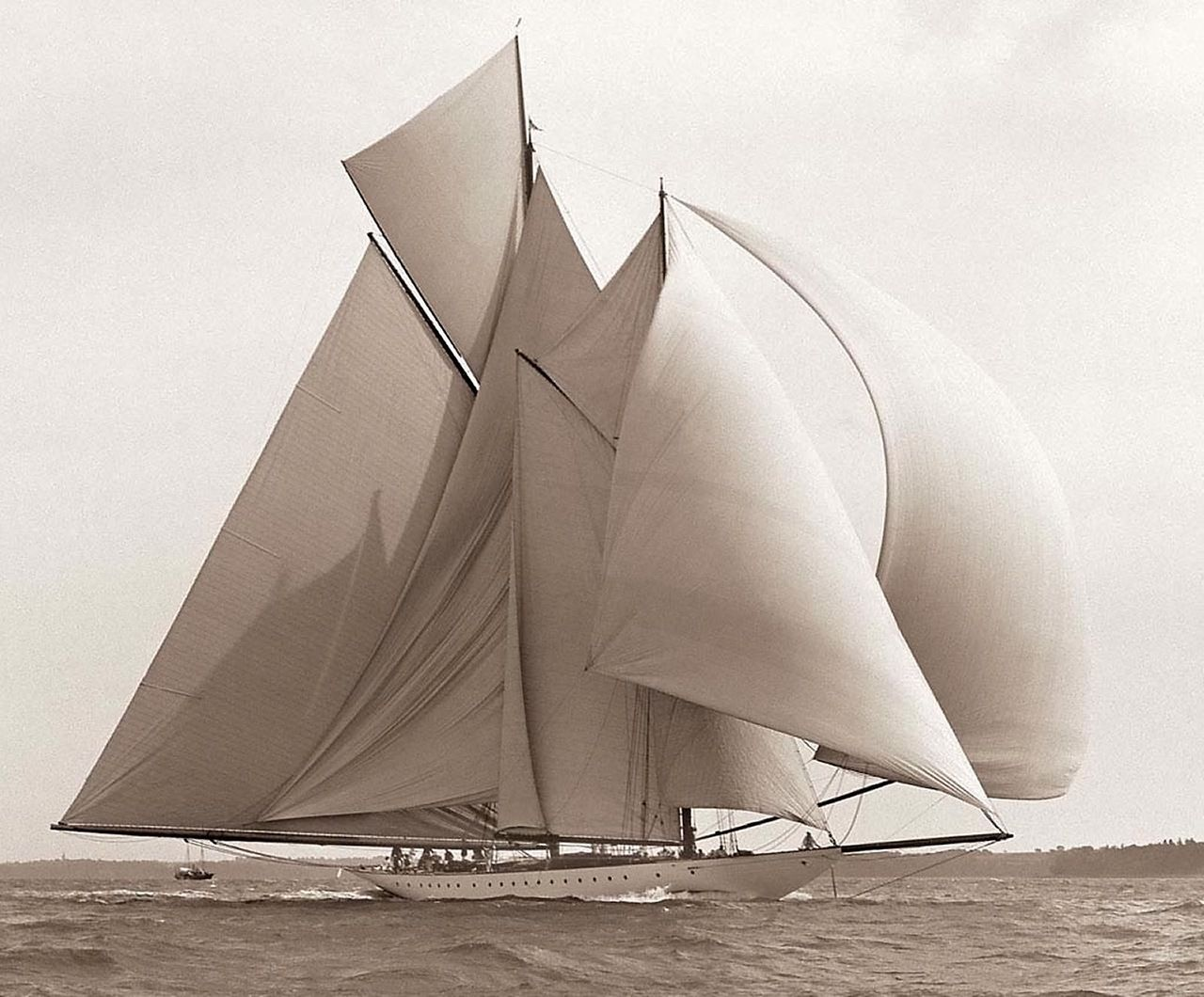
Westward 1910

She was owned by Alexander Cochran a successful businessman and member of the New York Yacht Club. Her skipper was Charlie Barr, notorious for his wins in the America's Cup Races. In her first season in German waters, she smashed Kaiser Wilhelm's fleet displaying a faster speed to windward than any other schooner. This was due to her ability to carry more canvas than her competitors although in high winds this extra load made her nearly unmanageable.

Following her successes in Germany, the Westward sailed to England and competed in races there. Due to continuously changing handicap rules, Cochran chose to race the Westward in the A Class of the International rules for which she had been designed. Despite some controversy, Westward was eventually allowed to compete as Barr and Cochran had demanded. She made a decent showing of herself in her first race in British waters, defeating America's Cup challenger Shamrock with Thomas Lipton aboard by 15 minutes.

Her racing career was put on hold seemingly indefinitely when Captain Barr died suddenly of a heart attack on January 24, 1911. Cochran was heartbroken at the loss of his friend and sold the Westward for £100,000 to Albert Ballin who was the director of Hamburg-America Line. The new owners changed the Westward's sail plan, painted her black and renamed her Hamburg II. After a brief run in the 1913 Kiel Regatta in which she placed third, Hamburg II was laid up. World War I delayed her return to service and she passed through a string of owners before falling into the hands of Mr. Clarence Henry, a well known London financier who also restored her original name.

In the 1920 Deal Regatta, Westward would meet a rival yacht she would become very familiar with, none other than the King's yacht Britannia. For the next 15 years the two yachts would grace British races with their presence, often leaving the rest of the fleet behind. When King George V died, Britannia followed him to the grave and the Westward retired from racing. She continued to serve her owner T.B. Davis until his death in 1947 when accordance with his will, she was scuttled and sunk off Jersey in the Channel Islands.

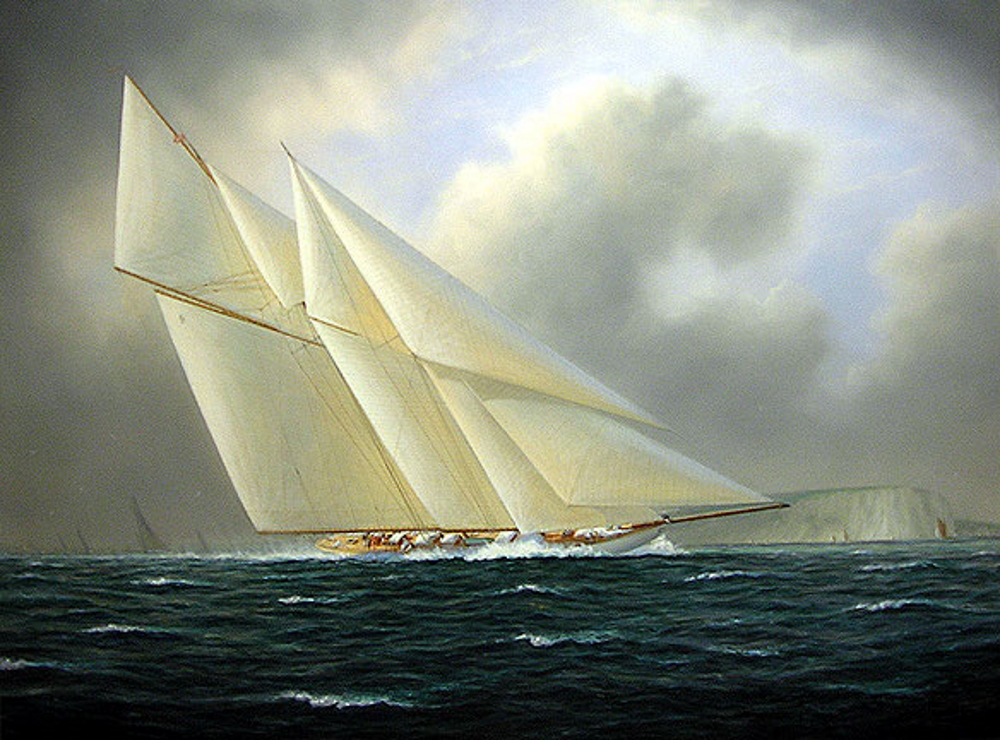
An oil painting by Tim Thompson

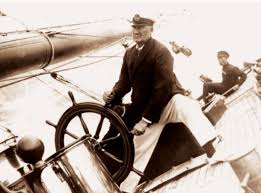
Charlie Barr, skipper of the Westward during a race circa 1910
