= The Satanita =

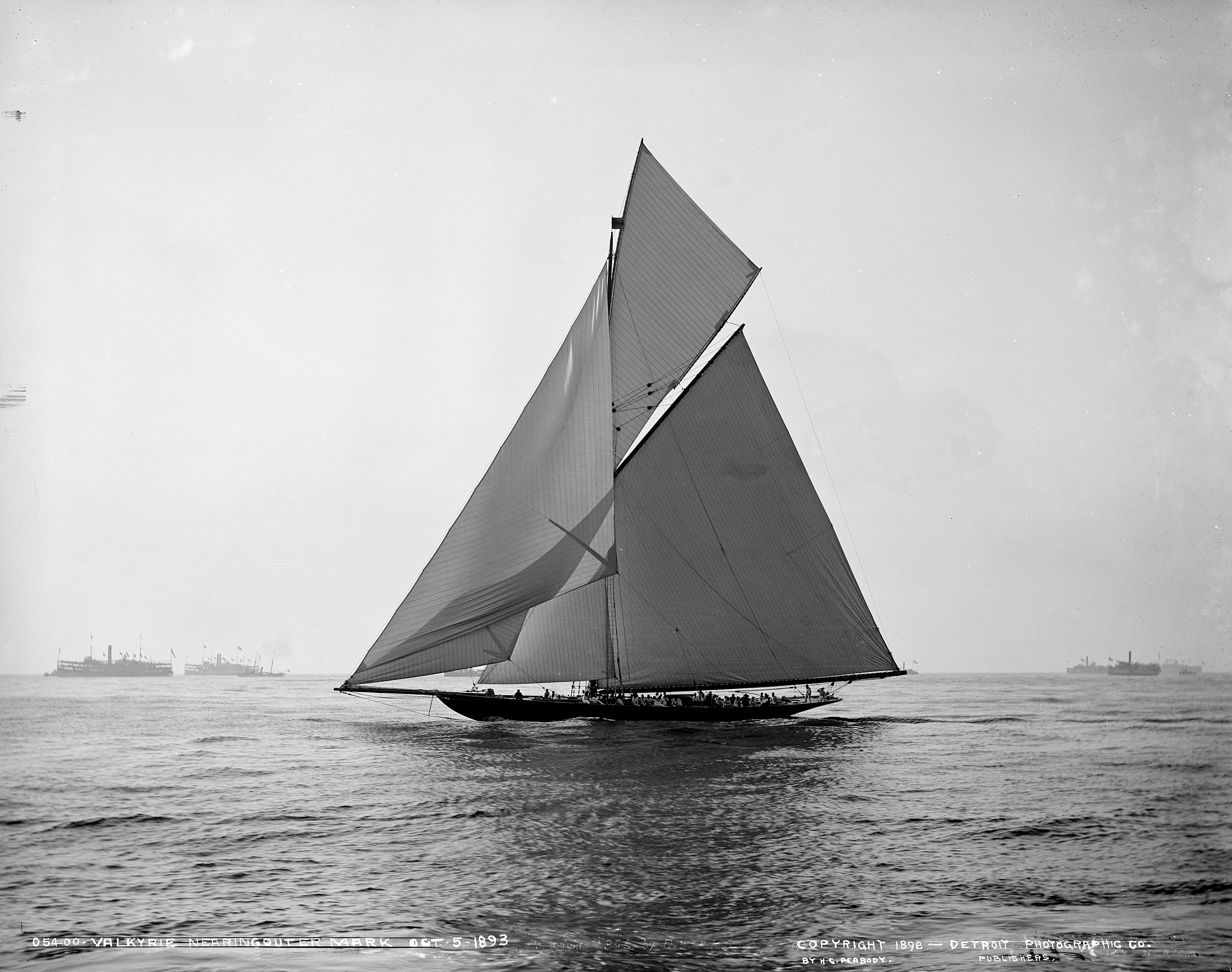
- Valkyrie II, the victim of The Satanita
- Court: House of Lords
- Full case name: Clarke v Earl of Dunraven
- Citation: [1897] AC 59

Case history
- Prior action: [1895] P 248

Keywords
- Offer and acceptance, rules of game

The Satanita [1897] AC 59 is an English contract law case, decided in the Court of Appeal, which concerned the formation of a contract. It is notable because it stands as an example of a case which does not fit the typical pattern of offer and acceptance that English law purports to require to find agreement.

== Facts ==
Lord Dunraven, owner of the Valkyrie II, and A.D. Clarke, owner of the American vessel Satanita, each entered their yachts in a race in the Firth of Clyde organised by the Mudhook Yacht Club. Each agreed to the rules, one of which was that rule breakers were liable for all consequential damage, displacing the statutory position that a defendant's liability is limited. On 5 July 1894, the Satanita collided with Lord Dunraven's yacht, injuring a crewmember ("The unfortunate man was a seaman named Brown, one of whose legs was broken") and causing it to sink.

== Judgment ==
The Court of Appeal held that there was a contract for the owner of The Satanita to pay Lord Dunraven compensation. Lord Esher MR held that a contract had been formed, since "one of the conditions is, that if you do sail for one of such prizes you must enter into an obligation with the owners of the yachts who are competing, which they at the same time enter into similarly with you… If that is so, then when they do sail, and not till then, that relation is immediately formed between the yacht owners". Lopes LJ agreed that there was a contract.

Probably a contract with the committee in certain cases, but also a contract between the owners of the competing yachts amongst themselves, and that contract was an undertaking that the owners of one competing yacht would pay the owner of any other competing yacht injured by his yacht all the damages arising from any infringement or disobedience of the rules.

Rigby LJ said that,

all that is necessary to constitute a contract between the yacht owners is to bring home to each of them the knowledge that the race is to be run under the Yacht Racing Association rules, and that they, the one and the other, deliberately enter for the race upon those terms… The contract did not arise with any one, other than the managing committee, at the moment that the yacht owner signed the document, which it was necessary to sign in order to be a competitor. But when the owner of the Satanita on the one hand, and the owner of the Valkyrie on the other, actually came forward and became competitors upon those terms, I think it would be idle to say there was not then, and thereby, a contract between them, provided always that there is something in the rule which points to a bargain between the owners of yachts.

=== House of Lords ===
Without analysing the issue of whether there was a contract, the House of Lords upheld the Court of Appeal's decision.

== See also ==
- English contract law
