= Valkyrie II =

1893 British racing yacht

Coordinates: 55.614°N 4.950°W

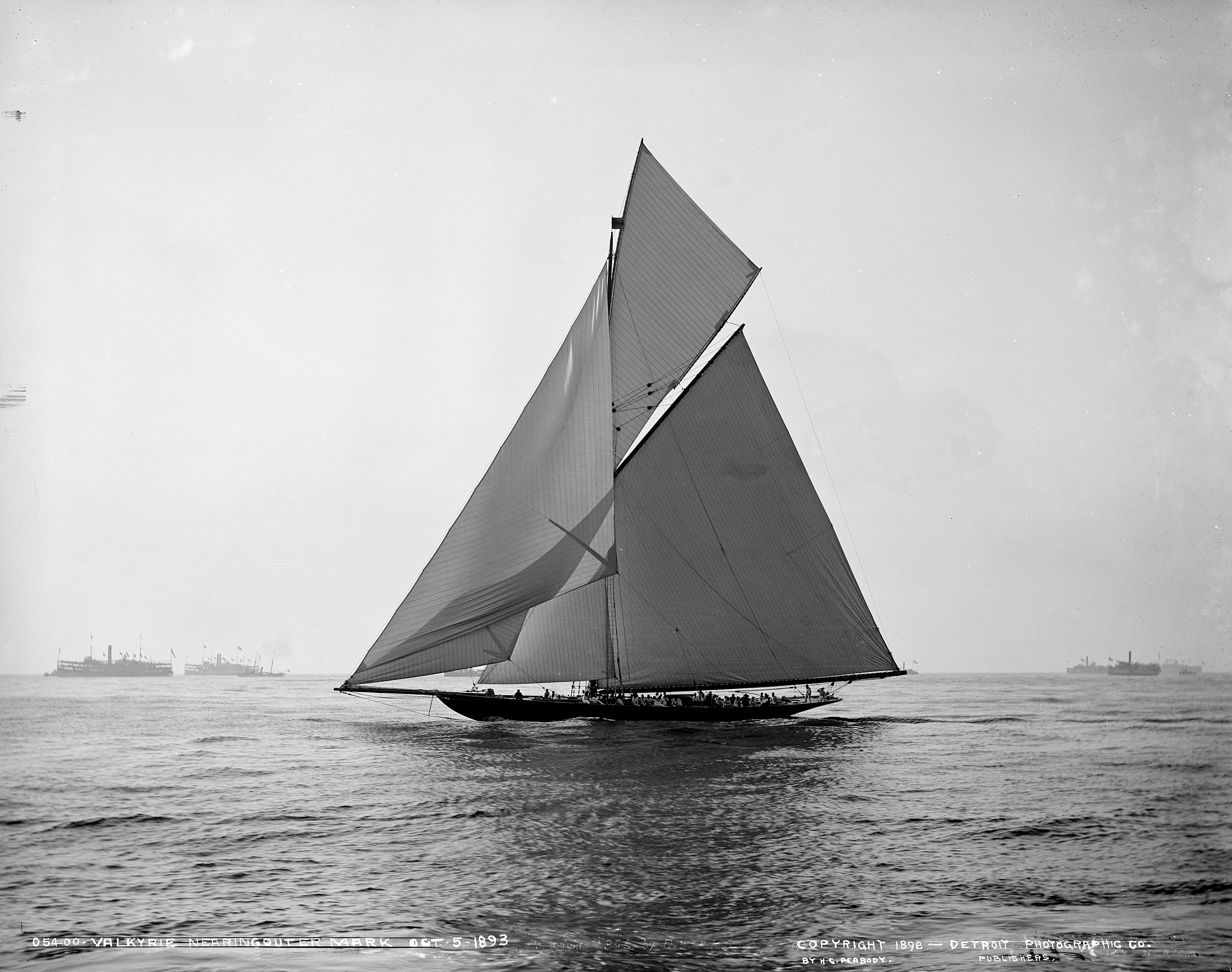
- Valkyrie II during the 1893 cup races.
- Yacht club: Royal Yacht Squadron
- Nation: United Kingdom
- Designer(s): George Lennox Watson
- Builder: D&W Henderson, Partick
- Launched: April 29, 1893
- Owner(s): Lord Dunraven
- Fate: Sank July 5, 1894 in the Firth of Clyde

Racing career
- America's Cup: 1893

Specifications
- Displacement: 140 tons
- Length: 35.84 m (117.6 ft) (LOA); 26.06 m (85.5 ft) (LWL)
- Beam: 6.80 m (22.3 ft)
- Draft: 5.03 m (16.5 ft)

Valkyrie II, officially named Valkyrie, (Note: Although officially named Valkyrie, ON 102581, the "II" was used to differentiate Lord Dunraven's three yachts of the same name.) was a British racing yacht that was the unsuccessful challenger of the 1893 America's Cup race against American defender Vigilant.

== Design ==
Valkyrie II was a gaff-rigged cutter. She was designed by George Lennox Watson and built alongside HMY Britannia at the D&W Henderson shipyard, Meadowside, Partick on the River Clyde, Scotland in 1893 for owner Lord Dunraven of the Royal Yacht Squadron.

Valkyrie II had a steel frame, a wooden hull, and a pine deck.

== Career ==
Valkyrie II was launched on April 29, 1893, a week after Britannia, and sailed to the U.S. that October to compete in the eighth America's Cup where she faced Vigilant in a best three out of five races format sailed on alternating courses. The races were sailed October 7, 9, and 13, 1893 off Sandy Hook, NJ just south of New York. The first and third races were 15 miles to windward off Scotland Lightship and return to leeward, the second race was a 30-mile equilateral triangle.

In the first race on October 7, Valkyrie II won the 11:25 am start by 15 seconds and one boat length. At the first mark, Vigilant held a nine-minute lead. Vigilant crossed the finish line 7 minutes ahead of Valkyrie II—8 minutes 48 seconds in corrected time.

In the second race on October 9, Vigilant won the 11:25 am start by 5 seconds, but Valkyrie II worked out to an early lead of 5 boat lengths in a building 24 miles per hour (39 km/h; 21 kn) breeze. By the first mark, Vigilant held a five-minute lead and worked out to a 9-minute lead at the second mark. At the finish Vigilant beat Valkyrie II by 12 minutes 30 seconds—10 minutes 35 seconds in corrected time.

In the third race on October 13, 1893, he Valkyrie II led the windward leg, but lost a spinnaker at the two-thirds point of the downwind run. At the finish, Vigilant beat Valkyrie II by 40 seconds in corrected time to successfully defend the cup. The World reported it as the fastest race ever sailed, over a course of 15 miles to windward and return under reefed sail and a gale.

Valkyrie II existed for barely a single year. On July 5, 1894, this Cup contender was struck amidships by A. D. Clarke's cutter yacht Satanita at the start of the Mud Hook Regatta on the Firth of Clyde. Lord Dunraven and all his crew and guests were rescued, though one crewman was severely injured and subsequently died. Valkyrie II broke up and sank nine minutes later. Dunraven successfully sued Clarke for breach of contract under the rules of the Yacht Racing Association (now the Royal Yachting Association) and Clarke was held liable for damages.

== See also ==
- Valkyrie III (yacht)
- English law case The Satanita
