= Vigilant (yacht) =

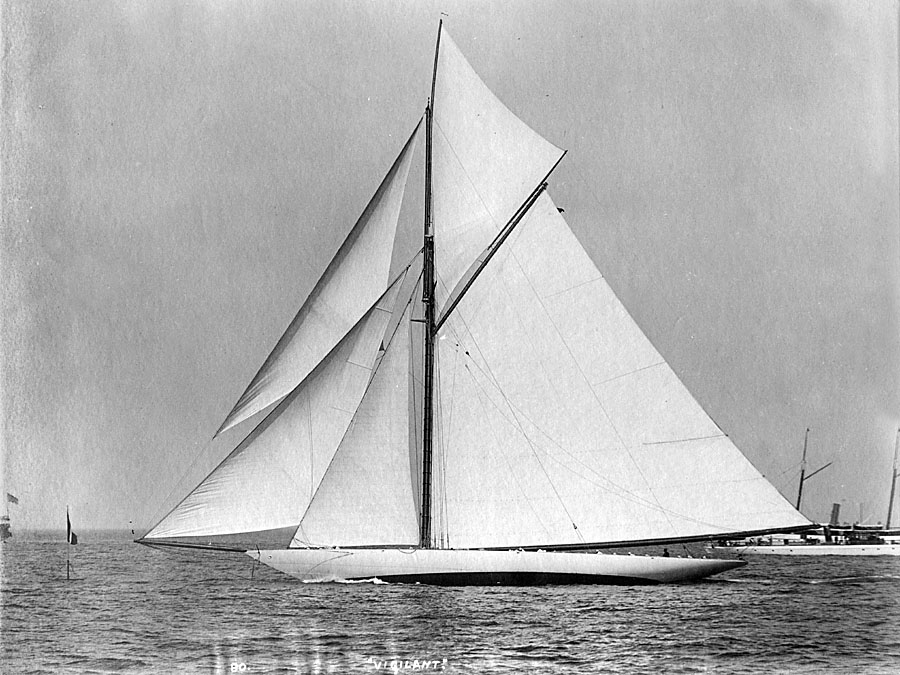
- Vigilant
- Yacht club: New York Yacht Club
- Nation: United States
- Designer(s): Nathanael Greene Herreshoff
- Builder: Herreshoff Manufacturing Company
- Launched: June 14, 1893
- Owner(s): Syndicate led by Charles Oliver Iselin
- Fate: Broken up in 1910

Racing career
- Skippers: Nathanael Greene Herreshoff
- Notable victories: 1893 America's Cup
- America's Cup: 1893

Specifications
- Type: Centerboard sloop
- Displacement: 138 tons
- Length: 124.0 ft (37.8 m) (LOA); 86.19 ft (26.27 m) (LWL)
- Beam: 26.25 ft (8.00 m)
- Draft: 13.5 ft (4.1 m)
- Sail area: 11,272 sq ft (1,047.2 m^{2}); 1,014.5 m^{2} (10,920 sq ft)

Vigilant was the victorious United States defender of the eighth America's Cup in 1893 against British challenger Valkyrie II. Vigilant was designed by Nathanael Greene Herreshoff and built in 1893 by the Herreshoff Manufacturing Company of Bristol, Rhode Island. She was Herreshoff's first victorious America's Cup defender design.

== Design ==
Vigilant was a centerboard sloop with all-metal (steel and bronze) construction. She was owned by a syndicate led by Charles Oliver Iselin and which included Edwin Dennison Morgan, August Belmont Jr., Cornelius Vanderbilt, Charles R. Flint, Chester W. Chapin, George R. Clark, Henry Astor Carey, Dr. Barton Hopkins, E.M. Fulton Jr. and Adrian G Iselin. She was skippered by Nathanael Greene Herreshoff himself.

== Career ==
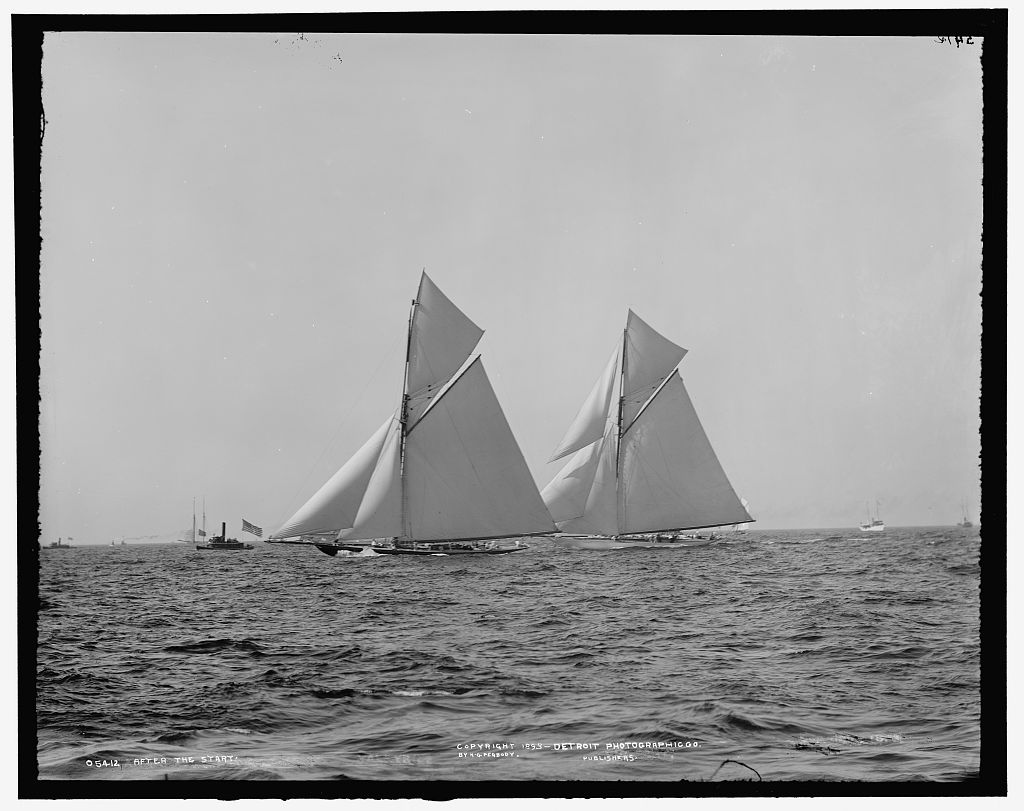
Vigilant and Valkyrie II

Launched on June 14, 1893, Vigilant beat Colonia, Jubilee, and Pilgrim to win the 1893 American selection trials for the America's Cup defense.

In the 1893 America's Cup Vigilant faced Lord Dunraven's British keel cutter Valkyrie II in a best three out of five races format sailed on alternating courses. The races were sailed October 7, 9, and 13, 1893 off Sandy Hook, NJ just south of New York. The first and third races were 15 miles to windward off Scotland Lightship and return to leeward, the second race was a 30-mile equilateral triangle. Lord Dunraven's daughter became the first female to sail in an international yacht race in the United States.

In the first race on October 7, in light air, Valkyrie II won the 11:25 am start by 15 seconds and one boat length. At the first mark, Vigilant held a nine-minute lead. Vigilant crossed the finish line 7 minutes ahead of Valkyrie II—8 minutes 48 seconds in corrected time.

In the second race on October 9, Vigilant won the 11:25 am start by 5 seconds, but Valkyrie II worked out to an early lead of 5 boat lengths in a building 24 miles per hour (39 km/h; 21 kn) breeze. By the first mark, Vigilant held a five-minute lead and worked out to a 9-minute lead at the second mark. At the finish Vigilant beat Valkyrie II by 12 minutes 30 seconds—10 minutes 35 seconds in corrected time.

In the third race on October 13, 1893, Lord Dunraven, was facing elimination but was certain the Valkyrie II could equal or better Vigilant in the strong breeze. Valkyrie II led the windward leg, but lost a spinnaker at the two-thirds point of the downwind run. At the finish, Vigilant beat Valkyrie II by 40 seconds in corrected time to successfully defend the cup. The World reported it as the fastest race ever sailed, over a course of 15 miles to windward and return under reefed sail and a gale.

In 1894 Vigilant was bought by Howard Gould and became the first America's Cup defender to sail in Europe for the British yachting season. In the Mount's Bay Regatta of July 28, 1894 the Vigilant was piloted by Benjamin Nicholls of Penzance and the Prince of Wales's (later Edward VII) yacht Britannia was piloted by Ben's brother Philip Nicholls. The Britannia won by just over 7 minutes. People came by train from all over the south west to watch this race. Both brothers were Trinity House pilots of Penzance. In sixteen races against Britannia, Vigilant was beaten twelve times. Vigilant raced in the defender trials for the 1895 America's Cup won by Defender. From 1896 to 1910 Vigilant had six different owners. Massachusetts socialite Frederick Lothrop Ames Jr. purchased the Vigilant in 1902. Her final owner was William Iselin who sailed her from 1906 until 1910.

Vigilant was broken up at a New London junkyard in 1910.
