= HMY Britannia (1893) =

Gaff-rigged cutter

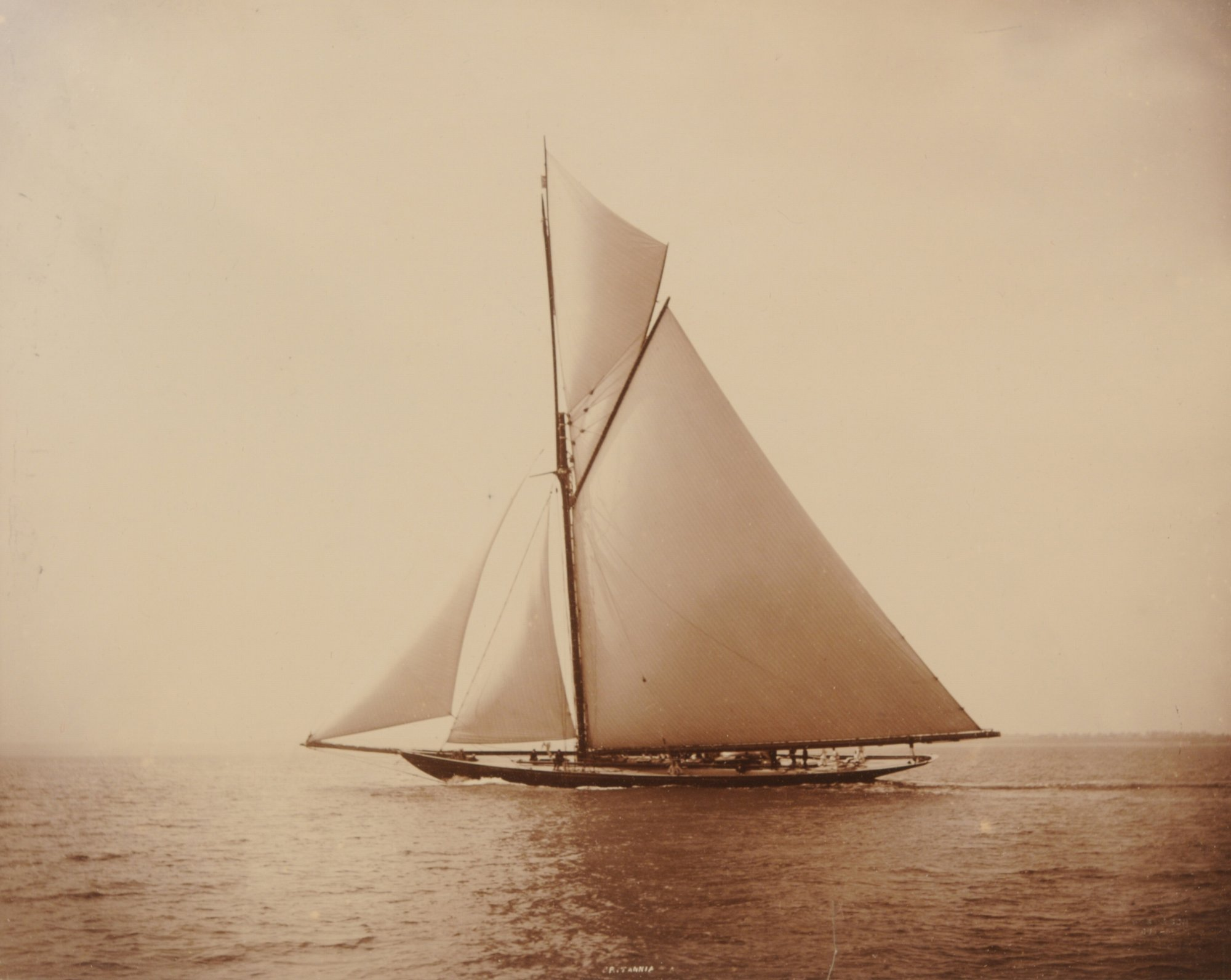
- Britannia in the 1890s

History

United Kingdom
- Name: Britannia
- Owner: 1893: Edward VII RYS; 1910: George V RHYC
- Ordered: 1892
- Builder: D&W Henderson Shipyard Ltd
- Yard number: 366
- Launched: 20 April 1893
- Fate: Scuttled (10 July 1936) at St Catherine's Deep near the Isle of Wight

General characteristics
- Class & type: British Big-class gaff-rigged cutter
- Displacement: 221 tons
- Length: 121.5 ft (37.0 m)
- Beam: 23.66 ft (7.21 m)
- Height: 164 ft (50 m)
- Draught: 15 ft (4.6 m)
- Sail plan: 10,328 sq ft (959.5 m^{2}) (1893)

His Majesty's Yacht Britannia was a gaff-rigged cutter built in 1893 for RYS Commodore Albert Edward, Prince of Wales. She served both himself and his son King George V with a long racing career.

== Design ==
Britannia was ordered in 1892 by the Prince of Wales and designed by George Lennox Watson. She was a near sister ship to the Watson-designed Valkyrie II which challenged for the 1893 America's Cup. Details of the commission were arranged on the Prince's behalf by William Jamieson who represented him and liaised closely with Watson. The build cost was £8,300 and like Valkyrie II, Britannia was built at the D&W Henderson shipyard in Partick on the River Clyde. With two such highly important commissions underway in the same yard, Watson delegated his protégé James Rennie Barnett to oversee both yachts.

== Racing career ==
Britannia was launched on 20 April 1893, a week ahead of Valkyrie II and joined a fleet of first class cutters that was growing fast as others followed the royal lead. In a highly competitive fleet, Britannia soon set about achieving the race results which would eventually establish her as the most successful racing yacht of all time.

By the end of her first year's racing, Britannia had scored thirty-three wins from forty-three starts. In her second season, she won all seven races for the first class yachts on the French Riviera, and then beat the 1893 America's Cup defender Vigilant in home waters. In the Mount's Bay Regatta of 28 July 1894 the Vigilant owned by Jay Gould, director of the American Cable Company, was piloted by Benjamin Nicholls of Penzance, and the Prince of Wales's yacht Britannia was piloted by Ben's brother Philip Nicholls. Britannia won by just over seven minutes. People came by train from all over the south west to watch this race. Both brothers were Trinity House pilots of Penzance.

Despite a lull in big yacht racing after 1897, Britannia served as a trial horse for Sir Thomas Lipton's first America's Cup challenger Shamrock, and later passed on to several owners in a cruising trim with raised bulwarks. In 1920, King George V triggered the revival of the "Big class" by announcing that he would refit Britannia for racing. Although Britannia was the oldest yacht in the circuit, regular updates to her rig kept her a most successful racer throughout the 1920s. In 1931, she was converted to the J class with a bermuda rig, but despite the modifications, her performance to windward declined dramatically. Her last race was at Cowes in 1935. During her racing career she had won 231 races and took another 129 flags.

King George V's dying wish was for his beloved yacht to follow him to the grave. On 10 July 1936, after Britannia had been stripped of her spars and fittings, her hull was towed out to St Catherine's Deep near the Isle of Wight, and she was sunk by HMS Winchester, commanded by Captain W.N.T. Beckett RN.

Five known examples of Britannia's racing flags are preserved, one presented by Philip Hunloke to the Royal Cornwall Yacht Club, in whose regattas Britannia was often a competitor between 1894 and 1935, the second at the Royal Northern and Clyde Yacht Club at Rhu and the third at the Royal St. George Yacht Club, which held two regattas in Kingstown for the first season of the RYA linear rating rule in 1896. Britannia's skipper William G. Jameson had lost both races to the new Meteor II and Ailsa. The fourth known flag is held in the vexillology collection in the National Maritime Museum at Greenwich. The fifth example is now on display at the K1 Britannia base in Cowes on The Isle of Wight, on loan from the family of a former member of the crew who served as Yeoman Signaller on Britannia during the 1931–1933 racing seasons inclusive.

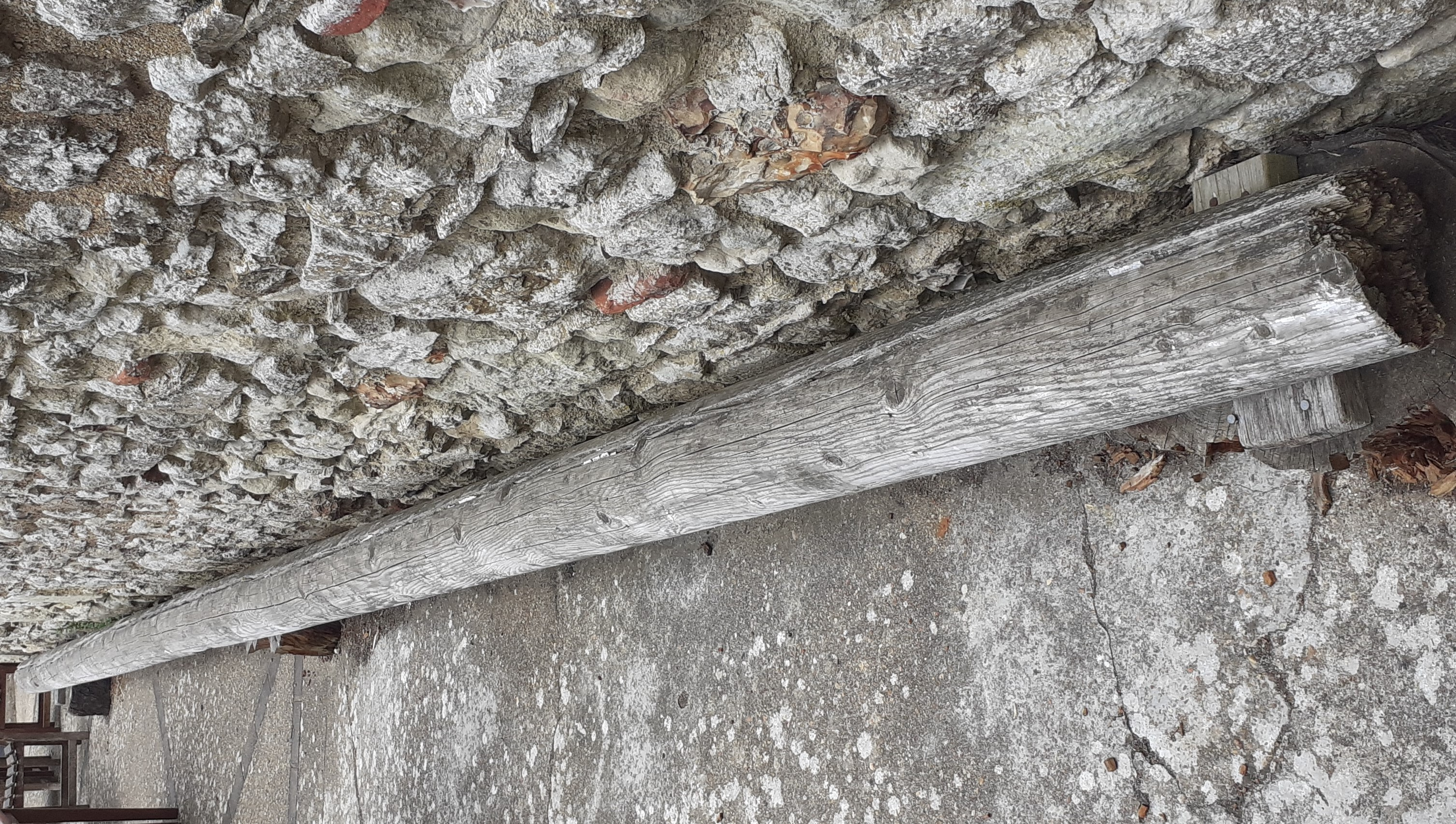
Britannia's spinnaker boom, held outside at Carisbrooke Castle

Britannia's 51-foot (16 m) long gaff, the king's chair, tiller, some mast hoops, blocks and rigging, anchor chain and clock are preserved in the Sir Max Aitken Museum in Cowes High Street and the remains of her spinnaker boom are at Carisbrooke Castle, also on the Isle of Wight. The spinnaker boom was given for use as a flag pole on the keep (where it twice suffered lightning damage), and the present flagpole is a fibreglass replica. In an episode of Antiques Roadshow from Pembroke Castle, broadcast in April 2017, a relative of a crew member brought photographs, and a damask tablecloth and some cutlery from the yacht, to be appraised.

== Replica ==
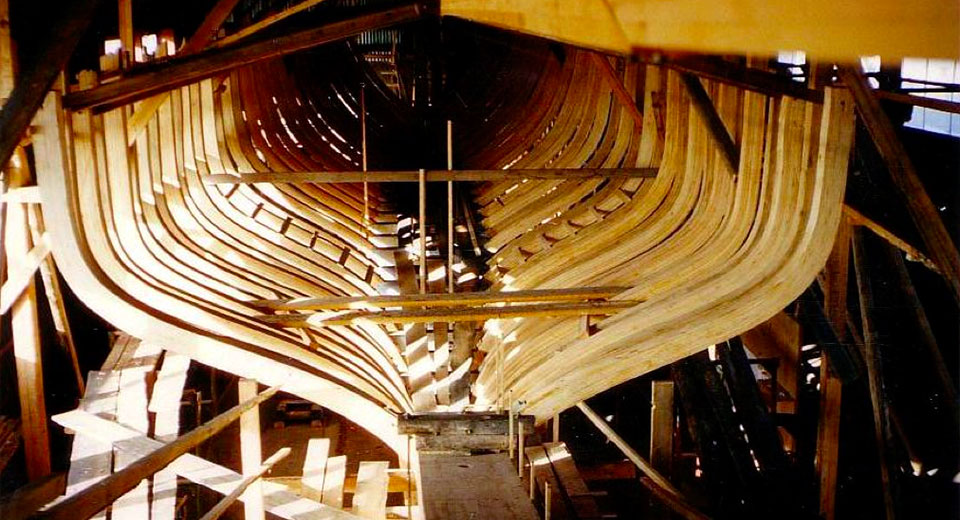
Solombala shed in Arkhangelsk, 1990s

K1 Britannia is a project to create a replica of the original vessel where K1 designates the Britannia's sail number when she was converted to the J class in 1931. In 1993, a syndicate headed by Norwegian Sigurd Coates purchased a stake in the Solombala shipyard in Arkhangelsk in order to create a replica of the Britannia in pinewood and laminated oak. Between 2002 and 2006, the shipyard changed hands several times whilst joinery was nearing completion. In 2006, she was rechristened Царь Пётр (Tsar Pyotr; "Peter the Great") and held back for NOK25,000,000 until 2009, when a Russian court ordered the hull to be launched and delivered by the shipyard to her original owner Sigurd Coates. The story behind this 16-year saga was captured on film by director and producer Ann Coates and released in a documentary called The Dream of Britannia.

Having finally taken possession of the Britannia replica, Sigurd Coates berthed the hull in Son for outfitting. As this period coincided with the economic recession, work was stalled and Coates decided to sell the boat to the K1 Britannia Trust in the UK. This charity was established with the goal of completing Britannia and using her as a flagship for charitable causes around the world.

The replica Britannia was towed to the South Boats yard in East Cowes in 2012. The Trust invested in the scaffolding, cradle, tools and workmen required and work began on the final stages of the Britannia build. This came to a halt in 2014 when the Southboats yard was declared bankrupt.

In September 2018 the K1 Britannia Trust announced that it is to build an entirely new replica. This decision followed surveys of the existing replica and a full scope of the work still to be undertaken. The conclusion was reached that in the interests of sustainability, the new replica would have an all-aluminium hull and keel, a keel-stepped carbon mast, box boom and bowsprit, carbon continuous rigging, and a hybrid propulsion package.

== Predecessors and opponents ==
Previously Prince Albert Edward had acquired the 205-ton schooner Hildegarde in 1876, which he had replaced with the 103-ton cutter Formosa (Michael E. Ratsey, 1878) in 1879, and the 216-ton schooner Aline (Benjamin Nicholson, 1860) in 1881.

Britannia faced many opponents in her 43-year career. The most notable were:

- Meteor, Valkyrie II and Valkyrie III (America's Cup challengers by George Lennox Watson, 1887, 1893 and 1895)
- Navahoe and Vigilant (Seawanhaka 85' yankee sloops by Nathanael Greene Herreshoff, 1893)
- Satanita ("Length And Sail Area Rule" First Class cutter by Joseph Manston Soper, 1893)
- Calluna and Ailsa ("Length And Sail Area Rule" First Class cutters by William Fife III, 1893 and 1894)
- Meteor II ("Linear Rule" First Class cutter by George Lennox Watson, 1896)
- Shamrock I (America's Cup Seawanhaka 90' challenger by William Fife III, 1899)
- Merrymaid ("Big Class" handicap cruising cutter, Charles Ernest Nicholson, 1904, still sailing)
- Zinita ("Big Class" Second Linear Rule 65' cutter by William Fife III, 1904)
- Nyria ("Big Class" bermuda cutter by Charles Ernest Nicholson, 1905)
- Brynhild II ("International Rule" 23mR cutter by Charles Ernest Nicholson, 1907)
- White Heather II and Shamrock ("International Rule" 23mR cutters by William Fife III, 1907 and 1908)
- Westward (A-Class schooner by Nathanael Greene Herreshoff, 1910)
- Lulworth ("Big Class" cutter by Herbert William White, 1920, still sailing)
- Moonbeam IV ("Big Class" handicap cruising cutter by William Fife III, 1920, still sailing)
- Astra and Candida ("Second International Rule" 23mR bermuda cutters by Charles Ernest Nicholson, 1928 and 1929, both still sailing)
- Cambria ("Second International Rule" 23mR bermuda cutter by William Fife III, 1928, still sailing)
- Shamrock V, Velsheda and Endeavour I ("Universal Rule" J-Class cutters by Charles Ernest Nicholson, 1930, 1933 and 1934, all still sailing)
- Yankee ("Universal Rule" J-Class sloop by Frank Cabot Paine, 1930)

== Racing record ==
year	owner	starts	first prizes	other prizes	total prizes
1893	Albert Edward, Prince of Wales	43	24	9	33
1894	Albert Edward, Prince of Wales	48	36	2	38
1895	Albert Edward, Prince of Wales	50	38	2	40
1896	Albert Edward, Prince of Wales	58	14	10	24
1897	Albert Edward, Prince of Wales	20	10	2	12
1898	Messrs. Rucker, Cooper, et al.				
1899	Albert Edward, Prince of Wales	6	0	0	0
1899	Sir Richard Williams-Bulkeley, 12th Baronet				
1900	Sir Richard Williams-Bulkeley, 12th Baronet	1	0	0	0
1901- -1910	King Edward VII	used only for cruising			
1911	King George V	used only for cruising			
1912	King George V	10	5	0	5
1913	King George V	13	8	1	0
1914- -1919	King George V	laid up during the Great War			
1920	King George V	23	7	14	11
1921	King George V	28	9	7	16
1922	King George V	re-conditioning			
1923	King George V	26	11	11	22
1924	King George V	19	7	5	12
1925	King George V	36	6	6	12
1926	King George V	23	4	7	11
1927	King George V	24	8	8	16
1928	King George V	34	9	10	19
1929	King George V	not fitted out			
1930	King George V	26	5	5	10
1931	King George V	29	6	7	13
1932	King George V	32	9	14	23
1933	King George V	39	12	12	24
1934	King George V	27	3	7	10
1935	King George V	20	0	0	0
total		635	231	129	360

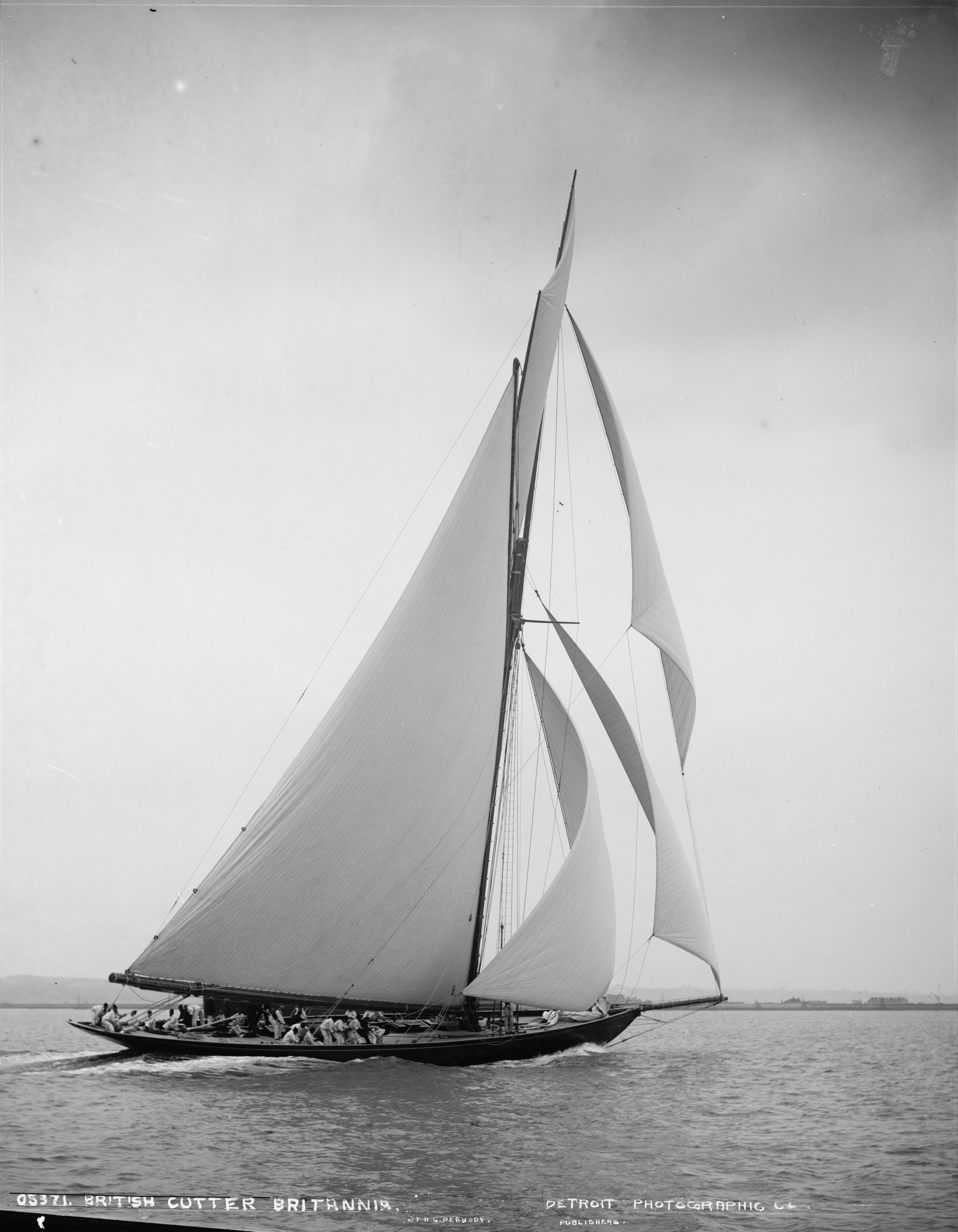
First-class rater Britannia

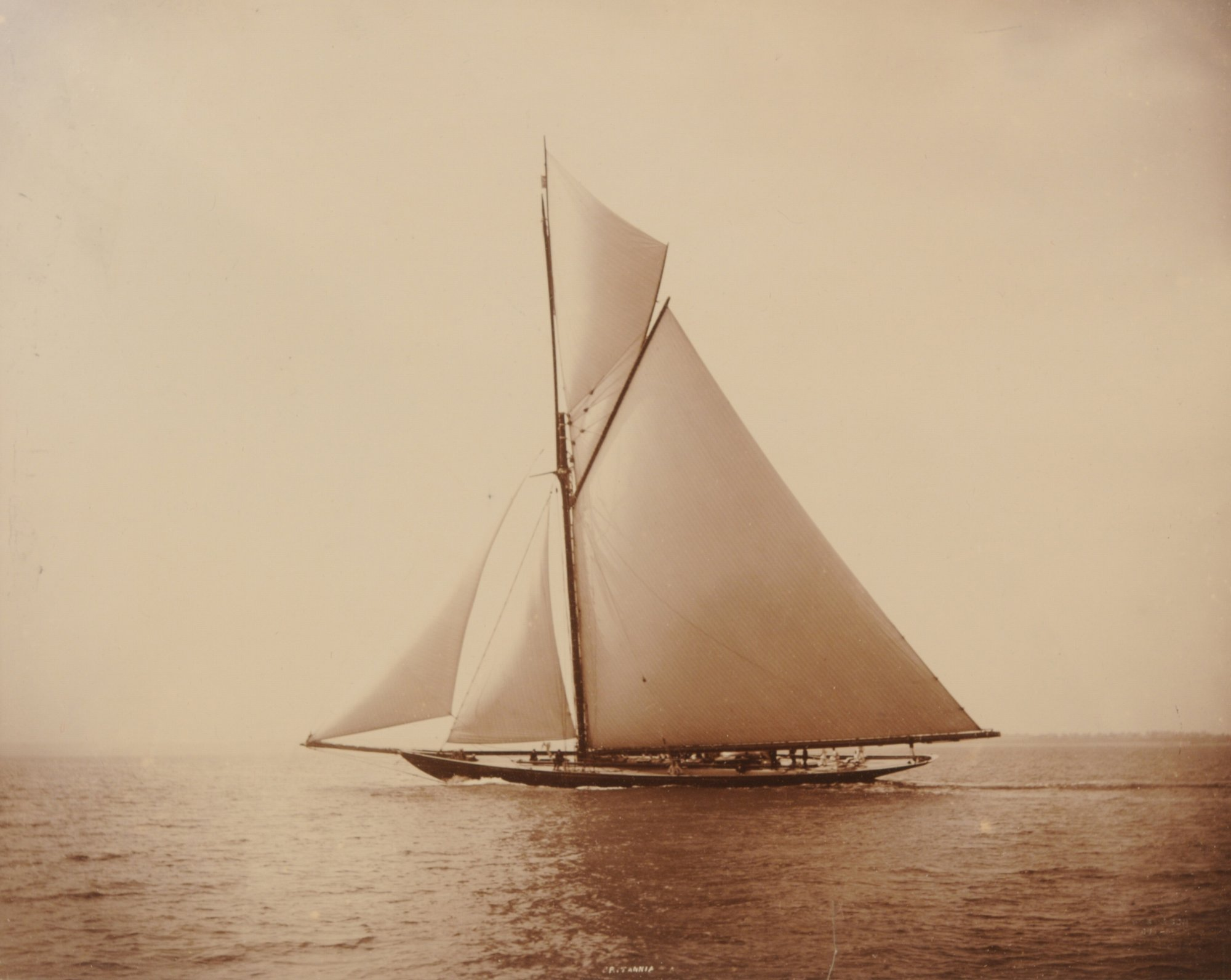
First-class rater Britannia

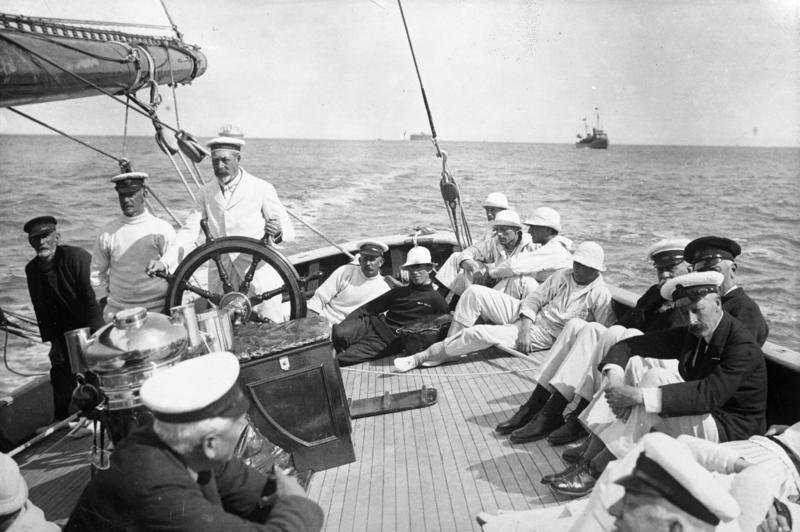
King George V at the helm

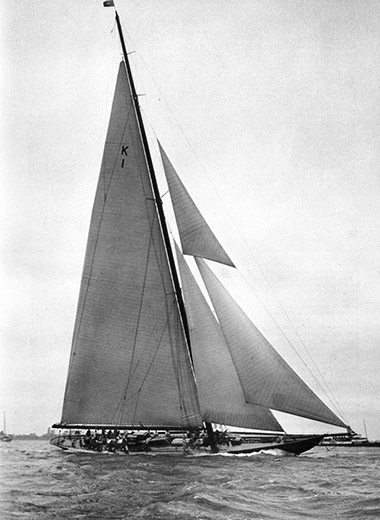
The Britannia in the 1930s

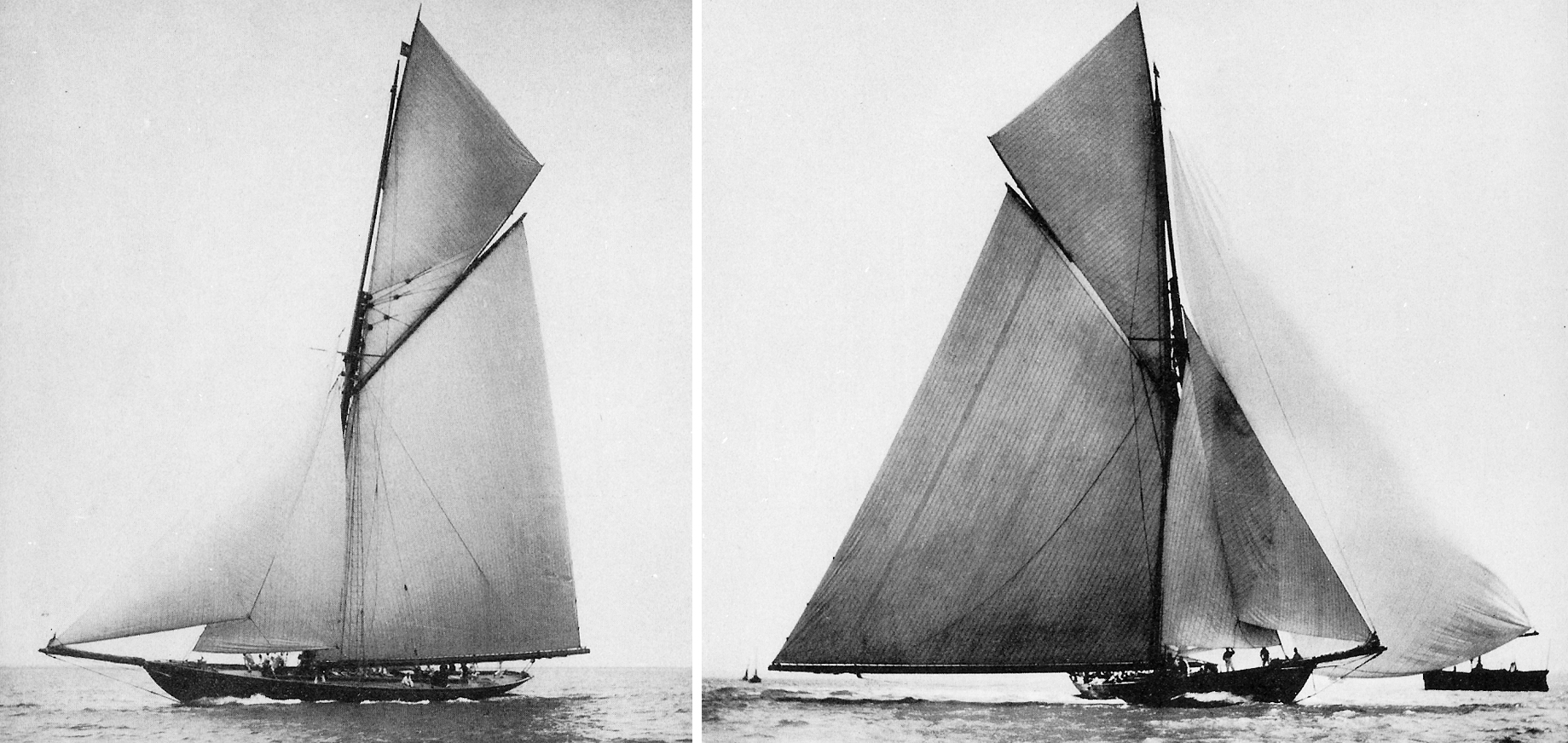
The Britannia in her first season
