= Arctic Ocean Flotilla =

Flotilla of the Imperial Russian Navy

- Active: 1916–1917
- Country: Russian Empire
- Branch: Imperial Russian Navy
- Type: Fleet

The Arctic Ocean Flotilla (Russian: Флотилия Северного Ледовитого океана, romanized: Flotiliya Severnogo Ledovitogo okeana), was a Russian military flotilla stationed in Aleksandrovsk (present-day Polyarny) near the mouth of the Kola Gulf, Iokanga, and Arkhangelsk.

== History ==
On 2 July [O.S. 19 June] 1916 the official formation of the AOF began and by September was largely complete. By the end of 1917 the AOF comprised the battleship Chesme, the cruisers Askold and Varyag, 6 destroyers, 3 submarines and other ships. The AOF's operational zone included the Barents Sea - from the Norwegian border to the Kara Gates - including the White Sea. Its mission was to secure uninterrupted the sea lines of communications connecting Russia with its Entente allies.

After Bolshevik Russia's withdrawal from World War I in March 1918, the flotilla comprised approximately 90 combatant and auxiliary ships. In August 1918 Allied interventionist forces and the White Army captured the best ships of the AOF. The rest of the ships were intentionally put out of commission or destroyed.

== See also ==
- Soviet Red Banner Northern Fleet

== Sources ==
- Friedman, Norman & Noot, Jurrien (1991). Submarines of the Russian and Soviet Navies, 1718–1990. Annapolis, Maryland: Naval Institute Press. ISBN 0-87021-570-1.
