= Volunteer (yacht) =

American racing yacht

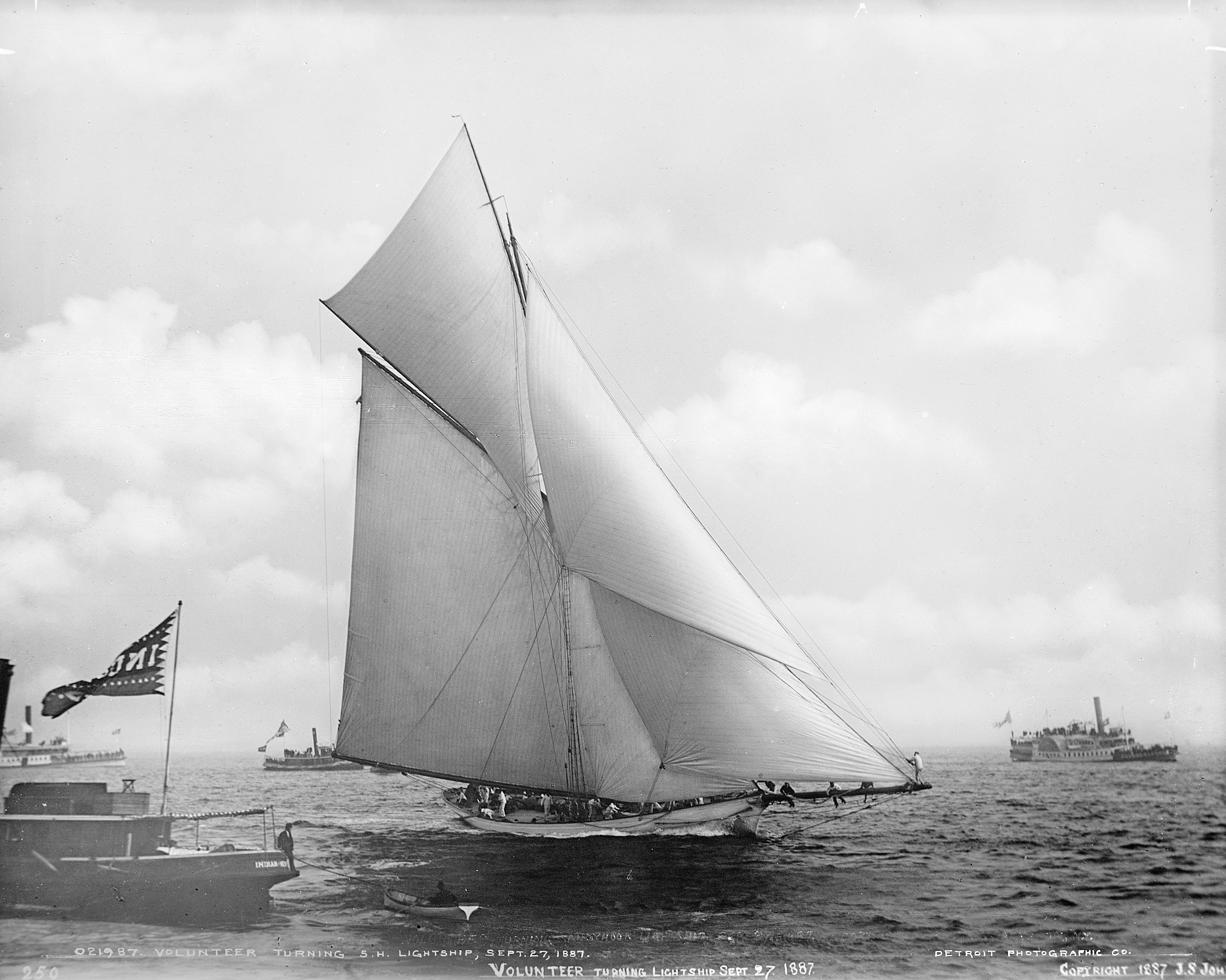
- Volunteer turning Sandy Hook Lightship during the America's Cup race on September 27, 1887
- Yacht club: New York Yacht Club
- Nation: United States
- Designer(s): Edward Burgess
- Builder: Pusey & Jones Shipbuilding Company
- Launched: June 30, 1887
- Owner(s): General Charles J. Paine
- Fate: Broken up in 1910

Racing career
- Skippers: Hank Haff
- Notable victories: 1887 defender trials; 1887 America's Cup
- America's Cup: 1887

Specifications
- Displacement: 130 tons
- Length: 108 ft 0 in (32.92 m) (LOA); 86 ft 0 in (26.21 m) (LWL)
- Beam: 23 ft 2 in (7.06 m)
- Draft: 10 ft 0 in (3.05 m)
- Sail area: 8,981 sq ft (834.4 m^{2})

Volunteer was an American racing yacht built in 1887 for the America's Cup races. She was the victorious American defender of the seventh America's Cup match that same year against Scottish challenger Thistle.

== Design ==
Volunteer, a centerboard compromise sloop, was designed by Edward Burgess, built by Pusey & Jones Shipbuilding Company at Wilmington, Delaware and launched after 66 days under construction on June 30, 1887, for owner General Charles J. Paine of the New York Yacht Club.

Volunteer was the first America's Cup yacht with an all steel frame and hull. Her deck was made of white pine.

After the races Volunteer was modified to serve as a cruising schooner. In 1890 a major modification by George Lawley & Sons lengthened the hull by 5 ft (1.5 m), improvements made and changed to a sloop rig. The yacht then had a large cabin and seven staterooms with three toilets. The crew was composed of four officers and eight men. The registry information for 1901—1902 shows 105.25 GRT, 99.88 Net tons, 115 ft (35.1 m) length overall, 90 ft (27.4 m) waterline length, 23 ft 2 in (7.1 m) beam with owner being J. Malcolm Forbes with home port of Boston.

== Career ==
Volunteer easily beat the 1886 America's Cup defender Mayflower during the defender trials for the 1887 America's Cup and won both Cup races on September 27 and 30, 1887, against Thistle. Volunteer was skippered by Captain Hank Haff with the assistance of Captains Terry, Berry and L. Jeffreys.

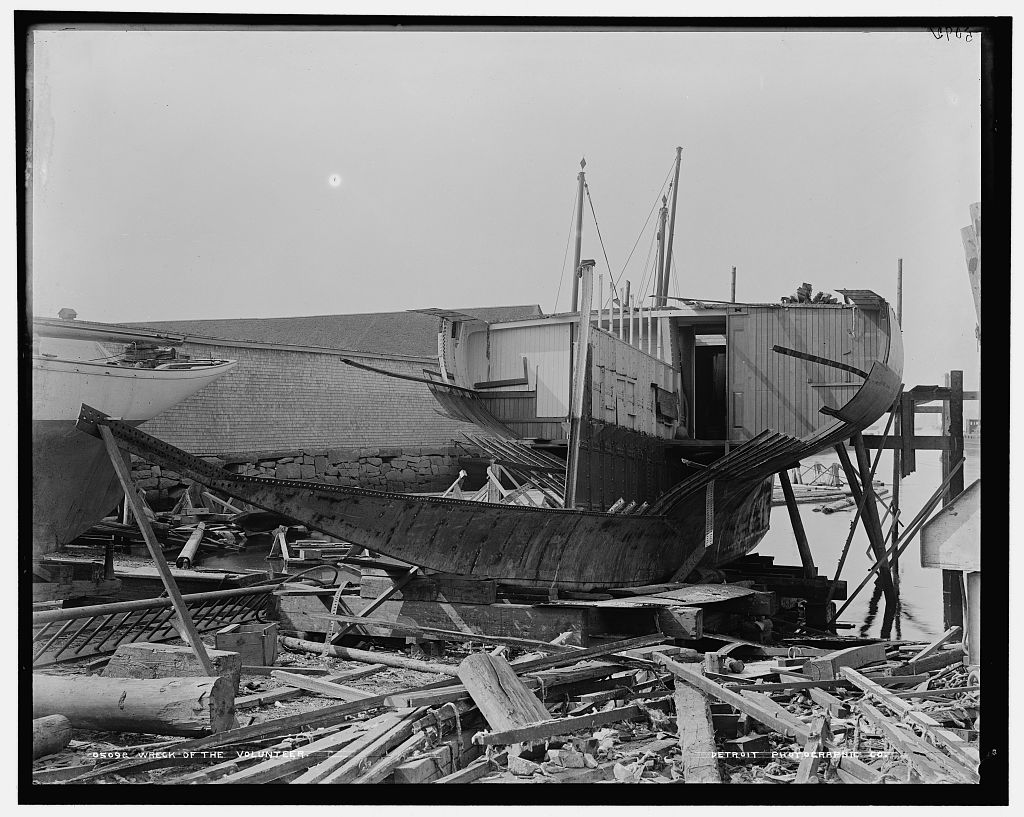
Damage after the 1893 grounding

Soon after the Cup races, Volunteer was bought by John Malcolm Forbes (who also owned Puritan) and was Re-rigged as a schooner in 1891. On August 21, 1893, she went onto the rocks at Hadley's Harbor, Naushon Island, off the coast of Massachusetts. Damage was extensive, as shown in the picture below. In 1894, in anticipation of racing with the British Valkyrie, she was returned to her original sloop rig. She was broken up at a New York junkyard in 1910.
