= Valkyrie III =

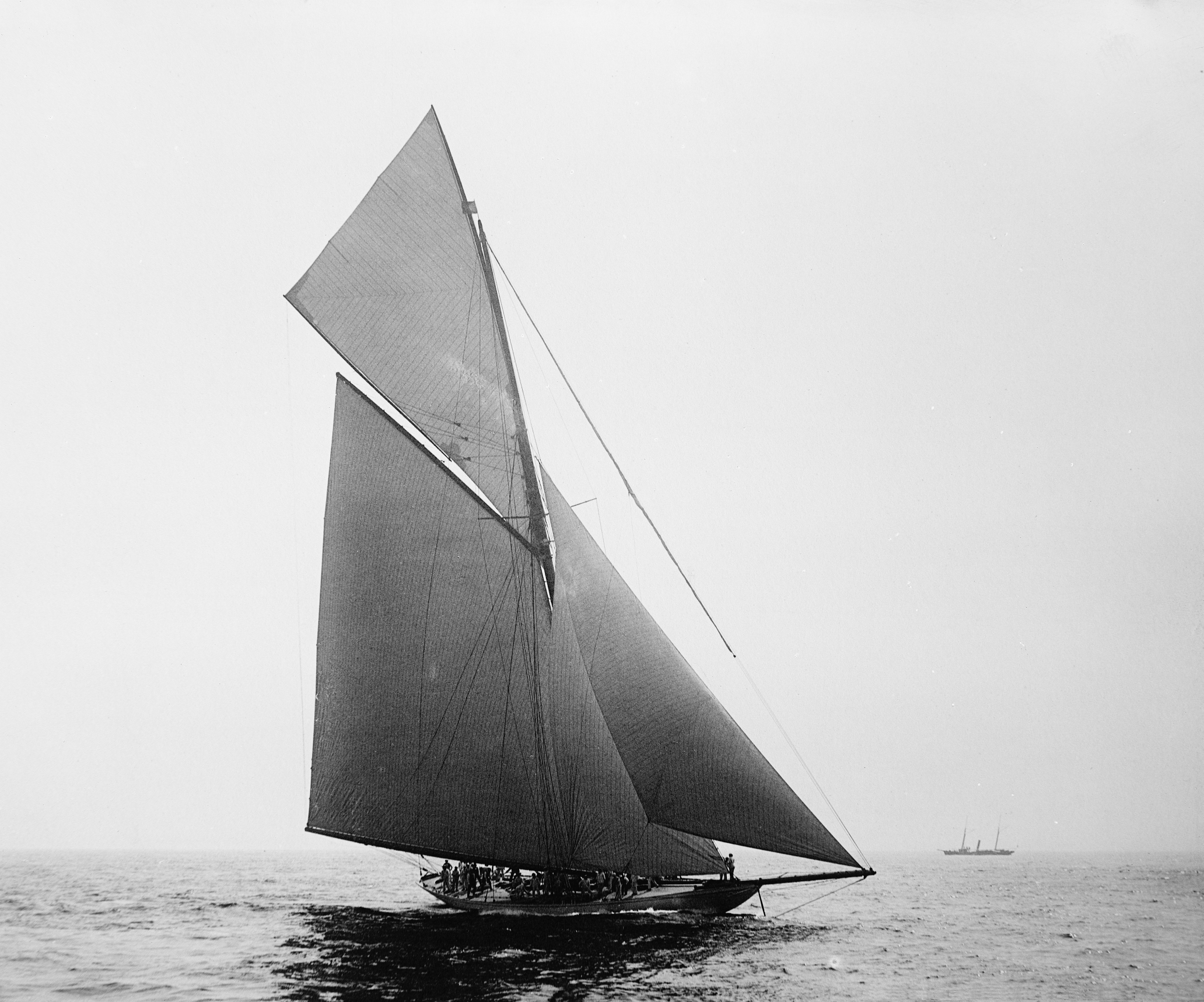
- Valkyrie III, 1895
- Yacht club: Royal Yacht Squadron
- Nation: United Kingdom
- Designer(s): George Lennox Watson
- Builder: D&W Henderson
- Launched: 27 May 1895
- Owner(s): Lord Dunraven et alii
- Fate: Broken up 1901

Racing career
- America's Cup: 1895

Specifications
- Displacement: 166.9 tons
- Length: 39.31 m (129.0 ft) (LOA); 26.65 m (87.4 ft) (LWL)
- Beam: 7.92 m (26.0 ft)
- Draft: 5.97 m (19.6 ft)
- Sail area: 1,172.52 m^{2} (12,620.9 sq ft)

Valkyrie III, officially named Valkyrie, (Note: Although officially named Valkyrie, ON 104630, the "III" was used to differentiate Lord Dunraven's three yachts of the same name.) was the unsuccessful British challenger of the ninth America's Cup race in 1895 against American defender Defender.

== Design ==
Valkyrie III, a keel cutter, was designed by George Lennox Watson and built at the D&W Henderson on the River Clyde in 1894-1895 for a syndicate including Lord Londsale, Lord Wolverton, Captain Henry McCalmont and headed by Lord Dunraven of the Royal Yacht Squadron. Valkyrie III had a steel frame, a hull planked with American elm and teak, and a pine deck.

== Career ==
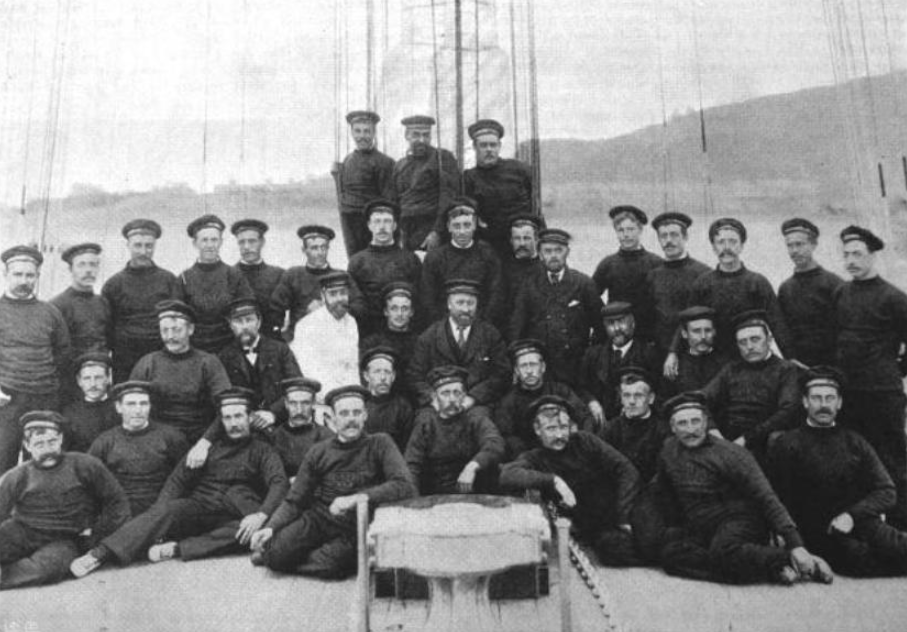
Valkyrie III's crew, 1895

Valkyrie III was launched on 27 May 1895. After a few mixed test races (for which she was later criticized for lack of previous competition) she sailed to New York to prepare for the ninth America's Cup.

Valkyrie III was beaten by Defender in the first race of the 1895 America's Cup. Valkyrie III fouled the leeward Defender during the prestart to the second race, breaking her starboard shrouds, but the latter did not protest and the race took place nevertheless, with Valkyrie III finishing ahead of Defender on corrected time. In turn the America's Cup committee ruled to disqualify the Valkyrie III because of the foul and dismissed Lord Dunraven's counter-proposal to re-race. Valkyrie III was withdrawn immediately after the start of the third race and Defender ran over the course unchallenged and successfully defended the America's Cup. Lord Dunraven claimed the Americans had cheated, creating a public controversy that jeopardized the future challenges for the America's Cup race until Sir Thomas Lipton issued his own Shamrock challenge in 1898.

In 1899 Valkyrie III's hull was refaired and repainted to serve as a trial horse for Shamrock, but eventually she did not serve that purpose. She was broken up in 1901.

== See also ==
- Valkyrie II (yacht)
