= Thistle (yacht) =

Scottish yacht

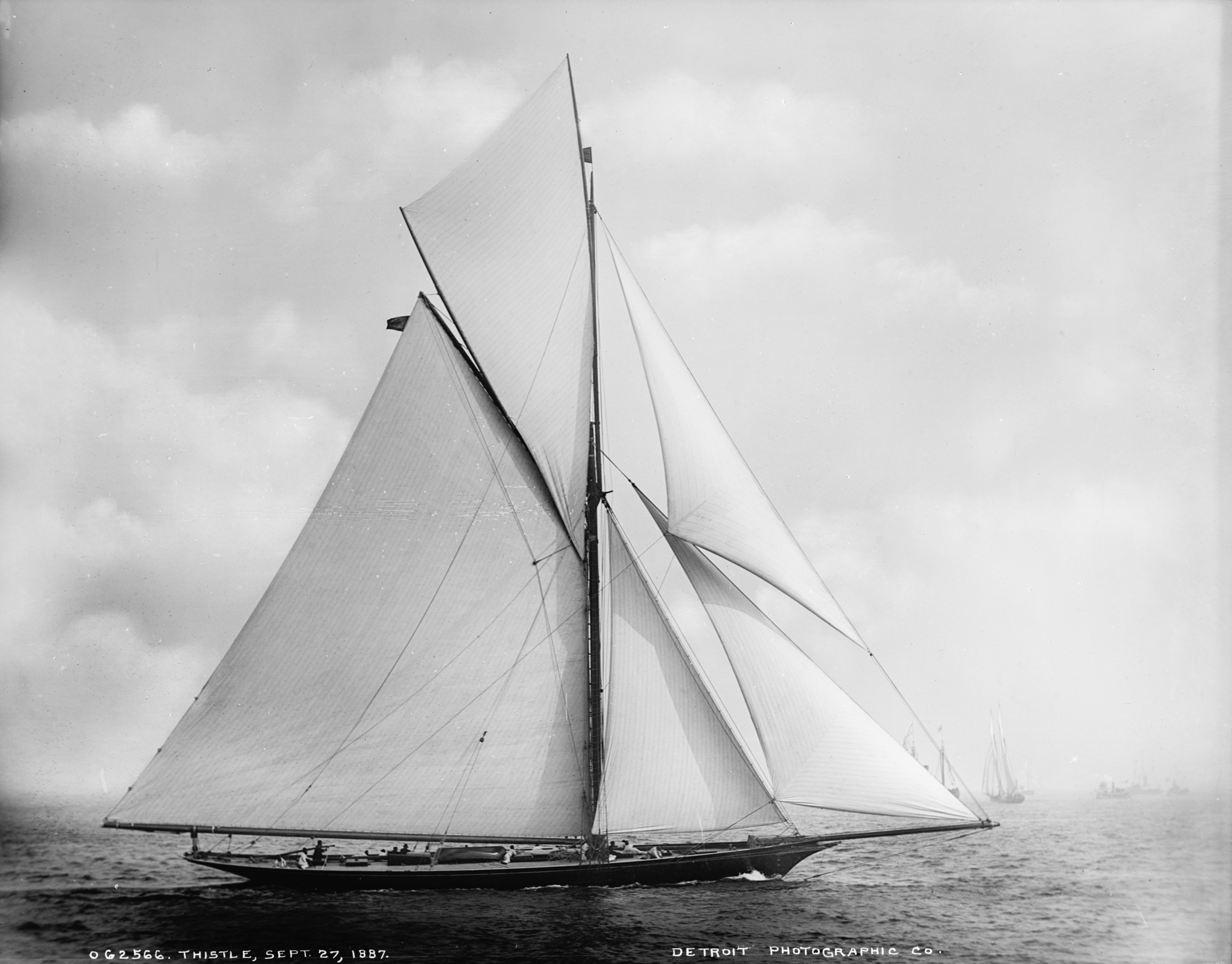
- Thistle in September 1887
- Yacht club: Royal Clyde Yacht Club
- Nation: United Kingdom
- Designer(s): George Lennox Watson, Thomas Lennox Watson
- Builder: D&W Henderson
- Launched: 26 April 1887
- Owner(s): James Bell, et alii
- Fate: Broken up 1921

Racing career
- Skippers: John Barr

Specifications
- Displacement: 138 tons
- Length: 33.05 m (108.4 ft) (LOA); 26.35 m (86.5 ft) (LWL)
- Beam: 6.20 m (20.3 ft)
- Draft: 4.16 m (13.6 ft)

Thistle was the unsuccessful British challenger of the seventh America's Cup in 1887 against American defender Volunteer.

== Design ==
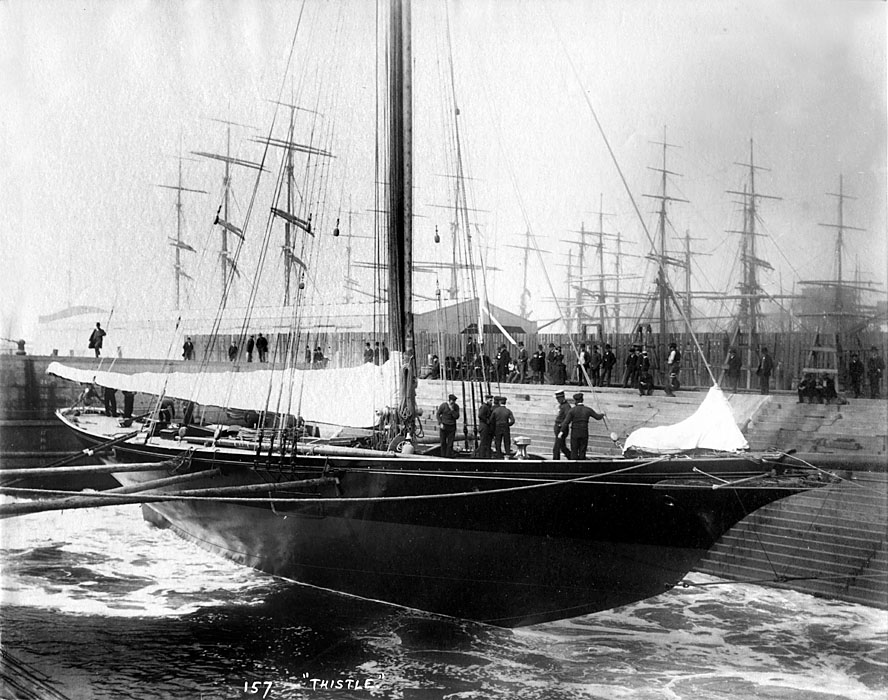
Thistle in drydock, as photographed by John S. Johnston

The cutter Thistle was designed by George Lennox Watson, with interiors by his brother Thomas Lennox Watson, and built at the D&W Henderson shipyard in Partick on the River Clyde and launched on 26 April 1887, for a syndicate of owners that included William Clark, John Clark, Andrew Coates, William Coates, James Coates, George Coates, J. Hilliard Bell, and William Bell of the Royal Clyde Yacht Club, and headed by James Bell. She was built of all-metal construction, with a teak deck. Thistle was skippered by John Barr.

== Career ==
Thistle was built under conditions of great secrecy during the winter of 1886-7 and launched with her hull covered by a huge canvas. After winning or placing second in 13 of 15 Scottish regattas in her first year afloat, Thistle sailed to New York as the challenger in the 1887 America's Cup against the US defender, Volunteer. Skippered by John Barr, she lost both Cup races, and returned to Scotland in September 1887. John Barr's younger brother Charlie Barr was also a crew member who, after emigrating to the United States, went on to achieve success skippering three consecutive successful America's Cup defenders.

== Meteor ==
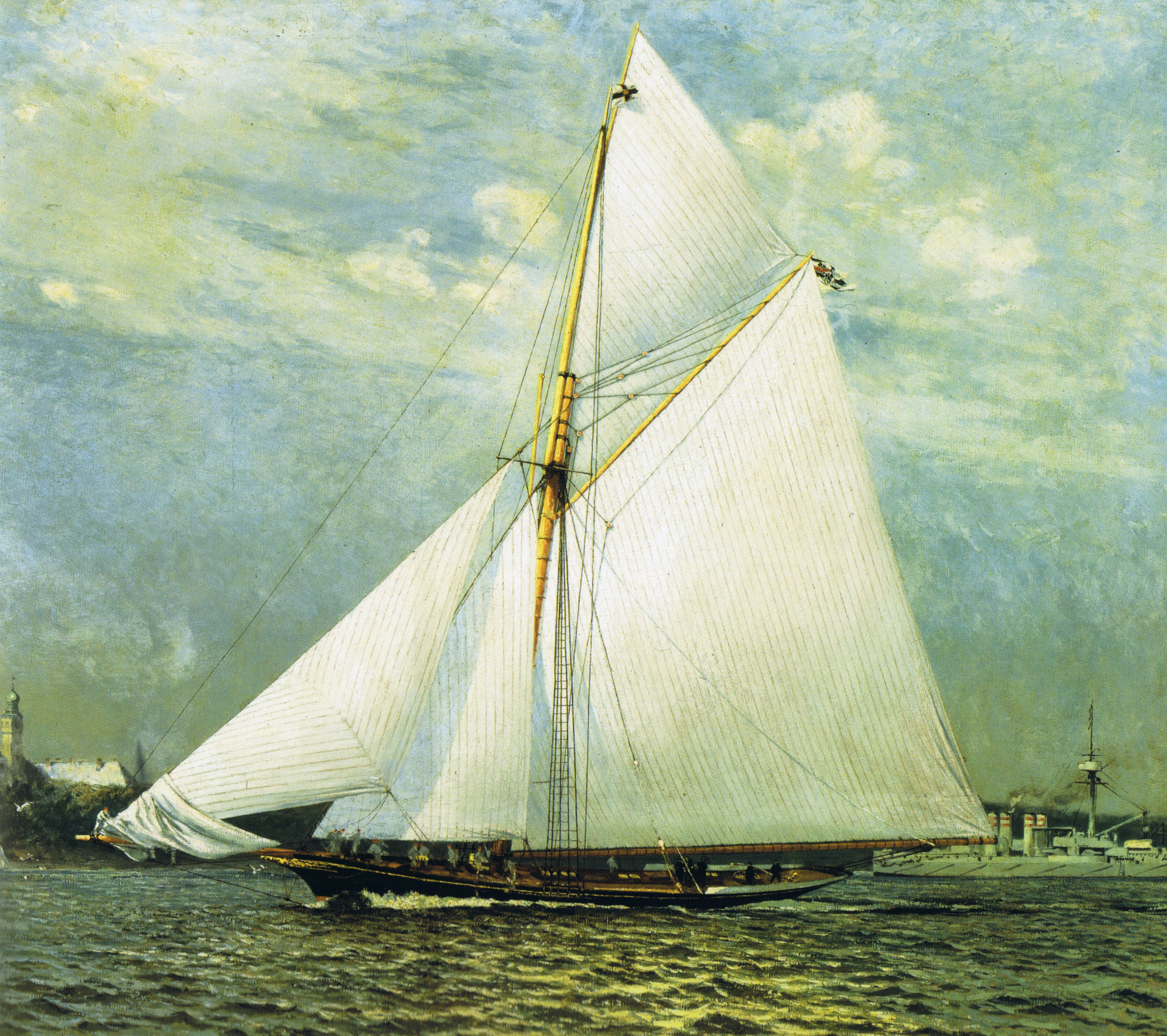
Meteor I in the 1893 Kiel Week races

Following several years of competitive racing in Britain, Thistle was sold to the German emperor Wilhelm II (who used the SMY Hohenzollern) in 1891 for 90,000 gold marks and renamed Meteor. Between 1892 and 1895 Wilhelm II competed annually at Cowes Week against the Britannia, a yacht owned by his uncle the Prince of Wales (later King Edward VII). Edward won each race due to his extensive sailing and as a faster vessel.

In 1895, Meteor was handed over to the German Navy in Wilhelmshaven as a school yacht and renamed Comet. In 1921, the vessel was broken up.
