= George Lennox Watson =

Scottish naval architect (1851–1904)

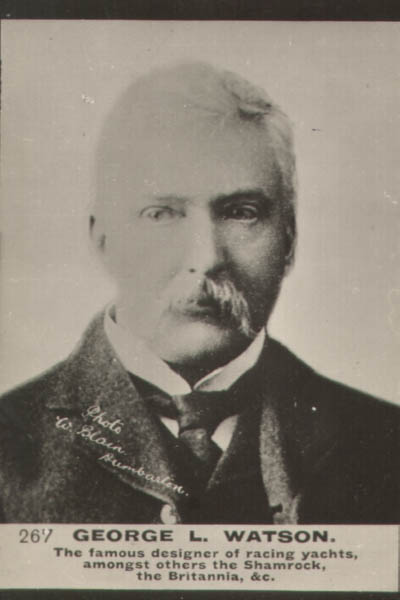
- Portrait from an Ogden's Cigarette Card
- Born: 30 October 1851; Glasgow
- Died: 12 November 1904 (aged 53); Glasgow
- Occupation: Architect
- Practice: G.L. Watson & Co.
- Design: HMY Britannia, Shamrock II, Rainbow,

George Lennox Watson (30 October 1851 – 12 November 1904) was a Scottish naval architect. Born in Glasgow, son of Thomas Lennox Watson, a doctor at the Glasgow Royal Infirmary, and grandson of Sir Timothy Burstall, engineer and entrant at the 1829 Rainhill Trials.

== Early life ==
As a young boy in the late 1850s Watson often spent holidays at Inverkip on the Firth of Clyde, where through his friendship the local skipper William Mackie he developed his passion for yachts and resolved to make naval architecture his living. At the age of 16 Watson became an apprentice draughtsman at the shipyard of Robert Napier and Sons in Glasgow.

== Career ==
During his training at Napier's yard Watson was at the early stages of using theories of hydrodynamics as influences in yacht design. After practising at J&A Inglis, Shipbuilders, in 1873 (at the age of 22) Watson set out to found the world's first yacht design office dedicated to small craft. His first design, Peg Woffington featured an unorthodox reverse bow which undoubtedly drew attention to the young designer. Successes followed with yachts such as Vril and Verve which were built for a growing client base of wealthy Clyde industrialists. Notable examples include the Coats family of Paisley and the Allan Brothers of the famous Scots-Canadian shipping line.

Watson's successes on the proving ground of the Clyde soon attracted larger commissions from more high-profile clients such as the Vanderbilt family, Earl of Dunraven, Sir Thomas Lipton, the Rothschild family, Charles Lindsay Orr-Ewing, Whitaker Wright and Wilhelm II, German Emperor. Commissioning amongst others, four America's Cup challengers and the largest sailing schooner of its time, Rainbow.

Amongst his work in yacht designs Watson designed extensively for the Royal National Lifeboat Institution (RNLI) with his boats becoming renowned for their seaworthiness and durable qualities. In 1887 Watson became chief consulting Naval Architect to the RNLI, a position which G.L. Watson & Co. Directors would fulfil through to the late 1960s.

Watson designed 432 yachts, lifeboats and other vessels during his 32-year career, an output which averages one new build launched every 3.5 weeks. Of those he designed the following are particularly noteworthy.

=== Steam yachts ===
- Zara (1891)
- Foros (1891)
- Hermione (1891)
- Vanduara (1895)
- Maria (1896)
- Mayflower (1896)
- Nahma (1896)
- Varuna (1897)
- Latharna (1897)
- Margarita (1899)
- Virginia (1899)
- Lysistrata (1900)
- Triton (1902)
- Madiz (1902) (believed to be the last surviving example personally designed by Watson)
- Warrior (1904)

=== Sailing yachts ===
- Peg Woffington (8-ton cutter, 1871)
- Vril (5-tonner, 1876)
- Madge (10-tonner, 1879)
- Vanduara (90-ton first class cutter, 1880)
- Iris (5 ton cutter, 1883)
- Leila (5 ton cutter, 1883)
- Doris (5-tonner, 1885)
- Thistle (First class rater, 1887)
- Samovar (3 ton cutter, 1887)
- Tessa (7 ton cutter, 1890)
- Dora (10-rater, 1891)
- Elfin (7 ton Lugger, 1891)
- Queen Mab III (40-rater, 1892)
- Rona (5-rater, 1892)
- Britannia (first class rater, 1893)
- Valkyrie II (SCYC 85-footer, 1893)
- Valkyrie III (SCYC 90-footer, 1895)
- Meteor II (first class linear cutter, 1896)
- Rainbow (A-class schoner, 1898)
- Gleniffer (A-class schooner, 1899)
- Kariad (first class linear cutter, 1900)
- Sybarita (first class linear yawl, 1900)
- Shamrock II (SCYC 90-footer, 1901)

== Britannia ==
Watson's most famous design was commissioned and raced by Albert Edward, Prince of Wales. Built in 1893, she and had a long and successful career passing to his son King George V. HMY Britannia remains the most successful racing yacht of all time, with a racing career spanning 43 years.

== The America's Cup ==
Watson's involvement in the America's Cup was long running and manifested itself in four cup challengers; the Thistle for the Scottish syndicate headed by Sir James Bell, two yachts named Valkyrie for Lord Dunraven, and Shamrock II for Sir Thomas Lipton.

- Thistle (1887)
- Valkyrie II (1893)
- Valkyrie III (1895)
- Shamrock II (1901)

Watson's yachts were met with a range of successes and competed in typically controversial Cup contests but never managed to win the trophy. Thistle was sold to Kaiser Willem of Germany; Valkyrie II was sunk in a collision with the cutter Satanita (Joseph M. Soper, 1893) on the Clyde. Both the large cutters, Valkyrie III & Shamrock II were broken up following their defeats.

== Personal life ==
In the early years of his adult life Watson was devoted to his company as well as close friends and family. He had little time for courting and it was not until his later years that Watson courted and married Ms Lovibond of Putney, London. Their wedding was described as "a gathering of the most fashionable people in society". Only 18 months after their wedding, and shortly after the birth of his daughter, Ellen Marjorie (Madge). Watson succumbed to "Coronary Asthma" and died on 12 November 1904, aged 53.

== Legacy ==
As sole partner at the time of his death, Watson entrusted the company to the hands of his Chief Draughstman James Rennie Barnett, who went on to design the firm's largest and most famous luxury steam yachts for the social elite. Barnett also furthered Watson's lifeboat work successfully developing the world's first self-righting lifeboat.

Subsequently, the firm passed through the hands of three further managing directors, before a brief hiatus in the early 1990s. The firm is now based in Liverpool and is engaged in the design, restoration and replica builds of large yachts. The company still holds the original design archive which was temporarily housed in the Mitchell Library in Glasgow.

== Bibliography ==
- Martin Black (2012). G.L. Watson – The Art & Science of Yacht Design. Peggy Bawn Press. ISBN 978-0-9571123-0-8.
- Eric. C. Fry (1975). Life-boat Design & Development. David & Charles Press. ISBN 978-0-7153-6793-3.
- Fryer, Sydney Ernest (1912). "Watson, George Lennox" . In Lee, Sidney (ed.). Dictionary of National Biography (2nd supplement). London: Smith, Elder & Co.
