= 1930 America's Cup =

Sailing event

14th America's Cup
Defender United States
- Defender club: New York Yacht Club
- Yacht: Enterprise

Challenger United Kingdom
- Challenger club: Royal Ulster Yacht Club
- Yacht: Shamrock V

Competition
- Location: Newport
- 41°29′N 71°19′W
- Dates: September 13–18, 1930
- Rule: Universal Rule, J-class
- Winner: New York Yacht Club
- Score: 4–0

The 1930 America's Cup was the 14th challenge for the Cup. It took place in Newport and consisted of a series of races between the defender Enterprise, entered by a syndicate of New York Yacht Club members headed by Winthrop Aldrich, and Shamrock V, the fifth in Sir Thomas Lipton's line of Cup challengers.

== Background ==
On May 5, 1929, Sir Thomas Lipton issued a new challenge for the America's Cup, including details of his challenging yacht, Shamrock V. Like its predecessors, Shamrock V had been built by Charles Nicholson, with Lipton telling him that this time "the Americans ... would be just as pleased as anyone else to see me win."

The challenge was unanimously accepted at a special meeting of the New York Yacht Club on May 16. At the same meeting, the club decided to form two syndicates to build one yacht each for the defense of the cup, and also to welcome other syndicates who might want to offer a defender. The two syndicates formed directly by the NYYC were to be led by Vice-Commodore Winthrop Aldrich and Rear-Commodore Junius Morgan. They were joined by a third New York syndicate headed by and managed by Landon K. Thorne and a fourth syndicate that was nominally attached to the NYYC for the purpose of eligibility for the race, but was composed of members of Boston's Eastern Yacht Club.

During May and June, the NYYC and RUYC negotiated the conditions of the challenge. Changes to the terms of the competition since the previous challenge of 1920 included:

- that the races be held off Newport, instead of Sandy Hook
- that the match consist of the best of seven races, instead of the best of five
- that the yachts be built to the J-class standard, therefore eliminating the need to calculate handicaps for substantially different yacht designs
- that the yachts be Marconi rigged
- that the yachts comply with Lloyd's Register scantling rules for structural strength

The implications of this final point were that the challenger would not be disadvantaged by having a hull built strong enough to meet the current safety standards for a trans-Atlantic crossing (and therefore heavier than the previous generation of racing yachts), and that it would also preclude the yachts Resolute and Vanitie from defending the Cup. Both had been built to defend the Cup in the 1914 challenge (postponed and raced in 1920), with Resolute winning. However, neither Resolute nor Vanitie were built sturdily enough to meet the new regulations, therefore requiring the construction of new yachts for the defense.

The relocation to Newport was to accommodate the tall masts of the J-class; too tall to pass under many of the bridges over the East River.

Additionally, the Cup Committee specified that to be evaluated as a defender, yachts would need to have at least one spare mast constructed. This stipulation was made because of the eleven previous yachts built for evaluation as Cup defenders in previous years, five had lost their masts at some point.

Aldrich's syndicate named Harold S. Vanderbilt as their captain and engaged Starling Burgess to design their yacht and Herreshoff Manufacturing Company to build it. They would name their yacht Enterprise. Morgan's syndicate also commissioned Herreshoff to build their yacht, and gave it the name Weetamoe. Two other contenders for the defense of the Cup, Whirlwind, and Yankee were built by Lawley & Son.

Contenders for the defence of the 1930 America's Cup
Sail number	Name	Owner	Manager	Designer	Builder	Skipper
1	Weetamoe	Junius Morgan syndicate		Clinton Crane	Herreshoff Manufacturing Company	George Nichols
2	Whirlwind	Landon K. Thorne syndicate	Landon K. Thorne	Francis Herreshoff	Lawley & Son	Landon K. Thorne
3	Yankee	Boston–Marblehead Syndicate, a.k.a. the Eastern Yacht Club Syndicate	John S. Lawrence	Frank C. Paine	Lawley & Son	Charles F. Adams
4	Enterprise	Winthrop Aldrich syndicate	Harold S. Vanderbilt	Starling Burgess	Herreshoff Manufacturing Company	Harold S. Vanderbilt

Over $3 million was spent on building the four contenders, around $1 million of this on Enterprise alone (around $54 million and $18 million in 2022 dollars).

In a major departure from previous competitions, the various contenders were quite open with each other about their designs and approaches, replacing the secrecy with which the designs had been treated in the past.

== Defense contender pre-trial races ==
Prior to the formal selection trials, the four yachts competing to become the Cup defender raced numerous times between June and August 1930.

=== The Long Island Sound series ===
On June 9, the contenders, together with Resolute and Vanitie, met at Glen Cove for a series of races planned in Long Island Sound by the local clubs.

A huge flotilla of spectator craft attended the first of these races, including some 200 small motorboats, and two large steamers chartered by the New York Yacht Club. About a dozen Coast Guard motorboats were stationed to keep the course clear, however wakes from some of the spectator boats caused a minor disruption to the race as the yachts crossed them.

Of the series, Weetamoe won three out of four races, with the other going to Enterprise. Yankee arrived too late to compete in any but the fourth and last race.

The Long Island Sound series, June 1930
Event	Date	Distance (nautical miles)	Winner	Enterprise's time	Resolute's time	Vanitie's time	Weetamoe's time	Whirlwind's time	Yankee's time
Special New York Yacht Club race for J-class boats	June 11	23.5	Enterprise	3:16:51	3:48:46	3:23:20	3:37:23	3:28:58	dns
New York Yacht Club Annual Regatta 1930	June 12	27.2	Weetamoe	3:34:40	3:49:28	3:38:46	3:33:09	3:54:48	dns
Special Seawanhaka Corinthian Yacht Club race for J-class boats	June 16	19.6	Weetamoe	2:07:02	2:12:50	2:27:36	2:05:49	2:07:47	dns
Special Seawanhaka Corinthian Yacht Club race for J-class boats	June 17	19.5	Weetamoe	2:02:59	2:13:21	2:08:03	2:02:05	2:05:40	2:04:49
dns=did not start

A fifth race in the series had been proposed for June 18 off Stamford, but was abandoned due to lack of entries.

Points from races towards the racing season were awarded on the basis of: 1 point for starting a race, plus 1 point for each boat defeated. Therefore, at the end of this series, the points collected were:

Points won in the Long Island Sound series, June 1930
Boat	Points
Enterprise	18
Weetamoe	18
Whirlwind	10
Yankee	4

=== The Eastern Yacht Club races ===
The following week, the J-class boats traveled to Newport for three races organized by the Eastern Yacht Club. Once again, a large spectator fleet attended the first race, including a steamer that the sponsoring club had brought from Boston.

The first race proved eventful when Weetamoe failed to give way as required to Enterprise leeward of her while they were maneuvering towards the start line (see Racing Rules of Sailing). This caused the latter boat to stand off to avoid a collision and immediately signal a protest. Although Weetamoe finished the race first, her skipper acknowledged the foul and withdrew, leaving Enterprise the winner.

In the second race, while Enterprise led the other boats towards the second mark, her crew spotted a buoy with a red flag that appeared to them identical to the first mark they had already rounded. Although about two miles from where they were expecting to find it, they believed this to be the second mark and turned. The other five boats followed. Only after the finish of the race were the crews informed by the Race Committee that they had all turned at the wrong point and that the second buoy had been a fishing trawl buoy. However, since all competitors had made the same mistake, and acknowledging the similarity of the buoys, the committee decided to let the race stand.

The results of the races were:

The Eastern Yacht Club races, June 1930
Date	Distance (nautical miles)	Winner	Enterprise's time	Resolute's time	Vanitie's time	Weetamoe's time	Whirlwind's time	Yankee's time
June 23	28.5	Enterprise	3:10:16	dns	3:15:16	Withdrawn (3:08:19)	3:14:35	3:12:25
June 24	27.8	Enterprise	2:55:52	3:03:42	3:03:10	2:57:28	3:02:22	2:56:31
June 25	28.5	Enterprise	3:15:51	3:26:58	3:23:21	3:17:25	3:26:34	3:19:06
dns=did not start

The points won by the contestants for America's Cup defender during these races were:

Points won in the Eastern Yacht Club races, June 1930
Boat	Points
Enterprise	17
Weetamoe	9
Whirlwind	8
Yankee	13

As winner of the races, Enterprise was awarded the Commodore Charles P. Curtiss cup, and a second prize was awarded to Yankee.

=== Observation ===
During the first two weeks of July 1930, the America's Cup Committee staged a series of observation races to better understand the strengths and weaknesses of the four contenders to defend the cup. The races were conducted by starting the yachts in pairs, with the second pair starting fifteen minutes after the first. The yachts to race in each pair were determined by lot.

In all, ten of these races were staged between July 7 and July 17, although due to weather and mechanical failures, not every race could be completed. A further two races had been scheduled for July 18 and 19 but were not conducted.

The first four races proceeded without incident, with Weetamoe recording four wins, Enterprise two, and Whirlwind and Yankee one each.

In the fifth race, on July 11, Enterprise and Weetamoe competed in the first division. During the first leg of the race, Weetamoe's mainsail failed, forcing her to withdraw from the race. The committee then signalled Enterprise to withdraw as well, thereby granting Enterprise a technical victory.

The sixth race, on July 12, was marred by very light winds. The start time was delayed by 2½ hours before there was even enough wind for the competitors to get underway, and when Enterprise and Whirlwind started in the second division, the yachts of the first division were less than a mile ahead. By the time Enterprise rounded the second mark, she was ahead of not only Whirlwind, but the other two yachts as well. The America's Cup rules of the time specified that if neither boat in a race had finished the course in 5½ hours, the race would be declared void. Therefore, on this day, the first division race was voided for this reason: Weetamoe crossed the line only after 5 hours 44 minutes, leading Yankee, which was awarded a "did not finish". In the second division, Enterprise completed the race with just over 1½ minutes left to spare, meaning that the race was still valid and earning Whirlwind a second place even though she took 6 hours 10 minutes to complete the course.

Weather on the day of race seven, July 14, was quite the opposite: overcast and a 22-knot wind blowing. Enterprise raced Weetamoe in the first division, both yachts with their mailsails reefed. Enterprise's mainsail tore, forcing her to withdraw from the race, and giving Weetamoe a technical victory. Something similar happened in the second division where both yachts were running under full sail: the headboard tore out of Whirlwind's mainsail, forcing her withdrawal and granting technical victory to Yankee. No yacht actually completed the course that day.

The wind died again on the day of race eight, July 15. Whirlwind and Yankee were taking lay days, so only Enterprise and Weetamoe raced. Even so, the wind was so poor that the committee canceled the race after 1½ hours.

Race 9, on July 16, proceeded without incident, but for race 10, on July 17, Whirlwind was once again not available. The Cup Committee therefore decided to hold a three-way race for the other yachts. Other than the participation of an extra competitor, this race was also without incident.

A final two observation races were cancelled.

The end results of the observations were that Enterprise, Weetamoe, and Yankee all finished roughly the same, points-wise (14, 13, and 13 respectively), while Whirlwind had won only a single race and finished with only 8 points. Weetamoe won every race that she had finished.

The results of the races were:

Observation races, July 1930
Date	Course and distance (nautical miles)	Division	Winner	Enterprise's time	Weetamoe's time	Whirlwind's time	Yankee's time
July 7	15 miles, windward and return	1	Weetamoe		3:43:55	3:47:27	
July 7	15 miles, windward and return	2	Yankee	3:51:03			3:49:07
July 8	15 miles, windward and return	1	Whirlwind			3:23:16	3:30:41
July 8	15 miles, windward and return	2	Weetamoe	3:26:13	3:25:47		
July 9	15 miles, windward and return	1	Enterprise	4:00:32		4:08:28	
July 9	15 miles, windward and return	2	Weetamoe		3:56:41		3:58:58
July 10	triangular, 10-mile legs	1	Enterprise	3:11:50			3:12:24
July 10	triangular, 10-mile legs	2	Weetamoe		3:05:19	3:05:54	
July 11	triangular, 10-mile legs	1	Enterprise	dnf (withdrawn, technical victory)	dnf (disabled)		
July 11	triangular, 10-mile legs	2	Yankee		'	3:22:16	3:20:41
July 12	triangular, 10-mile legs	1	(cancelled)		5:44:28		dnf
July 12	triangular, 10-mile legs	2	Enterprise	5:28:03		6:10:27	
July 14	triangular, 10-mile legs	1	Weetamoe	dnf (disabled)	dnf (withdrawn, technical victory)		
July 14	triangular, 10-mile legs	2	Yankee			dnf (disabled)	dnf (withdrawn, technical victory)
July 15	leeward and windward		(cancelled)	dnf	dnf	dns	dns
July 16	triangular, 10-mile legs	1	Weetamoe		3:26:44		3:30:50
July 16	triangular, 10-mile legs	2	Enterprise	3:17:31		3:23:42	
July 17	15 miles, windward and return		Yankee	3:14:09	3:12:16	dns	3:09:08
dns=did not start dnf=did not finish

The points won by the contestants for America's Cup defender during these races were:

Points won in the observation races, July 1930
Boat	Points
Enterprise	13
Weetamoe	14
Whirlwind	8
Yankee	13

=== New York Yacht Club annual cruise ===
From August 2–9, the 1930 annual cruise of the New York Yacht Club offered a final opportunity for the contenders for the defense of the America's Cup to compete with each other prior to the selection trials.

The first leg of the cruise, on August 2, was a 37½-mile race from New London to Newport. At the start of the race, Enterprise signalled a protest that Yankee had fouled her. Following the race, the Race Committee upheld the protest and disqualified Yankee, which had finished last in any case. Weetamoe won this leg, defeating Enterprise by three minutes.

The next leg was raced on August 4, a 31½-mile run from Newport to Mattapoisett. This leg was won by Yankee, with Enterprise again in second place, this time by only 20 seconds. Weetamoe lost about 30 minutes to recovering a man overboard.

On August 5, a special race for the defender candidates was held in Buzzard's Bay on a 21-mile triangular course. This time, Enterprise won, with all four yachts finishing within 5 minutes of each other.

On August 6, participants in the cruise raced 37½ miles from Mattapoisett to Vineyard Haven. Early in the race, Weetamoe fouled Whirlwind, which had to bear away to avoid a collision. Weetamoe immediately withdrew from the race but continued to sail the course in order to reach the next port.

The final port-to-port leg of the cruise was raced the next day, August 7, 37 miles from Vineyard Haven to Newport. Enterprise won this leg, but a few days after the race, a question of rules came up about her use of two spinnakers at one point during the race. All four yachts had been running with spinnakers to starboard, but while maneuvering, Enterprise had raised her port spinnaker before dropping her starboard spinnaker. When asked for a ruling, the Race Committee interpreted the Racing Rules to mean that a yacht could only sail with one spinnaker at a time. On the basis of this determination, Enterprise's crew withdrew her from the race, which then went to Weetamoe.

On August 8, the four contender yachts all participated in the Astor Cup, a 15-mile windward and leeward course. Confusion arose as the yachts approached the finish because they had been instructed to finish with the Newport lightship to starboard, but also to finish between the lightship and the committee boat. However, due to a mechanical failure, the committee boat was anchored in the wrong position, and finishing between it and the lightship would mean finishing with the lightship to port. Weetamoe, in the lead, did just this, but the crew of Enterprise reasoned that the only way to satisfy the course instructions was to round the lightship and cross the finish line from the other direction, which they did and signalled a protest. The Race Committee upheld the protest, and disqualified Weetamoe for not finishing the course, giving the race to Enterprise.

The final race of the cruise was sailed on August 9, the City of Newport Cup. Again, confusion arose, this time because two other races were being held on the same day, and visibility on the course was not good. Whirlwind completely missed one of the marks and continued sailing past it, and Enterprise turned at a buoy that had been set for a different race and lost considerable time getting back on course. The race went to Weetamoe.

The results of the races were:

The New York Yacht Club annual cruise, August 1930
Date	Event	Distance (nautical miles)	Winner	Enterprise's time	Weetamoe's time	Whirlwind's time	Yankee's time
August 2	New London–Newport	37.5	Weetamoe	4:05:50	4:02:45	4:15:31	dq
August 4	Newport–Mattapoisett	31.5	Yankee	2:42:02	3:11:10	2:42:14	2:41:42
August 5	Buzzard's Bay	21	Enterprise	2:27:33	2:30:08	2:32:50	2:30:26
August 6	Mattapoisett–Vineyard Haven	37.5	Enterprise	5:52:46	dnf (withdrew)	6:05:38	5:59:48
August 7	Vineyard Haven–Newport	37	Weetamoe	dnf (withdrew)	4:44:44	4:50:48	4:52:44
August 8	Astor Cup	15	Enterprise	3:28:10	dnf	3:36:44	dnf
August 9	City of Newport Cup	15	Weetamoe	4:46:57	4:37:42	4:49:36	5:03:03
dnf=did not finish dq=disqualified

The points won by the contestants for America's Cup defender during these races were:

Points won in the New York Yacht Club annual cruise, August 1930
Boat	Points
Enterprise	21
Weetamoe	16
Whirlwind	15
Yankee	12

== Trials ==
Formal trials between the four contenders commenced on August 20, "to continue until the Cup Committee had selected a Defender for the America's Cup". The contenders were to race in pairs, the second division starting 15 minutes after the first division, as in the observation races.

The first race was to be a 30-mile leeward-and-windward course. In the first division, Enterprise and Weetamoe raced neck-and-neck throughout the race and finished only 31 seconds apart, with Enterprise the winner. Yankee won the second division after Whirlwind became disabled.

The second race, the next day, was a 30-mile triangular course, with the yachts in the same divisions as in the first race. The wind was strong and Weetamoe sailed with her mainsail reefed. A mechanical failure aboard Enterprise nearly forced her to withdraw, but Burgess was aboard and was able to devise a jury-rigged repair to keep her in the race. Even so, Enterprise won her division, and in doing so, also the all-time record for the 30-mile course that had been set by Columbia in 1901. Enterprise's record stood for about 13 minutes before being broken again by Yankee winning the second division.

Trial races on August 25 and 26 were both abandoned when the contenders lay becalmed at the start line for hours.

A final trial race was attempted on August 27, with Weetamoe racing Whirlwind in division 1 and Enterprise racing Whirlwind in division 2 on a 30-mile leeward-and-return course. However, during the race, the wind died and with no hope of the yachts completing the course within the 5½-hour time limit, the Race Committee called off the race.

That same evening, the America's Cup Committee informed the afterguard of Enterprise that their yacht had been selected to defend the cup.

The results of the trial races were:

America's Cup trial races, August 1930
Date	Course and distance (nautical miles)	Division	Winner	Enterprise's time	Weetamoe's time	Whirlwind's time	Yankee's time
August 20	15 miles, windward and return	1	Enterprise	4:22:14	4:23:20	3:47:27	
August 20	15 miles, windward and return	2	Yankee	3:51:03		dnf (disabled)	4:21:48
August 21	triangular, 10 miles to a side	1	Enterprise	2:49:20	2:52:28		
August 21	triangular, 10 miles to a side	2	Yankee			2:54:48	2:47:59
August 27	30 miles, leeward and return	1			cancelled	cancelled	
August 27	30 miles, leeward and return	2		cancelled			cancelled

The points won by the contestants for America's Cup defender during these races were:

Points won in the America's Cup trial races, August 1930
Boat	Points
Enterprise	4
Weetamoe	2
Whirlwind	1
Yankee	4

== Competition ==
The first race between Shamrock V and Enterprise took place on September 13, a 15-mile leeward-and-windward course. The start was postponed by an hour due to lack of wind. The race was uneventful, other than the Coast Guard having to move some sightseeing steamers so as not to cut the wind for the race. Enterprise won by almost three minutes.

The second race, on September 15, was a triangular course, 10 miles to each leg. This proved to be an even more decisive victory for Enterprise, of nearly 10 minutes.

The third race, on September 17, 15 miles windward and return, was the most eventful of the series. The way in which Shamrock V maneuvered at the start of the race raised several questions under the Racing Rules. However, trusting that Enterprise was the faster yacht anyway under the prevailing conditions, her crew chose simply to remain clear of Shamrock V and not risk a protest. The point became academic anyway, when 44 minutes into the race, Shamrock V's main halyard broke, causing her mainsail to collapse and forcing her to withdraw from the race. Enterprise went on to complete the course and secure a victory.

The fourth race, on September 18, was again a triangular course, 10 miles to each leg. Enterprise established an early lead of nine minutes on the first leg. Although Shamrock V was able to close that lead to only five minutes by the end of the race, she still finished around half a mile behind Enterprise. Lipton was heard to say "I can't win, I can't win" Having won four races, Enterprise had successfully defended the America's Cup.

The results of the four races were:

America's Cup races, September 1930
Date	Course and distance (nautical miles)	Winner	Enterprise's time	Shamrock V's time
September 13	15 miles, leeward and return	Enterprise	4:03:48	4:06:40
September 15	triangular, 10 miles a side	Enterprise	4:00:44	4:10:18
September 17	15 miles windward and return	Enterprise	3:54:16	dnf (disabled)
September 18	triangular, 10 miles a side	Enterprise	3:10:13	3:15:57

== Bibliography ==
- Dear, Ian (2004). Enterprise to Endeavour: the J-Class Yachts. London: Adlard Coles Nautical.
- D'Antonio, Michael (2010). A Full Cup: Sir Thomas Lipton's Extraordinary Life and His Quest for the America's Cup. New York: Riverhead Books.
- "The Yachts: Enterprise". The National Iron & Steel Heritage Museum. Coatesville, PA. n.d.
- Rayner, Ranulf (2022). The Story of the America's Cup 1851–2021. Illustrated by Tim Thompson. Woodbridge: ACC Art Books.
- Vanderbilt, Harold Stirling (1931). Enterprise: The Story of the Defense of the America's Cup in 1930. New York: Charles Scribner's Sons.
