= Shamrock V =

British racing yacht

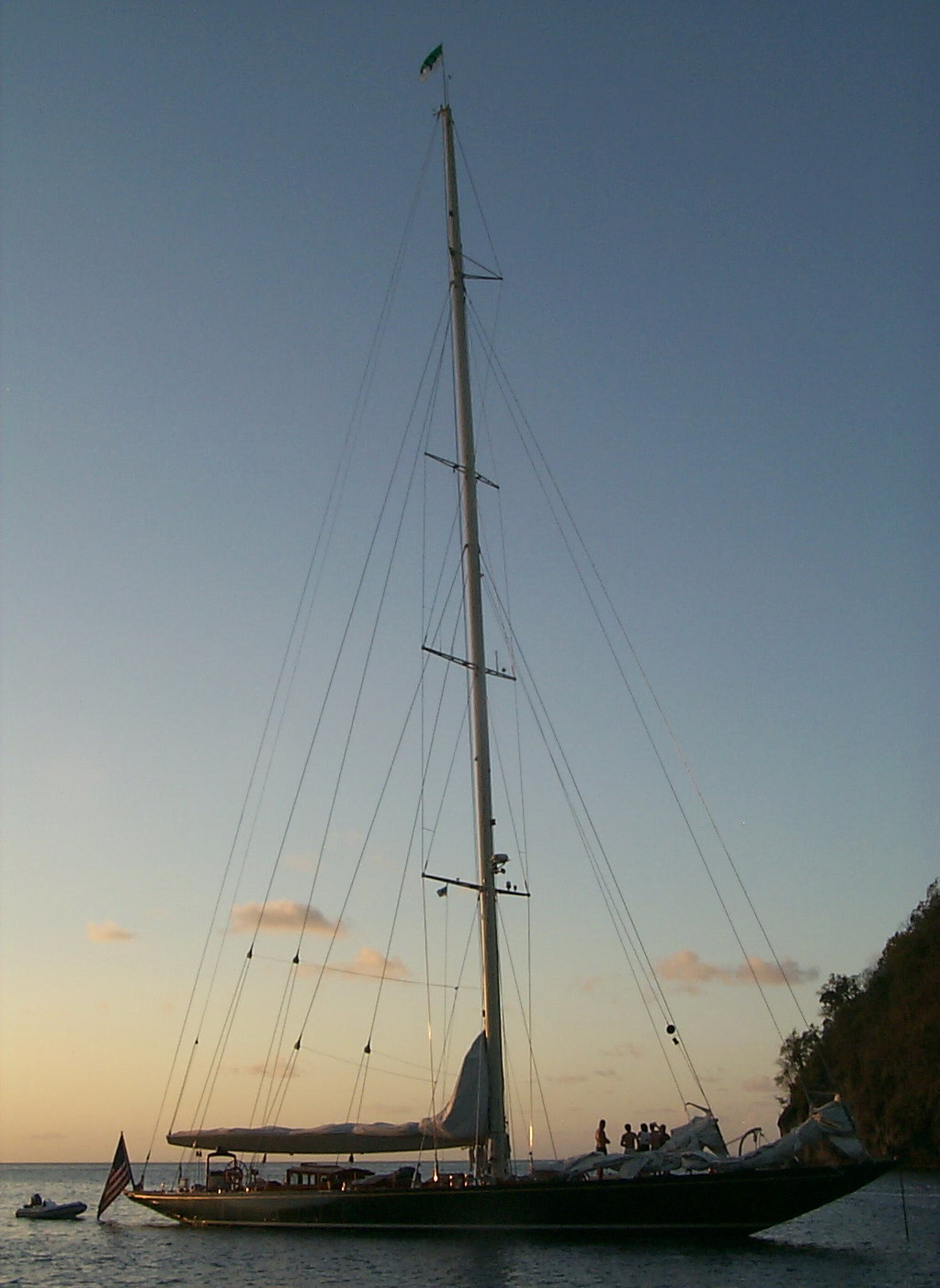
- Shamrock V at Marigot Bay, St Lucia, 26 March 2002
- Yacht club: Royal Ulster Yacht Club
- Nation: United Kingdom
- Class: J-class
- Designer(s): Charles Ernest Nicholson
- Builder: Camper & Nicholson
- Launched: 14 April 1930
- Owner(s): Sir Thomas Lipton; Sir Thomas Sopwith 1931; Sir Richard Fairey 1934; Mario Crespi 1937; Piero Scanu 1962; Lipton Tea Company 1986; Newport Museum of Yachting; Int'l Yacht Restoration School 1995; Newport Shamrock V Corp. 1998

Specifications
- Type: Monohull
- Displacement: 134 long tons (136 metric tonnes)
- Length: 119 ft 10 ins (36.5 m) overall; 81 ft 1 in (24.7 m) at waterline
- Beam: 19 ft 8 in (6.0 m)
- Draft: 14 ft 8 in (4.47 m)
- Sail area: 7,540 sq.ft (700.5 m^{2})

Shamrock V is a British J-class yacht. She was the first British yacht to be built to the new J-Class rule. She was commissioned by Sir Thomas Lipton for his fifth America's Cup challenge. Although refitted several times, Shamrock is the only original J-class never to have fallen into dereliction.

== Origins ==
The services of Charles Ernest Nicholson were once again employed to design the challenger and she was constructed at the Camper and Nicholsons yard in Gosport. Shamrock V was built from wood, with mahogany planking over steel frames and, most significantly, a hollow spruce mast. As a result of rule changes, she was the first British contender for the America's Cup to carry the Bermuda rig. Following her launch on 14 April 1930 she showed early promise on the British Regatta circuit winning 15 of 22 races and placing second in an additional four. She also underwent continuous upgrading with changes to her hull shape, rudder, and modifications to the rig to create a more effective racing sail plan before departing to America in time for the 15th America's Cup.

Four New York syndicates responded to Lipton's challenge each creating a J-Class, Weetamoe, Yankee, Whirlwind, and Enterprise. This was a remarkable response, particularly during depression-hit America with each yacht costing at least half a million dollars, and served to highlight that despite the J-Class' immense power and beauty, their Achilles heel would be the exorbitant cost to construct and race them. Winthrop Aldrick's syndicate, Enterprise, emerged from the competitive round-robins as the eventual defender.

Enterprise was the smallest J-Class to be built, her size being an early indication of the ruthless efficiency that was employed by the renowned naval architect Starling Burgess. The efficiency of design was coupled to a number of pioneering features such as the Park Avenue Boom, hidden lightweight winches and the world's first duralumin mast.

== America's Cup ==
The first of the best-of-seven races was a convincing victory for Enterprise winning by nearly three minutes. Shamrock V was to fare worse in the second race losing by nearly 10 minutes. The third race finally provided the assembled thousands on the shore at Newport, the racing they craved. Shamrock V's initial lead at the start was relinquished to Enterprise after a tacking duel. Following this surrender disaster struck, as Shamrock V's main halyard parted and her sail collapsed to the deck. The fourth race clinched the cup for Enterprise after which Sir Thomas Lipton was heard to utter "I can't win".

Shamrock V's challenge was plagued by bad luck and haunted by one of the most ruthless skippers in America's Cup history, Harold Vanderbilt. Sir Thomas Lipton, after endearing himself to the American public during 31 years and five attempts, would die the following year never fulfilling his ambition to win the cup.

== Post Cup Career ==
The British aviation industrialist Sir Thomas Sopwith was to be the next custodian of Shamrock V. Already a keen yachtsman, Sopwith bought her in 1931 as a trial horse to gain J-Class racing experience. He would also add to Nicholson's skills with his own aeronautical expertise and material knowledge to build and perfect his challenger for the 16th America's cup, Endeavour.

Shamrock V was then sold to Sopwith's aviation friend, and fellow yachtsman, Sir Richard Fairey of Fairey Aviation who continued to incorporate aerodynamic and hydrodynamic modifications. These included a new mast and mainsail fitted before the 1934 season, in which she competed simply as Shamrock. In the "Big Class" that year, she sailed against Astra, HMY Britannia, Candida, Endeavour, and Velsheda.

In the 1935 regatta season, she campaigned against Velsheda, Endeavour, and Yankee. In 1937, Shamrock V was sold to the Italian senator and industrialist Mario Crespi. This change in ownership prompted Shamrock V's only name change. Italian Fascist law had banned the use of foreign names in society, accordingly Shamrock V was renamed Quadrifoglio (cloverleaf). Crespi was also the first owner who modified Shamrock V for comfort by installing her maple interior.

A renaissance for Shamrock V began in 1962 with her acquisition by the Italian yachtsman Piero Scanu. He instigated a comprehensive three-year overhaul commencing in 1967. In 1974, the yacht was used in the production of the movie Swept Away. But by now further repairs were essential.

In November 1974 a small delivery crew sailed a not fully seaworthy Shamrock V from Toulon, France to Southampton, England, a journey of more than 2000 miles, for a full re-fit. On two occasions the 160-feet wooden mast, 15 feet less than her 1930 height, was almost lost. On 21 November a jury-rigged Shamrock sailed into Southampton to an enthusiastic welcome from the yachting community.

Back in Camper and Nicholson's yard, the hull and deck received significant attention, along with the modernisation of the systems and engines. The effects of this rebuild were to last the next twenty years during which a remarkable repeat of history was enacted when, in 1986, Shamrock V returned to the ownership of the Lipton Tea Company who donated her to the Museum of Yachting at Newport, Rhode Island. Another extensive restoration was instigated by her new owners and undertaken by Elizabeth Meyer in 1989.

Following changes of ownership in the 1990s and another renovation, Shamrock V participated in a reunion in August 2001 with the only two remaining J-Classes, Endeavour, and Velsheda, for the America's Cup Jubilee in the Solent. In March 2016 it was reported that Shamrock V had changed ownership and had been listed for sale with an asking price of €6 million.

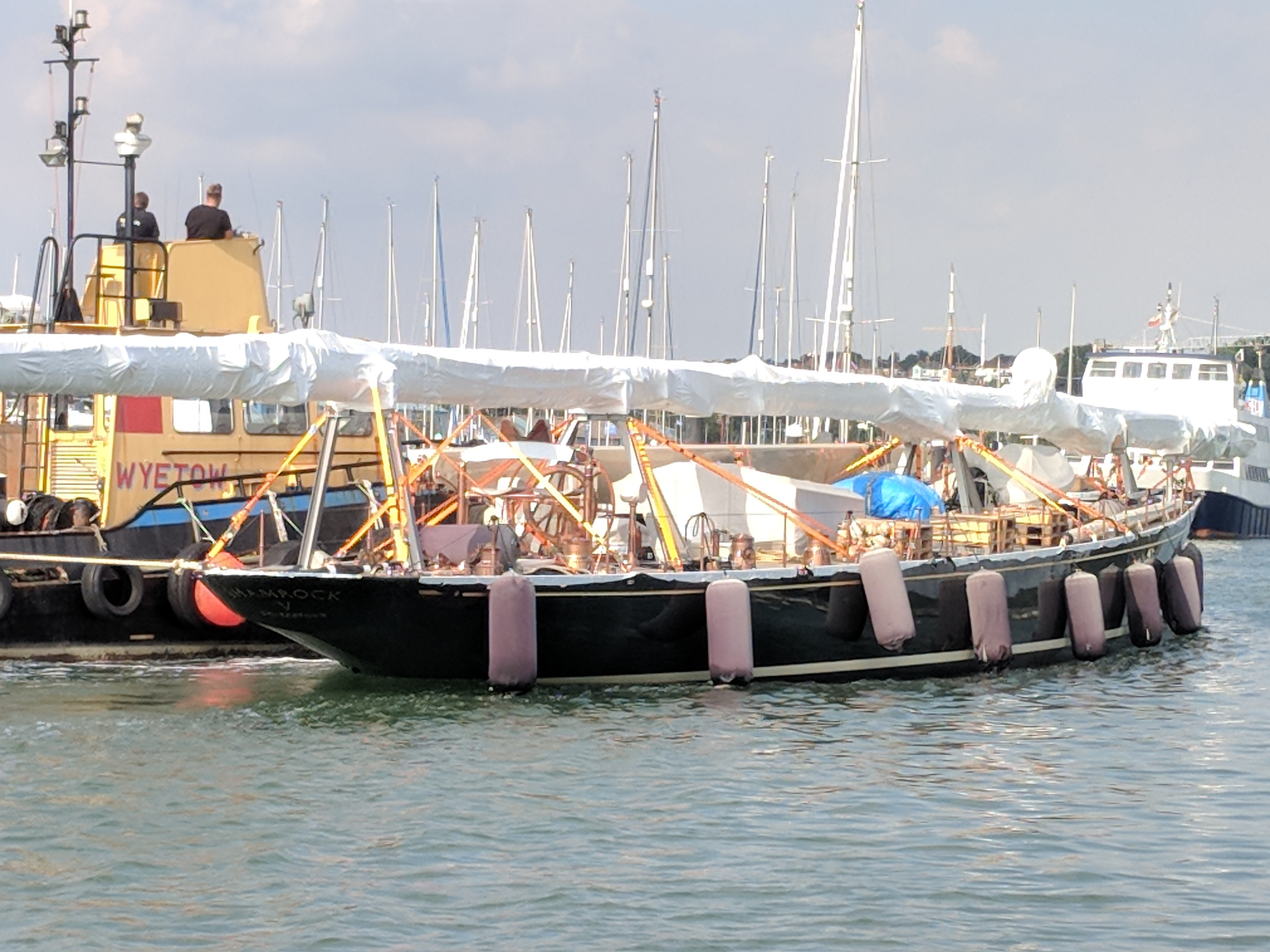
Shamrock V in the Itchen, July 2018

== Bibliography ==
- Dear, Ian (2004). Enterprise to Endeavour: the J-Class Yachts. London: Adlard Coles Nautical.
- Vanderbilt, Harold Stirling (1931). Enterprise: The Story of the Defense of the America's Cup in 1930. New York: Charles Scribner's Sons.
