= Yankee (yacht) =

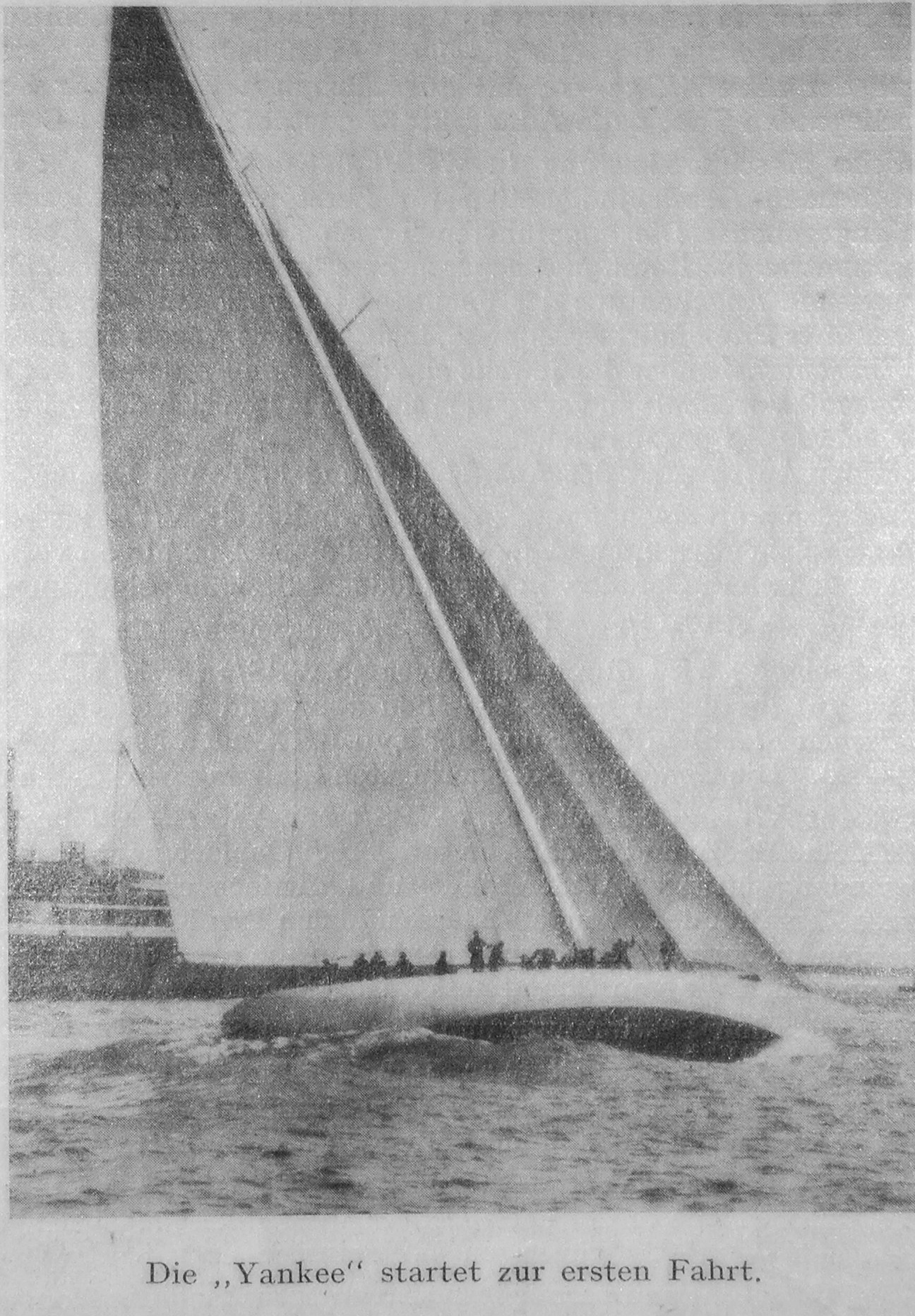
- Yankee in 1935.
- Yacht club: New York Yacht Club
- Class: J-class
- Sail no: US–2
- Designer(s): Frank Cabot Paine
- Builder: Lawley & Son’s yard Neponset (Dorchester), MA, USA
- Launched: May 10, 1930
- Owner(s): Boston–Marblehead Syndicate, a.k.a. the Eastern Yacht Club Syndicate
- Fate: Scrapped in 1941

Racing career
- Skippers: Charles F. Adams
- AC Defender Selection Series: 1930 America's Cup Defender Selections Series; 1934 America's Cup Defender Selections Series; 1937 America's Cup Defender Selections Series

Specifications
- Displacement: 148 long tons (150 metric tonnes)
- Length: 125 ft (38.1 m) overall; 84 ft (25.6 m) at waterline
- Beam: 22 ft 4 in (6.8 m)
- Draft: 15 ft 3 in (4.64 m)
- Sail area: 7,550 sq.ft (701.4 m^{2})

Yankee was a 1930 yacht of the J Class built as a contender for the New York Yacht Club's defence of the 1930 America's Cup. She was ordered by a syndicate from the Eastern Yacht Club of Boston, organized by John Silsbee Lawrence, designed by Frank Cabot Paine, and built by Lawley & Son. Whirlwind was unsuccessful in her bid to become the Cup defender, an honor that went to Enterprise. With modifications, she took part in the trials for the 1934 America's Cup. She was eventually taken to the United Kingdom by a new owner in 1935 and was scrapped in 1941.

== Design and development ==
When the New York Yacht Club accepted Sir Thomas Lipton's challenge for the America's cup, they decided to form two syndicates to build one yacht each for the defense of the cup, and also to welcome other syndicates who might want to offer a defender. The Eastern Yacht Club put forward one such syndicate as the "Boston–Marblehead Syndicate", organized by John Silsbee Lawrence and comprising:

- Charles F. Adams
- Chandler Hovey
- John Lawrence
- Frank Cabot Paine

Her construction was of steel frames and deck beams, with wooden decks and a hull was built from very expensive Tobin bronze. Her launch was delayed because she was being built behind and in the same shed as Whirlwind, another contender for the defense of the Cup. Inspectors from Lloyd's required significant structural changes to that boat, which in turn blocked Yankee's completion. She was eventually launched on May 10.

=== Support vessels ===
The syndicate also obtained several support craft for Weetamoe. These included:

- the barge Dandie
- two powerboats, Doodle and Gypsy

=== Crew ===
Under the Racing Rules, yachts were allowed a total crew of 31, including any afterguard. The afterguard comprised:

- Charles F. Adams (skipper)
- Chandler Hovey
- John Lawrence
- Frank Paine (designer)

The syndicate engaged a Mr. Olsen as their sailing master, and a professional crew of Scandinavian origin.

== The Long Island Sound series ==
On June 9, the contenders, together with the J-class yachts Resolute and Vanitie, met at Glen Cove for a series of races planned in Long Island Sound by the local clubs.

Of the series, Weetamoe won three out of four races, with the other going to Enterprise. Yankee arrived too late to compete in any but the fourth and last race.

== The Eastern Yacht Club races ==
The following week, the J-class boats traveled to Newport for three races organized by the Eastern Yacht Club.

Enterprise won all three of these races. Weetamoe recorded the fastest time in the first race, but withdrew after fouling Enterprise.

As winner of the races, Enterprise was awarded the Commodore Charles P. Curtiss cup, and a second prize was awarded to Yankee.

== Observation ==
During the first two weeks of July 1930, the America's Cup Committee staged a series of observation races to better understand the strengths and weaknesses of the four contenders to defend the cup. The races were conducted by starting the yachts in pairs, with the second pair starting fifteen minutes after the first. The yachts to race in each pair were determined by lot.

The end results of the observations were that Enterprise, Weetamoe, and Yankee all finished roughly the same, points-wise (14, 13, and 13 respectively), while Whirlwind had won only a single race and finished with only 8 points. Weetamoe won every race that she had finished.

Enterprise and Weetamoe each scored a technical victory over the other when their competitor could not finish a race. Likewise, Yankee scored a technical victory over Whirlwind.

== New York Yacht Club annual cruise ==
From August 2–9, the 1930 annual cruise of the New York Yacht Club offered a final opportunity for the contenders for the defense of the America's Cup to compete with each other prior to the selection trials. The cruise consisted of several port-to=-port legs, interspersed with races over set courses.

Enterprise and Weetamoe each won three races, and Yankee won one. As part of this cruise, Enterprise won the Astor Cup and Weetamoe won the City of Newport Cup.

== 1930 America's Cup trials ==
Formal trials between the four contenders commenced on August 20. The contenders were to race in pairs, the second division starting 15 minutes after the first division, as in the observation races.

Due to poor winds, only two trial races were held, both won by Enterprise against Weetamoe. Whirlwind was disabled in one of her races against Yankee.

On the evening of August 27, the America's Cup Committee informed the afterguard of Enterprise that their yacht had been selected to defend the cup.

== 1934 America's Cup trials ==
For the 1934 America's Cup trials, Yankee's rig was modified to carry more sail, and her bow was lengthened and given more of a V-shape.

== Fate ==
Following her racing career, Yankee was purchased in 1935 by Gerald Lambert and taken across the Atlantic to the United Kingdom.

Yankee was scrapped in 1941. Lambert donated the money from her scrapping to Queen Mother, Mary of Teck for use in the London Hospital.

== Bibliography ==
- Dear, Ian (2004). Enterprise to Endeavour: the J-Class Yachts. London: Adlard Coles Nautical.
- Garland, Joseph E. (1989). The Eastern Yacht Club: A History from 1870 to 1985. Marblehead, MA: The Eastern Yacht Club.
- "The Yachts: Enterprise". The National Iron & Steel Heritage Museum. Coatesville, PA: The National Iron & Steel Heritage Museum. n.d.
- Vanderbilt, Harold Stirling (1931). Enterprise: The Story of the Defense of the America's Cup in 1930. New York: Charles Scribner's Sons.
