= Enterprise (yacht) =

- Class: J-class
- Sail no: 4
- Designer(s): Starling Burgess
- Builder: Herreshoff Manufacturing Company
- Launched: April 14, 1930
- Owner(s): Winthrop Aldrich syndicate
- Fate: Scrapped in 1935

Racing career
- Skippers: Harold Vanderbilt
- Notable victories: 1930 America's Cup
- America's Cup: 1930 America's Cup

Specifications
- Displacement: 128 long tons (130 metric tonnes)
- Length: 120 ft 9 in (36.80 m) overall; 80 ft (24 m) at waterline
- Beam: 22 ft 1 in (6.73 m)
- Draft: 14 ft 6 in (4.42 m)
- Sail area: 7,583 sq.ft (704.5 m^{2})

Enterprise was a 1930 yacht of the J Class and successful defender of the 1930 America's Cup for the New York Yacht Club. It was ordered by a syndicate headed by Vice-Commodore Winthrop Aldrich, designed by Starling Burgess, and built by Herreshoff Manufacturing Company.

She was named Enterprise in honor of the six commissioned warships of the United States Navy to have borne the name up to that time (see List of ships of the United States Navy named Enterprise for details), but in particular, the third of these ships. This had been a 12-gun schooner built in 1799 which saw action in the Quasi-War with France and in the First Barbary War against Tripolitania. Refitted as a brig in 1811, she fought in the War of 1812 where she captured the British brig HMS Boxer. For all these exploits, she had earned the nickname "Lucky Enterprise". Rear-Commodore Junius Morgan presented Aldrich with a model of this famous Enterprise, and the yacht sailed with this model prominently displayed in the captain's cabin.

== Design and development ==
When the New York Yacht Club accepted Sir Thomas Lipton's challenge for the America's cup, they decided to form two syndicates to build one yacht each for the defense of the cup, and also to welcome other syndicates who might want to offer a defender. The two NYYC syndicates were to be led by Vice-Commodore Winthrop Aldrich and Rear-Commodore Junius Morgan.

Aldrich's syndicate comprised:

- Winthrop Aldrich
- Vincent Astor
- George F. Baker
- Floyd L. Carlisle
- E. Walter Clarke
- Harold Vanderbilt
- George Whitney

The syndicate named Harold S. Vanderbilt as their captain and engaged Starling Burgess to design their yacht and Herreshoff Manufacturing Company to build it. Vanderbilt proposed that Burgess base his design on an enlarged version of the M-class sloop Prestige that Burgess had previously designed for Vanderbilt. However, when Burgess presented two models of an 80-foot sloop design to the syndicate for consideration in August, neither of them resembled Prestige. The syndicate members unanimously selected one of the two designs as the basis for their defender.

The precise waterline length of the yacht was fixed after analysis of historical meteorological data to predict the likely wind conditions during the races, followed by experiments with a 15-foot (4.6-metre) 544-pound (247 kg) model hull at the Naval Model Basin, based on the selected design. Using data from these tests, Burgess calculated the drag on the hull design as it was progressively scaled up at one-foot increments from 78 feet to 87 feet at the waterline (the J-class specification allowed for waterline lengths between 75 feet and 87 feet). By this method, he determined the minimum drag under predicted conditions would be generated with the hull scaled to a waterline length 80 feet.

To maximise sail area, Enterprise's mast was designed to the maximum height allowable under the Racing Rules: 152 feet 6 inches (46.48 m). Based on this mast height, a boom length of 66 feet 6 inches (20.27 m) was selected after consultation with George Ratsey, of sail-making firm Ratsey & Lapthorn. Three masts were constructed for comparison: two wooden masts of different design from Nevins, and an innovative twelve-sided duralumin mast from aircraft builders Glenn L. Martin Company. The duralumin mast was 600 pounds (270 kg) lighter than the lighter of the two wooden masts, and 1,000 pounds (450 kg) lighter than the heavier of them.

Burgess suggested using 19-strand wire for Enterprise's rigging, to achieve a 33% saving in weight. This required the development of new fittings for the ends of the lines, because the wire could not be spliced. The result was a fitting called "Tru-loc", developed for this project by the American Cable Company.

Sails, including four mainsails, were ordered from Ratsey & Lapthorn.

Enterprise's winches came mostly from Resolute, the 1920 America's Cup defender, except for three that were still in use aboard her. In turn, some of these winches had previously been used aboard Reliance, the 1903 defender. They were donated to the syndicate by its member Commodore Walter Clark, who had purchased Reliance in 1925. The three replacement winches were ordered from Herreshoff, who had also manufactured the winches for those two yachts.

Her construction was of steel frames and deck beams, with wooden decks and a hull was built from very expensive Tobin bronze. It is estimated that she cost $1 million to build (nearly $18 million in 2022 dollars).

The syndicate placed their order to build Enterprise with Herreshoff on August 1, 1929, who gave the project the construction number 1146.

Enterprise was launched at 8 am on April 14, 1930, and christened by her sponsor, Harriet Aldrich. Rhode Island Governor Norman S. Case attended the launch.

=== Support vessels ===
The syndicate also obtained several support craft for Enterprise. These included:

- Vanderbilt's own motor-yacht Vara, for living quarters for the afterguard
- Corona, which had been built as Colonia to unsuccessfully compete against Vigilant to become the America's Cup defender in 1893. She was refitted to serve as Enterprise's mothership, providing living quarters for her crew, and storage for her sails and rigging.
- Mut, an old pilot boat fitted with a single-cylinder engine to act as a crew ferry
- Bystander, a specially-built 42-foot, 175-hp motorboat to act as a tender and to tow Enterprise and Corona as needed. She was commissioned from Greenport Basin and Construction Company.

=== Crew ===
Under the Racing Rules, yachts were allowed a total crew of 31, including any afterguard. The afterguard comprised:

- Winthrop Aldrich
- Harold Vanderbilt
- Starling Burgess
- Charles "Bubbles" Havemeyer
- C. Sherman Hoyt

With these five, it left a crew of 26 to sail Enterprise. The syndicate engaged:

- Sailing master George Monsell
- First mate Harry Klefve
- Second mate Adolph Nelson
- Third mate Oli Larsen

Monsell was delegated to assemble the rest of his crew, some of whom had sailed on Resolute in 1920. The crew was mustered in April 1930.

== Testing ==
Enterprise sailed for the first time on April 19, 1930, with her full crew and a number of guests. From then until May 9, she was taken out almost daily, and on increasingly long and demanding sails.

Beginning on May 10, Walter Clark had arranged for his yacht Resolute to race against Enterprise to better evaluate the new yacht's characteristics and provide training for her crew. Before the first of these races, a Mrs Churchman of Philadelphia, a friend of Clark's, presented the crew of Enterprise with a hamsa that became the boat's mascot and was fixed to the side of the navigator's cockpit. Three days later, Enterprise began to practice against Vanitie as well.

These mock races were of particular significance because of a prevailing opinion that the sturdier and heavier build of Enterprise and other J-class boats would inevitably make them slower than the previous generation of yachts. This opinion was soon disproved by Enterprise's performance in May as set out in the table below:

Test races of Enterprise against Resolute and Vanitie, May 1930
Date	Distance (nautical miles)	Competitor	Winner	Enterprise's time	Competitor's time
May 10	25.8	Resolute	Enterprise	3:25:00	3:29:08
May 12	22	Resolute	Enterprise	2:39:45	2:49:00
May 13	9.6	Vanitie	Enterprise	2:31:00	2:33:26
May 16	32	Resolute	Enterprise	3:39:24	3:51:10
May 17	22	Resolute and Vanitie	Enterprise	2:29:40	2:37:02 (Resolute); 2:38:25 (Vanitie)
May 21		Resolute	abandoned due to weather		
May 22		Resolute and Vanitie	abandoned due to weather		
May 29	29.5	Resolute	Enterprise	4:10:10	4:37:20

All but the last of these mock races had taken place at Long Island Sound. On May 23, Enterprise had relocated to Newport, and the final race against Resolute was carried out there. They had all been carried out with the heavier of Enterprise's wooden masts, and on June 2, her duralumin mast was fitted for the first time, and tested the next day.

== The Long Island Sound series ==
On June 9, Enterprise returned to Glen Cove for a series of races planned in Long Island Sound by the local clubs. Here she first raced against the three other yachts built as contenders to defend the America's Cup: Weetamoe, Whirlwind, and Yankee. They were joined by Resolute and Vanitie. During this series, Enterprise raced with her light wooden mast.

Of the series, Weetamoe won three out of four races, with the other going to Enterprise. Yankee arrived too late to compete in any but the fourth and last race.

This series convinced Burgess, and later Vanderbilt, that Whirlwind and Yankee were not a serious threat to Enterprise due to their longer waterline lengths.

== The Eastern Yacht Club races ==
The following week, the J-class boats traveled to Newport for three races organized by the Eastern Yacht Club.

Enterprise won all three of these races. Weetamoe recorded the fastest time in the first race, but withdrew after fouling Enterprise.

As winner of the races, Enterprise was awarded the Commodore Charles P. Curtiss cup, and a second prize was awarded to Yankee.

Following the races, on July 26, Enterprise was nearly wrecked twice in one day while practicing near Jamestown: first when caught in an ebb tide that nearly carried her onto the Dumpling Rocks, then when a mechanical failure with her rigging nearly forced her aground in the Narrows. In the former incident, a launch from cruiser USS Detroit nearby came to assist, but the danger had already passed.

On July 2, Enterprise was fitted with her duralumin mast again.

== Observation ==
During the first two weeks of July 1930, the America's Cup Committee staged a series of observation races to better understand the strengths and weaknesses of the four contenders to defend the cup. The races were conducted by starting the yachts in pairs, with the second pair starting fifteen minutes after the first. The yachts to race in each pair were determined by lot.

The end results of the observations were that Enterprise, Weetamoe, and Yankee all finished roughly the same, points-wise (14, 13, and 13 respectively), while Whirlwind had won only a single race and finished with only 8 points. Weetamoe won every race that she had finished.

Enterprise and Weetamoe each scored a technical victory over the other when their competitor could not finish a race. Likewise, Yankee scored a technical victory over Whirlwind.

== New York Yacht Club annual cruise ==
From August 2–9, the 1930 annual cruise of the New York Yacht Club offered a final opportunity for the contenders for the defense of the America's Cup to compete with each other prior to the selection trials. The cruise consisted of several port-to=-port legs, interspersed with races over set courses.

Enterprise and Weetamoe each won three races, and Yankee won one. As part of this cruise, Enterprise won the Astor Cup and Weetamoe won the City of Newport Cup.

== "Park Avenue" boom and new rudder ==
One further refinement to Enterprise came in an innovative boom design by Burgess. The optimum profile for a sail is curved, like an airfoil, but in the Marconi rigs of the day, the foot of the mainsail was fixed all along its length to the rigid, straight boom. As a result, the lowest third of the sail — and the part with the greatest surface area — was flattened and therefore not used to its greatest advantage.

Burgess' solution was to commission a very wide boom, 4 feet (1.2 metres) across, tapered at both ends and triangular in cross section. The boom was mounted with a flat side upwards, and this surface had transverse metal tracks laid into it, crossing the boom at 18-inch (46-cm) intervals along its length. Instead of the foot of the mainsail being fastened directly to the boom as in the past, it was attached to slides that were free to move along the tracks from one side of the boom to the other. This mechanism allowed the mainsail to be shaped to maximise its efficiency, and pegs could be inserted into the surface of the boom to constrain the foot of the sail in a particular shape. The crew painted color-coded lines along the boom to indicate the correct peg placement for three different degrees of curvature. The width of the boom earned it the nickname the "Park Avenue boom".

The new boom was fitted on August 10, and tests began the same day. By August 13, the crew was satisfied that Enterprise sailed faster with the new boom, even though it was substantially heavier than a conventional boom (365 lbs, 166 kg; 16% heavier). This impression had been confirmed by scheduled tests against Resolute, and a chance encounter with Yankee while practising.

The final major modification to Enterprise came on August 14, with the fitting of a new rudder with a smoother surface and a substantially smaller area. The smaller rudder reduced Enterprise's wetted area by 1% and therefore reduced drag. The disadvantage was a change in the yacht's handling immediately before the selection trials.

== Trials ==
Formal trials between the four contenders commenced on August 20. The contenders were to race in pairs, the second division starting 15 minutes after the first division, as in the observation races.

Due to poor winds, only two trial races were held, both won by Enterprise against Weetamoe. Whirlwind was disabled in one of her races against Yankee.

On the evening of August 27, the America's Cup Committee informed the afterguard of Enterprise that their yacht had been selected to defend the cup.

== The races for the America's Cup ==
The four races for the America's Cup were largely uneventful, other than Shamrock V having to withdraw from the third race when her main halyard broke.

Having won four races, Enterprise had successfully defended the America's Cup.

== Fate ==
Shortly after the America's Cup competition, Enterprise was dry docked, never to sail again.

By 1931, she was standing at the Herreshoff yard with her mast removed and bow projecting over the fence and sidewalk. A placard had been affixed to her bow, carrying the words "Enterprise, Successful Defender of The America's Cup, 1930".

Enterprise was scrapped in 1935, her metal worth $5,000 (about $109,000 in 2022). Her duralumin mast was donated to the police barracks at Scituate for use as a radio mast.

== Bibliography ==
- "Resolute". America's Cup. Archived from the original on 2012-03-31. "... Resolute was sold to E. Walter Clark a Philadelphia banker and director of a railroad company and NYYC member."
- "1929 - 1937 :: History :: J Class Association". Archived from the original on 2015-01-21.
- Dear, Ian (2004). Enterprise to Endeavour: the J-Class Yachts. London: Adlard Coles Nautical.
- Garland, Joseph E. (1989). The Eastern Yacht Club: A History from 1870 to 1985. Marblehead, MA: The Eastern Yacht Club.
- "The Yachts: Enterprise". The National Iron & Steel Heritage Museum. Coatesville, PA: The National Iron & Steel Heritage Museum. n.d.
- Vanderbilt, Harold Stirling (1931). Enterprise: The Story of the Defense of the America's Cup in 1930. New York: Charles Scribner's Sons.
- "HMCo #1146s Enterprise". The Herreshoff Catalogue Raisonné. 2022.
