= Whirlwind (yacht) =

- Class: J-class
- Sail no: 3
- Designer(s): Lewis Francis Herreshoff
- Builder: Lawley & Son
- Launched: May 7, 1930
- Owner(s): Landon Ketchum Thorne syndicate
- Fate: Scrapped in 1935

Racing career
- Skippers: Landon Ketchum Thorne
- AC Defender Selection Series: 1930 America's Cup Defender Selections Series

Specifications
- Displacement: 158 long tons (160 metric tonnes)
- Length: 130 (39.6 m) overall; 86 ft (26.2 m) at waterline
- Beam: 21 ft 8 in (6.6 m)
- Draft: 15 ft 6 in (4.72 m)
- Sail area: 7,550 sq.ft (701.4 m^{2})

Whirlwind was a 1930 yacht of the J Class built as a contender for the New York Yacht Club's defence of the 1930 America's Cup. She was ordered by a syndicate headed by Landon Ketchum Thorne, designed by Lewis Francis Herreshoff, and built by Lawley & Son. Whirlwind was unsuccessful in her bid to become the Cup defender, an honor that went to Enterprise. She never sailed again after the Cup races, and was scrapped in 1935.

== Design and development ==
When the New York Yacht Club accepted Sir Thomas Lipton's challenge for the America's cup, they decided to form two syndicates to build one yacht each for the defense of the cup, and also to welcome other syndicates who might want to offer a defender. Landon Thorne put forward one such syndicate, comprising:

- Paul Hammond
- Alfred Lee Loomis
- Landon Thorne

Unlike the other contenders for the defence of the cup which had hulls of Tobin bronze, Whirlwind's hull was built from an innovative semi-composite material. The Boston Globe suggested (perhaps jokingly) this was because the competing syndicates had already bought out the available stocks of brass on the market, but Hammond explained that this was not so, and that designer Herreshoff preferred working in wood.

Herreshoff designed Whirlwind with a pointed, "canoe"-style stern, quite different from the other J-class yachts, because he was following the lines of his successful M-class yacht Istalena. Herreshoff also stated that he had tried to incorporate recent learnings from the smaller R-class and Q-class yachts that had been recently built.

Whirlwind also differed from the other J-class boats in that Herreshoff was the only designer to use the maximum allowable length for the hull within the class, 87 feet (27 metres) at the waterline. Clinton Crane, designer of rival Weetamoe, speculated about the degree to which the designs had been influenced by the yachts Resolute and Vanitie, the closest designs to the J-class then afloat, both of which were towards the bottom of the allowable range. Additionally, Whirlwind was equipped with many innovative fittings which had never been tried before, most notably in her steering gear. The Rudder magazine at the time noted, "No Cup yacht of any other racing craft ever carried quite so many new-fangled ideas as L. Francis Herreshoff has installed on the Thorne–Hammond yacht...."

These innovations would prove troublesome. In particular, skipper Paul Hammond described her as "a bitch to steer" and recalled having to swap steering between himself and Landon Thorne after half-an-hour because it was so tiring. On another occasion, he was thrown over the wheel in a strong wind. He also recalled that the mast was relocated six times during the season in an attempt to better balance the boat.

In accepting Lipton's challenge, the NYYC had agreed to a term that the contenders comply with Lloyd's Register scantling rules for structural strength. However, as originally designed, Whirlwind did not meet this requirement, which delayed her construction. Lloyd's inspectors required her to be fitted with a whole new set of lower scantlings. In turn, this delay also affected Yankee, another contender for the defense of the Cup which was being built at the same yard, but which was blocked by Whirlwind in the building shed.

She was eventually launched on May 7, 1930.

=== Support vessels ===
The syndicate also obtained several support craft for Whirlwind. These included:

- the schooner Minas Princess as her tender
- Twister, a powerboat

=== Crew ===
Under the Racing Rules, yachts were allowed a total crew of 31, including any afterguard. The afterguard comprised:

- Paul Hammond (skipper)
- Landon K. Thorne
- W. Chamberlain

The syndicate engaged John Muir as their sailing master, and a professional crew of Scandinavian origin.

== The Long Island Sound series ==
On June 9, the contenders, together with the J-class yachts Resolute and Vanitie, met at Glen Cove for a series of races planned in Long Island Sound by the local clubs.

Of the series, Weetamoe won three out of four races, with the other going to Enterprise. Yankee arrived too late to compete in any but the fourth and last race.

== The Eastern Yacht Club races ==
The following week, the J-class boats traveled to Newport for three races organized by the Eastern Yacht Club.

Enterprise won all three of these races. Weetamoe recorded the fastest time in the first race, but withdrew after fouling Enterprise.

As winner of the races, Enterprise was awarded the Commodore Charles P. Curtis cup, and a second prize was awarded to Yankee.

== Observation ==
During the first two weeks of July 1930, the America's Cup Committee staged a series of observation races to better understand the strengths and weaknesses of the four contenders to defend the cup. The races were conducted by starting the yachts in pairs, with the second pair starting fifteen minutes after the first. The yachts to race in each pair were determined by lot.

The end results of the observations were that Enterprise, Weetamoe, and Yankee all finished roughly the same, points-wise (14, 13, and 13 respectively), while Whirlwind had won only a single race and finished with only 8 points. Weetamoe won every race that she had finished.

Enterprise and Weetamoe each scored a technical victory over the other when their competitor could not finish a race. Likewise, Yankee scored a technical victory over Whirlwind.

== New York Yacht Club annual cruise ==
From August 2–9, the 1930 annual cruise of the New York Yacht Club offered a final opportunity for the contenders for the defense of the America's Cup to compete with each other prior to the selection trials. The cruise consisted of several port-to=-port legs, interspersed with races over set courses.

Enterprise and Weetamoe each won three races, and Yankee won one. As part of this cruise, Enterprise won the Astor Cup and Weetamoe won the City of Newport Cup.

== Trials ==
Formal trials between the four contenders commenced on August 20. The contenders were to race in pairs, the second division starting 15 minutes after the first division, as in the observation races.

Due to poor winds, only two trial races were held, both won by Enterprise against Weetamoe. Whirlwind was disabled in one of her races against Yankee.

On the evening of August 27, the America's Cup Committee informed the afterguard of Enterprise that their yacht had been selected to defend the cup.

== Fate ==
Shortly after the America's Cup competition, Whirlwind was purchased by George M. Pynchon, owner of Istalena. He dry docked her, and she was never to sail again.

Whirlwind was scrapped in 1935.

== Bibliography ==
- Dear, Ian (2004). Enterprise to Endeavour: the J-Class Yachts. London: Adlard Coles Nautical.
- Garland, Joseph E. (1989). The Eastern Yacht Club: A History from 1870 to 1985. Marblehead, MA: The Eastern Yacht Club.
- "The Yachts: Enterprise". The National Iron & Steel Heritage Museum. Coatesville, PA: The National Iron & Steel Heritage Museum. n.d.
- Vanderbilt, Harold Stirling (1931). Enterprise: The Story of the Defense of the America's Cup in 1930. New York: Charles Scribner's Sons.
