= USS Patrol No. 8 =

Patrol vessel of the United States Navy

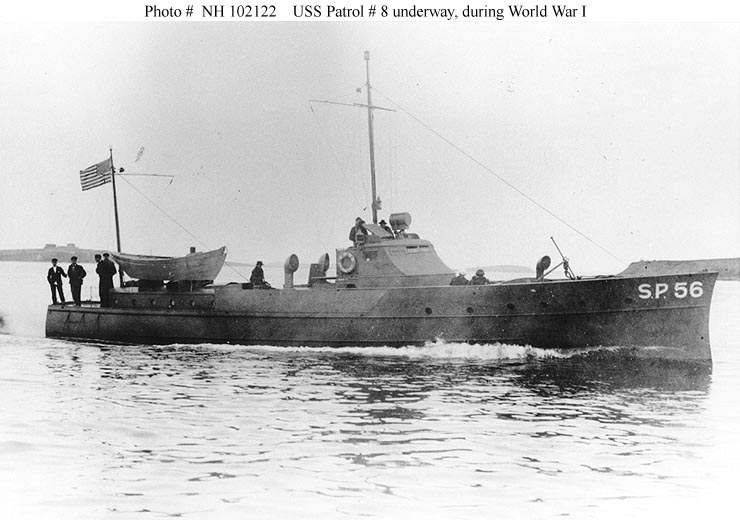
- USS Patrol No. 8 during World War I

History

United States
- Name: USS Patrol No. 8
- Builder: Murray and Tregurthe, Boston, Massachusetts
- Completed: 1916
- Acquired: 10 May 1917
- Commissioned: 11 May 1917
- Fate: Returned to owner 18 February 1919
- Notes: Operated as private motorboat Patrol No. 8 1916-1917

General characteristics
- Type: Patrol vessel
- Tonnage: 40 tons
- Length: 72 ft 0 in (21.95 m)
- Beam: 12 ft 9 in (3.89 m)
- Draft: 5 ft 9 in (1.75 m)
- Speed: 31 knots
- Complement: 10
- Armament: 1 × 3-pounder gun; 1 × 1-pounder gun

USS Patrol No. 8 (SP-56), often rendered as USS Patrol #8, was an armed motorboat that served in the United States Navy as a patrol vessel from 1917 to 1919.

Patrol No. 8 was built as a private motorboat of the same name in 1916 by Murray and Tregurthe at Boston, Massachusetts. The U.S. Navy leased Patrol No. 8 from her owner, millionaire Harold Stirling Vanderbilt of New York City, on 10 May 1917 and commissioned her for service in World War I as USS Patrol No. 8 (SP-56) on 11 May 1917. Coincidentally, at this same time, Vanderbilt, a Naval Reserve officer, was ordered to active duty and given command the Patrol No. 8.

Patrol No. 8 operated in the 2nd Naval District, headquartered at Newport, Rhode Island, and served throughout the United States' participation in World War I. She was decommissioned postwar and returned to her owner on 18 February 1919.
