= J Class (yacht) =

Class of racing yachts

1930s sail plan of a J Class yacht

The J Class of racing yachts were built to the specifications of Nathanael Herreshoff's Universal Rule. The J Class is considered the apex of the era when the Universal Rule determined eligibility in the America's Cup.

With boats costing $10-20 million to build and yearly upkeep around $3 million, J Class racing has been described as the "most expensive hobby on Earth".

== Universal Rule ==
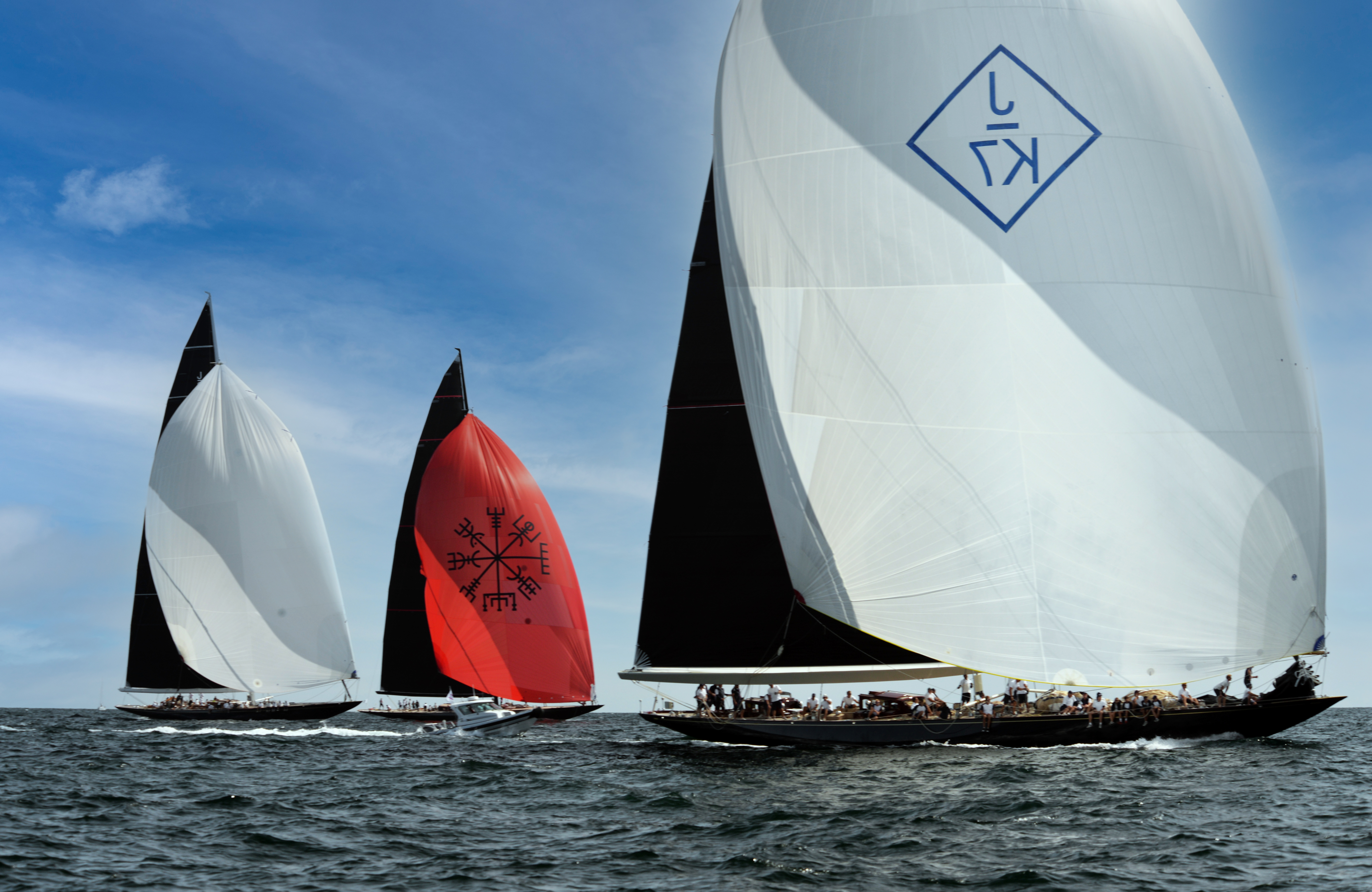
J Class yachts Velsheda, Topaz and Svea downwind legs

The J Class is one of several classes deriving from the Universal Rule for racing boats. The rule was established in 1903 and rates double-masted racers (classes A through H) and single-masted racers (classes I through S). From 1914 to 1937, the rule was used to determine eligibility for the Americas Cup. In the late 1920s, the trend was towards smaller boats and so agreement among American yacht clubs led to rule changes such that after 1937 the International Rule would be used for 12 Metre class boats.

=== Universal Rule formula ===
The Universal Rule formula is: $R=\frac {0.18 \cdot L \cdot \sqrt{S}} {\sqrt[3]{D}}$

Where:

  - $L$ is boat length (a number itself derived from a formula that includes Length at the Waterline L.W.L in feet)
  - $S$ is sail area
  - $D$ is displacement
  - $R$ is rating
  - Herreshoff initially proposed an index of .2 but ratifying committees of the various yacht clubs changed this to, at various times, .18 or .185. This is, essentially, a 'fudge factor' to allow some boats designed and built prior to the adoption of the Universal Rule to compete.

The numerator contains a yacht's speed-giving elements, length and sail area, while the retarding quantity of displacement is in the denominator. Also the result will be dimensionally correct; R will be a linear unit of length (such as feet or meters). J Class boats will have a rating from 65 to 76 feet (20 to 23 m). This is not the overall length of the boat but a limiting factor for the variables in the equation. Designers are free to change any of the variables such as length or displacement but must reduce the other variables to compensate.

=== J Class examples ===
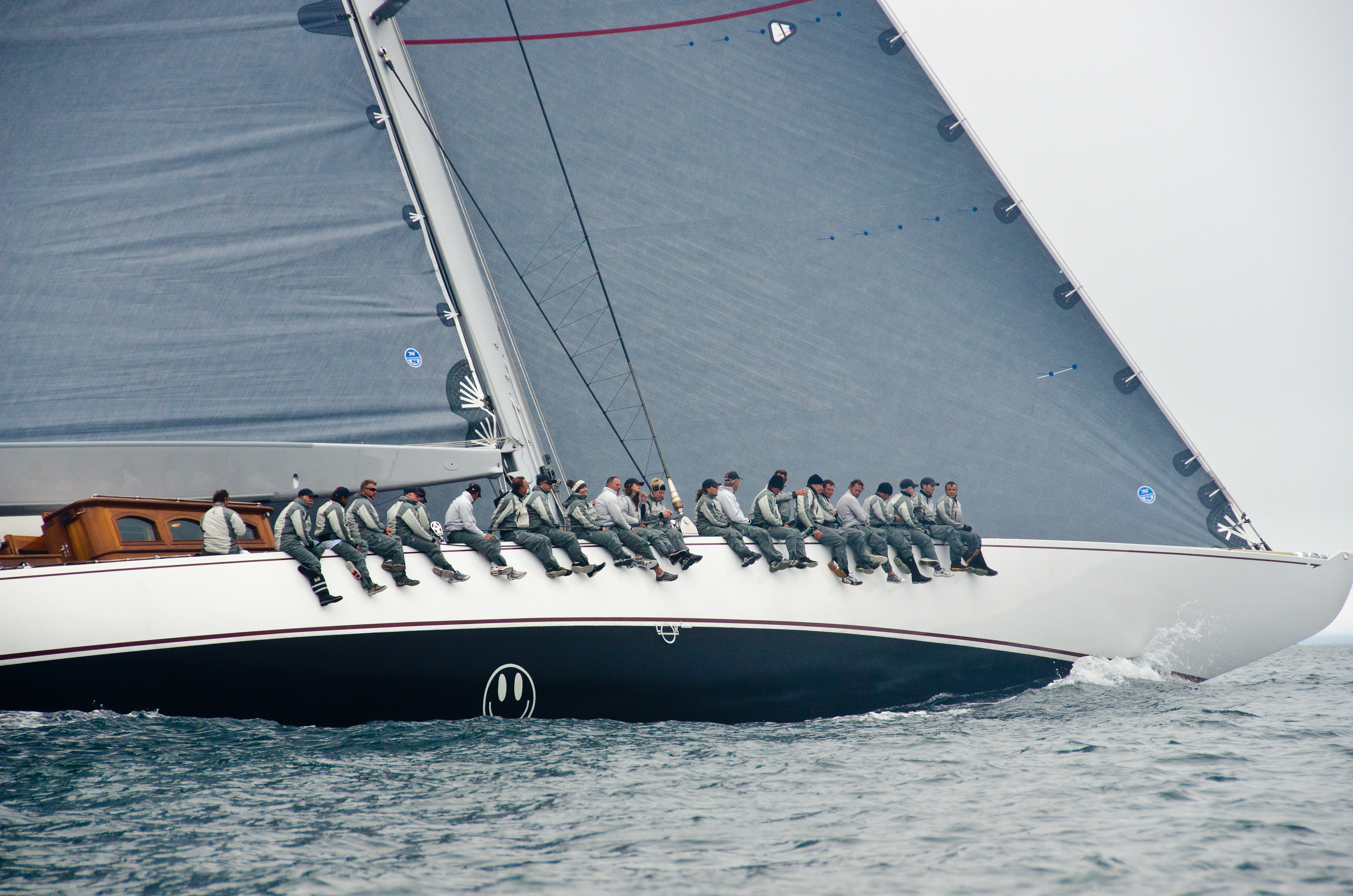
Crew lining the gunwale of J Class yacht Ranger

Video of a J Class race

A table of J Class yachts demonstrating that application of the Universal Rule could result in a rating $R$ from 65 to 76 feet (20 to 23 m). Length overall (LOA) of the yachts ranged from 119 to 139 feet (36 to 42 m). Sail areas of the yachts ranged from 7,288 to 7,651 square feet (677.1 to 710.8 m^{2}).

Colors: Red: America's Cup challengers; Blue: defenders; Green: non-competitors

Launch	Name	Builder	LOA	LWL	Beam	Draught	Displacement	Sail area
1930	Shamrock V	(England) Camper and Nicholsons	119 ft 1 in	81 ft 1 in	20 ft	14 ft 9 in	134 tons	7,540 sq ft
1930	Weetamoe	(United States) Herreshoff Manufacturing Company	125 ft 9 in	83 ft	20 ft	14 ft 6 in		7,550 sq ft
1930	Yankee	(United States) George Lawley & Son	126 ft	83 ft	22 ft 6 in	14 ft 6 in	148 tons	7,288 sq ft
1930	Whirlwind	(United States) George Lawley & Son	139 ft	86 ft	21 ft 9 in	15 ft 6 in	158 tons	7,335 sq ft
1930	Enterprise	(United States) Herreshoff Manufacturing Company	120 ft 9 in	80 ft	23 ft	14 ft 6 in	128 tons	7,583 sq ft
1933	Velsheda	(England) Camper and Nicholsons	127 ft 6 in	83 ft	21 ft 6 in	15 ft		
1934	Endeavour	(England) Camper and Nicholsons	129 ft 6 in	83 ft 6 in	22 ft	14 ft 9 in	143 tons	7,651 sq ft
1934	Rainbow	(United States) Herreshoff Manufacturing Company	127 ft 6 in	82 ft	21 ft	15 ft	141 tons	7,535 sq ft
1936	Endeavour II	(England) Camper and Nicholsons	135 ft 6 in	87 ft	21 ft 6 in	15 ft	162 tons	7,543 sq ft
1937	Ranger	(United States) Bath Iron Works	135 ft	87 ft	21 ft	15 ft	166 tons	7,546 sq ft

== History and evolution of the J Class ==
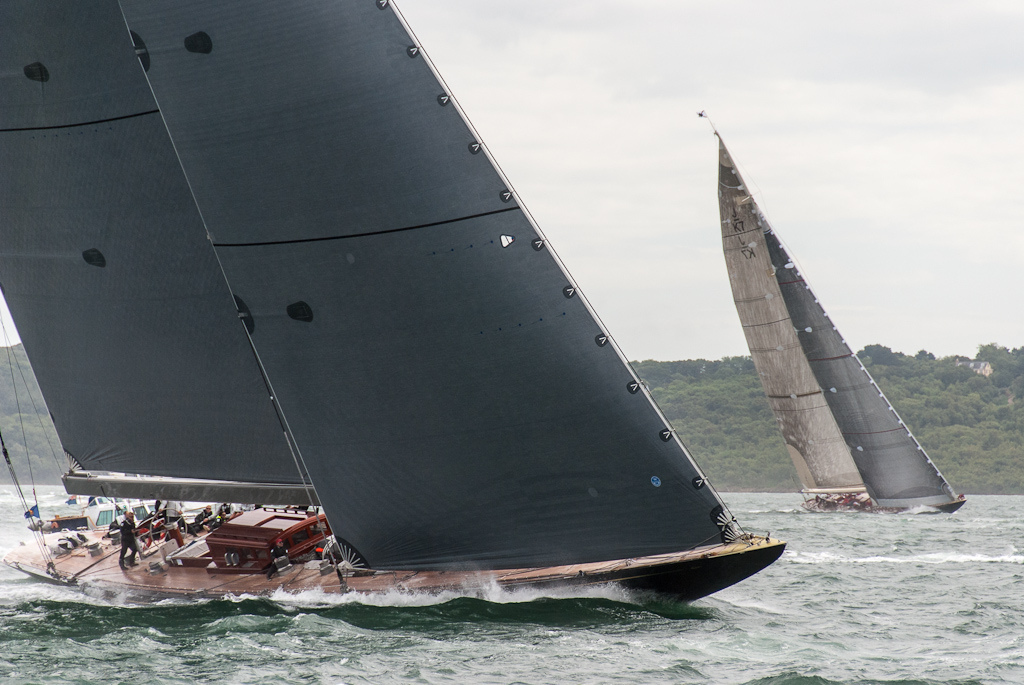
Rainbow and Velsheda racing at the J Class Solent regatta, 2012

Prior to the adoption of the Universal Rule, the Seawanhaka Rule was used to govern the design of boats for inter club racing. As the Seawanhaka Rule used only two variables: Load Waterline Length ($L.W.L$) and Sail Area, racing boats at the time were becoming more and more extreme. Larger and larger sails atop shorter and wider boats leading either to unwieldy, and ultimately unsafe, boats or craft that simply were not competitive. In order to account, in some ways, for the beam and the relationship of the length overall ($L.O.A$) to the load waterline length the universal rule was proposed, taking into account displacement and length, which itself was a result of a formula taking into account such things as "quarter beam length". As different boats were designed and built, the notion of classes was derived to maintain groupings of competitive class.

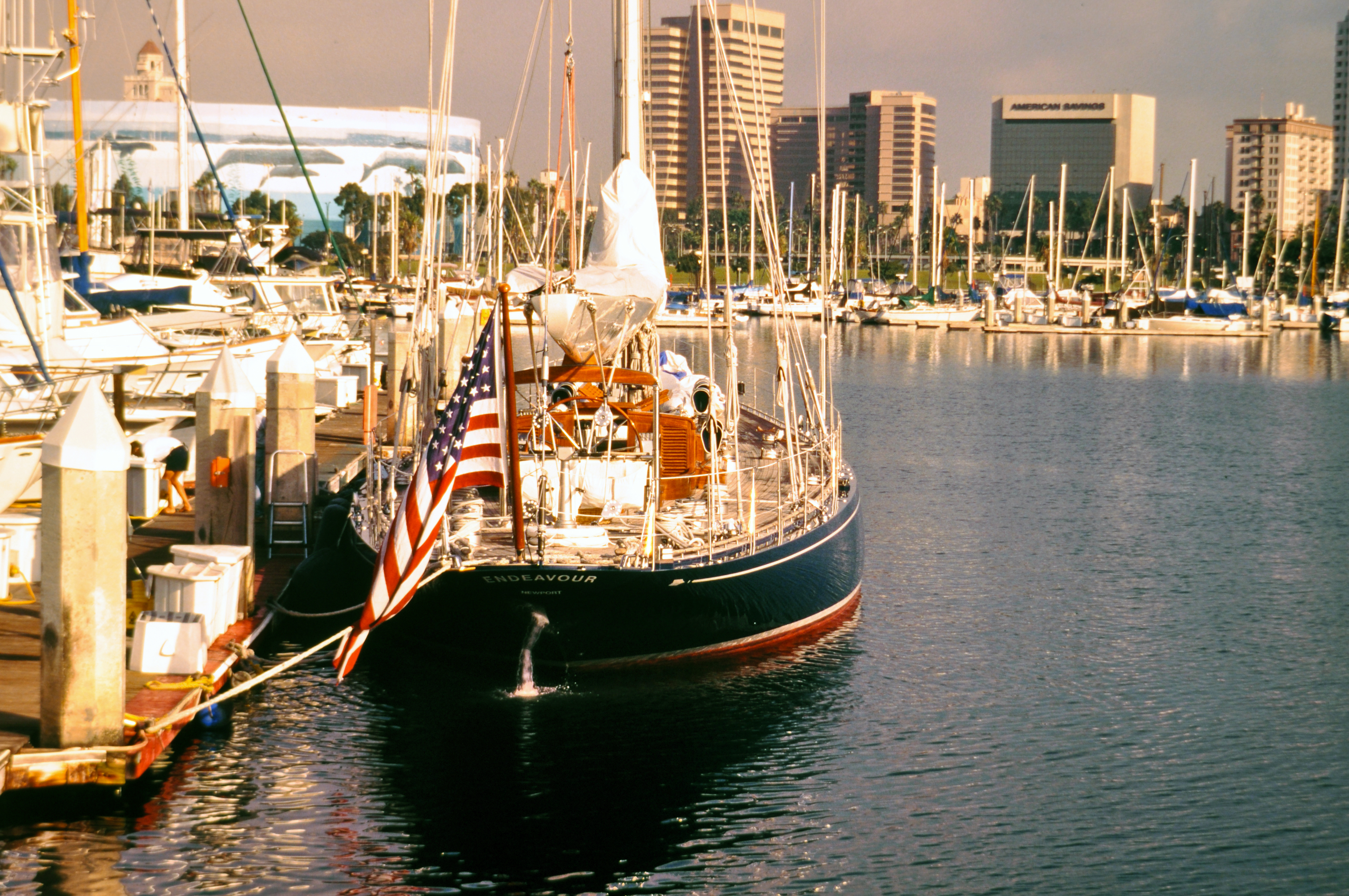
The J Class Endeavour of 1934, shown here in 1996

Following Sir Thomas Lipton's near success in the 1920 America's Cup, he challenged again for the last time at age 79, in 1929. The challenge drew all the novelties developed in the previous decade on small boats to be ported onto large boats, and pitted British and American yacht design in a technological race. Between 1930 and 1937, the improvements brought to the design of sailboats were numerous and significant:

- The high-aspect bermuda rig replaces the gaff rig on large sailboats
- Solid-rod lenticular rigging for shrouds and stays
- Luff and foot grooved spars with rail and slides replacing wooden hoops
- Multiplication of spreader sets: one set previously (1914), two sets (1930), three sets (1934), four sets (1937)
- Multiplication of the number of winches: 23 winches, Enterprise (1930)
- Electrical navigational instruments borrowed from aeronautics with repeaters for windvane and anemometer, Whirlwind (1930)
- "Park Avenue" boom (Enterprise, 1930) and "North Circular" boom (Rainbow, 1934) developed to trim mainsail foot
- Riveted aluminium mast (4,000 lb (1,800 kg), Duralumin), Enterprise (1930)
- Genoa Jib (Rainbow, 1934) and quadrangular jib (Endeavour, 1934)
- Development of nylon parachute (symmetric) spinnakers, including the World's largest at 18,000 sq ft (1,700 m^{2}) on Endeavour II (1936)
- Duralumin wing-mast, Ranger (1937)

All these improvements may not have been possible without the context of the America's Cup and the stability offered by the Universal Rule. The competition was biased because the British challengers had to be constructed in the country of the Challenging Yacht Club, which is still in use today, and had to sail their own hull to the venue, which is now no longer required.

Yacht designer Clinton Hoadley Crane noted in his memoirs that "America's Cup racing has never led to good sportsmanship. The attitude of the New York Yacht Club [...] has been more that of a man in the forward position at war who has been ordered to hold his position at all costs – at all costs." In 1930, Thomas Lipton spent $1,000,000 for his Shamrock V challenge when America was facing a stock market crash, but the NYYC still built four cup defenders. The rivalry led both countries to put on a display of true technological innovations using the maximum load waterline length authorized by the rule for Endeavour II and Ranger in 1937.

Most J Class yachts were scrapped prior to or during World War II because steel and lead had become precious to the war effort, others languished as hulks. In the post-war era, J Class racing was deemed far too expensive, so no challenge for the America's Cup was placed until 1958 with the smaller third International Rule 12 Metre class.

=== Rigging problems ===
The original yachts carried 165 ft (50 m) masts, but they dismasted frequently. As a consequence, British yachtsman Sir Richard Fairey (Chairman of Fairey Aviation, and owner of Shamrock V) suggested an America's Cup challenge in the smaller K-Class. The New York Yacht Club refused the drop in size.

The J Class rule was amended in 1937 to force rigs to weigh a minimum of 6,400 lb. The larger scantling would prevent the frequent dismastings that had been previously observed in the British Big Class season of 1935.

=== Revival ===
By the 1980s only three J Class yachts were still in existence: Shamrock V, Endeavour and Velsheda, all designed by Charles Ernest Nicholson. Velsheda never served for an America's Cup challenge.

A revival of the J Class was triggered by Elizabeth Meyer, who oversaw the refits of Endeavour and Shamrock V. For several decades Velsheda lay derelict in the mud of the Hamble river – she was refitted in 1984, too, and then more completely in 1997.

In August 2001, as part of the celebration of the 150th Jubilee of America's Cup celebration, the three existing J Class racers were brought to the Isle of Wight for a round the island race.

The creation of the J Class Association in 2000 and the launch of a new replica of Ranger in 2004 accelerated the revival of the class. Several replicas and original designs were subsequently built and the association now organizes races for the J Class in Newport, Falmouth and Cowes.

By 2017 the J Class fleet comprises nine boats: Endeavour, Hanuman, Lionheart, Rainbow, Ranger, Shamrock V, Velsheda, Topaz, and, launched in January 2017, Svea.

On March 12, 2020, Svea and Topaz collided while maneuvering at the start line of the Superyacht Challenge Antigua. Both boats retired from racing with damage; two sailors were injured.

== List of J Class yachts ==
Ten yachts were built to the J Class rule between 1930 and 1937, six in America and four in Great Britain.

Other boats raced in J Class regattas: the yachts Katoura (Starling Burgess, 1927), Resolute (Nathanael Herreshoff, 1914) and Vanitie (William Gardner, 1914) served as trial horses and most International Rule 23mR yachts were converted to the J Class, of which three remain in existence: Astra, Cambria and Candida.

J Class conversions did not compete or qualify Challengers Defenders replicas
Launch	Name	Sail			Designer	First ship-owner and Yacht Club	Description
1893	Britannia	1	K1		(Scotland) George Lennox Watson	Prince Albert Edward, RYS	YRA first class rater converted to the J Class (1931). scuttled (1936)
1907	White Heather II	B1	7	K7	(Scotland) William Fife III	Myles Burton Kennedy, Royal Albert YC	23mR converted to the J Class (1930). scrapped to cast the lead for Velsheda (1932)
1914	Resolute	J1			(United States) Nathanael Greene Herreshoff	Henry Walters syndicate, NYYC	Universal rule 75-footer defender (AC1920). converted to the J Class (1931). scrapped (1939)
1914	Vanitie	I1			(United States) William Gardner	Alexander Smith Cochran, NYYC	Universal rule 75-footer defender trials (AC1920). converted to the I Class (1931). scrapped (1939)
1928	Astra	K2	JK2		(England) Charles Ernest Nicholson	Sir Adam Mortimer Singer, RYS	23mR converted to the J Class (1931). refitted (1987)
1928	Cambria	K4			(Scotland) William Fife III	Sir William Berry, RYS	23mR refitted (1995, 2001).re-rated as a J Class (2003)
1929	Candida	K8			(England) Charles Ernest Nicholson	Hermann Anton Andreae, RSYC	23mR converted to the J Class (1931). refitted (1989)
1930	Shamrock V	JK3			(England) Charles Ernest Nicholson	Sir Thomas Lipton, RUYC	Unsuccessful challenger (AC1930). restored by Pendennis shipyard (2001).
1930	Weetamoe	1			(United States) Clinton Hoadley Crane	George Nichols syndicate, NYYC	defender trials (AC1930, AC1934). scrapped (1938)
1930	Yankee	2	JUS2		(United States) Frank Cabot Paine	John Silsbee Lawrence syndicate, NYYC	defender trials (AC1930, AC1934, AC1937). scrapped (1941)
1930	Whirlwind	3			(United States) Lewis Francis Herreshoff	Landon Ketchum Thorne syndicate, NYYC	defender trials (AC1930). scrapped (1935)
1930	Enterprise	4			(United States) Starling Burgess	Harold Vanderbilt syndicate, NYYC	successful defender 4:0 (AC1930). scrapped (1935)
1933	Velsheda	JK7			(England) Charles Ernest Nicholson	William Lawrence Stephenson, RYS	restored by Southampton Yacht Services (1997)
1934	Endeavour	JK4			(England) Charles Ernest Nicholson	Sir Thomas Sopwith, RYS	unsuccessful challenger 2:4 (AC1934). restored by Royal Huisman (1989)
1934	Rainbow	J5	J4		(United States) Starling Burgess	Harold Vanderbilt syndicate, NYYC	successful defender 4:2 (AC1934). defender trials (AC1937). scrapped (1940)
1936	Endeavour II	JK6			(England) Charles Ernest Nicholson	Sir Thomas Sopwith, RYS	unsuccessful challenger 0:4 (AC1937). scrapped (1968)
1937	"77C"-Ranger	J5			(United States) Starling Burgess & Olin Stephens	Harold Vanderbilt, NYYC	successful defender 4:0 (AC1937). scrapped (1941)
2004	"77C"-Ranger	J5			(United States) Starling Burgess & Olin Stephens	John A. Williams, NYYC	replica of "77C"-Ranger (1937) built by Royal Denship
2009	Hanuman	JK6			(England) Charles Ernest Nicholson	James H. Clark, NYYC	replica of Endeavour II (1936) built by Royal Huisman
2010	"77F"-Lionheart	JH1			(United States) Starling Burgess & Olin Stephens	Harold Goddijn	original design (model "77F", 1937) built by Claasen Jachtbouw
2012	Rainbow	JH2			(United States) Starling Burgess	Chris Gongriep, ZZV	replica of Rainbow (1934) built by Holland Jachtbouw
2015	Topaz	J8			(United States) Frank Cabot Paine		original design (proposal "A", 1935) built by Holland Jachtbouw
2017	Svea	JS1			(Sweden) Tore Holm	Thomas Siebel, StFYC	original design (1937) built by Vitters Shipyard
