= Floyd L. Carlisle =

American businessman (1881–1942)

Floyd Leslie Carlisle
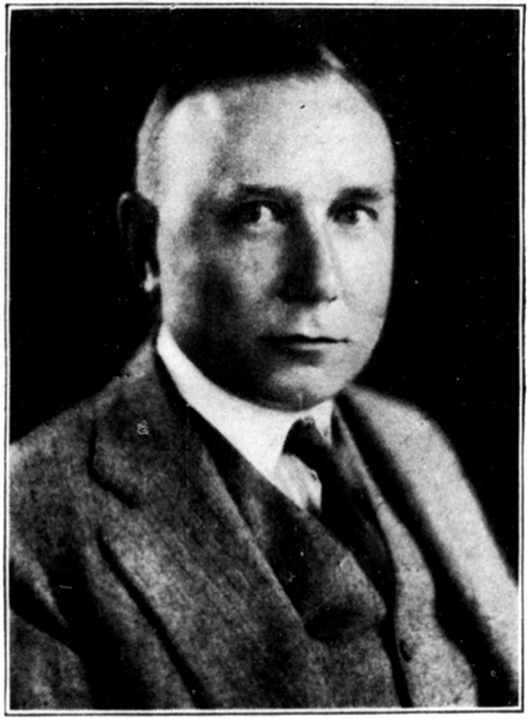
- Carlisle in 1930
- Born: March 5, 1881; Watertown, New York, US
- Died: November 9, 1942 (aged 61); Glen Cove, New York, US
- Resting place: Watertown, New York, US
- Education: Columbia University
- Occupation: Businessman
- Known for: Heading several major utility companies
- Spouse: Edna Rogers (m. 1912)
- Children: 4

Floyd Leslie Carlisle (March 5, 1881 – November 9, 1942) was an American businessman who owned several companies, including the St. Regis Paper Company, which at one time was the third largest paper company in the United States. He was described as the "No. 1 U. S. utility magnate" by TIME in 1939.

== Early life and education ==
Carlisle was born in Watertown, New York, United States, on March 5, 1881, to William S. Carlisle, an inventor, and Catherine Rose Burdick. He attended Cornell University, graduating in 1903. He studied law and was admitted to the bar, working for his brother's office in Watertown, New York, for several years before becoming a businessman. In 1910, he was involved his first business venture, organizing Northern New York Trust Co. from a consolidation of two up-state banks. In 1912, he married Edna Rogers, daughter of Watson Merrick Rogers, a justice of the New York State Supreme Court. They had four children.

== Career ==
In 1916, Carlisle headed the group which acquired the St. Regis Paper Company, becoming its president in the process. Under his administration, the company expanded significantly, becoming at one point, the third largest paper company in the United States. In 1920, Carlisle was responsible for acquiring Northern New York Utilities, which in 1926 was absorbed into the Northeastern Power Corporation, which Carlisle headed. Through a series of mergers, it became part of the Niagara Hudson Power Corporation in 1929, where he served as the executive chairman.

In May 1930, following the death of Nicholas Frederic Brady, Carlisle was elected to the directorate of the Consolidated Gas Company. In March 1931, United Corporation, a major utility holding company which Carlisle's businesses had a large stake in, expanded its holdings using a stock swap to become the largest shareholder in both Niagara Hudson and United. During the investigation that lead the Securities Act of 1933, inquisitor Ferdinand Pecora stated that at its peak, United controlled a quarter of all American utilities. The Securities and Exchange Commission, starting in 1935, began investigating United and stated that it should divest its investments per the Public Utility Holding Company Act of 1935; the Supreme Court of the United States sided with the SEC in 1938, but allowed him to remain on the board.

== Death ==
Carlisle died on November 9, 1942 at the North Country Community Hospital in Glen Cove, New York from a short illness. A funeral service was held three days later at Lattingtown, New York, with Frank Du Moulin being among the three rectors present. Many prominent businessmen from the Eastern United States were present, with Neal Dow Becker, Colonel William Kelly Harrison Jr., Paul A. Schoellkopf, Gordon S. Rentschler, and Joseph P. Day, and Roy K. Ferguson among those present. He was buried at his family's plot in Watertown on November 13.
