= Thomas Lipton =

Scottish businessman (1848–1931)

Sir Thomas Lipton Bt KCVO
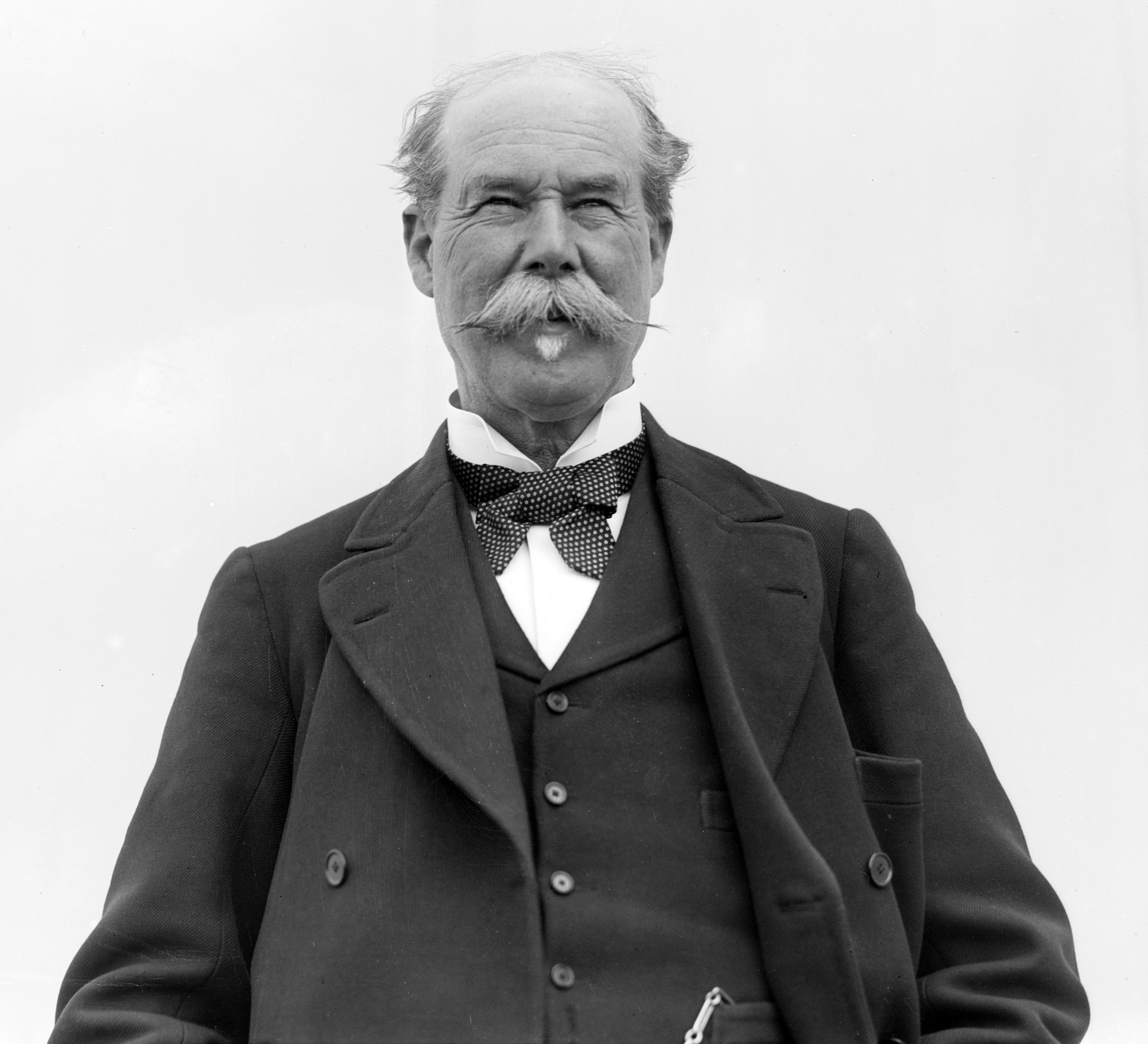
- Lipton in 1909
- Born: Thomas Johnstone Lipton; 10 May 1848; Gorbals, Glasgow, Scotland
- Died: 2 October 1931 (aged 83); Osidge, East Barnet, England
- Occupations: Merchant, company founder, yachtsman
- Known for: Founder of Lipton

Sir Thomas Johnstone Lipton, 1st Baronet (10 May 1848 – 2 October 1931) was a Scottish businessman and company founder of Lipton Tea, merchant, philanthropist and yachtsman who lost 5 America's Cup races.

Lipton used extensive advertising to promote his chain of grocery stores and the Lipton tea brand. He was also a yachtsman, challenging for the America's Cup yacht race five times between 1899 and 1930.

== Parentage and childhood ==
Lipton was born in a tenement in Crown Street in the Gorbals, Glasgow, on 10 May 1848. His Ulster-Scots parents, Thomas Lipton senior and Frances Lipton (née Johnstone), were from the townland of either Shannock Green or Shankillk (Tonitybog), both near Roslea, in the south-east corner of County Fermanagh in Ulster, not far from Clones in County Monaghan. His parents were married in St. Mark's Church of Ireland Church in Aghadrumsee, near Roslea.

The Liptons had been smallholders in County Fermanagh for generations but, by the late 1840s, Thomas Lipton's parents had been forced to leave Ireland due to the Great Famine of 1845. Moving to Scotland in search of a better living for their young family, the Liptons had settled in Glasgow by 1847. Lipton's father had a number of occupations throughout the 1840s and 1850s, including working as a labourer and as a printer.

Although Lipton later stated that he was born at his family's home in Crown Street in the Gorbals in 1850, there is no record of this in the parish register for that period. In the 1851 census, however, the family were recorded as living in the north of Glasgow, with young Thomas being listed as being 3 years old, suggesting that he must have been born in 1848. Thomas' siblings, three brothers and one sister, all died in infancy, but Thomas, the youngest, survived.

"Tommy" Lipton was educated at St Andrew's Parish School close to Glasgow Green between 1853 and 1863. By the early 1860s his parents owned a shop at 11 Crown Street in the Gorbals where they sold ham, butter and eggs. Thomas Lipton left school at the age of thirteen to supplement his parents' limited income, and found employment as a printer's errand boy, and later as a shirtcutter. He also enrolled at a night school, the Gorbals Youth's School, during this period.

== Grocer and Lipton's tea ==
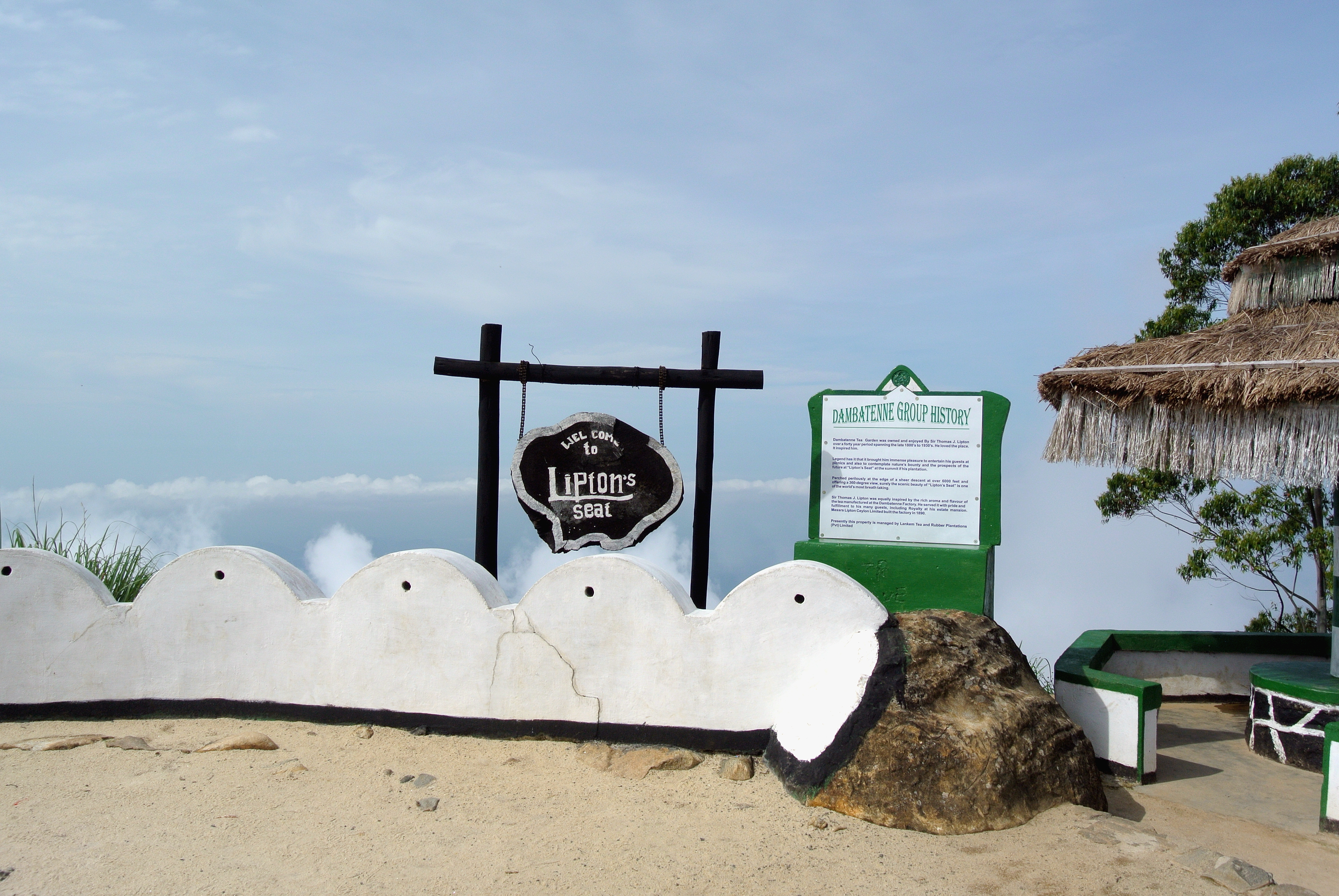
Lipton's Seat in Sri Lanka

In 1864 Lipton signed up as a cabin boy on a steamer running between Glasgow and Belfast and was captivated by life aboard the ship and the stories told by sailors who had travelled to the United States. After being let go by the steamer company, Lipton quickly used the wages he had saved to purchase passage on a ship bound for the U.S., where he spent five years working and travelling all over the country. Lipton had a number of jobs during this time: at a tobacco plantation in Virginia, as an accountant and book-keeper at a rice plantation in South Carolina, as a door-to-door salesman in New Orleans, a farmhand in New Jersey, and finally as a grocery assistant in New York.

He returned to Glasgow in 1870, initially helping his parents run their small shop in the Gorbals. The following year he opened his first provision shop—Lipton's Market—at 101 Stobcross Street in the Anderston area of Glasgow. This enterprise proved to be successful and Lipton soon established a chain of groceries, first across Glasgow, the rest of Scotland, until finally he had stores throughout Britain. While Lipton was expanding his empire, tea prices were falling and demand was growing among his middle-class customers.

In 1880, Lipton invested in the Union Stockyards of Omaha, Nebraska, founding a large packing plant in South Omaha which he sold to American interests in 1887. In 1888, when his empire had grown to 300 stores, he entered the tea trade and opened his tea-tasting office. He started bypassing traditional trading and wholesale distribution channels (most UK tea-trading was focused in London's Mincing Lane) in order to sell teas at unprecedentedly low prices to the untapped poor working class market. In order to provide his shops with goods Lipton bought tea gardens and in doing so, he established the Lipton tea brand, which continues to exist today.

Lipton visited British Ceylon in 1890 and made business deals with James Taylor, who introduced tea gardens to the country with indentured Tamil workers from British India. Lipton's company purchased Ceylon tea, distributing it through Europe and the USA beginning in 1890. At Queen Victoria's diamond jubilee in 1897 he gave £20,000 for providing dinners for a large number of the London poor.

== Sportsman ==
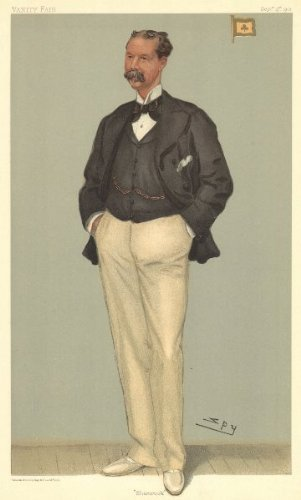
Depiction of Lipton by Spy, 1901

King Edward VII and King George V both shared their interest in yachting with Lipton and enjoyed his company. Between 1899 and 1930 he challenged the American holders of the America's Cup through the Royal Ulster Yacht Club five times with his yachts called Shamrock through Shamrock V. His well-publicised efforts to win the cup, which earned him a specially designed cup for "the best of all losers", made his tea famous in the United States. Lipton, a self-made man, was no natural member of the British upper class and the elite Royal Yacht Squadron only admitted him shortly before his death. Lipton was inducted into the America's Cup Hall of Fame in 1993.

Before the first Football World Cup was held in 1930, Thomas Lipton donated the Sir Thomas Lipton Trophy and The Lipton Challenge Cup in Italy.

In 1914 he presented the silver Sir Thomas Lipton Cup to his friend Con Riley of Winnipeg as a means of promoting the sport of rowing in the central portions of Canada and the United States. Since then the rowing clubs of the North West International Rowing Association (NWIRA) have fiercely battled each year for the honour of having their names engraved upon the Lipton Cup.

He also donated the Copa Lipton trophy which was contested between the national football teams of Argentina and Uruguay from 1905 to 1992.

== Personal life ==
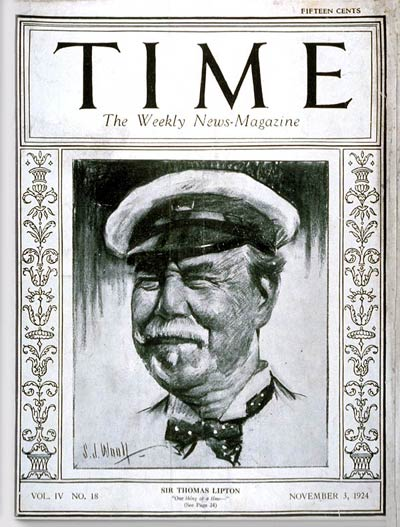
Time cover, 3 Nov 1924

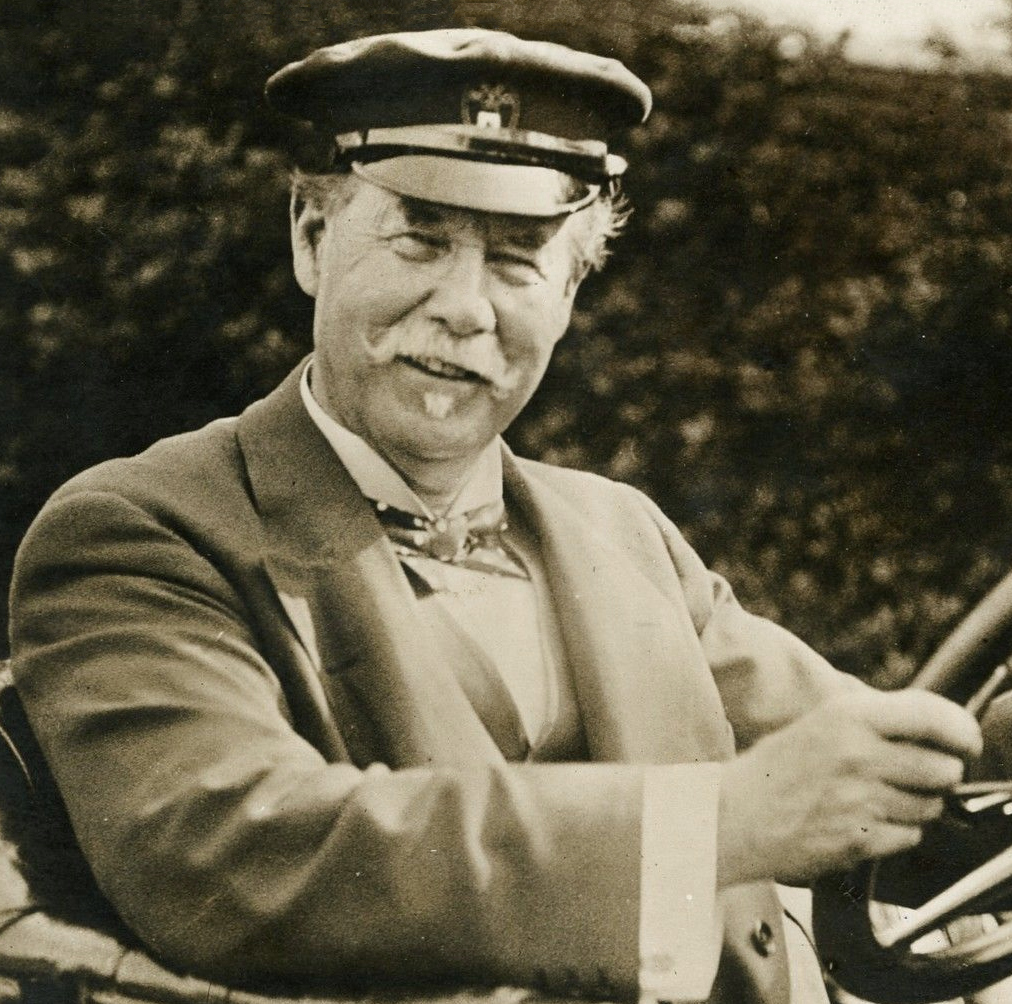
Photo of Lipton taken shortly before his death in 1931

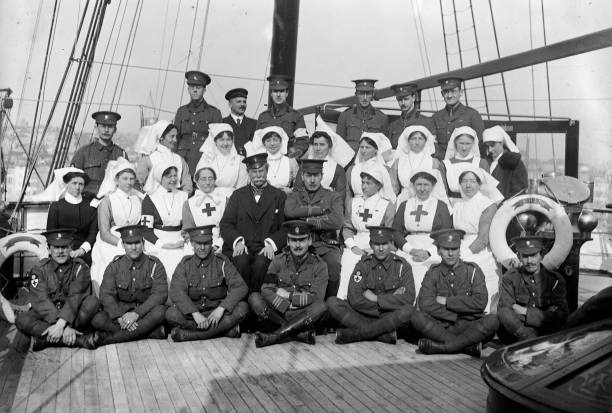
Thomas Lipton on his yacht Eric in 1915 while undertaking a relief mission in Serbia

Lipton was sometimes described in the press as 'the world's most eligible bachelor', and carefully cultivated a public image as a 'ladies man'. He never had a relationship with a woman, using as the excuse that none measured up to his mother. Instead, he maintained a thirty-year relationship with one of his early shop assistants, William Love, with whom he lived. When they parted other male companions followed, including an orphan from Crete whom Lipton met during a cruise in 1900. A close friend was Maurice Talvande, the self-styled Comte de Mauny.

Lipton came to his home, Osidge, in Southgate, London, from Muswell Hill in 1892. Before moving in, he redecorated the house completely, built a new billiards room and moved the existing pathway as far away from the house as possible. Before the coming of the motor car, his home's newly enlarged stables contained at least three pairs of fast carriage horses, of which he was proud. He was driven to his offices in City Road each day, and did not use the nearby railway.

During the First World War, Lipton helped organisations of medical volunteers. He placed his yachts at the disposal of the Red Cross, the Scottish Women's Hospitals Committee of Dr. Elsie Inglis, the Serbian Relief Fund and others, for the transport of medical volunteers (doctors and nurses) and medical supplies. In Serbia during the winter of 1914–1915 and the spring of 1915, several British hospital teams were working with Serbian military and civilian doctors and nurses. A catastrophic typhus epidemic erupted, killing thousands of civilians, soldiers, and prisoners of war; medical staff were among the first victims. At the height of the epidemic, Lipton decided to visit Serbia, travelling aboard his steam yacht Erin via Sardinia, Malta, Athens and Thessaloníki.

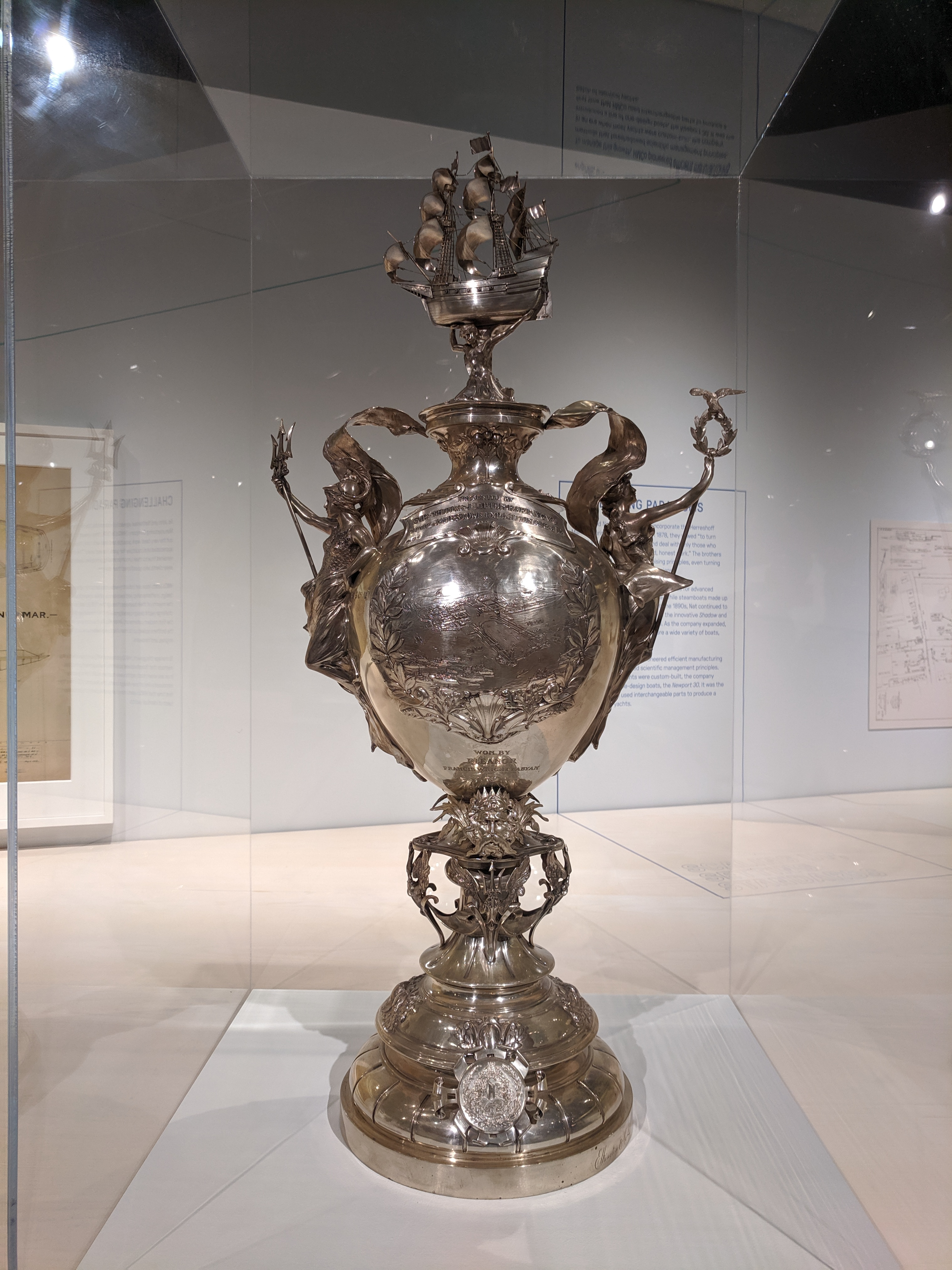
Trophy Lipton awarded at the Jamestown Exposition regatta in 1907

Once in Serbia, he visited hospitals and medical missions in Belgrade, Kragujevac, Niš, Vrnjačka Banja, and elsewhere. His modesty made him very popular among the people. He asked only for modest lodgings and requested for meals only what the common people ate under war conditions. He also liked to pose for photographs with Serbian officers and soldiers. In addition to visiting many hospitals, where he encouraged doctors, nurses and soldiers, he found time to attend traditional fairs and to take a part in blackberry gathering and fishing. He was made an honorary citizen of the city of Niš.

Author Herbert W. Newby writes in a book about Southgate in 1949:

Sir Thomas was proud of his successes in life, and any reference to him made in any publication was always carefully cut out and pasted into a book kept for this purpose. These books formed a most interesting section of his library. He was a very genial man to meet and always put a stranger quickly at ease. I met him on several occasions and found him without any form of snobbery.

Lipton was appointed Knight Commander of the Royal Victorian Order by Edward VII on 8 March 1901. On 24 July 1902 he was created Baronet of Osidge, in the Parish of Southgate, in the County of Middlesex.

A portrait of Lipton appeared on the cover of Time magazine on 3 November 1924.

== Freemasonry ==
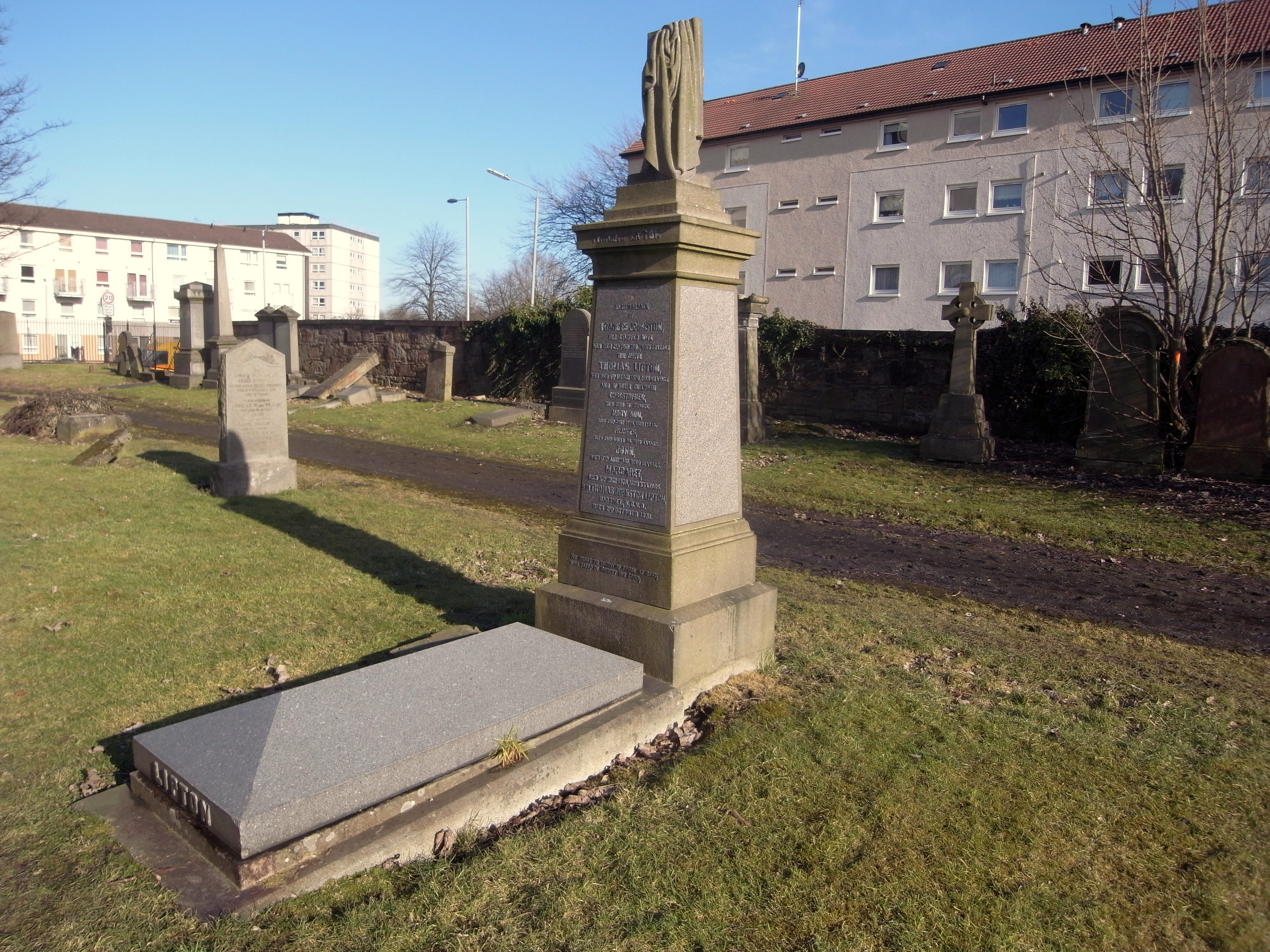
Lipton's grave at Glasgow, Southern Necropolis

Lipton was Initiated into Scottish Freemasonry in Lodge Scotia, No. 178, (Glasgow).

== Death ==
He died at Osidge on 2 October 1931 and bequeathed the majority of his fortune to his native city of Glasgow, including his yachting trophies, which are now on display at the Kelvingrove Art Gallery and Museum. Sir Thomas Lipton was buried alongside his parents and siblings in Glasgow's Southern Necropolis. He left no issue and so his title was not carried forward and died with him.

== In literature and popular culture ==
The departure of Lipton's Shamrock III and America's Cup fleet from Gourock in 1903 was satirised by Neil Munro in his Erchie Macpherson story, "Erchie Suffers a Sea Change", published in the Glasgow Evening News on 1 June 1903.

== See also ==
- Copa Lipton
- Sir Thomas Lipton Trophy
- James Taylor (Ceylon)
- Ceylon tea

Awards and achievements
| Preceded by Sigmund Freud | Cover of Time Magazine; 3 November 1924 | Succeeded by Ethel Barrymore |
Baronetage of the United Kingdom
| New creation | Baronet (of Osidge); 1902–1931 | Extinct |
| Preceded by Lewis baronets | Lipton baronets of Osidge; 24 July 1902 | Succeeded by McLaren baronets |
