= 1914 in sports =

1914 in sports describes the year's events in world sport.

== American football ==
College championship

- College football national championship – Army Cadets

Professional championships

- Ohio League champions – Akron Parratt's Indians

Events

- 15 November — Harry Turner, of the Canton Professionals, becomes the first player to die from game-related injuries in the "Ohio League", the direct predecessor to the National Football League.

== Association football ==
Brazil

- Formation of the Brazilian Football Confederation (Confederação Brasileira de Futebol or CBF)
- Sociedade Esportiva Palmeiras officially founded in São Paulo on August 26.

England

- The Football League – Blackburn Rovers 51 points, Aston Villa 44, Middlesbrough 43, Oldham Athletic 43, West Bromwich Albion 43, Bolton Wanderers 42
- FA Cup final – Burnley 1–0 Liverpool at Crystal Palace, London

Germany

- National Championship – SpVgg Fürth (2–2) 3–2 VfB Leipzig at Magdeburg

Portugal

- Formation in Lisbon of the Portuguese Football Federation (Federação Portuguesa de Futebol or FPF)

Scotland

- Scottish Football League – Celtic
- Scottish Cup final – Celtic 4–1 Hibernian at Ibrox Park (replay following 0–0 draw)

== Australian rules football ==
VFL Premiership

- 26 September – Carlton wins the 18th VFL Premiership, defeating South Melbourne 6.9 (45) to 4.15 (39) in the 1914 VFL Grand Final

South Australian Football League

- 19 September – Port Adelaide 13.15 (93) defeats North Adelaide 1.8 (14) for their second successive SAFL flag and eighth overall
- Magarey Medal won by Jack Ashley (Port Adelaide)

West Australian Football League

- 10 October – East Fremantle 5.13 (43) defeats South Fremantle 3.6 (24) for its ninth WAFL premiership.

Events

- University withdraws from the VFL at the end of the season
- Port Adelaide become the only SAFA/SAFL/SANFL team to finish with a perfect season, overall winning thirty consecutive matches including one against a combined team from the other six SAFL clubs and one against Carlton.

== Bandy ==
Sweden

- Championship final – AIK 4–2 Djurgårdens IF

== Baseball ==
World Series

- 9–13 October — Boston Braves (NL) defeats Philadelphia Athletics (AL) to win the 1914 World Series by 4 games to 0

Events

- The "Federal League War" ensues when the Federal League leaves Minor League Baseball and competes with the two established major leagues. Retaining clubs in Kansas City, Indianapolis, St Louis, Chicago and Pittsburgh, the Federal League sets up additional clubs in Buffalo, Baltimore and Brooklyn.
- Baltimore Terrapins are a great popular success and drive the minor Orioles out of business, so creating the basis of the baseball anti–trust case
- 22 April — Babe Ruth pitches his first professional game for the Baltimore Orioles at age 19

== Boxing ==
Events

- Jack Johnson spends the year moving from one country to another but stages exhibition fights as far afield as Gothenburg and Buenos Aires. In June, he defends his world heavyweight title against Frank Moran in Paris and wins over 20 rounds.
- 1 to 24 January — Danish boxer Waldemar Holberg defeats Ray Bronson over 20 rounds in Melbourne and claims the vacant World Welterweight Championship. Just 23 days later, Holberg loses the title to Tom McCormick after a sixth round foul, also at Melbourne.
- 21 March — McCormick loses the welterweight title to Matt Wells over 20 rounds at Sydney.
- 30 March — a World Flyweight Championship (108 lb to 112 lb) is proposed for the first time after Jimmy Wilde defeats Eugene Husson in London. Wilde, subsequently ranked by most experts as the greatest-ever flyweight, holds the title until 1923.
- 7 April — Al McCoy defeats George Chip with a surprise first-round knockout in Brooklyn, New York, to take the World Middleweight Championship. McCoy holds the title until 1917.
- With a series of wins from April to November, Jack Dillon resolves the long-standing issue of the vacant World Light Heavyweight Championship in his favour. He defeats Battling Levinsky, Bob Moha, Frank Mantell and Charley Weinert to claim the title, which he holds until 1916.
- 3 June — Kid Williams defeats Johnny Coulon by a third-round knockout at Vernon, California, to win the World Bantamweight Championship. Williams holds the title until 1917.
- 7 July — Freddie Welsh defeats Willie Ritchie over 20 rounds in London to win the World Lightweight Championship. Welsh holds the title until 1917.

Lineal world champions

- World Heavyweight Championship – Jack Johnson
- World Light Heavyweight Championship – vacant → Jack Dillon
- World Middleweight Championship – George Chip → Al McCoy
- World Welterweight Championship – vacant → Waldemar Holberg → Tom McCormick → Matt Wells
- World Lightweight Championship – Willie Ritchie → Freddie Welsh
- World Featherweight Championship – Johnny Kilbane
- World Bantamweight Championship – Johnny Coulon → Kid Williams
- World Flyweight Championship – Jimmy Wilde

== Canadian football ==
- The Hamilton Alerts operate independently of a union for several years
- Interprovincial Rugby Football Union - Toronto Argonauts
- Ontario Rugby Football Union - Hamilton Rowing Club
- Western Canada Rugby Football Union - Regina
- Intercollegiate Rugby Football Union - University of Toronto
- 6th Grey Cup – Toronto Argonauts defeat University of Toronto 14-2

== Cricket ==
Events

- The 1914 English cricket season is cancelled at the end of August because of the outbreak of the First World War. The last four matches to be played all finish on 2 September and the remaining five scheduled fixtures are cancelled.

England

- County Championship – Surrey
- Minor Counties Championship – undecided
- Most runs – Jack Hobbs 2697 @ 58.63 (HS 226)
- Most wickets – Colin Blythe 170 @ 15.19 (BB 9–97)
- Wisden Cricketers of the Year – Johnny Douglas, Percy Fender, Wally Hardinge, Donald Knight, Sydney Smith

Australia

- Sheffield Shield – New South Wales
- Most runs – Charlie Macartney 892 @ 111.50 (HS 201)
- Most wickets – Charles Kelleway 45 @ 12.68 (BB 7–35)

India

- Bombay Quadrangular – Hindus shared with Muslims

New Zealand

- Plunket Shield – Canterbury

South Africa

- Currie Cup – Western Province

West Indies

- Inter-Colonial Tournament – not contested

== Cycling ==
Tour de France

- Philippe Thys (Belgium) wins the 12th Tour de France

== Figure skating ==
World Figure Skating Championships

- World Men's Champion – Gosta Sandahl (Sweden)
- World Women's Champion – Opika von Méray Horváth (Hungary)
- World Pairs Champions – Ludowika Jakobsson-Eilers / Walter Jakobsson (Finland)

== Golf ==
Major tournaments

- British Open – Harry Vardon
- US Open – Walter Hagen

Other tournaments

- British Amateur – J L C Jenkins
- US Amateur – Francis Ouimet

== Horse racing ==
England

- Grand National – Sunloch
- 1,000 Guineas Stakes – Princess Dorrie
- 2,000 Guineas Stakes – Kennymore
- The Derby – Durbar
- The Oaks – Princess Dorrie
- St. Leger Stakes – Black Jester

Australia

- Melbourne Cup – Kingsburgh

Canada

- King's Plate – Beehive

Ireland

- Irish Grand National – Civil War
- Irish Derby Stakes – Land of Song

USA

- Kentucky Derby – Old Rosebud
- Preakness Stakes – Holiday
- Belmont Stakes – Luke McLuke

== Ice hockey ==
Stanley Cup

- Toronto Blueshirts wins the National Hockey Association (NHA) championship and their first Stanley Cup.

Events

- Victoria Aristocrats wins the Pacific Coast Hockey Association (PCHA) championship
- Blueshirts play Aristocrats in a challenge series with Blueshirts winning by three games to nil. The NHA and PCHA agree to start an annual playoff in 1915 to decide the Stanley Cup winner.
- Regina Victorias wins the Allan Cup

== Rowing ==
The Boat Race

- 28 March — Cambridge wins the 71st Oxford and Cambridge Boat Race

== Rugby league ==
International

- 1914 Great Britain Lions tour of Australia and New Zealand

England

- Championship – Salford
- Challenge Cup final – Hull F.C. 6–0 Wakefield Trinity at Thrum Hall, Halifax
- Lancashire League Championship – Wigan
- Yorkshire League Championship – Huddersfield
- Lancashire County Cup – Oldham 5–0 Wigan
- Yorkshire County Cup – Huddersfield 19–3 Bradford Northern

Australia

- NSW Premiership – South Sydney (outright winner)

New Zealand

- 1914 New Zealand rugby league season

== Rugby union ==
Five Nations Championship

- 32nd Five Nations Championship series is won by England who complete the Grand Slam

== Speed skating ==
Speed Skating World Championships

- Men's All-round Champion – Oscar Mathisen (Norway)

== Tennis ==
Australia

- Australian Men's Singles Championship – Arthur O'Hara Wood (Australia) defeats Gerald Patterson (Australia) 6–4 6–3 5–7 6–1

England

- Wimbledon Men's Singles Championship – Norman Brookes (Australia) defeats Anthony Wilding (New Zealand) 6–4 6–4 7–5
- Wimbledon Women's Singles Championship – Dorothea Douglass Lambert Chambers (GB) defeats Ethel Thomson Larcombe (GB) 7–5 6–4

France

- French Men's Singles Championship – Max Decugis (France) defeats Jean Samazeuilh (France) 3–6 6–1 6–4 6–4
- French Women's Singles Championship – Marguerite Broquedis (France) defeats Suzanne Lenglen (France) 5–7 6–4 6–3

USA

- American Men's Singles Championship – Richard Norris Williams (USA) defeats Maurice McLoughlin (USA) 6–3 8–6 10–8
- American Women's Singles Championship – Mary Browne (USA) defeats Marie Wagner (USA) 6–2 1–6 6–1

Davis Cup

- 1914 International Lawn Tennis Challenge – Australasia 3–2 United States at West Side Tennis Club (grass) New York City, United States

== Yacht racing ==
- 1914 America's Cup – Resolute competes against the Vanitie but the race is cancelled due to the onset of World War I.
