= History of the America's Cup =

The America's Cup is a is the oldest international competition still operating in any sport.

The cup was originally known as the 'R.Y.S. £100 Cup', awarded in 1851 by the British Royal Yacht Squadron for a race around the Isle of Wight in the United Kingdom. The winning yacht was a schooner called America, owned by a syndicate of members from the New York Yacht Club (NYYC). In 1857, the syndicate permanently donated the trophy to the NYYC, under a Deed of Gift that renamed the trophy as the 'America's Cup' after the first winner and required it be made available for perpetual international competition.

From the first defence of the cup in 1870 until the twentieth defence in 1967, there was always only one challenger. In 1970 multiple challengers applied, so a selection series was held to decide which applicant would become the official challenger and compete in the America's Cup match. This approach has been used for each subsequent competition. The trophy was held by the NYYC from 1857 until 1983. The NYYC successfully defended the trophy twenty-four times in a row before being defeated by the Royal Perth Yacht Club, represented by the yacht Australia II. Including the original 1851 victory, the NYYC's 132-year reign was the longest (in terms of time) winning streak in any sport.

Early matches for the cup were raced between yachts 65–90 ft (20–27 m) on the waterline owned by wealthy sportsmen. This culminated with the J-Class regattas of the 1930s. After World War II and almost twenty years without a challenge, the NYYC made changes to the deed of gift to allow smaller, less expensive 12-metre class yachts to compete; this class was used from 1958 until 1987. It was replaced in 1990 by the International America's Cup Class, which was used until 2007. After a long legal battle, the 2010 America's Cup was raced in 90 ft (27 m) waterline multihull yachts in Valencia, Spain. The victorious Golden Gate Yacht Club then elected to race the 2013 America's Cup in AC72 foiling, wing-sail catamarans and successfully defended the cup. The 2017 America's Cup match was sailed in 50 ft (15 m) foiling catamarans, after legal battles and disputes over the rule changes.

== Origins ==
The America's Cup is the oldest competition in international sport, and the fourth oldest continuous sporting trophy of any kind. The cup itself was manufactured in 1848 and first called the "RYS £100 Cup". It was first raced for on 22 August 1851 around the Isle of Wight off Southampton and Portsmouth in Hampshire, England, in a fleet race between the New York Yacht Club's America and 15 yachts of the Royal Yacht Squadron. The race was witnessed by Queen Victoria and the future Edward VII and won by America. This is considered to be the first America's Cup race.

On 8 July 1857, the surviving members of the America syndicate donated the cup to the New York Yacht Club via the Deed of Gift of the America's Cup filed with the New York Supreme Court. The deed is the primary instrument that governs the rules to make a valid challenge for the America's Cup and the rules of conduct of the races. It states that the cup "is donated upon the condition that it shall be preserved as a perpetual challenge Cup for friendly competition between foreign countries", outlines how a foreign yacht club can make a challenge to the holder of the cup and what happens if they do not agree on how the match should be conducted. The deed makes it "distinctly understood that the cup is to be the property of the club [that has most recently won a match for the cup], subject to the provisions of this deed, and not the property of the owner or owners of any vessel winning a match".

== 1851: America wins the Cup ==
In 1851 Commodore John Cox Stevens, a charter member of the fledgling New York Yacht Club (NYYC), formed a six-person syndicate to build a yacht with intention of taking her to England and making some money competing in yachting regattas and match races. The syndicate contracted with pilot boat designer George Steers for a 101 ft (30.78 m) schooner, which was christened America and launched on 3 May 1851.

On 22 August 1851, America raced against 15 yachts of the Royal Yacht Squadron in the club's annual 53-nautical-mile (98 km) regatta around the Isle of Wight. America won, finishing 8 minutes ahead of the closest rival. Apocryphally, Queen Victoria, who was watching at the finish line, was reported to have asked who was second, the famous answer being: "Ah, Your Majesty, there is no second."

The surviving members of the America syndicate donated the cup via the Deed of Gift of the America's Cup to the NYYC on 8 July 1857, specifying that it be held in trust as a perpetual challenge trophy to promote friendly competition among nations.

== 1870–1881: First challenges ==
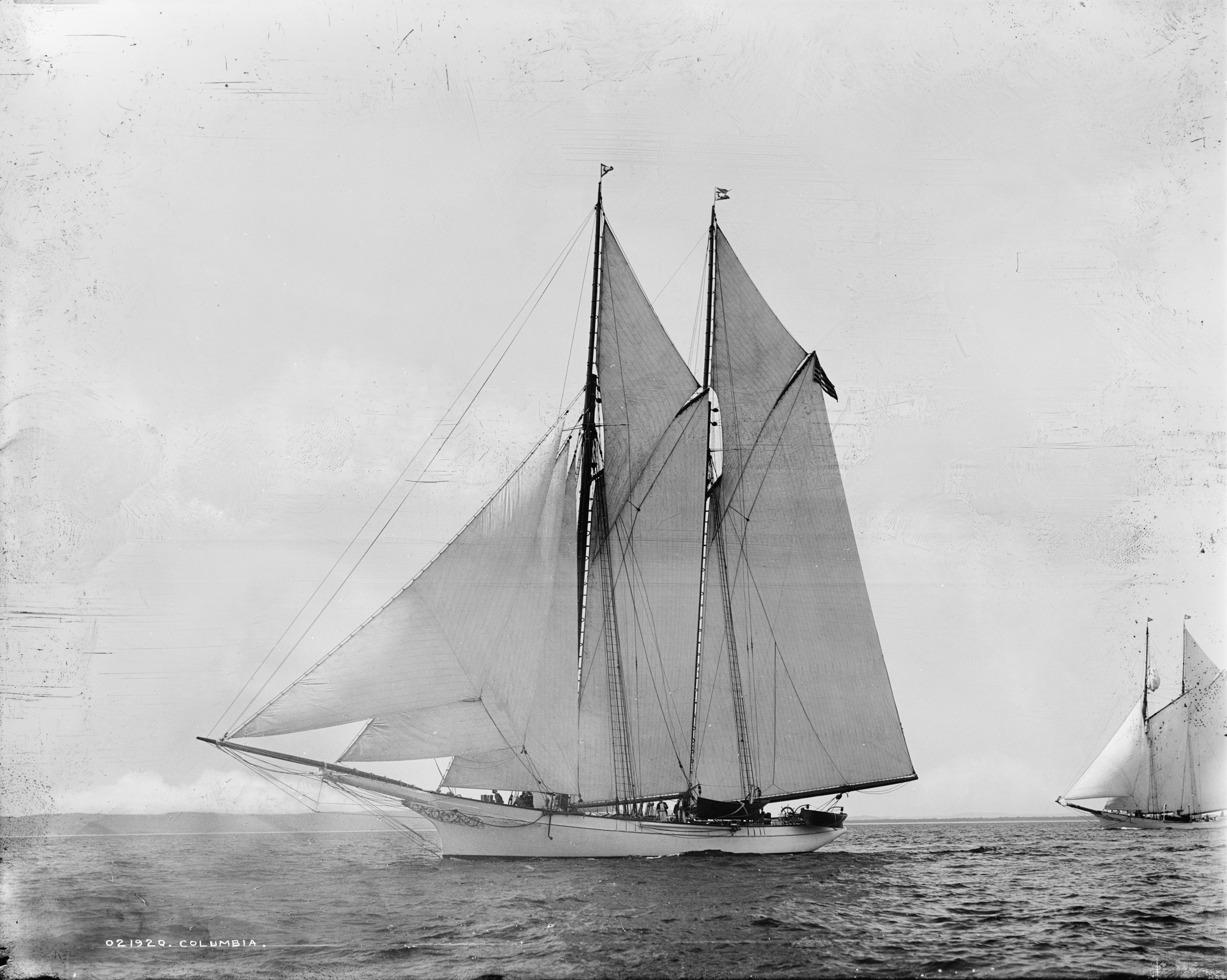
Defender Columbia, 1871

No challenge to race for the Cup was issued until British railway tycoon James Lloyd Ashbury's topsail schooner Cambria (188 tons, 1868 design) beat the Yankee schooner Sappho (274.4 tons, 1867 design) in the Solent in 1868. This success encouraged the Royal Thames Yacht Club in believing that the cup could be brought back home, and officially placed the first challenge in 1870. Ashbury entered Cambria in the NYYC Queen's Cup race in New York City on 8 August against a fleet of seventeen schooners, with time allowed based on their tonnage. The Cambria only placed eighth, behind the aging America (178.6 tons, 1851) in fourth place and Franklin Osgood's Magic (92.2 tons, 1857) in the fleet's lead.

Trying again, Ashbury offered a best-of-seven match race challenge for October 1871, which the NYYC accepted provided a defending yacht could be chosen on the morning of each race. Ashbury's new yacht Livonia (264 tons) was beaten twice in a row by Osgood's new centreboard schooner Columbia (220 tons), which withdrew in the third race after dismasting. The yacht Sappho then stepped in as defender to win the fourth and fifth races, thereby successfully defending the cup. Although the event ended in acrimony, Ashbury was the catalyst for the introduction of greater fairness in no longer allowing the defender to use multiple yachts against a single challenger.

The next challenge, in 1876 from the Royal Canadian Yacht Club, was the first to be disputed between two yachts only. The schooner Madeleine (148.2 tons, 1868), a previous defender from the 1870 fleet race, easily defeated the challenger Countess of Dufferin (221 tons, 1876 design by Alexander Cuthbert). Cuthbert filed the second Canadian challenge, bankrolling, designing and sailing the first sloop challenge for the America's Cup in 1881. The small 65 ft (19.81 m) Canadian challenger Atalanta (84 tons, 1881), representing the Bay of Quinte Yacht Club, suffered from lack of funds, unfinished build and a difficult delivery through the Erie Canal from Lake Ontario to New York. In contrast, the NYYC cautiously prepared its first selection trials. The iron sloop Mischief (79 tons, 1879 design by Archibald Cary Smith) was chosen from four sloop candidates and successfully defended the cup.

== 1885–1887: The NYYC Rule ==
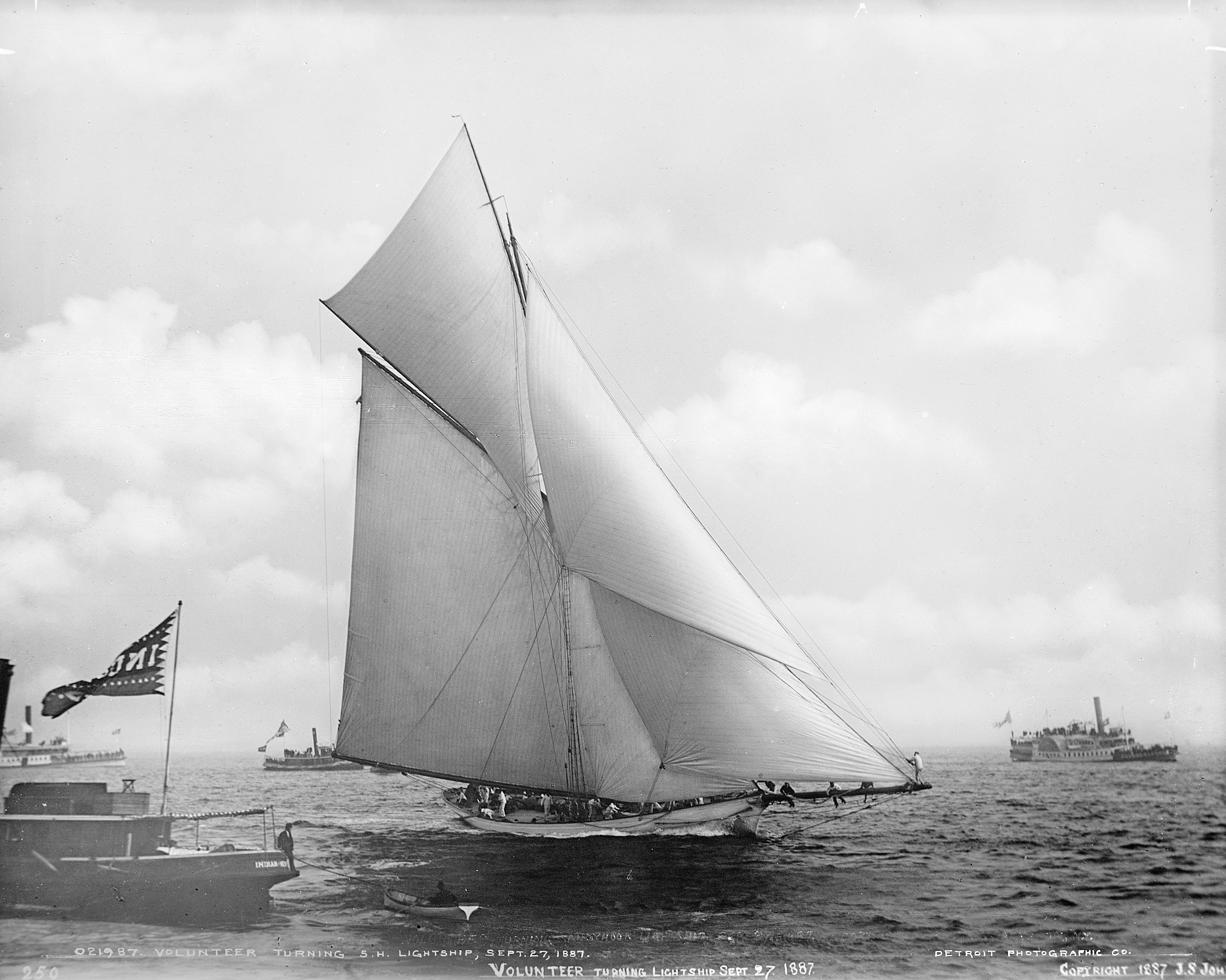
Defender Volunteer, 1887

In response to the unsuccessful Canadian challenges, the Deed of Gift was amended in 1881 to require that challenges be accepted only from yacht clubs on the sea. The Deed was further amended to provide that challenger yachts must sail to the venue on their own hull. Furthermore, Archibald Cary Smith and the NYYC committee devised a new rating rule that would govern the next races. They included sail area and waterline length into the handicap, with penalties on waterlines longer than 85 ft (25.91 m). Irish yacht designer John Beavor-Webb launched the challengers Genesta (1884) and Galatea (1885), which would define the British "plank-on-edge" design of a heavy, deep and narrow-keel hull, making for very stiff yachts ideal for the British breeze. The boats came to New York in 1885 and 1886 respectively, but neither would best the sloops Puritan or Mayflower, whose success in selection trials against many other candidates proved Boston designer Edward Burgess was the master of the "compromise sloop" (lightweight, wide and shallow hull with centerboard). This design paradigm proved ideal for the light Yankee airs.

In 1887, Edward Burgess repeated his success with the Volunteer against Scottish yacht designer George Lennox Watson's challenger Thistle, which was built in secret. Even when the Thistle was drydocked in New York before the races, her hull was draped to protect the secret of her lines, which borrowed from American design. Both Volunteer and Thistle were completely unfurnished below decks to save weight.

== 1889–1903: The Seawanhaka Rule ==
In 1887, the NYYC adopted the Seawanhaka Corinthian Yacht Club's rating rule, in which Bristol, RI, naval architect Nathanael Herreshoff found loopholes that he would use to make dramatic improvements in yacht design and to shape the America's Cup's largest and most extreme contenders. Both Herreshoff and Watson proceeded to merge Yankee sloop design and British cutter design to make very deep S-shape fin-keeled hulls. Using steel, tobin bronze, aluminium, and even nickel for novel construction, they significantly lengthened bow and stern overhangs, further extending the sailing waterline as their boats heeled over, thus increasing their hull speed.

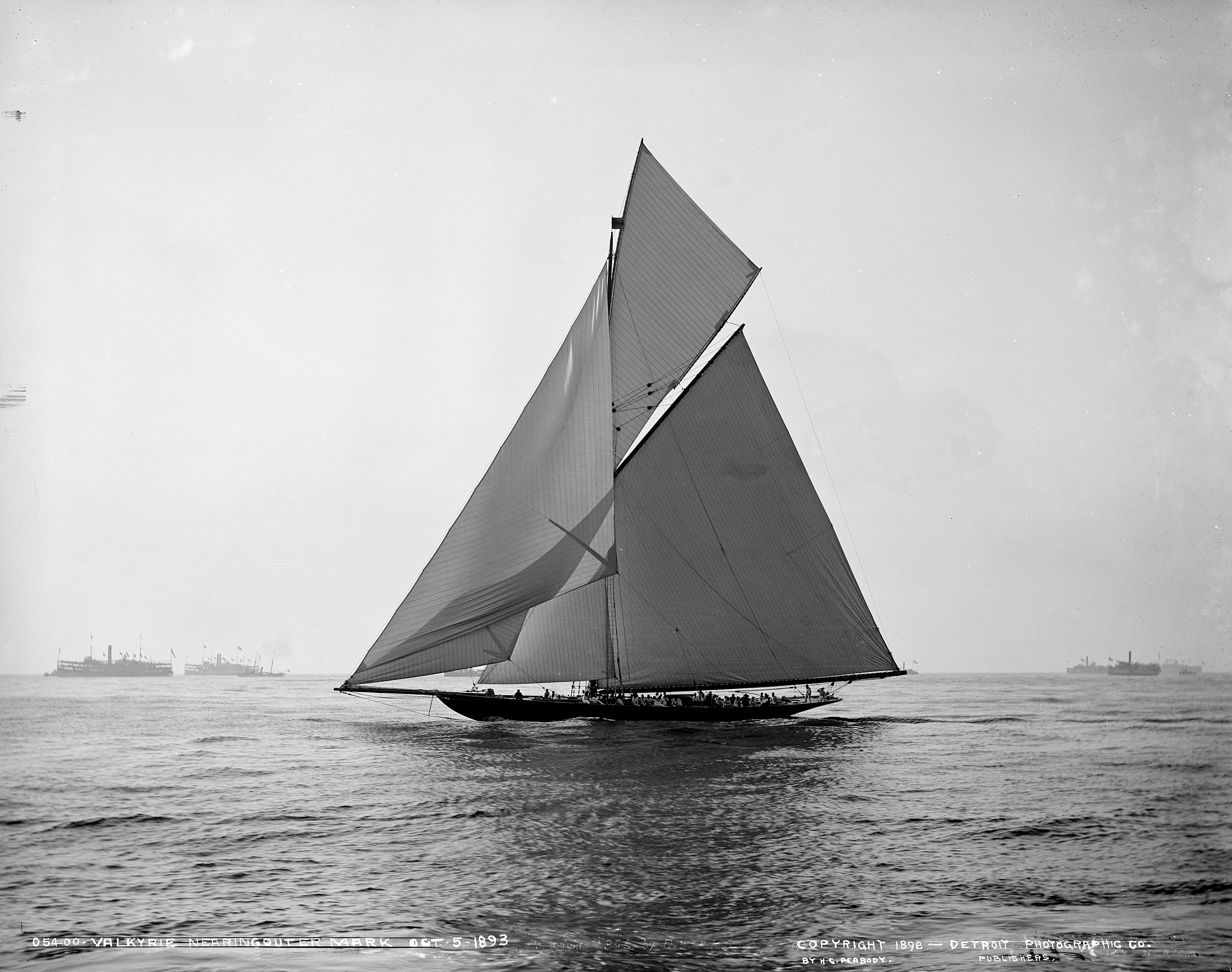
Challenger Valkyrie II, 1893

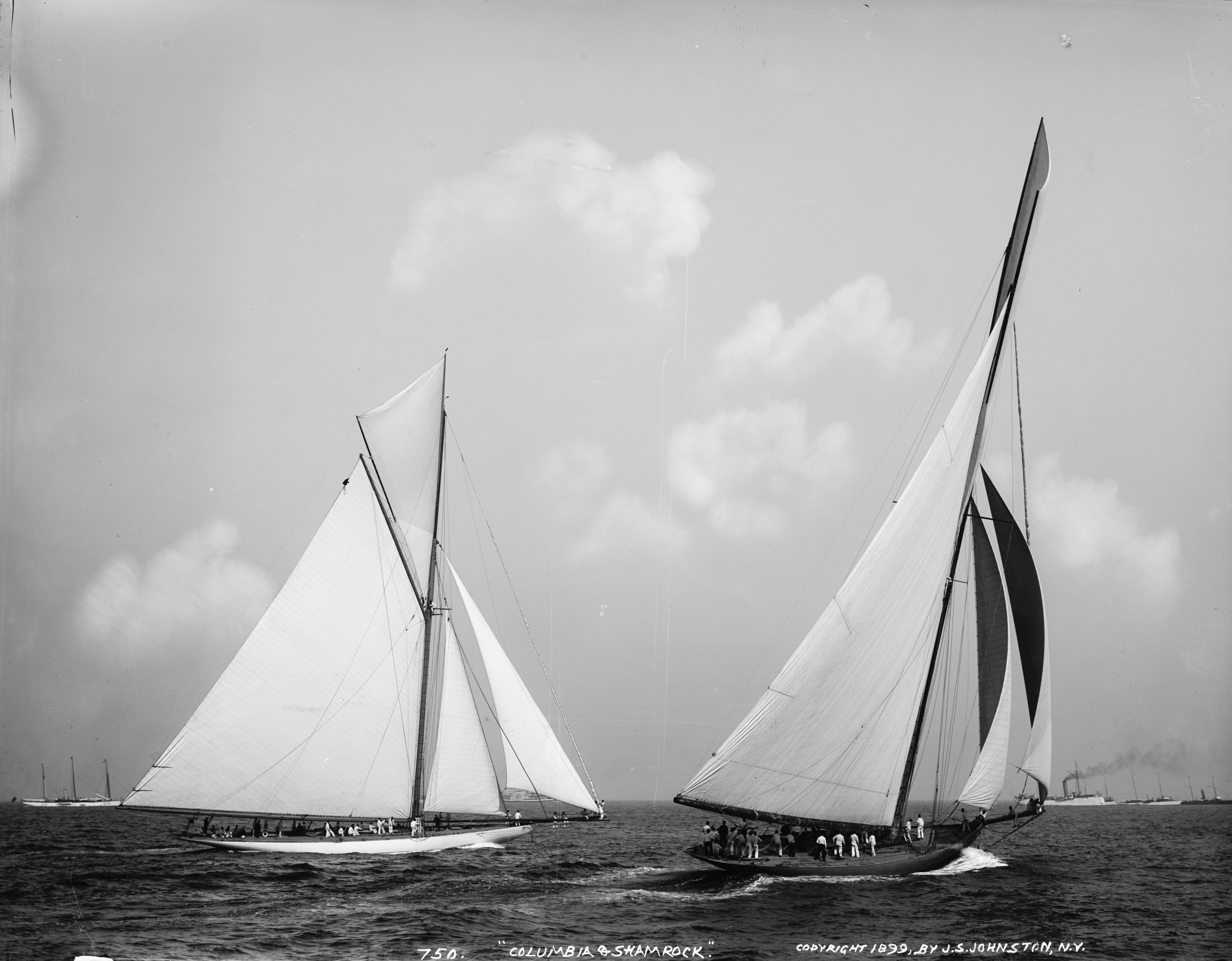
Columbia & Shamrock, 1899

The next America's Cup challenge was initially limited to 70 ft (21.34 m) waterline in 1889, but the mutual-agreement clauses of a new 1887 Deed of Gift caused the Royal Yacht Squadron to withdraw the Earl of Dunraven's promising Watson designed challenger Valkyrie while she was crossing the Atlantic. Dunraven challenged again in 1893, pleading for a return to the longer 85 ft (26 m) limit. In a cup-crazed Britain, its four largest cutters ever were being built, including Watson's Valkyrie II for Dunraven's challenge. Meanwhile, the NYYC's wealthiest members ordered two cup candidates from Herreshoff, and two more from Boston yacht designers. Charles Oliver Iselin, who was running the syndicate behind one of the Herreshoff designs called Vigilant, gave the naval architect leave to design the yacht entirely as he willed. Herreshoff helmed Vigilant himself and beat all his rivals in selection trials, and defended the cup successfully from Valkyrie II.

Urged to challenge again in yet larger boat sizes, Dunraven challenged again in 1895 with a 90 ft (27.43 m) waterline limit. The Watson designed challenger Valkyrie III received many innovations: She would be wider than the defender, and featured the first steel mast. The NYYC ordered another defender from Herreshoff, which he had built in a closed off hangar and launched at night so as to conceal her construction: Defender used an aluminium topside riveted to steel frames and manganese bronze below waters. This saved 17 tons of displacement, but later subjected the boat to extreme electrolysis after the Cup races. Valkyrie III lost the first race, was deemed disqualified in the second race following a collision with Defender before the start line despite finishing first, and in turn withdrew from the contest. The unraveling of the races left Dunraven in a bitter disagreement with all parties over fairness of the cup committee concerning claims. After he asserted that he had been cheated, his honorary membership of the NYYC was revoked. Henry "Hank" Coleman Haff, was inducted into America's Cup Hall of Fame in 2004 for his sailing of Defender in 1895 and bringing the cup back. At age 58, Hank Haff was the oldest cup winner in the history of the race.

The climate was estranged until Scottish businessman Sir Thomas Lipton became the financial backer for the Royal Ulster Yacht Club's 1899 challenge. William Fife was chosen to design the challenging yacht Shamrock because of past success in American waters. The yachts increased yet again in size, and this time Herreshoff fitted a telescopic steel mast to his defender Columbia, but his largest contribution was to recruit Scottish-American skipper Charlie Barr. The latter had helmed Fife designs in Yankee waters before, and he had shown perfect coordination with his hand-picked Scandinavian crew. Barr successfully helmed Columbia to victory, and Lipton's noted fair play provided unprecedented popular appeal to the sport and to his tea brand.

Although upset with the Shamrock, Lipton challenged again in 1901, turning this time to George Lennox Watson for a "cup-lifter": Shamrock II, Watson's fourth and final challenger, was the first cup contender to be thoroughly tank-tested. To defend the Cup, businessman Thomas W. Lawson funded for Boston designer Bowdoin B. Crowninshield a daring project: his yacht Independence was capable of unrivaled performance because of her extremely long sailing waterline, but she was largely overpowered and unbalanced and suffered from structural issues. Furthermore, Lawson's failure to commit to the NYYC's terms for defending the Cup defaulted the Independenceʼs elimination. Herreshoff had again received a commission from the NYYC, but had failed to secure Charlie Barr to skipper his new yacht Constitution. Instead, the Columbiaʼs syndicate kept Barr's crew and tried another defense. Unexpectedly, Barr led the Columbiaʼs crew to win the selection trials, and to successfully defend the cup again.

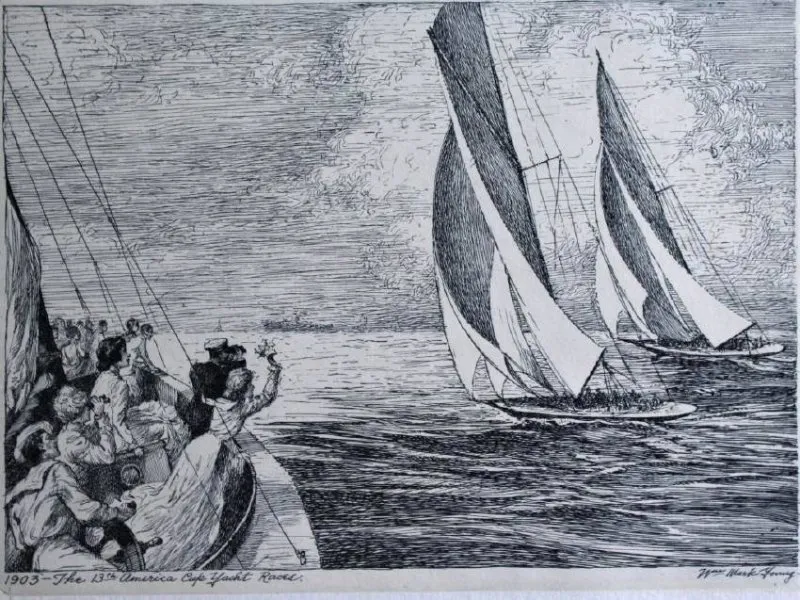
1903 The 13th America Cup Yacht Race, an etching by William Mark Young

Lipton persisted in a third challenge in 1903. With the aim to fend off Lipton's challenges indefinitely, the NYYC garnered a huge budget for a single cup contender, whose design would be commissioned to Herreshoff again. Improving on the Independence and his previous designs, the new defender Reliance remains the largest race sloop ever built. She featured a ballasted rudder, dual-speed winches below decks, and a cork-decked aluminium topside that hid running rigging. The design focus on balance was exemplary, but the extreme yacht also required the skills of an excellent skipper, which defaulted choice options to Charlie Barr. Facing the equally bold challenger Shamrock III, Barr led the Reliance to victory in just three races.

== 1914–1937: The Universal Rule ==
Despite the immense success of the Reliance, she was used only one season, her design and maintenance keeping her from being used for any other purpose than for a cup defense. The extremity of both 1903 cup contenders encouraged Nathanael Herreshoff to make boats more wholesome and durable by devising a new rule. Proposing in the same year the Universal Rule, he added the elements of overall length and displacement into the rating, to the benefit of heavy, voluminous hulls and also divided boats into classes, without handicapping sail area. This went against the American Yacht Clubs' and the British Yacht Racing Association's general desire to promote speed at all costs for cup boats, but the NYYC adopted Herreshoff's proposal. Lipton long pleaded for a smaller size of yachts in the new rule, and the NYYC conceded to seventy-five footers in 1914. Lipton turned to Charles Ernest Nicholson for his fourth challenge, and got a superb design under the inauspicious shape of Shamrock IV, with a flat transom. She was the most powerful yacht that year, and the NYYC turned out three cup candidates to defend the cup: of George Owen's Defiance and William Gardner's Vanitie, it was Herreshoff who designed the wisest of all contenders. His last design for the cup, the Resolute, was small, which earned significant time allowance over other yachts. Barr had died, but his crew manned the Resolute, which faced stiff competition from Vanitie, but went on to win the selection trials, before the Cup was suspended as World War I broke out.

Shamrock IV was crossing the Atlantic with the steam yacht Erin, destined for the British Imperial fortress colony of Bermuda, when Britain declared war on Germany on 5 August 1914. Harold Stirling Vanderbilt, the Commodore of the New York Yacht Club, had sent his own yacht, the Vagrant, from Rhode Island to Bermuda to meet them and escort them to the US. The Vagrant arrived on the 8th. Having no radio, the crew remained unaware of the declaration of war. Finding all navigational markers missing, the Vagrant crew attempted to pick their own way in through the barrier reef. St. David's Battery fired a warning shot to bring them to a halt. Shamrock IV and Erin arrived the next day. The America's Cup was cancelled for that year.

The Shamrock IV and Erin proceeded to New York, from where the Erin returned to Britain while Shamrock IV was laid up in the Erie Basin dry dock until 1920, when she received some adjustments to her build and ballast, just before the races were held. Despite Shamrock IV's severe rating, she took the first two races from the defender Resolute, and came closer to winning back the Cup than any previous challenger. The Resolute won every subsequent race of the event.

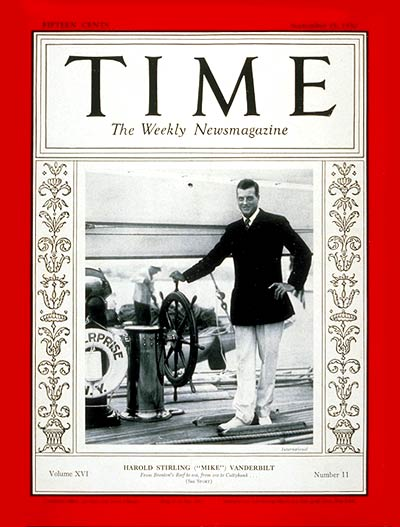
Harold Vanderbilt, Enterprise's skipper, 1930

Shamrock IV was never raced again, but the universal rule drew significant appeal, especially in the small M-Class. Believing that the new rule offered a serious opportunity for the British to take the Cup, Lipton challenged for the fifth and last time at age 79, in 1929. The J-Class was chosen for the contest, to which were added Lloyds' A1 scantling rules in order to ensure that the yachts would be seaworthy and evenly matched, given the Deed of Gift requirement for yachts to sail to the match on their "own bottom." The waterline length was set between 76 ft (23.16 m) and 88 ft (26.82 m), and there would be no time allowance. Novel rigging technology now permitted the Bermuda rig to replace the gaff rig. Nicholson was chosen to design challenger Shamrock V, and despite the Wall Street crash, four NYYC syndicates responded to the threat and built a cup contender each. The venue was moved to Newport, Rhode Island, where, the Herreshoff Manufacturing Company's new naval architect Starling Burgess used his success in the M-Class and his experience as a wartime plane designer to build the Vanderbilt syndicate's defender Enterprise, the smallest J-Class. Meanwhile, Herreshoff's son, L. Francis Herreshoff, designed a radical boat: The Whirlwind, despite being the most advanced boat with her double-ended "canoe" build and electronic instruments, maneuvered too clumsily. The old 75-footers Resolute and Vanitie were rebuilt and converted to the J-Class to serve as trial horses. The Enterprise's skipper Harold Vanderbilt won the selection trials with great difficulty. When Shamrock V was revealed, she was an outdated wooden boat with a wooden mast and performed poorly to windward. Enterprise was then fitted with the world's first duralumin mast, very lightweight at 4,000 lb (1,800 kg), and beat her opponent soundly.

Lipton died in 1931, and English aviation industrialist Sir Thomas Sopwith bought Shamrock V with the intent of preparing the next challenge. To Nicholson's skills, he added aeronautical expertise and materials that would intensify the rivalry into a technological race. In 1934, the Royal Yacht Squadron issued a challenge for Sopwith's newly built challenger Endeavour. Being steel-plated, she was less disfavoured than Shamrock V, especially after a minimum mast weight limit was set to 5,500 lb (2,500 kg), as this made American duralumin technology less advantageous for this contest. Endeavour received significant innovations, but Sopwith failed to secure the services of his entire Shamrock V professional crew due to a pay strike. He hired amateurs to complete his team, and while the Endeavour was described unanimously as the faster boat in the Cup, taking the first two races, failed tactics and crew inexperience lost her the following four races to Vanderbilt's new defender Rainbow.

To challenge again, Sopwith prepared himself a year early. In 1936, Nicholson designed and built the Endeavour II to the maximum waterline length allowed, and numerous updates to the rig made her even faster than her predecessor. A change in the America's Cup rules now allowed a contending yacht to be declared 30 days before the races, so both the Endeavour and Endeavour II were shipped to Newport, where the RYS held selection series before declaring Endeavour II as the challenger. Meanwhile, Harold S. Vanderbilt, taking all syndicate defense costs to himself, commissioned Starling Burgess and the young designer Olin Stephens to provide designs. They anonymously produced three designs each, and thoroughly tank-tested boat models of the six designs, until model 77-C was selected for its projected performance in light airs. The resulting defender Ranger was even more accomplished than her challenger, and Vanderbilt steered his last J-Class boat to a straight victory.

== 1956–1987: The Twelve-Metre Rule ==
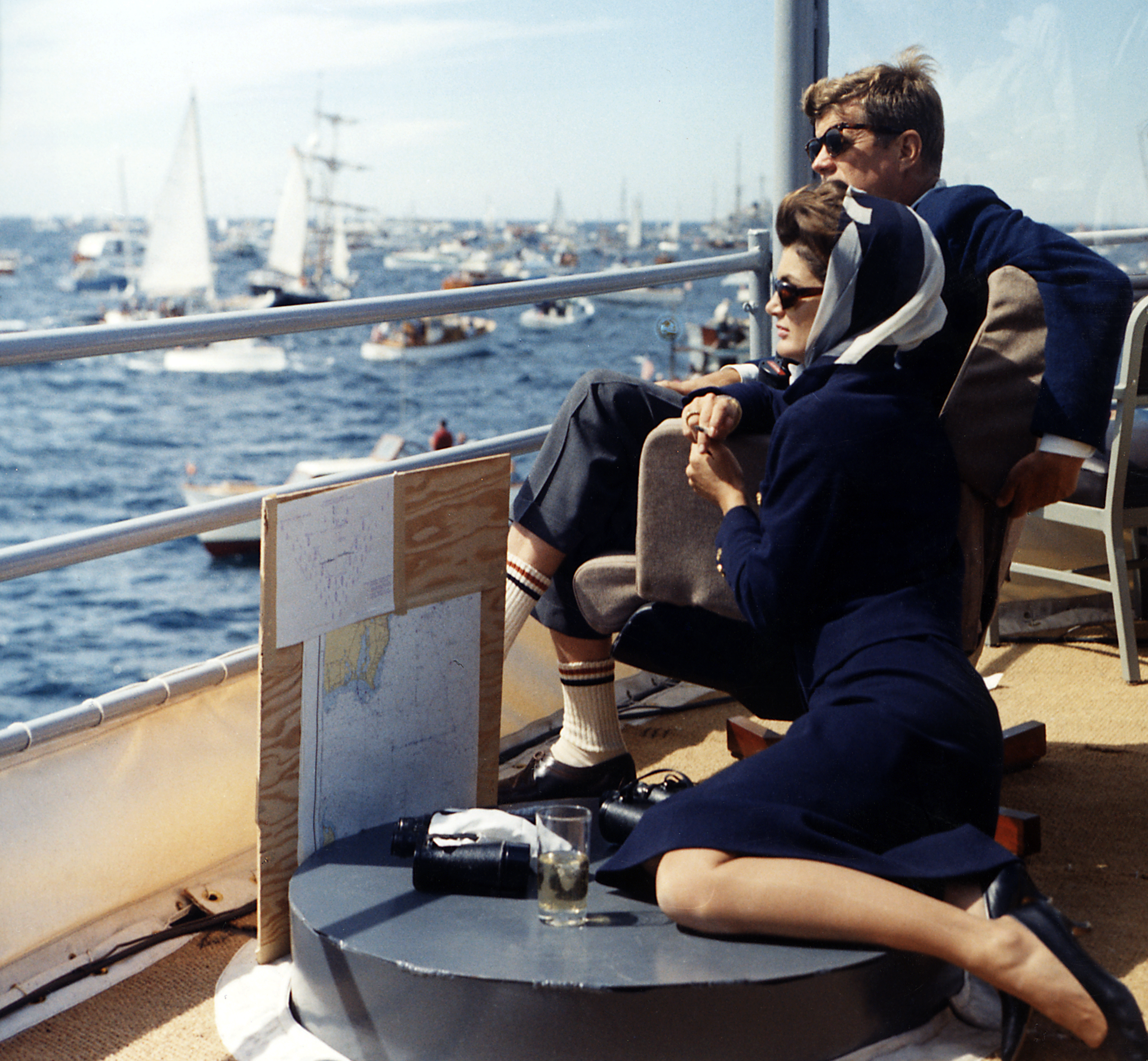
President Kennedy and wife watching the America's Cup, 1962

The J-class yachts from the 1930s remained the default for the cup, but post-war economic realities meant that no-one could afford to challenge in this hugely expensive class. As twenty years had passed since the last challenge, the NYYC looked for a cheaper alternative in order to restart interest in the cup. In 1956 Henry Sears led an effort to replace the J-class yachts with 12-metre class yachts, which are approximately 65 to 75 feet (20 to 23 m) in overall length.

The first post-war challenge was in 1958, again from the British. Briggs Cunningham, the inventor of the Cunningham sail control device, as skipper with Sears as navigator led Columbia to victory against Sceptre, which was designed by David Boyd at Alexander Robertson & Sons, for a Royal Yacht Squadron Syndicate, chaired by Hugh Goodson.

The first Australian challenge was in 1962, when Gretel lost to the NYYC's Weatherly, designed by Philip Rhodes and helmed by Emil Mosbacher.

A second Boyd/Robertson challenger, Sovereign, lost to the Olin Stephens–designed Constellation in 1964. In 1967, another Australian challenger, Dame Pattie, lost to the innovative Olin Stephens design Intrepid, skippered again by Emil Mosbacher (which won again in 1970, to become the second yacht, after Columbia of 1899–1901, to defend the Cup twice).

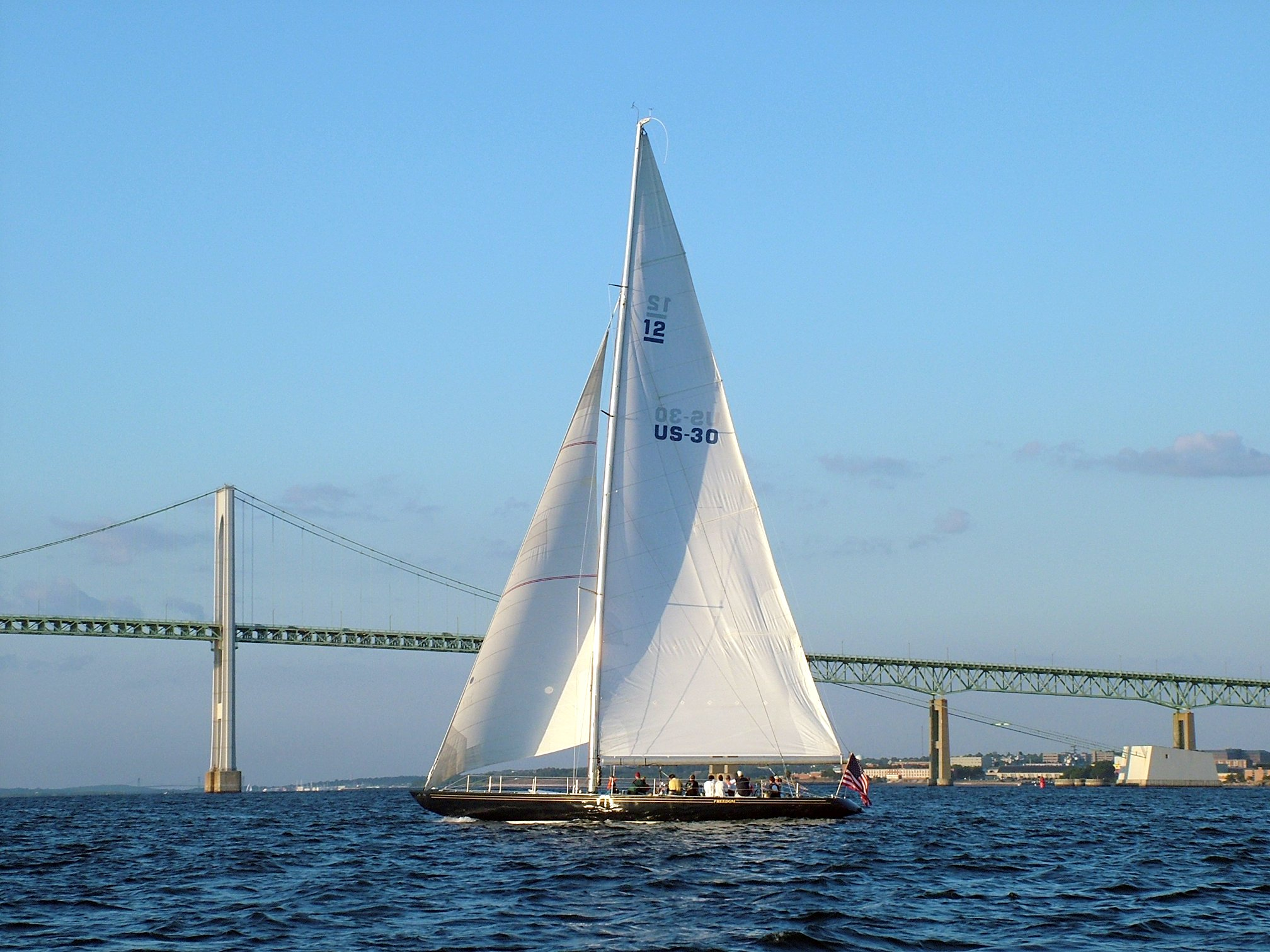
Defender Freedom, 1980

For the 1970 America's Cup, interest in challenging was so high that the NYYC allowed the Challenger of Record (the original yacht club presenting the challenge accepted for the match) to organize a regatta among multiple challengers with the winner being substituted as challenger and going on to the cup match. This innovation has been used ever since, except for the default deed of gift matches in 1988 and 2010.

Alan Bond, an Australian businessman, made three unsuccessful challenges between 1974 and 1980. In 1974 the cup was successfully defended by Courageous, which successfully defended again in 1977, at which time she was skippered by Ted Turner. In 1980 the Cup was defended by Freedom.

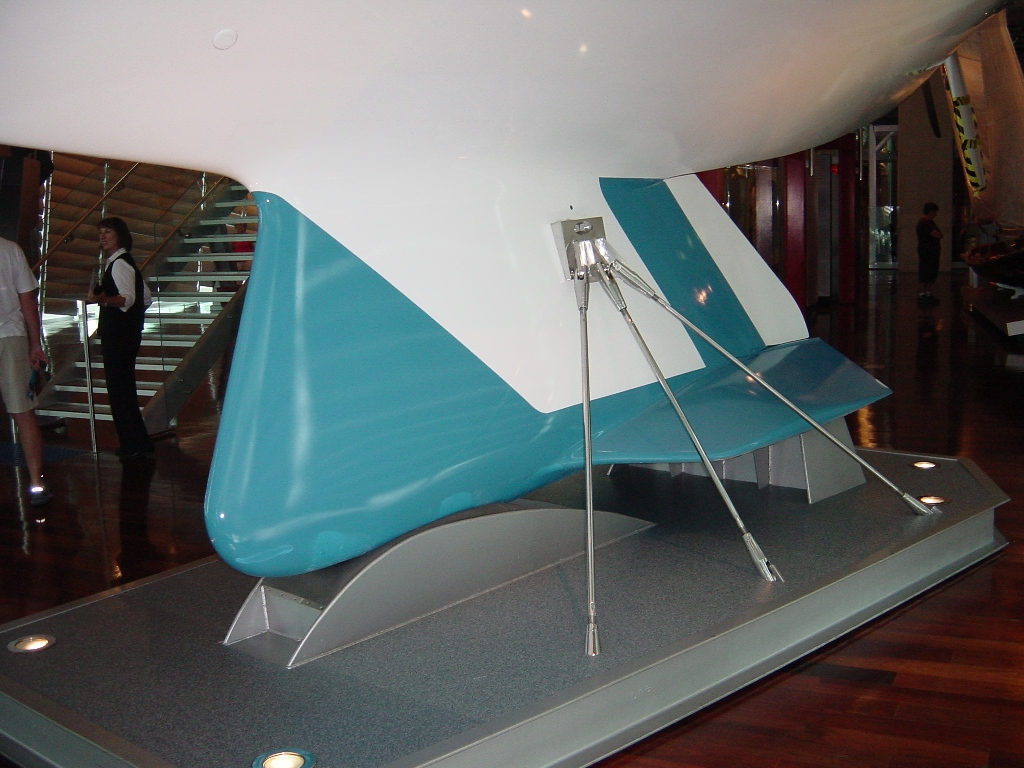
The winged keel of the victorious challenger Australia II, 1983

Bond returned in 1983 for a fourth challenge, complete with a symbolic golden wrench which he claimed would be used to unbolt the cup from its plinth, so that he could take it back to Australia. In 1983 there were seven challengers for the cup competing for the inaugural Louis Vuitton Cup, the winner of which would go on to the America's Cup match against the NYYC's yacht selected in their trials. Bond's yacht, Australia II, designed by Ben Lexcen, skippered by John Bertrand, and representing the Royal Perth Yacht Club, easily won the Louis Vuitton challenger series, and Dennis Conner in Liberty was selected for NYYC's Cup defense.

Sporting the now famous Boxing Kangaroo flag and the controversial winged keel designed by Ben Lexcen, the hull of Australia II was kept under wraps between races and was subject to attempts by the NYYC to disqualify the boat. In the cup races, the Australians got off to a bad start with equipment failures and false starts giving the USA defenders a head start. But it was not to be a repeat of the last 132 years: the Australians came back and, despite a 3–1 deficit at the start of the fifth race, won the 1983 America's Cup 4–3 in a best-of-seven format. This was the first time the NYYC had lost the cup in 132 years and 26 challenges and opened the opportunity for other US Clubs to earn the trophy in future races. The Australians joked that they planned to run over the cup with a steamroller and rename it "The America's Plate".

For the first time since its inception the America's Cup was defended outside of the US off the coast of Fremantle. This was a new era for the cup with interest in competing being shown by many countries.

Now representing his hometown San Diego Yacht Club, Conner returned to win the 1987 America's Cup. His yacht Stars & Stripes 87 earned the right to challenge by winning the 1987 Louis Vuitton Cup against an unprecedented field of 13 challenger syndicates. In the America's Cup regatta he faced defender Iain Murray sailing Kookaburra III, who had beaten Alan Bond's Australia IV in the defender selection trials. Stars & Stripes 87 swept Kookaburra III in four straight races for the title.

Technology was now playing an increasing role in yacht design. The 1983 winner, Australia II, had sported the revolutionary winged keel, and the New Zealand boat that Conner had beaten in the Louis Vuitton Cup final in Fremantle was the first 12-metre class to have a hull of fiberglass, rather than aluminum or wood.

The 12-metre class rules stipulated that the hull had to be the same thickness throughout and could not be made lighter in the bow and stern. The other challengers demanded that core samples be taken from the plastic hull to show its thickness. At one press conference Dennis Conner asked, "Why would you build a plastic yacht ... unless you wanted to cheat?" Despite attempts to defuse the situation, the "cheating comment" added to the controversy surrounding the Louis Vuitton challenge races. Chris Dickson, skipper of the Kiwi Magic (KZ 7), took the controversy in stride and with humour, and Conner has since stated his regret over his comment. New Zealand syndicate head Sir Michael Fay's comment was that core samples would be taken "over my dead body". Eventually some small holes were drilled to test the hull, and ultrasonic testing was done to rule out air pockets in the construction. The boat was found to be within class rules, and the issue was set aside. Fay ceremoniously lay down in front of the measurer before the samples were taken.

Years later, a less than contrite Conner would say he was "glad" he lost the race as the effort to regain the cup following his loss focused attention from more than just the narrow interest of yachting enthusiasts. Although unsaid, loss of the cup also allowed it to be won not only by the New York Yacht Club but by other US yacht clubs as well, such as Conner's own San Diego Yacht Club in future series.

== 1988: The Mercury Bay Challenge ==
In 1987, soon after Conner had won back the cup with Stars and Stripes but before San Diego Yacht Club had publicly issued terms for the next regatta, a New Zealand syndicate, again led by merchant banker Sir Michael Fay, lodged a surprise challenge. Fay challenged with a gigantic yacht named New Zealand (KZ1) or the Big Boat, which with a 90-foot (27 m) waterline, was the largest single masted yacht possible under the original rules of the cup trust deed. This was an unwelcome challenge to San Diego Yacht Club, who wanted to continue to run Cup regattas using 12-metre yachts. A legal battle ensued over the challenge, with Justice Carmen Ciparick of the New York State Supreme (trial) Court (which administers the Deed of Gift) ruling that Fay's challenge on behalf of Mercury Bay Boating Club (MBBC) was valid. The court ordered SDYC to accept it and negotiate mutually agreeable terms for a match, or to race under the default provisions of the Deed, or to forfeit the cup to MBBC.

Forced to race, and lacking time for preparation, Conner and SDYC looked for a way to prevail. They recognized that a catamaran was not expressly prohibited under the rules. Multihulls, due to a lower wetted surface area and vastly lower mass, are inherently faster than equal-length monohulls. Conner, however, left nothing to chance and commissioned a cutting-edge design with a wing sail, named—as his 12-metre yachts had been—Stars and Stripes.

The two yachts raced under the simple terms of the deed in September 1988. New Zealand predictably lost by a huge margin. Fay then took SDYC back to court, arguing that the race had been unfair, certainly not the "friendly competition between nations", envisaged in the Deed of Gift. Ciparick agreed and awarded New Zealand the Cup. However, Ciparick's decision was overturned on appeal and SDYC's win was reinstated. Fay then appealed to New York's highest court and lost. Thus SDYC successfully defended the cup in what observers described as the most controversial cup match to that point. (The 2010 America's Cup was a direct descendant of the 1988 cup, featuring two gigantic multi-hull yachts and would generate even more legal activity and controversy).

== 1992–2007: The IACC rule ==
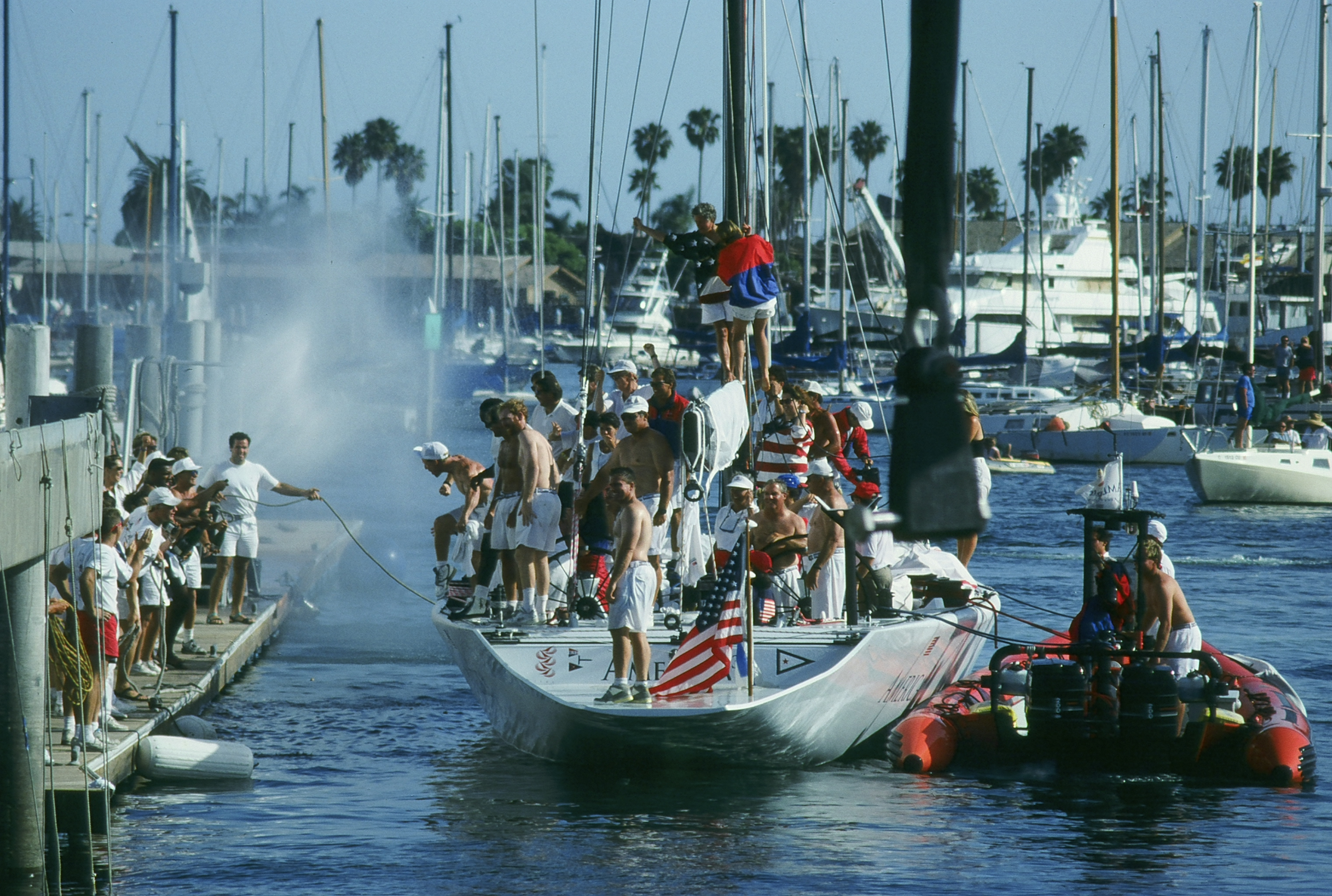
Defender America^{3}, 1992

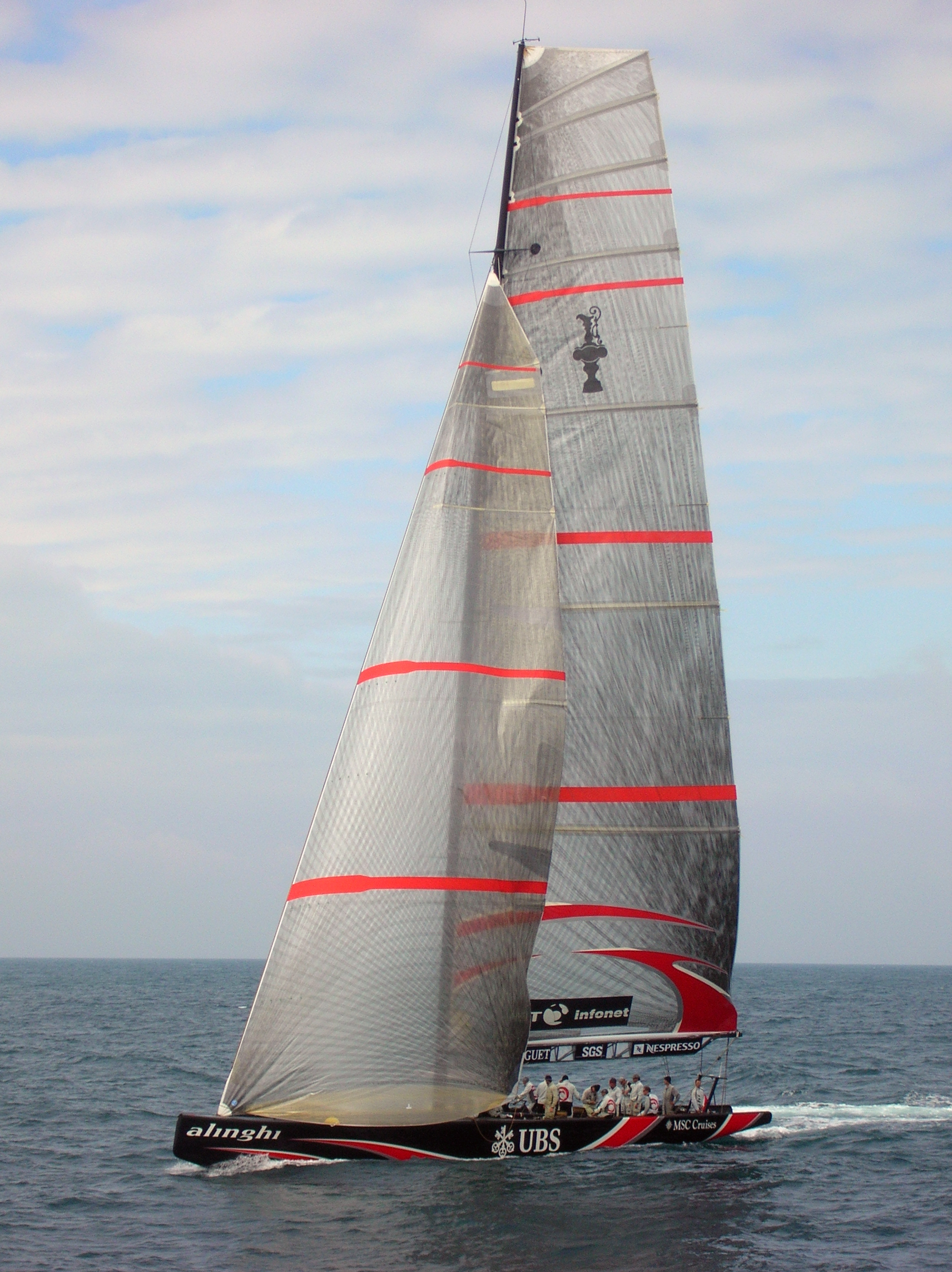
Defender SUI-100, 2007

In the wake of the 1988 controversies, the International America's Cup Class (IACC) was introduced, replacing the 12-metre class that had been used since 1958.

In 1992, for the first time, the challenger yacht club, Venice Compagnia della Vela hailed from a non English-speaking country. After winning the Louis Vuitton Cup, the Challenger Il Moro di Venezia (owned by the billionaire Raul Gardini), was defeated 4–1 by USA-23 of the America³ team, skippered by billionaire Bill Koch and Olympic medalist Harry "Buddy" Melges.

In 1995, the Royal New Zealand Yacht Squadron syndicate Team New Zealand, skippered by Russell Coutts, first won the challenger series in NZL 32, dubbed "Black Magic" because of her black hull and uncanny speed. Black Magic then easily swept Dennis Conner's Stars & Stripes team, in five straight races to win the title for New Zealand. Although team Young America's cup candidate yacht USA-36 was defeated in defender trials by Stars & Stripes' USA-34, San Diego Yacht Club elected to defend the cup with USA-36 crewed by Stars & Stripes. The run-up to the 1995 Cup was notable for the televised sinking of oneAustralia during the fourth round robin of the Louis Vuitton challenger selection series, with all hands escaping uninjured. The 1995 defender selection series also had the first mostly female (with one man) crew sailing the yacht USA-43, nicknamed Mighty Mary.

On 14 March 1996, a man entered the Royal New Zealand Yacht Squadron's clubroom and damaged the America's Cup with a sledgehammer. The man, Benjamin Peri Nathan, was charged and found guilty of criminal damage and sentenced to 34 months imprisonment (reduced to 18 months on appeal). The damage was so severe that it was feared that the cup was irreparable. London's Garrards silversmiths, who had manufactured the cup in 1848, painstakingly restored the trophy to its original condition over three months, free of charge. In 2003, an extra 20 cm was added to the cup's base to accommodate the names of future winners.

At Auckland in 1999–2000, Team New Zealand, led by Sir Peter Blake, and again skippered by Russell Coutts, defeated the Italian Prada Challenge from the Yacht Club Punta Ala. The Italians had previously beaten the AmericaOne syndicate from the St Francis Yacht Club in the Louis Vuitton Cup final. This was the first America's Cup to be contested without an American challenger or defender.

During the Twelve-Metre era, the New York Yacht Club, citing the Deed language that the Cup should be "perpetually a Challenge Cup for friendly competition between foreign countries", had adopted several interpretive resolutions intended to strengthen nationality requirements. By 1980, these resolutions specified that besides being constructed in the country of the challenger or defender, a yacht had to be designed by and crewed by nationals of the country where the yacht club was located. Globalization made it increasingly difficult to enforce design nationality rules, and starting in 1984, the Royal Perth Yacht Club began relaxing this requirement. Numerous members of the New Zealand AC 2000 team became key members of the Swiss 2003 Alinghi challenge, led by biotechnology entrepreneur Ernesto Bertarelli. To satisfy the crew nationality requirements, New Zealand team members of Alinghi took up residence in Switzerland.

In 2003, several strong challengers vied for the right to sail for the cup in Auckland during the challenger selection series. Bertarelli's team representing the Swiss yacht club, Société Nautique de Genève (SNG), beat all her rivals in the Louis Vuitton Cup and in turn won the America's Cup in a five-race sweep. In doing so, Alinghi became the first European team in 152 years of the event's history to win the cup.

For the 2007 challenge, SNG rescinded all interpretive resolutions to the deed, essentially leaving "constructed in country" as the only remaining nationality requirement. This allowed the next event, the 2007 defense of the cup, to be held in Valencia, Spain. It was the first time since the original 1851 Isle of Wight race that the America's Cup regatta had been held in Europe, and in a country different from that of the defender (necessary because Switzerland, despite having huge lakes and a national passion for sailing, does not border a "sea or arm of the sea" as specified in the Deed). Eleven challenging yacht clubs from 9 countries submitted formal entries. The challenger selection series, the Louis Vuitton Cup 2007, ran from 16 April to 6 June 2007. Emirates Team New Zealand won the challenger series finale 5–0 against Italians Luna Rossa and met Alinghi between 23 June and 3 July 2007. Ernesto Bertarelli's Team- Alinghi successfully defended the America's Cup 5–2, under the colors of SNG.

== 2010: The Golden Gate Challenge ==
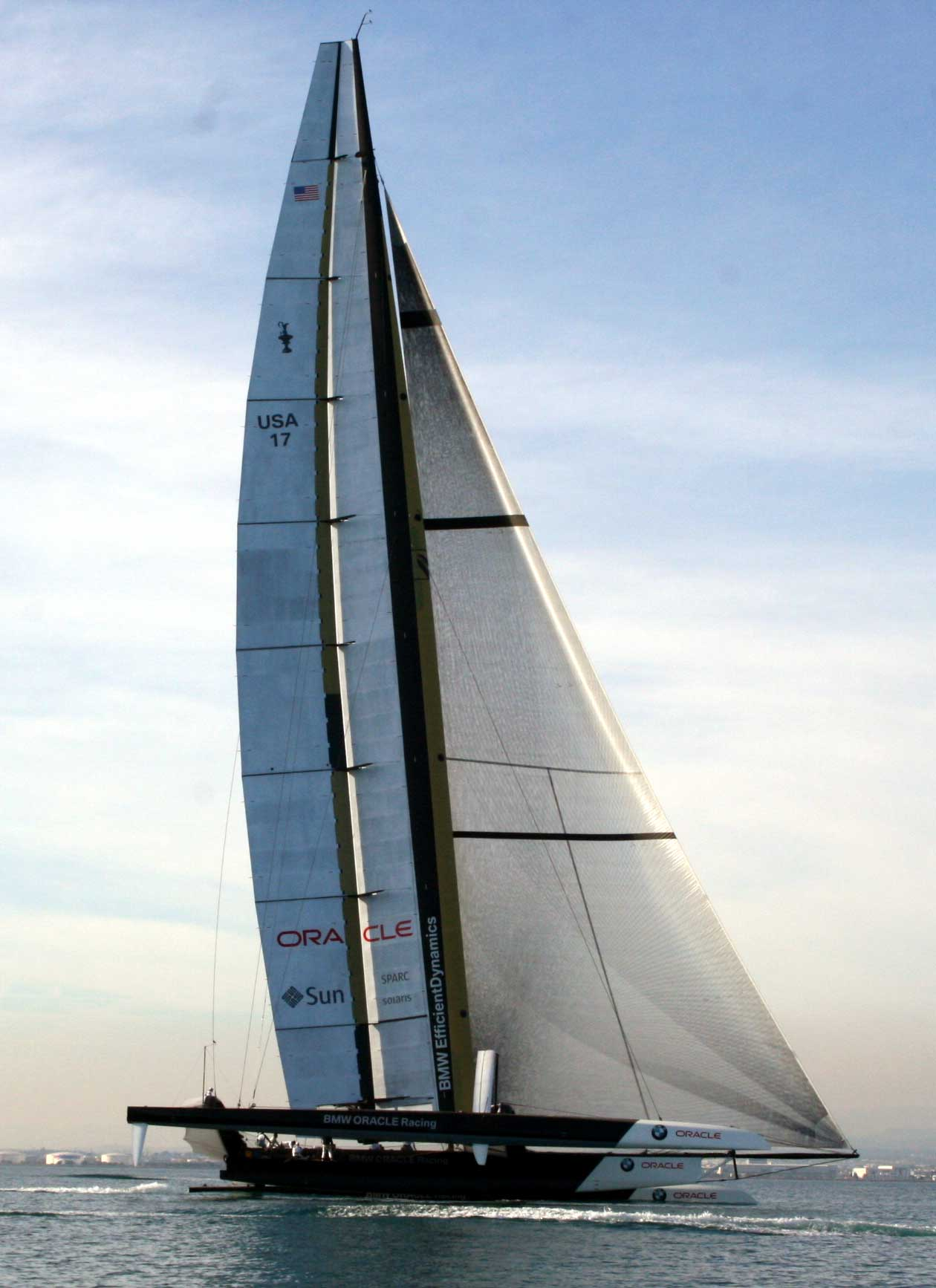
Challenger USA-17, 2010

After Société Nautique de Genève successfully defended the trophy in the 32nd America's Cup, they accepted a challenge from Club Náutico Español de Vela, a Spanish yacht club formed expressly for the purpose of challenging for the cup and keeping the regatta in Valencia. When SNG and CNEV published their protocol for the 33rd America's Cup, there was criticism over its terms, with some teams and yacht clubs calling it the worst protocol in the history of the event. Golden Gate Yacht Club (GGYC) then filed its own challenge for the cup and also filed a court case asking that CNEV be removed as being unqualified under the deed of gift, and that GGYC be named the challenger, being the first club to file a conforming challenge.

There followed a long and acrimonious legal battle, with the New York Court of Appeals finally deciding on 2 April 2009 that CNEV did not qualify as valid challenger, and that the GGYC was thus the rightful challenger.

Since the two parties were unable to agree otherwise, the match took place as a one-on-one Deed of Gift (Note: The language for this eventuality is: "In case the parties cannot mutually agree upon the terms of a match, then three races shall be sailed, and the winner of two of such races shall be entitled to the Cup. All such races shall be on ocean courses, free from headlands, as follows: The first race, twenty nautical miles (37 km) to windward and return; the second race an equilateral triangular race of thirty-nine nautical miles, the first side of which shall be a beat to windward; the third race (if necessary) twenty nautical miles (37 km) to windward and return; and one week day shall intervene between the conclusion of one race and the starting of the next race. These ocean courses shall be practicable in all parts for vessels of twenty-two feet draught of water, and shall be selected by the Club holding the Cup; and these races shall be sailed subject to its rules and sailing regulations so far as the same do not conflict with the provisions of this deed of gift, but without any times allowances whatever. The challenged Club shall not be required to name its representative vessel until at a time agreed upon for the start, but the vessel when named must compete in all the races, and each of such races must be completed within seven hours." See also: Deed of Gift on Wikisource.) match with no other clubs or teams participating.

The match was sailed in gigantic, specialized 90 ft (27 m) multihull yachts in a best-of-three race series in Valencia, Spain from 8 to 14 February 2010. The rigid wing sail of the challenging trimaran USA-17 provided a decisive advantage, and it won the 2010 America's Cup in two straight races.

== 2013–2017: The catamaran rules ==
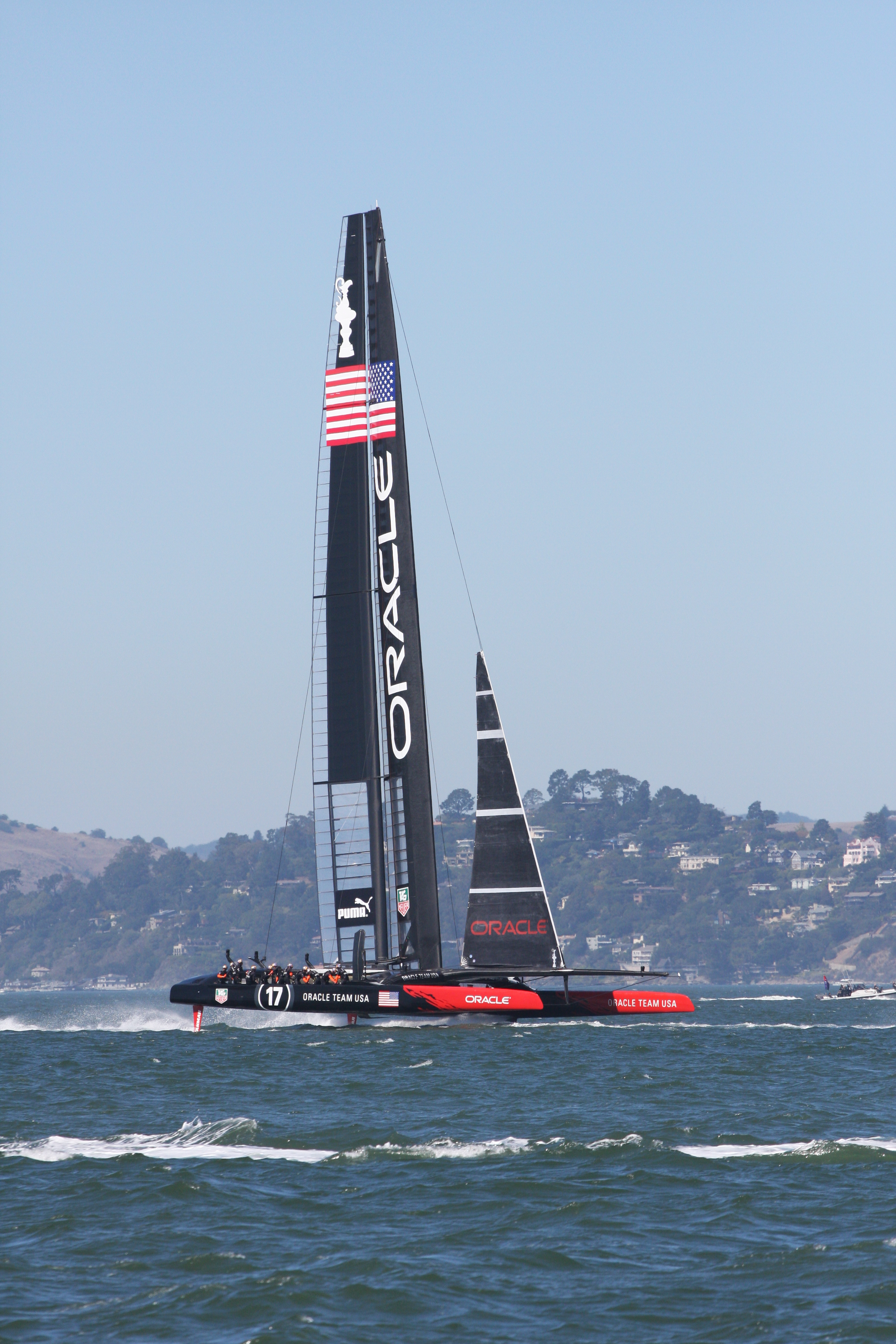
Defender Oracle, 2013

The Challenger of Record for the 34th America's Cup was Club Nautico di Roma, whose team Mascalzone Latino had competed in the challenger selection series for the 2007 America's Cup. In September 2010, the GGYC and Club Nautico di Roma announced the protocol for AC34, scheduling the match for 2013 in a new class of boat, the AC72, a wing-sailed catamaran. Paralleling the "Acts" of the 32nd America's Cup—a series of preliminary events in different venues leading-up to the actual event—a new series, the America's Cup World Series was to be run using AC45 class boats (smaller one-design versions of the AC72s), in various world venues in 2011 and 2012.

On 12 May 2011, Club Nautico di Roma withdrew from the competition, citing challenges in raising sufficient funds to field a competitive team. As the second yacht club to file a challenge, the Royal Swedish Yacht Club assumed the duties of the challenger.

Rumors of stable hydrofoiling of an AC72 were confirmed when Team New Zealand's AC72 yacht Aotearoa was seen to be sailing on hydrofoils in August 2012. This triggered a technology race in foil development and control. The Royal New Zealand Yacht Squadron won the right to sail in the America's Cup match easily beating the Italian and Swedish challengers in the Louis Vuitton Cup. The resulting match between the US and NZ was the longest on record both in calendar time, and the number of races, with the Golden Gate Yacht Club staging an improbable come-from-behind victory, winning eight straight races to defend the cup and beat New Zealand 9–8.

Oracle Team USA was defending the America's Cup 26 May – 27 June 2017 on behalf of the Golden Gate Yacht Club in Bermuda where racing took place on the Great Sound. Preliminary races were held in Portsmouth, Gothenburg, and Bermuda in foiling AC45s. After the 2013 America's Cup, the Golden Gate Yacht Club accepted a notice of challenge from the Hamilton Island Yacht Club, with whom a new protocol and a smaller 62 ft (19 m) wingsail foiling catamaran class rule were proposed in cooperation with participating challengers. The Hamilton Island Yacht Club withdrew from the America's Cup in July 2014, citing unanticipated cost in mounting its challenge.

The exiting challenger of record was replaced by a challenger committee, where decisions are made by popular vote. When an even smaller 50ft wingsail foiling catamaran class rule amendment was voted in April 2015, Luna Rossa Challenge also withdrew, citing significant costs wasted on the development of the larger vessel. Yachts from France, Japan, New Zealand, Sweden, and the UK remained in the competition to challenge for the cup. In June 2016, for the first time in history, an America's Cup race included fresh water sailing, when preliminary races were held on Lake Michigan and based in Chicago, Illinois. Emirates Team New Zealand won the 2017 Louis Vuitton Cup and then challenged the defender, Oracle Team USA. New Zealand won the America's Cup with a score of 7 to 1.

== 2021 America's Cup ==
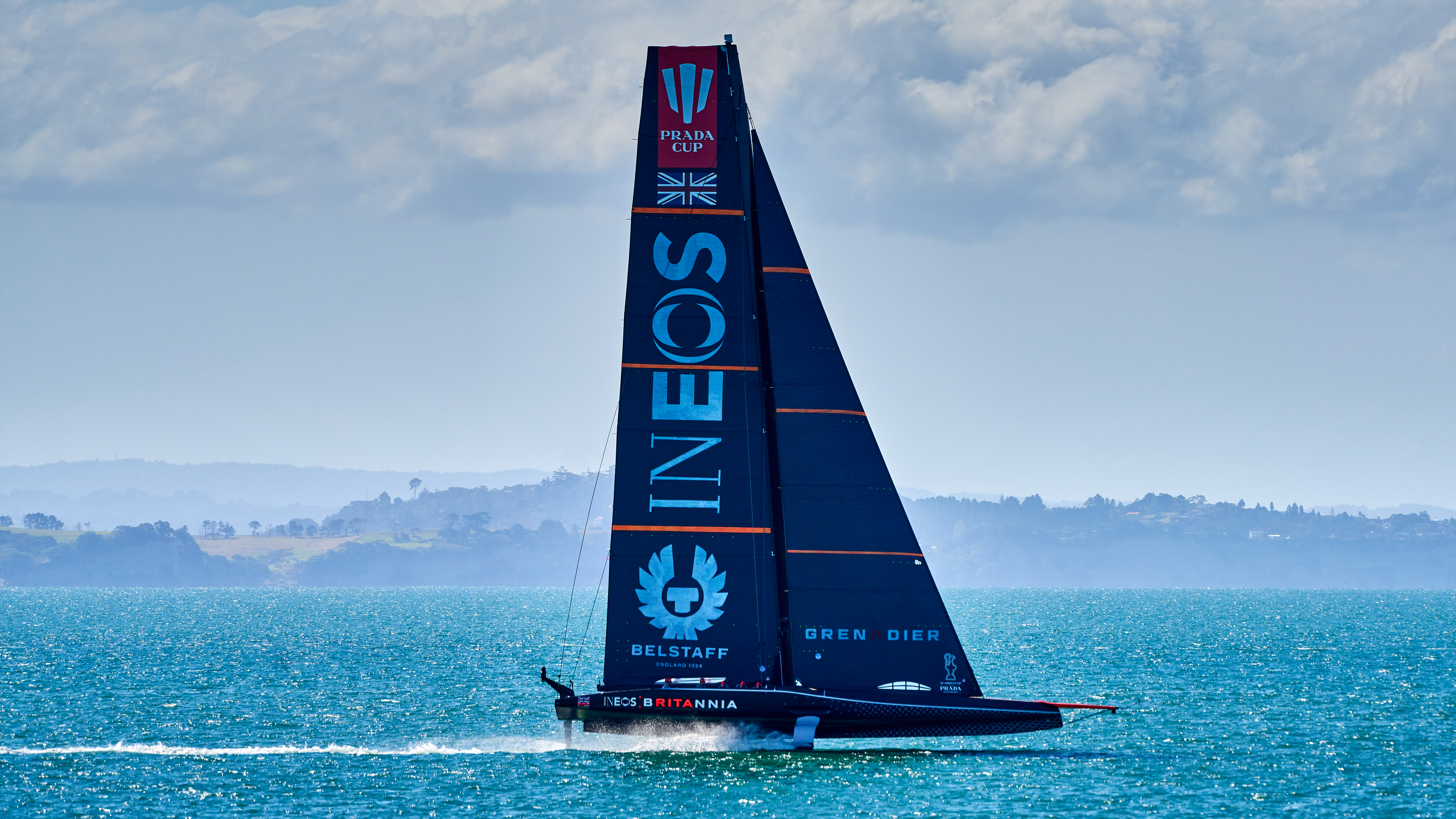
The AC75 design

The 36th iteration of the America's Cup saw the Royal New Zealand Yacht Squadron defend the cup in Auckland New Zealand in the early southern autumn in March 2021, with the challenger series, the Prada Cup, sailed in the summer between December 2020 and February 2021. For the 2021 America's Cup, a new design rule, the "AC75" AC75 was agreed between the Defender (the Royal NZ Yacht Squadron, Emirates Team New Zealand) and the Challenger of Record (Luna Rossa Prada Pirelli). The AC75 would be a 75' foiling monohull with common design components of the canting foil mechanics and software, and a limit of a total of 6 foil and rudder "packages" during the complete campaign. The Challenger was Luna Rossa Prada Pirelli, the winner of 2021 Prada Cup. The start of AC36, scheduled for 6 March 2021, was delayed to 10 March due to COVID-19 restrictions in place in Auckland.

Emirates Team New Zealand sailing AC75 Te Rehutai defended the 36th America's Cup title in Auckland New Zealand on 17 March 2021, beating the Italian challenger Luna Rossa Prada Pirelli by 7 victories to 3. Despite being sailed in light and testing conditions (wind speeds never exceeded 15 knots well within the 21 knots allowed) on the Hauraki Gulf, the new AC75 boats foiled at speeds in excess of 30 knots on both windward and leeward legs. A show was performed on and off water with thousands of spectator boats, and thousands more land based spectators. The racing courses were in the inner Hauraki Gulf, positioned for land-based viewing – particularly the "Stadium Course", course "C" which was the scene of the more prominent race of the regatta with a come-from-behind victory for the defender. Positive sporting respect was noted by both teams during the post competition team interviews.

On 19 March 2021, Emirates Team New Zealand confirmed that the Royal New Zealand Yacht Squadron has accepted a Notice of Challenge for the 37th America's Cup (AC37) from the Royal Yacht Squadron Racing, represented by INEOS TEAM UK, which will act as the Challenger of Record for AC37. The following statement was made :

"The Royal New Zealand Yacht Squadron have received and accepted a challenge for the 37th America's Cup from our long-standing British friends at Royal Yacht Squadron Racing." Said Aaron Young – RNZYS Commodore. "It is great to once again have the RYSR involved, given they were the first yacht club that presented this trophy over 170 years ago, which really started the legacy of the America's Cup. Along with Emirates Team New Zealand, we look forward to working through the details of the next event with them."

A Protocol Governing 37th America's Cup will be published within eight months including the provisions outlined in this release.

- It has been agreed the AC75 Class shall remain the class of yacht for the next two America's Cup cycles, and agreement to this is a condition of entry.
- The teams will be restricted to building only one new AC75 for the next event.
- A single Event Authority will be appointed to be responsible for the conduct of all racing and the management of commercial activities relating to AC37.
- The Defender and the Challenger of Record, will be investigating and agreeing a meaningful package of campaign cost reduction measures including measures to attract a higher number of Challengers and to assist with the establishment of new teams.
- A new Crew Nationality Rule will require 100% of the race crew for each competitor to either be a passport holder of the country the team's yacht club as at 19 March 2021 or to have been physically present in that country (or, acting on behalf of such yacht club in Auckland, the venue of the AC36 Events) for two of the previous three years prior to 18 March 2021. As an exception to this requirement, there will be a discretionary provision allowing a quota of non-nationals on the race crew for competitors from "Emerging Nations".
- There are a number of different options but it is intended that the Venue for the Match will be determined within six months and the dates of racing announced in the Protocol, if not before.
