= King's Cup (yachting) =

The New York Yacht Club (NYYC) King's Cup (retired, now known as the Queen's Cup) refers to prestigious sailing trophies awarded by the club, historically gifted by royalty, with recent prominent events including the Rolex NYYC Invitational Cup for international amateur clubs.

== Winners ==
Year, yacht, owner

- 1906, Effort (yacht), F. M. Smith
- 1907, Queen (yacht), John Rogers Maxwell
- 1908, Avenger (yacht), Robert Wales Emmons II
- 1909, Istalena (yacht), George Mallory Pynchon
- 1939, Resolute, Charles Francis Adams III
