= Defiance (yacht) =

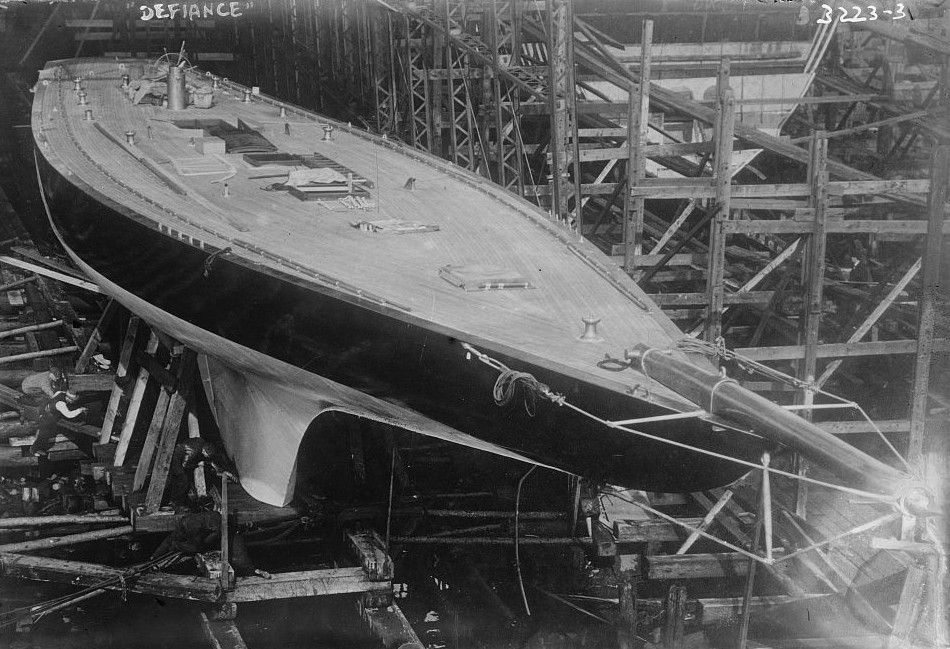
Hull of the Defiance

Defiance was a yacht built by George Owen for a syndicate of New York City, Philadelphia, and Boston sportsmen headed by George M. Pynchon to compete in the trials to select the defender for the 1914 America's Cup. The outbreak of World War I in 1914 caused the Cup races for that year to be delayed until 1920.

== History ==
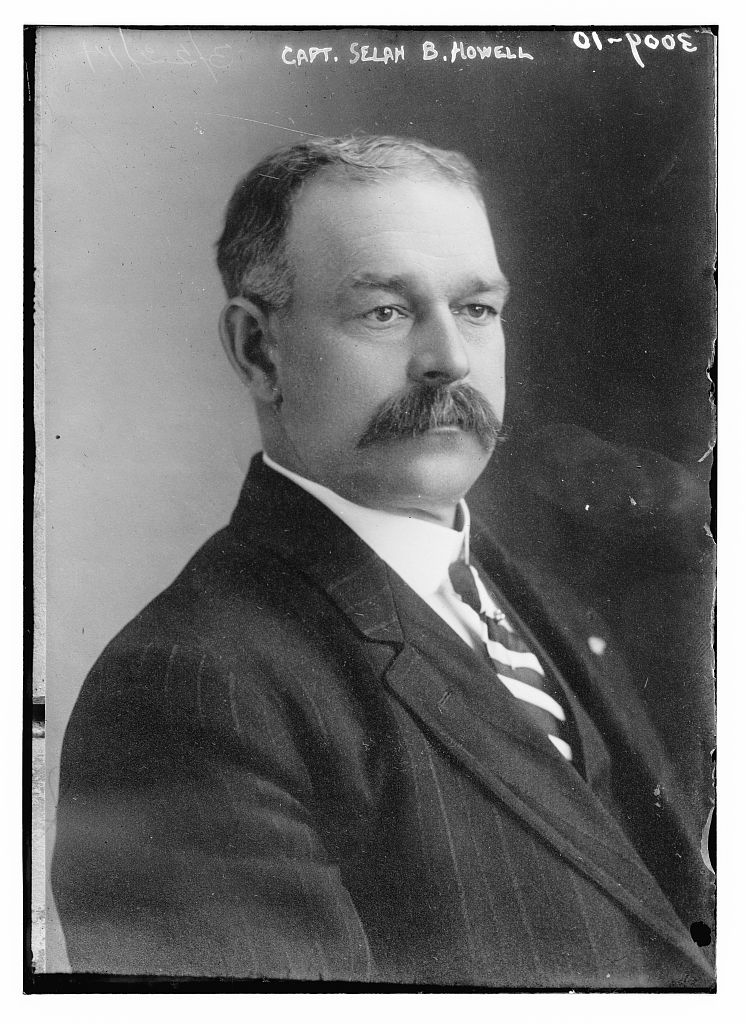
Selah B. Howell of the Defiance

She was built for $63,000 at the Bath Iron Works. The new design had problems from the beginning. Her sail spread was so great that the frail body, even with its load of lead as ballast, could not stand the strain. Twice the designers reduced the sails and had her mast cut down in size. The yacht was withdrawn from the competition during the trial races. Commodore E. W. Clark, treasurer of the owning syndicate, bought out all the other interests in her in an attempt to rebuild or change her rigging so that she could race again. By this time over $100,000 had been spent on building and modifying her. By January 6, 1915, the yacht was sold as scrap metal. The boat contained seventy tons of lead in her keel.

== Owners ==
- Commodore E. W. Clark of the Philadelphia Corinthian Yacht Club
