= USS Phenakite =

Patrol vessel of the United States Navy

Coordinates: 39°04′52.40″N 84°50′55.16″W

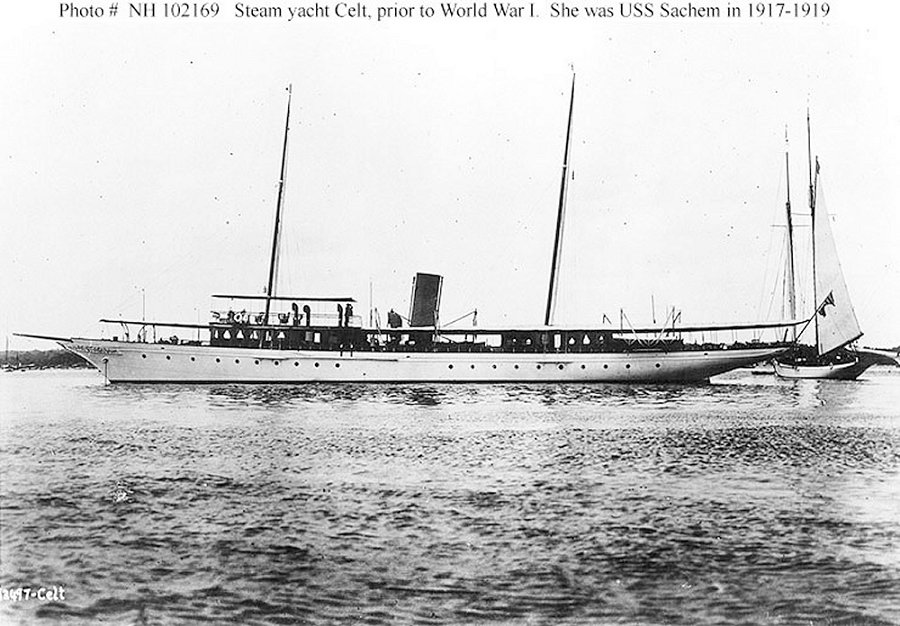
- Steam yacht Celt prior to World War I

History

United States
- Name: Celt
- Owner: J. Rogers Maxwell
- Builder: Pusey and Jones, Wilmington, Delaware
- Launched: 12 April 1902
- Fate: transferred to USN 3 July 1917

United States
- Name: USS Sachem
- Acquired: 3 July 1917
- Commissioned: 19 August 1917
- Identification: SP-192
- Fate: transferred back to owner 10 February 1919

United States
- Owner: Manton B. Metcalf
- Acquired: 10 February 1919
- Fate: Sold to Jacob "Jake" Martin and converted to a fishing boat 1932

United States
- Owner: Jacob "Jake" Martin
- Acquired: 1932
- Fate: reacquired by the Navy 17 February 1942 for $65,000 and converted for Naval service at Robert Jacobs Inc., City Island, New York

United States
- Name: USS Phenakite
- Cost: $65,000
- Acquired: 17 February 1942
- Commissioned: 1 July 1942 at Tompkinsville, New York
- Decommissioned: 17 November 1944
- Identification: PYc-25
- Fate: transferred to the Maritime Commission for disposal 5 November 1945

United States
- Name: USS Phenakite
- Owner: Maritime Commission
- Acquired: 5 November 1945
- Identification: PYc-25
- Fate: returned to her original owner, Mr. J. Martin of Brooklyn, New York, and renamed Sachem on 29 December 1945

United States
- Name: Sachem
- Owner: J. Martin
- Acquired: 29 December 1945
- Fate: Subsequently resold to the Circle Line of New York City and renamed Sightseer

United States
- Name: Sightseer
- Owner: Circle Line of New York City
- Fate: Renamed Circle Line V; Reportedly scrapped in 1984; Found abandoned outside of Lawrenceburg, Indiana, on the Kentucky side of the Ohio River; Presently under the custody of the D'Andrea LaRosa Art Foundation.

General characteristics
- Displacement: 317 long tons (322 t); 360 long tons (370 t) (1942)
- Length: 186 ft 3 in (56.77 m); 183 ft (56 m) (1942)
- Beam: 22 ft 6 in (6.86 m)
- Draft: 8 ft (2.4 m); 9 ft 7 in (2.92 m) (1942)
- Installed power: 1,200 shp (890 kW); 805 shp (600 kW) (1936)
- Propulsion: vertical triple-expansion steam engine, one shaft; 7-cylinder Fairbanks-Morse 37D 14 diesel engine (1936)
- Speed: 15 kn (17 mph; 28 km/h); 13.5 kn (15.5 mph; 25.0 km/h) (1942)
- Armament: 1917-; 1 × 6-pounder; 2 × 3-pounders; 2 × machine guns; 1942-; 1 × 3 in (76 mm)/23 cal; 4 × .5 in (13 mm)Browning Machine Gun, Cal. .50, M2, HB, single anti-aircraft guns (4x1); 2 × Mark 6 Depth charge racks

USS Phenakite (PYc-25) was a converted yacht that was used by the United States Navy during World War I and World War II. The vessel was also known as Celt, Sachem (SP-192), Sightseer and Circle Line V.

== History ==
USS Phenakite (PYc-25) was built 1902 as the yacht Celt by Pusey and Jones, Wilmington, Delaware, for J. Rogers Maxwell, a railroad executive. It was launched on 12 April 1902.

Shortly after the United States' entry into the First World War, it was acquired by the US Navy on 3 July 1917. The ship was placed in service as USS Sachem (SP 192) on 19 August and used as a Coastal Patrol Yacht. During its Navy service, it was loaned to inventor Thomas Edison who conducted government-funded experiments with it to develop countermeasures to U-boats.

After the end of World War I, Sachem was returned to her owner, Manton B. Metcalf of New York, on 10 February 1919. It was later sold to Philadelphia banker Roland L. Taylor and then to Jacob "Jake" Martin of Brooklyn, New York in 1932 who converted it to a fishing excursion boat.

The yacht was reacquired by the Navy on 17 February 1942 for $65,000 and converted for naval service at Robert Jacobs Inc., City Island, New York. It was commissioned as USS Phenakite (PYc-25) on 1 July at Tompkinsville, New York and patrolled the waters off the Florida Keys during World War II. It was decommissioned to undergo modifications and placed back in service on 17 November 1944. It was used for testing sonar systems before being placed out of service on 2 October 1945 at Tompkinsville, and transferred to the Maritime Commission for disposal on 5 November.

The vessel was then returned to her previous owner, Martin, and renamed Sachem on 29 December. It was struck from the Naval Register 7 February 1946. It was subsequently resold to the Circle Line of New York City and renamed Sightseer, but was later renamed Circle Line V. It served as a tour boat until 1983.

In 1986, a Cincinnati local named Robert Miller purchased the ship for the low price of $7,500 and spent 10 days restoring the yacht so it could make the journey to the Midwest. After using the boat to take friends out on New York Harbor for the ceremonial relighting of the Statue of Liberty during the 4 July weekend, Miller took the boat back home via the Hudson River, the Great Lakes, the Mississippi River, and the Ohio River before settling at the mouth of Taylor Creek near its confluence with the Ohio River on Miller's property in Boone County, Kentucky.

Unable to afford expensive repairs needed to save it, Miller left the boat to rust away on Taylor Creek where it remains to this day. The decayed and abandoned boat is a popular destination for kayak enthusiasts in the Cincinnati area and is commonly referred to as "The Ghost Ship."

The boat currently sits on private property.

Robert Miller died in 2016.

== Pop culture ==
Before leaving New York Harbor, the boat was used in Madonna's 'Papa Don't Preach' music video in 1986. While the boat was being worked on one day, a limousine pulled up to the dock and a representative for Madonna asked if they could use the ship in an upcoming music video. Miller agreed and the boat can briefly be seen in the video.

== Awards ==
For her service in the U.S. Navy, Sachem / Phenakite earned the following awards:

- World War I Victory Medal
- American Campaign Medal
- World War II Victory Medal
