= J. Rogers Maxwell =

Personal information
- Full name: John Rogers Maxwell, Jr
- Born: July 6, 1875
- Died: April 11, 1932 (aged 56)

Sailing career
- Sport: Sailing

John Rogers Maxwell, Jr. (July 6, 1875 – April 11, 1932) was the winner of the 1907 King's Cup with his yacht Queen.

== Biography ==
He was born in 1875 to John Rogers Maxwell, Sr.

Maxwell Sr. commissioned, circa 1902, the steam yacht Celt which went on to serve as the USS Sachem in the First World War and as the USS Phenakite during World War II. The yacht also had careers as a fishing yacht and tour boat.
