= Taylor Creek (Ohio River tributary) =

Stream in Kentucky, USA

Coordinates: 39.08228°N 84.84884°W

Taylor Creek is a stream in Boone County, Kentucky, United States. It is a tributary of the Ohio River.

Taylor Creek has the name of Rev. John Taylor, a pioneer citizen.

The ruins of USS Phenakite lies abandoned in Taylor Creek.

== See also ==
- List of rivers of Kentucky
