= Frank M. Smith =

American yacht racer

Frank M. Smith was the winner of the 1906 King's Cup with his yacht Effort.
