= Lorin F. Deland =

American football coach

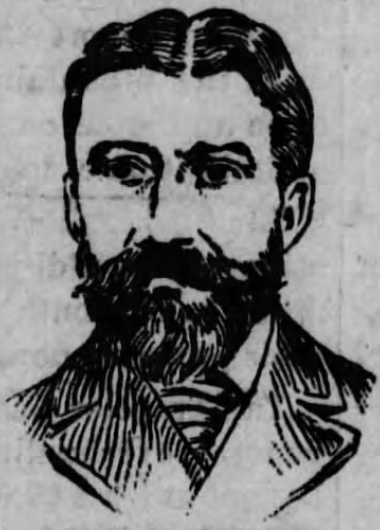

Biographical details
- Born: October 11, 1855; Boston, Massachusetts, U.S.
- Died: May 2, 1917 (aged 61); Boston, Massachusetts, U.S.

Coaching career (HC unless noted)
- 1892–1895: Harvard (assistant)
- 1895: Harvard

Head coaching record
- Overall: 1–1–1
- Known for: "Flying wedge" formation
- Spouse: Margaret Deland (m. 1880)

Lorin Fuller Deland (October 11, 1855 – May 2, 1917) was an American college football coach and theater manager. He was the head coach of the Harvard Crimson football team for three games in 1895, after having been a football "adviser" to the team beginning in 1892. He invented the "flying wedge" formation, which was unveiled in a 6–0 loss to Yale in the championship game of 1892. Later, Deland collaborated with former Yale Bulldogs football coach Walter Camp on the seminal book titled Football, published in 1896.

== Background ==
Deland was born on October 11, 1855, and grew up in Boston's South End. He graduated from The English High School in 1872 and upset his family by rejecting an opportunity to attend Harvard College in order to become an actor. He performed for the Boston Museum company until 1877, when he co-founded the Park Dramatic Club. During his acting career, Deland worked for his father’s publishing business, which he took over following his father’s death.

On May 12, 1880, he married Margaret Deland, who later gained fame as a novelist, short story writer, and poet. Deland sold father's publishing company in 1886 to go into advertising, as well as opening a greeting card business. Margaret's writing career began by authoring verses for her husband's greeting cards. The Delands had no children, but opened their home to unwed mothers. Deland was raised Unitarian but later joined the Episcopalian Trinity Church due to his admiration of Phillips Brooks. By 1892, Deland was working as a business consultant with around 15 clients.

== Football and the flying wedge ==
Deland never played football or even attended a football game until 1891, when he attended the Harvard–Yale game in Springfield. Deland, who studied military strategy as a hobby, saw similarities between the sport and war. He analyzed football as if it were a battlefield and devised plays based on his study of Napoleon Bonaparte and military tactics. Once he was convinced he had plays that could be used on the field he presented them to Captain Bernard Trafford, Everett J. Lake, and some other members of the Harvard football team, who used them during the 1892 season. Deland's biggest innovation was the latest and greatest of the mass-momentum plays, the fabled "flying wedge." He theorized that the key to the sport was to catapult all one's strength at the enemy's weakest point. He worked with the Harvard team on a voluntary basis to perfect the flying wedge, a violent assault by several men on a single opponent.

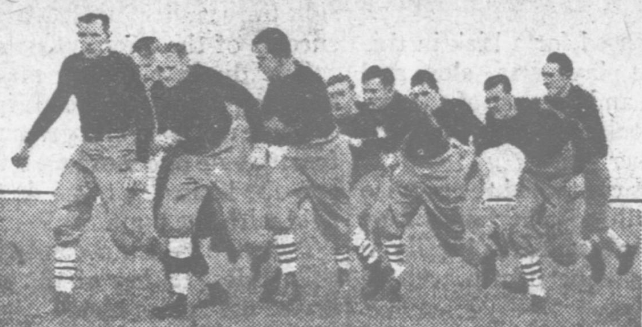
Players demonstrate Deland's "flying wedge" in 1912

Walter Camp's confidante Theodore S. Woolsey reported to Camp in July 1892 that Lorin Deland was adapting "military strategy to football" and "testing the practicability of these new plays." Yet, Woolsey questioned whether Harvard players could carry them out. He noted: "To work them out at all would require a standard of team play which Harvard is not usually up to.

Harvard's 1892 team had an undefeated 10-0 record heading into its end-of-year showdown with the Yale Bulldogs, coached by football pioneer Walter Camp. Though the team had been working on the flying wedge formation since the pre-season, Deland was saving its unveiling for the Yale game. Against Yale in 1892, Harvard opened the second half with a kickoff, but in those days it was legal to tap the ball and then put it in play by running with it or handing or pitching to a teammate. Using this strategy, Harvard implemented their devastating new play. According to football historian Parke H. Davis:

Deland divided Harvard's players into two groups of five men each at opposite sidelines. Before the ball was even in play team captain Bernie Trafford signaled the two groups. Each unit sprang forward, at first striding in unison, then sprinting obliquely toward the center of the field. Simultaneously, spectators leapt to their feet gasping. Restricted by the rules, Yale's front line nervously held its position. After amassing twenty yards at full velocity, the "flyers" fused at mid-field, forming a massive human arrow. Just then, Trafford pitched the ball back to his speedy halfback, Charlie Brewer. At that moment, one group of players executed a quarter turn, focusing the entire wedge toward Yale's right flank. Now both sides of the flying wedge pierced ahead at breakneck speed, attacking Yale's front line with great momentum. Brewer scampered behind the punishing wall, while Yale's brave defenders threw themselves into its dreadful path.

Despite the effectiveness of the flying wedge, Yale won the game 6-0.

In 1894, Deland, William A. Brooks, and Robert Bacon took over coaching duties following the death of George A. Stewart, with Brooks serving as the head coach. Brooks was unable to coach the team in 1895 and Harvard did not have a head coach until Robert Emmons took over on October 21, 1895. Deland assisted Emmons, supervising the Crimson offense. On November 3, the day after the Crimson lost 12-4 to Princeton, the coaching staff met and elected Deland as its new head coach. Deland led the team to a 4–0 win over the Michigan Wolverines, a 0–0 tie with the Boston Athletic Association, and a 17–14 loss to Penn, the closest game the undefeated Quakers played all year. Deland was credited with improving the team’s performance and Captain Edgar Wrightington secured Deland’s services for 1896. However, on April 4, 1896, Deland resigned as head coach, citing business pressure.

Deland and Yale coach Walter Camp collaborated in 1896 to write their comprehensive study of the sport, titled simply Football. The diagrammed plays in the book were drawn by Deland's wife.

== Later life ==
From 1904 to 1907, Deland managed the Castle Square Theatre with Winthrop Ames. He was diagnosed with cancer in 1911, but continued to work, forming the Wage-Earners Theater League that same year. Deland died on May 2, 1917, at age 62 at his apartment in Boston.

== Publications ==
- Football, by Walter Camp and Lorin F. Deland. Published by Houghton Mifflin, Boston, 1896
- Imagination in Business, Published by Harper & Brothers, 1909
- At the Sign of the Dollar and Other Essays, Published by Harper & Brothers, New York, 1917
- The Musical Record: A Journal of Music-Art-Literature, Number 415, August 1896 (edited by Deland), published by Oliver Ditson Co., Boston, 1896
- "The Lawrence Strike: A Study", The Atlantic Monthly, May 1912
- "Football at Harvard and at Yale", The Atlantic Monthly, November 1910, pp. 700-713
