= Alexander Smith Cochran =

American manufacturer, sportsman, and philanthropist (1874-1929)

Alexander Smith Cochran (February 28, 1874 – June 20, 1929) was a manufacturer, sportsman and philanthropist from Yonkers, New York.

== Biography ==
He was born on February 28, 1874, to William Francis Cochran and Eva Smith. His grandfather was Alexander Smith, founder of the Alexander Smith Carpet Company.

Cochran inherited his money from his parents and his maternal uncle Warren B. Smith who left Cochran the bulk of an estate estimated to be worth $40 million in 1902. Cochran was the inheritor and principal owner of Alexander Smith & Sons Carpet mills of Yonkers, which by 1929 was the largest carpet manufacturer in the world.

Cochran's properties included Glen Eyrie, in Colorado Springs.

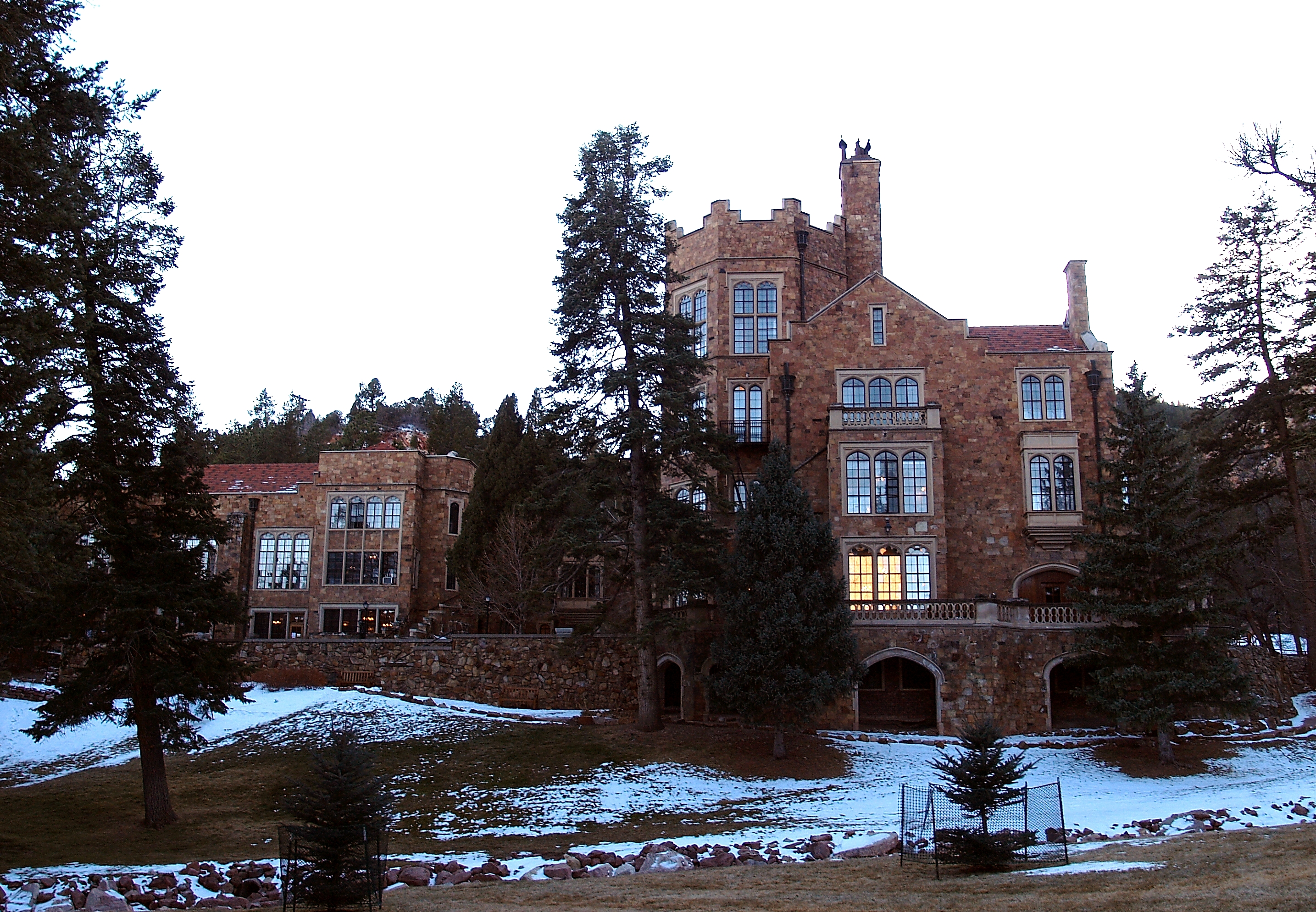
Glen Eyrie in Colorado Springs, Colorado, is now open to the public.

Cochran graduated from Yale University in 1896; in 1911, he founded, with aid from William Lyon Phelps, the university's Elizabethan Club. Cochran bought the clubhouse on College Street, provided the club with an endowment of $100,000 and donated a substantial collection of rare Elizabethan and Jacobean books. These include the four folios of Shakespeare, the 40 quartos acquired from the Huth Collection, the finest of the four known copies of "Venus and Adonis," and the unique copy of The Quenes Maiesties Passage, describing Queen Elizabeth I's first progress the day before her coronation. Cochran, who maintained contact with the club, occasionally made up shortfalls in the operating costs to prevent a member fee from being instituted. Yale's Sterling Memorial Library has exhibited papers and other material highlighting Cochran's philanthropy. The books are gifted to Yale students rather than Yale University, he is noted to have said, regarding the establishment and gifts to the Elizabethan Club.

Cochran was inspired to collect rare first edition books by Phelps. Cochran donated an endowment and his collection of illuminated manuscripts of Persian poetry to the Department of Islamic Art of the Metropolitan Museum of Art in 1913. In 1907, he accompanied his friend the scholar Abraham Valentine Williams Jackson to Iran. This may have inspired Cochran's collecting; Jackson published a scholarly catalogue on these works in 1913.

Cochran was a member of the New York Yacht Club. Initially not an enthusiastic yachtsman, he owned and raced the sloop Avenger in 1909 and won the Astor Cup. Cochran decided to build a schooner that could make the Atlantic crossing and compete well in Europe, and ordered the Westward built between 1909 and 1910 by Nathanael Herreshoff of the Herreschoff Manufacturing Company of Rhode Island. The Westward was a 96-foot-waterline steel schooner and was the largest sailboat the Herreshoff Company had made at the time. Cochran raced the yacht off England and Europe in 1910 with Charlie Barr as the skipper.

The season was a stunning success. Westward won every race in German waters and eight of nine in England. Cochran sold Westward to a German syndicate in 1911, having become interested in larger yachts. He was already having a large three-masted schooner Sett Call designed for him by William Gardner. Cochran decided to become an America's Cup contender and asked Gardner to also work on an America's Cup prospect for him. Vanitie was the result. Both Vanitie and Sett Call were built by the George Lawley and Sons Corporation of Boston.

In 1914, Cochran competed in his yacht Vanitie to be selected to defend the America's Cup against Sir Thomas Lipton's yacht. Vanitie lost to Resolute in the 1914 trials but was able to try again in 1920, because the defense of the cup was put off during World War I. The 1920 campaign was not successful; Vanitie lost 7–4 in the final selection series.

Cochran became known as the "richest bachelor in New York," from press coverage of his marriage to the actress and singer Ganna Walska. Cochran met Walska in 1919, married her in Paris and briefly lived with her in his Murray Hill home. In 1920, divorce proceedings were started. The proceedings were completed with a settlement that amounted to $US3 million, a substantial sum in 1920.

Cochran died in 1929, aged 55.
