= 1914 Grand National =

English steeplechase horse race

- Grand National
- Location: Aintree
- Date: 27 March 1914
- Winning horse: Sunloch
- Starting price: 100/6
- Jockey: W J Smith
- Trainer: Tom Tyler
- Owner: Tom Tyler
- Conditions: Good

The 1914 Grand National was the 76th renewal of the Grand National horse race that took place at Aintree near Liverpool, England, on 27 March 1914.

== Finishing Order ==
Position	Name	Jockey	Age	Handicap (st-lb)	SP	Distance
01	Sunloch	W J Smith	8	9-7	100/6	8 Lengths
02	Trianon III	Charles Hawkins	9	11-9	100/8	8 Lengths
03	Lutteur III	Alec Carter	10	12-6	10/1	
04	Rory O'Moore	Percy Whitaker	13	11-8	20/1	
?	Covertcoat	Percy Woodland	8	12-7	7/1	
?	Couvrefeu III	Jack Anthony	10	11-7	20/1	

== Non-finishers ==
Fence	Name	Jockey	Age	Handicap (st-lb)	SP	Fate
?	Great Cross	Owen Anthony	9	11-0	?	Pulled Up
?	Bahadur	Mr RH Hall	11	9-7	33/1	?
?	Ballyhackle	Mr H Usher	11	12-0	100/7	Fell
?	Another Delight	G Brown	10	11-7	33/1	Fell
?	Bloodstone	Frank Lyall	12	11-7	100/6	Ran Out
?	Jacobus	Ernest Piggott	7	11-2	100/6	Fell
?	Regent	Jack Tyrrwhitt-Drake	9	11-12	33/1	Brought Down
?	Ilston	Ivor Anthony	6	11-12	10/1	Fell
?	Thowl Pin	Isaac Morgan	9	10-10	33/1	Fell
?	All Gold II	Captain Stokes	?	10-7	?	Fell
?	Dutch Pennant	Parnham	8	10-5	?	Fell
?	Blow Pipe	Henry Bletsoe	9	10-3	25/1	Fell
?	Fetlar's Pride	D Dale	13	10-2	?	Refused
?	Diplomatist II	Mr N B Davis	9	9-7	?	Ran Out
