= George M. Pynchon =

American yacht racer

George Mallory Pynchon, Sr. (November 16, 1862 – March 9, 1940) was the winner of the 1909 King's Cup and the 1912 New York Yacht Club's Glen Cove Cup with his yacht Istalena.
