= Resolute (yacht) =

Contender in the 1920 America's Cup

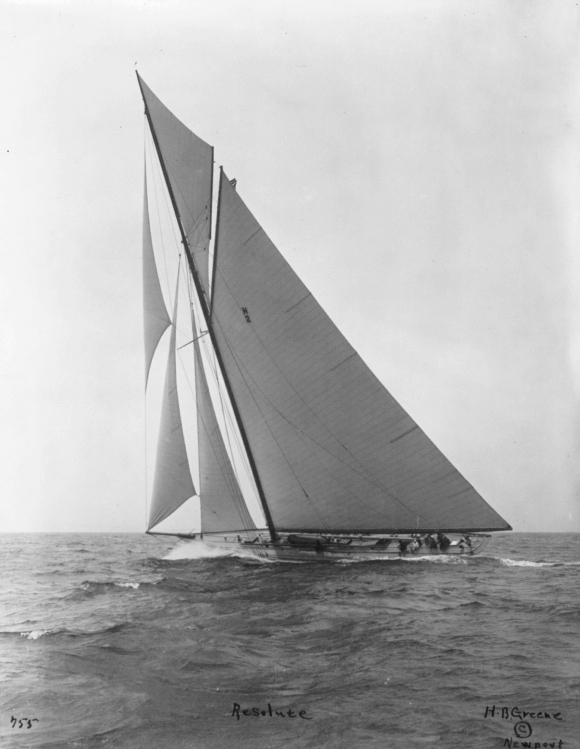
- Resolute circa 1914
- Yacht club: New York Yacht Club
- Nation: United States
- Designer(s): Nathanael Greene Herreshoff
- Builder: Herreshoff Manufacturing Company
- Launched: 1914
- Owner(s): Henry Walters syndicate E. Walter Clark (1925–)

Racing career
- Skippers: Charles Francis Adams III
- Notable victories: 1914 defender trials 1920 America's Cup
- America's Cup: 1920

Specifications
- Type: Monohull
- Displacement: 105.5 short tons (95.7 t)
- Length: 106 ft (32 m) (LOA); 75 ft (23 m) (LWL)
- Beam: 21 ft (6.4 m)
- Draft: 13 ft 9 in (4.19 m)
- Sail area: 8,650 sq ft (804 m^{2})

Resolute was a yacht designed and built by Nathanael Greene Herreshoff for a syndicate of New York Yacht Club members headed by Henry Walters to contend the 1914 America's Cup.

== Design ==
Resolute was the last Cup defender to be designed by Herreshoff.

- Overhang forward - 16 feet (4.9 m)
- Overhang aft - 15 feet (4.6 m)
- Fore triangle base - 48 feet 4 inches (14.73 m)
- Boom - 78 feet (24 m)
- Deck to topmast - 130 feet (40 m)
- Lead - 65tons

== History ==
Resolute was christened by Grace Vanderbilt and launched on April 25, 1914. In the 1914 America's Cup defender selection trials, skippered by Charles Francis Adams III, she beat Vanitie and Defiance. In so doing, she beat the America's Cup course record off Sandy Hook by sailing 30 miles in 3:16:41. However, the outbreak of World War I caused the America's Cup races for 1914 to be postponed. The race was finally held during the 1920 America's Cup.

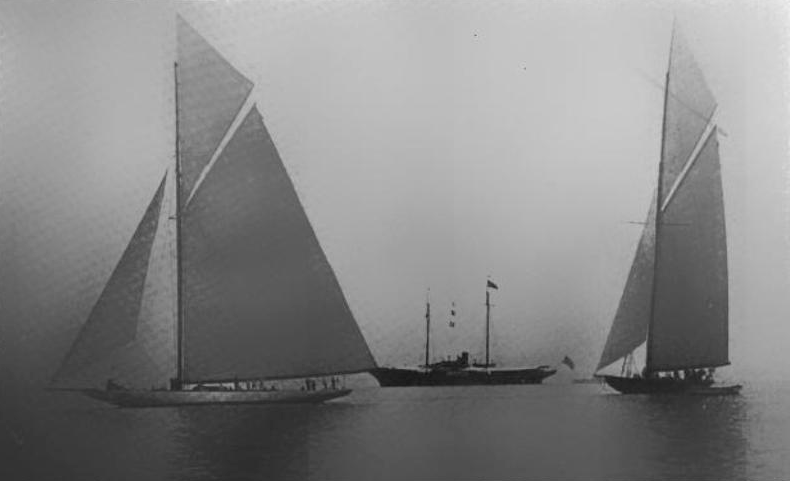
Resolute leading Vanitie at start of first elimination race off New Haven 1920.

In 1920 the America's Cup was reconvened and Resolute again prevailed in selection races before successfully defending the Cup in July, once more with Adams at the helm. Resolute lost the first two matches before recovering to defend the cup 3–2 against Shamrock IV. Robert Wales Emmons, Jr. was the manager of the yacht in 1920.

In 1925 Resolute was sold to E. Walter Clark of Philadelphia. Her racing career lasted another ten years, and in 1930 Resolute again participated in the America's cup selection races, albeit as a "trial horse" against which the potential defenders could be judged.

Robert F Kennedy named his Wianno Senior Resolute in 1964, after the America's Cup yacht.
