= 1914 Currie Cup =

Domestic rugby union competition

- Countries: South Africa
- Champions: Western Province (9th title)

The 1914 Currie Cup was the 11th edition of the Currie Cup, the premier domestic rugby union competition in South Africa.

The tournament was won by Western Province for the ninth time, who won all nine of their matches in the competition.

== See also ==
- Currie Cup
