= Robert Emmons =

American football player and coach (1872–1928)

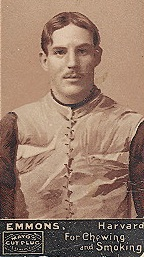
- 1894 Mayo tobacco card

Profile
- Position: End

Personal information
- Born: December 28, 1872; Boston, Massachusetts, U.S.
- Died: April 18, 1928 (aged 55); Buzzards Bay, Massachusetts, U.S.

Career history

Playing
- 1891–1894: Harvard

Coaching
- 1895: Harvard

Awards and highlights
- Coaching record: 1–1

Other information
- Military career
- Allegiance: United States
- Branch: U.S. Navy
- Service years: 1918–1919
- Rank: Lt. Commander
- Conflicts: World War I

Robert Wales Emmons II (December 28, 1872 – April 18, 1928) was an American football player, coach, yachtsman, and millionaire. He played and coached college football for Harvard University from 1891 to 1895. He later had a successful career in the banking and stock brokerage business. He was an avid yachtsman who was the managing owner of the Resolute in its successful defense of the America's Cup in 1920.

== Early life ==
Emmons was born in Boston, Massachusetts, in 1872. He was the son of Nathaniel H. Emmons and Eleanor G. (Bacon) Emmons. He attended preparatory school at Groton School.

== Harvard ==
Emmons enrolled at Harvard University where he played college football as an end for the Harvard Crimson football team from 1891 to 1894. He was elected by his teammates to serve as captain of the 1894 Harvard football team. He was president of his class at Harvard as a junior, and The New York Times wrote that "[h]is popularity depends mostly upon the great enthusiasm with which he has clung to football at Harvard during four steady years of defeat." He graduated from Harvard in 1895 but returned on October 21, 1895, as the Harvard Crimson football team's head coach. He was replaced by Lorin F. Deland following a 12–4 loss to Princeton.

== Business career and family ==
After leaving Harvard, Emmons became the treasurer of the Lawrence Gaslight Co., and a banker and bondsman associated with the firm of F.A. Schirmer & Co. in Boston. At the time of the 1900 United States census, Emmons was living in Boston with his wife, Helen, and their son, Robert W. Emmons III. His occupation was listed at that time as a stock broker. At the time of the 1930 United States census, Emmons continued to live in both with his wife, Helen. At that time, they had two sons, Robert W. Emmons 3rd and Gardner Emmons. They also had five live-in servants, and Emmons' occupation was listed as a stock broker. In 1920, he was still living in Boston with his wife and two sons; he was listed as being employed in the shipping business.

In 1917, Emmons purchased the Eastern League baseball team in Lynn, Massachusetts, which he moved to Lawrence, Massachusetts.

== U.S. Navy ==
He served in the United States Navy during World War I, had the rank of lieutenant commander, and was assigned to organize the Naval Overseas Transport Service.

== Yachtsman ==
He was an active yachtsman for many years. His accomplishments as a yachtsman include service as skipper and managing owner of the Resolute in its successful defense of the America's Cup in 1920. By 1913, Emmons was already a well-known yachtsman. At that time, J. P. Morgan and Cornelius Vanderbilt III asked Emmons to oversee the defense of the America's Cup set for 1914. Emmons became part of the syndicate with Morgan and Vanderbilt that built and owned the Resolute. Emmons monitored the construction of the Resolute at Nathanael Greene Herreshoff's boatyard in the winter and spring of 1913 to 1914. Emmons and Charles Francis Adams III led the Resolute in its 1914 defense of the America's Cup, but the competition was terminated upon the outbreak of World War I.

== Death ==
Emmons died at his summer home at Buzzards Bay, Massachusetts, in April 1928.

== Head coaching record ==
Year	Team	Overall	Conference	Standing	Bowl/playoffs
Harvard Crimson (Independent) (1895)
1895	Harvard	1–1			
Harvard:		1–1			
Total:		1–1			
