= 1920 America's Cup =

13th America's Cup
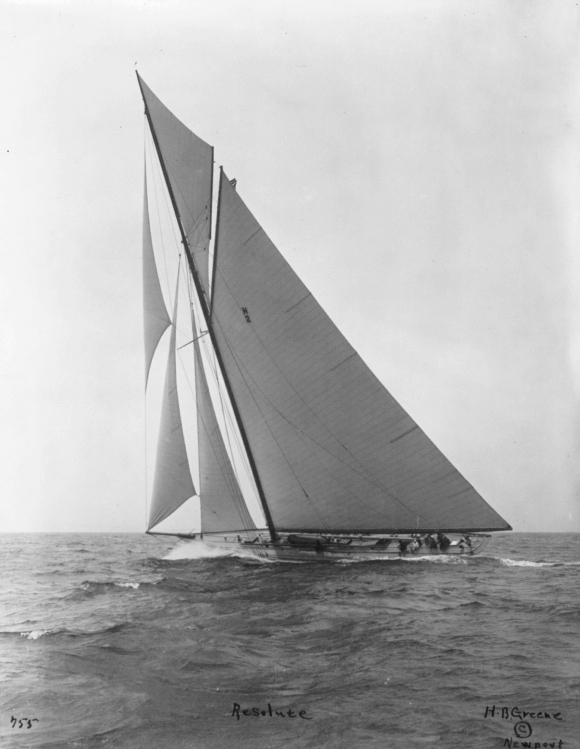
- NYYC's defending yacht, Resolute

Defender United States
- Defender club: New York Yacht Club
- Yacht: Resolute

Challenger United Kingdom
- Challenger club: Royal Ulster Yacht Club
- Yacht: Shamrock IV

Competition
- Location: New York Harbor
- 40°40′N 74°02′W
- Dates: 1901
- Rule: Universal Rule
- Winner: New York Yacht Club
- Score: 3–2

The 1920 America's Cup was the 13th challenge for the Cup and the first since 1903. It took place in New York Harbor and consisted of a best-of-five series of races between the defender Resolute, entered by a syndicate of New York Yacht Club members headed by Henry Walters, and Shamrock IV, the fourth in Sir Thomas Lipton's line of Cup challengers. Charles Francis Adams III was the skipper of Resolute in this race.

Despite being disabled in the first race and losing the second, Resolute won the final three races and in doing so retained the Cup on behalf of the NYYC, continuing the club's unbroken record of defending the America's Cup.

The 1920 America's Cup was originally scheduled to take place in 1914 but was postponed upon the outbreak of World War I.

The 13th Cup challenge was the last to take place in New York, and the first held under the Universal Rule of measurement. Due to the rule, Shamrock IV owed Resolute seven minutes time.

== Lipton challenges a fourth time ==
Following his unsuccessful Cup challenge in 1903, Lipton, founder of the Lipton tea company, attempted to persuade the NYYC to adopt new rules of measurement for America's Cup yachts that would reduce their cost, which was widely seen to be a result of the Seawanhaka rule then used by the club. Despite the NYYC having adopted the new Universal Rule in 1903, formulated by Nathaniel Herreshoff, for its own races, it was reluctant to allow its use for America's Cup races and refused several challenges issued by Lipton until finally accepting in 1913.

== Trials ==
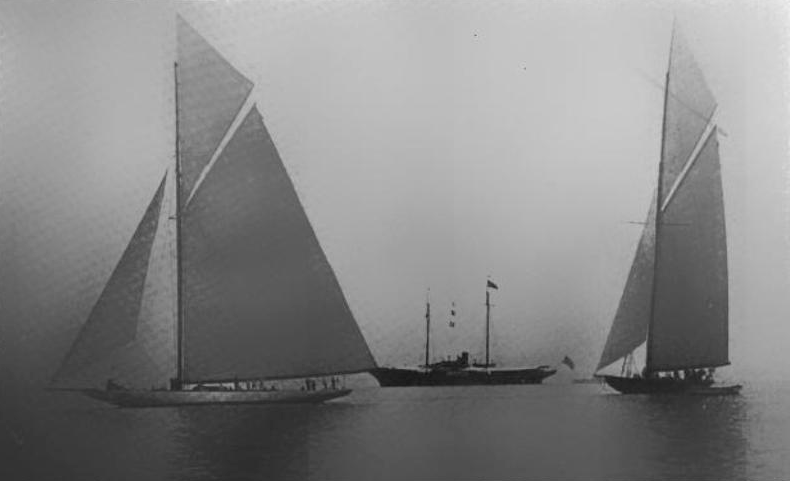
Resolute leading Vanitie at start of first elimination race off New Haven 1920.

The 1914 defender selection trials pitted Resolute against Vanitie. In winning, Resolute set a course record. The races were suspended as World War I broke out and did not resume until 1920, at which point Resolute again secured her place as defender in trials against Vanitie.

== Race ==
The American defender Resolute won 3–2 against the challenger Shamrock IV.

During the first race, Shamrock IV crossed the line ahead of the start, having to circle back around and provide an early lead to Resolute. However, later in the race the shackle holding Resolute's mainsail broke, forcing the boat to complete the race only under jib. This provided Lipton with his first America's Cup victory, although he refused to celebrate the win.

The second race was without incident and Shamrock IV won by a corrected two minutes ahead of Resolute.

The following three races were under lighter conditions, which disadvantaged Shamrock IV and allowed Resolute to win. Police estimated that over 75,000 people watched the final race.

The course for the race was laid out by Lewis Blix.
