= Shamrock IV =

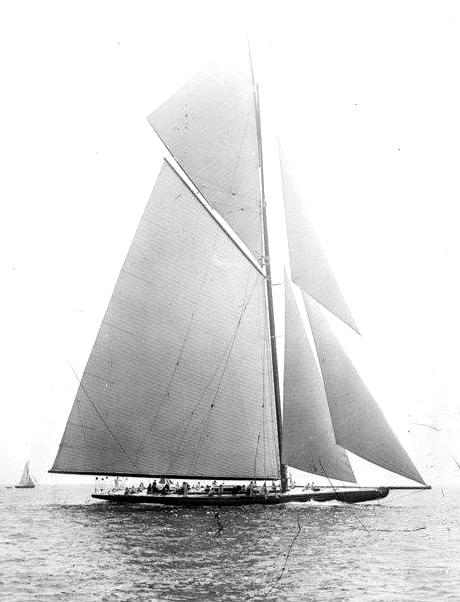
- Shamrock IV
- Yacht club: Royal Ulster Yacht Club
- Nation: United Kingdom
- Designer(s): Charles Ernest Nicholson
- Launched: 26 May 1914
- Owner(s): Sir Thomas Lipton
- Fate: Broken up 1932

Racing career
- Skippers: William P. Burton
- America's Cup: 1920

Specifications
- Displacement: 108.3 tonnes
- Length: 33.63 m (110.3 ft) (LOA); 22.86 m (75.0 ft) (LWL)
- Beam: 6.35 m (20.8 ft)
- Draft: 4.16 m (13.6 ft)
- Sail area: 971.70 m^{2} (10,459.3 sq ft)

Shamrock IV was a yacht owned by Sir Thomas Lipton and designed by Charles Ernest Nicholson. She was the unsuccessful challenger in the 1920 America's Cup. While the boat was launched in 1914, and soon towed across the Atlantic by Lipton's boat Erin, she was soon dry docked due to World War I. Shamrock IV was known as the 'ugly duckling' due to its scow-like bow.

The boat was considerably faster than the defender, Resolute, and owed seven minutes under the newly instated Universal rule.

While Shamrock IV lost the America's Cup, it was a public sensation. Lipton allowed tours after the last race, and reportedly 35,000 people walked aboard during a three-day period.

== See also ==
- Shamrock, 1898 yacht
