= Vanitie =

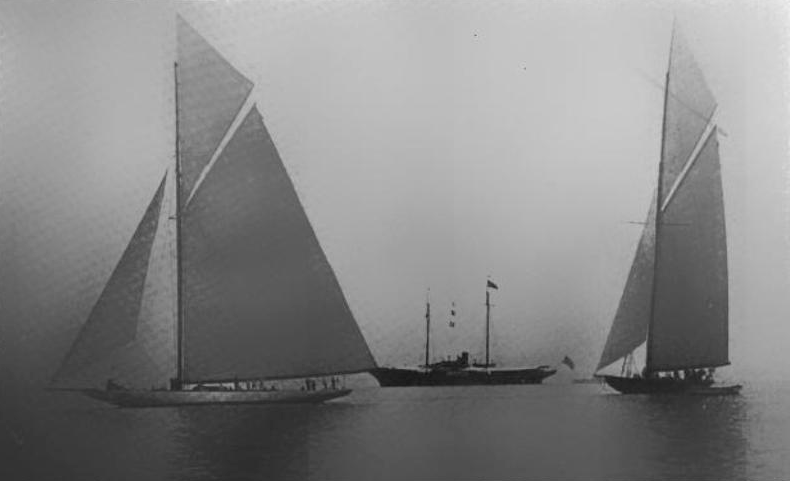
- Resolute leading Vanitie at start of first elimination race off New Haven 1920.
- Owner(s): Alexander Smith Cochran

Racing career
- AC Challenger Selection Series: 1914 America's Cup Challenger Selections Series; 1920 America's Cup Challenger Selections Series

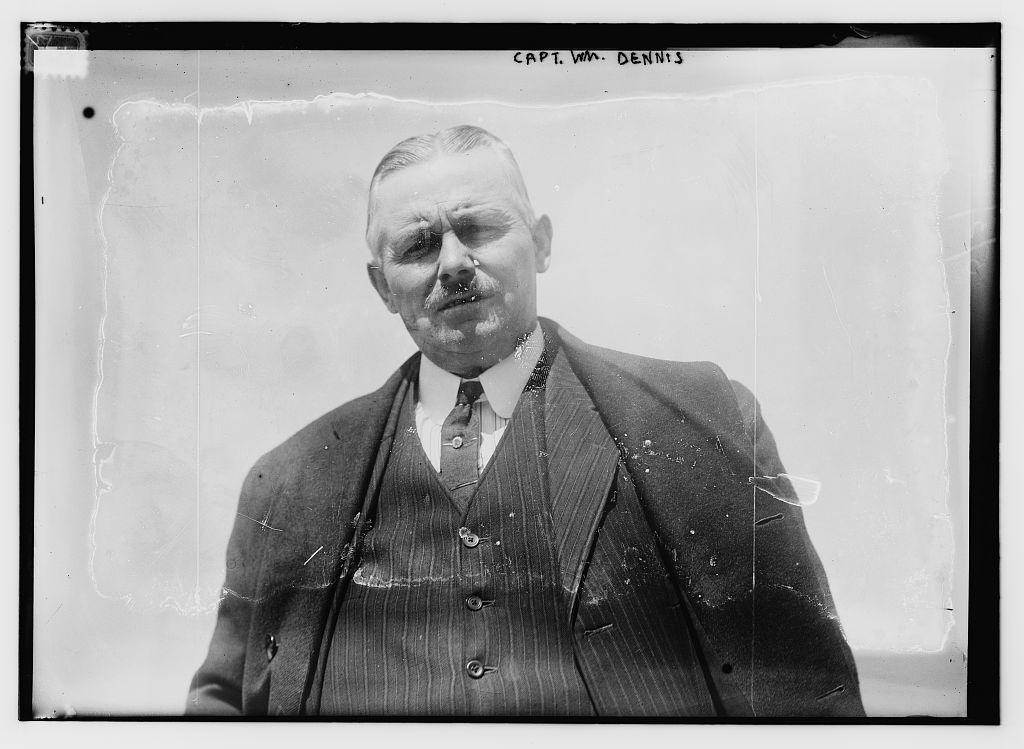
William S. Dennis captain of the Vanitie in 1914

Vanitie was a yacht owned by Alexander Smith Cochran that was selected to take part in selection trials for the America's Cup in 1914 against Sir Thomas Lipton's yacht Shamrock IV.

== History ==
On June 17, 1914 William S. Dennis was replaced by Harry Haff, son of Hank Haff as the captain of the yacht. Vanitie lost to Resolute in the 1914 trials. Defense of the cup was put off during World War I. The 1920 campaign was not successful and Vanitie lost 7–4 in the final selection series, again against Resolute which went on to successfully defend the America's Cup on behalf of the New York Yacht Club.
