= Frank Murdoch =

British sailor

- Born: 21 February 1904; Antwerp
- Died: 13 June 1996 (aged 92); Nyon, Switzerland
- Occupations: aeronautical engineer, naval architect.
- Known for: Promoting necessity for British aviation rearmament capacity in the mid-1930s
- Engineering career
- Discipline: Mechanical engineering
- Institutions: University College London
- Employers: Hawker Aircraft; Guthrie, Murdoch & Co.
- Significant advance: Aviation technology to Yacht racing
- Sports career
- Full name: Frank John Murdoch
- Nationality: British
- Sport: Yacht racing
- Events: 6 Metre, America's Cup

Frank Murdoch (21 February 1904 – 13 June 1996) was a British aeronautical engineer, naval architect and competitive sailor. He played a significant role in the early production of the Hawker Hurricane.

== Early life and education ==
Murdoch was born in Antwerp to a Belgian mother and half Belgian/Scottish father. During World War I he attended secondary school in Eastbourne before returning to Antwerp. Murdoch successfully raced 6 Metre and 12 Metre yachts in Europe in the 1920s. After three consecutive victories in the Shelde Juweel, his Fife-designed 6 Metre was permanently awarded the series trophy. He studied engineering at University College London between 1928-32. While sailing in the 1930 Ramsgate to Ostend race, Murdoch met Thomas Sopwith for the first time.

== Career ==
On graduating, Murdoch joined Sopwith at his Hawker Aircraft Company. Notably when working for Sopwith, he designed for Sopwith's yacht Endeavour, the challenger for the 1934 America's Cup, the rod rigging and an electrical indicator which provided the helmsman with a precise indication of the relative wind direction, which up to now had been approximated by observing a pennant at the top of the mast. While preparing for the 1937 America's Cup challenge, Murdoch was sent on a tour of several German factories, including the MAN diesel plant in Augsburg, to find new engines for Sopwith's cruiser Philante. Murdoch realized that Hitler had impressive weapons plans underway and reported his data to Sopwith, who tried to convince the British government of the necessity to modernize the Royal Air Force. The government's initial response was an order for a dozen airplanes. In the absence of official authorisation, the Hawker Aircraft Company decided, in early 1936 to proceed with the issue of the design drawings to the production design office and to start tooling-up for a production line capable of producing a batch of 1,000 Hurricanes, at company expense. The Air Ministry placed its first order for 600 aircraft in June 1936.

== Post-war ==
After the War Murdoch worked in Belgium for his grandfather's shipbuilding firm, Guthrie, Murdoch & Co., which was known for sailing yachts from the mid-twentieth century. Murdoch was managing director until 1961. Murdoch was a crew member of Kenneth Preston's Titia in the 6 Metre event at Harmaja during the 1952 Summer Olympics.

He died at Nyon, Switzerland in 1996, the same year that he was inducted into the America's Cup Hall of Fame
