= Roderick Stephens =

American sailor

Roderick Stephens, Jr. (August 7, 1909 – January 10, 1995) was an American sailor and ship designer. In 1933 he became Associate Designer, later promoted to President, of Sparkman & Stephens naval architecture and yacht design firm, a company founded in 1929 by his brother Olin Stephens and Drake Sparkman.

== Biography ==
Born in New York City in 1909 Stephens and his family moved to Scarsdale, New York. He graduated Scarsdale High School and attended Cornell University. In 1928 Stephens left Cornell University to join the well-respected Henry Nevins boatyard in City Island, New York. He held an honorary Master of Arts postgraduate degree, awarded jointly to his brother Olin in 1958 by Brown University to "a rare team of designers of yachts, ships and amphibious vehicles."

He was a member of the Society of Naval Architects and Marine Engineers, the New York Yacht Club, the American Yacht Club, a former Commodore of the Cruising Club of America and a winner of its Blue Water Medal, a member of the Royal Ocean Racing Club (U.K.), a former Commodore of the Storm Trysail Club, a former Commodore of the Off Soundings Club—North American Station, a former Post Captain of the Royal Swedish Yacht Club, an honorary member of the United States Naval Academy Fales Committee, Chairman of the New Ship Committee of the Sea Education Association, a member of Mystic Seaport Museum, and the National Maritime Historical Society's WAVETREE Foundation.

He received the Medal of Freedom, the United States's highest civilian award, for his contributions during World War II in his design and engineering of the DUKW ("duck") military amphibious vehicle. Stephens was inducted into the National Sailing Hall of Fame in 2012.

He was the first mate aboard Dorade for her 1931 Trans-Atlantic and Fastnet Race triumphs, repeating the Fastnet victory as skipper of Dorade in 1933. In 1935 he repeated in Trans-Atlantic and Fastnet victories as the skipper of Stormy Weather. In 1937 he was in the afterguard of the J-Class Ranger for her successful defense of the America's Cup. In 1958 and 1964 he served in the afterguard of the Sparkman & Stephens designed 12-metre class yachts COLUMBIA and CONSTELLATION for two more successful defenses of the America's Cup.

He also worked as the chief inspector for S&S and he had the final word on numerous details during the construction and sea trials of more than 2,000 S&S-designed sailing and motor yachts.

A trophy is awarded annually by the Cruising Club of America in Stephens' honor. The Rod Stephens Trophy is awarded for an act of seamanship which significantly contributes to the safety of a yacht, or one or more individuals at sea.

== Bibliography ==
- "Roderick Stephens, 85, Sailor And Innovator in Yacht Design" New York Times 12 January 1995: B-11.
- "Roderick Stephens Innovator" Cruising World. Jan. 1990.
