= Dorade box =

Marine ventilation device

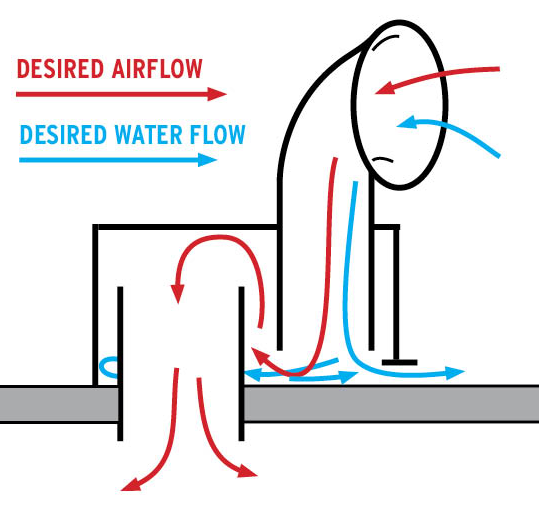
A cutaway diagram of a Dorade Box. The red arrows show the desired airflow (into the cabin) and the blue arrows show the desired water flow (out of the integral scupper onto the deck). The grey area indicates the deck of the boat.

A dorade box (also called a dorade vent, collector box, cowl vent, or simply a "ventilator") is a type of vent that permits the passage of air in and out of the cabin or engine room of a boat while keeping rain, spray, and sea wash out.

== Design ==
The basic form is a low, rectangular box fixed to the deck or cabin top, fitted with interleaving vertical baffles. The baffles alternate to be free at the floor of the box, or free at the ceiling, forming a series of chambers.

A horn-shaped ventilation cowl is usually fitted facing forward to a large hole at the top of the chamber at one end of the box with another large hole opening down into the boat from the chamber at the other end. Limber holes perforate the wall of the box at the floor of each chamber.

Dorade boxes operate on the principle that air can pass relatively freely through the chambers, yet rain or sea wash will be trapped in successive chambers and drain out of the small holes in the sides of the box.

The principle can be applied to other forms. For example, one variant has a circular layout with the baffles as concentric rings.

== Origin ==
The first appearance of Dorade boxes was on the Olin Stephens-designed Dorade, a yacht built in 1929 for ocean racing. As originally built, the Dorade's vents led directly below, but this was found to allow water below, and the vents were modified in the early 1930s.
