= Geerd Hendel =

Geerd Niels Hendel (14 January 1903 – 30 March 1998) was a naval architect and native of Germany. He found success in the United States becoming a prominent yacht designer who had a hand in an America's Cup victory in 1937.

== Life and career ==
Born in Hamburg, Hendel apprenticed for two years at Deutsche Werft shipyard in Hamburg before attending the Higher Technical Institute at Bremen where he specialized in naval architecture. Following graduation in 1925, he spent over two years in the design office of Nobiskrug shipyard in Rendsburg in Northern Germany.

Hendel came to the US in November 1928 with a visa and worked in New York City in the office of Theodore Wells, naval architect.

In 1935, Hendel became chief draftsman for the legendary naval architect Starling Burgess, who at the time was living in Wiscasset, Maine, and working on various projects for the Bath Iron Works, in Bath, Maine.

In 1936, Harold Stirling Vanderbilt engaged the Bath Iron Works to build the America's Cup Defender Ranger, the greatest of all J-class yachts. Geerd Hendel worked with Starling Burgess and a young Olin Stephens on putting together the working drawings (see Olin Stephens's book, All This and Sailing Too). From his work on Ranger’s aluminum masts, Hendel became one of the early advocates of the use of aluminum in yacht building. That summer, Hendel became a US citizen.

In 1938, Hendel designed the 21-foot fin keel sloop known as the Boothbay Harbor One Design, the culmination of almost a decade's work of designing, building, and then testing his ideas for fast racing sloops. Geerd Hendel and Starling Burgess actively raced the Hendel Racing Sloop during the years leading up to World War II.

In 1939, Hendel designed Whistler, one of the first aluminum alloy vessels ever built in the United States. It was an experimental yacht for Alcoa, built at Rice Brothers in East Boothbay, Maine. The following year he worked for Sparkman & Stephens for a short time.

Post World War II, Hendel established his own independent design firm in 1945 in Camden, Maine. He gained fame as a naval architect both in the United States and Europe for his many innovative designs of luxury yachts, fishing vessels, tugboats, launches, and sailboats. He spent well over 60 years behind the drawing board and the last 30 managing his own firm. His accomplishments were documented over the years in numerous trade magazines and books on boat building.

Most of Hendel's drawings and work are located in the Hendel Collection at the Maine Maritime Museum, 243 Washington St., Bath, ME 04530 USA.
