= Yaahting =

Boating magazine parody

Yaahting: A Parody
- Yaahting cover from 1984
- Editor-in-chief: Nathaniel Philbrick
- Executive Editor: Peter Gow
- Publisher: Elizabeth Meyer
- Founded: 1984
- Company: Dreadnaught Publishing
- Country: United States
- Based in: Massachusetts
- Language: English

Yaahting: A Parody was a 1984 parody of the boating magazine genre, most notably Yachting. It was published by Dreadnaught Publishing, a short lived Massachusetts based company. The main publishing staff were: Elizabeth Meyer, Publisher; Nathaniel Philbrick, Editor-in-chief; Peter Gow, Executive Editor; William Gotha, Design Director; and Bob Payne, Advertising Coordinator.

Yaahting consisted of a number of short pieces lampooning typical examples of nautical journalism: self-congratulatory how-to pieces, "How to Walk Down a Dock," "Restoring the Buzzards Bay 23," and "At Last--A Real Instant Boat;" fawning interviews of famous yachtsmen, "Hog Wild in Wallenda" and "Tom Blackballer Looks Ahead;" and fatuous cruising tales, "Hearth of Darkness," "Cruising the Persian Gulf," and "A Perfect Cruising World." Other features included reportage on faux race events ("The Alcatraz 100," "The Flying Squat Nationals," "Going for Broke," and "The Inquirer Singlehanded TransAt Race") and features on absurd vessels ("Soave 48HRS--The Shape of Things to Come," "Dumpster Ahoy!" and "Hiva-Oa"). A number of the articles were written as specific parodies of the style of popular writers of the era; travel writer Patience Wales was targeted as "Prudence Porpoise", and globetrotters Lin and Larry Pardey became Lint and Berry Nurdee.

Notable in the magazine were the spectacular color photographs, many set up by publisher Meyer and the products of such well-known nautical photographers as Alastair Black, Christian Fevrier, Daniel Forster, Benjamin Mendlowitz, Dan Nerney, and Neil Rabinowitz. Artwork included contributions by Jan Adkins, Don Demers, Robert Forget, and Jeremy Ross. Several famous figures in the sailing world of the 1980s served as photographic models, including Tom Blackaller and Robby Doyle.

Included are many photographs of disasters and embarrassments, outtakes from the files of maritime photographers featuring dismastings, collisions, and other examples of bad luck and questionable seamanship. Photographers were eager to find a home for these photographs, which were otherwise unpublishable in mainstream periodicals.

Yaahting also featured nearly a hundred pages of parody advertisements and short articles organized by "department."

Roughly 30,000 copies of Yaahting were produced and were sold directly by Dreadnaught as well as through bookstores and Nauticalia dealers.

== Staff ==
Publisher Elizabeth Meyer went on to restore the J-Boat Endeavour, and she is now a principal in J Class Management of Newport, Rhode Island, and of the International Yacht Restoration School. In 1987 Dreadnaught Publishing also produced The Concordia Yawls: The First Fifty Years.

Editor-in-chief Nathaniel Philbrick is a writer on maritime and historical subjects. His bestselling In the Heart of the Sea won the National Book Award in 2001. His book Mayflower (2006) was a bestseller. Executive editor Peter Gow teaches and has written on educational, historical, and maritime subjects, including a meditation on the educative power of being on the water, The Watery Realm (2006). Advertising coordinator Bob Payne is a well-known travel writer.

Yaahting was an example of the parody genre that flourished in the 1970s and '80s, inspired by other magazine send-ups produced by The Harvard Lampoon and others.
