= Velsheda =

J Class sailing yacht

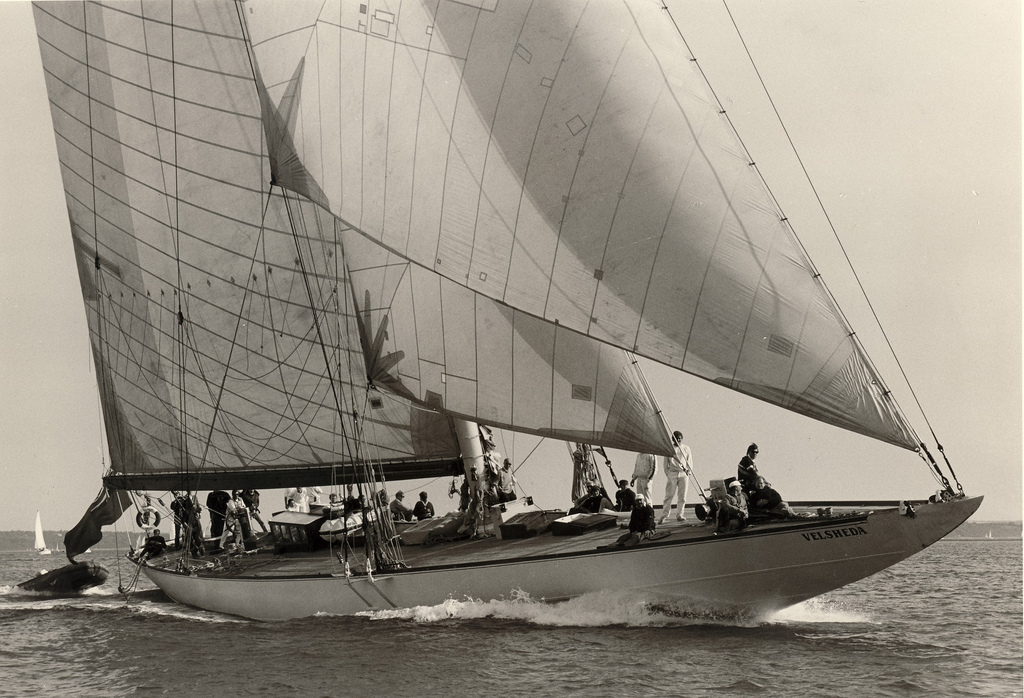
- Velsheda

History

United Kingdom
- Name: Velsheda
- Owner: 1933: William Lawrence Stephenson, RYS; 1984: Terry Brabant, 1999: Ronald de Waal, RSYC, AYC
- Port of registry: Saint Peter Port, Guernsey
- Builder: Camper & Nicholsons
- Launched: 1933
- Reinstated: November 1997

General characteristics
- Class & type: J-class yacht
- Displacement: 143 tons
- Length: 129 ft 3 in (39.40 m) (Overall); 91 ft 2 in (27.79 m) (Waterline)
- Beam: 21 ft 6 in (6.55 m)
- Draught: 15 ft (4.57 m)

The J-class yacht Velsheda was designed by Charles Ernest Nicholson and built in 1933 by Camper and Nicholsons at Gosport, Hampshire. She was built for businessman William Lawrence Stephenson and between 1933 and 1936, she won many races and competed with other yachts of her era such as Britannia, Endeavour and Shamrock V.

== History ==
=== Initial career ===
Designed by Charles Ernest Nicholson and built by Camper & Nicholsons in 1933 for Mr W.L. Stephenson, managing director of Woolworth retail shops, she was built in 1933 at Gosport. She was Nicholson's second design for a J Class and Stephenson's second big yacht. Velsheda was named after Stephenson's three daughters, Velma, Sheila and Daphne. She raced with the greatest names in classic yachting including Britannia, Endeavour and Shamrock V between 1933 and 1936.

In her second season she won more than 40 races and achieved an outstanding record of success at regattas from Southend to Dartmouth. Other venues included Torbay, Swanage and of course the Solent, all under the control of the very famous Captain Fred Mountifield. The permanent racing crew at that time was probably around 16 men and this would have been augmented to around 30 for racing. When not required for sail changes, spare crew were moved to below decks.

In her 1930s heyday, she represented the most advanced technical design for spars, rigging, sails, deck gear and ropes. Her masts were aluminium, made by bending plates and riveting them together. Sails were made from the new Terylene threads and deck gear now included winches for easier handling of sheets. The standing rigging was solid rod, even in the 1930s, but with so much stretch in the rigging and systems it was inevitable that J Class masts could not be held in column and would collapse in stronger winds. In anything above a force 3, there was serious concern about holding the rig in place without collapse.

Below decks accommodation was limited to just the main saloon, owners quarters aft, and storage for sails and equipment forward.

By 1937 she was laid up in a mud berth on the River Hamble and became derelict. Many sailors remember visiting her - one recalls sailing in the annual Warming Pan race at Hamble, and all the visiting crew being taken up the river to their overnight accommodation on Velsheda.

=== Subsequent restoration ===
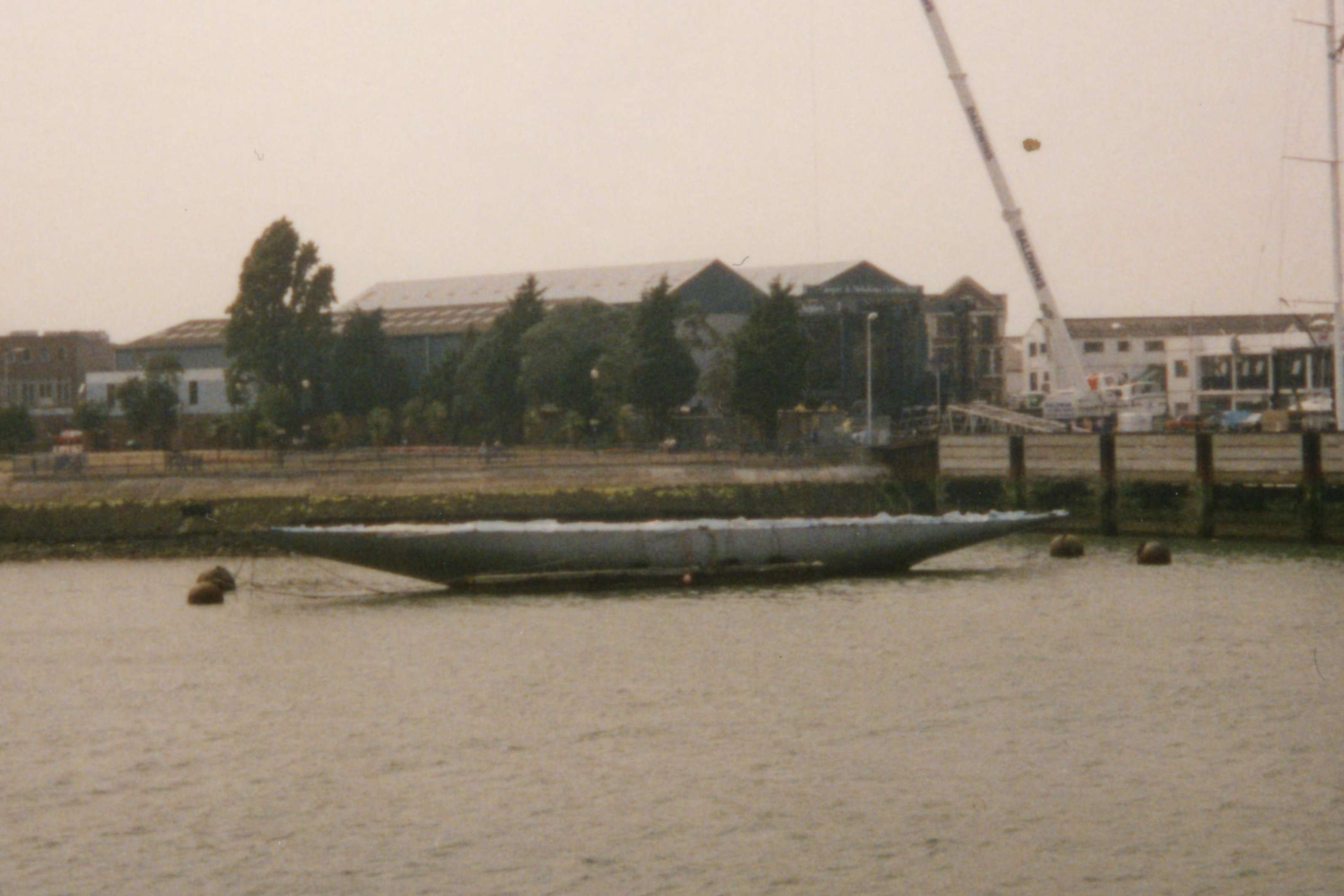
Velsheda in 1996

Velsheda was rescued from her Hamble mud berth in 1984 by Terry Brabant, who economically refitted her for charter work with a new steel mast and limited interior. Work was carried out by a traditional boat builder Christopher Peterson and a big team of workers. Still without an engine she sailed regularly along the UK south coast on charter work and occasionally ventured to the Mediterranean and Caribbean. She had a chequered career: whilst on charter during the early 1990s Velsheda visited the UK east coast where she found herself on the beach on a falling tide; fortunately she was recovered safely.

Occasionally she raced in the annual Round the Island Race and although in poor condition, she was still an impressive sight, competing the 60 mile course in quick time. She was laid up and moored at Gosport in 1995/6.

She was purchased in 1996 as a bare hull from the bankrupt C & N yard in Portsmouth Harbour. Southampton Yacht Services on the River Itchen were then commissioned to undertake a major rebuild including a new one piece carbon fibre mast and inboard diesel engine installation for the first time. She was re-launched in November 1997.

Dutch businessman Ronald de Waal (from European retail fashion chain WE, formerly HIJ/HEY/ZIJ) bought Velsheda in 1999 and has campaigned her extensively in the Maxi and classic racing circuits in the Caribbean and in the Mediterranean sea.

== Gallery ==
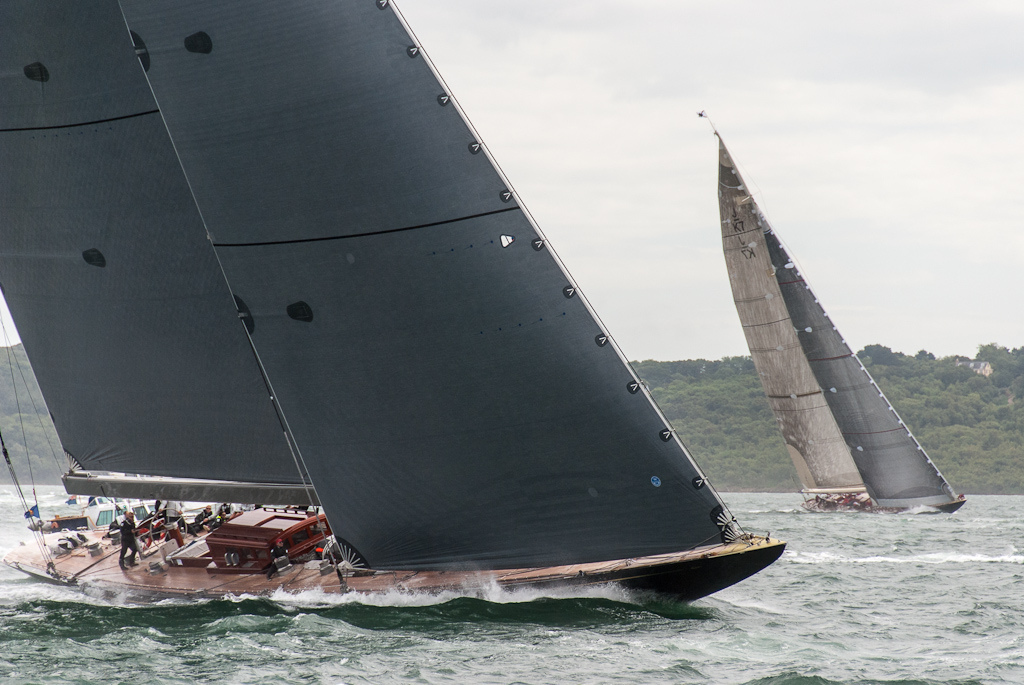
Racing against (the replica) Rainbow (foreground) in the 2012 J-Class Solent regatta

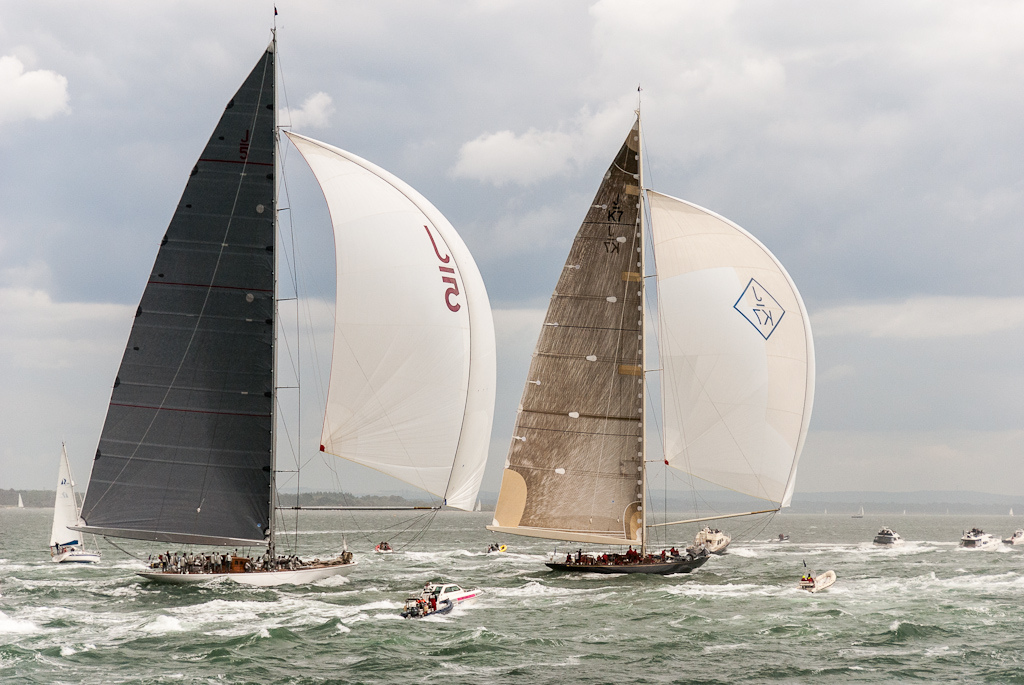
Racing under spinnaker against Ranger (left) in the 2012 J-Class Solent regatta

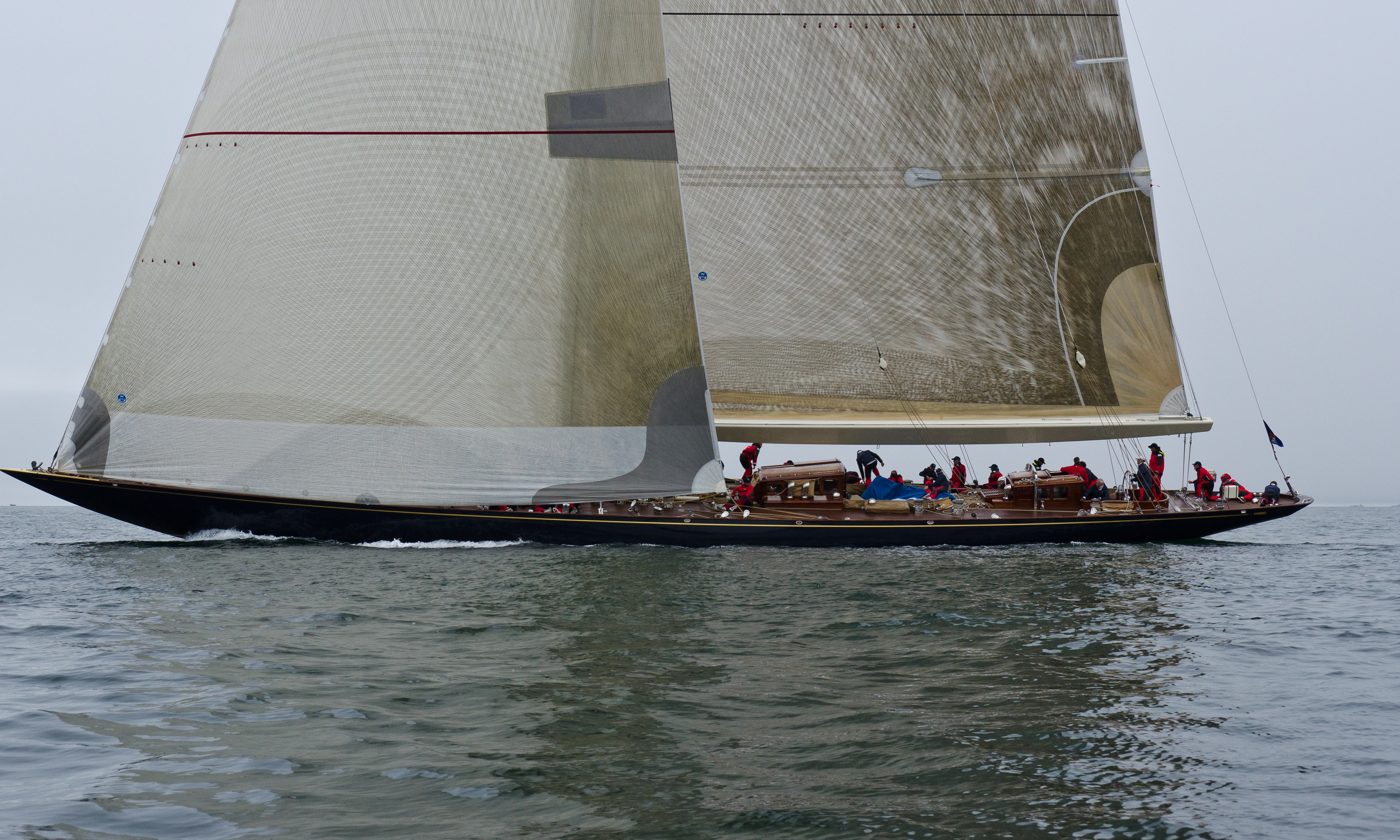
Sailing under mainsail and genoa jib

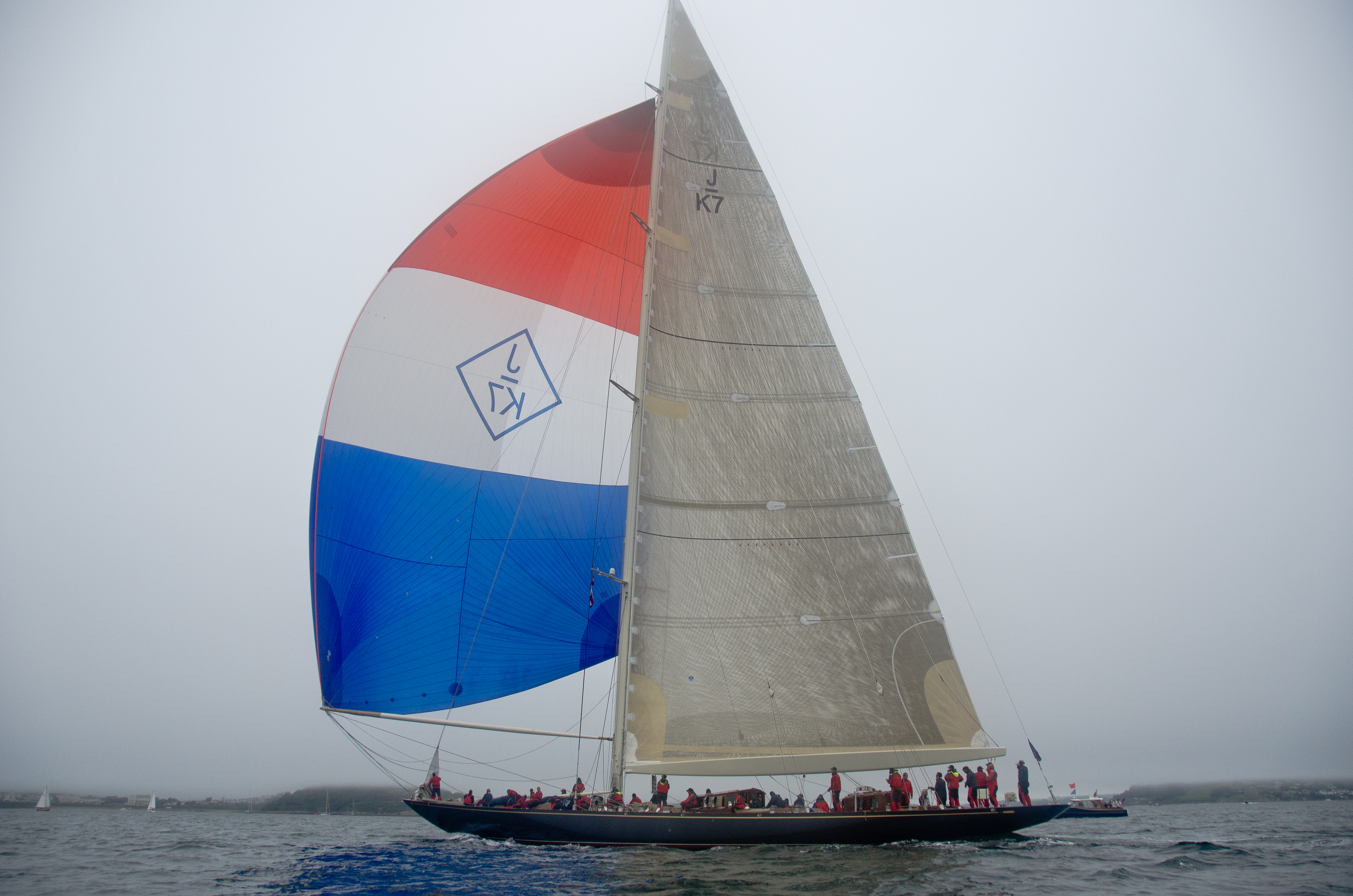
Sailing under mainsail and spinnaker

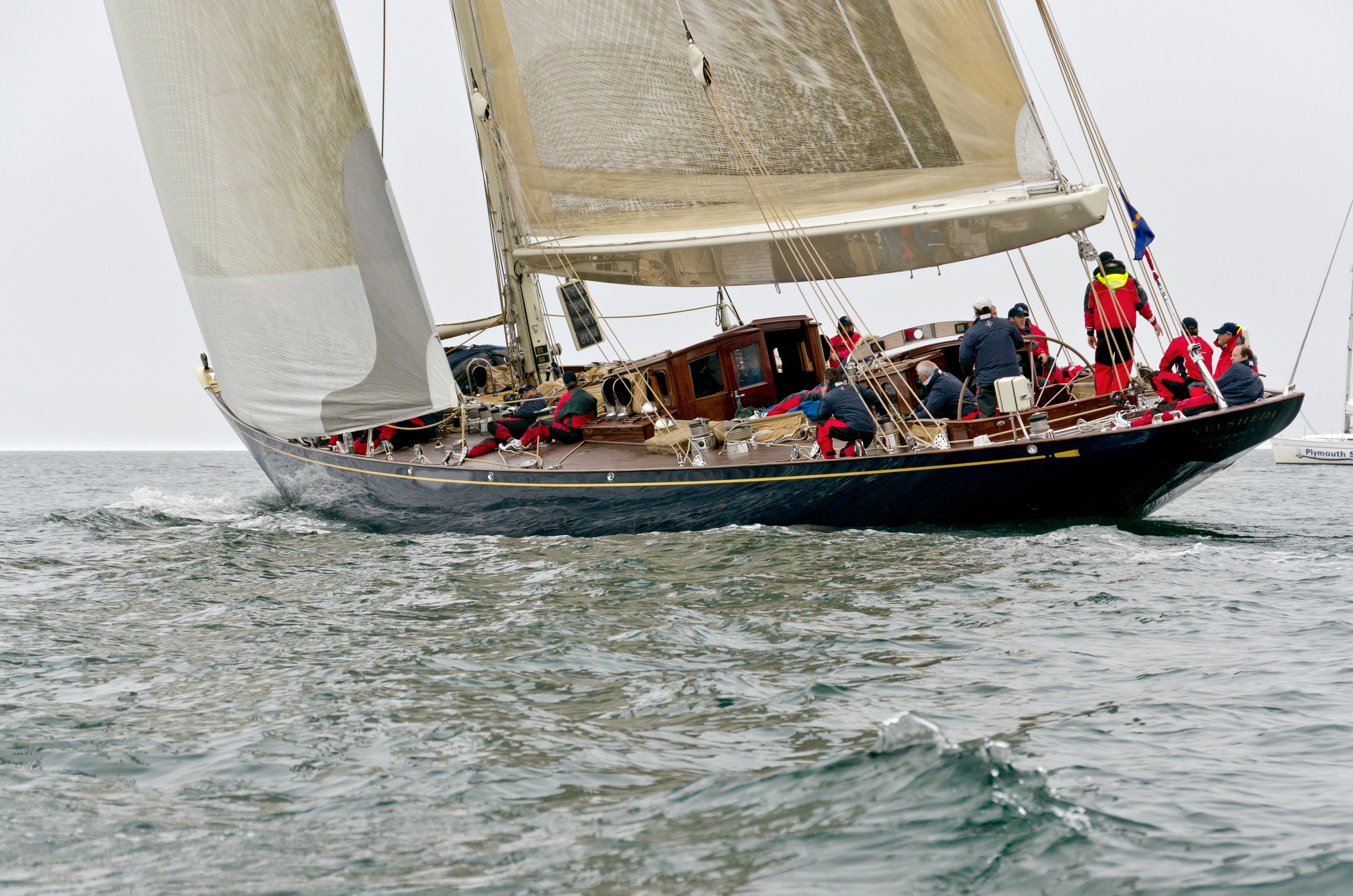
Velsheda under sail at the J-Class regatta in Falmouth, 2012

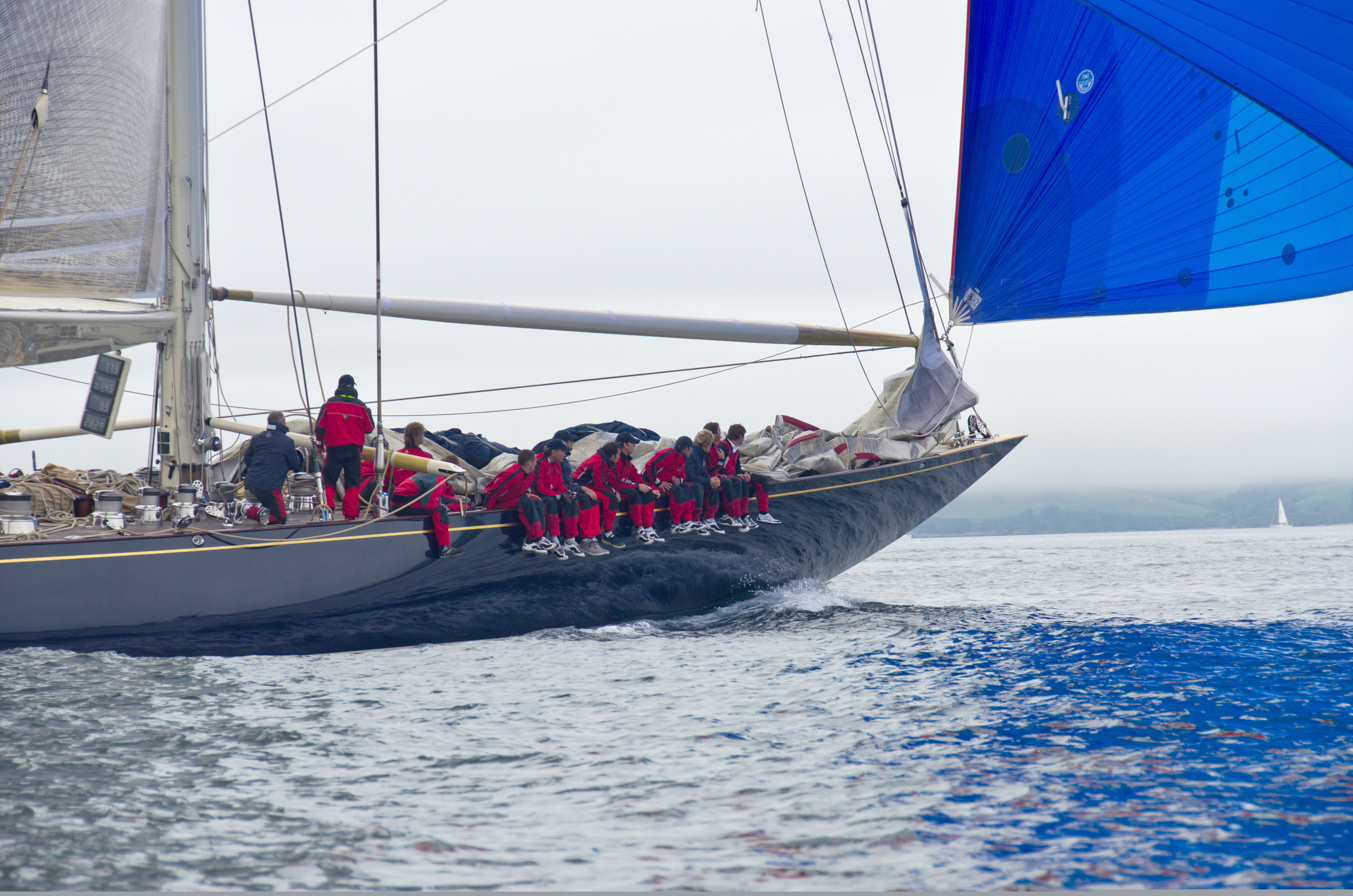
Velsheda under sail - crew are sitting on the gunwale.

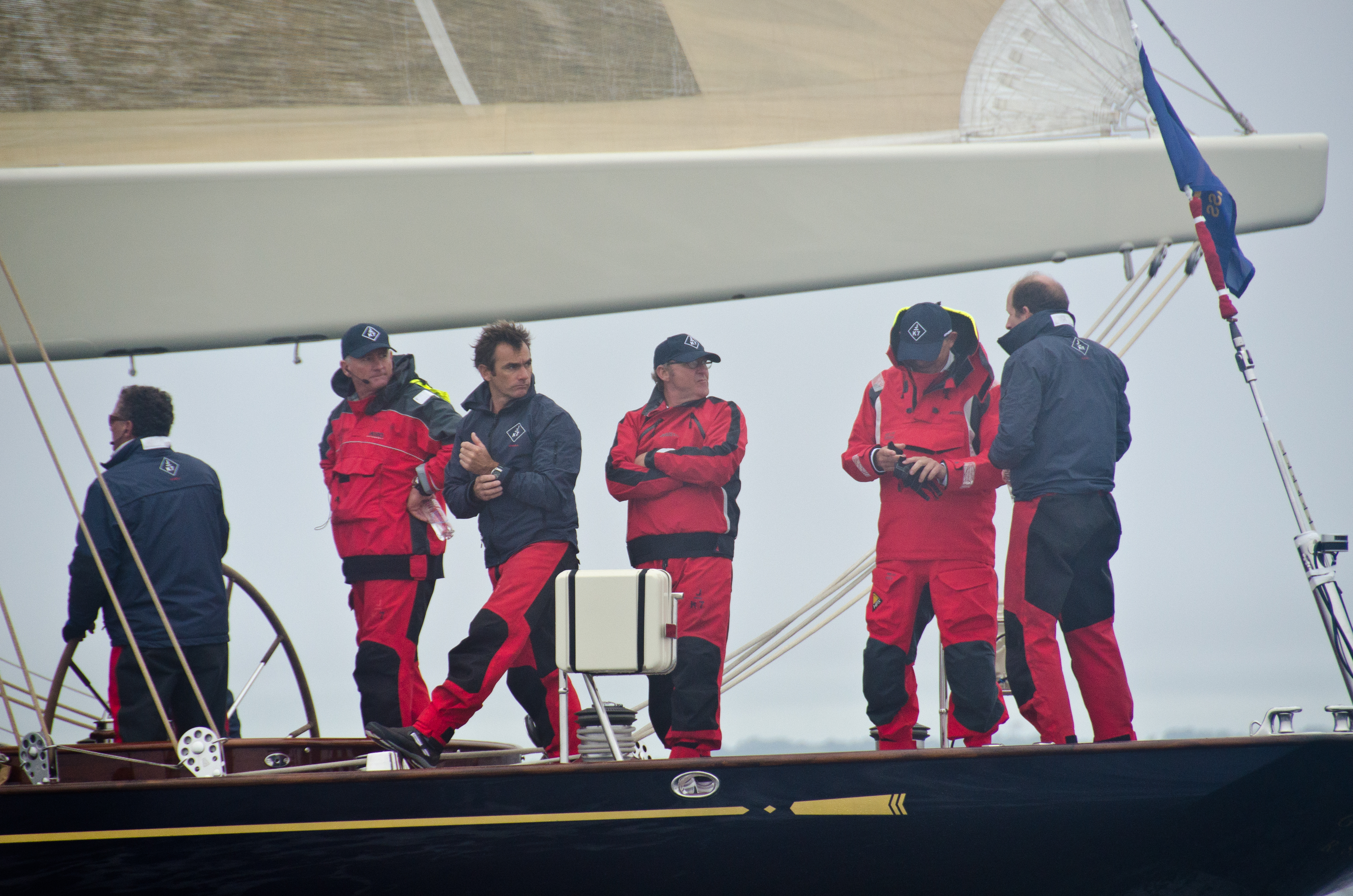
Velsheda's crew at the J-Class regatta in Falmouth, 2012

Velsheda under sail at the J-Class regatta in Newport RI, 2017
