= 1937 America's Cup =

Sailing event

16th America's Cup
Defender United States
- Defender club: New York Yacht Club
- Yacht: Ranger

Challenger United Kingdom
- Challenger club: Royal Yacht Squadron
- Yacht: Endeavour II

Competition
- Location: Newport
- 41°29′N 71°19′W
- Dates: 1937
- Rule: Universal Rule, J-class
- Winner: New York Yacht Club
- Score: 4–0

The 1937 America's Cup was the 16th challenge for the Cup. It took place in Newport and consisted of a series of races between the defender Ranger, entered Harold S. Vanderbilt, and Endeavour II, the second in Sir Thomas Sopwith's line of Cup challengers.

In 1935, Sir Richard Fairey issued a challenge to the New York Yacht Club for the America's Cup. In it, Fairey proposed that the race be held among K-class yachts, smaller than the J-class raced in the previous two competitions. The NYYC declined this challenge, preferring to keep the competition among the J-class.

The following year, Sir Thomas Sopwith, the challenger in the 1934 competition issued a new challenge of his own, for J-class yachts. The NYYC accepted this challenge, but since 1936 was an American presidential election year, they opted to hold the races in 1937.

Harold S. Vanderbilt who had been central to the NYYC's previous two defenses, attempted to form a syndicate to fund a defense to Sopwith's challenge. However, the poor state of the American economy meant that he could not attract backers, and eventually funded the entire defense himself, investing $400,000 (around $8.5 million in 2022 dollars). His yacht, Ranger was designed by Olin Stephens and Stanley Burgess and built at the Bath Iron Works.

Sopwith commissioned Endeavour II from Charles Nicholson and brought her across the Atlantic with Endeavour to conduct tests with different combinations of sails and spars.

Because Ranger was the only candidate put forward to defend the Cup, there were no selection trials, but Vanderbilt practised racing the yacht against the J-class Yankee which had been an unsuccessful contender for the defense of the cup in 1930.

As in the previous two competitions, the winner was to be the best of seven races. The first three races were uneventful, and Ranger won them easily — the second race by over eighteen minutes. In the fourth race, Vanderbilt maneuvered towards the start buoy in a way that forced Endeavour II to pass the buoy before the starting gun fired. Because of this, Endeavour II had to circle the buoy and begin the race again, having lost 75 seconds in the maneuver. Ranger won this race by three minutes and successfully defended the Cup.

== Bibliography ==
- Dear, Ian (2004). Enterprise to Endeavour: the J-Class Yachts. London: Adlard Coles Nautical.
- Rayner, Ranulf (2022). The Story of the America's Cup 1851–2021. Illustrated by Tim Thompson. Woodbridge: ACC Art Books.
