= Ranger (yacht) =

Yacht that won the 1937 America's Cup

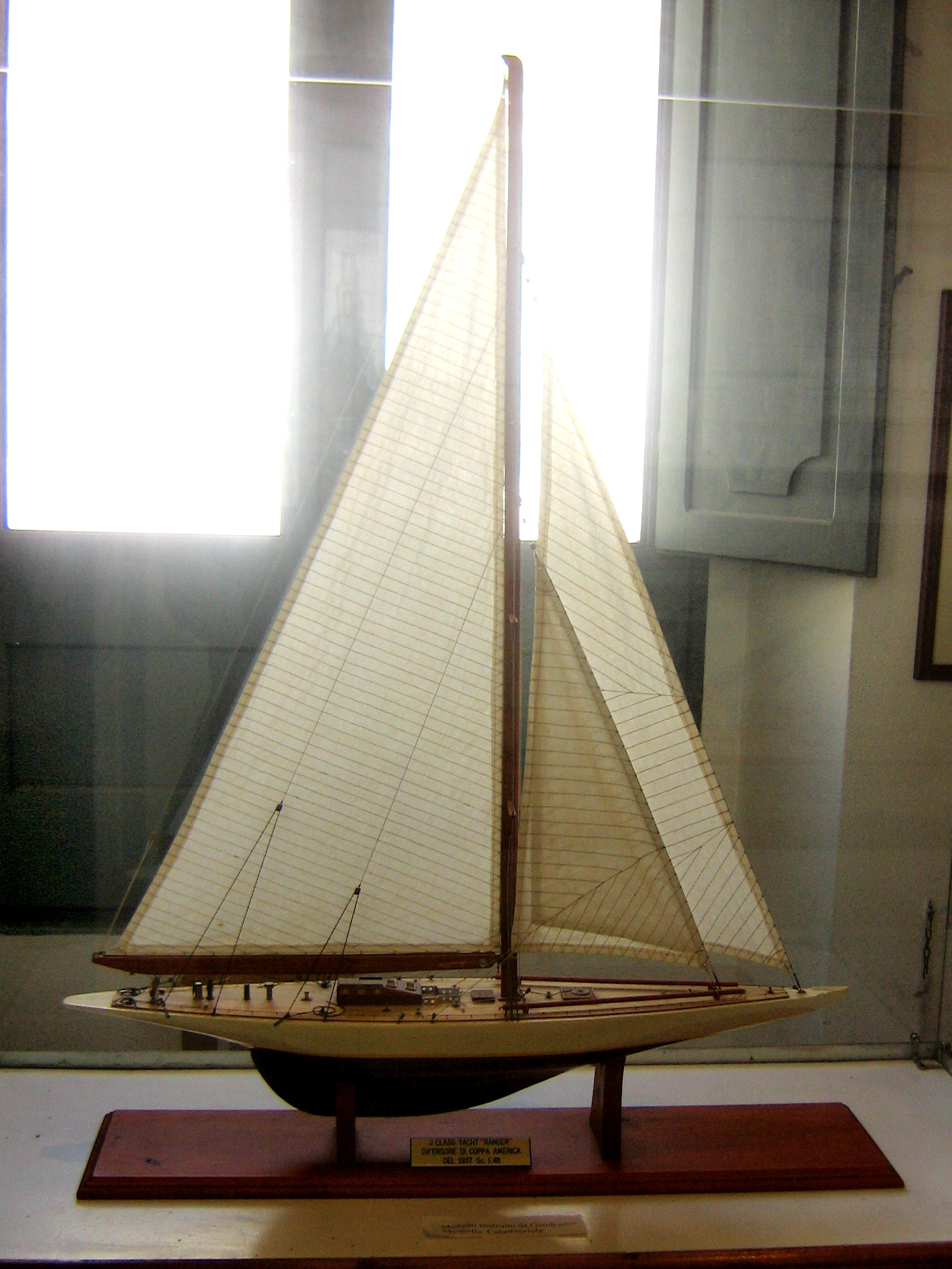
- A model of the Ranger
- Yacht club: New York Yacht Club
- Nation: United States
- Class: J class
- Designer(s): Starling Burgess, Olin Stephens
- Builder: Bath Iron Works
- Launched: May 11, 1937
- Owner(s): Harold Stirling Vanderbilt
- Fate: Scrapped c.1940

Racing career
- Notable victories: 1937 America's Cup
- America's Cup: 1937

Specifications
- Displacement: 166 tons
- Length: 135 ft 2 in (41.20 m) (LOA); 87 ft (27 m) (LWL)
- Beam: 20 ft 10 in (6.35 m)
- Draft: 15 ft (4.6 m)

Ranger was a J-class racing yacht that successfully defended the 1937 America's Cup, defeating the British challenger Endeavour II 4–0 at Newport, Rhode Island. It was the last time J-class yachts would race for the America's Cup.

== Design ==
Harold Stirling Vanderbilt funded construction of Ranger, and she was launched on May 11, 1937. She was designed by Starling Burgess and Olin Stephens, and constructed by Bath Iron Works. Stephens would credit Burgess with actually designing Ranger, but the radical departure from the heavy displacement sailing yachts was attributal to Stephens himself who had first used the design in Dorade, winner of the 1931 Trans-Atlantic Race. Geerd Hendel, Burgess's chief draftsman, also had a hand in drawing many of the plans.

The hull was all-steel welded by a shielded arc process with a weight-saving aluminum, arc-welded, mast counterbalanced with a 110-ton lead keel supported by an arc-welded steel keel plate.

Ranger was constructed according to the Universal Rule that constrained the various dimensions of racing yachts, such as sail area and length. Often referred to as the "super J", Ranger received a rating of 76, the maximum allowed while still adhering to the Universal Rule.

== Career ==
Ranger raced Endeavour II in the 1937 America's Cup, winning 4–0.

Ranger was scrapped between either 1941 or 1946 – sources differ.

== Replica ==
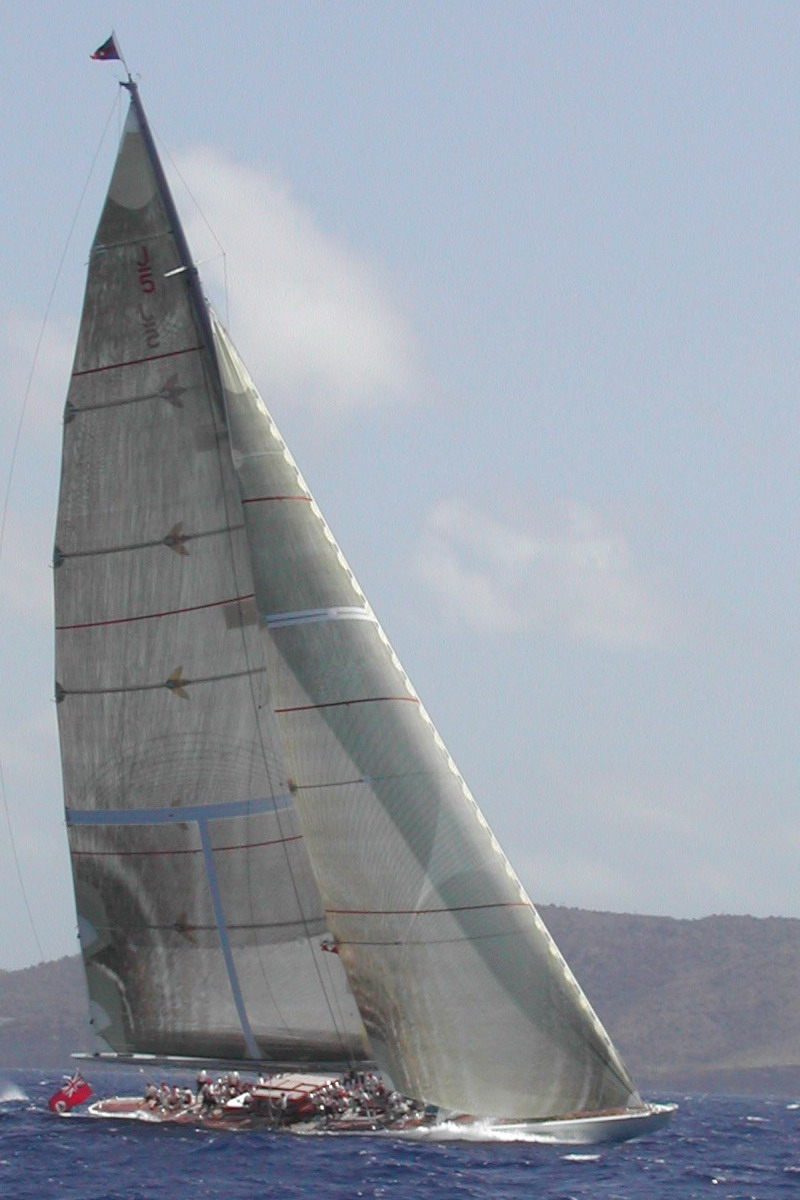
Ranger replica at Antigua Classic Yacht Regatta April 13, 2005

Construction of a replica of Ranger was started at Danish Yacht Boatyard (by Royal Denship) in early 2002 and was completed in late December 2003. The original designs were used as the basis for the new boat but were updated to conform to the latest safety regulations and the requirement of the owner to cross oceans in comfort.
