= Rainbow (yacht) =

1930s American J-class yacht

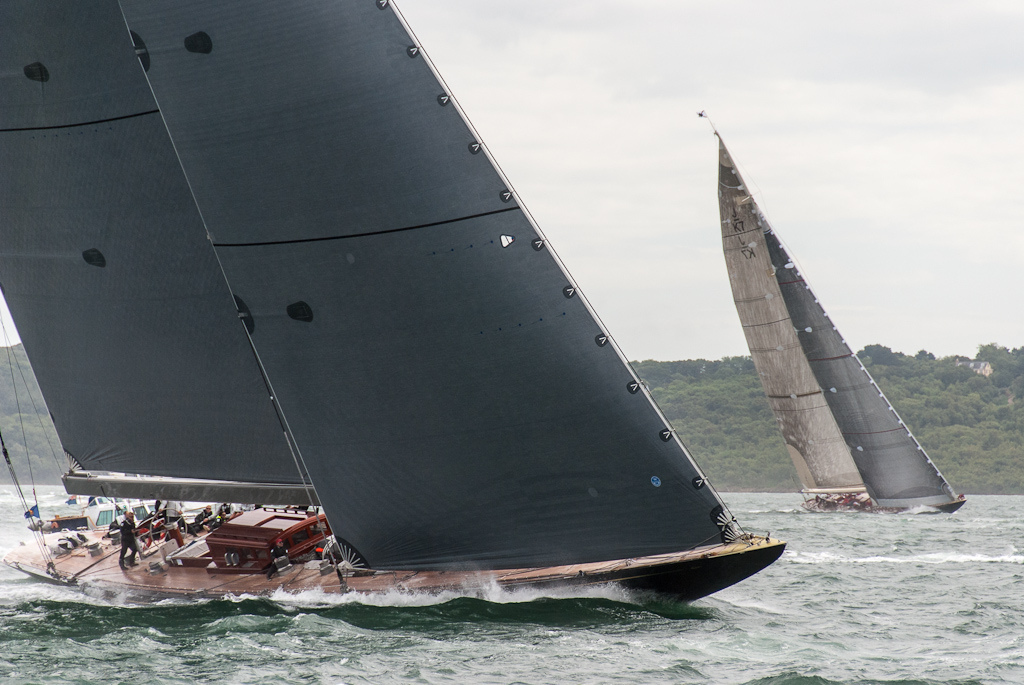
- The replica Rainbow (foreground) and Velsheda in 2012.
- Yacht club: New York Yacht Club
- Nation: United States
- Class: J-class
- Sail no: 4, 5
- Designer(s): William Starling Burgess
- Builder: Herreshoff Manufacturing Company
- Launched: 15 May 1934
- Owner(s): Harold Vanderbilt syndicate (1934–37); Chandler Hovey (1937)
- Fate: Scrapped in 1940

Racing career
- Notable victories: 1934 America's Cup
- America's Cup: 1934 America's Cup
- AC Defender Selection Series: 1937 America's Cup Defender Selections Series

Specifications
- Displacement: 176 tons
- Length: 39.95 m (131 ft) (LOA) 27.1 m (89 ft) (LWL)
- Beam: 6.37 m (21 ft)
- Draft: 4.8 m (16 ft)

Rainbow was a J-class yacht built in 1934 and successful defender of the 1934 America's Cup. It was ordered by Harold Vanderbilt and designed by William Starling Burgess. Rainbow was scrapped in 1940.

== Replica ==
A replica, Rainbow, was launched in 2012 at Holland Jachtbouw. In January 2015 it was reported that she was for sale with an asking price of €10,450,000 VAT paid.
