= Elizabeth Meyer =

Sailor and boat restorer (born 1953)

Elizabeth E Meyer (born 1953; Baltimore, Maryland) was instrumental in the restoration of the J Class Yachts beginning with Endeavour in the mid-1980s.

== Life ==
Her parents were medical doctors: a psychiatrist and an epidemiologist. Her grandfather was Eugene Meyer, investment banker and first president of the World Bank. He also owned The Washington Post publishing company. Her grandmother was Agnes Ernst Meyer, social activist and journalist. Elizabeth's aunt was Katharine Graham, owner of The Washington Post during Watergate. Meyer attended a Quaker Friends Academy and Bennington College in Vermont where she studied English. For a time she worked at sail making, also volunteering at a zoo and running a restaurant before starting a building restoration company in 1977. She published Yaahting, a parody of the magazine Yachting. She also wrote for Nautical Quarterly.

She is married to Michael McCaffrey.

== Yacht restoration ==
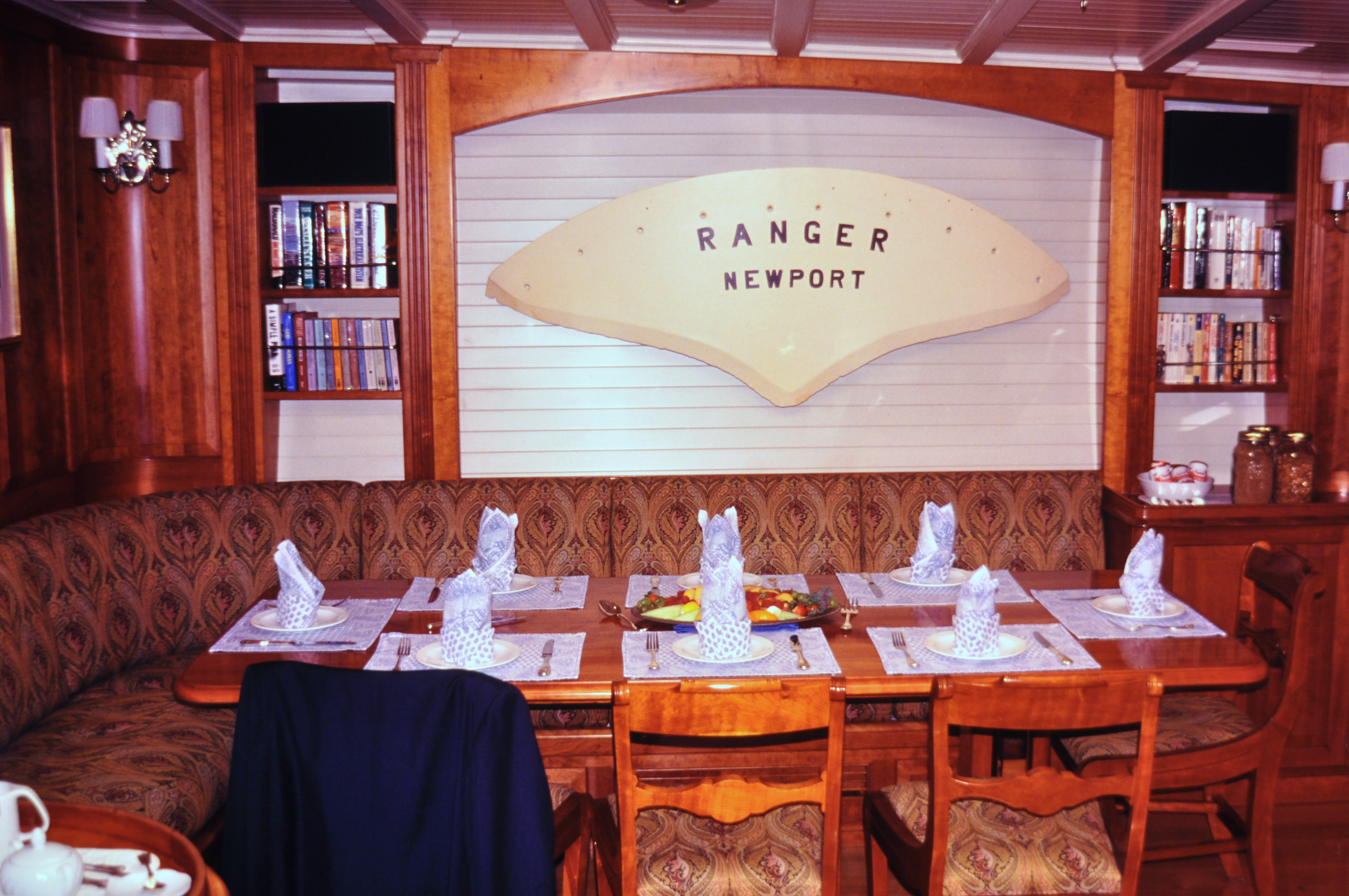
Endeavour (1934), refitted 1984

In 1984 she purchased the J class yacht Endeavour and began the restoration. She was also instrumental in the restoration of Shamrock V. She founded the International Yacht Restoration School in 1993. For her efforts in building and yacht restoration she received the president's award from the National Trust for Historic Preservation. In 2011 she received the Don Turner Award from the USS Constitution Museum for her work in maritime preservation. From 1975 to 1993 she owned the Concordia yawl Matinicus and has authored books on the Ray Hunt designed class. She now sails Seminole, a 1916 Lawley-built 47 ft (14.3m) gaff yawl, bought in 1996. She completed its restoration in 2005
