= Columbia (schooner) =

Columbia was an American schooner, a fishing vessel launched in 1923. She took part in several races, and subsequently disappeared off Nova Scotia in 1927. A replica was built in 2014.

== Construction ==
The original Columbia was a gaff rigged schooner of 140 tons, built in Essex, Massachusetts and launched on April 7, 1923. She was designed by W. Starling Burgess and built by Arthur Dana Story. She was built to race the Canadian schooner Bluenose.

== Racing ==
The International Fisherman's Trophy was awarded to the fastest fishing schooner that worked in the North Atlantic deep sea fishing industry. The fastest schooner had to win two out of three races in order to claim the trophy.

At the hands of her skipper, Ben Pine, Columbia came very close to reclaiming the Esperanto Cup (the trophy from the International Fishermen's Races) for the US in 1923, but no winner was named.

The International Fishermen's Trophy race was held off Halifax, Nova Scotia in October 1923 and new rules were put in place preventing ships from passing marker buoys to landward. During the first race, the schooners dueled inshore, the rigging of the vessels coming together. However, Bluenose won the first race. During the second race, Bluenose broke the new rule and was declared to have lost the race. Captain Angus Walters protested the decision and demanded that no vessel be declared winner. The judging committee rejected his protest, which led Walters to remove Bluenose from the competition. The committee declared the competition a tie, and the two vessels shared the prize money and the title. The anger over the events led to an eight-year hiatus in the race.

She won her trials in 1926, but never again took part in the finals.

== Disappearance ==
On August 26, 1927, while fishing, Columbia and her crew of 22 disappeared off Sable Island.

== Replica ==
A replica of the Columbia, built by the Eastern Shipbuilding Group, was launched in Panama City, Florida in 2014 and has taken part in the America's Cup Superyacht Regatta.

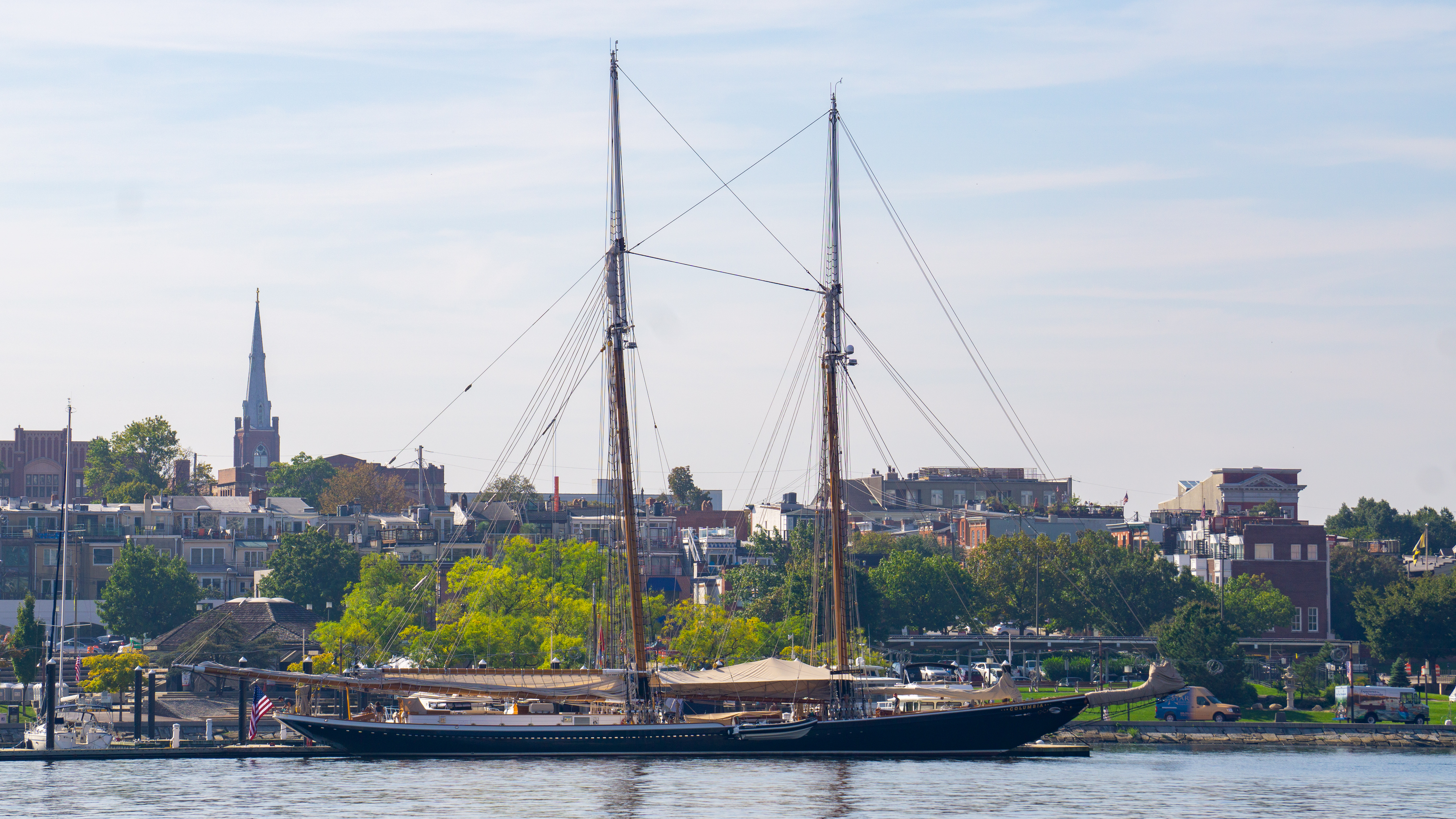
Replica schooner Columbia, berthed at Baltimore, Maryland, October 4, 2018
