= Olin Stephens =

American yacht designer (1908–2008)

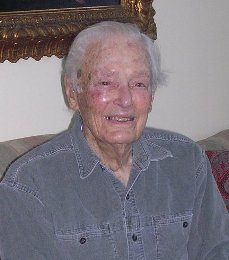
Olin Stephens sitting with jam; taken at Olin's apartment in New Hampshire.

Olin James Stephens II (April 13, 1908 – September 13, 2008) was an American yacht designer. Stephens was born in New York City, but spent his summers with his brother Rod, learning to sail on the New England coast. He also attended the Massachusetts Institute of Technology for a term.

Stephens' name had a long history in connection with America's Cup. He assisted W. Starling Burgess with the design of the J-Class Ranger, which won the America's Cup in 1937, defeating the Royal Yacht Squadron's Endeavour II in four races. He was the original designer of six out of seven successful 12 Metre defenders of the America's Cup between 1958 and 1980, with the exception of Weatherly in 1962. Other than Ranger, the most remarkable of his defenders was Intrepid. She had a rudder separate from her keel to reduce wetted surface and improve steering. Stephens had previously designed separate rudders on a number of increasingly large ocean racers of the 1960s, most notably Thomas Watson's state of the art Palawan III, before using it successfully on the Intrepid in 1967. After alterations by Britton Chance, Jr., she won the America's Cup again in 1970.

Stephens also designed many off-shore and stock boats, including the Dark Harbor 20, which he designed in 1934. His brother, Roderick Stephens, was also a partner in the yacht-designing and yacht brokerage firm Sparkman & Stephens, specializing in supervision and testing of yachts designed by the firm. Olin was working in the Nevins shipyard in 1928 as a draftsman when he first met yacht broker Drake Sparkman. They together set up an office next door to Nevins in 1929. Since retiring from the company he lived in Hanover, New Hampshire, where he spent his final years writing computer programs for designing yachts. He was awarded the Herreshoff Award by the North American Yacht Racing Union in 1965 for his contributions to sailing.

Stephens was also involved in ocean-going sailboats. His yawl designs Dorade (1929) and Stormy Weather (1934), his favorite design, each won the Newport Bermuda Race and the Fastnet race several times. Both brothers were accomplished yachtsmen. They were members of the winning crews of Dorade and Ranger. Olin served as tactician and navigator, while Rod trimmed the rig and sails. In 1959, he was awarded the David W. Taylor Medal by the Society of Naval Architects and Marine Engineers.

In the 1960s and 1970s, Olin contributed to the luxury yacht builders Nautor Swan of Finland. Dora IV, design nr. 2089, caught the eye of Pekka Koskenkylä, Nautor's founder, for it finished first in most of the races she entered, and Koskenkylä decided to go ahead and build the boat out of fiberglass, even though Dora IV had been designed for aluminium. On June 1st 1973, the design nr. 2110 was finished, later better known as the Nautor’s Swan 65, that won the first Whitbread race (Sayula II). Olin had also actively collaborated with the shipyard of Argentario, in Porto Santo Stefano, Italy.

== Later years ==
In 1993, Stephens was inducted into the America's Cup Hall of Fame and awarded the Gibbs Brothers Medal from the National Academy of Sciences. Several years later, in 1999, he wrote the autobiography All This and Sailing Too. In 2007, he was named as one of six inductees to the inaugural ISAF Sailing Hall of Fame. Stephens was inducted into the National Sailing Hall of Fame in 2011. He was ranked member number 1 on the New York Yacht Club Member Seniority List at the time of his death. Stephens died exactly five months after celebrating his 100th birthday in 2008.
