= Stormy Weather (yacht) =

Stormy Weather is a 54 feet (16 m) ocean-racing yawl that was designed by Olin Stephens when he was only twenty-five, and launched from the Henry B. Nevins yard in New York on 14 May 1934.

She was named after the song of the same name, written by Harold Arlen and Ted Koehler. Her first owner, Philip LeBoutillier, was President of the Best & Co. department store on Fifth Avenue in Manhattan. Apocryphally, he first heard the song sung by Lena Horne, while he was dining at The Montauk Manor resort on Long Island in 1933, and promptly chose the name for his new boat.

In 1935 she won both the Newport-Bergen Transatlantic race and the Fastnet race. She later won the Miami-Nassau race on five occasions, every year from 1937 to 1941, under the ownership of Bob Johnson until 1939, and thereafter of Bill Labrot. She has raced continuously to the present day, now competing in the Panerai Classic Yacht series in the Mediterranean.

An evolution from his equally famous Dorade (1929), Stormy Weather, Sparkman & Stephens design #27, was often named by Olin Stephens as one of his favorite designs. The most obvious part of this evolution was an increase in beam of some twenty per cent, due to the introduction of a "narrow beam penalty" in the 1934 Cruising Club of America handicap rules. Sparkman & Stephens later created many successful variants of the same basic design, such as the sloop Sonny, and the larger and smaller yawls Bolero and Loki.

Stormy Weather has crossed the Atlantic thirty six times, and undergone two major restorations, one in the Caribbean the early 1980s, and most recently at the Cantiere Navale dell' Argentario in 2000–2001.

In 1995, Stormy Weather was still competitive enough to place sixth overall in the Fastnet race, the sixtieth anniversary of her victory. Stormy Weather raced again in the Fastnet in 2015 to celebrate the eightieth anniversary of her victory. On this occasion she placed eleventh overall and fourth in her class. The boat was completely restored in 2001 at the shipyard of Argentario, in Porto Santo Stefano, Italy. Olin Stephens last raced on Stormy Weather at Argentario, in 2007, when he was 98 years old.
