= Dorade (yacht) =

American yacht launched 1930

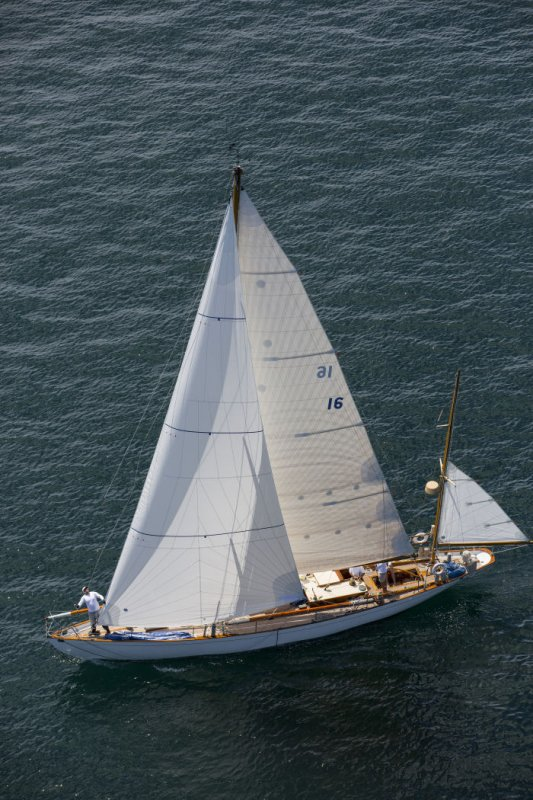
- S/Y Dorade 2014 Bermuda Race

History

United States
- Name: Dorade
- Owner: Roderick Stephens, Sr, New York, United States
- Port of registry: USA
- Ordered: 1929
- Designer: Olin Stephens of Sparkman & Stephens
- Builder: Minneford Yacht Yard, City Island, New York
- Cost: $28,000
- Yard number: S&S 07
- Laid down: 1929
- Launched: 1930
- Home port: Newport Beach, California
- Status: Active

General characteristics
- Displacement: 14.75 tons
- Ballast: 18,000 lbs. Lead
- Length: 52.0 ft (15.8 m)
- Waterline: 37 feet 3 inches (11.35 m)
- Beam: 10 feet 3 inches (3.12 m)
- Draught: 8.0 ft (2.4 m)
- Propulsion: 1 x Perkins: Diesel 40 hp (30 kW)
- Rig: Yawl
- Sail plan: 1,100 ft^{2} (100 m^{2})

Dorade is a yacht designed in 1929 by Olin Stephens of Sparkman & Stephens and built 1929–1930 by the Minneford Yacht Yard in City Island, New York.

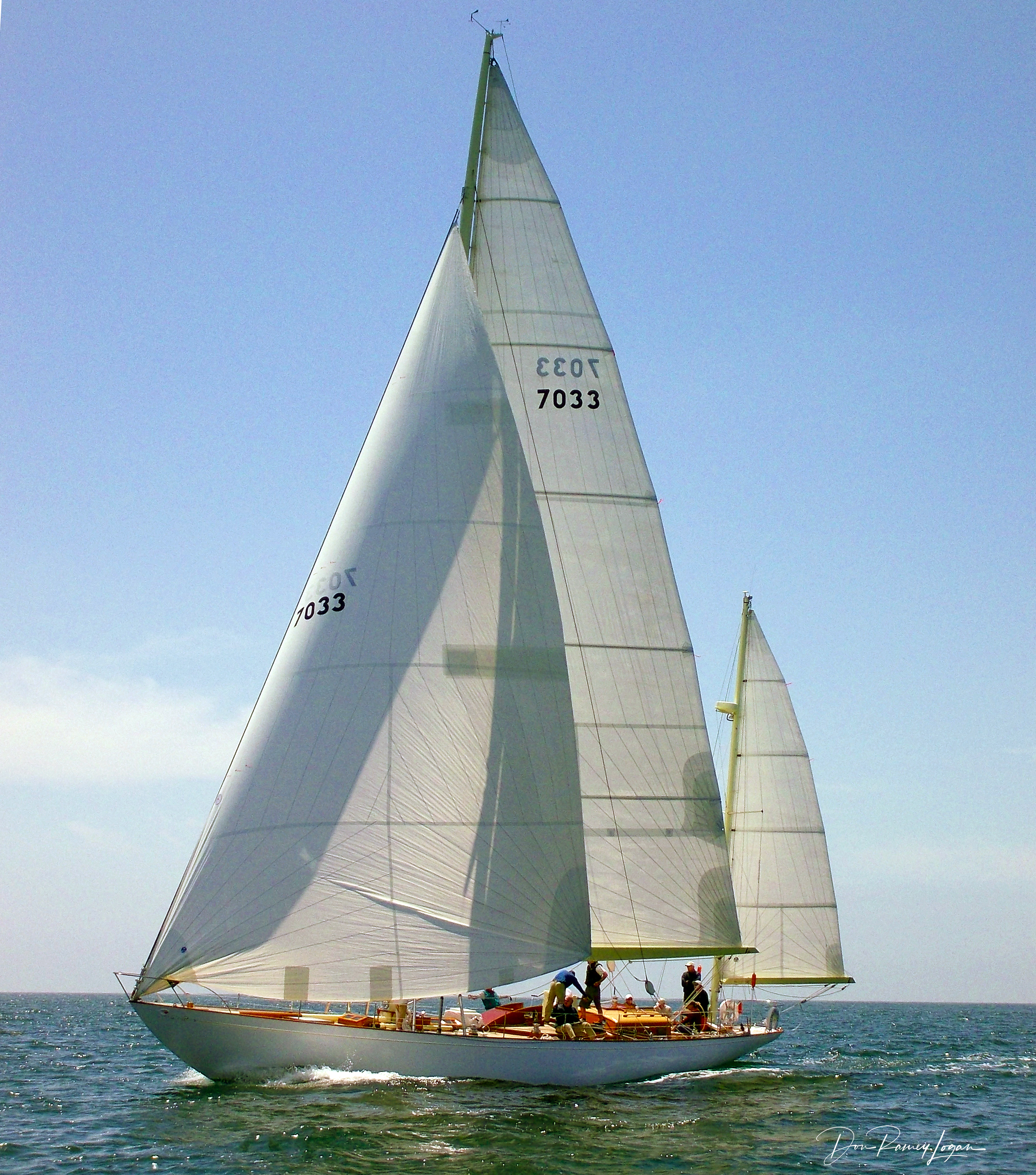
Dorade was built 1929–1930 by the Minneford Yacht Yard in City Island, New York

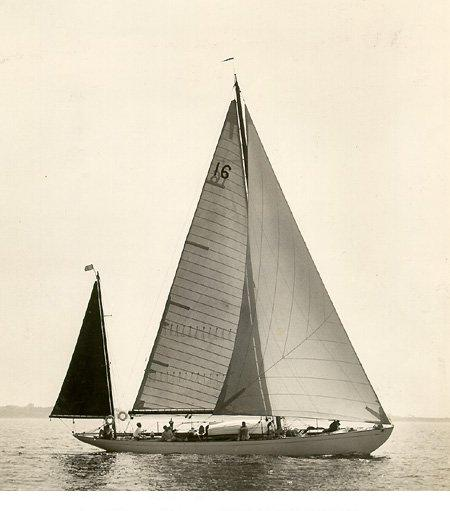
Dorade 1931

With Stephens as skipper, Dorade went on to place 2nd in the Bermuda Race later that year. The crew for its first race received the All-Amateur Crew Prize. However, it would be a year later, that Dorade made its name by winning the 1931 Transatlantic Race. She completed a race that takes an estimated 3–4 weeks in just 17 days, earning her crew a parade upon the boat's return and a reception for Olin Stephens hosted by the mayor of New York. While in England that summer, Dorade also won the Fastnet Race.

In 1932, Stephens handed the boat to his brother, Rod Stephens. Led by Rod, Dorade sailed to victory in the 1932 Bermuda Race. From Bermuda, Dorade sailed back to Norway, down to Cowes, England, and finally back to America after winning the Fastnet Race. The victory in the 1932 Fastnet Race was of substantial significance given the unusually severe weather, several ships feared missing as well as one recorded drowning among the events that unfolded.

In 2013, Dorade took first place (after applying her handicap) in the Trans-Pacific race, which she first won in 1936.

The yawl is also notable for the introduction of the Dorade box, a ventilator arrangement which became a standard fitting on small sailing craft.

== Major races ==
- 1930 Bermuda Race, Class B: Second; First all-amateur crew; Fall Rendezvous: Cruising Club of America, First in Fleet
- 1931 Trans-Atlantic Race: First; Cowes Round-The-Island Race: Second; Cowes Cruising Class: Second; Fastnet Race: First
- 1932 Bermuda Race: First, Class B
- 1933 Oslo to Hanko Match Race with "Jolie Brise": Winner; Fastnet Race: First
- 1936 San Francisco-Farallon Race: First; Transpacific Yacht Race: First
- 1947–1979 Participated in fifteen Swiftsure races: First in Class AA 1947–1948, 1951, 1954, and 1964.
- 2013 First overall Transpacific Race

Dorade raced from the east coast 1930 through 1935, moving to San Francisco for several years, then on to Seattle in the late 1930s. She returned to the bay area from 1979 to 1984. Dorade's home berth is now Newport, Rhode Island.

== Restoration ==
- Dorade was completely restored in 1997 at the shipyard of Argentario, in Porto Santo Stefano, Italy.

== See also ==
- Dorade box, a ventilator arrangement first used on Dorade

== Sources ==
- A. Hollingsworth, The Way of a Yacht, Newton Abbot London 1974.
- official website
- Newport Bermuda Race website (results archive)
