= Endeavour (yacht) =

Yacht (1934)

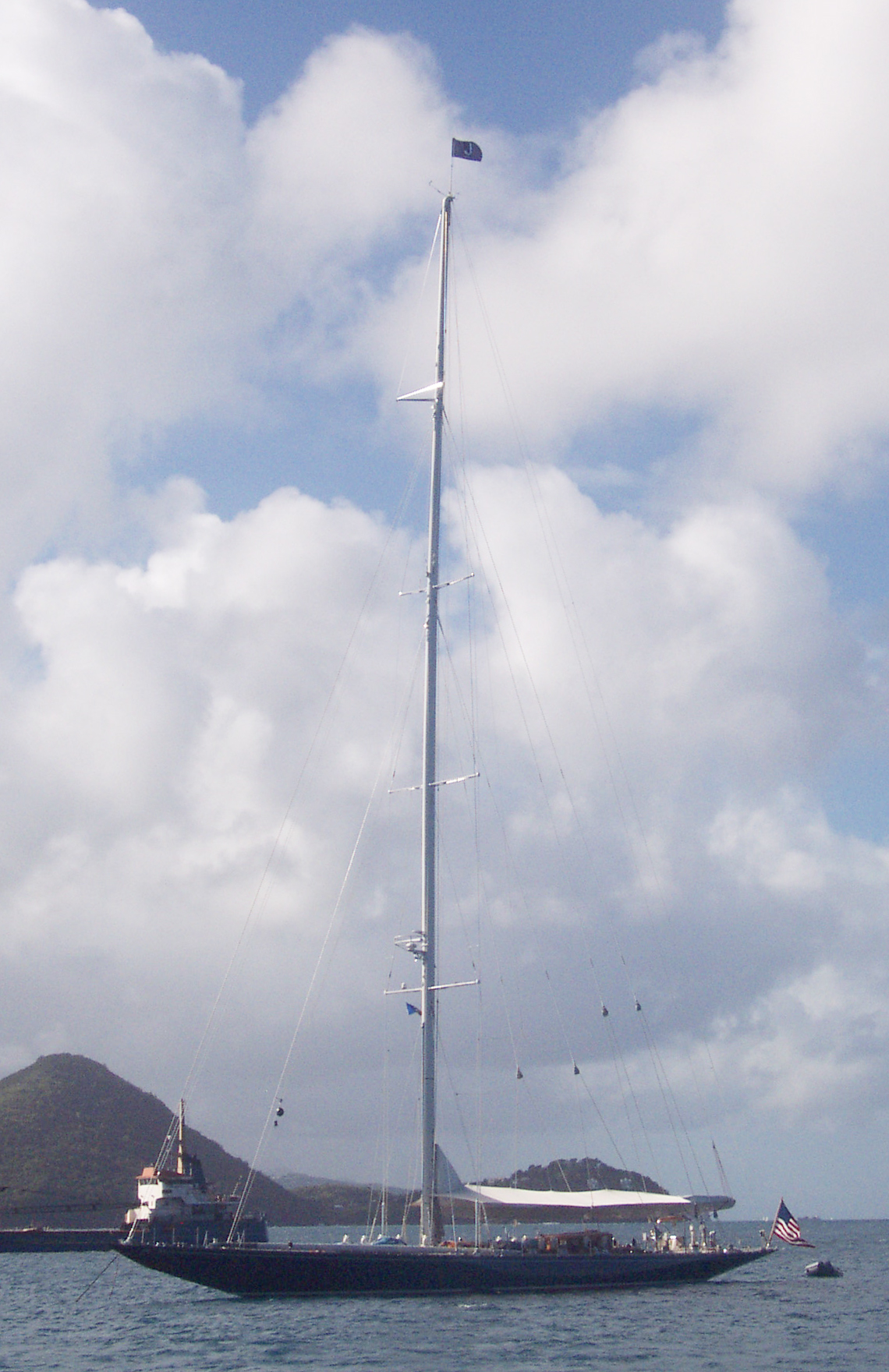
- Endeavour in 2004
- Yacht club: Royal Yacht Squadron
- Nation: United Kingdom
- Class: J-class
- Designer(s): Charles Ernest Nicholson
- Builder: Camper and Nicholsons; Gosport, United Kingdom
- Launched: 1934
- Owner(s): Sir Thomas Sopwith 1934; Elizabeth Meyer 1984; L. Dennis Kozlowski 2000; Cassio Antunes 2006

Racing career
- America's Cup: 1934

Specifications
- Displacement: 143 tons
- Length: 129 ft 6 in (39.47 m) (LOA); 88 ft 2 in (26.87 m) (LWL)
- Beam: 22 ft (6.71 m)
- Draft: 14 ft 9 in (4.50 m)
- Sail area: 7,651 sq ft (710.8 m^{2})

Endeavour is a J-class yacht built for the 1934 America's Cup by Camper and Nicholson in Gosport, England. She was built for Thomas Sopwith who used his aviation design expertise to ensure the yacht was the most advanced of its day with a steel hull and mast. She was 130-foot (40 m) and launched in 1934 and won many races in her first season including against the J's Velsheda and Shamrock V. She failed in her America's Cup challenge against the American defender Rainbow but came closer to lifting the cup than any other until Australia II succeeded in 1983.

== Design ==
Endeavour was designed by Charles Ernest Nicholson. Nicholson opted for a conservative hull shape, which was not tank-tested before construction. Construction was of steel throughout. Endeavour carried more winches than her competitor Rainbow, and they were four-speed mechanisms, against the two-speed winches on Rainbow.

Endeavour pioneered the Quadrilateral genoa, a twin-clewed headsail offering great sail area and consequent power. Frank Murdoch, an aeronautical engineer who worked for Sopwith, helped design the rigging. Murdoch also designed an electrical indicator which provided the helmsman with a precise indication of the relative wind direction, which up to now had been approximated by observing a pennant at the top of the mast.

Endeavour was originally fitted with a flexible boom that allowed the foot of the mainsail to bend into an aerodynamically efficient shape. The 1930 Cup winner Enterprise had demonstrated the advantage of allowing the foot to bend this way, albeit using a completely different mechanism (the "Park Avenue" boom). Endeavour's flexible boom broke during trials and she sailed the 1934 regatta season with an ordinary, rigid boom. For the Cup races, she was fitted with a Park Avenue boom.

== Career ==
=== 1934 regatta season ===
Endeavour raced in the 1934 regatta season in the "Big Class" against Astra, HMY Britannia, Candida, Shamrock (ex-Shamrock V), and Velsheda. During this time, she won four out of five races.

=== America's Cup ===
Endeavour challenged for the 1934 America's Cup and raced New York Yacht Club defender Rainbow.

Following the regatta season, Endeavour commenced tuning-up trials against Velsheda. In particular, this was an opportunity to test her innovative quadrilateral jib, to great success. By the time she departed for the United States, Endeavour had won eight races and placed second in three out of a total of twelve starts.

Eight days before this departure, a pay dispute arose between Sopwith and his crew. The crew were being paid £5 per week (about £280 in 2022 money), but wanted an allowance for "going foreign" and a share of prize money if they won. Sopwith instead presented two counter-offers: either a base pay of £5 10s per week, with an increase to £6 10s if they won, or a base pay of £4 9s per week increasing to £8 per week if they won. Unwilling to accept either option, and with Sopwith refusing to negotiate further, thirteen (about half) of the crew quit. With only a few days' notice, Sopwith was unable to recruit professional crew replacements, and instead filled his crew with amateur yachtsmen. This replacement crew was sourced by Christopher Boardman, who had won the gold medal for sailing at the 1936 Summer Olympics in the 6-metre class and who also joined the crew. Most of them came from the Royal Corinthian Yacht Club and although experienced sailors, had not sailed anything close to the size of a J-class. Sopwith arranged for this replacement crew to travel to Le Havre to gain experience on Shamrock and other Js that were available to them.

Endeavour was towed across the Atlantic by Sopwith's motor yacht Vita, arriving at Newport in late August. Sopwith had already arrived separately and had been given a tour of the defender, Rainbow, by her skipper Harold S. Vanderbilt. This tour led to a protest by Sopwith that Rainbow had not followed the spirit of a new rule introduced to the competition that year that yachts should be fitted out with crew accommodation. Below decks, Rainbow was spartan, while Endeavour even carried a bathtub in the captain's cabin. The Cup Committee responded to the protest by allowing Sopwith to strip out large parts of Endeavour's interior prior to racing. When Endeavour was ready for tuning up, Gerard Lambert offered his yacht Vanitie to Sopwith as a "trial horse".

The first race of the competition was abandoned due to light winds, Endeavour went on to easily win the first two races, and proved to be the faster boat. However, Rainbow won the third and fourth races due to better tactics, including a maneuver which led Sopwith to protest unsuccessfully to the Cup Committee. Rainbow went on to win two more races and therefore the competition, by a 4–2 margin.

=== After America's Cup ===
Following the America's Cup, she dominated the British sailing scene until, whilst being towed across the Atlantic to Britain in September 1937, she broke loose from her tow and was feared lost. the hulk was eventually found and returned to England, where she was laid up. For 46 years Endeavour languished through a variety of owners. In 1947, she was sold for scrap, saved only a few hours before her demolition was due. In the 1970s she sank in the River Medina, Isle of Wight. Endeavour was purchased for ten pounds and patched up enough to refloat. Until the mid-1980s she was on shore at Calshot Spit, an ex-seaplane base on the edge of the New Forest, Southern England. By this time she was in a desperate state, with only the hull remaining, lacking rudder, mast and keel.

=== Rebuild ===
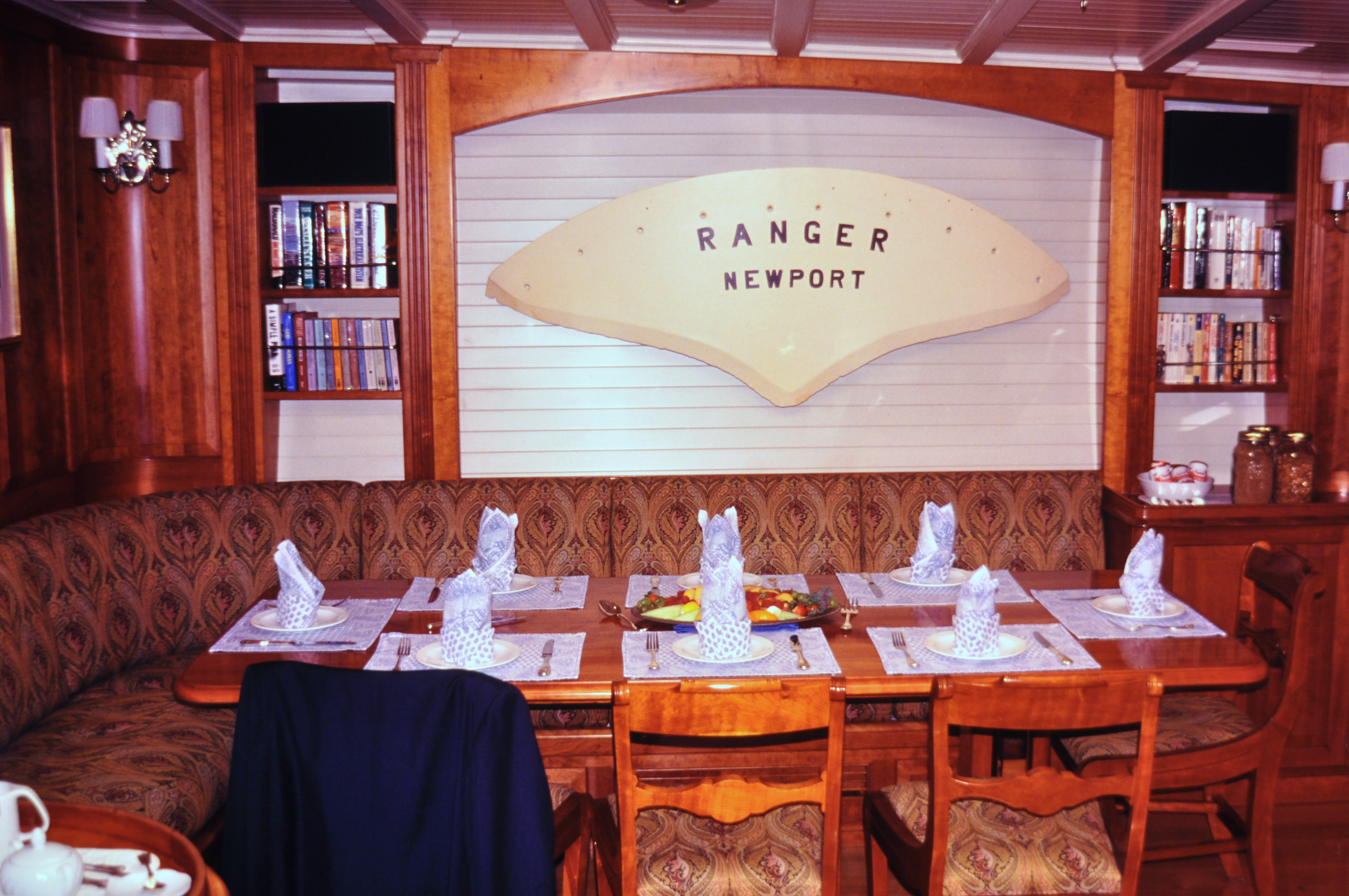
The interior after the renovation

In 1984 the hulk of Endeavour was bought by Elizabeth Meyer, who undertook a five-year project to rebuild her. The initial work was undertaken where she lay to ensure that the hull was sufficiently seaworthy to be towed to the shipyard of Royal Huisman, in Holland, who designed and installed a new rig, engine, generator and mechanical systems and fitted the interior to a very high standard.

Meyer described the rebuild not only as challenging, but also beyond her financial means. In a 2014 interview with CNN she described a "restoration urge" as being "inherent in the human nature" and said that she "immediately went 'Oh no'" when she realised the enormity of this task and that it fell to her. Meyer said she had to sell real estate investments to fund the restoration and that Endeavour was chartered throughout her entire ownership.

When Endeavour sailed again, on 22 June 1989, it was for the first time in 52 years. In September that year Meyer organised the first J‑Class race for over 50 years, pitting Endeavour against Shamrock V at Newport, Rhode Island. She needed 90 professional sailors to crew the two yachts but could not afford to pay them; despite this, the appeal and prestige of the restored J‑Class was so great that she was inundated with several hundred applications.

Endeavour cruised extensively and in 1999 joined the rebuilt Velsheda and Shamrock V to compete in the Antigua Classics Regatta.

=== 21st century ===
Meyer sold Endeavour to Dennis Kozlowski for US$15M in 2000. In 2006, she was sold again, this time to Hawaiian resident Cassio Antunes for $13.1M. In 2011, Endeavour completed an 18-month refit in New Zealand, during which a carbon-fibre mast and standing rigging were fitted and some changes were made to the deck layout. In summer 2015, it was reported that Endeavour was again for sale, with an asking price of €19,950,000.

== Bibliography ==
- Dear, Ian (2004). Enterprise to Endeavour: the J-Class Yachts. London: Adlard Coles Nautical.
