= William Starling Burgess =

American naval architect and aviation pioneer (1878–1947)

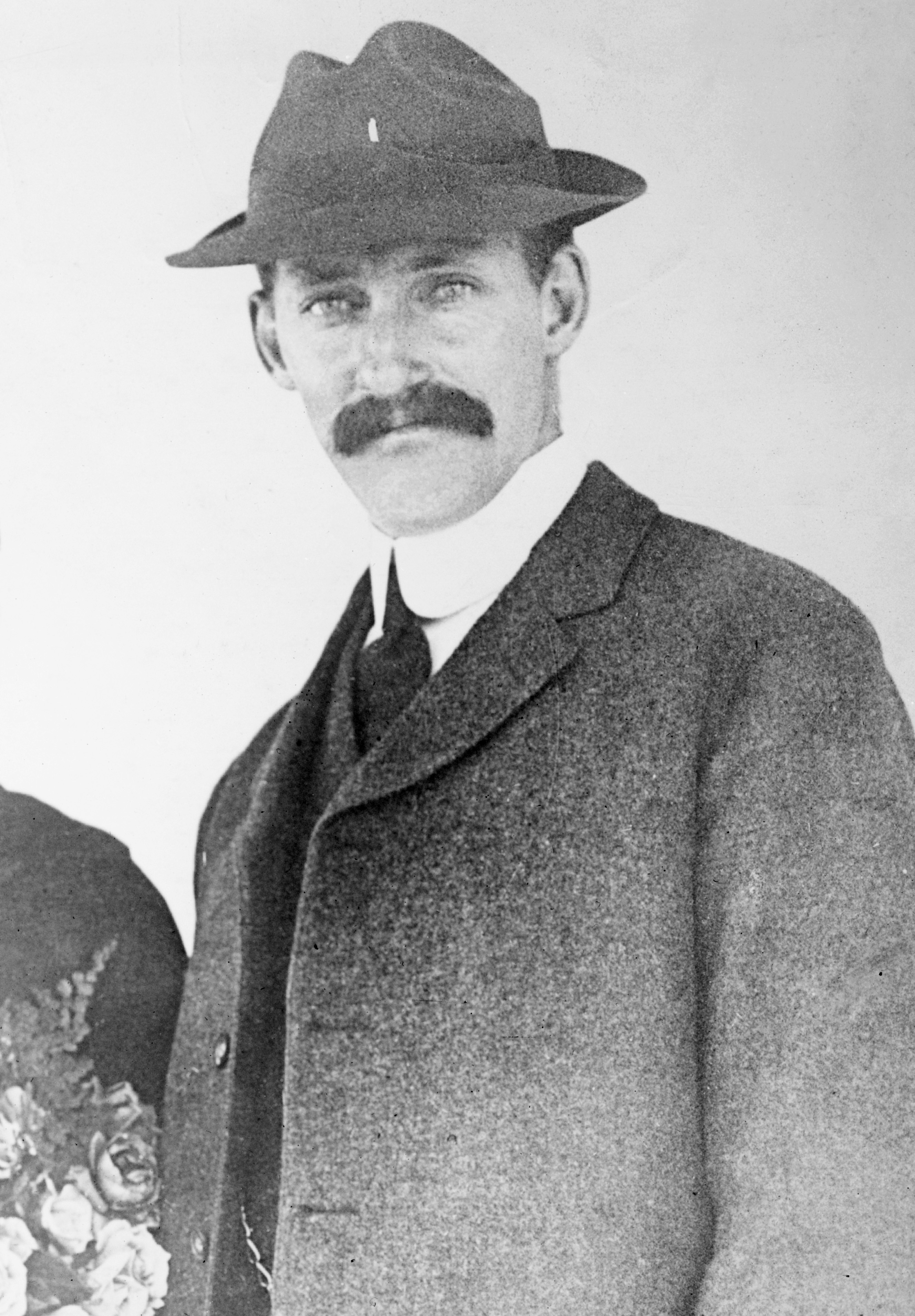
- Starling Burgess
- Born: December 25, 1878; Boston, Massachusetts
- Died: March 19, 1947 (aged 68); Hoboken, New Jersey
- Education: Milton Academy
- Known for: Collier Trophy winner
- Spouses: Helene Adams Willard; Rosamond Tudor; Else Foss; Nannie Dale Biddle; Marjorie Young
- Children: Tasha Tudor

William Starling Burgess (December 25, 1878 – March 19, 1947) was an American yacht designer, aviation pioneer, and naval architect. He was awarded the highest prize in aviation, the Collier Trophy in 1915, just two years after Orville Wright won it. In 1933 he partnered with Buckminster Fuller to design and build the radical Dymaxion Car. Between 1930 and 1937 he created three America's Cup winning J-Class yachts, Enterprise, Rainbow and Ranger (the latter in partnership with Olin Stephens).

== Biography ==
Burgess was born in Boston, Massachusetts on Christmas Day, the son of yacht designer Edward Burgess and Caroline "Kitty" Sullivant. Both of Burgess' parents died within weeks of each other when he was 12, leaving him and his 3-year-old brother to be raised by relatives.

Like his father, Starling had a great mechanical and mathematical ability and a refined sense of line, form and spatial relationship. From his mother he received a love of literature and poetry, which he regarded as the foundation for all accomplishment.

After the death of his parents, Burgess was mentored by many of his father's colleagues, including Nathanael Greene Herreshoff. This relationship was terminated by Herreshoff when Burgess confided his aspiration to become a yacht designer himself.

== Education ==
Starling attended Milton Academy, a progressive boarding school near Boston, where he became interested in aviation, designed his first sailboat, Sally II, and patented a sophisticated lightweight machine gun. Burgess graduated from Milton Academy in 1897 and entered Harvard College with the Class of 1901. As Burgess began life at Harvard, tension was building between Spain and the U.S. The mysterious sinking of an American battleship, the USS Maine, on February 15, 1898, increased the drumbeat for war, and war was declared on April 11, 1898. Starling Burgess was one of a hundred Harvard undergraduates (out of 2,400) to volunteer for military service. He enlisted in the U.S. Navy, and because of his proven expertise in weapons design, was promoted to the rank of Gunner's Mate. He received credit for the courses he missed during this period by special vote of the Harvard faculty. For reasons not entirely clear, he left Harvard without completing his degree, and opened his own yacht design office in Boston.

== Yacht Design ==
During the spring term of his senior year, in March 1901, The Rudder published the following notice: “We are glad to welcome into our company of advertisers Mr. Starling Burgess, a son of the celebrated designer. Mr. Burgess has opened an office at 15 Exchange Street, Boston, and is busily engaged in getting out the designs for several boats, among them being a yawl for Mr. Walter Burgess, whose many boats have been among the most interesting exhibits in this magazine. To the designing end Mr. Burgess has added the business of brokerage, and our readers will find several craft offered for sale in his advertisement.”

A year later he partnered with Alpheus Appleton Packard to found Burgess & Packard, Naval Architects and Engineers. In the same year he designed the revolutionary 52 LOA feet scow sloop "Outlook", a highly radical racing yacht which featured a steel truss along the deck midline allowing the hull to be flat, low and light by the standards of the day. The design featured a large, balanced, club foot, self-tacking jib set on an 8 feet bowsprit supported by a dolphin striker. It was very fast and a winner against the more conventional keel boat designs of the day. In 1905 he established a yacht yard in Marblehead, Massachusetts and began designing and building yachts and boats.

In the eyes of high society Starling was part of the "Four Hundred"—the group of long established and very rich Americans who were devoted to sailing as a recreation. However, Starling had an awkward relationship with this powerful group due to his relative lack of capital.

In 1924, the Boston pilot boat Pilot, was designed by Burgess to replace the pilot-boat Louise, which was withdrawn from pilot service on December 9, 1924. She was built for the pilots at the J. F. James shipyard at Essex, Massachusetts. The Pilot was a spoon-bowed schooner equipped with twin-screw diesel engines.

In 1928, Burgess designed the Atlantic one-design class, one of his most enduring designs, with approximately 50 boats in use as of 2020.

== Airplane Designer ==
In 1908 he became interested in aviation and in 1909 joined with airplane designer Augustus Moore Herring who had left Glenn Curtiss to form the Herring-Burgess Company. The Herring-Burgess Co. built the biplane Flying Fish, which flew over Plum Island on April 17, 1910, the second fully powered and controlled flight in New England. In 1911 Burgess built several planes licensed by the Wright Brothers. He crashed one while demonstrating at College Park Airport in June 1911. Norman Prince and his friends hired Burgess in 1912 to build a plane for them to race in the Gordon Bennett Cup Race.

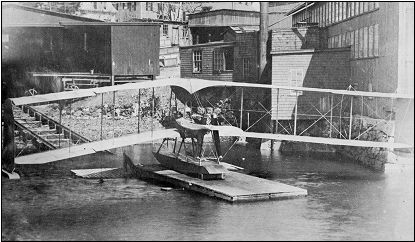

Herring left in 1910 and Greely S. Curtis and Frank Henry Russell joined Burgess to form Burgess Company and Curtis, Inc. In 1914 the renamed Burgess Company built its first hydroplane designed by J. W. Dunne and soon was selling the Burgess-Dunne hydroplanes to the U.S. Army and the U.S. Navy. In addition, the Royal Canadian Air Force purchased a Burgess Dunne hydroplane in 1914. Burgess received the 5th Collier Trophy to be issued, in 1915 for his hydro-aeroplane. With its 800 employees, Burgess Company became the largest employer in Marblehead.

At some point in this decade, Burgess designed what was almost certainly his most popular boat, the 14-foot "Brutal Beast." Simple enough for inexpensive mass-production, the Beasts became the dominant instructional craft of Marblehead—and other communities—into the forties.

When the U.S. entered World War I, the Burgess Company was sold to John N. Willys (who then sold it to Curtiss Aeroplane and Motor Company). Burgess joined the Navy, became a Lieutenant Commander and designed planes for the Navy.

== Return to Naval Architecture ==
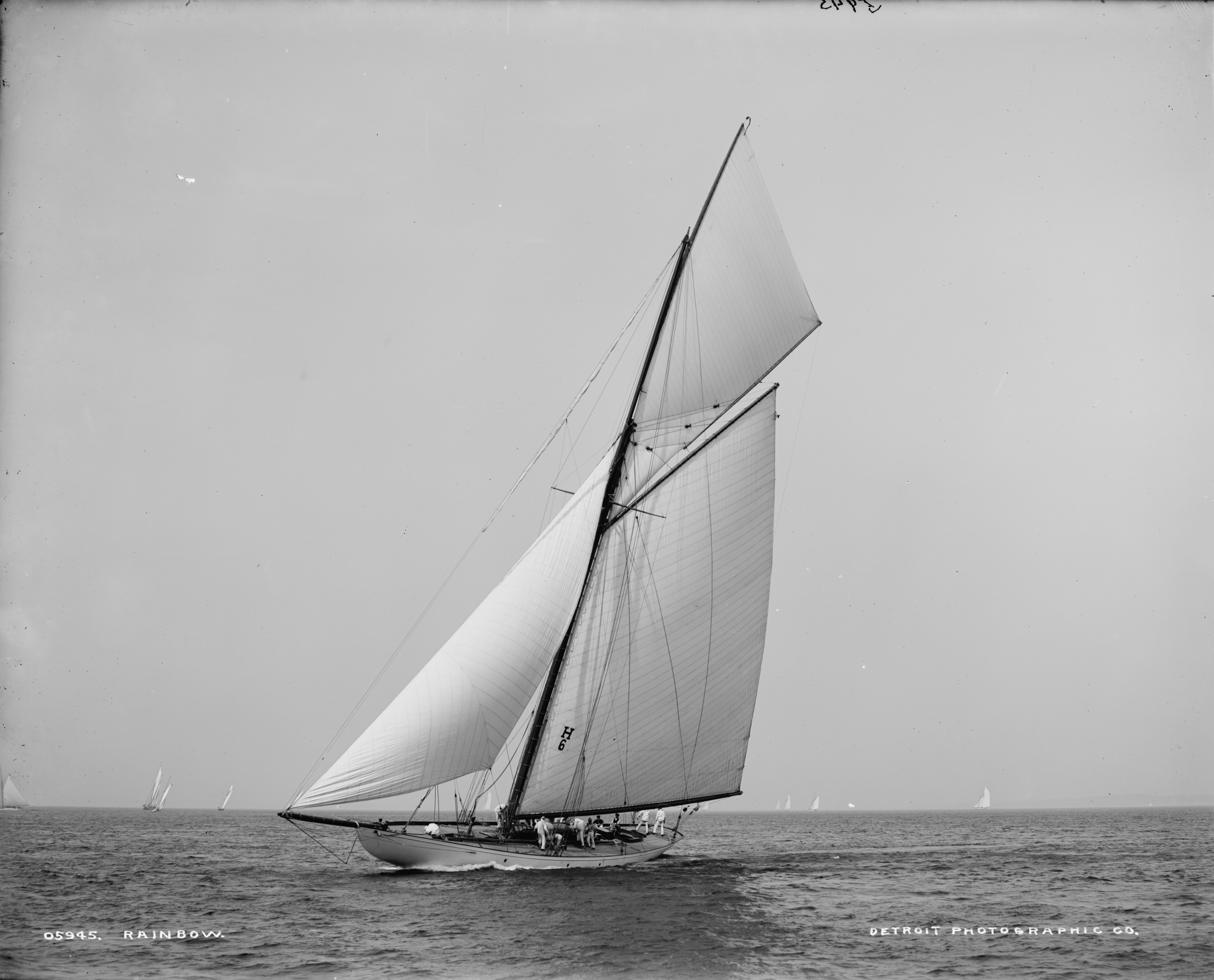
NY70 Class Rainbow

After the war he returned to boat design and construction and later designed three successful J-class yacht defenders of the America's Cup: Enterprise in 1930, Rainbow in 1934, and Ranger in 1937.

In 1922 he and A. Loring Swasey and Frank C. Paine formed the design firm Burgess, Swasey & Paine in Boston. Lewis Francis Herreshoff worked with them. They designed several yachts, including the Advance for John S. Lawrence, the Gosson for Charles Francis Adams III, the Columbia (schooner) that was designed to beat the Bluenose in the International Fisherman's Cup; and the ELLEN for Charles Foster. In 1926 he dissolved Burgess, Swasey & Paine and joined the firm Burgess & Morgan, Ltd in New York City. In 1930 he was commuting to NYC and living in Darien, Connecticut with his wife Else and 2 children.

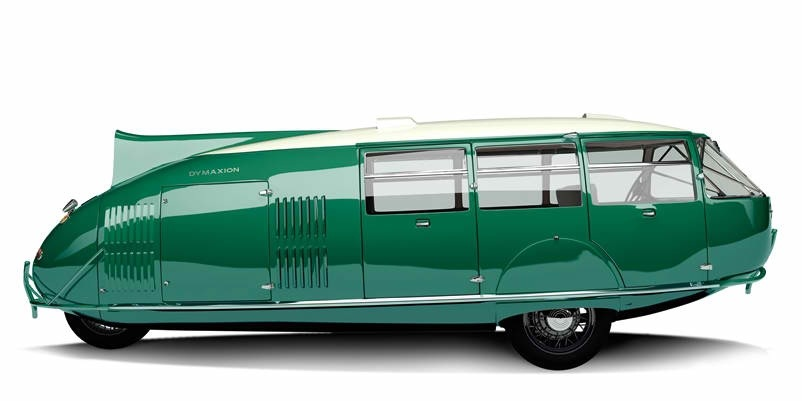
Burgess assisted with the design of Dymaxion Car

Burgess was friends with Buckminster Fuller and helped him in designing and building his aluminum Dymaxion car.

In 1935 he became a consulting naval architect for the Aluminum Company of America with his office at the Bath Iron Works, where he promoted the use of corrosion resistant alloys for ships. He designed the Alumette which was built at the Bath Iron Works. He also designed the sailing yacht Ranger with aluminum masts for Harold Stirling Vanderbilt and he worked closely with Geerd Hendel.

During World War II he was employed as a civilian engineer and worked for the Anti-Submarine Development Detachment of the US Atlantic Fleet. In 1946 he was working at the Stevens Institute of Technology on damage control research.

He died on 19 March 1947 at his home in Hoboken, New Jersey. Burgess was inducted into the National Sailing Hall of Fame in 2013.

== Possible authorship of Times New Roman ==
Former head of typographic development at Mergenthaler Linotype Mike Parker has argued that Burgess originally drew the typeface that would become Times New Roman around 1904. This claim is controversial, with the biographer of Stanley Morison, who is typically considered the co-designer of the typeface along with Victor Lardent, claiming that the theory is based on a fabrication. In 2009, Parker released Starling, a typeface based upon Burgess' alleged drawings housed at the Smithsonian Institution.

== Marriages ==
Burgess married five times. His first marriage was to Helene Adams Willard (1882–1902) in 1901. Helene, who had spina bifida, committed suicide the following year. Burgess published a volume of poetry in response to this tragedy, "The Eternal Laughter and Other Poems", in 1903, with an introduction by Julian Hawthorne (Nathaniel Hawthorne's son).

In 1904 Burgess married Rosamond Tudor (b. 1878), an artist and granddaughter of Frederic Tudor, immediately following her divorce from one of Burgess' best friends and clients, Alex Higginson. Rosamund Burgess was independent and strong-willed, one of the few American amateurs who gained their engineer's license to operate a steam launch, (Note: The inaccessibility of steam launches to American owners led to the peculiarly American popularity of the naphtha launch.) serving the necessary apprenticeship by firing their boat Ox. Tudor and Burgess had three children: sons Edward (1905–1914), who drowned in Marblehead Harbor June 24, 1914, after falling off their boat and Frederic (1907-1985) and daughter Starling (1915–2008). Starling later became a well known illustrator and children's author under the name of Tasha Tudor. After the couple's divorce in 1925 the children went to live with family friends, Gwen Hawthorne Mikkelson and Michael Mikkelson. Gwen was the daughter of Julian Hawthorne.

Burgess married Else Foss in 1925, closed his office in Boston, and moved to New York. The couple had two children, Diana and Ann.

He subsequently wed Nannie Dale Biddle in 1933. Ms. Biddle was the principal financial backer of the Dymaxion Car project, on which Burgess had been working with Buckminster Fuller.

In 1937, Burgess hired Marjorie Young (1913-2005), a talented designer 35 years his junior. With his encouragement, she designed and built a 25' sloop, "Pomelian" for her own use. Rudder Magazine proclaimed her "the only female naval architect in America" in 1940. the couple worked together on projects for the Navy throughout World War II, and married in 1945. A friend of Ms.Young described Burgess: "With all his brilliance, he is a child, and that is part of his charm. He will not face hard facts, but will hide from them and will love the person who shields him from them."
