= 1934 America's Cup =

Sailing event

15th America's Cup
Defender United States
- Defender club: New York Yacht Club
- Yacht: Rainbow

Challenger United Kingdom
- Challenger club: Royal Yacht Squadron
- Yacht: Endeavour

Competition
- Location: Newport
- 41°29′N 71°19′W
- Dates: 1934
- Rule: Universal Rule, J-class
- Winner: New York Yacht Club
- Score: 4–2

The 1934 America's Cup was the 15th challenge for the Cup. It took place in Newport and consisted of a series of races between the defender Rainbow, entered by a syndicate of New York Yacht Club members headed by Harold S. Vanderbilt, and Endeavour, owned by Sir Thomas Sopwith.

== Background ==
Thomas Sopwith had bought the challenger for the 1930 America's Cup, Shamrock V, after the death of its owner, Sir Thomas Lipton. After sailing the yacht in the 1933 season, Sopwith decided to mount his own challenge for the Cup, and communicated this to the New York Yacht Club. The NYYC accepted the challenge, again to be a competition between J-class yachts, and with a new condition this time that the yachts carry quarters for their crews. In recent contests, the yachts had been practically empty shells, and in the 1930 race in particular, the winning boat, Enterprise had been criticised as a "mechanical boat" because her winches were carried below decks and the crew that worked them were similarly below decks and out of view. Installation of living quarters would bring the action back above deck.

Other changes to the rules this year included:

- challengers no longer had to specify the boat they intended to challenge with ten months ahead of the competition. This meant that if Sopwith's new yacht did not prove superior to other British J-class boats available to him, he would be able to substitute another craft.
- if a boat became disabled during a race, the competitor would still have to finish the course to record a victory. In the previous competition, Enterprise had been criticised for finishing the third race in the series after her competition, Shamrock V was unable to continue sailing. The new rule now required this.

Once again, the winner was to be the winner of the majority of seven races.

Endeavour was towed across the Atlantic by Sopwith's motor yacht Vita, arriving at Newport in late August. Sopwith had already arrived separately and had been given a tour of the defender, Rainbow by its skipper Harold S. Vanderbilt. This tour led to a protest by Sopwith that Rainbow had not followed the spirit of a new rule introduced to the competition that year that yachts should be fitted out with crew accommodations. Below decks, Rainbow was spartan, while Endeavour even carried a bathtub in the captain's cabin. The Cup Committee responded to the protest by allowing Sopwith to strip out large parts of Endeavour's interior prior to racing.

== Competition ==
The first race of the competition was attempted on Saturday, September 15, 15 miles to windward and return. Winds had been very light, and shortly after the yachts rounded the mark, they dropped away even further. The race was eventually abandoned because neither yacht could complete the course within the allowed time limit for the race. When the time limit expired, Rainbow was within a mile of the finish, and nearly a mile ahead of Endeavour.

After that, Endeavour won the first two races by a wide margin, and indeed won a course record on the second race, with Sopwith himself at the helm.

In the third race, Endeavour led the way until the final leg. Vanderbilt, skipper of Rainbow considered the race — and the Cup — lost, and handed the helm over to a member of his afterguard, Sherman Hoyt. Hoyt correctly anticipated how Sopwith would maneuver during this leg, and was able to lure his opponent into losing momentum and the race.

The fourth race proved very eventful and controversial. The two yachts nearly collided at the start line, yet neither signalled a protest. Endeavour went on to establish a lead early in the race, but a poor decision by her navigator allowed Rainbow to take it from her. Realizing what was happening, Sopwith maneuvered hard to try to force Rainbow to give way under the Racing Rules of Sailing. Rainbow's skipper, Vanderbilt, chose not to give way, risking a collision, and also risking disqualification from the race if Sopwith signalled a protest and the Committee upheld it. Sopwith chose to bear away and not risk a collision, but did not signal a protest. Rainbow finished the race more than a minute ahead of Endeavour, but as Endeavour crossed the line and approached the Committee boat, Sopwith hoisted the protest flag. Controversy arose because according to the British rules with which Sopwith was familiar, protests were signalled at the end of the race. However, under American rules, the protest had to be signalled at the time of the incident. For his part, Vanderbilt argued that no collision was imminent and that the two yachts had not come within thirty metres of each other.

After deliberation, the Committee awarded the race to Rainbow, ruling that the near-collision at the start line had been Endeavour's fault, and if any disqualification was to happen, Endeavour should already have been disqualified long before the incident that Sopwith was protesting. This decision was still controversial in 2021, nearly 100 years later.

Rainbow went on to win two more races and successfully defend the Cup.

The results of the four races were:

America's Cup races, September 1934
Date	Course and distance (nautical miles)	Winner	Rainbow's's time	Endeavour's time
September 15	15 miles, windward and return	abandoned		
September 17	15 miles, windward and return	Endeavour	3:40:53	3:38:44
September 18	triangular, 10 miles a side	Endeavour	2:49:52	2:49:01
September 20	15 miles, leeward and return	Rainbow	4:15:00	4:18:25
	triangular, 10 miles a side	Rainbow		
September 24	15 miles, leeward and return	Rainbow	3:34:05	3:38:06
	triangular, 10 miles a side	Rainbow	3:20:05	3:21:00

== Bibliography ==
- Dear, Ian (2004). Enterprise to Endeavour: the J-Class Yachts. London: Adlard Coles Nautical.
- Kemp, P.K. (1937). Racing for the America's Cup. London: Hutchinson.
- Rayner, Ranulf (2022). The Story of the America's Cup 1851–2021. Illustrated by Tim Thompson. Woodbridge: ACC Art Books.
