= Endeavour II (yacht) =

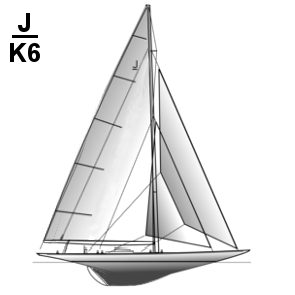
- Class: J-class
- Sail no: K–6
- Designer(s): Charles Ernest Nicholson
- Builder: Camper and Nicholsons
- Launched: 1936
- Fate: Scrapped in 1968

Racing career
- America's Cup: 1937 America's Cup

Endeavour II was a 1936 yacht of the J Class and unsuccessful challenger of the 1937 America's Cup. It was ordered by Thomas Sopwith, designed by Charles Ernest Nicholson and built at Camper and Nicholsons (Yard number 433). Endeavour II was scrapped in 1968.

== Replica ==
A replica, Hanuman, was launched in 2009 at Royal Huisman. In January 2012 she was reported as being for sale for the first time, with an asking price of €18,000,000. In June 2018 she was listed for sale again. This time with an asking price of €14,800,000.
