= List of 2024 Summer Olympics medal winners =

The programme of the 2024 Summer Olympics featured 329 events in 32 sports, including the 28 "core" Olympic sports contested in 2016 and 2020, and four optional sports that were proposed by the Paris Organising Committee: breaking made its Olympic debut as an optional sport, while skateboarding, sport climbing, and surfing returned from 2020.

== Archery ==
=== Medal table ===
* Host nation (France)

Rank	NOC	Gold	Silver	Bronze	Total
1	South Korea	5	1	1	7
2	France*	0	1	1	2
2	United States	0	1	1	2
4	China	0	1	0	1
4	Germany	0	1	0	1
6	Mexico	0	0	1	1
6	Turkey	0	0	1	1
Totals (7 entries)		5	5	5	15

=== Medalists ===
Event	Gold	Silver	Bronze
Men's individual	Kim Woo-jin; South Korea	Brady Ellison; United States	Lee Woo-seok; South Korea
Men's team	South Korea; Kim Je-deok; Kim Woo-jin; Lee Woo-seok	France; Baptiste Addis; Thomas Chirault; Jean-Charles Valladont	Turkey; Mete Gazoz; Berkim Tümer; Abdullah Yıldırmış
Women's individual	Lim Si-hyeon; South Korea	Nam Su-hyeon; South Korea	Lisa Barbelin; France
Women's team	South Korea; Jeon Hun-young; Lim Si-hyeon; Nam Su-hyeon	China; An Qixuan; Li Jiaman; Yang Xiaolei	Mexico; Ángela Ruiz; Alejandra Valencia; Ana Paula Vázquez
Mixed team	South Korea; Kim Woo-jin; Lim Si-hyeon	Germany; Florian Unruh; Michelle Kroppen	United States; Brady Ellison; Casey Kaufhold

== Artistic swimming ==
=== Medal table ===
* Host nation (France)

Rank	NOC	Gold	Silver	Bronze	Total
1	China	2	0	0	2
2	Great Britain	0	1	0	1
2	United States	0	1	0	1
4	Netherlands	0	0	1	1
4	Spain	0	0	1	1
Totals (5 entries)		2	2	2	6

=== Medalists ===
Event	Gold	Silver	Bronze
Duet	China; Wang Qianyi; Wang Liuyi	Great Britain; Kate Shortman; Isabelle Thorpe	Netherlands; Bregje de Brouwer; Noortje de Brouwer
Team	China; Chang Hao; Feng Yu; Wang Ciyue; Wang Liuyi; Wang Qianyi; Xiang Binxuan; Xiao Yanning; Zhang Yayi	United States; Anita Alvarez; Jaime Czarkowski; Megumi Field; Keana Hunter; Audrey Kwon; Jacklyn Luu; Daniella Ramirez; Ruby Remati	Spain; Txell Ferré; Marina García Polo; Lilou Lluís Valette; Meritxell Mas; Alisa Ozhogina; Paula Ramírez; Iris Tió; Blanca Toledano

== Athletics ==
=== Medal table ===
* Host nation (France)

Rank	NOC	Gold	Silver	Bronze	Total
1	United States	14	11	9	34
2	Kenya	4	2	5	11
3	Canada	3	1	1	5
4	Netherlands	2	1	3	6
5	Spain	2	1	1	4
6	Norway	2	1	0	3
7	Great Britain	1	4	5	10
8	Jamaica	1	3	2	6
9	Ethiopia	1	3	0	4
10	Australia	1	2	4	7
11	Germany	1	2	1	4
12	China	1	1	2	4
13	Belgium	1	1	1	3
14	Bahrain	1	1	0	2
14	Botswana	1	1	0	2
14	Ecuador	1	1	0	2
14	New Zealand	1	1	0	2
14	Saint Lucia	1	1	0	2
14	Uganda	1	1	0	2
20	Ukraine	1	0	2	3
21	Greece	1	0	1	2
22	Dominica	1	0	0	1
22	Dominican Republic	1	0	0	1
22	Japan	1	0	0	1
22	Morocco	1	0	0	1
22	Pakistan	1	0	0	1
22	Sweden	1	0	0	1
28	South Africa	0	2	0	2
29	Italy	0	1	2	3
30	Brazil	0	1	1	2
31	France*	0	1	0	1
31	Hungary	0	1	0	1
31	India	0	1	0	1
31	Lithuania	0	1	0	1
31	Portugal	0	1	0	1
36	Grenada	0	0	2	2
37	Algeria	0	0	1	1
37	Croatia	0	0	1	1
37	Czech Republic	0	0	1	1
37	Poland	0	0	1	1
37	Puerto Rico	0	0	1	1
37	Qatar	0	0	1	1
37	Zambia	0	0	1	1
Totals (43 entries)		48	48	49	145

=== Men's events ===
Event	Gold		Silver		Bronze	
100 metres	Noah Lyles; United States	9.79 (.784) PB	Kishane Thompson; Jamaica	9.79 (.789)	Fred Kerley; United States	9.81 SB
200 metres	Letsile Tebogo; Botswana	19.46 AR	Kenny Bednarek; United States	19.62	Noah Lyles; United States	19.70
400 metres	Quincy Hall; United States	43.40 PB	Matthew Hudson-Smith; Great Britain	43.44 AR	Muzala Samukonga; Zambia	43.74 NR
800 metres	Emmanuel Wanyonyi; Kenya	1:41.19 PB	Marco Arop; Canada	1:41.20 AR	Djamel Sedjati; Algeria	1:41.50
1500 metres	Cole Hocker; United States	3:27.65 OR, AR	Josh Kerr; Great Britain	3:27.79 NR	Yared Nuguse; United States	3:27.80 PB
5000 metres	Jakob Ingebrigtsen; Norway	13:13.66 SB	Ronald Kwemoi; Kenya	13:15.04	Grant Fisher; United States	13:15.13
10,000 metres	Joshua Cheptegei; Uganda	26:43.14 OR	Berihu Aregawi; Ethiopia	26:43.44	Grant Fisher; United States	26:43.46 SB
110 metres hurdles	Grant Holloway; United States	12.99	Daniel Roberts; United States	13.09 (.085)	Rasheed Broadbell; Jamaica	13.09 (.088) SB
400 metres hurdles	Rai Benjamin; United States	46.46 =SB	Karsten Warholm; Norway	47.06	Alison dos Santos; Brazil	47.26
3000 metres steeplechase	Soufiane El Bakkali; Morocco	8:06.05 SB	Kenneth Rooks; United States	8:06.41 PB	Abraham Kibiwot; Kenya	8:06.47 SB
4 × 100 metres relay	Canada; Aaron Brown; Jerome Blake; Brendon Rodney; Andre De Grasse	37.50 SB	South Africa; Bayanda Walaza; Shaun Maswanganyi; Bradley Nkoana; Akani Simbine	37.57 AR	Great Britain; Jeremiah Azu; Louie Hinchliffe; Nethaneel Mitchell-Blake; Zharnel Hughes; Richard Kilty^{[b]}	37.61 SB
4 × 400 metres relay	United States; Christopher Bailey; Vernon Norwood; Bryce Deadmon; Rai Benjamin; Quincy Wilson^{[b]}	2:54.43 OR	Botswana; Bayapo Ndori; Busang Collen Kebinatshipi; Anthony Pesela; Letsile Tebogo	2:54.53 AR	Great Britain; Alex Haydock-Wilson; Matthew Hudson-Smith; Lewis Davey; Charlie Dobson; Samuel Reardon^{[b]} Toby Harries^{[b]}	2:55.83 AR
Marathon	Tamirat Tola; Ethiopia	2:06:26 OR	Bashir Abdi; Belgium	2:06:47	Benson Kipruto; Kenya	2:07:00
20 kilometres walk	Brian Pintado; Ecuador	1:18:55	Caio Bonfim; Brazil	1:19:09	Álvaro Martín; Spain	1:19:11
High jump	Hamish Kerr; New Zealand	2.36 m =AR	Shelby McEwen; United States	2.36 m PB	Mutaz Barsham; Qatar	2.34 m SB
Pole vault	Armand Duplantis; Sweden	6.25 m WR	Sam Kendricks; United States	5.95 m =SB	Emmanouil Karalis; Greece	5.90 m
Long jump	Miltiadis Tentoglou; Greece	8.48 m	Wayne Pinnock; Jamaica	8.36 m	Mattia Furlani; Italy	8.34 m
Triple jump	Jordan Díaz; Spain	17.86 m	Pedro Pichardo; Portugal	17.84 m	Andy Díaz; Italy	17.64 m SB
Shot put	Ryan Crouser; United States	22.90 m SB	Joe Kovacs; United States	22.15 m	Rajindra Campbell; Jamaica	22.15 m
Discus throw	Rojé Stona; Jamaica	70.00 m OR/PB	Mykolas Alekna; Lithuania	69.97 m	Matthew Denny; Australia	69.31 m
Hammer throw	Ethan Katzberg; Canada	84.12 m	Bence Halász; Hungary	79.97 m	Mykhaylo Kokhan; Ukraine	79.39 m
Javelin throw	Arshad Nadeem; Pakistan	92.97 m OR	Neeraj Chopra; India	89.45 m SB	Anderson Peters; Grenada	88.54 m
Decathlon	Markus Rooth; Norway	8796 pts NR	Leo Neugebauer; Germany	8748 pts	Lindon Victor; Grenada	8711 pts SB

=== Women's events ===
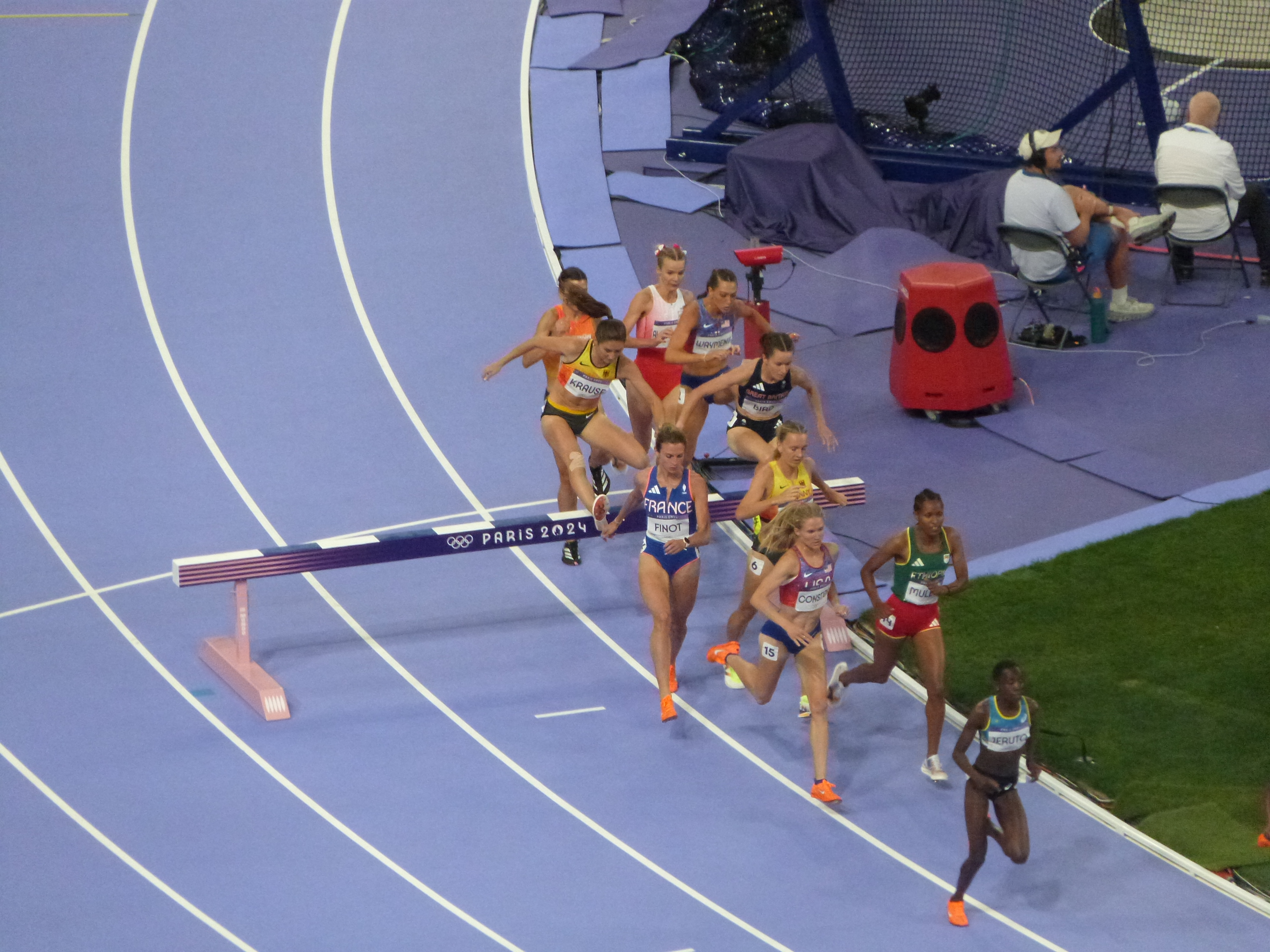
Women's 3000 metres Steeplechase final

Event	Gold		Silver		Bronze	
100 metres	Julien Alfred; Saint Lucia	10.72 NR	Sha'Carri Richardson; United States	10.87	Melissa Jefferson; United States	10.92
200 metres	Gabby Thomas; United States	21.83	Julien Alfred; Saint Lucia	22.08	Brittany Brown; United States	22.20
400 metres	Marileidy Paulino; Dominican Republic	48.17 OR, AR	Salwa Eid Naser; Bahrain	48.53 SB	Natalia Kaczmarek; Poland	48.98
800 metres	Keely Hodgkinson; Great Britain	1:56.72	Tsige Duguma; Ethiopia	1:57.15 PB	Mary Moraa; Kenya	1:57.42
1500 metres	Faith Kipyegon; Kenya	3:51.29 OR	Jessica Hull; Australia	3:52.56	Georgia Bell; Great Britain	3:52.61 NR
5000 metres	Beatrice Chebet; Kenya	14:28.56	Faith Kipyegon; Kenya	14:29.60 SB	Sifan Hassan; Netherlands	14:30.61 SB
10,000 metres	Beatrice Chebet; Kenya	30:43.25	Nadia Battocletti; Italy	30:43.35 NR	Sifan Hassan; Netherlands	30:44.12 SB
100 metres hurdles	Masai Russell; United States	12.33	Cyréna Samba-Mayela; France	12.34	Jasmine Camacho-Quinn; Puerto Rico	12.36
400 metres hurdles	Sydney McLaughlin-Levrone; United States	50.37 WR	Anna Cockrell; United States	51.87 PB	Femke Bol; Netherlands	52.15
3000 metres steeplechase	Winfred Yavi; Bahrain	8:52.76 OR	Peruth Chemutai; Uganda	8:53.34 NR	Faith Cherotich; Kenya	8:55.15 PB
4 × 100 metres relay	United States; Melissa Jefferson; Twanisha Terry; Gabby Thomas; Sha'Carri Richardson	41.78 SB	Great Britain; Dina Asher-Smith; Imani-Lara Lansiquot; Amy Hunt; Daryll Neita; Bianca Williams^{[b]} Desirèe Henry^{[b]}	41.85	Germany; Alexandra Burghardt; Lisa Mayer; Gina Lückenkemper; Rebekka Haase; Sophia Junk^{[b]}	41.97 SB
4 × 400 metres relay	United States; Shamier Little; Sydney McLaughlin-Levrone; Gabby Thomas; Alexis Holmes; Quanera Hayes^{[b]} Aaliyah Butler^{[b]} Kaylyn Brown^{[b]}	3:15.27 AR	Netherlands; Lieke Klaver; Cathelijn Peeters; Lisanne de Witte; Femke Bol; Eveline Saalberg^{[b]} Myrte van der Schoot^{[b]}	3:19.50 NR	Great Britain; Victoria Ohuruogu; Laviai Nielsen; Nicole Yeargin; Amber Anning; Yemi Mary John^{[b]} Hannah Kelly^{[b]} Jodie Williams^{[b]} Lina Nielsen^{[b]}	3:19.72 NR
Marathon	Sifan Hassan; Netherlands	2:22:55 OR	Tigst Assefa; Ethiopia	2:22:58	Hellen Obiri; Kenya	2:23:10 PB
20 kilometres walk	Yang Jiayu; China	1:25:54	María Pérez; Spain	1:26:19	Jemima Montag; Australia	1:26:25 AR
High jump	Yaroslava Mahuchikh; Ukraine	2.00 m	Nicola Olyslagers; Australia	2.00 m	Eleanor Patterson; Australia	1.95 m =SB
High jump	Yaroslava Mahuchikh; Ukraine	2.00 m	Nicola Olyslagers; Australia	2.00 m	Iryna Herashchenko; Ukraine	1.95 m =SB
Pole vault	Nina Kennedy; Australia	4.90 m SB	Katie Moon; United States	4.85 m =SB	Alysha Newman; Canada	4.85 m NR
Long jump	Tara Davis-Woodhall; United States	7.10 m	Malaika Mihambo; Germany	6.98 m	Jasmine Moore; United States	6.96 m
Triple jump	Thea LaFond; Dominica	15.02 m NR	Shanieka Ricketts; Jamaica	14.87 m SB	Jasmine Moore; United States	14.67 m SB
Shot put	Yemisi Ogunleye; Germany	20.00 m	Maddi Wesche; New Zealand	19.86 m PB	Song Jiayuan; China	19.32 m
Discus throw	Valarie Allman; United States	69.50 m	Feng Bin; China	67.51 m	Sandra Elkasević; Croatia	67.51 m SB
Hammer throw	Camryn Rogers; Canada	76.97 m	Annette Echikunwoke; United States	75.48 m SB	Zhao Jie; China	74.27 m
Javelin throw	Haruka Kitaguchi; Japan	65.80 m SB	Jo-Ane van Dyk; South Africa	63.93 m	Nikola Ogrodníková; Czech Republic	63.68 m SB
Heptathlon	Nafissatou Thiam; Belgium	6880 pts	Katarina Johnson-Thompson; Great Britain	6844 pts	Noor Vidts; Belgium	6707 pts

=== Mixed events ===
Event	Gold		Silver		Bronze	
4 × 400 metres relay	Netherlands; Eugene Omalla; Lieke Klaver; Isaya Klein Ikkink; Femke Bol; Cathelijn Peeters^{[b]}	3:07.43 AR	United States; Vernon Norwood; Shamier Little; Bryce Deadmon; Kaylyn Brown	3:07.74	Great Britain; Samuel Reardon; Laviai Nielsen; Alex Haydock-Wilson; Amber Anning; Nicole Yeargin^{[b]}	3:08.01 NR
Marathon walk relay	Spain; Álvaro Martín; María Pérez	2:50:31	Ecuador; Brian Pintado; Glenda Morejón	2:51:22	Australia; Rhydian Cowley; Jemima Montag	2:51:38

^{b} Athletes who participated in the heats only and received medals.

== Badminton ==
=== Medal table ===
* Host nation (France)

Rank	NOC	Gold	Silver	Bronze	Total
1	China	2	3	0	5
2	South Korea	1	1	0	2
3	Chinese Taipei	1	0	0	1
3	Denmark	1	0	0	1
5	Thailand	0	1	0	1
6	Japan	0	0	2	2
6	Malaysia	0	0	2	2
8	Indonesia	0	0	1	1
Totals (8 entries)		5	5	5	15

=== Medalists ===
Event	Gold	Silver	Bronze
Men's singles	Viktor Axelsen; Denmark	Kunlavut Vitidsarn; Thailand	Lee Zii Jia; Malaysia
Men's doubles	Chinese Taipei; Lee Yang; Wang Chi-lin	China; Liang Weikeng; Wang Chang	Malaysia; Aaron Chia; Soh Wooi Yik
Women's singles	An Se-young; South Korea	He Bingjiao; China	Gregoria Mariska Tunjung; Indonesia
Women's doubles	China; Chen Qingchen; Jia Yifan	China; Liu Shengshu; Tan Ning	Japan; Nami Matsuyama; Chiharu Shida
Mixed doubles	China; Zheng Siwei; Huang Yaqiong	South Korea; Kim Won-ho; Jeong Na-eun	Japan; Yuta Watanabe; Arisa Higashino

== Basketball ==
=== Medal table ===
* Host nation (France)

Rank	NOC	Gold	Silver	Bronze	Total
1	United States	2	0	1	3
2	Germany	1	0	0	1
2	Netherlands	1	0	0	1
4	France*	0	3	0	3
5	Spain	0	1	0	1
6	Australia	0	0	1	1
6	Lithuania	0	0	1	1
6	Serbia	0	0	1	1
Totals (8 entries)		4	4	4	12

=== Medalists ===
Event	Gold	Silver	Bronze
Men	United States; Bam Adebayo; Devin Booker; Stephen Curry; Anthony Davis; Kevin Durant; Anthony Edwards; Joel Embiid; Tyrese Haliburton; Jrue Holiday; LeBron James; Jayson Tatum; Derrick White	France; Andrew Albicy; Nicolas Batum; Isaïa Cordinier; Bilal Coulibaly; Nando de Colo; Evan Fournier; Rudy Gobert; Mathias Lessort; Frank Ntilikina; Matthew Strazel; Victor Wembanyama; Guerschon Yabusele	Serbia; Aleksa Avramović; Bogdan Bogdanović; Dejan Davidovac; Ognjen Dobrić; Marko Gudurić; Nikola Jokić; Nikola Jović; Vanja Marinković; Vasilije Micić; Nikola Milutinov; Filip Petrušev; Uroš Plavšić
Women	United States; Napheesa Collier; Kahleah Copper; Chelsea Gray; Brittney Griner; Sabrina Ionescu; Jewell Loyd; Kelsey Plum; Breanna Stewart; Diana Taurasi; Alyssa Thomas; A'ja Wilson; Jackie Young	France; Valériane Ayayi; Marième Badiane; Romane Bernies; Alexia Chery; Marine Fauthoux; Marine Johannès; Leïla Lacan; Dominique Malonga; Sarah Michel; Iliana Rupert; Janelle Salaün; Gabby Williams	Australia; Amy Atwell; Isobel Borlase; Cayla George; Lauren Jackson; Tess Madgen; Ezi Magbegor; Jade Melbourne; Alanna Smith; Stephanie Talbot; Marianna Tolo; Kristy Wallace; Sami Whitcomb
Men 3x3	Netherlands; Jan Driessen; Dimeo van der Horst; Arvin Slagter; Worthy de Jong	France; Lucas Dussoulier; Timothé Vergiat; Jules Rambaut; Franck Seguela	Lithuania; Šarūnas Vingelis; Gintautas Matulis; Aurelijus Pukelis; Evaldas Džiaugys
Women 3x3	Germany; Marie Reichert; Elisa Mevius; Sonja Greinacher; Svenja Brunckhorst	Spain; Vega Gimeno; Sandra Ygueravide; Juana Camilión; Gracia Alonso de Armiño	United States; Dearica Hamby; Cierra Burdick; Hailey Van Lith; Rhyne Howard

== Boxing ==
=== Medal table ===
* Host nation (France)

Rank	NOC	Gold	Silver	Bronze	Total
1	Uzbekistan	5	0	0	5
2	China	3	2	0	5
3	Chinese Taipei	1	0	2	3
4	Cuba	1	0	1	2
5	Algeria	1	0	0	1
5	Ireland	1	0	0	1
5	Ukraine	1	0	0	1
8	France*	0	2	1	3
8	Turkey	0	2	1	3
10	Kazakhstan	0	1	1	2
10	Spain	0	1	1	2
12	Azerbaijan	0	1	0	1
12	Kyrgyzstan	0	1	0	1
12	Mexico	0	1	0	1
12	Panama	0	1	0	1
12	Poland	0	1	0	1
17	Australia	0	0	2	2
17	Dominican Republic	0	0	2	2
17	Philippines	0	0	2	2
20	Brazil	0	0	1	1
20	Bulgaria	0	0	1	1
20	Canada	0	0	1	1
20	Cape Verde	0	0	1	1
20	Georgia	0	0	1	1
20	Germany	0	0	1	1
20	Great Britain	0	0	1	1
20	North Korea	0	0	1	1
20	Refugee Olympic Team	0	0	1	1
20	South Korea	0	0	1	1
20	Tajikistan	0	0	1	1
20	Thailand	0	0	1	1
20	United States	0	0	1	1
Totals (32 entries)		13	13	26	52

=== Men's events ===
Event	Gold	Silver	Bronze
Flyweight (51 kg)	Hasanboy Dusmatov; Uzbekistan	Billal Bennama; France	Junior Alcántara; Dominican Republic
Flyweight (51 kg)	Hasanboy Dusmatov; Uzbekistan	Billal Bennama; France	Daniel Varela de Pina; Cape Verde
Featherweight (57 kg)	Abdumalik Khalokov; Uzbekistan	Munarbek Seiitbek Uulu; Kyrgyzstan	Charlie Senior; Australia
Featherweight (57 kg)	Abdumalik Khalokov; Uzbekistan	Munarbek Seiitbek Uulu; Kyrgyzstan	Javier Ibáñez; Bulgaria
Lightweight (63.5) kg	Erislandy Álvarez; Cuba	Sofiane Oumiha; France	Wyatt Sanford; Canada
Lightweight (63.5) kg	Erislandy Álvarez; Cuba	Sofiane Oumiha; France	Lasha Guruli; Georgia
Welterweight (71 kg)	Asadkhuja Muydinkhujaev; Uzbekistan	Marco Verde; Mexico	Omari Jones; United States
Welterweight (71 kg)	Asadkhuja Muydinkhujaev; Uzbekistan	Marco Verde; Mexico	Lewis Richardson; Great Britain
Middleweight (80 kg)	Oleksandr Khyzhniak; Ukraine	Nurbek Oralbay; Kazakhstan	Cristian Pinales; Dominican Republic
Middleweight (80 kg)	Oleksandr Khyzhniak; Ukraine	Nurbek Oralbay; Kazakhstan	Arlen López; Cuba
Heavyweight (92 kg)	Lazizbek Mullojonov; Uzbekistan	Loren Alfonso; Azerbaijan	Enmanuel Reyes; Spain
Heavyweight (92 kg)	Lazizbek Mullojonov; Uzbekistan	Loren Alfonso; Azerbaijan	Davlat Boltaev; Tajikistan
Super heavyweight (+92 kg)	Bakhodir Jalolov; Uzbekistan	Ayoub Ghadfa; Spain	Nelvie Tiafack; Germany
Super heavyweight (+92 kg)	Bakhodir Jalolov; Uzbekistan	Ayoub Ghadfa; Spain	Djamili-Dini Aboudou Moindze; France

=== Women's events ===
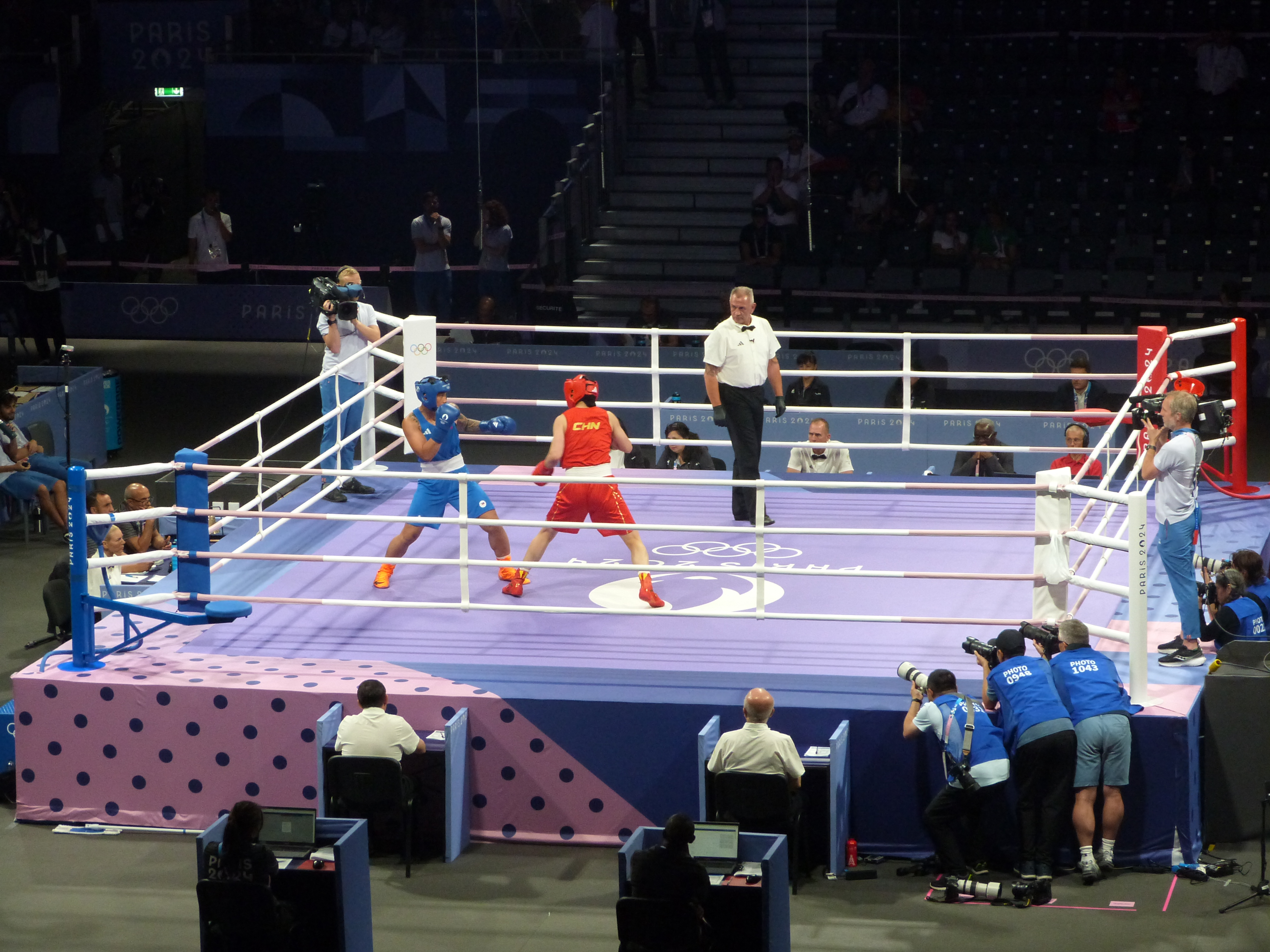
A preliminary fight in the women's 75 kg event

Event	Gold	Silver	Bronze
Flyweight (50 kg)	Wu Yu; China	Buse Naz Çakıroğlu; Turkey	Nazym Kyzaibay; Kazakhstan
Flyweight (50 kg)	Wu Yu; China	Buse Naz Çakıroğlu; Turkey	Aira Villegas; Philippines
Bantamweight (54 kg)	Chang Yuan; China	Hatice Akbaş; Turkey	Pang Chol-mi; North Korea
Bantamweight (54 kg)	Chang Yuan; China	Hatice Akbaş; Turkey	Im Ae-ji; South Korea
Featherweight (57 kg)	Lin Yu-ting; Chinese Taipei	Julia Szeremeta; Poland	Esra Yıldız; Turkey
Featherweight (57 kg)	Lin Yu-ting; Chinese Taipei	Julia Szeremeta; Poland	Nesthy Petecio; Philippines
Lightweight (60 kg)	Kellie Harrington; Ireland	Yang Wenlu; China	Wu Shih-yi; Chinese Taipei
Lightweight (60 kg)	Kellie Harrington; Ireland	Yang Wenlu; China	Beatriz Ferreira; Brazil
Welterweight (66 kg)	Imane Khelif; Algeria	Yang Liu; China	Janjaem Suwannapheng; Thailand
Welterweight (66 kg)	Imane Khelif; Algeria	Yang Liu; China	Chen Nien-chin; Chinese Taipei
Middleweight (75 kg)	Li Qian; China	Atheyna Bylon; Panama	Caitlin Parker; Australia
Middleweight (75 kg)	Li Qian; China	Atheyna Bylon; Panama	Cindy Ngamba; Refugee Olympic Team

== Breaking ==
=== Medal table ===
* Host nation (France)

Rank	NOC	Gold	Silver	Bronze	Total
1	Canada	1	0	0	1
1	Japan	1	0	0	1
3	France*	0	1	0	1
3	Lithuania	0	1	0	1
5	China	0	0	1	1
5	United States	0	0	1	1
Totals (6 entries)		2	2	2	6

=== Medalists ===
The winners were as follows:

Event	Gold	Silver	Bronze
B-Boys	Philip Kim; Phil Wizard; Canada	Danis Civil; Dany Dann; France	Victor Montalvo; Victor; United States
B-Girls	Ami Yuasa; Ami; Japan	Dominika Banevič; Nicka; Lithuania	Liu Qingyi; 671; China

== Canoeing ==
=== Medal table ===
* Host nation (France)

Rank	NOC	Gold	Silver	Bronze	Total
1	New Zealand	4	0	0	4
2	Australia	3	1	1	5
3	Germany	2	2	2	6
4	China	2	0	0	2
4	Czech Republic	2	0	0	2
6	France*	1	2	0	3
7	Italy	1	1	0	2
8	Canada	1	0	1	2
9	Hungary	0	4	3	7
10	Great Britain	0	2	2	4
11	United States	0	1	1	2
12	Brazil	0	1	0	1
12	Poland	0	1	0	1
12	Ukraine	0	1	0	1
15	Spain	0	0	3	3
16	Cuba	0	0	1	1
16	Denmark	0	0	1	1
16	Moldova	0	0	1	1
16	Slovakia	0	0	1	1
Totals (19 entries)		16	16	17	49

=== Slalom ===
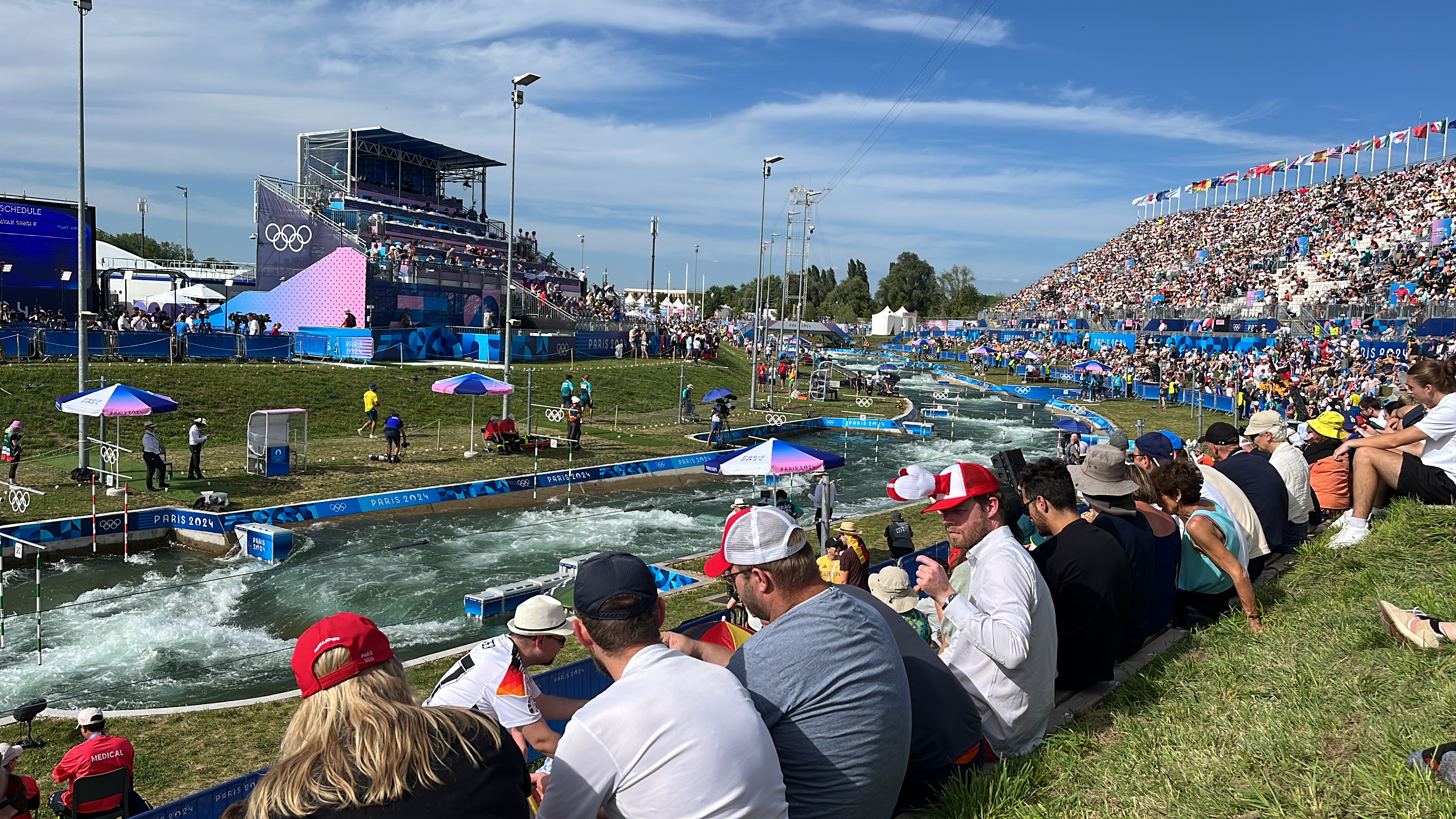
Canoe slalom venue

Event	Gold	Silver	Bronze
Men's C-1	Nicolas Gestin; France	Adam Burgess; Great Britain	Matej Beňuš; Slovakia
Men's K-1	Giovanni De Gennaro; Italy	Titouan Castryck; France	Pau Echaniz; Spain
Men's Kayak cross	Finn Butcher; New Zealand	Joe Clarke; Great Britain	Noah Hegge; Germany
Women's C-1	Jessica Fox; Australia	Elena Lilik; Germany	Evy Leibfarth; United States
Women's K-1	Jessica Fox; Australia	Klaudia Zwolińska; Poland	Kimberley Woods; Great Britain
Women's Kayak cross	Noemie Fox; Australia	Angèle Hug; France	Kimberley Woods; Great Britain

=== Sprint ===
Men

Event	Gold		Silver		Bronze	
C-1 1000 metres	Martin Fuksa; Czech Republic	3:43.16	Isaquias Queiroz; Brazil	3:44.33	Serghei Tarnovschi; Moldova	3:44.68
C-2 500 metres	China; Liu Hao; Ji Bowen	1:39.48	Italy; Gabriele Casadei; Carlo Tacchini	1:41.08	Spain; Joan Antoni Moreno; Diego Domínguez	1:41.18
K-1 1000 metres	Josef Dostál; Czech Republic	3:24.07	Ádám Varga; Hungary	3:24.76	Bálint Kopasz; Hungary	3:25.68
K-2 500 metres	Germany; Jacob Schopf; Max Lemke	1:26.87	Hungary; Bence Nádas; Sándor Tótka	1:27.15	Australia; Jean van der Westhuyzen; Thomas Green	1:27.29
K-4 500 metres	Germany; Max Rendschmidt; Max Lemke; Jacob Schopf; Tom Liebscher	1:19.80	Australia; Riley Fitzsimmons; Pierre van der Westhuyzen; Jackson Collins; Noah Havard	1:19.84	Spain; Saúl Craviotto; Carlos Arévalo; Marcus Cooper Walz; Rodrigo Germade	1:20.05

Women

Event	Gold		Silver		Bronze	
C-1 200 metres	Katie Vincent; Canada	44.12 WB	Nevin Harrison; United States	44.13	Yarisleidis Cirilo; Cuba	44.36
C-2 500 metres	China; Xu Shixiao; Sun Mengya	1:52.81	Ukraine; Liudmyla Luzan; Anastasiia Rybachok	1:54.30	Canada; Sloan MacKenzie; Katie Vincent	1:54.36
K-1 500 metres	Lisa Carrington; New Zealand	1:47.36 OB	Tamara Csipes; Hungary	1:48.44	Emma Jørgensen; Denmark	1:49.76
K-2 500 metres	New Zealand; Lisa Carrington; Alicia Hoskin	1:37.28	Hungary; Tamara Csipes; Alida Dóra Gazsó	1:39.39	Germany; Paulina Paszek; Jule Hake	1:39.46
K-2 500 metres	New Zealand; Lisa Carrington; Alicia Hoskin	1:37.28	Hungary; Tamara Csipes; Alida Dóra Gazsó	1:39.39	Hungary; Noémi Pupp; Sára Fojt	1:39.46
K-4 500 metres	New Zealand; Lisa Carrington; Alicia Hoskin; Olivia Brett; Tara Vaughan	1:32.20	Germany; Paulina Paszek; Jule Hake; Pauline Jagsch; Sarah Brüßler	1:32.62	Hungary; Noémi Pupp; Sára Fojt; Tamara Csipes; Alida Dóra Gazsó	1:32.93

== Cycling ==
=== Medal table ===
* Host nation (France)

Rank	NOC	Gold	Silver	Bronze	Total
1	France*	3	3	3	9
2	Netherlands	3	3	1	7
3	Australia	3	2	3	8
4	United States	3	2	1	6
5	Great Britain	2	5	4	11
6	New Zealand	2	2	1	5
7	Belgium	2	0	3	5
8	Italy	1	2	1	4
9	Portugal	1	1	0	2
10	Argentina	1	0	0	1
10	China	1	0	0	1
12	Germany	0	1	1	2
13	Poland	0	1	0	1
14	Denmark	0	0	1	1
14	South Africa	0	0	1	1
14	Sweden	0	0	1	1
14	Switzerland	0	0	1	1
Totals (17 entries)		22	22	22	66

=== Road cycling ===
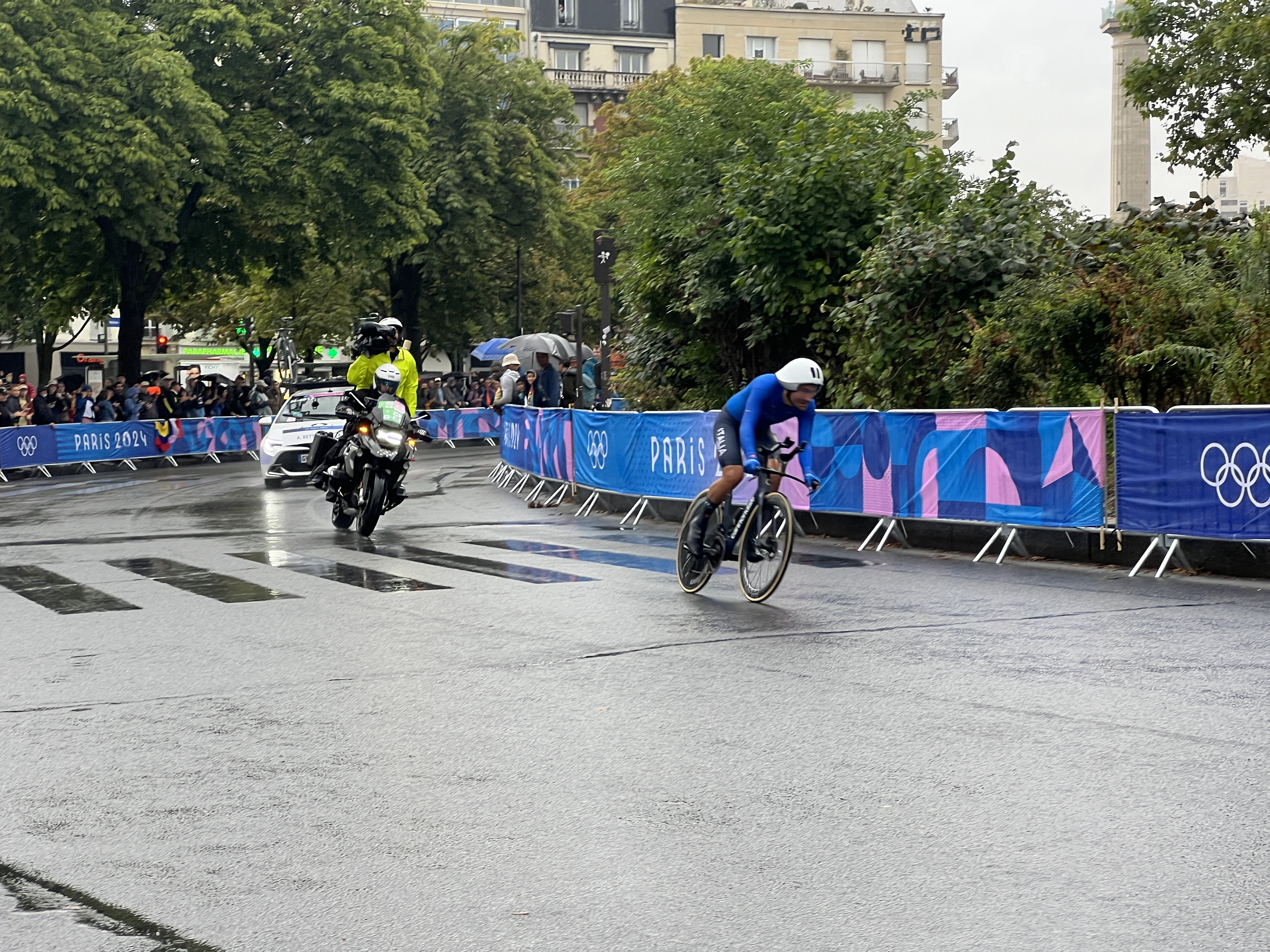
During the time trial

Event	Gold	Silver	Bronze
Men's road race	Remco Evenepoel; Belgium	Valentin Madouas; France	Christophe Laporte; France
Men's time trial	Remco Evenepoel; Belgium	Filippo Ganna; Italy	Wout van Aert; Belgium
Women's road race	Kristen Faulkner; United States	Marianne Vos; Netherlands	Lotte Kopecky; Belgium
Women's time trial	Grace Brown; Australia	Anna Henderson; Great Britain	Chloé Dygert; United States

=== Track cycling ===
==== Men's ====
Event	Gold	Silver	Bronze
Sprint	Harrie Lavreysen; Netherlands	Matthew Richardson; Australia	Jack Carlin; Great Britain
Team sprint	Netherlands; Roy van den Berg; Harrie Lavreysen; Jeffrey Hoogland	Great Britain; Ed Lowe; Hamish Turnbull; Jack Carlin	Australia; Leigh Hoffman; Matthew Richardson; Matthew Glaetzer
Keirin	Harrie Lavreysen; Netherlands	Matthew Richardson; Australia	Matthew Glaetzer; Australia
Madison	Portugal; Iúri Leitão; Rui Oliveira	Italy; Simone Consonni; Elia Viviani	Denmark; Niklas Larsen; Michael Mørkøv
Omnium	Benjamin Thomas; France	Iúri Leitão; Portugal	Fabio Van den Bossche; Belgium
Team pursuit	Australia; Oliver Bleddyn; Sam Welsford; Conor Leahy; Kelland O'Brien	Great Britain; Ethan Hayter; Daniel Bigham; Charlie Tanfield; Ethan Vernon; Oliver Wood	Italy; Simone Consonni; Filippo Ganna; Francesco Lamon; Jonathan Milan

==== Women's ====
Event	Gold	Silver	Bronze
Sprint	Ellesse Andrews; New Zealand	Lea Friedrich; Germany	Emma Finucane; Great Britain
Team sprint	Great Britain; Katy Marchant; Sophie Capewell; Emma Finucane	New Zealand; Rebecca Petch; Shaane Fulton; Ellesse Andrews	Germany; Pauline Grabosch; Emma Hinze; Lea Sophie Friedrich
Keirin	Ellesse Andrews; New Zealand	Hetty van de Wouw; Netherlands	Emma Finucane; Great Britain
Madison	Italy; Chiara Consonni; Vittoria Guazzini	Great Britain; Elinor Barker; Neah Evans	Netherlands; Maike van der Duin; Lisa van Belle
Omnium	Jennifer Valente; United States	Daria Pikulik; Poland	Ally Wollaston; New Zealand
Team pursuit	United States; Jennifer Valente; Lily Williams; Chloé Dygert; Kristen Faulkner	New Zealand; Ally Wollaston; Bryony Botha; Emily Shearman; Nicole Shields	Great Britain; Elinor Barker; Josie Knight; Anna Morris; Jessica Roberts

=== Mountain biking ===
Event	Gold	Silver	Bronze
Men's cross-country	Tom Pidcock; Great Britain	Victor Koretzky; France	Alan Hatherly; South Africa
Women's cross-country	Pauline Ferrand-Prévot; France	Haley Batten; United States	Jenny Rissveds; Sweden

=== BMX ===
Event	Gold	Silver	Bronze
Men's race	Joris Daudet; France	Sylvain André; France	Romain Mahieu; France
Women's race	Saya Sakakibara; Australia	Manon Veenstra; Netherlands	Zoé Claessens; Switzerland
Men's freestyle	José Torres; Argentina	Kieran Reilly; Great Britain	Anthony Jeanjean; France
Women's freestyle	Deng Yawen; China	Perris Benegas; United States	Natalya Diehm; Australia

== Diving ==
=== Medal table ===
* Host nation (France)

Rank	NOC	Gold	Silver	Bronze	Total
1	China	8	2	1	11
2	Great Britain	0	1	4	5
3	Mexico	0	1	1	2
3	North Korea	0	1	1	2
5	Australia	0	1	0	1
5	Japan	0	1	0	1
5	United States	0	1	0	1
8	Canada	0	0	1	1
Totals (8 entries)		8	8	8	24

=== Men's events ===
Event	Gold	Silver	Bronze
3 m springboard	Xie Siyi; China	Wang Zongyuan; China	Osmar Olvera; Mexico
10 m platform	Cao Yuan; China	Rikuto Tamai; Japan	Noah Williams; Great Britain
Synchronized 3 m springboard	China; Wang Zongyuan; Long Daoyi	Mexico; Juan Celaya; Osmar Olvera	Great Britain; Anthony Harding; Jack Laugher
Synchronized 10 m platform	China; Yang Hao; Lian Junjie	Great Britain; Tom Daley; Noah Williams	Canada; Rylan Wiens; Nathan Zsombor-Murray

=== Women's events ===
Event	Gold	Silver	Bronze
3 m springboard	Chen Yiwen; China	Maddison Keeney; Australia	Chang Yani; China
10 m platform	Quan Hongchan; China	Chen Yuxi; China	Kim Mi-rae; North Korea
Synchronized 3 m springboard	China; Chen Yiwen; Chang Yani	United States; Sarah Bacon; Kassidy Cook	Great Britain; Yasmin Harper; Scarlett Mew Jensen
Synchronized 10 m platform	China; Chen Yuxi; Quan Hongchan	North Korea; Kim Mi-rae; Jo Jin-mi	Great Britain; Andrea Spendolini-Sirieix; Lois Toulson

== Equestrian events ==
The medal table was dominated by Germany and Great Britain, taking all six gold medals and 10 of a possible 18 medals in total between them.

=== Medal table ===
* Host nation (France)

Rank	NOC	Gold	Silver	Bronze	Total
1	Germany	4	1	0	5
2	Great Britain	2	0	3	5
3	France*	0	1	1	2
4	Australia	0	1	0	1
4	Denmark	0	1	0	1
4	Switzerland	0	1	0	1
4	United States	0	1	0	1
8	Japan	0	0	1	1
8	Netherlands	0	0	1	1
Totals (9 entries)		6	6	6	18

=== Medalists ===
Games	Gold	Silver	Bronze
Individual dressage	Jessica von Bredow-Werndl on TSF Dalera BB; Germany	Isabell Werth on Wendy; Germany	Charlotte Fry on Glamourdale; Great Britain
Team dressage	Germany; Frederic Wandres on Bluetooth Old; Isabell Werth on Wendy; Jessica von Bredow-Werndl on TSF Dalera BB	Denmark; Daniel Bachmann Andersen on Vayron; Nanna Merrald Rasmussen on Zepter; Cathrine Laudrup-Dufour on Freestyle	Great Britain; Becky Moody on Jagerbomb; Carl Hester on Fame; Charlotte Fry on Glamourdale
Individual eventing	Michael Jung on Chipmunk Frh; Germany	Christopher Burton on Shadow Man; Australia	Laura Collett on London 52; Great Britain
Team eventing	Great Britain; Rosalind Canter on Lordships Graffalo; Tom McEwen on Jl Dublin; Laura Collett on London 52	France; Nicolas Touzaint on Diabolo Menthe; Karim Laghouag on Triton Fontaine; Stéphane Landois on Chaman Dumontceau	Japan; Toshiyuki Tanaka on Jefferson; Kazuma Tomoto on Vinci De La Vigne; Yoshiaki Oiwa on Mgh Grafton Street; Ryuzo Kitajima on Cekatinka
Individual jumping	Christian Kukuk on Checker 47; Germany	Steve Guerdat on Dynamix de Belheme; Switzerland	Maikel van der Vleuten on Beauville Z Netherlands
Team jumping	Great Britain; Ben Maher on Dallas Vegas Batilly; Harry Charles on Romeo 88; Scott Brash on Jefferson	United States; Laura Kraut on Baloutinue; Karl Cook on Caracole de la Roque; McLain Ward on Ilex	France; Simon Delestre on I.Alemusina R 51; Olivier Perreau on Dorai D'Aiguilly; Julien Epaillard on Dubai du Cèdre

== Fencing ==
=== Medal table ===
* Host nation (France)

Rank	NOC	Gold	Silver	Bronze	Total
1	Japan	2	1	2	5
2	United States	2	1	1	4
3	South Korea	2	1	0	3
4	Hong Kong	2	0	0	2
5	France*	1	4	2	7
6	Italy	1	3	1	5
7	Hungary	1	1	1	3
8	Ukraine	1	0	1	2
9	Tunisia	0	1	0	1
10	Canada	0	0	1	1
10	Czech Republic	0	0	1	1
10	Egypt	0	0	1	1
10	Poland	0	0	1	1
Totals (13 entries)		12	12	12	36

=== Men's events ===
Event	Gold	Silver	Bronze
Individual épée	Koki Kano; Japan	Yannick Borel; France	Mohamed El-Sayed; Egypt
Team épée	Hungary; Máté Tamás Koch; Tibor Andrásfi; Gergely Siklósi; Dávid Nagy	Japan; Akira Komata; Koki Kano; Masaru Yamada; Kazuyasu Minobe	Czech Republic; Jiří Beran; Jakub Jurka; Martin Rubeš; Michal Čupr
Individual foil	Cheung Ka Long; Hong Kong	Filippo Macchi; Italy	Nick Itkin; United States
Team foil	Japan; Kyosuke Matsuyama; Takahiro Shikine; Kazuki Iimura; Yudai Nagano	Italy; Guillaume Bianchi; Filippo Macchi; Tommaso Marini; Alessio Foconi	France; Maximilien Chastanet; Maxime Pauty; Enzo Lefort; Julien Mertine
Individual sabre	Oh Sang-uk; South Korea	Farès Ferjani; Tunisia	Luigi Samele; Italy
Team sabre	South Korea; Gu Bon-gil; Oh Sang-uk; Park Sang-won; Do Gyeong-dong	Hungary; Csanád Gémesi; András Szatmári; Áron Szilágyi; Krisztián Rabb	France; Sébastien Patrice; Maxime Pianfetti; Boladé Apithy; Jean-Philippe Patrice

=== Women's events ===
Event	Gold	Silver	Bronze
Individual épée	Vivian Kong; Hong Kong	Auriane Mallo-Breton; France	Eszter Muhari; Hungary
Team épée	Italy; Rossella Fiamingo; Mara Navarria; Giulia Rizzi; Alberta Santuccio	France; Marie-Florence Candassamy; Alexandra Louis-Marie; Auriane Mallo-Breton; Coraline Vitalis	Poland; Aleksandra Jarecka; Alicja Klasik; Renata Knapik-Miazga; Martyna Swatowska-Wenglarczyk
Individual foil	Lee Kiefer; United States	Lauren Scruggs; United States	Eleanor Harvey; Canada
Team foil	United States; Jacqueline Dubrovich; Lee Kiefer; Lauren Scruggs; Maia Weintraub	Italy; Arianna Errigo; Martina Favaretto; Alice Volpi; Francesca Palumbo	Japan; Sera Azuma; Yuka Ueno; Karin Miyawaki; Komaki Kikuchi
Individual sabre	Manon Apithy-Brunet; France	Sara Balzer; France	Olga Kharlan; Ukraine
Team sabre	Ukraine; Yuliya Bakastova; Alina Komashchuk; Olga Kharlan; Olena Kravatska	South Korea; Choi Se-bin; Jeon Ha-young; Jeon Eun-hye; Yoon Ji-su	Japan; Risa Takashima; Seri Ozaki; Misaki Emura; Shihomi Fukushima

== Field hockey ==
=== Medal table ===
* Host nation (France)

Rank	Nation	Gold	Silver	Bronze	Total
1	Netherlands	2	0	0	2
2	China	0	1	0	1
2	Germany	0	1	0	1
4	Argentina	0	0	1	1
4	India	0	0	1	1
Totals (5 entries)		2	2	2	6

=== Medalists ===
Event	Gold	Silver	Bronze
Men	Netherlands; Thierry Brinkman; Jip Janssen; Lars Balk; Jonas de Geus; Thijs van Dam; Seve van Ass; Jorrit Croon; Justen Blok; Derck de Vilder; Floris Wortelboer; Tjep Hoedemakers; Koen Bijen; Joep de Mol; Pirmin Blaak; Tijmen Reyenga; Duco Telgenkamp; Floris Middendorp; Steijn van Heijningen	Germany; Mats Grambusch; Mathias Müller; Lukas Windfeder; Niklas Wellen; Johannes Große; Thies Prinz; Paul-Philipp Kaufmann; Teo Hinrichs; Tom Grambusch; Gonzalo Peillat; Christopher Rühr; Justus Weigand; Marco Miltkau; Martin Zwicker; Hannes Müller; Malte Hellwig; Moritz Ludwig; Jean Danneberg	India; Harmanpreet Singh; Jarmanpreet Singh; Abhishek Nain; Manpreet Singh; Hardik Singh; Gurjant Singh; Sanjay; Mandeep Singh; Lalit Upadhyay; P. R. Sreejesh; Sumit Walmiki; Shamsher Singh; Raj Kumar Pal; Amit Rohidas; Vivek Prasad; Sukhjeet Singh
Women	Netherlands; Xan de Waard; Anne Veenendaal; Luna Fokke; Freeke Moes; Lisa Post; Yibbi Jansen; Renée van Laarhoven; Felice Albers; Maria Verschoor; Sanne Koolen; Frédérique Matla; Joosje Burg; Marleen Jochems; Pien Sanders; Marijn Veen; Laura Nunnink; Pien Dicke	China; Ou Zixia; Ye Jiao; Gu Bingfeng; Yang Liu; Zhang Ying; Chen Yi; Ma Ning; Li Hong; Dan Wen; Zou Meirong; He Jiangxin; Fan Yunxia; Chen Yang; Xu Wenyu; Zhong Jiaqi; Tan Jinzhuang; Yu Anhui	Argentina; Rocío Sánchez Moccia; Sofía Toccalino; Agustina Gorzelany; Valentina Raposo; Agostina Alonso; Agustina Albertario; María José Granatto; Cristina Cosentino; Victoria Sauze; Sofía Cairó; Eugenia Trinchinetti; Lara Casas; Juana Castellaro; Pilar Campoy; Julieta Jankunas; Zoe Díaz

== Football ==
=== Medal table ===
* Host nation (France)

Rank	NOC	Gold	Silver	Bronze	Total
1	Spain	1	0	0	1
1	United States	1	0	0	1
3	Brazil	0	1	0	1
3	France*	0	1	0	1
5	Germany	0	0	1	1
5	Morocco	0	0	1	1
Totals (6 entries)		2	2	2	6

=== Medalists ===
Event	Gold	Silver	Bronze
Men	Spain (ESP); Álex Baena; Pablo Barrios; Adrián Bernabé; Sergio Camello; Pau Cubarsí; Eric García; Joan García; Sergio Gómez; Miguel Gutiérrez; Alejandro Iturbe; Diego López; Fermín López; Juan Miranda; Cristhian Mosquera; Samu Omorodion; Aimar Oroz; Jon Pacheco; Marc Pubill; Abel Ruiz; Juanlu Sánchez; Arnau Tenas; Beñat Turrientes	France (FRA); Maghnes Akliouche; Loïc Badé; Rayan Cherki; Joris Chotard; Andy Diouf; Désiré Doué; Arnaud Kalimuendo; Manu Koné; Alexandre Lacazette; Johann Lepenant; Bradley Locko; Castello Lukeba; Soungoutou Magassa; Jean-Philippe Mateta; Chrislain Matsima; Enzo Millot; Obed Nkambadio; Michael Olise; Guillaume Restes; Kiliann Sildillia; Adrien Truffert	Morocco (MAR); Ilias Akhomach; Eliesse Ben Seghir; Benjamin Bouchouari; Mehdi Boukamir; Oussama El Azzouzi; Bilal El Khannous; Zakaria El Ouahdi; Abde Ezzalzouli; Rachid Ghanimi; Achraf Hakimi; Yassine Kechta; Haytam Manaout; El Mehdi Maouhoub; Munir Mohamedi; Akram Nakach; Soufiane Rahimi; Amir Richardson; Adil Tahif; Oussama Targhalline
Women	United States (USA); Korbin Albert; Croix Bethune; Sam Coffey; Tierna Davidson; Crystal Dunn; Emily Fox; Naomi Girma; Lindsey Horan; Casey Krueger; Rose Lavelle; Casey Murphy; Alyssa Naeher; Jenna Nighswonger; Trinity Rodman; Emily Sams; Jaedyn Shaw; Sophia Smith; Emily Sonnett; Mallory Swanson; Lynn Williams	Brazil (BRA); Adriana; Ana Vitória; Antônia; Angelina; Duda Sampaio; Gabi Nunes; Gabi Portilho; Jheniffer; Kerolin; Lauren; Lorena; Luciana; Ludmila; Marta; Priscila; Rafaelle Souza; Tainá; Tamires; Tarciane; Thaís; Vitória Yaya; Yasmim	Germany (GER); Nicole Anyomi; Ann-Katrin Berger; Jule Brand; Klara Bühl; Sara Doorsoun; Vivien Endemann; Laura Freigang; Merle Frohms; Giulia Gwinn; Marina Hegering; Kathrin Hendrich; Sarai Linder; Sydney Lohmann; Janina Minge; Sjoeke Nüsken; Alexandra Popp; Felicitas Rauch; Lea Schüller; Bibiane Schulze; Elisa Senß

== Golf ==
=== Medal table ===
* Host nation (France)

Rank	NOC	Gold	Silver	Bronze	Total
1	New Zealand	1	0	0	1
1	United States	1	0	0	1
3	Germany	0	1	0	1
3	Great Britain	0	1	0	1
5	China	0	0	1	1
5	Japan	0	0	1	1
Totals (6 entries)		2	2	2	6

=== Medalists ===
Event	Gold	Silver	Bronze
Men's individual	Scottie Scheffler; United States	Tommy Fleetwood; Great Britain	Hideki Matsuyama; Japan
Women's individual	Lydia Ko; New Zealand	Esther Henseleit; Germany	Lin Xiyu; China

== Gymnastics ==
=== Medal table ===
* Host nation (France)

Rank	NOC	Gold	Silver	Bronze	Total
1	China	3	6	3	12
2	United States	3	1	5	9
3	Japan	3	0	1	4
4	Philippines	2	0	0	2
5	Brazil	1	2	1	4
6	Italy	1	1	3	5
–	Individual Neutral Athletes	1	1	0	2
7	Great Britain	1	0	2	3
8	Algeria	1	0	0	1
8	Germany	1	0	0	1
8	Ireland	1	0	0	1
11	Israel	0	2	0	2
12	Armenia	0	1	0	1
12	Bulgaria	0	1	0	1
12	Colombia	0	1	0	1
12	Kazakhstan	0	1	0	1
12	Ukraine	0	1	0	1
17	Canada	0	0	1	1
17	Chinese Taipei	0	0	1	1
17	Greece	0	0	1	1
17	Romania	0	0	1	1
Totals (20 entries)		18	18	19	55

=== Artistic gymnastics ===
==== Men ====
Games	Gold	Silver	Bronze
Team all-around	Japan; Daiki Hashimoto; Kaya Kazuma; Shinnosuke Oka; Takaaki Sugino; Wataru Tanigawa	China; Liu Yang; Su Weide; Xiao Ruoteng; Zhang Boheng; Zou Jingyuan	United States; Asher Hong; Paul Juda; Brody Malone; Stephen Nedoroscik; Fred Richard
Individual all-around	Shinnosuke Oka; Japan	Zhang Boheng; China	Xiao Ruoteng; China
Floor exercise	Carlos Yulo; Philippines	Artem Dolgopyat; Israel	Jake Jarman; Great Britain
Pommel horse	Rhys McClenaghan; Ireland	Nariman Kurbanov; Kazakhstan	Stephen Nedoroscik; United States
Rings	Liu Yang; China	Zou Jingyuan; China	Eleftherios Petrounias; Greece
Vault	Carlos Yulo; Philippines	Artur Davtyan; Armenia	Harry Hepworth; Great Britain
Parallel bars	Zou Jingyuan; China	Illia Kovtun; Ukraine	Shinnosuke Oka; Japan
Horizontal bar	Shinnosuke Oka; Japan	Ángel Barajas; Colombia	Zhang Boheng; China
Horizontal bar	Shinnosuke Oka; Japan	Ángel Barajas; Colombia	Tang Chia-hung; Chinese Taipei

==== Women ====
Games	Gold	Silver	Bronze
Team all-around	United States; Simone Biles; Jade Carey; Jordan Chiles; Sunisa Lee; Hezly Rivera	Italy; Angela Andreoli; Alice D'Amato; Manila Esposito; Elisa Iorio; Giorgia Villa	Brazil; Rebeca Andrade; Jade Barbosa; Lorrane Oliveira; Flávia Saraiva; Júlia Soares
Individual all-around	Simone Biles; United States	Rebeca Andrade; Brazil	Sunisa Lee; United States
Vault	Simone Biles; United States	Rebeca Andrade; Brazil	Jade Carey; United States
Uneven bars	Kaylia Nemour; Algeria	Qiu Qiyuan; China	Sunisa Lee; United States
Balance beam	Alice D'Amato; Italy	Zhou Yaqin; China	Manila Esposito; Italy
Floor exercise	Rebeca Andrade; Brazil	Simone Biles; United States	Ana Bărbosu; Romania

=== Rhythmic gymnastics ===
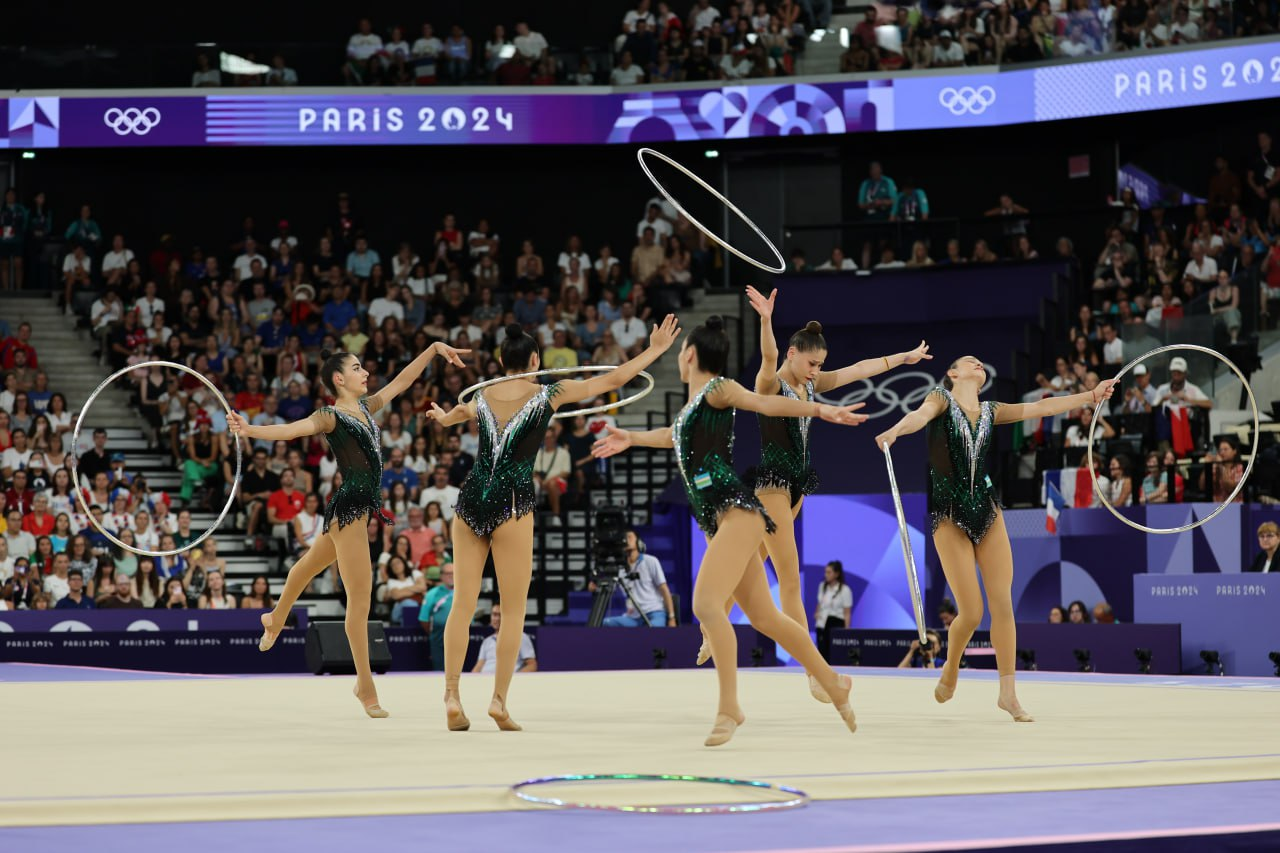
Uzbekistan performing during the group competition

Games	Gold	Silver	Bronze
Group all-around	China; Guo Qiqi; Hao Ting; Huang Zhangjiayang; Wang Lanjing; Ding Xinyi	Israel; Ofir Shaham; Diana Svertsov; Adar Friedmann; Romi Paritzki; Shani Bakanov	Italy; Alessia Maurelli; Martina Centofanti; Agnese Duranti; Daniela Mogurean; Laura Paris
Individual all-around	Darja Varfolomeev; Germany	Boryana Kaleyn; Bulgaria	Sofia Raffaeli; Italy

=== Trampoline ===
Games	Gold	Silver	Bronze
Men's individual	Ivan Litvinovich; Individual Neutral Athletes	Wang Zisai; China	Yan Langyu; China
Women's individual	Bryony Page; Great Britain	Viyaleta Bardzilouskaya; Individual Neutral Athletes	Sophiane Méthot; Canada

== Handball ==
=== Medal table ===
* Host nation (France)

Rank	NOC	Gold	Silver	Bronze	Total
1	Denmark	1	0	1	2
2	Norway	1	0	0	1
3	France*	0	1	0	1
3	Germany	0	1	0	1
5	Spain	0	0	1	1
Totals (5 entries)		2	2	2	6

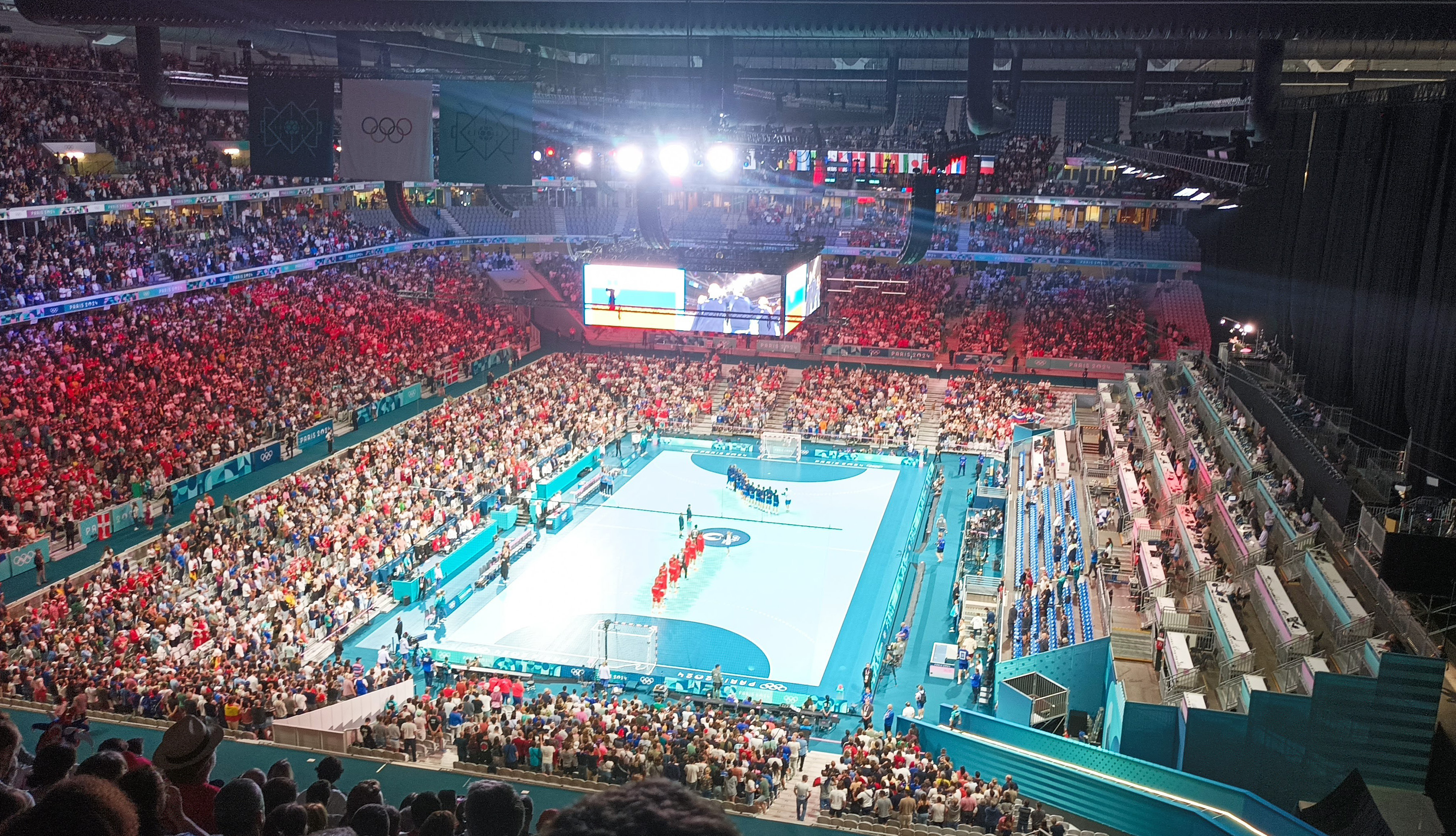
Men's tournament Denmark v. Slovenia, semifinals

=== Medalists ===
Event	Gold	Silver	Bronze
Men	Denmark; Niklas Landin Jacobsen; Niclas Kirkeløkke; Magnus Landin Jacobsen; Emil Jakobsen; Rasmus Lauge; Emil Nielsen; Magnus Saugstrup; Hans Lindberg; Mathias Gidsel; Henrik Møllgaard; Mikkel Hansen; Lukas Jørgensen; Lasse Andersson; Simon Hald; Thomas Sommer Arnoldsen; Simon Pytlick	Germany; David Späth; Johannes Golla; Luca Witzke; Sebastian Heymann; Justus Fischer; Juri Knorr; Julian Köster; Renārs Uščins; Kai Häfner; Tim Hornke; Andreas Wolff; Rune Dahmke; Lukas Mertens; Christoph Steinert; Marko Grgić; Jannik Kohlbacher	Spain; Gonzalo Pérez de Vargas; Jorge Maqueda; Alex Dujshebaev; Rodrigo Corrales; Adrià Figueras; Imanol Garciandia; Abel Serdio; Agustín Casado; Aleix Gómez; Ian Tarrafeta; Miguel Sánchez-Migallón; Daniel Dujshebaev; Kauldi Odriozola; Daniel Fernández; Javier Rodríguez Moreno
Women	Norway; Veronica Kristiansen; Maren Nyland Aardahl; Stine Skogrand; Nora Mørk; Stine Bredal Oftedal; Silje Solberg-Østhassel; Kari Brattset Dale; Kristine Breistøl; Vilde Ingstad; Katrine Lunde; Marit Røsberg Jacobsen; Camilla Herrem; Sanna Solberg-Isaksen; Henny Reistad; Thale Rushfeldt Deila	France; Laura Glauser; Méline Nocandy; Alicia Toublanc; Chloé Valentini; Coralie Lassource; Grâce Zaadi; Cléopatre Darleux; Laura Flippes; Orlane Kanor; Tamara Horacek; Pauletta Foppa; Estelle Nze Minko; Oriane Ondono; Lucie Granier; Sarah Bouktit; Léna Grandveau; Hatadou Sako	Denmark; Sandra Toft; Sarah Iversen; Helena Elver; Anne Mette Hansen; Kathrine Heindahl; Line Haugsted; Althea Reinhardt; Mette Tranborg; Kristina Jørgensen; Trine Østergaard; Louise Burgaard; Mie Højlund; Emma Friis; Rikke Iversen; Michala Møller

== Judo ==
A total of 60 medals were won by 26 NOC's.

=== Medal table ===
* Host nation (France)

Rank	NOC	Gold	Silver	Bronze	Total
1	Japan	3	2	3	8
2	France*	2	2	6	10
3	Azerbaijan	2	0	0	2
4	Georgia	1	2	0	3
5	Brazil	1	1	2	4
6	Uzbekistan	1	0	2	3
7	Kazakhstan	1	0	1	2
8	Canada	1	0	0	1
8	Croatia	1	0	0	1
8	Italy	1	0	0	1
8	Slovenia	1	0	0	1
12	South Korea	0	2	3	5
13	Israel	0	2	1	3
14	Kosovo	0	1	1	2
15	Germany	0	1	0	1
15	Mexico	0	1	0	1
15	Mongolia	0	1	0	1
18	Moldova	0	0	2	2
18	Tajikistan	0	0	2	2
20	Austria	0	0	1	1
20	Belgium	0	0	1	1
20	China	0	0	1	1
20	Greece	0	0	1	1
20	Portugal	0	0	1	1
20	Spain	0	0	1	1
20	Sweden	0	0	1	1
Totals (26 entries)		15	15	30	60

=== Men's events ===
Event	Gold	Silver	Bronze
Extra-lightweight (60 kg)	Yeldos Smetov; Kazakhstan	Luka Mkheidze; France	Ryuju Nagayama; Japan
Extra-lightweight (60 kg)	Yeldos Smetov; Kazakhstan	Luka Mkheidze; France	Francisco Garrigós; Spain
Half-lightweight (66 kg)	Hifumi Abe; Japan	Willian Lima; Brazil	Gusman Kyrgyzbayev; Kazakhstan
Half-lightweight (66 kg)	Hifumi Abe; Japan	Willian Lima; Brazil	Denis Vieru; Moldova
Lightweight (73 kg)	Hidayat Heydarov; Azerbaijan	Joan-Benjamin Gaba; France	Adil Osmanov; Moldova
Lightweight (73 kg)	Hidayat Heydarov; Azerbaijan	Joan-Benjamin Gaba; France	Soichi Hashimoto; Japan
Half-middleweight (81 kg)	Takanori Nagase; Japan	Tato Grigalashvili; Georgia	Lee Joon-hwan; South Korea
Half-middleweight (81 kg)	Takanori Nagase; Japan	Tato Grigalashvili; Georgia	Somon Makhmadbekov; Tajikistan
Middleweight (90 kg)	Lasha Bekauri; Georgia	Sanshiro Murao; Japan	Maxime-Gaël Ngayap Hambou; France
Middleweight (90 kg)	Lasha Bekauri; Georgia	Sanshiro Murao; Japan	Theodoros Tselidis; Greece
Half-heavyweight (100 kg)	Zelym Kotsoiev; Azerbaijan	Ilia Sulamanidze; Georgia	Peter Paltchik; Israel
Half-heavyweight (100 kg)	Zelym Kotsoiev; Azerbaijan	Ilia Sulamanidze; Georgia	Muzaffarbek Turoboyev; Uzbekistan
Heavyweight (+100 kg)	Teddy Riner; France	Kim Min-jong; South Korea	Temur Rakhimov; Tajikistan
Heavyweight (+100 kg)	Teddy Riner; France	Kim Min-jong; South Korea	Alisher Yusupov; Uzbekistan

=== Women's events ===
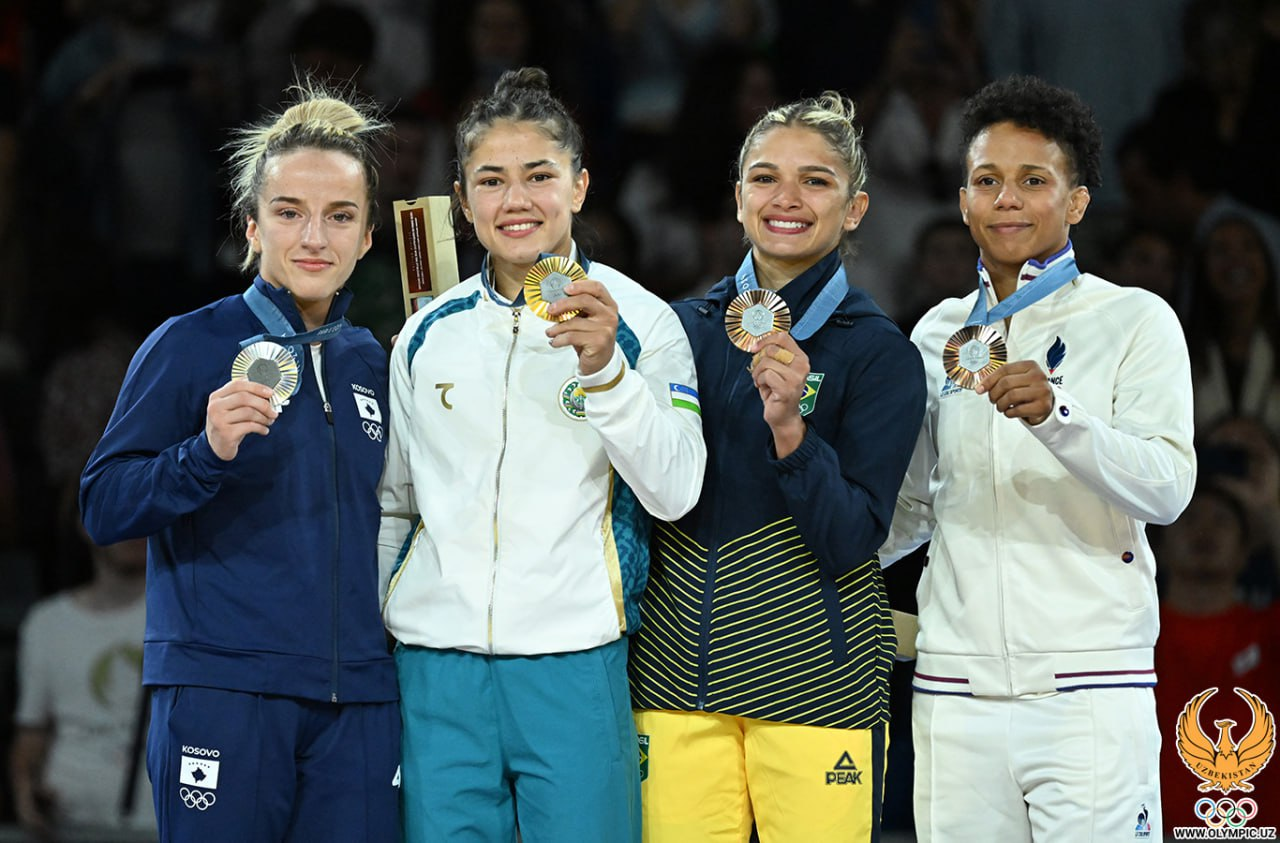
Women's 52 kg medalists

Event	Gold	Silver	Bronze
Extra-lightweight (48 kg)	Natsumi Tsunoda; Japan	Bavuudorjiin Baasankhüü; Mongolia	Shirine Boukli; France
Extra-lightweight (48 kg)	Natsumi Tsunoda; Japan	Bavuudorjiin Baasankhüü; Mongolia	Tara Babulfath; Sweden
Half-lightweight (52 kg)	Diyora Keldiyorova; Uzbekistan	Distria Krasniqi; Kosovo	Larissa Pimenta; Brazil
Half-lightweight (52 kg)	Diyora Keldiyorova; Uzbekistan	Distria Krasniqi; Kosovo	Amandine Buchard; France
Lightweight (57 kg)	Christa Deguchi; Canada	Huh Mi-mi; South Korea	Haruka Funakubo; Japan
Lightweight (57 kg)	Christa Deguchi; Canada	Huh Mi-mi; South Korea	Sarah-Léonie Cysique; France
Half-middleweight (63 kg)	Andreja Leški; Slovenia	Prisca Awiti Alcaraz; Mexico	Clarisse Agbegnenou; France
Half-middleweight (63 kg)	Andreja Leški; Slovenia	Prisca Awiti Alcaraz; Mexico	Laura Fazliu; Kosovo
Middleweight (70 kg)	Barbara Matić; Croatia	Miriam Butkereit; Germany	Michaela Polleres; Austria
Middleweight (70 kg)	Barbara Matić; Croatia	Miriam Butkereit; Germany	Gabriella Willems; Belgium
Half-heavyweight (78 kg)	Alice Bellandi; Italy	Inbar Lanir; Israel	Ma Zhenzhao; China
Half-heavyweight (78 kg)	Alice Bellandi; Italy	Inbar Lanir; Israel	Patrícia Sampaio; Portugal
Heavyweight (+78 kg)	Beatriz Souza; Brazil	Raz Hershko; Israel	Kim Ha-yun; South Korea
Heavyweight (+78 kg)	Beatriz Souza; Brazil	Raz Hershko; Israel	Romane Dicko; France

=== Mixed events ===
Event	Gold	Silver	Bronze
Mixed team	France (FRA); Shirine Boukli; Joan-Benjamin Gaba; Amandine Buchard; Walide Khyar; Sarah-Léonie Cysique; Luka Mkheidze; Clarisse Agbegnenou; Alpha Oumar Djalo; Marie-Ève Gahié; Maxime-Gaël Ngayap Hambou; Romane Dicko; Aurélien Diesse; Madeleine Malonga; Teddy Riner	Japan (JPN); Uta Abe; Hifumi Abe; Haruka Funakubo; Soichi Hashimoto; Natsumi Tsunoda; Ryuju Nagayama; Saki Niizoe; Sanshiro Murao; Miku Takaichi; Takanori Nagase; Aaron Wolf; Rika Takayama; Akira Sone; Tatsuru Saito	Brazil (BRA); Daniel Cargnin; Leonardo Gonçalves; Willian Lima; Rafael Macedo; Guilherme Schimidt; Rafael Silva; Larissa Pimenta; Ketleyn Quadros; Rafaela Silva; Beatriz Souza
Mixed team	France (FRA); Shirine Boukli; Joan-Benjamin Gaba; Amandine Buchard; Walide Khyar; Sarah-Léonie Cysique; Luka Mkheidze; Clarisse Agbegnenou; Alpha Oumar Djalo; Marie-Ève Gahié; Maxime-Gaël Ngayap Hambou; Romane Dicko; Aurélien Diesse; Madeleine Malonga; Teddy Riner	Japan (JPN); Uta Abe; Hifumi Abe; Haruka Funakubo; Soichi Hashimoto; Natsumi Tsunoda; Ryuju Nagayama; Saki Niizoe; Sanshiro Murao; Miku Takaichi; Takanori Nagase; Aaron Wolf; Rika Takayama; Akira Sone; Tatsuru Saito	South Korea (KOR); Lee Hye-kyeong; Kim Won-jin; Jung Ye-rin; An Ba-ul; Huh Mi-mi; Kim Ji-su; Lee Joon-hwan; Han Ju-yeop; Yoon Hyun-ji; Kim Ha-yun; Kim Min-jong

== Modern pentathlon ==
A total of six medals were won by six NOC's.

=== Medal table ===
* Host nation (France)

Rank	NOC	Gold	Silver	Bronze	Total
1	Egypt	1	0	0	1
1	Hungary	1	0	0	1
3	France*	0	1	0	1
3	Japan	0	1	0	1
5	Italy	0	0	1	1
5	South Korea	0	0	1	1
Totals (6 entries)		2	2	2	6

=== Medalists ===
Event	Gold	Silver	Bronze
Men's	Ahmed El-Gendy; Egypt	Taishu Sato; Japan	Giorgio Malan; Italy
Women's	Michelle Gulyás; Hungary	Élodie Clouvel; France	Seong Seung-min; South Korea

== Rowing ==
A total of 42 medals were won by 15 NOC's.

=== Medal table ===
* Host nation (France)

Rank	NOC	Gold	Silver	Bronze	Total
1	Netherlands	4	3	1	8
2	Great Britain	3	2	3	8
3	Romania	2	3	0	5
4	New Zealand	1	2	1	4
5	Germany	1	0	1	2
5	Ireland	1	0	1	2
5	United States	1	0	1	2
8	Croatia	1	0	0	1
9	Italy	0	2	0	2
10	Canada	0	1	0	1
–	Individual Neutral Athletes (Note: Individual Neutral Athletes is the name used to represent approved individual Russian and Belarusian athletes at the 2024 Summer Olympics, after the IOC suspended the Russian Olympic Committee and Belarus Olympic Committee due to the Russian invasion of Ukraine. The IOC country code is AIN, after the French name Athlètes Individuels Neutres.)	0	1	0	1
11	Greece	0	0	2	2
12	Australia	0	0	1	1
12	Lithuania	0	0	1	1
12	Poland	0	0	1	1
12	Switzerland	0	0	1	1
Totals (15 entries)		14	14	14	42

=== Men's events ===
Games	Gold	Silver	Bronze
Single sculls	Oliver Zeidler; Germany	Yauheni Zalaty; Individual Neutral Athletes	Simon van Dorp; Netherlands
Double sculls	Romania; Andrei Cornea; Marian Enache	Netherlands; Melvin Twellaar; Stef Broenink	Ireland; Daire Lynch; Philip Doyle
Quadruple sculls	Netherlands; Lennart van Lierop; Finn Florijn; Tone Wieten; Koen Metsemakers	Italy; Luca Chiumento; Luca Rambaldi; Giacomo Gentili; Andrea Panizza	Poland; Fabian Barański; Mateusz Biskup; Dominik Czaja; Mirosław Ziętarski
Coxless pair	Croatia; Martin Sinković; Valent Sinković	Great Britain; Oliver Wynne-Griffith; Thomas George	Switzerland; Roman Röösli; Andrin Gulich
Coxless four	United States; Nick Mead; Justin Best; Michael Grady; Liam Corrigan	New Zealand; Oliver Maclean; Logan Ullrich; Tom Murray; Matt Macdonald	Great Britain; Oliver Wilkes; David Ambler; Matt Aldridge; Freddie Davidson
Eight	Great Britain; Morgan Bolding; Sholto Carnegie; Rory Gibbs; Thomas Ford; Jacob Dawson; Charles Elwes; Thomas Digby; James Rudkin; Harry Brightmore c	Netherlands; Ralf Rienks; Olav Molenaar; Sander de Graaf; Ruben Knab; Gert-Jan van Doorn; Jacob van de Kerkhof; Jan van der Bij; Mick Makker; Dieuwke Fetter c	United States; Henry Hollingsworth; Nicholas Rusher; Christian Tabash; Clark Dean; Christopher Carlson; Peter Chatain; Evan Olson; Pieter Quinton; Rielly Milne c
Lightweight double sculls	Ireland; Fintan McCarthy; Paul O'Donovan	Italy; Stefano Oppo; Gabriel Soares	Greece; Petros Gkaidatzis; Antonios Papakonstantinou

=== Women's events ===
Games	Gold	Silver	Bronze
Single sculls	Karolien Florijn; Netherlands	Emma Twigg; New Zealand	Viktorija Senkutė; Lithuania
Double sculls	New Zealand; Brooke Francis; Lucy Spoors	Romania; Ancuța Bodnar; Simona Radiș	Great Britain; Mathilda Hodgkins-Byrne; Becky Wilde
Quadruple sculls	Great Britain; Lauren Henry; Hannah Scott; Lola Anderson; Georgina Brayshaw	Netherlands; Laila Youssifou; Bente Paulis; Roos de Jong; Tessa Dullemans	Germany; Maren Völz; Tabea Schendekehl; Leonie Menzel; Pia Greiten
Coxless pair	Netherlands; Ymkje Clevering; Veronique Meester	Romania; Ioana Vrînceanu; Roxana Anghel	Australia; Jessica Morrison; Annabelle McIntyre
Coxless four	Netherlands; Marloes Oldenburg; Hermijntje Drenth; Tinka Offereins; Benthe Boonstra	Great Britain; Helen Glover; Esme Booth; Samantha Redgrave; Rebecca Shorten	New Zealand; Jackie Gowler; Phoebe Spoors; Davina Waddy; Kerri Williams
Eight	Romania; Adriana Adam; Roxana Anghel; Amalia Bereș; Ancuta Bodnar; Maria-Magdalena Rusu; Maria Lehaci; Ioana Vrînceanu; Simona Radiș; Victoria-Ștefania Petreanu c	Canada; Abigail Dent; Caileigh Filmer; Kasia Gruchalla-Wesierski; Maya Meschkuleit; Sydney Payne; Jessica Sevick; Kristina Walker; Avalon Wasteneys; Kristen Kit c	Great Britain; Annie Campbell-Orde; Holly Dunford; Emily Ford; Lauren Irwin; Heidi Long; Rowan McKellar; Eve Stewart; Harriet Taylor; Henry Fieldman c
Lightweight double sculls	Great Britain; Emily Craig; Imogen Grant	Romania; Gianina van Groningen; Ionela Cozmiuc	Greece; Dimitra Kontou; Zoi Fitsiou

== Rugby sevens ==
A total of six medals were won by six NOC's.

=== Medal table ===
* Host nation (France)

Rank	NOC	Gold	Silver	Bronze	Total
1	France*	1	0	0	1
1	New Zealand	1	0	0	1
3	Canada	0	1	0	1
3	Fiji	0	1	0	1
5	South Africa	0	0	1	1
5	United States	0	0	1	1
Totals (6 entries)		2	2	2	6

=== Medalists ===
Event	Gold	Silver	Bronze
Men's tournament	France; Varian Pasquet; Andy Timo; Rayan Rebbadj; Théo Forner; Stephen Parez; Paulin Riva; Jefferson-Lee Joseph; Antoine Zeghdar; Aaron Grandidier Nkanang; Jean-Pascal Barraque; Antoine Dupont; Jordan Sepho; Nelson Epee	Fiji; Joji Nasova; Joseva Talacolo; Jeremia Matana; Sevuloni Mocenacagi; Iosefo Masi; Ponepati Loganimasi; Terio Veilawa; Waisea Nacuqu; Jerry Tuwai; Iowane Teba; Kaminieli Rasaku; Selestino Ravutaumada; Josaia Raisuqe; Filipe Sauturaga	South Africa; Christie Grobbelaar; Ryan Oosthuizen; Impi Visser; Zain Davids; Quewin Nortje; Tiaan Pretorius; Tristan Leyds; Selvyn Davids; Shaun Williams; Rosko Specman; Siviwe Soyizwapi; Shilton van Wyk; Ronald Brown
Women's tournament	New Zealand; Michaela Blyde; Jazmin Felix-Hotham; Sarah Hirini; Tyla King; Jorja Miller; Manaia Nuku; Mahina Paul; Risaleeana Pouri-Lane; Alena Saili; Theresa Setefano; Stacey Waaka; Portia Woodman-Wickliffe	Canada; Caroline Crossley; Olivia Apps; Alysha Corrigan; Asia Hogan-Rochester; Chloe Daniels; Charity Williams; Florence Symonds; Carissa Norsten; Krissy Scurfield; Fancy Bermudez; Piper Logan; Keyara Wardley; Taylor Perry; Shalaya Valenzuela	United States; Alev Kelter; Lauren Doyle; Kayla Canett; Kristi Kirshe; Ilona Maher; Ariana Ramsey; Naya Tapper; Alena Olsen; Alex Sedrick; Sammy Sullivan; Sarah Levy; Stephanie Rovetti

== Sailing ==
A total of 30 medals were won by 19 NOC's.

=== Medal table ===
* Host nation (France)

Rank	NOC	Gold	Silver	Bronze	Total
1	Netherlands	2	0	2	4
2	Austria	2	0	0	2
2	Italy	2	0	0	2
4	Australia	1	1	0	2
4	Israel	1	1	0	2
6	Great Britain	1	0	1	2
7	Spain	1	0	0	1
8	France*	0	1	1	2
8	New Zealand	0	1	1	2
8	Sweden	0	1	1	2
11	Argentina	0	1	0	1
11	Cyprus	0	1	0	1
11	Denmark	0	1	0	1
11	Japan	0	1	0	1
11	Slovenia	0	1	0	1
16	Norway	0	0	1	1
16	Peru	0	0	1	1
16	Singapore	0	0	1	1
16	United States	0	0	1	1
Totals (19 entries)		10	10	10	30

=== Men's events ===
Event	Gold	Silver	Bronze
iQFoil	Tom Reuveny; Israel	Grae Morris; Australia	Luuc van Opzeeland; Netherlands
Formula Kite	Valentin Bontus; Austria	Toni Vodišek; Slovenia	Maximilian Maeder; Singapore
Laser	Matthew Wearn; Australia	Pavlos Kontides; Cyprus	Stefano Peschiera; Peru
49er	Spain; Diego Botín; Florián Trittel	New Zealand; Isaac McHardie; William McKenzie	United States; Ian Barrows; Hans Henken

=== Women's events ===
Event	Gold	Silver	Bronze
iQFoil	Marta Maggetti; Italy	Sharon Kantor; Israel	Emma Wilson; Great Britain
Formula Kite	Ellie Aldridge; Great Britain	Lauriane Nolot; France	Annelous Lammerts; Netherlands
Laser radial	Marit Bouwmeester; Netherlands	Anne-Marie Rindom; Denmark	Line Flem Høst; Norway
49erFX	Netherlands; Odile van Aanholt; Annette Duetz	Sweden; Vilma Bobeck; Rebecca Netzler	France; Sarah Steyaert; Charline Picon

=== Mixed events ===
Event	Gold	Silver	Bronze
470	Austria; Lara Vadlau; Lukas Mähr	Japan; Keiju Okada; Miho Yoshioka	Sweden; Anton Dahlberg; Lovisa Karlsson
Nacra 17	Italy; Ruggero Tita; Caterina Banti	Argentina; Mateo Majdalani; Eugenia Bosco	New Zealand; Micah Wilkinson; Erica Dawson

== Shooting ==
A total of 45 medals were won by 19 NOC's.

=== Medal table ===
* Host nation (France)

Rank	NOC	Gold	Silver	Bronze	Total
1	China	5	2	3	10
2	South Korea	3	3	0	6
3	United States	1	3	1	5
4	Italy	1	2	1	4
5	Great Britain	1	1	0	2
6	Guatemala	1	0	1	2
6	Switzerland	1	0	1	2
8	Chile	1	0	0	1
8	Serbia	1	0	0	1
10	France*	0	1	0	1
10	Sweden	0	1	0	1
10	Turkey	0	1	0	1
10	Ukraine	0	1	0	1
14	India	0	0	3	3
15	Australia	0	0	1	1
15	Chinese Taipei	0	0	1	1
15	Croatia	0	0	1	1
15	Hungary	0	0	1	1
15	Kazakhstan	0	0	1	1
Totals (19 entries)		15	15	15	45

=== Men's events ===
Event	Gold	Silver	Bronze
10 metre air pistol	Xie Yu; China	Federico Nilo Maldini; Italy	Paolo Monna; Italy
25 metre rapid fire pistol	Li Yuehong; China	Cho Yeong-jae; South Korea	Wang Xinjie; China
10 metre air rifle	Sheng Lihao; China	Victor Lindgren; Sweden	Miran Maričić; Croatia
50 metre rifle three positions	Liu Yukun; China	Serhiy Kulish; Ukraine	Swapnil Kusale; India
Skeet	Vincent Hancock; United States	Conner Prince; United States	Lee Meng-yuan; Chinese Taipei
Trap	Nathan Hales; Great Britain	Qi Ying; China	Jean Pierre Brol; Guatemala

=== Women's events ===
Event	Gold	Silver	Bronze
10 metre air pistol	Oh Ye-jin; South Korea	Kim Ye-ji; South Korea	Manu Bhaker; India
25 metre pistol	Yang Ji-in; South Korea	Camille Jedrzejewski; France	Veronika Major; Hungary
10 metre air rifle	Ban Hyo-jin; South Korea	Huang Yuting; China	Audrey Gogniat; Switzerland
50 metre rifle three positions	Chiara Leone; Switzerland	Sagen Maddalena; United States	Zhang Qiongyue; China
Skeet	Francisca Crovetto; Chile	Amber Rutter; Great Britain	Austen Smith; United States
Trap	Adriana Ruano; Guatemala	Silvana Stanco; Italy	Penny Smith; Australia

=== Mixed events ===
Event	Gold	Silver	Bronze
10 metre air pistol team	Serbia; Zorana Arunović; Damir Mikec	Turkey; Şevval İlayda Tarhan; Yusuf Dikeç	India; Manu Bhaker; Sarabjot Singh
10 metre air rifle team	China; Huang Yuting; Sheng Lihao	South Korea; Keum Ji-hyeon; Park Ha-jun	Kazakhstan; Alexandra Le; Islam Satpayev
Skeet team	Italy; Diana Bacosi; Gabriele Rossetti	United States; Austen Smith; Vincent Hancock	China; Jiang Yiting; Lyu Jianlin

== Skateboarding ==
A total of 12 medals were won by five NOC's.

=== Medal table ===
* Host nation (France)

Rank	NOC	Gold	Silver	Bronze	Total
1	Japan	2	2	0	4
2	Australia	2	0	0	2
3	United States	0	2	1	3
4	Brazil	0	0	2	2
5	Great Britain	0	0	1	1
Totals (5 entries)		4	4	4	12

=== Medalists ===
Event	Gold	Silver	Bronze
Men's park	Keegan Palmer; Australia	Tom Schaar; United States	Augusto Akio; Brazil
Men's street	Yuto Horigome; Japan	Jagger Eaton; United States	Nyjah Huston; United States
Women's park	Arisa Trew; Australia	Kokona Hiraki; Japan	Sky Brown; Great Britain
Women's street	Coco Yoshizawa; Japan	Liz Akama; Japan	Rayssa Leal; Brazil

== Sport climbing ==
A total of 12 medals were won by eight NOC's.

=== Medal table ===
* Host nation (France)

Rank	NOC	Gold	Silver	Bronze	Total
1	Poland	1	0	1	2
2	Great Britain	1	0	0	1
2	Indonesia	1	0	0	1
2	Slovenia	1	0	0	1
5	China	0	2	0	2
6	United States	0	1	1	2
7	Japan	0	1	0	1
8	Austria	0	0	2	2
Totals (8 entries)		4	4	4	12

=== Medalists ===
Event	Gold	Silver	Bronze
Men's combined	Toby Roberts; Great Britain	Sorato Anraku; Japan	Jakob Schubert; Austria
Men's speed	Veddriq Leonardo; Indonesia	Wu Peng; China	Sam Watson; United States
Women's combined	Janja Garnbret; Slovenia	Brooke Raboutou; United States	Jessica Pilz; Austria
Women's speed	Aleksandra Mirosław; Poland	Deng Lijuan; China	Aleksandra Kałucka; Poland

== Surfing ==
=== Medal table ===
* Host nation (France)

Rank	NOC	Gold	Silver	Bronze	Total
1	France*	1	0	1	2
2	United States	1	0	0	1
3	Brazil	0	1	1	2
4	Australia	0	1	0	1
Totals (4 entries)		2	2	2	6

=== Medalists ===
Event	Gold	Silver	Bronze
Men's shortboard	Kauli Vaast; France	Jack Robinson; Australia	Gabriel Medina; Brazil
Women's shortboard	Caroline Marks; United States	Tatiana Weston-Webb; Brazil	Johanne Defay; France

== Swimming ==
=== Medal table ===
* Host nation (France)

Rank	Nation	Gold	Silver	Bronze	Total
1	United States	8	13	7	28
2	Australia	7	9	3	19
3	France*	4	1	2	7
4	Canada	3	2	3	8
5	Hungary	3	1	1	5
6	China	2	3	7	12
7	Italy	2	1	3	6
8	Sweden	2	0	0	2
9	Great Britain	1	4	0	5
10	Germany	1	1	1	3
11	South Africa	1	1	0	2
12	Ireland	1	0	2	3
12	Netherlands	1	0	2	3
14	Romania	1	0	1	2
15	Greece	0	1	0	1
15	Japan	0	1	0	1
17	Hong Kong	0	0	2	2
18	South Korea	0	0	1	1
18	Switzerland	0	0	1	1
Totals (19 entries)		37	38	36	111

=== Men's events ===
Event	Gold		Silver		Bronze	
50 m freestyle	Cameron McEvoy; Australia	21.25	Ben Proud; Great Britain	21.30	Florent Manaudou; France	21.56
100 m freestyle	Pan Zhanle; China	46.40 WR	Kyle Chalmers; Australia	47.48	David Popovici; Romania	47.49
200 m freestyle	David Popovici; Romania	1:44.72	Matthew Richards; Great Britain	1:44.74	Luke Hobson; United States	1:44.79
400 m freestyle	Lukas Märtens; Germany	3:41.78	Elijah Winnington; Australia	3:42.21	Kim Woo-min; South Korea	3:42.50
800 m freestyle	Daniel Wiffen; Ireland	7:38.19 OR, ER	Bobby Finke; United States	7:38.75	Gregorio Paltrinieri; Italy	7:39.38
1500 m freestyle	Bobby Finke; United States	14:30.67 WR	Gregorio Paltrinieri; Italy	14:34.55	Daniel Wiffen; Ireland	14:39.63
100 m backstroke	Thomas Ceccon; Italy	52.00	Xu Jiayu; China	52.32	Ryan Murphy; United States	52.39
200 m backstroke	Hubert Kós; Hungary	1:54.26	Apostolos Christou; Greece	1:54.82 NR	Roman Mityukov; Switzerland	1:54.85 NR
100 m breaststroke	Nicolò Martinenghi; Italy	59.03	Adam Peaty; Great Britain Nic Fink; United States	59.05	Not awarded as there was a tie for silver.	
200 m breaststroke	Léon Marchand; France	2:05.85 OR, ER	Zac Stubblety-Cook; Australia	2:06.79	Caspar Corbeau; Netherlands	2:07.90
100 m butterfly	Kristóf Milák; Hungary	49.90	Josh Liendo; Canada	49.99 NR	Ilya Kharun; Canada	50.45
200 m butterfly	Léon Marchand; France	1:51.21 OR, NR	Kristóf Milák; Hungary	1:51.75	Ilya Kharun; Canada	1:52.80 NR
200 m individual medley	Léon Marchand; France	1:54.06 OR, ER	Duncan Scott; Great Britain	1:55.31	Wang Shun; China	1:56.00
400 m individual medley	Léon Marchand; France	4:02.95 OR	Tomoyuki Matsushita; Japan	4:08.62	Carson Foster; United States	4:08.66
4 × 100 m freestyle relay	United States; Jack Alexy (47.67); Chris Guiliano (47.33); Hunter Armstrong (46.75); Caeleb Dressel (47.53); Ryan Held^{[b]} Matt King^{[b]}	3:09.28	Australia; Jack Cartwright (48.03); Flynn Southam (48.00); Kai Taylor (47.73); Kyle Chalmers (46.59); William Yang^{[b]}	3:10.35	Italy; Alessandro Miressi (48.04); Thomas Ceccon (47.44); Paolo Conte Bonin (48.16); Manuel Frigo (47.06); Lorenzo Zazzeri^{[b]} Leonardo Deplano^{[b]}	3:10.70
4 × 200 m freestyle relay	Great Britain; James Guy (1:45.09); Tom Dean (1:45.28); Matt Richards (1:45.11); Duncan Scott (1:43.95); Jack McMillan^{[b]} Kieran Bird^{[b]}	6:59.43	United States; Luke Hobson (1:45.55); Carson Foster (1:45.31); Drew Kibler (1:45.12); Kieran Smith (1:44.80); Brooks Curry^{[b]} Blake Pieroni^{[b]} Chris Guiliano^{[b]}	7:00.78	Australia; Maximillian Giuliani (1:45.99); Flynn Southam (1:45.53); Elijah Winnington (1:45.19); Thomas Neill (1:45.27); Kai Taylor^{[b]} Zac Incerti^{[b]}	7:01.98
4 × 100 m medley relay	China; Xu Jiayu (52.37); Qin Haiyang (57.98); Sun Jiajun (51.19); Pan Zhanle (45.92); Wang Changhao^{[b]}	3:27.46	United States; Ryan Murphy (52.44); Nic Fink (58.97); Caeleb Dressel (49.41); Hunter Armstrong (47.19); Charlie Swanson^{[b]} Thomas Heilman^{[b]} Jack Alexy^{[b]}	3:28.01	France; Yohann Ndoye-Brouard (52.60); Léon Marchand (58.62); Maxime Grousset (49.57); Florent Manaudou (47.59); Clément Secchi^{[b]} Rafael Fente-Damers^{[b]}	3:28.38 NR
10 km open water	Kristóf Rasovszky; Hungary	1:50:52.7	Oliver Klemet; Germany	1:50:54.8	Dávid Betlehem; Hungary	1:51:09.0

=== Women's events ===
Event	Gold		Silver		Bronze	
50 m freestyle	Sarah Sjöström; Sweden	23.71	Meg Harris; Australia	23.97	Zhang Yufei; China	24.20
100 m freestyle	Sarah Sjöström; Sweden	52.16	Torri Huske; United States	52.29	Siobhán Haughey; Hong Kong	52.33
200 m freestyle	Mollie O'Callaghan; Australia	1:53.27 OR	Ariarne Titmus; Australia	1:53.81	Siobhán Haughey; Hong Kong	1:54.55
400 m freestyle	Ariarne Titmus; Australia	3:57.49	Summer McIntosh; Canada	3:58.37	Katie Ledecky; United States	4:00.86
800 m freestyle	Katie Ledecky; United States	8:11.04	Ariarne Titmus; Australia	8:12.29 OC	Paige Madden; United States	8:13.00
1500 m freestyle	Katie Ledecky; United States	15:30.02 OR	Anastasiya Kirpichnikova; France	15:40.35 NR	Isabel Marie Gose; Germany	15:41.16 NR
100 m backstroke	Kaylee McKeown; Australia	57.33 OR, =OC	Regan Smith; United States	57.66	Katharine Berkoff; United States	57.98
200 m backstroke	Kaylee McKeown; Australia	2:03.73 OR	Regan Smith; United States	2:04.26	Kylie Masse; Canada	2:05.57
100 m breaststroke	Tatjana Smith; South Africa	1:05.28	Tang Qianting; China	1:05.54	Mona McSharry; Ireland	1:05.59
200 m breaststroke	Kate Douglass; United States	2:19.24 AM	Tatjana Smith; South Africa	2:19.60	Tes Schouten; Netherlands	2:21.05
100 m butterfly	Torri Huske; United States	55.59	Gretchen Walsh; United States	55.63	Zhang Yufei; China	56.21
200 m butterfly	Summer McIntosh; Canada	2:03.03 OR, WJ, AM	Regan Smith; United States	2:03.84 NR	Zhang Yufei; China	2:05.09
200 m individual medley	Summer McIntosh; Canada	2:06.56 OR, WJ, NR	Kate Douglass; United States	2:06.92	Kaylee McKeown; Australia	2:08.08
400 m individual medley	Summer McIntosh; Canada	4:27.71	Katie Grimes; United States	4:33.40	Emma Weyant; United States	4:34.93
4 × 100 m freestyle relay	Australia; Mollie O'Callaghan (52.24); Shayna Jack (52.35); Emma McKeon (52.39); Meg Harris (51.94); Olivia Wunsch^{[b]} Bronte Campbell^{[b]}	3:28.92 OR	United States; Kate Douglass (52.98); Gretchen Walsh (52.55); Torri Huske (52.06); Simone Manuel (52.61); Abbey Weitzeil^{[b]} Erika Connolly^{[b]}	3:30.20 AM	China; Yang Junxuan (52.48); Cheng Yujie (52.76); Zhang Yufei (52.75); Wu Qingfeng (52.31); Yu Yiting^{[b]}	3:30.30 AS
4 × 200 m freestyle relay	Australia; Mollie O'Callaghan (1:53.52); Lani Pallister (1:55.61); Brianna Throssell (1:56.00); Ariarne Titmus (1:52.95); Jamie Perkins^{[b]} Shayna Jack^{[b]}	7:38.08 OR	United States; Claire Weinstein (1:54.88); Paige Madden (1:55.63); Katie Ledecky (1:54.93); Erin Gemmell (1:55.40); Anna Peplowski^{[b]} Simone Manuel^{[b]} Alex Shackell^{[b]}	7:40.86	China; Yang Junxuan (1:54.52); Li Bingjie (1:55.05); Ge Chutong (1:57.45); Liu Yaxin (1:55.32); Tang Muhan^{[b]} Kong Yaqi^{[b]}	7:42.34
4 × 100 m medley relay	United States; Regan Smith (57.28) OR; Lilly King (1:04.90); Gretchen Walsh (55.03); Torri Huske (52.42); Katharine Berkoff^{[b]} Emma Weber^{[b]} Alex Shackell^{[b]} Kate Douglass^{[b]}	3:49.63 WR	Australia; Kaylee McKeown (57.72); Jenna Strauch (1:07.31); Emma McKeon (56.25); Mollie O'Callaghan (51.83); Iona Anderson^{[b]} Ella Ramsay^{[b]} Alexandria Perkins^{[b]} Meg Harris^{[b]}	3:53.11	China; Wan Letian (59.81); Tang Qianting (1:05.79); Zhang Yufei (55.52); Yang Junxuan (52.11); Wang Xue'er^{[b]} Yu Yiting^{[b]} Wu Qingfeng^{[b]}	3:53.23
10 km open water	Sharon van Rouwendaal; Netherlands	2:03:34.2	Moesha Johnson; Australia	2:03:39.7	Ginevra Taddeucci; Italy	2:03:42.8

^{b} Swimmers who participated in the heats only and received medals.

=== Mixed events ===
Event	Gold		Silver		Bronze	
4 × 100 m medley relay	United States; Ryan Murphy (52.08); Nic Fink (58.29); Gretchen Walsh (55.18); Torri Huske (51.88); Regan Smith^{[b]} Charlie Swanson^{[b]} Caeleb Dressel^{[b]} Abbey Weitzeil^{[b]}	3:37.43 WR	China; Xu Jiayu (52.13); Qin Haiyang (57.82); Zhang Yufei (55.64); Yang Junxuan (51.96); Tang Qianting^{[b]} Pan Zhanle^{[b]}	3:37.55 AS	Australia; Kaylee McKeown (57.90); Joshua Yong (58.43); Matthew Temple (50.42); Mollie O'Callaghan (52.01); Iona Anderson^{[b]} Zac Stubblety-Cook^{[b]} Emma McKeon^{[b]} Kyle Chalmers^{[b]}	3:38.76 OC

^{b} Swimmers who participated in the heats only and received medals.

== Table tennis ==
A total of 15 medals were won by six NOC's.

=== Medal table ===
* Host nation (France)

Rank	NOC	Gold	Silver	Bronze	Total
1	China	5	1	0	6
2	Sweden	0	2	0	2
3	Japan	0	1	1	2
4	North Korea	0	1	0	1
5	France*	0	0	2	2
5	South Korea	0	0	2	2
Totals (6 entries)		5	5	5	15

=== Medalists ===
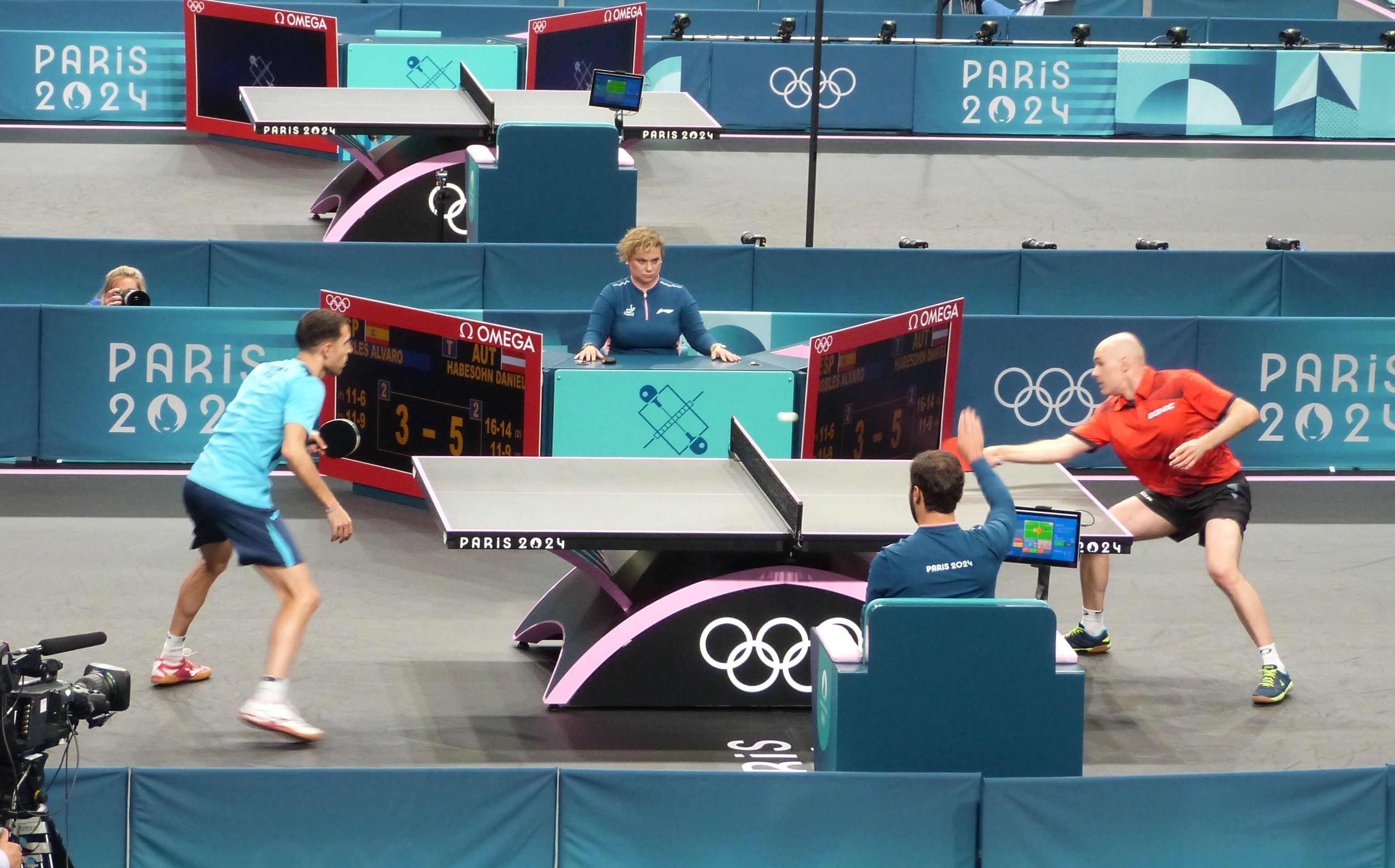
During the competition

Event	Gold	Silver	Bronze
Men's singles	Fan Zhendong; China	Truls Möregårdh; Sweden	Félix Lebrun; France
Men's team	China; Fan Zhendong; Ma Long; Wang Chuqin	Sweden; Anton Källberg; Kristian Karlsson; Truls Möregårdh	France; Simon Gauzy; Alexis Lebrun; Félix Lebrun
Women's singles	Chen Meng; China	Sun Yingsha; China	Hina Hayata; Japan
Women's team	China; Sun Yingsha; Wang Manyu; Chen Meng	Japan; Hina Hayata; Miwa Harimoto; Miu Hirano	South Korea; Shin Yu-bin; Jeon Ji-hee; Lee Eun-hye
Mixed doubles	China; Wang Chuqin; Sun Yingsha	North Korea; Ri Jong-sik; Kim Kum-yong	South Korea; Lim Jong-hoon; Shin Yu-bin

== Taekwondo ==
A total of 32 medals were won by 23 NOC's.

=== Medal table ===
* Host nation (France)

Rank	NOC	Gold	Silver	Bronze	Total
1	South Korea	2	0	1	3
2	Iran	1	2	1	4
3	Uzbekistan	1	1	0	2
4	France*	1	0	1	2
4	Tunisia	1	0	1	2
6	Hungary	1	0	0	1
6	Thailand	1	0	0	1
8	China	0	1	1	2
9	Azerbaijan	0	1	0	1
9	Great Britain	0	1	0	1
9	Jordan	0	1	0	1
9	Serbia	0	1	0	1
13	Belgium	0	0	1	1
13	Brazil	0	0	1	1
13	Bulgaria	0	0	1	1
13	Canada	0	0	1	1
13	Croatia	0	0	1	1
13	Cuba	0	0	1	1
13	Denmark	0	0	1	1
13	Italy	0	0	1	1
13	Ivory Coast	0	0	1	1
13	Turkey	0	0	1	1
13	United States	0	0	1	1
Totals (23 entries)		8	8	16	32

=== Men's events ===
Event	Gold	Silver	Bronze
58 kg	Park Tae-joon; South Korea	Gashim Magomedov; Azerbaijan	Cyrian Ravet; France
58 kg	Park Tae-joon; South Korea	Gashim Magomedov; Azerbaijan	Mohamed Khalil Jendoubi; Tunisia
68 kg	Ulugbek Rashitov; Uzbekistan	Zaid Kareem; Jordan	Liang Yushuai; China
68 kg	Ulugbek Rashitov; Uzbekistan	Zaid Kareem; Jordan	Edival Pontes; Brazil
80 kg	Firas Katoussi; Tunisia	Mehran Barkhordari; Iran	Simone Alessio; Italy
80 kg	Firas Katoussi; Tunisia	Mehran Barkhordari; Iran	Edi Hrnic; Denmark
+80 kg	Arian Salimi; Iran	Caden Cunningham; Great Britain	Rafael Alba; Cuba
+80 kg	Arian Salimi; Iran	Caden Cunningham; Great Britain	Cheick Sallah Cissé; Ivory Coast

=== Women's events ===
Event	Gold	Silver	Bronze
49 kg	Panipak Wongpattanakit; Thailand	Guo Qing; China	Mobina Nematzadeh; Iran
49 kg	Panipak Wongpattanakit; Thailand	Guo Qing; China	Lena Stojković; Croatia
57 kg	Kim Yu-jin; South Korea	Nahid Kiani; Iran	Skylar Park; Canada
57 kg	Kim Yu-jin; South Korea	Nahid Kiani; Iran	Kimia Alizadeh; Bulgaria
67 kg	Viviana Márton; Hungary	Aleksandra Perišić; Serbia	Kristina Teachout; United States
67 kg	Viviana Márton; Hungary	Aleksandra Perišić; Serbia	Sarah Chaâri; Belgium
+67 kg	Althéa Laurin; France	Svetlana Osipova; Uzbekistan	Lee Da-bin; South Korea
+67 kg	Althéa Laurin; France	Svetlana Osipova; Uzbekistan	Nafia Kuş; Turkey

== Tennis ==
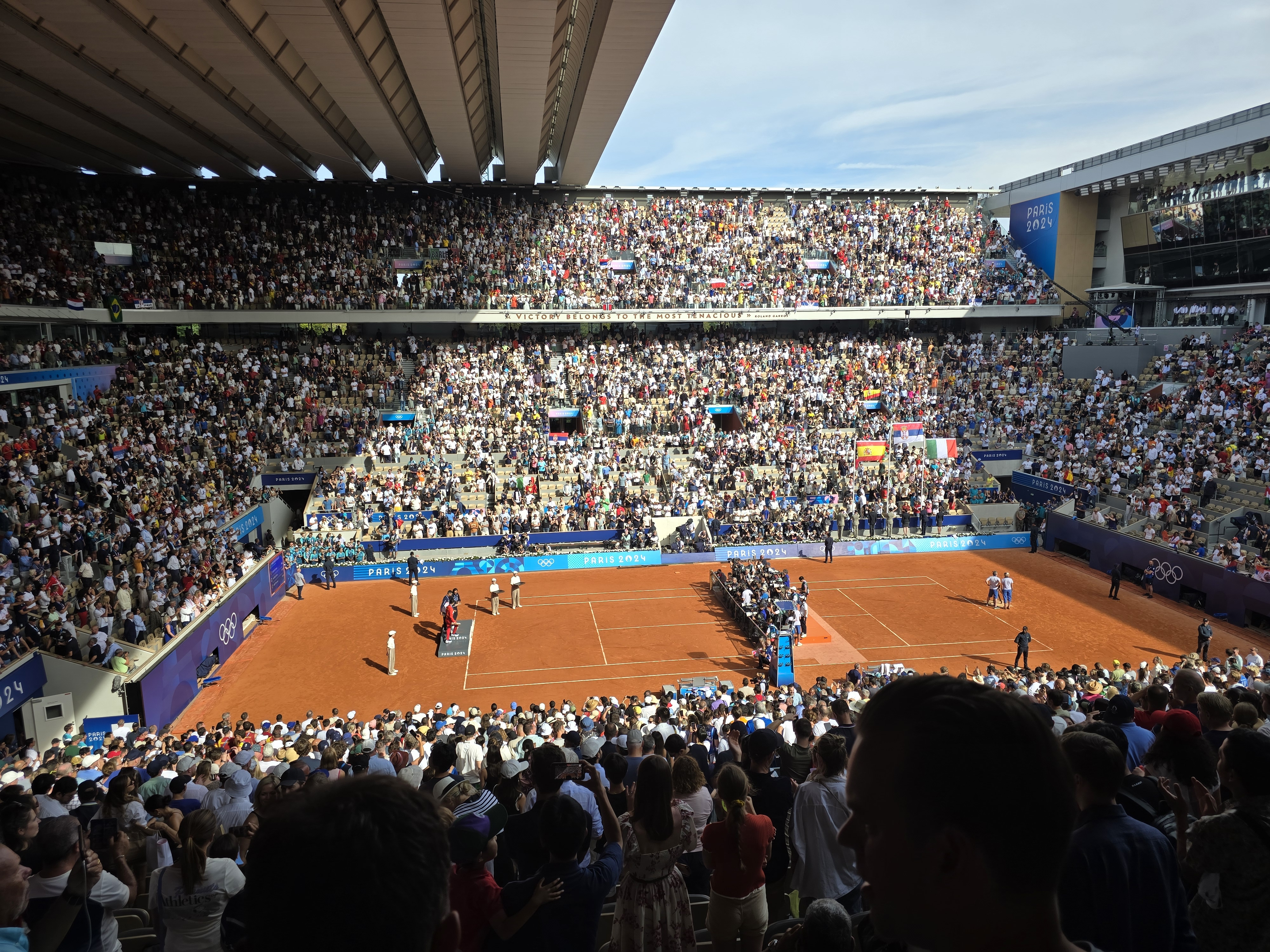
Men's singles tennis tournament podium

A total of fifteen medals were won by ten NOC's and the Independent Athletes team.

=== Events ===
Event	Gold	Silver	Bronze
Men's singles	Novak Djokovic; Serbia	Carlos Alcaraz; Spain	Lorenzo Musetti; Italy
Men's doubles	Australia; Matthew Ebden; John Peers	United States; Austin Krajicek; Rajeev Ram	United States; Taylor Fritz; Tommy Paul
Women's singles	Zheng Qinwen; China	Donna Vekić; Croatia	Iga Świątek; Poland
Women's doubles	Italy; Sara Errani; Jasmine Paolini	Individual Neutral Athletes; Mirra Andreeva; Diana Shnaider	Spain; Cristina Bucșa; Sara Sorribes Tormo
Mixed doubles	Czech Republic; Kateřina Siniaková; Tomáš Macháč	China; Wang Xinyu; Zhang Zhizhen	Canada; Gabriela Dabrowski; Félix Auger-Aliassime

=== Medal table ===
* Host nation (France)

Rank	NOC	Gold	Silver	Bronze	Total
1	China	1	1	0	2
2	Italy	1	0	1	2
3	Australia	1	0	0	1
3	Czech Republic	1	0	0	1
3	Serbia	1	0	0	1
6	Spain	0	1	1	2
6	United States	0	1	1	2
8	Croatia	0	1	0	1
–	Individual Neutral Athletes	0	1	0	1
9	Canada	0	0	1	1
9	Poland	0	0	1	1
Totals (10 entries)		5	5	5	15

== Triathlon ==
A total of nine medals were won by six NOC's.

=== Medal table ===
* Host nation (France)

Rank	NOC	Gold	Silver	Bronze	Total
1	Great Britain	1	0	2	3
2	France*	1	0	1	2
3	Germany	1	0	0	1
4	New Zealand	0	1	0	1
4	Switzerland	0	1	0	1
4	United States	0	1	0	1
Totals (6 entries)		3	3	3	9

=== Medalists ===
Games	Gold		Silver		Bronze	
Men's individual	Alex Yee; Great Britain	1:43:33	Hayden Wilde; New Zealand	1:43:39	Léo Bergère; France	1:43:43
Women's individual	Cassandre Beaugrand; France	1:54:55	Julie Derron; Switzerland	1:55:01	Beth Potter; Great Britain	1:55:10
Mixed relay	Germany; Tim Hellwig; Lisa Tertsch; Lasse Lührs; Laura Lindemann	1:25:39	United States; Seth Rider; Taylor Spivey; Morgan Pearson; Taylor Knibb	1:25:40	Great Britain; Alex Yee; Georgia Taylor-Brown; Sam Dickinson; Beth Potter	1:25:40

== Volleyball ==
=== Medal table ===
* Host nation (France)

Rank	NOC	Gold	Silver	Bronze	Total
1	Brazil	1	0	1	2
2	France*	1	0	0	1
2	Italy	1	0	0	1
2	Sweden	1	0	0	1
5	United States	0	1	1	2
6	Canada	0	1	0	1
6	Germany	0	1	0	1
6	Poland	0	1	0	1
9	Norway	0	0	1	1
9	Switzerland	0	0	1	1
Totals (10 entries)		4	4	4	12

=== Medalists ===
==== Beach volleyball ====
Event	Gold	Silver	Bronze
Men's beach	Sweden; David Åhman; Jonatan Hellvig	Germany; Nils Ehlers; Clemens Wickler	Norway; Anders Mol; Christian Sørum
Women's beach	Brazil; Ana Patrícia; Duda Lisboa	Canada; Melissa Humana-Paredes; Brandie Wilkerson	Switzerland; Tanja Hüberli; Nina Betschart

==== Indoor volleyball ====
Event	Gold	Silver	Bronze
Men's tournament	France; Barthélémy Chinenyeze; Jenia Grebennikov; Jean Patry; Benjamin Toniutti; Kévin Tillie; Earvin N'Gapeth; Antoine Brizard; Nicolas Le Goff; Trévor Clévenot; Yacine Louati; Théo Faure; Quentin Jouffroy	Poland; Łukasz Kaczmarek; Bartosz Kurek; Wilfredo León; Aleksander Śliwka; Grzegorz Łomacz; Jakub Kochanowski; Kamil Semeniuk; Paweł Zatorski; Marcin Janusz; Mateusz Bieniek; Tomasz Fornal; Norbert Huber; Bartłomiej Bołądź	United States; Matt Anderson; Aaron Russell; Jeffrey Jendryk; Torey DeFalco; Micah Christenson; Maxwell Holt; Micah Maʻa; Thomas Jaeschke; Garrett Muagututia; Taylor Averill; David Smith; Erik Shoji
Women's tournament	Italy; Marina Lubian; Carlotta Cambi; Monica De Gennaro; Alessia Orro; Caterina Bosetti; Anna Danesi; Myriam Sylla; Paola Egonu; Sarah Luisa Fahr; Loveth Omoruyi; Ekaterina Antropova; Gaia Giovannini; Ilaria Spirito	United States; Micha Hancock; Jordyn Poulter; Avery Skinner; Justine Wong-Orantes; Lauren Carlini; Jordan Larson; Annie Drews; Jordan Thompson; Haleigh Washington; Dana Rettke; Kathryn Plummer; Kelsey Robinson Cook; Chiaka Ogbogu	Brazil; Nyeme Costa; Diana Duarte; Macris Carneiro; Thaísa Menezes; Rosamaria Montibeller; Roberta Ratzke; Gabriela Guimarães; Ana Cristina de Souza; Natália Araújo; Ana Carolina da Silva; Júlia Bergmann; Tainara Santos; Lorenne Teixeira

== Water polo ==
=== Medal table ===
* Host nation (France)

Rank	NOC	Gold	Silver	Bronze	Total
1	Serbia	1	0	0	1
1	Spain	1	0	0	1
3	Australia	0	1	0	1
3	Croatia	0	1	0	1
5	Netherlands	0	0	1	1
5	United States	0	0	1	1
Totals (6 entries)		2	2	2	6

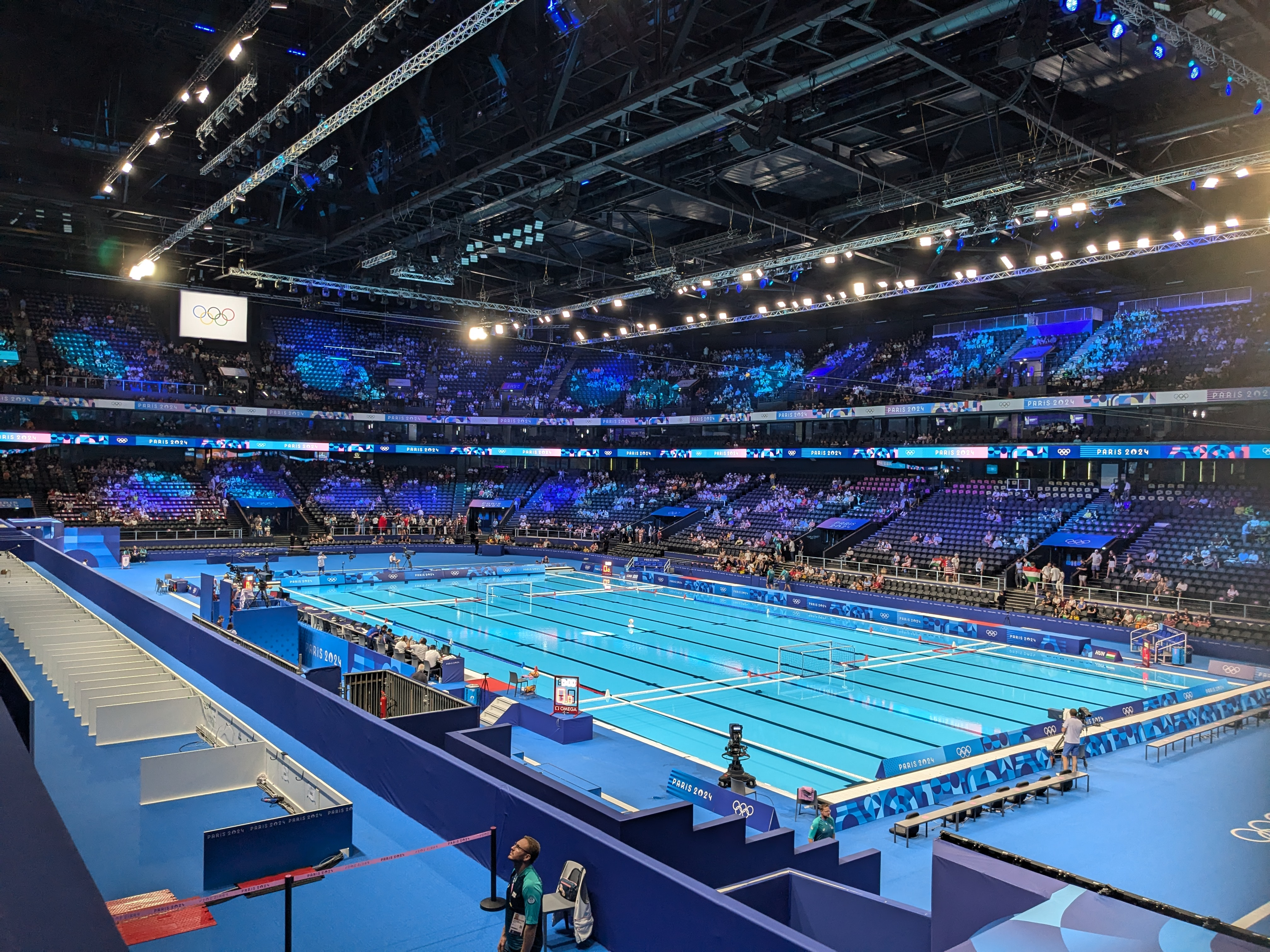
Paris La Défense Arena during the water polo competitions

=== Medalists ===
Event	Gold	Silver	Bronze
Men's tournament	Serbia; Radoslav Filipović; Dušan Mandić; Strahinja Rašović; Sava Ranđelović; Miloš Ćuk; Nikola Dedović; Radomir Drašović; Nikola Jakšić; Nemanja Ubović; Nemanja Vico; Petar Jakšić; Viktor Rašović; Vladimir Mišović	Croatia; Marko Bijač; Rino Burić; Loren Fatović; Luka Lončar; Maro Joković; Luka Bukić; Ante Vukičević; Marko Žuvela; Jerko Marinić Kragić; Josip Vrlić; Matias Biljaka; Konstantin Kharkov; Toni Popadić	United States; Alex Bowen; Luca Cupido; Hannes Daube; Chase Dodd; Ryder Dodd; Ben Hallock; Drew Holland; Johnny Hooper; Max Irving; Alex Obert; Marko Vavic; Adrian Weinberg; Dylan Woodhead
Women's tournament	Spain; Paula Camus; Paula Crespí; Anni Espar; Laura Ester; Judith Forca; Maica García Godoy; Paula Leitón; Beatriz Ortiz; Pili Peña; Nona Pérez; Isabel Piralkova; Elena Ruiz; Martina Terré	Australia; Abby Andrews; Charlize Andrews; Zoe Arancini; Elle Armit; Keesja Gofers; Sienna Green; Bronte Halligan; Sienna Hearn; Danijela Jackovich; Matilda Kearns; Genevieve Longman; Gabriella Palm; Alice Williams	Netherlands; Laura Aarts; Sarah Buis; Kitty-Lynn Joustra; Maartje Keuning; Lola Moolhuijzen; Bente Rogge; Lieke Rogge; Vivian Sevenich; Brigitte Sleeking; Nina ten Broek; Simone van de Kraats; Sabrina van der Sloot; Iris Wolves

== Weightlifting ==
=== Medal table ===
* Host nation (France)

Rank	NOC	Gold	Silver	Bronze	Total
1	China	5	0	0	5
2	Bulgaria	1	0	1	2
2	United States	1	0	1	2
4	Georgia	1	0	0	1
4	Indonesia	1	0	0	1
4	Norway	1	0	0	1
7	Thailand	0	2	1	3
8	Colombia	0	2	0	2
9	Armenia	0	1	0	1
9	Canada	0	1	0	1
9	Egypt	0	1	0	1
9	Romania	0	1	0	1
9	South Korea	0	1	0	1
9	Uzbekistan	0	1	0	1
15	Ecuador	0	0	2	2
16	Bahrain	0	0	1	1
16	Chinese Taipei	0	0	1	1
16	Great Britain	0	0	1	1
16	Italy	0	0	1	1
–	Individual Neutral Athletes	0	0	1	1
Totals (19 entries)		10	10	10	30

=== Men's events ===
Event	Gold		Silver		Bronze	
61 kg	Li Fabin; China	310 kg	Theerapong Silachai; Thailand	303 kg	Hampton Morris; United States	298 kg
73 kg	Rizki Juniansyah; Indonesia	354 kg	Weeraphon Wichuma; Thailand	346 kg	Bozhidar Andreev; Bulgaria	344 kg
89 kg	Karlos Nasar; Bulgaria	404 kg WR	Yeison López; Colombia	390 kg	Antonino Pizzolato; Italy	384 kg
102 kg	Liu Huanhua; China	406 kg	Akbar Djuraev; Uzbekistan	404 kg	Yauheni Tsikhantsou; Individual Neutral Athletes	402 kg
+102 kg	Lasha Talakhadze; Georgia	470 kg	Varazdat Lalayan; Armenia	467 kg	Gor Minasyan; Bahrain	461 kg

=== Women's events ===
Event	Gold		Silver		Bronze	
49 kg	Hou Zhihui; China	206 kg	Mihaela Cambei; Romania	205 kg	Surodchana Khambao; Thailand	200 kg
59 kg	Luo Shifang; China	241 kg OR	Maude Charron; Canada	236 kg	Kuo Hsing-chun; Chinese Taipei	235 kg
71 kg	Olivia Reeves; United States	262 kg	Mari Sánchez; Colombia	257 kg	Angie Palacios; Ecuador	256 kg
81 kg	Solfrid Koanda; Norway	275 kg OR	Sara Ahmed; Egypt	268 kg	Neisi Dajomes; Ecuador	267 kg
+81 kg	Li Wenwen; China	309 kg	Park Hye-jeong; South Korea	299 kg	Emily Campbell; Great Britain	288 kg

== Wrestling ==
=== Medal table ===
* Host nation (France)

Rank	Nation	Gold	Silver	Bronze	Total
1	Japan	8	1	2	11
2	Iran	2	4	2	8
3	United States	2	2	3	7
4	Bulgaria	2	0	0	2
5	Cuba	1	1	3	5
6	Georgia	1	1	0	2
7	Uzbekistan	1	0	1	2
8	Bahrain	1	0	0	1
9	Ukraine	0	2	1	3
10	China	0	1	4	5
10	Kyrgyzstan	0	1	4	5
12	Armenia	0	1	1	2
13	Chile	0	1	0	1
13	Ecuador	0	1	0	1
13	Kazakhstan	0	1	0	1
13	Moldova	0	1	0	1
17	Azerbaijan	0	0	3	3
18	Albania	0	0	2	2
18	North Korea	0	0	2	2
18	Turkey	0	0	2	2
21	Colombia	0	0	1	1
21	Denmark	0	0	1	1
21	Greece	0	0	1	1
21	India	0	0	1	1
21	Norway	0	0	1	1
21	Puerto Rico	0	0	1	1
Totals (26 entries)		18	18	36	72

=== Men's freestyle ===
Event	Gold	Silver	Bronze
57 kg	Rei Higuchi; Japan	Spencer Lee; United States	Aman Sehrawat; India
57 kg	Rei Higuchi; Japan	Spencer Lee; United States	Gulomjon Abdullaev; Uzbekistan
65 kg	Kotaro Kiyooka; Japan	Rahman Amouzad; Iran	Sebastian Rivera; Puerto Rico
65 kg	Kotaro Kiyooka; Japan	Rahman Amouzad; Iran	Islam Dudaev; Albania
74 kg	Razambek Zhamalov; Uzbekistan	Daichi Takatani; Japan	Kyle Dake; United States
74 kg	Razambek Zhamalov; Uzbekistan	Daichi Takatani; Japan	Chermen Valiev; Albania
86 kg	Magomed Ramazanov; Bulgaria	Hassan Yazdani; Iran	Aaron Brooks; United States
86 kg	Magomed Ramazanov; Bulgaria	Hassan Yazdani; Iran	Dauren Kurugliev; Greece
97 kg	Akhmed Tazhudinov; Bahrain	Givi Matcharashvili; Georgia	Magomedkhan Magomedov; Azerbaijan
97 kg	Akhmed Tazhudinov; Bahrain	Givi Matcharashvili; Georgia	Amir Ali Azarpira; Iran
125 kg	Geno Petriashvili; Georgia	Amir Hossein Zare; Iran	Taha Akgül; Turkey
125 kg	Geno Petriashvili; Georgia	Amir Hossein Zare; Iran	Giorgi Meshvildishvili; Azerbaijan

=== Men's Greco-Roman ===
Event	Gold	Silver	Bronze
60 kg	Kenichiro Fumita; Japan	Cao Liguo; China	Zholaman Sharshenbekov; Kyrgyzstan
60 kg	Kenichiro Fumita; Japan	Cao Liguo; China	Ri Se-ung; North Korea
67 kg	Saeid Esmaeili; Iran	Parviz Nasibov; Ukraine	Hasrat Jafarov; Azerbaijan
67 kg	Saeid Esmaeili; Iran	Parviz Nasibov; Ukraine	Luis Orta; Cuba
77 kg	Nao Kusaka; Japan	Demeu Zhadrayev; Kazakhstan	Malkhas Amoyan; Armenia
77 kg	Nao Kusaka; Japan	Demeu Zhadrayev; Kazakhstan	Akzhol Makhmudov; Kyrgyzstan
87 kg	Semen Novikov; Bulgaria	Alireza Mohmadi; Iran	Zhan Beleniuk; Ukraine
87 kg	Semen Novikov; Bulgaria	Alireza Mohmadi; Iran	Turpal Bisultanov; Denmark
97 kg	Mohammad Hadi Saravi; Iran	Artur Aleksanyan; Armenia	Gabriel Rosillo; Cuba
97 kg	Mohammad Hadi Saravi; Iran	Artur Aleksanyan; Armenia	Uzur Dzhuzupbekov; Kyrgyzstan
130 kg	Mijaín López; Cuba	Yasmani Acosta; Chile	Amin Mirzazadeh; Iran
130 kg	Mijaín López; Cuba	Yasmani Acosta; Chile	Meng Lingzhe; China

=== Women's freestyle ===
Event	Gold	Silver	Bronze
50 kg	Sarah Hildebrandt; United States	Yusneylys Guzmán; Cuba	Yui Susaki; Japan
50 kg	Sarah Hildebrandt; United States	Yusneylys Guzmán; Cuba	Feng Ziqi; China
53 kg	Akari Fujinami; Japan	Lucía Yépez; Ecuador	Choe Hyo-gyong; North Korea
53 kg	Akari Fujinami; Japan	Lucía Yépez; Ecuador	Pang Qianyu; China
57 kg	Tsugumi Sakurai; Japan	Anastasia Nichita; Moldova	Helen Maroulis; United States
57 kg	Tsugumi Sakurai; Japan	Anastasia Nichita; Moldova	Hong Kexin; China
62 kg	Sakura Motoki; Japan	Iryna Koliadenko; Ukraine	Aisuluu Tynybekova; Kyrgyzstan
62 kg	Sakura Motoki; Japan	Iryna Koliadenko; Ukraine	Grace Bullen; Norway
68 kg	Amit Elor; United States	Meerim Zhumanazarova; Kyrgyzstan	Buse Tosun Çavuşoğlu; Turkey
68 kg	Amit Elor; United States	Meerim Zhumanazarova; Kyrgyzstan	Nonoka Ozaki; Japan
76 kg	Yuka Kagami; Japan	Kennedy Blades; United States	Milaimys Marín; Cuba
76 kg	Yuka Kagami; Japan	Kennedy Blades; United States	Tatiana Rentería; Colombia

== See also ==
- 2024 Summer Olympics medal table
