= Dominik Buksak =

Polish athlete

Dominik Buksak (born 19 September 1992) is a Polish athlete who competed in the men's 49er event at the 2024 Summer Olympics. He won the European vice-champion in men's 49er in 2018 and 2023.

== Career ==
Buksak started competing in the 470 and 420 classes. In 2009, he finished 48th in the 420 class world championships. At Sailing at the 2024 Summer Olympics – 49er, he came 5th.
