= Sailing at the 2024 Summer Olympics – 49er =

Men's 49er at the Games of the XXXIII Olympiad
- Venue: Marseille Marina
- Dates: 28 July – 2 August
- Competitors: 40 from 20 nations

Medalists
1st place, gold medalist(s)		Diego Botín; Florián Trittel	Spain
2nd place, silver medalist(s)		Isaac McHardie; William McKenzie	New Zealand
3rd place, bronze medalist(s)		Ian Barrows; Hans Henken	United States

The men's 49er is a sailing event, part of Sailing at the 2024 Summer Olympics in Marseille that took place between 28 July – 2 August.

== Schedule ==
Sun 28 Jul	Mon 29 Jul	Tue 30 Jul	Wed 31 Jul	Fri 2 Aug
Race 1 Race 2 Race 3	Race 4 Race 5 Race 6	Race 7 Race 8 Race 9	Race 10; Race 11; Race 12	Medal race

== Results ==
Official results

Results of individual races
Pos	Crew	Country	I	II	III	IV	V	VI	VII	VIII	IX	X	XI	XII	MR	Tot	Pts
1st place, gold medalist(s)	Diego Botín; Florián Trittel	Spain	16^{†}	6	4	5	11	2	3	2	2	15	12	6	2	86	70
2nd place, silver medalist(s)	Isaac McHardie; William McKenzie	New Zealand	1	3	8	8	1	1	11	18^{†}	17	1	10	15	6	100	82
3rd place, bronze medalist(s)	Ian Barrows; Hans Henken	United States	8	7	17^{†}	9	9	5	10	7	3	2	8	12	8	105	88
4	Robert Dickson; Sean Waddilove	Ireland	9	4	1	4	2	21^{†} DSQ	4	13	9	11	14	2	18	112	91
5	Dominik Buksak; Szymon Wierzbicki	Poland	10	8	6	1	18^{†}	14	8	1	13	9	5	8	10	111	93
6	Bart Lambriex; Floris van de Werken	Netherlands	13	1	7	16	7	11	19^{†}	6	7	13	1	13	4	118	99
7	James Peters; Fynn Sterritt	Great Britain	18	11	13	6	5	4	5	11	1	19^{†}	6	5	14	118	99
8	Sébastien Schneiter; Arno De Planta	Switzerland	2	9	11	17	3	19^{†}	1	5	15	6	4	19	12	123	104
9	Šime Fantela; Mihovil Fantela	Croatia	12	15^{†}	12	13	4	6	2	15	8	10	2	1	22; OCS	122	107
10	Hernán Umpierre; Fernando Diz	Uruguay	5	2	14	2	17	13	18^{†}	9	4	8	13	7	16	128	110
11	Jakob Meggendorfer; Andreas Spranger	Germany	6	21^{†} BFD	3	12	8	3	16	12	11	7	17	14		130	109
12	Erwan Fischer; Clément Péquin	France	7	16	2	3	19	10	7	8	12	21^{†} UFD	20	11		136	115
13	Wen Zaiding; Liu Tian	China	4	10	15	7	6	15	13	14	5	15,5; DPI	21^{†}	14,5; DPI		140	119
14	Benjamin Bildstein; David Hussl	Austria	3	5	9	11	13	17	17	19^{†}	6	16	15	10		141	122
15	Jim Colley; Shaun Connor	Australia	19	17	10	14	10	9	12	3	10	3	16	20^{†}		143	123
16	Yannick Lefèbvre; Jan Heuninck	Belgium	20^{†}	19	5	15	15	7	14	17	19	4	3	9		147	127
17	Will Jones; Justin Barnes	Canada	14	13	20^{†}	18	12	8	15	4	20	14	7	17		162	142
18	Daniel Nyborg; Nikolaj Hoffmann Buhl	Denmark	11	18	18	10	21^{†} UFD	16	6	16	18	17	18	3		172	151
19	Marco Grael; Gabriel Simões	Brazil	21^{†} DPI	14	16	20	16	18	9	10	16	12	19	16		187	166
20	Akira Sakai; Russell Aylsworth	Hong Kong	17	12	19	19	14	12	20^{†}	20	14	18	9	18		192	172

Scoring system: low-point system;
Legend: – Qualified for medal race(s); BFD – Black flag disqualification; DNF – Did not finish; DSQ – Disqualified; OCS – On the course side of the starting line; STP – Standard penalty imposed; UFD – "U" flag disqualification; † – Discarded race not counted in the overall result;
