= Isaac McHardie =

New Zealand sailor

Personal information
- Full name: Isaac Kale McHardie
- Born: 6 July 1997 (age 29) Hamilton, New Zealand
- Height: 180 cm (5 ft 11 in)

Sailing career
- Sport: Sailing
- Club: Royal Akarana Yacht Club
- Class: 49er
Medal record
Men's sailing
Representing New Zealand
Olympic Games
Silver medal – second place	2024 Paris	49er

Isaac Kale McHardie (born 6 July 1997) is a New Zealand sailor. He competed in the 49er event at the 2024 Summer Olympics, where he won a silver medal with William McKenzie.
