= William McKenzie (sailor) =

New Zealand sailor

Personal information
- Born: 19 February 1997 (age 29) Auckland, New Zealand

Sailing career
- Sport: Sailing
- Club: Royal Akarana Yacht Club
- Class: 49er
Medal record
Men's sailing
Representing New Zealand
Olympic Games
Silver medal – second place	2024 Paris	49er

William McKenzie (born 19 February 1997) is a New Zealand sailor. He competed in the 49er event at the 2024 Summer Olympics, where he won a silver medal with Isaac McHardie.
