= Cadet (disambiguation) =

A cadet is a trainee, typically to become a military officer.

Cadet may also refer to:

== Arts and entertainment ==
- Cadets (TV pilot), a 1988 American sitcom summer special
- Cadet (band), a Christian alternative rock band from Eugene, Oregon, formed in 2000 and disbanded in 2004
  - Cadet (album), a 2001 studio album by the band, Cadet
- Cadets (1931 film), a German drama film directed by Georg Jacoby
- Cadets (1939 film), a German war film
- Cadet Records, a music record label

== People ==
- Cadet (rapper) (1990–2019), English rap musician
- Éliphène Cadet (born 1980), Haitian footballer
- Eliezer Cadet (born 1897), Haitian Vodou priest
- Jean Lud Cadet, Haitian-American psychiatrist

== Transportation ==
- Cadet (dinghy), a junior trainer sailing dinghy
- Cadet station, a Paris Metro station
- Aircore Cadet, an ultralight aircraft
- Baker-McMillan Cadet, a glider
- Nord Aviation N 500 Cadet, single-seat VTOL research aircraft built by Nord Aviation in 1967
- Slingsby Kirby Cadet, a British glider
- Wright Cadet, a right hand drive bus built on the DAF SB120 chassis

== Other ==
- Cadet (genealogy), a younger son
- Sea Cadets, international youth service relating to maritime activities.
- Cadets (youth program), youth programs sponsored by a military service or ministry of defence
- Cadet branch or cadet line, the male-line descendants of a monarch or patriarch's younger sons
- The Cadet (newspaper), the weekly student newspaper of the Virginia Military Institute
- Cadet (shipwreck), Lake George near Bolton in Warren County, New York
- Cadet, Missouri, an unincorporated community in Union Township, Washington County, Missouri, United States
- IBM 1620 or CADET, a 1959 inexpensive scientific computer
- International Cadet Australian Championship, a youth sailing competition
- Traffic cadet, someone who regulates traffic
- Cadet, a member of the historical Russian Constitutional Democratic Party
- Cadet, a member of The Cadets Drum and Bugle Corps

== See also ==
- The Cadets (disambiguation)
- Cadette (disambiguation)
- Kadet (disambiguation)
- Kadets (disambiguation)
