= Stephanie Roble =

American sailor (born 1989)

Personal information
- Nationality: American
- Born: March 31, 1989 (age 37) Lake Beulah, Wisconsin, U.S.

Sailing career
- Sport: Sailing
- Club: Kilroy Realty, Lake Beulah Yacht Club, Chicago Yacht Club
- Class: 49er FX
Medal record
Women's sailing
Representing the United States
World Championships
Bronze medal – third place	2014 Cork	Match race
Bronze medal – third place	2015 Middelfart	Match race
Bronze medal – third place	2020 Geelong	49er FX
Pan American Games
Silver medal – second place	2019 Lima	49er FX
Bronze medal – third place	2023 Santiago	49er FX

Stephanie Roble (/ˈroʊbəl/ ROH-bəl; born March 31, 1989) is an American sailor who is a Pan American Games medalist and a multi-medalist in the World Championships. She was named 2014 US Sailing Rolex Yachtswoman of Year.

== Career ==
After graduating from Old Dominion University, Roble dedicated herself to professional sports, being one of the founders of the Epic Racing team, in the Match Race category. As team captain, she won two bronze medals at the 2014 and 2015 World Championships, as well as being the 2014 champion of the Women's Match Racing International Series.

In 2019, Roble won the silver medal at the Pan American Games, in the 49er FX class. Her partner was her compatriot Maggie Shea. The team was defeated by the Brazilian Olympic champion duo, Martine Grael and Kahena Kunze, who won nine of the twelve races. Much more balanced was against Argentina's Victoria Travascio and María Sol Branz, which ended with an advantage of one point less lost to the Americans after the Argentines were disqualified from the medal race.

In 2020, Roble won her first major result at the international level, the bronze medal in the 49er & 49er FX World Championships of the 49er FX class, in Geelong, Australia. With this result, she and her partner Shea earned the right to represent the United States at the 2020 Summer Olympics in Tokyo.

In 2024, she qualified for the 2024 Summer Olympics, in 49erFX.
