= Maggie Shea =

American sailor (born 1989)

Personal information
- Full name: Margaret Shea
- Nationality: American
- Born: July 13, 1989 (age 37) Wilmette, Illinois, U.S.

Sailing career
- Sport: Sailing
- Club: Kilroy Realty, Chicago Yacht Club
- Class: 49er FX
Medal record
Women's sailing
Representing United States
World Championships
Bronze medal – third place	2014 Cork	Match race
Bronze medal – third place	2020 Geelong	49er FX
Pan American Games
Silver medal – second place	2019 Lima	49er FX
Bronze medal – third place	2023 Santiago	49er FX

Margaret "Maggie" Shea (/ʃeɪ/ SHAY; born July 13, 1989) is an American sailor who is a Pan American Games medallist and a two-time medallist in the World Championships.

== Career ==
After graduating from Connecticut College, where she led the Camels to a second-place finish in the 2011 ISCA Women's Finals, Shea dedicated herself to professional sports, being one of the founders of the Epic Racing team, in the Match Race category. As a member of the team, she won a bronze medal at the 2014 World Championships.

In 2019, Shea won the silver medal at the Pan American Games, in the 49er FX class. Her partner was her compatriot Stephanie Roble. The team was defeated by the Brazilian Olympic champion duo, Martine Grael and Kahena Kunze, who won nine of the twelve races. Much more balanced was against Argentina's Victoria Travascio and María Sol Branz, which ended with an advantage of one point less lost to the Americans after the Argentines were disqualified from the medal race.

In 2020, Shea won her first major result at the international level, the bronze medal in the 49er & 49er FX World Championships of the 49er FX class, in Geelong, Australia. With this result, she and her partner Roble earned the right to represent the United States at the 2020 Summer Olympics in Tokyo.
