= 49er & 49er FX North American Championships =

49er & 49er FX North American Championships are annual FX North American Championship sailing regattas in the 49er and the 49er FX classes organised by the International 49er Class Association.

== Editions ==
Year	City	Country	Dates	Events	Athletes	Nations	Notes
2013	Miami	United States	18–20 January	2			
2014	Miami	United States	18–20 January	2			
2015	Clearwater	United States	5–8 February	2			
2016	Newport	United States	26–28 August	2			
2017	Kingston	Canada	23–25 June	2			

== Medalists ==
=== 49er ===
Year	Gold	Silver	Bronze
2016 Newport	United States; Carlos Robles; Trevor Burd	United States; Judge Ryan; Hans Henken	United States; Andrew Mollerus; Matthew Mollerus
2017 Kingston	United States; Nevin Snow; Maximiliano Agnese	Canada; William Jones; Evan DePaul	Canada; Ryan Wood; Andrew Wood

=== 49er FX ===
Year	Gold	Silver	Bronze
2016 Newport	Canada; Arielle Morgan; Heather Wyatt	Canada; Alexandra ten Hove; Mariah Millen	United States; Sophie Vinnet; Naomi Flanagan
2017 Kingston	Canada; Erin Rafuse; Danielle Boyd	Spain; Carla Munte; Marta Munte	Japan; Anna Yamazaki; Sena Takano
