= Kadett (disambiguation) =

Kadett may refer to:

- Kadett, term used in Sweden to denote officer candidates studying in order to become an officer
- Opel Kadett, small family car produced by the German automobile manufacturer Opel
- Heinkel He 72 Kadett, a German single-engine biplane trainer of the 1930s

== See also ==
- Kadet (disambiguation)
- Kadets (disambiguation)
