= Victoria, Crown Princess of Sweden =

Heir apparent to the Swedish throne (born 1977)

Victoria
- Crown Princess of Sweden; Duchess of Västergötland
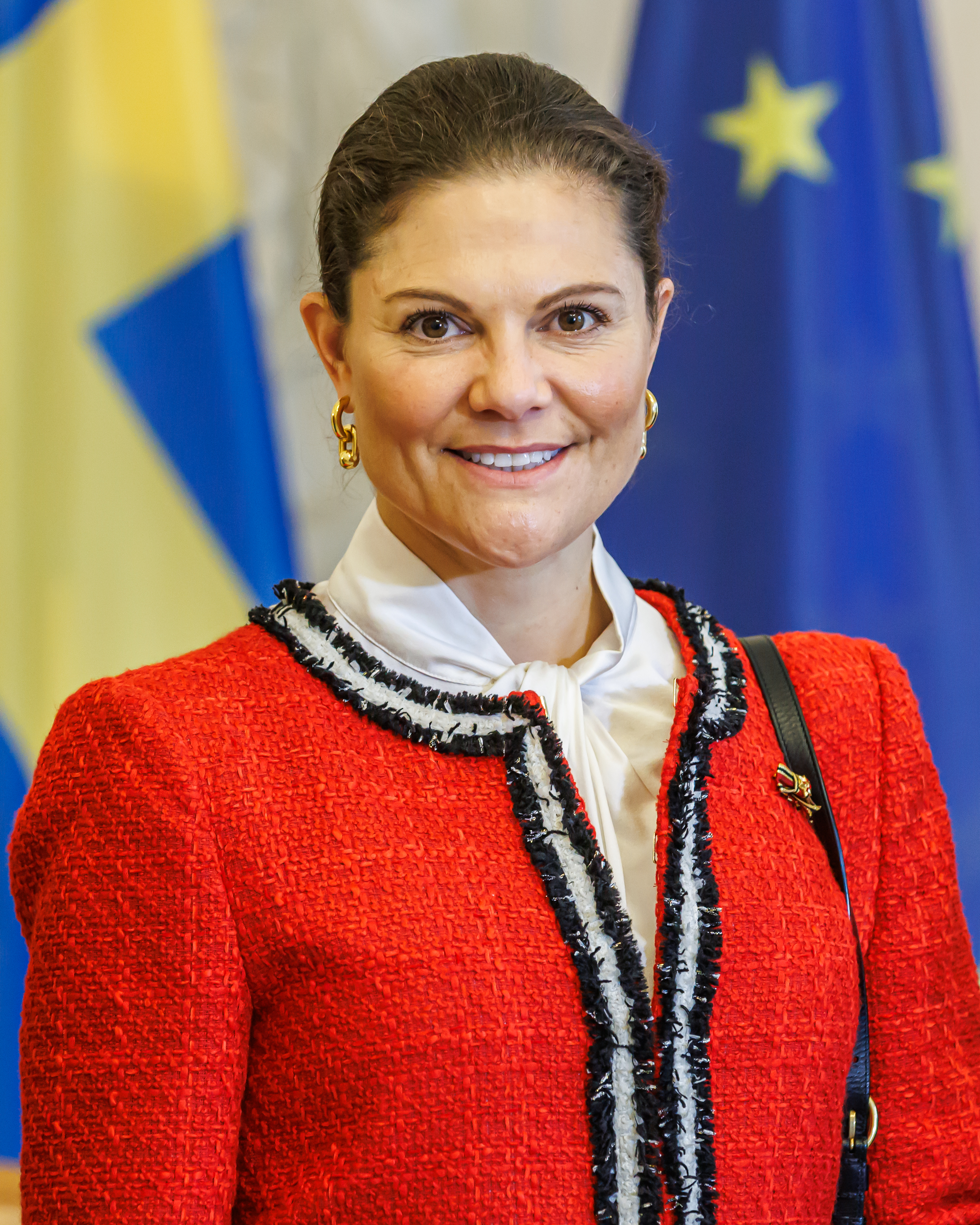
- Victoria in 2025
- Born: 14 July 1977 (age 49); Karolinska University Hospital, Solna, Sweden
- Spouse: Daniel Westling (m. 2010)
- Issue: Princess Estelle, Duchess of Östergötland; Prince Oscar, Duke of Skåne
Names
- Victoria Ingrid Alice Désirée
- House: Bernadotte
- Father: Carl XVI Gustaf
- Mother: Silvia Sommerlath
- Education: Uppsala University (BA); Yale University

Signature
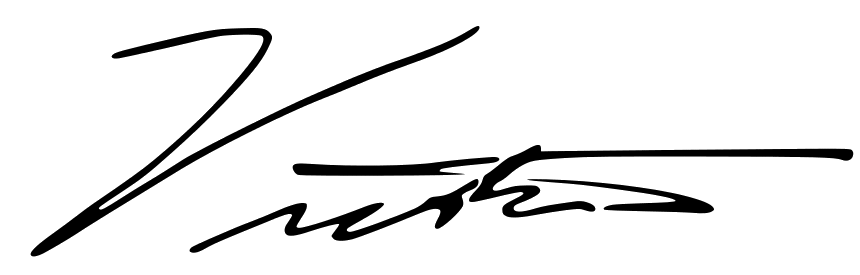

Victoria, Crown Princess of Sweden, Duchess of Västergötland (Victoria Ingrid Alice Désirée; born 14 July 1977) is the heir apparent to the Swedish throne as the eldest child of King Carl XVI Gustaf and Queen Silvia of Sweden. If she ascends to the throne as expected, she will be Sweden's fourth queen regnant (after Margaret, Christina and Ulrika Eleonora) and the first since 1720. Her inheritance is secured by Sweden's 1980 Act of Succession, the first law in Western Europe to adopt royal absolute primogeniture.

== Early life ==
Princess Victoria was born on 14 July 1977 at 21:45 CET at the Karolinska Hospital in Solna, Stockholm County, the first child of King Carl XVI Gustaf and Queen Silvia. She was baptised by Archbishop Olof Sundby at the Royal Palace Church on 27 September 1977. (Note: Victoria had four godparents identified at her baptism: Harald V (then the Crown Prince of Norway); her maternal uncle Ralf Sommerlath; Beatrix of the Netherlands (then a princess); her paternal aunt Princess Désirée, Baroness Silfverschiöld) At this time she was also conferred with the additional names of Ingrid, Alice, and Désirée, after relatives on both sides of the family. (Note: She was named: Ingrid after her father's aunt Ingrid of Sweden, who had been Queen Consort of Denmark from 1947–1972; Alice after her maternal grandmother Alice Sommerlath; and Désirée after both the first Bernadotte queen, Désirée Clary and her paternal aunt Princess Désirée, Baroness Silfverschiöld.)

Princess Victoria was heir presumptive until 13 May 1979, when her younger brother Prince Carl Philip was born. He was the Crown Prince and heir apparent for about seven months until 1 January 1980, when an amendment to the 1810 Act of Succession came into effect. It replaced the previous system of agnatic primogeniture (male-only inheritance) with absolute primogeniture (oldest child inherits regardless of sex). It established Victoria as the Crown Princess of Sweden, and she was also made the Duchess of Västergötland. Carl XVI Gustaf objected to the reform being retroactive, as he felt his son should not have been stripped of the Crown Prince title after it had already been bestowed upon him.

The family initially lived in a private apartment at Stockholm Palace, but moved to Drottningholm Palace about a year before the birth of Victoria's younger sister Princess Madeleine on 10 June 1982.

Victoria was confirmed in the summer of 1992 at Räpplinge church on the island of Öland.

For upper secondary school she attended Enskilda Gymnasiet, where she studied natural and social sciences. She graduated in 1996.

== Education ==
From 1982-1984 Victoria began her education at Västerled Parish Preschool. In the autumn of 1984, she entered Smedslättsskolan in Bromma, completed in the junior level. She later studied for a year (1996–97) at the Catholic University of the West at Angers in France, and in the fall term of 1997 participated in a special program following the work of the Riksdag. From 1998 to 2000, Victoria resided in the United States, where she studied various subjects at Yale University.

In May 1999, she was an intern at the Swedish Embassy in Washington, D.C. Victoria completed a study program at the Government Offices in 2001. In 2003, Victoria's education continued with visits to Swedish businesses, a study and intern program in agriculture and forestry, as well as completion of the basic soldier training at SWEDINT (the Swedish Armed Forces International Centre).

In 2006, Victoria enrolled in the Ministry for Foreign Affairs' Diplomat Program, running from September 2006 to June 2007. The program is a training program for young future diplomats and gives an insight to the ministry's work, Swedish foreign and security policies and Sweden's relations with the rest of the world. In June 2009, she graduated with a bachelor's degree in peace and conflict studies from Uppsala University.

She speaks Swedish, English, French and German.

In August 2024 the Crown Princess started officer training at the Swedish Defence University. This training will take around 20 months to complete and has the goal of teaching the Crown Princess about military strategy and tactics, as well as preparing her for her future role as head of state which includes representing the Armed Forces.

== Personal life ==
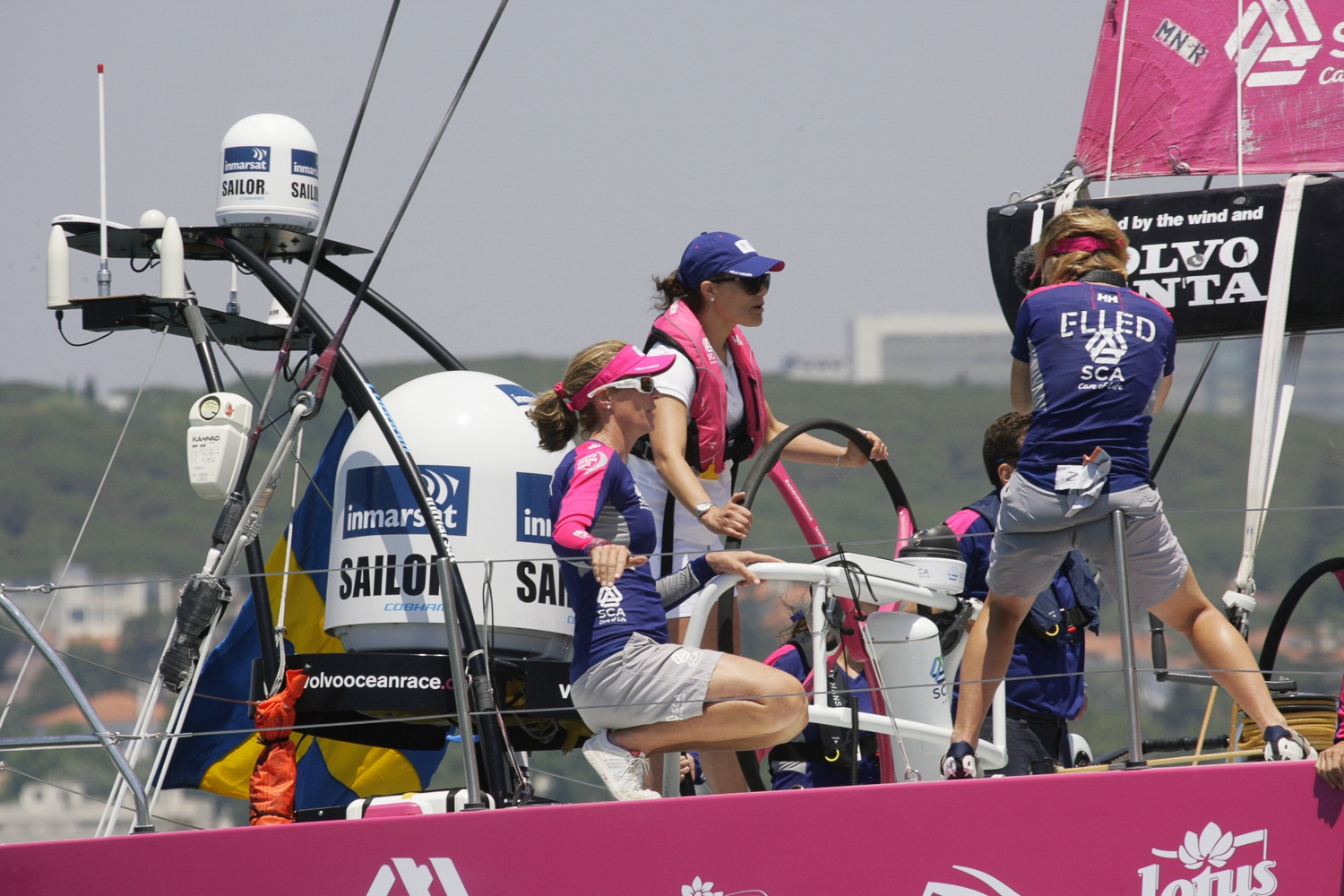
Victoria sailing

Victoria's first boyfriend was Daniel Collert. They socialised in the same circles, went to the same school and were already friends when their romance developed in the mid-1990s. When Victoria moved to the United States in 1998 to study and recover from her eating disorders, Collert moved with her and settled in New York. In September 2000, Victoria's relationship with Collert was confirmed in an interview with her at Expo 2000. The relationship ended in 2001.

=== Relationship with Daniel Westling ===
In the early 2000s, Victoria joined a gym upon the advice of her sister Madeleine. There she worked with personal trainer Daniel Westling; they eventually started a romantic relationship which was kept secret for about six months.

In May 2002, Swedish newspaper Expressen reported that Victoria and Daniel were dating. When the news broke and the media turned its attention on him, it was obvious that he did not like being in the public eye. He was photographed crossing a street against a red light in order to avoid a camera. In July 2002, Victoria and Westling were pictured kissing for the first time at a birthday party for Caroline Kreuger, a friend of Victoria's.

In Tre dagar med Victoria, which profiled her work during a three-day period that aired on TV4 in December 2004, Victoria commented on criticism directed at Westling, "Many unfair things are written." Victoria also gave her opinion that happiness is important, and that these days it is not so much about background and pedigree but about two people who have to live with each other. She said that if they are not happy and comfortable with each other, it is impossible to do a good job.

=== Engagement ===
Swedish media often speculated about upcoming engagements and marriages for Victoria. On 24 February 2009, rumours that wedding plans were imminent became particularly intense preceding an information council between the King and Prime Minister Fredrik Reinfeldt. Under the terms of the Swedish Act of Succession, the Government, upon the request of the King, gives the final consent for a dynastic marriage of a prince or princess of Sweden. The prince or princess otherwise loses their right to the throne. Later that day, it was confirmed that permission had been granted and that Victoria would marry Westling in the summer of 2010. The wedding date was set in Stockholm Cathedral for 19 June 2010, the 34th anniversary of her parents' marriage. Her engagement ring features a solitaire round brilliant-cut diamond mounted in white gold.

=== Marriage and children ===
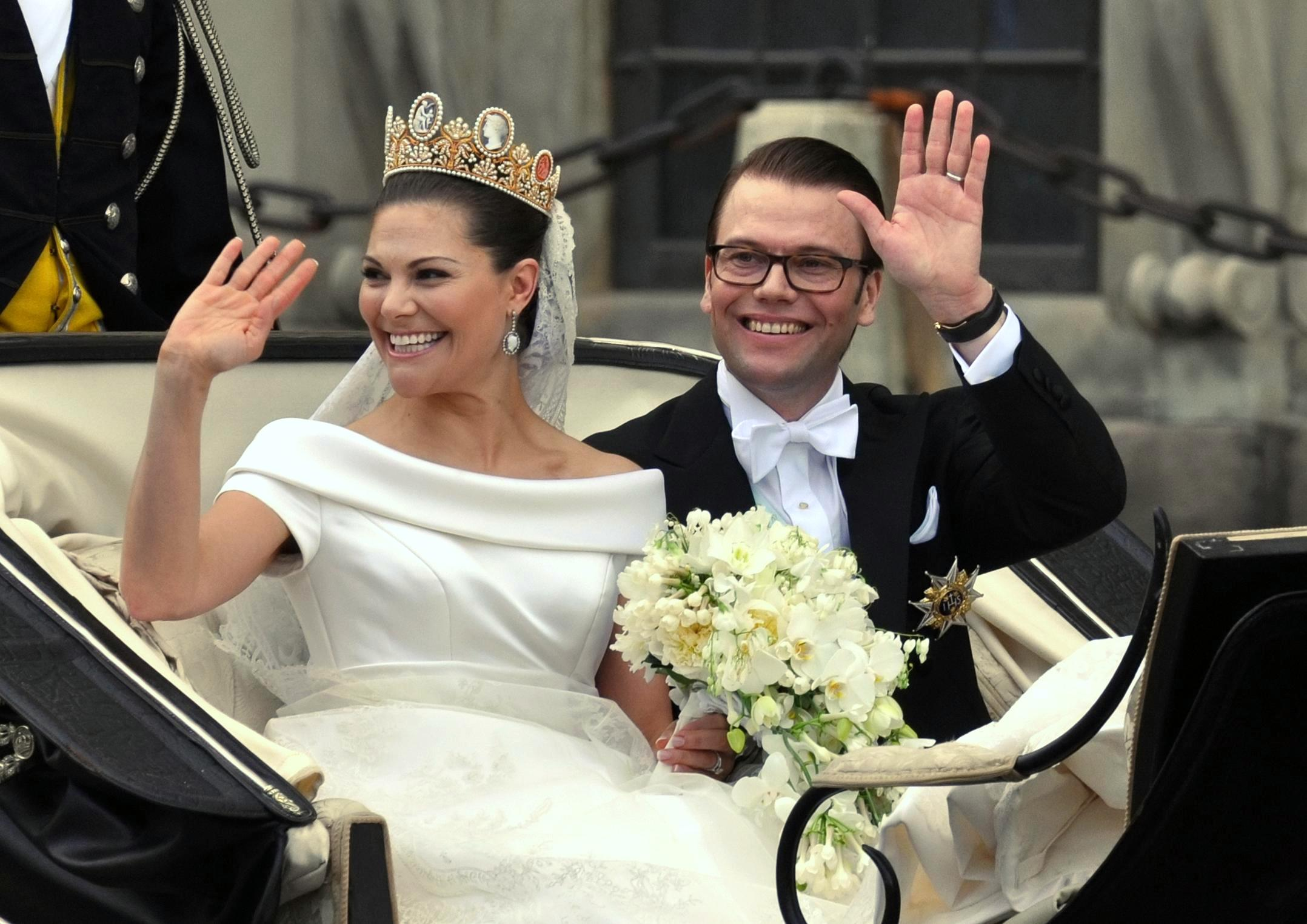
The Crown Princess and Prince Daniel on their wedding day

The wedding took place on 19 June 2010. Guests including royalty and ambassadors from various countries were invited to the wedding ceremony which took place at Stockholm Cathedral. After the wedding the newlyweds were driven through Stockholm in a coach and then rowed in the antique royal barge Vasaorden to the royal palace where the wedding banquet was held. On the evening before the wedding, there was a gala concert dedicated to the couple in the Stockholm Concert Hall.

In 2011, it was announced that Victoria would continue working throughout her pregnancy. In 2012, she took her maternity leave one day prior to the birth of her daughter Estelle and her husband Daniel revealed that he would take his paternity leave and switch parental roles with Victoria when Estelle began preschool.

The couple has two children:

- Princess Estelle Silvia Ewa Mary, Duchess of Östergötland (born on 23 February 2012 in Karolinska University Hospital, Solna).
- Prince Oscar Carl Olof, Duke of Skåne (born on 2 March 2016 in Karolinska University Hospital, Solna).

The couple also have a dog named Rio, which garnered attention in Sweden due to the dog being mixed bred Cavapoo.

=== Health ===
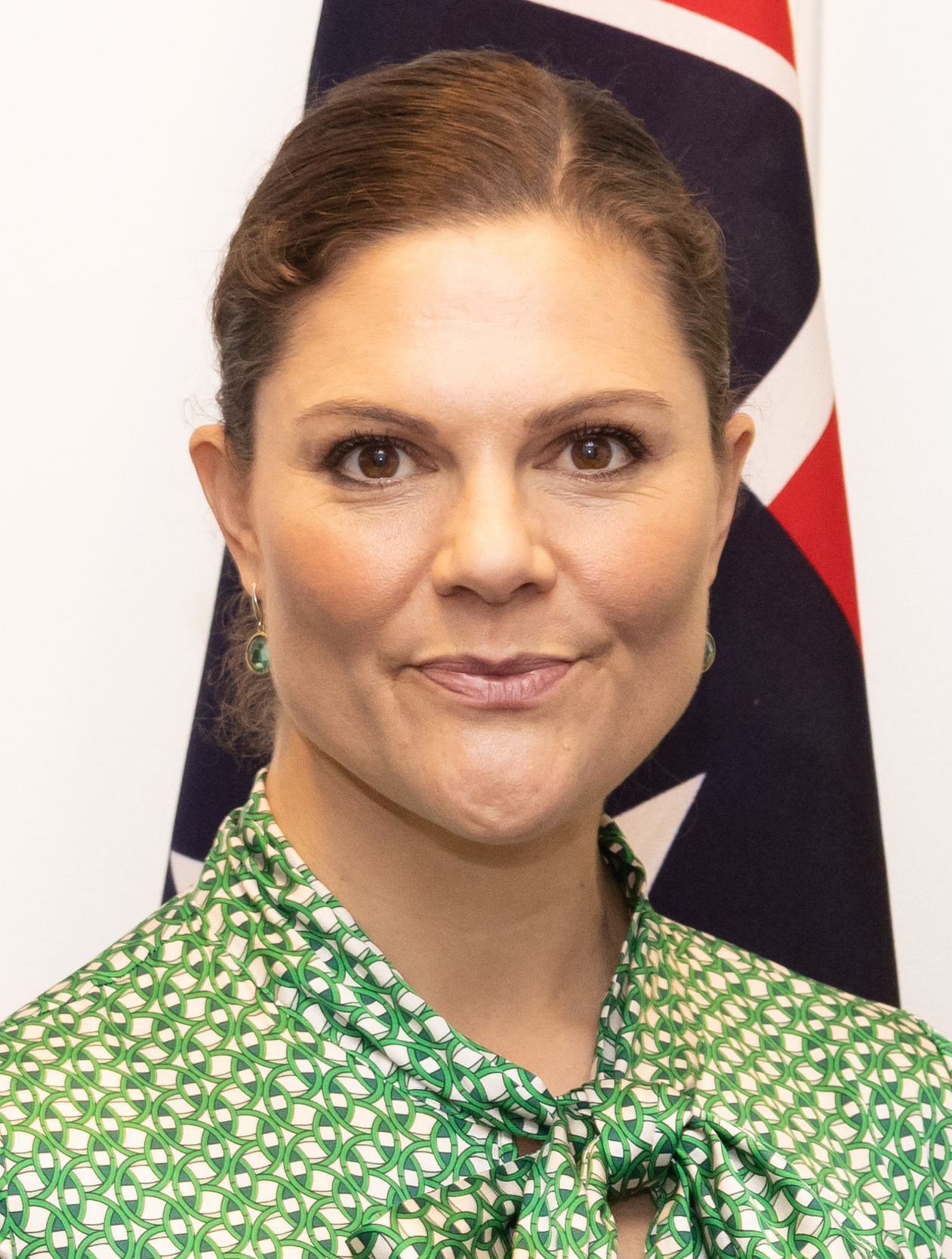
Victoria in 2023

Victoria has dyslexia, like her father King Carl XVI Gustaf and her brother Prince Carl Philip.

In 1996, it was established that Victoria had anorexia; this was not confirmed until the next year. Victoria had planned to study at Uppsala University, but after intense media speculation and public discussion when pictures of an evidently emaciated Victoria in sleeveless dresses at the Order of the Innocence's ball and the gala dinner for the incoming state visit from Austria surfaced in April 1997, the Royal Court decided to confirm her condition.

After a press release from the Royal Court in November 1997 announced that Victoria had eating disorders, she moved to the United States where she received professional treatment and studied at Yale University. In a 1998 interview, she thanked the media for giving her space during her recovery.

In June 1999, Victoria stated she had recovered and reflected about the difficulty of the illness, "not only for the individual but also for the people close to him or her."

In November 2002, the book Victoria, Victoria! came out, speaking further about her eating disorder. Victoria said: "I felt like an accelerating train, going right down... during the whole period. I had eating disorders and was aware of it, my anguish was enormous. I really hated how I looked like, how I was... I, Victoria, didn't exist. It felt like everything in my life and around me was controlled by others. The one thing I could control was the food I put in me". She further said that "What happened cost and I was the one who stood for the payments. Now I'm feeling well and with the insights I've acquired through this I can hopefully help someone else".

Victoria has prosopagnosia, which makes it difficult to recognize familiar faces. In a 2008 interview, she called it a "big drawback" in her capacity as heir to the throne.

== Public life ==
=== Within Sweden ===
Victoria's declaration of majority took place in the Hall of State at the Royal Palace of Stockholm on 14 July 1995. As of the day she turned 18, she became eligible to act as Head of State when the King is not in country. Victoria made her first public speech on this occasion swearing allegiance to her father the King and to uphold the laws and constitution of Sweden. Located on the dais in the background was the same silver throne on which her father was seated at his enthronement, in actual use from 1650 and up until this ceremony.

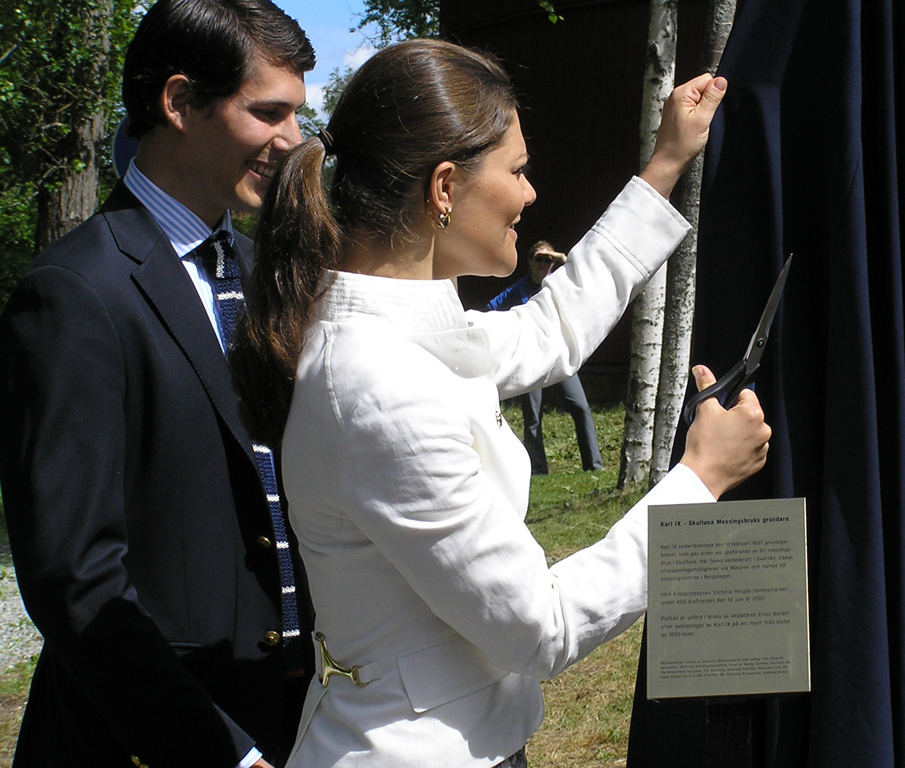
Crown Princess Victoria at Skultuna Messingsbruk with the managing director Viktor Blomqvist

Crown Princess Victoria was given her own household in October 2004. It is headed by the Marshal of the Court, and serves to coordinate the official engagements of The Crown Princess.

As heir apparent to the throne, Victoria is a working member of the Swedish Royal Family with her own agenda of official engagements. Victoria attends the regular Advisory Council on Foreign Affairs and the Council of State with Government ministers headed by the King, and steps in as a temporary regent (Riksföreståndare) when needed.

When Social Democrat Magdalena Andersson was elected as Swedens first female prime minister in 2021, Victoria stated that it was "about time" and that Andersson would become an "important symbol".

=== Outside Sweden ===
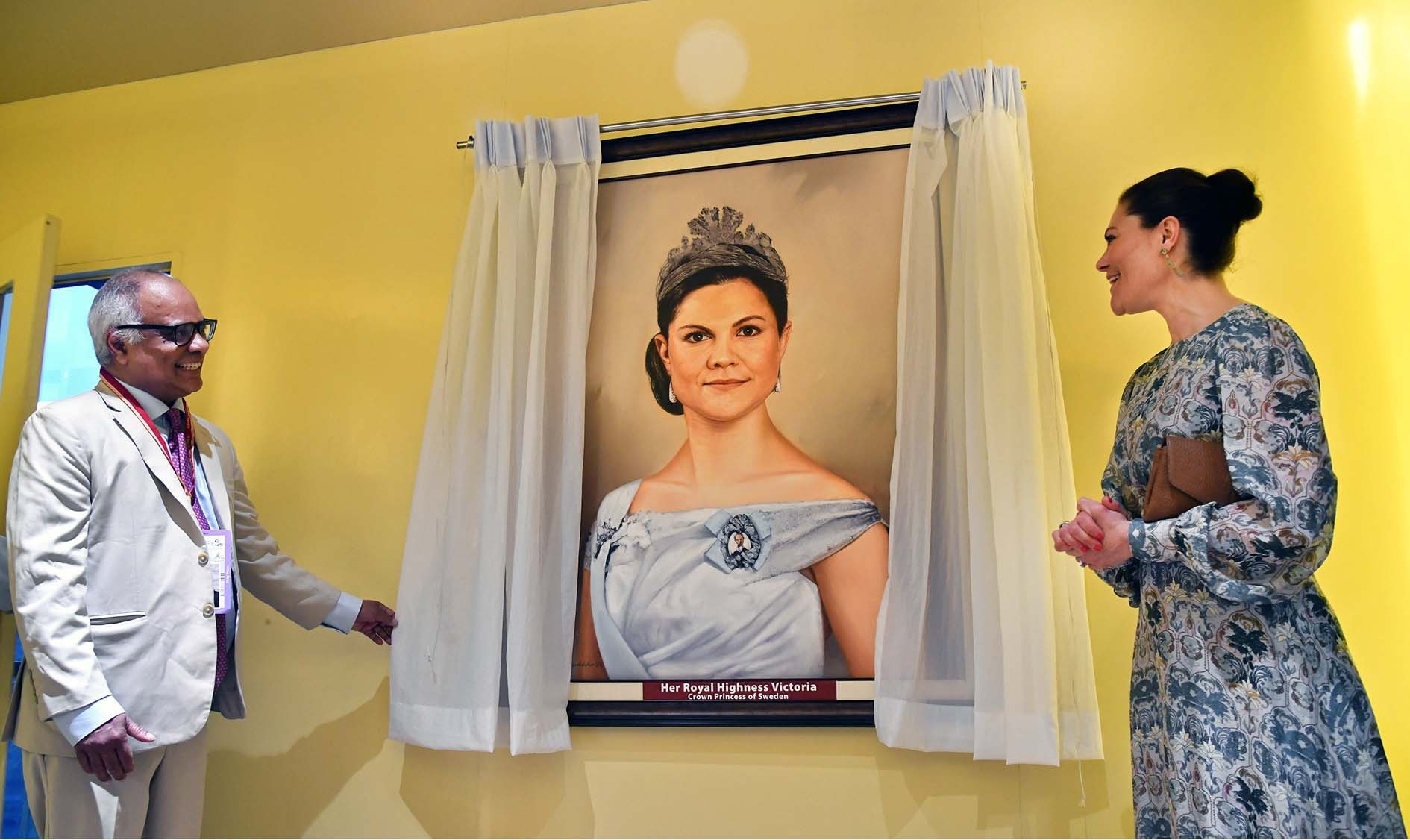
Crown Princess Victoria inaugurates the Crown Princess Victoria Room at the Asian University for Women

Victoria's first major official visit on her own was to Japan in 2001, where she promoted Swedish tourism, design, music, gastronomy and environmental sustainability. That same year, Victoria also travelled to the West Coast of the United States, where she participated in the celebrations of the Nobel centenary.

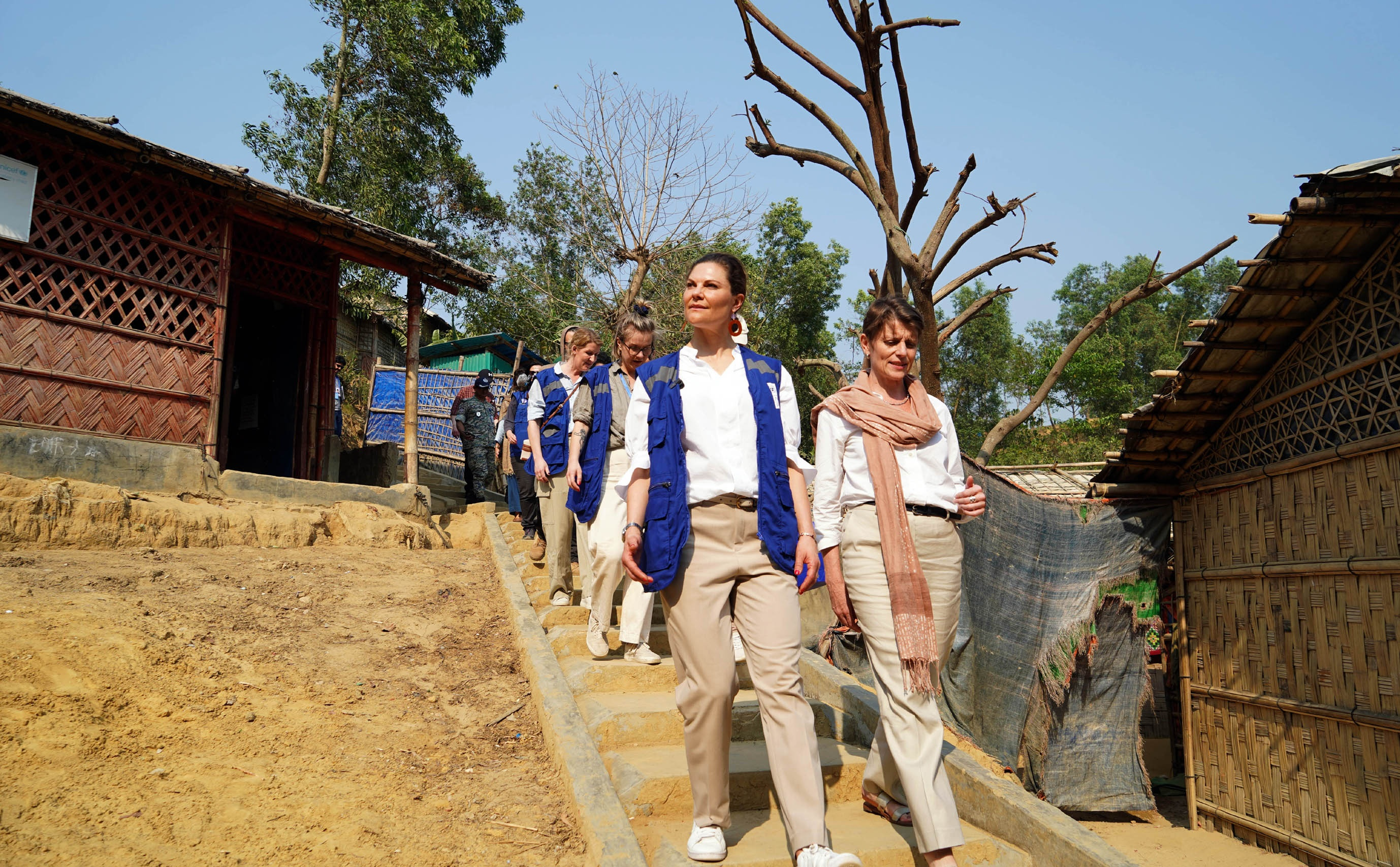
Crown Princess Victoria visiting the Rohingya Camp at Ukhia, Cox's Bazar

In 2002, she paid official visits to United States, Spain, Uganda, Ethiopia, and Kosovo where she visited Camp Victoria. In 2003, she made official visits to Egypt and the United States. In early 2004, she paid an official visit to Saudi Arabia, as a part of a large official business delegation from Sweden, and in October 2004, she travelled to Hungary. In January 2005, Victoria made an extended official visit to Australia, promoting Swedish style and businesses, and in April she visited Bangladesh and Sri Lanka to follow aid work and become informed about the work in the aftermath of the tsunami. In April 2005, Victoria made an official visit to Japan where she visited the Expo 2005 in Aichi, laid the foundation for a new IKEA store in Yokohama together with Princess Takamado and met with Emperor Akihito, Empress Michiko, Crown Prince Naruhito and Sayako Kuroda. In June 2005, Victoria travelled to Turkey on a visit where she participated in the Swedish Business Seminar and Sweden Day celebrations in Ankara during a historic visit, which was organised by the Swedish Embassy in Ankara and Swedish Trade Council in Istanbul. Victoria also visited the historic sights such as the Blue Mosque, Topkapı Palace and Hagia Sophia. This was the first official Royal visit from Sweden to Turkey since 1934. In September 2005, she made an official visit to China.

In March 2006, Victoria made an official visit to Brazil where she followed the Volvo Ocean Race and visited projects supported by the World Childhood Foundation, such as the Abrigo Rainha Sílvia. In December, she paid a four-day visit to Paris where she attended a French-Swedish soirée arranged by the Swedish Chamber of Commerce, the Swedish Trade Council and the Swedish Embassy, during which she also awarded the Prix d'Excellence 2006. The visit to Paris also included events with the Swedish Club in Paris, attendance at a church service in the Sofia Church (the Swedish church in Paris), a study visit to the OECD headquarters and meetings with the Secretary-General José Ángel Gurría, the Swedish Ambassador to the OECD, Gun-Britt Andersson, and other senior officials. She also attended a gala dinner hosted by La Fondation Pour L'Enfance at Versailles.

In October 2015, Victoria and Daniel completed a five-day official visit of Peru and Colombia. In February 2023, they toured Australia and New Zealand.

When Sweden became a member of NATO in 2024, the crown princess attended Sweden's flag-raising ceremony outside the NATO Headquarters in Brussels.

== Charity work ==
=== Patronages ===
She has been patron of Astrid Lindgren Children's Hospital since 1998.

She is patron of Act Church of Sweden, the international development and humanitarian arm of the Church of Sweden. She was also patron of its precursor organisation Lutherhjälpen.

=== The Crown Princess Victoria's Fund ===
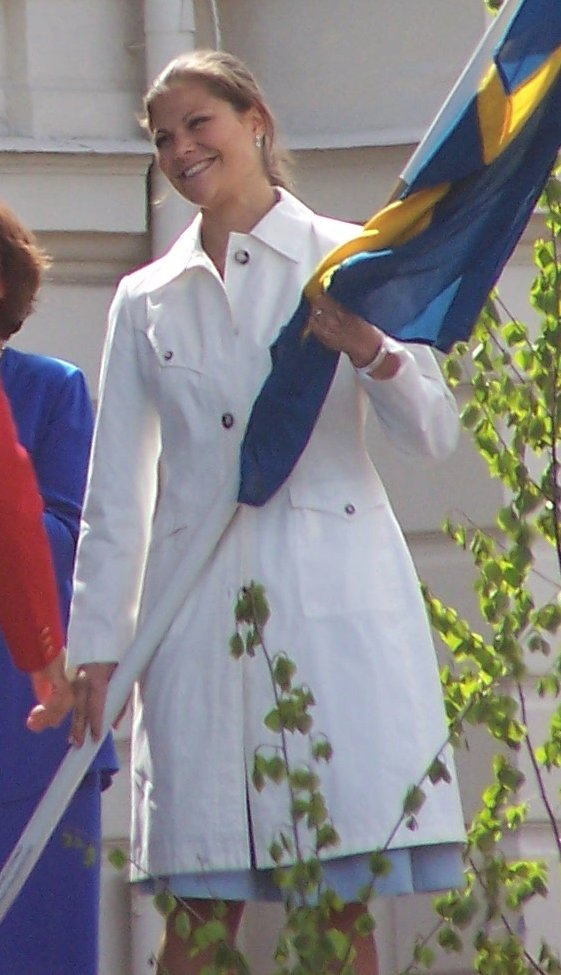
Crown Princess Victoria on the National Day of Sweden, 2006

The Crown Princess Victoria's Fund was set up in 1997 and is run as a part of Radiohjälpen, the fundraising branch of Sveriges Television and Sveriges Radio. The fund's aim is to provide support for leisure and recreational activities for children and young people with functional disabilities or chronic illnesses.

The Crown Princess Victoria Fund's means mainly derive from donations by the public, but large companies such as Arla Foods, Swedbank and AB Svenska Returpack are constant sponsor partners. Additional support comes from The Association of Swedish Bakers & Confectioners who every year arrange a national "princess cake week" during which the participating cafés and bakeries give 2.50 SEK per sold princess pastry and 10 SEK per sold princess cake to the fund. The result of this fund-raising drive is usually presented to Victoria herself on her name day on 12 March every year; in 2007, the total amount was 200,000 SEK. Congratulatory and memorial cards are also issued by Radiohjälpen benefitting the fund. In 2006, The Crown Princess Victoria Fund raised a total of 5.5 million SEK.

Every year Victoria visits one or several clubs or projects that have been granted money. These visits are not announced in advance via the official royal diary but kept private. Sveriges Television often accompanies her and airs short programs from these visits at some time during the year.

=== Environmental causes ===
Victoria has been passionate about the environment and climate change for a number of years.

She has studied climate change and polar science, the latter in a course at She took a course at Stockholm University in 2013. Alongside Crown Princess Mette-Marit of Norway, Victoria participated in the Global Climate March of 2015.

In January 2016, UN Secretary General Ban Ki-moon appointed the crown princess as a member of Sustainable Development Goals (SDG) Advocates for Agenda 2030. She became one of 16 ambassadors in the SDG Advocacy Group.

In June 2023, she boarded the icebreaker Oden to visit Svalbard, where the effects of climate change are dramatically altering the archipelago and its ecosystems. In October of that same year, Victoria was appointed as a UNDP Goodwill Ambassador in October 2023. The following March, she made her first trip as part of the role. She visited Bangladesh where she met with farmers who had been affected by climate change. She also learned about initiatives that support climate-vulnerable women.

In April 2025, Victoria joined a Seafood Business for Ocean Stewardship (SeaBOS) meeting. The group works to enact sustainable seafood practices.

=== Sport ===
Victoria and Daniel established Generation Pep to mark the occasion of their marriage in 2010. The focus of the non-profit foundation is to combat exclusion and promote good health among children and young people in Sweden. It awards one school each year for inclusive and accessible promotion of physical activity . Schools can also earn a certification for creating initiatives to increase movement and sport participation amongst its students.

She is a member of the Honorary Board of the International Paralympic Committee.

=== LGBTQ rights ===
In 2013, Victoria became the first member of the Swedish royal family to take a position on LGBTQ rights. She made a surprise appearance at the Gaygalan Awards to present an award to Jonas Gardell for his Don't Ever Wipe Tears Without Gloves trilogy and TV series about the 1980s AIDS crisis.

In 2020, Victoria and her husband Daniel made an appearance at the national office of the RFSL, an LGBTQ organization that has been continuously operating in Sweden since 1950. This was the first visit to an LGBTQ organization by a member of the Swedish royal family. Later that year, she inaugurated Stockholm Pride, which had been moved online due to the COVID-19 pandemic, with a speech. She received the Hetero of the Year award at the 2021 Gaygala for her support of the LGBTQ community.

== Honours ==
Styles of Victoria
- Reference style: Her Royal Highness
- Spoken style: Your Royal Highness

=== National ===
- Sweden:
  - Dame Member and Commander with Collar of the Royal Order of the Seraphim (LoKavKMO) (since birth; received the insignia on 14 July 1995)
  - Member of the Royal Family Decoration of King Carl XVI Gustaf (14 July 1995)
  - Recipient of the King Carl XVI Gustaf's Jubilee Commemorative Medal IV (15 September 2023)
  - Recipient of the King Carl XVI Gustaf's Jubilee Commemorative Medal III (30 April 2016)
  - Recipient of the King Carl XVI Gustaf's Jubilee Commemorative Medal II (23 August 2013)
  - Recipient of the King Carl XVI Gustaf's Jubilee Commemorative Medal (30 April 1996)
  - Swedish National Defence College Commemorative Medal (Försvarshögskolans minnesmedalj) (9 January 2008)
  - Swedish Soldiers Homes Association Medal in Gold no 1 (Svenska Soldathemsförbundets medalj i guld, SSHFGM) (May 2021)

=== Foreign ===
- Austria: Grand Decoration of Honour in Gold with Sash for Services to the Republic of Austria (25 September 1997)
- Belgium: Grand Cordon of the Order of Leopold
- Brazil: Grand Cross of the Order of the Southern Cross
- Bulgaria: Grand Cross of the Order of the Balkan Mountains
- Chile: Grand Cross of the Order of Merit
- Denmark: Knight of the Order of the Elephant (14 July 1995)
- Estonia:
  - Member 1st Class of the Order of the Cross of Terra Mariana
  - Member 1st Class of the Order of the White Star
- Finland: Grand Cross with Collar of the Order of the White Rose of Finland
- France:
  - Grand Officer of the Order of the Legion of Honour (30 January 2024)
  - Grand Cross of the Order of National Merit
- Germany: Grand Cross 1st class of the Order of Merit of the Federal Republic of Germany
- Greece: Grand Cross of the Order of Honour
- Iceland: Grand Cross of the Order of the Falcon
- Italy: Knight Grand Cross of the Order of Merit of the Italian Republic
- Japan: Grand Cordon of the Order of the Chrysanthemum
- Jordan: Grand Cordon of the Supreme Order of the Renaissance
- Latvia: Grand Officer of the Order of the Three Stars
- Lithuania: Commander's Grand Cross of the Order of Gediminas
- Luxembourg: Grand Cross of the Order of Adolphe of Nassau
- Malaysia: Honorary Grand Commander of the Order of the Defender of the Realm
- Monaco:
  - Officer of the Order of Grimaldi
  - Recipient of the Prince Albert II Investiture Medal
- Netherlands: Knight Grand Cross of the Order of the Lion of the Netherlands (11 October 2022)
- Norway: Grand Cross of the Order of St. Olav (1 July 1995)
- Romania: Grand Cross of the Order of the Star of Romania
- South Korea: Gwanghwa Medal of the Order of Diplomatic Service Merit
- Spain: Dame Grand Cross of the Royal Order of Isabella the Catholic (16 November 2021)
- Tunisia: Grand Officer of the Order of the Republic

=== Military ranks ===
- (Sweden) 19 August 2024 – 12 March 2025 Cadet
- (Sweden) 12 March 2025: Second Lieutenant

== See also ==
- List of current heirs apparent

== Notes ==
Victoria, Crown Princess of Sweden House of Bernadotte Born: 14 July 1977
Swedish royalty
Preceded by Carl Philip as Crown Prince	Crown Princess of Sweden; 1980–present	Incumbent
Vacant Title last held by Carl	Duchess of Västergötland; 1980–present	Incumbent
Lines of succession
First Heir apparent	Succession to the Swedish throne 1st in line	Followed by Princess Estelle
