= Sailing at the 2023 Pan American Games – Nacra 17 =

Nacra 17 at the 2023 Pan American Games
- Venue: Cofradia Nautica del Pacifico
- Dates: October 28 - November 3
- Competitors: 10 from 5 nations

Medalists
Gold medal	Mateo Majdalani; Eugenia Bosco	Argentina
Silver medal	David Liebenberg; Sarah Newberry-Moore	United States
Bronze medal	Samuel Albrecht; Gabriela Nicolino	Brazil

The Nacra 17 competition of the sailing events at the 2023 Pan American Games in Santiago was held from October 28 to Novembero 3 at the Cofradia Nautica del Pacifico.

Points were assigned based on the finishing position in each race (1 for first, 2 for second, etc.). The points were totaled from the top 11 results of the first 12 races, with lower totals being better. If a team was disqualified or did not complete the race, 6 points were assigned for that race (as there were 5 teams in this competition). The 5 teams competed in the final race, with placings counting double for final score. The team with the lowest total score won.

Mateo Majdalani and Eugenia Bosco from Argentina, who finished as runners-up in 2019, dominated the competition with 12 wins in 13 races, including the medal race. David Liebenberg and Sarah Newberry-Moore from the United States were the second, after defeating Samuel Albrecht and Gabriela Nicolino from Brazil in the medal race.

== Schedule ==
All times are (UTC-3).

Date	Time	Round
October 30, 2023	11:58	Races 1, 2, 3 and 4
October 31, 2023	15:15	Races 5 and 6
November 1, 2023	13:00	Races 7, 8 and 9
November 2, 2023	14:45	Races 10, 11 and 12
November 4, 2023	13:20	Medal race

== Results ==
The results were as below.
Race M is the medal race.

Rank	Athlete	Nation	Race													Total Points	Net Points
Rank	Athlete	Nation	1	2	3	4	5	6	7	8	9	10	11	12	M	Total Points	Net Points
1st place, gold medalist(s)	Mateo Majdalani; Eugenia Bosco	Argentina	1	1	1	1	1	1	1	2	1	1	1	1	2	15	13
2nd place, silver medalist(s)	David Liebenberg; Sarah Newberry Moore	United States	(3)	3	2	2	2	2	2	3	2	2	3	3	4	33	30
3rd place, bronze medalist(s)	Samuel Albrecht; Gabriela Nicolino	Brazil	2	2	(3)	3	3	3	3	1	3	3	2	2	6	36	33
4	Galen Richardson; Madeline Gillis	Canada	(5)	5	4	5	4	4	4	4	4	4	3	4	10	61	56
5	Sebastián Fuenzalida; Pipa Cisternas	Chile	4	4	(5)	4	5	5	5	5	5	5	5	5	8	65	60
