= Donald Dean Summerville =

Canadian politician (1915–1963)

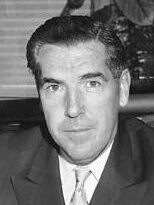

53rd Mayor of Toronto
- In office 1 January 1963 – 19 November 1963
- Preceded by: Nathan Phillips
- Succeeded by: Phil Givens

Toronto Ward 8 Alderman
- In office 1955–1958

Toronto Board of Control
- In office 1959–1961

Personal details
- Born: 4 August 1915 Toronto, Ontario
- Died: 19 November 1963 (aged 48) Toronto, Ontario
- Party: Progressive Conservative
- Spouse: Alice Summerville
- Relatives: William Summerville (father)
- Profession: Politician; real estate manager

Donald Dean Summerville (4 August 1915 – 19 November 1963) was a Canadian politician who served as the 53rd mayor of Toronto from January 1963 until his death that same year.

== Early life and family ==
Summerville was born in Toronto to William Arthur Summerville and Alberta White in 1915. He had an older brother, Ross, who died as an infant in 1910.

Summerville served as a pilot for the Royal Canadian Air Force during World War II, and is reputed to have bombed the Canadian National Exhibition grounds in Toronto by mistake during training. Before public office he was manager of family owned real estate company Summerville Properties (founded 1912).

His father, William Summerville had been a city councillor and Conservative Member of Provincial Parliament for Riverdale from 1937 to 1943. His widow, Alice Summerville, was elected alderman, in her own right, representing Ward 8 in the Beaches from 1965 to 1966, and Ward 9 until 1969, when she came in third in the municipal election. His great-nephew, Paul Summerville (born in England to his nephew Paul William Summerville), an economist, was the New Democratic Party's candidate in the St. Paul's electoral district for the 2006 federal election. He later resigned from the NDP and joined the Liberal Party of Canada. He was the Liberal candidate in the 2012 federal by-election in British Columbia's Victoria electoral district.

== Political career ==
He was first elected to city council in 1955 as the alderman for Ward 8, in east-end Toronto, that included The Beaches neighbourhood. He served until 1958, then he was elected to the Toronto Board of Control – the city hall executive council – in 1959 and served until 1961. He was elected mayor of Toronto in December 1962 and took office on New Year's Day 1963.

On 19 November 1963, Summerville suffered a fatal heart attack while playing in a charity hockey game at the George Bell Arena in the west-end Toronto neighbourhood known as The Junction. The fire department arrived about three minutes after it was called, but because ambulances in the area were already on call, an ambulance had to be dispatched from Yonge Street at Davenport Road (about five miles or eight kilometres away from George Bell Arena) and did not arrive until about 15 minutes after it was called, arriving at 8:55 p.m. At very high speeds, he was rushed to St. Joseph Hospital in the High Park area, and died there at 9:05 p.m. Mayor Philip Givens, who succeeded Summerville, called for an inquest into why the emergency response was so slow. The inquiry into the emergency response to his death found that the closest ambulance was not sent because its service did not have jurisdiction over The Junction and so was not called.

That led to the creation of the Department of Emergency Services and the amalgamation of Metropolitan Toronto's various local ambulance services.

== Funeral ==
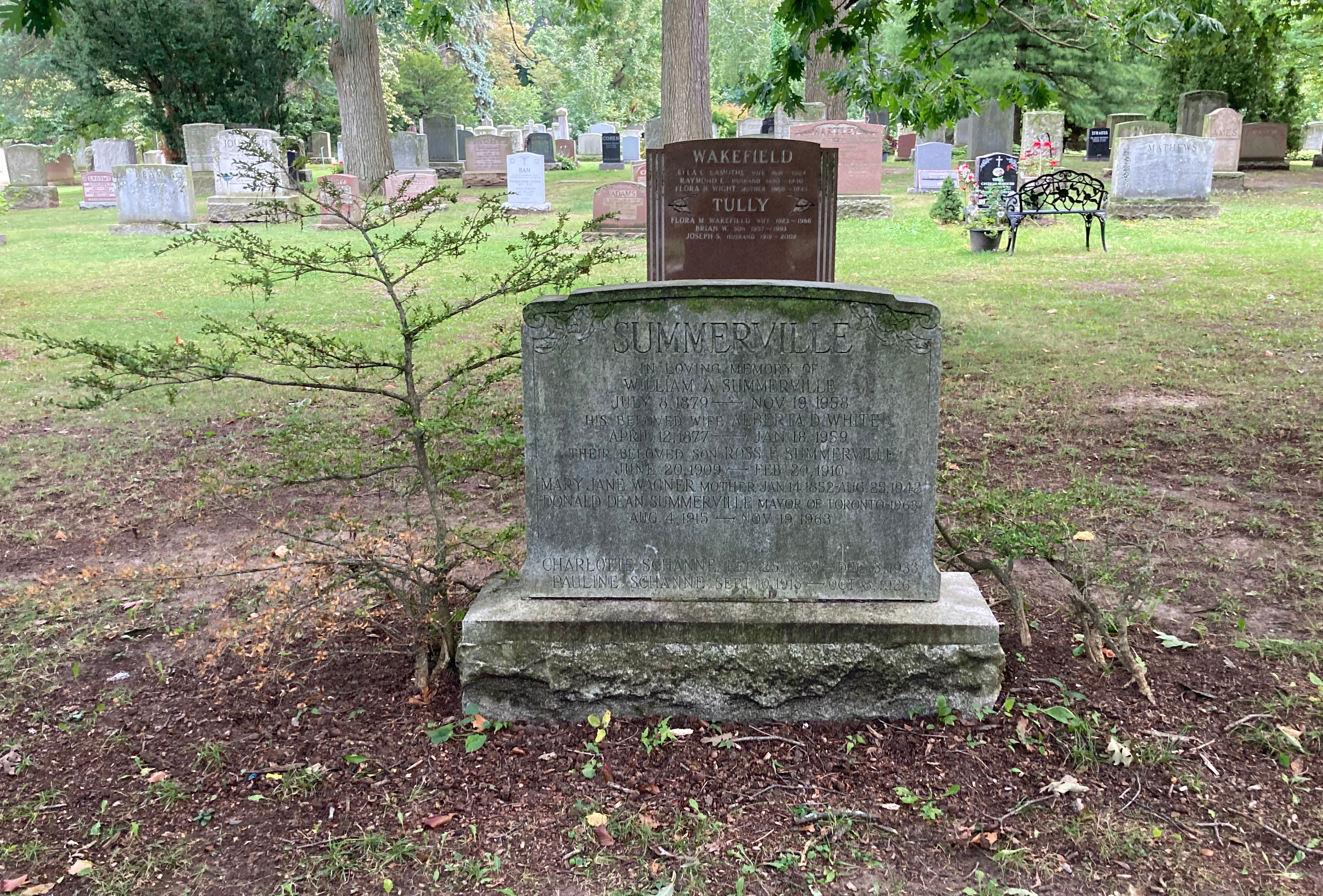
Summerville's grave at Mount Pleasant Cemetery

Summerville's body was initially at Ralph Day Funeral Home, and then was moved to the council chambers at City Hall, followed by a funeral at St. James Cathedral. Summerville was the second of three mayors to lie in repose at City Hall – McBride was the first and former mayor Rob Ford was the third.

== Legacy ==
The Donald D. Summerville Olympic Pools (located on Woodbine Beach in east end Beaches neighbourhood), and the annual Donald Summerville Yacht Race, hosted by Ashbridge's Bay Yacht Club, are named after him.

A Toronto Community Housing Corporation apartment complex in the east end of Toronto near the Olympic pool is also named after him.

Summerville is buried in family plot at Mount Pleasant Cemetery, Toronto.
