= Sailing at the 2023 Pan American Games – 49er FX =

49erFX at the 2023 Pan American Games
- Venue: Cofradia Nautica del Pacifico
- Dates: October 28 – November 3
- Competitors: 10 from 5 nations

Medalists
Gold medal	Martine Grael; Kahena Kunze	Brazil
Silver medal	Alexandra Ten Hove; Mariah Millen	Canada
Bronze medal	Stephanie Roble; Maggie Shea	United States

The 49er FX competition of the sailing events at the 2023 Pan American Games in Santiago was held from October 28 to November 3 at the Cofradia Nautica del Pacifico.

Points were assigned based on the finishing position in each race (1 for first, 2 for second, etc.). The points were totaled from the top 11 results of the first 12 races, with lower totals being better. If a team was disqualified or did not complete the race, 6 points were assigned for that race (as there were 5 teams in this competition). The 5 teams competed in the final race, with placings counting double for final score. The team with the lowest total score won.

The defending champions, Martine Grael and Kahena Kunze from Brazil, won the event. Alexandra Ten Hove and Mariah Millen from Canada were the second, and Stephanie Roble and Maggie Shea from the United States won the bronze medal.

== Schedule ==
All times are (UTC-3).

Date	Time	Round
October 28, 2023	13:07	Races 1, 2 and 3
October 30, 2023	14:37	Races 4, 5 and 6
November 1, 2023	13:07	Races 7, 8 and 9
November 2, 2023	13:07	Races 10, 11 and 12
November 3, 2023	13:45	Medal race

== Results ==
The results were as below.
Race M is the medal race.

Rank	Athlete	Nation	Race													Total Points	Net Points
Rank	Athlete	Nation	1	2	3	4	5	6	7	8	9	10	11	12	M	Total Points	Net Points
1st place, gold medalist(s)	Martine Grael; Kahena Kunze	Brazil	3	1	1	(6); DSQ	1	1	1	2	3	3	1	3	2	28	22
2nd place, silver medalist(s)	Alexandra Ten Hove; Mariah Millen	Canada	1	3	3	4	3	2	3	1	2	1	2	1	4	30	26
3rd place, bronze medalist(s)	Stephanie Roble; Maggie Shea	United States	2	2	2	1	2	3	2	3	1	2	4	2	6	32	28
4	María Sol Branz; Julia Pantín	Argentina	4	4	4	2	(5)	4	4	4	4	4	3	4	8	54	49
5	Diana Tudela; Adriana Barrón	Peru	5	5	(6); OCS	3	4	5	5	5	5	5	5	5	10	68	62
