= Kadet (disambiguation) =

Kadet was a member of the Constitutional Democratic Party in the Russian Empire.

Kadet may also refer to:

- Kadet (TV channel), second children's channel of Medialaan-De Persgroep
- Kadet Remaja Sekolah Malaysia, a scout-like movement organised by the Government of Malaysia as a youth organisation
- Terveet Kädet, a Finnish hardcore punk band

== See also ==
- Cadet (disambiguation)
- Kadets (disambiguation)
- Kadett (disambiguation)
