= Scutt =

Scutt is a surname. Notable people with the surname include:

- Connor Scutt (born 1996) English darts player
- Der Scutt (1934–2010), American architect and designer
- Helena Scutt (born 1992), American competitive sailor
- Jocelynne Scutt (born 1947), Australian lawyer
- Michelle Scutt (born 1960), British Olympic athlete
- Steve Scutt (born 1956), English sprinter
- Tom Scutt (born 1983), British designer
