= Camp Victoria =

Military base

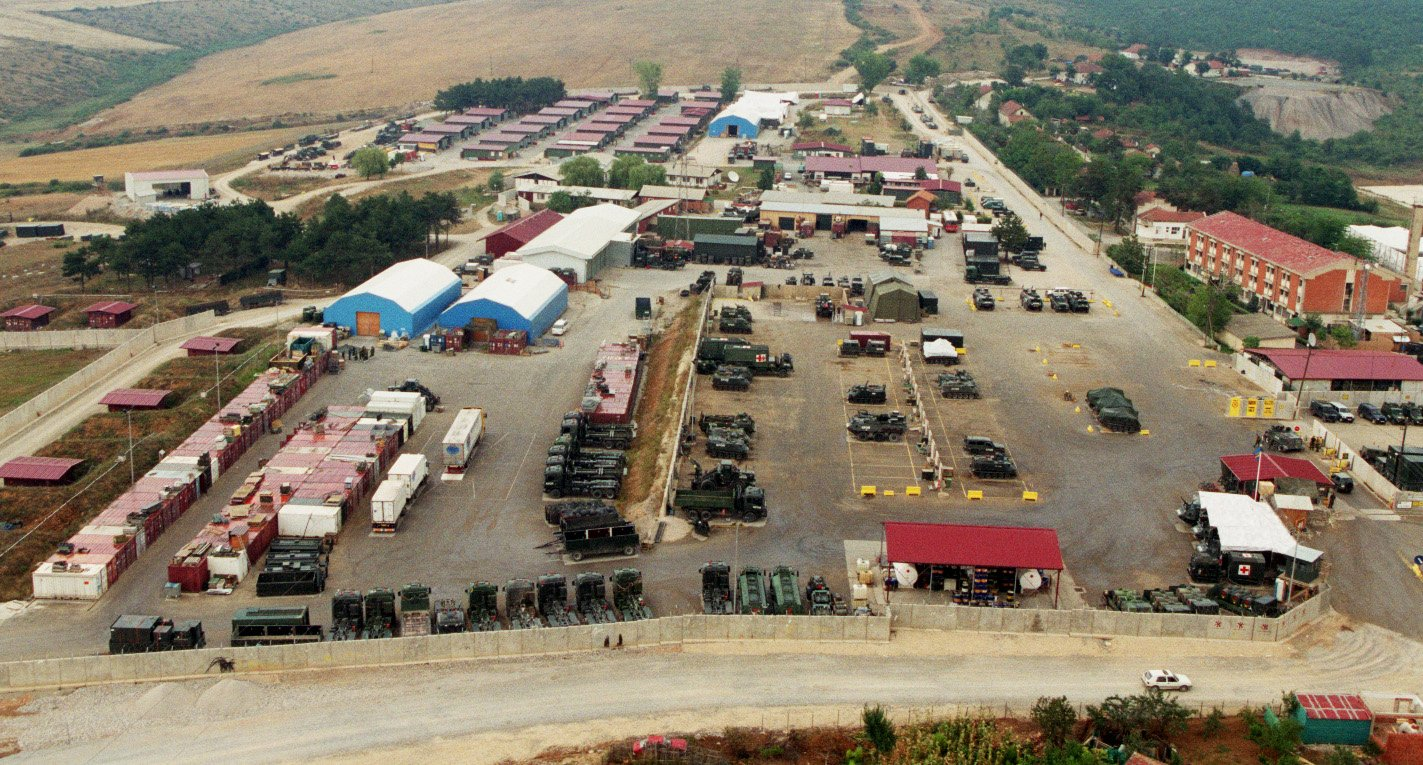
Aerial photograph, 2002

Camp Victoria was the Swedish camp where most of the Swedish soldiers in the international force in Kosovo were located. The camp was previously named Camp Gripen, but the name was changed in spring 2000. The camp is located in Hajvalia, south of Pristina. It was named for Victoria, Crown Princess of Sweden.

Most of the soldiers were Swedish, but there were also Irish, Czech, Finnish and Latvian soldiers. In June 2004, the total number of personnel was about 450 persons, out of which 329 came from Sweden, while the camp housed 700 soldiers in 2002.

Most of the soldiers belonged to the Swedish mechanized rifle company and the Swedish supply company. In June 2011, Camp Victoria was to be completely discontinued and KS21 was the last Swedish contingent that was operational at the camp before KS22 moved into the KFOR headquarters at Camp Film City.
