= Sailing at the 2023 Pan American Games =

- Sailing pictogram
- Venue: Cofradia Nautica del Pacifico
- Start date: October 28, 2023
- End date: November 5, 2023
- No. of events: 13 (5 men, 5 women, 3 mixed)
- Competitors: 171 from 27 nations

Sailing competitions at the 2023 Pan American Games in Santiago, Chile are schedule to take place between October 28 and November 5, 2023 at the Cofradia Nautica del Pacifico (Nautical Brotherhood of the Pacific in English) in the city of Algarrobo.

A total of 13 events will be contested, an increase of two from the 2019 Pan American Games. The sunfish event has been split in two, to have an event each for men and women. Also, the kites event was split in two, with the men and women now competing in separate events. The RS:X boat has also been replaced with the IQFoil.

A total of 172 sailors (82 men and 90 women) are scheduled to compete.

The top two placing athletes (not already qualified) from North America and South America in the men's laser and women's laser radial, qualified for the sailing competitions at the 2024 Summer Olympics in Paris, France (with the sailing competitions scheduled to be held in Marseille, along with the top boat in each region in the windsurfing, kites, 49er, 49erfx and Nacra 17 events will also qualify.

== Qualification ==
A total of 172 sailors (82 men and 90 women) will qualify to compete at the games. A nation may enter a maximum of one boat in each of the 13 events and a maximum of 19 athletes (nine men and ten women). Each event had different qualifying events that began in 2021. The host nation (Chile) automatically qualified in all 13 events (19 athletes). More women will qualify to compete for the first time ever, after the lightning class switched to a two women and one man format for each boat. The winner of each sailing event at the 2021 Junior Pan American Games, directly qualified as well. Countries earning a spot at the 2021 Junior Pan American Games, can earn another boat in that respective event. The slot awarded at the games is to the athlete, and cannot be transferred to another athlete. A total of four universality quotas were available (two each in the laser and laser radial events).

== Medal summary ==
=== Medal table ===
* Host nation (Chile)

Rank	noc	Gold	Silver	Bronze	Total
1	United States	4	3	2	9
2	Brazil	3	0	3	6
3	Argentina	2	1	2	5
4	Peru	2	1	0	3
5	Canada	1	2	1	4
6	Mexico	1	0	1	2
7	Chile*	0	2	2	4
8	Aruba	0	2	0	2
9	Antigua and Barbuda	0	1	0	1
9	Uruguay	0	1	0	1
11	Dominican Republic	0	0	1	1
11	Independent Athletes Team	0	0	1	1
Totals (12 entries)		13	13	13	39

=== Medalists ===
==== Men's events ====
Event	Gold	Silver	Bronze
IQFoil	Mateus Isaac; Brazil	Ethan Westera; Aruba	Noah Lyons; United States
ILCA 7	Stefano Peschiera; Peru	Clemente Seguel; Chile	Juan Ignacio Maegli; Independent Athletes Team
49er	United States; Ian Barrows; Hans Henken	Uruguay; Hernán Umpierre; Fernando Diz	Canada; Will Jones; Justin Barnes
Sunfish	Lee Parkhill; Canada	Jean Paul de Trazegnies; Peru	Diego González; Chile
Kite	Bruno Lobo; Brazil	Tiger Tyson; Antigua and Barbuda	Deury Corniel; Dominican Republic

==== Women's events ====
Event	Gold	Silver	Bronze
IQFoil	Mariana Aguilar Chávez; Mexico	Dominique Stater; United States	Demita Vega; Mexico
ILCA 6	Erika Reineke; United States	Sarah Douglas; Canada	Luciana Cardozo; Argentina
49erFX	Brazil; Martine Grael; Kahena Kunze	Canada; Alexandra Ten Hove; Mariah Millen	United States; Stephanie Roble; Maggie Shea
Sunfish	Caterina Romero; Peru	Philipine van Aanholt; Aruba	María José Poncell; Chile
Kite	Daniela Moroz; United States	Catalina Turienzo; Argentina	Maria do Socorro Reis; Brazil

==== Mixed events ====
Event	Gold	Silver	Bronze
Snipe	Argentina; Julio Alsogaray; Marlena Sciarra	United States; Ernesto Rodríguez; Kathleen Tocke	Brazil; Rafael Martins; Juliana Duque
Lightning	United States; Allan Terhune Jr. Madeline Baldridge; Sarah Chin	Chile; Pedro Bertossi; Paula Herman; Carmina Malsch	Argentina; Javier Conte; Martina Silva; Trinidad Silva
Nacra 17	Argentina; Mateo Majdalani; Eugenia Bosco	United States; David Liebenberg; Sarah Newberry Moore	Brazil; Samuel Albrecht; Gabriela Nicolino

== 2024 Summer Olympics Qualification ==
This event was a direct qualification event for the 2024 Summer Olympics. A total of 28 quota places (14 for men and 14 for women) were awarded.

Event	Qualification path	Quotas	NOCs
Men's IQFoil	Two NOCs of the highest placed North and South American country, will each earn one quota place.	2 (1 per NOC)	Aruba; Argentina
Men's Laser	Four NOCs of the two highest placed North and South American countries, will each earn one quota place.	4 (1 per NOC)	Aruba; Puerto Rico; Chile; Guatemala
Men's 49er	Two NOCs of the highest placed North and South American country, will each earn two quota places (one boat).	4 (2 per NOC)	Canada; Uruguay
Men's Kitesurfing	Two NOCs of the highest placed North and South American country, will each earn one quota place.	2 (1 per NOC)	Antigua and Barbuda; Colombia
Women's IQFoil	Two NOCs of the highest placed North and South American country, will each earn one quota place.	2 (1 per NOC)	United States; Argentina
Women's Laser radial	Four NOCs of the two highest placed North and South American countries, will each earn one quota place.	4 (1 per NOC)	Bermuda; Mexico; Peru; Uruguay
Women's 49erFX	Two NOCs of the highest placed North and South American country, will each earn two quota places (one boat).	4 (2 per NOC)	Canada; Brazil
Women's Kitesurfing	Two NOCs of the highest placed North and South American country, will each earn one quota place.	2 (1 per NOC)	Canada; Argentina
Mixed Nacra 17	Two NOCs of the highest placed North and South American country, will each earn two quota places, one per gender (one boat).	4 (2 per NOC)	United States; Brazil
Total quota places awarded		28	

=== Summary ===
Nation	Men				Women				Mixed	Total	
Nation	IQFoil	Laser	49er	Kites	IQFoil	Laser Radial	49erFX	Kites	Nacra 17	Boats	Athletes
Antigua and Barbuda				X						1	1
Argentina	X				X			X		3	3
Aruba	X	X								2	2
Bermuda						X				1	1
Brazil							X		X	2	4
Canada			X				X	X		3	5
Chile		X								1	1
Colombia				X						1	1
Guatemala		X								1	1
Mexico						X				1	1
Peru						X				1	1
Puerto Rico		X								1	1
United States					X				X	2	3
Uruguay			X			X				2	3
Total: 14 NOCs	2	4	2	2	2	4	2	2	2	22	28

== See also ==
- Sailing at the 2024 Summer Olympics
