= Sarah Douglas (sailor) =

Canadian competitive sailor

Personal information
- Nationality: Canadian
- Born: 21 January 1994 (age 32) Burlington, Ontario, Canada
- Height: 1.82 m (6 ft 0 in)
- Weight: 68 kg (150 lb)

Sailing career
- Sport: Sailing
- College team: University of Guelph
- Club: Ashbridge's Bay Yacht Club
Medal record
Pan American Games
Gold medal – first place	2019 Lima	Women's laser radial
Silver medal – second place	2023 Santiago	Women's laser radial

Sarah Douglas (born 21 January 1994 in Burlington) is a Canadian competitive sailor. She won gold in the Laser Radial at the 2019 Pan American Games in Lima, Peru, and took silver in the 2023 competition in Santiago, Chile.

She finished 6th at the 2018 Sailing World Championships. She competed at the 2020 Summer Olympics in Japan, finishing 6th in the Laser Radial class.

== Life ==
She was born in Burlington, Ontario. She started sailing at the age of 7 in Barbados and competed at her first world championship at age 10 in the optimist class. She was Optimist Canadian national champion.

Her older brother Greg is a two-time Olympian in sailing who represented Barbados at Beijing 2008 and Canada at London 2012.

Douglas went to school at the University of Guelph for her Bachelor of Commerce; as of 2019, she lists Toronto as her hometown.
