= Anna Weis =

American sailor (born 1998)

Personal information
- Born: March 24, 1998 (age 28) Fort Lauderdale, Florida, U.S.
- Height: 5 ft 9 in (175 cm)

Sailing career
- Sport: Sailing
Medal record
Sailing
Representing United States
Pan American Games
Gold medal – first place	2019 Lima	Nacra 17

Anna Weis (born March 24, 1998) is an American sailor. She qualified to represent Team USA at the 2020 Summer Olympics in Tokyo, competing with Riley Gibbs in the Nacra 17 (Mixed Two-Person Multihull) event.

== Career highlights ==
- 7th, Laser Radial, Laser Radial Youth Worlds (Kingston, CAN), 2015
- 8th, Laser Radial, Laser Radial Youth Worlds (Dun Laoghaire, IRE), 2016
- 1st, Laser Radial, US Women's Singlehanded National Championship (Mentor-on-the-Lake, OH, USA), 2016
- 8th, Laser Radial, US Singlehanded National Championship (Mentor-on-the-Lake, OH, USA), 2016
- Women's Singlehanded National Champion (2016)
- 11th, Nacra 17, SWC Series Round 1 – Miami (Miami, USA), 2017
- 1st, Pan American Games Lima 2019 (Paracas, PER), 2019
- 12th, Nacra 17, Trofeo S.A.R. Princesa Sofia (Palma de Mallorca, ESP), 2019
- 15th, Nacra 17, Hempel World Cup Series – Round 2, Miami (Miami, USA), 2019
