= Crown Princess Victoria's Fund =

Swedish fund

The Crown Princess Victoria's Fund (Swedish: Kronprinsessan Victorias fond) is working for helping disabled Swedish children. Its founder is the Crown Princess Victoria of Sweden. The foundation is co-operating with Radiohjälpen.
