= Mateo Majdalani =

Argentine sailor (born 1994)

Personal information
- Born: 15 July 1994 (age 31) Buenos Aires, Argentina

Sailing career
- Sport: Sailing
- Class: Nacra 17
Medal record
Sailing
Representing Argentina
Olympic Games
Silver medal – second place	2024 Paris	Nacra 17
Pan American Games
Gold medal – first place	2023 Santiago	Nacra 17
Silver medal – second place	2019 Lima	Nacra 17

Mateo Majdalani (born 15 July 1994) is an Argentine sailor who specializes in the Nacra 17 category. He is a silver medalist at the 2024 Summer Olympics, gold medalist at the 2023 Pan American Games and silver medalist at the 2019 Pan American Games.

== Youth Sailing World Championships ==
In 2012, at the Youth Sailing World Championships held in the Irish town of Dún Laoghaire, organized by ISAF, Majdalani won the bronze medal in the 29er class, partnering with Klaus Lange.

== 2019 and 2023 Pan American Games ==
Majdalani won the gold medal at the 2023 Pan American Games and silver medal at the 2019 Pan American Games, both together with compatriot Eugenia Bosco.

== 2024 Summer Olympics ==
On 8 August 2024, Majdalani (30 years old) and Bosco (27 years old) won the silver medal, sailing a Nacra 17 in the mixed multihull event, one of the few Olympic sporting events in which men and women compete together.

19 boats from the same number of countries competed in the event. Majdalani and Bosco came in eighth in the World Sailing ranking, with the best precedent of having finished fourth in the Nacra 17 World Championship held in May 2024. The favorite pairs for gold were the Italian (Tita-Banti) and the British (Gimson-Burnet), world champion and first in the world ranking respectively.

The competition was designed to take place in three days, through twelve general races and a final race (medal race) to which the ten boats with the best scores qualify. The points per race are equal to the position in which each boat arrives, discarding the worst position, with double points in the medal race.

The first series of four races was held on 3 August and the Argentine team surprised in the initial race by finishing in 2nd position, behind the favorite Italian duo, a result that was repeated in the second race. In the third and fourth races, the Argentine boat arrived in 5th and 10th position, but maintained the second position with 9 points overall, behind Italy, which was already dominant with three first places and one second, and closely followed by New Zealand (10) and Finland (11). Behind them were Great Britain (13), France (17), Germany (18), Spain (18), the Netherlands (20), Sweden (31), Brazil (32), China (33), Australia (35), the United States (40), Austria (41), Belgium (46), Turkey (49) and Japan (51).

On the second day, Majdalani and Bosco finished 6th in the fifth and sixth races, 3rd in the fifth and 2nd in the sixth race, maintaining consistency but finishing third in the overall standings with 26 points, being overtaken by New Zealand (21), while Italy (8) extended its lead with three new victories. Behind them were Great Britain (34), France (37), Finland (41), Germany (44), the Netherlands (49), Spain (59) and Brazil (67) in tenth place, with the rest of the boats far behind in the general classification.

On the third day, the last four general races were run, but due to lack of wind, the medal race could not be run, which was postponed to the following day. Argentina had an outstanding performance in the ninth, tenth and eleventh races, with a first place and two second places, significantly reducing the distance with the Italian pair, opening the possibility of competing for the gold medal in the following two last races. But a twelfth place in race twelve again distanced Argentina, leaving it with 41 points, far behind Italy (27 points), but with New Zealand and Great Britain hot on its heels with 47 points. The rest of the field had no chance of a medal.

To face the medal race (with double points), Italy had to avoid falling behind sixth place to secure gold, while Argentina had to ensure that neither New Zealand nor Great Britain overtook it by more than two positions. The start was dramatic because Argentina and Great Britain started early. In this situation, the British would be disqualified, losing all chance of competing for a medal, while the Argentines avoided disqualification by immediately making the decision to go back and start again, but finishing in second-to-last place, while New Zealand started in first place 24 seconds ahead. But already in the first of the four legs (sections) the Argentines had managed to overtake the New Zealanders and from then on they controlled the relative position, to finish in 7th position, ahead of their immediate competitors for the silver medal.
