= The Observatory (album) =

2002 studio album by Cadet

Studio album by Cadet
- Released: October 8, 2002
- Genres: Christian alternative rock, garage rock, rockabilly
- Length: 51:52
- Label: BEC
- Producer: Christopher Stevens

Cadet chronology
Cadet (2001)	The Observatory (2002)

The Observatory is the second and final studio album by Cadet, released the album on October 8, 2002 through BEC Recordings. Cadet worked with producer Christopher Stevens in the production of this album.

== Critical reception ==
Professional ratings
Review scores
Source	Rating
AllMusic	4/5 stars
Christianity Today	4/5 stars
Cross Rhythms	9/10 squares
Jesus Freak Hideout	4/5 stars
The Phantom Tollbooth	4.5/5; 4.5/5; 4/5

Awarding the album four stars from AllMusic, David McCreary states, "Intense and enduringly tuneful, The Observatory is a superlative representation of Cadet's artistic maturity and first-rate talent." Tony Cummings, rating the album a nine out of ten at Cross Rhythms, writes, "Classy pop rock with exceedingly tuneful hooks." Giving the album four stars for Christianity Today, Russ Breimeier opines, "Listen to Cadet's The Observatory with fresh ears and an open mind – you'll be pleasantly surprised." Dave Urbanski, reviewing the album from CCM Magazine, describes, "This quartet makes an incredible leap forward here, leaving its debut's too-derivative pop in the dust. With The Observatory, Cadet heaps on thick slabs of hard rock, and the result is righteous. These 11 varying yet cohesive tunes feature excellent harmonies, thoughtful lyrics, inventive instrumentation and a dual guitar interplay that smartly echoes Matthew Sweet’s best work."

Josh McConnel, giving the album 4.5 out of five for The Phantom Tollbooth, writes, "The Observatory is a great album...if you haven’t heard Cadet’s debut album, and enjoy rock/light-rock music, definitely check the album out if you can. It’s a good one." Rating the album 4.5 out of five at The Phantom Tollbooth, Jessica Heikoop states, "This has certainly been an attractive quality to this album. This album has been spinning in my player over and over. And it just continues to grow on me more and more." Bert Gangl, signaling in a 4.0 out of five review for The Phantom Tollbooth, describes, "Although true pop aficionados will no doubt fumble for adequate superlatives to describe the new release, suffice it to say that the new album carries a weight, coherence and attention to detail that were, quite simply, lacking from far too much of the debut - not to mention a rightful reverence for hook and melody that is only just recently making its way back into the collective rock consciousness." Awarding the album four stars at Jesus Freak Hideout, John DiBiase says, "Cadet has made impressive progress in the past year, with The Observatory marking a smart step in the right direction in the evolution of this young band."

== Track listing ==
All tracks are written by Cadet and Ryan Smith.

The Observatory
No.	Title	Length
1.	"Nobody"	3:59
2.	"Blame"	4:00
3.	"Change My Name"	4:27
4.	"Call Me"	3:27
5.	"Today"	4:28
6.	"High Tide"	3:28
7.	"Stuck in a Song"	2:51
8.	"Two Stars"	4:25
9.	"Cry to You"	2:49
10.	"Come Alive"	5:26
11.	"Wishing Well"	12:32
Total length:		51:52
