= Cadette =

Cadette may refer to:

- Ignatius Cadette (born 1957), a West Indian cricketer
- Richard Cadette (born 1965), an English footballer
- Cadette, Haiti, a village in the Chambellan commune
- Cadette, a place in Martinique
- Cadette, a membership level of the Girl Scouts of the USA
- Cadette (film), a 1913 film by Léon Poirier

== See also ==
- Cadet (disambiguation)
