= Sailing at the 2015 Pan American Games – 49er FX =

Women's 49erFX at the 2015 Pan American Games
- Venue: Royal Canadian Yacht Club
- Dates: July 12 - July 18
- Competitors: 12 from 6 nations

Medalists
Gold medal	Victoria Travascio; María Branz	Argentina
Silver medal	Martine Grael; Kahena Kunze	Brazil
Bronze medal	Paris Henken; Helena Scutt	United States

The women's 49erFX competition of the sailing events at the 2015 Pan American Games in Toronto was held from July 12 to July 18 at the Royal Canadian Yacht Club.

Points were assigned based on the finishing position in each race (1 for first, 2 for second, etc.). The points were totaled from the top 15 results of the first 16 races, with lower totals being better. If a team was disqualified or did not complete the race, 7 points were assigned for that race (as there were 6 teams in this competition). The top 5 teams at that point competed in the final race, with placings counting double for final score. The team with the lowest total score won.

== Schedule ==
All times are Eastern Daylight Time (UTC-4).

Date	Time	Round
July 12, 2015	11:35	Race 1
July 13, 2015	11:35	Races 2, 3 and 4
July 14, 2015	11:35	Races 5 and 6
July 15, 2015	11:35	Races 7 and 8
July 16, 2015	11:35	Races 9, 10, 11 and 12
July 17, 2015	11:35	Races 13, 14, 15 and 16
July 18, 2015	16:35	Medal race

== Results ==
Race M is the medal race.

Rank	Athlete	Nation	Race																	Total Points	Net Points
Rank	Athlete	Nation	1	2	3	4	5	6	7	8	9	10	11	12	13	14	15	16	M	Total Points	Net Points
1st place, gold medalist(s)	Victoria Travascio; Maria Branz	Argentina	1	1	2	4	2	1	1	2	2	1	3	3	1	1	3	(5)	8	41	36
2nd place, silver medalist(s)	Martine Soffiatti Grael; Kahena Kunze	Brazil	4	(7); OCS	1	1	4	2	7 OCS	1	1	5	2	1	4	2	1	3	4	50	43
3rd place, bronze medalist(s)	Paris Henken; Helena Scutt	United States	2	3	3	3	3	4	2	(5)	5	3	1	2	2	5	2	1	6	52	47
4	Mayumi Roller; Kayla McComb	Virgin Islands	5	2	4	(6)	1	3	3	3	4	4	5	6	3	3	5	2	10	69	63
5	Begoña Gumucio; Arantza Gumucio	Chile	3	4	(6)	2	5	5	4	4	6	2	6	4	5	4	6	6	2	74	68
6	Erin Rafuse; Danielle Boyd	Canada	6	(7); OCS	5	5	6	6	5	6	3	6	4	5	6	4	4	4	—	84	77
