= Mariah Millen =

Canadian sailor

Personal information
- Full name: Mariah Alice Jane Millen
- Born: June 29, 1998 (age 28) Toronto, Ontario, Canada
- Height: 176 cm (5 ft 9 in)
- Weight: 70 kg (154 lb)

Sailing career
- Country: Canada
- Sport: Sailing
- Club: Royal Canadian Yacht Club
- Class: 49er FX
Medal record
Sailing
Representing Canada
Pan American Games
Silver medal – second place	2023 Santiago	49er FX
North American Championships
Silver medal – second place	2016 Newport	49er FX

Mariah Alice Jane Millen (born June 29, 1998) is a Canadian sailor in the 49er FX class with partner Alexandra Ten Hove.

== Career ==
In 2019, Millen and Alexandra Ten Hove competed at the 2019 Pan American Games, finishing in fourth place, and qualified Canada an entry for the event at the 2020 Summer Olympics in Tokyo.

In February 2020, the pair finished in 18th place at the World Championships, their highest placement in the event.

In March 2021, Millen was named to Canada's 2020 Olympic team with her partner Alexandra Ten Hove.

Millen was part of the Canadian Team in the 2024 Barcelona Women's 37th America's Cup.
