= Riley Gibbs =

American sailor

Personal information
- Nationality: American
- Born: November 3, 1996 (age 29) Long Beach, California, U.S.
- Height: 6 ft 0 in (183 cm)

Sailing career
- Sport: Sailing
Medal record
Sailing
Representing United States
Pan American Games
Gold medal – first place	2019 Lima	Nacra 17

Riley Gibbs (born November 3, 1996) is an American sailor. He qualified to represent Team USA in the 2020 Tokyo Summer Olympics, competing with Anna Weis in the Nacra 17 (Mixed Two-Person Multihull) event.

== Career highlights ==
- 1st, Sabot, Junior Sabot Nationals, 2010
- 2nd, 29er, ISAF Youth Sailing World Championships, 2014
- 1st, 505, North American Championship, 2016
- 1st, Nacra 17, Oakcliff Sailing Triple Crown #3 (Oyster Bay, NY), 2017
- 4th, IKA-Formula Kite, Formula Kite World Championships (Muscat, OMA), 2017
- 4th, Nacra 17, 2018 World Cup Series Final – Marseille (Marseille, FRA), 2018
- 1st, Nacra 17, Pan American Games Lima 2019 (Paracas, PER), 2019
