= Cadet (band) =

American Christian alternative rock band

- Origin: Eugene, Oregon
- Genres: Christian alternative rock, garage rock, rockabilly
- Years active: 2000–2004
- Labels: BEC
- Members: Ryan Smith; Matt Lenhart
- Past members: Jason Kennedy; Chad Basom

Cadet was an American Christian alternative rock band from Eugene, Oregon, and they formed in 2000 and disbanded in 2004. They released, Cadet, with BEC Recordings, in 2001. The same label released, The Observatory, in 2002.

== Members ==
Members

- Ryan Smith – lead vocals, lead guitar
- Matt Lenhart – guitar, keys, background vocals
- Jason Kennedy – bass, background vocals
- Chad Basom – drums, background vocals

== Discography ==
Studio albums

- Cadet (April 24, 2001, BEC)
- The Observatory (October 8, 2002, BEC)
