= Alexandra ten Hove =

Canadian sailor

Personal information
- Full name: Alexandra Grace ten Hove
- Nickname: Ali
- Born: December 23, 1995 (age 30) Kingston, Ontario, Canada
- Height: 167 cm (5 ft 6 in)
- Weight: 60 kg (132 lb)

Sailing career
- Country: Canada
- Sport: Sailing
- Class: 49er FX
Medal record
Sailing
Representing Canada
Pan American Games
Silver medal – second place	2023 Santiago	49er FX

Alexandra Grace "Ali" ten Hove (born December 23, 1995) is a Canadian sailor in the 49er FX class with partner Mariah Millen.

== Career ==
In 2019, ten Hove and Mariah Millen competed at the 2019 Pan American Games, finishing in fourth place, and qualified Canada an entry for the event at the 2020 Summer Olympics in Tokyo.

In February 2020, the pair finished in 18th place at the World Championships, their highest placement in the event.

In March 2021, ten Hove was named to Canada's 2020 Olympic team with her partner Mariah Millen.
