= Jean Lud Cadet =

Haitian-American psychiatrist

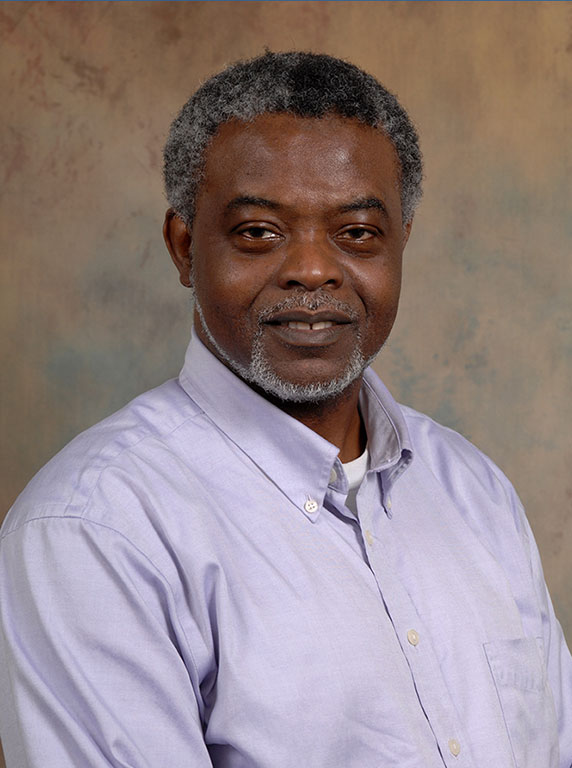
- Cadet's official National Institute on Drug Abuse photo, 2017
- Born: Haiti
- Education: Columbia University; Collège Notre-Dame
- Scientific career
- Workplaces: National Institute on Drug Abuse; National Institutes of Health; Mount Sinai Health System; Columbia University

Jean Lud Cadet is a Haitian-American psychiatrist at the National Institute on Drug Abuse (NIDA), where he serves as National Institutes of Health Chief of the Molecular Neuropsychiatry Research Branch. His research considers the genetic, epigenetic and cellular bases of substance abuse. In 2020 he was selected as one of Cell Press' Most Inspiring Black Scientists in America.

== Early life and education ==
Cadet is from Haiti. He attended the Collège Notre-Dame for high school. After graduating high school, Cadet moved to New York City in 1970, where he joined Columbia University to complete a degree in medicine. He was a psychiatry resident at both Columbia University and in the Mount Sinai Health System.

== Research and career ==
In 1992 Cadet moved to the National Institute on Drug Abuse (NIDA), where he serves as National Institutes of Health Chief of the Molecular Neuropsychiatry Research Branch. His early research considered the effects of drugs on human memory. He has shown that the molecular networks within the brain are impacted by the acute administration of addictive substances. In particular, Cadet has considered the cellular mechanisms that underpin addiction of psychostimulants. Cadet has looked at the influence of addictive substances on the expression of immediate early gene (IEGs), and shown that IEGs can be induced within minutes of activation.

He has studied self-administration of methamphetamine, and shown that in striatal dopaminergic systems it is accompanied with markers of toxicity. This indicates that dopamine activates neurodegenerative processes within the brain, via the upregulation of neurotrophic factors and downregulation of glutamatergic systems.

== Select publications ==
- Bolla, K. I.; Brown, K.; Eldreth, D.; Tate, K.; Cadet, J. L. (2002-11-12). "Dose-related neurocognitive effects of marijuana use". Neurology. 59 (9): 1337–1343. doi:10.1212/01.WNL.0000031422.66442.49. ISSN 0028-3878. PMID 12427880. S2CID 11525660.
- Bolla, K. I; Eldreth, D. A; London, E. D; Kiehl, K. A; Mouratidis, M; Contoreggi, C; Matochik, J. A; Kurian, V; Cadet, J. L; Kimes, A. S; Funderburk, F. R (2003-07-01). "Orbitofrontal cortex dysfunction in abstinent cocaine abusers performing a decision-making task". NeuroImage. 19 (3): 1085–1094. doi:10.1016/S1053-8119(03)00113-7. ISSN 1053-8119. PMC 2767245. PMID 12880834.
- Cadet, Jean Lud; Brannock, Christie (1998-02-01). "Invited Review Free radicals and the pathobiology of brain dopamine systems". Neurochemistry International. 32 (2): 117–131. doi:10.1016/S0197-0186(97)00031-4. ISSN 0197-0186. PMID 9542724. S2CID 24866888.
