= Ashbridge's Bay Yacht Club =

Yacht Club in Toronto, Canada

Coordinates: 43°39′29″N 79°18′40″W

- Burgee
- Short name: ABYC
- Founded: 1932
- Location: Toronto, Ontario, Canada
- Commodore: Gerald Hamers
- Website: www.abyc.ca

Ashbridge's Bay Yacht Club (ABYC) is a yacht club in Ashbridge's Bay, Toronto, Ontario, Canada. The club offers a junior and adult sailing school, dinghy and keelboat racing programs, a cooperative sailing program, cruising and social events. In 2025, there are 702 Members, Associates, and Juniors and docks for up to 292 keelboats. Club facilities include a restaurant and a public fuel dock with pumpout, diesel and gasoline.

== History ==
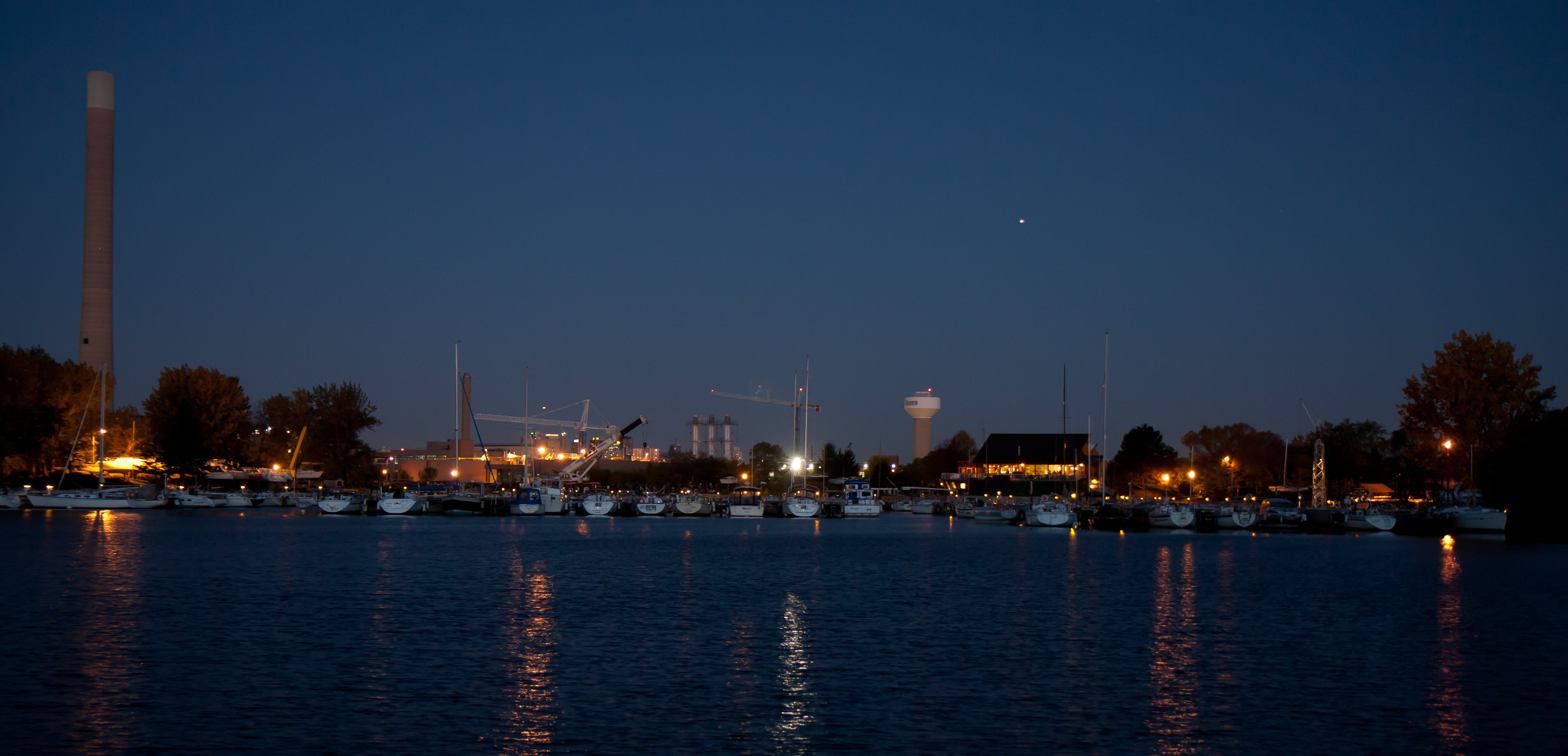
Ashbridge's Bay Yacht Club at dawn (October 2010)

The club was founded in 1932 and was initially located at Knox and Eastern Avenues. Archie Walker was the club's first commodore. The original clubhouse was built in 1936 by its members. ABYC was chartered as a not-for-profit in 1946 as an organization "to advance the sport of yachting in all its branches". The club began to move locations in 1971 to new land accessible by Lakeshore Avenue. From 1975-1977, the current clubhouse was built, which includes a bar and restaurant.

ABYC has a long history on the Toronto waterfront, in 1957 membership grew to 100, and in 1963 it was called home to one of the area's largest fleets.

The club saw a significant growth in membership during the COVID-19 pandemic, during which time it undertook significant dock upgrades. In 2022, the club celebrated its 90th anniversary.

ABYC has programs specifically to support girls and women in the sport of sailing.

== Yacht and Dinghy Racing ==
Ashbridge's Bay Yacht Club has a long history of competitive sailing. Members race in course and coastal races several days a week.

ABYC regularly hosts numerous regattas and has hosted well known events such as the Lake Yacht Racing Association, LYRA Regatta.

ABYC hosted the Sail Canada 2024 and 2026 Sail Central Championships.

In 2026, ABYC will host the Beneteau First 36.7 North American Championship.

ABYC members include national and international judges.

ABYC and has been home to Olympian sailors, including Nigel Cochrane, and Laser Radial sailor Sarah Douglas, who trains at and calls ABYC her home club. She finished 6th in the 2020 Olympics and was the gold medallist at the 2019 Pan Am Games.

Professional skipper and sailing instructor Diane Reid, the first Canadian woman to challenge the Mini Transat Race is based out of ABYC.
