= The Cadets =

The Cadets can refer to one of the following:

- The Cadets Drum and Bugle Corps
- The Cadets (group), an American doo-wop group
- The Cadets (TV series) - 10-part Russian TV series dealing with the Battle of Stalingrad
