= Victoria Travascio =

Argentine sailor

Personal information
- Nickname: Vicky
- Born: 14 July 1988 (age 37) La Plata, Argentina
- Height: 161 cm (5 ft 3 in)
- Weight: 59 kg (130 lb)

Sailing career
- Sport: Sailing
- Club: Yacht Club Argentino
- Class(es): 49erFX, Nacra 17, Cadet, 29er, 49er
Medal record
Women's sailing
Representing Argentina
Pan American Games
Gold medal – first place	2015 Toronto	49erFX
Bronze medal – third place	2019 Lima	49erFX

Victoria "Vicky" Travascio (born 14 July 1988) is an Argentine sailor. She and María Sol Branz won a gold medal in the women's 49erFX event at the 2015 Pan American Games, and bronze in the 2019 edition.

The two also competed in two Olympic Games, finishing 13th in the 49erFX event at the 2016 Summer Olympics, and fifth in the 2020 Summer Olympics.
