= Danielle Boyd =

Canadian sailor

Danielle (Dannie) Boyd (born May 30, 1990, in Kingston, Ontario) is a Canadian sailor. Along with partner Erin Rafuse, Boyd finished in sixth place at the 2015 Pan American Games in the 49erFX. Rafuse and Boyd also qualified to compete at the 2016 Summer Olympics, finishing 16th. Boyd currently coaches the Queen's University Sailing Team, which are 3 time national Team Racing champions from 2022, 2023, and 2024.
