= Gabriela Nicolino =

Brazilian sailor (born 1989)

Personal information
- Full name: Gabriela Nicolino de Sá
- Nickname: Gabi
- Born: 25 August 1989 (age 36) Rio de Janeiro, Rio de Janeiro, Brazil
- Height: 163 cm (5 ft 4 in)
- Weight: 64 kg (141 lb)

Sailing career
- Sport: Sailing
- Class(es): Nacra 17, 49erFX, Elliott 6m, Sonar
Medal record
Sailing
Representing Brazil
Pan American Games
Bronze medal – third place	2019 Lima	Nacra 17
Bronze medal – third place	2023 Santiago	Nacra 17

Gabriela "Gabi" Nicolino de Sá (born 25 August 1989) is a Brazilian sailor. She competed in the Nacra 17 event at the 2020 Summer Olympics.
