= International Cadet Australian Championship =

Sailing competition

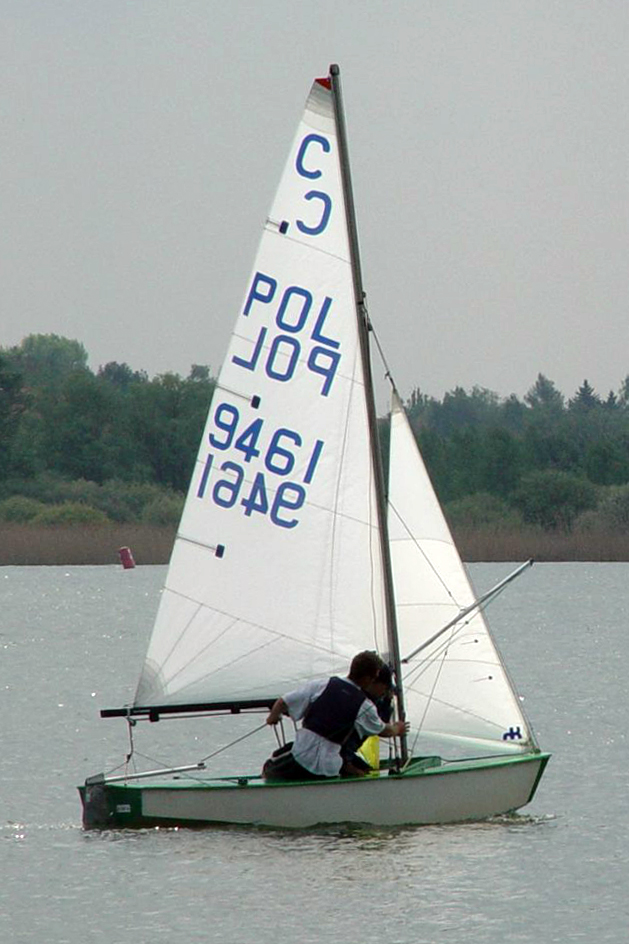
A Cadet class sailing dinghy, of the type to be raced in the championship

The International Cadet Australian Championship is an annual series of championship races held in Australia as the top racing event for the Cadet class sailing dinghy in the country. Generally held as a qualifier for the world cup, the championship will reach its 50th event in 2011 when it will be held at Lake Macquarie in New South Wales from 27 December 2011 to 4 January 2012.

Over the course of the competition there are two major awards that competitors race for. The first is for an individual boat winning the overall national championship. This is worked out by adding the score for their ten best races in comparison to other competitors. The other is the Tillet Team Trophy. This is a state competition where by the best six boats from each state get their scores in races added up in comparison to other boats in the Tillet team, with two drops, and the state with the lowest number of points win.

== Recent years ==
Each year the Cadet National Championships is rotated in location around Australia. Recent venues have included Geelong, Sydney, Hobart, Port Lincoln, Adelaide and Melbourne.

Tasmania hosted the 1997 championship in the River Derwent, with a local sailor taking out the overall prize, and in 1998 the championship was held at Corio Bay in Geelong as a lead-in to the world championships at the same venue. Adelaide, South Australia was the venue for 2000, and Adelaide also hosted the 2003 races, which saw representatives of the Adelaide Sailing Club achieve the first win by South Australians in 30 years. The Adelaide Sailing club also hosted the 2004 championship, but the event moved the following year: the 2005 championship was held in New South Wales for the first time, sailing out of the Woollahra Sailing Club. Tasmanians took out the overall championship that year, with Lucy Shephard and Sophie Chesterman winning the competition, but the Tillet Team Trophy went to Victoria.

In 2006 the 45th championship returned to the River Derwent, Tasmania, and was hosted by the Sandy Bay Sailing Club in a championship that coincided with the completion of that year's Sydney to Hobart Yacht Race. Although the 2006 championship had 86 boats in the fleet, this figure was surpassed the following year when 92 boats entered the competition. Hosted by the Royal Geelong Yacht Club, the overall winners were Tasmanians Douglas Shephard and Josh Brown.

The 47th International Cadet Australian Championship was held in Port Lincoln, South Australia from 11 to 18 January 2009, with Tasmania winning the Tillet Team Trophy and a Tasmanian boat skippered by Lewis Noye emerging as the overall winner. The championship returned to South Australia in 2010, although this time to Adelaide rather than Port Lincoln, and was subsequently won by Tasmanian sailors Alec and Samantha Bailey. They went on to finish third at the world championships in Poland, (with Australians Anton and Julian Sasson finishing second) and Alec Bailey was subsequently named male sailor of the year in the 2010 Yachting Tasmania Achievement Awards. Tasmania also had a strong showing in the 2010/2011 championships in Melbourne, with entrants from the Sandy Bay Sailing Club winning three out of the top seven places, although first place went to Sean Keen and Oscar Mitton from the Adelaide Sailing Club.

== 50th Redlands International Cadet Australian Championship ==
The 50th Redlands International Cadet Australian Championship is to be held from 27 December 2011 to 4 January 2012 in Lake Macquarie, NSW, Australia. It is the top racing event for the Cadet Class sailing dinghy in Australia. This year, as scheduling has changed from previous years, the event will not be a qualifier into the world championships. As the Cadet Class is an under-18 class the event will be a truly youth affair. This year there are predicted to be 60-70 boats in the event.

=== Championship table ===
| # | Boat | Skipper | Crew | R1 | R2 | R3 | R4 | R5 | R6 | R7 | R8 | R9 | R10 | R11 | D1 | D2 | Total |
|---|---|---|---|---|---|---|---|---|---|---|---|---|---|---|---|---|---|
| 1 | (Tasmania) Impulse | Samantha Bailey | Hannah Chadwick | 10 | 3 | 3 | 2 | 4 | 7 | 4 | 1 | 61B | 1 | 2 | 61B | 10 | 27 |
| 2 | (Tasmania) Sirocco | Charlie Connor | Ethan Galbraith | 7 | 2 | 1 | 1 | 3 | 3 | 3 | 13 | 6 | 2 | 14 | 14 | 13 | 28 |
| 3 | (Tasmania) Meltemi | Oliver Burnell | Wizzy Dizzy Declerck | 9 | 6 | 4 | 5 | 2 | 8 | 6 | 2 | 7 | 3 | 5 | 9 | 8 | 40 |
| 4 | (Victoria (state)) Unfinished Business | Alice Endersbee | Grace Endersbee | 11 | 1 | 6 | 3 | 6 | 1 | 10 | 3 | 25 | 17 | 1 | 17 | 25 | 42 |
| 5 | (Victoria (state)) Wildcard | Liam Robinson | Gabe Nolan | 2 | 4 | 12 | 26 | 1 | 6 | 2 | 8 | 5 | 15 | 9 | 26 | 15 | 49 |
| 6 | (Victoria (state)) Brothers in Arms | Darcy Baranowski | Dominic Randall | 1 | 8 | 18 | 16 | 17 | 15 | 1 | 16 | 4 | 6 | 37 | 37 | 18 | 84 |
| 7 | (Tasmania) Phoenix | Sam Tiedemann | Hugo Allison | 13 | 10 | 5 | 4 | 18 | 12 | 8 | 5 | 10 | 23 | 40.5G | 40.5G | 23 | 85 |
| 8 | (Victoria (state)) Vamoose | Charlie Rae | Zoe Rae | 14 | 33 | 10 | 29 | 20 | 5 | 7 | 6 | 11 | 5 | 7 | 33 | 29 | 85 |
| 9 | (Tasmania) Executioner | Silas Hamilton | Rupert Hamilton | 15 | 9 | 7 | 10 | 19 | 4 | 21 | 4 | 24 | 4 | 18 | 24 | 21 | 90 |
| 10 | (Tasmania) Shimmer | Sam Abel | William Cooper | 19 | 20 | 9 | 8 | 5 | 2 | 14 | 50 | 12 | 11 | 16 | 50 | 20 | 96 |
| 11 | (South Australia) Endless Summer | Amy Perin | Marni Lydeamore | 16 | 17 | 16 | 9 | 8 | 19 | 9 | 12 | 3 | 8 | 29 | 29 | 19 | 98 |
| 12 | (Victoria (state)) Tempest | Olivia Neilson | Joel Lay | 3 | 21 | 20 | 11 | 23 | 9 | 20 | 13 | 2 | 9 | 14 | 24 | 23 | 99 |

N.B. All scores are updated at the end of each days sailing. Scores are currently updated with 11 races sailed. R = Race, D = Drop. In the case of a draw the boat with the best score for an individual race wins.

== 52nd International Cadet Australian Championship ==
The 52nd International Cadet Australian Championship is to be held from 27 December 2013 to 4 January 2014 at the Royal Victorian Yacht Club . It is the top racing event for the Cadet Class sailing dinghy in Australia. As the Cadet Class is an under 18 aged class the event attracts some of the top young sailors in the country.

== 53rd International Cadet Australian Championships ==
The 53rd International Cadet Australian Championships were held at the Port Lincoln Yacht Club in South Australia.

=== Championship table ===
| # | Boat | Skipper | R1 | R2 | R3 | R4 | R5 | R6 | R7 | R8 | R9 | R10 | R11 | R12 | D1 | D2 | Total |
|---|---|---|---|---|---|---|---|---|---|---|---|---|---|---|---|---|---|
| 1 | (Victoria (state)) Samaran | Julian Sasson | 5 | 2 | 1 | 2 | 6 | 8 | 13 | 1 | 1 | 13 | 5 | 1 | 13 | 13 | 32 |
| 2 | (Tasmania) Phoenix | Sam Abel | 67B | 1 | 6 | 4 | 1 | 1 | 2 | 2 | 17 | 10 | 1 | 8 | 67B | 17 | 36 |
| 3 | (Victoria (state)) Resistance | Oliver Manton | 6 | 24 | 13 | 7 | 2 | 2 | 8 | 7 | 16 | 7 | 2 | 7 | 24 | 16 | 61 |
| 4 | (Tasmania) Little Devil | Angus Price | 11 | 6 | 4 | 5 | 67O | 5 | 6 | 12 | 11 | 1 | 10 | 3 | 67O | 12 | 62 |
| 5 | (South Australia) Uncut | Emily Patching | 9 | 10 | 3 | 1 | 7 | 6 | 7 | 14 | 4 | 9 | 11 | 9 | 14 | 11 | 65 |
| 6 | (Tasmania) SEA-YA | Jasmin Galbraith | 15 | 5 | 7 | 3 | 67O | 7 | 3 | 6 | 7 | 16 | 3 | 12 | 67O | 16 | 68 |
| 7 | (South Australia) Bob | Marty Hood | 2 | 13 | 8 | 12 | 8 | 12 | 10 | 8 | 67Q | 5 | 6 | 2 | 67Q | 13 | 73 |
| 8 | (Victoria (state)) Jonathan L | Louis Schofield | 4 | 3 | 20 | 16 | 3 | 4 | 12 | 4 | 2 | 18 | 18 | 21 | 21 | 20 | 84 |
| 9 | (Tasmania) Meltemi | Toby Burnell | 18 | 9 | 2 | 8 | 12 | 3 | 18 | 3 | 19 | 6 | 13 | 10 | 19 | 18 | 84 |
| 10 | (Victoria (state)) Brothers in Arms | Dominic Randall | 1 | 8 | 30 | 20 | 20 | 16 | 11 | 9 | 3 | 2 | 20 | 11 | 20 | 30 | 101 |

N.B. All scores are updated at the end of each days sailing. Scores are currently updated with 11 races sailed. R = Race, D = Drop. In the case of a draw the boat with the best score for an individual race wins.
