= Sailing at the 2019 Pan American Games =

- Sailing pictogram
- Venue: Yacht Club Peruano
- Dates: August 3–10, 2019
- Competitors: 168 from 26 nations

Sailing competitions at the 2019 Pan American Games in Lima, Peru took place between August 3 and 10, 2019 at the Yacht Club Peruano in the city of Paracas.

Ten medal events were contested. Two of the events were for men, three for women, two were open (any gender can compete) and three are mixed (entries are required to include both genders). Eight of the events were carried over from the 2015 Games, with the Nacra 17 and Formula Kite events replacing the Hobie 16 and J/24. A total of 148 athletes across 106 boats qualified to compete at the games. On January 17, 2019, it was announced that an 11th medal event would be contested, the 49er, for men. A total of 168 sailors and 116 boats were scheduled to compete.

The top placing athlete (not already qualified) from North America and South America in the men's laser and women's laser radial, qualified for the sailing competitions at the 2020 Summer Olympics in Tokyo, Japan, along with the top two boats in the 49er, 49erfx and Nacra 17 events will also qualify.

== Medal table ==
* Host nation (Peru)

Rank	Nation	Gold	Silver	Bronze	Total
1	Brazil	5	2	2	9
2	Argentina	2	3	2	7
2	United States	2	3	2	7
4	Canada	1	1	1	3
5	Guatemala	1	0	0	1
6	Uruguay	0	2	0	2
7	Peru*	0	0	2	2
8	Aruba	0	0	1	1
8	Chile	0	0	1	1
Totals (9 entries)		11	11	11	33

== Medalists ==
=== Men's events ===
Event	Gold	Silver	Bronze
RS:X	Bautista Saubidet Birkner; Argentina	Pedro Pascual; United States	Mack van den Eerenbeemt; Aruba
Laser	Juan Ignacio Maegli; Guatemala	Bruno Fontes; Brazil	Charlie Buckingham; United States
49er	Brazil; Marco Grael; Gabriel Borges	Argentina; Yago Lange; Klaus Lange	Canada; Alexander Heinzemann; Justin Barnes

=== Women's events ===
Event	Gold	Silver	Bronze
RS:X	Patrícia Freitas; Brazil	María Celia Tejerina; Argentina	María Belén Bazo; Peru
Laser Radial	Sarah Douglas; Canada	Charlotte Rose; United States	Lucía Falasca; Argentina
49erFX	Brazil; Martine Grael; Kahena Kunze	United States; Stephanie Roble; Maggie Shea	Argentina; Victoria Travascio; María Sol Branz

=== Open events ===
Event	Gold	Silver	Bronze
Sunfish	Matheus Dellagnelo; Brazil	Luke Ramsay; Canada	Renzo Sanguineti; Peru
Formula Kite	Bruno Lobo; Brazil	Nicolás Landauer; Uruguay	Will Cyr; United States

=== Mixed events ===
Event	Gold	Silver	Bronze
Snipe	United States; Ernesto Rodriguez; Hallie Schiffman	Uruguay; Ricardo Fabini; Florencia Parnizari	Brazil; Rafael Martins; Juliana Duque
Lightning	Argentina; Javier Conte; Paula Salerno; Ignacio Giammona	Brazil; Cláudio Biekarck; Isabel Ficker; Gunnar Ficker	Chile; Felipe Robles; Andrés Guevara; Paula Herman
Nacra 17	United States; Riley Gibbs; Anna Weis	Argentina; Mateo Majdalani; Eugenia Bosco	Brazil; Samuel Albrecht; Gabriela Nicolino

== Participating nations ==
A total of 26 countries qualified sailors, a record high. The number of athletes a nation entered is in parentheses beside the name of the country.

- Antigua and Barbuda (3)
- Argentina (17)
- Aruba (3)
- Barbados (1)
- Bermuda (3)
- Brazil (17)
- British Virgin Islands (1)
- Canada (14)
- Cayman Islands (1)
- Chile (12)
- Colombia (3)
- Cuba (7)
- Dominican Republic (2)
- Ecuador (8)
- El Salvador (1)
- Guatemala (7)
- Mexico (8)
- Paraguay (1)
- Peru (17)
- Puerto Rico (5)
- Saint Lucia (2)
- Trinidad and Tobago (2)
- United States (17)
- Uruguay (9)
- Venezuela (6)
- Virgin Islands (1)

== Qualification ==
A total of 168 sailors and 116 boats qualified to compete at the games. A nation may enter a maximum of one boat in each of the ten events and a maximum of 17 athletes. Each event had different qualifying events that began in 2017. The host nation (Peru) automatically qualified in all ten events (17 athletes).

== See also ==
- Sailing at the 2020 Summer Olympics
