= Gun-Britt Andersson =

Swedish economist and civil servant

Back Tyra Gun-Britt Ingegerd Andersson, born 13 September 1942 in Malung, is a Swedish economist and civil servant.

She studied economics, political science, geography and mathematics at Uppsala University, graduating in 1968 as Bachelor of Arts. From 1969 to 1970 she worked as an administrative officer at the Ministry of Finance, and 1970–75 at the Ministry for Foreign Affairs. 1975–80 she was the chef de cabinet at the Swedish Agency for Research Cooperation with Developing Countries (SAREC), 1980–82 deputy director and 1983–84 director for the humanitarian aid office at the Swedish embassy in Dar es salaam, Tanzania. 1984–87 she was the Chief human resources officer for Swedish International Development Cooperation Agency (SIDA), 1987–92 permanent under-secretary at the Ministry for Foreign Affairs, 1992–94 director for UNRWA in Jerusalem, 1994 Secretary of state at the Ministry of Health and Social Affairs and from 1996 Secretary of state at the Ministry for Foreign Affairs, responsible for migration and refugee policy. In 1999 humanitarian aid policy was added to her portfolio. In 2003 she was appointed Permanent Representative of Sweden to the OECD and UNESCO.

She's held office at Järfälla municipality from 1985 to 1990, representing the Swedish Social Democratic Party. 1990–92 she was a member of the board of the National Export Credits Guarantee Board, 1988–92 she was vice chair of the Swedish Agency for International Technical and Economic Co-operation (BITS) and 1990–92 vice chair of the OECD development committee Development Assistance Committee (DAC).

In 2006, she was listed as a founding member of the Gapminder Foundation.

She has written several articles and co-authored books about international development.
