= Helena Scutt =

American sailor

Personal information
- Nationality: American
- Born: June 15, 1992 (age 34) Cheltenham, England, United Kingdom
- Height: 5 ft 7 in (1.71 m) (2016)
- Weight: 143 lb (65 kg) (2016)

Sport
- Country: United States
- Sport: Sailing
Medal record
Sailing
Representing United States
Pan American Games
Bronze medal – third place	2015 Toronto	49er FX

Helena Scutt (born June 15, 1992) is a British-born American competitive sailor. She is originally from Great Britain, emigrating to the United States at the age of two before getting citizenship.

She competed for United States at the 2016 Summer Olympics in Rio de Janeiro, in the women's 49erFX.
