= Erin Rafuse =

Canadian sailor

Erin Rafuse (born December 2, 1988, in Halifax, Nova Scotia) is a Canadian sailor. Along with partner Danielle Boyd, Rafuse finished in sixth place at the 2015 Pan American Games. Rafuse and Boyd also qualified to compete at the 2016 Summer Olympics in the 49erFX, finishing 16th.
