= Cadet (album) =

Studio album by Cadet
- Released: April 24, 2001
- Genres: CCM, Christian rock, Christian alternative rock, blues rock, emo, garage rock, indie rock, new wave, pop punk, power pop, pop rock, punk rock, rockabilly
- Length: 43:13
- Label: BEC
- Producer: Neill King

Cadet chronology
Cadet (2001)	The Observatory (2002)

Cadet is the debut studio album by Cadet. BEC Recordings released the album on April 24, 2001. Cadet worked with producer, Neill King, in the production of this album.

== Critical reception ==
Professional ratings
Review scores
Source	Rating
AllMusic	4/5 stars
CCM Magazine	3/5 stars
Cross Rhythms	9/10 squares
The Phantom Tollbooth	3/5

Awarding the album three stars from CCM Magazine, David McCreary states, "this band's self-titled debut achieves in a riveting and surprisingly mature first record." Steve Losey, giving the album four stars for AllMusic, writes, "Cadet offers a disc brimming with sweet melodies, hooky riffs, and simple lyrics that passionately declare truth." Rating the album a nine out of ten at Cross Rhythms, Mike Rimmer says, "More new wave power pop than old school punk, Cadet put some welcome subtlety into the mix and thus set themselves apart from the crowd." Bert Gangl, awarding the album a three out of five for The Phantom Tollbooth, opines, "Cadet album serves, at best, as a mixed blessing for either set of fans." Reviewing the album for Christianity Today, Andy Argyrakis describes, "Cadet's ability to freely express themselves in an easy to identify with manner is exactly where their niche lies. Granted, nothing they've written or played on the disc is breathtaking, monumental, or the next major wave of phenomenal success, but it's just good old fun—exactly what pop music is supposed to be."

== Track listing ==
All tracks are written by Cadet and Ryan Smith.

Track list
No.	Title	Length
1.	"Speed of Sound"	2:32
2.	"God-Man (Jesus Is My Superhero)"	3:15
3.	"Precious One"	3:14
4.	"The Girl"	4:11
5.	"Gremmy (A Surfer's Lament)"	3:12
6.	"I'm a Believer"	3:29
7.	"Fantasy"	3:19
8.	"Beyond"	4:12
9.	"Talent Show"	1:57
10.	"Dream"	2:59
11.	"Spoon"	3:32
12.	"Crack This Code"	3:26
13.	"Land of the Living"	3:55
Total length:		43:13
