= Martine Grael =

Brazilian sailor (born 1991)

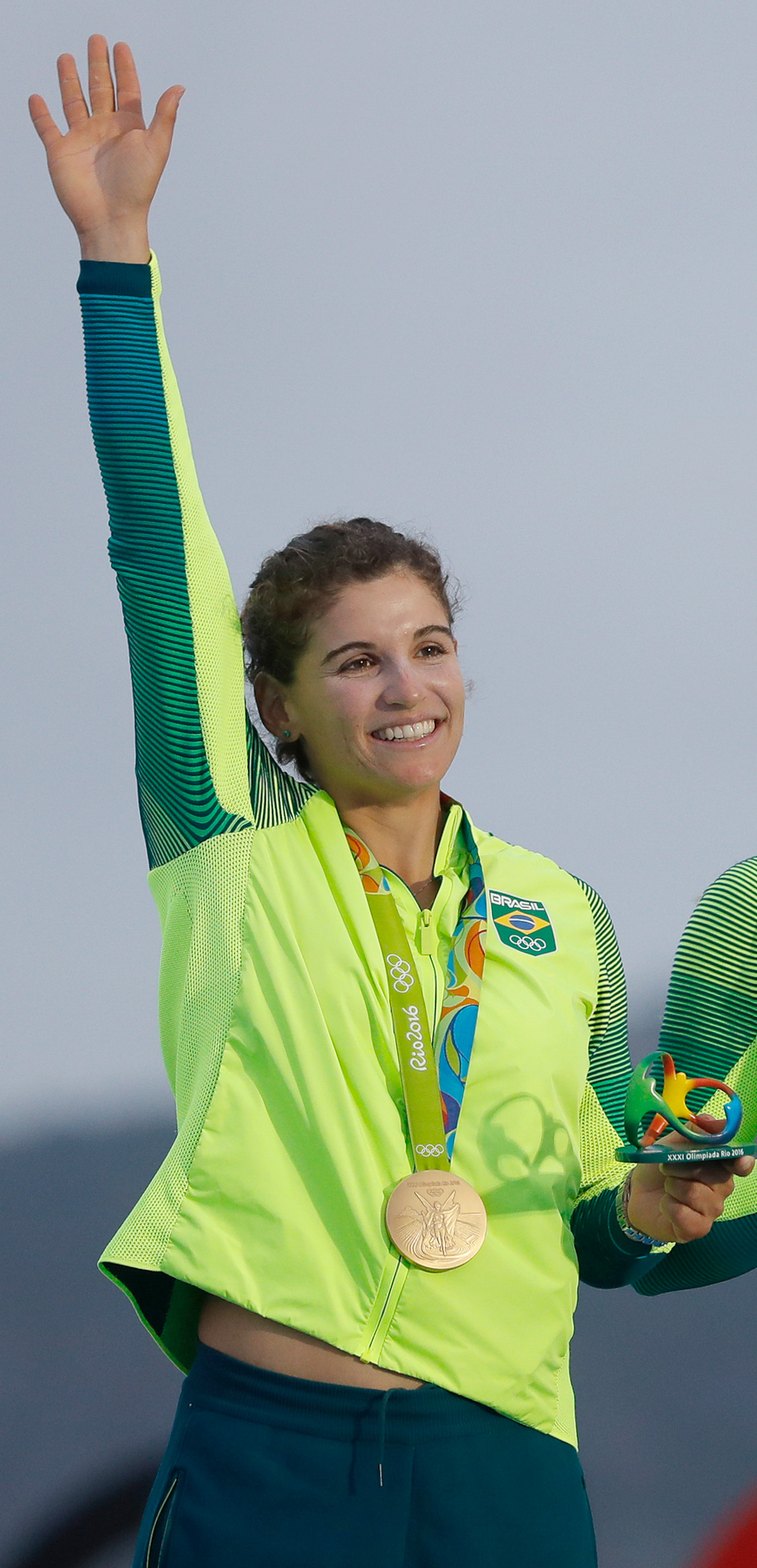
- Grael at the 2016 Summer Olympics

Personal information
- Full name: Martine Soffiatti Grael
- Born: 12 February 1991 (age 35) Niterói, Rio de Janeiro, Brazil
- Height: 1.68 m (5 ft 6 in)
- Weight: 62 kg (137 lb)

Sailing career
- Sport: Sailing
- Club: Rio Yacht Club
- Coached by: Javier Torres del Moral
- Classes: 420; 470; 49er FX
Medal record
Sailing
Representing Brazil
Olympic Games
Gold medal – first place	2016 Rio de Janeiro	49er FX
Gold medal – first place	2020 Tokyo	49er FX
World Championships
Gold medal – first place	2014 Santander	49er FX
Silver medal – second place	2013 Marseille	49er FX
Silver medal – second place	2015 Buenos Aires	49er FX
Silver medal – second place	2017 Matosinhos	49er FX
Silver medal – second place	2019 Auckland	49er FX
Bronze medal – third place	2021 Al-Mussanah	49er FX
Pan American Games
Gold medal – first place	2019 Lima	49er FX
Gold medal – first place	2023 Santiago	49er FX
Silver medal – second place	2015 Toronto	49er FX
Universiade
Bronze medal – third place	2011 Shenzhen	Team 470

Martine Soffiatti Grael (Note: This name uses Portuguese naming customs: the first or maternal family name is Soffiatti and the second or paternal family name is Grael.) (born 12 February 1991) is a Brazilian sailor in the 49er FX class. Together with Kahena Kunze, she won the 49er FX class at the 2014 ISAF Sailing World Championships and at the 2016 Rio Olympics, and 2020 Tokyo Olympics.

== Career ==
Martine Grael was born 12 February 1991 in Niterói, Rio de Janeiro, Brazil, the daughter of Olympic sailing gold medalist Torben Grael. Her brother Marco and uncle Lars also sailed in the Olympics.

In 2012, she competed with Isabel Swan in the 470 sailing class. The two came just short of representing Brazil in the sport at the 2012 Olympics after losing out to Fernanda Oliveira and Ana Barbachan in a tie-breaker during the 2011–12 ISAF Sailing World Cup.

Grael then sailed with Kahena Kunze in the Olympic debuting 49er FX event. The two became World champions in the 49er FX class at the 2014 ISAF Sailing World Championships The duo then won the event at the 2016 Rio Olympics.

She sailed with Team AkzoNobel in the 2017–18 Volvo Ocean Race. In 2024, Grael was designated captain of the debuting Brazilian team that would compete at the SailGP championship.

Grael and Kunze also won the 49er FX event at the 2020 Summer Olympics.

In 2025, she led the Mubadala Brazil SailGP Team, as the first female driver in the history of the series.

== Achievements ==
As of 3 August 2021

Year	Competition	Venue	Position	Event
2009	ISAF Youth World Championships		7th	29er class
2008	420 World Championships	Athens, Greece	4th	420 class
2009	420 World Championships	Lake Garda, Italy	4th	420 class
2009	ISAF Youth World Championships	Búzios, Brazil	1st	420 class
2010	470 World Championships	The Hague, Netherlands	7th	470 class
2011	ISAF Sailing World Championships	Perth, Australia	8th	470 class
2011	2011 Summer Universiade	Shenzhen, China	3rd	470 class team event
2012	470 World Championships	Barcelona, Spain	8th	470 class
2013	49er & 49er FX World Championships	Marseille, France	2nd	49er FX class
2014	ISAF Sailing World Championships	Santander, Spain	1st	49er FX class
2015	49er & 49er FX World Championships	Buenos Aires, Argentina	2nd	49er FX class
2016	49er & 49er FX World Championships	Clearwater, USA	6th	49er FX class
2016	2016 Summer Olympics	Rio de Janeiro, Brazil	1st	49er FX class
2017	49er & 49er FX World Championships	Matosinhos, Portugal	2nd	49er FX class
2019	49er & 49er FX World Championships	Auckland, New Zealand	2nd	49er FX class
2021	2020 Summer Olympics	Enoshima, Japan	1st	49er FX class
2021	49er & 49er FX World Championships	Al-Mussanah, Oman	3rd	49er FX class

== Notes ==
Awards
Preceded by Poliana Okimoto	Brazilian Sportswomen of the Year alongside Kahena Kunze; 2014	Succeeded by Incumbent
