= Cadet (dinghy) =

Class of sailing dinghy for youths

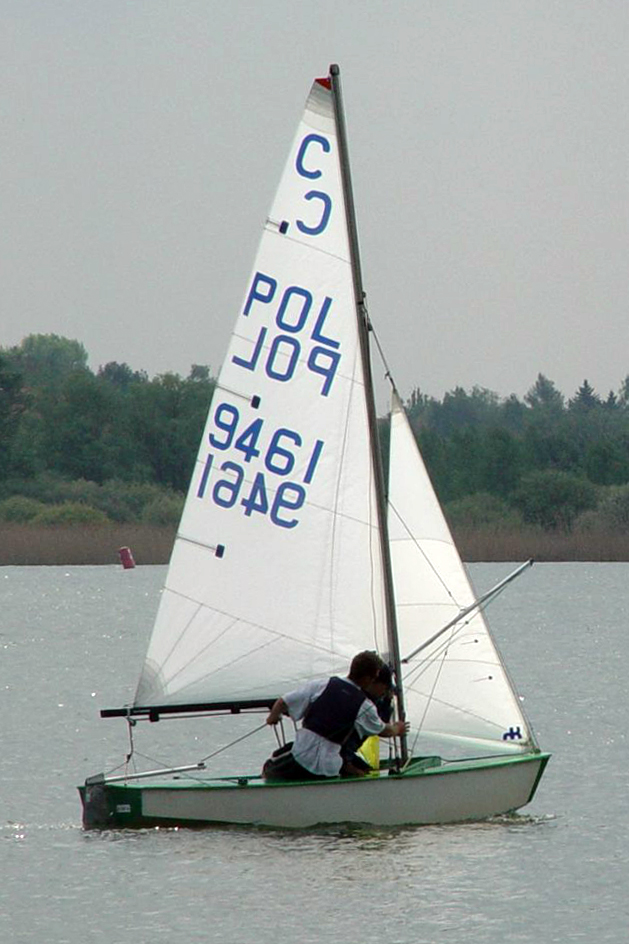
- A Cadet class dinghy POL 9461

Development
- Designer: Jack Holt
- Year: 1947
- Design: One-Design
- Role: Junior class
- Name: Cadet

Boat
- Crew: 2
- Draft: 0.16 m (without centreboard)
- Trapeze: none

Hull
- Type: Monohull
- Construction: Plywood or foam sandwich
- Hull weight: 54 kg (119 lbs)
- LOA: 3.2 m (10 ft)
- Beam: 1.38 m (4 ft 6 in)

Hull appendages
- Keel: Centerboard

Rig
- Rig type: Bermuda
- Mast height: 5.22 m (17.1 ft)

Sails
- Mainsail area: 3.9 m^{2}
- Jib/genoa area: 1.26 m^{2}
- Spinnaker area: 4.25 m^{2}

Racing
- RYA PN: 1432

The Cadet is a class of sailing dinghy designed to be sailed by two children up to the age of 17. It is a one-design class, originally designed by Jack Holt in 1947. Cadets are sailed worldwide in more than 40 countries.

== History ==
In 1947, Yachting World organised a design competition for a beginners' sailing dinghy that the current Cadet-design won.

== Design ==
The boat is crewed by two people and sails with a bermuda rigged mainsail, jib and spinnaker. The Cadet is the only recognised two persons youth-boat by World Sailing (formerly ISAF) as an International Competitive Youth Sailing Class since 1958. Over 10,000 Cadets have been built worldwide by registered licensed builders on four continents. The Cadet is sailed internationally throughout Europe, Asia, Australia and South America. Originally made of wood, the majority of the international fleet is now constructed of fibreglass. The strongest fleets are currently situated in Ukraine, Poland, Belgium, Australia and Argentina. Argentine sailors won 14 world championships in the 20-year period between 1991 and 2010. The Cadet is 3.2 metres long, 1.38 m wide, and weighs 54 kilograms. With the centerboard up, the hull draft is 16 cm; the mast is deck-stepped and 5.22 m high, the mainsail area is 3.9 m^{2}, the jib 1.26 m^{2} and the spinnaker 4.25 m^{2}. The side decks are designed so that a capsize normally does not fill the hull with water. In a mixed fleet, the Cadet has a Portsmouth Yardstick handicap of 1428, the second-slowest in the PY scheme.

== Events ==
The class most important competition is the Cadet World Championship.

== See also ==
- International Cadet Australian Championship
- 50th Redlands International Cadet Australian Championship
