= Kahena Kunze =

Brazilian sailor (born 1991)

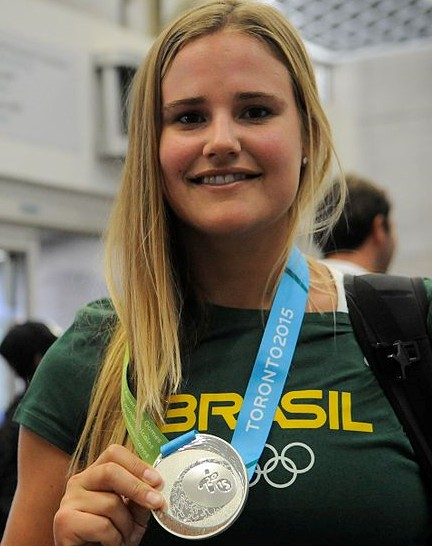
- Kunze at the 2015 Pan American Games

Personal information
- Born: 12 March 1991 (age 35) São Paulo, Brazil
- Height: 172 cm (5 ft 8 in)
- Weight: 68 kg (150 lb)

Sailing career
- Sport: Sailing
- Club: Iate Clube do Rio de Janeiro
- Coached by: Javier Torres del Moral
- Classes: 470; 49er FX
Medal record
Sailing
Representing Brazil
Olympic Games
Gold medal – first place	2016 Rio de Janeiro	49er FX
Gold medal – first place	2020 Tokyo	49er FX
World Championships
Gold medal – first place	2014 Santander	49er FX
Silver medal – second place	2013 Marseille	49er FX
Silver medal – second place	2015 Buenos Aires	49er FX
Silver medal – second place	2017 Matosinhos	49er FX
Silver medal – second place	2019 Auckland	49er FX
Bronze medal – third place	2021 Al-Mussanah	49er FX
Pan American Games
Gold medal – first place	2019 Lima	49er FX
Gold medal – first place	2023 Santiago	49er FX
Silver medal – second place	2015 Toronto	49er FX

Kahena Kunze (born 12 March 1991) is a Brazilian sailor in the 49er FX class. Together with Martine Grael she won the 49er FX class at the 2014 ISAF Sailing World Championships and a gold medal in the inaugural 49er FX race, during the 2016 Rio Olympics, a feat both repeated at Tokyo 2020.

In 2025 Kahena sailed for the Brazil SailGP Team in the SailGP competition, in 2026 she joined the Danish team as strategist.

== Personal life ==
She is the daughter of Claudio Kunze, a former sailor who won a junior world championship in the Penguin class. Her name is an homage to the warrior Kahina.

== Achievements ==
As of 27 September 2015

Year	Competition	Venue	Position	Event
2010	470 World Championships	The Hague, Netherlands	7th	470 class
2011	ISAF Sailing World Championships	Perth, Australia	8th	470 class
2012	470 World Championships	Barcelona, Spain	8th	470 class
2013	49er & 49er FX World Championships	Marseille, France	2nd	49er FX class
2014	ISAF Sailing World Championships	Santander, Spain	1st	49er FX class
2015	49er & 49er FX World Championships	Buenos Aires, Argentina	2nd	49er FX class
2016	49er & 49er FX World Championships	Clearwater, USA	6th	49er FX class
2016	2016 Summer Olympics	Rio de Janeiro, Brazil	1st	49er FX class
2017	49er & 49er FX World Championships	Matosinhos, Portugal	2nd	49er FX class
2019	49er & 49er FX World Championships	Auckland, New Zealand	2nd	49er FX class
2021	2020 Summer Olympics	Tokyo, Japan	1st	49er FX class
2021	49er & 49er FX World Championships	Al-Mussanah, Oman	3rd	49er FX class

Awards
Preceded by Poliana Okimoto	Brazilian Sportswomen of the Year alongside Martine Grael; 2014	Succeeded by Incumbent
