= Kadets =

Kadets may refer to:

- Mikhail Kadets, mathematician
- Members of the Constitutional Democratic Party, a political party in the Russian Empire

== See also ==
- Cadet (disambiguation)
