= Kadett =

Officer candidates in Swedish military

Kadett corresponds to cadet in English and is a term used in Sweden to denote officer candidates studying in order to become an officer. There are basically two ways to become officer as described below.

== Specialist Officers (SO) ==
Direct recruitment from civilian life is followed by basic and preparatory leadership training, before joining cadets promoted from lower ranks, during the advanced leadership training during 1.5 year as a specialist cadet at the military academy in Halmstad, leading to a warrant as an OR-6, followed by specialist technical training. Swedish specialist officers have relative ranks that match those of the commissioned officers; an OR-7 takes precedence over a second lieutenant, for instance.

== Regular "Tactical" Officers ==
Candidates study three years at the Swedish Defence University with the aim to gain proficiency as commanders at platoon level. Students major in War Science, Military Technology, or Maritime matters. Four semesters include general education and are located at the Military Academy Karlberg. The other two semesters are located at one of the branch schools and include specific training for the profession.

== Admission Requirements ==
=== Education ===
High School diploma or equivalent. Depending on choice of profile, there may be other requirements.

=== Military ===
- 11 Months of conscript training

alternatively

- 3 months of preparatory training followed by 3 months of specialized training.

=== Physical ===
- Regardless of branch, all applicants must meet a set of standard requirements

== See also ==
- Military ranks of the Swedish Armed Forces
- Officer Training
- http://www.mhsk.mil.se/attachments/school_system_2006--.pdf%5B%5D
