= María Sol Branz =

Argentine sailor (born 1990)

Sol Branz
Personal information
- Full name: María Sol Branz
- Born: 6 February 1990 (age 36) Martínez, San Isidro, Argentina
- Height: 170 cm (5 ft 7 in)
- Weight: 68 kg (150 lb)

Sailing career
- Sport: Sailing
- Club: Yacht Club Argentino
- Class(es): 49erFX, 29er, 49er
Medal record
Women's sailing
Representing Argentina
Pan American Games
Gold medal – first place	2015 Toronto	49erFX
Bronze medal – third place	2019 Lima	49erFX

María Sol Branz (born 6 February 1990), known as Sol Branz, is an Argentine sailor. She and Victoria Travascio won a gold medal in the women's 49erFX event at the 2015 Pan American Games, and bronze in the 2019 edition.

The two also competed in two Olympic Games, finishing 13th in the 49erFX event at the 2016 Summer Olympics, and fifth at the 2020 Summer Olympics.
