= Chronological summary of the 2024 Summer Olympics =

This is a chronological summary of the major events of the 2024 Summer Olympics in Paris and other venues in Metropolitan France, plus one subsite in Tahiti in the overseas country of French Polynesia. Competition began on 24 July with the first matches in the group stages of football and rugby sevens events. The opening ceremony was held two days later on 26 July. The last day of competition and the closing ceremony was held on 11 August.

The games included 329 events in 32 different sports. Breakdancing made its debut as an Olympic event.

== Calendar ==
Competition began two days before the opening ceremony on 26 July, and ended on 11 August 2024.

On 29 July, the weather in Tahiti turned dangerous towards the end of round 3 of the men's shortboard event, forcing the cancellation of the women's third round. The waves continued to be too rough for competition over the next two days, leaving the remaining of the surfing finals moved to 5 August.

All times and dates use Central European Summer Time (UTC+2); except Tahiti uses UTC-10

OC	Opening ceremony	●	Event competitions	1	Gold medal events	CC	Closing ceremony

July/August 2024		July								August											Events
July/August 2024		24th Wed	25th Thu	26th Fri	27th Sat	28th Sun	29th Mon	30th Tue	31st Wed	1st Thu	2nd Fri	3rd Sat	4th Sun	5th Mon	6th Tue	7th Wed	8th Thu	9th Fri	10th Sat	11th Sun	Events
Ceremonies				OC																CC	—N/a
Aquatics	Artistic swimming													●	●	1		●	1		2
Aquatics	Diving				1		1		1		1			●	1	●	1	1	1		8
Aquatics	Marathon swimming																1	1			2
Aquatics	Swimming				4	3	5	3	5	4	3	4	4								35
Aquatics	Water polo				●	●	●	●	●	●	●	●	●	●	●	●	●	●	1	1	2
Archery			●			1	1	●	●	●	1	1	1								5
Athletics										2	1	5	3	4	5	5	5	8	9	1	48
Badminton					●	●	●	●	●	●	1	1	1	2							5
Basketball	Basketball				●	●	●	●	●	●	●	●	●		●	●	●	●	1	1	2
Basketball	3×3 Basketball							●	●	●	●	●	●	2							2
Boxing					●	●	●	●	●	●	●	●	●		1	2	2	4	4		13
Breaking																		1	1		2
Canoeing	Slalom				●	1	1	●	1	1	●	●	●	2							6
Canoeing	Sprint														●	●	3	4	3		10
Cycling	Road cycling				2							1	1								4
Cycling	Track cycling													1	1	2	2	2	1	3	12
Cycling	BMX							●	2	●	2										4
Cycling	Mountain biking					1	1														2
Equestrian
Equestrian	Dressage							●	●			1	1								2
Equestrian	Eventing				●	●	2														2
Equestrian	Jumping									●	1			●	1						2
Fencing					2	2	2	1	1	1	1	1	1								12
Field hockey					●	●	●	●	●	●	●	●	●	●	●	●	1	1			2
Football		●	●		●	●		●	●		●	●		●	●		●	1	1		2
Golf										●	●	●	1			●	●	●	1		2
Gymnastics	Artistic				●	●	1	1	1	1		3	3	4							14
Gymnastics	Rhythmic																●	1	1		2
Gymnastics	Trampoline										2										2
Handball			●		●	●	●	●	●	●	●	●	●		●	●	●	●	1	1	2
Judo					2	2	2	2	2	2	2	1									15
Modern pentathlon																	●	●	1	1	2
Rowing					●	●	●	●	2	4	4	4									14
Rugby sevens		●	●		1	●	●	1													2
Sailing						●	●	●	●	●	2	2	●	●	●	2	3	1			10
Shooting					1	2	2	2	1	1	1	2	1	2							15
Skateboarding						1	1								1	1					4
Sport climbing														●	●	1	1	1	1		4
Surfing					●	●	●			●				2							2
Table tennis					●	●	●	1	●	●	●	1	1	●	●	●	●	1	1		5
Taekwondo																2	2	2	2		8
Tennis					●	●	●	●	●	●	1	2	2								5
Triathlon									2					1							3
Volleyball	Beach volleyball				●	●	●	●	●	●	●	●	●	●	●	●	●	1	1		2
Volleyball	Volleyball				●	●	●	●	●	●	●	●	●	●	●	●	●	●	1	1	2
Weightlifting																2	2	2	3	1	10
Wrestling														●	3	3	3	3	3	3	18
Daily medal events		0			13	13	19	11	18	16	23	29	20	20	13	21	26	35	39	13	329
Cumulative total		0			13	26	45	56	74	90	113	142	162	182	195	216	242	277	316	329	329
July/August 2024
July/August 2024		24th Wed	25th Thu	26th Fri	27th Sat	28th Sun	29th Mon	30th Tue	31st Wed	1st Thu	2nd Fri	3rd Sat	4th Sun	5th Mon	6th Tue	7th Wed	8th Thu	9th Fri	10th Sat	11th Sun	Total events
July/August 2024		July								August											Total events

== Medal table ==
Key

‡ Changes in medal standings (see here)

* Host nation (France)

2024 Summer Olympics medal table (Note: Although the IOC does not include Individual Neutral Athletes in the official medal tables, they are listed here for comparison purposes.) (Note: Figures in table reflect all official changes in medal standings.)
Rank	NOC	Gold	Silver	Bronze	Total
1	United States‡	40	44	42	126
2	China	40	27	24	91
3	Japan	20	12	13	45
4	Australia	18	19	16	53
5	France*	16	26	22	64
6	Netherlands	15	7	12	34
7	Great Britain	14	22	29	65
8	South Korea	13	9	10	32
9	Italy	12	13	15	40
10	Germany	12	13	8	33
11–91	Remaining NOCs	129	138	194	461
Totals (91 entries)		329	330	385	1,044

== Day-by-day summaries ==
=== 24 July ===
Football

- The first day of group stage matches of the men's tournament.

Rugby sevens

- The first day of pool stage matches of the men's tournament.

=== 25 July ===
Archery

- The ranking rounds of both the men's individual and women's individual events.

Football

- The first matches in the group stage of the women's tournament.

Handball

- The first matches in the group stage of the women's tournament.

Rugby sevens

- The second and final day of pool stage matches, the first day of placing matches, and the quarter-finals of the men's tournament.

=== 26 July ===
Opening ceremony

- The opening ceremony took place outside a traditional stadium setting for the first time, with the parade of nations conducted as a boat parade along the Seine from Pont d'Austerlitz to Pont d'Iéna, with the official protocol taking place at Place du Trocadéro in a temporary "mini-stadium". The 6-kilometre (3.7-mile) parade route featured cultural presentations and views of Paris landmarks.

=== Day 1: 27 July ===
Sport	Event	Gold medalist(s)			Silver medalist(s)		Bronze medalist(s)		Ref
Sport	Event	Competitor(s)	Team	Rec	Competitor(s)	Team	Competitor(s)	Team	Ref
Cycling	Men's road time trial	Remco Evenepoel	Belgium		Filippo Ganna	Italy	Wout van Aert	Belgium	
Cycling	Women's road time trial	Grace Brown	Australia		Anna Henderson	Great Britain	Chloé Dygert	United States	
Diving	Women's 3 m synchronized springboard	Chen Yiwen; Chang Yani	China		Sarah Bacon; Kassidy Cook	United States	Yasmin Harper; Scarlett Mew Jensen	Great Britain	
Fencing	Men's sabre	Oh Sang-uk	South Korea		Farès Ferjani	Tunisia	Luigi Samele	Italy	
Fencing	Women's épée	Vivian Kong	Hong Kong		Auriane Mallo	France	Eszter Muhari	Hungary	
Judo	Men's 60 kg	Yeldos Smetov	Kazakhstan		Luka Mkheidze	France	Ryuju Nagayama	Japan	
Judo	Men's 60 kg	Yeldos Smetov	Kazakhstan		Luka Mkheidze	France	Francisco Garrigós	Spain	
Judo	Women's 48 kg	Natsumi Tsunoda	Japan		Bavuudorjiin Baasankhüü	Mongolia	Shirine Boukli	France	
Judo	Women's 48 kg	Natsumi Tsunoda	Japan		Bavuudorjiin Baasankhüü	Mongolia	Tara Babulfath	Sweden	
Rugby sevens	Men's	Jean-Pascal Barraque; Antoine Dupont; Théo Forner; Aaron Grandidier Nkanang; Jefferson Lee Joseph; Stephen Parez; Varian Pasquet; Rayan Rebbadj; Paulin Riva; Jordan Sepho; Andy Timo; Antoine Zeghdar; Nelson Epee	France		Joseva Talacolo; Iosefo Masi; Iowane Teba; Sevuloni Mocenacagi; Josaia Raisuqe; Jeremia Matana; Terio Tamani; Ponepati Loganimasi; Selestino Ravutaumada; Jerry Tuwai; Kaminieli Rasaku; Waisea Nacuqu; Joji Nasova; Filipe Sauturaga	Fiji	Christie Grobbelaar; Ryan Oosthuizen; Impi Visser; Zain Davids; Quewin Nortje; Tiaan Pretorius; Shaun Williams; Selvyn Davids; Tristan Leyds; Rosko Specman; Siviwe Soyizwapi; Shilton van Wyk; Ronald Brown	South Africa	
Shooting	Mixed 10 m air rifle team	Huang Yuting; Sheng Lihao	China		Keum Ji-hyeon; Park Ha-jun	South Korea	Alexandra Le; Islam Satpayev	Kazakhstan	
Swimming	Men's 400 m freestyle	Lukas Märtens	Germany		Elijah Winnington	Australia	Kim Woo-min	South Korea	
Swimming	Men's 4 × 100 m freestyle relay	Jack Alexy; Chris Guiliano; Hunter Armstrong; Caeleb Dressel; Ryan Held; Matthew King	United States		Jack Cartwright; Flynn Southam; Kai Taylor; Kyle Chalmers; William Yang	Australia	Alessandro Miressi; Thomas Ceccon; Paolo Conte Bonin; Manuel Frigo; Leonardo Deplano; Lorenzo Zazzeri	Italy	
Swimming	Women's 400 m freestyle	Ariarne Titmus	Australia		Summer McIntosh	Canada	Katie Ledecky	United States	
Swimming	Women's 4 × 100 m freestyle relay	Mollie O'Callaghan; Shayna Jack; Emma McKeon; Meg Harris; Bronte Campbell; Olivia Wunsch	Australia	OR	Kate Douglass; Gretchen Walsh; Torri Huske; Simone Manuel; Erika Connolly; Abbey Weitzeil	United States	Yang Junxuan; Cheng Yujie; Zhang Yufei; Wu Qingfeng; Yu Yiting	China	

=== Day 2: 28 July ===
Sport	Event	Gold medalist(s)			Silver medalist(s)		Bronze medalist(s)		Ref
Sport	Event	Competitor(s)	Team	Rec	Competitor(s)	Team	Competitor(s)	Team	Ref
Archery	Women's team	Jeon Hun-young; Lim Si-hyeon; Nam Su-hyeon	South Korea		An Qixuan; Li Jiaman; Yang Xiaolei	China	Ángela Ruiz; Alejandra Valencia; Ana Paula Vázquez	Mexico	
Canoeing	Women's K-1	Jessica Fox	Australia		Klaudia Zwolińska	Poland	Kimberley Woods	Great Britain	
Cycling	Women's cross-country	Pauline Ferrand-Prévot	France		Haley Batten	United States	Jenny Rissveds	Sweden	
Fencing	Men's épée	Koki Kano	Japan		Yannick Borel	France	Mohamed El-Sayed	Egypt	
Fencing	Women's foil	Lee Kiefer	United States		Lauren Scruggs	United States	Eleanor Harvey	Canada	
Judo	Men's 66 kg	Hifumi Abe	Japan		Willian Lima	Brazil	Gusman Kyrgyzbayev	Kazakhstan	
Judo	Men's 66 kg	Hifumi Abe	Japan		Willian Lima	Brazil	Denis Vieru	Moldova	
Judo	Women's 52 kg	Diyora Keldiyorova	Uzbekistan		Distria Krasniqi	Kosovo	Larissa Pimenta	Brazil	
Judo	Women's 52 kg	Diyora Keldiyorova	Uzbekistan		Distria Krasniqi	Kosovo	Amandine Buchard	France	
Shooting	Men's 10 m air pistol	Xie Yu	China		Federico Nilo Maldini	Italy	Paolo Monna	Italy	
Shooting	Women's 10 m air pistol	Oh Ye-jin	South Korea		Kim Ye-ji	South Korea	Manu Bhaker	India	
Skateboarding	Women's street	Coco Yoshizawa	Japan		Liz Akama	Japan	Rayssa Leal	Brazil	
Swimming	Men's 100 m breaststroke	Nicolò Martinenghi	Italy		Adam Peaty	Great Britain	Not awarded due to a tie for silver		
Swimming	Men's 100 m breaststroke	Nicolò Martinenghi	Italy		Nic Fink	United States	Not awarded due to a tie for silver		
Swimming	Men's 400 m individual medley	Léon Marchand	France	OR	Tomoyuki Matsushita	Japan	Carson Foster	United States	
Swimming	Women's 100 m butterfly	Torri Huske	United States		Gretchen Walsh	United States	Zhang Yufei	China	

=== Day 3: 29 July ===
Sport	Event	Gold medalist(s)			Silver medalist(s)		Bronze medalist(s)		Ref
Sport	Event	Competitor(s)	Team	Rec	Competitor(s)	Team	Competitor(s)	Team	Ref
Archery	Men's team	Kim Je-deok; Kim Woo-jin; Lee Woo-seok	South Korea		Baptiste Addis; Thomas Chirault; Jean-Charles Valladont	France	Mete Gazoz; Ulaş Tümer; Muhammed Yıldırmış	Turkey	
Canoeing	Men's C-1	Nicolas Gestin	France		Adam Burgess	Great Britain	Matej Beňuš	Slovakia	
Cycling	Men's cross-country	Tom Pidcock	Great Britain		Victor Koretzky	France	Alan Hatherly	South Africa	
Diving	Men's 10 m synchronized platform	Yang Hao; Lian Junjie	China		Tom Daley; Noah Williams	Great Britain	Rylan Wiens; Nathan Zsombor-Murray	Canada	
Equestrian	Individual eventing	Michael Jung	Germany		Christopher Burton	Australia	Laura Collett	Great Britain	
Equestrian	Team eventing	Rosalind Canter; Tom McEwen; Laura Collett	Great Britain		Nicolas Touzaint; Karim Laghouag; Stéphane Landois	France	Toshiyuki Tanaka; Kazuma Tomoto; Yoshiaki Oiwa; Ryuzo Kitajima	Japan	
Fencing	Men's foil	Cheung Ka Long	Hong Kong		Filippo Macchi	Italy	Nick Itkin	United States	
Fencing	Women's sabre	Manon Brunet	France		Sara Balzer	France	Olga Kharlan	Ukraine	
Gymnastics	Men's team all-around	Daiki Hashimoto; Kaya Kazuma; Shinnosuke Oka; Takaaki Sugino; Tanigawa Wataru	Japan		Liu Yang; Su Weide; Xiao Ruoteng; Zhang Boheng; Zou Jingyuan	China	Asher Hong; Paul Juda; Brody Malone; Stephen Nedoroscik; Fred Richard	United States	
Judo	Men's 73 kg	Hidayat Heydarov	Azerbaijan		Joan-Benjamin Gaba	France	Soichi Hashimoto	Japan	
Judo	Men's 73 kg	Hidayat Heydarov	Azerbaijan		Joan-Benjamin Gaba	France	Adil Osmanov	Moldova	
Judo	Women's 57 kg	Christa Deguchi	Canada		Huh Mi-mi	South Korea	Sarah-Léonie Cysique	France	
Judo	Women's 57 kg	Christa Deguchi	Canada		Huh Mi-mi	South Korea	Haruka Funakubo	Japan	
Shooting	Men's 10 m air rifle	Sheng Lihao	China	OR	Victor Lindgren	Sweden	Miran Maričić	Croatia	
Shooting	Women's 10 m air rifle	Ban Hyo-jin	South Korea	OR	Huang Yuting	China	Audrey Gogniat	Switzerland	
Skateboarding	Men's street	Yuto Horigome	Japan		Jagger Eaton	United States	Nyjah Huston	United States	
Swimming	Men's 100 m backstroke	Thomas Ceccon	Italy		Xu Jiayu	China	Ryan Murphy	United States	
Swimming	Men's 200 m freestyle	David Popovici	Romania		Matt Richards	Great Britain	Luke Hobson	United States	
Swimming	Women's 100 m breaststroke	Tatjana Smith	South Africa		Tang Qianting	China	Mona McSharry	Ireland	
Swimming	Women's 200 m freestyle	Mollie O'Callaghan	Australia	OR	Ariarne Titmus	Australia	Siobhán Haughey	Hong Kong	
Swimming	Women's 400 m individual medley	Summer McIntosh	Canada		Katie Grimes	United States	Emma Weyant	United States	

=== Day 4: 30 July ===
Sport	Event	Gold medalist(s)			Silver medalist(s)		Bronze medalist(s)		Ref
Sport	Event	Competitor(s)	Team	Rec	Competitor(s)	Team	Competitor(s)	Team	Ref
Fencing	Women's team épée	Rossella Fiamingo; Mara Navarria; Giulia Rizzi; Alberta Santuccio	Italy		Marie-Florence Candassamy; Alexandra Louis-Marie; Auriane Mallo; Coraline Vitalis	France	Aleksandra Jarecka; Alicja Klasik; Renata Knapik-Miazga; Martyna Swatowska-Wenglarczyk	Poland	
Gymnastics	Women's team all-around	Simone Biles; Jade Carey; Jordan Chiles; Sunisa Lee; Hezly Rivera	United States		Angela Andreoli; Alice D'Amato; Manila Esposito; Elisa Iorio; Giorgia Villa	Italy	Rebeca Andrade; Jade Barbosa; Lorrane Oliveira; Flávia Saraiva; Júlia Soares	Brazil	
Judo	Men's 81 kg	Takanori Nagase	Japan		Tato Grigalashvili	Georgia	Lee Joon-hwan	South Korea	
Judo	Men's 81 kg	Takanori Nagase	Japan		Tato Grigalashvili	Georgia	Somon Makhmadbekov	Tajikistan	
Judo	Women's 63 kg	Andreja Leški	Slovenia		Prisca Awiti Alcaraz	Mexico	Clarisse Agbegnenou	France	
Judo	Women's 63 kg	Andreja Leški	Slovenia		Prisca Awiti Alcaraz	Mexico	Laura Fazliu	Kosovo	
Rugby sevens	Women's	Michaela Blyde; Jazmin Felix-Hotham; Sarah Hirini; Tyla King; Jorja Miller; Manaia Nuku; Mahina Paul; Risaleeana Pouri-Lane; Alena Saili; Theresa Setefano; Stacey Waaka; Portia Woodman-Wickliffe	New Zealand		Caroline Crossley; Olivia Apps; Alysha Corrigan; Asia Hogan-Rochester; Chloe Daniels; Charity Williams; Florence Symonds; Carissa Norsten; Krissy Scurfield; Fancy Bermudez; Piper Logan; Keyara Wardley; Taylor Perry; Shalaya Valenzuela	Canada	Alena Olsen; Alev Kelter; Ariana Ramsey; Ilona Maher; Kayla Canett; Kristi Kirshe; Lauren Doyle; Naya Tapper; Sammy Sullivan; Sarah Levy; Spiff Sedrick; Stephanie Rovetti	United States	
Shooting	Men's trap	Nathan Hales	Great Britain	OR	Qi Ying	China	Jean Pierre Brol	Guatemala	
Shooting	Mixed 10 m air pistol team	Zorana Arunović; Damir Mikec	Serbia		Şevval İlayda Tarhan; Yusuf Dikeç	Turkey	Manu Bhaker; Sarabjot Singh	India	
Swimming	Men's 4 × 200 m freestyle relay	James Guy; Tom Dean; Matt Richards; Duncan Scott; Kieran Bird; Jack McMillan	Great Britain		Luke Hobson; Carson Foster; Drew Kibler; Kieran Smith; Brooks Curry; Chris Guiliano; Blake Pieroni	United States	Maximillian Giuliani; Flynn Southam; Elijah Winnington; Thomas Neill; Zac Incerti; Kai Taylor	Australia	
Swimming	Men's 800 m freestyle	Daniel Wiffen	Ireland		Bobby Finke	United States	Gregorio Paltrinieri	Italy	
Swimming	Women's 100 m backstroke	Kaylee McKeown	Australia	OR	Regan Smith	United States	Katharine Berkoff	United States	
Table tennis	Mixed doubles	Wang Chuqin; Sun Yingsha	China		Ri Jong-sik; Kim Kum-yong	North Korea	Lim Jong-hoon; Shin Yu-bin	South Korea	

=== Day 5: 31 July ===
Sport	Event	Gold medalist(s)			Silver medalist(s)		Bronze medalist(s)		Ref
Sport	Event	Competitor(s)	Team	Rec	Competitor(s)	Team	Competitor(s)	Team	Ref
Canoeing	Women's C-1	Jessica Fox	Australia		Elena Lilik	Germany	Evy Leibfarth	United States	
Cycling	Men's BMX freestyle	José Torres	Argentina		Kieran Reilly	Great Britain	Anthony Jeanjean	France	
Cycling	Women's BMX freestyle	Deng Yawen	China		Perris Benegas	United States	Natalya Diehm	Australia	
Diving	Women's 10 m synchronized platform	Chen Yuxi; Quan Hongchan	China		Kim Mi-rae; Jo Jin-mi	North Korea	Andrea Spendolini-Sirieix; Lois Toulson	Great Britain	
Fencing	Men's team sabre	Do Gyeong-dong; Gu Bon-gil; Oh Sang-uk; Park Sang-won	South Korea		Csanád Gémesi; Krisztian Rabb; András Szatmári; Áron Szilágyi	Hungary	Boladé Apithy; Jean-Philippe Patrice; Sébastien Patrice; Maxime Pianfetti	France	
Gymnastics	Men's individual all-around	Shinnosuke Oka	Japan		Zhang Boheng	China	Xiao Ruoteng	China	
Judo	Men's 90 kg	Lasha Bekauri	Georgia		Sanshiro Murao	Japan	Maxime-Gaël Ngayap Hambou	France	
Judo	Men's 90 kg	Lasha Bekauri	Georgia		Sanshiro Murao	Japan	Theodoros Tselidis	Greece	
Judo	Women's 70 kg	Barbara Matić	Croatia		Miriam Butkereit	Germany	Michaela Polleres	Austria	
Judo	Women's 70 kg	Barbara Matić	Croatia		Miriam Butkereit	Germany	Gabriella Willems	Belgium	
Rowing	Men's quadruple sculls	Lennart van Lierop; Finn Florijn; Tone Wieten; Koen Metsemakers	Netherlands		Luca Chiumento; Luca Rambaldi; Giacomo Gentili; Andrea Panizza	Italy	Fabian Barański; Mateusz Biskup; Dominik Czaja; Mirosław Ziętarski	Poland	
Rowing	Women's quadruple sculls	Lauren Henry; Hannah Scott; Lola Anderson; Georgina Brayshaw	Great Britain		Laila Youssifou; Bente Paulis; Roos de Jong; Tessa Dullemans	Netherlands	Maren Völz; Tabea Schendekehl; Leonie Menzel; Pia Greiten	Germany	
Shooting	Women's trap	Adriana Ruano	Guatemala	OR	Silvana Stanco	Italy	Penny Smith	Australia	
Swimming	Men's 100 m freestyle	Pan Zhanle	China	WR	Kyle Chalmers	Australia	David Popovici	Romania	
Swimming	Men's 200 m breaststroke	Léon Marchand	France	OR	Zac Stubblety-Cook	Australia	Caspar Corbeau	Netherlands	
Swimming	Men's 200 m butterfly	Léon Marchand	France	OR	Kristóf Milák	Hungary	Ilya Kharun	Canada	
Swimming	Women's 100 m freestyle	Sarah Sjöström	Sweden		Torri Huske	United States	Siobhán Haughey	Hong Kong	
Swimming	Women's 1500 m freestyle	Katie Ledecky	United States	OR	Anastasiya Kirpichnikova	France	Isabel Marie Gose	Germany	
Triathlon	Men's	Alex Yee	Great Britain		Hayden Wilde	New Zealand	Léo Bergère	France	
Triathlon	Women's	Cassandre Beaugrand	France		Julie Derron	Switzerland	Beth Potter	Great Britain	

=== Day 6: 1 August ===
Sport	Event	Gold medalist(s)			Silver medalist(s)		Bronze medalist(s)		Ref
Sport	Event	Competitor(s)	Team	Rec	Competitor(s)	Team	Competitor(s)	Team	Ref
Athletics	Men's 20 km walk	Brian Pintado	Ecuador		Caio Bonfim	Brazil	Álvaro Martín	Spain	
Athletics	Women's 20 km walk	Yang Jiayu	China		María Pérez	Spain	Jemima Montag	Australia	
Canoeing	Men's K-1	Giovanni De Gennaro	Italy		Titouan Castryck	France	Pau Echaniz	Spain	
Fencing	Women's team foil	Jacqueline Dubrovich; Lee Kiefer; Lauren Scruggs; Maia Weintraub	United States		Arianna Errigo; Martina Favaretto; Francesca Palumbo; Alice Volpi	Italy	Sera Azuma; Yuka Ueno; Karin Miyawaki; Komaki Kikuchi	Japan	
Gymnastics	Women's individual all-around	Simone Biles	United States		Rebeca Andrade	Brazil	Sunisa Lee	United States	
Judo	Men's 100 kg	Zelym Kotsoiev	Azerbaijan		Ilia Sulamanidze	Georgia	Peter Paltchik	Israel	
Judo	Men's 100 kg	Zelym Kotsoiev	Azerbaijan		Ilia Sulamanidze	Georgia	Muzaffarbek Turoboyev	Uzbekistan	
Judo	Women's 78 kg	Alice Bellandi	Italy		Inbar Lanir	Israel	Ma Zhenzhao	China	
Judo	Women's 78 kg	Alice Bellandi	Italy		Inbar Lanir	Israel	Patrícia Sampaio	Portugal	
Rowing	Men's double sculls	Andrei Cornea; Marian Enache	Romania		Melvin Twellaar; Stef Broenink	Netherlands	Daire Lynch; Philip Doyle	Ireland	
Rowing	Men's coxless four	Nick Mead; Justin Best; Michael Grady; Liam Corrigan	United States		Oliver Maclean; Logan Ullrich; Tom Murray; Matt Macdonald	New Zealand	Oliver Wilkes; David Ambler; Matt Aldridge; Freddie Davidson	Great Britain	
Rowing	Women's double sculls	Brooke Francis; Lucy Spoors	New Zealand		Ancuța Bodnar; Simona Radiș	Romania	Mathilda Hodgkins-Byrne; Becky Wilde	Great Britain	
Rowing	Women's coxless four	Benthe Boonstra; Hermijntje Drenth; Tinka Offereins; Marloes Oldenburg	Netherlands		Esme Booth; Helen Glover; Sam Redgrave; Rebecca Shorten	Great Britain	Jackie Gowler; Phoebe Spoors; Davina Waddy; Kerri Williams	New Zealand	
Shooting	Men's 50 m rifle 3 positions	Liu Yukun	China		Serhiy Kulish	Ukraine	Swapnil Kusale	India	
Swimming	Men's 200 m backstroke	Hubert Kós	Hungary		Apostolos Christou	Greece	Roman Mityukov	Switzerland	
Swimming	Women's 200 m breaststroke	Kate Douglass	United States		Tatjana Smith	South Africa	Tes Schouten	Netherlands	
Swimming	Women's 200 m butterfly	Summer McIntosh	Canada	OR	Regan Smith	United States	Zhang Yufei	China	
Swimming	Women's 4 × 200 m freestyle relay	Mollie O'Callaghan; Lani Pallister; Brianna Throssell; Ariarne Titmus; Shayna Jack; Jamie Perkins	Australia	OR	Claire Weinstein; Paige Madden; Katie Ledecky; Erin Gemmell; Simone Manuel; Anna Peplowski; Alex Shackell	United States	Yang Junxuan; Li Bingjie; Ge Chutong; Liu Yaxin; Kong Yaqi; Tang Muhan	China	

=== Day 7: 2 August ===
Sport	Event	Gold medalist(s)			Silver medalist(s)		Bronze medalist(s)		Ref
Sport	Event	Competitor(s)	Team	Rec	Competitor(s)	Team	Competitor(s)	Team	Ref
Archery	Mixed team	Kim Woo-jin; Lim Si-hyeon	South Korea		Florian Unruh; Michelle Kroppen	Germany	Brady Ellison; Casey Kaufhold	United States	
Athletics	Men's 10,000 m	Joshua Cheptegei	Uganda	OR	Berihu Aregawi	Ethiopia	Grant Fisher	United States	
Badminton	Mixed doubles	Zheng Siwei; Huang Yaqiong	China		Kim Won-ho; Jeong Na-eun	South Korea	Arisa Higashino; Yuta Watanabe	Japan	
Cycling	Men's BMX racing	Joris Daudet	France		Sylvain André	France	Romain Mahieu	France	
Cycling	Women's BMX racing	Saya Sakakibara	Australia		Manon Veenstra	Netherlands	Zoé Claessens	Switzerland	
Diving	Men's 3 m synchronized springboard	Wang Zongyuan; Long Daoyi	China		Osmar Olvera; Juan Celaya	Mexico	Anthony Harding; Jack Laugher	Great Britain	
Equestrian	Team jumping	Scott Brash; Harry Charles; Ben Maher	Great Britain		Karl Cook; Laura Kraut; McLain Ward	United States	Simon Delestre; Julien Epaillard; Olivier Perreau	France	
Fencing	Men's team épée	Tibor Andrásfi; Máté Tamás Koch; Gergely Siklósi; Dávid Nagy	Hungary		Koki Kano; Kazuyasu Minobe; Masaru Yamada	Japan	Jiří Beran; Jakub Jurka; Martin Rubeš; Michal Čupr	Czech Republic	
Gymnastics	Men's trampoline	Ivan Litvinovich	Individual Neutral Athletes		Wang Zisai	China	Yan Langyu	China	
Gymnastics	Women's trampoline	Bryony Page	Great Britain		Viyaleta Bardzilouskaya	Individual Neutral Athletes	Sophiane Méthot	Canada	
Judo	Men's +100 kg	Teddy Riner	France		Kim Min-jong	South Korea	Temur Rakhimov	Tajikistan	
Judo	Men's +100 kg	Teddy Riner	France		Kim Min-jong	South Korea	Alisher Yusupov	Uzbekistan	
Judo	Women's +78 kg	Beatriz Souza	Brazil		Raz Hershko	Israel	Kim Ha-yun	South Korea	
Judo	Women's +78 kg	Beatriz Souza	Brazil		Raz Hershko	Israel	Romane Dicko	France	
Rowing	Men's coxless pair	Martin Sinković; Valent Sinković	Croatia		Oliver Wynne-Griffith; Thomas George	Great Britain	Roman Röösli; Andrin Gulich	Switzerland	
Rowing	Men's lightweight double sculls	Fintan McCarthy; Paul O'Donovan	Ireland		Stefano Oppo; Gabriel Soares	Italy	Petros Gkaidatzis; Antonios Papakonstantinou	Greece	
Rowing	Women's coxless pair	Ymkje Clevering; Veronique Meester	Netherlands		Ioana Vrînceanu; Roxana Anghel	Romania	Jessica Morrison; Annabelle McIntyre	Australia	
Rowing	Women's lightweight double sculls	Emily Craig; Imogen Grant	Great Britain		Gianina Beleagă; Ionela Cozmiuc	Romania	Dimitra Kontou; Zoi Fitsiou	Greece	
Sailing	49er	Diego Botín; Florián Trittel	Spain		Isaac McHardie; William McKenzie	New Zealand	Ian Barrows; Hans Henken	United States	
Sailing	49er FX	Odile van Aanholt; Annette Duetz	Netherlands		Vilma Bobeck; Rebecca Netzler	Sweden	Sarah Steyaert; Charline Picon	France	
Shooting	Women's 50 m rifle 3 positions	Chiara Leone	Switzerland		Sagen Maddalena	United States	Zhang Qiongyue	China	
Swimming	Men's 50 m freestyle	Cameron McEvoy	Australia		Ben Proud	Great Britain	Florent Manaudou	France	
Swimming	Men's 200 m individual medley	Léon Marchand	France	OR	Duncan Scott	Great Britain	Wang Shun	China	
Swimming	Women's 200 m backstroke	Kaylee McKeown	Australia		Regan Smith	United States	Kylie Masse	Canada	
Tennis	Mixed doubles	Kateřina Siniaková; Tomáš Macháč	Czech Republic		Wang Xinyu; Zhang Zhizhen	China	Gabriela Dabrowski; Félix Auger-Aliassime	Canada	

=== Day 8: 3 August ===
Sport	Event	Gold medalist(s)			Silver medalist(s)		Bronze medalist(s)		Ref
Sport	Event	Competitor(s)	Team	Rec	Competitor(s)	Team	Competitor(s)	Team	Ref
Archery	Women's individual	Lim Si-hyeon	South Korea		Nam Su-hyeon	South Korea	Lisa Barbelin	France	
Athletics	Men's decathlon	Markus Rooth	Norway		Leo Neugebauer	Germany	Lindon Victor	Grenada	
Athletics	Men's shot put	Ryan Crouser	United States		Joe Kovacs	United States	Rajindra Campbell	Jamaica	
Athletics	Mixed 4 × 400 m relay	Eugene Omalla; Lieke Klaver; Isaya Klein Ikkink; Femke Bol	Netherlands		Vernon Norwood; Shamier Little; Bryce Deadmon; Kaylyn Brown	United States	Samuel Reardon; Laviai Nielsen; Alex Haydock-Wilson; Amber Anning	Great Britain	
Athletics	Women's 100 m	Julien Alfred	Saint Lucia		Sha'Carri Richardson	United States	Melissa Jefferson	United States	
Athletics	Women's triple jump	Thea LaFond	Dominica		Shanieka Ricketts	Jamaica	Jasmine Moore	United States	
Badminton	Women's doubles	Chen Qingchen; Jia Yifan	China		Liu Shengshu; Tan Ning	China	Nami Matsuyama; Chiharu Shida	Japan	
Cycling	Men's road race	Remco Evenepoel	Belgium		Valentin Madouas	France	Christophe Laporte	France	
Equestrian	Team dressage	Jessica von Bredow-Werndl; Frederic Wandres; Isabell Werth	Germany		Daniel Bachmann Andersen; Cathrine Laudrup-Dufour; Nanna Merrald Rasmussen	Denmark	Charlotte Fry; Carl Hester; Becky Moody	Great Britain	
Fencing	Women's team sabre	Yuliya Bakastova; Alina Komashchuk; Olga Kharlan; Olena Kravatska	Ukraine		Choi Se-bin; Jeon Ha-young; Jeon Eun-hye; Yoon Ji-su	South Korea	Risa Takashima; Seri Ozaki; Misaki Emura; Shihomi Fukushima	Japan	
Gymnastics	Men's floor	Carlos Yulo	Philippines		Artem Dolgopyat	Israel	Jake Jarman	Great Britain	
Gymnastics	Men's pommel horse	Rhys McClenaghan	Ireland		Nariman Kurbanov	Kazakhstan	Stephen Nedoroscik	United States	
Gymnastics	Women's vault	Simone Biles	United States		Rebeca Andrade	Brazil	Jade Carey	United States	
Judo	Mixed team	Shirine Boukli; Joan-Benjamin Gaba; Amandine Buchard; Walide Khyar; Sarah-Léonie Cysique; Luka Mkheidze; Clarisse Agbegnenou; Alpha Oumar Djalo; Marie-Ève Gahié; Maxime-Gaël Ngayap Hambou; Romane Dicko; Aurélien Diesse; Madeleine Malonga; Teddy Riner	France		Uta Abe; Hifumi Abe; Haruka Funakubo; Soichi Hashimoto; Natsumi Tsunoda; Ryuju Nagayama; Saki Niizoe; Sanshiro Murao; Miku Tashiro; Takanori Nagase; Akira Sone; Tatsuru Saito; Rika Takayama; Aaron Wolf	Japan	Larissa Pimenta; Daniel Cargnin; Rafaela Silva; Willian Lima; Ketleyn Quadros; Rafael Macedo; Beatriz Souza; Guilherme Schimidt; Leonardo Gonçalves; Rafael Silva	Brazil	
Judo	Mixed team	Shirine Boukli; Joan-Benjamin Gaba; Amandine Buchard; Walide Khyar; Sarah-Léonie Cysique; Luka Mkheidze; Clarisse Agbegnenou; Alpha Oumar Djalo; Marie-Ève Gahié; Maxime-Gaël Ngayap Hambou; Romane Dicko; Aurélien Diesse; Madeleine Malonga; Teddy Riner	France		Uta Abe; Hifumi Abe; Haruka Funakubo; Soichi Hashimoto; Natsumi Tsunoda; Ryuju Nagayama; Saki Niizoe; Sanshiro Murao; Miku Tashiro; Takanori Nagase; Akira Sone; Tatsuru Saito; Rika Takayama; Aaron Wolf	Japan	Huh Mi-mi; An Ba-ul; Jung Ye-rin; Kim Won-jin; Lee Hye-kyeong; Han Ju-yeop; Kim Ji-su; Lee Joon-hwan; Kim Ha-yun; Kim Min-jong; Yoon Hyun-ji	South Korea	
Rowing	Men's single sculls	Oliver Zeidler	Germany		Yauheni Zalaty	Individual Neutral Athletes	Simon van Dorp	Netherlands	
Rowing	Men's eight	Sholto Carnegie; Rory Gibbs; Morgan Bolding; Jacob Dawson; Charles Elwes; Thomas Digby; James Rudkin; Thomas Ford; Harry Brightmore	Great Britain		Ralf Rienks; Olav Molenaar; Sander de Graaf; Ruben Knab; Gertjan van Doorn; Jacob van de Kerkhof; Jan van der Bij; Mick Makker; Dieuwke Fetter	Netherlands	Henry Hollingsworth; Nicholas Rusher; Christian Tabash; Clark Dean; Christopher Carlson; Peter Chatain; Evan Olson; Pieter Quinton; Rielly Milne	United States	
Rowing	Women's single sculls	Karolien Florijn	Netherlands		Emma Twigg	New Zealand	Viktorija Senkutė	Lithuania	
Rowing	Women's eight	Maria-Magdalena Rusu; Roxana Anghel; Ancuța Bodnar; Maria Tivodariu; Adriana Adam; Amalia Bereș; Ioana Vrînceanu; Simona Radiș; Victoria-Ștefania Petreanu	Romania		Jessica Sevick; Caileigh Filmer; Maya Meschkuleit; Kasia Gruchalla-Wesierski; Avalon Wasteneys; Sydney Payne; Kristina Walker; Abigail Dent; Kristen Kit	Canada	Heidi Long; Rowan McKellar; Holly Dunford; Emily Ford; Lauren Irwin; Eve Stewart; Harriet Taylor; Annie Campbell-Orde; Henry Fieldman	Great Britain	
Sailing	Men's IQFoil	Tom Reuveny	Israel		Grae Morris	Australia	Luuc van Opzeeland	Netherlands	
Sailing	Women's IQFoil	Marta Maggetti	Italy		Sharon Kantor	Israel	Emma Wilson	Great Britain	
Shooting	Men's skeet	Vincent Hancock	United States		Conner Prince	United States	Lee Meng-yuan	Chinese Taipei	
Shooting	Women's 25 m pistol	Yang Ji-in	South Korea		Camille Jedrzejewski	France	Veronika Major	Hungary	
Swimming	Men's 100 m butterfly	Kristóf Milák	Hungary		Joshua Liendo	Canada	Ilya Kharun	Canada	
Swimming	Mixed 4 × 100 m medley relay	Ryan Murphy; Nic Fink; Gretchen Walsh; Torri Huske	United States	WR	Xu Jiayu; Qin Haiyang; Zhang Yufei; Yang Junxuan	China	Kaylee McKeown; Joshua Yong; Matthew Temple; Mollie O'Callaghan	Australia	
Swimming	Women's 200 m individual medley	Summer McIntosh	Canada		Kate Douglass	United States	Kaylee McKeown	Australia	
Swimming	Women's 800 m freestyle	Katie Ledecky	United States		Ariarne Titmus	Australia	Paige Madden	United States	
Table tennis	Women's singles	Chen Meng	China		Sun Yingsha	China	Hina Hayata	Japan	
Tennis	Men's doubles	Matthew Ebden; John Peers	Australia		Austin Krajicek; Rajeev Ram	United States	Taylor Fritz; Tommy Paul	United States	
Tennis	Women's singles (Note: Bronze medalist(s) determined on the previous day.)	Zheng Qinwen	China		Donna Vekić	Croatia	Iga Świątek	Poland	

=== Day 9: 4 August ===
Sport	Event	Gold medalist(s)			Silver medalist(s)		Bronze medalist(s)		Ref
Sport	Event	Competitor(s)	Team	Rec	Competitor(s)	Team	Competitor(s)	Team	Ref
Archery	Men's individual	Kim Woo-jin	South Korea		Brady Ellison	United States	Lee Woo-seok	South Korea	
Athletics	Men's 100 m	Noah Lyles	United States		Kishane Thompson	Jamaica	Fred Kerley	United States	
Athletics	Men's hammer throw	Ethan Katzberg	Canada		Bence Halász	Hungary	Mykhaylo Kokhan	Ukraine	
Athletics	Women's high jump	Yaroslava Mahuchikh	Ukraine		Nicola Olyslagers	Australia	Eleanor Patterson	Australia	
Athletics	Women's high jump	Yaroslava Mahuchikh	Ukraine		Nicola Olyslagers	Australia	Iryna Herashchenko	Ukraine	
Badminton	Men's doubles	Lee Yang; Wang Chi-lin	Chinese Taipei		Liang Weikeng; Wang Chang	China	Aaron Chia; Soh Wooi Yik	Malaysia	
Cycling	Women's road race	Kristen Faulkner	United States		Marianne Vos	Netherlands	Lotte Kopecky	Belgium	
Equestrian	Individual dressage	Jessica von Bredow-Werndl	Germany		Isabell Werth	Germany	Charlotte Fry	Great Britain	
Fencing	Men's team foil	Kazuki Iimura; Kyosuke Matsuyama; Yudai Nagano; Takahiro Shikine	Japan		Guillaume Bianchi; Alessio Foconi; Tommaso Marini; Filippo Macchi	Italy	Maximilien Chastanet; Maxime Pauty; Enzo Lefort; Julien Mertine	France	
Golf	Men's	Scottie Scheffler	United States		Tommy Fleetwood	Great Britain	Hideki Matsuyama	Japan	
Gymnastics	Men's rings	Liu Yang	China		Zou Jingyuan	China	Eleftherios Petrounias	Greece	
Gymnastics	Men's vault	Carlos Yulo	Philippines		Artur Davtyan	Armenia	Harry Hepworth	Great Britain	
Gymnastics	Women's uneven bars	Kaylia Nemour	Algeria		Qiu Qiyuan	China	Sunisa Lee	United States	
Shooting	Women's skeet	Francisca Crovetto	Chile		Amber Rutter	Great Britain	Austen Smith	United States	
Swimming	Men's 1500 m freestyle	Bobby Finke	United States	WR	Gregorio Paltrinieri	Italy	Daniel Wiffen	Ireland	
Swimming	Women's 50 m freestyle	Sarah Sjöström	Sweden		Meg Harris	Australia	Zhang Yufei	China	
Swimming	Men's 4 × 100 m medley relay	Xu Jiayu; Qin Haiyang; Sun Jiajun; Pan Zhanle	China		Ryan Murphy; Nic Fink; Caeleb Dressel; Hunter Armstrong	United States	Yohann Ndoye-Brouard; Léon Marchand; Maxime Grousset; Florent Manaudou	France	
Swimming	Women's 4 × 100 m medley relay	Regan Smith; Lilly King; Gretchen Walsh; Torri Huske	United States	WR	Kaylee McKeown; Jenna Strauch; Emma McKeon; Mollie O'Callaghan	Australia	Wan Letian; Tang Qianting; Zhang Yufei; Yang Junxuan	China	
Table tennis	Men's singles	Fan Zhendong	China		Truls Möregårdh	Sweden	Félix Lebrun	France	
Tennis	Men's singles	Novak Djokovic	Serbia		Carlos Alcaraz	Spain	Lorenzo Musetti	Italy	
Tennis	Women's doubles	Sara Errani; Jasmine Paolini	Italy		Mirra Andreeva; Diana Shnaider	Individual Neutral Athletes	Cristina Bucșa; Sara Sorribes Tormo	Spain	

=== Day 10: 5 August ===
Sport	Event	Gold medalist(s)			Silver medalist(s)		Bronze medalist(s)		Ref
Sport	Event	Competitor(s)	Team	Rec	Competitor(s)	Team	Competitor(s)	Team	Ref
Athletics	Men's pole vault	Armand Duplantis	Sweden	WR	Sam Kendricks	United States	Emmanouil Karalis	Greece	
Athletics	Women's 800 m	Keely Hodgkinson	Great Britain		Tsige Duguma	Ethiopia	Mary Moraa	Kenya	
Athletics	Women's 5000 m	Beatrice Chebet	Kenya		Faith Kipyegon	Kenya	Sifan Hassan	Netherlands	
Athletics	Women's discus throw	Valarie Allman	United States		Feng Bin	China	Sandra Elkasević	Croatia	
Badminton	Men's singles	Viktor Axelsen	Denmark		Kunlavut Vitidsarn	Thailand	Lee Zii Jia	Malaysia	
Badminton	Women's singles	An Se-young	South Korea		He Bingjiao	China	Gregoria Mariska Tunjung	Indonesia	
Basketball	Men's 3x3	Worthy de Jong; Jan Driessen; Arvin Slagter; Dimeo van der Horst	Netherlands		Lucas Dussoulier; Jules Rambaut; Franck Seguela; Timothé Vergiat	France	Evaldas Džiaugys; Gintautas Matulis; Aurelijus Pukelis; Šarūnas Vingelis	Lithuania	
Basketball	Women's 3x3	Svenja Brunckhorst; Sonja Greinacher; Elisa Mevius; Marie Reichert	Germany		Gracia Alonso de Armiño; Juana Camilión; Vega Gimeno; Sandra Ygueravide	Spain	Cierra Burdick; Dearica Hamby; Rhyne Howard; Hailey Van Lith	United States	
Canoeing	Men's KX-1	Finn Butcher	New Zealand		Joe Clarke	Great Britain	Noah Hegge	Germany	
Canoeing	Women's KX-1	Noemie Fox	Australia		Angèle Hug	France	Kimberley Woods	Great Britain	
Cycling	Women's team sprint	Katy Marchant; Sophie Capewell; Emma Finucane	Great Britain	WR	Rebecca Petch; Shaane Fulton; Ellesse Andrews	New Zealand	Pauline Grabosch; Emma Hinze; Lea Sophie Friedrich	Germany	
Gymnastics	Men's horizontal bar	Shinnosuke Oka	Japan		Ángel Barajas	Colombia	Tang Chia-hung	Chinese Taipei	
Gymnastics	Men's horizontal bar	Shinnosuke Oka	Japan		Ángel Barajas	Colombia	Zhang Boheng	China	
Gymnastics	Men's parallel bars	Zou Jingyuan	China		Illia Kovtun	Ukraine	Shinnosuke Oka	Japan	
Gymnastics	Women's balance beam	Alice D'Amato	Italy		Zhou Yaqin	China	Manila Esposito	Italy	
Gymnastics	Women's floor	Rebeca Andrade	Brazil		Simone Biles	United States	Ana Bărbosu	Romania	
Shooting	Men's 25 m rapid fire pistol	Li Yuehong	China		Cho Yeong-jae	South Korea	Wang Xinjie	China	
Shooting	Mixed skeet team	Diana Bacosi; Gabriele Rossetti	Italy		Austen Smith; Vincent Hancock	United States	Jiang Yiting; Lyu Jianlin	China	
Surfing	Men's shortboard	Kauli Vaast	France		Jack Robinson	Australia	Gabriel Medina	Brazil	
Surfing	Women's shortboard	Caroline Marks	United States		Tatiana Weston-Webb	Brazil	Johanne Defay	France	
Triathlon	Mixed relay	Tim Hellwig; Lisa Tertsch; Lasse Lührs; Laura Lindemann	Germany		Seth Rider; Taylor Spivey; Morgan Pearson; Taylor Knibb	United States	Alex Yee; Georgia Taylor-Brown; Sam Dickinson; Beth Potter	Great Britain	

=== Day 11: 6 August ===
Sport	Event	Gold medalist(s)			Silver medalist(s)		Bronze medalist(s)		Ref
Sport	Event	Competitor(s)	Team	Rec	Competitor(s)	Team	Competitor(s)	Team	Ref
Athletics	Men's 1500 m	Cole Hocker	United States	OR	Josh Kerr	Great Britain	Yared Nuguse	United States	
Athletics	Men's long jump	Miltiadis Tentoglou	Greece		Wayne Pinnock	Jamaica	Mattia Furlani	Italy	
Athletics	Women's 200 m	Gabrielle Thomas	United States		Julien Alfred	Saint Lucia	Brittany Brown	United States	
Athletics	Women's 3000 m steeplechase	Winfred Yavi	Bahrain		Peruth Chemutai	Uganda	Faith Cherotich	Kenya	
Athletics	Women's hammer throw	Camryn Rogers	Canada		Annette Echikunwoke	United States	Zhao Jie	China	
Boxing	Women's 60 kg (Note: Bronze medalist(s) determined a few days earlier. (Women's 60kg on August 3 and Men's 51kg/63.5kg/80kg/92kg / Women's 54kg on August 4))	Kellie Harrington	Ireland		Yang Wenlu	China	Wu Shih-yi	Chinese Taipei	
Boxing	Women's 60 kg	Kellie Harrington	Ireland		Yang Wenlu	China	Beatriz Ferreira	Brazil	
Cycling	Men's team sprint	Roy van den Berg; Harrie Lavreysen; Jeffrey Hoogland	Netherlands	WR	Ed Lowe; Hamish Turnbull; Jack Carlin	Great Britain	Leigh Hoffman; Matthew Richardson; Matthew Glaetzer	Australia	
Diving	Women's 10 m platform	Quan Hongchan	China		Chen Yuxi	China	Kim Mi-rae	North Korea	
Equestrian	Individual jumping	Christian Kukuk	Germany		Steve Guerdat	Switzerland	Maikel van der Vleuten	Netherlands	
Skateboarding	Women's park	Arisa Trew	Australia		Kokona Hiraki	Japan	Sky Brown	Great Britain	
Wrestling	Men's Greco-Roman 60 kg	Kenichiro Fumita	Japan		Cao Liguo	China	Ri Se-ung	North Korea	
Wrestling	Men's Greco-Roman 60 kg	Kenichiro Fumita	Japan		Cao Liguo	China	Zholaman Sharshenbekov	Kyrgyzstan	
Wrestling	Men's Greco-Roman 130 kg	Mijaín López	Cuba		Yasmani Acosta	Chile	Meng Lingzhe	China	
Wrestling	Men's Greco-Roman 130 kg	Mijaín López	Cuba		Yasmani Acosta	Chile	Amin Mirzazadeh	Iran	
Wrestling	Women's freestyle 68 kg	Amit Elor	United States		Meerim Zhumanazarova	Kyrgyzstan	Nonoka Ozaki	Japan	
Wrestling	Women's freestyle 68 kg	Amit Elor	United States		Meerim Zhumanazarova	Kyrgyzstan	Buse Tosun Çavuşoğlu	Turkey	

=== Day 12: 7 August ===
Sport	Event	Gold medalist(s)			Silver medalist(s)		Bronze medalist(s)		Ref
Sport	Event	Competitor(s)	Team	Rec	Competitor(s)	Team	Competitor(s)	Team	Ref
Artistic swimming	Team	Chang Hao; Feng Yu; Wang Ciyue; Wang Liuyi; Wang Qianyi; Xiang Binxuan; Xiao Yanning; Zhang Yayi	China		Anita Alvarez; Jaime Czarkowski; Megumi Field; Keana Hunter; Audrey Kwon; Jacklyn Luu; Daniella Ramirez; Ruby Remati	United States	Txell Ferré; Marina García Polo; Lilou Lluís Valette; Meritxell Mas; Alisa Ozhogina; Paula Ramírez; Iris Tió; Blanca Toledano	Spain	
Athletics	Men's 400 m	Quincy Hall	United States		Matthew Hudson-Smith	Great Britain	Muzala Samukonga	Zambia	
Athletics	Men's 3000 m steeplechase	Soufiane El Bakkali	Morocco		Kenneth Rooks	United States	Abraham Kibiwot	Kenya	
Athletics	Men's discus throw	Rojé Stona	Jamaica	OR	Mykolas Alekna	Lithuania	Matthew Denny	Australia	
Athletics	Mixed marathon walk relay	Álvaro Martín; María Pérez	Spain		Brian Pintado; Glenda Morejón	Ecuador	Rhydian Cowley; Jemima Montag	Australia	
Athletics	Women's pole vault	Nina Kennedy	Australia		Katie Moon	United States	Alysha Newman	Canada	
Boxing	Men's 80 kg	Oleksandr Khyzhniak	Ukraine		Nurbek Oralbay	Kazakhstan	Cristian Pinales	Dominican Republic	
Boxing	Men's 80 kg	Oleksandr Khyzhniak	Ukraine		Nurbek Oralbay	Kazakhstan	Arlen López	Cuba	
Boxing	Men's 63.5 kg	Erislandy Álvarez	Cuba		Sofiane Oumiha	France	Wyatt Sanford	Canada	
Boxing	Men's 63.5 kg	Erislandy Álvarez	Cuba		Sofiane Oumiha	France	Lasha Guruli	Georgia	
Cycling	Men's team pursuit	Oliver Bleddyn; Conor Leahy; Kelland O'Brien; Sam Welsford	Australia		Daniel Bigham; Ethan Hayter; Charlie Tanfield; Ethan Vernon; Oliver Wood	Great Britain	Simone Consonni; Filippo Ganna; Francesco Lamon; Jonathan Milan	Italy	
Cycling	Women's team pursuit	Chloé Dygert; Kristen Faulkner; Jennifer Valente; Lily Williams	United States		Bryony Botha; Emily Shearman; Nicole Shields; Ally Wollaston	New Zealand	Elinor Barker; Josie Knight; Anna Morris; Jessica Roberts	Great Britain	
Sailing	ILCA 6	Marit Bouwmeester	Netherlands		Anne-Marie Rindom	Denmark	Line Flem Høst	Norway	
Sailing	ILCA 7	Matthew Wearn	Australia		Pavlos Kontides	Cyprus	Stefano Peschiera	Peru	
Skateboarding	Men's park	Keegan Palmer	Australia		Tom Schaar	United States	Augusto Akio	Brazil	
Sport climbing	Women's speed	Aleksandra Mirosław	Poland		Deng Lijuan	China	Aleksandra Kałucka	Poland	
Taekwondo	Men's 58 kg	Park Tae-joon	South Korea		Gashim Magomedov	Azerbaijan	Mohamed Khalil Jendoubi	Tunisia	
Taekwondo	Men's 58 kg	Park Tae-joon	South Korea		Gashim Magomedov	Azerbaijan	Cyrian Ravet	France	
Taekwondo	Women's 49 kg	Panipak Wongpattanakit	Thailand		Guo Qing	China	Lena Stojković	Croatia	
Taekwondo	Women's 49 kg	Panipak Wongpattanakit	Thailand		Guo Qing	China	Mobina Nematzadeh	Iran	
Weightlifting	Men's 61 kg	Li Fabin	China		Theerapong Silachai	Thailand	Hampton Morris	United States	
Weightlifting	Women's 49 kg	Hou Zhihui	China		Mihaela Cambei	Romania	Surodchana Khambao	Thailand	
Wrestling	Men's Greco-Roman 77 kg	Nao Kusaka	Japan		Demeu Zhadrayev	Kazakhstan	Malkhas Amoyan	Armenia	
Wrestling	Men's Greco-Roman 77 kg	Nao Kusaka	Japan		Demeu Zhadrayev	Kazakhstan	Akzhol Makhmudov	Kyrgyzstan	
Wrestling	Men's Greco-Roman 97 kg	Mohammad Hadi Saravi	Iran		Artur Aleksanyan	Armenia	Gabriel Rosillo	Cuba	
Wrestling	Men's Greco-Roman 97 kg	Mohammad Hadi Saravi	Iran		Artur Aleksanyan	Armenia	Uzur Dzhuzupbekov	Kyrgyzstan	
Wrestling	Women's freestyle 50 kg	Sarah Hildebrandt	United States		Yusneylys Guzmán	Cuba	Yui Susaki	Japan	
Wrestling	Women's freestyle 50 kg	Sarah Hildebrandt	United States		Yusneylys Guzmán	Cuba	Feng Ziqi	China	

=== Day 13: 8 August ===
Sport	Event	Gold medalist(s)			Silver medalist(s)		Bronze medalist(s)		Ref
Sport	Event	Competitor(s)	Team	Rec	Competitor(s)	Team	Competitor(s)	Team	Ref
Athletics	Men's 110 m hurdles	Grant Holloway	United States		Daniel Roberts	United States	Rasheed Broadbell	Jamaica	
Athletics	Men's 200 m	Letsile Tebogo	Botswana		Kenny Bednarek	United States	Noah Lyles	United States	
Athletics	Men's javelin throw	Arshad Nadeem	Pakistan	OR	Neeraj Chopra	India	Anderson Peters	Grenada	
Athletics	Women's 400 m hurdles	Sydney McLaughlin-Levrone	United States	WR	Anna Cockrell	United States	Femke Bol	Netherlands	
Athletics	Women's long jump	Tara Davis-Woodhall	United States		Malaika Mihambo	Germany	Jasmine Moore	United States	
Boxing	Men's 51 kg	Hasanboy Dusmatov	Uzbekistan		Billal Bennama	France	Junior Alcántara	Dominican Republic	
Boxing	Men's 51 kg	Hasanboy Dusmatov	Uzbekistan		Billal Bennama	France	Daniel Varela de Pina	Cape Verde	
Boxing	Women's 54 kg	Chang Yuan	China		Hatice Akbaş	Turkey	Pang Chol-mi	North Korea	
Boxing	Women's 54 kg	Chang Yuan	China		Hatice Akbaş	Turkey	Im Ae-ji	South Korea	
Canoeing	Men's C-2 500 m	Liu Hao; Ji Bowen	China		Gabriele Casadei; Carlo Tacchini	Italy	Joan Antoni Moreno; Diego Domínguez	Spain	
Canoeing	Men's K-4 500 m	Max Rendschmidt; Max Lemke; Jacob Schopf; Tom Liebscher	Germany		Riley Fitzsimmons; Pierre van der Westhuyzen; Jackson Collins; Noah Havard	Australia	Saúl Craviotto; Carlos Arévalo; Marcus Cooper Walz; Rodrigo Germade	Spain	
Canoeing	Women's K-4 500 m	Lisa Carrington; Alicia Hoskin; Olivia Brett; Tara Vaughan	New Zealand		Paulina Paszek; Jule Hake; Pauline Jagsch; Sarah Brüßler	Germany	Noémi Pupp; Sára Fojt; Tamara Csipes; Alida Dóra Gazsó	Hungary	
Cycling	Men's omnium	Benjamin Thomas	France		Iúri Leitão	Portugal	Fabio Van den Bossche	Belgium	
Cycling	Women's keirin	Ellesse Andrews	New Zealand		Hetty van de Wouw	Netherlands	Emma Finucane	Great Britain	
Diving	Men's 3 m springboard	Xie Siyi	China		Wang Zongyuan	China	Osmar Olvera	Mexico	
Field hockey	Men's	Jip Janssen; Lars Balk; Jonas de Geus; Thijs van Dam; Thierry Brinkman; Seve van Ass; Jorrit Croon; Justen Blok; Derck de Vilder; Floris Wortelboer; Tjep Hoedemakers; Koen Bijen; Joep de Mol; Pirmin Blaak; Tijmen Reyenga; Duco Telgenkamp; Floris Middendorp	Netherlands		Mathias Müller; Mats Grambusch; Lukas Windfeder; Niklas Wellen; Johannes Große; Thies Prinz; Paul-Philipp Kaufmann; Teo Hinrichs; Tom Grambusch; Gonzalo Peillat; Christopher Rühr; Justus Weigand; Marco Miltkau; Martin Zwicker; Hannes Müller; Malte Hellwig; Moritz Ludwig; Jean Danneberg	Germany	Jarmanpreet Singh; Abhishek Nain; Manpreet Singh; Hardik Singh; Sanjay; Mandeep Singh; Harmanpreet Singh; Lalit Upadhyay; P. R. Sreejesh; Sumit Walmiki; Shamsher Singh; Raj Kumar Pal; Amit Rohidas; Vivek Prasad; Sukhjeet Singh	India	
Sailing	470	Lara Vadlau; Lukas Mähr	Austria		Keiju Okada; Miho Yoshioka	Japan	Anton Dahlberg; Lovisa Karlsson	Sweden	
Sailing	Nacra 17	Ruggero Tita; Caterina Banti	Italy		Mateo Majdalani; Eugenia Bosco	Argentina	Micah Wilkinson; Erica Dawson	New Zealand	
Sailing	Women's Formula Kite	Ellie Aldridge	Great Britain		Lauriane Nolot	France	Annelous Lammerts	Netherlands	
Sport climbing	Men's speed	Veddriq Leonardo	Indonesia		Wu Peng	China	Sam Watson	United States	
Swimming	Women's marathon 10 km	Sharon van Rouwendaal	Netherlands		Moesha Johnson	Australia	Ginevra Taddeucci	Italy	
Taekwondo	Men's 68 kg	Ulugbek Rashitov	Uzbekistan		Zaid Kareem	Jordan	Liang Yushuai	China	
Taekwondo	Men's 68 kg	Ulugbek Rashitov	Uzbekistan		Zaid Kareem	Jordan	Edival Pontes	Brazil	
Taekwondo	Women's 57 kg	Kim Yu-jin	South Korea		Nahid Kiani	Iran	Kimia Alizadeh	Bulgaria	
Taekwondo	Women's 57 kg	Kim Yu-jin	South Korea		Nahid Kiani	Iran	Skylar Park	Canada	
Weightlifting	Men's 73 kg	Rizki Juniansyah	Indonesia	OR	Weeraphon Wichuma	Thailand	Bozhidar Andreev	Bulgaria	
Weightlifting	Women's 59 kg	Luo Shifang	China	OR	Maude Charron	Canada	Kuo Hsing-chun	Chinese Taipei	
Wrestling	Men's Greco-Roman 67 kg	Saeid Esmaeili	Iran		Parviz Nasibov	Ukraine	Hasrat Jafarov	Azerbaijan	
Wrestling	Men's Greco-Roman 67 kg	Saeid Esmaeili	Iran		Parviz Nasibov	Ukraine	Luis Orta	Cuba	
Wrestling	Men's Greco-Roman 87 kg	Semen Novikov	Bulgaria		Alireza Mohmadi	Iran	Zhan Beleniuk	Ukraine	
Wrestling	Men's Greco-Roman 87 kg	Semen Novikov	Bulgaria		Alireza Mohmadi	Iran	Turpal Bisultanov	Denmark	
Wrestling	Women's freestyle 53 kg	Akari Fujinami	Japan		Lucía Yépez	Ecuador	Choe Hyo-gyong	North Korea	
Wrestling	Women's freestyle 53 kg	Akari Fujinami	Japan		Lucía Yépez	Ecuador	Pang Qianyu	China	

=== Day 14: 9 August ===
Sport	Event	Gold medalist(s)			Silver medalist(s)		Bronze medalist(s)		Ref
Sport	Event	Competitor(s)	Team	Rec	Competitor(s)	Team	Competitor(s)	Team	Ref
Athletics	Men's 400 m hurdles	Rai Benjamin	United States		Karsten Warholm	Norway	Alison dos Santos	Brazil	
Athletics	Men's 4 × 100 m relay	Aaron Brown; Jerome Blake; Brendon Rodney; Andre De Grasse	Canada		Bayanda Walaza; Shaun Maswanganyi; Bradley Nkoana; Akani Simbine	South Africa	Jeremiah Azu; Louie Hinchliffe; Nethaneel Mitchell-Blake; Zharnel Hughes; Richard Kilty	Great Britain	
Athletics	Men's triple jump	Jordan Díaz	Spain		Pedro Pichardo	Portugal	Andy Díaz	Italy	
Athletics	Women's 400 m	Marileidy Paulino	Dominican Republic	OR	Salwa Eid Naser	Bahrain	Natalia Kaczmarek	Poland	
Athletics	Women's 10,000 m	Beatrice Chebet	Kenya		Nadia Battocletti	Italy	Sifan Hassan	Netherlands	
Athletics	Women's 4 × 100 m relay	Melissa Jefferson; Twanisha Terry; Gabrielle Thomas; Sha'Carri Richardson	United States		Dina Asher-Smith; Imani-Lara Lansiquot; Amy Hunt; Daryll Neita; Desirèe Henry; Bianca Williams	Great Britain	Alexandra Burghardt; Lisa Mayer; Gina Lückenkemper; Rebekka Haase; Sophia Junk	Germany	
Athletics	Women's heptathlon	Nafissatou Thiam	Belgium		Katarina Johnson-Thompson	Great Britain	Noor Vidts	Belgium	
Athletics	Women's shot put	Yemisi Ogunleye	Germany		Maddi Wesche	New Zealand	Song Jiayuan	China	
Boxing	Men's 71 kg (Note: Bronze medalist(s) determined a few days earlier. (Men's 71kg / Women's 50kg/66kg on August 6, Men's +92kg / Women's 57kg on August 7 and Men's 57 kg / Women's 75kg on August 8))	Asadkhuja Muydinkhujaev	Uzbekistan		Marco Verde	Mexico	Omari Jones	United States	
Boxing	Men's 71 kg	Asadkhuja Muydinkhujaev	Uzbekistan		Marco Verde	Mexico	Lewis Richardson	Great Britain	
Boxing	Men's 92kg	Lazizbek Mullojonov	Uzbekistan		Loren Alfonso	Azerbaijan	Enmanuel Reyes	Spain	
Boxing	Men's 92kg	Lazizbek Mullojonov	Uzbekistan		Loren Alfonso	Azerbaijan	Davlat Boltaev	Tajikistan	
Boxing	Women's 50 kg	Wu Yu	China		Buse Naz Çakıroğlu	Turkey	Nazym Kyzaibay	Kazakhstan	
Boxing	Women's 50 kg	Wu Yu	China		Buse Naz Çakıroğlu	Turkey	Aira Villegas	Philippines	
Boxing	Women's 66 kg	Imane Khelif	Algeria		Yang Liu	China	Janjaem Suwannapheng	Thailand	
Boxing	Women's 66 kg	Imane Khelif	Algeria		Yang Liu	China	Chen Nien-chin	Chinese Taipei	
Breaking	B-Girls	Ami Yuasa	Japan		Dominika Banevič	Lithuania	Liu Qingyi	China	
Canoeing	Men's C-1 1000 m	Martin Fuksa	Czech Republic		Isaquias Queiroz	Brazil	Serghei Tarnovschi	Moldova	
Canoeing	Men's K-2 500 m	Jacob Schopf; Max Lemke	Germany		Bence Nádas; Sándor Tótka	Hungary	Jean van der Westhuyzen; Thomas Green	Australia	
Canoeing	Women's C-2 500 m	Xu Shixiao; Sun Mengya	China		Liudmyla Luzan; Anastasiia Rybachok	Ukraine	Sloan MacKenzie; Katie Vincent	Canada	
Canoeing	Women's K-2 500 m	Lisa Carrington; Alicia Hoskin	New Zealand		Tamara Csipes; Alida Dóra Gazsó	Hungary	Paulina Paszek; Jule Hake	Germany	
Canoeing	Women's K-2 500 m	Lisa Carrington; Alicia Hoskin	New Zealand		Tamara Csipes; Alida Dóra Gazsó	Hungary	Noémi Pupp; Sára Fojt	Hungary	
Cycling	Men's sprint	Harrie Lavreysen	Netherlands		Matthew Richardson	Australia	Jack Carlin	Great Britain	
Cycling	Women's madison	Chiara Consonni; Vittoria Guazzini	Italy		Elinor Barker; Neah Evans	Great Britain	Lisa van Belle; Maike van der Duin	Netherlands	
Diving	Women's 3 m springboard	Chen Yiwen	China		Maddison Keeney	Australia	Chang Yani	China	
Field hockey	Women's	Anne Veenendaal; Luna Fokke; Freeke Moes; Lisa Post; Xan de Waard; Yibbi Jansen; Renée van Laarhoven; Felice Albers; Maria Verschoor; Sanne Koolen; Frédérique Matla; Joosje Burg; Marleen Jochems; Pien Sanders; Marijn Veen; Laura Nunnink	Netherlands		Ye Jiao; Gu Bingfeng; Yang Liu; Zhang Ying; Chen Yi; Ma Ning; Li Hong; Ou Zixia; Dan Wen; Zou Meirong; He Jiangxin; Fan Yunxia; Chen Yang; Xu Wenyu; Zhong Jiaqi; Tan Jinzhuang	China	Sofía Toccalino; Agustina Gorzelany; Valentina Raposo; Agostina Alonso; Agustina Albertario; María José Granatto; Cristina Cosentino; Rocío Sánchez Moccia; Victoria Sauze; Sofía Cairó; Eugenia Trinchinetti; Lara Casas; Juana Castellaro; Pilar Campoy; Julieta Jankunas; Zoe Díaz	Argentina	
Football	Men's	Arnau Tenas; Marc Pubill; Juan Miranda; Eric García; Pau Cubarsí; Pablo Barrios; Diego López; Beñat Turrientes; Abel Ruiz; Álex Baena; Fermín López; Jon Pacheco; Joan García; Aimar Oroz; Miguel Gutiérrez; Adrián Bernabé; Sergio Gómez; Samu Omorodion; Cristhian Mosquera; Juanlu Sánchez; Sergio Camello; Alejandro Iturbe	Spain		Obed Nkambadio; Castello Lukeba; Adrien Truffert; Loïc Badé; Kiliann Sildillia; Manu Koné; Michael Olise; Maghnes Akliouche; Arnaud Kalimuendo; Alexandre Lacazette; Désiré Doué; Enzo Millot; Joris Chotard; Jean-Philippe Mateta; Bradley Locko; Guillaume Restes; Soungoutou Magassa; Rayan Cherki; Chrislain Matsima; Andy Diouf; Johann Lepenant	France	Munir Mohamedi; Achraf Hakimi; Akram Nakach; Mehdi Boukamir; Adil Tahif; Benjamin Bouchouari; Eliesse Ben Seghir; Bilal El Khannous; Soufiane Rahimi; Ilias Akhomach; Zakaria El Ouahdi; Rachid Ghanimi; Yassine Kechta; Oussama Targhalline; El Mehdi Maouhoub; Abde Ezzalzouli; Oussama El Azzouzi; Amir Richardson; Haytam Manaout	Morocco	
Gymnastics	Rhythmic individual all-around	Darja Varfolomeev	Germany		Boryana Kaleyn	Bulgaria	Sofia Raffaeli	Italy	
Sailing	Men's Formula Kite	Valentin Bontus	Austria		Toni Vodišek	Slovenia	Maximilian Maeder	Singapore	
Sport climbing	Men's combined	Toby Roberts	Great Britain		Sorato Anraku	Japan	Jakob Schubert	Austria	
Swimming	Men's marathon 10 km	Kristóf Rasovszky	Hungary		Oliver Klemet	Germany	Dávid Betlehem	Hungary	
Table tennis	Men's team	Wang Chuqin; Ma Long; Fan Zhendong	China		Anton Källberg; Truls Möregårdh; Kristian Karlsson	Sweden	Félix Lebrun; Alexis Lebrun; Simon Gauzy	France	
Taekwondo	Men's 80 kg	Firas Katoussi	Tunisia		Mehran Barkhordari	Iran	Simone Alessio	Italy	
Taekwondo	Men's 80 kg	Firas Katoussi	Tunisia		Mehran Barkhordari	Iran	Edi Hrnic	Denmark	
Taekwondo	Women's 67 kg	Viviana Márton	Hungary		Aleksandra Perišić	Serbia	Kristina Teachout	United States	
Taekwondo	Women's 67 kg	Viviana Márton	Hungary		Aleksandra Perišić	Serbia	Sarah Chaâri	Belgium	
Volleyball	Women's beach	Ana Patrícia; Duda Lisboa	Brazil		Melissa Humana-Paredes; Brandie Wilkerson	Canada	Tanja Hüberli; Nina Betschart	Switzerland	
Weightlifting	Men's 89 kg	Karlos Nasar	Bulgaria	WR	Yeison López	Colombia	Antonino Pizzolato	Italy	
Weightlifting	Women's 71 kg	Olivia Reeves	United States	OR	Mari Sánchez	Colombia	Angie Palacios	Ecuador	
Wrestling	Men's freestyle 57 kg	Rei Higuchi	Japan		Spencer Lee	United States	Aman Sehrawat	India	
Wrestling	Men's freestyle 57 kg	Rei Higuchi	Japan		Spencer Lee	United States	Gulomjon Abdullaev	Uzbekistan	
Wrestling	Men's freestyle 86 kg	Magomed Ramazanov	Bulgaria		Hassan Yazdani	Iran	Aaron Brooks	United States	
Wrestling	Men's freestyle 86 kg	Magomed Ramazanov	Bulgaria		Hassan Yazdani	Iran	Dauren Kurugliev	Greece	
Wrestling	Women's freestyle 57 kg	Tsugumi Sakurai	Japan		Anastasia Nichita	Moldova	Helen Maroulis	United States	
Wrestling	Women's freestyle 57 kg	Tsugumi Sakurai	Japan		Anastasia Nichita	Moldova	Hong Kexin	China	

=== Day 15: 10 August ===
Sport	Event	Gold medalist(s)			Silver medalist(s)		Bronze medalist(s)		Ref
Sport	Event	Competitor(s)	Team	Rec	Competitor(s)	Team	Competitor(s)	Team	Ref
Artistic swimming	Women's duet	Wang Qianyi; Wang Liuyi	China		Kate Shortman; Isabelle Thorpe	Great Britain	Bregje de Brouwer; Noortje de Brouwer	Netherlands	
Athletics	Men's 800 m	Emmanuel Wanyonyi	Kenya		Marco Arop	Canada	Djamel Sedjati	Algeria	
Athletics	Men's 5000 m	Jakob Ingebrigtsen	Norway		Ronald Kwemoi	Kenya	Grant Fisher	United States	
Athletics	Men's 4 × 400 m relay	Christopher Bailey; Vernon Norwood; Bryce Deadmon; Rai Benjamin	United States	OR	Bayapo Ndori; Busang Kebinatshipi; Anthony Pesela; Letsile Tebogo	Botswana	Alex Haydock-Wilson; Matthew Hudson-Smith; Lewis Davey; Charlie Dobson	Great Britain	
Athletics	Men's high jump	Hamish Kerr	New Zealand		Shelby McEwen	United States	Mutaz Barsham	Qatar	
Athletics	Men's marathon	Tamirat Tola	Ethiopia	OR	Bashir Abdi	Belgium	Benson Kipruto	Kenya	
Athletics	Women's 100 m hurdles	Masai Russell	United States		Cyréna Samba-Mayela	France	Jasmine Camacho-Quinn	Puerto Rico	
Athletics	Women's 1500 m	Faith Kipyegon	Kenya	OR	Jessica Hull	Australia	Georgia Bell	Great Britain	
Athletics	Women's 4 × 400 m relay	Shamier Little; Sydney McLaughlin-Levrone; Gabrielle Thomas; Alexis Holmes	United States		Lieke Klaver; Cathelijn Peeters; Lisanne de Witte; Femke Bol	Netherlands	Victoria Ohuruogu; Laviai Nielsen; Nicole Yeargin; Amber Anning	Great Britain	
Athletics	Women's javelin throw	Haruka Kitaguchi	Japan		Jo-Ane van Dyk	South Africa	Nikola Ogrodníková	Czech Republic	
Basketball	Men's	Stephen Curry; Anthony Edwards; LeBron James; Kevin Durant; Derrick White; Tyrese Haliburton; Jayson Tatum; Joel Embiid; Jrue Holiday; Bam Adebayo; Anthony Davis; Devin Booker	United States		Frank Ntilikina; Nicolas Batum; Andrew Albicy; Guerschon Yabusele; Isaïa Cordinier; Evan Fournier; Nando de Colo; Mathias Lessort; Rudy Gobert; Victor Wembanyama; Matthew Strazel; Bilal Coulibaly	France	Uroš Plavšić; Filip Petrušev; Nikola Jović; Bogdan Bogdanović; Vanja Marinković; Ognjen Dobrić; Nikola Jokić; Vasilije Micić; Marko Gudurić; Dejan Davidovac; Aleksa Avramović; Nikola Milutinov	Serbia	
Boxing	Men's 57 kg	Abdumalik Khalokov	Uzbekistan		Munarbek Seiitbek Uulu	Kyrgyzstan	Charlie Senior	Australia	
Boxing	Men's 57 kg	Abdumalik Khalokov	Uzbekistan		Munarbek Seiitbek Uulu	Kyrgyzstan	Javier Ibáñez	Bulgaria	
Boxing	Men's +92 kg	Bakhodir Jalolov	Uzbekistan		Ayoub Ghadfa	Spain	Nelvie Tiafack	Germany	
Boxing	Men's +92 kg	Bakhodir Jalolov	Uzbekistan		Ayoub Ghadfa	Spain	Djamili-Dini Aboudou Moindze	France	
Boxing	Women's 57 kg	Lin Yu-ting	Chinese Taipei		Julia Szeremeta	Poland	Esra Yıldız	Turkey	
Boxing	Women's 57 kg	Lin Yu-ting	Chinese Taipei		Julia Szeremeta	Poland	Nesthy Petecio	Philippines	
Boxing	Women's 75 kg	Li Qian	China		Atheyna Bylon	Panama	Caitlin Parker	Australia	
Boxing	Women's 75 kg	Li Qian	China		Atheyna Bylon	Panama	Cindy Ngamba	Refugee Olympic Team	
Breaking	B-Boys	Philip Kim	Canada		Danis Civil	France	Victor Montalvo	United States	
Canoeing	Men's K-1 1000 m	Josef Dostál	Czech Republic		Ádám Varga	Hungary	Bálint Kopasz	Hungary	
Canoeing	Women's C-1 200 m	Katie Vincent	Canada		Nevin Harrison	United States	Yarisleidis Cirilo	Cuba	
Canoeing	Women's K-1 500 m	Lisa Carrington	New Zealand		Tamara Csipes	Hungary	Emma Jørgensen	Denmark	
Cycling	Men's madison	Iúri Leitão; Rui Oliveira	Portugal		Simone Consonni; Elia Viviani	Italy	Niklas Larsen; Michael Mørkøv	Denmark	
Diving	Men's 10 m platform	Cao Yuan	China		Rikuto Tamai	Japan	Noah Williams	Great Britain	
Football	Women's	Alyssa Naeher; Emily Fox; Korbin Albert; Naomi Girma; Trinity Rodman; Casey Krueger; Crystal Dunn; Lynn Williams; Mallory Swanson; Lindsey Horan; Sophia Smith; Tierna Davidson; Jenna Nighswonger; Emily Sonnett; Jaedyn Shaw; Rose Lavelle; Sam Coffey; Casey Murphy; Croix Bethune; Emily Sams	United States		Lorena; Antônia; Tarciane; Rafaelle Souza; Duda Sampaio; Tamires; Kerolin; Vitória Yaya; Adriana; Marta; Jheniffer; Tainá; Yasmim; Ludmila; Thaís; Gabi Nunes; Ana Vitória; Gabi Portilho; Priscila; Angelina; Lauren; Luciana	Brazil	Merle Frohms; Sarai Linder; Kathrin Hendrich; Bibiane Schulze; Marina Hegering; Janina Minge; Lea Schüller; Sydney Lohmann; Sjoeke Nüsken; Laura Freigang; Alexandra Popp; Ann-Katrin Berger; Sara Doorsoun; Elisa Senß; Giulia Gwinn; Jule Brand; Klara Bühl; Vivien Endemann; Felicitas Rauch; Nicole Anyomi	Germany	
Golf	Women's	Lydia Ko	New Zealand		Esther Henseleit	Germany	Lin Xiyu	China	
Gymnastics	Rhythmic group all-around	Guo Qiqi; Hao Ting; Huang Zhangjiayang; Wang Lanjing; Ding Xinyi	China		Ofir Shaham; Diana Svertsov; Adar Friedmann; Romi Paritzki; Shani Bakanov	Israel	Alessia Maurelli; Martina Centofanti; Agnese Duranti; Daniela Mogurean; Laura Paris	Italy	
Handball	Women's	Veronica Kristiansen; Maren Nyland Aardahl; Stine Skogrand; Nora Mørk; Stine Bredal Oftedal; Silje Solberg-Østhassel; Kari Brattset Dale; Kristine Breistøl; Vilde Ingstad; Katrine Lunde; Marit Røsberg Jacobsen; Camilla Herrem; Sanna Solberg-Isaksen; Henny Reistad; Thale Rushfeldt Deila	Norway		Laura Glauser; Méline Nocandy; Alicia Toublanc; Chloé Valentini; Coralie Lassource; Grâce Zaadi; Laura Flippes; Cléopatre Darleux; Orlane Kanor; Tamara Horacek; Pauletta Foppa; Estelle Nze Minko; Oriane Ondono; Lucie Granier; Sarah Bouktit; Léna Grandveau; Hatadou Sako	France	Sandra Toft; Sarah Iversen; Helena Elver; Anne Mette Hansen; Kathrine Heindahl; Line Haugsted; Althea Reinhardt; Mette Tranborg; Kristina Jørgensen; Trine Østergaard; Louise Burgaard; Mie Højlund; Emma Friis; Rikke Iversen; Michala Møller	Denmark	
Modern pentathlon	Men's	Ahmed El-Gendy	Egypt		Taishu Sato	Japan	Giorgio Malan	Italy	
Sport climbing	Women's combined	Janja Garnbret	Slovenia		Brooke Raboutou	United States	Jessica Pilz	Austria	
Table tennis	Women's team	Sun Yingsha; Wang Manyu; Chen Meng	China		Hina Hayata; Miwa Harimoto; Miu Hirano	Japan	Shin Yu-bin; Jeon Ji-hee; Lee Eun-hye	South Korea	
Taekwondo	Men's +80 kg	Arian Salimi	Iran		Caden Cunningham	Great Britain	Rafael Alba	Cuba	
Taekwondo	Men's +80 kg	Arian Salimi	Iran		Caden Cunningham	Great Britain	Cheick Sallah Cissé	Ivory Coast	
Taekwondo	Women's +67 kg	Althéa Laurin	France		Svetlana Osipova	Uzbekistan	Lee Da-bin	South Korea	
Taekwondo	Women's +67 kg	Althéa Laurin	France		Svetlana Osipova	Uzbekistan	Nafia Kuş	Turkey	
Volleyball	Men's beach	David Åhman; Jonatan Hellvig	Sweden		Nils Ehlers; Clemens Wickler	Germany	Anders Mol; Christian Sørum	Norway	
Volleyball	Men's tournament	Barthélémy Chinenyeze; Jenia Grebennikov; Jean Patry; Benjamin Toniutti; Kévin Tillie; Earvin N'Gapeth; Antoine Brizard; Nicolas Le Goff; Trévor Clévenot; Yacine Louati; Théo Faure; Quentin Jouffroy	France		Łukasz Kaczmarek; Bartosz Kurek; Wilfredo León; Aleksander Śliwka; Grzegorz Łomacz; Jakub Kochanowski; Kamil Semeniuk; Paweł Zatorski; Marcin Janusz; Mateusz Bieniek; Tomasz Fornal; Norbert Huber	Poland	Matt Anderson; Aaron Russell; Jeffrey Jendryk; Torey DeFalco; Micah Christenson; Maxwell Holt; Micah Maʻa; Thomas Jaeschke; Garrett Muagututia; Taylor Averill; David Smith; Erik Shoji	United States	
Water polo	Women's	Laura Ester; Isabel Piralkova; Anni Espar; Beatriz Ortiz; Nona Pérez; Paula Crespí; Elena Ruiz; Pili Peña; Judith Forca; Paula Camus; Maica García Godoy; Paula Leitón; Martina Terré	Spain		Gabriella Palm; Keesja Gofers; Elle Armit; Bronte Halligan; Sienna Green; Abby Andrews; Charlize Andrews; Sienna Hearn; Zoe Arancini; Alice Williams; Matilda Kearns; Danijela Jackovich; Genevieve Longman	Australia	Laura Aarts; Iris Wolves; Brigitte Sleeking; Sabrina van der Sloot; Maartje Keuning; Simone van de Kraats; Bente Rogge; Vivian Sevenich; Kitty-Lynn Joustra; Lieke Rogge; Lola Moolhuijzen; Nina ten Broek; Sarah Buis	Netherlands	
Weightlifting	Men's 102 kg	Liu Huanhua	China		Akbar Djuraev	Uzbekistan	Yauheni Tsikhantsou	Individual Neutral Athletes	
Weightlifting	Men's +102 kg	Lasha Talakhadze	Georgia		Varazdat Lalayan	Armenia	Gor Minasyan	Bahrain	
Weightlifting	Women's 81 kg	Solfrid Koanda	Norway		Sara Ahmed	Egypt	Neisi Dájomes	Ecuador	
Wrestling	Men's freestyle 74 kg	Razambek Zhamalov	Uzbekistan		Daichi Takatani	Japan	Kyle Dake	United States	
Wrestling	Men's freestyle 74 kg	Razambek Zhamalov	Uzbekistan		Daichi Takatani	Japan	Chermen Valiev	Albania	
Wrestling	Men's freestyle 125 kg	Geno Petriashvili	Georgia		Amir Hossein Zare	Iran	Taha Akgül	Turkey	
Wrestling	Men's freestyle 125 kg	Geno Petriashvili	Georgia		Amir Hossein Zare	Iran	Giorgi Meshvildishvili	Azerbaijan	
Wrestling	Women's freestyle 62 kg	Sakura Motoki	Japan		Iryna Koliadenko	Ukraine	Aisuluu Tynybekova	Kyrgyzstan	
Wrestling	Women's freestyle 62 kg	Sakura Motoki	Japan		Iryna Koliadenko	Ukraine	Grace Bullen	Norway	

=== Day 16: 11 August ===
Closing ceremony

- The closing ceremony would be held at Stade de France, at 21:00 local time. It included the traditional Olympic flag handover to Los Angeles, United States, the host city of the next Summer Olympics in 2028.

Sport	Event	Gold medalist(s)			Silver medalist(s)		Bronze medalist(s)		Ref
Sport	Event	Competitor(s)	Team	Rec	Competitor(s)	Team	Competitor(s)	Team	Ref
Athletics	Women's marathon	Sifan Hassan	Netherlands	OR	Tigst Assefa	Ethiopia	Hellen Obiri	Kenya	
Basketball	Women's	Jewell Loyd; Kelsey Plum; Sabrina Ionescu; Kahleah Copper; Chelsea Gray; A'ja Wilson; Breanna Stewart; Napheesa Collier; Diana Taurasi; Jackie Young; Alyssa Thomas; Brittney Griner	United States		Marine Fauthoux; Alexia Chery; Sarah Michel; Valériane Ayayi; Iliana Rupert; Janelle Salaün; Dominique Malonga; Gabby Williams; Marième Badiane; Marine Johannès; Leïla Lacan; Romane Bernies	France	Jade Melbourne; Kristy Wallace; Stephanie Talbot; Tess Madgen; Alanna Smith; Ezi Magbegor; Marianna Tolo; Cayla George; Amy Atwell; Isobel Borlase; Lauren Jackson; Sami Whitcomb	Australia	
Cycling	Men's keirin	Harrie Lavreysen	Netherlands		Matthew Richardson	Australia	Matthew Glaetzer	Australia	
Cycling	Women's omnium	Jennifer Valente	United States		Daria Pikulik	Poland	Ally Wollaston	New Zealand	
Cycling	Women's sprint	Ellesse Andrews	New Zealand		Lea Friedrich	Germany	Emma Finucane	Great Britain	
Handball	Men's	Niklas Landin Jacobsen; Niclas Kirkeløkke; Magnus Landin Jacobsen; Emil Jakobsen; Rasmus Lauge; Emil Nielsen; Magnus Saugstrup; Hans Lindberg; Mathias Gidsel; Henrik Møllgaard; Mikkel Hansen; Lukas Jørgensen; Lasse Andersson; Simon Hald; Thomas Sommer Arnoldsen; Simon Pytlick	Denmark		David Späth; Johannes Golla; Luca Witzke; Sebastian Heymann; Justus Fischer; Juri Knorr; Julian Köster; Renārs Uščins; Kai Häfner; Tim Hornke; Andreas Wolff; Rune Dahmke; Lukas Mertens; Christoph Steinert; Marko Grgić; Jannik Kohlbacher	Germany	Gonzalo Pérez de Vargas; Jorge Maqueda; Alex Dujshebaev; Rodrigo Corrales; Adrià Figueras; Imanol Garciandia; Abel Serdio; Agustín Casado; Aleix Gómez; Ian Tarrafeta; Miguel Sánchez-Migallón; Daniel Dujshebaev; Kauldi Odriozola; Daniel Fernández; Javier Rodríguez Moreno	Spain	
Modern pentathlon	Women's	Michelle Gulyás	Hungary		Élodie Clouvel	France	Seong Seung-min	South Korea	
Volleyball	Women's tournament	Marina Lubian; Carlotta Cambi; Monica De Gennaro; Alessia Orro; Caterina Bosetti; Anna Danesi; Myriam Sylla; Paola Egonu; Sarah Luisa Fahr; Loveth Omoruyi; Ekaterina Antropova; Gaia Giovannini	Italy		Micha Hancock; Jordyn Poulter; Avery Skinner; Justine Wong-Orantes; Lauren Carlini; Jordan Larson; Annie Drews; Jordan Thompson; Haleigh Washington; Dana Rettke; Kathryn Plummer; Kelsey Robinson; Chiaka Ogbogu	United States	Nyeme Costa; Diana Duarte; Macris Carneiro; Thaísa Menezes; Rosamaria Montibeller; Roberta Ratzke; Gabriela Guimarães; Ana Cristina de Souza; Natália Araújo; Ana Carolina da Silva; Júlia Bergmann; Tainara Santos; Lorenne Teixeira	Brazil	
Water polo	Men's	Radoslav Filipović; Dušan Mandić; Strahinja Rašović; Sava Ranđelović; Miloš Ćuk; Nikola Dedović; Radomir Drašović; Nikola Jakšić; Nemanja Ubović; Nemanja Vico; Petar Jakšić; Viktor Rašović; Vladimir Mišović	Serbia		Marko Bijač; Rino Burić; Loren Fatović; Luka Lončar; Maro Joković; Luka Bukić; Ante Vukičević; Marko Žuvela; Jerko Marinić Kragić; Josip Vrlić; Matias Biljaka; Konstantin Kharkov; Toni Popadić	Croatia	Adrian Weinberg; Johnny Hooper; Marko Vavic; Alex Obert; Hannes Daube; Luca Cupido; Ben Hallock; Dylan Woodhead; Alex Bowen; Chase Dodd; Ryder Dodd; Max Irving; Drew Holland	United States	
Weightlifting	Women's +81 kg	Li Wenwen	China		Park Hye-jeong	South Korea	Emily Campbell	Great Britain	
Wrestling	Men's freestyle 65 kg	Kotaro Kiyooka	Japan		Rahman Amouzad	Iran	Sebastian Rivera	Puerto Rico	
Wrestling	Men's freestyle 65 kg	Kotaro Kiyooka	Japan		Rahman Amouzad	Iran	Islam Dudaev	Albania	
Wrestling	Men's freestyle 97 kg	Akhmed Tazhudinov	Bahrain		Givi Matcharashvili	Georgia	Magomedkhan Magomedov	Azerbaijan	
Wrestling	Men's freestyle 97 kg	Akhmed Tazhudinov	Bahrain		Givi Matcharashvili	Georgia	Amir Ali Azarpira	Iran	
Wrestling	Women's freestyle 76 kg	Yuka Kagami	Japan		Kennedy Blades	United States	Milaimys Marín	Cuba	
Wrestling	Women's freestyle 76 kg	Yuka Kagami	Japan		Kennedy Blades	United States	Tatiana Rentería	Colombia	
