= 2023 World Rowing Championships – Men's coxless four =

Men's coxless four at the 2023 World Rowing Championships
- Venue: Lake Sava
- Location: Belgrade, Serbia
- Dates: 4 September – 9 September
- Competitors: 64 from 16 nations
- Winning time: 6:04.35

Medalists
gold medal	Oliver Wilkes; David Ambler; Matthew Aldridge; Freddie Davidson	Great Britain
silver medal	Justin Best; Nicholas Mead; Michael Grady; Liam Corrigan	United States
bronze medal	Ollie Fitzroy Maclean; Logan Ullrich; Tom Murray; Matt Macdonald	New Zealand

The men's coxless four competition at the 2023 World Rowing Championships took place at Lake Sava, in Belgrade.

== Schedule ==
The schedule was as follows:

Date	Time	Round
Monday 4 September 2023	11:09	Heats
Tuesday 5 September 2023	12:15	Repechages
Thursday 7 September 2023	11:15	Semifinals A/B
Saturday 9 September 2023	10:33	Final C
Saturday 9 September 2023	12:00	Final B
Saturday 9 September 2023	14:54	Final A

All times are Central European Summer Time (UTC+2)

== Results ==
=== Heats ===
The fastest two boats in each heat advanced directly to the AB semifinals. The remaining boats were sent to the repechages.

==== Heat 1 ====
Rank	Rower	Country	Time	Notes
1	Justin Best; Nicholas Mead; Michael Grady; Liam Corrigan	United States	6:01.51	SA/B
2	Alexander Hill; Spencer Turrin; Jack Hargreaves; Alexander Purnell	Australia	6:03.76	SA/B
3	Maksym Boklazhenko; Mykola Mazur; Oleh Kravchenko; Serhiy Hryn	Ukraine	6:08.37	R
4	Joel Schürch; Tim Roth; Patrick Brunner; Kai Schätzle	Switzerland	6:13.74	R
5	Henry Torr; Luc Daffarn; James Mitchell; Sandro Torrente	South Africa	6:17.06	R
6	Fionnan Mc Quillan-Tolan; Adam Murphy; Jack Dorney; John Kearney	Ireland	6:22.23	R

==== Heat 2 ====
Rank	Rower	Country	Time	Notes
1	Oliver Wilkes; David Ambler; Matthew Aldridge; Freddie Davidson	Great Britain	6:03.65	SA/B
2	Thibaud Turlan; Guillaume Turlan; Benoit Brunet; Teo Rayet	France	6:06.00	SA/B
3	Mihaita Tiganescu; Mugurel Vasile Semciuc; Stefan Berariu; Florin Lehaci	Romania	6:07.99	R
4	Paolo Covini; Alessandro Bonamoneta; Davide Verità; Alfonso Scalzone	Italy	6:12.39	R
5	Magnus Valbirk; Kaare Mortensen; Christian Soendergaard; Bastian Secher	Denmark	6:16.49	R

==== Heat 3 ====
Rank	Rower	Country	Time	Notes
1	Niki van Sprang; Ruben Knab; Ralf Rienks; Rik Rienks	Netherlands	5:59.50	SA/B
2	Ollie Fitzroy Maclean; Logan Ullrich; Tom Murray; Matt Macdonald	New Zealand	6:00.41	SA/B
3	Łukasz Posyłajka; Mateusz Wilangowski; Mikołaj Burda; Michał Szpakowski	Poland	6:09.59	R
4	Theis Hagemeister; Malte Großmann; Mark Hinrichs; Soenke Kruse	Germany	6:10.83	R
5	Li Wenlei; Chen Xianfeng; Xu Qiao; Cai Pengpeng	China	6:13.52	R

=== Repechages ===
The three fastest boats in each repechage advanced to the AB semifinals. The remaining boats were sent to the C final.

==== Repechage 1 ====
Rank	Rower	Country	Time	Notes
1	Mihaita Tiganescu; Mugurel Vasile Semciuc; Stefan Berariu; Florin Lehaci	Romania	5:54.48	SA/B
2	Maksym Boklazhenko; Mykola Mazur; Oleh Kravchenko; Serhiy Hryn	Ukraine	5:55.61	SA/B
3	Magnus Valbirk; Kaare Mortensen; Christian Soendergaard; Bastian Secher	Denmark	5:57.32	SA/B
4	Theis Hagemeister; Malte Großmann; Mark Hinrichs; Soenke Kruse	Germany	5:57.56	FC
5	Fionnan Mc Quillan-Tolan; Adam Murphy; Jack Dorney; John Kearney	Ireland	6:03.69	FC

==== Repechage 2 ====
Rank	Rower	Country	Time	Notes
1	Paolo Covini; Alessandro Bonamoneta; Davide Verità; Alfonso Scalzone	Italy	5:55.28	SA/B
2	Joel Schürch; Tim Roth; Patrick Brunner; Kai Schätzle	Switzerland	5:55.51	SA/B
3	Henry Torr; Luc Daffarn; James Mitchell; Sandro Torrente	South Africa	5:56.34	SA/B
4	Łukasz Posyłajka; Mateusz Wilangowski; Mikołaj Burda; Michał Szpakowski	Poland	5:56.36	FC
5	Li Wenlei; Chen Xianfeng; Xu Qiao; Cai Pengpeng	China	6:03.63	FC

=== Semifinals A/B ===
The fastest three boats in each Semifinal advanced to the A final. The remaining boats were sent to the B final.

==== Semifinal 1 ====
Rank	Rower	Country	Time	Notes
1	Justin Best; Nicholas Mead; Michael Grady; Liam Corrigan	United States	6:25.99	FA
2	Niki van Sprang; Ruben Knab; Ralf Rienks; Rik Rienks	Netherlands	6:28.48	FA
3	Thibaud Turlan; Guillaume Turlan; Benoit Brunet; Teo Rayet	France	6:30.40	FA
4	Paolo Covini; Alessandro Bonamoneta; Davide Verità; Alfonso Scalzone	Italy	6:33.81	FB
5	Maksym Boklazhenko; Mykola Mazur; Oleh Kravchenko; Serhiy Hryn	Ukraine	6:40.81	FB
6	Magnus Valbirk; Kaare Mortensen; Christian Soendergaard; Bastian Secher	Denmark	6:44.85	FB

==== Semifinal 2 ====
Rank	Rower	Country	Time	Notes
1	Oliver Wilkes; David Ambler; Matthew Aldridge; Freddie Davidson	Great Britain	6:26.39	FA
2	Ollie Fitzroy Maclean; Logan Ullrich; Tom Murray; Matt Macdonald	New Zealand	6:31.14	FA
3	Alexander Hill; Spencer Turrin; Jack Hargreaves; Alexander Purnell	Australia	6:38.28	FA
4	Mihaita Tiganescu; Mugurel Vasile Semciuc; Stefan Berariu; Florin Lehaci	Romania	6:44.95	FB
5	Joel Schürch; Tim Roth; Patrick Brunner; Kai Schätzle	Switzerland	6:47.32	FB
6	Henry Torr; Luc Daffarn; James Mitchell; Sandro Torrente	South Africa	6:55.35	FB

=== Finals ===
The A final determined the rankings for places 1 to 6. Additional rankings were determined in the other finals.

==== Final C ====
Rank	Rower	Country	Time	Total rank
1	Łukasz Posyłajka; Mateusz Wilangowski; Mikołaj Burda; Michał Szpakowski	Poland	5:58.76	13
2	Li Wenlei; Chen Xianfeng; Xu Qiao; Cai Pengpeng	China	6:02.32	14
3	Fionnan Mc Quillan-Tolan; Adam Murphy; Jack Dorney; John Kearney	Ireland	6:02.82	15
4	Theis Hagemeister; Malte Großmann; Mark Hinrichs; Soenke Kruse	Germany	6:03.24	16

==== Final B ====
Rank	Rower	Country	Time	Total rank
1	Mihaita Tiganescu; Mugurel Vasile Semciuc; Stefan Berariu; Florin Lehaci	Romania	6:03.08	7
2	Joel Schürch; Tim Roth; Patrick Brunner; Kai Schätzle	Switzerland	6:05.44	8
3	Paolo Covini; Alessandro Bonamoneta; Davide Verità; Alfonso Scalzone	Italy	6:06.44	9
4	Henry Torr; Luc Daffarn; James Mitchell; Sandro Torrente	South Africa	6:08.96	10
5	Maksym Boklazhenko; Mykola Mazur; Oleh Kravchenko; Serhiy Hryn	Ukraine	6:10.68	11
6	Magnus Valbirk; Kaare Mortensen; Christian Soendergaard; Bastian Secher	Denmark	6:11.07	12

==== Final A ====
Rank	Rower	Country	Time
1st place, gold medalist(s)	Oliver Wilkes; David Ambler; Matthew Aldridge; Freddie Davidson	Great Britain	6:04.35
2nd place, silver medalist(s)	Justin Best; Nicholas Mead; Michael Grady; Liam Corrigan	United States	6:06.37
3rd place, bronze medalist(s)	Ollie Fitzroy Maclean; Logan Ullrich; Tom Murray; Matt Macdonald	New Zealand	6:08.44
4	Niki van Sprang; Ruben Knab; Ralf Rienks; Rik Rienks	Netherlands	6:12.38
5	Alexander Hill; Spencer Turrin; Jack Hargreaves; Alexander Purnell	Australia	6:20.09
6	Thibaud Turlan; Guillaume Turlan; Benoit Brunet; Teo Rayet	France	6:24.94
