= 2022 World Rowing Championships – Men's coxless four =

Men's coxless four at the 2022 World Rowing Championships
- Venue: Labe aréna
- Location: Račice, Czech Republic
- Dates: 19 September – 24 September
- Competitors: 76 from 19 nations
- Winning time: 5:48.29

Medalists
gold medal	William Stewart; Sam Nunn; David Ambler; Freddie Davidson	Great Britain
silver medal	Alexander Purnell; Spencer Turrin; Jack Hargreaves; Joseph O'Brien	Australia
bronze medal	Ralf Rienks; Ruben Knab; Sander de Graaf; Rik Rienks	Netherlands

The men's coxless fours competition at the 2022 World Rowing Championships took place at the Račice regatta venue.

== Schedule ==
The schedule was as follows:

Date	Time	Round
Monday 19 September 2022	11:59	Heats
Tuesday 20 September 2022	11:37	Repechages
Thursday 22 September 2022	12:05	Semifinals A/B
Thursday 22 September 2022	16:20	Semifinals C/D
Saturday 24 September 2022	10:18	Final D
Saturday 24 September 2022	10:56	Final C
Saturday 24 September 2022	12:28	Final B
Saturday 24 September 2022	14:54	Final A

All times are Central European Summer Time (UTC+2)

== Results ==
=== Heats ===
The two fastest boats in each heat advanced directly to the semifinals A/B. The remaining boats were sent to the repechages.

==== Heat 1 ====
Rank	Rower	Country	Time	Notes
1	Mihaita Tiganescu; Mugurel Semciuc; Ștefan Berariu; Florin Lehaci	Romania	5:54.90	SA/B
2	Luc Daffarn; Jake Green; Damien Bonhage-Koen; Christopher Baxter	South Africa	5:57.15	SA/B
3	Chen Xianfeng; Li Wenlei; Xu Qiao; Cai Pengpeng	China	5:58.46	R
4	Povilas Stankunas; Martynas Džiaugys; Povilas Juskevicius; Mantas Juskevicius	Lithuania	6:37.01	R
5	Magnus Valbirk; Magnus Rathenborg; Kaare Mortensen; Tobias Bork Kristensen	Denmark	6:01.81	R

==== Heat 2 ====
Rank	Rower	Country	Time	Notes
1	William Stewart; Sam Nunn; David Ambler; Freddie Davidson	Great Britain	5:54.90	SA/B
2	Jack Dorney; Nathan Timoney; Ross Corrigan; John Kearney	Ireland	5:57.95	SA/B
3	Maksym Boklazhenko; Mykola Mazur; Serhiy Hryn; Oleksii Selivanov	Ukraine	6:01.13	R
4	Cesare Gabbia; Vincenzo Abbagnale; Salvatore Monfrecola; Nunzio Di Colandrea	Italy	6:05.85	R
5	Dmytro Baranivskyj; Jakub Kyncl; Matej Mach; Adam Kapa	Czech Republic	6:19.28	R

==== Heat 3 ====
Rank	Rower	Country	Time	Notes
1	Ralf Rienks; Ruben Knab; Sander de Graaf; Rik Rienks	Netherlands	5:52.36	SA/B
2	Lukasz Posylajka; Piotr Juszczak; Mikołaj Burda; Mateusz Wilangowski	Poland	5:54.21	SA/B
3	Theis Hagemeister; Malte Großmann; Max John; Marc Kammann	Germany	6:01.76	R
4	Armand Pfister; Teo Rayet; Thibaud Turlan; Louis Chamorand	France	6:06.99	R
5	Ali Buton; Ferdiansyah Ferdiansyah; Denri Maulidzar Al Ghifari; Ardi Isadi	Indonesia	6:29.55	R

==== Heat 4 ====
Rank	Rower	Country	Time	Notes
1	Alexander Purnell; Spencer Turrin; Jack Hargreaves; Joseph O'Brien	Australia	5:53.31	SA/B
2	Henry Hollingsworth; Nick Mead; Augustine Rodriguez; Rhett Burns	United States	5:55.13	SA/B
3	Roman Röösli; Joel Schürch; Andrin Gulich; Tim Roth	Switzerland	5:55.38	R
4	Gabriel Stekl; Lorenz Lindorfer; Jakob Stadler; Rudolph Querfeld	Austria	6:19.30	R

=== Repechages ===
The two fastest boats in each repechage advanced to the A/B semifinals. The remaining boats were sent to the C/D semifinals.

==== Repechage 1 ====
Rank	Rower	Country	Time	Notes
1	Maksym Boklazhenko; Mykola Mazur; Serhiy Hryn; Oleksii Selivanov	Ukraine	5:56.90	SA/B
2	Armand Pfister; Teo Rayet; Thibaud Turlan; Louis Chamorand	France	5:58.12	SA/B
3	Chen Xianfeng; Li Wenlei; Xu Qiao; Cai Pengpeng	China	6:00.23	SC/D
4	Gabriel Stekl; Lorenz Lindorfer; Jakob Stadler; Rudolph Querfeld	Austria	6:03.68	SC/D
5	Ali Buton; Ferdiansyah Ferdiansyah; Denri Maulidzar Al Ghifari; Ardi Isadi	Indonesia	6:05.28	SC/D
6	Magnus Valbirk; Magnus Rathenborg; Kaare Mortensen; Tobias Bork Kristensen	Denmark	6:06.86	SC/D

==== Repechage 2 ====
Rank	Rower	Country	Time	Notes
1	Roman Röösli; Joel Schürch; Andrin Gulich; Tim Roth	Switzerland	5:55.56	SA/B
2	Theis Hagemeister; Malte Großmann; Max John; Marc Kammann	Germany	5:55.82	SA/B
3	Povilas Stankunas; Martynas Džiaugys; Povilas Juskevicius; Mantas Juskevicius	Lithuania	5:59.78	SC/D
4	Cesare Gabbia; Vincenzo Abbagnale; Salvatore Monfrecola; Nunzio Di Colandrea	Italy	6:01.41	SC/D
5	Dmytro Baranivskyj; Jakub Kyncl; Matej Mach; Adam Kapa	Czech Republic	6:15.26	SC/D

=== Semifinals C/D ===
The three fastest boats in semifinal 1 and two fastest boats in semifinal 2 advanced to the C final. The remaining boats were sent to the D final.

==== Semifinal 1 ====
Rank	Rower	Country	Time	Notes
1	Cesare Gabbia; Vincenzo Abbagnale; Salvatore Monfrecola; Nunzio Di Colandrea	Italy	6:12.88	FC
2	Magnus Valbirk; Magnus Rathenborg; Kaare Mortensen; Tobias Bork Kristensen	Denmark	6:13.42	FC
3	Chen Xianfeng; Li Wenlei; Xu Qiao; Cai Pengpeng	China	6:16.47	FC
4	Dmytro Baranivskyj; Jakub Kyncl; Matej Mach; Adam Kapa	Czech Republic	6:27.18	FD

==== Semifinal 2 ====
Rank	Rower	Country	Time	Notes
1	Gabriel Stekl; Lorenz Lindorfer; Jakob Stadler; Rudolph Querfeld	Austria	6:15.74	FC
2	Povilas Stankunas; Martynas Džiaugys; Povilas Juskevicius; Mantas Juskevicius	Lithuania	6:17.97	FC
3	Ali Buton; Ferdiansyah Ferdiansyah; Denri Maulidzar Al Ghifari; Ardi Isadi	Indonesia	6:21.16	FD

=== Semifinals A/B ===
The three fastest boats in each semi advanced to the A final. The remaining boats were sent to the B final.

==== Semifinal 1 ====
Rank	Rower	Country	Time	Notes
1	Ralf Rienks; Ruben Knab; Sander de Graaf; Rik Rienks	Netherlands	6:02.96	FA
2	Mihaita Tiganescu; Mugurel Semciuc; Ștefan Berariu; Florin Lehaci	Romania	6:03.06	FA
3	Roman Röösli; Joel Schürch; Andrin Gulich; Tim Roth	Switzerland	6:05.55	FA
4	Jack Dorney; Nathan Timoney; Ross Corrigan; John Kearney	Ireland	6:07.31	FB
5	Henry Hollingsworth; Nick Mead; Augustine Rodriguez; Rhett Burns	United States	6:09.33	FB
6	Armand Pfister; Teo Rayet; Thibaud Turlan; Louis Chamorand	France	6:14.51	FB

==== Semifinal 2 ====
Rank	Rower	Country	Time	Notes
1	William Stewart; Sam Nunn; David Ambler; Freddie Davidson	Great Britain	6:02.21	FA
2	Alexander Purnell; Spencer Turrin; Jack Hargreaves; Joseph O'Brien	Australia	6:04.68	FA
3	Maksym Boklazhenko; Mykola Mazur; Serhiy Hryn; Oleksii Selivanov	Ukraine	6:06.03	FA
4	Luc Daffarn; Jake Green; Damien Bonhage-Koen; Christopher Baxter	South Africa	6:09.05	FB
5	Theis Hagemeister; Malte Großmann; Max John; Marc Kammann	Germany	6:09.92	FB
6	Lukasz Posylajka; Piotr Juszczak; Mikołaj Burda; Mateusz Wilangowski	Poland	6:10.77	FB

=== Finals ===
The A final determined the rankings for places 1 to 6. Additional rankings were determined in the other finals

==== Final D ====
Rank	Rower	Country	Time	Total rank
1	Dmytro Baranivskyj; Jakub Kyncl; Matej Mach; Adam Kapa	Czech Republic	6:26.39	18
2	Ali Buton; Ferdiansyah Ferdiansyah; Denri Maulidzar Al Ghifari; Ardi Isadi	Indonesia	BUW	19

==== Final C ====
Rank	Rower	Country	Time	Total rank
1	Cesare Gabbia; Vincenzo Abbagnale; Salvatore Monfrecola; Nunzio Di Colandrea	Italy	6:03.58	13
2	Chen Xianfeng; Li Wenlei; Xu Qiao; Cai Pengpeng	China	6:04.71	14
3	Gabriel Stekl; Lorenz Lindorfer; Jakob Stadler; Rudolph Querfeld	Austria	6:07.25	15
4	Magnus Valbirk; Magnus Rathenborg; Kaare Mortensen; Tobias Bork Kristensen	Denmark	6:07.37	16
5	Povilas Stankunas; Martynas Džiaugys; Povilas Juskevicius; Mantas Juskevicius	Lithuania	6:09.13	17

==== Final B ====
Rank	Rower	Country	Time	Total rank
1	Theis Hagemeister; Malte Großmann; Max John; Marc Kammann	Germany	5:59.08	7
2	Jack Dorney; Nathan Timoney; Ross Corrigan; John Kearney	Ireland	5:59.16	8
3	Lukasz Posylajka; Piotr Juszczak; Mikołaj Burda; Mateusz Wilangowski	Poland	5:59.56	9
4	Henry Hollingsworth; Nick Mead; Augustine Rodriguez; Rhett Burns	United States	6:00.87	10
5	Luc Daffarn; Jake Green; Damien Bonhage-Koen; Christopher Baxter	South Africa	6:04.80	11
6	Armand Pfister; Teo Rayet; Thibaud Turlan; Louis Chamorand	France	6:10.46	12

==== Final A ====
Rank	Rower	Country	Time	Notes
1st place, gold medalist(s)	William Stewart; Sam Nunn; David Ambler; Freddie Davidson	Great Britain	5:48.29	
2nd place, silver medalist(s)	Alexander Purnell; Spencer Turrin; Jack Hargreaves; Joseph O'Brien	Australia	5:50.48	
3rd place, bronze medalist(s)	Ralf Rienks; Ruben Knab; Sander de Graaf; Rik Rienks	Netherlands	5:51.85	
4	Mihaita Tiganescu; Mugurel Semciuc; Ștefan Berariu; Florin Lehaci	Romania	5:57.85	
5	Roman Röösli; Joel Schürch; Andrin Gulich; Tim Roth	Switzerland	5:58.21	
6	Maksym Boklazhenko; Mykola Mazur; Serhiy Hryn; Oleksii Selivanov	Ukraine	5:58.89	
