= Rowing at the 2024 Summer Olympics – Men's coxless four =

Men's coxless four at the Games of the XXXIII Olympiad
- Olympic rowing
- Venue: Stade nautique de Vaires-sur-Marne
- Dates: 28 July – 1 August 2024
- Competitors: 36 from 9 nations
- Winning time: 5:49.03

Medalists
1st place, gold medalist(s)		Justin Best; Liam Corrigan; Michael Grady; Nick Mead	United States
2nd place, silver medalist(s)		Matt Macdonald; Oliver Maclean; Tom Murray; Logan Ullrich	New Zealand
3rd place, bronze medalist(s)		Matt Aldridge; David Ambler; Freddie Davidson; Oliver Wilkes	Great Britain

The men's coxless four event at the 2024 Summer Olympics took place from 28 July to 1 August 2024 at the Stade nautique de Vaires-sur-Marne. 36 rowers from 9 nations competed.

A team from the United States won the event for the first time since 1960.

== Schedule ==
All times are Central European Time (UTC+2)

Date	Time	Round
Sunday, 28 July 2024	12:50	Heats
Tuesday, 30 July 2024	11:40	Repechage
Thursday, 1 August 2024	11:06	Final

== Rowers per team ==
Number	Rowers	Nation
1	Fergus Hamilton; Alexander Hill; Timothy Masters; Jack Robertson	Australia
2	Benoît Brunet; Teo Rayet; Guillaume Turlan; Thibaud Turlan	France
3	Matt Aldridge; David Ambler; Freddie Davidson; Oliver Wilkes	Great Britain
4	Giovanni Abagnale; Nicholas Kohl; Matteo Lodo; Giuseppe Vicino	Italy
5	Eli Brouwer; Guus Mollee; Nelson Ritsema; Rik Rienks	Netherlands
6	Bogdan-Sabin Baitoc; Alexandru-Laurențiu Danciu; Andrei Mândrilă; Ciprian Tudosă	Romania
7	Matt Macdonald; Oliver Maclean; Tom Murray; Logan Ullrich	New Zealand
8	Patrick Brunner; Tim Roth; Kai Schätzle; Joel Schürch	Switzerland
9	Justin Best; Liam Corrigan; Michael Grady; Nick Mead	United States

== Results ==
=== Heats ===
The first two of each heat qualify for Final A, while the remainder go to the repechage phase in a second bid to qualify for the final.

==== Heat 1 ====
Rank	Lane	Nation	Time	Notes
1	1	New Zealand	6:03.08	FA
2	5	Great Britain	6:05.63	FA
3	3	Romania	6:06.60	R
4	2	Netherlands	6:08.75	R
5	4	Italy	6:14.65	R

==== Heat 2 ====
Rank	Lane	Nation	Time	Notes
1	1	United States	6:04.95	FA
2	5	Australia	6:06.84	FA
3	3	France	6:07.52	R
4	2	Switzerland	6:10.86	R

=== Repechage ===
The first two in repechage heat qualify for Final A and rest go to Final B.

==== Repechage Heat ====
Rank	Lane	Nation	Time	Notes
1	1	Italy	5:52.65	FA
2	4	Romania	5:53.52	FA
3	3	France	5:53.59	FB
4	2	Netherlands	5:56.86	FB
5	5	Switzerland	6:00.29	FB

=== Finals ===
==== Final B ====
Rank	Lane	Nation	Time	Notes
7	1	Netherlands	5:56.35	
8	2	France	5:57.78	
9	3	Switzerland	6:02.61	

==== Final A ====
Rank	Lane	Nation	Time	Notes
1st place, gold medalist(s)	3	United States	5:49.03	
2nd place, silver medalist(s)	4	New Zealand	5:49.88	
3rd place, bronze medalist(s)	2	Great Britain	5:52.42	
4	1	Italy	5:55.07	
5	6	Romania	5:56.85	
6	5	Australia	6:00.35	
