= Logan Ullrich =

New Zealand rower (born 2000)

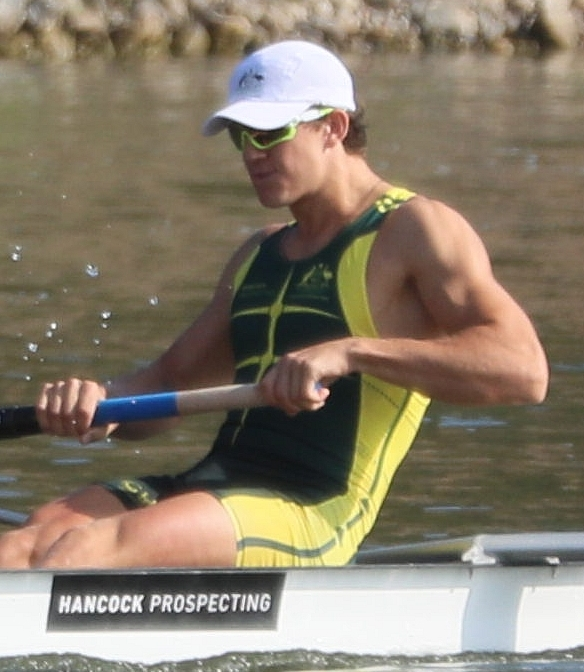
- Ullrich in 2018

Personal information
- Nationality: New Zealand
- Born: 20 August 2000 (age 26) Auckland, New Zealand
- Height: 189 cm (6 ft 2 in)

Sport
- Sport: Rowing
Medal record
Men's rowing
Representing New Zealand
Olympic Games
Silver medal – second place	2024 Paris	Coxless four

Logan Ullrich (born 20 August 2000) is a New Zealand rower.

== Early life ==
Ullrich was born on 20 August 2000. Cindy and Hilton Ullrich are his parents. He grew up in Brisbane, Australia, and attended Brisbane Grammar School. After his secondary school, he was head-hunted by the University of Washington for a sports scholarship. He majored in food systems, nutrition and health and graduated with a Bachelor of Arts in 2023.

== Rowing career ==
Aged 11, Ullrich was inspired by his father about rowing – both Ullrich's father and his uncle had rowed at school in their youth. When his school offered rowing the following year, Ullrich was keen to try it out and had a positive experience. In Brisbane, he rowed for his school and the Kand Rowing Club. In 2018, teamed up with Miller Eagle-Rowe in a coxless pair, they won the U19 national championship of Australia. They went to the 2018 World Junior Championships in Račice in the Czech Republic in a coxed four and won a bronze medal for Australia.

At the end of 2020, he first rowed in the Karapiro Club Regatta and then the Karapiro Christmas Regatta. In early 2021, he competed in the North Island Rowing Championships in Karapiro, and in February, he want to his first New Zealand Rowing Championships. In the U23, he competed in the coxless pairs and the single sculls and won gold and bronze, respectively. In the premier competition, he rowed with the eight and the coxless four and won silver in both those boat classes.

From 2021, Ullrich rowed for the University of Washington in their eight. The eight won the Head of the Charles Regatta that year.

For the 2023 international rowing season including that year's world championships, New Zealand's men's coxless four was made up of Ollie Maclean, Ullrich, Matt Macdonald, and Tom Murray. They are being coached by Mike Rodger and Malcom McIntyre. Macdonald and Murray had both been in the Tokyo New Zealand eight that won gold in 2021. Maclean and Ullrich had both rowed for their American universities the previous years.
