= Liam Corrigan =

American rower (born 1997)

- Corrigan in 2024

Personal information
- Born: September 11, 1997 (age 29) Old Lyme, Connecticut, U.S.
- Height: 1.96 m (6 ft 5 in)

Sport
- Sport: Rowing
Medal record
Olympic Games
Gold medal – first place	2024 Paris	Coxless four
World Championships
Silver medal – second place	2023 Belgrade	Coxless four

Liam Corrigan OLY (born September 11, 1997) is an American rower.

== Career ==
He competed in the men's eight event at the 2020 Summer Olympics for the United States, finishing the competition in 4th place. Corrigan was part of the winning Oxford team at the 2022 boat race.

At the 2024 Summer Olympics in Paris, Corrigan won a gold medal in the coxless men’s four.
