= Oliver Wilkes (rower) =

British rower (born 1995)

Oli Wilkes
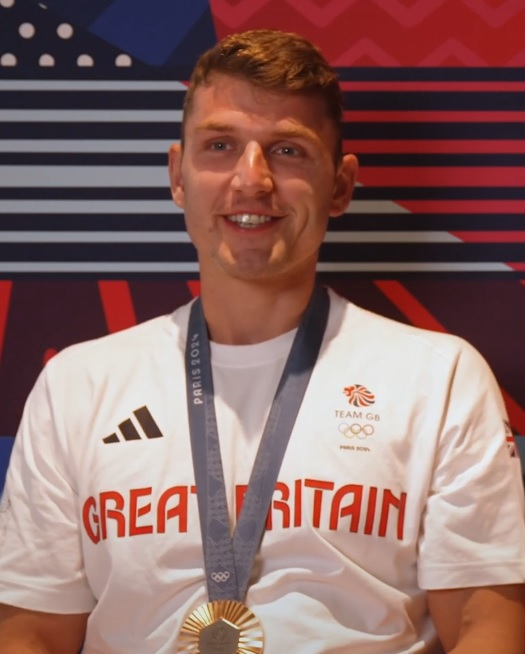
- Wilkes at the 2024 Summer Olympics

Personal information
- Full name: Oliver Wilkes
- Nationality: British (English)
- Born: 14 July 1995 (age 31)

Sport
- Country: Great Britain
- Sport: Rowing
- Event: Fours
- Club: Oxford Brookes University Boat Club
Medal record
Men's rowing
Representing Great Britain
Olympic Games
Bronze medal – third place	2024 Paris	Coxless four
World Championships
Gold medal – first place	2023 Belgrade	Coxless four
European Championships
Gold medal – first place	2023 Bled	Coxless four
Gold medal – first place	2024 Szeged	Coxless four

Oliver Wilkes (born 14 July 1995) is a British rower. He won a bronze at the 2024 Paris Olympics in the coxless four.

== Career ==
Wilkes learnt to row at the Liverpool University Boat Club while we was attending the University of Liverpool. Before moving and rowing at the University of Edinburgh.

Wilkes came to prominence after winning the silver medal in the coxed four, at the 2017 World Rowing U23 Championships in Plovdiv. Wilkes later won a gold medal at the 2023 European Rowing Championships.

At the 2023 World Rowing Championships in Belgrade, he won a World Championship gold medal in the men's coxless four. He won a bronze at the 2024 Paris Olympics in the coxless four.
