= David Ambler (rower) =

British rower (born 1997)

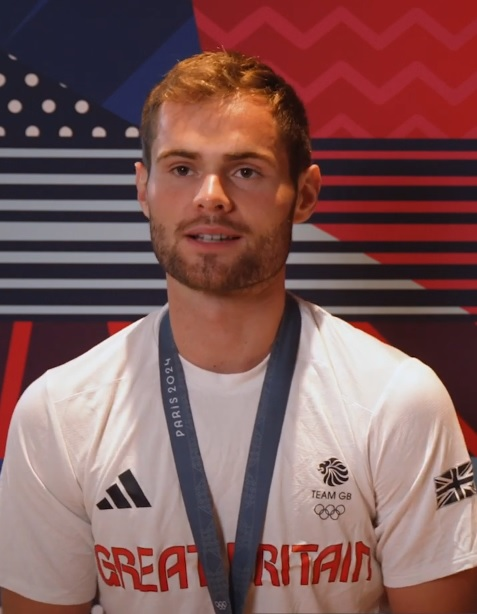
- Ambler at the 2024 Paris Olympics

Personal information
- Nationality: British
- Born: 4 December 1997 (age 28)

Sport
- Country: Great Britain
- Sport: Rowing
- Event: Eights
- Club: Oxford University Boat Club
Medal record
Men's rowing
Representing Great Britain
Olympic Games
Bronze medal – third place	2024 Paris	Coxless four
World Championships
Gold medal – first place	2022 Račice	Coxless four
Gold medal – first place	2023 Belgrade	Coxless four
European Championships
Gold medal – first place	2023 Bled	Coxless four
Gold medal – first place	2024 Szeged	Coxless four

David Ambler (born 4 December 1997) is a British rower.

== Career ==
He rowed for St Paul's School Boat Club and in the 2015 World Rowing Junior Championships represented Great Britain. While at Harvard University, he rowed in the Under 23 teams from 2017 to 2019.

In 2021, Ambler won the Grand Challenge Cup (the blue riband event at the Henley Royal Regatta) rowing for the Oxford Brookes University Boat Club. He became a world champion after winning the gold medal in the coxless four at the 2022 World Championships.

In 2023, he won the Stewards' Challenge Cup at the Henley Royal Regatta for the second time, rowing for the Oxford Brookes University Boat Club. Later that year, he won a second successive World Championship gold medal in the men's coxless four, at the 2023 World Rowing Championships in Belgrade.
