= Matt Aldridge =

British rower (born 1996)

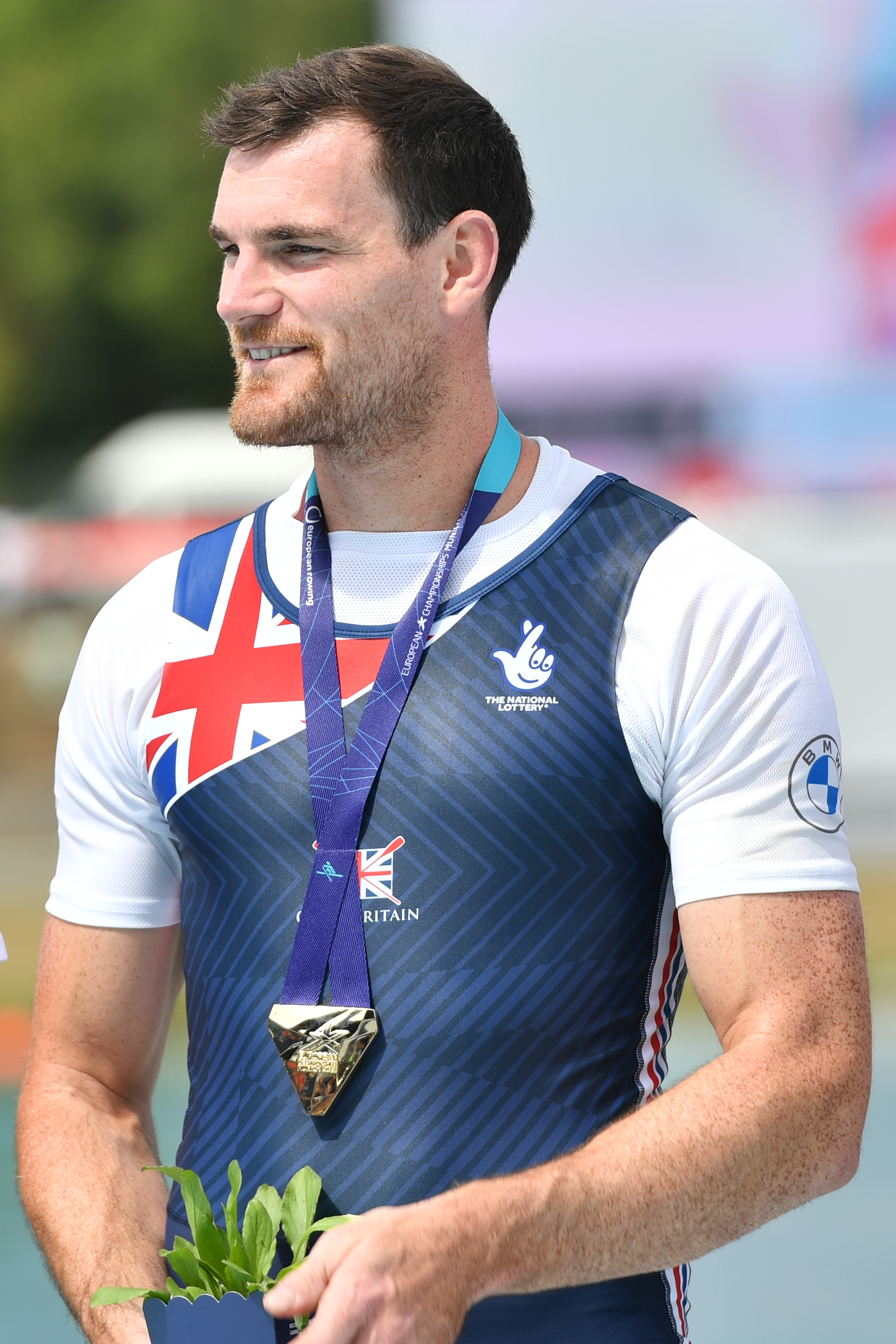
- Aldridge in Oberschleißheim, 2022

Personal information
- Full name: Matthew Aldridge
- Nationality: British
- Born: 11 March 1996 (age 30)

Sport
- Country: Great Britain
- Sport: Rowing
- Event: Fours
- Club: Oxford Brookes University Boat Club
Medal record
Men's rowing
Representing Great Britain
Olympic Games
Bronze medal – third place	2024 Paris	Coxless four
World Championships
Gold medal – first place	2023 Belgrade	Coxless four
Silver medal – second place	2025 Shanghai	Eight
European Championships
Gold medal – first place	2022 Oberschleißheim	Coxless four
Gold medal – first place	2023 Bled	Coxless four
Gold medal – first place	2024 Szeged	Coxless four
Gold medal – first place	2025 Plovdiv	Eight

Matt Aldridge (born 11 March 1996) is a British sweep-rower who stroked the men's coxless four to consecutive European and world titles in 2022 and 2023 and won an Olympic bronze medal at the 2024 Summer Olympics.

== Early life and education ==
Aldridge was raised in Christchurch, Dorset, where his father, Steve, coached at the local rowing club; watching sessions from the river-bank inspired him to join Christchurch Rowing Club.

After secondary school he studied sport and exercise science at Oxford Brookes University and rowed for the Oxford Brookes University Boat Club, a programme that regularly supplies athletes to the GB senior squad.

== Career ==
Graduating from the GB under-23 system, Aldridge joined Oliver Wilkes, David Ambler and Freddie Davidson in the senior coxless four for 2022. The quartet won gold at the 2022 European Rowing Championships in Munich, Britain’s first men’s four continental title since 2016. Aldridge contracted COVID-19 weeks later and missed the final of the 2022 World Rowing Championships in Račice, yet the crew took the world title.

In 2023, he won the Stewards' Challenge Cup at the Henley Royal Regatta, rowing for the Oxford Brookes University Boat Club. Later that year, he won a World Championship gold medal in the men's coxless four, at the 2023 World Rowing Championships in Belgrade.

Aldridge made his Olympic debut on 1 August 2024 at Vaires-sur-Marne. After a tactical middle thousand the British four surged to third behind the United States and the Netherlands, earning Britain’s first men’s four Olympic medal since 2016.
