= Michael Grady =

American rower (born 1996)

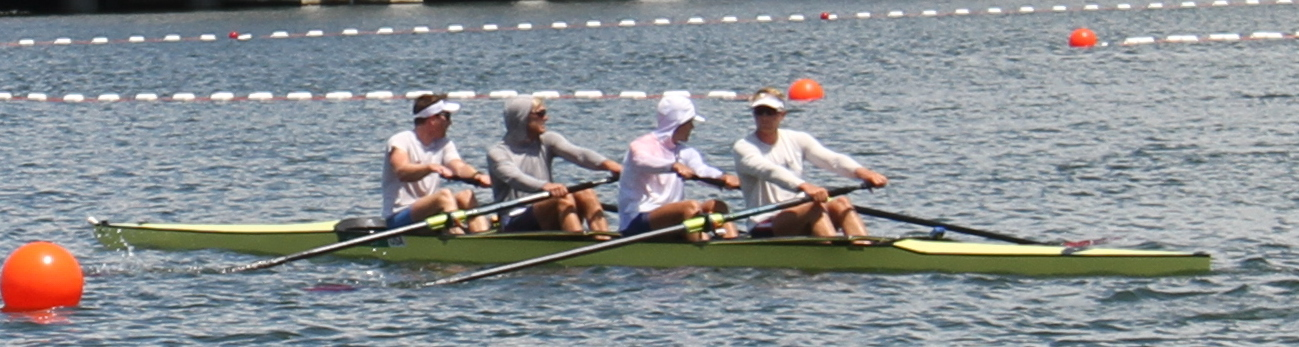
- Grady (3 seat) at the 2020 Summer Olympics

Personal information
- Born: October 22, 1996 (age 29) Pittsburgh, Pennsylvania U.S.
- Height: 1.98 m (6 ft 6 in)
- Weight: 91 kg (201 lb)

Sport
- Sport: Rowing

Achievements and titles
- Olympic finals: Tokyo 2020 M4-
Medal record
Men's rowing
Representing United States
Olympic Games
Gold medal – first place	2024 Paris	Coxless four
World Championships
Silver medal – second place	2023 Belgrade	Coxless four

Michael Grady (born October 22, 1996) is an American rower. He competed in the 2020 Summer Olympics. At the 2024 Summer Olympics in Paris, Grady won a gold medal in the coxless men’s four.
