= Justin Best =

American rower (born 1997)

Personal information
- Born: August 17, 1997 (age 28) Kennett Square, Pennsylvania, U.S.
- Education: Drexel University
- Height: 1.93 m (6 ft 4 in)

Sport
- Sport: Rowing
Medal record
Men's rowing
Representing United States
Olympic Games
Gold medal – first place	2024 Paris	Coxless four
World Championships
Silver medal – second place	2023 Belgrade	Coxless four
World U23 Championships
Gold medal – first place	2018 Poznań	Eight
Silver medal – second place	2019 Sarasota	Eight
World Junior Championships
Silver medal – second place	2015 Rio de Janeiro	Eight

Justin Best (born August 17, 1997) is an American rower. He competed in the men's eight event at the 2020 Summer Olympics. At the 2024 Summer Olympics in Paris, Best won a gold medal in the men's coxless four.

When he was in middle school, Best suffered a concussion playing football that caused him to reconsider his athletic activities. After seeing The Social Network, his parents were inspired by the Harvard rowing team scenes and he started rowing for the Newport Rowing Club in Newport, Delaware. He continued rowing while at Unionville High School in Kennett Square, Pennsylvania, where he was part of an effort to petition the local school board to add rowing as a club sport. In 2015, he was part of the men's eight that won a silver medal at the World Rowing Junior Championships.

Best attended Drexel University, where he studied business and engineering. While competing for the Drexel Dragons, they won the Dad Vail Regatta team title all four years. During his time at Drexel he also competed for the US National U23 squad in 2018 and 2019. After graduating from Drexel, he worked as an analyst at investment bank Union Square Advisors.
