= Freddie Davidson =

British rower (born 1998)

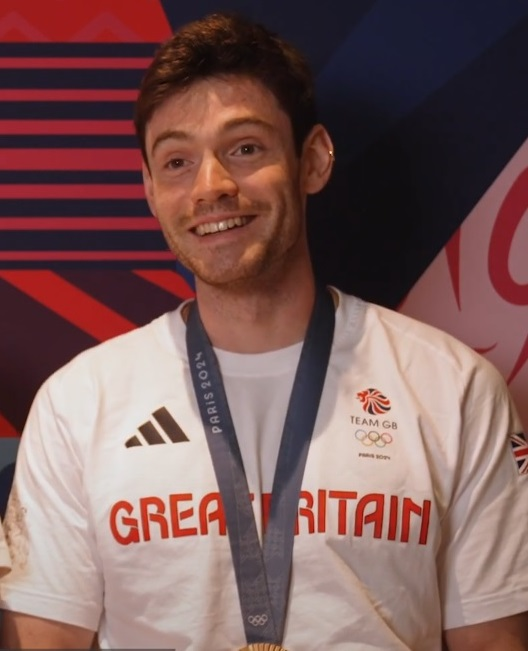
- Davidson at the 2024 Summer Olympics

Personal information
- Full name: Frederick Davidson
- Nationality: British
- Born: 26 May 1998 (age 28)
- Education: Emmanuel College, Cambridge, St Paul's School, London

Sport
- Country: Great Britain
- Sport: Rowing
- Event: Fours/Eights
- Club: Oxford Brookes University Boat Club, Cambridge University Boat Club
Medal record
Men's rowing
Representing Great Britain
Olympic Games
Bronze medal – third place	2024 Paris	Coxless four
World Championships
Gold medal – first place	2022 Račice	Coxless four
Gold medal – first place	2023 Belgrade	Coxless four
European Championships
Gold medal – first place	2022 Oberschleißheim	Coxless four
Gold medal – first place	2023 Bled	Coxless four
Gold medal – first place	2024 Szeged	Coxless four

Frederick Davidson (born 26 May 1998) is a British representative rower. He is a two-time world champion with his titles being won in 2022 and 2023 in the men's coxless four.

== University and club rowing ==
Davidson was educated at St Paul's School, London and took up rowing at the St Paul's School Boat Club. While at Cambridge University he was selected in the Cambridge senior eight for the boat races of 2017, 2018 and 2019. He rowed in those Cambridge victories of 2018 (at stroke) and 2019 (in the seven seat). He was selected, as president, in the 2020 Cambridge eight but no race was held that year.

In 2021, Davidson won the Grand Challenge Cup (the blue riband event at the Henley Royal Regatta) rowing for the Oxford Brookes University Boat Club.

In 2023, he won the Stewards' Challenge Cup at the Henley Royal Regatta, rowing in a coxless four for the Oxford Brookes University Boat Club.

== Representative rowing career ==
Davidson was first selected to represent Great Britain in a junior men's eight for the 2015 Junior World Rowing Championships. They placed fifth. The following year when selected in for the 2016 Junior World Championships, Davidson stroked the British coxless four to a silver medal.

From 2017 Davidson made three appearances at U23 World Rowing Championships. He stroked a pair in 2017 which finished sixth, the men's eight in 2018 which won a silver medal and was seated at three in 2019 in the coxless four which won gold and an U23 world championship title.

In 2021 Davidson moved into the senior squad but only made one representative appearance in the coxless four at World Rowing Cup III. 2022 however was a stellar year for Davidson. He secured the stroke seat of the British coxless four. They won gold at two World Rowing Cups, then the European title at the 2022 European Rowing Championships. before winning his first world championship title at the 2022 World Championships.

In 2023, he won a second successive World Championship gold medal in the men's coxless four, at the 2023 World Rowing Championships in Belgrade after again dominating throughout the 2023 European racing season.

== Family ==
His grandfather Alastair Davidson won silver and bronze medals at the 1954 British Empire and Commonwealth Games.
