= Luc Daffarn =

South African rower (born 1998)

Personal information
- Nationality: South Africa
- Born: 31 January 1998 (age 27) Johannesburg, South Africa
- Height: 198 cm (6 ft 6 in)
- Weight: 54 kg (119 lb)

Sport
- Sport: Rowing

Luc Daffarn (born 31 January 1998) is a South African rower. He competed in the 2020 Summer Olympics.
