= Ralf Rienks =

Dutch rower (born 1997)

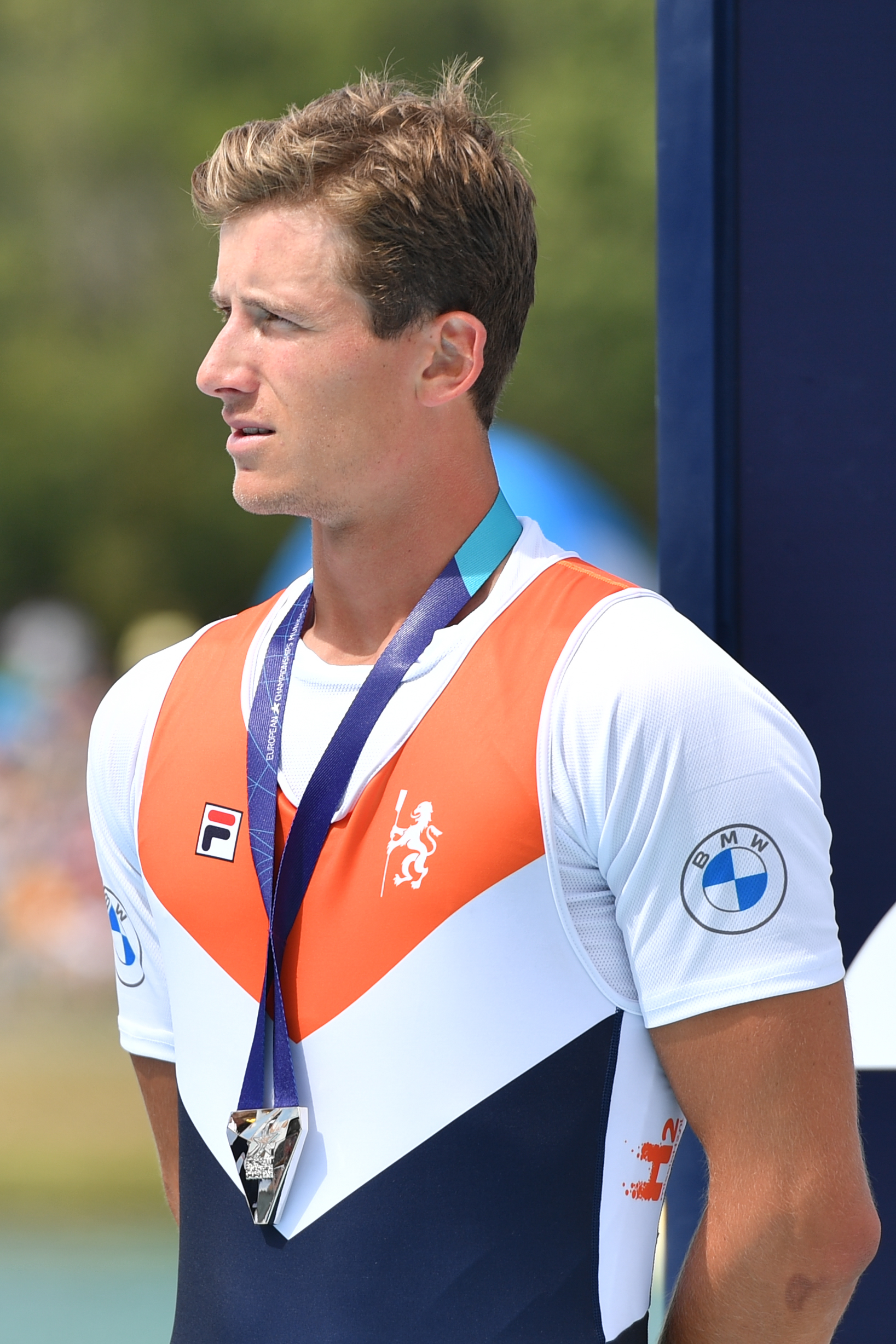
- Rienks at the 2022 European Championships in Munich

Personal information
- Born: 23 September 1997 (age 28)
- Parents: Nico Rienks, Harriet van Ettekoven

Sport
- Country: Netherlands
- Sport: Rowing
Medal record
Men's rowing
Representing the Netherlands
Olympic Games
Silver medal – second place	2024 Paris	Eight
World Championships
Gold medal – first place	2026 Amsterdam	Eight
Bronze medal – third place	2022 Racice	M4-
European Championships
Bronze medal – third place	2023 Bled	Eight
Silver medal – second place	2022 Munich	M4-

Ralf Rienks (born 23 September 1997) is a Dutch rower. He won a silver medal in the men's eight at the 2024 Summer Olympics.

== Career ==
He made his international debut for the Netherlands in 2021. He won a silver medal in the coxless four at the 2022 European Rowing Championships in Munich. He won a bronze medal at the 2022 World Rowing Championships in the men's coxless four in the Czech Republic.

He won a bronze medal in the men's eight at the 2023 European Rowing Championships in Bled, Slovenia.

He won a silver medal in the men's eight at the 2024 Summer Olympics in Paris.

== Personal life ==
He is from a rowing family. His father Nico Rienks won gold at the 1988 and 1996 Olympic Games. His mother Harriet van Ettekoven won bronze at the 1984 Olympic Games. His brother Rik Rienks is also a rower.
