= Ollie Maclean =

New Zealand rower (born 1998)

Ollie Maclean OLY
Personal information
- Full name: Oliver Maclean
- Nationality: New Zealand
- Born: 19 May 1998 (age 28) Glasgow, Scotland
- Height: 191 cm (6 ft 3 in)

Sport
- Country: New Zealand
- Sport: Rowing
Medal record
Men's rowing
Representing New Zealand
Olympic Games
Silver medal – second place	2024 Paris	Coxless four

Oliver Maclean (born 19 May 1998) is a New Zealand rower. He competed in the men's coxless four event at the 2024 Summer Olympics, where he won a silver medal with the New Zealand team.
