= Matt Macdonald =

New Zealand rower (born 1999)

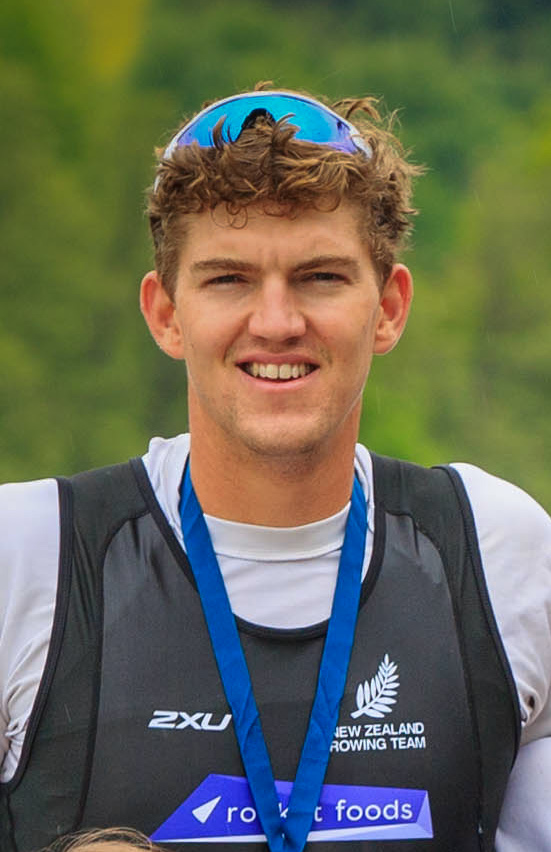
- Macdonald in 2021

Personal information
- Full name: Matthew Macdonald
- Born: 15 March 1999 (age 27) Auckland, New Zealand
- Height: 1.98 m (6 ft 6 in)

Sport
- Country: New Zealand
- Sport: Rowing
Medal record
Men's rowing
Representing New Zealand
Olympic Games
Gold medal – first place	2020 Tokyo	Eight
Silver medal – second place	2024 Paris	Coxless four
World Championships
Bronze medal – third place	2023 Belgrade	Coxless four

Matthew Macdonald (born 15 March 1999) is a New Zealand rower. He won a gold medal in the men's eight event at the 2020 Summer Olympics.

== Career ==
Prior to the 2020 Olympic Games, he finished second in the men's coxless four at the 2017 Junior World Rowing Championships; third in the same boat class at the 2018 Under-23 World Rowing Championships; fifteenth in the same boat class at the 2018 World Rowing Championships; and 6th in the men's eight at the 2019 World Rowing Championships. He is from Auckland, New Zealand and began rowing at Auckland Grammar School. He has also represented Auckland Rowing Club and North Shore Rowing Club. He lives in Cambridge and is studying for a Bachelor of Sport and Recreation at Massey University.
