= Nick Mead (rower) =

American rower (born 1995)

Personal information
- Born: March 12, 1995 (age 31) Strafford, Pennsylvania, U.S.
- Height: 1.98 m (6 ft 6 in)
- Weight: 97 kg (214 lb)

Sport
- Sport: Rowing
Medal record
Men's rowing
Representing United States
Olympic Games
Gold medal – first place	2024 Paris	Coxless four
World Championships
Silver medal – second place	2017 Sarasota	Eight
Silver medal – second place	2023 Belgrade	Coxless four

Nick Mead (born March 12, 1995) is an American rower. He rowed for Princeton University, from which he graduated in 2017.

Mead competed in the men's eight event at the 2020 Summer Olympics. At the 2024 Summer Olympics in Paris, Mead won a gold medal in the coxless men's four, the first for an American team since 1960. He carried the US flag at the closing ceremonies alongside swimmer Katie Ledecky. Mead is the nephew of American foreign policy expert Walter Russell Mead.
