= Ruben Knab =

Dutch rower (born 1988)

Personal information
- Nationality: Dutch
- Born: 19 February 1988 (age 38) Ede, Netherlands
- Height: 1.93 m (6 ft 4 in)
- Weight: 98 kg (216 lb)

Sport
- Country: Netherlands
- Sport: Rowing
- Event: Eight

Achievements and titles
- Olympic finals: London 2012 M4- Tokyo 2020 M8+
Medal record
Men's rowing
Representing the Netherlands
Olympic Games
| Silver medal – second place | 2024 Paris | Eight |
World Championships
| Silver medal – second place | 2019 Ottensheim | Eight |
| Bronze medal – third place | 2022 Račice | Coxless four |
European Championships
| Silver medal – second place | 2018 Glasgow | Eight |
| Silver medal – second place | 2022 Munich | Coxless four |
| Bronze medal – third place | 2013 Seville | Eight |
| Bronze medal – third place | 2017 Račice | Eight |
| Bronze medal – third place | 2019 Lucerne | Eight |
| Bronze medal – third place | 2020 Poznań | Eight |
| Bronze medal – third place | 2021 Varese | Eight |
| Bronze medal – third place | 2023 Bled | Eight |

Ruben Knab (born 19 February 1988) is a Dutch representative two-time Olympian rower. He finished fifth in the coxless four at the 2012 Summer Olympics and again finished fifth and at Tokyo 2020 in Dutch heavyweight men's eight.

He won a medal at the 2019 World Rowing Championships. At Tokyo 2020 the Dutch men's eight won their heat, then finished 5th in the A final for an overall fifth placing at the Olympic regatta.
