= Thibaud Turlan =

French rower (born 1996)

Personal information
- Born: 18 October 1996 (age 30) Bordeaux, France
- Height: 1.94 m (6 ft 4 in)
- Weight: 88 kg (194 lb)

Sport
- Country: France
- Sport: Rowing
- Events: Coxless pair, Coxless four
- Club: Aviron Grenoblois
Medal record
European Championships
| Bronze medal – third place | 2023 Bled | Coxless four |
| Bronze medal – third place | 2024 Szeged | Coxless four |

Thibaud Turlan (born 18 October 1996) is a French rower. He competed in the 2020 Summer Olympics and 2024 Summer Olympics with his twin brother Guillaume.
