= Joel Schürch =

Swiss rower

Personal information
- Nationality: Swiss
- Born: 30 September 1994 (age 30)
- Height: 1.87 m (6 ft 2 in)

Sport
- Country: Switzerland
- Sport: Rowing

Joel Schürch (born 30 September 1994) is a Swiss rower. He competed in the 2020 Summer Olympics, held July–August 2021 in Tokyo.
