= 2023 Sailing World Championships – 49er FX =

49er FX at the 2023 Sailing World Championships
- Venue: The Hague, the Netherlands
- Dates: 11–18 August
- Competitors: 116 from 29 nations

Medalists
gold medal	Vilma Bobeck; Rebecca Netzler	Sweden
silver medal	Odile van Aanholt; Annette Duetz	Netherlands
bronze medal	Olivia Price; Evie Haseldine	Australia

The 49er FX competition at the 2023 Sailing World Championships was the women's skiff event and was held in The Hague, the Netherlands, 11–18 August 2023. The entries were limited to 70 boats. The competitors participated in an opening series that was planned to 15 races, followed by a medal race. The medal race was planned for 18 August.

The competition served as a qualifying event for the 2024 Olympic sailing competition with 10 out of 20 national quota being distributed at the event.

== Summary ==
The entry list included Dutch back-to-back world champions Odile van Aanholt and Annette Duetz. van Aanholt and Duetz had also won the Paris 2024 Test Event the month before. The Netherlands duo however suffered from an injury going in to the competition. In the Sailing World Cup, Martine Grael and Kahena Kunze of Brazil had won the Trofeo Princesa Sofía, van Aanholt & Duetz had won the Semaine Olympique Française, and Marla Bergmann and Hanna Wille of Germany had won the Kiel Week.

After the first day of racing, two races being held, three teams had three points; Swedish duo Vilma Bobeck and Rebecca Netzler; Isaura Maenhaut and Anouk Geurts of Belgium; and Australian pair Olivia Price and Evie Haseldine. Swedish team continued with race wins and had six wins and three other podiums out of nine races. During Tuesday 15 August, after twelve races, Bobeck and Netzler increased their lead to 35 points in decreasing and shifty condition.

Further competition led to that Bobeck and Netzler won the gold with one day to spare. With no wind on the day of the medal race, standings were confirmed with Bobeck and Netzler as champions, van Aanholt and Duetz as silver medallists and Price and Haseldine to take the bronze medals.

With the final results, national quotas were awarded Sweden, the Netherlands, Australia, Belgium, Great Britain, New Zealand, the United States, Norway, Spain and Denmark.

== Results ==
Results of individual races
Pos	Crew	Country	I	II	III	IV	V	VI	VII	VIII	IX	X	XI	XII	XIII	XIV	XV	Tot	Pts
Gold medal	Vilma Bobeck; Rebecca Netzler	Sweden	2	3	1	1	1	1	1	3	1	2	3	19	BFD 26^{†}	1	9	74	48
Silver medal	Odile van Aanholt; Annette Duetz	Netherlands	3	10	7	1	10	DSQ 30^{†}	1	1	8	7	11	9	2	2	12	114	84
Bronze medal	Olivia Price; Evie Haseldine	Australia	1	4	2	3	2	5	3	10	9	3	12	23^{†}	4	10	20	111	88
4	Isaura Maenhaut; Anouk Geurts	Belgium	2	2	1	12	6	1	4	8	2	20	21^{†}	16	1	5	19	120	99
5	Freya Black; Saskia Tidey	Great Britain	9	2	3	10	11	2	6	2	2	8	6	20	16	4	24^{†}	125	101
6	Jo Aleh; Molly Meech	New Zealand	4	7	3	13	5	2	12	1	10	15	10	11	6	18^{†}	7	124	106
7	Stephanie Roble; Maggie Shea	United States	1	6	8	14	1	7	2	2	16	9	4	1	BFD 26^{†}	20	17	134	108
8	Pia Dahl Andersen; Nora Edland	Norway	4	7	5	7	7	26^{†}	6	3	5	6	16	7	7	23	6	135	109
9	Támara Echegoyen; Paula Barceló	Spain	6	11	7	3	2	4	11	7	4	12	RET 26^{†}	13	9	6	23	144	118
10	Johanne Schmidt; Andrea Schmidt	Denmark	6	1	11	2	9	8	12	4	17	4	18	15	10	8	25^{†}	150	125
11	Ronja Grönblom; Veera Hokka	Finland	10	8	5	9	5	10	17	11	12	14	1	5	BFD 26^{†}	3	18	154	128
12	Martine Grael; Kahena Kunze	Brazil	11	10	17	4	3	10	4	27	DSQ 30^{†}	1	9	6	12	14	4	162	132
13	Georgia Lewin-LaFrance; Antonia Lewin-LaFrance	Canada	8	UFD 31^{†}	2	6	8	9	11	21	3	24	15	2	15	7	2	164	133
14	Helene Næss; Marie Rønningen	Norway	7	4	6	6	9	11	7	6	15	19	2	21	BFD 26^{†}	13	8	160	134
15	Jana Germani; Giorgia Bertuzzi	Italy	17^{†}	6	12	13	7	3	17	7	12	16	7	4	8	12	14	155	138
16	Paris Henken; Anna Tobias	United States	3	13	20	4	8	8	7	6	6	13	19	14	BFD 26^{†}	9	10	166	140
17	Hu Xiaoyu; Shan Mengyuan	China	7	17	15	7	3	STP 18	20^{†}	13	4	10	8	8	13	16	3	162	142
18	Alexandra Stalder; Silvia Speri	Italy	5	23	4	DSQ 30^{†}	4	6	8	12	7	25	5	10	3	DNF 26	5	173	143
19	Marla Bergmann; Hanna Wille	Germany	24	5	4	2	12	5	13	5	6	11	13	UFD 26^{†}	14	RET 26	13	179	153
20	Laura Harding; Annie Wilmot	Australia	9	19	14	5	6	18	18	4	14	5	24^{†}	3	11	22	21	193	169
21	Alicia Fras; Elena Barrio	Spain	STP 6	9	10	20	22	3	26^{†}	11	10	23	23	22	5	11	1	202	176
22	Aleksandra Melzacka; Sandra Jankowiak	Poland	8	5	6	23	11	13	15	17	3	17	14	18	BFD 26^{†}	19	11	206	180
23	Inga-Marie Hofmann; Catherine Bartelheimer	Germany	10	1	16	11	4	7	5	10	21	18	22	24	BFD 26^{†}	21	16	212	186
24	Moja Maru Scheel; Freya Feilcke	Germany	20	9	13	5	21	13	16	5	1	21	17	17	BFD 26^{†}	17	15	216	190
25	Lara Granier; Amelie Riou	France	11	22^{†}	16	8	10	STP 5	20	16	5	22	20	12	17	15	22	221	199
26	Misaki Tanaka; Sera Nagamatsu	Japan	13	15	11	20	15	STP 17	22^{†}	20	15	5	4	12	2	5	1	177	155
27	Megan Brickwood; Stephanie Orton	Great Britain	14	18^{†}	10	11	14	9	9	18	18	14	5	9	14	8	8	179	161
28	Sarah Steyaert; Charline Picon	France	18	8	19	18	16	19	19	8	8	18	2	4	3	1	BFD 34^{†}	195	161
29	Mathilde Lovadina; Aude Compan	France	15	12	13	12	17	17	14	9	14	4	19	1	20	21^{†}	2	190	169
30	Carlotta Omari; Sveva Carraro	Italy	12	21	23^{†}	9	15	12	23	18	22	8	9	7	6	7	15	207	184
31	María Sol Branz; Cecilia Carranza	Argentina	14	17	14	22	19	24	5	26	13	12	3	5	1	10	BFD 34^{†}	219	185
32	Antonia Schultheis; Victoria Schultheis	Malta	18	25	28	15	13	11	21	15	11	2	1	2	7	16	BFD 34^{†}	219	185
33	Anna Yamazaki; Sena Takano	Japan	15	11	19	16	18	14	10	23^{†}	19	19	7	14	5	15	10	215	192
34	Mina Ferguson; Dervla Duggan	Australia	12	3	20	10	14	6	24	RET 30^{†}	20	17	27	6	10	23	5	227	197
35	Sofia Giunchiglia; Giulia Schio	Italy	17	16	9	18	16	16	9	23	25^{†}	7	17	10	12	14	16	225	200
36	Chen Shasha; Wang Mengting	China	19	15	17	17	13	28	28	9	7	15	13	13	11	2	BFD 34^{†}	241	207
37	Eleanor Keers; Jessica Jobson	Great Britain	13	13	8	14	21	15	3	24	18	26	14	30^{†}	18	11	12	240	210
38	Natasha Bryant; Madeleine McLeay	Australia	28^{†}	22	18	19	12	23	2	12	19	3	20	24	16	20	6	244	216
39	Rebekka Johannesen; Iben Nielsby Christensen	Denmark	27^{†}	16	23	27	25	21	22	15	13	1	6	8	17	9	14	244	217
40	Charlotte Henkel; Carolina Horlbeck	Germany	19	20	12	19	27^{†}	18	14	22	9	21	15	3	15	22	11	247	220
41	Kimberly Lim; Cecilia Low	Singapore	23	21	18	RET 30^{†}	DNC 30	20	16	19	16	6	12	22	8	4	13	258	228
42	Josefine Nøjgaard; Esther Bojsen-Møller	Denmark	22	23	15	DSQ 30^{†}	22	20	8	13	17	22	16	21	9	12	9	259	229
43	Manon Peyre; Clara-Sofia Stamminger de Moura	France	23	18	21	21	17	21	15	24	20	13	29^{†}	16	19	6	20	283	254
44	Anđela De Micheli Vitturi; Mihaela De Micheli Vitturi	Croatia	20	19	27	8	19	12	19	22	UFD 30^{†}	11	23	11	22	27	RDG 19.3	289.3	259.3
45	Julia Henriksson; Klara Johansson	Sweden	25	24	24	15	26^{†}	22	24	14	26	16	11	15	13	17	18	290	264
46	Josephine Frederiksen; Laura Zeeberg	Denmark	24	12	24	24	20	15	13	29	UFD 30	9	18	BFD 34^{†}	26	13	23	314	280
47	Helen Pais; Helen Ausman	Estonia	25	26	25	16	20	14	21	14	24	27	26	31^{†}	21	31	4	325	294
48	Courtney Reynolds-Smith; Brianna Reynolds-Smith	New Zealand	21	14	25	24	23	22	23	28	22	23	24	19	25	30^{†}	3	326	296
49	Marlies Schouten; Maud Lodewijk	Netherlands	26	20	22	25	23	23	18	27	27	25	32^{†}	18	28	26	7	347	315
50	Zofia Burska; Sára Tkadlecová	Czech Republic	16	25	28	21	24	27	25	25	21	BFD 34^{†}	21	23	23	19	17	349	315
51	Gabriela Czapska; Hanna Rajchert	Poland	16	14	9	17	18	19	10	20	23	DNC 34^{†}	DNC 34	DNC 34	DNC 34	DNS 34	DNS 34	350	316
52	Erin McIlwaine; Ellie Cunnane	Ireland	21	24	21	27	25	25	26	28	26	30^{†}	30	25	4	24	19	355	325
53	Noya Bar Am; Saar Tamir	Israel	STP 27	28	22	26	29	26	29	16	24	29	8	20	24	UFD 34^{†}	22	364	330
54	Sandy Choi; Maddalena Di Salvo	Hong Kong	28	27	27	22	24	24	25	21	11	BFD 34^{†}	10	26	27	28	BFD 34	368	334
55	Klara Utterström; Ebba Berntsson	Sweden	22	28	26	26	26	25	28	17	23	20	31	28	UFD 34^{†}	3	RET 34	371	337
56	Diana Tudela; Adriana Barrón	Peru	STP 28	26	29	23	28	STP 28	29	26	28	28	25	17	30^{†}	25	21	391	361
57	Manase Ichihashi; Rinko Goto	Japan	30	DNF 31	30	25	27	28	27	25	27	10	22	27	31	29	BFD 34^{†}	403	369
58	Vera ter Horst; Jorien Hin	Netherlands	29	27	26	DNF 30	DNC 30	DNC 30	27	19	25	24	28	29	29	18	BFD 34^{†}	405	371

Scoring system: low-point system; Source:
Legend: BFD – Black flag disqualification; DNC – Did not come to the starting area; DNF – Did not finish; DNS – Did not start; DSQ – Disqualified; RDG – Redress given; RET – Retired; STP – Standard penalty imposed; UFD – "U" flag disqualification; † – Discarded race not counted in the overall result;
