= 49er & 49er FX European Championships =

International sailing competition

49er & 49er FX European Championships are annual European Championship sailing regattas in the 49er and the 49er FX classes organised by the International 49er Class Association.

== Editions ==
Year	City	Country	Dates	Events	Athletes	Nations	Notes
1997	Weymouth	United Kingdom	4–7 September	1			
1998	Helsinki	Finland	1–9 August	1			
1999	Cascais	Portugal	8–12 October	1			
2000	Medemblik	Netherlands	5–12 June	1			
2001	Brest	France	10–16 May	1			
2002	Grimstad	Norway	27 July – 2 August	1			
2003	Laredo	Spain	13–19 July	1			
2004	Torbole	Italy	5–10 July	1			
2005	Vallensbæk	Denmark	8–14 August	1			
2006	Weymouth	United Kingdom	24–30 July	1			
2007	Marsala	Italy	9–16 September	1			
2008	Palma	Spain	22–30 March	1			
2009	Zadar	Croatia	29 August – 5 September	1			
2010	Sopot	Poland	1–10 July	1			
2011	Helsinki	Finland	30 June – 15 July	1			
2012	Riva del Garda	Italy	8–15 September	1			
2013	Aarhus	Denmark	29 June – 7 July	2			
2014	Helsinki	Finland	8–13 July	2			
2015	Porto	Portugal	6–12 July	2			
2016	Barcelona	Spain	11–16 April	2			
2017	Kiel	Germany	27 July – 4 August	2			
2018	Gdynia	Poland	8 July – 13 July	2			
2019	Weymouth	United Kingdom	13–19 May	2			
2020	Lake Attersee	Austria	28 September – 4 October	2	190	22	
2021	Thessaloniki	Greece	14–19 September	2	196	23	
2022	Aarhus	Denmark	5–10 July	2	320	30	
2023	Vilamoura	Portugal	8–13 November	2	292	33	
2024	La Grande-Motte	France	7–12 May	2	194	29	
2025	Thessaloniki	Greece	3–8 June	2	168	30	
2026	Eckernförde	Germany	7–12 July	2	294	36	

== Medalists ==
=== 49er ===
Year	Gold	Silver	Bronze
2016 Barcelona			
2017 Kiel	Great Britain; Dylan Fletcher; Stuart Bithell	Great Britain; James Peters; Fynn Sterritt	Italy; Jacopo Plazzi; Andrea Tesei
2018 Gdynia	Spain; Diego Botín; Iago López	Poland; Dominik Buksak; Szymon Wierzbicki	Great Britain; Dylan Fletcher; Stuart Bithell
2019 Weymouth	Great Britain; Dylan Fletcher; Stuart Bithell	Great Britain; James Peters; Fynn Sterritt	Spain; Diego Botín; Iago López
2020 Lake Attersee	Germany; Tim Fischer; Fabian Graf	Austria; Benjamin Bildstein; David Hussl	Croatia; Šime Fantela; Mihovil Fantela
2021 Thessaloniki	Poland; Mikołaj Staniul; Jakub Sztorch	Germany; Tim Fischer; Fabian Graf	Poland; Łukasz Przybytek; Paweł Kołodziński
2022 Aarhus	Spain; Diego Botín; Florián Trittel	Netherlands; Bart Lambriex; Floris van de Werken	Great Britain; James Peters; Fynn Sterritt
2023 Vilamoura	France; Lucas Rual; Émile Amoros	Poland; Dominik Buksak; Szymon Wierzbicki	Austria; Benjamin Bildstein; David Hussl
2024 La Grande-Motte	Great Britain; James Peters; Fynn Sterritt	Switzerland; Sébastien Schneiter; Arno de Planta	Netherlands; Bart Lambriex; Floris van de Werken
2025 Thessaloniki	Spain; Martín Wizner; Jaime Wizner	Great Britain; William Pank; Thommie Grit	Israel; Tal Sade; Maor Abu
2026 Eckernförde	Great Britain; James Grummett; Rhos Hawes	Poland; Mikołaj Staniul; Jakub Sztorch	Germany; Richard Schultheis; Fabian Rieger

=== 49er FX ===
Year	Gold	Silver	Bronze
2016 Barcelona			
2017 Kiel	Germany; Tina Lutz; Susann Beucke	Great Britain; Charlotte Dobson; Saskia Tidey	Germany; Victoria Jurczok; Anika Lorenz
2018 Gdynia	Norway; Helene Næss; Marie Rønningen	Germany; Victoria Jurczok; Anika Lorenz	Great Britain; Sophie Weguelin; Sophie Ainsworth
2019 Weymouth	Netherlands; Annemiek Bekkering; Annette Duetz	Norway; Helene Næss; Marie Rønningen	Sweden; Vilma Bobeck; Malin Tengström
2020 Lake Attersee	Germany; Tina Lutz; Susann Beucke	Norway; Helene Næss; Marie Rønningen	Sweden; Julia Gross; Hanna Klinga
2021 Thessaloniki	Netherlands; Odile van Aanholt; Elise de Ruijter	Croatia; Enia Ninčević; Mihaela de Micheli Vitturi	Canada; Georgia Lewin-LaFrance; Antonia Lewin-LaFrance
2022 Aarhus	Netherlands; Odile van Aanholt; Annette Duetz	Sweden; Vilma Bobeck; Rebecca Netzler	Italy; Jana Germani; Giorgia Bertuzzi
2023 Vilamoura	Norway; Helene Næss; Marie Rønningen	Italy; Jana Germani; Giorgia Bertuzzi	Spain; Támara Echegoyen; Paula Barceló
2024 La Grande-Motte	Belgium; Isaura Maenhaut; Anouk Geurts	France; Sarah Steyaert; Charline Picon	Great Britain; Freya Black; Saskia Tidey
2025 Thessaloniki	Germany; Marla Bergmann; Hanna Wille	Poland; Aleksandra Melzacka; Sandra Jankowiak	Belgium; Isaura Maenhaut; Anouk Geurts
2026 Eckernförde	Germany; Marla Bergmann; Hanna Wille	France; Mathilde Lovadina; Lou Berthomieu	Poland; Aleksandra Melzacka; Sandra Jankowiak
