= 2014 ISAF Sailing World Championships – 49er FX =

49er FX at the 2014 ISAF Sailing World Championships
- Venue: Santander, Spain
- Dates: 16–21 September
- Competitors: 110 from 26 nations

Medalists
gold medal	Martine Soffiatti Grael; Kahena Kunze	Brazil
silver medal	Ida Marie Baad Nielsen; Marie Thusgaard Olsen	Denmark
bronze medal	Giulia Conti; Francesca Clapcich	Italy

The women's 49er FX class at the 2014 ISAF Sailing World Championships was held in Santander, Spain 16–21 September.

== Results ==
Results of individual races
Pos	Crew	Country	I	II	III	IV	V	VI	VII	VIII	IX	X	XI	XII	MR	Tot	Pts
Gold medal	Martine Grael; Kahena Kunze	Brazil	1	4	2	3	6	2	1	13^{†}	10	3	2	1	6	54	41
Silver medal	Ida Marie Baad Nielsen; Marie Thusgaard Olsen	Denmark	1	2	5	1	1	1	6	5	3	5	3	9^{†}	8	50	41
Bronze medal	Giulia Conti; Francesca Clapcich	Italy	4	6	2	4	11	13	7	2	1	4	18^{†}	3	14	89	71
4	Annemiek Bekkering; Annette Duetz	Netherlands	5	5	4	6	1	12	4	6	8	18^{†}	17	14	4	104	86
5	Victoria Jurczok; Anika Lorenz	Germany	BFD 29^{†}	2	21	3	19	4	9	3	13	9	4	2	2	120	91
6	Jena Hansen; Katja Salskov-Iversen	Denmark	6	3	3	8	8	8	13	8	12	21^{†}	8	6	18	122	101
7	Charlotte Dobson; Sophie Ainsworth	Great Britain	2	DSQ 29^{†}	1	2	3	21	5	10	16	15	9	8	16	137	108
8	Támara Echegoyen; Berta Betanzos	Spain	5	12	3	1	2	9	10	20	18	7	22^{†}	12	10	131	109
9	Lisa Ericson; Hanna Klinga	Sweden	10	11	20	12	7	DNF 26^{†}	19	25	4	1	1	4	12	152	126
10	Maiken Foght Schütt; Anne-Julie Schütt	Denmark	10	6	5	6	4	5	8	18	19	19	6	20^{†}	20	146	126
11	Tess Lloyd; Caitlin Elks	Australia	13	8	6	7	5	19	2	24^{†}	22	14	7	11	–	138	114
12	Alex Maloney; Molly Meech	New Zealand	3	8	11	15	2	14	14	7	11	24^{†}	12	19	–	140	116
13	Nina Keijzer; Claire Blom	Netherlands	11	9	6	10	9	7	11	16	2	22^{†}	20	17	–	140	118
14	Olivia Price; Eliza Solly	Australia	BFD 29^{†}	18	12	7	7	3	22	1	14	10	10	15	–	148	119
15	Tina Lutz; Susann Beucke	Germany	BFD 29^{†}	10	8	11	5	6	17	17	6	11	23	7	–	150	121
16	Leonie Meyer; Elena Christine Stoffers	Germany	12	1	16	16	10	10	3	4	9	16	24	25^{†}	–	146	121
17	Sarah Steyaert; Julie Bossard	France	20	DSQ 29^{†}	1	5	9	17	21	9	15	8	11	10	–	155	126
18	Frances Peters; Nicola Groves	Great Britain	7	11	7	16	4	20	16	21	STP 22^{†}	17	5	5	–	151	129
19	Kate MacGregor; Katrina Best	Great Britain	16	1	9	4	17	18	15	14	25^{†}	6	15	21	–	161	136
20	Sinem Kurtbay; Silja Kanerva	Finland	6	21^{†}	15	8	14	16	20	12	5	12	16	13	–	158	137
21	Tessa Parkinson; Chelsea Hall	Australia	3	17	22	2	3	15	12	23	7	25	DSQ 26^{†}	18	–	173	147
22	Laura Schöfegger; Elsa Lovrek	Austria	8	3	16	17	DNF 29^{†}	11	24	11	24	2	14	23	–	182	153
23	Aura Miquel; Silvia Roca	Spain	12	4	18	9	13	22	23^{†}	22	23	13	13	16	–	188	165
24	Andrea Brewster; Saskia Tidey	Ireland	16	10	14	5	6	DNF 26^{†}	25	19	20	20	19	22	–	202	176
25	Helene Næss; Marie Rønningen	Norway	9	5	23	17	8	DSQ 26^{†}	18	15	17	23	21	24	–	206	180
26	Julia Gross; Cecilia Jonsson	Sweden	11	12	18^{†}	14	13	1	1	1	10	–	–	–	–	81	63
27	Erin Rafuse; Dannie Boyd	Canada	2	19	DSQ 29^{†}	18	11	10	4	4	6	–	–	–	–	103	74
28	Noora Ruskola; Camilla Cedercreutz	Finland	BFD 29^{†}	7	14	13	16	7	3	14	3	–	–	–	–	106	77
29	Paris Henken; Helena Scutt	United States	20^{†}	19	10	10	19	4	11	6	1	–	–	–	–	100	80
30	Arielle Morgan; Heather Myatt	Canada	7	14	22^{†}	14	17	11	8	3	12	–	–	–	–	108	86
31	Griselda Khng; Sara Tan	Singapore	14	23^{†}	4	18	15	12	2	18	4	–	–	–	–	110	87
32	Victoria Travascio; María Sol Branz	Argentina	9	13	13	13	12	15	6	DSQ 31^{†}	22	–	–	–	–	134	103
33	Erin Berry; Ingrid Merry	Canada	21	17	25	DNF 29^{†}	14	9	5	2	11	–	–	–	–	133	104
34	Erica Dawson; Ellie Copeland	New Zealand	4	22	15	DNF 29^{†}	DNF 29	3	13	11	17	–	–	–	–	143	114
35	Maria Cantero Izquierdo; Hannah Barrios	Spain	8	15	19	11	20	2	10	DSQ 31^{†}	DNF 31	–	–	–	–	147	116
36	Juliana Senfft; Gabriela Nicolino	Brazil	17	24	12	15	12	18	RDG 13	DNF 31^{†}	8	–	–	–	–	150	119
37	Deborah Capozzi; Molly O'Bryan Vandemoer	United States	17	26^{†}	26	12	20	19	12	9	5	–	–	–	–	146	120
38	Kätlin Tammiste; Anna Maria Sepp	Estonia	DNF 29^{†}	14	8	20	16	14	15	12	21	–	–	–	–	149	120
39	Lili Sebesi; Violette Lemercier	France	19	24	13	20	10	8	18	DSQ 31^{†}	14	–	–	–	–	157	126
40	Fiona Testuz; Livia Naef	Switzerland	13	13	7	DNF 29^{†}	DNF 29	13	24	5	23	–	–	–	–	156	127
41	Victoria Payne; Stephanie Orton	Great Britain	24	20	17	DNF 29^{†}	DNF 29	5	14	8	18	–	–	–	–	164	135
42	Mayumi Roller; Kayla McComb	U.S. Virgin Islands	15	22	10	DNF 29^{†}	21	6	22	19	20	–	–	–	–	164	135
43	Clara Scheiwiller; Aude Compan	France	18	25	DNS 29	9	DNF 29	DNF 31^{†}	19	7	2	–	–	–	–	169	138
44	Kristen Lane; Maggie Shea	United States	BFD 29^{†}	27	19	19	22	16	7	13	16	–	–	–	–	168	139
45	Chika Hatae; Noriko Okuma	Japan	18	16	9	DNF 29	18	22	9	RET 31^{†}	19	–	–	–	–	171	140
46	Genevieve Tulloch; Kathleen Tocke	United States	22	25	DNF 29^{†}	19	18	17	16	15	9	–	–	–	–	170	141
47	Maria Ottavia Raggio; Paola Bergamaschi	Italy	15	23	11	DNF 29^{†}	DNF 29	20	20	10	15	–	–	–	–	172	143
48	Ewa Bartosiewicz; Marta Jackowska	Poland	19	18	DSQ 29^{†}	DNF 29	15	21	17	16	13	–	–	–	–	177	148
49	Giulia Genesio; Francesca Volpi	Italy	BFD 29	15	21	DNF 29	DNF 29	UFD 31^{†}	21	17	7	–	–	–	–	199	168
50	Jule Görge; Lotta Görge	Germany	23	7	20	DNC 29	DNC 29	DNC 31^{†}	DNC 31	DNC 31	DNC 31	–	–	–	–	232	201
51	Ragna Agerup; Maia Agerup	Norway	14	9	DNF 29	DNF 29	DNF 29	DNF 31^{†}	DNF 31	DNF 31	DNF 31	–	–	–	–	234	203
52	Paula Hoz; Lucia Fernández	Spain	22	20	24	DNF 29	DNF 29	DNS 31^{†}	25	DNF 31	DNF 31	–	–	–	–	242	211
53	Varsha Gautham; Aishwarya Chezhiyan	India	DSQ 29	16	17	DNF 29	DNF 29	DNC 31^{†}	DNC 31	DNF 31	DNC 31	–	–	–	–	244	213
54	Dominika Vaďurová; Simona Borosova	Slovakia	25	DNF 29	23	DNF 29	DNC 29	DNF 31^{†}	23	DNF 31	DNF 31	–	–	–	–	251	220
55	Dawn Xiaodan Liu; Joan Poh Xue Hua	Singapore	21	21	DNF 29	DNF 29	DNF 29	DNF 31^{†}	DNF 31	DNF 31	DNF 31	–	–	–	–	253	222

Scoring system: low-point system; Source:
Legend: – Qualified for medal race(s); BFD – Black flag disqualification; DNC – Did not come to the starting area; DNF – Did not finish; DNS – Did not start; DSQ – Disqualified; RDG – Redress given; RET – Retired; UFD – "U" flag disqualification; † – Discarded race not counted in the overall result;
