= Sailing at the 2024 Summer Olympics – 49er FX =

Women's 49erFX at the Games of the XXXIII Olympiad
- Venue: Marseille Marina
- Dates: 28 July – 2 August
- Competitors: 40 from 20 nations

Medalists
1st place, gold medalist(s)		Odile van Aanholt; Annette Duetz	Netherlands
2nd place, silver medalist(s)		Vilma Bobeck; Rebecca Netzler	Sweden
3rd place, bronze medalist(s)		Sarah Steyaert; Charline Picon	France

The Women 49er FX is a sailing event part of the Sailing at the 2024 Summer Olympics program in Marseille and takes place between 28 July – 2 August.

== Schedule ==
Sun 28 Jul	Mon 29 Jul	Tue 30 Jul	Wed 31 Jul	Fri 2 Aug
Race 1 Race 2 Race 3	Race 4 Race 5 Race 6	Race 7 Race 8 Race 9	Race 10; Race 11; Race 12	Medal race

== Results ==
Official results

Results of individual races
Pos	Crew	Country	I	II	III	IV	V	VI	VII	VIII	IX	X	XI	XII	MR	Tot	Pts
1st place, gold medalist(s)	Odile van Aanholt; Annette Duetz	Netherlands	5	1	1	10	8	5	19^{†}	3	2	15	4	14	6	93.0	74.0
2nd place, silver medalist(s)	Vilma Bobeck; Rebecca Netzler	Sweden	14	6	15	4	15	10	2	1	5	1	1	17^{†}	2	93.0	76.0
3rd place, bronze medalist(s)	Sarah Steyaert; Charline Picon	France	2	2	2	8	2	2	12	11	10	18^{†}	6	10	12	97.0	79.0
4	Helene Næss; Marie Rønningen	Norway	10	7	13	21^{†} BFD	5	9	5	5	7	2	5	8	16	113.0	92.0
5	Jana Germani; Giorgia Bertuzzi	Italy	12	9	9	1	3	6	17^{†}	17	16	12	3	3	4	112.0	95.0
6	Marla Bergmann; Hanna Wille	Germany	3	4	5	21^{†} BFD	16	7	11	8	8	3	14	5	14	119.0	98.0
7	Jo Aleh; Molly Meech	New Zealand	15	17	20^{†}	9	17	8	3	2	1	14	8	7	8	129.0	109.0
8	Martine Grael; Kahena Kunze	Brazil	13	5	6	21^{†} BFD	19	12	10	9	13	4	9	2	10	133.0	112.0
9	Olivia Price; Evie Haseldine	Australia	6	8	16	7	11	3	20^{†}	10	9	10	10	12	18	140.0	120.0
10	Stephanie Roble; Maggie Shea	United States	7	11	10	3	9	13	15	13	17^{†}	8	7	9	20	142.0	125.0
11	Georgia Lewin-LaFrance; Antonia Lewin-LaFrance	Canada	1	19	12	21^{†} BFD	1	18	6	6	11	5	13	15		128.0	107.0
12	Támara Echegoyen; Paula Barceló	Spain	19^{†}	15	14	12	4	17	13	7	4	16	11	1		133.0	114.0
13	Johanne Schmidt; Andrea Schmidt	Denmark	20	20	3	15	6	21^{†} RET	1	12	14	6	12	6		136.0	115.0
14	Isaura Maenhaut; Anouk Geurts	Belgium	17	18	11	5	7	4	4	18	6	7	20^{†}	18		135.0	115.0
15	Ronja Grönblom; Veera Hokka	Finland	8	14	18	13	10	1	8	4	21^{†} DSQ	11	16	13		137.0	116.0
16	Freya Black; Saskia Tidey	Great Britain	9	16	8	21^{†} BFD	14	19	9	14	3	9	15	4		141.0	120.0
17	Misaki Tanaka; Sera Nagamatsu	Japan	4	12	4	14	12	11	14	16	19^{†}	13	19	11		149.0	130.0
18	Aleksandra Melzacka; Sandra Jankowiak	Poland	18	3	19	11	18	14	7	21^{†} RET	12	21; RET	2	19		165.0	144.0
19	Zofia Burska; Sára Tkadlecová	Czech Republic	11	13	7	2	20^{†}	15	16	19	18	19	18	16		174.0	154.0
20	Hu Xiaoyu; Shan Mengyuan	China	16	10	17	6	13	16	18	15	15	17	17	21^{†} RET		181.0	160.0

Scoring system: low-point system;
Legend: – Qualified for medal race(s); BFD – Black flag disqualification; DSQ – Disqualified; RET – Retired; † – Discarded race not counted in the overall result;
