= 49er & 49er FX Junior World Championships =

International sailing regattas

The 49er & 49erFX Junior World Championships are international sailing regattas in the 49er and 49er FX classes organized by the host club on behalf of the class association and recognised by World Sailing. The 49er Youth Worlds were first held in 2011 with the class making its Olympic debut at the 2000 Games the event was conceived to give a pathway for young sailors progressing from the 29er or similar boats.

== Editions ==
Edition			Host			Event			Class				Sailors			Ref
No.	Date	Year	Host club	Location	Nat.	Boats	Gender		M	F	M/F	F/M	No.	Nats	Cont.	Ref
1	26-31 Jul	2011	Part of Travemünder Woche	Travemünde	Germany	49er	Open	U24	39	0	1	0	80	13	3	
2	-	2012		Lake Garda	Italy	49er	Open	U24	33				66	13	3	
3	24-28 Jul	2013	Polish Yachting Association	Gdynia	Poland	49er	Open	U24	32				64	12	3	
3	24-28 Jul	2013	Polish Yachting Association	Gdynia	Poland	FX	Open	U24	0	11	0	1	24	10	3	
4	24-28 Jul	2014	Aarhus Sailing Club	Aarhus	Denmark	49er	Open	U24	44				88	17	5	
4	24-28 Jul	2014	Aarhus Sailing Club	Aarhus	Denmark	FX	Open	U24	3	20	2	1	53	15	3	
5	23-27 Aug	2015	Flensburger Segel Club	Glücksburg	Germany	49er	Open	U24	49				98	17	5	
5	23-27 Aug	2015	Flensburger Segel Club	Glücksburg	Germany	FX	Open	U24	2	18	1	4	50	15	3	
6	30Aug -3Sep	2016	Sportivents	IJsselmeer	Netherlands	49er	Open									
6	30Aug -3Sep	2016	Sportivents	IJsselmeer	Netherlands	FX	Open									
7	29Jun -2Jul	2017	Portsmouth Olympic Harbour / Sail Kingston	Cork, Kingston	Canada	49er	Open	U23	10	0	0	0	20	5	4	
7	29Jun -2Jul	2017	Portsmouth Olympic Harbour / Sail Kingston	Cork, Kingston	Canada	FX	Open	U23	2	5	0	4	22	6	4	
8	28Aug -1Sep	2018	Yachting Club Pointe Rouge	Marseille, France	France	49er	Male	U23	52	-	-	-	104	19	5	
8	28Aug -1Sep	2018	Yachting Club Pointe Rouge	Marseille, France	France	FX	Open	U23	39				78	18	3	
9	3-7 Jul	2019	Royal Norwegian Yacht Club; Risør Yacht Club	Risør	Norway	49er	Open	U23	53				106	20	4	
9	3-7 Jul	2019	Royal Norwegian Yacht Club; Risør Yacht Club	Risør	Norway	FX	Open	U23	37				74	18	4	
N/A	-	2020	COVID													
10	5-11 Jul	2021	Polish Yachting Association	Gdynia	Poland	49er	Open	U23	43				86	18	2	
10	5-11 Jul	2021	Polish Yachting Association	Gdynia	Poland	FX	Open	U23	54				108	15	2	
11	31Jul -7Aug	2022	Gravedona ed Uniti	Lake Como	Italy	49er	Open	U23	68				136	27	5	
11	31Jul -7Aug	2022	Gravedona ed Uniti	Lake Como	Italy	FX	Open	U23	51				104	18	3	
12	25-29 Jul	2023	Part of Travemunder Woche	Travemunde	Germany	49er	Open	U23	56				112	21	4	
12	25-29 Jul	2023	Part of Travemunder Woche	Travemunde	Germany	FX	Open	U23	48				96	17	4	
13	17-21 Jul	2024		Galicia	Spain	49er	Open	U23	60				120	23	5	
13	17-21 Jul	2024		Galicia	Spain	FX	Female	U23	-	33	-	-	66	14	4	
14	30Jul -3Aug	2025	Royal Danish Yacht Club	Copenhagen	Denmark	49er	Open	U23	53				106	20	4	
14	30Jul -3Aug	2025	Royal Danish Yacht Club	Copenhagen	Denmark	FX	Female	U23	-	29	-	-	58	15	3	
14	30Jul -3Aug	2025	Royal Danish Yacht Club	Copenhagen	Denmark	FX	Male/Mix	U23	20	-	0	3	46	12	2	
15	19-26 Jul	2026	Royal Yacht Club Hollandia	Medemblik	Netherlands	49er	Male	U23	53	-	-	-	106	23	5	
15	19-26 Jul	2026	Royal Yacht Club Hollandia	Medemblik	Netherlands	FX	Female	U23	-	26	-	-	52	16	4	
15	19-26 Jul	2026	Royal Yacht Club Hollandia	Medemblik	Netherlands	FX	Male/Mix	U23	10	-	1	2	26	7	4	

=== 49er - Open ===
Year	Gender	Gold	Silver	Bronze	Ref.
(Germany) 2011	Open	Denmark; Niels Joachim Gormsen; Anders Thomsen	Great Britain; James Peters; Ed Fitzgerald	France; Vincent Berthez; Marc Mallaret	
(Italy) 2012	Open	Great Britain; James Peters; Ed Fitzgerald	Germany; Jan Hauke Erichsen; Max Lutz	Sweden; Charlie Ekberg; Niclas Düring	
(Poland) 2013	Open	Spain; Diego Botín; Pablo Turrado	Austria; Benjamin Bildstein; David Hussl	France; Kevin Fischer; Marc Mallaret	
(Denmark) 2014	Open	Spain; Víctor Payá; Álvaro del Arco	Denmark; Mads Lübeck; Christian Lübeck	Spain; Diego Botín; Pablo Turrado	
(Germany) 2015	Open	Austria; Benjamin Bildstein; David Hussl	Italy; Ruggero Tita; Giacomo Cavalli	Great Britain; Chris Taylor; Sam Batten	
(Netherlands) 2016	Open	France; Erwan Fischer; Thubault Julien	Germany; Tim Fischer; Fabian Graf	Germany; Jakob Meggendorfer; Andreas Spranger	
(Canada) 2017	Open	Canada; William Jones; Evan DePaul	United States; Dane Wilson; Scott Ewing	Thailand; Don Whitcraft; Dylan Whitcraft	
(France) 2018	Male	Ireland; Robert Dickson; Seán Waddilove	Germany; Max Stingle; Linov Scheel	Denmark; Daniel Nyborg; Sebastian Wright Olsen	
(Norway) 2019	Open	New Zealand; Isaac McHardie; William McKenzie	Great Britain; James Grummett; Daniel Budden	Ireland; Robert Dickson; Seán Waddilove	
2020	COVID				
(Poland) 2021	Open	Mikołaj Staniul (POL); Jakub Sztorch (POL)	Keanu Prettner (AUT); Jakob Flachberger (AUT)	Hernan Umpierre (URU); Fernando Diz (URU)	
(Italy) 2022	Open	Mikołaj Staniul (POL); Kuba Sztorch (POL)	Jack Ferguson (AUS); Max Paul (AUS)	Sam Morgan (NZL); Pat Morgan (NZL)	
2023	Open	Jack Ferguson (AUS); Jack Hildebrand (AUS)	Richard Schultheis (MLT); Youenn Bertin (FRA)	Marius Westerlind (SWE); Olle Aronsson (SWE)	
(Spain) 2024	Open	MLT 205; Richard Schultheis (GER); Youenn Bertin (MLT)	NZL 135; Francesco Kayrouz (NZL); Hamish Mclaren (NZL)	GER 363; Simon Heindl (GER); Conrad Jacobs (GER)	
(Netherlands) 2025	Open	Kjell Haschen (GER); Iven Anton Fromm (GER)	Robbert Huisman (NED); Jorn Swart (NED)	Lorenzo Pezzilli (ITA); Tobia Torroni (ITA)	
(Denmark) 2026	Male	Lorenzo Pezzilli (ITA); Tobia Torroni (ITA)	Kjell Haschen (GER); Iven Anton Fromm (GER)	Simon Heindl (GER); Conrad Jacobs (GER)	

=== 49er FX ===
Year	Gender	Gold	Silver	Bronze	Ref.
(Poland) 2013	Open	Finland; Noora Ruskola; Camilla Cedercreutz	Singapore; Griselda Khng; Sara Tan	Spain; María Cantero; Ana Hernández Moreno	
(Denmark) 2014	Open	Denmark; Marie Baad Nielsen; Marie Thusgaard Olsen	Netherlands; Annemiek Bekkering; Annette Duetz	Germany; Jule Görge; Lotta Görge	
(Germany) 2015	Open	Netherlands; Jeske Kisters; Charlotte Heijstek	Germany; Jule Görge; Lotta Görge	Norway; Ragna Agerup; Maia Agerup	
(Netherlands) 2016	Open	Italy; Maria Ottavia Raggio; Paola Bergamaschi	Sweden; Klara Wester; Rebecca Netzler	Denmark; Katrine Krogh; Christina Andersen	
(Canada) 2017		Norway; Ragna Agerup; Maia Agerup	Japan; Anna Yamazaki; Sena Takano	Spain; Carla Munté; Marta Munté	
(France) 2018	Open	Sweden; Vilma Bobeck; Malin Tengström	Finland; Ronja Grönblom; Sara Ehrnrooth	Netherlands; Willemijn Offerman; Judith Engberts	
(Norway) 2019	Open	Italy; Alexandra Stalder; Silvia Speri	Sweden; Vilma Bobeck; Malin Tengström	Netherlands; Willemijn Offerman; Elise Ruyter	
2020	NOT HELD DUE TO COVID				
(Poland) 2021	Open	Jana Germani (ITA); Giorgia Bertuzzi (ITA)	Richard Schultheis (MLT); Max Körner (MLT)	Willemijn Offerman (NED); Elise Ruyter (NED)	
(Italy) 2022	Open	Sebastian Menzies (NZL); George Lee Rush (NZL)	Pia Dahl Andersen (NOR); Nora Edland (NOR)	Helena Wolff (DEN); Carl Emil Sloth (DEN)	
(Germany) 2023	Open	Manon Peyre (FRA); Clara-Sofia Stamminger De Moura (FRA)	Illy Wureit (ISR); Yuval Barnoon (ISR)	Sofia Giunchiglia (ITA); Giulia Schio (ITA)	
(Spain) 2024	Male / Mixed	NOT HELD			
(Spain) 2024	Female	Sofia Giunchiglia (ITA); Giulia Schio (ITA)	Katharina Schwachhofer (GER); Elena Stoltze (GER)	Gabriela Czapska (POL); Hanna Rajchert (POL)	
(Denmark) 2025	Male / Mixed	Rebekka Johannesen (DEN); Gustav Aasholm-Bradley (DEN)	Lucas Hamm (GER); Moritz Hamm (GER)	Lukáš Kraus (CZE); Ondrej Baštář (CZE)	
(Denmark) 2025	Female	Katharina Schwachhofer (GER); Elena Stoltze (GER)	Chloé Revil (FRA); Felizia Fiebig (FRA)	Erin Mcilwaine (IRL); Ellen Barbour (IRL)	
(Netherlands) 2026	Male / Mixed	Henri Rothacher (SUI); Noah Strempfer (SUI)	Samantha Gardner (USA); Noah Nyenhuis (USA)	Jacob Ryu Bründler (SUI); Thierry Stucki (SUI)	
(Netherlands) 2026	Female	Ewa Lewandowska (POL); Anna Zwara (POL)	Klara Sobczak (POL); Magdalena Skórnóg (POL)	Manase Ichihashi (JPN); Rinko Goto (JPN)	

== See also ==
- 49er & 49er FX World Championships
- Sailing World Championships
- World Sailing
