= Sailing at the 2020 Summer Olympics – 49er FX =

Women's 49erFX at the Games of the XXXII Olympiad
- Line drawing of the 49er
- Venue: Tokyo
- Dates: 27 July – 2 August
- Competitors: 42 from 21 nations

Medalists
1st place, gold medalist(s)		Martine Grael; Kahena Kunze	Brazil
2nd place, silver medalist(s)		Tina Lutz; Susann Beucke	Germany
3rd place, bronze medalist(s)		Annemiek Bekkering; Annette Duetz	Netherlands

The women 49erFX was a sailing event at the 2020 Summer Olympics and took place between 27 July and 3 August. The defending champions, Martine Grael and Kahena Kunze from Brazil, won the event. Tina Lutz and Susann Beucke from Germany were the second, and Annemiek Bekkering and Annette Duetz from the Netherlands won the bronze medal. For Lutz, Beucke, Bekkring, and Duetz this was the first Olympic medal.

The medal race was originally scheduled for 2 August, but had to be postponed due to the lack of wind. Before the medal race, which costs twice as many points as every other race, Grael and Kunze were tied with Bekkering and Duetz for the first place, and Lutz and Beucke were in the third position. The medal race was won by Argentinians Victoria Travascio and María Sol Branz, which did not help them to move to a medal position. However, Duetz and Bekkering, who only managed to finish ninth out of ten competitors, moved to the third place, while Lutz and Beuke, who finished fifth, received the silver medal.

The medals were presented by IOC Member for Spain, Mr Juan Antonio Samaranch Jnr. (son of former Olympic President Juan Antonio Samaranch) and World Sailing President Li Quanhai.

== Schedule ==
Tue 27 Jul	Wed 28 Jul	Thurs 29 Jul	Fri 30 Jul	Sat 31 Jul	Sun 1 Aug	Tue 3 Aug
Race 1 Race 2 Race 3	Race 4 Race 5 Race 6	Rest day	Race 7 Race 8 Race 9	Race 10; Race 11; Race 12	Rest day	Medal race

== Results ==
Results of individual races
Pos	Crew	Country	I	II	III	IV	V	VI	VII	VIII	IX	X	XI	XII	MR	Tot	Pts
1st place, gold medalist(s)	Martine Grael; Kahena Kunze	Brazil	15^{†}	5	1	10	7	6	1	6	10	12	2	10	6	91.0	76.0
2nd place, silver medalist(s)	Tina Lutz; Susann Beucke	Germany	5	6	8	3	13^{†}	12	11	12	3	7	3	3	10	96.0	83.0
3rd place, bronze medalist(s)	Annemiek Bekkering; Annette Duetz	Netherlands	13	8	2	1	6	1	12	5	6	5	11	16^{†}	18	104.0	88.0
4	Támara Echegoyen; Paula Barceló	Spain	2	10	22^{†} UFD	2	3	3	13	4	5	19	12	4	12	111.0	89.0
5	Victoria Travascio; María Sol Branz	Argentina	6	9	13	18^{†}	17	8	6	1	8	1	7	12	2	108.0	90.0
6	Charlotte Dobson; Saskia Tidey	Great Britain	1	1	6	4	2	5	16	13	14	15	4	18^{†}	14	113.0	95.0
7	Helene Næss; Marie Rønningen	Norway	10	17	12	13	10	9	4	9	2	3	18^{†}	7	4	118.0	100.0
8	Ida Marie Baad Nielsen; Marie Thusgaard Olsen	Denmark	14	4	3	5	1	11	14	17^{†}	17	9	6	14	8	123.0	106.0
9	Lili Sebesi; Albane Dubois	France	4	15	10	6	8	2	7	14	13	18^{†}	14	2	16	129.0	111.0
10	Kimberly Lim; Cecilia Low	Singapore	12	12	11	15^{†}	15	13	3	2	7	8	1	13	20	132.0	117.0
11	Stephanie Roble; Maggie Shea	United States	3	2	14	7	9	16^{†}	5	8	12	14	22; DNE	5		117.0	101.0
12	Alex Maloney; Molly Meech	New Zealand	16	22^{†} UFD	5	12	4	4	8	3	18	6	19	6		123.0	101.0
13	Tess Lloyd; Jaime Ryan	Australia	9	11	7	9	11	10	15	10	19^{†}	11	8	8		128.0	109.0
14	Isaura Maenhaut; Anouk Geurts	Belgium	17	3	4	14	22^{†} DSQ	22; UFD	2	16	15	10	9	9		143.0	121.0
15	Aleksandra Melzacka; Kinga Łoboda	Poland	8	14	16	8	5	7	18	15	1	20^{†}	17	19		148.0	128.0
16	Alexandra Ten Hove; Mariah Millen	Canada	18^{†}	7	15	16	14	15	10	11	4	13	16	17		156.0	138.0
17	Tanja Frank; Lorena Abicht	Austria	11	13	9	11	12	22^{†} UFD	19	7	9	17	15	20		165.0	143.0
18	Anna Yamazaki; Sena Takano	Japan	7	16	22^{†} UFD	17	16	22; UFD	9	19	11	4	13	15		171.0	149.0
19	Chen Shasha; Jin Ye	China	20	19	17	22^{†} DNF	22; DNS	14	22; DSQ	22; DSQ	22; DSQ	2	10	1		193.0	171.0
20	Diana Tudela Ballon; María Pia van Oordt	Peru	19	18	22^{†} UFD	19	18	17	17	18	16	16	5	11		196.0	174.0
21	Eye Guezguez; Sarra Guezguez	Tunisia	22^{†} DNF	22; DNC	22; DNC	22; DNC	22; DNC	22; DNC	22; UFD	20	20	21	20	21		256.0	234.0

Scoring system: low-point system;
Legend: – Qualified for medal race(s); DSQ – Disqualified; UFD – "U" flag disqualification; † – Discarded race not counted in the overall result;
