= Ida Marie Baad Nielsen =

Danish sailor (born 1992)

Ida Marie Baad
Personal information
- Full name: Ida Marie Baad Nielsen
- Nationality: Danish
- Born: 9 July 1992 (age 33)
- Height: 1.66 m (5 ft 5 in)

Sailing career
- Sport: Sailing
- Class(es): 49er FX, 29er, 420
Medal record
Sailing
Representing Denmark
World Championships
| Silver medal – second place | 2014 Santander | 49er FX |
| Bronze medal – third place | 2015 Buenos Aires | 49er FX |
| Bronze medal – third place | 2019 Auckland | 49er FX |
European Championships
| Gold medal – first place | 2013 Aarhus | 49er FX |
| Gold medal – first place | 2014 Helsinki | 49er FX |

Ida Marie Baad Nielsen (born 9 July 1992) is a Danish sailor. She competed in the 49er FX event at the 2020 Summer Olympics.
