= Kinga Łoboda =

Polish sailor

Personal information
- Nationality: Polish
- Born: 11 June 1996 (age 29) Gdańsk, Poland
- Height: 1.72 m (5 ft 8 in)

Sport

Sailing career
- Class(es): 49erFX, ILCA 6

Kinga Łoboda (born 11 June 1996) is a Polish sailor. She and Aleksandra Melzacka competed for Poland at the 2020 Summer Olympics in the 49er FX event.
