= Marie Thusgaard Olsen =

Danish sailor (born 1993)

Personal information
- Nationality: Danish
- Born: 21 May 1993 (age 33)
- Height: 1.73 m (5 ft 8 in)

Sailing career
- Sport: Sailing
- Class(es): 49er FX, 29er, 420
Medal record
Sailing
Representing Denmark
World Championships
Silver medal – second place	2014 Santander	49er FX
Bronze medal – third place	2015 Buenos Aires	49er FX
Bronze medal – third place	2019 Auckland	49er FX
European Championships
Gold medal – first place	2013 Aarhus	49er FX
Gold medal – first place	2014 Helsinki	49er FX

Marie Thusgaard Olsen (born 21 May 1993) is a Danish sailor. She competed in the 49er FX event at the 2020 Summer Olympics.
