= Lili Sebesi =

French sailor

Lili Sebesi (born 24 July 1992) is a French sailor. She competed at the 2020 Summer Olympics in the 49er FX class together with Albane Dubois.
