= Vilma Bobeck =

Swedish sailor

Personal information
- Born: 5 January 1998 (age 28) Nacka, Sweden

Sailing career
- Sport: Sailing
- Club: Royal Swedish Yacht Club
- Class: 49er FX
Medal record
Women's sailing
Representing Sweden
Olympic Games
Silver medal – second place	2024 Paris	49er FX
World Championships
Gold medal – first place	2023 The Hague	49er FX
Silver medal – second place	2015 Arendal	Europe
Silver medal – second place	2022 Halifax	49er FX
Silver medal – second place	2024 Lanzarote	49er FX
Silver medal – second place	2025 Cagliari	49er FX
European Championships
Silver medal – second place	2022 Weymouth	49er FX

Vilma Bobeck (born 5 January 1998) is a Swedish sailor. She competed in the 49er FX event at the 2024 Summer Olympics, where she won the silver medal in the women's 49er FX event together with Rebecca Netzler. Bobeck also has four World championship medals in the 49er FX, including one gold, and one in the Europe dinghy.

== Biography ==
=== Early life ===
Bobeck was born 5 January 1998 in Saltsjö-Boo, Sweden, to Madelaine and Göran Bobeck. Raised in Saltsjö-Boo, Bobeck started sailing in Boo Segelsällskap before switching to the Royal Swedish Yacht Club. Sailing the Europe dinghy, Bobeck won a silver medal after Anna Livbjerg at the 2015 Europe World Championships in Arendal, Norway. Bobeck studied at the sailing riksidrottsgymnasium in Motala.

=== 49er FX ===
Bobeck continued to the 49er FX, sailing together with Malin Tengström, and won the 2018 U23 World Championships in Marseille. The duo then placed third at the 2019 European championship in the class. Not qualifying for the 2020 Summer Olympics, Bobeck finished her career.

In 2022, Bobeck and Rebecca Netzler coupled to sail in the 49er FX class. In their first world championship in 2022, the duo won a silver medal. In August 2023, Bobeck and Netzler won the 2023 Sailing World Championships in The Hague. In the following world championship in Lanzarote, the team didn't manage to the defend their title, and instead took a silver medal. At the 2024 Summer Olympics, the duo took a silver medal in the 49er FX event behind Odile van Aanholt and Annette Duetz of the Netherlands. The Sweden duo came into the medal race sitting third and won the race, doing so passing the French boat who had entered the medal race as leaders.

In September 2025, Bobeck's partner Netzler announced her retirement after one Olympic silver medal, one World championship title and two World championship silver medals for the duo. After Netzler's departure, Bobeck coupled with Ebba Berntsson and won a silver medal at the 2025 49er FX World Championship in Cagliari, Italy, in October 2025.
