= James Peters (sailor) =

British sailor

Personal information
- Full name: James Mansfield Peters
- Nationality: British
- Born: 12 October 1992 (age 34) Tunbridge Wells, Kent, England

Sailing career
- Sport: Sailing
- Club: Hayling Island Sailing Club
- Class: 49er
Medal record
Sailing
Representing Great Britain
Youth Sailing World Championships
Gold medal – first place	2008 Aarhus	Men's 29er

James Mansfield Peters (born 12 October 1992) is a British sailor, who is a member of Hayling Island Sailing Club.

Peters won the Youth Sailing World Championships 2008 in Aarhus, Denmark, in the 29er alongside Edward FitzGerald. He was named Raymarine Young Sailor Of The Year in 2009, alongside his sister, Frances.

He competed at the 2024 Olympic Games in the 49er competition, where he and Fynn Sterritt placed seventh. They had previously won the 49er European Championship earlier in the year.
