= 2016 Youth Sailing World Championships =

Event title
- Edition: 46th

Event details
- Venue: Auckland, New Zealand
- Dates: 14 - 20 December 2016

The 2016 Youth Sailing World Championships took place in Auckland, New Zealand from 14 to 20 December. It was the 46th edition of the Youth Sailing World Championships.

== Competition format ==
=== Events and equipment ===
Event	Equipment
Boy's dinghy (single hander)	Laser Radial
Boy's dinghy (double hander)	420
Boy's skiff	29er
Boy's windsurfer	RS:X
Girl's dinghy (single hander)	Laser Radial
Girl's dinghy (double hander)	420
Girl's skiff	29er
Girl's windsurfer	RS:X
Open Multihull	Nacra 15

== Summary ==
=== Medal table ===
* Host nation (China)

Rank	Nation	Gold	Silver	Bronze	Total
1	Australia	2	0	1	3
2	Great Britain	2	0	0	2
3	Israel	1	2	0	3
4	France	1	1	1	3
4	United States	1	1	1	3
6	Poland	1	1	0	2
7	Uruguay	1	0	0	1
8	Italy	0	2	1	3
9	Croatia	0	1	0	1
9	Netherlands	0	1	0	1
11	Argentina	0	0	1	1
11	Belgium	0	0	1	1
11	China	0	0	1	1
11	New Zealand*	0	0	1	1
11	Peru	0	0	1	1
Totals (15 entries)		9	9	9	27

=== Event medalists ===
==== Men's events ====
Event	First	Second	Third
Laser Radial	Finnian Alexander; Australia	Paolo Giargia; Italy	Carrson Pearce; United States
420	Wiley Rogers; Jack Parkin; United States	Ido Bilik; Ofek Shalgi; Israel	Fausto Peralta; Martin Arroyo Verdi; Argentina
29er	Crispin Beaumont; Tom Darling; Great Britain	Gwendal Nael; Lilian Mercier; France	John Cooley; Simon Hoffman; Australia
RS:X	Yoav Omer; Israel	Sil Hoekstra; Netherlands	Hao Chen; China

==== Women's events ====
Event	First	Second	Third
Laser Radial	Dolores Moreira; Uruguay	Sandra Luli; Croatia	Carolina Albano; Italy
420	Julia Szmit; Hanna Dzik; Poland	Alexandra Stalder; Silvia Speri; Italy	Violette Dorange; Camille Orion; France
29er	Natasha Bryant; Annie Wilmot; Australia	Aleksandra Melzacka; Maja Micinska; Poland	Greta Stewart; Kate Stewart; New Zealand
RS:X	Emma Wilson; Great Britain	Katy Spychakov; Israel	María Belén Bazo; Peru

==== Open events ====
Event	First	Second	Third
Nacra 15	Tim Mourniac; Charles Dorange; France	Romain Screve; Ian Brill; United States	Henri Demesmaeker; Isaura Maenhaut; Belgium
