= María Pia van Oordt =

Peruvian sailor

Personal information
- Full name: María Pia van Oordt López
- Nationality: Peruvian
- Born: 18 March 2000 (age 25)

Sailing career
- Class(es): 49erFX, ILCA 4, ILCA 6

María Pia van Oordt López (Note: In this Spanish name, the first or paternal surname is van Oordt and the second or maternal family name is López.) (born 18 March 2000) is a Peruvian sailor. She and Diana Tudela competed for Peru at the 2020 Summer Olympics in the 49er FX event.
