= Lucas Rual =

French sailor (born 1995)

Personal information
- Nationality: French
- Born: 25 April 1995 (age 31) Rennes, France

Sailing career
- Sport: Sailing
- Classes: 49er, 29er
Medal record
Sailing
Representing France
29er World Championships
Gold medal – first place	2013 Denmark	29er
Silver medal – second place	2012 Germany	29er

Lucas Rual (born 25 April 1995) is a French sailor. He and Émile Amoros competed for France at the 2020 Summer Olympics in the 49er event.
