= Ida Nielsen =

Ida Nielsen can refer to:

- Ida Kristine Nielsen (born 1975), Danish bass player, composer, and singer
- Ida Marie Baad Nielsen (born 1992), Danish sailor
