= Diana Tudela =

Peruvian sailor

Personal information
- Full name: Diana María Tudela Ballon
- Nationality: Peruvian
- Born: 5 July 2000 (age 24)

Sailing career
- Class(es): 49erFX, ILCA 4

Diana María Tudela Ballon (Note: In this Spanish name, the first or paternal surname is Tudela and the second or maternal family name is Ballon.) (born 5 July 2000) is a Peruvian sailor. She and María Pia van Oordt competed for Peru at the 2020 Summer Olympics in the 49er FX event.
