= Evie Haseldine =

Australian competitive sailor

Personal information
- Born: 27 March 2003 (age 23) Westmead, New South Wales, Australia

Sailing career
- Sport: Sailing
- Class: 49er FX
Medal record
Women's sailing
Representing Australia
World Championships
Bronze medal – third place	2023 The Hague	49er FX

Evie Haseldine (born 27 March 2003) is a sailor from Australia. She represented Australia at the 2024 Summer Olympics with Olivia Price in Skiff – 49er FX. The duo also won bronze in the same event at the 2023 Sailing World Championships.
