= Elise de Ruijter =

Dutch competitive sailor

Personal information
- Born: 29 June 1999 (age 27) Leidschendam, Netherlands

Sailing career
- Sport: Sailing
- Class: 49er FX
Medal record
Women's sailing
Representing Netherlands
World Championships
Gold medal – first place	2021 Wudam Al Sahil	49er FX
European Championships
Gold medal – first place	2021 Thessaloniki	49er FX

Elise de Ruijter (born 29 June 1999) is a female sailor from the Netherlands.

She is, with Odile van Aanholt, the 2021 49er FX World champion and 49er FX European champion.
