= Helene Næss =

Norwegian sailor

Personal information
- Nationality: Norwegian
- Born: 29 June 1991 (age 35) Tønsberg, Norway
- Height: 169 cm (5 ft 7 in)

Sailing career
- Sport: Sailing
- Club: Tønsberg Seilforening
- Class(es): 49erFX, 29er
Medal record
Women's sailing
Representing Norway
World Championships
| Silver medal – second place | 2021 Oman | 49er FX |
European Championships
| Gold medal – first place | 2018 Gdynia | 49er FX |
| Gold medal – first place | 2023 Vilamoura | 49er FX |
| Silver medal – second place | 2019 Weymouth | 49er FX |
| Silver medal – second place | 2020 Lake Attersee | 49er FX |

Helene Næss (born 29 June 1991) is a Norwegian competitive sailor, born in Tønsberg. Her achievements include winning two gold medals at the European championships, a silver medal at the world championships, and a fourth place and seventh place at the Olympic Games.

== Career ==
Næss won a gold medal in 49er FX at the 2018 49er & 49er FX European Championships, along with Marie Rønningen. She qualified to represent Norway at the 2020 Summer Olympics in Tokyo 2021, competing in 49erFX, where they placed seventh.

Later this year, Næss and Rønningen won a silver medal at the 2021 49er & 49er FX World Championships.

Along with Rønningen, she won a gold medal at the 2023 European Championships.

Selected to compete at the 2024 Summer Olympics, Næss and Rønningen placed fourth in 49er FX at the 2024 Olympics.
