= 29er XX =

Sailing skiff

- 29erXX

Boat
- Crew: 2 (twin trapeze)

Hull
- Hull weight: 74.25 kg (163.7 lb)
- LOA: 4,450 mm (175 in)
- Beam: 1.77 m (5 ft 10 in)

Rig
- Mast height: 7,626 mm (300.2 in)

Sails
- Gennaker area: 19.0 m^{2} (205 sq ft)
- Upwind sail area: 15.0 m^{2} (161 sq ft)

The 29er XX is a high-performance sailing skiff. It was designed to allow light crews, particularly female crews, to sail twin-trapeze boats, and to serve as a training boat for the more powerful 49er. The class gained International Sailing Federation Class status in May 2011, but lost it in 2014.

== Design ==
The 29er XX is a high-powered rig for the 29er hull; the rig is similar to that of the 49er, the 29er's larger sibling. This new rig is 0.45 m longer than the standard 29er mast, and features carbon construction, double trapeze wires and three sets of shrouds. A masthead kite adds speed downwind. The 29er platform requires sailors to move with precision through manoeuvres. Carbon tubes extend out the back of each rail to allow the crew to keep their weight further aft and the bow out of the water.

Initially the hull was thought to be too small for its rig, training on San Francisco Bay disproved that notion. The lack of an adjustable rudder or other extra controls makes the 29er XX a simple design that is sensitive to sailors' movements. 29er XX sailors need to be athletic and coordinated, as the skiff challenges even advanced sailors.

== History ==
The 29er XX was designed by Julian Bethwaite with help from Jen Glass.

The first international regatta was held in Weymouth, UK, in the summer of 2006. The event brought together 27 men's, women's and mixed teams from eight countries, who provided input that helped refine the design.

Downwind, the 29er XX has a considerable advantage over the original 29er due to the increased sail size, masthead kite and the ability to have both crew members on the wire. Upwind, the difference is less noticeable, but the 29er XX still has the advantage.

In April 2007, at the Women's High Performance Dinghy Evaluation Event in Hyères, France, ISAF conducted extensive trials of the 29er XX as a possible choice for a women's high performance dinghy class at the 2016 Olympics.

== Events ==
=== World Champions ===
Year	Gold	Silver	Bronze
2012; Riva del Garda	Germany; Victoria Jurczok; Anika Lorenz	Germany; Jule Görge; Lotta Görge	Germany; Leonie Meyer; Elena Christine Stoffers
