= Benjamin Bildstein =

Austrian sailor

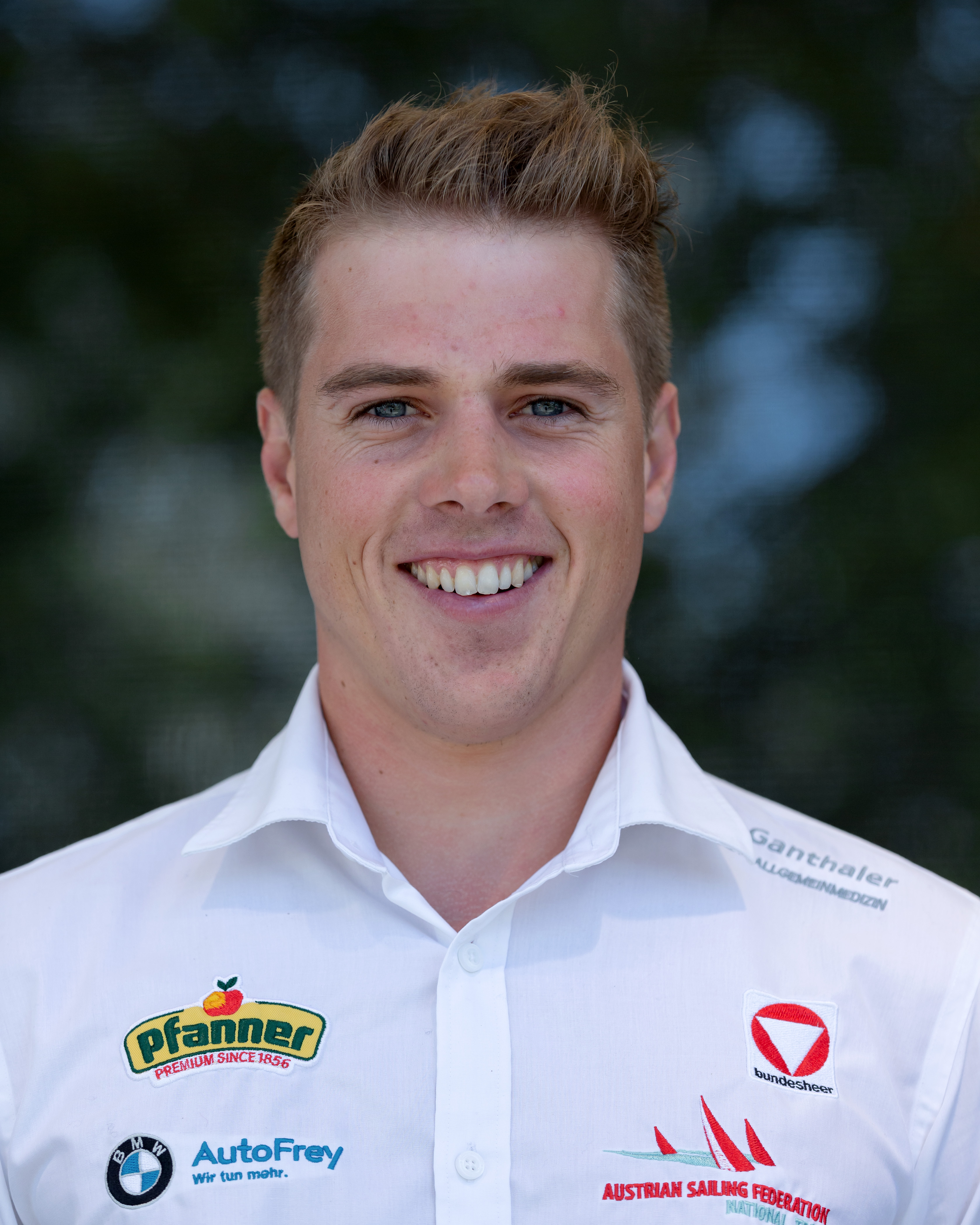
- Bildstein in 2019

Personal information
- Nationality: Austrian
- Born: 16 January 1992 (age 34)

Sport
- Sport: Sailing

Benjamin Bildstein (born 16 January 1992) is an Austrian sailor. He competed in the 49er events at the 2020 Summer Olympics, where he finished 10th, and the 2024 Olympics, where he finished 14th. He competed in both Olympics alongside David Hussl.
