= Odile van Aanholt =

Dutch competitive sailor

Personal information
- Nationality: Dutch
- Born: 14 January 1998 (age 28) Willemstad, Curaçao, Netherlands Antilles

Sailing career
- Country: Netherlands
- Sport: Sailing
Medal record
Women's sailing
Representing Netherlands
Olympic Games
Gold medal – first place	2024 Paris	49er FX
World Championships
Gold medal – first place	2021 Wudam Al Sahil	49er FX
Gold medal – first place	2022 Canada	49er FX
European Championships
Gold medal – first place	2021 Thessaloniki	49er FX
- Updated on 27 September 2022

Odile van Aanholt (born 14 January 1998) is a Dutch Olympic sailor. She was born in Curaçao so originally competed for the Netherland Antilles. She won gold at the 2024 Paris Olympics in the woman's 49er FX with crew Annette Duetz.

== Sailing career ==
=== Olympics ===
Pos.	Title	Class	Note
Gold	2024 Summer Olympic Games	49er FX	crew was Annette Duetz (NED)
Silver	2014 Youth Olympics	Byte CII	

=== World Championships ===
Year	Pos	Title	Note
2026	14	Female 49er FX World Championship	crew was Karlinde van Arendonk (NED)
2024	1	Female 49er FX World Championship	crew was Annette Duetz (NED)
2023	2	Female 49er FX World Championship	crew was Annette Duetz (NED)
2022	1	Female 49er FX World Championship	crew was Annette Duetz (NED)
2021	1	Female 49er FX World Championship	crew was Elise Ruyter (NED)
2020	26	Female 49er FX World Championship	crew was Cecile Janmaat (NED)
2019	10	Female 49er FX World Championship	crew was Cecile Janmaat (NED)
2018	6	Female 49er FX World Championship	crew was Marieke Jongens (NED)
2017	20	Female 49er FX World Championship	crew was Nicole van der Velden (ARU)
2016	39	Female 49er FX World Championship	crew was Philipine van Aanholt (ARU)
2019	47	49erFX Youth World Championships	crew was Bart Lambriex (NED)
2016	14	49erFX Youth World Championships	crew was Philipine van Aanholt
2015	14	49erFX Youth World Championships	crew was Robin Becker (NED)
2016	8	46th Youth Sailing World Championships - Laser Radial - Female	
2015	1	Female - Byte CII World Championship	
2014	4	44th Youth Sailing World Championships - 29er - Open	crew was Lars Van Stekelenborg (NED)
2016	16	29er World Championship	crew was Bart Lambriex (ARU)
2015	70	29er World Championship	crew was Quinten Bramervaer (NED)
2013	57	29er World Championship	crew was Femke Adamse (NED)
2011	4	IODA Optimist Team Racing World Championship	
2011	56	Optimist World Championship	

=== Other Events ===
In 2013, at the age of 14, Van Aanholt was the South American Optimist champion.

Sailing World detailed her training in the Persico 69F in preparation for the 2021 Youth America's Cup in Auckland.

Van Aanholt also sails in the 49erFX, starting first with Marieke Jongens. She is, with Elise de Ruijter, the 2021 49er FX World Champion and 49er FX European Champion.

== Family ==
Her father is Cor van Aanholt who was also a competitive sailor having participated in the 2000 Summer Olympics in the Laser class and flag bearer at Sydney 2000. He has also won the Sunfish World Championship, This led to him being member of the Board of the World Olympians Association. She is the daughter of sports scientist Marjolein van Aanholt Grol.

She has three siblings who are all also competitive sailors, some of their accomplishments:

- Brother Ard van Aanholt won a bronze medal in the Sunfish Class at the 2010 Central American and Caribbean Games in Mayagüez, Puerto Rico.
- Sister Philipine van Aanholt (1992) she competed in the 2012 olympics and also 2016 where she was flag bearer for Aruba.
- Brother Just van Aanholt (1995) is an Olympian for Aruba and won silver at the 2010 Youth Olympics for the Netherlands Antilles.

She is married to fellow Dutch 49er olympic sailor Bart Lambriex in 2025 and they have a daughter, Kato Lambriex van Aanholt born in 2025.
