= Susann Beucke =

German sailor (born 1991)

Personal information
- Born: 11 June 1991 (age 35) Kiel, Germany
- Height: 1.75 m (5 ft 9 in)

Sailing career
- Sport: Sailing
- Club: Norddeutscher Regatta Verein
- Class(es): 49er FX, 470, 29er, Figaro Bénéteau 3, IMOCA 60
Medal record
Women's sailing
Representing Germany
Olympic Games
Silver medal – second place	2020 Tokyo	49er FX
European Championships
Gold medal – first place	2017 Geelong	49er FX
Gold medal – first place	2020 Lake Attersee	49er FX

Susann Beucke (born 11 June 1991) is a German sailor who competes offshore races of the Figaro Bénéteau 3 and IMOCA 60 classes. Before focusing on offshore sailing she competed in Olympic sailing, primarily in the 49er FX class, winning the silver medal in the 2020 Summer Olympics in Tokyo along with Tina Lutz, representing Germany.

== Olympic sailing (2009 - 2021 ) ==
In her early career she raced in the 49er FX, 470 and 29er classes.

Focusing on the 49er FX category, along with Tina Lutz, she won a gold medal at the 2017 and 2020 49er & 49er FX European Championships. In their third attempt Beucke and Lutz qualified to represent Germany at the 2020 Summer Olympics in Tokyo, where they won a Silver medal, the best result for German sailing in 21 years.

== Offshore sailing (since 2017) ==
=== Figaro Bénéteau sailing ===
Starting in 2022 she competes in the Figaro Bénéteau 3 class. Participating in the 2022 and 2023 editions of the La Solitaire du Figaro race she reached 31st and 27th place.

=== IMOCA 60 sailing ===
As part of Team Holcim - PRB she won the second leg of the 14th edition of The Ocean Race in 2023.

Beucke has announced a campaign to participate in 11th edition of the Vendée Globe, a non-stop solo race around the world using IMOCA 60 class offshore yachts, starting in 2028.

== Offshore sailing results ==
Year	Pos	Event	Class	Yacht	Notes	Ref
Round the world races
Transatlantic Races
2023	1	The Ocean Race leg 2	IMOCA 60	Holcim - PRB	with skipper Kevin Escoffier and crew	
Other (important) Races
2023	27	La Solitaire du Figaro	Figaro Bénéteau 3	This Race is Female		
2022	31	La Solitaire du Figaro	Figaro Bénéteau 3	This Race is Female		
