= Sailing at the 2014 Summer Youth Olympics – Girls' Byte CII =

Girls' Byte CII at the II Summer Youth Olympic Games
- Venue: Jinniu Lake
- Dates: August 18–23, 2014
- Competitors: 30 from 30 nations

Medalists
| 1st place, gold medalist(s) | | Samantha Yom | Singapore |
| 2nd place, silver medalist(s) | | Odile van Aanholt | Netherlands |
| 3rd place, bronze medalist(s) | | Jarian Brandes | Peru |

Girls' Byte CII class competition at the 2014 Summer Youth Olympics in Nanjing took place from August 18 to August 23 at Jinniu Lake. 30 sailors competed in this dinghy competition.

Eight races were scheduled.

== Medalists ==
| Gold | Samantha Yom; Singapore |
| Silver | Odile van Aanholt; Netherlands |
| Bronze | Jarian Brandes; Peru |

== Results ==
| Rank | Athlete | Race | | | | | | | | Total Points | Net Points |
| Rank | Athlete | 1 | 2 | 3 | 4 | 5 | 6 | 7 | 8 | Total Points | Net Points |
|---|---|---|---|---|---|---|---|---|---|---|---|
| 1st place, gold medalist(s) | Samantha Yom (SIN) | 2 | 5 | 3 | (21) | 2 | 2 | 11 | 2 | 48 | 27 |
| 2nd place, silver medalist(s) | Odile van Aanholt (NED) | 6 | 3 | 1 | 1 | (8) | 8 | 2 | 7 | 36 | 28 |
| 3rd place, bronze medalist(s) | Jarian Brandes (PER) | 3 | 6 | 7 | 15 | 11 | (21) | 3 | 5 | 71 | 50 |
| 4 | Kateryna Gumenko (UKR) | 9 | (18) | 9 | 12 | 7 | 10 | 1 | 4 | 70 | 52 |
| 5 | Caroline Rosmo (NOR) | 10 | 4 | 10 | 7 | 12 | (17) | 6 | 6 | 72 | 55 |
| 6 | Nur Mohamad Latif (MAS) | 13 | 13 | (16) | 11 | 5 | 5 | 5 | 8 | 76 | 60 |
| 7 | Celeste Lugtmeijer (DOM) | 12 | 2 | 6 | 6 | 27 | 1 | (31); DNF | 15 | 100 | 69 |
| 8 | Carolina Albano (ITA) | 5 | 7 | 12 | 8 | 3 | 9 | (31); DNS | 25 | 100 | 69 |
| 9 | Dolores Moreira (URU) | 4 | (19) | 14 | 16 | 18 | 15 | 4 | 1 | 91 | 72 |
| 10 | Cecilia Wollmann (BER) | (14) | 31; DNF | 2 | 5 | 4 | 4 | 13 | 13 | 86 | 72 |
| 11 | Mária Érdi (HUN) | 19 | 26 | 4 | 10 | 6 | 6 | 31; DNF | 3 | 105 | 74 |
| 12 | Alexandra Dahlberg (FIN) | 1 | 1 | (29) | 13 | 16 | 20 | 21 | 10 | 111 | 82 |
| 13 | Paula Pelayo (MEX) | 7 | 21 | 11 | 14 | 10 | (25) | 9 | 12 | 99 | 84 |
| 14 | Romina De Iulio (ECU) | (27) | 22 | 17 | 2 | 15 | 3 | 7 | 21 | 104 | 87 |
| 15 | Louise Cervera (FRA) | (21) | 8 | 8 | 19 | 14 | 13 | 20 | 9 | 112 | 91 |
| 16 | Paige Clarke (ISV) | 16 | 12 | (23) | 4 | 19 | 12 | 19 | 14 | 122 | 96 |
| 17 | Natascha Boddener (BRA) | 18 | 10 | 5 | 3 | 24 | 27 | 10 | (29) | 128 | 99 |
| 18 | Hanna Brant (GBR) | 22 | 14 | 15 | 20 | 1 | 7 | 31 (DNF) | 24 | 134 | 103 |
| 19 | Nichaporn Panmuean (THA) | 15 | 17 | 21 | (22) | 17 | 11 | 17 | 11 | 131 | 109 |
| 20 | Viktoriya Hinkovska (BUL) | 23 | 15 | (24) | 18 | 9 | 23 | 14 | 18 | 144 | 120 |
| 21 | Mafalda Pires de Lima (POR) | 31 (DQ) | 9 | 13 | 9 | 22 | 18 | 22 | 28 | 152 | 121 |
| 22 | Florence Allan (CAY) | 8 | 24 | 25 | 17 | 13 | 16 | 31 (DNF) | 19 | 153 | 122 |
| 23 | Karla Šavar (CRO) | 20 | 16 | 19 | (23) | 20 | 14 | 16 | 20 | 148 | 125 |
| 24 | Elyse Ainsworth (AUS) | 17 | 11 | 18 | 24 | 26 | 22 | 23 | (27) | 169 | 142 |
| 25 | Khouloud Mansy (EGY) | 24 | 25 | 20 | 27 | 23 | (29) | 12 | 23 | 183 | 154 |
| 26 | Kelly González (CHI) | 11 | 28 | 22 | 26 | 21 | 26 | 18 | (30) | 184 | 154 |
| 27 | Kirana Wardojo (INA) | 31 (DQ) | 31 DNE | 28 | 28 | 31 DQ | 24 | 8 | 16 | 197 | 166 |
| 28 | Abigail Affoo (TTO) | 28 | 23 | 26 | 29 | 29 | (30) | 15 | 17 | 197 | 167 |
| 29 | Nouha Akil (ALG) | 26 | (27) | 27 | 25 | 25 | 19 | 24 | 26 | 199 | 172 |
| 30 | Megan Robertson (RSA) | 25 | 20 | (30) | 30 | 28 | 28 | 25 | 22 | 208 | 178 |

=== Notes ===
Scoring abbreviations are defined as follows:

- OCS – On the Course Side of the starting line
- DSQ – Disqualified
- DNF – Did Not Finish
- DNS – Did Not Start
- BFD – Black Flag Disqualification
- RAF – Retired after Finishing
