= Sophie Ainsworth =

British sailor (born 1989)

Personal information
- Full name: Sophie Claire Ainsworth
- Nationality: British
- Born: 22 June 1989 (age 37) Ashford, Kent, England
- Height: 173 cm (5 ft 8 in)
- Weight: 68 kg (150 lb)

Sailing career
- Sport: Sailing
- Classes: 49er FX, 29er, 420, 470
Medal record
Sailing
Representing Great Britain
World Championships
| Bronze medal – third place | 2018 Aarhus | 49er FX |
European Championships
| Gold medal – first place | 2012 Largs | 470 |
| Bronze medal – third place | 2018 Gdynia | 49er FX |

Sophie Claire Ainsworth (born 22 June 1989) is a British sailor who qualified to compete at the 2016 Summer Olympics being held in Rio de Janeiro, Brazil.

== Personal life ==
Ainsworth was born on 22 June 1989 in Ashford, Kent, England. She studied exercise and sports science at the University of Exeter. Whilst at the university she was sponsored by a local law firm as part of a sports scholarship scheme.

== Sailing ==
She finished tenth at the 2010 European 470 Championships, alongside fellow University of Exeter alumni Sophie Weguelin. Ainsworth and Weguelin won their first World Cup regatta medal in Miami in 2012, winning the bronze medal as British teammates and training partners Hannah Mills and Saskia Clark won silver. They then won a gold medal at the 2012 European Championship event in Largs, Scotland. The British pair were one of four teams in contention heading into the final race in 2012 and secured the overall title ahead of Slovenian pair Tina Mrak and Teja Cerne despite finishing behind them in the medal race.

In 2013 Ainsworth teamed up with Charlotte Dobson to compete in the 49er FX classification. At the 2014 49er European Championships, held in Helsinki, Finland, the pair managed a sixth place.

The following year, at the 49er FX World Championships, held in San Isidro, Argentina, they finished in fifth place, only four points behind the medal positions.

With these successes behind them, in March 2016 they were selected as part of the Great Britain team for the 2016 Summer Olympics to be held in Rio de Janeiro, Brazil. They are due to compete in the women's 49er FX event, which is making its debut at the Games. They competed in the Princess Sofia Trophy in Palma, Majorca in April 2016, finishing fifth in the opening race before suffering problems with their equipment in race two. They eventually placed sixth overall after taking second place in the final race. Later that month at the 49er European Championships in Barcelona, Spain, Ainsworth and Dobson were joint third after the second day of competition where they finished their three races, first, second and third. A victory in the final medal race meant they eventually finished ninth overall, and seventh among European boats.
