= Marie Rønningen =

Norwegian sailor (born 1994)

Personal information
- Born: 13 March 1994 (age 32) Bærum, Norway
- Height: 175 cm (5 ft 9 in)

Sport
- Sport: Sailing
- Event: 49er FX
- Club: Tønsberg Seilforening
Medal record
Women's sailing
Representing Norway
World Championships
Silver medal – second place	2021 Oman	49er FX
European Championships
Gold medal – first place	2018 Gdynia	49er FX
Gold medal – first place	2023 Vilamoura	49er FX
Silver medal – second place	2019 Weymouth	49er FX
Silver medal – second place	2020 Lake Attersee	49er FX

Marie Rønningen (born 13 March 1994) is a Norwegian competitive sailor, born in Bærum.

Sailing the 49er FX, her achievements include two gold medals at the European championships, a silver medal at the world championships, and a fourth place and seventh place at the Olympic Games.

== Career ==
Rønningen won a gold medal in 49er FX at the 2018 49er & 49er FX European Championships, along with Helene Næss. Selected to represent Norway at the 2020 Summer Olympics in Tokyo 2021, along with Næss, they placed seventh in 49erFX. Rønningen and Næss won a silver medal at the 2021 49er & 49er FX World Championships.

Along with Næss, she won a gold medal at the 2023 European Championships.

Selected to compete at the 2024 Summer Olympics, Næss and Rønningen placed fourth in 49er FX at the 2024 Olympics.
