= Albane Dubois =

French sailor

Personal information
- Nationality: French
- Born: 1 April 1992 (age 34) Roubaix, France

Sport
- Sport: Sailing

Albane Dubois (born 1 April 1992) is a French sailor. She competed in the 49er FX event at the 2020 Summer Olympics.
