= Chen Shasha =

Chinese windsurfer and sailor

Personal information
- Nationality: Chinese
- Born: 14 December 1989 (age 35)

Sport
- Sport: Sailing

Chen Shasha (Chinese: 陈莎莎, born 14 December 1989) is a Chinese professional female windsurfer and sailor. She competed in the 49er FX event at the 2020 Summer Olympics.
