= Tina Lutz =

German sailor (born 1990)

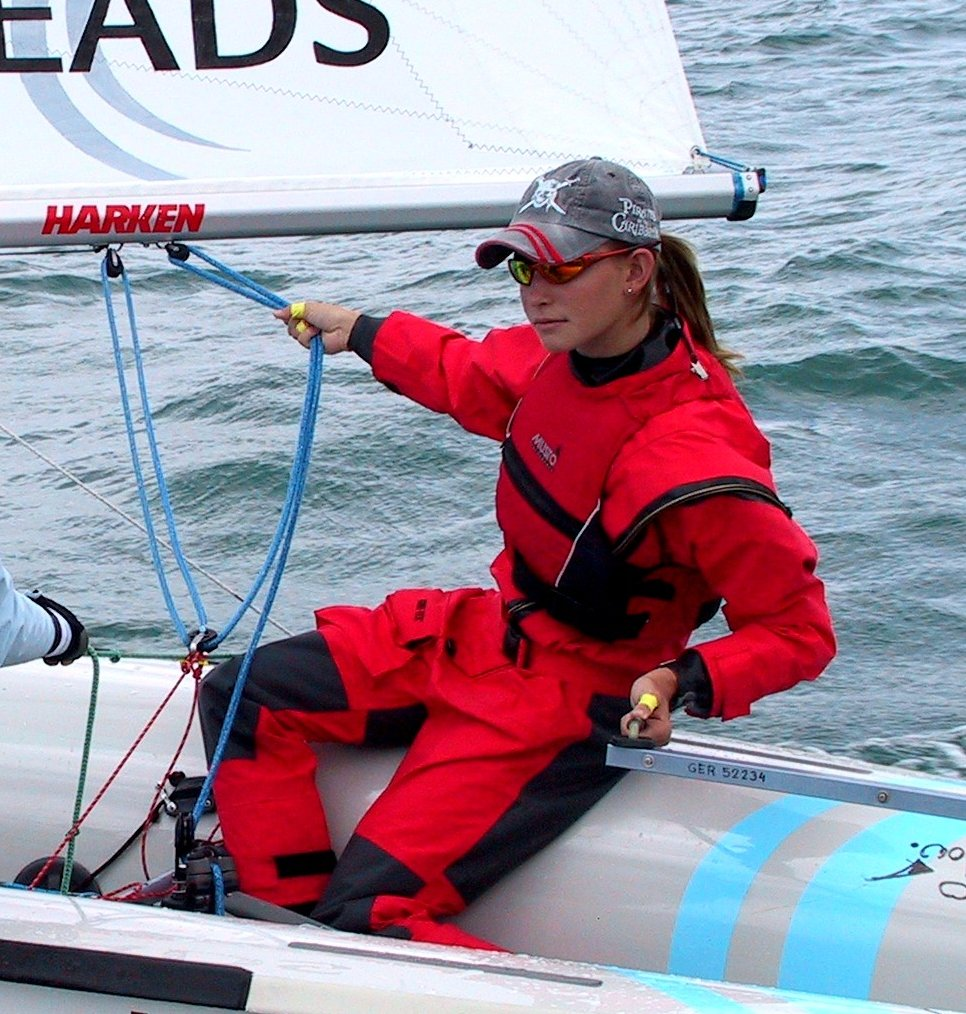
- Lutz in 2006

Personal information
- Nationality: German
- Born: 25 October 1990 (age 35) Munich, Bavaria, Germany
- Height: 1.69 m (5 ft 7 in)

Sailing career
- Sport: Sailing
- Classes: 470, 49er FX, 420, Optimist
Medal record
Women's sailing
Representing Germany
Olympic Games
Silver medal – second place	2020 Tokyo	49er FX
World Championships
Gold medal – first place	2005 Sankt Moritz	Optimist
European Championships
Gold medal – first place	2017 Geelong	49er FX
Gold medal – first place	2020 Lake Attersee	49er FX

Tina Lutz (born 25 October 1990) is a German sailor who has competed in the Optimist and 49er FX categories. Along with Susann Beucke, she won a gold medal at the 2017 and 2020 49er & 49er FX European Championships, having won a gold medal at the 2005 Optimist World Championship. Beucke and Lutz qualified to represent Germany at the 2020 Summer Olympics in Tokyo, competing in 49er FX.
