= Anna Yamazaki =

Japanese sailor

Personal information
- Nationality: Japanese
- Born: 19 December 1999 (age 25); Yokohama, Japan

Sailing career
- Class: 49er FX

Anna Yamazaki (born 19 December 1999) is a Japanese sailor. She competed in the 49er FX event at the 2020 Summer Olympics.
