= Freya Black =

British sailor (born 2001)

Freya Black OLY
Personal information
- Nationality: British
- Born: 22 May 2001 (age 25) Redhill, Surrey, England

Sailing career
- Sport: Sailing
- Class: 49erFX
Medal record
Sailing
Representing Great Britain
49erFX European Championship
Bronze medal – third place	2024 La Grande-Motte France	49erFX

Freya Black OLY (born 22 May 2001) is a British sailor who won a bronze medal at the 2024 49erFX European Championship. She represented Great Britain at the 2024 Summer Olympics.

== Career ==
Having got her first taste of sailing with her two older sisters at the age of nine, Black had a stellar junior career which included becoming a national and European champion.

In 2022 she moved into the senior ranks and was paired with Saskia Tidey in the women's 49erFX.

The duo won gold at the Lanzarote International Regatta in February 2023. They then finished fifth at the 2023 Sailing World Championships in The Hague, Netherlands, during the following month in a result which qualified the boat for the 2024 Summer Olympics.

In October 2023, Black's place at the Olympics in Paris was officially confirmed when the Great Britain sailing squad was announced by Team GB.

In February 2024, Black was named in the Athena Pathway team for the inaugural Women's America's Cup to be held in Barcelona, Spain, in September and October that year.

Alongside Tidey, she came 14th at 49erFX World Championship in Lanzarote, Spain, in March 2024.

Black won her first major senior medal in May 2024, when she and Tidey took bronze at the 49erFX European Championship in La Grande-Motte, France.

At the Olympics in July 2024, Black and Tidey missed out on a place in the 10-boat medal race, finishing 16th.

== Personal life ==
Black is a philosophy, politics and economics student at the University of Exeter but paused her studies to focus on her Olympic ambitions.
