= Sandra Jankowiak =

Polish sailor (born 1996)

Personal information
- Born: 12 January 1996 (age 30) Szamotuły, Poland

Sailing career
- Country: Poland
- Sport: Sailing
- Class: 49erFX

Sandra Jankowiak (born 12 January 1996 in Szamotuły) is a Polish sailor and Olympian from the 2024 Summer Olympics in Paris.

== Career ==
Jankowiak began practicing sailing at age eight. She also trained in athletics. In the triple jump, she won a silver medal at the Polish Youth Olympics in 2013 and the Polish Junior Championships (U20) in 2014, as well as an indoor silver medal at the Polish Junior Championships (U20) in 2014 and a bronze medal at the indoor Polish Championships (U20) in 2015. Her personal best was 12.20 m (25 January 2014).

In 2017, she represented Poland in the 49erFX sailing class, finishing 41st at the European Championships and 50th at the World Championships (with Sara Piasecka). However, she interrupted her sailing career and returned in 2021, competing with Aleksandra Melzacka. She participated in the European Championships in 2021 (6th place), 2022 (20th place), 2023 (5th place), and 2024 (4th place), as well as the World Championships in 2022 (4th place), 2023 (22nd place), and 2024 (10th place), and at the 2024 Summer Olympics in Paris, finishing 18th.

In 2020, she graduated from the Poznań University of Technology.
