= Anouk Geurts =

Belgian sailor (born 1993)

Personal information
- Nationality: Belgian
- Born: 3 April 2000 (age 26) Ghent, Belgium

Sailing career
- Sport: Sailing
- Class: 49er FX
Medal record
Representing Belgium
European Championships
| Gold medal – first place | 2024 La Grande-Motte | 49er FX |
| Bronze medal – third place | 2025 Thessaloniki | 49er FX |

Anouk Geurts (3 April 2000) is a Belgian sailor. She has competed in the 49 FX class at the 2020 Summer Olympics together with Isaura Maenhaut.

== Career ==
Geurts started her career in the small Optimist class at the age of 10. She then progressed to the Laser 4.7 class, where she became Belgian and European champion in 2016.

Having been on different Nacra 17 crews as part of a project in the run-up for the 2020 Summer Olympics, Geurts and Maenhaut were finally put together in 2018 in the 49er FX class after the Nacra 17 project was stopped because of several injuries. They finished 31st at the 2020 World Championships and secured their Olympic ticket for Tokyo at the 2021 Lanzarote sailing competition. They finished 14th in Tokyo. By finishing 4th at the 2023 World Championships in The Hague, The Netherlands, they secured their Olympic ticket for the 2024 Summer Olympics in Paris, France.

Geurts and Maenhaut won the 49er FX European Championships in 2024 in La Grande-Motte, France.

== Personal life ==
Geurts lives in Schoten and studies psychology.

== Awards ==
- 2016: Young Sailor of the Year award from Belgian Sailing
- 2019: Sailing Team of the Year award from Belgian Sailing
