= Rebecca Netzler =

Swedish sailor

Personal information
- Nationality: Swedish
- Born: 22 July 1995 (age 30) Östersund, Sweden

Sailing career
- Sport: Sailing
- Class: 49er FX
Medal record
Women's sailing
Representing Sweden
Olympic Games
Silver medal – second place	2024 Paris	49er FX
World Championships
Gold medal – first place	2023 The Hague	49er FX

Rebecca Netzler (born 22 July 1995) is a Swedish sailor. She competed in the 49er FX event at the 2024 Summer Olympics, where she won the silver medal in the women's 49er FX event.

In 2022, Vilma Bobeck and Netzler coupled to sail in the 49er FX class. In August 2023, Bobeck and Netzler won the 2023 Sailing World Championships in The Hague.
