= 29er (dinghy) =

International racing sailing class

- Class symbol

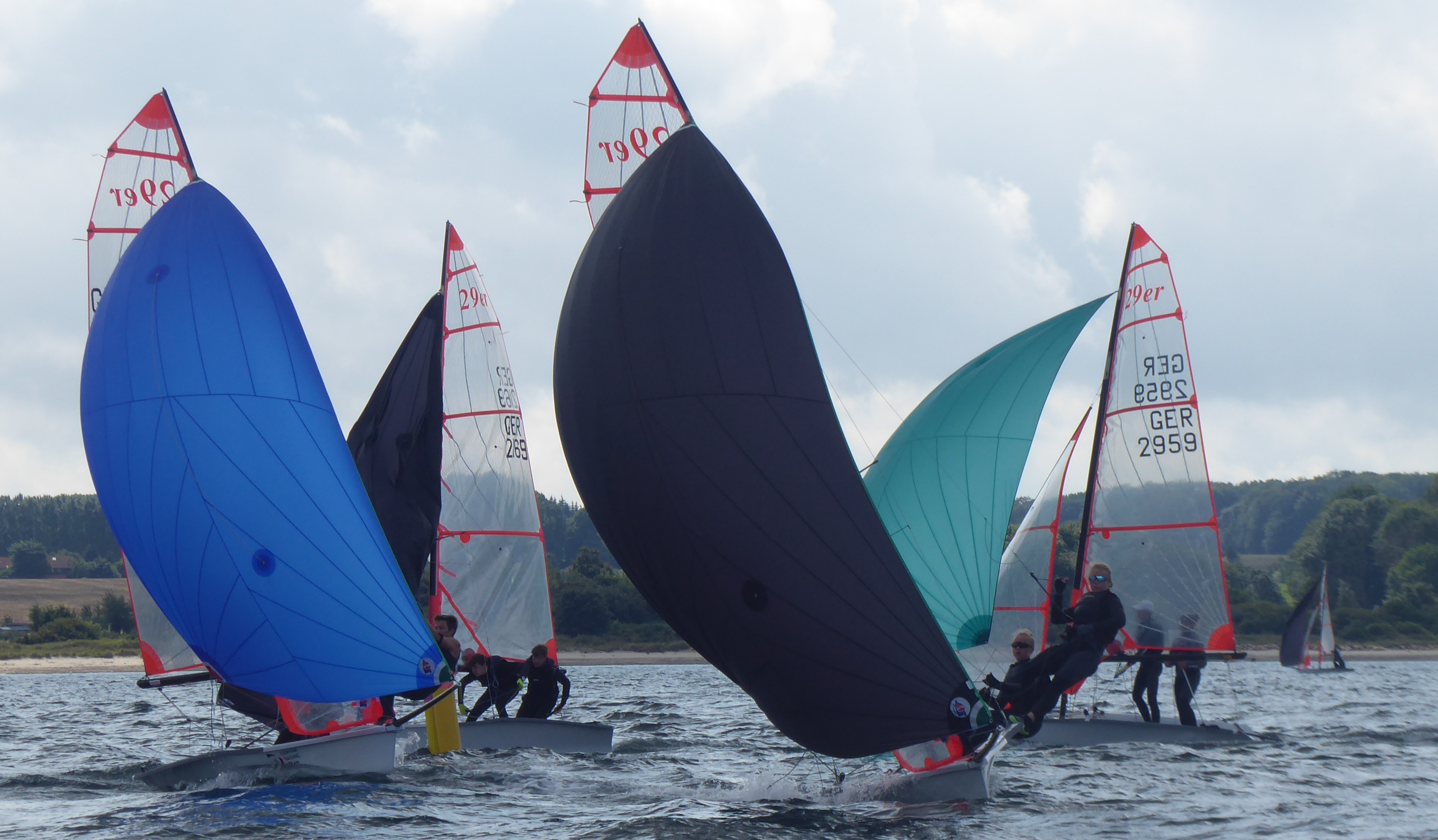

Boat
- Crew: 2 (single trapeze)

Hull
- Hull weight: 74 kg (163 lb)
- LOA: 4.40 m (14.4 ft)
- Beam: 1.70 m (5 ft 7 in)

Rig
- Mast height: 6.25 m (20.5 ft)

Sails
- Spinnaker area: 16.83 m^{2} (181.2 sq ft)
- Upwind sail area: 13.19 m^{2} (142.0 sq ft)

Racing
- D-PN: 84.5
- RYA PN: 902

The 29er is a two-person high performance sailing skiff designed by Julian Bethwaite and first produced in 1998. Derived from the Olympic class 49er class, it is raced in the ISAF Youth Sailing World Championships. The 29er is able to reach high speeds fairly quickly by having a sleek and hydrodynamic hull and will often exceed the wind speed when planing both up and downwind.

== Background ==
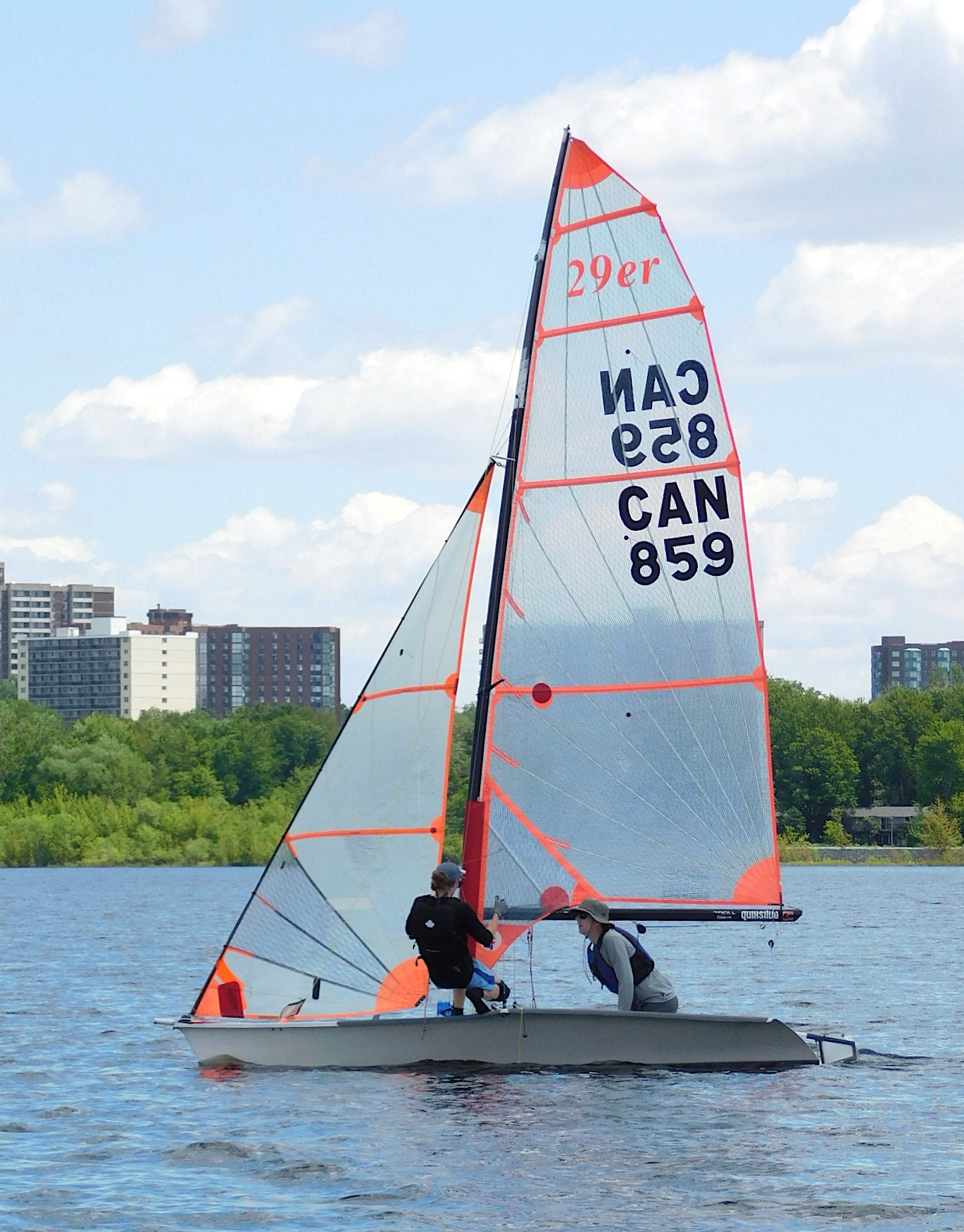
29er

The 29er class is targeted at youth, especially those training to sail the larger Olympic 49er. The Youth Sailing World Championships has adopted it to replace the Laser 2 - which was designed by Julian Bethwaite's father Frank.

The 29er has two sailors, one on trapeze. The rig features a fractional asymmetrical spinnaker; a self-tacking jib decreases the work load of the crew, making maneuvers more efficient and freeing the crew to take the mainsheet upwind and on two-sail reaches. The spinnaker rigging set-up challenges crews to be fit and coordinated, and maneuvers in the boat require athleticism due to its lack of inherent stability and the high speed with which the fully battened mainsail and jib power up.

The hull construction is of fibreglass-reinforced polyester in a foam sandwich layout. The fully battened mainsail and jib are made from a transparent Mylar laminate with orange or red Dacron trimming, while the spinnaker is manufactured from ripstop Nylon. The mast is in three parts - an aluminium bottom and middle section, with a polyester-fiberglass composite tip to increase mast bend and decrease both overall weight, and the capsizing moment a heavy mast tip can generate. Foils are aluminium or fibreglass.

The class has shown large popularity in Oceania with over 700 registered boats out of the 7000 registered worldwide.

== Events ==
=== Youth Sailing World Championships ===
The 29er has been used as equipment in the ISAF Youth Sailing World Championships.

==== Open ====
Year	Gold	Silver	Bronze
2010	France; Gael Jaffrezix; Julien Bloyet	New Zealand; Alex Maloney; Sam Bullock	United States; Antoine Screve; James Moody
2011	Spain; Carlos Robles; Florián Trittel	United States; Antoine Screve; Max Agnese	Netherlands; Max Deckers; Annette Duetz
2012	Spain; Carlos Robles; Florián Trittel	France; Lucas Rual; Thomas Biton	Argentina; Klaus Lange; Mateo Majdalani
2013	France; Lucas Rual; Émile Amoros	Sweden; Ida Svensson; Rasmus Rosengren	New Zealand; Markus Somerville; Jack Simpson
2014	France; Brice Yrieix; Loïc Fischer Guillou	United States; Quinn Wilson; Riley Gibbs	New Zealand; Markus Somerville; Isaac McHardie

==== Boys ====
Year	Gold	Silver	Bronze	Ref.
2002 Lunenburg (CAN)	Australia; Nathan Outteridge; Ayden Menzies	New Zealand; Geoffrey Woolley; Mark Overington	France; Guillaume Vigna; Thibaut Gatti	
2007 Kingston (CAN)	Denmark; Henrik Sogaard; Søren Kristensen	New Zealand; Paul Snow-Hansen; Blair Tuke	Great Britain; James Ellis; Rob Partridge	
2008 Århus (DEN)	Great Britain; James Peters; Edward FitzGerald	Argentina; Germán Billoch; Gastón Cheb Terrab	United States; Judge Ryan; Hans Henken	
2016 Auckland (NZL); 25 Nations	Great Britain; Crispin Beaumont; Tom Darling	France; Gwendal Nael; Lilian Mercier	Australia; John Cooley; Simon Hoffman	
2017 Sanya (CHN); 30 Nations	France; Théo Revil; Gautier Guevel	Norway; Mathias Berthet; Alexander Franks-Penty	Argentina; Santiago Duncan; Elías Dalli	
2018 Corpus Christi (USA); 25 Nations	Norway; Mathias Berthet; Alexander Franks-Penty	New Zealand; Seb Lardies; Scott McKenzie	Australia; Henry Larkings; Miles Davey	
2019 Gdynia (POL); 28 Nations	Norway; Mathias Berthet; Alexander Franks-Penty	Finland; Ville Korhonen; Edvard Bremer	Australia; Archie Cropley; Max Paul	
2021 Al-Mussanah (OMA); 24 Nations	France; Hugo Revil; Karl Devaux	Spain; Mateo Codoñer; Simón Codoñer	United States; Ian Nyenhuis; Noah Nyenhuis	
2022 The Hague (NED); 24 Nations	Argentina; Máximo Videla; Tadeo Funes	Great Britain; Santiago Sesto-Cosby; Leo Wilkinson	New Zealand; George Lee Rush; Seb Menzies	
2023 Búzios (BRA); 30 Nations	France; Hugo Revil; Karl Devaux	Italy; Alex Demurtas; Giovanni Santi	Ireland; Ben O'Shaughnessy; Ethan Spain	

==== Girls ====
Year	Gold	Silver	Bronze
2002	Great Britain; Pippa Wilson; Jenny Marks	Australia; Elise Rechichi; Rayshele Martin	New Zealand; Rachel O'Brien; Kelly Riechelmann
2007	United States; Emily Dellenbaugh; Briana Provancha	Great Britain; Sophie Weguelin; Sophie Ainsworth	Australia; Hannah Nattrass; Michelle Muller
2008	Great Britain; Frances Peters; Claire Lasko	Netherlands; Annemiek Bekkering; Jeske Kisters	Australia; Hannah Nattrass; Michelle Muller
2015	Finland; Sirre Kronlöf; Veera Hokka	Denmark; Lærke Graversen; Iben Nielsby Christensen	New Zealand; Greta Stewart; Kate Stewart
2016	Australia; Natasha Bryant; Annie Wilmot	Poland; Aleksandra Melzacka; Maja Micińska	New Zealand; Greta Stewart; Kate Stewart
2017 Sanya	Italy; Margherita Porro; Sofia Leoni	Russia; Zoya Novikova; Diana Sabirova	Australia; Jasmin May Galbraith; Chloe Fisher
2018 Corpus Christi	Norway; Pia Andersen; Nora Edland	United States; Berta Puig; Isabella Casaretto	Russia; Zoya Novikova; Diana Sabirova
2019 Gdynia	United States; Berta Puig; Isabella Casaretto	Malta; Antonia Schultheis; Victoria Schultheis	Sweden; Martina Carlsson; Amanda Ljunggren
2021 Al-Mussanah	Great Britain; Emily Mueller; Florence Brellisford	United States; Charlie Leigh; Sophie Fisher	Slovenia; Alja Petrič; Katja Filipič
2022 The Hague	Argentina; Amparo Stupenengo; Julia Pantin	France; Lucie Gout; Fleur Babin	Japan; Manase Ichihashi; Rinko Goto
2023 Búzios	Poland; Ewa Lewandowska; Julia Żmudzińska	France; Sarah Jannin; Fleur Babin	Hungary; Boróka Fehér; Szonja Fehér
2024 Lake Garda	Poland; Alicja Dampc; Alicja Tutkowska	Finland; Una Heinilä; Silja-Sophie Laukkanen	United States; Annie Sitzmann; Molly Bonham
2025 Vilamoura	Great Britain; Lila Edwards; Amelie Hiscocks	Poland; Antonina Puchowska; Alicja Dampc	Argentina; Carolina Barceló; Agustina Argüelles

== 29er XX and XS ==
Bethwaite and Jen Glass have also designed the 29erXX, a twin trapeze derivative of the 29er. It uses the same hull with some minor changes such as an extended gunwale and a rudder gantry, with a larger rig that includes a square-top main and masthead asymmetric spinnaker. The class became an International Sailing Federation recognised class in its own right in 2010.

In late 2012 Bethwaite announced another new version, the 29erXS, aimed at younger and/or lighter sailors. The XS features a similar rig to the XX, but of smaller size fitted to a standard 29er hull and employing a single trapeze. The main being 4.29sqm and the jib 2.13sqm, the spinnaker is similarly downsized. The intention is that sailors can upgrade the rig when they are ready to move to full sized sails, and keep the hull, which will remain standard across all 29er variants.
