= Georgia Lewin-LaFrance =

Canadian sailor

Personal information
- Born: December 1, 1999 (age 26) Montreal, Quebec, Canada

Sport
- Sport: Sailing
Medal record
Women's Sailing
Representing Canada

Georgia Lewin-LaFrance (born December 1, 1999) is a Canadian sailor competing in the 49erFX event. Lewin-LaFrance competes in the event with her sister, Antonia Lewin-LaFrance. Lewin-LaFrance was born in Montreal, Quebec, and raised in Chester, Nova Scotia.

== Career ==
The Lewin-LaFrance sisters chose to focus on the 49erFX in 2018. Early in the 2024 season the LaFrance sisters finished fourth at the Princess Sofia Regatta. In March 2024, Lewin-LaFrance along with her sister finished in eighth place at the 2024 World Championships. This qualified the pair to compete at the 2024 Summer Olympics. In June 2024, Lewin-LaFrance was officially named to Canada's 2024 Olympic team.
