= Annemiek Bekkering =

Dutch competitive sailor

Personal information
- Born: 5 August 1991 (age 34) Veghel, Netherlands

Sailing career
- Sport: Sailing
- Class: 49er FX
Medal record
Women's sailing
Representing Netherlands
Olympic Games
Bronze medal – third place	2020 Tokyo	49er FX
World Championships
Gold medal – first place	2018 Aarhus	49er FX
Gold medal – first place	2019 Auckland	49er FX
European Championships
Gold medal – first place	2019 Weymouth	49er FX

Annemiek Bekkering (born 5 August 1991) is a Dutch former competitive sailor.

Bekkering competed at the 2016 Summer Olympics in Rio de Janeiro, in the women's 49er FX. At the following 2020 Olympics, she won a bronze medal together with Annette Duetz.

On 29 November 2021, she announced her retirement of the professional sailing sport.
