= Charlotte Dobson =

British sailor

Charlotte Fletcher-Scott (née Dobson, born 5 June 1986) is a British sailor who competed at the 2016 Summer Olympics and 2020 Summer Olympics.

== Personal life ==
Dobson was born on 5 June 1986 in Glasgow, Scotland. She studied psychology at the University of Edinburgh. In August 2021 she married fellow olympic sailor Dylan Fletcher.

== Sailing ==
Dobson was selected for the Scotland national squad at the age of 14. In 2001, she won a bronze medal at the Youth World Championship in the Laser Radial class; in 2002 and 2004 she won silver medals at the Championships. By 2005 she was ranked seventh in the ISAF world rankings and in 2007 finished tenth in the ISAF World Championships held in Portugal. She was shortlisted for the Great Britain team for the 2008 Summer Olympics in Beijing, China, but missed out on selection to Penny Clark.

In 2010, she took the silver medal at the Laser Radial European Championships held in Estonia. At the 2011 ISAF Sailing World Championships Dobson finished 16th in the women's Laser Radial event. She attempted to qualify for the 2012 Summer Olympics in the individual Laser Radial but was beaten to selection for the Great Britain team by Alison Young after Young finished ahead of her in the Olympic regatta at Hyères.

In 2013, she teamed up with Sophie Ainsworth to compete in the 49er FX classification. The pair won a bronze medal at the World Cup event in Mallorca. They then finished sixth at the 2014 49er European Championships held in Helsinki, Finland.

At the 2015 49er FX World Championships, held in San Isidro, Argentina, Dobson and Ainsworth finished in fifth place, four points behind the medal positions.

In March 2016, Dobson and Ainsworth were selected as part of the Great Britain team for the 2016 Summer Olympics to be held in Rio de Janeiro, Brazil, where they competed in the women's 49er FX event, which made its debut at the Games. In April at the Princess Sofia Trophy in Palma, Majorca the pair finished fifth in the opening race before suffering problems with their equipment in race two. They eventually placed sixth overall after taking second place in the final race. Later that month at the 49er European Championships in Barcelona, Spain, Ainsworth and Dobson were joint third after the second day of competition where they finished their three races, first, second and third. A victory in the final medal race meant they eventually finished ninth overall, and seventh among European boats.

Dobson who along with crew Saskia Tidey have represent Great Britain at the Sailing at the 2020 Summer Olympics in the Women's 49er FX class finishing 6th.
