= Isaura Maenhaut =

Belgian sailor (born 1993)

Personal information
- Nationality: Belgian
- Born: 24 December 1998 (age 27) Bruges, Belgium

Sailing career
- Sport: Sailing
- Class: 49er FX
Medal record
Representing Belgium
European Championships
| Gold medal – first place | 2024 La Grande-Motte | 49er FX |
| Bronze medal – third place | 2025 Thessaloniki | 49er FX |

Isaura Maenhaut van Lemberge (born 24 December 1998) is a Belgian sailor. She has competed in the 49 FX class at the 2020 Summer Olympics together with Anouk Geurts.

== Career ==
Maenhaut started her career in the small Optimist class, competing in European and World championships for this youth category. She then progressed to the Laser 4.7 class, where she became Belgian champion. At the 2015 Youth Sailing World Championships in Medemblik, she won the bronze medal. In the next category, the Laser Radial, she again became Belgian champion.

Her first two-person competitions were with the Nacra 15 boat, which she sailed together with Henri Demesmaeker. Together they won the bronze medal at the 2016 Youth World Championships in Auckland. After a year in the Nacra 17 she then switched to the 49 FX.

Maenhaut and Geurts have sailed together since 2018. They finished 31st at the 2020 World Championships and secured their Olympic ticket at the 2021 Lanzarote sailing competition. They finished 14th in Tokyo. By finishing 4th at the 2023 World Championships in The Hague, The Netherlands, they secured their Olympic ticket for their second Olympics in Paris, France.

Maenhaut and Geurts won the 49er FX European Championships in 2024 in La Grande-Motte, France.

== Personal life ==
Maenhaut lives in Merelbeke and studies nautical sciences.

== Awards ==
- 2015: Young Sailor of the Year award from Belgian Sailing
- 2019: Sailing Team of the Year award from Belgian Sailing
