= Émile Amoros =

French sailor

Personal information
- Nationality: French
- Born: 26 August 1995 (age 31) Saint-Sébastien-sur-Loire

Sport
- Sport: Sailing

Émile Amoros (born 26 August 1995) is a French sailor. He competed in the 49er event at the 2020 Summer Olympics, placing 15th in a field of 19.
