= David Hussl =

Austrian sailor

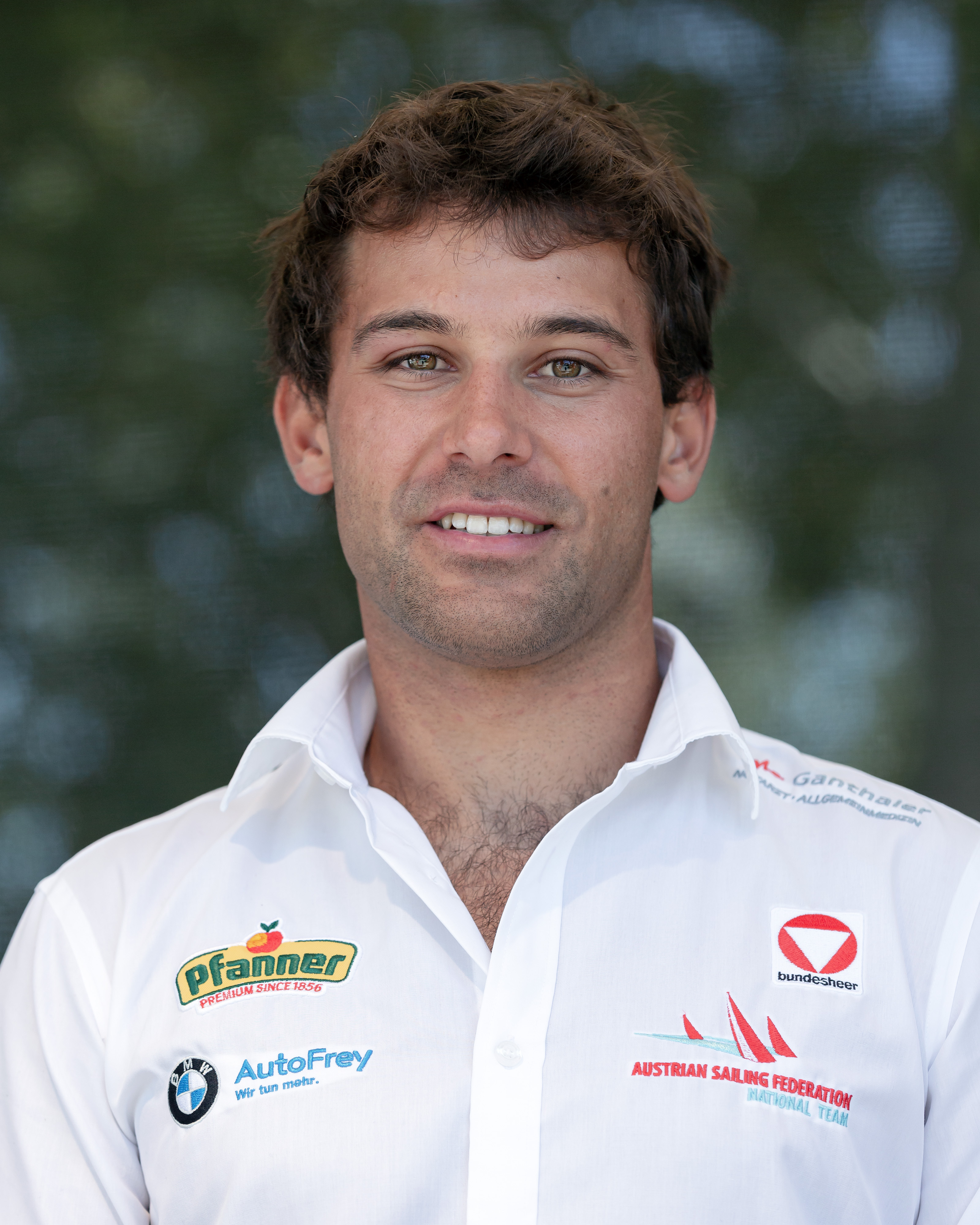
- Hussl in 2019

Personal information
- Nationality: Austrian
- Born: 23 February 1992 (age 33)

Sport
- Sport: Sailing

David Hussl (born 23 February 1992) is an Austrian sailor. He competed in the 49er event at the 2020 Summer Olympics, finishing 10th.
