= Saskia Tidey =

Irish/British sailor

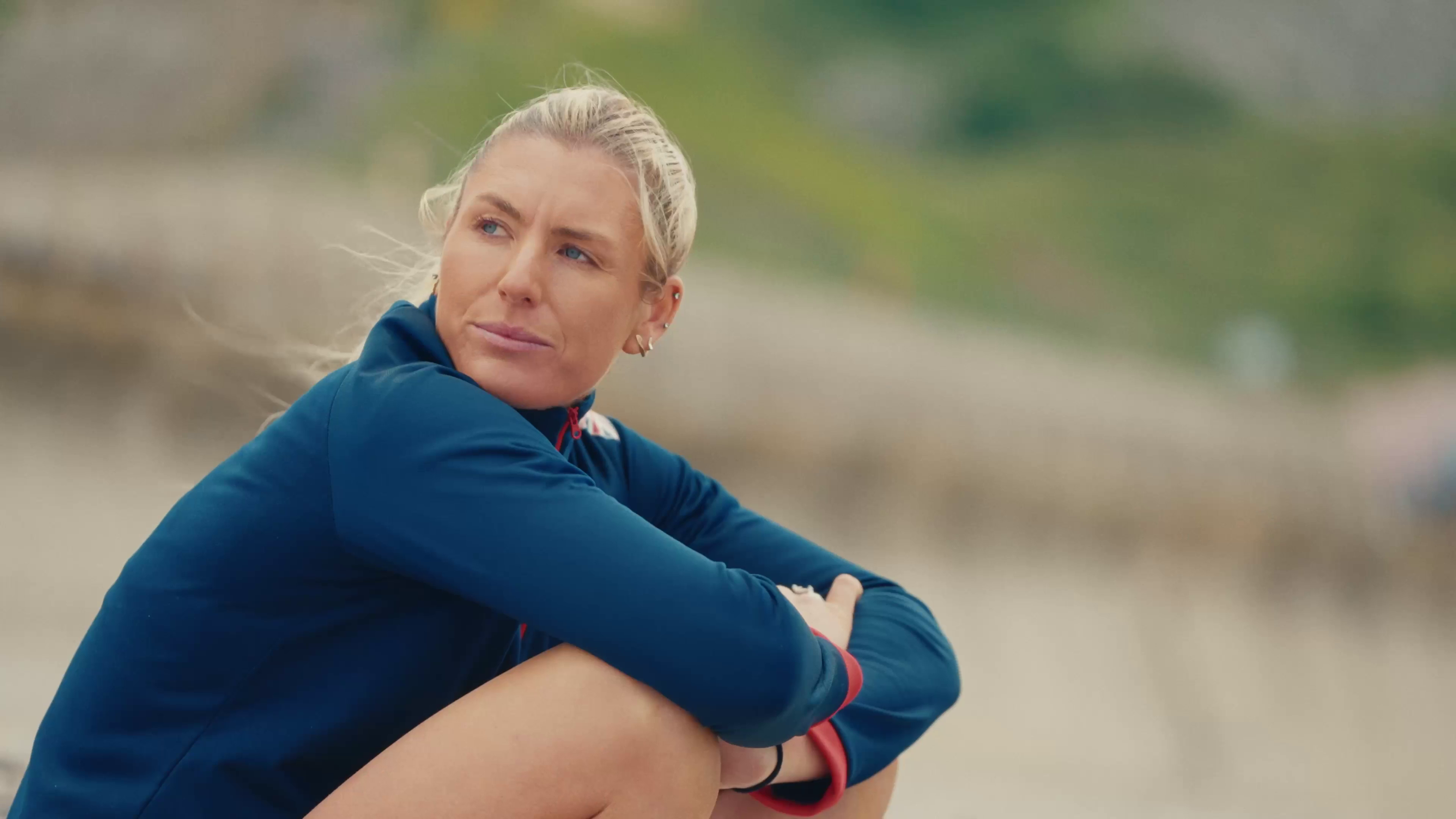
- Tidey in 2024

Personal information
- Born: 11 June 1993 (age 33) Dublin, Ireland
- Home town: Portland, Dorset, England
- Height: 183 cm (6 ft 0 in)
- Weight: 70 kg (154 lb)

Sailing career
- Country: Ireland; Great Britain
- Sport: Sailing

Saskia Tidey (born 11 June 1993 in Dublin, Ireland) is a sailor who has represented both Ireland and Great Britain in international sailing regattas.

Tidey represented Ireland at the 2016 Summer Olympics in the 49er FX class.

In January 2017, Tidey confirmed that she hoped to represent Great Britain at the 2020 Summer Olympics due to the retirement of sailing partner Andrea Brewster and the unavailability of another suitable partner in Ireland for the 49er FX skiff event. She qualified to represent Great Britain through her British-born father Don Tidey. On 1 October, the British Olympic Association confirmed that Tidey had been selected to represent Great Britain at the 2020 Summer Olympics in the 49er FX skiff class alongside Charlotte Dobson. They finished 6th in their event in Tokyo.

With Dobson retiring after the Olympics, Tidey paired with Freya Black in the women's 49er FX in 2022. The duo won gold at the Lanzarote International Regatta in February 2023. They then finished fifth at the 2023 Sailing World Championships in The Hague, Netherlands, during the following month in a result which qualified the boat for the 2024 Summer Olympics.

In October 2023, Tidey's place at the Olympics in Paris was officially confirmed when the Great Britain sailing squad was announced by Team GB.

Alongside Black, she came 14th at 49erFX World Championship in Lanzarote, Spain, in March 2024.

Tidey and Black took bronze at the 49er FX European Championship in La Grande-Motte, France, in May 2024.

At the 2024 Olympics, Tidey and Black missed out on a place in the 10-boat medal race, finishing 16th. She was a member of the team of women who competed for the Women's America's Cup. Other team members were Tash Bryant, Hattie Rogers, Anna Burnet and Ellie Aldridge and they were captained by Hannah Mills. The team made it through the heats and their boat Athena Pathway was beaten in the finals in October by the Italians.
