= Sarah Steyaert =

French sailor

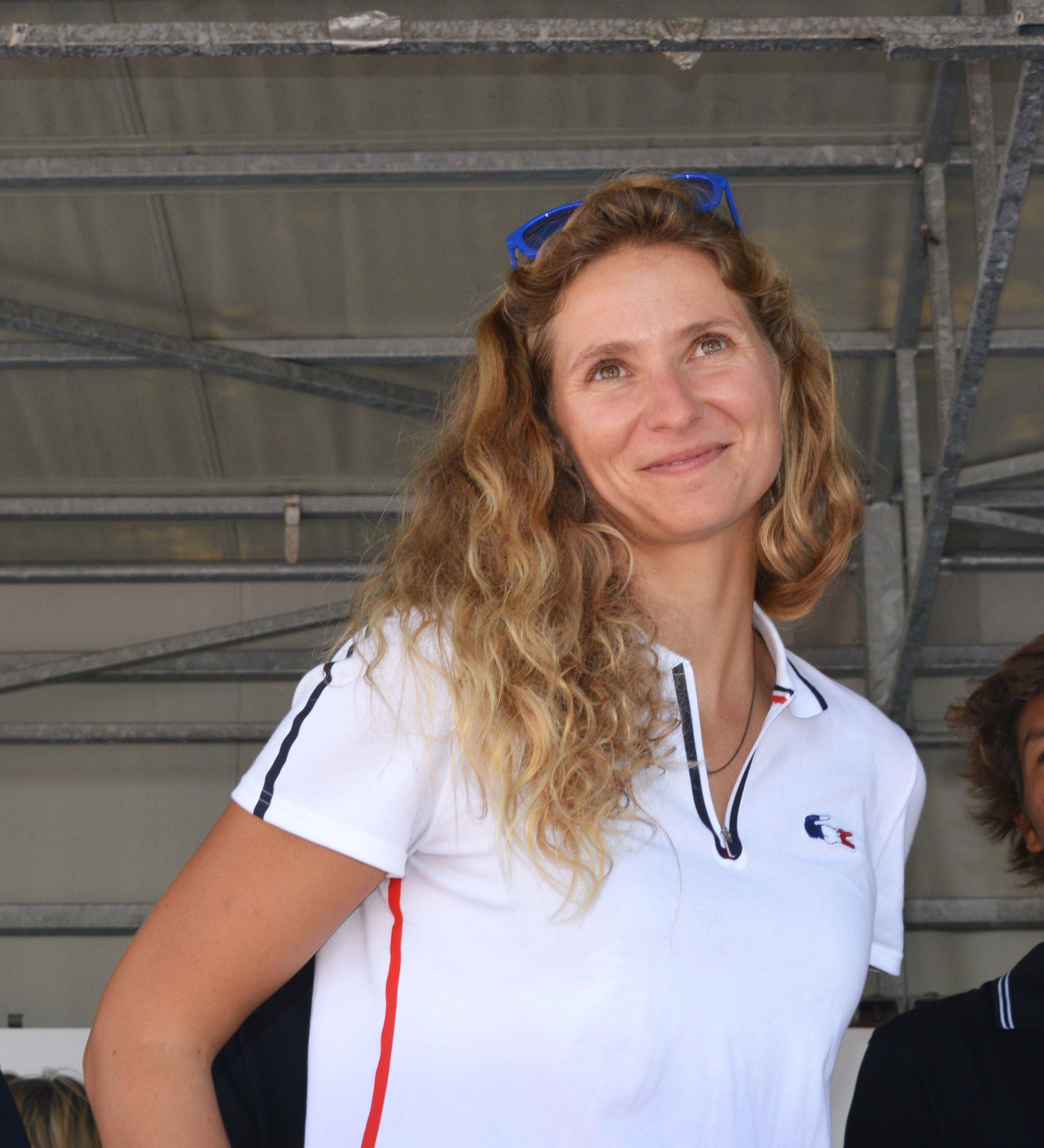
- Steyaert in 2016

Personal information
- Full name: Sarah Andréa Steyaert
- Born: 27 November 1986 (age 39) Bordeaux, France
- Height: 1.76 m (5 ft 9 in)
- Weight: 69 kg (152 lb)

Sport
- Club: La Rochelle Nautique
Medal record
Sailing
Representing France
Olympic Games
Bronze medal – third place	2024 Paris	49er FX
World Championships
Gold medal – first place	2008 Auckland	Laser Radial
Youth Sailing World Championships
Gold medal – first place	2004	Laser Radial

Sarah Andréa Steyaert (born 27 November 1986, in Bordeaux) is a French sports sailor. The 2008 world champion in the Laser Radial, she finished in 5th place at the 2008 Summer Olympics. At the 2012 Summer Olympics, she competed in the Women's Laser Radial class, finishing in 16th place.

She also competed in the 49er FX class at the 2016 Summer Olympics and earned a bronze medal in the same class at the 2024 Summer Olympics.
