= Paula Barceló =

Spanish sailor

Personal information
- Full name: Paula Sandra Barcelo Martín
- Nationality: Spanish
- Born: 13 March 1996 (age 30) Palma de Mallorca, Spain

Sailing career
- Sport: Sailing
- Club: Club Náutico El Arenal
Medal record
Women's Sailing
Representing Spain
World Championships
Gold medal – first place	2020 Geelong	49er FX

Paula Sandra Barcelo Martín (born 13 March 1996) is a Spanish sailor who has competed in the Optimist, 470 and 49er FX categories. Along with Támara Echegoyen, she won a gold medal at the 2020 49er & 49er FX World Championships.

Barcelo will be at the 2024 Olympics and she is then committed to join a team for the (first) women's Americas Cup in 2024. The team consists of Támara Echegoyen, Silvia Mas, María Cantero, Neus Ballester and Paula Barceló.
