= Annette Duetz =

Dutch competitive sailor

Personal information
- Born: 29 June 1993 (age 33) Zeddam, the Netherlands

Sailing career
- Sport: Sailing
- Class: 49er FX
Medal record
Women's sailing
Representing Netherlands
Olympic Games
Gold medal – first place	2024 Paris	49er FX
Bronze medal – third place	2020 Tokyo	49er FX
World Championships
Gold medal – first place	2018 Aarhus	49er FX
Gold medal – first place	2019 Auckland	49er FX
Gold medal – first place	2022 St. Margarets Bay	49er FX
Gold medal – first place	2024 Lanzarote	49er FX
Silver medal – second place	2023 The Hague	49er FX
European Championships
Gold medal – first place	2019 Weymouth	49er FX
Gold medal – first place	2022 Aarhus	49er FX
- Updated on 8 March 2023

Annette Duetz (born 29 June 1993 in Zeddam) is a sailor from the Netherlands. Together with Annemiek Bekkering, she is the bronze medalist of the 2020 Summer Olympics in Skiff – 49er FX. She is, together with Odile van Aanholt, the gold medalist of the 2024 Paris Olympics in the woman's 49er FX.

Bekkering and Duetz qualified for the 2016 Summer Olympics in Skiff – 49er FX. They earlier lost the national selection to Nina Keizer en Claire Blom, but Keizer and Blom failed to fulfill the qualification criteria of NOC/NSF. At the Olympics, Bekkering and Duetz finished in the seventh position.

Since 2011, Duetz studied applied physics at Delft University of Technology.
