= Aleksandra Melzacka =

Polish sailor

Personal information
- Nationality: Polish
- Born: 5 May 1998 (age 26); Gdynia, Poland

Sport
- Sport: Sailing

Aleksandra Melzacka (born 5 May 1998) is a Polish sailor. She competed in the 49er FX event at the 2020 Summer Olympics.
