= 49er (dinghy) =

Olympic sailing class

- Class symbol

Boat
- Crew: 2 (double trapeze)
- Draft: 1,447 mm (4 ft 9 in)

Hull
- Hull weight: 94 kg (207 lb)
- LOA: 4,876 mm (16 ft)
- Beam: without wings: 1,752 mm (5 ft 9 in) with wings: 2,743 mm (9 ft 0 in)

Sails
- Spinnaker area: 37.16 m^{2} (400 sq ft)
- Upwind sail area: 19.97 m^{2} (215 sq ft)

Rating
- D-PN: 68.2
- RYA PN: 710

The 49er is a double-handed skiff-type high-performance sailing dinghy. The two crew work on different roles with the helm making many tactical decisions, as well as steering, and the crew doing most of the sail control. Both of the crew are equipped with their own trapeze and sailing is done while cantilevered over the water to the fullest extent to balance against the sails.

The 49er was designed by Julian Bethwaite (the son of Frank Bethwaite) and developed by a consortium consisting of Bethwaites, Performance Sailcraft Japan, Peter Johnston, and Ovington boats. The boat has been an Olympic class since it was selected by the International Sailing Federation to be the men's high performance double handed dinghy Sydney Summer Games of 2000. Its derivative featuring a re-designed rig, the 49er FX, was selected by World Sailing to be the women's high performance double-hander at the Rio Summer Olympics of 2016.

== History ==
The 49er's name comes from its hull length of 4.99 metres (16 ft 4 in). It incorporates ideas developed in Julian Bethwaite's 18ft Skiffs, notably the Prime Computer series of boats, which were double handers.

To handle a large and powerful sail area, the mast uses a square topped sail that causes the upper main to twist off and flatten, allowing a controllable sail with fast gust response and reducing the heeling moment. The use of solid wings, rather than tubes as on similar boats (RS800 etc.), makes it easier for the crew to run across the deck from gunwale to gunwale during maneuvers.

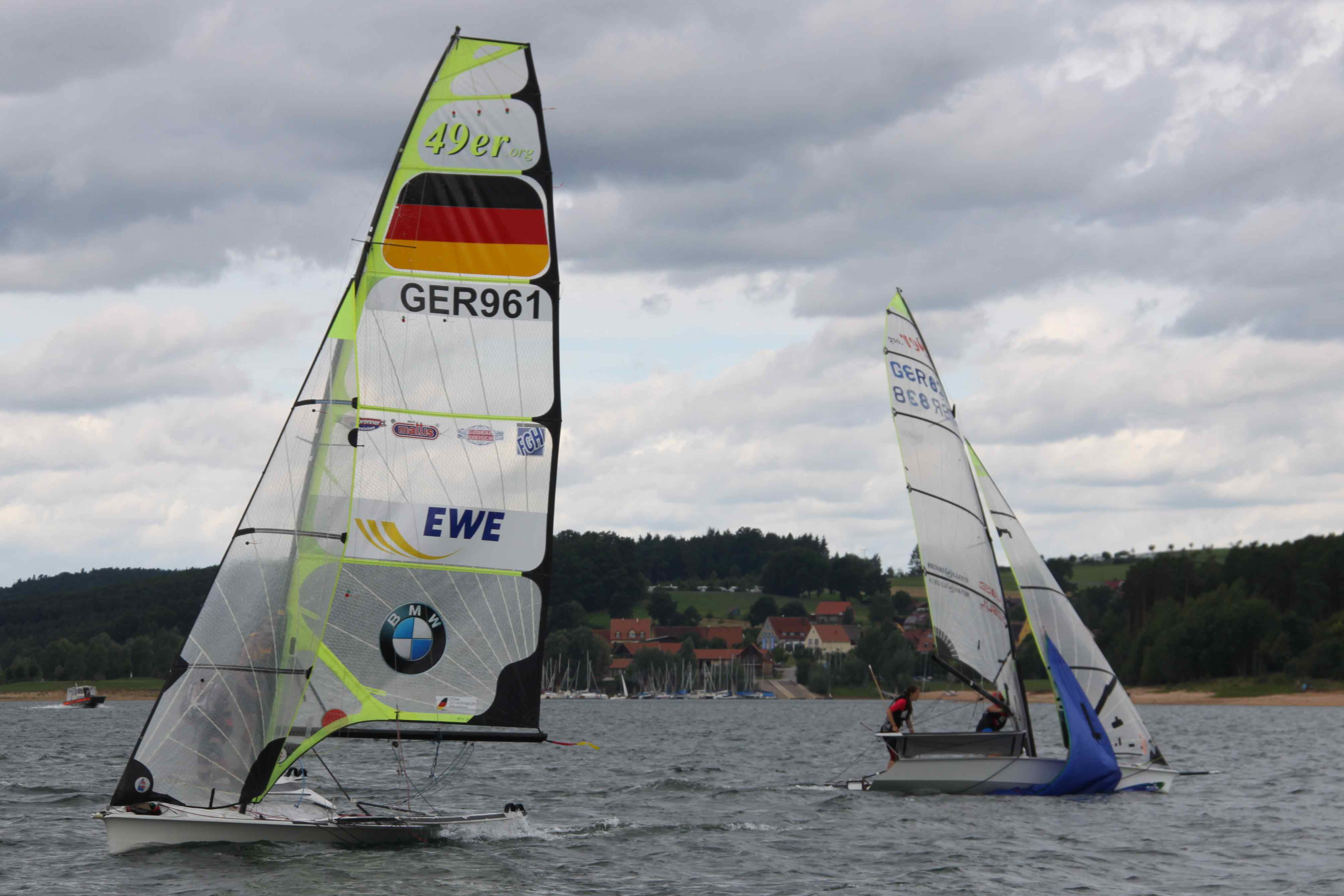
49er skiffs in a race

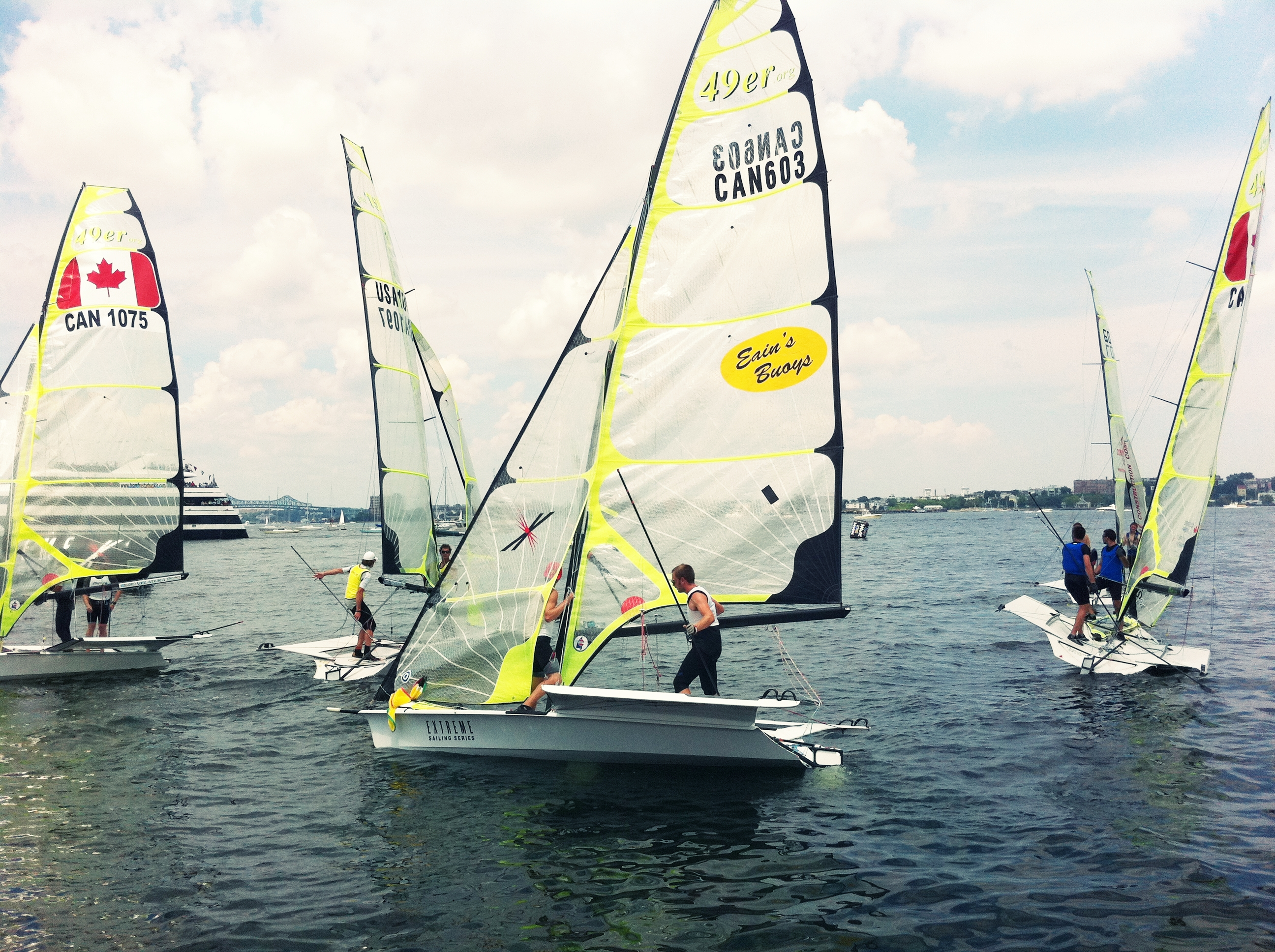
49ers at the Extreme Sailing Series in Boston harbor preparing to race, 4th of July, 2011

The 49er made its first Olympic appearance at the Sydney Olympics in 2000 and has continued to grow in popularity ever since.

With a Portsmouth yardstick Handicap of 740 the 49er is the fastest two person one-design monohull dinghy.

In 2009 the boat received a new rig design, including a larger fully carbon mast (replacing the aluminum mast) and square top (roach) mainsail.

== Construction ==
As a one design class, the 49er has two licensed suppliers, Mackay Boats in Oceania and Ovington in Europe.

=== Hull ===
The hull is made of Epoxy GRP and foam sandwich laminate with carbon fibre in high load areas. It includes two solid wings, also called racks, that clip into the side to increase righting moment of the trapezing crew. Its length was fixed at 4.99 metres because the ISAF brief for the high performance Olympic class dinghy called for a 5-metre boat, but Tokao Otani, a member of the development consortium, pointed out that there was a tariff in Japan for boats over 5 metres long. It has a fine entry to efficiently transition between the low speed displacement, and high speed planing modes. According to the International 49er class rules, the minimum hull weight including all permanent fittings can not be less than 94.0 kg.

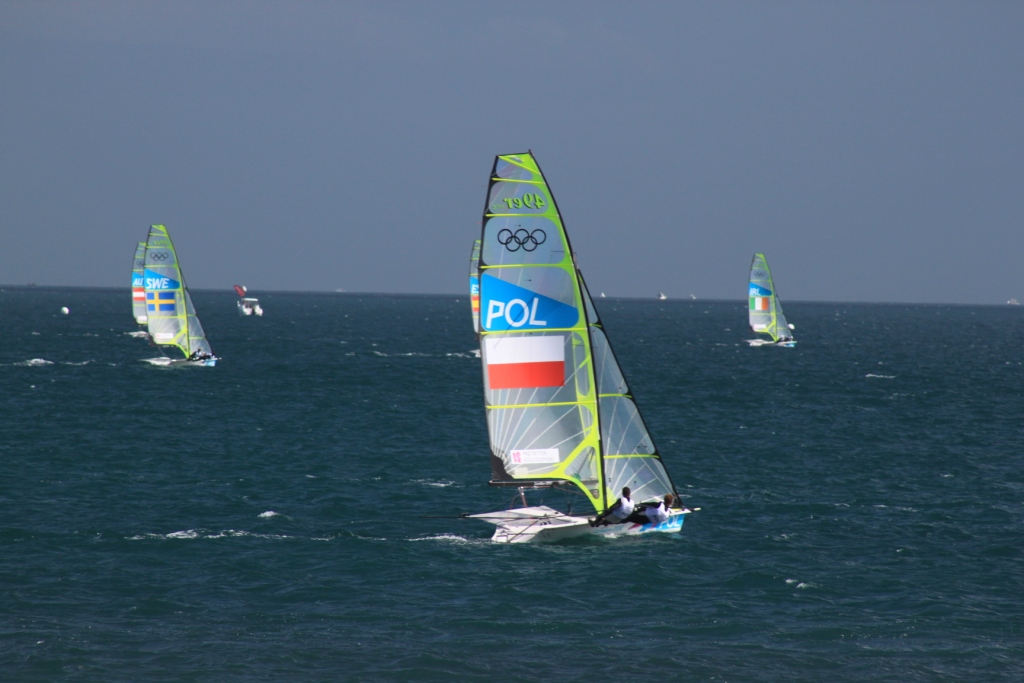
49er at the 2012 London Olympic Games

=== Spars ===
Southern Spars, part of the North Technology Group, is the licensed supplier of the 49er mast. It is a three piece male-moulded assembly made from 100% standard modulus carbon. It is 7.0 metres tall and capable of supporting a combined crew weight up to 165 kg from its dual trapeze. The mast is braced by three sets of shrouds that connect to a fitting on the side of the boat. The crew is able to adjust them by tightening or loosening them, depending on the wind speed and sea states.

The boom is made from an aluminium alloy extrusion.

=== Foils ===
The rudder and daggerboard are made from a composite of epoxy, carbon and glass, covered by a hard gelcoat surface. The head of each class legal foil carries the embossed 49er logo and the ICA label.

=== Sails ===
The 49er carries three sails: a mainsail, jib, and gennaker. The main and jib combined are 20 square metres, fully battened and made of reinforced Mylar (film polyester). The main was redesigned in 2007 from a full, curved roach plan to having a square on top in order to provide more sail area and to control more shape adjustment. The gennaker is 38 square metres in a tri-radial asymmetric shape.

== Events ==
=== Olympics ===
==== Men's 49er ====
Games	Gold	Silver	Bronze
2000 Sydney	Finland; Thomas Johanson; Jyrki Järvi	Great Britain; Ian Barker; Simon Hiscocks	United States; Jonathan McKee; Charlie McKee
2004 Athens	Spain; Iker Martínez; Xabier Fernández	Ukraine; Rodion Luka; George Leonchuk	Great Britain; Chris Draper; Simon Hiscocks
2008 Beijing	Denmark; Jonas Warrer; Martin Kirketerp	Spain; Iker Martínez; Xabier Fernández	Germany; Jan-Peter Peckolt; Hannes Peckolt
2012 London	Australia; Nathan Outteridge; Iain Jensen	New Zealand; Peter Burling; Blair Tuke	Denmark; Allan Nørregaard; Peter Lang
2016 Rio de Janeiro	New Zealand; Peter Burling; Blair Tuke	Australia; Nathan Outteridge; Iain Jensen	Germany; Erik Heil; Thomas Plößel
2020 Tokyo	Great Britain; Dylan Fletcher; Stuart Bithell	New Zealand; Peter Burling; Blair Tuke	Germany; Erik Heil; Thomas Plößel
2024 Paris	Spain; Diego Botín; Florián Trittel	New Zealand; Isaac McHardie; William McKenzie	United States; Ian Barrows; Hans Henken
2028 Los Angeles			

==== Women's 49er FX ====
Games	Gold	Silver	Bronze
2016 Rio de Janeiro	Brazil; Martine Grael; Kahena Kunze	New Zealand; Alex Maloney; Molly Meech	Denmark; Jena Mai Hansen; Katja Salskov-Iversen
2020 Tokyo	Brazil; Martine Grael; Kahena Kunze	Germany; Tina Lutz; Susann Beucke	Netherlands; Annemiek Bekkering; Annette Duetz
2024 Paris	Netherlands; Odile van Aanholt; Annette Duetz	Sweden; Vilma Bobeck; Rebecca Netzler	France; Sarah Steyaert; Charline Picon
2028 Los Angeles			

=== World Championships ===
and

== Related boats ==
The 49erFX was developed by Mackay Boats to be a women's Olympic class. It consists of a 49er hull, wings, and foils, with a scaled down rig designed to suit the weight of an elite female crew.

The 29er is a smaller, single trapeze trainer to the 49er. It has become popular in North America, Europe and Australia as a fast youth boat. Recently the 29erXX, a twin trapeze version of the 29er, has been produced with a rig very similar to the 49er.

The 59er dinghy was put into production in Australia and the UK in 2002. It is a non-trapeze, 4.7-metre (15 ft 5 in) sailing dinghy, rigged with an asymmetrical spinnaker. It is designed for a crew weight of 145 to 180 kg (320 to 400 lb).

The Musto Skiff is a single-handed skiff with a similar concept to the 49er: a flat hull, wings, an asymmetrical spinnaker, and one main sail (but no jib).
