= List of 49er class sailors at the Summer Olympics =

This is list of 49er class sailors at the Summer Olympics.

Year	Pos.	Name	Nationality
2000 Sydney Olympics
2000	Helm	Chris Nicholson	Australia
2000	Crew	Daniel Phillips	Australia
2000	Helm	Michael Hestbæk	Denmark
2000	Crew	Jonatan Aage Persson	Denmark
2000	Helm	Thomas Johanson	Finland
2000	Crew	Jyrki Järvi	Finland
2000	Helm	Dimitri Deruelle	France
2000	Crew	Philippe Gasparini	France
2000	Helm	Marcus Baur	Germany
2000	Crew	Philip Barth	Germany
2000	Helm	Ian Barker	Great Britain
2000	Crew	Simon Hiscocks	Great Britain
2000	Helm	Francesco Bruni	Italy
2000	Crew	Gabriele Bruni	Italy
2000	Helm	Kenji Nakamura	Japan
2000	Crew	Tomoyuki Sasaki	Japan
2000	Helm	Daniel Slater	New Zealand
2000	Crew	Nathan Handley	New Zealand
2000	Helm	Christoffer Sundby	Norway
2000	Crew	Vegard Arnhoff	Norway
2000	Helm	Pawel Kacprowski	Poland
2000	Crew	Pawel Kuzmicki	Poland
2000	Helm	Afonso Domingos	Portugal
2000	Crew	Diogo Cayolla	Portugal
2000	Helm	Santiago Lopez-Vazquez	Spain
2000	Crew	Javier de la Plaza	Spain
2000	Helm	John Harrysson	Sweden
2000	Crew	Patrik Sandström	Sweden
2000	Helm	Thomas Rueegge	Switzerland
2000	Crew	Claude Maurer	Switzerland
2000	Helm	Rodion Luka	Ukraine
2000	Crew	George Leonchuk	Ukraine
2000	Helm	Jonathan McKee	United States
2000	Crew	Charlie McKee	United States
2004 Athens Olympics
2004	Helm	Chris Nicholson	Australia
2004	Crew	Gary Boyd	Australia
2004	Helm	Nico Delle Karth	Austria
2004	Crew	Nikolaus Resch	Austria
2004	Helm	Andre Fonseca	Brazil
2004	Crew	Rodrigo Duarte	Brazil
2004	Helm	Michael Hestbæk	Denmark
2004	Crew	Dennis Dengsø Andersen	Denmark
2004	Helm	Thomas Johanson	Finland
2004	Crew	Jukka Piirainen	Finland
2004	Helm	Marc Audineau	France
2004	Crew	Stéphane Christidis	France
2004	Helm	Marcus Baur	Germany
2004	Crew	Max Groy	Germany
2004	Helm	Chris Draper	Great Britain
2004	Crew	Simon Hiscocks	Great Britain
2004	Helm	Athanasios Pachoumas	Greece
2004	Crew	Vasileios Portosalte	Greece
2004	Helm	Malav Shroff	India
2004	Crew	Sumeet Pate	India
2004	Helm	Tom Fitzpatrick	Ireland
2004	Crew	Fraser Brown	Ireland
2004	Helm	Pierto Sibello	Italy
2004	Crew	Gianfranco Sibello	Italy
2004	Helm	Kenji Nakamura	Japan
2004	Crew	Masato Takaki	Japan
2004	Helm	Christoffer Sundby	Norway
2004	Crew	Frode Bovim	Norway
2004	Helm	Marcin Czajkowski	Poland
2004	Crew	Krzysztof Kierkowski	Poland
2004	Helm	Iker Martínez	Spain
2004	Crew	Xabier Fernández	Spain
2004	Helm	Christopher Rast	Switzerland
2004	Crew	Christian Steiger	Switzerland
2004	Helm	Rodion Luka	Ukraine
2004	Crew	George Leonchuk	Ukraine
2004	Helm	Tim Wadlow	United States
2004	Crew	Pete Spaulding	United States

== 2008 Beijing ==
Helmsman	Crew	Nationality
Nathan Outteridge	Ben Austin	Australia
Nico Luca Marc Delle Karth	Nikolaus Resch	Austria
André Fonseca	Rodrigo Duarte	Brazil
Gordon Cook	Ben Remocker	Canada
Li Fei	Hu Xianqiang	China
Pavle Kostov	Petar Cupać	Croatia
Jonas Warrer	Martin Kirketerp Ibsen	Denmark
Emmanuel Dyen	Yann Rocherieux	France
Jan-Peter Peckolt	Hannes Peckolt	Germany
Stevie Morrison	Ben Rhodes	Great Britain
Pietro Sibello	Gianfranco Sibello	Italy
Akira Ishibashi	Yukio Makino	Japan
Christopher Gundersen	Frode Bovim	Norway
Marcin Czajkowski	Krzysztof Kiekowski	Poland
Jorge Lima	Francisco Andrade	Portugal
Iker Martínez	Xabier Fernández	Spain
Jonas Lindberg	Karl Torlén	Sweden
Rodion Luka	George Leonchuk	Ukraine
Tim Wadlow	Chris Rast	United States

== 2012 London ==
Helmsman	Crew	Nationality
Nathan Outteridge	Iain Jensen	Australia
Nico Delle Karth	Nikolaus Resch	Austria
Jesse Kirkland	Alexander Kirkland	Bermuda
Gordon Cook	Hunter Lowden	Canada
Pavle Kostov	Petar Cupać	Croatia
Allan Nørregaard	Peter Lang	Denmark
Lauri Lehtinen	Kalle Bask	Finland
Emmanuel Dyen	Stéphane Christidis	France
Tobias Schadewaldt	Hannes Baumann	Germany
Stevie Morrison	Ben Rhodes	Great Britain
Dionysios Dimou	Mike Pateniotis	Greece
Ryan Seaton	Matt McGovern	Ireland
Giuseppe Angilella	Gianfranco Sibello	Italy
Yukio Makino	Kenji Takahashi	Japan
Peter Burling	Blair Tuke	New Zealand
Łukasz Przybytek	Paweł Kołodziński	Poland
Bernardo Freitas	Francisco Andrade	Portugal
Iker Martínez	Xabier Fernández	Spain
Jonas von Geijer	Niclas Düring	Sweden
Erik Storck	Trevor Moore	United States

== 2016 Rio de Janeiro ==
Helmsman	Crew	Nationality
Yago Lange	Klaus Lange	Argentina
Iain Jensen	Nathan Outteridge	Australia
Nikolaus Resch	Nico Delle Karth	Austria
Tom Pelsmaekers	Yannick Lefebvre	Belgium
Marco Grael	Gabriel Borges	Brazil
Cristobal Grez Ahrens	Benjamin Grez Ahrens	Chile
Pavle Kostov	Petar Cupać	Croatia
Christian Peter Lubeck	Jonas Warrer	Denmark
Julien Dortoli	Noe Delpech	France
Erik Heil	Thomas Ploessel	Germany
Dylan Fletcher-Scott	Alain Sign	Great Britain
Matthew Mcgovern	Ryan Seaton	Ireland
Ruggero Tita	Pietro Zucchetti	Italy
Kenji Takahashi	Yukio Makino	Japan
Blair Tuke	Peter Burling	New Zealand
Pawel Kolodzinski	Lukasz Przybytek	Poland
Jorge Lima	José Costa	Portugal
Diego Botin	Iago Lopez Marra	Spain
Lucien Cujean	Sebastien Schneiter	Switzerland
Thomas Barrows	Joe Morris	United States

== 2020 Tokyo ==
Helmsman	Crew	Nationality
Sam Phillips	William Phillips	Australia
David Hussl	Benjamin Bildstein	Austria
Marco Grael	Gabriel Borges	Brazil
William Jones	Evan Depaul	Canada
Mihovil Fantela	Sime Fantela	Croatia
Jonas Warrer	Jakob Precht Jensen	Denmark
Emile Amoros	Lucas Rual	France
Erik Heil	Thomas Ploessel	Germany
Dylan Fletcher-Scott	Stuart Bithell	Great Britain
Varun Thakkar	Ganapathy Kelapanda	India
Robert Dickson	Sean Waddilove	Ireland
Ibuki Koizumi	Leo Takahashi	Japan
Bart Lambriex	Pim Van Vugt	Netherlands
Peter Burling	Blair Tuke	New Zealand
Pawel Kolodzinski	Lukasz Przybytek	Poland
Jose Costa	Jorge Lima	Portugal
Alex Burger	Benjamin Daniel	South Africa
Diego Botin	Iago Lopez Marra	Spain
Lucien Cujean	Sebastien Schneiter	Switzerland
