= 2014 ISAF Sailing World Championships – 49er =

49er at the 2014 ISAF Sailing World Championships
- Venue: Santander, Spain
- Dates: 16–21 September
- Competitors: 160 from 31 nations

Medalists
gold medal	Peter Burling; Blair Tuke	New Zealand
silver medal	Jonas Warrer; Anders Thomsen	Denmark
bronze medal	Nathan Outteridge; Iain Jensen	Australia

The men's 49er class at the 2014 ISAF Sailing World Championships was held in Santander, Spain 16–21 September.

== Results ==
Results of individual races
Pos	Crew	Country	I	II	III	IV	V	VI	VII	VIII	IX	X	XI	XII	MR	Tot	Pts
Gold medal	Peter Burling; Blair Tuke	New Zealand	1	4	6	1	4	1	8	2	1	1	DSQ 26^{†}	5	2	62	36
Silver medal	Jonas Warrer; Anders Thomsen	Denmark	33^{†}	11	3	3	3	9	13	3	7	4	3	11	12	115	82
Bronze medal	Nathan Outteridge; Iain Jensen	Australia	16	4	9	19	1	3	1	13	3	2	1	25^{†}	14	111	86
4	Nico Delle Karth; Nikolaus Resch	Austria	5	5	1	26^{†}	RDG 9.3	4	2	18	5	9	20	9	4	117.3	91.3
5	Jorge Lima; José Costa	Portugal	6	19^{†}	2	8	8	13	5	14	13	6	5	1	DPI 12	112	93
6	John Pink; Stuart Bithell	Great Britain	25^{†}	17	7	1	7	7	4	16	15	10	4	16	6	135	110
7	David Gilmour; Rhys Mara	Australia	16	3	19^{†}	4	1	19	11	5	19	17	10	3	8	135	116
8	Ryan Seaton; Matt McGovern	Ireland	2	15	37^{†}	2	14	11	9	6	2	13	12	18	18	159	122
9	Emmanuel Dyen; Stéphane Christidis	France	10	UFD 41^{†}	16	2	4	8	7	4	6	11	19	15	20	163	122
10	Carlos Paz; Antón Paz	Spain	7	23	14	DNF 41^{†}	3	2	24	8	11	3	2	23	16	177	136
11	Stephen Morrison; Chris Grube	Great Britain	17	12	35^{†}	11	6	18	19	11	4	12	6	12	–	163	128
12	Stefano Cherin; Andrea Tesei	Italy	2	15	5	12	10	6	23^{†}	17	9	18	13	22	–	152	129
13	Julien d'Ortoli; Noé Delpech	France	3	25^{†}	18	8	13	15	6	9	12	16	11	19	–	155	130
14	David Evans; Ed Powys	Great Britain	7	14	2	13	DSQ 41^{†}	14	12	22	8	8	DNF 26	6	–	173	132
15	Nic Asher; Fynn Sterritt	Great Britain	30^{†}	2	6	15	10	21	18	19	10	15	RDG 16.6	2	–	164.6	134.6
16	Marcus Hansen; Josh Porebski	New Zealand	1	22	14	10	6	17	25^{†}	21	16	5	8	17	–	162	137
17	Łukasz Przybytek; Paweł Kołodziński	Poland	13	21	16	9	7	12	10	RDG 14.6	22^{†}	20	9	8	–	161.6	139.6
18	James Peters; Samuel Batten	Great Britain	11	6	7	25^{†}	25	10	17	10	14	23	14	7	–	169	144
19	Lauri Lehtinen; Miikka Pennanen	Finland	4	10	13	7	26^{†}	23	20	15	18	7	17	14	–	174	148
20	Luca Dubbini; Roberto Dubbini	Italy	6	32^{†}	4	22	5	5	14	23	23	22	7	20	–	183	151
21	Pavle Kostov; Petar Cupać	Croatia	11	1	13	11	19	24^{†}	16	7	17	19	15	24	–	177	153
22	Giuseppe Angilella; Pietro Zucchetti	Italy	21	7	31^{†}	7	11	22	3	12	21	24	16	13	–	188	157
23	Ruggero Tita; Giacomo Cavalli	Italy	23	24	10	6	12	16	15	1	20	25	DNF 26^{†}	10	–	188	162
24	Bradley Funk; Trevor Burd	United States	19	1	11	5	5	20	22	25	DNC 26^{†}	14	21	21	–	190	164
25	Logan Dunning Beck; Jack Simpson	New Zealand	5	8	5	18	33^{†}	DNF 26	21	24	24	21	18	4	–	207	174
26	William Phillips; Jasper Warren	Australia	24	16	38^{†}	15	2	1	10	5	3	13	–	–	–	127	89
27	Steven Thomas; Sam Phillips	Australia	31	2	33^{†}	27	14	2	5	1	1	8	–	–	–	124	91
28	Frederick Strammer; Zachary Brown	United States	17	30^{†}	8	24	22	3	6	4	9	2	–	–	–	125	95
29	Tomasz Januszewski; Jacek Nowak	Poland	15	18	28^{†}	23	17	5	3	8	2	4	–	–	–	123	95
30	Marco Grael; Gabriel Borges	Brazil	18	13	32^{†}	13	12	10	12	3	6	12	–	–	–	131	99
31	Yukio Makino; Kenji Takahashi	Japan	19	12	12	18	13	24^{†}	16	12	8	5	–	–	–	139	115
32	Fritiof Hedström; Niclas Düring	Sweden	8	30	24	3	UFD 41^{†}	7	13	9	12	19	–	–	–	166	125
33	Victor Bergström; Victor Västernäs	Sweden	13	18	DNF 41^{†}	16	21	4	24	26	5	6	–	–	–	174	133
34	Justus Schmidt; Max Boehme	Germany	28^{†}	6	15	17	22	13	17	16	13	15	–	–	–	162	134
35	Federico Alonso; Arturo Alonso	Spain	22	24	20	6	RDG 18	22	8	11	4	26^{†}	–	–	–	161	135
36	Rory Hunter; Neil Hunter	Great Britain	27	34^{†}	21	10	11	18	22	17	7	10	–	–	–	177	143
37	Diego Botín; Pablo Turrado	Spain	12	27	27	17	DNF 41^{†}	8	14	7	16	17	–	–	–	186	145
38	Yago Lange; Klaus Lange	Argentina	24	21	DNF 41^{†}	12	8	21	2	19	20	20	–	–	–	188	147
39	Artem Basalkin; Nikolay Chernikov	Russia	3	8	DNF 41^{†}	14	DSQ 41	15	20	20	19	9	–	–	–	190	149
40	David Mori; Justin Barnes	Canada	29	20	15	DNC 41^{†}	9	12	21	10	18	16	–	–	–	191	150
41	Francisco Rebelo de Andrade; João Rosa	Portugal	26	9	4	28^{†}	28	6	4	23	25	27	–	–	–	180	152
42	Joel Turner; Lewis Brake	Australia	20	17	23	UFD 41^{†}	16	DNF 29	DNF 29	6	10	3	–	–	–	194	153
43	Pavel Kalinchev; Pavel Karachov	Russia	26	16	DNF 41^{†}	23	19	9	DNF 29	14	11	7	–	–	–	195	154
44	Thomas Barrows III; Joseph Morris	United States	33^{†}	32	10	24	9	16	18	15	22	11	–	–	–	190	157
45	Przemek Filipowicz; Jacek Piasecki	Poland	8	23	RDG 17	21	16	25	23	2	DSQ 29^{†}	22	–	–	–	186	157
46	Mathieu Frei; Yann Rocherieux	France	20	UFD 41^{†}	11	4	DSQ 41	14	1	UFD 29	17	24	–	–	–	202	161
47	Philipp Müller; Kilian Holzapfel	Germany	25	36^{†}	22	19	17	19	11	13	21	18	–	–	–	201	165
48	Carl P. Sylvan; Hannes Westberg	Sweden	28	29^{†}	9	22	27	11	9	25	14	21	–	–	–	195	166
49	Benjamin Bildstein; David Hussl	Austria	DSQ 41^{†}	11	12	26	15	UFD 29	15	21	15	23	–	–	–	208	167
50	Remy Oomens; Bart de Haan	Netherlands	12	29	DNF 41^{†}	20	24	23	19	18	23	1	–	–	–	210	169
51	Yannick Lefèbvre; Matthieu Janssens	Belgium	9	26^{†}	26	20	23	17	7	22	24	25	–	–	–	199	173
52	Graeme Willcox; Andrew Tarboton	South Africa	30	31^{†}	1	27	26	20	25	24	26	14	–	–	–	224	193
53	Stelios Sotiriou; Alfonso Panagiotidis	Greece	23	5	34^{†}	29	RDG 22.8	DNF 29	DNF 29	DNF 29	DNF 29	DNF 29	–	–	–	258.8	224.8
54	Dylan Fletcher-Scott; Alain Sign	Great Britain	UFD 41^{†}	20	DNF 41	33	2	2	1	1	1	1	1	–	–	144	103
55	Dante Bianchi; Thomas Low-Beer	Brazil	29	7	DNF 41^{†}	UFD 41	18	7	2	5	2	10	2	–	–	164	123
56	Kévin Fischer; Marc Mallaret	France	14	37	DSQ 41^{†}	21	20	3	6	3	5	7	UFD 28	–	–	185	144
57	Jacopo Plazzi Marzotto; Umberto Molineris	Italy	39	22	29	14	DSQ 41^{†}	1	5	2	DNF 28	2	13	–	–	196	155
58	Alec Anderson; Christopher Brockbank	British Virgin Islands	32	9	DNF 41^{†}	UFD 41	21	6	7	10	7	15	10	–	–	199	158
59	Víctor Payá; Alvaro Del Arco	Spain	15	13	DNF 41^{†}	30	34	9	3	UFD 28	6	22	6	–	–	207	166
60	Tonis Haavel; Lenart Kivistik	Estonia	35	28	3	DNF 41^{†}	27	20	19	9	9	14	11	–	–	216	175
61	Sébastien Schneiter; Lucien Cujean	Switzerland	34^{†}	14	17	31	RDG 24	17	14	15	DNF 28	12	4	–	–	210	176
62	Carlos Robles; Daniel Canovas Colon	Spain	14	27	DNF 41^{†}	37	15	10	13	11	11	DNF 28	15	–	–	222	181
63	Victor Casas; Bryan Mettraux	Switzerland	32	39	25	32	UFD 41^{†}	11	9	6	DNF 28	3	3	–	–	229	188
64	Konstantin Nosov; Aleksandr Gaidaenko	Russia	10	33	30	34^{†}	23	4	12	DNC 28	13	21	22	–	–	230	196
65	Gustav Petterson; Marcus Anjemark	Sweden	UFD 41^{†}	35	DNF 41	29	29	5	8	4	BFD 28	5	17	–	–	242	201
66	Gonzalo Pollitzer; Federico Villambrosa	Argentina	4	28	DNF 41^{†}	DNC 41	20	8	UFD 28	14	BFD 28	16	16	–	–	244	203
67	Levi Slap; Tom Pelsmaekers	Belgium	21	36	DNF 41^{†}	28	29	12	21	13	15	9	19	–	–	244	203
68	John Ferguson; Arthur Ferguson	Canada	37	37	DNF 41^{†}	5	28	18	17	8	3	23	UFD 28	–	–	245	204
69	Marti Llena Prats; Jordi Llena	Spain	RDG 27.5	35	8	36^{†}	31	13	22	UFD 28	10	11	21	–	–	242.5	206.5
70	Chris Taylor; Chris Brewer	Great Britain	37	40^{†}	39	25	24	15	20	17	8	13	12	–	–	250	210
71	Benjamin Grez; Cristóbal Grez	Chile	31	33	DSQ 41^{†}	9	32	DNF 28	11	7	BFD 28	17	14	–	–	251	210
72	Dane Wilson; William McBride	United States	36	38^{†}	36	35	30	14	16	16	12	20	7	–	–	260	222
73	Mads Emil Lübeck; Nikolaj Hoffmann Buhl	Denmark	22	19	DNF 41^{†}	31	DSQ 41	DNC 28	DNF 28	DNC 28	4	4	20	–	–	266	225
74	Erik Heil; Fabian Graf	Germany	UFD 41^{†}	10	DNF 41	DNS 41	25	DNC 28	4	12	DNF 28	8	DNF 28	–	–	266	225
75	Jack Hawkins; Christopher Thomas	Great Britain	27	26	DNF 41^{†}	DNF 41	18	16	10	UFD 28	BFD 28	DNF 28	5	–	–	268	227
76	Tobias Hemdorff; Mathias Livbjerg	Denmark	35	34	DNF 41^{†}	30	DNF 41	21	15	UFD 28	14	6	9	–	–	274	233
77	Ganapathy Kelapanda; Varun Thakkar	India	9	3	RET 41^{†}	RET 41	DNF 41	DNC 28	DNF 28	DNC 28	DNF 28	18	18	–	–	283	242
78	Andrea Savio; Alessandro Savio	Italy	18	25	DNF 41^{†}	16	RET 41	DNC 28	DNF 28	DNC 28	DNF 28	DNF 28	DNF 28	–	–	309	268
79	Lukas Cejnar; Matyas Cejnar	Czech Republic	36	31	DNF 41^{†}	DNC 41	DNF 41	DNC 28	DNF 28	DNC 28	DNF 28	DNF 28	8	–	–	338	297
80	Denis Shcheeglov; Mikhail Popov	Russia	34	DSQ 41^{†}	DNF 41	DNC 41	DNF 41	19	18	DNC 28	DNF 28	19	UFD 28	–	–	338	297

Scoring system: low-point system; Source:
Legend: – Qualified for medal race(s); BFD – Black flag disqualification; DNC – Did not come to the starting area; DNF – Did not finish; DNS – Did not start; DSQ – Disqualified; RDG – Redress given; RET – Retired; UFD – "U" flag disqualification; † – Discarded race not counted in the overall result;
