= 2016 in sailing =

The following were the scheduled events of sailing for the year 2016 throughout the world.

== Events ==
=== Olympic classes events ===
==== Olympic Games ====
- 7–20 August: 2016 Summer Olympics in Rio de Janeiro, Brazil
  - Men's 470
    - (gold) : Šime Fantela & Igor Marenić (CRO)
    - (silver) : Mathew Belcher & William Ryan (AUS)
    - (bronze) : Panagiotis Mantis & Pavlos Kagialis (GRE)
  - Women's 470
    - (gold) : Hannah Mills & Saskia Clark (GBR)
    - (silver) : Jo Aleh & Polly Powrie (NZL)
    - (bronze) : Camille Lecointre & Hélène Defrance (FRA)
  - Men's 49er
    - (gold) : Peter Burling & Blair Tuke (NZL)
    - (silver) : Nathan Outteridge & Iain Jensen (AUS)
    - (bronze) : Erik Heil & Thomas Plößel (GER)
  - Women's 49er FX
    - (gold) : Martine Grael & Kahena Kunze (BRA)
    - (silver) : Alex Maloney & Molly Meech (NZL)
    - (bronze) : Jena Hansen & Katja Salskov-Iversen (DEN)
  - Men's Finn
    - (gold) : Giles Scott (GBR)
    - (silver) : Vasilij Žbogar (SLO)
    - (bronze) : Caleb Paine (USA)
  - Men's Laser
    - (gold) : Tom Burton (AUS)
    - (silver) : Tonči Stipanović (CRO)
    - (bronze) : Sam Meech (NZL)
  - Women's Laser Radial
    - (gold) : Marit Bouwmeester (NED)
    - (silver) : Annalise Murphy (IRL)
    - (bronze) : Anne-Marie Rindom (DEN)
  - Mixed Nacra 17
    - (gold) : Santiago Lange & Cecilia Carranza (ARG)
    - (silver) : Jason Waterhouse & Lisa Darmanin (AUS)
    - (bronze) : Thomas Zajac & Tanja Frank (AUT)
  - Men's RS:X
    - (gold) : Dorian van Rijsselberghe (NED)
    - (silver) : Nick Dempsey (GBR)
    - (bronze) : Pierre Le Coq (FRA)
  - Women's RS:X
    - (gold) : Charline Picon (FRA)
    - (silver) : Chen Peina (CHN)
    - (bronze) : Stefania Elfutina (RUS)

==== World championships ====
- 9–14 February: 49er & 49er FX World Championships in Clearwater, United States
  - Men's 49er
    - (gold) : Peter Burling & Blair Tuke (NZL)
    - (silver) : Nico Delle Karth & Nikolaus Leopold Resch (AUT)
    - (bronze) : Dylan Fletcher-Scott & Alain Sign (GBR)
  - Women's 49er FX
    - (gold) : Támara Echegoyen & Berta Betanzos (ESP)
    - (silver) : Maiken Foght Schütt & Anne-Julie Schütt (DEN)
    - (bronze) : Victoria Jurczok & Anika Lorenz (GER)
- 20–27 February: RS:X World Championships in Eilat, Israel
  - Men's RS:X
    - (gold) : Piotr Myszka (POL)
    - (silver) : Dorian van Rijsselberghe (NED)
    - (bronze) : Kiran Badloe (NED)
  - Women's RS:X
    - (gold) : Małgorzata Białecka (POL)
    - (silver) : Bryony Shaw (GBR)
    - (bronze) : Lilian de Geus (NED)
- 20–27 February: 470 World Championships in San Isidro, Argentina
  - Men's 470
    - (gold) : Šime Fantela & Igor Marenić (CRO)
    - (silver) : Paul Snow-Hansen & Daniel Willcox (NZL)
    - (bronze) : Mathew Belcher & Will Ryan (AUS)
  - Women's 470
    - (gold) : Camille Lecointre & Hélène Defrance (FRA)
    - (silver) : Jo Aleh & Polly Powrie (NZL)
    - (bronze) : Lara Vadlau & Jolanta Ogar (AUT)
- 12–20 April: Laser Radial World Championships in Nuevo Vallarta, Mexico
  - (gold) : Alison Young (GBR)
  - (silver) : Paige Railey (USA)
  - (bronze) : Anne-Marie Rindom (DEN)
- 5–15 May: Finn Gold Cup in Gaeta, Italy
  - (gold) : Giles Scott (GBR)
  - (silver) : Jonas Høgh-Christensen (DEN)
  - (bronze) : Pieter-Jan Postma (NED)
- 10–18 May: Laser World Championship in Nuevo Vallarta, Mexico
  - (gold) : Nick Thompson (GBR)
  - (silver) : Jean-Baptiste Bernaz (FRA)
  - (bronze) : Rutger van Schaardenburg (NED)

==== Sailing World Cup ====
- 7 December 2015 – 11 December 2016: 2016 ISAF Sailing World Cup
  - 23–30 January: Sailing World Cup Miami in Miami, United States
  - 25–1 May: Sailing World Cup Hyères in Hyères, France
  - 6–12 June: Sailing World Cup Weymouth in Weymouth & Portland, United Kingdom
  - 19–25 September: Sailing World Cup Qingdao in Qingdao, China
  - 4–11 December: Sailing World Cup Final in Melbourne, Australia

==== African championships ====
- 12–17 January: 470 African Championships in Cape Town, South Africa
  - (gold) : Asenathi Jim & Roger Hudson (RSA)
  - (silver) : Sibusiso Sizatu & Alex Burger (RSA)
  - (bronze) : Brevan Thompson & Alexander Ham (RSA)

==== European championships ====
- 26 February – 4 March: Laser European Championships in Las Palmas, Spain
  - Men's Laser
    - (gold) : Jesper Stålheim (SWE)
    - (silver) : Kristian Ruth (NOR)
    - (bronze) : Giovanni Coccoluto (ITA)
  - Women's Laser Radial
    - (gold) : Marit Bouwmeester (NED)
    - (silver) : Josefin Olsson (SWE)
    - (bronze) : Tuula Tenkanen (FIN)
- 4–14 March: Finn European Championship in Barcelona, Spain
  - (gold) : Pieter-Jan Postma (NED)
  - (silver) : Zsombor Berecz (HUN)
  - (bronze) : Milan Vujasinović (CRO)
- 5–12 April: 470 European Championships in Mallorca, Spain
  - Men's 470
    - (gold) : Mathew Belcher & Will Ryan (AUS)
    - (silver) : Sofan Bouvet & Jérémie Mion (FRA)
    - (bronze) : Stuart McNay & David Hughes (USA)
  - Women's 470
    - (gold) : Lara Vadlau & Jolanta Ogar (AUT)
    - (silver) : Afrodite Kyranakou & Anneloes van Veen (NED)
    - (bronze) : Fernanda Oliveira & Ana Barbachan (BRA)
- 11–16 April: 49er & 49er FX European Championships in Barcelona, Spain
- 2–9 July: RS:X European Championships in Helsinki, Finland
  - Men's RS:X
    - (gold) : Thomas Goyard (FRA)
    - (silver) : Kieran Holmes-Martin (GBR)
    - (bronze) : Paweł Tarnowski (POL)
  - Women's RS:X
    - (gold) : Charline Picon (FRA)
    - (silver) : Zofia Noceti-Klepacka (POL)
    - (bronze) : Stefania Elfutina (RUS)
- 16–24 September: Nacra 17 European Championship in Thessaloniki, Greece

==== North American championships ====
- 16–18 January: 470 North American Championships in Coconut Grove, United States
  - (gold) : Stuart McNay & David Hughes (USA)
  - (silver) : Fernanda Oliveira & Ana Barbachan (BRA)
  - (bronze) : Panagiotis Mantis & Pavlos Kagialis (GRE)
- 21–24 July: Laser North American Championships in Cascade Locks, United States
  - Men's Laser
    - (gold) : Christopher Barnard (USA)
    - (silver) : Erik Bowers (USA)
    - (bronze) : Max Gallant (CAN)
  - Open Laser Radial
    - (gold) : Haddon Hughes (USA)
    - (silver) : Corinne Peters (CAN)
    - (bronze) : Leo Boucher (USA)
- 19–13 August: RS:X North American Championships in Kingston, Canada
- 26–28 August: 49er & 49er FX North American Championships in Newport, United States
  - Men's 49er
    - (gold) : Carlos Robles & Trevor Burd (USA)
    - (silver) : Judge Ryan & Hans Henken (USA)
    - (bronze) : Andrew Mollerus & Matthew Mollerus (USA)
  - Women's 49er FX
    - (gold) : Arielle Morgan & Heather Wyatt (CAN)
    - (silver) : Alexandra ten Hove & Mariah Millen (CAN)
    - (bronze) : Sophie Vinnet & Naomi Flanagan (USA)

==== South American championships ====
- 10–13 February: 470 South American Championship in San Isidro, Argentina
- 11–14 July: 49er & 49er FX South American Championships in Rio de Janeiro, Brazil
  - Men's 49er
    - (gold) : Nathan Outteridge & Iain Jensen (AUS)
    - (silver) : Łukasz Przybytek & Paweł Kołodziński (POL)
    - (bronze) : Peter Burling & Blair Tuke (NZL)
  - Women's 49er FX
    - (gold) : Victoria Travascio & María Sol Branz (ARG)
    - (silver) : Alex Maloney & Molly Meech (NZL)
    - (bronze) : Sarah Steyaert & Aude Compan (FRA)
- 27–31 July: RS:X South American Championships in São Paulo, Brazil

=== Other major events ===
==== America's Cup ====
- 25 July 2015 – 20 November 2016: 2015–16 America's Cup World Series
  - 7 & 8 May: New York, United States
  - 11 & 12 June: Chicago, United States
  - 23 & 24 July: Portsmouth, United Kingdom
  - 10 & 11 September: Toulon, France
  - 19 & 20 November: Fukuoka, Japan

==== Extreme Sailing Series ====
- 16 February – 11 December: 2016 Extreme Sailing Series
  - 16–19 February: Act #1 in Muscat, Oman
    - Winners: Oman Air
  - 27 April – 1 May: Act #2 in Qingdao, China
    - Winners: (Switzerland) Alinghi
  - 24–26 June: Act #3 in Cardiff, United Kingdom
    - Winners: Oman Air
  - 14–17 July: Act #4 in Hamburg, Germany
    - Winners: Oman Air
  - 25–28 August 2016: Act #5 in St. Petersburg, Russia
    - Winners: (Switzerland) Alinghi
  - 22–25 October: Act #6 in Madeira Islands, Portugal
    - Winners: (Switzerland) Alinghi
  - 6–9 October: Act #7 in Lisbon, Portugal
    - Winners: (Switzerland) Alinghi
  - 8–11 December: Act #8 in Sydney, Australia
    - Winners: (Switzerland) Alinghi

==== World Match Racing Tour ====
- 8 May 2015 – 30 January 2016: 2015 World Match Racing Tour
  - 26–30 January: Monsoon Cup in Johor, Malaysia
- 2 March – 9 July: 2016 World Match Racing Tour
  - 2–7 March: World Match Racing Tour Fremantle in Fremantle, Australia
  - 5–10 April: Congressional Cup in Long Beach, United States
  - 9–14 May: Danish Open in Copenhagen, Denmark
  - 30 May – 4 June: World Match Racing Tour Newport in Newport, United States
  - 4–9 July: Match Cup Sweden in Marstrand, Sweden

=== Other classes ===
==== World championships ====
- 7–17 April: Star World Championship in Miami, United States
- 3–9 June: Hansa World Championships in Medemblik, Netherlands
- 20–26 June: 470 Junior World Championships in Kiel, Germany
  - Men's 470
    - (gold) : Keiju Okada & Naoya Kimura (JPN)
    - (silver) : David Charles & Alex Charles (ESP)
    - (bronze) : Daichi Takayama & Akira Takayanagi (JPN)
  - Women's 470
    - (gold) : Silvia Mas & Paula Barceló (ESP)
    - (silver) : Marina Lefort & Lara Granier (FRA)
    - (bronze) : Maria Bozi & Rafailina Klonaridou (GRE)
- 14–19 July: 6 Metre World Championship in Brunnen, Switzerland
- 15–23 July: 420 World Championships in Sanremo, Italy
- 22–29 July: OK World Championship in Quiberon, France
- 25–29 July: RS100 World Championship in Travemünde, Germany
- 30 July – 5 August: Dart 18 World Championship in Medemblik, Netherlands
- 30 July – 5 August: RS Tera World Championships in Santoña, Spain
- 22 August – 3 September: International 14 World Championships in Carnac, France
- 9–15 September: Formula Kite World Championships in Weifang, China
- 15–19 November: IKA KiteFoil GoldCup Final / World Championships (Open) in The Pearl, Qatar
- 12–17 December: RS:One World Championships in Dubai, United Arab Emirates
- 14–20 December: ISAF Youth Sailing World Championships in Auckland, New Zealand

==== European championships ====
- 22–26 March: Zoom 8 European Championships in Palamos, Spain
- 30 April – 6 May: Soling European Championship in Traunsee, Austria
- 13–16 May: RS Feva European championship in Lipno, Czech Republic
- 16–22 May: IKA European Championship in Cagliari, Italy
- 22–26 June: Tornado European Championship in Cesenatico, Italy
- 23–26 June: J/70 European Championship in Kiel, Germany
  - (gold) : Claudia Rossi, Matteo Mason, Simone Spangaro, & Michele Paoletti (ITA)
  - (silver) : Stefano Roberti, Enrico Fonda, Ludovic Broquaire, & Filippo Lamantia (MON)
  - (bronze) : Gonzalo Araújo, Guilherme Almeida, Diego Fructuoso, & Nacho Giamonna (ESP)
- 25–29 June: B14 European Championships in Torbole, Italy
- 25 June – 1 July: One Metre European Championship in Vitoria-Gasteiz, Spain
- 29 June – 4 July: 29er European Championships in Tønsberg, Norway
- 2–9 July: RS:X Youth European Championship in Helsinki, Finland
- 5–13 July: F18 European Championship in Brest, France
- 7–10 July: Melges 32 European Championship in Riva del Garda, Italy
- 15–23 July: Optimist European Championship in Crotone, Italy
- 21–24 July: Sunfish European Championship in Marina di Grosseto, Italy
- 29 July – 6 August: 420 European Junior Championships & 470 European Junior Championships in Lake Balaton, Hungary
- 30 July – 6 August: Fireball European Championship in Brenzone, Italy
- 10–14 August: European Match Racing Championship in Christiansminde, Denmark
- 2–9 September: Melges 24 European Championships in Hyères, France
- 20–25 September: Snipe European Championship in Santiago de la Ribera, Spain

==== North American championships ====
- 14–18 August: 29er North American Championship in Kingston, Canada

==== South American championships ====
- 21–24 April: Soling North American Championship in Porto Alegre, Brazil

=== Other events ===
- 25 March – 2 April: Trofeo Princesa Sofía in Palma, Spain
- 9–14 May: Garda Trentino Olympic Week in Malcesine, Italy
- 24–28 May: Delta Lloyd Regatta in Medemblik, Netherlands
- 18–26 June: Kiel Week in Kiel, Germany
  - Men's 470 winners: Ferdinand Gerz & Oliver Szymanski (GER)
  - Women's 470 winners: Alisa Kirilyuk & Liudmila Dmitrieva (RUS)
  - Men's 49er winners: Peter Burling & Blair Tuke (NZL)
  - Women's 49er FX winners: Tina Lutz & Susann Beucke (GER)
  - Men's Finn winner: Phillip Kasüske (GER)
  - Men's Laser winner: Philipp Buhl (GER)
  - Women's Laser Radial winner: Tiril Bue (NOR)
  - Mixed Nacra 17 winners: Paul Kohlhoff & Carolina Werner (GER)
  - 12 Metre winners: Vim – Andrea Proto, Peter Müller, Ole Skov, Natale Proto, Mads Groth, Troels Bækholm, Nikolaj Nielsen, Caspar Kiellerop Larsen, Stefan Zeyse, Jens Holmberg, Jens Möller, Leerke Nergaavel, Tommy Olsson, Lef Motte, Mads Walther, & Stig Westergaard (USA)
  - 2.4 Metre winner: Heiko Kröger (GER)
  - 29er winners: Gwendal Lamay & Luke Willim (GER)
  - 420 winners: Wiley Rogers & Jack Parkin (USA)
  - 5.5 Metre winners: Ger Schmitz, Uli Ellerbeck, & Gerhard Kruse (GER)
  - 505 winners: Andy Smith & Tim Needham (GBR)
  - Albin Ballad winners: Michael Langhans, Jan Lok, Birgit Ehlers, & Thomas Wiese (GER)
  - Albin Express winners: Jan Brink, Jan Günther, Jörg Rüterhenke, & Jens Lücke (GER)
  - Contender winner: Søren Dulong Andreasen (DEN)
  - Europe winner: Lars Johan Brodtorb (NOR)
  - Flying Dutchman winners: Kilian König & Johannes Brack (GER)
  - Formula 18 winners: Helge Sach & Christian Sach (GER)
  - Hobie 16 winners: Ingo Delius & Kai Tittjung (GER)
  - J/24 winners: Tobias Feuerherdt, Jan-Marc Ulrich, Lukas Feuerherdt, Tobias Peters, & Justus Fritz Kellner (GER)
  - J/80 winners: Martin Menzner, Mika Rolfs, Frank Lichte, & Nils Beltermann (GER)
  - Laser 4.7 winner: Maksim Dziahel (BLR)
  - Laser Radial winner: Aleksi Tapper (FIN)
  - Melges 24 winners: Andrea Pozzi, Stefan Ciampalini, Giuluo Desiderato, Carlo Zermini, & Nicolas Dal Ferro (ITA)
  - Musto Skiff winner: Frithjof Schwerdt (GER)
  - Nordic Folkboat winners: Ulf Kipcke, Dieter Kipcke, & Gero Martens (GER)
  - OK winner: Thomas Hansson-Mild (SWE)
  - Sonar winners: Lasse Klötzing, Siegmund Mainka, & Jens Kroker (GER)
- 26 December – 30 December: 2016 Sydney to Hobart Yacht Race from Sydney, Australia to Hobart, Australia
  - Line honours: Perpetual Loyal – Anthony Bell (AUS), 1d 13h 31m 20s
  - Handicap winners: Giacomo – Jim Delegat (NZL), 2d 16h 13m 37s

== Deaths ==
- 7 December – Paul Elvstrøm, 88, Danish Olympic sailor
