= Sailing at the 2016 Summer Olympics – 49er =

Men's 49er at the Games of the XXXI Olympiad
- Line drawing of the 49er
- Venue: Marina da Glória
- Dates: 12–18 August
- Competitors: 40 from 20 nations
- Winning total: 35 points

Medalists
1st place, gold medalist(s)		Peter Burling; Blair Tuke	New Zealand
2nd place, silver medalist(s)		Nathan Outteridge; Iain Jensen	Australia
3rd place, bronze medalist(s)		Erik Heil; Thomas Plößel	Germany

The Men's 49er was a sailing event on the Sailing at the 2016 Summer Olympics program in Rio de Janeiro and took place between 12–18 August at Marina da Glória. 13 races (the last one a medal race) were held.

The medals were presented by Barbara Kendall, IOC member, New Zealand and Adrienne Greenwood, Vice President of World Sailing.

== Schedule ==
Fri 12 Aug	Sat 13 Aug	Sun 14 Aug	Mon 15 Aug	Tue 16 Aug	Wed 17 Aug	Thu 18 Aug
Race 1 Race 2 Race 3	Race 4 Race 5 Race 6	Rest day	Race 7 Race 8 Race 9	Race 10; Race 11; Race 12	Rest day	Medal race

== Results ==
Results of individual races
Pos	Crew	Country	I	II	III	IV	V	VI	VII	VIII	IX	X	XI	XII	MR	Tot	Pts
Gold medal	Peter Burling; Blair Tuke	New Zealand	1	1	5	2	7^{†}	6	2	3	1	3	5	4	2	42.0	35.0
Silver medal	Nathan Outteridge; Iain Jensen	Australia	13^{†}	8	2	5	10	12	4	5	8	2	7	7	8	91.0	78.0
Bronze medal	Erik Heil; Thomas Plößel	Germany	6	3	1	3	4	13	14	4	5	10	4	18^{†}	16	101.0	83.0
4	Jonas Warrer; Christian Peter Lübeck	Denmark	8	9	DSQ 21^{†}	15	1	5	6	13	14	18	1	2	6	119.0	98.0
5	Julien d'Ortoli; Noé Delpech	France	20^{†}	12	16	12	2	9	1	1	3	17	9	14	4	120.0	100.0
6	Dylan Fletcher; Alain Sign	Great Britain	15	10	7	20^{†}	14	4	5	6	9	1	6	3	20	120.0	100.0
7	Yago Lange; Klaus Lange	Argentina	11	7	6	16	12	16	DSQ 21^{†}	2	2	11	3	11	14	132.0	111.0
8	Łukasz Przybytek; Paweł Kołodziński	Poland	2	13	9	9	5	RDG 9.3	18^{†}	11	7	16	18	9	10	136.3	118.3
9	Diego Botín; Iago López	Spain	16	5	3	13	6	10	13	15	18^{†}	12	2	13	12	132.0	120.0
10	Ryan Seaton; Matt McGovern	Ireland	14	2	4	1	13	17	12	7	13	19	20^{†}	1	18	141.0	121.0
11	Marco Grael; Gabriel Borges	Brazil	10	11	8	7	19^{†}	7	10	17	10	8	15	6		128.0	109.0
12	Nico Delle Karth; Nikolaus Resch	Austria	17	6	10	18	3	14	3	14	DNF 21^{†}	4	11	16		137.0	116.0
13	Sébastien Schneiter; Lucien Cujean	Switzerland	5	16	12	4	17^{†}	15	15	10	16	5	17	5		137.0	120.0
14	Ruggero Tita; Pietro Zucchetti	Italy	7	20^{†}	19	11	15	8	9	9	6	7	10	19		140.0	120.0
15	Pavle Kostov; Petar Cupać	Croatia	9	17	11	10	11	1	17	18^{†}	15	13	8	10		140.0	122.0
16	Jorge Lima; José Costa	Portugal	4	4	18	6	16	DSQ 21^{†}	11	19	4	9	19	12		143.0	122.0
17	Yannick Lefèbvre; Tom Pelsmaekers	Belgium	19	14	13	17	9	3	8	8	12	20^{†}	14	8		145.0	125.0
18	Yukio Makino; Kenji Takahashi	Japan	3	15	17	8	8	2	19	12	17	15	16	20^{†}		152.0	132.0
19	Thomas Barrows III; Joseph Morris	United States	18	19	14	14	DSQ 21^{†}	11	16	16	11	6	13	17		176.0	155.0
20	Benjamin Grez; Cristóbal Grez	Chile	12	18	15	19	18	DSQ 21^{†}	7	20	DNF 21	14	12	15		192.0	171.0

Scoring system: low-point system;
Legend: – Qualified for medal race(s); DNF – Did not finish; DSQ – Disqualified; RDG – Redress given; † – Discarded race not counted in the overall result;
