= Sailing at the 2020 Summer Olympics – 49er =

Sailing event

Men's 49er at the Games of the XXXII Olympiad
- Line drawing of the 49er
- Dates: 27 July – 2 August

Medalists
1st place, gold medalist(s)		Dylan Fletcher; Stuart Bithell	Great Britain
2nd place, silver medalist(s)		Peter Burling; Blair Tuke	New Zealand
3rd place, bronze medalist(s)		Erik Heil; Thomas Plößel	Germany

The men's 49er was a sailing event at the 2020 Summer Olympics and took place between 27 July – 2 August.

The medals were presented by IOC Member for Spain, Mr Juan Antonio Samaranch Jnr. (son of former Olympic President Juan Antonio Samaranch) and World Sailing President Li Quanhai.

== Schedule ==
Tue 27 Jul	Wed 28 Jul	Thu 29 Jul	Fri 30 Jul	Sat 31 Jul	Sun 1 Aug	Mon 2 Aug
Race 1	Race 2 Race 3 Race 4	Race 5 Race 6	Race 7 Race 8 Race 9	Race 10; Race 11; Race 12	Rest day	Medal race

== Results ==
Results of individual races
Pos	Crew	Country	I	II	III	IV	V	VI	VII	VIII	IX	X	XI	XII	MR	Tot	Pts
Gold medal	Dylan Fletcher; Stuart Bithell	Great Britain	2	8	4	1	12	2	2	16^{†}	3	9	6	7	1	74	58
Silver medal	Peter Burling; Blair Tuke	New Zealand	12^{†}	3	7	2	10	1	3	6	2	5	2	11	3	70	58
Bronze medal	Erik Heil; Thomas Plößel	Germany	3	13	5	14^{†}	2	3	1	7	11	2	14	5	2	84	70
4	Diego Botín; Iago López	Spain	5	1	2	5	4	10	15^{†}	2	5	4	12	6	7	85	70
5	Jonas Warrer; Jakob Precht Jensen	Denmark	6	5	10	3	1	4	6	4	14	15^{†}	5	8	8	87	82
6	Bart Lambriex; Pim van Vugt	Netherlands	14^{†}	2	3	7	6	7	13	14	7	6	7	3	6	101	87
7	Jorge Lima; José Costa	Portugal	11	6	9	6	5	20^{†} UFD	5	10	1	11	4	4	OCS	114	94
8	Šime Fantela; Mihovil Fantela	Croatia	4	14	8	13; STP	13	6	14	3	20^{†} DSQ	1	10	2	9	126	106
9	Łukasz Przybytek; Paweł Kołodziński	Poland	9	7	15	18^{†}	7	8	7	1	13	17	1	15	4	126	108
10	Benjamin Bildstein; David Hussl	Austria	10	17^{†}	6	4	9	9	10	5	16	7	15	13	5	131	114
11	Leo Takahashi; Ibuki Koizumi	Japan	17^{†}	11	13	11	15	11	4	12	4	8	3	16		125	108
12	Will Phillips; Sam Phillips	Australia	7	4	1	8	11	15	16	20^{†} UFD	18	14	8	9		131	111
13	Robert Dickson; Sean Waddilove	Ireland	1	12	11	13	20^{†} DSQ	20; DSQ	8	18	8	3	17	1		132	112
14	Sébastien Schneiter; Lucien Cujean	Switzerland	16	10	14	10	3	20^{†} UFD	9	9	9	18	13	12		143	123
15	Lucas Rual; Émile Amoros	France	15	9	16^{†}	15	8	13	11	15	10	12	16	10		150	134
16	Marco Grael; Gabriel Borges	Brazil	8	16	12	9	20^{†} DSQ	20; DSQ	20; UFD	8	6	19	11	18		167	147
17	Ganapathy Kalapanda; Varun Thakkar	India	18	18	17	19^{†}	14	5	17	11	15	16	9	14		173	154
18	Benjamin Talbot; Alex Burger	South Africa	13	15	18	17	17	14	12	13	17	10	19^{†}	17		182	163
19	William Jones; Evan DePaul	Canada	19	19	20^{†} UFD	16	16	12	18	17	12	15	18	19		201	181

Scoring system: low-point system;
Legend: – Qualified for medal race(s); DNF – Did not finish; DSQ – Disqualified; STP – Standard penalty imposed; UFD – "U" flag disqualification; † – Discarded race not counted in the overall result;
