= 49er & 49er FX South American Championships =

49er & 49er FX South American Championships are annual South American Championship sailing regattas in the 49er and the 49er FX classes organised by the International 49er Class Association.

== Editions ==
Year	City	Country	Dates	Events	Athletes	Nations	Note
2013	Florianópolis	Brazil	18–23 November	2			
2014	Rio de Janeiro	Brazil	5–8 November	2			
2015	Buenos Aires	Argentina	5–8 November	2			
2016	Rio de Janeiro	Brazil	11–14 July	2			

== Medalists ==
=== 49er ===
Year	Gold	Silver	Bronze
2016 Rio de Janeiro	Australia; Nathan Outteridge; Iain Jensen	Poland; Łukasz Przybytek; Paweł Kołodziński	New Zealand; Peter Burling; Blair Tuke

=== 49er FX ===
Year	Gold	Silver	Bronze
2016 Rio de Janeiro	Argentina; Victoria Travascio; María Sol Branz	New Zealand; Alexandra Maloney; Molly Meech	France; Sarah Steyaert; Aude Compan
