= Lists of sailors at the Summer Olympics =

Below are listed lists of sailors at the Summer Olympics.

- List of sailors at the Summer Olympics (alphabetically)
- List of 49er class sailors at the Summer Olympics
- List of Star class sailors at the Summer Olympics
