= Ivan Bulaja =

Croatian sailor (born 1977)

Ivan Bulaja (25 October 1977, Split, Croatia) is a Croatian sailor and sailing trainer. He competed at the Sydney 2000 Olympics in sailing. He coached Croatian and Austrian sailing teams in the six next consecutive Olympic Games (2004, 2008, 2012, 2016, 2020 and 2024).

Together with Pavle Kostov and Petar Cupać, he is a recipient of the International Fair Play Committee's Pierre de Coubertin World Trophy. In the 2008 Summer Olympics they lent their boat to Danes Jonas Warrer and Martin Kirketerp whose mast had broken shortly before the start of their race. Warrer and Kirketerp went on to win a gold medal.
