= Splash World Championship =

Youth Class Sailing World Championship

The Splash World Championships is an annual international sailing regatta for Splash (dinghy) they are organized by the host club on behalf of the International Class Association and recognized by World Sailing, the sports IOC recognized governing body.

== Events ==
Event			Host			Participation					Ref.
Ed.	Dates	Year	Host club	Location	Country	No.			Nat.	Cont	Ref.
1	18-23 Jul	2000		Stavoren	Netherlands						
2	21-27 Jul	2001		Carnac	France	180			9	3	
3	20-26 Jul	2002	Weymouth and Portland Sailing Academy	Weymouth	United Kingdom	154			9	3	
4	19-27 Jul	2003	Marina Stavoren / Royal Yacht Club Sneek	Stavoren	Netherlands						
5	10-17 Jul	2004	Vlaamse Vereniging voor Waterport	Nieuwpoort	Belgium	180			9	3	
6	23-30 Jul	2005	MOKSiR Puckul. Lipowa	Puck	Poland	104			9	2	
7	12-19 Aug	2006	Fraglia Vela Riva	Riva del Garda	Italy	184	122	62	11	4	
8	21-28 Jul	2007	J. K. Mornar	Split	Croatia	118			8	3	
9	19-25 Jul	2008	Clube Náutico de Tavira	Tavira	Portugal						
10	8-14 Aug	2009	Pwllheli Sailing Club	Pwllheli, Wales	United Kingdom	112	72	40	8	3	
11	2-8 Jan	2010	Takapuna Boating Club	Takapuna, Auckland	New Zealand	73	55	18	12	4	
12	13-20 Aug	2011		Cerna v Posumavi	Czech Republic						
13	21-27 Jul	2012		Nieuwpoort	Netherlands	67	43	24	5	1	
14	20-26 Jul	2013		Stellendam	Netherlands	109			5	2	
15	19-25 Jul	2014		Puck	Poland	71			4	1	
16	18-25 Jul	2015	Forca 3	Sant Feliu de Guíxols	Spain	115	63	52	5	2	
17	22-30 Jul	2016	Travemünder Woche	Travemünde, Lübeck	Germany	88			3	1	
18	-	2017		Lelystad	Netherlands	118			3	2	
19	Jul	2018	Vela Club Campione del Garda	Lake Garda	Italy	107					
20	19-27 Jul	2019	Roompot Marina & Beach Resort	Kamperland	Netherlands	80	55	25	3	1	

== Medalists ==
Year	Gold	Silver	Bronze	1st
2000	Conrad Gair (NZL)	Pieter-Jan Postma (NED)	Roelof Bouwmeester (NED)	UNKNOWN
2001	Erwin Veldman (NED)	Roelof Bouwmeester (NED)	Christiaan Goosen (NED)	8th / Jessica Crul (NED)
2002	Shandy Buckley (NZL)	Filip Pietrzak (POL)	Morgan Gutenkunst (USA)	5th / Marit Bouwmeester (NED)
2003	Sandra van Meyden (NED)	Arnold van Ham (NED)	Timo Hagoort (NED)	
2004	Jorne Knegt (NED)	Yannick Lefèbvre (BEL)	Scott Morrison (NZL)	6th / Laura Mars (BEL)
2005	Hielke Dijkstra (NED)	Mark Bonsink (NED)	Andy Maloney (NZL)	5th / Laura Mars (BEL)
2006	Blair Tuke (NZL)	Jochem-Bart Haakman (NED)	Andy Maloney (NZL)	27th / Kelly Heineke (NED)
2007	Willemart Mathieu (BEL)	Aleksander Arian (POL)	Gilles Cleeren (BEL)	15th / Keziah Deverell (NZL)
2008	Ben Lutze (NZL)	Gilles Cleeren (BEL)	George Iane (NZL)	11th / (Netherlands Antilles) Philipine Van Aanholt (AHO)
2009	Declan Burn (NZL)	Hansebas Meijer (NED)	Bleddyn Mon (GBR)	12th / Nienke Reina Jorna (NED)
2010	Chris Steele (NZL)	Declan Burn (NZL)	Ben Lutze (NZL)	20th / Laura Hemingway (NZL)
2011	Taylor Burn (NZL)			
2012	Jelmer Zittema (NED)	Jelle De Boer (NED)	Guyonne Schuch (NED)	3rd / Guyonne Schuch (NED)
2013	Guyonne Schuch (NED)	Steyn van Driessel (NED)	Daan Drontmann (NED)	1st / Guyonne Schuch (NED)
2014	Guyonne Schuch (NED)	Jasper Schuddeboom (NED)	Pieter Van Leijen (NED)	1st / Guyonne Schuch (NED)
2015	Guyonne Schuch (NED)	Bart de Klaver (NED)	Lucas Peeters (NED)	1st / Guyonne Schuch (NED)
2016	Sam Peeks (NED)	Barte Van Der Zijden (NED)	Michal Kostyr (CZE)	4th / Linn Van Aanholt (NED)
2017	Aaron van Dok (NED)	Willem Mulders (NED)	Paulien Thalen (NED)	3rd / Paulien Thalen (NED)
2018	Mark Imminga (NED)			
2019	Finn Snijders (NED)	Carlo Gevers (NED)	Jules Van Raaij (NED)	5th / Hanna Cromwijk (NED)
