= Li Fei =

Li Fei may refer to:

- Consort Li (disambiguation), various consorts of Chinese rulers
- Li Fei (rower) (born 1973), Chinese Olympic rower
- Li Fei (sailor) (born 1983), Chinese sports sailor
- Li Fei (footballer) (born 1983), Chinese football player
- Li Fei (wushu) (born 1975), Chinese wushu athlete and actor in Macau
- Ping Hsin-tao, who used the pen name Fei Li
