= Sailing at the 2023 Pan American Games – 49er =

49er at the 2023 Pan American Games
- Venue: Cofradia Nautica del Pacifico
- Dates: October 28 - November 3
- Competitors: 16 from 8 nations

Medalists
Gold medal	Ian Barrow; Hans Henken	United States
Silver medal	Hernán Umpierre; Fernando Diz	Uruguay
Bronze medal	William Jones; Justin Barnes	Canada

The 49er competition of the sailing events at the 2023 Pan American Games in Santiago was held from October 28 to Novembero 3 at the Cofradia Nautica del Pacifico.

Points were assigned based on the finishing position in each race (1 for first, 2 for second, etc.). The points were totaled from the top 11 results of the first 12 races, with lower totals being better. If a team was disqualified or did not complete the race, 9 points were assigned for that race (as there were 8 teams in this competition). The top 5 teams at that point competed in the final race, with placings counting double for final score. The team with the lowest total score won.

Ian Barrow and Hans Henken from the United States won the event. Hernán Umpierre and Fernando Diz from Uruguay were the second, and William Jones and Justin Barnes from Canada won the bronze medal.

== Schedule ==
All times are (UTC-3).

Date	Time	Round
October 28, 2023	13:00	Races 1, 2 and 3
October 30, 2023	14:30	Races 4, 5 and 6
November 1, 2023	13:00	Races 7, 8 and 9
November 2, 2023	13:00	Races 10, 11 and 12
November 3, 2023	13:04	Medal race

== Results ==
The results were as below.
Race M is the medal race.

Rank	Athlete	Nation	Race													Total Points	Net Points
Rank	Athlete	Nation	1	2	3	4	5	6	7	8	9	10	11	12	M	Total Points	Net Points
1st place, gold medalist(s)	Ian Barrow; Hans Henken	United States	4	1	3	2	1	1	3	1	(7)	2	3	3	2	33	26
2nd place, silver medalist(s)	Hernán Umpierre; Fernando Diz	Uruguay	2 STP	4	1	1	5	(8)	4	6	4	1	1	1	4	42	34
3rd place, bronze medalist(s)	William Jones; Justin Barnes	Canada	6	2	2	4	3	2	6	(7)	2	4	2	5	6	51	44
4	Ander Belausteguigoitia; Danel Belausteguigoitia	Mexico	3	5	4	6	2	5	2	3	(8)	3	7	2	8	58	50
5	Marco Grael; Gabriel Simões	Brazil	2	7	5	3	(9); OCS	4	1	2	1	6	4	6	11; STP	61	52
6	Benjamín Ahrens; Exequiel Ahrens	Chile	5	6	6	(7)	6	6	5	4	3	7	5	4	—	64	57
7	Massimo Contessi; Luca Contessi	Argentina	7	3	7	5	4	3	(9); OCS	8	5	5	6	7	—	69	60
8	Taylor Hasson; Steven Hardee	Virgin Islands	8	8	8	8	(9); OCS	7	9 DNF	5	6	8	8	9 STP	—	93	84
