= Christian Peter Lübeck =

Danish sailor

Personal information
- Full name: Christian Peter Stephensen Lübeck
- Nationality: Danish
- Born: 23 April 1991 (age 33); Lyngby, Rebild, Denmark
- Height: 186 cm (6 ft 1 in)
- Weight: 81 kg (179 lb)

Sailing career
- Class(es): Nacra 17, 49er, 29er
- Club: Royal Danish Yacht Club

Christian Peter Lübeck (born 23 April 1991) is a Danish sailor. He and Jonas Warrer placed fourth in the 49er event at the 2016 Summer Olympics.
