= 2016 World Match Racing Tour =

Event title
- Edition: 17th
- Dates: 2 March 2016 – 9 July 2016

Results
- Winner: (New Zealand) Phil Robertson

The 2016 World Match Racing Tour was a series of match racing sailing regattas staged during 2016 season.

Phil Robertson won the tour by winning the last event in Marstrand, Sweden.

== Regattas ==
Dates	Regatta	City	Country
2–7 March	World Match Racing Tour Fremantle	Fremantle	Australia
5–10 April	Congressional Cup	Long Beach	United States
9–14 May	Danish Open	Copenhagen	Denmark
30 May – 4 June	World Match Racing Tour Newport	Newport	United States
4–9 July	Match Cup Sweden	Marstrand	Sweden
