= Philippe Gasparini =

French yacht racer

Philippe Gasparini (born 23 January 1969) is a French yacht racer who competed in the 2000 Summer Olympics.
