= Krzysztof Kierkowski =

Polish sailor

Personal information
- Nationality: Polish
- Born: 10 October 1980 (age 46) Gdynia, Poland

Sport
- Sport: Sailing

Krzysztof Kierkowski (born 10 October 1980) is a Polish sailor. He competed at the 2004 Summer Olympics and the 2008 Summer Olympics.
