= John Harrysson =

Swedish sailor

Personal information
- Nationality: Sweden
- Born: 7 October 1967 (age 58) Lund, Sweden

Sailing career
- Sport: Sailing
- Club: Royal Gothenburg Yacht Club
- Class(es): 49er, Laser

John Erik Harrysson (born 7 October 1967) is a Swedish Olympic sailor. He finished 6th in the Laser event at the 1996 Summer Olympics and 17th in the 49er event at the 2000 Summer Olympics together with Patrik Sandström.
