= Chris Rast =

Swiss sailor

Personal information
- Nationality: Swiss
- Born: 21 May 1972 (age 54) Columbus, Georgia, United States

Sport
- Sport: Sailing

Chris Rast (born 21 May 1972) is a Swiss-American sailor. He represented Switzerland at the 1996 Summer Olympics and the 2004 Summer Olympics, and the United States at the 2008 Summer Olympics.
