= Marcin Czajkowski =

Polish sailor

Personal information
- Nationality: Polish
- Born: 9 January 1982 (age 44) Gdynia, Poland

Sport
- Sport: Sailing

Marcin Czajkowski (born 9 January 1982) is a Polish sailor. He competed at the 2004 Summer Olympics and the 2008 Summer Olympics.
