= Stuart Bithell =

British sailor (born 1986)

Stuart Bithell MBE
Personal information
- Born: 28 August 1986 (age 39) Rochdale, Greater Manchester, England

Sailing career
- Sport: Sailing
Medal record
Men's sailing
Representing Great Britain
Olympic Games
Gold medal – first place	2020 Tokyo	49er
Silver medal – second place	2012 London	470
World Championships
Gold medal – first place	2017 Matosinhos	49er
Silver medal – second place	2009 Rungsted	470
Silver medal – second place	2011 Perth	470

Stuart Bithell (born 28 August 1986 in Rochdale) is a British sailor and Olympic champion. He competed with Luke Patience in the 470 class at the 2012 Summer Olympics where he won a silver medal and in the 2020 Summer Olympics where he won a gold medal in the Men's 49er class with Dylan Fletcher.

In 2013, it was announced that Bithell and Patience would part ways, their aim for 470 gold no longer viable. While Patience continued in the 470, Bithell moved on to partner with John Pink in the 49er class. They failed to qualify for Rio 2016, losing out to Dylan Fletcher and Alain Sign. After Rio, Pink and Sign both left the class. This resulted in Bithell and Fletcher teaming up. The decision was made in Portland, while the two competed against each other in the Moth class. They worked tirelessly together to reach Tokyo 2020.

Alongside Fletcher, Bithell competed in 2019's inaugural season of the SailGP, onboard Great Britain SailGP Team. He was flight controller on board. The team finished 4th overall.

Bithell became Olympic champion representing Great Britain at the 2020 Summer Olympics in the Men's 49er class with Dylan Fletcher.

Bithell was appointed Member of the Order of the British Empire (MBE) in the 2022 New Year Honours for services to sailing.
