= Jakob Precht Jensen =

Danish sailor

Personal information
- Nationality: Danish
- Born: 6 November 1998 (age 26)

Sport
- Sport: Sailing

Jakob Precht Jensen (born 6 November 1998) is a Danish sailor. He competed in the 49er event at the 2020 Summer Olympics.
