= Patrik Sandström =

Swedish sailor

Stig Patrik Sandström (born 26 February 1967) is a Swedish Olympic sailor. He finished 17th in the 49er event at the 2000 Summer Olympics together with John Harrysson.
