= Rodrigo Duarte =

Brazilian sailor

Personal information
- Full name: Rodrigo Linck Duarte
- Nationality: Brazil
- Born: 1 May 1980 (age 46) Porto Alegre, Brazil
- Height: 1.77 m (5 ft 9 1/2 in)
- Weight: 70 kg (154 lb)

Sailing career
- Sport: Sailing
- Club: Jangadeiros
- Class: Skiff

Rodrigo Linck Duarte (born 1 May 1980) is a Brazilian sailor, who specialized in the skiff (49er) class. Together with his partner André Fonseca, he was named one of the country's top sailors in the skiff boat for two Summer Olympic editions (2004 and 2008), finishing in sixth and seventh place, respectively. A Porto Alegre native, Duarte trained most of his competitive sporting career at Jangadeiros Sailing Club (Portuguese: Clube dos Jangadeiros).

Duarte made his Olympic debut in Athens 2004, sailing with his partner Fonseca in the 49er class. There, the Brazilian pair surprised the 19-crew fleet with a sensational sixth overall position at the end of the sixteen-leg series, posting a net grade of 104.

At the 2008 Summer Olympics in Beijing, Duarte competed for the second time with Fonseca in the 49er class. The Brazilian pair finished eleventh in the golden fleet to secure one of the five remaining spots vying for qualification at the 49er Worlds eight months earlier in Sydney, Australia. Duarte and Fonseca entered the medal race with a terrific tenth-leg triumph and a random wave of top-five marks recorded throughout the race series. Under gusty conditions and heavy rainfall, however, the Brazilians struggled to chase the rest of the fleet on the final run and never looked back, fading steadily to seventh overall with 99 net points.

In 1999 he was runner-up at the Snipe World Championship.
