= Stéphane Christidis =

French sailor (born 1981)

Stéphane Christidis (born 4 June 1981 in Nice) is a French sailor. In 2004, he competed in the men's 49er at the Olympic Games with teammate Marc Audineau, finishing in 11th place. Christidis then competed at the 2012 Summer Olympics in the 49er class with teammate Emmanuel Dyen, finishing in 6th place.
