= Lucien Cujean =

Swiss sailor

Lucien Cujean (born 16 August 1989 in Versoix) is a Swiss sailor. He and Sébastien Schneiter placed 13th in the 49er event at the 2016 Summer Olympics, and 14th in the 49er event at the 2020 Summer Olympics.
