= Marc Audineau =

French yacht racer

Marc Audineau (born 2 June 1971) is a French yacht racer who competed in the 2004 Summer Olympics. He competed in the men's 49er with teammate Stéphane Christidis, finishing in 11th place.
