= William Jones (Canadian sailor) =

Canadian sailor

Personal information
- Full name: William Richard Jones
- Nickname: Will
- Born: March 5, 1995 (age 31) Hamilton, Ontario, Canada
- Height: 183 cm (6 ft 0 in)
- Weight: 80 kg (176 lb)

Sport
- Country: Canada
- Sport: Sailing
- Event: 49er
- Partners: Evan DePaul, Justin Barnes
Medal record
Pan American Games
Bronze medal – third place	2023 Santiago	49er
49er Junior World Championships
Gold medal – first place	2017 Kingston	49er

William Richard Jones (born March 5, 1995) is a Canadian sailor in the 49er class with partner Evan DePaul.

== Career ==
In 2017, Jones and partner Evan DePaul won gold at the World Junior Sailing Championships in the 49er class.

In March 2021, Jones was named to Canada's 2020 Olympic team with his partner Evan DePaul, by being ranked as the top Canadian boat at the 2020 World Championships.
