= Aude Compan =

French sailor

Aude Compan (born 3 March 1993) is a French sailor. She and Sarah Steyaert placed 6th in the 49er FX event at the 2016 Summer Olympics.
