= Yago Lange =

Argentine sailor (born 1988)

Personal information
- Nationality: Argentine
- Born: 22 March 1988 (age 38)

Sport
- Country: Argentina
- Sport: Sailing
Medal record
Men's sailing
Representing Argentina
Pan American Games
Silver medal – second place	2019 Lima	49er

Yago Lange (born March 22, 1988) is an Argentine sailor. He and his brother Klaus Lange placed seventh in the 49er race at the 2016 Summer Olympics. The brothers are the sons of seven-time Olympic sailor Santiago Lange.
