= Petar Cupać =

Croatian sailor

Petar Cupać (born 1 February 1980) is a Croatian sailor. He competed at the 2008 and 2012 Summer Olympics in the 49er class.

Together with his teammates Pavle Kostov and Ivan Bulaja, he is a recipient of the International Fair Play Committee's Pierre de Coubertin World Trophy. In the 2008 Summer Olympics they lent their boat to Danes Jonas Warrer and Martin Kirketerp whose mast had broken shortly before the start of their race. Warrer and Kirketerp went on to win a gold medal.
