= Noé Delpech =

French sailor

Personal information
- Born: 22 February 1986 (age 40) Montpellier, France
- Height: 1.81 m (5 ft 11 in)
- Weight: 82 kg (181 lb)

Sailing career
- Sport: Sailing
- Club: Yachting Club Pointe Rouge, Marseille
- Coached by: Benjamin Bonneau (national)
- Class: 49er FX
Medal record
Representing France
European Championships
Bronze medal – third place	2013 Aarhus	49er FX

Noé Delpech (born 22 February 1986) is a French sailor in the 49er FX class. Together with Julien d'Ortoli he won a bronze medal at the 2013 European Championships and placed fifth at the 2016 Olympics.

Delpech was born in Montpellier and grew up in Réunion, where he took up sailing in 1993; in 2003 he moved to Antibes. Since 2007 he races with d'Ortoli. The pair has a nickname Juno from the combination of the first two letters of their given names.
