= Alex Burger (sailor) =

South African sailor (born 1996)

Personal information
- Nationality: South African
- Born: 6 April 1996 (age 30)

Sport
- Sport: Sailing

Alex Burger (born 6 April 1996) is a South African sailor. He competed in the 49er event at the 2020 Summer Olympics, finishing 18th overall.

He won the 2017 29er World Championships with Benji Daniel as his helm.
