= Julien d'Ortoli =

French sailor

Personal information
- Born: 7 October 1983 (age 43) Marseille, France
- Height: 1.80 m (5 ft 11 in)
- Weight: 75 kg (165 lb)

Sailing career
- Sport: Sailing
- Club: Yachting Club Pointe Rouge, Marseille
- Coached by: Xavier Rohart; Benjamin Bonneau (national)
- Class: 49er FX
Medal record
Representing France
European Championships
Bronze medal – third place	2013 Aarhus	49er FX

Julien d'Ortoli (born 7 October 1983) is a French sailor in the 49er FX class. Together with Noé Delpech he won a bronze medal at the 2013 European Championships and placed fifth at the 2016 Olympics.

D'Ortoli took up sailing in 1990 and since 2007 races with Delpech. The pair has a nickname Juno from the combination of the first two letters of their given names.
