= Li Fei (sailor) =

Chinese sailor (born 1983)

Li Fei (born March 22, 1983, in Qingdao) is a male Chinese sports sailor who will compete for Team China at the 2008 Summer Olympics.

== Major performances ==
- 2005 Asian Championships – 7th 470 class;
- 2005 National Championships – 1st 49er class
