= Evan DePaul =

Canadian sailor

Personal information
- Born: January 7, 1996 (age 30) Burlington, Ontario, Canada
- Height: 168 cm (5 ft 6 in)
- Weight: 80 kg (176 lb)

Sport
- Country: Canada
- Sport: Sailing
- Event: 49er
- Partner: Will Jones
- Retired: 2022
Medal record
49er Junior World Championships
Gold medal – first place	2017 Kingston	49er

Evan DePaul (born January 7, 1996) is a retired Canadian sailor in the 49er class with partner William Jones.

== Career ==
He began sailing in 2010 in the 420 class boats at the Royal Hamilton Yacht Club, and switched to the 49erFX class in 2015, when he teamed up with Will Jones. They later switched to the 49er class.

In 2017, DePaul and Jones won gold at the World Junior Sailing Championships in the 49er class.

In March 2021, DePaul was named to Canada's 2020 Olympic team with his partner William Jones, by being ranked as the top Canadian boat at the 2020 World Championships. DePaull and Jones finished 19th in Tokyo.

DePaul announced his retirement from competitive sailing October 27, 2022.
