= Thomas Plößel =

German sailor

Personal information
- Nationality: German
- Born: 29 April 1988 (age 38) Oldenburg, West Germany
- Height: 181 cm (5 ft 11 in)
- Weight: 80 kg (176 lb)

Sailing career
- Sport: Sailing
- Club: Norddeutscher Regatta Verein
- Class: 49er
Medal record
Sailing
Representing Germany
Event	1st	2nd	3rd
Olympic Games	0	0	2
Total	0	0	2
Olympic Games
Bronze medal – third place	2016 Rio de Janeiro	49er
Bronze medal – third place	2020 Tokyo	49er

Thomas Plößel (also transliterated Plössel or Ploessel, born 29 April 1988) is a German sailor. Together with Erik Heil, he won bronze medals in the 49er events at the 2016 Summer Olympics and the 2020 Summer Olympics.
