= Tom Pelsmaekers =

Belgian sailor

Tom Pelsmaekers (born 26 January 1993) is a Belgian sailor. He and Yannick Lefèbvre placed 17th in the 49er event at the 2016 Summer Olympics.
