= Cristóbal Grez =

Chilean sailor (born 1987)

Personal information
- Born: 17 December 1987 (age 38)

Sport
- Country: Chile
- Sport: Sailing

Cristóbal Grez (born 17 December 1987) is a Chilean competitive sailor. He competed at the 2016 Summer Olympics in Rio de Janeiro, in the men's 49er.
