= Klaus Lange (sailor) =

Argentine sailor (born 1995)

Personal information
- Nationality: Argentine
- Born: 13 January 1995 (age 31)

Sport
- Country: Argentina
- Sport: Sailing
Medal record
Men's sailing
Representing Argentina
Pan American Games
Silver medal – second place	2019 Lima	49er

Klaus Lange (born January 13, 1995) is an Argentine sailor. He and his brother Yago Lange placed seventh in the 49er event at the 2016 Summer Olympics. The brothers are the sons of six-time Olympic sailor Santiago Lange.
