= Gabriel Borges =

Brazilian sailor (born 1992)

Personal information
- Full name: Gabriel Portilho Borges
- Born: 24 February 1992 (age 34) Rio de Janeiro, Brazil

Sailing career
- Sport: Sailing
- Club: Rio Yacht Club
Medal record
Men's sailing
Representing Brazil
Pan American Games
Gold medal – first place	2019 Lima	49er

Gabriel Portilho Borges (Note: This name uses Portuguese naming customs: the first or maternal family name is Portilho and the second or paternal family name is Borges.) (born 24 February 1992) is a Brazilian sailor. He and Marco Grael placed 11th in the 49er event at the 2016 Summer Olympics.

He represented Brazil at the 2020 Summer Olympics.
