= Joseph Morris (sailor) =

American sailor (born 1989)

Joseph Morris (born August 17, 1989) is a sailor who lives in the United States and attended Yale University, where he earned the New England College Sailor of the Year Award in 2012. He was named captain twice (2011, 2012) and was a four-time ICSA All-American skipper. Prior to Yale, he was a five-time national champion.

He and teammate Thomas Barrows competed on behalf of the United States in the 2016 Rio Olympics, participating in the men's two-person high-performance 49er class event.

Morris and Barrows – who were also teammates at Yale – won the US Olympic Trials and qualified for Olympic selection from combined results of the Sailing World Cup in Miami, Fla. and the 49er World Championships in Clearwater.
