= José Costa (sailor) =

Portuguese sailor

José Luís Anica Costa (born 26 January 1984) is a Portuguese sailor. He and Jorge Lima placed 16th in the 49er event at the 2016 Summer Olympics.
