= Blair Tuke =

New Zealand sailor (born 1989)

Blair Tuke MNZM
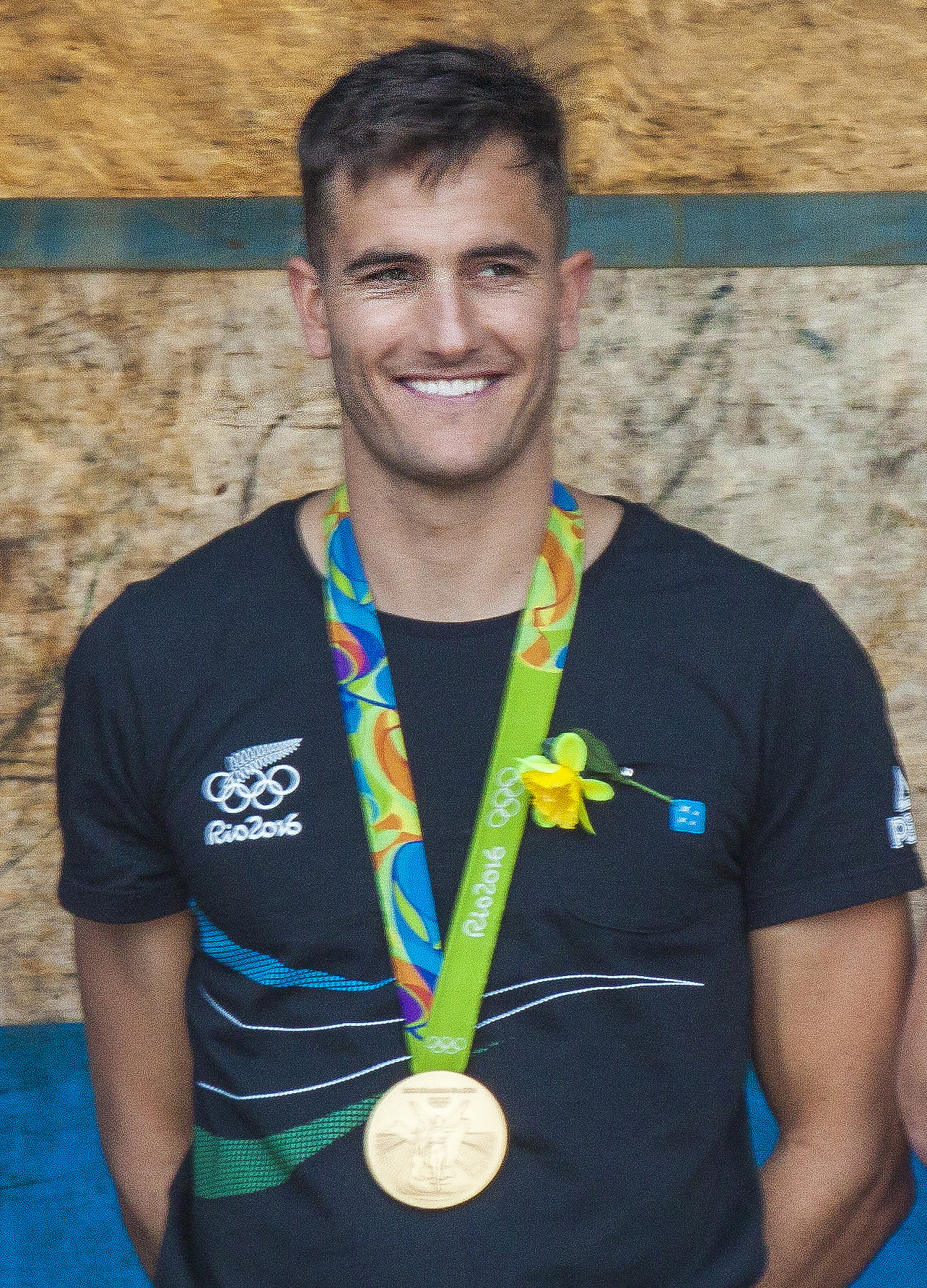
- Tuke in Kerikeri 2016

Personal information
- Full name: Andrew Blair Tuke
- Born: 25 July 1989 (age 37) Kawakawa, New Zealand
- Height: 1.81 m (5 ft 11 in)

Sailing career
- Sport: Sailing
- Classes: 49er; Splash; 29er; A-class cat; AC50; AC75; VO65
Medal record
Sailing
Representing New Zealand
Event	1st	2nd	3rd
Olympic Games	1	2	0
World championships	8	3	1
Total	9	5	1
Olympic Games
Gold medal – first place	2016 Rio de Janeiro	49er class
Silver medal – second place	2012 London	49er class
Silver medal – second place	2020 Tokyo	49er class
World Championships
Gold medal – first place	2006 Lake Garda	Splash
Gold medal – first place	2009 Lake Garda	29er
Gold medal – first place	2013 Marseille	49er
Gold medal – first place	2014 Santander	49er
Gold medal – first place	2015 Buenos Aires	49er
Gold medal – first place	2016 Clearwater	49er
Gold medal – first place	2019 Auckland	49er
Gold medal – first place	2020 Geelong	49er
Silver medal – second place	2011 Perth	49er
Silver medal – second place	2012 Zadar	49er
Silver medal – second place	2014 Auckland	A-class
Bronze medal – third place	2018 Hervey Bay	A-class

Andrew Blair Tuke MNZM (born 25 July 1989) is a New Zealand sailor who won the 2021 Americas Cup Held in Auckland and also won the 2017 Version held in Bermuda. He also won the gold medal at the 2016 Summer Olympics, and the silver medal at the 2012 Summer Olympics in the 49er class alongside Peter Burling.

He is a founder of Live Ocean – a registered New Zealand charity which supports and invests in promising marine science, innovation, technology and marine conservation projects.

Tuke with Burling was co-captain of the New Zealand team at the 2016 Olympics. They are just the 4th New Zealand flagbearers to win a gold medal at the same Olympics.

Burling and Tuke won the 2016 Olympics with two races to spare and by an overall 43-point margin – winning by the most points of any sailing class in the Olympics since 1968 (when the modern scoring system started). They finished ahead of the second placed (Australian) boat in 11 of the 13 races, being behind by just three points in race 3 and one point in race 10.

Tuke and Burling won Silver at the 2021 Tokyo Olympics, missing the gold medal on countback.

Burling and Tuke were named New Zealand sports Team of the Year at the Halberg Awards in Feb 2017.

At the 2012 London Olympics, Burling and Tuke were the youngest team. Their silver medal was New Zealand's 100th Olympic medal.

Tuke and Burling are the first sailors to win six 49er class World Championships (2013, 2014, 2015, 2016, 2019 and 2020). They won all 28 of the major regattas in the 49er between the London Olympics (2012) and the Rio Olympics (2016). The only 49er regatta they did not win in the four-year period was third place at a short training regatta in July 2016. In 2013, Tuke was a member of the New Zealand team which won the inaugural Red Bull Youth America's Cup.

In November 2015 the International Sailing Federation announced that Tuke and Burling were the ISAF Rolex World Male Sailors of the year.

Burling and Tuke were named as Members of the New Zealand Order of Merit for services to sailing in the New Years Honours 2017.

Tuke is a member of Emirates Team New Zealand that have won the 35th America's Cup, 36th America's Cup and recently the 37th America's Cup. He sailed on Mapfre, finishing second in the 2017–18 Volvo Ocean Race.

Together with Peter Burling, he is joint CEO of the New Zealand SailGP team.

== Personal life ==
Tuke attended Riverview Primary School and then Kerikeri High School before going to St Kentigern College in Pakuranga, Auckland. He learned to sail at the Kerikeri High School sailing academy and the Kerikeri Cruising Club, of which he is still a member. Tuke is a qualified electrician.

Tuke became a father in 2026, with long-term partner Mikayla Plew.

== Career ==
Tuke and Burling won the 49er World Championship in 2013, 2014, 2015, 2016, 2019 and 2020, and the 49er European championships in 2013, 2014, 2015, 2016 and 2019. They won all 28 of the major regattas in the 49er between the London Olympics (2012) and the Rio Olympics (2016) (a record for this Olympic class).

Tuke and Burling were awarded the ISAF World Male Sailor of the Year for 2015.

Tuke was a key member of the Emirates Team New Zealand sailing team which won the America's Cup in Bermuda in 2017, Auckland in 2021, and Barcelona in 2024.

=== America's Cup ===
- (gold) 2017 – 35th America's Cup – Emirates Team New Zealand (foils controller)
- (gold) 2021 – 36th America's Cup – Emirates Team New Zealand (foils controller)
- (gold) 2024 – 37th America's Cup – Emirates Team New Zealand (foils controller)

=== Olympic Games ===
- (silver) 2021 – 49er class with Peter Burling
- (gold) 2016 – 49er class with Peter Burling
- (silver) 2012 – 49er class with Peter Burling

==== World Championship titles ====
- (gold) 2020 – 49er World Championship – Geelong, Australia (with Peter Burling)
- (gold) 2019 – 49er World Championship – Auckland, New Zealand (with Peter Burling)
- (gold) 2016 – 49er World Championship – Clearwater, Florida, USA (with Peter Burling)
- (gold) 2015 – 49er World Champion – Buenos Aires, Argentina (with Peter Burling)
- (gold) 2014 – 49er World Champion – Santander, Spain (with Peter Burling)
- (gold) 2013 – 49er World Champion Marseille, France (with Peter Burling)
- (gold) 2009 – 29er World Championship with Stephen Thomas (AUS)
- (gold) 2006 – Splash World Championship

==== Other World Championship results ====
- (bronze) 3rd – 2018 – 3rd A-Cat World Championship – Hervey Bay, Australia
- (silver) 2nd – 2014 – 2nd A-Cat World Championship – Auckland, New Zealand
- (silver) 2nd – 2012 – 2nd 49er World Championship – Croatia (with Peter Burling)
- (silver) 2nd – 2011 – 2nd 49er World Championship – Perth, Australia (with Peter Burling)
- (silver) 2nd – 2007 ISAF Youth Worlds – 29er Class
- 6th – 2015 – Moth World Championship – (Australia)
- 8th – 2013 – A-Cat World Championship – (USA)
- 8th – 2007 – 420 World Championships (Auckland)
- 9th – 2008 – 29er World Championship
- 17th – 2010 – 49er World Championship – Bahamas (with Peter Burling)
- 26th – 2009 – 49er World Championship – Lake Garda, Italy (with Peter Burling)
- 26th – 2008 – Tornado World Championship
- 31st – 2004 – Splash World Championship
- 6th – 2002 – Splash World Championship

=== Other achievements ===
2013, 2014, 2015 and 2016 Unbeaten in major 49er regattas worldwide (27 49er regatta victories since London Olympics).

==== 2020 49er regattas:- ====
2020 (gold) – 49er World Championships – Geelong, Australia with Peter Burling)

2020 (silver) 2nd 49er Oceanias (sailing with Peter Burling)

==== 2019 49er regattas:- ====
2019 (gold) – 49er World Championships – Auckland, New Zealand with Peter Burling)

2019 (bronze) 3rd 49er Oceanias (sailing with Peter Burling)

2019 7th Princessa Sofia Regatta (sailing with Peter Burling)

2019 (bronze) 3rd World Cup Regatta Genoa (sailing with Peter Burling)

2019 (gold) 1st 49er Europeans (sailing with Peter Burling)

2019 (gold) 1st 49er Olympic test event (sailing with Peter Burling)

==== 2017 ====
2017 (gold) 1st Swan River Match Cup (Perth) – sailing with Peter Burling, Glenn Ashby and Josh Junior.

==== 2016 49er regattas ====
2016 (gold) 1st 49er 2016 Olympics with Peter Burling

2016 (bronze) 3rd 49er Rio de Janeiro International Sailing week

2016 (gold) 1st 49er Kieler Woche regatta, Germany (with Peter Burling)

2016 (gold) 1st 49er Sailing World Cup Hyeres regatta, France (with Peter Burling)

2016 (gold) 1st 49er European Championships – Barcelona, Spain (with Peter Burling)

2016 (gold) 1st 49er World Championships – Clearwater, Florida, USA (with Peter Burling)

2016 (gold) 1st 49er NZL Nationals (with Peter Burling)

==== 2016 America's Cup World series regattas ====
Crewing for Emirates Team New Zealand

2016 (gold) 1st America's Cup World Series regatta, New York

2016 (bronze) 3rd America's Cup World Series regatta, Oman

2016 4th America's Cup World Series regatta, Chicago

2016 5th Americas Cup World Series regatta, Toulon, France

==== 2015 49er regattas ====
2015 (gold) 1st 49er World Champs, Buenos Aires (with Peter Burling)

2015 (gold) 1st 49er South American Champs, Buenos Aires (with Peter Burling)(Nov 2015)

2015 (gold) 1st 49er Olympic Test Event, Rio de Janeiro (with Peter Burling)(Aug 2015)

2015 (gold) 1st 49er Rio de Janeiro International sailing week (with Peter Burling)(Aug 2015)

2015 (gold) 1st 49er Europeans (Porto, Portugal) (with Peter Burling)

2015 (gold) 1st 49er ISAF Sailing World Cup Weymouth regatta (Weymouth, England) (with Peter Burling)

2015 (gold) 1st 49er ISAF Sailing World Cup Hyeres regatta (Hyeres, France) (with Peter Burling)

2015 (gold) 1st 49er Princess Sofia Regatta (Palma, Mallorca) (with Peter Burling)

2015 (gold) 1st 49er Sail Auckland (with Peter Burling)

2015 (gold) 1st 49er NZL Nationals (with Peter Burling)

==== 2015 America's Cup World Series regattas ====
Crewing for Emirates Team New Zealand – overall leader of 2015 America's Cup World Series

2015 (silver) 2nd America's Cup World Series Bermuda (Oct 2015)

2015 (gold) 1st America's Cup World Series Gothenburg (Aug 2015)

2015 (silver) 2nd America's Cup World Series Portsmouth

==== 2014 ====
2014 (gold) 1st 49er Intergalactic Championships, Rio de Janeiro (with Peter Burling)

2014 (gold) 1st 49er South American Championships, Rio de Janeiro (with Peter Burling)

2014 (gold) 1st 49er Rio International Regatta, Rio de Janeiro (with Peter Burling)

2014 (gold) 1st 49er European Championships, Helsinki (with Peter Burling)

2014 (gold) 1st 49er Hyeres World cup regatta (with Peter Burling)

2014 (gold) 1st 49er Mallorca World cup regatta (with Peter Burling)

==== 2013 and previous ====
2013 (gold) 1st – Red Bull Youth America's Cup (Tactician for NZL sailing team)

2013 (gold) 1st 49er European Championships (Aarhus, Denmark) (with Peter Burling)

2013 (gold) 1st 49er Sail Auckland (with Peter Burling)

2010 (gold) 1st 49er North American Championships (with Peter Burling)

2009 Completed 120 nm Coastal Classic course in 49er (Auckland to Russell) with Peter Burling

2009 (gold) New Zealand National Youth Matchracing Champion (with Peter Burling and Scott Burling) 2006 wins world championship splash

== Awards ==
- Member of the New Zealand Order of Merit for services to sailing, 2017 New Year Honours.
- Finalist, Rolex World Sailor of the Year 2016 (with Peter Burling)
- ISAF Rolex World Male Sailor of the year 2015 (with Peter Burling)
- Lonsdale Cup (NZOC) 2020 (with Peter Burling) "for a New Zealand athlete (or team) who has demonstrated the most outstanding contribution to an Olympic or Commonwealth sport during the previous year."
- Finalist, Rolex World Sailor of the Year 2014 (with Peter Burling)
- Yachting New Zealand Sailor of the Year 2013, 2014, 2015, 2016 (with Peter Burling)
- Finalist Halberg awards (New Zealand), Team of the Year (with Peter Burling) 2012, 2013, 2014, 2015, 2016.
- Winner, Far North District Council Supreme Sports Award 2009-10-11-12-13-14-15-16-17, Top Energy Far North Sportsman of the Year 2016–17 and ASB Code Sailing Award 2016–17.
- Halberg Sports Team of the Year 2016. (with Peter Burling)

Awards
Preceded by All Blacks	Halberg Awards – New Zealand Team of the Year; 2016; With: Peter Burling	Succeeded by Team New Zealand
Preceded by Silver Ferns	Lonsdale Cup; 2020; With: Peter Burling	Succeeded by Lisa Carrington
