= Benjamín Grez =

Chilean sailor (born 1992)

Personal information
- Full name: Benjamín José Grez Ahrens
- Nationality: Chile
- Born: 3 December 1992 (age 33) Santiago, Chile
- Height: 1.77 m (5 ft 9 1/2 in)
- Weight: 66 kg (146 lb)

Sport

Sailing career
- Class: Dinghy
- Club: Team VTR
- Coach: Cristian Noe

Benjamín José Grez Ahrens (Note: In this Spanish name, the first or paternal surname is Grez and the second or maternal family name is Ahrens.) (born 3 December 1992 in Santiago) is a Chilean sailor, who specialized in two-person dinghy (470) class. He represented Chile, along with his partner Diego González, at the 2012 Summer Olympics, and has also been training throughout most of his sporting career for Team VTR Yacht Club in his native Santiago, under his personal coach Cristian Noe. As of June 2015, Grez is ranked among the top 200 sailors in the world for the two-person dinghy class by the International Sailing Federation.

Being one of the youngest members of the Chilean team, Grez qualified in the men's 470 class at the 2012 Summer Olympics in London by having achieved a berth and finishing thirty-first from the World Championships in Barcelona, Spain. Teaming up with his partner and crew member González in the opening series, the Chilean duo recorded a grade of 196 net points to establish a last position in a fleet of twenty-seven boats.
