= Peter Burling (sailor) =

New Zealand sailor (born 1991)

Peter Burling MNZM
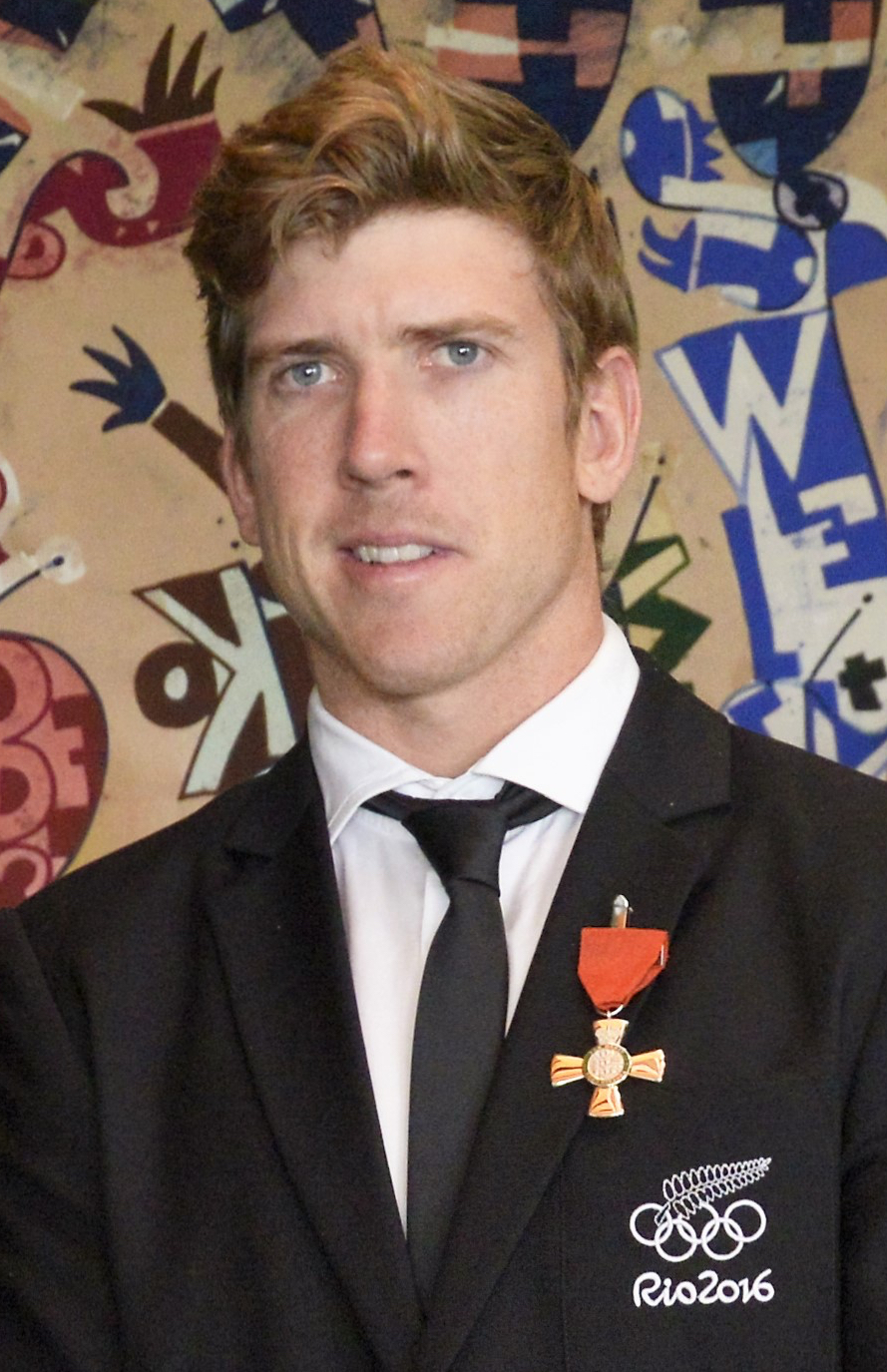
- Burling in 2018

Personal information
- Born: 1 January 1991 (age 35) Tauranga, New Zealand
- Height: 1.86 m (6 ft 1 in)

Sailing career
- Sport: Sailing
- Class: 49er
Medal record
Representing New Zealand
Sailing
Event	1st	2nd	3rd
Olympic Games	1	2	0
World championships	9	3	2
Total	10	5	2
Olympic Games
Gold medal – first place	2016 Rio de Janeiro	49er class
Silver medal – second place	2020 Tokyo	49er class
Silver medal – second place	2012 London	49er class
World championships
Gold medal – first place	2020 Geelong	49er
Gold medal – first place	2019 Auckland	49er
Gold medal – first place	2016 Clearwater	49er
Gold medal – first place	2015 Buenos Aires	49er
Gold medal – first place	2015 Sorrento	Int. Moth
Gold medal – first place	2014 Santander	49er
Gold medal – first place	2013 Marseille	49er
Gold medal – first place	2007 Auckland	420
Gold medal – first place	2006 Canary Islands	420
Silver medal – second place	2017 Garda	Int. Moth
Silver medal – second place	2012 Zadar	49er
Silver medal – second place	2011 Perth	49er
Bronze medal – third place	2014 Auckland	A-class
Bronze medal – third place	2009 Perth	Team racing

Peter Burling MNZM (born 1 January 1991) is a New Zealand sailor. He is a three-time winning helmsman of the America's Cup for Emirates Team New Zealand in 2017, 2021, and 2024, and a three-time Olympic medalist in the 49er class, of which 2016 was a gold medal together with Blair Tuke. He has also won six editions of the 49er World Championship, two 420 World Championships and the 2015 Moth World Championship. In offshore racing, Burling completed the 2017–18 Volvo Ocean Race with Team Brunel, finishing third. Burling won line honours in the 2025 Fastnet race on SVR-Lazartigue.

Burling's awards include the New Zealand Order of Merit for services to sailing, the male World Sailor of the Year in 2015 (together with Tuke) and 2017, and the Magnus Olsson Prize in 2020.

== Early life and education ==
Burling was born in 1991 in Tauranga. His education began at Welcome Bay School and Tauranga Intermediate School. He started sailing at the age of six in the Welcome Bay estuary near his home in Tauranga, in an old wooden Optimist called Jellytip. At the age of eight, he joined Tauranga Yacht Club and started competing.

Burling attended high school at Tauranga Boys' College, also attended at the time by cricketer Kane Williamson. Later, he studied mechanical engineering at the University of Auckland where he completed half of the 4-year degree.

== Sailing career ==
=== Early career ===
Burling sailed in his first Optimist nationals at age nine. At the age of eleven, in 2002, Burling finished second in the New Zealand Optimist Nationals (under-16). He competed in the 2002 Optimist World Championship in Texas at the age of 11. In 2003, at the age of 12, Burling won the New Zealand Optimist Nationals and competed in the 2003 Optimist Worlds in the Canary Islands where he finished 40th. He stopped sailing the Optimist at age 12.

At age 13, he was second in the New Zealand P-class nationals (under 17), to Timaru local hero Thomas Olds. He won the NZ Starling nationals (under 19) – (winning both the fleet racing and matchracing titles) twice – at age 14 and 15.

At the age of 15, Burling and Carl Evans won the 2006 420 World Championships in the Canary Islands – the youngest sailors ever to do so. They also became the under-16 and under-18 world champions. At 16 years old, Burling successfully defended his 420 title to win the 420 World Championships sailed in Auckland. He also won the under-18 world championship. Burling finished 6th in the 2007 470 European Championships – his first international 470 regatta and had his best world ranking in the 470 of 5th in 2008.

=== Olympic classes ===
Burling finished 11th in the 470 class at the 2008 Olympics. At 17 years old (still at school), he was the youngest sailor ever to represent New Zealand at the Olympic Games. Burling was the youngest sailing competitor at the 2008 Olympics and the youngest member of the 2008 New Zealand Olympic team.

At the 2012 London Olympics, Burling (then aged 21) was the youngest 49er sailor. He won the silver medal as helm in the 49er class alongside Blair Tuke. His silver medal was, jointly, New Zealand's 100th Olympic medal.

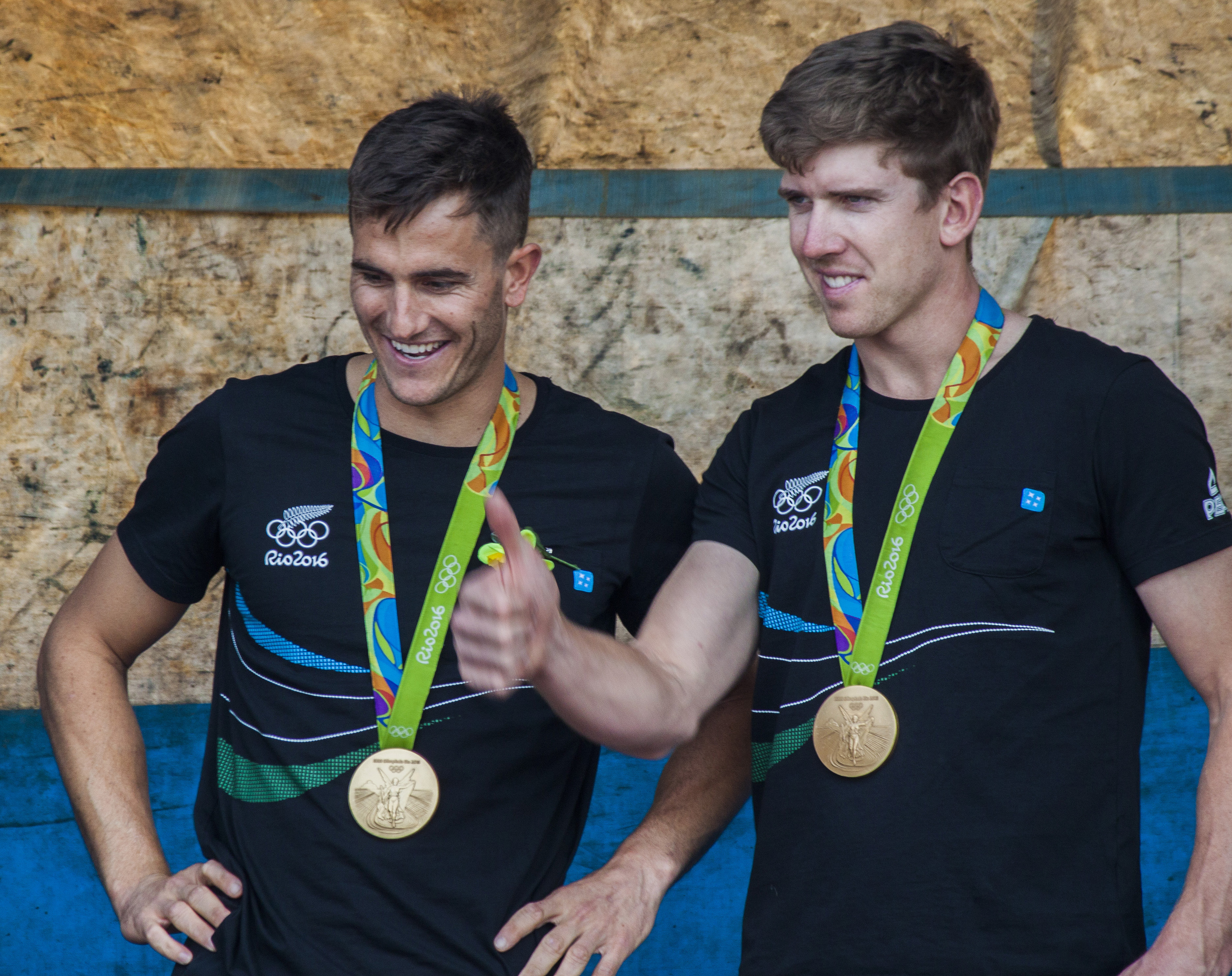
Burling (right) and Blair Tuke wearing their Olympic gold medals in 2016

Burling with Blair Tuke were Olympic flag bearers for New Zealand at the 2016 Olympics. They were just the 4th New Zealand flagbearers to win a gold medal at the same Olympics. At age 25, Burling was the youngest ever 49er Olympic gold medal skipper. He and Tuke won the 2016 Olympics with two races to spare and by an overall 43-point margin – winning by the most points of any sailing class in the Olympics in over 50 years.

Burling and Tuke won silver at the 2021 Tokyo Olympics – missing the gold medal on countback.

Burling and Tuke are the first sailors to win six 49er class World Championships (2013, 2014, 2015, 2016, 2019 and 2020). They won all 28 of the major regattas in the 49er between the London Olympics (2012) and the Rio Olympics (2016). The only regatta they did not win in this time was when they finished 3rd in a short 2-day regatta prior to the Olympics. In all the major regattas (Olympics, Worlds, Europeans, World Cup) in 2015 and 2016 they led into the medal races by over 20 points – effectively winning the regattas before the medal race.

=== America's Cup ===
Burling approached America's Cup sailing by helming for Team Korea's White Tiger Challenge, in the 2011–13 America's Cup World Series in San Francisco in 2012. He then skippered the New Zealand Sailing Team entry to victory in the inaugural Red Bull Youth America's Cup in San Francisco in September 2013.

For the 2017 America's Cup, he became the helmsman for Emirates Team New Zealand's campaign. The racing was held in Bermuda. Burling helmed the New Zealand boat to the America's Cup match by beating Artemis Racing in the 2017 Louis Vuitton Challenger's Trophy finals. On 27 June 2017, he became the youngest winning helmsman in the history of the America's Cup, when at age 26 he and his team won the 35th competition for the cup.

Burling was the winning skipper and helmsman for Emirates Team New Zealand's 2021 America's Cup campaign. Emirates Team New Zealand won the 2021 America's Cup event in Auckland on 17 March 2021. Burling at 30 years, 2 months became the youngest ever skipper to win the America's Cup.

Emirates Team New Zealand won the 2024 America's Cup in Barcelona on 20 October 2024. Peter Burling was the skipper and joint helmsman with Nathan Outteridge. (The AC75 yachts have two helmsmen.) Peter Burling became only the second helmsman to win three America's Cups in consecutive contests after Harold Stirling Vanderbilt (1930, 1934 and, 1937). Burling has won 22 America's Cup races, beating the record of 17 previously held by Jimmy Spithill.

Emirates Team New Zealand announced Burling's departure from the team on 11 April 2025.

On 20 June 2025, Luna Rossa Prada Pirelli announced the addition of Burling to their sailing team. They have yet to specify the nature of his role.

=== Offshore sailing ===
In 2013, Burling sailed the Sydney to Hobart Yacht Race with Pretty Fly 3, finishing 14th overall. In 2014. he finished fourth in the Auckland to Fiji Yacht Race on Wired. In 2017, Burling finished third overall in the Fastnet Race, sailing on Nikita. He sailed the Fastnet race in 2025 for the second time, taking line honours on SVR-Lazartigue.

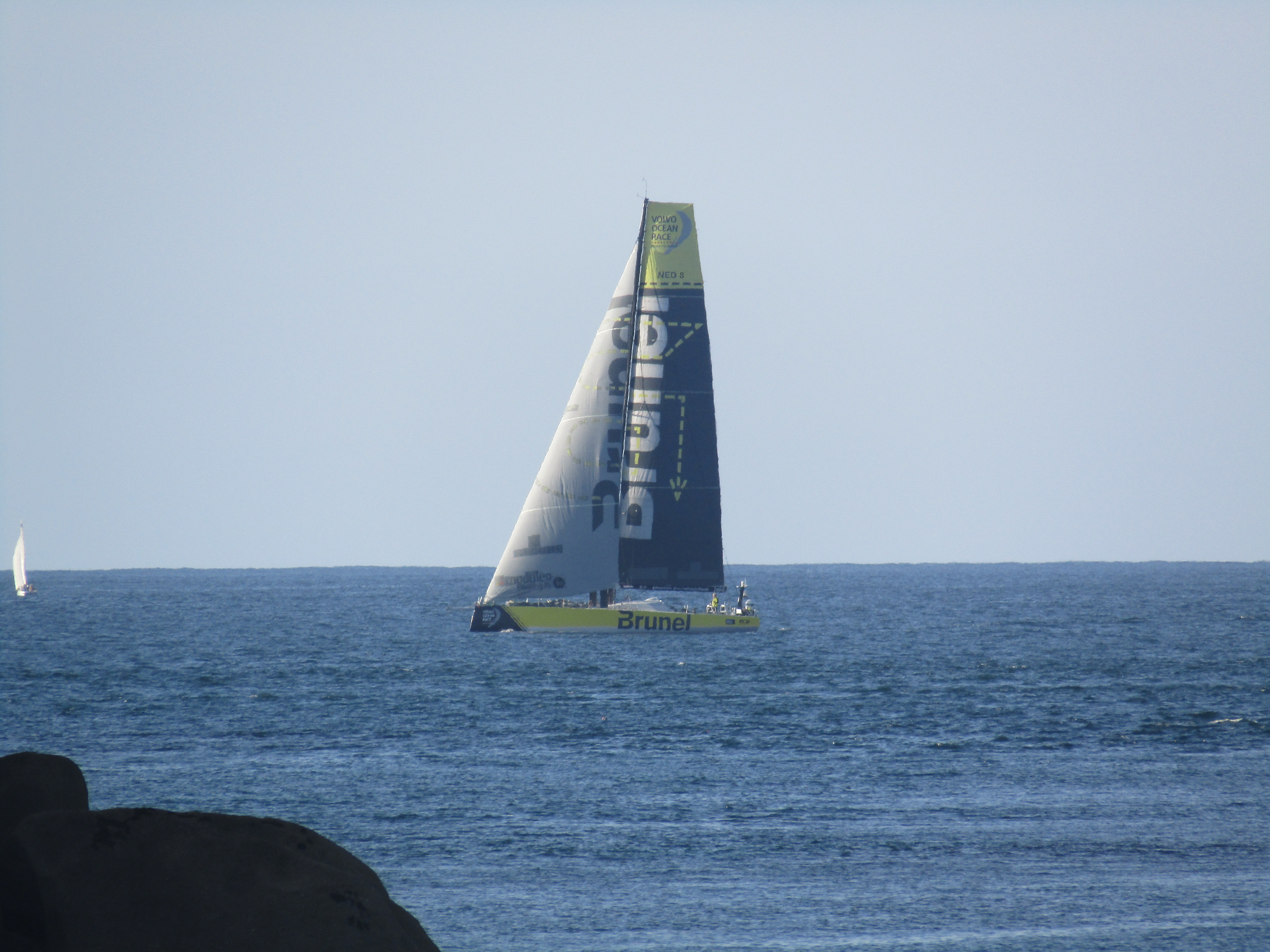
Team Brunel during the 2017–18 Volvo Ocean Race

Burling sailed as watch captain and helmsman with Team Brunel on the round-the-world 2017–18 Volvo Ocean Race finishing third overall in the closest finish in the history of the race, with the top three boats going into the final leg effectively tied on points and finishing just 25 minutes apart. Team Brunel won three of the final five legs, including the leg from Auckland to Brazil, which the organisers say was the hardest leg in the history of the race.

=== SailGP ===
Together with Blair Tuke, he was named joint-CEO of the New Zealand SailGP Team in 2020.

Burling is the helmsman and co-CEO (with Blair Tuke) of the New Zealand boat Amokura. 5th overall in season 2 (their first season in the competition) 2nd in season 3 3rd, though overall season points leader in season 4, winning 5 events.

=== Other sailing ===
Burling was the 2015 International Moth World Champion. He was 2nd in the 2017 Moth Worlds. He finished 3rd in the 2014 A class catamaran Worlds.

== Personal life ==
Burling married long time partner, Lucinda Nelson, on the weekend of 4 March 2023 in the Coromandel Peninsula, on New Zealand's North Island. Teammates & friends Blair Tuke, Andy Maloney, and Josh Junior were his groomsmen.

Burling is a founder of Live Ocean – a registered New Zealand charity which supports and invests in promising marine science, innovation, technology and marine conservation projects.

== Awards ==
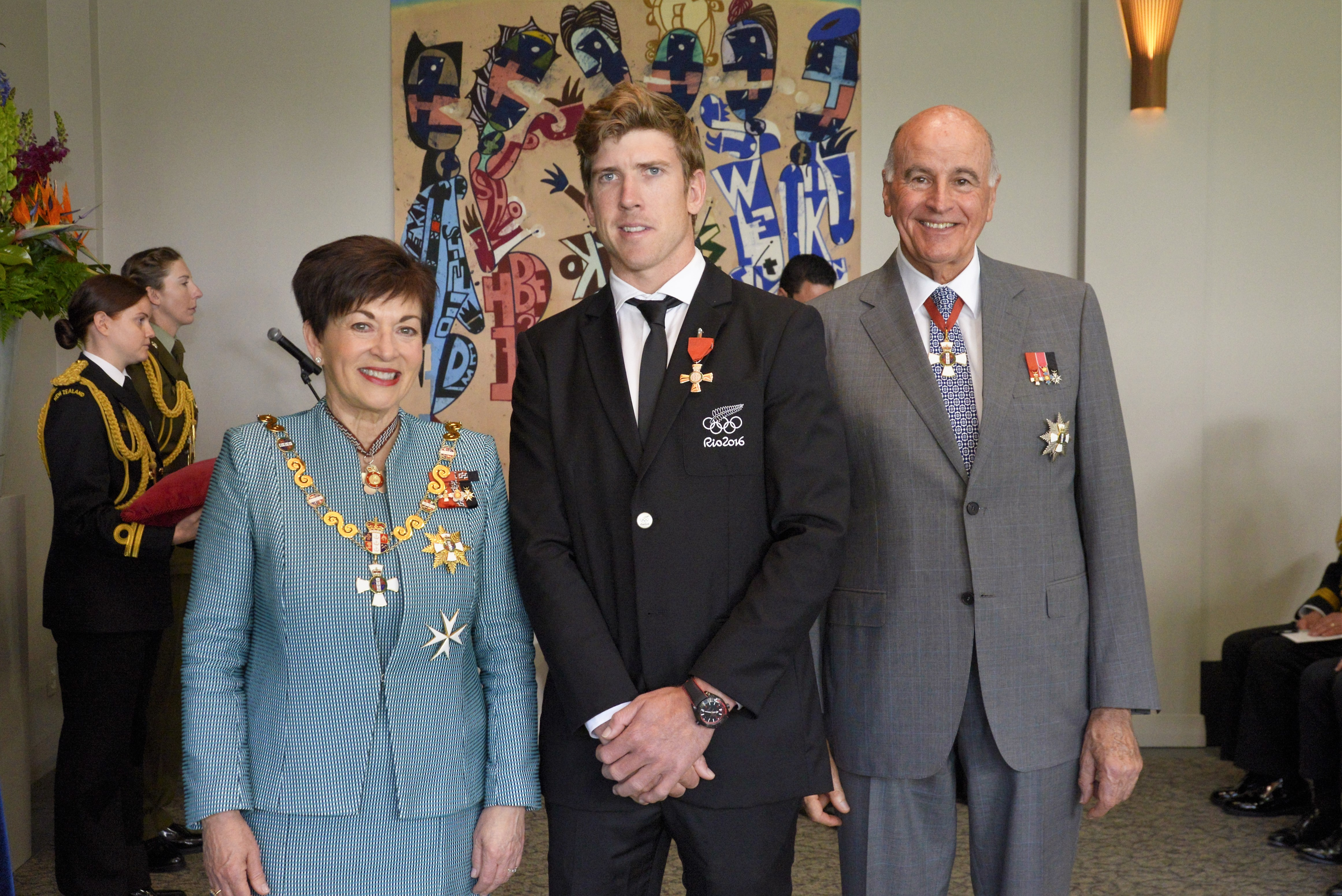
Burling at his investiture as New Zealand Order of Merit in 2018

- Member of the New Zealand Order of Merit for services to sailing, 2017 New Year Honours.
- ISAF Rolex World Male Sailor of the year 2017
- ISAF Rolex World Male Sailor of the year 2015 (with Blair Tuke)
- Magnus Olsson prize 2020 "for an indelible contribution to the world of sailing.""
- Lonsdale Cup (NZOC) 2020 (With Blair Tuke) "for a New Zealand athlete (or team) who has demonstrated the most outstanding contribution to an Olympic or Commonwealth sport during the previous year."
- Finalist, Rolex World Sailor of the Year 2014, 2015, 2016 (with Blair Tuke), 2017, 2021.
- Yachting New Zealand Sailor of the Year 2013, 2014, 2015, 2016 (with Blair Tuke)
- Yachting New Zealand Young Sailor of the Year 2006, 2007, 2008, 2011
- Halberg Sports Team of the Year 2016. (with Blair Tuke)
- Finalist Halberg awards (New Zealand), Team of the Year (with Blair Tuke) 2012, 2013, 2014, 2015, 2016.

== Sailing results ==
=== Volvo Ocean Race ===
- (bronze) 2017–2018 – Volvo Ocean Race – Team Brunel (helmsman and watch captain)

=== America's Cup ===
- (gold) 2024 – 37th America's Cup – Emirates Team New Zealand (helmsman and skipper)
- (gold) 2021 – 36th America's Cup – Emirates Team New Zealand (helmsman and skipper)
- (gold) 2017 – 35th America's Cup – Emirates Team New Zealand (helmsman)

=== Olympic Games ===
- (silver) 2021 – 49er class with Blair Tuke
- (gold) 2016 – 49er class with Blair Tuke
- (silver) 2012 – 49er class with Blair Tuke (age 21)
- 11th 2008 – 470 class with Carl Evans (age 17)

=== World Championships ===
==== World Championship titles ====
- (gold) 2020 – 49er World Champion – Geelong, Australia (with Blair Tuke)
- (gold) 2019 – 49er World Champion – Auckland, New Zealand (with Blair Tuke)
- (gold) 2016 – 49er World Champion – Clearwater, Florida, USA (with Blair Tuke)
- (gold) 2015 – 49er World Champion – Buenos Aires, Argentina (with Blair Tuke)
- (gold) 2015 – Moth World Champion – Sorrento, Australia.
- (gold) 2014 – 49er World Champion – Santander, Spain (with Blair Tuke)
- (gold) 2013 – 49er World Champion Marseille, France (with Blair Tuke)
- (gold) 2007 – 420 Open World Champion, age 16.
- (gold) 2006 – 420 Open World Champion, age 15.

==== Other World Championship results ====
- (silver) 2nd – 2017 – 2nd Int Moth World Championships – Lake Garda, Italy
- (silver) 2nd – 2012 – 2nd 49er World Championships – Croatia (with Blair Tuke)
- (silver) 2nd – 2011 – 2nd 49er World Championships – Perth, Australia (with Blair Tuke)
- (bronze) 3rd – 2014 – 3rd A class catamaran World Championships – Auckland, New Zealand (first rookie)
- (bronze) 3rd – 2009 – 3rd ISAF Teams Racing Worlds – Perth, Australia
- 4th – 2019 – A class World Championships Australia
- 10th – 2013 – Moth World Championships Hawaii
- 4th – 2011 – Moth World Championships Lake Macquarie, Australia
- 17th – 2010 – 49er World Championships – Bahamas (with Blair Tuke)
- 26th – 2009 – 49er World Championships – Lake Garda, Italy (with Blair Tuke)
- 11th – 2008 – 470 World Championships (with Carl Evans)age 17
- 45th – 2007 – 470 World Championships (with Carl Evans) age 16
- 6th – 2005 – 420 Open World Championships (helm)
- 40th – 2003 – Optimist World Championship – Canary Islands (age 12)
- 116th – 2002 – Optimist World Championship – Texas (age 11).

=== Other achievements ===
2013, 2014, 2015 and 2016 Unbeaten in major 49er regattas worldwide (27 49er regatta victories since London Olympics).

2013 Skipper of the winning boat in the Red Bull Youth America's Cup.

==== 2020:- ====
2020 (gold) 1st Prada America's Cup World Series Auckland (skipper and helm for Emirates Team New Zealand)

==== 2020 49er regattas:- ====
2020 (gold) 1st 49er World Championships – Geelong, Australia (sailing with Blair Tuke)

2020 (silver) 2nd 49er Oceanias (sailing with Blair Tuke)

==== 2019 49er regattas:- ====
2019 (gold) 1st 49er World Championships – Auckland, New Zealand (sailing with Blair Tuke)

2019 (bronze) 3rd 49er Oceanias (sailing with Blair Tuke)

2019 7th Princessa Sofia Regatta (sailing with Blair Tuke)

2019 (bronze) 3rd World Cup Regatta Genoa (sailing with Blair Tuke)

2019 (gold) 1st 49er Europeans (sailing with Blair Tuke)

2019 (gold) 1st 49er Olympic test event (sailing with Blair Tuke)

==== 2017:- ====
2017 Rolex Fastnet race 3rd (Line honours) (sailing on Nikita)

2017 (silver) 2nd – 2017 – 2nd Int Moth World Championships – Lake Garda, Italy

2017 (gold) 1st (Emirates Team New Zealand) America's Cup. – Helm

2017 (gold) 1st (Emirates Team New Zealand) Louis Vuitton America's Cup Challenger Playoffs Finals – Helm

2017 (gold) 1st Swan River Match Cup (Perth) – helm, sailing with Blair Tuke, Glenn Ashby, Josh Junior.

==== 2016 49er regattas:- ====
2016 (gold) 1st 49er Rio Olympics

2016 (bronze) 3rd 49er Rio de Janeiro International Sailing week

2016 (gold) 1st 49er Kiel Week regatta, Germany (with Blair Tuke)

2016 (gold) 1st 49er Sailing World Cup Hyères regatta, France (with Blair Tuke)

2016 (gold) 1st 49er European Championships – Barcelona, Spain (with Blair Tuke)

2016 (gold) 1st 49er World Championships – Clearwater, Florida, USA (with Blair Tuke)

2016 (gold) 1st 49er NZL Nationals (with Blair Tuke)

==== 2016 America's Cup World Series regattas ====
Helm for Emirates Team New Zealand

2015–2016 (bronze) 3rd overall in 2015–2016 America's Cup World Series.

2016 (gold) 1st America's Cup World Series regatta, New York

2016 (bronze) 3rd America's Cup World Series regatta, Oman

2016 4th America's Cup World Series regatta, Chicago

2016 5th America's Cup World Series regatta, Toulon, France

2016 4th America's Cup World Series regatta, Japan

==== 2015 49er regattas:- ====
2015 (gold) 1st 49er World Championships – Buenos Aires, Argentina (with Blair Tuke)

2015 (gold) 1st 49er South American Champs, Buenos Aires (with Blair Tuke)

2015 (gold) 1st 49er Olympic Test Event, Rio de Janeiro (with Blair Tuke)(Aug 2015)

2015 (gold) 1st 49er Rio de Janeiro International sailing week (with Blair Tuke)(Aug 2015)

2015 (gold) 1st 49er Europeans (Porto, Portugal) (with Blair Tuke)

2015 (gold) 1st 49er ISAF Sailing World Cup Weymouth regatta (Weymouth, England) (with Blair Tuke)

2015 (gold) 1st 49er ISAF Sailing World Cup Hyères regatta (Hyères, France) (with Blair Tuke)

2015 (gold) 1st 49er Princess Sofia Regatta (Palma, Mallorca) (with Blair Tuke)

2015 (gold) 1st 49er Sail Auckland (with Blair Tuke)

2015 (gold) 1st 49er NZL Nationals (with Blair Tuke)

==== 2015 America's Cup World Series regattas ====
Helm for Emirates Team New Zealand – overall leader of 2015 America's Cup World Series.

2015 (silver) 2nd America's Cup World Series Bermuda (Oct 2015)

2015 (gold) 1st America's Cup World Series Gothenburg (Aug 2015)

2015 (silver) 2nd America's Cup World Series Portsmouth

==== 2014 ====
2014 (gold) 1st 49er Intergalactic Championships, Rio de Janeiro (with Blair Tuke)

2014 (gold) 1st 49er South American Championships, Rio de Janeiro (with Blair Tuke)

2014 (gold) 1st 49er World Championships – Santander, Spain (with Blair Tuke)

2014 (gold) 1st 49er Rio International Regatta, Rio de Janeiro (with Blair Tuke)

2014 (gold) 1st 49er European Championships, Helsinki (with Blair Tuke)

2014 (gold) 1st 49er Hyères World cup regatta (with Blair Tuke)

2014 (gold) 1st 49er Mallorca World cup regatta (with Blair Tuke)

2014 (bronze) 3rd Extreme Sailing series St Petersburg, Russia (helming for Emirates Team New Zealand)

2014 (bronze) 3rd Extreme Sailing series Qingdao, China (helming for Emirates Team New Zealand)

2014 4th Auckland-to-Fiji yacht race (sailing on Wired)

2014 (gold) 1st A class NZ Nationals (Pre-worlds, 65 International competitors, his first competition in A class)

==== 2013 and previous ====
2013 14th (Line Honours) Sydney-to-Hobart race sailing on Pretty Fly 3

2013 (gold) 1st – Red Bull Youth America's Cup (skipper/ helm for NZL sailing team)

2013 (gold) 1st 49er European Championships (Aarhus, Denmark)

2013 (gold) 1st – Australian Moth Nationals

2013 (silver) 2nd China cup (Tactician for Team Vatti)

2013 (gold) 1st 49er Sail Auckland (with Blair Tuke)

2012 (gold) 1st China cup (Tactician for Team Vatti)

2010 (gold) 1st 49er North American Championships (with Blair Tuke)

2009 Completed 120 nm Coastal Classic course in 49er (Auckland to Russell) with Blair Tuke

2009 (gold) New Zealand National Youth Matchracing Champion (with Blair Tuke and Scott Burling)

2008 (silver) 2nd New Zealand Keelboat Nationals

2008 (gold) New Zealand Champion in Elliot 5.9 (helm)

2006 (gold) New Zealand Champion in Starling (age 15)

2006 (gold) New Zealand Champion in 420 (age 15)

2006 (gold) 1st 420 Junior Europeans (age 15)

2005 (gold) New Zealand Champion in Starling (age 14)

2005 (gold) New Zealand Champion in 420 (age 14)

2005 (gold) New Zealand Champion in Elliot 5.9 (helm)(age 14)

2004 (silver) 2nd NZ P class Nationals (age 13)

2003 (gold) 1st NZ Optimist Nationals (age 12)

2002 (silver) 2nd NZ Optimist Nationals (age 11)

Olympic Games
Preceded by Nick Willis	Flagbearer for New Zealand; Rio de Janeiro 2016	Succeeded by Sarah Hirini & Hamish Bond
Awards
Preceded by All Blacks	Halberg Awards – New Zealand Team of the Year; 2016; With: Blair Tuke	Succeeded by Team New Zealand
Preceded by Silver Ferns	Lonsdale Cup; 2020; With: Blair Tuke	Succeeded by Lisa Carrington
