= Ryan Seaton (sailor) =

Irish sailor

Personal information
- Born: December 3, 1987 (age 37); Belfast, Northern Ireland

Sport
- Sport: Sailing

Ryan Seaton (born 3 December 1987 in Belfast, Northern Ireland) is an Irish sailor. He represented Ireland at the 2012 Summer Olympics in the 49er class alongside Matt McGovern, the pair finished 14th. He also competed at the 2016 Summer Olympics where he and Matt McGowan finished 10th .
