= Pietro Zucchetti =

Italian sailor

Pietro Zucchetti (born 25 January 1981 in Brescia) is an Italian sailor. He competed in the 470 class with Gabrio Zandona at the 2012 Summer Olympics.
