= Matt McGovern =

Irish sailor

Matt McGovern (born 20 September 1984 in Belfast, Northern Ireland) is an Irish sailor. He represented Ireland at the 2012 Summer Olympics in the 49er class alongside Ryan Seaton, the pair finished 14th. He participated in the 2016 Summer Olympics. At the age of 33, he announced his retirement from the sport.
