= Kenji Takahashi (sailor) =

Japanese sailor

Kenji Takahashi (高橋 賢次, Takahashi Kenji, born August 21, 1982) is a Japanese sailor. He competed at the 2012 Summer Olympics in the 49er class.
