= Nikolaus Resch =

Austrian sailor

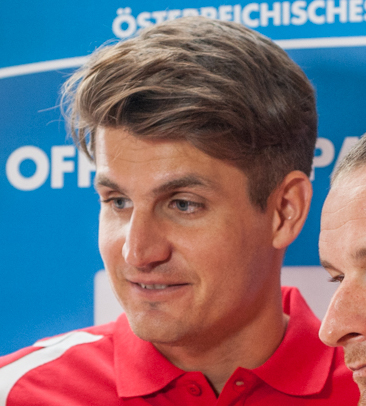
Resch in 2016

Nikolaus Resch is an Austrian sailor. At the 2004 Summer Olympics, he and team-mate, Nico Delle-Karth, competed in the mixed Skiff 49er event, finishing in 10th place. They competed at together again at the 2008 Summer Olympics, finishing in 8th place. At the 2012 Summer Olympics in the 49er class, the pairing finished in 4th place.
