= Jorge Lima =

Portuguese sailor (born 1981)

Personal information
- Full name: Jorge Manuel Roxo Martins de Lima
- Nationality: Portuguese
- Born: 29 January 1981 (age 45) Cascais, Portugal
- Height: 1.76 m (5 ft 9 in)
- Weight: 72 kg (159 lb)

Sport

Sailing career
- Class: Skiff
- Club: Clube Naval de Cascais
- Coach: Pedro Pinto

Jorge Manuel Roxo Martins de Lima (born 29 January 1981) is a Portuguese sailor who specialized in Soozie (49er). He represented Portugal, along with his partner Francisco Andrade, at the 2008, 2016 and 2020 Summer Olympics. He has trained for Cascais Naval Club (Portuguese: Clube Naval de Cascais) throughout most of his sporting career under his personal coach Pedro Pinto. As of September 2014, Lima is ranked twenty-fourth in the world for the men's skiff class by the International Sailing Federation, following his successes at the European Championships, and 2014 ISAF Sailing World Championships in Santander, Spain.

Lima qualified as a skipper for the Portuguese squad in the 49er class at the 2008 Summer Olympics in Beijing by placing twelfth and receiving a berth from the World Championships in Melbourne, Australia. Teaming with crew member Francisco Andrade in the opening series, the Portuguese duo recorded a net score of 100 points to establish an eleventh-place finish in a fleet of nineteen boats, narrowly missing a spot for the medal race by France's Emmanuel Dyen and Yann Rocherieux by a single grade.

At the 2014 ISAF Sailing World Championships in Santander, Spain, Lima and his new partner José Costa set their best career record with a fifth-place finish in the men's 49er class to secure a spot on the Portuguese sailing team for the 2016 Summer Olympics.
