= Emmanuel Dyen =

French sailor

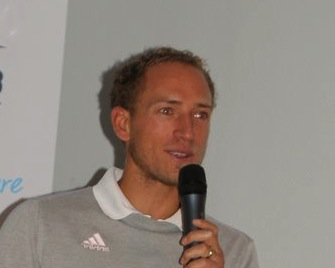
- Dyen in 2009

Personal information
- Nickname: Manu
- Born: 29 June 1979 (age 47) Aix-les-Bains, France
- Height: 180 cm (5 ft 11 in) (2012)
- Weight: 70 kg (154 lb) (2012)

Sailing career
- Sport: Sailing
- Class: 49er
Medal record
World Championship
| Bronze medal – third place | 2013 Marseille | 49er, Men |
European Championship
| Silver medal – second place | 2010 Sopot | 49er, Open |

Emmanuel Dyen (born 29 June 1979) is a French sailor. He competed at the 2008 and 2012 Summer Olympics in the 49er class.

At the 2012 Olympics, Dyen and teammate Stéphane Christidis, finished in 6th place in the men's 49er class.
