= Iain Jensen =

Australian sailor

Personal information
- Full name: Iain Valjean Jensen
- Born: 23 May 1988 (age 38) Belmont, New South Wales, Australia
- Height: 186 cm (6 ft 1 in)
- Weight: 80 kg (176 lb)

Sailing career
- Sport: Sailing
- Class: 49er
Medal record
Sailing
Representing Australia
Olympic Games
Gold medal – first place	2012 London	49er
Silver medal – second place	2016 Rio de Janeiro	49er
World Championships
Gold medal – first place	2009 Riva del Garda	49er
Gold medal – first place	2011 Perth	49er
Gold medal – first place	2012 Zadar	49er
Silver medal – second place	2010 Casa de Campo	Farr 40
Silver medal – second place	2010 Freeport	49er
Bronze medal – third place	2009 Riva del Garda	29er
Bronze medal – third place	2012 Chicago	Farr 40
Bronze medal – third place	2014 Santander	49er
Bronze medal – third place	2017 Malcesine	Moth

Iain Valjean Jensen OAM (born 23 May 1988 in Belmont, New South Wales) is an Australian sailor. He was inducted into the Australian Sailing Hall of Fame in 2025.

He started sailing in his hometown of Wangi Wangi when he was five years old, with his Olympic and Artemis Racing teammate Nathan Outteridge.

With Outteridge, he won the 2009 and 2011 49er World Championships and gold at the 2012 Summer Olympics in the 49ers class. The team also won silver at the 2016 Summer Olympics.

He is a member of the NSW Institute of Sport in Sydney and a wing trimmer for Artemis Racing. He lives in Lake Macquarie.

== Career highlights ==
- 2011 Sailing World Cup Medemblik, Netherlands – 2nd in 49er
- 2011 Sailing World Cup Weymouth Great Britain – 1st in 49er
- 2011 European Championships Helsinki Finland – 1st in 49er
- 2011 Olympic Test Event Weymouth Great Britain – 1st in 49er
- 2011 World Championships Perth Australia – 1st in 49er
- 2012 Sail for Gold Regatta Weymouth Great Britain – 1st in 49er
- 2012 Olympic Games London Great Britain – 1st in 49er
- 2017 Moth Sailing World Championships Malcesine Italy – 3rd in Moth class
