= Sébastien Schneiter =

Swiss sailor

Sébastien Schneiter (born 24 September 1995) is a Swiss sailor. He and Lucien Cujean placed 13th in the 49er event at the 2016 Summer Olympics.

He is the son of the oil businessman Alex Schneiter.
