= Dylan Fletcher =

British sailor

Dylan Fletcher-Scott MBE
Personal information
- Full name: Dylan James Fletcher-Scott
- Nationality: British
- Born: 3 April 1988 (age 38) London, England

Sailing career
- Sport: Sailing
- Class: 405, 29er 49er
Medal record
Men's sailing
Representing Great Britain
Olympic Games
Gold medal – first place	2020 Tokyo	49er
World Championships
Gold medal – first place	2017 Matosinhos	49er
Bronze medal – third place	2016 Clearwater	49er
Bronze medal – third place	2019 Auckland	49er

Dylan James Fletcher-Scott (born 3 April 1988) is a British sailor and Olympic champion in Men's 49er in Tokyo 2020. Fletcher and Alain Sign placed sixth in the 49er event at the 2016 Summer Olympics.

Starting sailing at age 11 and racing at 13, Fletcher has always sailed double handers. Quickly finding himself at the front of the 405 fleet he moved up into the 29er enjoying similar success including 29er under 19 world champion in 2006 (Weymouth, 2nd in seniors). He then transitioned into the 49er climbing up the ranks collecting medals along the way.

Fletcher now sails with Olympic 2012 470 Silver medalist Stuart Bithell. The team medalled at every regatta in 2017 winning both the European and World Championships. They have qualified to represent Great Britain at the 2020 Summer Olympics in the Men's 49er class.

Fletcher won Olympic gold representing Great Britain at the 2020 Summer Olympics in the Men's 49er class with crew Stuart Bithell.

Fletcher was appointed Member of the Order of the British Empire (MBE) in the 2022 New Year Honours for services to sailing.

Fletcher added to his 2 previous world championship titles with Gold at the Moth Worlds in Buenos Aires in 2022.

He is a helm for the British Americas Cup team INEOS Britannia which in the 2024 edition became the first British team since 1964 to compete for the cup by beating Luna Rossa Prada Pirelli in the Louis Vuitton Cup.
