= Marco Grael =

Brazilian sailor (born 1989)

Personal information
- Full name: Marco Soffiatti Grael
- Born: 9 June 1989 (age 37) Niterói, Rio de Janeiro, Brazil
- Height: 181 cm (5 ft 11 in)
- Weight: 82 kg (181 lb)

Sailing career
- Sport: Sailing
- Club: Rio Yacht Club
- Class(es): 49er, ILCA 7, Star
Medal record
Men's sailing
Representing Brazil
Pan American Games
Gold medal – first place	2019 Lima	49er

Marco Soffiatti Grael (Note: This name uses Portuguese naming customs: the first or maternal family name is Soffiatti and the second or paternal family name is Grael.) (born 9 June 1989) is a Brazilian sailor. He competes in the 49er class alongside Gabriel Borges, finishing 11th at the 2016 Summer Olympics, 16th in the 2020 Summer Olympics, and 19th in the 2024 Summer Olympics. Both also won the gold at the 2019 Pan American Games. He is the son of Olympic champion Torben Grael, and brother of Martine Grael.
