= Yannick Lefèbvre =

Belgian sailor

Yannick Lefèbvre (born 19 November 1988) is a Belgian sailor. He and Tom Pelsmaekers placed 17th in the 49er event at the 2016 Summer Olympics.
