= Erik Heil =

German sailor

Personal information
- Nationality: German
- Born: 10 August 1989 (age 36) Berlin, Germany
- Height: 185 cm (6 ft 1 in)
- Weight: 80 kg (176 lb)

Sailing career
- Sport: Sailing
- Club: Norddeutscher Regatta Verein
- Class: 49er
Medal record
Men's sailing
Representing Germany
Olympic Games
Bronze medal – third place	2016 Rio de Janeiro	49er
Bronze medal – third place	2020 Tokyo	49er

Erik Heil (born 10 August 1989) is a German sailor. He competes in the 49er and won a place in the Qualification for the 2016 Summer Olympics together with Thomas Plößel. They won bronze medals at the 2016 Summer Olympics and the 2020 Summer Olympics.

Starting in the fourth season of the SailGP in 2023 he is leading the Germany SailGP Team sponsored by Sebastian Vettel.
