= Alain Sign =

British sailor

Personal information
- Born: 3 February 1986 (age 40) Lee-on-the-Solent, Hampshire, England
- Height: 181 cm (5 ft 11 in)
- Weight: 84 kg (185 lb)

Sailing career
- Sport: Sailing
- Class(es): 49er, 29er, Formula 18, Topper
Medal record
Men's sailing
Representing Great Britain
World Championships
Gold medal – first place	2004 Lake Silvaplana	29er
Bronze medal – third place	2016 Clearwater	49er

Alain Sign (born 3 February 1986) is a British sailor. He and Dylan Fletcher placed sixth in the 49er event at the 2016 Summer Olympics.
