= Nico Delle Karth =

Austrian sailor

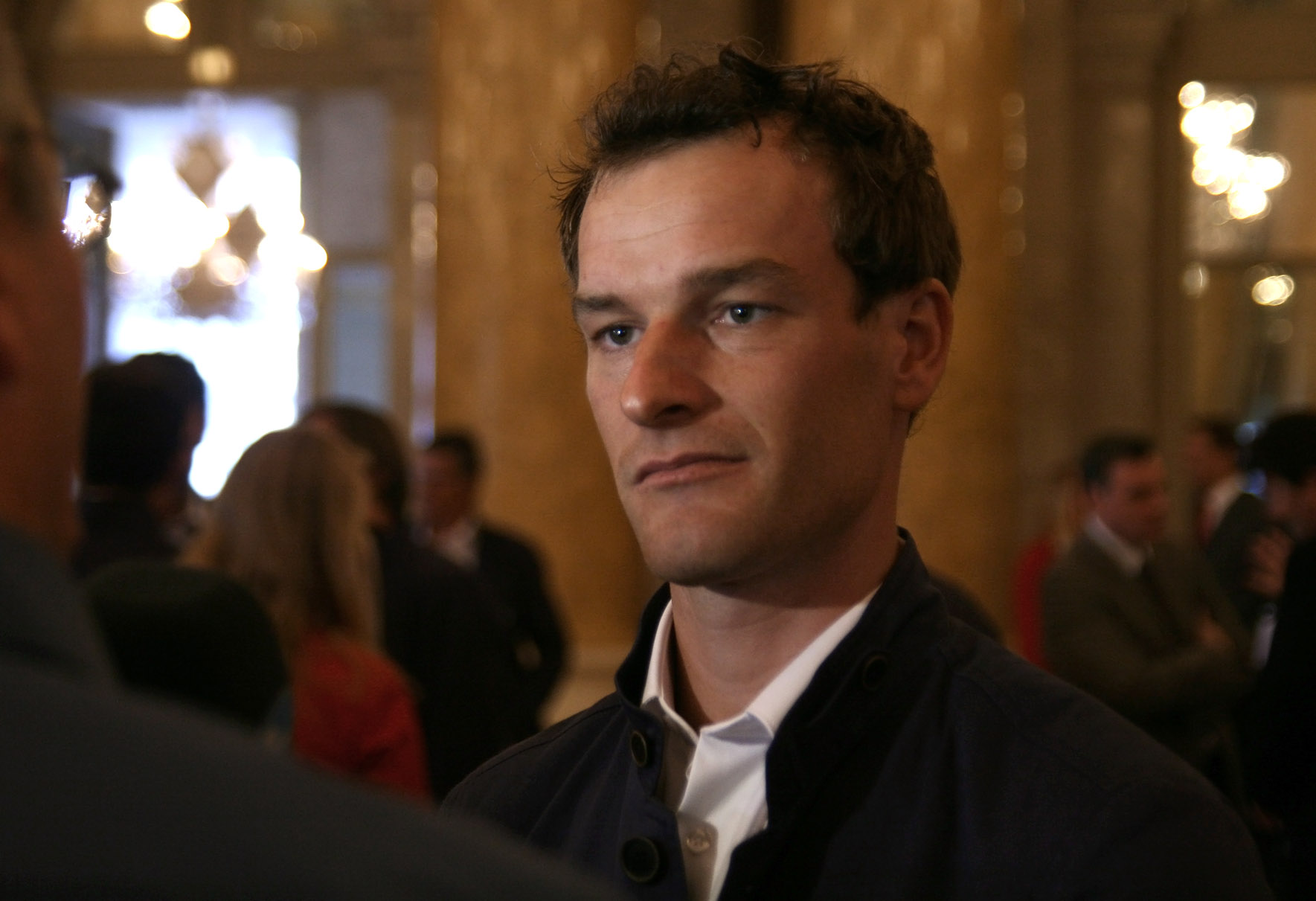

Personal information
- Nationality: Austria
- Born: 24 January 1984 (age 42) Rum, Austria
- Height: 1.80 m (5 ft 11 in)
- Weight: 68 kg (150 lb)

Sailing career
- Sport: Sailing
- Club: Kufsteiner Yachtklub
- Class: Skiff

Nico Luca Marc Delle Karth (born 24 January 1984 in Rum) is an Austrian sailor. He competed at the 2004, 2008 and 2012 Summer Olympics in the 49er class. He is the son of Werner Delle Karth, a world championship medallist in bobsleigh and a Winter Olympian.
