= Łukasz Przybytek =

Polish sailor

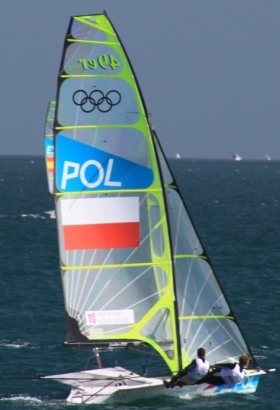

Personal information
- Born: 20 May 1989 (age 37) Lipno
- Height: 178 cm (5 ft 10 in)
- Weight: 73 kg (161 lb)

Sailing career
- Sport: Sailing

Łukasz Przybytek (born 20 May 1989 in Lipno) is a Polish sailor. He competed with Pawel Kolodzinski in the 49er class at the 2012 and 2016 and 2020 Olympics, finishing in 13th and 8th and 9th place respectively.
