= Jonas Warrer =

Danish sailor

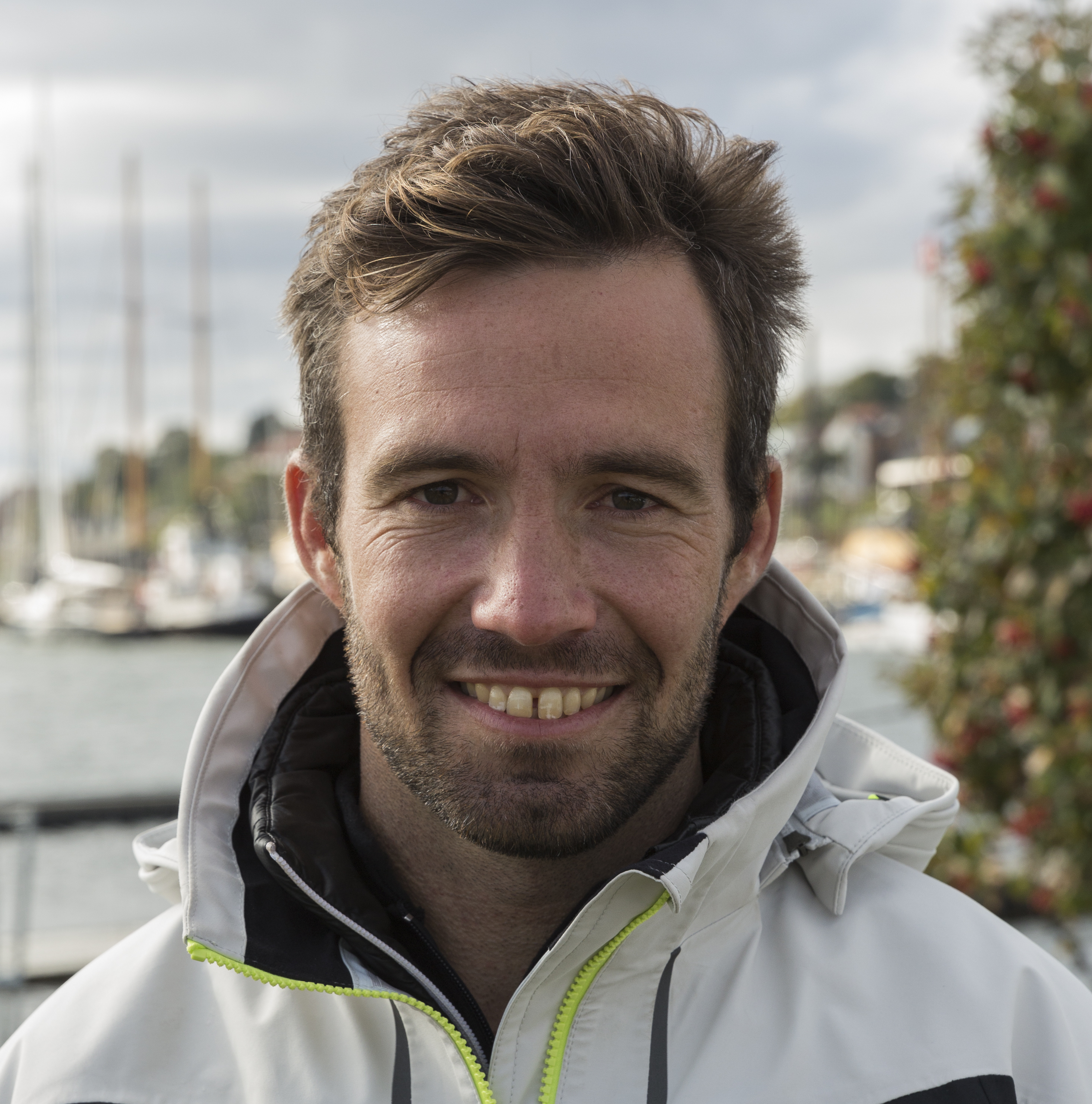
- Warrer in 2016

Personal information
- Born: 22 March 1979 (age 47) Aarhus, Denmark

Sailing career
- Sport: Sailing
Medal record
Men's sailing
Representing Denmark
Olympic Games
Gold medal – first place	2008 Beijing	49er class
World Championships
Silver medal – second place	2014 Santander	49er

Jonas Warrer (born 22 March 1979) is a Danish sailor in the 49er class who sails with Martin Kirketerp. At the 2008 Summer Olympics, they stood to win the gold medal before the final round, but their mast broke shortly before start. The Croatian team lent the Danes their boat, and the Danes went on to finish seventh in the round, which would win them the gold medal.

Olympic Games
Preceded by Caroline Wozniacki	Flagbearer for Denmark (with Sara Petersen); Tokyo 2020	Succeeded by Incumbent
