= Paweł Kołodziński =

Polish sailor

Paweł Kołodziński (born 7 January 1988 in Gdańsk) is a Polish sailor. He competed at the 2012 Summer Olympics in the 49er class finishing in 13th place.
