= 49er & 49er FX World Championships =

International sailing regattas

The 49er World Championships are international sailing regattas in the 49er and 49er FX classes organized by the class association and recognised by World Sailing. The 49er Worlds were first held in 1997 with the class making its Olympic debut at the 2000 Games with the class being used as an open or male event. In 2013 the 49erFX held it first world championship with the class being used for the female discipline since 2016 Games.

== Editions ==
Host cities of the 49er & 49er FX World Championships
Host cities of the 49er & 49er FX World Championships (European cities)

Edition			Host			Gender	Boats	Sailors			Ref
No.	Date	Year	Host club	Location	Nat.	Gender	Boats	No.	Nats	Cont.	Ref
1	7–12 December	1997		Perth	Australia	Open					
2	18–24 May	1998		Bandol	France	Open					
3	8–17 January	1999		Melbourne	Australia	Open	94	188	29	6	
4	14–24 March	2000		Guaymas	Mexico	Open					
5	9-14 Sep	2001	Fraglia Vela Malcesine	Malcesine, Lake Garda	Italy	Open	155	310	26	5	
6	14–22 June	2002	Kaneohe Yacht Club	Kaneohe Bay, Hawaii	United States	Open					
7	11–24 September	2003		Cádiz	Spain	Open	86	172	31	5	
8	14-19 Apr	2004	Nautica Club Katikon Vouliagmenis	Vouliagmeni Bay, Athens	Greece	Open	82	164	28	5	
9	25Aug -6Sep	2005	Moscow Sailing School	Moscow	Russia	Open	65	130	21	4	
10	4-11 Jun	2006	Club Nautique Voile d'Aix les Bains	Aix-les-Bains	France	Open	92	184	24	5	
11	28 June – 13 July	2007	Clube Naval de Cascais	Cascais	Portugal	Open	79	158	31	6	
12	2–9 January	2008	Sorrento Sailing Couta Boat Club	Sorrento, Victoria	Australia	Open	80	160	30	6	
13	12-19 Jul	2009	Fraglia Vela Riva	Riva del Garda	Italy	Open	89	178	23	5	
14	2–9 January	2010		Freeport	Bahamas	Open					
15	3–18 December	2011		Perth	Australia	Open					
16	4-13 May	2012	JK Uskok	Zadar	Croatia	Open	74	148	32	5	
17	21-29 Sep	2013	Yachting Club Pointe Rouge	Marseille	France	Male					
1	21-29 Sep	2013	Yachting Club Pointe Rouge	Marseille	France	Female - FX					
18	12–21 September	2014		Santander	Spain	Male					
2	12–21 September	2014		Santander	Spain	Female - FX	55	110	26	5	
19	13-21 Nov	2015	Club Náutico San Isidro	San Isidro, Buenos Aires	Argentina	Male					
3	13-21 Nov	2015	Club Náutico San Isidro	San Isidro, Buenos Aires	Argentina	Female - FX	44	88	24	5	
20	7-14 Feb	2016	Clearwater Community Sailing Centre	Clearwater, Florida	United States	Male	68	136	25	5	
4	7-14 Feb	2016	Clearwater Community Sailing Centre	Clearwater, Florida	United States	Female - FX	42	84	22	5	
21	28Aug -2Sep	2017	Clube de Vela Atlantico	Leça da Palmeira – Porto	Portugal	Male	81	162	27	5	
5	28Aug -2Sep	2017	Clube de Vela Atlantico	Leça da Palmeira – Porto	Portugal	Female - FX	56	112	25	5	
22	30 July – 12 August	2018		Aarhus	Denmark	Male	86	172	31	5	
6	30 July – 12 August	2018		Aarhus	Denmark	Female - FX	60	120	25	5	
23	3–8 December	2019		Auckland	New Zealand	Male	88	176	31	6	
7	3–8 December	2019		Auckland	New Zealand	Female / FX	61	122	27	5	
24	8-15 Feb	2020	Royal Geelong Yacht Club	Geelong, Victoria	Australia	Male	78	156	27	6	
8	8-15 Feb	2020	Royal Geelong Yacht Club	Geelong, Victoria	Australia	Female - FX	44	88	23	5	
25	16-21 Nov	2021	Al-Mussanah Sports City	Wudam Al Sahil	Oman	Male	36	72	21	5	
9	16-21 Nov	2021	Al-Mussanah Sports City	Wudam Al Sahil	Oman	Female - FX	22	44	17	4	
26	31Aug -5Sep	2022	Hubbards Sailing Club	St. Margarets Bay, Nova Scotia	Canada	Male	65	130	23	5	
10	31Aug -5Sep	2022	Hubbards Sailing Club	St. Margarets Bay, Nova Scotia	Canada	Female - FX	36	72	19	5	
27	11-18 Aug	2023		The Hague	Netherlands	Male	83	166	35	5	
11	11-18 Aug	2023		The Hague	Netherlands	Female - FX	58	116	29	5	
28	5–10 Mar	2024	Real Federación Canaria de Vela	Marina Rubicón, Lanzarote	Spain	Male	71	142	27	5	
12	5–10 Mar	2024	Real Federación Canaria de Vela	Marina Rubicón, Lanzarote	Spain	Female - FX	51	102	25	5	
29	7–12 Oct	2025	Italian Sailing Federation	Marina Piccola, Cagliari	Italy	Male	84	168	29	5	
13	7–12 Oct	2025	Italian Sailing Federation	Marina Piccola, Cagliari	Italy	Female - FX	52	104	20	4	
30	12–17 May	2026	Comité Départemental de Voile du Morbihan	ENVSN, Saint-Pierre-Quiberon	France	Male	82	164	29	4	
14	12–17 May	2026	Comité Départemental de Voile du Morbihan	ENVSN, Saint-Pierre-Quiberon	France	Female - FX	52	104	23	4	

== All-time medal table ==
=== 49er ===
As of 2026

Rank	Nation	Gold	Silver	Bronze	Total
1	Australia (AUS)	7	3	2	12
2	New Zealand (NZL)	7	3	0	10
3	Spain (ESP)	5	3	3	11
4	Great Britain (GBR)	4	7	4	15
5	Netherlands (NED)	2	2	1	5
6	France (FRA)	2	1	1	4
7	United States (USA)	1	1	3	5
8	Ukraine (UKR)	1	0	3	4
9	Croatia (CRO)	1	0	1	2
10	Germany (GER)	0	3	3	6
11	Austria (AUT)	0	3	1	4
12	Denmark (DEN)	0	1	4	5
13	Greece (GRE)	0	1	0	1
13	Norway (NOR)	0	1	0	1
13	Switzerland (SUI)	0	1	0	1
16	Italy (ITA)	0	0	3	3
17	Finland (FIN)	0	0	1	1
Totals (17 entries)		30	30	30	90

=== 49er FX ===
As of 2026

Rank	Nation	Gold	Silver	Bronze	Total
1	Netherlands (NED)	5	1	0	6
2	Spain (ESP)	3	1	1	5
3	Brazil (BRA)	1	4	1	6
4	Sweden (SWE)	1	3	0	4
5	Denmark (DEN)	1	2	2	5
6	Norway (NOR)	1	1	0	2
7	Italy (ITA)	1	0	2	3
8	New Zealand (NZL)	1	0	1	2
9	Great Britain (GBR)	0	1	1	2
10	Austria (AUT)	0	1	0	1
11	Australia (AUS)	0	0	1	1
11	Canada (CAN)	0	0	1	1
11	France (FRA)	0	0	1	1
11	Germany (GER)	0	0	1	1
11	Poland (POL)	0	0	1	1
11	United States (USA)	0	0	1	1
Totals (16 entries)		14	14	14	42

== Medalists ==
=== 49er Open ===
Year	Gold	Silver	Bronze
1997 Perth	Australia; Chris Nicholson; Daniel Phillips	United States; Jonathan McKee; Charles McKee	United States; Morgan Larson; Kevin Hall
1998 Bandol	Australia; Chris Nicholson; Daniel Phillips	Great Britain; Andy Budgen; Ian Budgen	United States; Morgan Larson; Kevin Hall
1999 Melbourne	Australia; Chris Nicholson; Ed Smyth	Australia; Adam Beashel; Teague Czislowski	United States; Morgan Larson; Kevin Hall
2000 Sonora Bay	Spain; Santiago López-Vázquez; Javier de la Plaza	Germany; Marcus Baur; Philip Barth	Finland; Thomas Johanson; Jyrki Järvi
2001 Malcesine	United States; Jonathan McKee; Charles McKee	Spain; Iker Martínez; Xabier Fernández	Ukraine; Rodion Luka; George Leonchuk
2002 Kaneohe Bay	Spain; Iker Martínez; Xabier Fernández	Great Britain; Christopher Draper; Simon Hiscocks	Great Britain; Paul Brotherton; Mark Asquith
2003 Cádiz	Great Britain; Christopher Draper; Simon Hiscocks	Norway; Christoffer Sundby; Frode Bovim	Ukraine; Rodion Luka; George Leonchuk
2004 Athens	Spain; Iker Martínez; Xabier Fernández	Great Britain; Christopher Draper; Simon Hiscocks	Germany; Marcus Baur; Max Groy
2005 Moscow	Ukraine; Rodion Luka; George Leonchuk	Great Britain; Christopher Draper; Simon Hiscocks	Italy; Pietro Sibello; Gianfranco Sibello
2006 Aix-le-Bain	Great Britain; Christopher Draper; Simon Hiscocks	Greece; Thanasis Pakhoumas; Athanasios Siouzios	Great Britain; Stevie Morrison; Ben Rhodes
2007 Cascais	Great Britain; Stevie Morrison; Ben Rhodes	Austria; Nico Delle Karth; Nikolaus Resch	Australia; Nathan Outteridge; Ben Austin
2008 Melbourne	Australia; Nathan Outteridge; Ben Austin	Great Britain; Stevie Morrison; Ben Rhodes	Ukraine; Rodion Luka; George Leonchuk
2009 Riva del Garda	Australia; Nathan Outteridge; Iain Jensen	Great Britain; John Pink; Rick Peacock	Italy; Pietro Sibello; Gianfranco Sibello
2010 Port Lucaya	Spain; Iker Martínez; Xabier Fernández	Australia; Nathan Outteridge; Iain Jensen	Italy; Pietro Sibello; Gianfranco Sibello
2011 Perth	Australia; Nathan Outteridge; Iain Jensen	New Zealand; Peter Burling; Blair Tuke	Denmark; Emil Toft Nielsen; Simon Toft Nielsen
2012 Zadar	Australia; Nathan Outteridge; Iain Jensen	New Zealand; Peter Burling; Blair Tuke	Denmark; Allan Nørregaard; Peter Lang

=== 49er Men's ===
Year	Gold	Silver	Bronze
2013 Marseille	New Zealand; Peter Burling; Blair Tuke	New Zealand; Marcus Hansen; Josh Porebski	France; Emmanuel Dyen; Stéphane Christidis
2014 Santander	New Zealand; Peter Burling; Blair Tuke	Denmark; Jonas Warrer; Anders Thomsen	Australia; Nathan Outteridge; Iain Jensen
2015 Buenos Aires	New Zealand; Peter Burling; Blair Tuke	Australia; Nathan Outteridge; Iain Jensen	Spain; Federico Alonso; Arturo Alonso
2016 Clearwater	New Zealand; Peter Burling; Blair Tuke	Austria; Nico Delle Karth; Nikolaus Resch	Great Britain; Dylan Fletcher-Scott; Alain Sign
2017 Matosinhos	Great Britain; Dylan Fletcher-Scott; Stuart Bithell	Great Britain; James Peters; Fynn Sterritt	Austria; Benjamin Bildstein; David Hussl
2018 Aarhus	Croatia; Šime Fantela; Mihovil Fantela	France; Mathieu Frei; Noé Delpech	Germany; Tim Fischer; Fabian Graf
2019 Auckland	New Zealand; Peter Burling; Blair Tuke	Germany; Erik Heil; Thomas Plössel	Great Britain; Dylan Fletcher-Scott; Stuart Bithell
2020 Geelong	New Zealand; Peter Burling; Blair Tuke	Spain; Diego Botín; Iago López	Germany; Erik Heil; Thomas Plößel
2021 Wudam Al Sahil	Netherlands; Bart Lambriex; Floris van de Werken	Germany; Tim Fischer; Fabian Graf	Denmark; Frederik Rask; Jakob Precht Jensen
2022 St. Margarets Bay	Netherlands; Bart Lambriex; Floris van de Werken	Spain; Diego Botín; Florián Trittel	Croatia; Šime Fantela; Mihovil Fantela
2023 The Hague	Netherlands; Bart Lambriex; Floris van de Werken	Switzerland; Sébastien Schneiter; Arno de Planta	Spain; Diego Botín; Florián Trittel
2024 Lanzarote	France; Erwan Fischer; Clément Pequin	Netherlands; Bart Lambriex; Floris van de Werken	Spain; Diego Botín; Florián Trittel
2025 Cagliari	Spain; Diego Botín; Florián Trittel	Netherlands; Bart Lambriex; Floris van de Werken	Denmark; Jonas Warrer; Mathias Lehm Sletten
2026 Quiberon	New Zealand; Seb Menzies; George Lee Rush	Austria; Keanu Prettner; Jakob Flachberger	Netherlands; Bart Lambriex; Floris van de Werken

=== 49er FX Women's ===
Year	Gold	Silver	Bronze
2013 Marseille	New Zealand; Alex Maloney; Molly Meech	Brazil; Martine Grael; Kahena Kunze	France; Sarah Steyaert; Julie Bossard
2014 Santander	Brazil; Martine Grael; Kahena Kunze	Denmark; Ida Marie Baad Nielsen; Marie Thusgaard Olsen	Italy; Giulia Conti; Francesca Clapcich
2015 Buenos Aires	Italy; Giulia Conti; Francesca Clapcich	Brazil; Martine Grael; Kahena Kunze	Denmark; Ida Marie Baad Nielsen; Marie Thusgaard Olsen
2016 Clearwater	Spain; Támara Echegoyen; Berta Betanzos	Denmark; Maiken Foght Schütt; Anne-Julie Schütt	Germany; Victoria Jurczok; Anika Lorenz
2017 Matosinhos	Denmark; Jena Hansen; Katja Salskov-Iversen	Brazil; Martine Grael; Kahena Kunze	New Zealand; Alex Maloney; Molly Meech
2018 Aarhus	Netherlands; Annemiek Bekkering; Annette Duetz	Austria; Tanja Frank; Lorena Abicht	Great Britain; Sophie Weguelin; Sophie Ainsworth
2019 Auckland	Netherlands; Annemiek Bekkering; Annette Duetz	Brazil; Martine Grael; Kahena Kunze	Denmark; Ida Marie Baad Nielsen; Marie Thusgaard Olsen
2020 Geelong	Spain; Támara Echegoyen; Paula Barceló	Great Britain; Charlotte Dobson; Saskia Tidey	United States; Stephanie Roble; Maggie Shea
2021 Wudam Al Sahil	Netherlands; Odile van Aanholt; Elise de Ruijter	Norway; Helene Næss; Marie Rønningen	Brazil; Martine Grael; Kahena Kunze
2022 St. Margarets Bay	Netherlands; Odile van Aanholt; Annette Duetz	Sweden; Vilma Bobeck; Rebecca Netzler	Spain; Támara Echegoyen; Paula Barceló
2023 The Hague	Sweden; Vilma Bobeck; Rebecca Netzler	Netherlands; Odile van Aanholt; Annette Duetz	Australia; Olivia Price; Evie Haseldine
2024 Lanzarote	Netherlands; Odile van Aanholt; Annette Duetz	Sweden; Vilma Bobeck; Rebecca Netzler	Italy; Jana Germani; Giorgia Bertuzzi
2025 Cagliari	Spain; Paula Barceló; María Cantero	Sweden; Vilma Bobeck; Ebba Berntsson	Canada; Georgia Lewin-LaFrance; Antonia Lewin-LaFrance
2026 Quiberon	Norway; Pia Dahl Andersen; Nora Edland	Spain; Paula Barceló; María Cantero	Poland; Aleksandra Melzacka; Sandra Jankowiak

== Multiple medallists ==
=== 49er ===
#	Athlete	Gold	Silver	Bronze	Total	
1	Peter Burling (NZL)	6	2	0	8	9
1	Blair Tuke (NZL)	6	2	0	8	9
3	Nathan Outteridge (AUS)	4	2	2	8	8
4	Iain Jensen (AUS)	3	2	1	6	8
4	Bart Lambriex (NED)	3	2	1	6	8
4	Floris Van De Werken (NED)	3	2	1	6	6
7	Iker Martinez De Lizarduy (ESP)	3	1	0	4	10
7	Xabier Fernandez (ESP)	3	1	0	4	8
9	Chris Nicholson (AUS)	3	0	1	4	7
10	Chris Draper (GBR)	2	2	0	4	6
10	Simon Hiscocks (GBR)	2	2	0	4	7
12	Daniel Phillips (AUS)	2	0	1	3	4

=== 49er FX ===
#	Athlete	Gold	Silver	Bronze	Total	
1	Annette Duetz (NED)	4	1	0	5	8
2	Odile van Aanholt (NED)	3	1	0	4	8
3	Paula Barceló (ESP)	2	1	1	4	6
4	Tamara Echegoyen Dominguez (ESP)	2	0	1	3	8
4	Annemiek Bekkering (NED)	2	0	0	2	7

== See also ==
- Sailing World Championships
- World Sailing
