= 2017 49er & 49er FX World Championships =

Event title
- Edition: 21st

Event details
- Venue: Matosinhos, Portugal
- Dates: 28 August – 2 September
- Titles: 2

Competitors
- Competitors: 280
- Competing nations: 27

The 2017 49er & 49er FX World Championships were held in Matosinhos, Portugal 28 August – 2 September 2017. 140 teams from 27 nations competed in the regatta that saw British Dylan Fletcher-Scott and Stuart Bithell as winners of the 49er class and Danish Jena Hansen and Katja Salskov-Iversen as winners of the 49er FX class.

== Results ==
=== 49er ===
Results of individual races
Pos	Crew	Country	I	II	III	IV	V	VI	VII	VIII	IX	X	Tot	Pts
Gold medal	Dylan Fletcher-Scott; Stuart Bithell	Great Britain	1	5	16	1	1	1	4	4	2	8	43	19
Silver medal	James Peters; Fynn Sterritt	Great Britain	2	2	5	4	2	3	2	16	3	5	44	23
Bronze medal	Benjamin Bildstein; David Hussl	Austria	5	3	4	3	4	11	1	2	6	18	57	28
4	Łukasz Przybytek; Paweł Kołodziński	Poland	9	11	1	2	1	1	8	1	8	20	62	31
5	Justus Schmidt; Max Boehme	Germany	4	3	2	2	6	2	12	3	18	4	56	32
6	Erik Heil; Thomas Plößel	Germany	7	1	2	1	12	3	5	8	5	10	54	32
7	Kévin Fischer; Yann Jauvin	France	3	8	3	3	6	2	3	11	10	7	56	37
8	Diego Botín; Iago López	Spain	1	UFD	2	2	3	5	11	15	14	3	84	41
9	Federico Alonso; Arturo Alonso	Spain	6	11	7	7	1	1	13	6	1	17	70	42
10	Jacopo Plazzi; Andrea Tesei	Italy	7	14	7	4	2	4	7	10	11	1	67	42
11	Yago Lange; Klaus Lange	Argentina	5	1	5	4	5	2	6	17	13	11	69	47
12	Jorge Lima; José Costa	Portugal	1	2	13	3	3	5	10	20	9	14	80	47
13	Sébastien Schneiter; Lucien Cujean	Switzerland	13	10	6	5	6	9	18	14	4	6	91	60
14	David Gilmour; Joel Turner	Australia	14	9	7	7	2	4	14	9	16	9	91	61
15	Carl P. Sylvan; Marcus Anjemark	Sweden	10	16	8	6	10	3	16	7	17	2	95	62
16	Fritiof Hedström; Otto Hamel	Sweden	19	4	11	10	7	5	9	12	7	12	96	65
17	Nils Carstensen; Jan Frigge	Germany	14	8	4	8	7	7	20	5	12	19	104	70
18	Josh Porebski; Trent Rippey	New Zealand	8	3	4	12	5	10	17	19	DNF	15	114	81
19	Jakob Meggendorfer; Andreas Spranger	Germany	14	9	3	5	10	11	19	13	19	13	116	83
20	Carlos Robles; Marco Grael	Brazil	5	UFD	6	6	7	13	15	18	15	16	129	83
21	William Phillips; Sam Phillips	Australia	13	7	3	9	9	15	2	17	3	1	79	47
22	Dominik Buksak; Szymon Wierzbicki	Poland	2	21	1	15	21	6	25	4	1	4	100	54
23	Tim Fischer; Fabian Graf	Germany	20	1	1	17	14	6	7	2	16	14	98	62
24	Jack Hawkins; Chris Thomas	Great Britain	17	17	13	6	4	8	24	10	6	2	107	66
25	Uberto Crivelli Visconti; Gianmarco Togni	Italy	9	12	9	RDG	15	6	15	12	2	6	96.2	66.2
26	Šime Fantela; Mihovil Fantela	Croatia	4	6	5	23	15	19	1	6	11	UFD	122	67
27	Yannick Lefèbvre; Tom Pelsmaekers	Belgium	3	19	10	1	20	13	3	15	7	13	104	69
28	Isaac McHardie; William McKenzie	New Zealand	8	4	11	8	14	10	5	11	20	DNC	123	77
29	Judge Ryan; Hans Henken	United States	15	12	14	10	11	11	UFD	3	12	5	125	78
30	Ryan Seaton; Nikolaus Resch	Ireland	16	13	10	5	3	9	18	19	4	23	120	81
31	Lachy Gilmour; Ryan Donaldson	Australia	11	18	17	13	5	8	28	8	14	7	129	83
32	Hannes Westberg; Albin Boman	Sweden	16	12	6	20	14	4	4	1	BFD	UFD	141	89
33	Henry Lloyd Williams; Will Alloway	Great Britain	21	17	12	13	9	9	14	18	5	15	133	94
34	Chris Taylor; Sam Batten	Great Britain	12	14	15	14	8	24	11	13	8	12	131	94
35	Przemek Filipowicz; Jacek Nowak	Poland	7	UFD	12	22	9	7	17	9	19	11	141	94
36	Dante Bianchi; Thomas Low-Beer	Brazil	6	21	22	12	8	14	13	25	10	10	141	94
37	Gabriel Skoczek; Aubriot Virgil	France	3	16	19	11	4	17	27	28	9	8	142	95
38	Lucas Rual; Émile Amoros	France	11	6	UFD	11	8	16	8	BFD	18	20	158	98
39	Scipio Houtman; Pim van Vugt	Netherlands	23	15	17	8	12	12	22	20	15	3	147	102
40	Robert Scheidt; Gabriel Borges	Brazil	8	24	9	14	17	10	26	5	13	DNF	158	102
41	Joakim Salskov-Iversen; Markus Oliver Nielsen	Denmark	25	5	22	9	10	21	12	7	21	16	148	102
42	Lars van Stekelenborg; Robin Becker	Netherlands	19	20	8	11	11	17	6	16	BFD	19	159	107
43	Chris Rast; Trevor Burd	United States	9	7	18	DSQ	11	DNF	10	22	26	9	168	114
44	Kurt Hansen; Jim Colley	Australia	18	2	13	DNF	22	12	9	27	23	21	175	120
45	Simone Ferrarese; Valerio Galati	Italy	10	19	19	BFD	13	7	16	24	17	25	178	125
46	Andrew Mollerus; Matthew Mollerus	United States	4	UFD	8	18	13	DNF	23	14	24	18	178	126
47	Hugo Fedrigucci; Sébastien Scotto di Fasano	France	18	10	UFD	17	20	8	21	21	BFD	17	192	132
48	James Grummett; Daniel Budden	Great Britain	21	7	14	19	16	16	20	23	25	24	185	139
49	Frederik Just Melson; Jakob Precht Jensen	Denmark	22	16	11	10	DNF	15	19	BFD	22	DNF	207	147
50	Cas van Dongen; Daniel Bramervear	Netherlands	6	4	22	19	23	25	29	26	BFD	22	208	151
51	Erwan Fischer; Thibault Julien	France	2	5	16	DNF	DNF	13	DNC	DNC	DNC	DNC	220	160
52	Musab Al Hadi; Clement Pequin	Oman	19	24	24	7	12	14	2	2			104	80
53	Matt McGovern; Robert Gilmore	Ireland	26	21	16	DNS	17	14	1	1			124	96
54	Morgan Peach; Rhos Hawes	Great Britain	24	15	12	18	21	DNF	6	5			129	101
55	Victor Silén; Christoffer Silén	Finland	23	15	23	14	19	12	10	10			126	103
56	Alexander Heinzemann; Justin Barnes	Canada	15	19	18	13	18	23	17	4			127	104
57	Nevin Snow; Max Agnese	United States	24	14	UFD	9	16	DNF	11	3			133	105
58	Gwendal Nael; Brewal Nael	France	12	18	18	24	25	16	7	11			131	106
59	Peter Lin Janežič; Sebastian Princic	Slovenia	17	11	20	20	DNF	DNS	4	9			137	109
60	Robert Dickson; Sean Waddilove	Ireland	22	20	20	12	16	22	9	12			133	111
61	Sean Donnelly; Tadgh Donnelly	Ireland	21	6	20	23	15	18	3	DNF			137	114
62	Riccardo Groppi; Stefano Dezulian	Italy	18	9	21	17	DNF	DNF	16	15			152	124
63	Mark Hassett; Oisin O'Driscoll	Ireland	26	23	23	16	24	19	14	6			151	125
64	Klaes Meier-Andersen; Carl Emil Nielsen	Denmark	23	22	26	18	13	15	5	DNF			153	127
65	Oliver Aldridge; Jamie Jobson	Great Britain	27	23	21	16	22	21	18	8			156	129
66	Michael Hansen; Mathias Sletten	Denmark	17	20	19	21	19	20	8	DNF			155	134
67	Rodolfo Pires; Gonçalo Pires	Portugal	20	25	9	15	DNF	DNF	DSQ	7			163	135
68	Yannis Naudy; Martin Guez	France	15	10	15	19	17	17	DSQ	DNF			155	136
69	William Jones; Evan DePaul	Canada	27	27	25	21	18	22	15	13			168	141
70	Edoardo Campoli; Lorenzo Cianchi	Italy	10	18	15	DNF	DNF	DNF	12	DNF			170	142
71	Kim Sung-wok; Yang Ho-yeob	South Korea	12	8	10	DNF	DNF	DNF	DNF	DNF			176	148
72	Gillies Munro; Daniel Harris	Great Britain	25	13	17	16	DNF	DNF	19	DNF			177	149
73	Cian Byrne; Patrick Crosbie	Ireland	24	26	25	15	18	DNF	DNF	14			181	153
74	Shingen Furuya; Shinji Hachiyama	Japan	11	17	27	21	DNF	DNF	20	DNF			183	155
75	Juuso Roihu; Henri Roihu	Estonia	25	22	DSQ	BFD	23	18	13	UFD			188	160
76	Francisco Maia; Afonso Maia	Portugal	13	22	23	DNF	DNF	DNF	UFD	16			189	161
77	Levi Slap; Joachim D'Hondt	Belgium	22	26	14	DNF	19	20	DNF	DNF			191	163
78	Luis Bugallo; Jorge Lorenzo	Spain	16	13	UFD	22	DNF	DNF	RET	DNF			197	169
79	Tom Walker; Max Todd	Great Britain	26	25	24	DNF	DNF	DNF	21	18			198	170
80	Marco Baumann; Jakob Flachberger	Austria	20	23	21	20	DNF	DNF	DNS	DNF			202	174
81	Lachlan Pearman; Matthew Barker	Great Britain	27	27	26	DNS	DNF	DNS	DSQ	17			212	184

Legend: BFD – Black flag disqualification; DNC – Did not come to the starting area; DNF – Did not finish; DSQ – Disqualified; RDG – Redress given; UFD – "U" flag disqualification;

=== 49er FX ===
Results of individual races
Pos	Crew	Country	I	II	III	IV	V	VI	VII	VIII	IX	X	XI	XII	M1	M2	M3	Tot	Pts
Gold medal	Jena Mai Hansen; Katja Salskov-Iversen	Denmark	1	5	1	6	1	2	11	1	2	1	1	2	1	10	2	47	30
Silver medal	Martine Grael; Kahena Kunze	Brazil	6	1	4	2	4	3	1	3	3	10	3	3	5	2	5	55	39
Bronze medal	Alex Maloney; Molly Meech	New Zealand	3	1	1	2	1	1	2	4	7	11	12	8	2	1	8	64	49
4	Ida Marie Baad Nielsen; Marie Thusgaard Olsen	Denmark	6	3	3	3	5	4	19	15	1	2	9	11	3	9	1	94	69
5	Victoria Jurczok; Anika Lorenz	Germany	3	2	5	4	2	18	4	9	6	6	10	14	7	7	6	103	71
6	Annemiek Bekkering; Jeske Kisters	Netherlands	2	10	4	11	2	2	12	10	9	5	4	6	8	5	7	97	74
7	Támara Echegoyen; Berta Betanzos	Spain	17	7	3	3	11	17	18	2	5	3	7	7	6	4	3	113	78
8	Tina Lutz; Susann Beucke	Germany	16	17	6	8	6	7	5	8	11	8	2	16	4	3	4	121	88
9	Charlotte Dobson; Saskia Tidey	Great Britain	8	11	2	1	16	1	3	14	4	4	16	15	10	6	9	120	88
10	Anne-Julie Schütt; Iben Nielsby	Denmark	16	9	15	1	9	4	10	7	19	16	14	4	9	8	10	151	116
11	Lili Sebesi; Albane Dubois	France	7	22	2	16	3	16	15	6	12	9	20	5				133	91
12	Kate MacGregor; Sophie Ainsworth	Great Britain	4	23	10	6	4	3	9	19	18	14	15	13				138	96
13	Erica Dawson; Kate Stewart	New Zealand	4	26	7	5	5	5	14	13	15	DNF	11	18				160	97
14	Dewi Couvert; Marieke Jongens	Netherlands	19	25	5	10	10	7	7	5	8	DNF	8	20				161	99
15	Helene Næss; Marie Rønningen	Norway	5	8	13	16	7	14	13	11	10	DNF	6	12				152	99
16	Jule Görge; Lotta Görge	Germany	20	7	9	4	14	6	20	12	14	12	17	9				144	104
17	Victoria Travascio; Sol Branz	Argentina	14	9	7	7	3	5	16	17	13	15	13	19				138	105
18	Haylee Outteridge; Nina Curtis	Australia	11	3	14	18	13	10	6	20	16	13	5	17				146	108
19	Vilma Bobeck; Malin Tengström	Sweden	23	15	11	5	11	8	17	18	20	7	19	1				155	112
20	Odile van Aanholt; Nicole van der Velden	Aruba	15	19	6	8	6	9	8	16	17	17	18	10				149	112
21	Julie Bossard; Aude Compan	France	7	11	13	14	DNF	8	2	14	2	8						108	65
22	Erin Rafuse; Danielle Boyd	Canada	22	22	12	9	9	11	3	12	1	2						103	69
23	Tess Lloyd; Eliza Solly	Australia	13	12	10	13	12	6	1	5	13	10						95	69
24	Stephanie Roble; Maggie Shea	United States	14	13	19	9	17	10	4	1	4	3						94	71
25	Judith Engberts; Cecile Janmaat	Netherlands	BFD	19	8	11	8	23	5	DNC	5	5						150	84
26	Chika Hatae; Hiroka Itakura	Japan	UFD	20	16	15	7	13	7	3	7	4						121	85
27	Francesca Bergamo; Jana Germani	Italy	18	26	14	12	12	11	6	11	3	14						127	87
28	Sophie Weguelin; Stephanie Orton	Great Britain	5	16	8	18	20	RDG	12	2	14	15						123.4	88.4
29	Julia Gross; Hanna Klinga	Sweden	20	18	12	7	8	15	19	7	BFD	7						150	93
30	Megan Brickwood; Eleanor Aldridge	Great Britain	23	12	20	23	13	12	8	6	11	6						134	100
31	Caitlin Elks; Hayley Clark	Australia	18	6	17	22	15	17	22	4	12	12						145	101
32	Anna Yamazaki; Sena Takano	Japan	2	4	21	19	16	21	13	DNC	17	9						159	101
33	Kimberly Lim; Cecilia Low	Singapore	9	18	18	17	23	9	14	9	26	18						161	112
34	Tanja Frank; Lorena Abicht	Austria	12	4	18	17	19	22	25	DNC	6	16						176	117
35	Katrine Bendix Krogh; Line Just Emsvang	Denmark	17	10	22	20	26	13	20	8	24	11						171	121
36	Sayoko Harada; Sarah Nagamatsu	Japan	8	14	27	22	15	23	9	10	28	22						178	123
37	Arantza Gumucio; Begoña Gumucio	Chile	10	23	16	23	22	15	10	18	10	17						164	123
38	Kätlin Tammiste; Anna Maria Sepp	Estonia	21	27	21	14	14	19	15	13	8	31						183	125
39	Carla Munte; Marta Munte	Spain	13	14	19	15	17	20	11	19	BFD	19						184	127
40	Natasha Bryant; Annie Wilmot	Australia	15	27	9	19	10	16	DNF	DNS	9	13						192	128
41	Klara Wester; Rebecca Netzler	Sweden	12	8	20	10	24	12	UFD	DNC	BFD	1						198	137
42	Carlotta Omari; Matilda Distefano	Italy	9	2	23	26	21	DNS	21	16	20	27						194	138
43	Laura Schöfegger; Elsa Lovrek	Austria	22	6	15	24	21	22	16	DNC	16	26						205	144
44	Aleksandra Melzacka; Kinga Łoboda	Poland	11	16	22	25	23	20	18	17	21	24						197	148
45	Maria Ottavia Raggio; Alice Sinno	Italy	21	24	26	21	18	UFD	17	15	18	21						210	160
46	Noora Ruskola; Mikaela Wulff	Finland	1	5	24	13	DSQ	14	DNC	DNC	DNS							197	168
47	Griselda Khng; Olivia Chen	Singapore	10	15	25	12	19	25	DNC	DNC	23	30						233	171
48	Livia Naef; Nelia Puhze	Switzerland	24	13	24	26	20	24	23	DNS	19	25						235	172
49	Madeleine Zielinska; Nadia Zielinska	Poland	24	17	26	28	18	19	DNC	DNS	22	29						257	192
50	Sara Piasecka; Sandra Jankowiak	Poland	19	24	23	28	27	DNF	DNF	DNS	15	20						259	193
51	Victoria Payne; Alice Masterman	Great Britain	25	28	27	25	25	21	26	DNC	25	23						262	197
52	Patricia Suárez; María Alonso González-Solla	Spain	DSQ	25	17	21	22	24	24	DNC	DNS							236	207
53	Amelia Stabback; Ella Clark	Australia	26	21	11	20	DNF	DNS	DNC	DNC	DNS							247	218
54	Angelika Kohlendorfer; Lisa Farthofer	Austria	27	20	28	27	DNF	DNF	DNF	DNC	27	28						289	223
55	Kate Shaner; Caroline Atwood	United States	DSQ	21	25	24	24	DNF	DNC	DNC	DNS							263	234
56	Varsha Gautham; Sweta Shervegar	India	25	28	DNF	27	DNF	DNS	DNC	DNC	DNS							278	249

Legend: – Qualified for medal race(s); BFD – Black flag disqualification; DNC – Did not come to the starting area; DNF – Did not finish; DSQ – Disqualified; RDG – Redress given; UFD – "U" flag disqualification;
