= Sailing at the 2004 Summer Olympics – 49er =

Mixed 49er at the Games of the XXVIII Olympiad
- Line drawing of the 49er
- Venue: Agios Kosmas Olympic Sailing Centre
- Dates: First race: 17 August 2004; Last race: 26 August 2004
- Competitors: 38 from 19 nations

Medalists
1st place, gold medalist(s)		Iker Martínez; Xabier Fernández	Spain
2nd place, silver medalist(s)		Rodion Luka; George Leonchuk	Ukraine
3rd place, bronze medalist(s)		Chris Draper; Simon Hiscocks	Great Britain

The Mixed 49er was a sailing event on the Sailing at the 2004 Summer Olympics program in Agios Kosmas Olympic Sailing Centre. sixteen races were scheduled and completed with two discards. 38 sailors, on 19 boats, from 19 nation competed.

== Race schedule ==
●	Practice races	●	Series Race	●	Medal Race	Res = Reserve Day

Date	August																	
Date	12 Thu	13 Fri	14 Sat	15 Sun	16 Mon	17 Tue	18 Wed	19 Thu	20 Fri	21 Sat	22 Sun	23 Mon	24 Tue	25 Wed	26 Thu	27 Fri	28 Sat	29 Sun
Actual	●	●				1	2,3,4	5,6	7,8,9	Res	10,11	12	13 14 16	Res	MR			
Scheduled			PR		S1,2,3	Res	S4,5,6	Res	S7,8,9	Res	S10,11,12	Res	S13,14,15	Res	MR			

== Final results ==
Rank	Country	Helmsman	Crew	Race 1		Race 2		Race 3		Race 4		Race 5		Race 6		Race 7		Race 8		Race 9		Race 10		Race 11		Race 12		Race 13		Race 14		Race 15		Race 16		Total	Total – discard
Rank	Country	Helmsman	Crew	Pos.	Pts.	Pos.	Pts.	Pos.	Pts.	Pos.	Pts.	Pos.	Pts.	Pos.	Pts.	Pos.	Pts.	Pos.	Pts.	Pos.	Pts.	Pos.	Pts.	Pos.	Pts.	Pos.	Pts.	Pos.	Pts.	Pos.	Pts.	Pos.	Pts.	Pos.	Pts.	Total	Total – discard
1st place, gold medalist(s)	Spain	Iker Martínez	Xabier Fernández	3	3.0	11	11.0	7	7.0	5	5.0	1	1.0	~~12~~	~~12.0~~	2	2.0	6	6.0	~~12~~	~~12.0~~	1	1.0	8	8.0	2	2.0	8	8.0	2	2.0	4	4.0	7	7.0	91.0	67.0
2nd place, silver medalist(s)	Ukraine	Rodion Luka	George Leonchuk	4	4.0	~~15~~	~~15.0~~	3	3.0	7	7.0	2	2.0	~~10~~	~~10.0~~	7	7.0	5	5.0	9	9.0	5	5.0	3	3.0	10	10.0	6	6.0	5	5.0	3	3.0	3	3.0	97.0	72.0
3rd place, bronze medalist(s)	Great Britain	Chris Draper	Simon Hiscocks	8	8.0	5	5.0	6	6.0	3	3.0	10	10.0	8	8.0	1	1.0	~~13~~	~~13.0~~	~~11~~	~~11.0~~	8	8.0	2	2.0	4	4.0	1	1.0	9	9.0	6	6.0	6	6.0	101.0	77.0
4	Norway	Christoffer Sundby	Frode Bovim	1	1.0	3	3.0	9	9.0	~~OCS~~	~~20.0~~	6	6.0	4	4.0	13	13.0	8	8.0	~~15~~	~~15.0~~	11	11.0	6	6.0	9	9.0	11	11.0	3	3.0	2	2.0	2	2.0	123.0	88.0
5	United States	Tim Wadlow	Pete Spaulding	7	7.0	8	8.0	5	5.0	~~OCS~~	~~20.0~~	9	9.0	9	9.0	8	8.0	3	3.0	1	1.0	~~13~~	~~13.0~~	7	7.0	3	3.0	10	10.0	11	11.0	1	1.0	10	10.0	125.0	92.0
6	Brazil	André Fonseca	Rodrigo Duarte	2	2.0	4	4.0	~~13~~	~~13.0~~	13	13.0	3	3.0	3	3.0	5	5.0	12	12.0	10	10.0	12	12.0	5	5.0	~~15~~	~~15.0~~	12	12.0	10	10.0	8	8.0	5	5.0	132.0	104.0
7	Australia	Chris Nicholson	Gary Boyd	13	13.0	6	6.0	15	15.0	1	1.0	17	17.0	~~18~~	~~18.0~~	10	10.0	1	1.0	7	7.0	3	3.0	1	1.0	17	17.0	2	2.0	1	1.0	~~OCS~~	~~20.0~~	11	11.0	143.0	105.0
8	Finland	Thomas Johanson	Jukka Piirainen	14	14.0	7	7.0	2	2.0	9	9.0	8	8.0	6	6.0	9	9.0	7	7.0	5	5.0	6	6.0	9	9.0	13	13.0	~~14~~	~~14.0~~	12	12.0	~~15~~	~~15.0~~	4	4.0	140.0	111.0
9	Germany	Marcus Baur	Max Groy	9	9.0	2	2.0	1	1.0	8	8.0	14	14.0	16	16.0	15	15.0	11	11.0	~~16~~	~~16.0~~	2	2.0	12	12.0	6	6.0	5	5.0	14	14.0	~~DNF~~	~~20.0~~	1	1.0	152.0	116.0
10	Austria	Nico Delle Karth	Nikolaus Resch	5	5.0	13	13.0	11	11.0	6	6.0	5	5.0	~~14~~	~~14.0~~	6	6.0	17	17.0	13	13.0	4	4.0	~~15~~	~~15.0~~	8	8.0	13	13.0	4	4.0	12	12.0	8	8.0	154.0	122.0
11	France	Marc Audineau	Stéphane Christidis	6	6.0	10	10.0	14	14.0	11	11.0	~~16~~	~~16.0~~	1	1.0	12	12.0	14	14.0	4	4.0	~~18~~	~~18.0~~	11	11.0	11	11.0	4	4.0	8	8.0	10	10.0	14	14.0	164.0	130.0
12	Switzerland	Chris Rast	Christian Steiger	11	11.0	9	9.0	12	12.0	2	2.0	~~OCS~~	~~20.0~~	7	7.0	16	16.0	16	16.0	3	3.0	10	10.0	10	10.0	~~16~~	~~16.0~~	7	7.0	16	16.0	9	9.0	9	9.0	173.0	137.0
13	Denmark	Michael Hestbæk	Dennis Dengsø Andersen	16	16.0	~~17~~	~~17.0~~	~~17~~	~~17.0~~	10	10.0	7	7.0	11	11.0	3	3.0	15	15.0	6	6.0	7	7.0	17	17.0	1	1.0	15	15.0	6	6.0	11	11.0	13	13.0	172.0	138.0
14	Italy	Pietro Sibello	Gianfranco Sibello	~~DSQ~~	~~20.0~~	1	1.0	4	4.0	12	12.0	11	11.0	~~17~~	~~17.0~~	4	4.0	9	9.0	14	14.0	15	15.0	16	16.0	5	5.0	9	9.0	17	17.0	5	5.0	16	16.0	175.0	138.0
15	Japan	Kenji Nakamura	Masato Takaki	12	12.0	14	14.0	~~19~~	~~19.0~~	~~OCS~~	~~20.0~~	4	4.0	2	2.0	19	19.0	4	4.0	2	2.0	14	14.0	4	4.0	7	7.0	17	17.0	18	18.0	14	14.0	15	15.0	185.0	146.0
16	Ireland	Tom Fitzpatrick	Fraser Brown	10	10.0	16	16.0	10	10.0	4	4.0	12	12.0	5	5.0	~~17~~	~~17.0~~	2	2.0	17	17.0	16	16.0	14	14.0	14	14.0	~~DSQ~~	~~20.0~~	7	7.0	13	13.0	12	12.0	189.0	152.0
17	Greece	Athanasios Pachoumas	Vasileios Portosalte	15	15.0	12	12.0	8	8.0	14	14.0	15	15.0	13	13.0	14	14.0	18	18.0	8	8.0	17	17.0	~~DSQ~~	~~20.0~~	12	12.0	RDG	13.4	15	15.0	7	7.0	~~OCS~~	~~20.0~~	221.4	181.4
18	Poland	Marcin Czajkowski	Krzysztof Kierkowski	~~DSQ~~	~~20.0~~	18	18.0	16	16.0	~~OCS~~	~~20.0~~	13	13.0	15	15.0	11	11.0	10	10.0	18	18.0	9	9.0	13	13.0	18	18.0	3	3.0	13	13.0	16	16.0	17	17.0	230.0	190.0
19	India	Malav Shroff	Sumeet Patel	17	17.0	~~19~~	~~19.0~~	18	18.0	15	15.0	18	18.0	19	19.0	18	18.0	19	19.0	19	19.0	19	19.0	18	18.0	19	19.0	~~DNC~~	~~20.0~~	19	19.0	17	17.0	18	18.0	292.0	253.0

Legend: DNC – Did not come to the starting area; DNF – Did not finish; DSQ – Disqualified; OCS – On the course side of the starting line; RDG – Redress given;
Discard is crossed out and does not count for the overall result.

== Daily standings ==
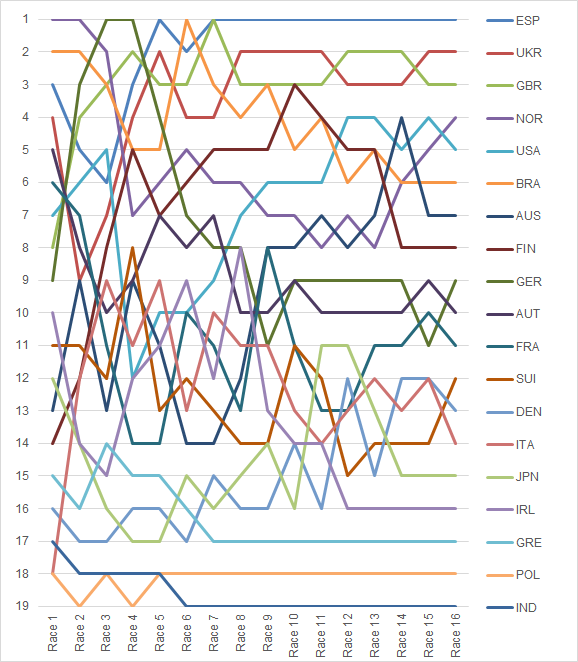
Graph showing the daily standings in the 49er at the 2004 Summer Olympics
