= Sailing at the 2000 Summer Olympics – 49er =

Sailing at the Olympics

49er class at the Games of the XXVII Olympiad
- 49er (dinghy)
- Venue: Darling Point Cruising Yacht Club of Australia, Sydney
- Date: First race: 18 September 2000; Last race: 25 September 2000
- Competitors: 17 Boats; 34 Sailors from 17 nations

Medalists
1st place, gold medalist(s)		Jyrki Järvi; Thomas Johanson	Finland
2nd place, silver medalist(s)		Ian Barker; Simon Hiscocks	Great Britain
3rd place, bronze medalist(s)		Jonathan McKee; Charlie McKee	United States

A 49er class two-handed sailing dinghy competition formed part of the 2000 Summer Olympics in Sydney, Australia. Seventeen crews took part. The gold medal was won by Jyrki Järvi and Thomas Johanson of Finland.

== Results ==
Results of individual races
Position	Nation	Names	Role	1	2	3	4	5	6	7	8	9	10	11	12	13	14	15	16	Total	Net
Gold medal	Finland	Thomas Johanson; Jyrki Jarvi	Helm; Crew	2	7	2	-12	3	4	10	6	2	4	7	2	3	1	2	-13	80	55
Silver medal	Great Britain	Ian Barker; Simon Hiscocks	Helm; Crew	-13	5	6	-10	6	2	4	2	9	5	4	4	5	4	1	3	83	60
Bronze medal	United States	Jonathan McKee; Charlie McKee	Helm; Crew	6	3	5	1	5	-14	-13	1	3	3	1	11	7	6	11	1	91	64
4	Spain	Santiago López-Vázquez; Javier de la Plaza	Helm; Crew	1	8	11	8	4	3	1	11	11	OCS (-18)	5	1	1	-12	10	4	109	79
5	Germany	Marcus Baur; Philip Barth	Helm; Crew	5	1	4	3	-11	-12	11	5	6	9	6	6	10	3	6	6	104	81
6	Australia	Chris Nicholson; Daniel Phillips	Helm; Crew	11	11	1	-14	1	1	12	3	1	6	-17	10	8	5	9	7	117	86
7	Portugal	Afonso Domingos; Diogo Cayolla	Helm; Crew	7	-13	3	6	8	-13	3	4	13	11	8	3	4	11	4	8	119	93
8	New Zealand	Daniel Slater; Nathan Handley	Helm; Crew	-14	9	OCS (-18)	5	12	7	5	12	4	2	3	8	2	7	13	10	131	99
9	Denmark	Michael Hestbæk; Jonatan Persson	Helm; Crew	8	2	7	13	-17	8	9	8	16	12	2	5	OCS (-18)	2	7	9	143	108
10	Ukraine	Rodion Luka; George Leonchuk	Helm; Crew	3	15	RET (-18)	9	14	5	2	OCS (-18)	7	1	13	9	12	9	8	15	158	122
11	Italy	Francesco Bruni; Gabriele Bruni	Helm; Crew	10	12	9	11	13	11	-16	OCS (-18)	5	7	9	7	11	8	16	5	168	134
12	Poland	Paweł Kacprowski; Paweł Kużmicki	Helm; Crew	12	14	8	-16	-16	6	7	13	14	8	12	14	13	15	3	2	173	141
13	Norway	Christoffer Sundby; Vegard Arnhoff	Helm; Crew	16	-17	OCS (-18)	2	2	10	14	7	10	16	10	13	6	17	5	14	177	142
14	France	Dimitri Deruelle; Philippe Gasparini	Helm; Crew	-17	10	12	7	7	9	6	10	8	10	14	12	15	10	DNF (-18)	16	181	146
15	Switzerland	Thomas Rüegge; Claude Maurer	Helm; Crew	15	6	14	4	10	-17	8	9	-17	14	11	15	9	13	12	11	185	151
16	Japan	Kenji Nakamura; Tomoyuki Sasaki	Helm; Crew	4	4	10	15	9	16	-17	15	15	13	16	-17	14	16	14	12	207	173
17	Sweden	John Harrysson; Patrik Sandström	Helm; Crew	9	16	13	DSQ (-18)	15	15	15	14	12	15	15	16	OCS (-18)	14	15	DNF (18)	238	202
