= 2023 Sailing World Championships – 49er =

49er at the 2023 Sailing World Championships
- Venue: The Hague, the Netherlands
- Dates: 11–18 August
- Competitors: 166 from 35 nations

Medalists
gold medal	Bart Lambriex; Floris van de Werken	Netherlands
silver medal	Sébastien Schneiter; Arno De Planta	Switzerland
bronze medal	Diego Botín; Florián Trittel	Spain

The 49er competition at the 2023 Sailing World Championships was the men's skiff event and was held in The Hague, the Netherlands, 11–18 August 2023. The entries were limited to 85 boats. The competitors participated in an opening series that was planned to 15 races, followed by a medal race. The medal race was planned for 18 August.

The competition served as a qualifying event for the 2024 Olympic sailing competition with 10 out of 20 national quota being distributed at the event.

== Summary ==
The entry list included Dutch back-to-back world champions Bart Lambriex and Floris van de Werken. Lambriex and van de Werken had also won the Paris 2024 Test Event the month before. In the Sailing World Cup, Logan Dunning Beck and Oscar Gunn of New Zealand had won the Trofeo Princesa Sofía, Diego Botín and Florián Trittel of Spain had won the Semaine Olympique Française, Lambriex and van de Werken had won the Allianz Regatta, and Łukasz Przybytek and Jacek Piasecki of Poland had won the Kiel Week.

In strong current, Botín and Trittel lead after the first day with two race wins and a fifth place, on the same points as Nevin Snow and Mac Agnese of the United States, also two race wins. When the qualifying series of the opening series concluded on 13 August, Lambriex and van de Werken led 1.8 points ahead of Botín and Trittel. With racing continuing, Lambriex and van de Werken secured their third world championship title before the medal race, being 26.8 points ahead of their next opponent. Second-placed Botín and Trittel, in their turn was 3.2 points ahead of Sébastien Schneiter and Arno De Planta of Switzerland. Through the medal race, Schneiter and De Planta overtook Botín and Trittel in the overall results after a bad start from the Spanish team.

With the final results, national quotas were awarded the Netherlands, Spain, Switzerland, Great Britain, New Zealand, the United States, Croatia, Poland, Denmark and Austria.

== Results ==
Results of individual races
Pos	Crew	Country	I	II	III	IV	V	VI	VII	VIII	IX	X	XI	XII	XIII	XIV	XV	MR	Tot	Pts
Gold medal	Bart Lambriex; Floris van de Werken	Netherlands	1	4	5	2	1	1	3	5	2	10	13^{†}	6	1	1	3	18	76	63
Silver medal	Sébastien Schneiter; Arno De Planta	Switzerland	3	4	3	9	7	5	2	1	6	25^{†}	9	4	12	5	5	16	116	91
Bronze medal	Diego Botín; Florián Trittel	Spain	1	1	5	3	RDG 8	RDG 2.8	1	1	2	8	12	7	4	BFD 26^{†}	16	20	117.8	91.8
4	Isaac McHardie; William McKenzie	New Zealand	2	15	8	7	2	6	6	6	4	2	7	10	RET 26^{†}	9	13	2	125	99
5	Andrew Mollerus; Ian Macdiarmid	United States	11	3	3	8	3	15^{†}	1	12	1	14	6	1	9	8	10	10	115	100
6	James Peters; Fynn Sterritt	Great Britain	3	8	7	2	5	8	5	5	1	1	1	23^{†}	22	17	1	14	123	100
7	Łukasz Przybytek; Jacek Piasecki	Poland	17	1	3	4	4	2	3	1	8	18	24^{†}	5	2	16	20	4	132	108
8	Šime Fantela; Mihovil Fantela	Croatia	4	2	2	7	4	7	8	4	7	13	8	13	17	RET 26^{†}	7	6	135	109
9	Ian Barrows; Hans Henken	United States	5	8	4	3	6	9	6	13	9	7	17^{†}	11	3	12	12	8	133	116
10	Dominik Buksak; Szymon Wierzbicki	Poland	3	11	11	5	11	16^{†}	8	3	1	6	4	9	7	11	14	12	132	116
11	Frederik Rask; Jakob Precht Jensen	Denmark	27^{†}	3	16	1	5	6	9	9	5	17	2	14	6	7	15	–	142	115
12	Benjamin Bildstein; David Hussl	Austria	8	15	10	13	5	4	2	4	2	9	10	18	19	20^{†}	4	–	143	123
13	Erwan Fischer; Clément Péquin	France	17	UFD 29^{†}	11	6	3	3	3	11	10	21	3	16	8	4	11	–	156	127
14	Robert Dickson; Sean Waddilove	Ireland	BFD 29^{†}	2	13	1	4	2	1	2	12	19	15	3	24	BFD 26	6	–	159	130
15	Chris Taylor; Rhos Hawes	Great Britain	14	16	2	6	6	10	7	7	4	12	25^{†}	2	20	15	9	–	155	130
16	Mikołaj Staniul; Jakub Sztorch	Poland	6	6	9	11	11	10	4	10	8	24^{†}	5	8	14	13	17	–	156	132
17	Maximilian Stingele; Linov Scheel	Germany	9	19	8	7	3	13	13	6	4	11	11	22	10	2	23^{†}	–	161	138
18	Uberto Crivelli Visconti; Giulio Calabrò	Italy	14	6	12	11	2	9	5	7	9	4	16	12	23^{†}	18	21	–	169	146
19	Nevin Snow; Mac Agnese	United States	18	1	1	5	15	7	4	14	10	15	23	17	5	14	24^{†}	–	173	149
20	Lucas Rual; Émile Amoros	France	10	17	6	5	1	1	9	10	7	5	21	21	21	BFD 26^{†}	19	–	179	153
21	Tom Burton; Max Paul	Australia	4	6	19	13	19	DNS 29^{†}	5	2	3	16	22	19	16	10	2	–	185	156
22	Kévin Fischer; Yann Jauvin	France	19	4	12	8	1	4	9	5	27^{†}	3	18	24	18	BFD 26	8	–	186	159
23	Logan Dunning Beck; Oscar Gunn	New Zealand	2	UFD 29^{†}	12	10	2	1	4	17	3	20	14	20	13	19	22	–	188	159
24	Hernán Umpierre; Fernando Diz	Uruguay	10	7	14	4	7	3	17	3	17	23	20	15	15	6	25^{†}	–	186	161
25	Daniel Nyborg; Nikolaj Hoffmann Buhl	Denmark	4	9	15	1	16	11	6	22	5	22	19	25^{†}	11	3	18	–	187	162
26	Wen Zaiding; Liu Tian	China	11	18^{†}	13	18	10	8	11	3	9	1	17	6	8	2	1	–	136	118
27	Thomas Needham; Joel Turner	Australia	13	16^{†}	9	10	11	10	7	11	10	10	4	10	3	12	5	–	141	125
28	Julien d'Ortoli; Noé Delpech	France	15	5	6	2	8	15	12	13	19	BFD 30^{†}	18	2	2	4	6	–	157	127
29	Yannick Lefèbvre; Jan Heuninck	Belgium	12	9	9	15	17	4	10	7	24	BFD 30^{†}	12	5	4	1	3	–	162	132
30	Jim Colley; Shaun Connor	Australia	18	11	15	3	9	3	10	17	20	BFD 30^{†}	8	11	1	8	2	–	166	136
31	Leo Takahashi; Tim Morishima	Japan	12	22	7	6	18	5	16	UFD 29^{†}	6	8	6	23	6	3	9	–	176	147
32	Fabian Graf; Tom Heinrich	Germany	5	10	13	10	13	8	10	15	5	6	1	RET 30^{†}	25	11	16	–	178	148
33	Keanu Prettner; Jakob Flachberger	Austria	16	10	8	14	9	5	11	8	21	BFD 30^{†}	13	13	10	5	11	–	184	154
34	Joshua Richner; Nilo Scharer	Switzerland	26^{†}	18	1	11	13	9	7	19	25	4	9	8	7	18	19	–	194	168
35	Jakob Meggendorfer; Andreas Spranger	Germany	15	11	10	12	DSQ 29^{†}	20	8	9	17	13	11	28	5	6	7	–	201	172
36	Elliott Wells; Billy Vennis-Ozanne	Great Britain	9	14	4	8	16	12	15	4	8	17	3	25	23	28^{†}	18	–	204	176
37	Simone Ferrarese; Leonardo Chisté	Italy	25	2	15	12	7	11	14	16	21	BFD 30^{†}	19	1	11	14	12	–	210	180
38	Don Whitcraft; Dylan Whitcraft	Thailand	11	12	6	15	12	13	18	18	14	7	10	4	27^{†}	27	13	–	207	180
39	Wang Xin; Qi Tianyu	China	7	3	1	22	12	18	12	11	18	15.5	29^{†}	15	9	23	15	–	210.5	181.5
40	Albert Torres; Elias Aretz	Spain	10	14	20	22	6	6	19	24	3	5	16	17	16	9	26^{†}	–	213	187
41	Campbell Stanton; William Shapland	New Zealand	16	5	26^{†}	16	10	20	22	14	13	18	2	14	13	16	14	–	219	193
42	Akira Sakai; Russell Aylsworth	Hong Kong	9	7	5	24	12	22	17	19	13	BFD 30^{†}	27	19	12	7	4	–	227	197
43	Malo Kennish; Anatole Martin	France	6	24^{†}	2	21	21	19	19	18	16	3	5	3	22	24	23	–	226	202
44	William Jones; Justin Barnes	Canada	5	13	17	12	14	11	14	16	20	9	22^{†}	20	14	22	20	–	229	207
45	Séafra Guilfoyle; Johnny Durcan	Ireland	14	16	18	28	10	2	BFD 29	12	14	2	7	18	15	26	UFD 30^{†}	–	241	211
46	Shingen Furuya; Akira Takayanagi	Japan	6	8	20	16	22	18	11	14	11	19	26	9	BFD 30^{†}	10	22	–	242	212
47	Oskari Muhonen; Edvard Bremer	Finland	17	23	16	23	18	16	15	2	19	12	24^{†}	7	24	15	8	–	239	215
48	Nick Robins; Alexander Hughes	Great Britain	2	5	19	21	16	DNC 29^{†}	17	10	13	15.5	20	21	21	21	17	–	247.5	218.5
49	Thomas Cunich; Miles Davey	Australia	26	12	18	14	9	12	2	17	16	20	23	24	17	20	RET 30^{†}	–	260	230
50	Kristian Præst; Marcus Langagergaard	Denmark	16	20	17	9	14	16	14	22	STP 7	UFD 30^{†}	21	12	26	13	25	–	262	232
51	James Grummett; Sam Jones	Great Britain	15	7	21	14	22	19	20	15	15	11	14	26^{†}	20	19	21	–	259	233
52	Adam Głogowski; Maciej Krusiec	Poland	13	10	21	21	17	17	16	15	12	BFD 30^{†}	28	16	18	25	10	–	269	239
53	Ganapathy Kelapanda; Varun Thakkar	India	8	18	7	20	8	14	25	20	22	BFD 30^{†}	15	22	19	17	24	–	269	239
54	Ander Belausteguigoitia; Danel Belausteguigoitia	Mexico	STP 8	14	24	15	18	DSQ 29	20	6	16	14	25	27	BFD 30^{†}	DNS 30	DNS 30	–	306	276
55	Jack Ferguson; Jack Hildebrand	Australia	BFD 29^{†}	12	23	13	RET 29	13	18	12	14	4	14	9	4	3	1	–	198	169
56	Marco Grael; Gabriel Simões	Brazil	24	9	14	22	DNF 29^{†}	DNF 29	13	13	11	3	4	11	1	5	15	–	203	174
57	Juuso Roihu; Lasse Lindell	Finland	19	17	10	17	19	21^{†}	21	21	11	5	8	4	11	4	10	–	198	177
58	Christopher Williford; Duncan Williford	United States	BFD 29^{†}	13	20	18	20	DNF 29	18	UFD 29	7	2	7	1	9	2	5	–	209	180
59	Massimo Contessi; Luca Contessi	Argentina	21	17	21	18	15	17	13	8	25^{†}	24	9	10	7	1	6	–	212	187
60	Arie Moffat; Ryan Wood	Canada	BFD 29^{†}	21	26	9	8	14	21	9	18	23	1	23	2	7	11	–	222	193
61	Pavlos Kagialis; Ioannis Orfanos	Greece	STP 8	13	24	19	UFD 29	18	16	23	20	10	2	3	12	UFD 30^{†}	DNC 30	–	257	227
62	Carl Emil Sloth; Simon Christoffersen	Denmark	13	21	17	19	21	DNF 29	15	21	17	16	6	15	DNC 30^{†}	DNC 30	7	–	277	247
63	Tal Sade; Ely Reuveny	Israel	STP 9	25	25	24	17	DNF 29	19	25	26	13	15	5	3	UFD 30^{†}	14	–	279	249
64	Robbert Huisman; Jorn Swart	Netherlands	23	27	22	19	13	23	23	18	18	19	11	12	13	9	DNS 30^{†}	–	280	250
65	Olaf Ganzevles; Stijn Gast	Netherlands	27^{†}	24	23	17	24	14	22	25	22	22	19	14	15	8	3	–	279	252
66	Jens-Christian Dehn-Toftehøj; Mads Fuglbjerg	Denmark	18	UFD 29	11	17	19	21	25	19	24	18	24	19	6	UFD 30^{†}	4	–	284	254
67	Maor Abu; Yam Wirtheim	Israel	STP 22	15	19	20	23	12	24	8	22	9	23	2	DNC 30^{†}	DNC 30	DNC 30	–	289	259
68	Pol Marsans; José Manuel Ruiz	Spain	24	22	23	23	DNF 29	DNS 29	22	21	19	15	17	6	8	DSQ 30^{†}	2	–	290	260
69	Taylor Hasson; Steven Hardee	U.S. Virgin Islands	22	26	14	26	DNF 29^{†}	DNF 29	23	22	15	11	16	13	14	14	17	–	291	262
70	Thomas Staples; William Staples	Canada	28	20	27	26	20	24	UFD 29^{†}	27	23	1	22	21	10	11	9	–	298	269
71	Marius Westerlind; Olle Aronsson	Sweden	20	20	22	DNF 29^{†}	25	17	25	24	24	12	10	24	17	17	13	–	299	270
72	Pedro Costa; João Bolina	Portugal	20	23	28	DNF 29^{†}	20	DNC 29	BFD 29	20	23	20	20	7	5	10	16	–	299	270
73	Koh Yi Nian; Tan Jen-E	Singapore	STP 29^{†}	25	26	25	DNF 29	DNF 29	26	26	27	6	5	17	16	6	8	–	300	271
74	Ricardo Alves; Tiago Alves	Portugal	STP 26	19	27	25	DNF 29^{†}	19	23	23	25	7	18	16	18	13	18	–	306	277
75	Aanand Thakur; Satyam Rangad	India	22	26	25	27	23	DNF 29	26	26	15	14	3	20	20	UFD 30^{†}	12	–	318	288
76	Evangelos Dolianitis; Nikolaos Giotopoulos	Greece	22	NSC 29^{†}	27	DNF 29	DNS 29	DNC 29	24	23	STP 22	21	12	8	19	16	21	–	331	302
77	Casey Law; Jack Dingemans	Hong Kong	19	27	28	25	DNS 29	DNC 29	20	24	26	8	13	22	UFD 30^{†}	15	19	–	334	304
78	Oscar Andersson; Alexander Brorsson	Sweden	STP 21	24	22	23	DNF 29	DNS 29	24	25	26	17	21	18	UFD 30^{†}	12	20	–	341	311
79	Mathias Berthet; Jeppe Nilsen	Norway	21	23	24	4	UFD 29	UFD 29	12	16	12	DNC 30^{†}	DNC 30	DNC 30	DNC 30	DNC 30	DNC 30	–	350	320
80	Teruaki Shimakura; Shintaro Kamisonoda	Japan	23	21	16	20	14	15	21	20	23	DNS 30^{†}	DNC 30	DNC 30	DNC 30	DNC 30	DNC 30	–	353	323
81	Sam Bacon; Cailen Rochford	New Zealand	12	UFD 29	18	16	15	7	DNC 29	DNC 29	DNC 29	DNC 30^{†}	DNC 30	DNC 30	DNC 30	DNC 30	DNC 30	–	364	334
82	Kim Kyoung-duk; Bae Sang-woo	South Korea	1	19	4	27	DNF 29	DNF 29	DNC 29	DNC 29	DNC 29	DNC 30^{†}	DNC 30	DNC 30	DNC 30	DNC 30	DNC 30	–	376	346
83	Willem van der Wal; Corne Janssen	Netherlands	BFD 29	22	25	24	DNF 29	DNF 29	DNC 29	DNC 29	DNC 29	DNC 30^{†}	DNC 30	DNC 30	DNC 30	DNC 30	DNC 30	–	425	395

Scoring system: low-point system; Source:
Legend: – Qualified for medal race(s); BFD – Black flag disqualification; DNC – Did not come to the starting area; DNF – Did not finish; DNS – Did not start; DSQ – Disqualified; NSC – Did not sail the course; RDG – Redress given; RET – Retired; STP – Standard penalty imposed; UFD – "U" flag disqualification; † – Discarded race not counted in the overall result;
