= Sailing at the 2008 Summer Olympics – 49er =

Mixed 49er at the Games of the XXIX Olympiad
- Line drawing of the 49er
- Venue: Qingdao International Sailing Centre
- Dates: First race: 9 August 2008; Last race: 17 August 2008
- Competitors: 38 from 19 nations
- Teams: 19 boats

Medalists
1st place, gold medalist(s)		Jonas Warrer; Martin Kirketerp	Denmark
2nd place, silver medalist(s)		Iker Martínez; Xabier Fernández	Spain
3rd place, bronze medalist(s)		Jan-Peter Peckolt; Hannes Peckolt	Germany

The mixed 49er was a sailing event on the Sailing at the 2008 Summer Olympics program in Qingdao International Sailing Centre. Sixteen races (last one a medal race) were scheduled. Only thirteen races were completed including the medal race due to lack of wind. 38 sailors, on 19 boats, from 19 nations competed. Ten boats qualified for the medal race.

== Race schedule ==
●	Practice race	●	Race on Yellow	●	Race on Red	●	Medal race on Yellow

Date	August																	
Date	7 Thu	8 Fri	9 Sat	10 Sun	11 Mon	12 Tue	13 Wed	14 Thu	15 Fri	16 Sat	17 Sun	18 Mon	19 Tue	20 Wed	21 Thu	22 Fri	23 Sat	24 Sun
Scheduled
Actual	PR			S1,2,3	S4,5,6	Res	S7,8,9	No wind	No wind	S10,11,12	MR							

== Course areas and course configurations ==
For the 49er course areas A (Yellow) and E (Red) were used. The location (36°1'26"’N, 120°26'52"E) points to the center of the 0.6nm radius Yellow course area and the location (36°2'21"N, 120°25'32"E) points to the center of the 0.6nm radius Red course area. The target time for the course was about 30 minutes for all races. The race management could choose from several lengths of the course configuration.

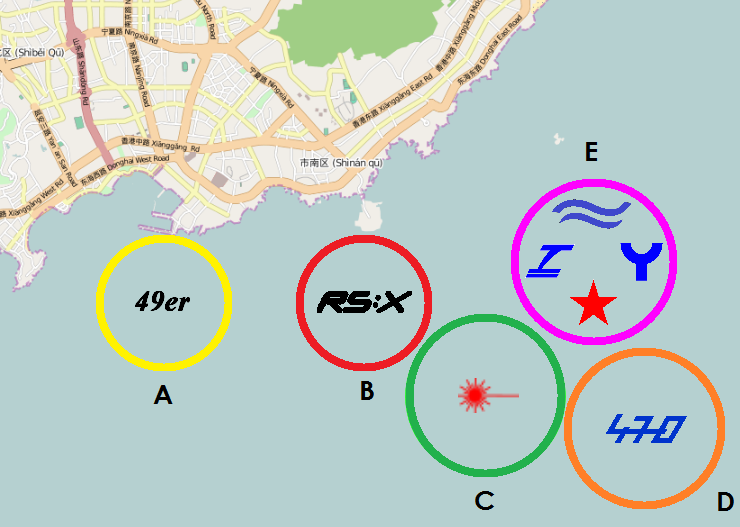
Course Areas

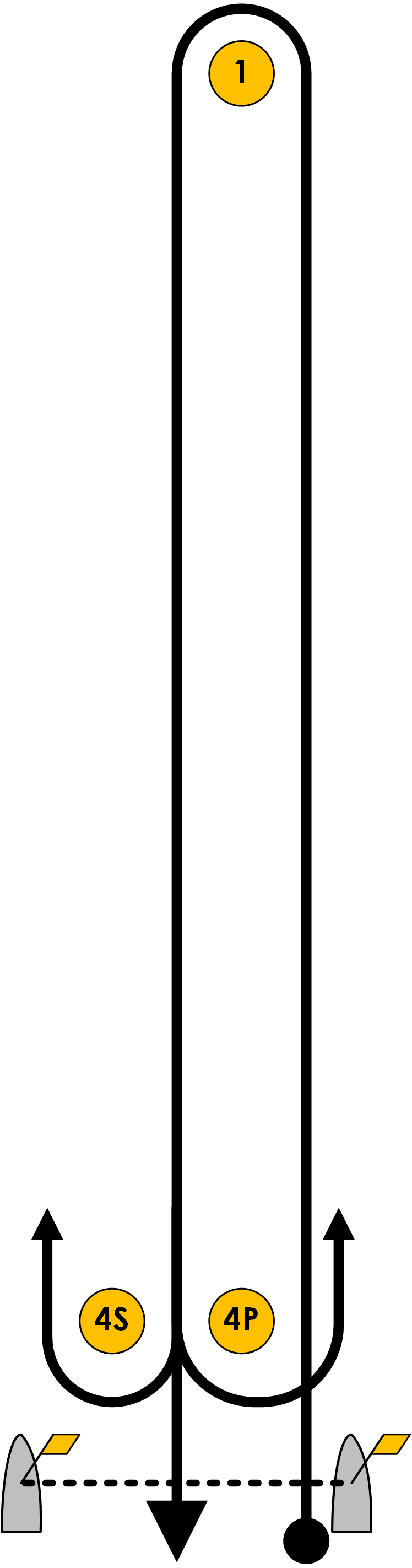
Windward – Leeward Course (W)

=== Windward-Leeward courses ===
- W2: START – 1 – 4s/4p – 1 – FINISH
- W3: START – 1 – 4s/4p – 1 – 4s/4p – 1 – FINISH
- W4: START – 1 – 4s/4p – 1 – 4s/4p – 1 – 4s/4p – 1 – FINISH

== Weather conditions ==
In the lead up to the Olympics many questioned the choice of Qingdao as a venue with very little predicted wind. During the races the wind was pretty light and quite unpredictable. Due to lack of wind (< 1.6 knots) one racing day had to be cancelled and the medal race needed to be postponed to the next day.

== Final results ==
Results of individual races
Pos	Helmsman	Country	I	II	III	IV	V	VI	VII	VIII	IX	X	XI	XII	MR	Tot	Pts
Gold medal	Jonas Warrer; Martin Kirketerp	Denmark	2	4	10^{†}	4	2	3	4	2	9	2	7	8	7	71.0	61.0
Silver medal	Iker Martínez; Xabier Fernández	Spain	1	10	17	2	OCS 20^{†}	5	7	10	3	4	1	2	1	84.0	64.0
Bronze medal	Jan-Peter Peckolt; Hannes Peckolt	Germany	15^{†}	6	11	6	3	2	2	12	4	5	4	7	2	81.0	66.0
4	Pietro Sibello; Gianfranco Sibello	Italy	3	9	1	1	6	9	3	8	12	17^{†}	3	3	4	83.0	66.0
5	Nathan Outteridge; Ben Austin	Australia	DSQ 20^{†}	1	7	3	1	1	6	4	6	12	2	18	6	93.0	73.0
6	Tim Wadlow; Chris Rast	United States	5	14	15	16^{†}	5	10	1	1	1	3	8	4	DNF 11	105.0	89.0
7	André Fonseca; Rodrigo Duarte	Brazil	10	5	8	9	9	4	12	5	11	1	9	13^{†}	8	112.0	99.0
8	Nico Delle Karth; Nikolaus Resch	Austria	9	2	14^{†}	8	13	7	5	7	7	13	5	1	DNF 11	113.0	99.0
9	Stevie Morrison; Ben Rhodes	Great Britain	4	3	5	14	14	15	OCS 20^{†}	3	2	8	11	15	3	120.0	100.0
10	Emmanuel Dyen; Yann Rocherieux	France	7	8	4	5	11	13	11	13	14	7	6	17^{†}	5	126.0	109.0
11	Jorge Lima; Francisco Andrade	Portugal	12	7	9	11	4	DNC 20^{†}	10	6	5	11	13	12		120.0	100.0
12	Akira Ishibashi; Yukio Makino	Japan	8	17^{†}	3	13	8	12	8	9	17	6	14	12		120.0	103.0
13	Christopher Gundersen; Frode Bovim	Norway	11	13	18	7	10	8	14	11	13	19^{†}	12	11		147.0	128.0
14	Gordon Cook; Ben Remocker	Canada	13	12	13	10	7	6	16	16	10	18^{†}	15	16		152.0	134.0
15	Rodion Luka; George Leonchuk	Ukraine	6	11	12	15	DSQ 20^{†}	OCS 20	13	15	8	15	10	14		159.0	139.0
16	Marcin Czajkowski; Krzysztof Kiekowski	Poland	18	15	6	12	15	14	18	18	16	9	19^{†}	6		166.0	147.0
17	Pavle Kostov; Petar Cupać	Croatia	14	16	16	18	OCS 20^{†}	11	9	19	18	10	17	10		178.0	158.0
18	Jonas Lindberg; Kalle Torlén	Sweden	16	18	2	17	12	16	17	14	19	16	16	OCS 20^{†}		183.0	163.0
19	Li Fei; Hu Xianqiang	China	17	19^{†}	19	19	16	17	15	17	15	14	18	9		195.0	176.0

Scoring system: low-point system;
Legend: – Qualified for medal race(s); BFD – Black flag disqualification; DNE – Non excludable disqualification; DNF – Did not finish; DPI – Discretionary penalty imposed; OCS – On the course side of the starting line; † – Discarded race not counted in the overall result;

== Daily standings ==
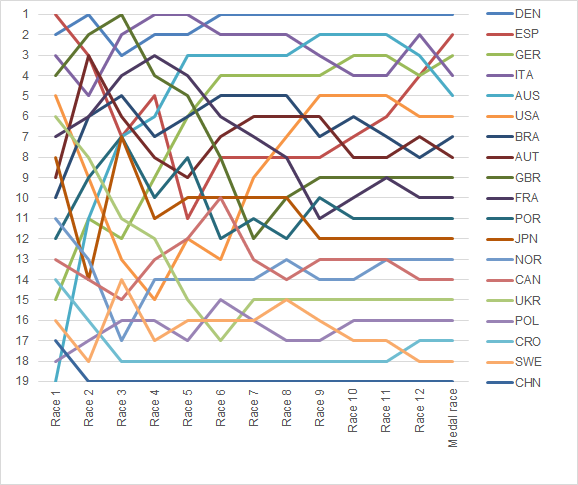
Graph showing the daily standings in the 49er during the 2008 Summer Olympics

== Notes ==
The Danish team of Jonas Warrer and Martin Kirketerp Ibsen, who won the gold medal, almost failed to make it to the start of the Medal race, when their mast split shortly before the start. The Croatian team—who had not made the final race—donated their boat to the Danish team to use in the final, and the Danes subsequently went on to win Gold. The Spanish team filed a protest against the win due to the boat change, but the protest was dismissed and the race results stand. The protest was promoted to the International Olympic Committee but was again dismissed. A third protest was promoted by Italy and Spain to the Court of Arbitration for Sport (CAS), which was also dismissed.

Pavle Kostov, Petar Cupać and their coach Ivan Bulaja were awarded the International Fair Play Committee's Pierre de Coubertin World Trophy for lending their boat.
