= Fraser Brown =

Fraser Brown may refer to:

- Fraser Brown (Australian footballer) (born 1970), Australian rules footballer
- Fraser Brown (rugby union) (born 1989), Scottish rugby union player
- Fraser Brown (sailor) (born 1970), Irish sailor
