= Morgan Larson =

Morgan Larson may refer to:

- Morgan Larson (sailor) (born 1971), an American sailor who has competed in the America's Cup and Extreme Sailing Series
- Morgan Foster Larson (1882–1961), a Republican politician who served as the 40th Governor of New Jersey
