= Kevin Hall (sailor) =

American sailor

Kevin A. Hall (born in Germany) is a sailor who has represented the United States of America at the Summer Olympics and has competed in multiple America's Cup races.

== Personal life ==
Hall graduated from Brown University with degrees in mathematics and French literature. He was also made a member of the Brown Athletic Hall of Fame. He battled testicular cancer when he was 19 and again when he was 22, resulting in the removal of his testicles. He was labeled manic depressive in 1989. He no longer identifies with the label. He has been very open about his relationship with The Truman Show delusion.

Journalist and author Mary Pilon's book "The Kevin Show", released in March 2018, details Hall's struggles with mental illness throughout his life.

== Sailing career ==
He was the 1986 Singlehanded Youth World Champion and the 1987 U.S. Youth Doublehanded Sailing Championship. He was twice Laser national champion. He sailed a Finn in the 1992 Olympic team trials and finished eighth.

He attempted to represent the United States in the Laser at the 1996 Olympics, but was denied a therapeutic use exemption he needed for his testosterone replacement, and finished fifth.

Along with Morgan Larson, Hall finished third in three consecutive 49er World Championships between 1997 and 1999. They won the North American Championship title in 1999, only to finish second at the 2000 Olympic team trials.

Hall was part of America One at the 2000 Louis Vuitton Cup and One World Challenge at the 2003 Louis Vuitton Cup.

He represented United States at the 2004 Summer Olympics sailing in the Finn class, where he finished 11th. Before competing, he again struggled to obtain a therapeutic use exemption to compete.

Hall joined Team New Zealand as navigator and was part of the team that won the 2007 Louis Vuitton Cup before losing the 2007 America's Cup. He also participated in the 2009 Louis Vuitton Pacific Series for Team New Zealand. He joined Artemis Racing for the 2013 America's Cup and was their head of performance and instruments. However, he quit the campaign following the death of Andrew Simpson.

He published a biography called Black Sails, White Rabbits in 2015.
