= Real Club Astur de Regatas =

- Emblem

- Burgee
- Short name: RCAR
- Founded: September 10, 1911; 115 years ago
- Location: Gijón, Spain
- Website: http://www.rcar.es

Real Club Astur de Regatas (Royal Astur Yacht Club) is located in Gijón, Asturias (Spain). It is the oldest and most important yacht club in Asturias.

It was established September 10, 1911. Royal patronage was granted by king Alfonso XIII of Spain soon thereafter. The king was a frequent sailor at the club's regattas during 1912 and 1913 with his yacht Giralda IV.

== Races and fleets ==
From the first 6 metre and Sonderklasse sailboats to the actual 49er dinghy raced by the Alonso brothers, the club has seen fleets come and go, but probably the most regular boat at the club has been the Snipe. The Snipe fleet 152 has been active since 1941. Optimist and Laser fleets have become increasingly active in the past years. Besides dinghy sailing, larger One-Design boats at the club include a First Class 8 fleet.

More than 80 races are organized annually by the club, being the El Gaitero Regatta and the Carlos del Castillo Memorial the most important ones.

== Notable members ==
It was the Spanish yacht club with the largest amount of sailors in the national olympic team during the XXX Olympiad. Those yacht racers were Federico Alonso and his brother Arturo Alonso in 49er class, Ángela Pumariega in Elliott 6m, and Fernando Rodríguez in Star class. Ángela Pumariega won the gold medal in Elliott 6m at the 2012 Summer Olympics.

Federico Alonso won the 1998 world championship in Cadet. Francisco Palacio and Ángela Pumariega won the Spanish national junior championship and placed second at the 2002 junior European championship at Le Havre in the Snipe class. Ángela Pumariega and Carmen Mateo placed second at the women's national championship in Spain and seventh at the women's world championship in 2008, also in the Snipe class. Pablo Vega-Arango was a crew member of the yacht "España" (ESP 22 of the International America’s Cup Class), the Spanish entry at the Louis Vuitton Cup 1992.
