= O'PEN Skiff World Championships =

Sailing worlds for the Open Bic class

The O'PEN Skiff World Championships originally referred to as Open BIC World Open Cup and the Open Bic Sport World Championships is an annual international sailing regatta for O'PEN Skiff they are organized by the host club on behalf of the International Class Association and recognized by World Sailing, the sports IOC recognized governing body.

== Events ==
Event			Host			Age	Participation					Ref.
Ed.	Dates	Year	Host club	Location	Country	Age	No.			Nat.	Cont	Ref.
1	19-21 Jul	2008	Yacht Club de Carnac	Carnac, Morbihan, Brittany	France	Open	71					
2	-	2009		Medemblik	Netherlands							
3	26-30 Dec	2010		Martinique	France							
4	28-31 Jul	2011	Yacht Club Ascona		Switzerland							
5	1-3 Nov	2012	Miami Yacht Club	Miami	United States	U13	43	34	9	9	4	
5	1-3 Nov	2012	Miami Yacht Club	Miami	United States	U15	39	31	8	10	5	
5	1-3 Nov	2012	Miami Yacht Club	Miami	United States	Open	17	14	3	6	3	
6	2-5 Aug	2013	Fraglia Vela Riva	Riva del Garda	Italy	U13	57	43	14	9	4	
6	2-5 Aug	2013	Fraglia Vela Riva	Riva del Garda	Italy	U16	99	70	29	11	4	
7	-	2014	Travemünder Woche	Travemünde, Lübeck	Germany	U13	37			9	4	
7	-	2014	Travemünder Woche	Travemünde, Lübeck	Germany	U16	71			8	3	
7	-	2014	Travemünder Woche	Travemünde, Lübeck	Germany	U19	14			5	2	
8	27 Dec - 6 Mar	2015/16	Safety Beach Sailing Club	Safety Beach, Victoria	Australia	U13	66			6	4	
8	27 Dec - 6 Mar	2015/16	Safety Beach Sailing Club	Safety Beach, Victoria	Australia	U16	51			6	4	
8	27 Dec - 6 Mar	2015/16	Safety Beach Sailing Club	Safety Beach, Victoria	Australia	U19	11	7	4	5	4	
9	18-23 Jul	2016		Quiberon, Morbihan, Brittany	France	U13	55			10	3	
9	18-23 Jul	2016		Quiberon, Morbihan, Brittany	France	U16	127			11	4	
9	18-23 Jul	2016		Quiberon, Morbihan, Brittany	France	U19	15	11	4	5	3	
10	31 Jul - 5 Aug	2017	Circolo Vela Arco	Lake Garda	Italy	U13	55	39	16	11	4	
10	31 Jul - 5 Aug	2017	Circolo Vela Arco	Lake Garda	Italy	U17	132	95	37	12	4	
10	31 Jul - 5 Aug	2017	Circolo Vela Arco	Lake Garda	Italy	team						
11	29 Jul - 3 Aug	2018		Arenys de Mar	Spain	U13	47	29	18	9	3	
11	29 Jul - 3 Aug	2018		Arenys de Mar	Spain	U17	137	96	41	14	4	
12	23 Dec - 4 Jan	2018/19	Manly Sailing Club	Auckland	New Zealand	U13	64			6	4	
12	23 Dec - 4 Jan	2018/19	Manly Sailing Club	Auckland	New Zealand	U17	69			8	4	
N/A	-	2020	Lega Navale Italiana - Sulcis	Porto Pino, Sardinia	Italy	DELAYED TO 2021 DUE TO COVID						
13	12-17 Jul	2021	Lega Navale Italiana - Sulcis	Porto Pino, Sardinia	Italy	U13	74	52	22	5	1	
13	12-17 Jul	2021	Lega Navale Italiana - Sulcis	Porto Pino, Sardinia	Italy	U17	131	86	45	6	2	
14	18-23 Jul	2022	Cercle de la Voile de Bordeaux	Maubuisson, Carcans, Gironde	France	U12	32			7	3	
14	18-23 Jul	2022	Cercle de la Voile de Bordeaux	Maubuisson, Carcans, Gironde	France	U15	153			10	3	
14	18-23 Jul	2022	Cercle de la Voile de Bordeaux	Maubuisson, Carcans, Gironde	France	U17	53			8	3	
15	16-21 Jul	2023	Club Nautico Rimini	Rimini	Italy	U12	32	25	7	7	4	
15	16-21 Jul	2023	Club Nautico Rimini	Rimini	Italy	U15	62	40	22	10	4	
15	16-21 Jul	2023	Club Nautico Rimini	Rimini	Italy	U17	32	17	15	5	2	
16	28 Jul - 2 Aug	2024	Circolo Vela Arco	Lake Garda	Italy	U12	48	34	14	10	4	
16	28 Jul - 2 Aug	2024	Circolo Vela Arco	Lake Garda	Italy	U15	188	125	63	14	4	
16	28 Jul - 2 Aug	2024	Circolo Vela Arco	Lake Garda	Italy	U17	61	34	27	10	3	
17	16-23 Jul	2025	Windward Ocean Club	Nishinomiya	Japan	U13	32	22	10	9	4	
17	16-23 Jul	2025	Windward Ocean Club	Nishinomiya	Japan	U17	61	43	18	10	4	

== Open World championship ==
Year	Rig	Gold	Silver	Bronze	1st Female	Ref.
2008; France	U12	Tom Laperche (FRA)	Gregory CHARPENTIER (FRA)	Jules DUCELIER (FRA)		
2008; France	12+	Denis Tassone (BRA)	Constanza Seguel (CHI)	Santiago Sampaio (POR)		
2008; France	Girls	Constanza SEGEL TAGLE (CHI)	Liede LAMBRIEX (NED)	Elodie MILLANVOIS (FRA)		
2009; Netherlands	U12	Vasco Akkerman (NED)	Bart Lambriex (NED)	Thom Lugthart (NED)		
2009; Netherlands	U15	Kevin Bergers (NED)	Vianney Bergot (FRA)	Junya Fujii (JPN)		
2009; Netherlands		Kevin Bergers (NED)	Diderik Vermeulen (NED)	Vasco Akkerman (NED)		
2010; France	U12	Geronimo Nores (USA)	Thom Lugthart (NED)	Juan Cruz Nores (USA)		
2010; France	U15	Brice Yrieix (FRA)	Simon Jestin (FRA)	Vianney Bergot (FRA)		
2010; France		Yann bourgueil (FRA)	Jimmy Merine (FRA)	Benjamin Daunar (FRA)		
2011; SUI	U12	Florin van Roomen (SUI)	Geronimo Nores (USA)	Ludovico Parisi (FRA)		
2011; SUI	U15	Matteo Tulli (ITA)	Brice Yrieix (FRA)	Lorenzo Rossi (ITA)		
2011; SUI		Hugo Stubler (FRA)	Giacomo Ferrari (ITA)	Vianney Bergot (FRA)		
2012	U13	Sean Herbert (NZL)	Mikey Wolman (BER)	Kristen Wadley (AUS)	3rd Kristen Wadley (AUS)	
2012	U15	Geronimo Nores (USA)	Peter Dill (BER)	Koji Kiuchi (JPN)	6th / Cecilia Wollman (BER)	
2012	Open	Nic Muller (USA)	Andrés Reguero (PRI)	Hugo Stubler (FRA)	11th / Julie Zahniser (USA)	
2013	U13	Kristen Wadey (AUS)	Andrea Spagnolli (ITA)	Ludovico Journo (ITA)	1st / Kristen Wadey (AUS)	
2013	U16	Federico Zampiccoli (ITA)	Guido Gallinaro (ITA)	Paula Igual Garcia (ESP)	3rd / Paula Igual Garcia (ESP)	
2014	U13	Jack Challands (AUS)	Lisa Nukui (JPN)	Davide Mulas (ITA)	2nd / Lisa Nukui (JPN)	
2014	U16	Mattia Journo (ITA)	Giulio Sirolli (ITA)	Federico Zampiccoli (ITA)		
2014	U19	Paula Igual Garcia (ESP)	Veronika Zivna (CZE)	Filippo Monticelli Greenwood (ITA)		
2015	U13	Lennart Frohmann (GER)	Magnus Frohmann (GER)	Leonard Beyer (GER)		
2015	U16	Kristen Wadley (AUS)	Sean Herbert (NZL)	Jack Challands (AUS)		
2015	U19	Veronika Zivna (CZE)	Lars Von Sydow (USA)	Liam Herbert (NZL)	1st / Veronika Zivna (CZE)	
2017	U13	Mathias Coutts (NZL)	Pol Font Reyero (ESP)	Jenna Everett (AUS)	3rd / Jenna Everett (AUS)	
2017	U17	Sean Herbert (NZL)	Lisa Nukui (JPN)	Lennart Frohmann (DEN)	2nd / Lisa Nukui (JPN)	
2018	U13	Breanne Wadley (AUS)	Janka Dmochowska (POL)	Mariona Ventura (ESP)	1st Breanne Wadley (AUS)	
2018	U17	Jake Pye (NZL)	Mattias Coutts (NZL)	Cailen Rochford (NZL)	6th Nora Garcia De La Casa (ESP)	
2019	U13	Breanne Wadley (AUS)	Ted Houry (NZL)	Tiphaine Rideau (FRA)	1st / Breanne Wadley (AUS)	
2019	U17	Davide Mulas (ITA)	Travis Wadley (AUS)	Leopoldo Sirolli (ITA)	6th CJ Perez (USA)	
2020	CANCELLED COVID					
2021	U13	Jozef Krasowski (POL)	Matteo Attolico (ITA)	Daria Pedowska (POL)	3rd / Daria Pedowska (POL)	
2021	U17	Manuel De Felice (ITA)	Leonardo Nonnis (ITA)	Alessandro Guernieri (ITA)	4th / Alessia Tiano (ITA)	
2022	U12	Charles Ganivet (FRA)	Clara Zunquin (FRA)	Irene Cozzolino (ITA)	2nd / Clara Zunquin (FRA)	
2022	U15	Piotr Trella (POL)	Thimothe Lesniak (FRA)	Luca Franceschini (ITA)	8th / Alice virginia Prando (ITA)	
2022	U17	Giulio Siracusa (ITA)	Niccolo Giomarelli (ITA)	Piotr Kuzniarski (POL)		
2023	U12	Sviatoslav Yasnolobov (UKR)	Jan Waskiewicz (POL)	Fabio Serra (ITA)	6th / Aurora Milanese (ITA)	
2023	U15	Ewan Brazle (NZL)	Pepe García (ESP)	Oriol Costabella (ESP)	6th / Clara Zunquin (FRA)	
2023	U17	Niccolo’ Giomarelli (ITA)	Moritz Blum (FRA)	Malte Kreutzer (GER)	4th / Margot Berenger (FRA)	
2024	U12	Samuele Piantoni (ITA)	Côme Zunquin (FRA)	Gabriele Lizzulli (ITA)	5th / Vittoria Silvestri (ITA)	
2024	U15	Ewan Brazle (NZL)	Charles Ganivet (FRA)	Antonio Simbula (ITA)	7th /Clara Zunquin (FRA)	
2024	U17	Federico Poli (ITA)	Enrico Loi (ITA)	Hubert Staron (POL)	5th / Vittoria Cartelli (ITA)	
2025	U13	Louis Letourneur (FRA)	Koa Marsden (JPN)	Summer Torbet (NZL)	3rd / Summer Torbet (NZL)	
2025	U17	Kaison Puls (AUS)	Yamato Hayashida (JPN)	Toshitada Higaki (JPN)	5th / Maya Hodzic (AUS)	
