= Jonatan Persson =

Danish sailor

Personal information
- Nationality: Danish
- Born: 10 December 1970 (age 54); Copenhagen, Denmark

Sport
- Sport: Sailing

Jonatan Persson (born 10 December 1970) is a Danish sailor. He competed in the 49er event at the 2000 Summer Olympics.
