= Molly Meech =

New Zealand sailor (born 1993)

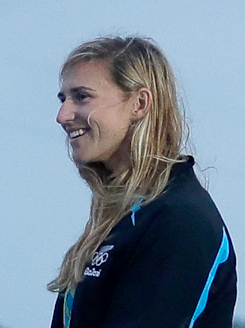
- Meech at the 2016 Olympics

Personal information
- Born: 31 March 1993 (age 33)
- Height: 1.78 m (5 ft 10 in)
- Weight: 74 kg (163 lb)

Sailing career
- Sport: Sailing
- Club: Tauranga Yacht & Powerboat Club
- Classes: 49er FX, 29er, ILCA 6
Medal record
Representing New Zealand
Olympic Games
Silver medal – second place	2016 Rio de Janeiro	49er FX
World Championships
Gold medal – first place	2013 Marseille	49er FX
Bronze medal – third place	2017 Matosinhos	49er FX

Molly Meech (born 31 March 1993) is a New Zealand sailor.

Meech won the 2013 49er FX World Championship and a silver medal at the 2016 Olympics alongside Alex Maloney. During the 2015 ISAF Sailing World Cup, Meech and Maloney competed in the women's 49er FX competitions, winning in Miami and coming second in Weymouth. They again won in Miami to start the 2016 season. Her brother, Sam also competed for New Zealand at the 2016 Olympics.
