= Thomas Rüegge =

Swiss sailor

Personal information
- Nationality: Swiss
- Born: 5 October 1975 (age 50)

Sport
- Sport: Sailing

Thomas Rüegge (born 5 October 1975) is a Swiss sailor. He competed in the 49er event at the 2000 Summer Olympics.
