= Christian Steiger =

Swiss sailor

Personal information
- Nationality: Swiss
- Born: 5 May 1978 (age 46); Belo Horizonte, Brazil

Sport
- Sport: Sailing

Christian Steiger (born 5 May 1978) is a Swiss sailor. He competed in the 49er event at the 2004 Summer Olympics.
