= Vegard Arnhoff =

Norwegian sailor

Personal information
- Nationality: Norwegian
- Born: 7 October 1977 (age 48) Oslo, Norway

Sport
- Sport: Sailing
- Club: Soon Yacht Club

Vegard Arnhoff (born 7 October 1977) is a Norwegian sailor. He was born in Oslo, and represented the Soon Yacht Club. He competed at the 2000 Summer Olympics in Sydney, where he placed 13th in the 49er class, together with Christoffer Sundby.
