= Tom Fitzpatrick (Irish sailor) =

Irish sailor

Personal information
- Nationality: Irish
- Born: 25 December 1974 (age 50); Dublin, Ireland

Sport
- Sport: Sailing

Tom Fitzpatrick (born 25 December 1974) is an Irish sailor. He competed in the 49er event at the 2004 Summer Olympics.
