= Martin Kirketerp =

Danish sailor

Medal record

Men's sailing

Representing Denmark

Olympic Games
Gold medal – first place	2008 Beijing	49er class

Martin Kirketerp Ibsen (born 13 July 1982) is a Danish sailor in the 49er class who sails with Jonas Warrer. At the 2008 Summer Olympics, they stood to win the gold medal before the final round, but their mast broke shortly before start. The Croatian team lent the Danes their boat, and the Danes went on to finish seventh in the round, which would win them the gold medal.

Kirketerp has a blog where he writes about his races and what he is doing.

He joined Team Sanaya as a replacement crew member for legs 5 and 7 of the 2011–12 Volvo Ocean Race.
