= Malav Shroff =

Indian sailor

Personal information
- Nationality: Indian
- Born: 1 May 1974 (age 50)

Sport
- Sport: Sailing

Malav Shroff OLY (born 1 May 1974) is an Indian sailor. He competed in the 49er event at the 2004 Summer Olympics.
