= Vasileios Portosalte =

Greek sailor

Personal information
- Nationality: Greek
- Born: 20 February 1976 (age 49)

Sport
- Sport: Sailing

Vasileios Portosalte (born 20 February 1976) is a Greek sailor. He competed in the 49er event at the 2004 Summer Olympics.
