= Sumeet Patel =

Indian sailor (born 1960)

Personal information
- Nationality: Indian
- Born: 9 October 1960 (age 65)

Sport
- Sport: Sailing

Sumeet Patel (born 9 October 1960) is an Indian sailor. He competed in the 49er event at the 2004 Summer Olympics.
