= Jan-Peter Peckolt =

German sailor

Olympic medal record

Representing Germany

Men's Sailing
Bronze medal – third place	2008 Beijing	49er class

Jan-Peter Peckolt (born 4 May 1981 in Ludwigshafen) is a German sailor. He won a bronze medal in 49er class at the 2008 Summer Olympics.
