= Arturo Alonso Tellechea =

Spanish sailor (born 1983)

Arturo Alonso
Personal information
- Full name: Arturo Néstor Alonso Tellechea
- Nationality: Spanish
- Born: 6 August 1983 (age 42) Buenos Aires, Argentina

Sport
- Country: Spain
- Sport: Sailing
- Club: Real Club Astur de Regatas
Medal record
Sailing
Representing Spain
European Championships
Silver medal – second place	2008	49er class
ISAF Sailing World Cup
Gold medal – first place	2009	49er class
World Championships
Bronze medal – third place	2015 Buenos Aires	49er class

Arturo Néstor Alonso Tellechea (Note: In this Spanish name, the first or paternal surname is Alonso and the second or maternal family name is Tellechea.) (born 6 August 1983) is a Spanish sailor.

Arturo Alonso sails in the 49er class together with his older brother, Federico Alonso. They won the silver medal at the 2008 European Championships, the gold medal at the 2009 ISAF Sailing World Cup, and the bronze medal at the 2015 World Championships.
