= Dennis Dengsø Andersen =

Danish sailor (born 1978)

Personal information
- Nationality: Danish
- Born: 16 May 1978 (age 48)

Sport
- Sport: Sailing

Achievements and titles
- Olympic finals: 2004 Summer Olympics

Dennis Dengsø Andersen (born 16 May 1978) is a Danish sailor. He competed in the 49er event at the 2004 Summer Olympics.
