= Paweł Kacprowski =

Polish sailor

Personal information
- Nationality: Polish
- Born: 17 February 1973 (age 52); Giżycko, Poland

Sport
- Sport: Sailing

Paweł Kacprowski (born 17 February 1973) is a Polish sailor. He competed in the 49er event at the 2000 Summer Olympics.
