= Paweł Kużmicki =

Polish sailor

Personal information
- Nationality: Polish
- Born: 25 August 1973 (age 52); Mrągowo, Poland

Sport
- Sport: Sailing

Paweł Kużmicki (born 25 August 1973) is a Polish sailor. He competed in the 49er event at the 2000 Summer Olympics.

== Sports career ==
A competitor of the AZS-AWFiS Gdańsk club. He started in the Optimist, Cadet, 420, 470 classes and finally started in the 49er class. He started in a pair with Paweł Kacprowski. Polish Champion in the years 1998–2002. In 2005, he changed his partner in the crew, creating a new crew with Tomasz Stańczyk.

Silver medalist at the 1998 European Championships. Participant in the 1997 (9th place), 1999 (5th place), 2001 (10th place), 2003 (6th place), 2004 (25th place), 2006, 2007 European Championships.
