= Claude Maurer =

Swiss sailor

Personal information
- Nationality: Swiss
- Born: 5 January 1975 (age 50)

Sport
- Sport: Sailing

Claude Maurer (born 5 January 1975) is a Swiss sailor. He competed in the 49er event at the 2000 Summer Olympics.
