= Alex Maloney =

American-born New Zealand sailor

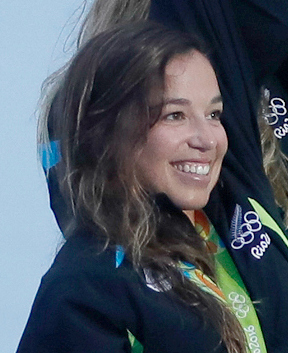
- Maloney at the 2016 Olympics

Personal information
- Full name: Alexandra Maria Maloney
- Born: 19 March 1992 (age 34) Santa Cruz, California, U.S.
- Height: 1.58 m (5 ft 2 in)
- Weight: 56 kg (123 lb)

Sailing career
- Sport: Sailing
- Club: Murrays Bay Sailing Club
- Class: 49er FX
Medal record
Representing New Zealand
Olympic Games
Silver medal – second place	2016 Rio de Janeiro	49er FX
World Championships
Gold medal – first place	2013 Marseille	49er FX
Gold medal – first place	2009 Lake Garda	420
Silver medal – second place	2010 Istanbul	29er
Bronze medal – third place	2007 Cagliari	Optimist
Bronze medal – third place	2017 Matosinhos	49er FX

Alexandra Maria Maloney (born 19 March 1992) is a New Zealand sailor.

Maloney is the sister of sailor Andy Maloney. In 2007 in Cagliari, Italy she won a World Championship medal in the Optimist class. Maloney won the 2013 49er FX World Championship and a silver medal at the 2016 Olympics alongside Molly Meech. During the 2015 ISAF Sailing World Cup, Meech and Maloney competed in the women's 49erFX competitions, winning in Miami and coming second in Weymouth. They again won in Miami to start the 2016 season.
