= Jukka Piirainen =

Finnish sailor

Personal information
- Nationality: Finnish
- Born: 1 April 1969 (age 55); Kuopio, Finland

Sport
- Sport: Sailing

Jukka Piirainen (born 1 April 1969) is a Finnish sailor. He competed in the 49er event at the 2004 Summer Olympics.
