= Santiago López-Vázquez =

Spanish sailor

Personal information
- Nationality: Spanish
- Born: 18 March 1971 (age 54); Santander, Spain

Sport
- Sport: Sailing

Santiago López-Vázquez (born 18 March 1971) is a Spanish sailor. He competed in the 49er event at the 2000 Summer Olympics.
