= Pim van Vugt =

Dutch sailor

Personal information
- Full name: Pim van Vugt
- Born: 25 January 1995 (age 31) Vlaardingen, Netherlands
- Height: 181 cm (5 ft 11 in)

Sailing career
- Sport: Sailing
- Class: 49er

Pim van Vugt (born 25 January 1995 in Vlaardingen) is a sailor from the Netherlands.

By finishing on the eighth place at the 2019 49er & 49er FX World Championships on 8 December 2019 in Auckland, together with his partner Bart Lambriex he grabbed one of the four available international qualification spots for the 2020 Summer Olympics. On 4 October 2020, by finishing on the sixth place at the 2020 49er & 49er FX & Nacra17 European Championships in Lake Attersee in Austria, he also met the full national standards for qualifying for the above.

== Sailing results ==
=== Olympic Games ===
- 6th 2021 Tokyo – 49er class – With Bart Lambriex

=== World Championships ===
- (gold) 2026 Contender Medemblik (NED)
- (gold) 2024 RS500 Bruinisse (NED) – Helmsmen (with sister Lisa van Vugt)
- (gold) 2018 RS500 Weymouth (GBR) – Helmsmen (with sister Lisa van Vugt)
- (gold) 2016 RS500 Travemünde (GER) – Helmsmen (with sister Lisa van Vugt)
- 4th 2025 Contender Garda (ITA)
- 8th 2026 OK dinghy Copenhagen (DEN)
- 8th 2019 49er Auckland (NZL) – Crew (with Bart Lambriex)
- 11th 2020 49er Geelong (AUS) – Crew (with Bart Lambriex)

=== European Championships ===
- (gold) 2024 RS Aero 7 Carnac
- (gold) 2022 Javelin Workum – Helmsmen (with Wouter Stiphout)
- (silver) 2026 OK Dinghy Bruinisse
- 6th 2020 49er – European Championship Attersee

=== National Championships ===
- (gold) 2026 Solo Class Medemblik
- (silver) 2026 IDM OK Dinghy (GER)
- (silver) 2026 Contender class Medemblik
- (gold) 2026 ORC 1 NSR Scheveningen - tacticus Olympix
- (bronze) 2025 FD Loosdrecht – Helm (Crew Jorn Swart)(class championship)
- (gold) 2025 Solo Class Amstelmeer
- (gold) 2025 Contender Class Medemblik
- (bronze) 2025 Quarter Ton Class Muiden – Helm (Crew Wouter Stiphout & Lisa van Vugt)(unrecognized)
- (gold) 2024 Nation & National Champion Solo Bringhtlingsea
- (gold) 2024 Spanker Amstelmeer – Helm (crew Wouter Stiphout)
- (gold) 2024 RS500 Braassem – Helm (crew Olaf Ganzevles)
- (gold) 2024 Solo Class Muiden
- (bronze) 2024 Geman Championship OK class Zwischenahner
- (silver) 2024 German Championship Warnemunde Contender
- (gold) 2024 Solo Sprint class Randmeren
- (gold) 2024 French Championship Dielette Contender
- (gold) 2023 Solo class Braassem
- (gold) 2023 Javelin class Amstelmeer – Helm (crew Wouter Stiphout) (unrecognized)
- (bronze) 2023 Spanker class Heeg – Helm (crew Mart Kegel)
- (gold) 2022 Solo class – Loosdrecht
- (gold) 2022 RS500 Bruinisse – Helmsmen (with sister Lisa van Vugt)
- (gold) 2022 Solo class Sprint – Gouda
- (gold) 2021 Solo class Sneek
- (gold) 2021 National Sailing Leagues J/70 Muiden – Trim (with Sven Coster, Ivo Polderman & Mees de Graaf) (unrecognized)
- (bronze) 2021 SB20 class Medemblik – foredeck/trim (with Jasper ten Berge & Simon Anink)
- (bronze) 2021 Javelin class Heeg – Helmsmen (with sister Lisa van Vugt)
- (gold) 2020 RS500 Bruinisse – Helmsmen (with sister Lisa van Vugt)
- (silver) 2019 RS500 Bruinisse – Helmsmen (with sister Lisa van Vugt)
- (gold) 2019 49er Medemblik – Crew (with Bart Lambriex) (Class Championship)
- (gold) 2018 49er Medemblik – Helmsmen (with Bart Lambriex) (Class Championship)
- (gold) 2018 Solo class Braassemermeer
- (silver) 2017 British Nationals RS100 Netley/Southampton
- (bronze) 2017 49er Medemblik – Helmsmen(with Lars van Stekelenborg) (Class Championship)
- (bronze) 2016 49er FX Medemblik – Crew (with Bart Lambriex) (Class Championship)

=== Others ===
- (gold) 2021 49er Crew – World Cup Allianz Regatta Medemblik
- (bronze) 2016 – RedBull Foiling Generation Crew
- (bronze) 2026 – CowesWeek IRC2 - Tacticus Olympix
- ( (gold) ) 2023 STAR U30 Europeans Attersee- Helmsmen (with Robin Jacobs) NO TITLE/UNCOMPLETED
- ( (gold) ) 2023 STAR European Championship Cannes- U30 Helmsmen (with Robin Jacobs) No Title
