= Pietro Sibello =

Italian sailor (born 1979)

Personal information
- Full name: Pietro Sibello
- Nationality: Italy
- Born: 28 June 1979 (age 47) Albenga, Savona, Italy
- Height: 1.87 m (6 ft 1 1/2 in)
- Weight: 70 kg (154 lb)

Sailing career
- Sport: Sailing
- Club: Gruppi Sportivi Fiamme Gialle
- Coached by: Luca Depedrini
- Class: Skiff
Medal record
Men's sailing
Representing Italy
World Championships
Bronze medal – third place	2005 Moscow	49er
Bronze medal – third place	2009 Riva del Garda	49er
Bronze medal – third place	2010 Port Lucaya	49er
European Championships
Gold medal – first place	2009 Zadar	49er
Bronze medal – third place	2007 Marsala	49er

Pietro Sibello (born 28 June 1979) is an Italian sailor, who specialized in the skiff (49er) class. Together with his elder brother and eventual three-time Olympian Gianfranco, he was named one of the country's top sailors in the skiff boat for two Summer Olympic editions (2004 and 2008) and came close to the medal haul in Beijing (finishing in fourth place). Outside the Games, the Sibello brothers collected a career total of five medals in a major international sailing regatta, including three bronzes from the 49er Worlds and a single Europeans title received in 2009. A member of Fiamme Gialle Sports Group (Italian: Gruppi Sportivi Fiamme Gialle, Pietro trained most of his competitive sailing career under the tutelage of head coach Luca Depedrini.

Sibello made his Olympic debut in Athens 2004, sailing with crew member Gianfranco in the 49er class. There, the Sibello brothers recovered from a haphazard start to sail through the fleet and win the second race. A fusion of scores varying from a couple of fourths to a lowly seventeenth under shifty conditions, however, pushed the Italians to the middle of the fleet and never looked back, sitting them in fourteenth overall with a net grade of 138.

At the 2008 Summer Olympics in Beijing, Sibello competed for the second straight time with Gianfranco in the 49er class. The Italian pair finished fourth in the golden fleet to lock one of the thirteen quota places available at the 2007 ISAF Worlds in Cascais, Portugal. Entered the regatta as the world's no. 2 crew, the Sibello brothers enjoyed the race series comfortably with two straight victories in the third and fourth leg and a random wave of top-five marks along the way to cement their place for the medal round. Lying in the runner-up position, they battled against the Aussies to the front under gusty conditions, until their boat capsized at the final upwind mark let the Spanish, German, and British crews overtake them. The Italians crossed the finish line in fourth and narrowly missed the podium by a slim 5-point margin, amassing 66 net points.

Sibello sought to bid for his third consecutive trip to the Games in London 2012 with Gianfranco after receiving a quota place at the 49er Worlds in Zadar, Croatia; however, the committee's sports medical commission ruled him ineligible to compete for the Italian sailing team, citing health problems.
