= Javier de la Plaza =

Spanish sailor

Personal information
- Nationality: Spanish
- Born: 22 October 1973 (age 51); Santander, Spain

Sport
- Sport: Sailing

Javier de la Plaza (born 22 October 1973) is a Spanish sailor. He competed in the 49er event at the 2000 Summer Olympics.
