= Xabier Fernández =

Spanish sailor (born 1976)

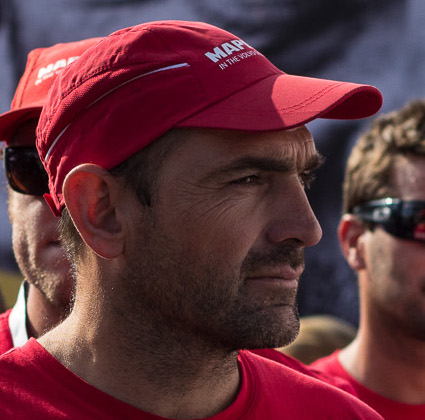

Personal information
- Full name: Xabier Fernández Gaztañaga
- Born: 19 October 1976 (age 49) Ibarra, Basque Country, Spain

Sailing career
- Sport: Sailing
Medal record
Sailing
Representing Spain
Olympic Games
Gold medal – first place	2004 Athens	49er
Silver medal – second place	2008 Beijing	49er
World Championships
Gold medal – first place	2002	49er
Gold medal – first place	2004	49er
Gold medal – first place	2010	49er

Xabier Fernández Gaztañaga (born 19 October 1976) is a Basque Spanish sailor and Olympic champion. Fernandez won a gold medal in the 49er class with Iker Martínez at the 2004 Summer Olympics in Athens. The same pairing won the silver medal at the 2008 Summer Olympics. He has been a crewmember and skipper in the Volvo Ocean Race five times, on board: movistar (2005–06), Telefónica Blue (2008–09), Telefónica (2011–12), and MAPFRE (2014–15, 2017–18).

He sailed with Luna Rossa Challenge in the 2013 Louis Vuitton Cup.

- 2001 World Championship Malcesine (Italy), 2nd position;
- 2001 European Championship Brest (France), 2nd position;
- 2002 World Championship Kāneʻohe (United States of America), 1st position;
- 2002 European Championship Grimstad (Norway), 1st position;
- 2003 European Championship Laredo (Spain), 3rd position;
- 2004 Olympic Games Athens (Greece), 1st position;
- 2004 World Championship Athens (Greece), 1st position;
- 2006 European Championship Weymouth (United kingdom), 3rd position;
- 2007 European Championship Marsala (Italy), 1st position;
- 2008 European Championship S'Arena (Spain), 1st position;
- 2008 Olympic Games Beijing (China), 2nd position;
