= Jena Hansen =

Danish sailor (born 1988)

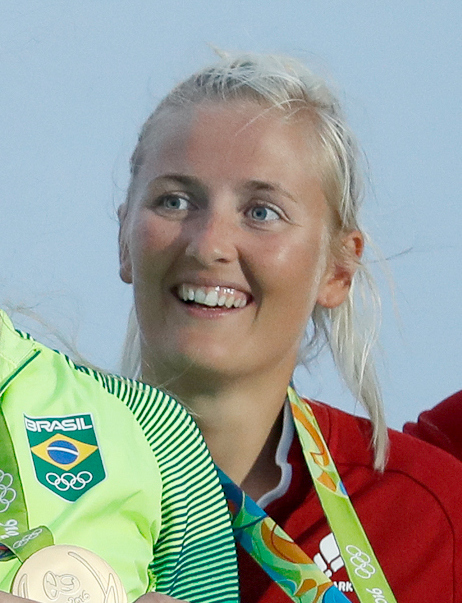
- Hansen at the 2016 Olympics

Personal information
- Born: 10 December 1988 (age 37)
- Height: 1.66 m (5 ft 5 in)
- Weight: 60 kg (132 lb)

Sailing career
- Sport: Sailing
- Club: Hellerup Sejlklub
- Classes: 49er FX, Musto Skiff
Medal record
Representing Denmark
Olympic Games
Bronze medal – third place	2016 Rio de Janeiro	49er FX
World Championships
Gold medal – first place	2017 Matosinhos	49er FX

Jena Mai Hansen (born 10 December 1988) is a Danish sailor in the 49er FX and Musto Skiff classes. Together with Katja Salskov-Iversen she won a bronze medal at the 2016 Olympics.

In 2017–18, she was a crewmember on the yacht Vestas 11th Hour Racing on legs 2, 3, 8, 9, 10, 11 in the Volvo Ocean Race.
