= Floris van de Werken =

Dutch competitive sailor

Personal information
- Full name: Floris van de Werken
- Born: 2 April 1995 (age 31) Warder, Netherlands

Sailing career
- Sport: Sailing
- Class: 49er
Medal record
Men's sailing
Representing Netherlands
World Championships
Gold medal – first place	2021 Wudam Al Sahil	49er
Gold medal – first place	2022 Hubbards, Canada	49er
Gold medal – first place	2023 The Hague, The Netherlands	49er
Silver medal – second place	2024 Lanzarote, Spain	49er

Floris van de Werken (born 2 April 1995 in Warder) is a sailor from the Netherlands. He is a triple World Championship gold medallist and Olympian.

He is, with Bart Lambriex, the 2021, 2022 and 2023 49er World Champion and took a silver medal in the 2024 49er & 49er FX World Championships. The duo got nominated for the Rolex World Sailor of the Year award in 2022 and 2023 but never won the award so far.
