= Wudam Al Sahil =

Coordinates: 23.809°N 57.551°E

Wudam Al Sahil is a coastal village located in the Batinah region, today Al Batinah South Governorate of the Sultanate of Oman. Wudam Al Sahil has a rich history of fishing and trade with countries such as India and East Africa. Today Wudam Al Sahil is home to the Said bin Sultan Naval Base, Al Musannah Sports City and The Millennium Resort. The village hosted the 2010 Asian Beach Games.
