= Jyrki Järvi =

Finnish sailor

Personal information
- Full name: Jyrki Heikki Järvi
- Nickname: JJ
- Born: 7 February 1966 (age 60) Helsinki, Finland
Medal record
Sailing
Representing Finland
Olympic Games
Gold medal – first place	2000 Sydney	49er class

Jyrki Heikki Järvi (born 7 February 1966 in Helsinki) is a Finnish sailor and Olympic champion. Nicknamed "JJ", Järvi won a gold medal in the 49er Class with Thomas Johanson at the 2000 Summer Olympics in Sydney.
