= Marcus Baur =

German yacht racer

Marcus Baur OLY (born 10 May 1971 in Kiel, Germany) is a German former Olympic sailor, architectural engineer, and entrepreneur. He is the founder and chief executive officer of Goalscape Software GmbH, a company that develops visual goal-management tools.

== Early life and education ==
Baur studied architectural engineering at the University of Applied Sciences in Kiel, where his diploma thesis explored the architectural theory of Christopher Alexander.

== Sailing career ==
Baur began sailing in the Optimist class before progressing to the 420, 470, and 49er classes. He represented Germany in the 49er class at the 2000 Summer Olympics in Sydney with crew Philipp Barth, and at the 2004 Summer Olympics in Athens with Max Groy.

He won three European titles and several medals at world and regional championships in the 49er class. Prior to the Sydney Olympics, Baur was ranked number one in the world and went on to finish fifth in the Olympics. In the Athens 2004 Olympic Games he placed ninth after gear failure in one of the last races.

== Post-sailing career ==
After retiring from competitive sailing, Baur co-founded and managed several ventures in the sailing and sports-technology industries, including Sailtracks, SAP Sailing Analytics, Sailing Team Germany, and Sail Insight.

He was part of the core development and marketing team behind SAP Sailing Analytics between 2009 and 2022 and served as product owner for the Sail Insight app powered by SAP. These tools were used at major international regattas to provide live race tracking and data analytics, helping to make sailing more accessible to broader audiences.

From 2016 to 2020, Baur acted as executive producer for the live and highlight film production of the Sailing World Cup, introducing cost-efficient technologies such as onboard smartphone cameras and consumer drones to enhance sailing broadcasts.

=== Goalscape Software ===
During the Covid Pandemic, Baur revived a business he originally started in 2009. Based on a US patent granted to Baur in 2015, Goalscape Software GmbH designs and develops an innovative Visual Goal Management solution called Goalscape. The concept is based on a holistic and visual approach to setting goals. It is related to the theory of Centers, pioneered by Architect Christopher Alexander in his book The Nature of Order.

Goalscape has been adopted in business, sports, and educational contexts as a visual method for managing goals and priorities.

=== Other activities ===
He also acted as a member of the Olympic Channel Commission of the International Olympic Committee.
