= Fraser Brown (sailor) =

Irish sailor

Personal information
- Nationality: Irish
- Born: 12 February 1970 (age 56) Newtownards, Northern Ireland

Sport
- Sport: Sailing

Fraser Brown (born 12 February 1970) is an Irish sailor. He competed in the 49er event at the 2004 Summer Olympics.
