= Daniel Phillips (sailor) =

Australian sailor

Personal information
- Nationality: Australian
- Born: 27 January 1971 (age 55) Sydney, Australia

Sport
- Sport: Sailing

Daniel Phillips (born 27 January 1971) is an Australian sailor. He competed in the 49er event at the 2000 Summer Olympics.
