= Simon Hiscocks =

British sailor

Personal information
- Full name: Simon John Hiscocks
- Born: 21 May 1973 (age 53) Dorking, Surrey, England
- Height: 183 cm (6 ft 0 in)

Sailing career
- Sport: Sailing
- Club: Weymouth and Portland Sailing Academy
- Class: 49er
Medal record
Sailing
Representing Great Britain
Event	1st	2nd	3rd
Olympic Games	0	1	1
Sailing World Championships	2	3	0
Total	2	4	1
Olympic Games
Silver medal – second place	2000 Sydney	49er
Bronze medal – third place	2004 Athens	49er
World Championships
Gold medal – first place	2003 Cádiz	49er
Gold medal – first place	2006 Aix-le-Bains	49er
Silver medal – second place	2002 Kāneʻohe	49er
Silver medal – second place	2004 Athens	49er
Silver medal – second place	2005 Moscow	49er

Simon John Hiscocks (born 21 May 1973 in Dorking, Surrey) is a British sailor. He won a bronze medal for Great Britain at the 2004 Summer Olympics in the 49er. Hiscocks also won a silver medal at the 2000 Summer Olympics in the same category. Hiscocks since raced in the America's cup for the GreenCom Team.

He lives in Portland, Dorset and has two children, Amelie and Louis.

He is the founder of Shock Sailing, who manufacture parts for high performance sailboats, perform boat repairs, broker the sale of new and used dinghies, and manufacture sailing accessories. Since his Olympic career, Hiscocks has been prominent in the Foiling Moth class, and since its launch in 2022, the Switch one design, with Simon has seen the growth of in the UK and beyond and in other high performance skiffs.

Hiscocks has since rebuilt a Trimaran, after breaking it on his travels home. The 6 year repair was finally finished in the summer of 25, where Simon launched the Newly painted boat into the Portland waters, and it is the next step in Simon's career.
