= Florian Trittel =

Spanish sailor (born 1994)

Personal information
- Full name: Florian Johannes Trittel Paul
- Nationality: Spanish
- Born: 23 May 1994 (age 32) Münsterlingen, Switzerland
- Height: 186 cm (6 ft 1 in)

Sailing career
- Sport: Sailing
- Classes: 49er; Nacra 17; Formula Kite; 29er, Foiling50; IKA - Open; TR 3.6
Medal record
Men's Sailing
Representing Spain
Olympic Games
Gold medal – first place	Paris 2024	49er
World championships
Gold medal – first place	2012 Travemünde	29er
Silver medal – second place	2022 St. Margarets Bay	49er
Bronze medal – third place	2023 The Hague	49er
Bronze medal – third place	2024 Lanzarote	49er
European Championships
Silver medal – second place	2014 Mielno	Kite
Bronze medal – third place	2016 Cagliari	Kite
Gold medal – first place	2022 Aarhus	49er

Florian Johannes Trittel Paul (Note: In this Spanish name, the first or paternal surname is Trittel and the second or maternal family name is Paul.) (born 23 May 1994) is a Spanish sailor and Olympic gold medalist.

== Career ==
Florian Trittel was born 23 May 1994 in Münsterlingen, Switzerland, and has lived in Spain since the age of three. As son to a German family of sailors living in Barcelona, he started sailing as a six-year-old at Club Nàutic d'Arenys de Mar and later progressed training at Club Nàutic El Balís de Sant Andreu de Llavaneres, Barcelona. He represents the Royal Spanish Sailing Federation internationally.

He has professional experience in various sailing classes. In 2012, he won the World Championships of the 29er class in tandem with Carlos Robles. As solo-athlete in kite surfing, he scored a silver medal in the Formula Kite European Championships in 2014 and bronze in 2016. In the 49er class, he has shown world class with scores of three consecutive medal wins in the 49er World Championship between the years 2022 and 2024 together with Diego Botín, as well as gold in the 49er European Championship of 2022.

Trittel has competed in two Summer Olympics. He finished sixth in Tokyo 2020 in the Nacra 17 class in tandem with Tara Pacheco. In Paris 2024, he won his first Olympic gold medal in the 49er class together with Diego Botín, making it the first gold medal win for Spain in those Olympics.

He is part of the Spanish national team for SailGP and helped the team win season four with Diego Botin as driver and himself as wing trimmer.
