= Bart Lambriex =

Dutch competitive sailor

Personal information
- Born: 3 October 1998 (age 28) Haarlem, Netherlands

Sailing career
- Sport: Sailing
- Class: 49er
Medal record
Men's sailing
Representing Netherlands
World Championships
Silver medal – second place	2009	Open Bic
Silver medal – second place	2011 Napier	Optimist
Bronze medal – third place	2022 Alicante	esailing
Men's 49er World Championship
Gold medal – first place	2021 Wudam Al Sahil	49er
Gold medal – first place	2022 Canada	49er
Gold medal – first place	2023	49er
Silver medal – second place	2024	49er
Silver medal – second place	2025	49er
Bronze medal – third place	2026	49er

Bart Lambriex (born 3 October 1998) is a Dutch sailor.

Lambriex was born in Haarlem on 3 October 1998. By finishing eighth place at the 2019 49er & 49er FX World Championships, held in December 2019 in Auckland, together with his partner Pim van Vugt, he secured one of the four available international qualification spots for the 2020 Summer Olympics.) On 4 October 2020, by finishing on the sixth place at the 2020 49er, 49er FX, & Nacra 17 European Championships in Lake Attersee in Austria, he also met the full national standards for qualifying for the above.

He is, with Floris van de Werken, the 2021 and 2022 49er World champion

Lambriex is the son of Dutch sailor Huub Lambriex.
