= Katja Salskov-Iversen =

Danish sailor in the 49er FX class (born 1994)

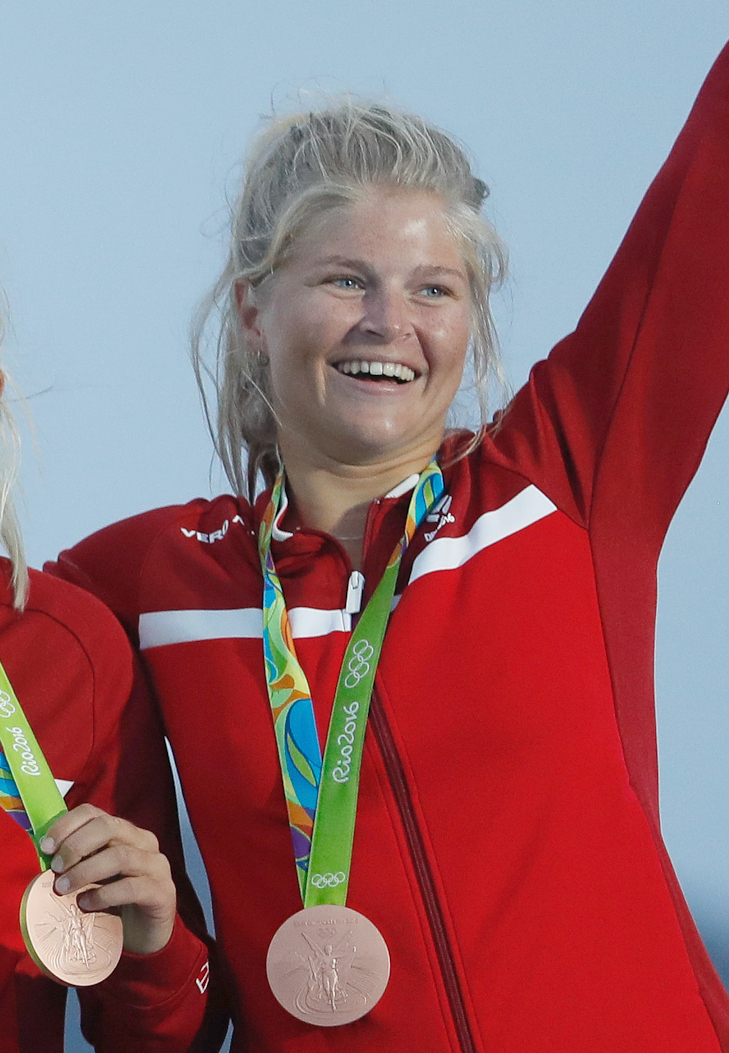
- Salskov-Iversen at the 2016 Olympics

Personal information
- Born: 19 August 1994 (age 31)
- Height: 1.73 m (5 ft 8 in)
- Weight: 70 kg (154 lb)

Sailing career
- Sport: Sailing
- Club: Hellerup Sejlklub; Yachtklubben Furesøen
- Coached by: Peter Hansen
- Class: 49er FX
Medal record
Representing Denmark
Olympic Games
Bronze medal – third place	2016 Rio de Janeiro	49er FX
World Championships
Gold medal – first place	2017 Matosinhos	49er FX

Katja Steen Salskov-Iversen (born 19 August 1994) is a Danish sailor in the 49er FX class. Together with Jena Hansen she won a bronze medal at the 2016 Olympics.
