= Christoffer Sundby =

Norwegian sailor

Personal information
- Full name: Jon Christoffer Sundby
- Born: 26 September 1978 (age 47) Arendal, Norway
- Height: 171 cm (5 ft 7 in)

Sailing career
- Sport: Sailing
Medal record
Sailing
Representing Norway
World Championships
Gold medal – first place	1997	Europe class
Silver medal – second place	1996	Europe class
Silver medal – second place	2003 Cádiz	49er

Jon Christoffer Sundby (born 26 September 1978) is a Norwegian sailor.

He received a gold medal in the Europe class at the 1997 world championships.

He competed at the 2000 Summer Olympics in Sydney together with Vegard Arnhoff, where they finished thirteenth in the 49er class. At the 2004 Summer Olympics in Athens he competed together with Frode Bovim, finishing fourth in the 49er class.

As of 2024, Sundby is the CEO of Spenn, a currency for loyalty programs. The company is owned by Strawberry and Norwegian.
