= Arno De Planta =

Swiss sailor

Personal information
- Nationality: Swiss
- Born: 12 March 1999 (age 27) Pully, Switzerland

Sailing career
- Sport: Sailing
- Club: CVV (SUI)
- Coached by: Ian Barker
- Class: 49er
Competition record
Men's sailing
Representing Switzerland
World Championships
Silver medal – second place	2023 The Hague	49er
- Updated on 30 July 2024

Arno De Planta (born 12 March 1999) is a Swiss sailor. He and Sébastien Schneiter won silver in the 49er event at the 2023 Sailing World Championships. They went on to compete together at the 2024 Paris Olympics where they reached the medals race and placed 8th overall.
