= Sonderklasse =

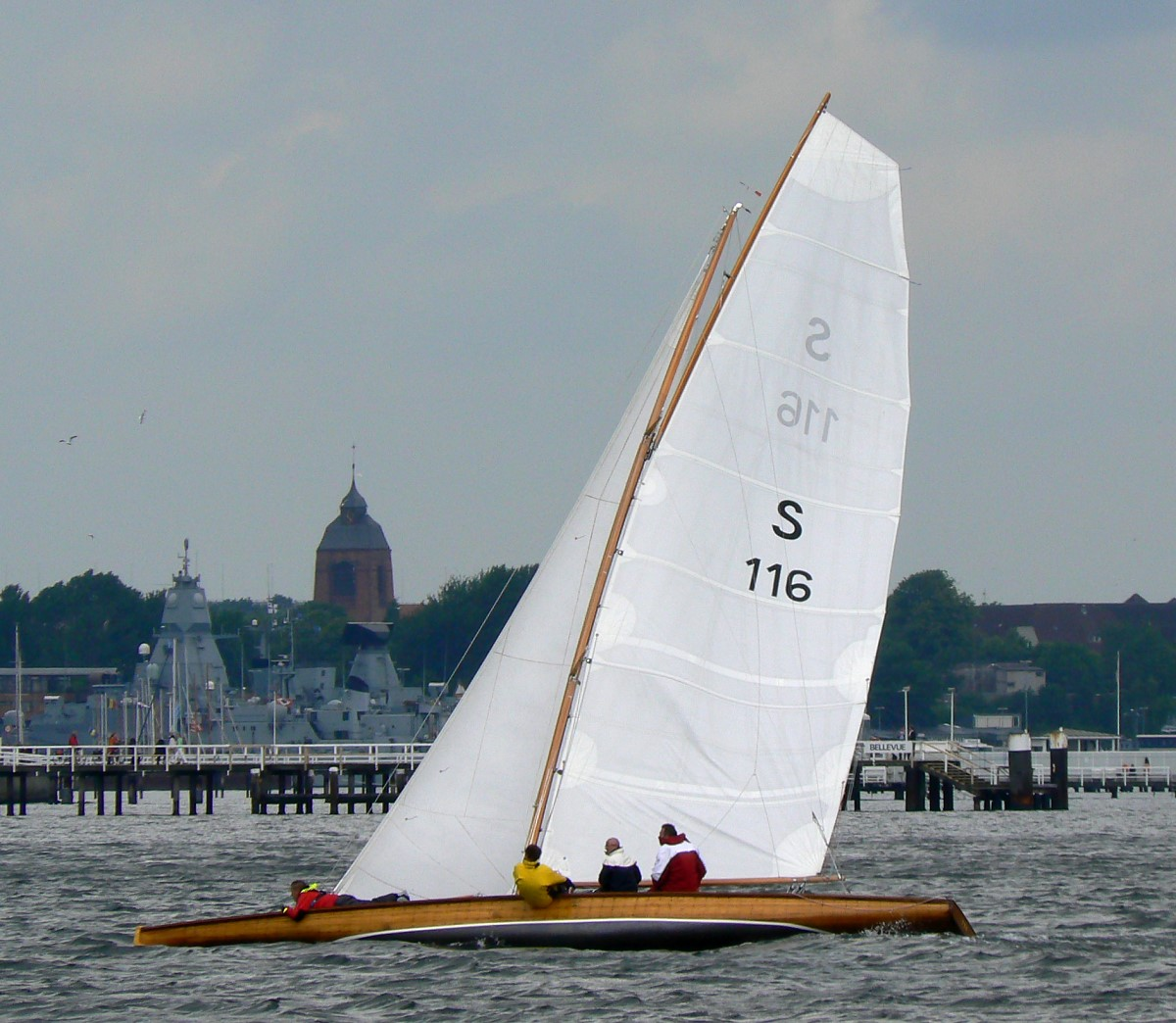
- Sonderklasse-boat

Development
- Year: 1898 (rule design)
- Design: Development class

Sonderklasse (lit. Special class) is a sailing class designed in 1898 by Lübecker Yacht-Club, Norddeutscher Regatta Verein and Kieler Yacht-Club.
