= Federico Alonso (sailor) =

Spanish sailor

Personal information
- Nationality: Spanish
- Born: 15 August 1981 (age 45) Buenos Aires, Argentina

Sport
- Country: Spain
- Sport: Sailing
- Club: Real Club Astur de Regatas
Medal record
Representing Spain
Sailing
World Championships
Gold medal – first place	1998	Cadet class
Bronze medal – third place	2015	49er class
European Championships
Silver medal – second place	2008	49er class
ISAF Sailing World Cup
Gold medal – first place	2009	49er class

Federico Alonso Tellechea (born 15 August 1981 in Buenos Aires) is a Spanish sailor.

Alonso won the Cadet class World Championships in 1998. In the 49er class, he won the silver medal at the 2008 European Championships, the gold medal at the 2009 ISAF Sailing World Cup, and the bronze medal at the 2015 World Championships.
