= Mihovil Fantela =

Croatian sailor (born 1990)

Personal information
- Nationality: Croatian
- Born: 22 March 1990 (age 36) Zadar, SR Croatia, SFR Yugoslavia
- Height: 1.87 m (6 ft 1 in)

Sailing career
- Sport: Sailing
- Class(es): RS:X, 49er, Optimist, 470, 420
Medal record
Sailing
Representing Croatia
World Championships
Gold medal – first place	2018 Aarhus	49er
Bronze medal – third place	2022 St. Margarets Bay	49er

Mihovil Fantela (born 22 March 1990) is a Croatian sailor. He and his older brother Šime Fantela competed for Croatia at the 2020 Summer Olympics in the 49er event, and again in the same event at the 2024 Summer Olympics.

== Acknowledgements ==
- City of Zadar Award (2018)
