= Thanasis Pakhoumas =

Greek sailor

Thanasis Pachoumas
Personal information
- Nationality: Greek
- Born: 21 February 1966 (age 59)

Sport
- Sport: Sailing

Thanasis Pachoumas (born 21 February 1966) is a Greek sailor. He competed at the 1992 Summer Olympics and the 2004 Summer Olympics.
