= Yachting Association of India =

Governing body for watercraft in India

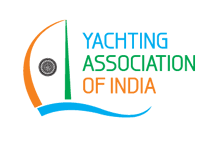
- Sport: Sailing, windsurfing, motor boating, powerboat racing and personal watercraft
- Jurisdiction: India
- Membership: 55 affiliate clubs
- Abbreviation: YAI
- Founded: 15 May 1960; 66 years ago
- Affiliation: World Sailing
- Regional affiliation: Asian Sailing Federation
- Headquarters: Chanakyapuri, New Delhi
- President: Admiral Sunil Lanba
- Secretary: Rear admiral Atul Anand

Official website
- www.yai.org.in
- (India)

The Yachting Association of India (YAI) is the governing body for sailing, windsurfing, motorboating, powerboat racing and personal watercraft, at sea and on inland waters in India. Legally, it is a non-profit association registered under the West Bengal Societies Registration Act, 1961. The YAI was founded on 15 May 1960 and legally registered on 22 December 1964 at Calcutta, West Bengal. The YAI is affiliated to World Sailing, the world governing body for the sport of sailing, and is also officially recognized by the Indian Olympic Association and the Ministry of Youth Affairs and Sports.

Surjit Singh Majithia, the then Deputy Minister of Defence, served as YAI's first President. Majithia and YAI's third President, Indian Army Lt. Gen. Jayanto Nath Chaudhuri, are the only YAI Presidents to not come from the Indian Navy. Since Admiral Adhar Kumar Chatterji became President of the YAI in April 1966, the Chief of the Naval Staff has served as the YAI President.
