= George Leonchuk =

Ukrainian sailor (born 1974)

Personal information
- Born: 24 May 1974 (age 52) Potsdam, East Germany

Sailing career
- Sport: Sailing
Medal record
Sailing
Representing Ukraine
Olympic Games
| Silver medal – second place | 2004 Athens | 49er class |

George Leonchuk (Ukrainian: Георгій Ігорович Леончук, tr. Heorhiy Ihorovych Leonchuk; born 24 May 1974 in Potsdam, German Democratic Republic) is a Ukrainian sailor.

== Career highlights ==
World Championships
2001 – Malcesine, (bronze) 3rd, 49er (with Rodion Luka)
2002 – Hawaii, 5th, 49er (with Rodion Luka)
2003 – Cádiz, (bronze) 3rd, 49er (with Rodion Luka)
2005 – Moscow, (gold) 1st, 49er (with Rodion Luka)
2006 – Aix-les-Bains, 9th, 49er (with Rodion Luka)
2007 – Cascais, 14th, 49er (with Rodion Luka)
2008 – Sorrento, (bronze) 3rd, 49er (with Rodion Luka)
Summer Olympics
2000 – Sydney, 10th, 49er (with Rodion Luka)
2004 – Athens, (silver) 2nd, 49er (with Rodion Luka)
European Championships
2000 – Medemblik, (bronze) 3rd, 49er (with Rodion Luka)
2001 – Brest, 4th, 49er (with Rodion Luka)

2007 – Marsala, 13th, 49er (with Rodion Luka)

Other achievements
2000 – Kiel, Kiel Week, (silver) 2nd, 49er
2001 – Medemblik, Spa Regatta, (gold) 1st, 49er
2001 – Kiel, Kiel Week, (silver) 2nd, 49er
2002 – Medemblik, Spa Regatta, (silver) 2nd, 49er
2003 – Hyères, Semaine Olympique Française, (gold) 1st, 49er
2003 – Medemblik, Spa Regatta, (bronze) 3rd, 49er
2005 – Miami, Rolex Miami OCR, (silver) 2nd, 49er
2006 – Miami, Rolex Miami OCR, (bronze) 3rd, 49er
2006 – Miami, North American Championships, (bronze) 3rd, 49er
2010 – Sanremo, Italian Championship, (gold) 1st, Dragon
2010 – Marstrand, Swedish Championship, (gold) 1st, Dragon
2010 – Marstrand, BMW Dragon Gold Cup, (silver) 2nd, Dragon
