= Morgan Larson (sailor) =

American sailor

Personal information
- Born: March 4, 1971 (age 55) Santa Cruz, California, U.S.

Sailing career
- Sport: Sailing
- College team: College of Charleston
Medal record
Sailing
Representing United States
World Championships
Bronze medal – third place	2012 Newport	Melges 32
Silver medal – second place	2009 Palma	TP 52
Gold medal – first place	2008 Lanzarote	TP 52
Gold medal – first place	2008 Florida	Farr 40
Gold medal – first place	2004 Santa Cruz	505
Bronze medal – third place	1999 Melbourne	49er
Bronze medal – third place	1998 Bandol	49er
Bronze medal – third place	1997 Perth	49er
North American Championships
Gold medal – first place	2007 Miami	49er
Gold medal – first place	1999 Sonora	49er
European Championships
Silver medal – second place	2005 Vallensbæk	49er

Morgan Larson (born March 4, 1971) is an American sailor.

Larson was born in Santa Cruz, California, and attended the College of Charleston where he was the Collegiate Men's Singlehanded National Champion and three-time All-American sailor.

He has sailed in the 2000 Louis Vuitton Cup with AmericaOne, the 2003 Louis Vuitton Cup with One World Challenge and the 2007 Louis Vuitton Cup with Victory Challenge. He sailed in the 2010 Louis Vuitton Trophy with Mascalzone Latino.

He has also participated in the Extreme Sailing Series as Tactician/Helm on Team Alinghi.
