= Rodion Luka =

Ukrainian sailor

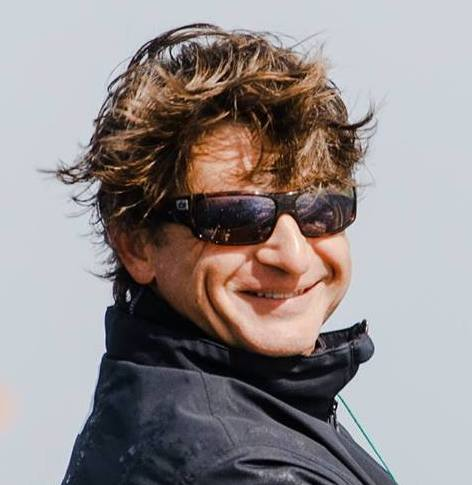

Personal information
- Native name: Родіон Михайлович Лука
- Full name: Rodion Mykhailovych Luka
- Born: 29 October 1972 (age 53)
- Spouse: Anastasiia
- Children: 2

Sailing career
- Sport: Sailing
Medal record
Sailing
Representing Ukraine
Olympic Games
Silver medal – second place	2004 Athens	49er class

Rodion Mykhailovych Luka (Ukrainian: Родіон Михайлович Лука; born 29 October 1972) is a Ukrainian yachtsman, Merited Sports Master, silver medallist of the Olympic Games 2004, Class 49er World Champion 2005, European Champion, and Sportsman 2005 in Ukraine. In August 2015 Luka was elected as the President of the Sailing Federation of Ukraine.

== Biography ==
Rodion Luka went to the Vyshhorod (Ukraine, Kyiv region) secondary school. When he was 11, he quit playing the piano at the music school and took to sailing. He gained his first experience in this field during practice sessions at the Kyiv Reservoir. In 1985, Luka bore the bell in sailing – he won the USSR (Ukrainian Soviet Socialist Republic) “Republican Regatta” and started preparing for the USSR (Union of Soviet Socialist Republics) Youth Championship. In 1988, he won all the youth competitions, including the Ukrainian Championship and USSR (Union of Soviet Socialist Republics) Championship. Henceforward, Rodion Luka starts going in for sailing professionally.

== Education ==
In 1995, Luka graduated from the National University of Physical Education and Sports of Ukraine, with a specialization in “Professional and Olympic Sports Management”.. Luka then graduated from Kyiv State Maritime Academy with the specialization “Navigator, Ship Driver” in 1999.

== Professional achievements ==
Rodion Luka obtained his first international prize in 1993. He became the gold medallist in the Warnemünde Laser-Radial-Class Regatta, and bronze medallist in the European Championship in Sardinia (Italy).

- In 1994, the sportsman captured silver of the European Championship in England and World Championship in Japan.
- In 1996, Rodion Luka represents Ukraine in the Laser-Class Olympic Games.
- Next year, he starts the Olympic Sydney 2000 49er-Class Campaign together with Georgiy Leonchuk.
- In 1999, Rodion Luka obtains a license to compete in the Olympics 2000, where he ranks the tenth. Coincidently, he takes the title of the Champion of Australia and wins the bronze in the 49er-Class European Championship.
- In 2000s, Rodion Luka made the greatest professional breakthrough in yachting sport. He and his team headed the list in the ISAF (International Sailing Federation) World Ranking (2002-2003), won the 49er-class championship and took the lead in the world ranking (2005).
- In 2005, Rodion Luka obtains the title of the Sportsman of the Year in Ukraine according to the National Olympic Committee.
- In 2008, he becomes a bronze medalist of the European and World Championships, and in 2012 – SB20-Class Champion of England, Russia and Europe.

== Volvo Ocean Race ==
In 2008–2009, Luka was the only Ukrainian who competed in the most prestigious Volvo Ocean Race global sailing regatta on the “Kasatka (Killer Whale)” yacht as a steersman for Team Russia.

== Coaching and training ==
- In 2012–2013, Rodion Luka works as the RC44-class coach.
- In 2012, he establishes the yachting school – KievRacingYachtClub. The Club created the conditions for yachting for the people who have neither time, nor money to buy and maintain own yachts. The Club organizes amateur regattas; the Club teams continuously participate in international competitions.

== Career highlights ==
World Championships
1997 – Perth, 32nd, 49er
1998 – Bandol, 14th, 49er
1999 – Melbourne, 15th, 49er
2001 – Malcesine, (bronze) 3rd, 49er
2002 – Hawaii, 5th, 49er
2003 – Cádiz, (bronze) 3rd, 49er (with George Leonchuk)
2004 – Athens, 14th, 49er
2005 – Moscow, (gold) 1st, 49er
2006 – Aix-les-Bains, 9th, 49er (with George Leonchuk)
2007 – Cascais, 14th, 49er (with George Leonchuk)
2008 – Sorrento, (bronze) 3rd, 49er (with George Leonchuk)
Summer Olympics
1996 – Atlanta, 35th, Laser
2000 – Sydney, 10th, 49er (with George Leonchuk)
2004 – Athens, (silver) 2nd, 49er (with George Leonchuk)
European Championships
1996 – Quiberon, 21st, Laser
1998 – Helsinki, 18th, 49er
2000 – Medemblik, (bronze) 3rd, 49er
2001 – Brest, 4th, 49er
2002 – Grimstad, 8th, 49er
2003 – Laredo, 9th, 49er
2004 – Torbole sul Garda, 16th, 49er
2005 – Vallensbæk, 10th, 49er
2006 – Weymouth, 10th, 49er
2007 – Marsala, 13th, 49er (with George Leonchuk)
Other achievements
2000 – Kiel, Kiel Week, (silver) 2nd, 49er
2001 – Medemblik, Spa Regatta, (gold) 1st, 49er
2001 – Kiel, Kiel Week, (silver) 2nd, 49er
2002 – Medemblik, Spa Regatta, (silver) 2nd, 49er
2003 – Hyères, Semaine Olympique Française, (gold) 1st, 49er
2003 – Medemblik, Spa Regatta, (bronze) 3rd, 49er
2005 – Miami, Rolex Miami OCR, (silver) 2nd, 49er
2006 – Miami, Rolex Miami OCR, (bronze) 3rd, 49er
2006 – Miami, North American Championships, (bronze) 3rd, 49er
