= Frode Bovim =

Norwegian sailor

Medal record

Men's sailing

World Championships
Silver medal – second place	2003	49er

Frode Bovim (born 22 August 1977) is a Norwegian sailor.

He received a silver medal in the 49er class at the 2003 world championships, together with Christoffer Sundby. He competed at the 2004 Summer Olympics in Athens together with Christoffer Sundby, where they finished 4th in the 49er class. At the 2008 Summer Olympics in Beijing, he competed in the same class together with Christopher Gundersen.

He was born in Oslo, but represents the club Soon SF. He is married to Ingvill Måkestad Bovim.
