= Max Groy =

German yacht racer

Max Groy (born 10 October 1982) is a German former yacht racer who competed in the 2004 Summer Olympics.
