= Thomas Johanson =

Finnish sailor

Personal information
- Full name: Thomas Mark Mikael Johanson
- Born: 3 June 1969 (age 57) Helsinki, Finland
- Height: 181 cm (5 ft 11 in)
- Weight: 75 kg (165 lb)

Sailing career
- Sport: Sailing
- Class(es): Laser; 49er
Medal record
Sailing
Representing Finland
Olympic Games
Gold medal – first place	2000 Sydney	49er class

Thomas Mark Mikael Johanson (born 3 June 1969 in Helsinki) is a Finnish sailor and Olympic champion. He won a gold medal in the 49er Class with Jyrki Järvi at the 2000 Summer Olympics in Sydney. In 2008–2009, he was a crew member on yacht Ericsson 3 and in 2011–12 on yacht PUMA Ocean Racing in the Volvo Ocean Race.

== Results ==
- 1983 25th, Optimist World Championship. Rio de Janeiro
- 1984 4th, Optimist World Championship. Kingston, Canada
- 1986-1990 Top six in every International Europe dinghy regatta.
- 1991 1st, Open European Championship, Laser class. El Masnou, Spain
- 1992 1st, Open European Championship, Laser class. Mariestad, Sweden
- 1993 1st, World Championship, Laser class. Takapuna, New Zealand
- 1994 4th, World Championship, Laser class. Japan
- 1996 8th, Olympic Games, Laser class. Atlanta
- 1999 3rd, 49er World Championship. Chile
- 2000 1st, Olympic Games, 49er class. Sydney
- 2004 8th, Olympic Games, 49er class. Athens
