= 2014 ISAF Sailing World Championships – Men's 470 =

Men's 470 at the 2014 ISAF Sailing World Championships
- Venue: Santander, Spain
- Dates: 14–20 September
- Competitors: 148 from 30 nations

Medalists
gold medal	Mathew Belcher; Will Ryan	Australia
silver medal	Šime Fantela; Igor Marenić	Croatia
bronze medal	Panagiotis Mantis; Pavlos Kagialis	Greece

The men's 470 class at the 2014 ISAF Sailing World Championships was held in Santander, Spain 14–20 September.

== Results ==
Results of individual races
Pos	Crew	Country	I	II	III	IV	V	VI	VII	VIII	IX	MR	Tot	Pts
Gold medal	Mathew Belcher; Will Ryan	Australia	6^{†}	5	RDG 4.3	2	1	1	1	1	2	8	31.3	25.3
Silver medal	Šime Fantela; Igor Marenić	Croatia	2	8	3	1	9	2	5	2	21^{†}	12	65	44
Bronze medal	Panagiotis Mantis; Pavlos Kagialis	Greece	9	5	1	2	4	15^{†}	3	4	9	10	62	47
4	Luke Patience; Elliot Willis	Great Britain	12	3	6	3	17^{†}	5	7	10	1	4	68	51
5	Stuart McNay; David Hughes	United States	1	1	12	23^{†}	2	8	21	16	7	6	97	74
6	Tetsuya Matsunaga; Yugo Yoshida	Japan	6	4	7	8	3	6	15^{†}	14	8	18	89	74
7	Jordi Xammar; Joan Herp	Spain	15	17	2	3	12	9	26^{†}	19	17	2	122	96
8	Guillaume Pirouelle; Valentin Sipan	France	13	2	6	14	5	7	29	11	32^{†}	14	133	101
9	Kazuto Doi; Kimihiko Imamura	Japan	13	12	5	1	20	34^{†}	10	15	3	OCS 22	135	101
10	Pavel Sozykin; Denis Gribanov	Russia	10	15	8	11	31^{†}	3	13	5	23	16	135	104
11	Sofian Bouvet; Jérémie Mion	France	1	11	RDG 5.3	4	7	16	23	28	29^{†}	–	124.3	95.3
12	Paul Snow-Hansen; Daniel Willcox	New Zealand	14	4	20	15	23^{†}	20	4	8	13	–	121	98
13	Matthias Schmid; Florian Reichstädter	Austria	11	3	22	13	24^{†}	4	12	9	24	–	122	98
14	Yannick Brauchli; Romuald Hausser	Switzerland	21	23	16	5	10	35^{†}	2	18	6	–	136	101
15	Anton Dahlberg; Fredrik Bergström	Sweden	8	9	8	4	11	33	16	13	DSQ 38^{†}	–	140	102
16	Mikhail Sheremetyev; Maksim Sheremetyev	Russia	22	9	9	12	14	30^{†}	6	20	14	–	136	106
17	Ferdinand Gerz; Oliver Szymanski	Germany	10	28^{†}	9	6	15	24	20	17	11	–	140	112
18	Julian Autenrieth; Philipp Autenrieth	Germany	3	26	21	11	16	27^{†}	9	22	5	–	140	113
19	Simon Sivitz Kosuta; Jas Farneti	Italy	26	11	11	7	8	22	30^{†}	3	25	–	143	113
20	Joonas Lindgren; Niklas Lindgren	Finland	5	14	11	18	29^{†}	14	18	24	10	–	143	114
21	Onán Barreiros; Juan Curbelo	Spain	19	1	BFD 38^{†}	10	28	21	17	6	16	–	156	118
22	Alexander Conway; Patrick Conway	Australia	4	10	17	17	22	18	8	29^{†}	22	–	147	118
23	Panagiotis Kampouridis; Efstathios Papadopoulos	Greece	3	16	10	25	RET 38^{†}	31	11	7	18	–	159	121
24	Pierre Leboucher; Nicolas le Berre	France	17	UFD 38^{†}	12	7	18	11	35	23	4	–	165	127
25	Vianney Guilbaud; Mathieu Fountaine	France	18	24	15	9	6	25^{†}	19	25	12	–	153	128
26	Naoki Ichino; Jumpei Hokazono	Japan	24	22	10	9	13	26^{†}	24	12	19	–	159	133
27	Rayco Tabares Alvarez; Alfredo Gonzalez	Spain	16	17	13	8	34^{†}	13	14	32	20	–	167	133
28	Nicolas Charbonnier; Achille Nebout-Javal	France	2	16	4	17	26	23	25	31^{†}	28	–	172	141
29	Carl-Fredrik Fock; Marcus Dackhammar	Sweden	5	6	17	19	32	12	33^{†}	27	27	–	178	145
30	Xu Zangjun; Wang Wei	China	32	18	5	5	25	10	27	33	34^{†}	–	189	155
31	Gil Cohen; Dan Froyliche	Israel	28	7	14	12	30	29	36^{†}	21	15	–	192	156
32	Asenathi Jim; Roger Beresford Hudson	South Africa	4	31	13	13	19	32	22	34^{†}	30	–	198	164
33	Francesco Rebaudi; Matteo Ramian	Italy	25	6	3	25	27	28	28	36^{†}	26	–	204	168
34	Matthew Crawford; Robert Crawford	Australia	34^{†}	10	15	16	21	19	32	26	33	–	206	172
35	Gonçalo Pires; Miguel Nunes	Portugal	32	21	19	6	33	17	31	35^{†}	35	–	229	194
36	Matteo Pilati; Francesco Rubagotti	Italy	35	8	2	27	DNS 38^{†}	36	34	30	31	–	241	203
37	Wuwei Liu; Dongwu Lv	China	11	2	BFD 38^{†}	33	DNF 38	DNF 38	37	37	36	–	270	232
38	Geison Dzioubanov; Gustavo Thiesen	Brazil	29^{†}	14	14	21	7	4	3	16	1	–	109	80
39	Hao Lan; Wang Chao	China	23	DSQ 38^{†}	16	18	6	16	1	2	9	–	129	91
40	Balder Tobiasen; Magnus Jung Johansen	Denmark	31^{†}	30	4	20	1	9	14	14	4	–	127	96
41	David Charles Vila; Alex Charles	Spain	12	20	31^{†}	26	14	2	10	13	13	–	141	110
42	Jacob Saunders; Graeme Saunders	Canada	7	19	26	24	12	7	30^{†}	11	8	–	144	114
43	Jasper Wagner; Dustin Baldewein	Germany	26	20	BFD 38^{†}	DNF 38	4	20	4	1	5	–	156	118
44	Jordan Factor; Matthew Wefer	United States	23	26	24	29^{†}	19	3	17	9	3	–	153	124
45	Francesco Falcetelli; Matteo Bernard	Italy	22	12	20	20	33^{†}	17	18	6	11	–	159	126
46	Hugo Feydit; Charlie Ageneau	France	14	29	18	32^{†}	20	31	2	4	10	–	160	128
47	António Rosa; Ricardo Schedel	Portugal	7	29	BFD 38^{†}	14	9	15	12	5	BFD 38	–	167	129
48	Henrique Haddad; Bruno Amorim	Brazil	24^{†}	22	21	15	24	21	19	3	6	–	155	131
49	Denny Naujock; Paul Kuebel	Germany	18	15	23^{†}	22	23	13	23	10	7	–	154	131
50	Mike Wood; Hugh Brayshaw	Great Britain	31	19	BFD 38^{†}	10	8	1	6	23	BFD 38	–	174	136
51	João Villas-Boas; Francisco Pinheiro de Melo	Portugal	21	DNF 38^{†}	1	26	11	22	20	19	26	–	184	146
52	Corentin Demanet; Quinten Lauwers	Belgium	19	24	DSQ 38^{†}	34	2	18	5	8	DSQ 38	–	186	148
53	Philippe Erni; Stephan Zurfluh	Switzerland	16	27^{†}	25	24	13	11	11	27	22	–	176	149
54	Angus Galloway; Timothy Hannah	Australia	30^{†}	13	24	22	22	28	21	7	17	–	184	154
55	Kristian Chekh; Maksim Cherenkov	Russia	9	27	BFD 38^{†}	30	18	10	9	21	DNF 38	–	200	162
56	Robert Gullan; Sam Brearey	Great Britain	8	32^{†}	22	32	15	23	31	17	15	–	195	163
57	Shibuki Iitsuka; Shinji Hachiyama	Japan	29	31	BFD 38^{†}	16	3	DSQ 38	24	24	2	–	205	167
58	Ben Hazeldine; Rhos Hawes	Great Britain	27	18	BFD 38^{†}	31	30	6	15	22	24	–	211	173
59	Pavel Finaev; Maksim Bialkevich	Belarus	15	33^{†}	23	19	21	27	13	33	27	–	211	178
60	Tiago Matzenbacher Brito; Andrei Segabinazi Kneipp	Brazil	20	BFD 38^{†}	32	27	16	30	27	15	14	–	219	181
61	Stefan Scharnagl; Helmut Schulz	Austria	33	7	34	23	29	8	29	35^{†}	18	–	216	181
62	Tora Sebahattin Kutoglu; Abdullah Bağlıca	Turkey	35	32	27	37	17	5	16	12	BFD 38^{†}	–	219	181
63	Ridgely Balladares; Whok Dimapilis	Philippines	20	23	7	33	34	19	25	36^{†}	23	–	220	184
64	Adolfo Berrocal; Pedro Terrones	Spain	30	25	30	28	26	12	36^{†}	28	20	–	235	199
65	Emanuele Savoini; Enzio Savoini	Italy	27	13	DNE 38	29	5	DSQ 38^{†}	32	18	BFD 38	–	238	200
66	Borys Shvets; Pavlo Matsuyev	Ukraine	25	BFD 38^{†}	28	21	25	26	22	20	BFD 38	–	243	205
67	Domen Vasič-Stepančič; Jakob Božič	Slovenia	37	UFD 38^{†}	BFD 38	36	27	14	8	30	16	–	244	206
68	Nahuel Rodriguez; Nicolás Rodríguez	Spain	28	35	29	DNF 38^{†}	10	29	26	29	21	–	245	207
69	Diogo Pereira; Manuel Macedo	Portugal	34	25	BFD 38^{†}	DNF 38	32	24	7	34	28	–	260	222
70	Okko Konttinen; Zacharias Still	Finland	33	28	BFD 38^{†}	28	28	32	35	32	12	–	266	228
71	João Vasconcelos; Tomas Marques	Portugal	36	30	18	35	UFD 38^{†}	RET 38	28	26	19	–	268	230
72	David Bargehr; Lukas Mähr	Austria	17	21	19	DNF 38^{†}	DNF 38	DNF 38	DNF 38	DNF 38	DNF 38	–	285	247
73	Miikka Nikkilä; Leo Tykkyläinen	Finland	37	33	33	31	UFD 38^{†}	25	33	31	25	–	286	248
74	Matias Montinho; Paixão Afonso	Angola	36	34	RET 38^{†}	30	31	33	34	25	BFD 38	–	299	261

Scoring system: low-point system; Source:
Legend: – Qualified for medal race(s); BFD – Black flag disqualification; DNF – Did not finish; DNS – Did not start; DSQ – Disqualified; OCS – On the course side of the starting line; RDG – Redress given; RET – Retired; UFD – "U" flag disqualification; † – Discarded race not counted in the overall result;
