= 2018 Asian Sailing Championship =

Event title
- Edition: 17th

Event details
- Venue: Jakarta, Indonesia
- Dates: 24–30 June
- Titles: 12

The 2018 Asian Sailing Championship will be held in Jakarta, Indonesia 24–30 June.

== Summary ==
=== Medal table ===
* Host nation (Host nation)

Rank	Nation	Gold	Silver	Bronze	Total
1	Indonesia (INA)*	0	0	0	0
Totals (1 entries)		0	0	0	0

=== Event medalists ===
==== Senior events ====
Event	Gold	Silver	Bronze
Men's 470	China; Xu Zangjun; Chao Wang	Japan; Tetsuya Isozaki; Akira Takayanagi	South Korea; Kim Chang-ju; Kim Ji-hoon
Women's 470	Japan; Ai Konoda Yoshida; Miho Yoshioka	China; Mengxi Wei; Haiyan Gao	Malaysia; Nuraisyah Jamil; Norasihkin Mohamad Sayed
49er			
49er FX			
Laser			
Laser Radial			
Men's RS:X			
Women's RS:X			

==== Youth events ====
Event	Gold	Silver	Bronze
Laser 4.7			
Boys' Optimist			
Girls' Optimist			
Mixed RS:One Team Racing			
