= Sailing at the 2018 Asian Games – Men's 470 =

Men's 470 at the 2018 Asian Games
- Venue: Ancol Beach Marina
- Date: 24–31 August 2018
- Competitors: 22 from 11 nations

Medalists
gold medal	Tetsuya Isozaki; Akira Takayanagi	Japan
silver medal	Wang Chao; Xu Zangjun	China
bronze medal	Navee Thamsoontorn; Nut Butmarasri	Thailand

The men's 470 competition at the 2018 Asian Games was held from 24 to 31 August 2018.

== Schedule ==
All times are Western Indonesia Time (UTC+07:00)

Date	Time	Event
Friday, 24 August 2018	11:05	Race 1
Friday, 24 August 2018	12:05	Race 2
Saturday, 25 August 2018	12:05	Race 3
Saturday, 25 August 2018	13:22	Race 4
Saturday, 25 August 2018	14:40	Race 5
Sunday, 26 August 2018	12:05	Race 6
Sunday, 26 August 2018	13:15	Race 7
Tuesday, 28 August 2018	12:13	Race 8
Tuesday, 28 August 2018	13:00	Race 9
Wednesday, 29 August 2018	12:00	Race 10
Wednesday, 29 August 2018	14:05	Race 11
Friday, 31 August 2018	14:00	Race 12

== Results ==
Legend

- BFD — Black flag disqualification
- DNS — Did not start
- DSQ — Disqualification

Rank	Team	Race												Total
Rank	Team	1	2	3	4	5	6	7	8	9	10	11	12	Total
1st place, gold medalist(s)	Japan (JPN); Tetsuya Isozaki; Akira Takayanagi	1	2	1	1	1	2	1	1	1	4	~~(12)~~; DSQ	2	17
2nd place, silver medalist(s)	China (CHN); Wang Chao; Xu Zangjun	2	1	2	2	2	3	3	2	2	2	~~(4)~~	1	22
3rd place, bronze medalist(s)	Thailand (THA); Navee Thamsoontorn; Nut Butmarasri	5	5	3	5	4	6	5	4	3	1	1	~~(7)~~	42
4	South Korea (KOR); Kim Chang-ju; Kim Ji-hoon	3	3	5	3	3	1	2	~~(12)~~; BFD	7	6	7	3	43
5	Malaysia (MAS); Faizal Norizan; Ahmad Syukri Abdul Aziz	4	4	4	4	5	4	6	~~(12)~~; BFD	5	5	2	4	47
6	Philippines (PHI); Lester Tayong; Emerson Villena	6	6	~~(7)~~	6	7	5	4	3	4	3	3	6	53
7	Hong Kong (HKG); Tse Sui Lun; Bernard Kay	~~(8)~~	8	6	8	6	7	7	6	6	7	6	8	75
8	Singapore (SGP); Daniel Toh; Xavier Ng	7	7	8	7	8	~~(9)~~	8	5	8	8	5	5	76
9	Pakistan (PAK); Khalid Hussain; Rehman Ullah	~~(10)~~	9	9	10	9	8	9	7	9	10	9	9	98
10	Indonesia (INA); Bobby Feri Andriyanto; Nugie Triwira	9	~~(10)~~	10	9	10	10	10	8	10	9	8	10	103
11	Kazakhstan (KAZ); Berik Kubayev; Yevgeniy Yugay	~~(12)~~; DNS	11	11	11	11	11	11	9	11	11	10	11	118
