= Sailing at the 2016 Summer Olympics – Men's 470 =

Men's 470 at the Games of the XXXI Olympiad
- Line drawing of the 470
- Venue: Marina da Glória
- Dates: 10–17 August
- Competitors: 52 from 26 nations
- Winning total: 43 points

Medalists
1st place, gold medalist(s)		Šime Fantela; Igor Marenić	Croatia
2nd place, silver medalist(s)		Mathew Belcher; Will Ryan	Australia
3rd place, bronze medalist(s)		Panagiotis Mantis; Pavlos Kagialis	Greece

The Men's 470 was a sailing event on the Sailing at the 2016 Summer Olympics program in Rio de Janeiro, in the 470 dinghy. It took place between 10 and 17 August at Marina da Glória. 11 races (the last one a medal race) were held.

The medals were presented by Barry Maister, IOC member, New Zealand and Carlo Croce, President of World Sailing.

== Schedule ==
Wed 10 Aug	Thu 11 Aug	Fri 12 Aug	Sat 13 Aug	Sun 14 Aug	Mon 15 Aug	Tue 16 Aug	Wed 17 Aug
Race 1 Race 2	Race 3 Race 4	Race 5 Race 6	Rest day	Race 7 Race 8	Race 9 Race 10	Rest day	Medal race

== Results ==
Results of individual races
Pos	Crew	Country	I	II	III	IV	V	VI	VII	VIII	IX	X	MR	Tot	Pts
Gold medal	Šime Fantela; Igor Marenić	Croatia	1	2	4	1	3	3	4	8^{†}	6	3	16	51.0	43.0
Silver medal	Mathew Belcher; Will Ryan	Australia	8	1	3	3	2	8	10^{†}	7	1	7	18	68.0	58.0
Bronze medal	Panagiotis Mantis; Pavlos Kagialis	Greece	9	3	1	5	13^{†}	9	5	2	2	2	20	71.0	58.0
4	Stuart McNay; David Hughes	United States	10	7	8	13	4	7	6	1	11	14^{†}	4	85.0	71.0
5	Luke Patience; Chris Grube	Great Britain	21	5	5	6	1	UFD 27^{†}	20	4	3	4	6	102.0	75.0
6	Anton Dahlberg; Fredrik Bergström	Sweden	22	8	2	4	8	UFD 27^{†}	1	5	8	11	10	106.0	79.0
7	Sofian Bouvet; Jérémie Mion	France	6	6	10	2	6	6	14	9	20	22^{†}	8	109.0	87.0
8	Matthias Schmid; Florian Reichstädter	Austria	3	9	6	9	16	2	13	14	17^{†}	1	14	104.0	87.0
9	Yannick Brauchli; Romuald Hausser	Switzerland	11	4	19	7	10	10	8	22^{†}	15	8	2	116.0	94.0
10	Paul Snow-Hansen; Daniel Willcox	New Zealand	2	10	20	15	23^{†}	5	2	13	10	15	12	127.0	104.0
11	Ferdinand Gerz; Oliver Szymanski	Germany	13	18	9	23	14	1	24^{†}	6	4	6		118.0	94.0
12	Jordi Xammar; Joan Herp	Spain	4	16	14	10	9	22^{†}	7	16	12	9		119.0	97.0
13	Pavel Sozykin; Denis Gribanov	Russia	12	17	7	25^{†}	5	21	18	3	16	18		142.0	117.0
14	Deniz Çınar; Ateş Çınar	Turkey	14	19	8	12	7	15	12	18	21^{†}	5		141.0	120.0
15	Joonas Lindgren; Niklas Lindgren	Finland	20	11	23	18	24^{†}	19	3	10	9	10		147.0	123.0
16	Lucas Calabrese; Juan de la Fuente	Argentina	17	14	11	11	17^{†}	12	15	17	5	DNE 27		146.0	129.0
17	Kazuto Doi; Kimihiko Imamura	Japan	15	21	16	16	15	16	22^{†}	12	7	17		157.0	135.0
18	Wang Wei; Xu Zangjun	China	23^{†}	12	13	22	19	11	19	15	19	12		165.0	142.0
19	Kim Chang-ju; Kim Ji-hoon	South Korea	5	25^{†}	5	8	20	13	21	23	24	20		171.0	146.0
20	Asenathi Jim; Roger Hudson	South Africa	18	24^{†}	15	14	11	18	11	20	18	23		172.0	148.0
21	Eyal Levin; Dan Froyliche	Israel	7	15	17	21	21	20	16	19	22^{†}	16		174.0	152.0
22	Jacob Saunders; Graeme Saunders	Canada	26^{†}	20	22	19	12	14	17	21	13	21		185.0	159.0
23	Henrique Haddad; Bruno Bethlem	Brazil	19	23	25	17	22	UFD 27^{†}	9	11	14	DSQ 27		194.0	167.0
24	Andres Ducasse; Francisco Ducasse	Chile	24	22	24	20	18	4	23	25^{†}	23	12		196.0	171.0
25	Borys Shvets; Pavlo Matsuyev	Ukraine	16	13	21	24	25^{†}	17	25	24	25	19		209.0	184.0
26	Matias Montinho; Paixão Afonso	Angola	25	26	DNF 27^{†}	DNF 27	26	23	26	26	26	24		256.0	229.0

Scoring system: low-point system;
Legend: – Qualified for medal race(s); DNE – Non excludable disqualification; DNF – Did not finish; DSQ – Disqualified; UFD – "U" flag disqualification; † – Discarded race not counted in the overall result;
