= Sailing at the 2026 Asian Games – 470 =

470 at the 2026 Asian Games
- Venue: Kaiyoh Yacht Harbor
- Date: 26 September – 2 October 2026
- Competitors: 18 from 9 nations

Medalists
gold medal	Tetsuya Isozaki; Yurie Seki	Japan
silver medal	Kim Chang-ju; Lee Gyeong-jin	South Korea
bronze medal	Dong Wenju; Xiao Hailun	China

The mixed 470 competition at the 2026 Asian Games was held from 26 September – 2 October 2026 at Kaiyoh Yacht Harbor in Gamagōri, Aichi, Japan.

Tetsuya Isozaki and Yurie Seki won the gold medal, Kim Chang-ju and Lee Gyeong-jin took silver and Dong Wenju and Xiao Hailun bronze.

== Schedule ==
All times are Japan Standard Time (UTC+09:00).

Date	Time	Event
Saturday, 26 September 2026	13:00	Race 1–2
Monday, 28 September 2026	12:00	Race 3–5
Thursday, 1 October 2026	11:00	Race 6–8
Friday, 2 October 2026	10:30	Race 9–10

== Results ==
Legend

- DSQ — Disqualification
- DNC — Did not come to the starting area
- RET — Retired
- UFD — U flag disqualification

Rank	Team	Race										Total	Net
Rank	Team	1	2	3	4	5	6	7	8	9	10	Total	Net
1st place, gold medalist(s)	Japan (JPN); Tetsuya Isozaki; Yurie Seki	1	1	~~(3)~~	2	1	1	3	3	1	2	18	15
2nd place, silver medalist(s)	South Korea (KOR); Kim Chang-ju; Lee Gyeong-jin	3	3	1	~~(5)~~	2	3	2	2	3	1	25	20
3rd place, bronze medalist(s)	China (CHN); Dong Wenju; Xiao Hailun	~~(10)~~; DSQ	4	6	3	7	2	1	1	2	3	39	29
4	Thailand (THA); Navee Thamsoontorn; Nichapa Waiwai	2	2	~~(7)~~	1	3	5	4	4	4	6	38	31
5	Malaysia (MAS); Muhammad Fauzi Kaman Shah; Juni Karimah Noor Jamali	5	6	2	~~(7)~~	5	4	7	5	5	4	50	43
6	Philippines (PHI); Edgar Villapana; Coleen Jem Ferrer	4	7	4	~~(8)~~	4	7	5	7	7	7	60	52
7	India (IND); Shraddha Verma; Ravindra Kumar Sharma	~~(10)~~; DSQ	5	8	4	6	6	6	6	10; RET	5	66	56
8	Pakistan (PAK); Nadine Xerxes Avari; Mehboob	6	8	5	6	8	8	~~(10)~~; UFD	8	6	8	73	63
9	Kazakhstan (KAZ); Yerkebulan Sardarbekov; Tursynay Ashirbay	7	9	9	9	9	9	8	~~(10)~~; UFD	8	10; DNC	88	78
