= Sailing at the 2014 Asian Games =

- Venue: Wangsan Marina
- Dates: 24 September – 1 October 2014
- Competitors: 177 from 20 nations

Sailing at the 2014 Asian Games was held at Wangsan Sailing Marina in Incheon, South Korea from September 24 to 1 October 2014.

== Schedule ==
●	Round	●	Last round	P	Preliminary	F	Finals

Event↓/Date →	24th Wed	25th Thu	26th Fri	27th Sat	28th Sun	29th Mon	30th Tue	1st Wed
Men's Mistral	●●●	●●●	●●	●●			●●	
Men's RS:X	●●●	●●●	●●	●●			●●	
Men's Laser	●●●	●●	●●●	●●			●●	
Boys' Optimist	●●●●	●●	●●	●●			●●	
Boys' 420	●●●●	●	●●●	●●			●●	
Men's 470	●●●●	●	●●●	●●			●●	
Women's RS:One	●●●	●●●	●●	●●			●●	
Women's RS:X	●●●	●●●	●●	●●			●●	
Women's Laser Radial	●●●	●	●●●●	●●			●●	
Girls' Optimist	●●●●	●●	●●	●●			●●	
Girls' 420	●●●●	●	●●●	●●			●●	
Women's 29er	●●●●	●●	●●	●●			●●	
Open Hobie 16	●●●	●●●	●●	●●			●●	
Open match racing				P	P	P	P	F

== Medalists ==
=== Men ===
Event	Gold	Silver	Bronze
Mistral	Cheng Kwok Fai; Hong Kong	Natthaphong Phonoppharat; Thailand	Shi Chuankun; China
RS:X	Wang Aichen; China	Andy Leung; Hong Kong	Ek Boonsawad; Thailand
Laser	Ha Jee-min; South Korea	Khairulnizam Afendy; Malaysia	Colin Cheng; Singapore
Optimist	Park Sung-bin; South Korea	Raynn Kwok; Singapore	Suthon Yampinid; Thailand
420	Malaysia; Faizal Norizan; Ahmad Syukri Abdul Aziz	Japan; Ibuki Koizumi; Kotaro Matsuo	Singapore; Loh Jia Yi; Jonathan Yeo
470	South Korea; Kim Chang-ju; Kim Ji-hoon	Japan; Kazuto Doi; Kimihiko Imamura	China; Lan Hao; Wang Chao

=== Women ===
Event	Gold	Silver	Bronze
RS:One	Weng Qiaoshan; China	Sonia Lo; Hong Kong	Siripon Kaewduang-ngam; Thailand
RS:X	Hayley Chan; Hong Kong	Sun Jiali; China	Sarocha Prumprai; Thailand
Laser Radial	Zhang Dongshuang; China	Manami Doi; Japan	Kamolwan Chanyim; Thailand
Optimist	Jodie Lai; Singapore	Yu Huijia; China	Kamonchanok Klahan; Thailand
420	Singapore; Kimberly Lim; Savannah Siew	Malaysia; Nuraisyah Jamil; Umi Norwahida Sallahuddin	South Korea; Lee Na-kyung; Choi Seo-eun
29er	Thailand; Noppakao Poonpat; Nichapa Waiwai	Singapore; Priscilla Low; Cecilia Low	India; Varsha Gautham; Aishwarya Nedunchezhiyan

=== Open ===
Event	Gold	Silver	Bronze
Hobie 16	South Korea; Kim Keun-soo; Song Min-jae	Thailand; Damrongsak Vongtim; Kitsada Vongtim	Hong Kong; Tong Yui Shing; Tong Kit Fong
Match racing	Singapore; Maximilian Soh; Justin Wong; Andrew Paul Chan; Russell Kan; Christopher Lim	South Korea; Park Gun-woo; Cho Sung-min; Kim Sung-wok; Yang Ho-yeob; Chae Bong-jin	Japan; Wataru Sakamoto; Daichi Wada; Nobuyuki Imai; Yasuhiro Okamoto

== Medal table ==
Rank	Nation	Gold	Silver	Bronze	Total
1	South Korea (KOR)	4	1	1	6
2	China (CHN)	3	2	2	7
2	Singapore (SIN)	3	2	2	7
4	Hong Kong (HKG)	2	2	1	5
5	Thailand (THA)	1	2	6	9
6	Malaysia (MAS)	1	2	0	3
7	Japan (JPN)	0	3	1	4
8	India (IND)	0	0	1	1
Totals (8 entries)		14	14	14	42

== Participating nations ==
A total of 177 athletes from 20 nations competed in sailing at the 2014 Asian Games:

- Bahrain (5)
- China (19)
- Chinese Taipei (9)
- Hong Kong (13)
- India (15)
- Indonesia (2)
- Iran (1)
- Japan (12)
- Kazakhstan (4)
- Kuwait (2)
- Malaysia (17)
- Oman (6)
- Philippines (4)
- Qatar (6)
- Saudi Arabia (2)
- Singapore (17)
- South Korea (23)
- Sri Lanka (1)
- Thailand (16)
- United Arab Emirates (3)
