= Greece at the 2016 Summer Olympics =

- IOC code: GRE
- NOC: Hellenic Olympic Committee
- Website: www.hoc.gr (in Greek and English)

in Rio de Janeiro, Brazil 5 August 2016 – 21 August 2016
- Competitors: 93 (56 men and 37 women) in 15 sports
- Flag bearer (opening): Sofia Bekatorou
- Flag bearer (closing): Katerina Stefanidi
- Medals Ranked 26th: Gold 3 Silver 1 Bronze 2 Total 6

Summer Olympics appearances (overview)
- 1896; 1900; 1904; 1908; 1912; 1920; 1924; 1928; 1932; 1936; 1948; 1952; 1956; 1960; 1964; 1968; 1972; 1976; 1980; 1984; 1988; 1992; 1996; 2000; 2004; 2008; 2012; 2016; 2020; 2024; 2028

Other related appearances
- 1906 Intercalated Games

Greece competed at the 2016 Summer Olympics in Rio de Janeiro, Brazil, from 5 to 21 August 2016. Greek athletes have competed in every Summer Olympic Games of the modern era, alongside Australia, France, Great Britain, and Switzerland. As the progenitor nation of the Olympic Games and in keeping with tradition, Greece entered first at the Maracanã Stadium during the opening ceremony.

The Hellenic Olympic Committee confirmed a roster of 93 athletes, 56 men and 37 women, to compete across 15 sports at the Games, the smallest in Summer Olympic history since 1992. Aquatic sports constituted the largest number of athletes on the Greek team, with a combined total of 29 entries (14 in swimming, 2 in synchronized swimming, and 13 in men's water polo). There was a single competitor each in archery, road cycling, track cycling, mountain biking, table tennis, weightlifting, and wrestling.

The Greek roster featured 36 returning Olympians, with archer Evangelia Psarra (the oldest member of the team, aged 42) and long-distance swimmer and double world open water champion Spyridon Gianniotis headed to their fifth consecutive Games as the most experienced competitors. Five Greek athletes vied for their fourth Olympic appearance, including table tennis player Panagiotis Gionis, gymnast Vlasios Maras, and judo legend Ilias Iliadis (all of whom started as members of the host nation team in Athens 2004). Sailor and two-time medalist Sofia Bekatorou, who raced alongside her partner Michail Pateniotis in the Nacra 17 class, created Summer Olympic history as the nation's first ever female flag bearer in the opening ceremony.

Greece returned home from Rio de Janeiro with six medals (three gold, one silver, and two bronze), a vast improvement on the nation's overall medal tally from the 2012 Summer Olympics in London. Anna Korakaki accomplished a historic feat as the first Greek athlete to earn multiple medals at a single Olympics since 1912, with a gold and a bronze in women's pistol shooting. The gold medal was the first one for Greece after a 12-year drought. Two other golds were awarded to gymnast Eleftherios Petrounias in the men's rings, and pole vaulter Ekaterini Stefanidi, the first for Greece in the track and field after 12 years. Gianniotis enjoyed the final race of his swimming career with a runner-up finish in the open water marathon, while Panagiotis Mantis and Pavlos Kagialis handed the Greeks their eighth Olympic medal in sailing, obtaining the bronze in the men's 470 class.

== Medalists ==
Medal	Name	Sport	Event	Date
Gold	Anna Korakaki	Shooting	Women's 25 m pistol	9 August
Gold	Eleftherios Petrounias	Gymnastics	Men's rings	15 August
Gold	Ekaterini Stefanidi	Athletics	Women's pole vault	19 August
Silver	Spyridon Gianniotis	Swimming	Men's 10 km open water	16 August
Bronze	Anna Korakaki	Shooting	Women's 10 m air pistol	7 August
Bronze	Pavlos Kagialis; Panagiotis Mantis	Sailing	Men's 470	18 August

Multiple medalists
Name	Sport	1st place, gold medalist(s)	2nd place, silver medalist(s)	3rd place, bronze medalist(s)	Total
Anna Korakaki	Shooting	1	0	1	2

Medals by sport
Sport	1st place, gold medalist(s)	2nd place, silver medalist(s)	3rd place, bronze medalist(s)	Total
Shooting	1	0	1	2
Gymnastics	1	0	0	1
Athletics	1	0	0	1
Swimming	0	1	0	1
Sailing	0	0	1	1
Total	3	1	2	6

Medals by gender
Gender	1st place, gold medalist(s)	2nd place, silver medalist(s)	3rd place, bronze medalist(s)	Total
Male	1	1	1	3
Female	2	0	1	3
Total	3	1	2	6

Medals by date
Day	Date	1st place, gold medalist(s)	2nd place, silver medalist(s)	3rd place, bronze medalist(s)	Total
Day 1	6 August	0	0	0	0
Day 2	7 August	0	0	1	1
Day 3	8 August	0	0	0	0
Day 4	9 August	1	0	0	1
Day 5	10 August	0	0	0	0
Day 6	11 August	0	0	0	0
Day 7	12 August	0	0	0	0
Day 8	13 August	0	0	0	0
Day 9	14 August	0	0	0	0
Day 10	15 August	1	0	0	1
Day 11	16 August	0	1	0	1
Day 12	17 August	0	0	0	0
Day 13	18 August	0	0	1	1
Day 14	19 August	1	0	0	1
Day 15	20 August	0	0	0	0
Day 16	21 August	0	0	0	0
Total		3	1	2	6

== Competitors ==
The following is the list of number of competitors participating in the Games and selected biographies.

Sport	Men	Women	Total
Archery	0	1	1
Athletics	10	15	25
Cycling	3	0	3
Fencing	0	2	2
Gymnastics	2	7	9
Judo	2	0	2
Rowing	8	2	10
Sailing	5	2	7
Shooting	1	1	2
Swimming	10	4	14
Synchronized swimming	0	2	2
Table tennis	1	0	1
Water polo	13	0	13
Weightlifting	1	0	1
Wrestling	0	1	1
Total	56	37	93

== Archery ==
Greece has received a spare Olympic berth freed up by Ivory Coast to send a female archer to the Olympics, as the Ivorian National Olympic Committee decided to withdraw its entry after the deadline. The berth was officially awarded to four-time Olympian Evangelia Psarra.

Athlete	Event	Ranking round		Round of 64	Round of 32	Round of 16	Quarterfinals	Semifinals	Final / BM	
Athlete	Event	Score	Seed	Opposition Score	Opposition Score	Opposition Score	Opposition Score	Opposition Score	Opposition Score	Rank
Evangelia Psarra	Women's individual	596	55	Kawanaka (JPN); L 3–7	Did not advance					

== Athletics ==
Greek athletes have so far achieved qualifying standards in the following athletics events (up to a maximum of 3 athletes in each event):

Key

- Note–Ranks given for track events are within the athlete's heat only
- Q = Qualified for the next round
- q = Qualified for the next round as a fastest loser or, in field events, by position without achieving the qualifying target
- NR = National record
- N/A = Round not applicable for the event
- Bye = Athlete not required to compete in round

Track & road events
Men

Athlete	Event	Heat		Semifinal		Final	
Athlete	Event	Result	Rank	Result	Rank	Result	Rank
Lykourgos-Stefanos Tsakonas	200 m	20.31	3 q	20.63	7	Did not advance	
Konstantinos Douvalidis	110 m hurdles	13.41	1 Q	13.47	5	Did not advance	
Michail Kalomiris	Marathon	—N/a				2:37:03	132
Christoforos Merousis	Marathon	—N/a				2:29:39	116
Alexandros Papamichail	20 km walk	—N/a				1:21:55	20
Alexandros Papamichail	50 km walk	—N/a				3:59:21	28

Women

Athlete	Event	Heat		Semifinal		Final	
Athlete	Event	Result	Rank	Result	Rank	Result	Rank
Maria Belimpasaki	200 m	23.19	4	Did not advance			
Irini Vasiliou	400 m	54.37	7	Did not advance			
Alexi Pappas	10000 m	—N/a				31:36.16 NR	17
Elisavet Pesiridou	100 m hurdles	13.10	7	Did not advance			
Ourania Rebouli	Marathon	—N/a				2:46:32	88
Sofia Riga	Marathon	—N/a				2:49:07	103
Panagiota Vlachaki	Marathon	—N/a				2:59:12	118
Antigoni Drisbioti	20 km walk	—N/a				1:32:32	15
Panagiota Tsinopoulou	20 km walk	—N/a				1:38:24	47

Field events
Men

Athlete	Event	Qualification		Final	
Athlete	Event	Distance	Position	Distance	Position
Miltiadis Tentoglou	Long jump	7.64	27	Did not advance	
Konstadinos Baniotis	High jump	2.22	34	Did not advance	
Konstantinos Filippidis	Pole vault	5.70	2 q	5.50	7
Nicholas Scarvelis	Shot put	19.37	27	Did not advance	
Michail Anastasakis	Hammer throw	71.28	20	Did not advance	

Women

Athlete	Event	Qualification		Final	
Athlete	Event	Distance	Position	Distance	Position
Haido Alexouli	Long jump	6.13	32	Did not advance	
Paraskevi Papachristou	Triple jump	14.43	2 Q	14.26	8
Nikoleta Kyriakopoulou	Pole vault	DNS		Did not advance	
Ekaterini Stefanidi	Pole vault	4.60	1 Q	4.85	1st place, gold medalist(s)
Chrysoula Anagnostopoulou	Discus throw	54.84	26	Did not advance	

Combined events – Women's heptathlon

Athlete	Event	100H	HJ	SP	200 m	LJ	JT	800 m	Final	Rank
Sofia Yfantidou	Result	13.99	1.65	12.97	26.32	5.51	54.57	2:30.08	5613	27
Sofia Yfantidou	Points	980	795	725	769	703	949	692	5613	27

== Cycling ==
=== Road ===
Greece has qualified one rider in the men's Olympic road race by virtue of his top 200 individual ranking in the 2015 UCI Europe Tour.

Athlete	Event	Time	Rank
Ioannis Tamouridis	Men's road race	6:30:05	51

=== Track ===
Following the completion of the 2016 UCI Track Cycling World Championships, Greece has entered one rider to compete in the men's keirin at the Olympics, by virtue of his final individual UCI Olympic ranking in that event.

Keirin

Athlete	Event	1st Round	Repechage	2nd Round	Final
Athlete	Event	Rank	Rank	Rank	Rank
Christos Volikakis	Men's keirin	4 R	1 Q	5 FB	12

=== Mountain biking ===
Greece has qualified one mountain biker for the men's Olympic cross-country race, as a result of his nation's twenty-first-place finish in the UCI Olympic Ranking List of May 25, 2016.

Athlete	Event	Time	Rank
Dimitrios Antoniadis	Men's cross-country	1:44:17	31

== Fencing ==
Greece has entered one fencer into the Olympic competition. 2012 Olympian Vassiliki Vougiouka claimed a spot in the women's sabre as one of the two highest-ranked fencers coming from the Europe zone in the FIE Adjusted Official Rankings. Meanwhile, Aikaterini Kontochristopoulou rounded out the Greek roster by finishing among the top four individual fencers in the women's foil at the European Zonal Qualifier in Prague, Czech Republic.

Athlete	Event	Round of 64	Round of 32	Round of 16	Quarterfinal	Semifinal	Final / BM	
Athlete	Event	Opposition Score	Opposition Score	Opposition Score	Opposition Score	Opposition Score	Opposition Score	Rank
Aikaterini-Maria Kontochristopoulou	Women's foil	Đỗ T A (VIE); L 13–15	Did not advance					
Vassiliki Vougiouka	Women's sabre	Bye	Wozniak (USA); W 15–8	Egorian (RUS); L 11–15	Did not advance			

== Gymnastics ==
=== Artistic ===
Greece has entered two artistic gymnasts into the Olympic competition. Eleftherios Petrounias won the gold medal in the men's rings to book his Olympic spot at the 2015 World Championships in Glasgow, Scotland, and was later joined by three-time Olympian Vlasios Maras and Vasiliki Millousi, who both claimed the men's and women's individual all-around spot, respectively at the Olympic Test Event in Rio de Janeiro.

Men

Athlete	Event	Qualification								Final							
Athlete	Event	Apparatus						Total	Rank	Apparatus						Total	Rank
Athlete	Event	F	PH	R	V	PB	HB	Total	Rank	F	PH	R	V	PB	HB	Total	Rank
Eleftherios Petrounias	Rings	—N/a		15.833	—N/a			15.833	2 Q	—N/a		16.000	—N/a			16.000	1st place, gold medalist(s)
Vlasios Maras	Horizontal bar	—N/a					14.200	14.200	38	Did not advance							

Women

Athlete	Event	Qualification						Final					
Athlete	Event	Apparatus				Total	Rank	Apparatus				Total	Rank
Athlete	Event	V	UB	BB	F	Total	Rank	V	UB	BB	F	Total	Rank
Vasiliki Millousi	Balance beam	—N/a		13.200	—N/a	13.200	57	Did not advance					

=== Rhythmic ===
Greece has qualified one rhythmic gymnast for the individual all-around by finishing in the top 15 at the 2015 World Championships in Stuttgart, Germany. A team of five rhythmic gymnasts were added to the Greek roster by claiming one of the three available Olympic spots in the group all-around at the Olympic Test Event in Rio de Janeiro.

Athlete	Event	Qualification						Final					
Athlete	Event	Hoop	Ball	Clubs	Ribbon	Total	Rank	Hoop	Ball	Clubs	Ribbon	Total	Rank
Varvara Filiou	Individual	17.208	17.333	17.333	16.750	68.624	15	Did not advance					

Athlete	Event	Qualification				Final			
Athlete	Event	5 ribbons	3 clubs 2 hoops	Total	Rank	5 ribbons	3 clubs 2 hoops	Total	Rank
Ioanna Anagnostopoulou; Eleni Doika; Zoi Kontogianni; Michaela Metallidou; Stavroula Samara	Team	15.000	15.416	30.416	13	Did not advance			

== Judo ==
Greece has qualified two judokas for each of the following weight classes at the Games. Roman Moustopoulos and double Olympic medalist Ilias Iliadis were ranked among the top 22 eligible judokas for men in the IJF World Ranking List of May 30, 2016.

Athlete	Event	Round of 64	Round of 32	Round of 16	Quarterfinals	Semifinals	Repechage	Final / BM	
Athlete	Event	Opposition Result	Opposition Result	Opposition Result	Opposition Result	Opposition Result	Opposition Result	Opposition Result	Rank
Roman Moustopoulos	Men's −81 kg	Bye	Turcios (ESA); L 000–100	Did not advance					
Ilias Iliadis	Men's −90 kg	Bye	Cheng Xz (CHN); L 000–100	Did not advance					

== Rowing ==
Greece has qualified two boats for each of the following rowing classes into the Olympic regatta. Rowers competing in the men's four and women's single sculls confirmed Olympic places for their boats at the 2015 FISA World Championships in Lac d'Aiguebelette, France.

On July 26, 2016, the men's lightweight four berth was awarded to the Greek rowing team, as a response to the removal of four boats held by the Russians from FISA due to their previous doping bans and their implications in the "disappearing positive methodology" set out in the McClaren Report on Russia's state-sponsored doping.

Men

Athlete	Event	Heats		Repechage		Semifinals		Final	
Athlete	Event	Time	Rank	Time	Rank	Time	Rank	Time	Rank
Dionisis Angelopoulos; Ioannis Christou; Ioannis Tsilis; Georgios Tziallas	Four	5:59.65	2 SA/B	Bye		6:24.04	5 FB	6:00.56	8
Spyridon Giannaros; Panagiotis Magdanis; Stefanos Ntouskos; Ioannis Petrou	Lightweight four	6:05.27	3 SA/B	Bye		6:23.95	3 FA	6:36.47	6

Women

Athlete	Event	Heats		Repechage		Semifinals		Final	
Athlete	Event	Time	Rank	Time	Rank	Time	Rank	Time	Rank
Sofia Asoumanaki; Aikaterini Nikolaidou	Double sculls	7:20.64	3 SA/B	Bye		6:51.99	1 FA	7:48.62	4

Qualification Legend: FA=Final A (medal); FB=Final B (non-medal); FC=Final C (non-medal); FD=Final D (non-medal); FE=Final E (non-medal); FF=Final F (non-medal); SA/B=Semifinals A/B; SC/D=Semifinals C/D; SE/F=Semifinals E/F; QF=Quarterfinals; R=Repechage

== Sailing ==
Greek sailors have qualified one boat in each of the following classes through the 2014 ISAF Sailing World Championships, the individual fleet Worlds, and European qualifying regattas. The majority of the sailing crews, led by London 2012 fourth-place finalist Byron Kokkalanis (RS:X) and Beijing 2008 bronze medalist Sofia Bekatorou, along with her new partner Michail Pateniotis (Nacra 17), were named to the Greek team, following the completion of the Princess Sofia Trophy regatta. Meanwhile, London 2012 Olympian Ioannis Mitakis rounded out the Greek selection at the 2016 Finn Gold Cup.

Men

Athlete	Event	Race													Net points	Final rank
Athlete	Event	1	2	3	4	5	6	7	8	9	10	11	12	M*	Net points	Final rank
Byron Kokkalanis	RS:X	2	2	6	~~13~~	5	5	5	8	12	12	11	10	18	96	5
Ioannis Mitakis	Finn	12	~~24~~	3	2	13	12	21	9	13	3	—N/a		EL	88	11
Pavlos Kagialis; Panagiotis Mantis	470	9	3	1	5	~~13~~	9	5	2	2	2	—N/a		20	58	3rd place, bronze medalist(s)

Women

Athlete	Event	Race													Net points	Final rank
Athlete	Event	1	2	3	4	5	6	7	8	9	10	11	12	M*	Net points	Final rank
Angeliki Skarlatou	RS:X	16	17	7	12	17	15	~~27~~	20	16	15	20	16	EL	171	19

Mixed

Athlete	Event	Race													Net points	Final rank
Athlete	Event	1	2	3	4	5	6	7	8	9	10	11	12	M*	Net points	Final rank
Michail Pateniotis; Sofia Bekatorou	Nacra 17	~~21~~	21	16	4	6	11	3	15	14	18	21	19	EL	148	18

M = Medal race; EL = Eliminated – did not advance into the medal race

== Shooting ==
Greek shooters have achieved quota places for the following events by virtue of their best finishes at the 2015 ISSF World Cup series, and European Championships or Games, as long as they obtained a minimum qualifying score (MQS) by March 31, 2016.

Athlete	Event	Qualification		Semifinal		Final	
Athlete	Event	Points	Rank	Points	Rank	Points	Rank
Efthimios Mitas	Men's skeet	119	13	Did not advance			
Anna Korakaki	Women's 10 m air pistol	387	3 Q	—N/a		177.7	3rd place, bronze medalist(s)
Anna Korakaki	Women's 25 m pistol	584	2 Q	19	1 Q	8	1st place, gold medalist(s)

Qualification Legend: Q = Qualify for the next round; q = Qualify for the bronze medal (shotgun)

== Swimming ==
Greek swimmers have so far achieved qualifying standards in the following events (up to a maximum of 2 swimmers in each event at the Olympic Qualifying Time (OQT), and potentially 1 at the Olympic Selection Time (OST)):

Men

Athlete	Event	Heat		Semifinal		Final	
Athlete	Event	Time	Rank	Time	Rank	Time	Rank
Apostolos Christou	100 m backstroke	54.12	18	Did not advance			
Apostolos Christou	200 m backstroke	1:59.78	24	Did not advance			
Stefanos Dimitriadis	200 m butterfly	1:56.76	18	Did not advance			
Dimitrios Dimitriou	400 m freestyle	3:54.98	41	—N/a		Did not advance	
Spyridon Gianniotis	10 km open water	—N/a				1:52:59.8	2nd place, silver medalist(s)
Kristian Golomeev	50 m freestyle	21.93	10 Q	21.98	13	Did not advance	
Kristian Golomeev	100 m freestyle	48.68 NR	20	Did not advance			
Dimitrios Koulouris	200 m breaststroke	2:14.86	35	Did not advance			
Odysseas Meladinis	50 m freestyle	22.47	33	Did not advance			
Panagiotis Samilidis	100 m breaststroke	1:00.35	19	Did not advance			
Panagiotis Samilidis	200 m breaststroke	2:12.68	27	Did not advance			
Andreas Vazaios	200 m individual medley	1:59.33	9 Q	1:59.54	11	Did not advance	
Kristian Golomeev; Christos Katranzis; Odysseas Meladinis; Apostolos Christou	4 × 100 m freestyle relay	3:14.62	10	—N/a		Did not advance	
Apostolos Christou; Kristian Golomeev; Panagiotis Samilidis; Andreas Vazaios	4 × 100 m medley relay	3:36.75	15	—N/a		Did not advance	

Women

Athlete	Event	Heat		Semifinal		Final	
Athlete	Event	Time	Rank	Time	Rank	Time	Rank
Kalliopi Araouzou	10 km open water	—N/a				1:57:31.6	11
Theodora Drakou	50 m freestyle	25.36	31	Did not advance			
Anna Ntountounaki	100 m butterfly	58.27 NR	17	Did not advance			
Kristel Vourna	100 m butterfly	58.89	22	Did not advance			

== Synchronized swimming ==
Greece has fielded a squad of two synchronized swimmers to compete only in the women's duet by virtue of their fourth-place finish at the FINA Olympic test event in Rio de Janeiro.

Athlete	Event	Technical routine		Free routine (preliminary)			Free routine (final)		
Athlete	Event	Points	Rank	Points	Total (technical + free)	Rank	Points	Total (technical + free)	Rank
Evangelia Papazoglou; Evangelia Platanioti	Duet	85.3550	10	86.1000	171.4550	10 Q	86.5000	171.8550	10

== Table tennis ==
Greece has entered one athlete into the table tennis competition at the Games. Panagiotis Gionis secured one of ten available Olympic spots to confirm his fourth consecutive appearance in the men's singles by winning the group final match at the European Qualification Tournament in Halmstad, Sweden.

Athlete	Event	Preliminary	Round 1	Round 2	Round 3	Round of 16	Quarterfinals	Semifinals	Final / BM	
Athlete	Event	Opposition Result	Opposition Result	Opposition Result	Opposition Result	Opposition Result	Opposition Result	Opposition Result	Opposition Result	Rank
Panagiotis Gionis	Men's singles	Bye		Tanviriyavechakul (THA); W 4–0	Mizutani (JPN); L 1–4	Did not advance				

== Water polo ==
Summary

Key:

- FT – After full time.
- P – Match decided by penalty-shootout.

Team	Event	Group stage						Quarterfinal	Classification 5th–8th	5th place match	
Team	Event	Opposition Score	Opposition Score	Opposition Score	Opposition Score	Opposition Score	Rank	Opposition Score	Opposition Score	Opposition Score	Rank
Greece men's	Men's tournament	Japan; W 8–7	Serbia; D 9–9	Hungary; D 8–8	Brazil; W 9–4	Australia; L 7–12	2	Italy; L 5–9	Spain; W 9–7	Hungary; L 10–12	6

=== Men's tournament ===
The Greek men's water polo team qualified for the Olympics, after winning the bronze medal in the men's tournament at the 2015 FINA World Championships in Kazan, Russia.

Team roster

The following is the Greek roster in the men's water polo tournament of the 2016 Summer Olympics.

Head coach: Thodoris Vlachos

№	Name	Pos.	Height	Weight	Date of birth	2016 club
1	Konstantinos Flegkas	GK	1.92 m (6 ft 4 in)	88 kg (194 lb)	17 July 1988	(Greece) Ydraikos
2	Emmanouil Mylonakis	D	1.85 m (6 ft 1 in)	75 kg (165 lb)	9 April 1985	(Greece) Olympiacos
3	Georgios Dervisis	CB	1.95 m (6 ft 5 in)	92 kg (203 lb)	30 October 1994	(Greece) Olympiacos
4	Konstantinos Genidounias	D	1.83 m (6 ft 0 in)	87 kg (192 lb)	3 May 1993	(Greece) Olympiacos
5	Ioannis Fountoulis	D	1.86 m (6 ft 1 in)	90 kg (198 lb)	28 May 1988	(Greece) Olympiacos
6	Kyriakos Pontikeas	CB	1.92 m (6 ft 4 in)	84 kg (185 lb)	9 May 1991	(Greece) Olympiacos
7	Christos Afroudakis (c)	D	1.88 m (6 ft 2 in)	88 kg (194 lb)	23 May 1984	(Greece) Vouliagmeni
8	Evangelos Delakas	CB	1.89 m (6 ft 2 in)	90 kg (198 lb)	8 February 1985	(Greece) Olympiacos
9	Konstantinos Mourikis	CF	1.97 m (6 ft 6 in)	109 kg (240 lb)	11 July 1988	(Greece) Olympiacos
10	Christodoulos Kolomvos	CF	1.86 m (6 ft 1 in)	103 kg (227 lb)	26 October 1988	(Greece) Olympiacos
11	Alexandros Gounas	D	1.79 m (5 ft 10 in)	73 kg (161 lb)	3 October 1989	(Greece) Olympiacos
12	Angelos Vlachopoulos	D	1.79 m (5 ft 10 in)	75 kg (165 lb)	28 September 1991	(Italy) Posillipo
13	Stefanos Galanopoulos	GK	1.97 m (6 ft 6 in)	89 kg (196 lb)	22 February 1993	(Greece) Olympiacos

Group play

Pos	Team	Pld	W	D	L	GF	GA	GD	Pts	Qualification
1	Hungary	5	2	3	0	57	43	+14	7	Quarter-finals
2	Greece	5	2	2	1	41	40	+1	6	Quarter-finals
3	Brazil (H)	5	3	0	2	40	39	+1	6	Quarter-finals
4	Serbia	5	2	2	1	49	44	+5	6	Quarter-finals
5	Australia	5	2	1	2	44	40	+4	5	
6	Japan	5	0	0	5	36	61	−25	0	

Source: Rio2016
Rules for classification: 1) Points; 2) Head-to-head points; 3) Head-to-head goal difference; 4) Head-to-head goals scored; 5) Goal difference.
(H) Hosts

6 August 2016; 13:00	Report	Greece	8–7	Japan	Maria Lenk Aquatic Center, Rio de Janeiro; Referees: Sergey Naumov (RUS), Stanko Ivanovski (MNE)
6 August 2016; 13:00	Report	Score by quarters: 2–2, 2–1, 0–4, 4–0			Maria Lenk Aquatic Center, Rio de Janeiro; Referees: Sergey Naumov (RUS), Stanko Ivanovski (MNE)
6 August 2016; 13:00	Report	Vlachopoulos 3	Goals	three players 2	Maria Lenk Aquatic Center, Rio de Janeiro; Referees: Sergey Naumov (RUS), Stanko Ivanovski (MNE)

8 August 2016; 09:00	Report	Serbia	9–9	Greece	Maria Lenk Aquatic Center, Rio de Janeiro; Referees: Mark Koganov (AZE), Joseph Peila (USA)
8 August 2016; 09:00	Report	Score by quarters: 1–2, 0–2, 4–3, 4–2			Maria Lenk Aquatic Center, Rio de Janeiro; Referees: Mark Koganov (AZE), Joseph Peila (USA)
8 August 2016; 09:00	Report	Filipović 2	Goals	Fountoulis 4	Maria Lenk Aquatic Center, Rio de Janeiro; Referees: Mark Koganov (AZE), Joseph Peila (USA)

10 August 2016; 10:20	Report	Greece	8–8	Hungary	Maria Lenk Aquatic Center, Rio de Janeiro; Referees: Nenad Peris (CRO), Mark Koganov (AZE)
10 August 2016; 10:20	Report	Score by quarters: 1–2, 1–1, 4–2, 2–3			Maria Lenk Aquatic Center, Rio de Janeiro; Referees: Nenad Peris (CRO), Mark Koganov (AZE)
10 August 2016; 10:20	Report	Vlachopoulos 3	Goals	Hárai 3	Maria Lenk Aquatic Center, Rio de Janeiro; Referees: Nenad Peris (CRO), Mark Koganov (AZE)

12 August 2016; 19:30	Report	Greece	9–4	Brazil	Maria Lenk Aquatic Center, Rio de Janeiro; Referees: Boris Margeta (SLO), Sergey Naumov (RUS)
12 August 2016; 19:30	Report	Score by quarters: 3–1, 1–1, 3–2, 2–0			Maria Lenk Aquatic Center, Rio de Janeiro; Referees: Boris Margeta (SLO), Sergey Naumov (RUS)
12 August 2016; 19:30	Report	three players 2	Goals	Silva 2	Maria Lenk Aquatic Center, Rio de Janeiro; Referees: Boris Margeta (SLO), Sergey Naumov (RUS)

14 August 2016; 14:10	Report	Australia	12–7	Greece	Olympic Aquatics Stadium, Rio de Janeiro; Referees: Filippo Gomez (ITA), Joseph Peila (USA)
14 August 2016; 14:10	Report	Score by quarters: 5–3, 5–1, 0–1, 2–2			Olympic Aquatics Stadium, Rio de Janeiro; Referees: Filippo Gomez (ITA), Joseph Peila (USA)
14 August 2016; 14:10	Report	Cotterill, Howden 3	Goals	Fountoulis 3	Olympic Aquatics Stadium, Rio de Janeiro; Referees: Filippo Gomez (ITA), Joseph Peila (USA)

Quarterfinal

16 August 2016; 16:30	Report	Greece	5–9	Italy	Olympic Aquatics Stadium, Rio de Janeiro; Referees: Sergey Naumov (RUS), Boris Margeta (SLO)
16 August 2016; 16:30	Report	Score by quarters: 0–2, 2–2, 1–2, 2–3			Olympic Aquatics Stadium, Rio de Janeiro; Referees: Sergey Naumov (RUS), Boris Margeta (SLO)
16 August 2016; 16:30	Report	Fountoulis, Mourikis 2	Goals	Figlioli 3	Olympic Aquatics Stadium, Rio de Janeiro; Referees: Sergey Naumov (RUS), Boris Margeta (SLO)

Classification semifinal (5–8)

18 August 2016; 15:10	Report	Greece	9–7	Spain	Olympic Aquatics Stadium, Rio de Janeiro; Referees: Boris Margeta (SLO), Nenad Peris (CRO)
18 August 2016; 15:10	Report	Score by quarters: 1–0, 2–1, 4–3, 2–3			Olympic Aquatics Stadium, Rio de Janeiro; Referees: Boris Margeta (SLO), Nenad Peris (CRO)
18 August 2016; 15:10	Report	Afroudakis, Mourikis 2	Goals	Molina 4	Olympic Aquatics Stadium, Rio de Janeiro; Referees: Boris Margeta (SLO), Nenad Peris (CRO)

Fifth place match

20 August 2016; 16:30	Report	Hungary	12–10	Greece	Olympic Aquatics Stadium, Rio de Janeiro; Referees: Mark Koganov (AZE), Joseph Peila (USA)
20 August 2016; 16:30	Report	Score by quarters: 2–1, 4–4, 3–3, 3–2			Olympic Aquatics Stadium, Rio de Janeiro; Referees: Mark Koganov (AZE), Joseph Peila (USA)
20 August 2016; 16:30	Report	Kis, Zalánki 3	Goals	four players 2	Olympic Aquatics Stadium, Rio de Janeiro; Referees: Mark Koganov (AZE), Joseph Peila (USA)

== Weightlifting ==
Greece has received an unused quota place from IWF to send a male weightlifter to the Olympics.

Athlete	Event	Snatch		Clean & Jerk		Total	Rank
Athlete	Event	Result	Rank	Result	Rank	Total	Rank
Theodoros Iakovidis	Men's −85 kg	160	9	190	13	350	12

== Wrestling ==
Greece has qualified one wrestler for the women's freestyle 53 kg into the Olympic competition as a result of her semifinal triumph at the initial meet of the World Qualification Tournament in Ulaanbaatar.

Key:

- VT – Victory by Fall.
- PP – Decision by Points – the loser with technical points.
- PO – Decision by Points – the loser without technical points.
- ST – Technical superiority – the loser without technical points and a margin of victory of at least 8 (Greco-Roman) or 10 (freestyle) points.

Women's freestyle

Athlete	Event	Qualification	Round of 16	Quarterfinal	Semifinal	Repechage 1	Repechage 2	Final / BM	
Athlete	Event	Opposition Result	Opposition Result	Opposition Result	Opposition Result	Opposition Result	Opposition Result	Opposition Result	Rank
Maria Prevolaraki	−53 kg	Bye	Kumari (IND); W 3–1 ^{PP}	Argüello (VEN); L 1–3 ^{PP}	Did not advance				10

== See also ==
- Greece at the 2016 Summer Paralympics
