= Croatia at the 2016 Summer Olympics =

- IOC code: CRO
- NOC: Croatian Olympic Committee
- Website: www.hoo.hr (in Croatian and English)

in Rio de Janeiro
- Competitors: 87 in 18 sports
- Flag bearer: Josip Pavić
- Medals Ranked 17th: Gold 5 Silver 3 Bronze 2 Total 10

Summer Olympics appearances (overview)
- 1992; 1996; 2000; 2004; 2008; 2012; 2016; 2020; 2024

Other related appearances
- Austria (1900); Yugoslavia (1920–1988)

Croatia competed at the 2016 Summer Olympics in Rio de Janeiro, Brazil, from 5 to 21 August 2016. This was the nation's seventh consecutive appearance at the Summer Olympics. The Croatian Olympic Committee (Croatian: Hrvatski olimpijski odbor, HOO) confirmed a roster of 87 athletes, 68 men and 19 women, to compete across 18 sports at the Games.

Croatia left Rio de Janeiro with a total of 10 medals (5 gold, 3 silver, and 2 bronze), finishing seventeenth in the overall standings. These Games also marked the nation's most successful outcome in Summer Olympic history since the break-up of SFR Yugoslavia, surpassing the six medals won at London 2012. Three of the medals were awarded to the team in track and field, two in rowing and sailing, and one each in shooting and boxing. Croatia also proved particularly successful in traditional team sports, as the water polo players obtained the silver medal in the men's tournament, despite losing its title defense to neighboring Serbia at the final match.

Among the medalists were super heavyweight boxer Filip Hrgović and Laser sailor Tonči Stipanović, who both secured historic first Olympic medals for Croatia in their respective sports. 470 duo Šime Fantela and Igor Marenić controlled the race ahead of their top rivals Australia and Greece to win the nation's first ever sailing title. Discus thrower Sandra Perković successfully defended her Olympic title, while 21-year-old Sara Kolak trounced the vastly experienced field to become the women's javelin throw champion. Shooter Josip Glasnović succeeded his teammate Giovanni Cernogoraz as the new Olympic champion in the men's trap. Brothers Martin and Valent Sinković fought a tough duel against Lithuania to capture a gold medal in the men's double sculls, adding it to their world and European titles over the last two years.

== Medalists ==
Medal	Name	Sport	Event	Date
Gold	Josip Glasnović	Shooting	Men's trap	8 August
Gold	Martin Sinković; Valent Sinković	Rowing	Men's double sculls	11 August
Gold	Sandra Perković	Athletics	Women's discus throw	16 August
Gold	Šime Fantela; Igor Marenić	Sailing	Men's 470	18 August
Gold	Sara Kolak	Athletics	Women's javelin throw	18 August
Silver	Damir Martin	Rowing	Men's single sculls	13 August
Silver	Tonči Stipanović	Sailing	Laser	16 August
Silver	Croatia men's national water polo team: Josip Pavić; Damir Burić; Antonio Petković; Luka Lončar; Maro Joković; Luka Bukić; Marko Macan; Andro Bušlje; Sandro Sukno; Ivan Krapić; Anđelo Šetka; Xavier García; Marko Bijač	Water polo	Men's tournament	20 August
Bronze	Filip Hrgović	Boxing	Men's super heavyweight	19 August
Bronze	Blanka Vlašić	Athletics	Women's high jump	20 August

Medals by sport
Sport	1st place, gold medalist(s)	2nd place, silver medalist(s)	3rd place, bronze medalist(s)	Total
Athletics	2	0	1	3
Rowing	1	1	0	2
Sailing	1	1	0	2
Shooting	1	0	0	1
Water polo	0	1	0	1
Boxing	0	0	1	1
Total	5	3	2	10

Medals by day
Day	1st place, gold medalist(s)	2nd place, silver medalist(s)	3rd place, bronze medalist(s)	Total
8 August	1	0	0	1
11 August	1	0	0	1
13 August	0	1	0	1
16 August	1	1	0	2
18 August	2	0	0	2
19 August	0	0	1	1
20 August	0	1	1	2
Total	5	3	2	10

== Competitors ==
The Croatian Olympic Committee (Croatian: Hrvatski olimpijski odbor, HOO) fielded a team of 87 athletes, 68 men and 19 women, across eighteen sports at the Games; it was the nation's fourth-largest delegation sent to the Olympics, but the smallest since 2004.

More than 50 percent of the men's side competed in traditional team sports, with the water polo players looking to defend their Olympic title from the London Games four years earlier. Track and field accounted for the largest number of athletes on the squad by an individual-based sport, with 10 entries. There was a single competitor each in diving, judo, table tennis, weightlifting, and wrestling.

Nine of the past Olympic medalists from the individual-based sports returned, including defending champions Giovanni Cernogoraz (men's trap shooting) and Sandra Perković (women's discus throw), taekwondo fighter Lucija Zaninović (women's 49 kg), along with her twin sister Ana, rifle shooter Snježana Pejčić, gymnast Filip Ude (men's pommel horse), and experienced high jumper Blanka Vlašić. Rowers Damir Martin and brothers Martin and Valent Sinković, all of whom won silver as members of the quadruple sculls crew from London 2012, qualified separately for the smaller boats at the Games, with the latter two entering as reigning world champions and top medal favorites in the double sculls.

Other notable athletes on the Croatian roster included world sailing champions Šime Fantela and Igor Marenić in the men's 470 class, world-ranked tennis player Marin Čilić, and boxing pro Filip Hrgović (men's super heavyweight). Water polo goalkeeper Josip Pavić, who helped his team secure a gold-medal triumph in the men's tournament at London 2012, was selected by the committee as Croatia's flag bearer for the opening ceremony.

The following is the list of number of competitors participating in the Games. Note that reserves in fencing, field hockey, football, gymnastics, handball and rowing are not counted as athletes:

Sport	Men	Women	Total
Athletics	3	7	10
Basketball	12	0	12
Boxing	2	0	2
Cycling	2	0	2
Diving	0	1	1
Gymnastics	1	1	2
Handball	14	0	14
Judo	0	1	1
Rowing	3	0	3
Sailing	7	1	8
Shooting	3	4	7
Swimming	1	1	2
Table tennis	1	0	1
Taekwondo	1	2	3
Tennis	3	1	4
Water polo	13	0	13
Weightlifting	1	0	1
Wrestling	1	0	1
Total	68	19	87

== Athletics ==
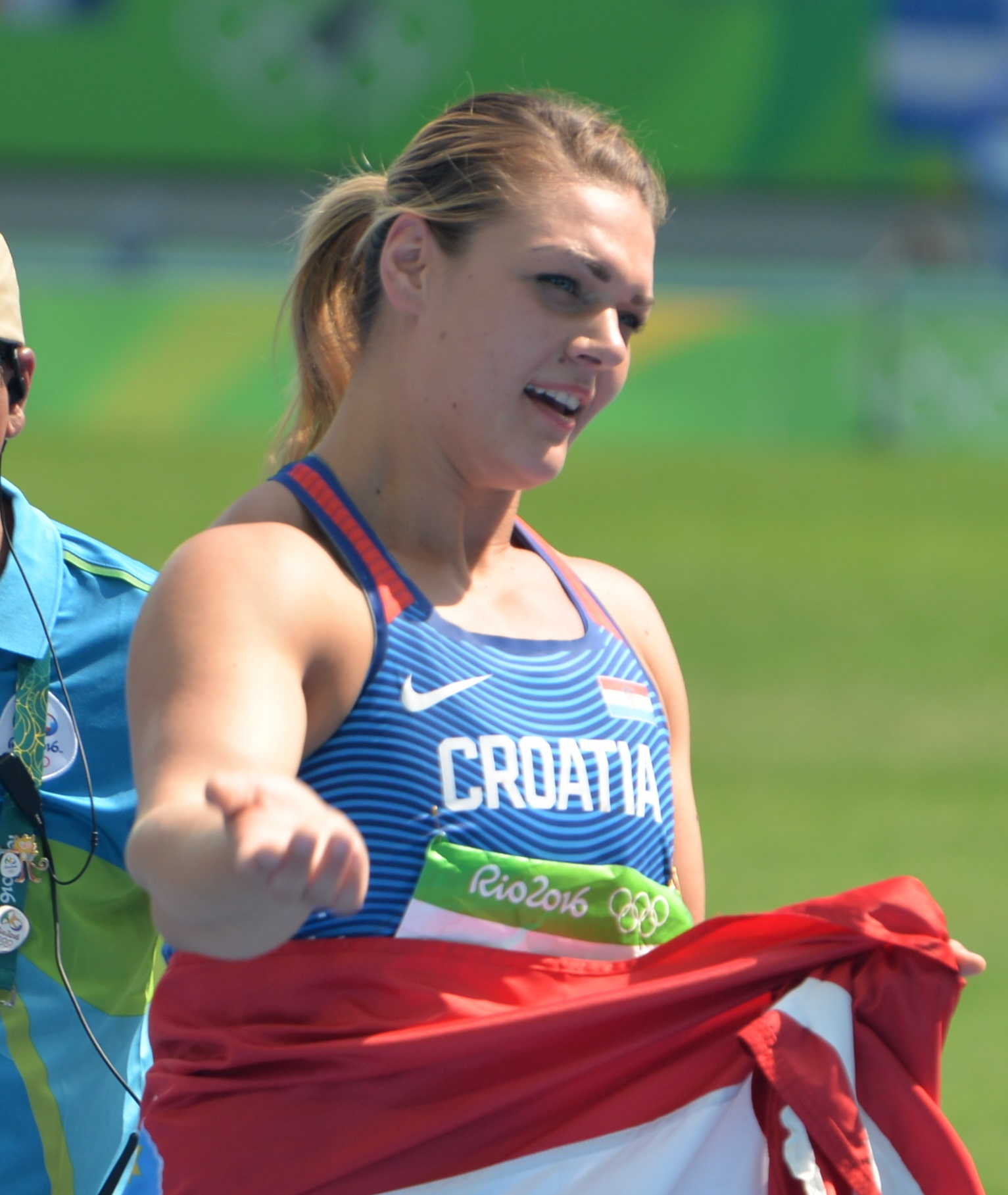
Sandra Perković successfully defend her Olympic discus throw title

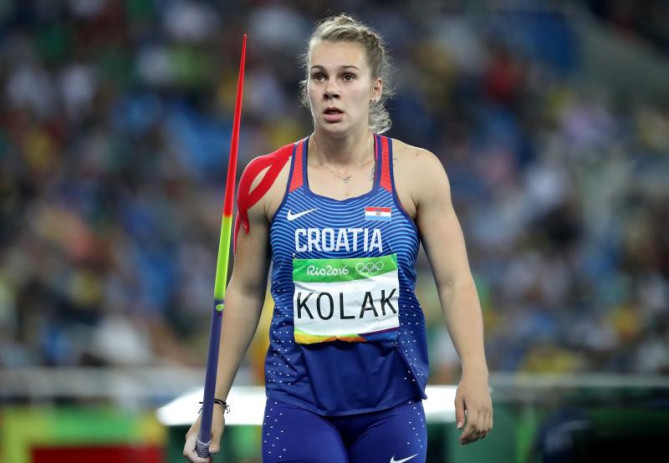
Sara Kolak improves national record two times to take gold medal in the javelin throw

Croatian athletes have achieved qualifying standards in the following athletics events (up to a maximum of 3 athletes in each event):

Key

- Note–Ranks given for track events are within the athlete's heat only
- Q = Qualified for the next round
- q = Qualified for the next round as a fastest loser or, in field events, by position without achieving the qualifying target
- NR = National record
- N/A = Round not applicable for the event
- Bye = Athlete not required to compete in round

Track & road events

Athlete	Event	Heat		Semifinal		Final	
Athlete	Event	Result	Rank	Result	Rank	Result	Rank
Andrea Ivančević	Women's 100 m hurdles	12.90	4 q	12.93	6	Did not advance	
Matea Matošević	Women's marathon	—N/a				2:50:00	104
Marija Vrajić	Women's marathon	—N/a				2:59:24	119

Field events
Men

Athlete	Event	Qualification		Final	
Athlete	Event	Distance	Position	Distance	Position
Ivan Horvat	Pole vault	5.30	27	Did not advance	
Filip Mihaljević	Shot put	19.69	21	Did not advance	
Stipe Žunić	Shot put	20.52	8 q	20.04	11

Women

Athlete	Event	Qualification		Final	
Athlete	Event	Distance	Position	Distance	Position
Sara Kolak	Javelin throw	64.30 NR	3 Q	66.18 NR	1st place, gold medalist(s)
Sandra Perković	Discus throw	64.81	3 Q	69.21	1st place, gold medalist(s)
Ana Šimić	High jump	1.89	22	Did not advance	
Blanka Vlašić	High jump	1.94	=1 Q	1.97	3rd place, bronze medalist(s)

== Basketball ==
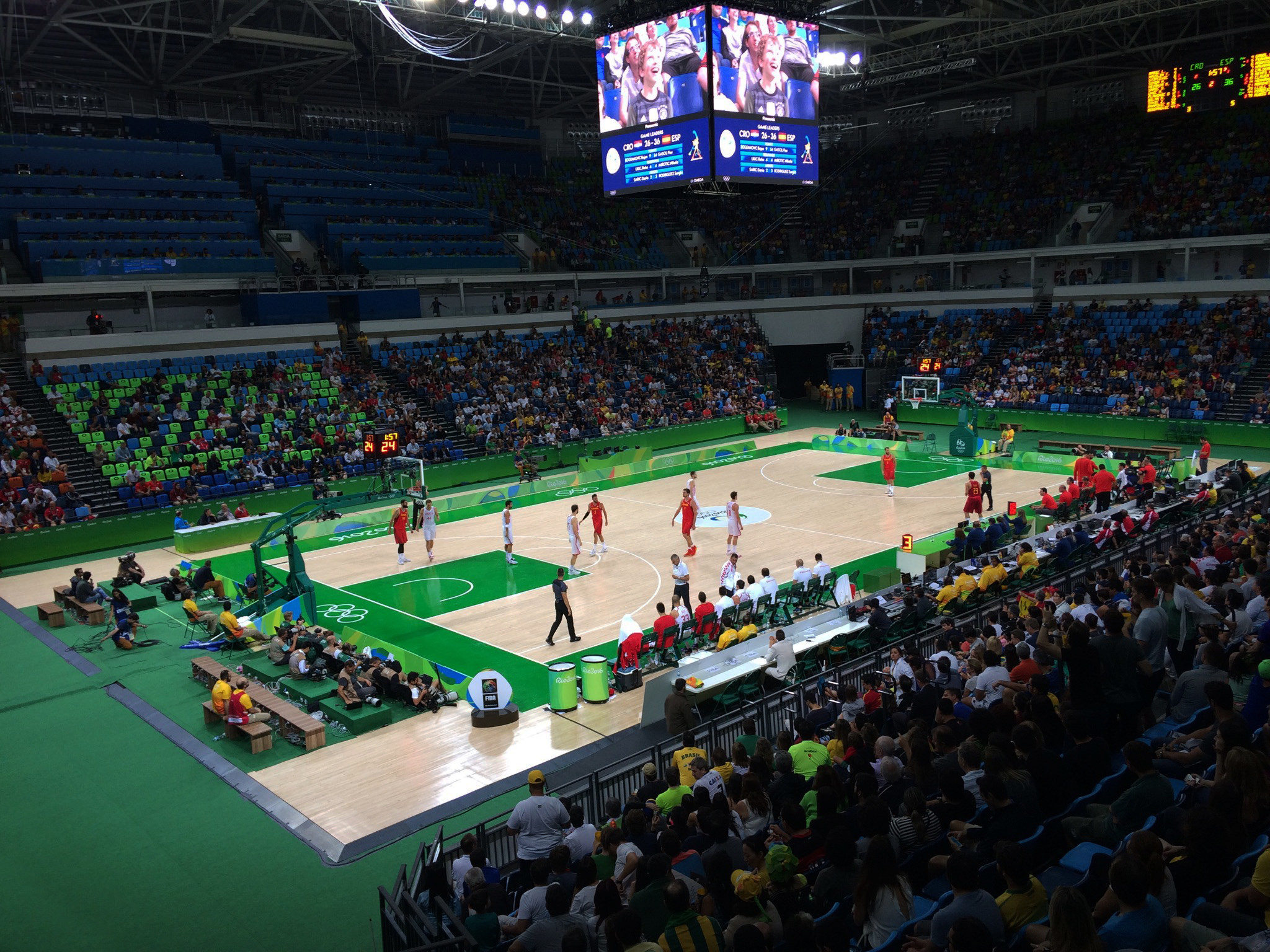
Croatia in the group stage game against Spain

=== Men's tournament ===
Croatia men's basketball team qualified for the Olympics by securing its lone outright berth and winning the final match over Italy at the Turin leg of the 2016 FIBA World Qualifying Tournament, signifying the nation's comeback to the men's tournament after an eight-year hiatus.

Team roster

The following is the Croatia roster in the men's basketball tournament of the 2016 Summer Olympics.

Croatia men's national basketball team – 2016 Summer Olympics roster
Players
Coaches

Pos.	No.	Name	Age – Date of birth	Height	Club	Ctr.
SF	4	Luka Babić	24 – 29 September 1991	2.01 m (6 ft 7 in)	Cedevita	(Croatia)
SG	5	Filip Krušlin	27 – 18 March 1989	1.96 m (6 ft 5 in)	Cedevita	(Croatia)
PG	6	Rok Stipčević	30 – 20 May 1986	1.85 m (6 ft 1 in)	Dinamo Sassari	(Italy)
SG	7	Krunoslav Simon	31 – 24 June 1985	1.97 m (6 ft 6 in)	Armani Milano	(Italy)
SF	8	Mario Hezonja	21 – 25 February 1995	2.03 m (6 ft 8 in)	Orlando Magic	(United States)
PF	9	Dario Šarić	22 – 8 April 1994	2.08 m (6 ft 10 in)	Anadolu Efes	(Turkey)
PG	10	Roko Ukić (C)	31 – 5 December 1984	1.96 m (6 ft 5 in)	Pallacanestro Cantù	(Italy)
C	12	Darko Planinić	25 – 22 November 1990	2.11 m (6 ft 11 in)	Laboral Kutxa	(Spain)
C	15	Miro Bilan	27 – 21 July 1989	2.15 m (7 ft 1 in)	Cedevita	(Croatia)
PF	33	Željko Šakić	28 – 14 April 1988	2.03 m (6 ft 8 in)	Cibona	(Croatia)
PF	35	Marko Arapović	20 – 20 July 1996	2.07 m (6 ft 9 in)	Cedevita	(Croatia)
SG	44	Bojan Bogdanović	27 – 18 April 1989	2.00 m (6 ft 7 in)	Brooklyn Nets	(United States)

Head coach

- (Croatia) Aleksandar Petrović

Assistant coach(es)

- (Croatia) Dražen Anzulović
- (Croatia) Ivica Skelin
- (Croatia) Dražen Orešković

Legend

- (C) Team captain
- Club – describes last
  club before the tournament
- Age – describes age
  on 6 August 2016

Group play

Pos	Team	Pld	W	L	PF	PA	PD	Pts	Qualification
1	Croatia	5	3	2	400	407	−7	8 (Note: In games among the four teams at 3–2, Croatia and Spain were 2–1 while Argentina and Lithuania were 1–2. Croatia beat Spain 72–70, and Lithuania beat Argentina 81–73.)	Quarterfinals
2	Spain	5	3	2	432	357	+75	8	Quarterfinals
3	Lithuania	5	3	2	392	428	−36	8	Quarterfinals
4	Argentina	5	3	2	441	428	+13	8	Quarterfinals
5	Brazil (H)	5	2	3	411	407	+4	7	
6	Nigeria	5	1	4	392	441	−49	6	

Source: FIBA
Rules for classification: 1) points; 2) head-to-head points; 3) head-to-head points difference; 4) head-to-head number of points scored.
(H) Hosts
Notes:

7 August 2016
19:00

Boxscore

Croatia	72–70	Spain
Scoring by quarter: 13–21, 19–17, 15–16, 25–16
Pts: Bogdanović 23; Rebs: three players 7 Asts: Šarić 5		Pts: Gasol 26; Rebs: Gasol 9 Asts: Rodríguez 7

Carioca Arena 1, Rio de Janeiro
Attendance: 8,039
Referees: Stephen Seibel (CAN), Oļegs Latiševs (LAT), Robert Lottermoser (GER)

9 August 2016
22:30

Boxscore

Argentina	90–82	Croatia
Scoring by quarter: 22–22, 24–18, 27–14, 17–28
Pts: Scola 23; Rebs: Scola 9 Asts: Campazzo 8		Pts: Šarić 19; Rebs: Šarić 10; Asts: Šarić 7

Carioca Arena 1, Rio de Janeiro
Attendance: 8,514
Referees: Christos Christodoulou (GRE), Steven Anderson (USA), José Reyes (MEX)

11 August 2016
14:15

Boxscore

Brazil	76–80	Croatia
Scoring by quarter: 17–19, 14–22, 19–18, 26–21
Pts: Barbosa 16; Rebs: Lima 6 Asts: Huertas 9		Pts: Bogdanović 33; Rebs: Šarić 7 Asts: Ukić 4

Carioca Arena 1, Rio de Janeiro
Attendance: 10,756
Referees: Borys Ryzhyk (UKR), Roberto Vázquez (PUR), Oļegs Latiševs (LAT)

13 August 2016
22:30

Boxscore

Croatia	76–90	Nigeria
Scoring by quarter: 28–21, 11–22, 17–27, 20–20
Pts: Bogdanović 28; Rebs: Simon 6 Asts: Ukić 4		Pts: Umeh 19; Rebs: Diogu 12; Asts: Ere 6

Carioca Arena 1, Rio de Janeiro
Attendance: 8,720
Referees: Steven Anderson (USA), Damir Javor (SLO), Scott Beker (AUS)

15 August 2016
22:30

Boxscore

Lithuania	81–90	Croatia
Scoring by quarter: 21–13, 20–34, 14–28, 26–15
Pts: Kalnietis 26; Rebs: Valančiūnas 6 Asts: Kalnietis 11		Pts: Bogdanović 22; Rebs: Simon 10; Asts: Simon 6

Carioca Arena 1, Rio de Janeiro
Attendance: 7,809
Referees: Borys Ryzhyk (UKR), Steven Anderson (USA), Piotr Pastusiak (POL)

Quarterfinal

17 August 2016
22:15

Boxscore

Croatia	83–86	Serbia
Scoring by quarter: 19–20, 19–12, 14–34, 31–20
Pts: Bogdanović 28; Rebs: Planinić 9 Asts: Simon 5		Pts: Bogdanović 18; Rebs: three players 4 Asts: Teodosić 10

Carioca Arena 1, Rio de Janeiro
Attendance: 9,027
Referees: Juan García (ESP), Borys Ryzhyk (UKR), Roberto Vázquez (PUR)

== Boxing ==
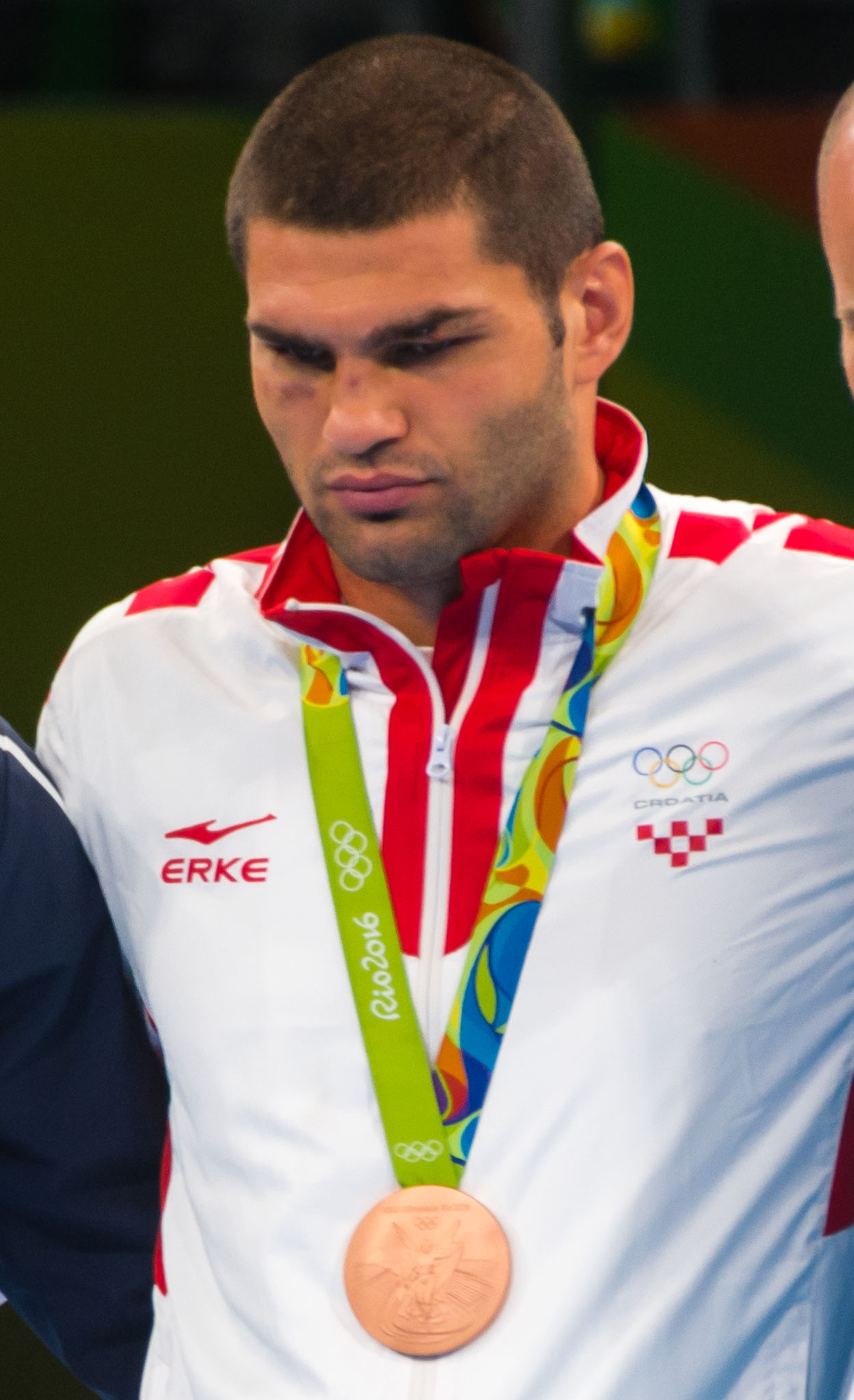
Filip Hrgović won a bronze medal in the Men's super heavyweight

Croatia has entered two boxers to compete in the following weight classes into the Olympic boxing tournament. Hrvoje Sep and Filip Hrgović were the only Croatians to be selected to the Olympic team by virtue of top two finishes of their respective division in the AIBA Pro Boxing series and World Series of Boxing.

Athlete	Event	Round of 32	Round of 16	Quarterfinals	Semifinals	Final	
Athlete	Event	Opposition Result	Opposition Result	Opposition Result	Opposition Result	Opposition Result	Rank
Hrvoje Sep	Men's light heavyweight	Salah (EGY); W 2–1	Borges (BRA); L 0–3	Did not advance			
Filip Hrgović	Men's super heavyweight	Bye	Demirezen (TUR); W 3–0	Pero (CUB); W TKO	Yoka (FRA); L 1–2	Did not advance	3rd place, bronze medalist(s)

== Cycling ==
=== Road ===
Croatian riders qualified for a maximum of two quota places in the men's Olympic road race by virtue of their top 15 final national ranking in the 2015 UCI Europe Tour.

Athlete	Event	Time	Rank
Kristijan Đurasek	Men's road race	6:13:36	18
Matija Kvasina	Men's road race	Did not finish	

== Diving ==
Croatia has received a spare continental berth freed up by South Africa from FINA to send a diver competing in the women's individual springboard to the Olympics, based on her results at the 2016 FINA World Cup series, signifying the nation's Olympic debut in the sport.

Athlete	Event	Preliminaries		Semifinals		Final	
Athlete	Event	Points	Rank	Points	Rank	Points	Rank
Marcela Marić	Women's 3 m springboard	271.40	25	Did not advance			

== Gymnastics ==
=== Artistic ===
Croatia has entered two artistic gymnasts into the Olympic competition. Beijing 2008 silver medalist Filip Ude and Ana Đerek had claimed their Olympic spots each in the men's and women's apparatus and all-around events, respectively, at the Olympic Test Event in Rio de Janeiro.

Men

Athlete	Event	Qualification								Final							
Athlete	Event	Apparatus						Total	Rank	Apparatus						Total	Rank
Athlete	Event	F	PH	R	V	PB	HB	Total	Rank	F	PH	R	V	PB	HB	Total	Rank
Filip Ude	Pommel horse	—N/a	14.333	—N/a				14.333	30	Did not advance							

Women

Athlete	Event	Qualification						Final					
Athlete	Event	Apparatus				Total	Rank	Apparatus				Total	Rank
Athlete	Event	V	UB	BB	F	Total	Rank	V	UB	BB	F	Total	Rank
Ana Đerek	All-around	0.000	DNS	11.433	13.200	DNF		Did not advance					

== Handball ==
Summary

Key:

- ET – After extra time
- P – Match decided by penalty-shootout.

Team	Event	Group stage						Quarterfinal	Semifinal	Final / BM	
Team	Event	Opposition Score	Opposition Score	Opposition Score	Opposition Score	Opposition Score	Rank	Opposition Score	Opposition Score	Opposition Score	Rank
Croatia men's	Men's tournament	Qatar; L 23–30	Argentina; W 27–26	Denmark; W 27–24	France; W 29–28	Tunisia; W 41–26	1	Poland; L 27–30	Did not advance		5

=== Men's tournament ===
Croatia men's handball team qualified for the Olympics by virtue of a top two finish at the third meet of the Olympic Qualification Tournament in Herning, Denmark.

Team roster

The following is the Croatian roster in the men's handball tournament of the 2016 Summer Olympics.

Head coach: Željko Babić

No.	Pos.	Name	Date of birth (age)	Height	App.	Goals	Club
1	GK	Ivan Stevanović	18 May 1982 (aged 34)	1.93 m	15	0	(Croatia) Zagreb
5	CB	Domagoj Duvnjak	1 June 1988 (aged 28)	1.97 m	153	497	(Germany) THW Kiel
7	RB	Luka Stepančić	20 November 1990 (aged 25)	2.03 m	16	26	(France) Paris Saint-Germain
8	RB	Marko Kopljar	12 February 1986 (aged 30)	2.10 m	124	254	(Hungary) Telekom Veszprém
10	LB	Jakov Gojun	18 April 1986 (aged 30)	2.04 m	125	71	(Germany) Füchse Berlin
12	GK	Ivan Pešić	17 March 1989 (aged 27)	1.93 m	22	0	(Belarus) Meshkov Brest
13	RW	Zlatko Horvat	25 September 1984 (aged 31)	1.79 m	115	332	(Croatia) Zagreb
18	CB	Igor Karačić	2 November 1988 (aged 27)	1.89 m	27	71	(North Macedonia) Vardar
26	LW	Manuel Štrlek	1 December 1988 (aged 27)	1.81 m	99	318	(Poland) Vive Targi Kielce
27	RW	Ivan Čupić	27 March 1986 (aged 30)	1.78 m	112	440	(Poland) Vive Targi Kielce
30	LB	Marko Mamić	6 March 1994 (aged 22)	2.00 m	4	3	(France) Dunkerque
32	LB	Ivan Slišković	23 October 1991 (aged 24)	1.97 m	37	87	(Hungary) Telekom Veszprém
34	P	Ilija Brozović	26 May 1991 (aged 25)	1.95 m	15	12	(Germany) THW Kiel
44	P	Krešimir Kozina	25 June 1990 (aged 26)	1.96 m	2	0	(Germany) Flensburg-Handewitt

Group play

Pos	Team	Pld	W	D	L	GF	GA	GD	Pts	Qualification
1	Croatia	5	4	0	1	147	134	+13	8 (Note: Croatia 29–28 France)	Quarter-finals
2	France	5	4	0	1	152	126	+26	8	Quarter-finals
3	Denmark	5	3	0	2	136	127	+9	6	Quarter-finals
4	Qatar	5	2	1	2	122	127	−5	5	Quarter-finals
5	Argentina	5	1	0	4	110	126	−16	2	
6	Tunisia	5	0	1	4	118	145	−27	1	

Source: IHF
Rules for classification: 1) Points; 2) Head-to-head points; 3) Head-to-head goal difference; 4) Head-to-head goals scored; 5) Goal difference; 6) Goals scored; 7) Draw.
Notes:

7 August 2016; 09:30	Croatia	23–30	Qatar	Future Arena, Rio de Janeiro; Referees: López, Ramírez (ESP)
7 August 2016; 09:30	Štrlek 5	(8–15)	Marković 10	Future Arena, Rio de Janeiro; Referees: López, Ramírez (ESP)
7 August 2016; 09:30	3× (yellow card) 5× (suspension)	Report	1× (yellow card) 6× (suspension)	Future Arena, Rio de Janeiro; Referees: López, Ramírez (ESP)

9 August 2016; 21:50	Argentina	26–27	Croatia	Future Arena, Rio de Janeiro; Referees: Rashed, El-Sayed (EGY)
9 August 2016; 21:50	F. Fernández 8	(15–14)	Štrlek 7	Future Arena, Rio de Janeiro; Referees: Rashed, El-Sayed (EGY)
9 August 2016; 21:50	2× (yellow card) 4× (suspension) 1× (red card)	Report	4× (yellow card) 3× (suspension)	Future Arena, Rio de Janeiro; Referees: Rashed, El-Sayed (EGY)

11 August 2016; 14:40	Denmark	24–27	Croatia	Future Arena, Rio de Janeiro; Referees: Geipel, Helbig (GER)
11 August 2016; 14:40	Svan Hansen 9	(12–15)	Duvnjak 8	Future Arena, Rio de Janeiro; Referees: Geipel, Helbig (GER)
11 August 2016; 14:40	2× (yellow card) 3× (suspension)	Report	4× (yellow card) 5× (suspension)	Future Arena, Rio de Janeiro; Referees: Geipel, Helbig (GER)

13 August 2016; 11:30	Croatia	29–28	France	Future Arena, Rio de Janeiro; Referees: Pálsson, Elíasson (ISL)
13 August 2016; 11:30	Kopljar 6	(14–12)	Guigou 10	Future Arena, Rio de Janeiro; Referees: Pálsson, Elíasson (ISL)
13 August 2016; 11:30	4× (yellow card) 5× (suspension) 2× (red card)	Report	4× (yellow card) 2× (suspension)	Future Arena, Rio de Janeiro; Referees: Pálsson, Elíasson (ISL)

15 August 2016; 19:50	Croatia	41–26	Tunisia	Future Arena, Rio de Janeiro; Referees: Coulibaly, Diabaté (CIV)
15 August 2016; 19:50	Karačić 9	(25–10)	Boughanmi 7	Future Arena, Rio de Janeiro; Referees: Coulibaly, Diabaté (CIV)
15 August 2016; 19:50	2× (yellow card) 4× (suspension)	Report	1× (yellow card) 1× (suspension)	Future Arena, Rio de Janeiro; Referees: Coulibaly, Diabaté (CIV)

Quarterfinal

17 August 2016; 20:30	Croatia	27–30	Poland	Future Arena, Rio de Janeiro; Referees: Geipel, Helbig (GER)
17 August 2016; 20:30	Čupić, Stepančić 7	(14–18)	Bielecki 12	Future Arena, Rio de Janeiro; Referees: Geipel, Helbig (GER)
17 August 2016; 20:30	4× (yellow card) 2× (suspension) 1× (red card)	Report	2× (yellow card) 2× (suspension)	Future Arena, Rio de Janeiro; Referees: Geipel, Helbig (GER)

== Judo ==
Croatia has qualified one judoka for the women's middleweight category (70 kg) at the Games. Barbara Matić earned a continental quota spot from the European region as highest-ranked Croatian judoka outside of direct qualifying position in the IJF World Ranking List of 30 May 2016.

Athlete	Event	Round of 32	Round of 16	Quarterfinals	Semifinals	Repechage	Final / BM	
Athlete	Event	Opposition Result	Opposition Result	Opposition Result	Opposition Result	Opposition Result	Opposition Result	Rank
Barbara Matić	Women's −70 kg	Pérez (PUR); L 000–011	Did not advance					

== Rowing ==
Croatia qualified two boats for each of the following classes into the Olympic regatta. Rowers competing in the men's single and double sculls had confirmed Olympic places for their boats at the 2015 FISA World Championships in Lac d'Aiguebelette, France.

Athlete	Event	Heats		Repechage		Quarterfinals		Semifinals		Final	
Athlete	Event	Time	Rank	Time	Rank	Time	Rank	Time	Rank	Time	Rank
Damir Martin	Men's single sculls	7:23.08	2 QF	Bye		6:44.44	1 SA/B	6:59.43	2 FA	6:41.34	2nd place, silver medalist(s)
Martin Sinković; Valent Sinković	Men's double sculls	6:30.09	1 SA/B	Bye		—N/a		6:12.27	1 FA	6:50.28	1st place, gold medalist(s)

Qualification Legend: FA=Final A (medal); FB=Final B (non-medal); FC=Final C (non-medal); FD=Final D (non-medal); FE=Final E (non-medal); FF=Final F (non-medal); SA/B=Semifinals A/B; SC/D=Semifinals C/D; SE/F=Semifinals E/F; QF=Quarterfinals; R=Repechage

== Sailing ==
Croatian sailors qualified one boat in each of the following classes through the 2014 ISAF Sailing World Championships, the individual fleet Worlds, and European qualifying regattas.

Men

Athlete	Event	Race													Net points	Final rank
Athlete	Event	1	2	3	4	5	6	7	8	9	10	11	12	M*	Net points	Final rank
Luka Mratović	RS:X	13	11	15	21	~~DNF~~	19	27	18	34	26	31	30	EL	245	24
Tonči Stipanović	Laser	1	5	7	12	6	7	~~28~~	9	7	3	—N/a		18	76	2nd place, silver medalist(s)
Ivan Kljaković-Gašpić	Finn	6	8	10	~~15~~	8	8	4	10	2	13	—N/a		20	89	5
Šime Fantela; Igor Marenić	470	1	2	4	1	3	3	4	~~8~~	6	3	—N/a		16	43	1st place, gold medalist(s)
Petar Cupać; Pavle Kostov	49er	9	17	11	10	11	1	~~18~~	18	15	13	8	10	EL	122	15

Women

Athlete	Event	Race											Net points	Final rank
Athlete	Event	1	2	3	4	5	6	7	8	9	10	M*	Net points	Final rank
Tina Mihelić	Laser Radial	~~DSQ~~	3	11	10	4	14	DNF	5	23	16	EL	124	13

M = Medal race; EL = Eliminated – did not advance into the medal race

== Shooting ==
Croatian shooters achieved quota places for the following events by virtue of their best finishes at the 2014 and 2015 ISSF World Championships, the 2015 ISSF World Cup series, and European Championships or Games, as long as they obtained a minimum qualifying score (MQS) by 31 March 2016.

Following the completion of the two-year qualifying period, Croatia had selected a total of seven shooters to compete at the Games, including 2008 Olympic bronze medalist Snježana Pejčić and defending Olympic trap champion Giovanni Cernogoraz.

Men

Athlete	Event	Qualification		Semifinal		Final	
Athlete	Event	Points	Rank	Points	Rank	Points	Rank
Giovanni Cernogoraz	Trap	116	9	Did not advance			
Josip Glasnović	Trap	120	3 Q	15	1 Q	13 (+4)	1st place, gold medalist(s)
Petar Gorša	10 m air rifle	628.0	3 Q	—N/a		101.0	7
Petar Gorša	50 m rifle prone	621.9	20	—N/a		Did not advance	
Petar Gorša	50 m rifle 3 positions	1174	9	—N/a		Did not advance	

Women

Athlete	Event	Qualification		Final	
Athlete	Event	Points	Rank	Points	Rank
Valentina Gustin	10 m air rifle	413.9	23	Did not advance	
Marija Marović	10 m air pistol	377	33	Did not advance	
Snježana Pejčić	10 m air rifle	416.0	7 Q	102.0	7
Snježana Pejčić	50 m rifle 3 positions	580	12	Did not advance	
Tanja Perec	50 m rifle 3 positions	572	29	Did not advance	

Qualification Legend: Q = Qualify for the next round; q = Qualify for the bronze medal (shotgun)

== Swimming ==
Croatian swimmers achieved qualifying standards in the following events (up to a maximum of 2 swimmers in each event at the Olympic Qualifying Time (OQT), and 1 at the Olympic Selection Time (OST)):

Athlete	Event	Heat		Semifinal		Final	
Athlete	Event	Time	Rank	Time	Rank	Time	Rank
Mario Todorović	Men's 50 m freestyle	22.65	40	Did not advance			
Matea Samardžić	Women's 100 m backstroke	1:00.46	13 Q	1:00.60	13	Did not advance	
Matea Samardžić	Women's 200 m backstroke	2:10.51	15 Q	2:09.83	15	Did not advance	
Matea Samardžić	Women's 400 m individual medley	4:39.41	17	—N/a		Did not advance	

== Table tennis ==
Croatia has entered one athlete into the table tennis competition at the Games. Remarkably going to his third Olympics, Andrej Gaćina was automatically selected among the top 22 eligible players in the men's singles based on the ITTF Olympic Rankings.

Athlete	Event	Preliminary	Round 1	Round 2	Round 3	Round of 16	Quarterfinals	Semifinals	Final / BM	
Athlete	Event	Opposition Result	Opposition Result	Opposition Result	Opposition Result	Opposition Result	Opposition Result	Opposition Result	Opposition Result	Rank
Andrej Gaćina	Men's singles	Bye			Drinkhall (GBR); L 2–4	Did not advance				

== Taekwondo ==
Croatia entered three athletes into the taekwondo competition at the Olympics. Twin sisters and 2012 Olympians Lucija and Ana Zaninović qualified automatically and respectively for the women's flyweight (49 kg) and featherweight (57 kg) category by finishing in the top 6 WTF Olympic rankings. Filip Grgić secured the third spot on the Croatian team by virtue of his top two finish in the men's lightweight category (68 kg) at the 2016 European Qualification Tournament in Istanbul, Turkey.

Athlete	Event	Round of 16	Quarterfinals	Semifinals	Repechage	Final / BM	
Athlete	Event	Opposition Result	Opposition Result	Opposition Result	Opposition Result	Opposition Result	Rank
Filip Grgić	Men's −68 kg	González (ESP); L 3–4	Did not advance				
Lucija Zaninović	Women's −49 kg	Yesbergenova (KAZ); W 18–7	Aziez (FRA); L 3–4	Did not advance			
Ana Zaninović	Women's −57 kg	Alizadeh (IRI); L 6–7	Did not advance				

== Tennis ==
Croatia has entered four tennis players into the Olympic tournament. London 2012 Olympian Marin Čilić (world no. 13) and Borna Ćorić (world no. 48) qualified directly for the men's singles as two of the top 56 eligible players in the ATP World Rankings as of 6 June 2016.

Having been directly entered to the singles, Čilić also opted to play with his partner Marin Draganja in the men's doubles. Following the withdrawal of several players, Ana Konjuh (world no. 76) received an entry on 15 July 2016.

Athlete	Event	Round of 64	Round of 32	Round of 16	Quarterfinals	Semifinals	Final / BM	
Athlete	Event	Opposition Score	Opposition Score	Opposition Score	Opposition Score	Opposition Score	Opposition Score	Rank
Marin Čilić	Men's singles	Dimitrov (BUL); W 6–1, 6–4	Albot (MDA); W 6–3, 6–4	Monfils (FRA); L 7–6^{(8–6)}, 3–6, 4–6	Did not advance			
Borna Ćorić	Men's singles	Simon (FRA); L 4–6, 6–7^{(1–7)}	Did not advance					
Marin Čilić; Marin Draganja	Men's doubles	—N/a	Djokovic / Zimonjić (SRB); L 2–6, 2–6	Did not advance				
Ana Konjuh	Women's singles	Beck (GER); W 7–6^{(7–5)}, 6–1	Suárez Navarro (ESP); L 6–7^{(5–7)}, 3–6	Did not advance				

== Water polo ==
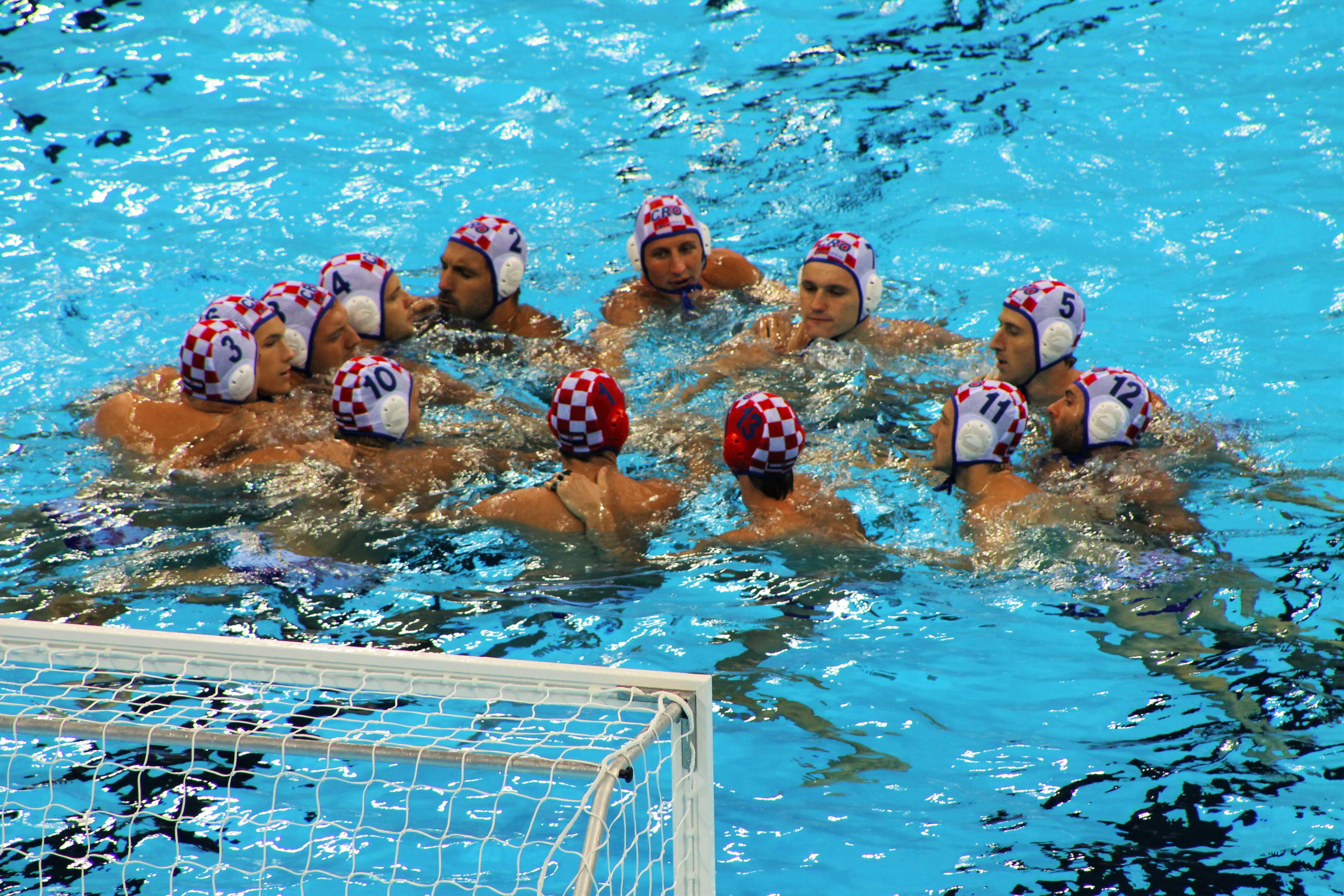
Croatia men's national water polo team in the final game

Summary

Key:

- FT – After full-time.
- P – Match decided by penalty-shootout.

Team	Event	Group stage						Quarterfinal	Semifinal	Final / BM	
Team	Event	Opposition Score	Opposition Score	Opposition Score	Opposition Score	Opposition Score	Rank	Opposition Score	Opposition Score	Opposition Score	Rank
Croatia men's	Men's tournament	United States; W 7–5	Montenegro; W 8–7	Spain; L 4–9	Italy; W 10–7	France; L 8–9	2	Brazil; W 10–6	Montenegro; W 12–8	Serbia; L 7–11	2nd place, silver medalist(s)

=== Men's tournament ===
Croatia men's water polo team qualified for the Olympics, after reaching the final in the men's tournament at the 2015 FINA World Championships in Kazan, Russia.

Team roster

The following is the Croatian roster in the men's water polo tournament of the 2016 Summer Olympics.

Head coach: Ivica Tucak

№	Name	Pos.	Height	Weight	Date of birth	2016 club
1	Josip Pavić (c)	GK	1.95 m (6 ft 5 in)	90 kg (198 lb)	15 January 1982	(Greece) Olympiacos
2	Damir Burić	CB	2.05 m (6 ft 9 in)	115 kg (254 lb)	2 December 1980	(Croatia) Primorje Rijeka
3	Antonio Petković	D	1.90 m (6 ft 3 in)	90 kg (198 lb)	11 January 1986	(Italy) Sport Management
4	Luka Lončar	CF	1.95 m (6 ft 5 in)	106 kg (234 lb)	26 June 1987	(Croatia) HAVK Mladost
5	Maro Joković	D	2.03 m (6 ft 8 in)	95 kg (209 lb)	1 October 1987	(Croatia) Jug Dubrovnik
6	Luka Bukić	D	1.95 m (6 ft 5 in)	90 kg (198 lb)	30 April 1994	(Croatia) HAVK Mladost
7	Xavier García	CF	1.98 m (6 ft 6 in)	92 kg (203 lb)	5 January 1984	(Croatia) Primorje Rijeka
8	Andro Bušlje	CB	2.00 m (6 ft 7 in)	115 kg (254 lb)	4 January 1986	(Italy) Posillipo
9	Sandro Sukno	CF	2.00 m (6 ft 7 in)	93 kg (205 lb)	30 June 1990	(Italy) Pro Recco
10	Ivan Krapić	CF	1.94 m (6 ft 4 in)	103 kg (227 lb)	14 February 1989	(Croatia) Primorje Rijeka
11	Anđelo Šetka	D	1.86 m (6 ft 1 in)	87 kg (192 lb)	14 September 1985	(Croatia) Primorje Rijeka
12	Marko Macan	CB	1.96 m (6 ft 5 in)	109 kg (240 lb)	26 April 1993	(Croatia) Jug Dubrovnik
13	Marko Bijač	GK	2.01 m (6 ft 7 in)	85 kg (187 lb)	12 January 1991	(Croatia) Jug Dubrovnik

Group play

Pos	Team	Pld	W	D	L	GF	GA	GD	Pts	Qualification
1	Spain	5	3	1	1	46	35	+11	7	Quarter-finals
2	Croatia	5	3	0	2	37	37	0	6	Quarter-finals
3	Italy	5	3	0	2	40	41	−1	6	Quarter-finals
4	Montenegro	5	2	1	2	36	32	+4	5	Quarter-finals
5	United States	5	2	0	3	35	35	0	4	
6	France	5	1	0	4	28	42	−14	2	

Source: Rio2016
Rules for classification: 1) Points; 2) Head-to-head points; 3) Head-to-head goal difference; 4) Head-to-head goals scored; 5) Goal difference.

6 August 2016; 10:20	Report	United States	5–7	Croatia	Maria Lenk Aquatic Center, Rio de Janeiro; Referees: Boris Margeta (SLO), Daniel Flahive (AUS)
6 August 2016; 10:20	Report	Score by quarters: 2–2, 1–1, 1–2, 1–2			Maria Lenk Aquatic Center, Rio de Janeiro; Referees: Boris Margeta (SLO), Daniel Flahive (AUS)
6 August 2016; 10:20	Report	Azevedo 2	Goals	Joković, Šetka 2	Maria Lenk Aquatic Center, Rio de Janeiro; Referees: Boris Margeta (SLO), Daniel Flahive (AUS)

8 August 2016; 20:50	Report	Croatia	8–7	Montenegro	Maria Lenk Aquatic Center, Rio de Janeiro; Referees: Georgios Stavridis (GRE), Daniel Flahive (AUS)
8 August 2016; 20:50	Report	Score by quarters: 2–2, 2–1, 1–2, 3–2			Maria Lenk Aquatic Center, Rio de Janeiro; Referees: Georgios Stavridis (GRE), Daniel Flahive (AUS)
8 August 2016; 20:50	Report	three players 2	Goals	Brguljan, Janović 2	Maria Lenk Aquatic Center, Rio de Janeiro; Referees: Georgios Stavridis (GRE), Daniel Flahive (AUS)

10 August 2016; 20:50	Report	Spain	9–4	Croatia	Maria Lenk Aquatic Center, Rio de Janeiro; Referees: Boris Margeta (SLO), Radosław Koryzna (POL)
10 August 2016; 20:50	Report	Score by quarters: 2–0, 2–1, 1–2, 4–1			Maria Lenk Aquatic Center, Rio de Janeiro; Referees: Boris Margeta (SLO), Radosław Koryzna (POL)
10 August 2016; 20:50	Report	Echenique 4	Goals	four players 1	Maria Lenk Aquatic Center, Rio de Janeiro; Referees: Boris Margeta (SLO), Radosław Koryzna (POL)

12 August 2016; 10:20	Report	Croatia	10–7	Italy	Maria Lenk Aquatic Center, Rio de Janeiro; Referees: Mark Koganov (AZE), Daniel Flahive (AUS)
12 August 2016; 10:20	Report	Score by quarters: 1–1, 4–3, 3–2, 2–1			Maria Lenk Aquatic Center, Rio de Janeiro; Referees: Mark Koganov (AZE), Daniel Flahive (AUS)
12 August 2016; 10:20	Report	Sukno 5	Goals	Gallo 2	Maria Lenk Aquatic Center, Rio de Janeiro; Referees: Mark Koganov (AZE), Daniel Flahive (AUS)

14 August 2016; 16:50	Report	France	9–8	Croatia	Olympic Aquatics Stadium, Rio de Janeiro; Referees: Ni Shi Wei (CHN), Hatem Gaber (EGY)
14 August 2016; 16:50	Report	Score by quarters: 3–2, 3–3, 2–1, 1–2			Olympic Aquatics Stadium, Rio de Janeiro; Referees: Ni Shi Wei (CHN), Hatem Gaber (EGY)
14 August 2016; 16:50	Report	Marzouki 3	Goals	Sukno 3	Olympic Aquatics Stadium, Rio de Janeiro; Referees: Ni Shi Wei (CHN), Hatem Gaber (EGY)

Quarterfinal

16 August 2016; 15:10	Report	Brazil	6–10	Croatia	Olympic Aquatics Stadium, Rio de Janeiro; Referees: Adrian Alexandrescu (ROU), Benjamin Mercier (FRA)
16 August 2016; 15:10	Report	Score by quarters: 2–3, 1–4, 3–1, 0–2			Olympic Aquatics Stadium, Rio de Janeiro; Referees: Adrian Alexandrescu (ROU), Benjamin Mercier (FRA)
16 August 2016; 15:10	Report	Gomes 3	Goals	García, Joković 3	Olympic Aquatics Stadium, Rio de Janeiro; Referees: Adrian Alexandrescu (ROU), Benjamin Mercier (FRA)

Semifinal

18 August 2016; 12:20	Report	Montenegro	8–12	Croatia	Olympic Aquatics Stadium, Rio de Janeiro; Referees: Adrian Alexandrescu (ROU), Joseph Peila (USA)
18 August 2016; 12:20	Report	Score by quarters: 3–4, 2–3, 1–1, 2–4			Olympic Aquatics Stadium, Rio de Janeiro; Referees: Adrian Alexandrescu (ROU), Joseph Peila (USA)
18 August 2016; 12:20	Report	Brguljan, Ivović 3	Goals	Bušlje 4	Olympic Aquatics Stadium, Rio de Janeiro; Referees: Adrian Alexandrescu (ROU), Joseph Peila (USA)

Gold medal match

20 August 2016; 17:50	Report	Croatia	7–11	Serbia	Olympic Aquatics Stadium, Rio de Janeiro; Referees: Georgios Stavridis (GRE), Péter Molnár (HUN)
20 August 2016; 17:50	Report	Score by quarters: 2–3, 1–3, 2–3, 2–2			Olympic Aquatics Stadium, Rio de Janeiro; Referees: Georgios Stavridis (GRE), Péter Molnár (HUN)
20 August 2016; 17:50	Report	Sukno 3	Goals	Mandić 4	Olympic Aquatics Stadium, Rio de Janeiro; Referees: Georgios Stavridis (GRE), Péter Molnár (HUN)

== Weightlifting ==
For the first time since 2004, Croatia has received an unused quota place from IWF to send a male weightlifter to the Olympics, as a response to the complete ban of the Russian weightlifting team from the Games due to "multiple positive" cases of doping.

Athlete	Event	Snatch		Clean & jerk		Total	Rank
Athlete	Event	Result	Rank	Result	Rank	Total	Rank
Amar Musić	Men's −85 kg	150	15	186	14	336	14

== Wrestling ==
Croatia has received a spare host berth freed up by Brazil as the next highest-ranked eligible nation, not yet qualified, to send a wrestler competing in the men's Greco-Roman 75 kg to the Olympics, based on the results from the World Championships.

Key:

- VT – Victory by Fall.
- PP – Decision by Points – the loser with technical points.
- PO – Decision by Points – the loser without technical points.
- ST – Decision by points – the loser without technical points and a margin of victory of at least 8 (Greco-Roman) or 10 (freestyle) points.

Men's Greco-Roman

Athlete	Event	Qualification	Round of 16	Quarterfinal	Semifinal	Repechage 1	Repechage 2	Final / BM	
Athlete	Event	Opposition Result	Opposition Result	Opposition Result	Opposition Result	Opposition Result	Opposition Result	Opposition Result	Rank
Božo Starčević	−75 kg	Bye	Çebi (TUR); W 3–1 ^{PP}	Bisek (USA); W 3–0 ^{PO}	Vlasov (RUS); L 1–3 ^{PP}	Bye		Kim H-w (KOR); L 1–3 ^{PP}	5
