= Efstathios Papadopoulos =

Greek yacht racer

Personal information
- Nickname: Stathios
- Nationality: Greece
- Born: 24 April 1989 (age 37) Marousi, Greece
- Height: 1.85 m (6 ft 1 in)
- Weight: 74 kg (163 lb)

Sailing career
- Sport: Sailing
- Class: Dinghy

Efstathios "Stathis" Papadopoulos (Greek: Σταθης Παπαδοπουλος; born 24 April 1989 in Marousi) is a Greek sailor, who specialized in two-person dinghy (470) class. He represented his nation Greece, along with his partner Panagiotis Kampouridis, at the 2012 Summer Olympics, and also obtained a top nine finish at the World Championships in Barcelona, Spain.

Papadopoulos qualified as a crew member for the Greek squad in the men's 470 class at the 2012 Summer Olympics in London when he and Kampouridis secured selection over their rivals Panagiotis Mantis and Pavlos Kagkialis by finishing ninth from the World Championships in Barcelona, Spain. At the 2012 Olympics, he teamed up with skipper Kampouridis in the opening series, and the Greek duo sailed their way smoothly to the top in the early races, but an infringement protest by the British team of Luke Patience and Stuart Bithell lead to a penalty on the sixth leg which dropped them to nineteenth overall with a final score of 148.
