= Kim Chang-ju =

Kim Chang-ju may refer to:

- Kim Chang-ju (sailor)
- Kim Chang-ju (film editor)
