= Natthaphong Phonoppharat =

Thai windsurfer (born 1988)

Personal information
- Born: 16 May 1988 (age 38) Pattaya, Thailand
- Height: 177 cm (5 ft 10 in)
- Weight: 72 kg (159 lb)

Sailing career
- Sport: Sailing
- Club: Pattaya Windsurfing Club
- Class: RS:X
Medal record
Men's sailing
Representing Thailand
Asian Games
| Silver medal – second place | 2014 Incheon | Mistral |
Southeast Asian Games
| Gold medal – first place | 2007 Nakhon Ratchasima | RS:X |

Natthaphong Phonoppharat (Thai: ณัฐพงษ์ โพธิ์นพรัตน์, born 16 May 1988) is a Thai competitive windsurfer. He competed at the 2016 Summer Olympics in Rio de Janeiro, in the men's RS:X.
