= Igor Marenić =

Croatian sailor (born 1986)

Personal information
- Nationality: Croatia
- Born: 2 January 1986 (age 40) Mali Lošinj, SR Croatia, SFR Yugoslavia

Sailing career
- Sport: Sailing
- Coached by: Edo Fantela
- Class: 470
Medal record
Sailing
Representing Croatia
Olympic Games
Gold medal – first place	2016 Rio de Janeiro	470
World Championships
Gold medal – first place	2009 Rungsted	470
Gold medal – first place	2016 San Isidro	470
Silver medal – second place	2014 Santander	470
Silver medal – second place	2015 Haifa	470
Bronze medal – third place	2010 The Hague	470
Bronze medal – third place	2011 Perth	470
Bronze medal – third place	2012 Barcelona	470
European Championships
Gold medal – first place	2009 Traunsee	470
Gold medal – first place	2011 Helsinki	470
Gold medal – first place	2012 Largs	470
Bronze medal – third place	2013 Formia	470
Bronze medal – third place	2014 Athens	470
Universiade
Gold medal – first place	2005 İzmir	470
Mediterranean Games
Gold medal – first place	2013 Mersin	470
Silver medal – second place	2009 Pescara	470

Igor Marenić (born 2 January 1986) is a Croatian professional sailor. Competing in the 470 class with Šime Fantela, he won gold at the 2016 Summer Olympics, the 2009 World Championships, and three European Championships (2009, 2011, 2012).

== Life and career ==
A resident of Zadar, where he moved in 2001, Marenić was born in Mali Lošinj, Croatia, and is originally from Cres. He started sailing in his native Cres with JK Reful in 1995, in the Optimist class. He trained in his native city, and on the day he turned 24, Marenić was awarded by the city of Cres one of its greatest recognitions, Pro Insula, for achievements and contribution of importance for the development of the City of Cres, and especially for the exceptional sports results achieved in sailing. From 1998 to 2001 he was a member of the Croatian national team, and in 2000 he was fifth at the World Championships. In 1999 he competed in the Optimist World Championship in Martinique.

At the 470 World Championships in 2009 in Rungsted, Fantela and Marenić became the first Croatians to win a gold medal at the ISAF World Championships. In 2011 in Helsinki, the two won gold in the 470 class at the European Championships.

Marenić competed at the 2008 and 2012 Summer Olympics in the men's 470 class event, both times competing with Fantela.

== Acknowledgements ==
- Order of Danica Hrvatska with face of Franjo Bučar: 2016
- City of Zadar Award: 2005, 2009, 2016
