= Pavlo Matsuyev =

Ukrainian sailor

Pavlo Matsuyev (born 5 November 1990) is a Ukrainian sailor. He and Borys Shvets placed 25th in the men's 470 event at the 2016 Summer Olympics.
