= Denis Gribanov =

Russian sailor

Denis Belyanovich Gribanov (Russian: Денис Белянович Грибанов; born 3 June 1986) is a Russian sailor. He and Pavel Sozykin placed 13th in the men's 470 event at the 2016 Summer Olympics.
