= Kimihiko Imamura =

Japanese sailor (born 1984)

Personal information
- Born: February 3, 1984 (age 42) Kagoshima City, Kagoshima Prefecture, Japan
- Height: 180 cm (5 ft 11 in)

Sailing career
- Sport: Sailing
- Club: JR Kyushu
- Class: 470
Medal record
Men's sailing
Representing Japan
Asian Games
Silver medal – second place	2014 Incheon	470

Kimihiko Imamura (今村 公彦, Imamura Kimihiko; born February 3, 1984) is a Japanese sailor.

== Career ==
In 2014, he and Kazuto Doi won silver in the men's 470 event at the 2014 Asian Games.

He and Kazuto Doi placed 17th in the men's 470 event at the 2016 Summer Olympics.
