= Yurie Seki =

Japanese sailor

Personal information
- Nationality: Japanese
- Born: 15 April 1994 (age 32) Kagawa Prefecture, Japan
- Education: Kwansei Gakuin University

Sport
- Sport: Sailing
Medal record
Sailing
Representing Japan
Asian Games
Gold medal – first place	2026 Aichi-Nagoya	Mixed 470
World Sailing Championships
Bronze medal – third place	2023 The Hague	Mixed 470

Yurie Seki (Japanese: 関友里恵; born 15 April 1994) is a Japanese sailor who competes in the 470 class. She won the gold medal in the mixed 470 event at the 2026 Asian Games in Aichi-Nagoya with Tetsuya Isozaki. She also won a bronze medal in the mixed 470 event at the 2023 Sailing World Championships.

== Career ==
Seki began sailing while attending Takamatsu Commercial High School in Kagawa Prefecture. She later attended Kwansei Gakuin University, where she competed in university sailing and won the All-Japan Women's Intercollegiate Sailing Championships in 2014 and 2015. She was also selected to represent Japan at the 470 Junior World Championships.

In 2016, Seki joined the Yamaha Sailing Team and began competing in the 470 class. The following year, she won the women's 470 event at the All Japan Women's 470 Class Sailing Championships.

Seki subsequently took a break from elite sailing before returning to competition with Tetsuya Isozaki in the mixed 470 class. In 2023, the pair won the bronze medal at the 2023 Sailing World Championships in The Hague.

In 2024, Seki and Isozaki competed together in international mixed 470 events, including the Playa Blanca Sailing Series in Spain and the 470 World Championships. Seki also continued competing in the women's 470 class in Japan.

In 2025, Seki and Isozaki won the All Japan 470 Class Sailing Championships. The pair also competed in other domestic and international regattas during the year.

In 2026, Seki and Isozaki finished fourth at the 470 World Championships at Enoshima Yacht Harbor in Fujisawa, Japan. Later that year, they represented Japan in the mixed 470 event at the 2026 Asian Games in Aichi-Nagoya. The pair took the overall lead after winning both races on the opening day and maintained their position throughout the regatta. They subsequently won the gold medal in the event, giving Seki her first Asian Games medal.
