= Sailing at the 2014 Asian Games – Men's Mistral =

Men's Mistral at the 2014 Asian Games
- Venue: Wangsan Marina
- Date: 24–30 September 2014
- Competitors: 7 from 7 nations

Medalists
gold medal	Cheng Kwok Fai	Hong Kong
silver medal	Natthaphong Phonoppharat	Thailand
bronze medal	Shi Chuankun	China

The men's Mistral competition at the 2014 Asian Games in Incheon was held from 24 to 30 September 2014.

== Schedule ==
All times are Korea Standard Time (UTC+09:00)

Date	Time	Event
Wednesday, 24 September 2014	12:00	Race 1
Wednesday, 24 September 2014	12:00	Race 2
Wednesday, 24 September 2014	12:00	Race 3
Thursday, 25 September 2014	11:00	Race 4
Thursday, 25 September 2014	11:00	Race 5
Thursday, 25 September 2014	11:00	Race 6
Friday, 26 September 2014	11:00	Race 7
Friday, 26 September 2014	11:00	Race 8
Saturday, 27 September 2014	11:00	Race 9
Saturday, 27 September 2014	11:00	Race 10
Tuesday, 30 September 2014	11:00	Race 11
Tuesday, 30 September 2014	11:00	Race 12

== Results ==
Rank	Athlete	Race												Total
Rank	Athlete	1	2	3	4	5	6	7	8	9	10	11	12	Total
1st place, gold medalist(s)	Cheng Kwok Fai (HKG)	1	1	1	1	1	~~(2)~~	1	1	2	1	1	1	12
2nd place, silver medalist(s)	Natthaphong Phonoppharat (THA)	3	2	3	2	2	1	5	~~(7)~~	3	2	2	2	27
3rd place, bronze medalist(s)	Shi Chuankun (CHN)	~~(6)~~	3	5	4	4	4	2	2	1	4	3	4	36
4	Seo Dong-woo (KOR)	2	4	2	3	5	5	4	4	~~(6)~~	6	4	5	44
5	Gede Subagiasa (INA)	4	~~(6)~~	4	5	3	3	6	3	5	5	6	3	47
6	Geylord Coveta (PHI)	5	~~(7)~~	6	6	6	7	3	5	4	3	5	6	56
7	Chameera Lakshan (SRI)	~~(7)~~	5	7	7	7	6	7	6	7	7	7	7	73
