= Wang Wei (sailor) =

Chinese sailor

Wang Wei (born July 7, 1988) is a Chinese sailor. He and Xu Zangjun placed 18th in the men's 470 event at the 2016 Summer Olympics.
