= Borys Shvets =

Ukrainian sailor

Personal information
- Born: 20 August 1991 (age 34) Kyiv, Ukraine
- Height: 181 cm (5 ft 11 in)
- Weight: 71 kg (157 lb)

Sport
- Sport: Sailing

Sailing career
- Club: Kyiv ShVSM

Achievements and titles
- Olympic finals: 2016 Rio de Janeiro (25th)
Medal record
Men's Sailing
Representing Ukraine

Borys Shvets (born 20 August 1991) is a Ukrainian sailor. He and Pavlo Matsuyev placed 25th in the men's 470 event at the 2016 Summer Olympics.
