= Sailing at the 2014 Asian Games – Men's 470 =

Men's 470 at the 2014 Asian Games
- Venue: Wangsan Marina
- Date: 24–30 September 2014
- Competitors: 12 from 6 nations

Medalists
| gold medal | Kim Chang-ju; Kim Ji-hoon | South Korea |
| silver medal | Kazuto Doi; Kimihiko Imamura | Japan |
| bronze medal | Lan Hao; Wang Chao | China |

The men's 470 competition at the 2014 Asian Games in Incheon was held from 24 to 30 September 2014.

== Schedule ==
All times are Korea Standard Time (UTC+09:00)

| Date | Time | Event |
|---|---|---|
| Wednesday, 24 September 2014 | 12:00 | Race 1 |
| Wednesday, 24 September 2014 | 12:00 | Race 2 |
| Wednesday, 24 September 2014 | 12:00 | Race 3 |
| Wednesday, 24 September 2014 | 12:00 | Race 4 |
| Thursday, 25 September 2014 | 11:00 | Race 5 |
| Friday, 26 September 2014 | 11:00 | Race 6 |
| Friday, 26 September 2014 | 11:00 | Race 7 |
| Friday, 26 September 2014 | 11:00 | Race 8 |
| Saturday, 27 September 2014 | 11:00 | Race 9 |
| Saturday, 27 September 2014 | 11:00 | Race 10 |
| Tuesday, 30 September 2014 | 11:00 | Race 11 |
| Tuesday, 30 September 2014 | 11:00 | Race 12 |

== Results ==
Legend

- DSQ — Disqualification

| Rank | Team | Race | | | | | | | | | | | | Total |
| Rank | Team | 1 | 2 | 3 | 4 | 5 | 6 | 7 | 8 | 9 | 10 | 11 | 12 | Total |
|---|---|---|---|---|---|---|---|---|---|---|---|---|---|---|
| 1st place, gold medalist(s) | South Korea (KOR); Kim Chang-ju; Kim Ji-hoon | 3 | 1 | 3 | 2 | 2 | 2 | 3 | 1 | 3 | ~~(6)~~ | 1 | 3 | 24 |
| 2nd place, silver medalist(s) | Japan (JPN); Kazuto Doi; Kimihiko Imamura | 1 | 3 | 4 | 1 | 1 | 1 | 2 | 3 | ~~(7)~~; DSQ | 3 | 4 | 2 | 25 |
| 3rd place, bronze medalist(s) | China (CHN); Lan Hao; Wang Chao | 4 | 2 | 1 | ~~(5)~~ | 5 | 3 | 1 | 5 | 4 | 1 | 5 | 4 | 35 |
| 4 | Thailand (THA); Navee Thamsoontorn; Nut Butmarasri | 2 | 4 | 5 | 3 | ~~(6)~~ | 4 | 4 | 2 | 2 | 2 | 2 | 5 | 35 |
| 5 | Malaysia (MAS); Ku Anas Ku Zamil; Hafizzudin Mazelan | ~~(6)~~ | 6 | 2 | 4 | 3 | 5 | 5 | 4 | 1 | 5 | 3 | 1 | 39 |
| 6 | Philippines (PHI); Ridgely Balladares; Whok Dimapilis | 5 | 5 | 6 | 6 | 4 | 6 | 6 | 6 | 5 | 4 | 6 | 6 | 59 |
