= Šime Fantela =

Croatian sailor (born 1986)

Personal information
- Nationality: Croatia
- Born: 19 January 1986 (age 40) Zadar, SR Croatia, SFR Yugoslavia
- Height: 1.83 m (6 ft 0 in)
- Weight: 67 kg (148 lb)

Sailing career
- Sport: Sailing
- Club: JK Sv. Krševan
- Coached by: Edo Fantela
- Class(es): 470, 49er
Medal record
Sailing
Representing Croatia
Olympic Games
Gold medal – first place	2016 Rio de Janeiro	470
World Championships
Gold medal – first place	2000 La Coruna	Optimist
Gold medal – first place	2009 Rungsted	470
Gold medal – first place	2016 San Isidro	470
Gold medal – first place	2018 Aarhus	49er
Silver medal – second place	2014 Santander	470
Silver medal – second place	2015 Haifa	470
Bronze medal – third place	2010 The Hague	470
Bronze medal – third place	2011 Perth	470
Bronze medal – third place	2012 Barcelona	470
Gold medal – first place	2000 La Coruna	Optimist
Bronze medal – third place	1998 Tróia	Optimist
European Championships
Gold medal – first place	2009 Traunsee	470
Gold medal – first place	2011 Helsinki	470
Gold medal – first place	2012 Largs	470
Bronze medal – third place	2013 Formia	470
Bronze medal – third place	2014 Athens	470
Universiade
Gold medal – first place	2005 İzmir	470
Mediterranean Games
Gold medal – first place	2013 Mersin	470
Silver medal – second place	2009 Pescara	470

Šime Fantela (born 19 January 1986) is a Croatian professional sailor. Competing in the 470 class with Igor Marenić, he won gold at the 2016 Summer Olympics, the 2009 World Championships, and three European Championships (2009, 2011, 2012). At the 470 World Championships in 2009 in Rungsted, Fantela and Marenić became the first Croatians to win a gold medal at the ISAF World Championships.

Šime and his younger brother Mihovil Fantela competed for Croatia at the 2020 Summer Olympics in the 49er event, and again in the same event at the 2024 Summer Olympics.

== Career ==
=== Early career ===
Fantela began sailing at the age of six. He competed in Optimist World Championship class winning bronze in 1998 and gold in 2000.

After the early successes in Optimist, he switched to the 470 class with his colleague Igor Marenić. In six junior years in 470, they have won plenty of medals. They have become World Junior Champions on three occasions (2003, 2005 and 2007). They also won silver medal in 2006 and a bronze medal in 2004. At the European Junior Championships, they have won three medals; gold in 2005 and two silver medals (in 2002 and 2006). They won gold medal at the 2005 Summer Universiade in İzmir, Turkey. At their first Mediterranean Games they finished 4th.

Their first bigger success among the seniors came in 2006 when they finished fifth at the World Championships. One year later, at the 2007 World Championships they finished sixth and earned an Olympic quota place for 2008 Summer Olympics becoming the fourth Croatian crew to qualify for the Olympics in 470 class.

=== 2008 Summer Olympics ===
Fantela and Marenić were selected to represent Croatia at the 2008 Summer Olympics. At the regatta held in Qingdao International Marina between 11 and 18 August, they have finished ninth overall among 29 crews with 107 net points. They have won tenth race and finished in top 10 on four other occasions. In the medal race, they claimed eight place. Overall, Fantela was pleased with their performance at the 2008 Olympics: "We were hoping for top 10 position and we reached it". At the time, ninth place have been the best Croatian result in 470 at the Olympics.

=== Senior Breakthrough (2009–2012) ===
After the post-Olympic break, Fantela and Marenić began their campaign towards 2012 Summer Olympics. They won gold medal at the 2009 European Championships in Traunsee, Austria. They have become the first European Champions in Olympic classes from Croatia since 1978. At the 2009 Mediterranean Games in Pescara they won silver medal. Successes from 2009 were crowned at the 470 World Championships in Rungsted when Fantela and Marenić became first Croatian World Champions in Olympic sailing.

In 2010, Fantela and Marenić went on to defend their World title. At the World Championships in The Hague they have won bronze medal though. They finished sixth at the European Championships in Istanbul.

At the 2011 European Championships in Helsinki, Fantela and Marenić regained European title in tight competition with British and Israeli crews. 2011 ISAF Sailing World Championships were held at the end of the year in Perth. Fantela and Marenić defended bronze medal from 2010 470 World Championships and secured an Olympic quota place for the 2012 Summer Olympics. At the 2012 Summer Olympics Fantela and Marenić finished in 6th place.

== Acknowledgements ==
- Order of Danica Hrvatska with face of Franjo Bučar: 2016
- City of Zadar Award: 2005, 2009, 2016, 2018
