= Panagiotis Kampouridis =

Greek sailor

Personal information
- Nationality: Greece
- Born: 17 March 1983 (age 43) Marousi, Greece
- Height: 1.81 m (5 ft 11 1/2 in)
- Weight: 65 kg (143 lb)

Sailing career
- Sport: Sailing
- Class: Dinghy

Panagiotis Kampouridis (Greek: Παναγιωτης Καμπουριδης; born 17 March 1983 in Marousi) is a Greek sailor, who specialized in two-person dinghy (470) class. He represented his nation Greece, along with his partner Efstathios Papadopoulos, at the 2012 Summer Olympics, and also obtained a top nine finish at the World Championships in Barcelona, Spain.

Kampouridis qualified as a skipper for the Greek squad in the men's 470 class at the 2012 Summer Olympics in London by having secured a selection over their rivals Panagiotis Mantis and Pavlos Kagkialis and finishing ninth from the World Championships in Barcelona, Spain. Teaming up with skipper Kampouridis in the opening series, the Greek duo sailed their way smoothly to the top in the early races, but an infringement protest by the British team of Luke Patience and Stuart Bithell due to penalty on the sixth leg dropped them to nineteenth overall with a final grade of 148.
