= Pavel Sozykin =

Russian sailor

Medal record

Men's sailing

Representing Russia

Military World Games
Silver medal – second place	2019 Wuhan	Mixed 470

Pavel Valeryevich Sozykin (Russian: Павел Валерьевич Созыкин; born 25 December 1987) is a Russian sailor. He and Denis Gribanov placed 13th in the men's 470 event at the 2016 Summer Olympics. Sozykin had initially been banned from the Games after his name was included in a World Anti-Doping Agency report on doping in Russia; he was cleared to participate before his event began.
