= Oliver Szymanski =

German sailor

Personal information
- Nationality: German
- Born: 27 July 1990 (age 35)
- Height: 1.83 m (6 ft 0 in)
- Weight: 73 kg (161 lb)

Sailing career
- Sport: Sailing
- Class: Dinghy

Oliver Szymanski (born 27 July 1990) is a German sailor who specializes in the 470 (dinghy) class. He represented Germany, along with partner Ferdinand Gerz, in men's 470 class at the 2016 Summer Olympics in Rio de Janeiro. They finished in 11th place.
