= Kazuto Doi =

Japanese sailor (born 1992)

Personal information
- Born: March 17, 1992 (age 34) Yokohama, Japan

Sailing career
- Sport: Sailing
Medal record
Men's sailing
Representing Japan
Asian Games
Silver medal – second place	2014 Incheon	470

Kazuto Doi (土居 一斗, Doi Kazuto; born March 17, 1992) is a Japanese sailor. He and Kimihiko Imamura placed 17th in the men's 470 event at the 2016 Summer Olympics.
