= Kim Ji-hoon (sailor) =

South Korean sailor (born 1985)

Personal information
- Born: June 27, 1985 (age 41) Busan, South Korea
- Height: 179 cm (5 ft 10 in)
- Weight: 75 kg (165 lb)

Sailing career
- Sport: Sailing
- Class: 470
Medal record
Men's sailing
Representing South Korea
Asian Games
| Gold medal – first place | 2014 Incheon | 470 |

Kim Ji-hoon (Korean: 김지훈, also known as Kim Ji-hun, born June 27, 1985) is a South Korean sailor. He and Kim Chang-ju placed 19th in the men's 470 event at the 2016 Summer Olympics.
