= Yannick Brauchli =

Swiss sailor (born 1988)

Personal information
- Nickname: Yane
- Nationality: Switzerland
- Born: 30 July 1988 (age 37) Zürich, Switzerland
- Height: 1.74 m (5 ft 8 1/2 in)
- Weight: 64 kg (141 lb)

Sailing career
- Sport: Sailing
- Club: Segel Club Enge
- Coached by: Nicolas Novara
- Class: Dinghy

Yannick Brauchli (born 30 July 1988 in Zürich) is a Swiss sailor, who specializes in two-person dinghy (470) class. He represented Switzerland, along with his partner Romuald Hausser, at the 2012 Summer Olympics, and has also been training for Segel Club Enge throughout most of his sporting career under his personal coach Nicolas Novara. As of September 2014, Brauchli is ranked sixteenth in the world for two-person dinghy class by the International Sailing Federation, following his successes at the North American Championships, European Championships and ISAF Sailing World Cup Series.

Brauchli qualified for the Swiss squad in the men's 470 class at the 2012 Summer Olympics in London by placing twenty-sixth and receiving a berth due to his result at the ISAF World Championships in Perth, Western Australia. Teaming with crew member Romuald Hausser in the opening series at the 2012 Olympics, the Swiss duo recorded a score of 119 net points to establish a sixteenth-place finish in a fleet of twenty-seven boats.

The team also competed at the 2016 Olympics, this time, reaching the medal race. They finished in 9th.
