= Romuald Hausser =

Swiss sailor (born 1988)

Personal information
- Nationality: Switzerland
- Born: 16 April 1988 (age 38) Geneva, Switzerland
- Height: 1.85 m (6 ft 1 in)
- Weight: 71 kg (157 lb)

Sailing career
- Sport: Sailing
- Club: Club Nautique de Versoix
- Coached by: Nicolas Novara
- Class: Dinghy

Romuald Hausser (born 16 April 1988 in Geneva) is a Swiss sailor, who specialized in two-person dinghy (470) class. He represented Switzerland, along with his partner Yannick Brauchli, at the 2012 Summer Olympics, and has also been training for Versoix Nautical Club (French: Club Nautique de Versoix) throughout most of his sporting career under his personal coach Nicolas Novara. As of September 2014, Hausser is ranked sixteenth in the world for two-person dinghy class by the International Sailing Federation, following his successes at the North American Championships, European Championships and ISAF Sailing World Cup Series.

Hausser qualified as a crew member for the Swiss squad in the men's 470 class at the 2012 Summer Olympics in London by placing twenty-sixth at the ISAF World Championships in Perth, Western Australia. Teaming with skipper Yannick Brauchli in the opening series, the Swiss duo recorded a score of 119 net points to establish a sixteenth-place finish in a fleet of twenty-seven boats.

The pair also competed at the 2016 Summer Olympics, finishing in 9th place.
