= Panagiotis Mantis =

Greek sailor

Personal information
- Nationality: Greek
- Born: 30 September 1981 (age 44)
- Height: 170 cm (5 ft 7 in)
- Weight: 65 kg (143 lb)

Sailing career
- Sport: Sailing
Medal record
Olympic Games
Bronze medal – third place	2016 Rio de Janeiro	470
World Championships
Gold medal – first place	2008	Platu 25
Gold medal – first place	2010	Platu 25
Bronze medal – third place	2013 La Rochelle	470
Bronze medal – third place	2014 Santander	470
Mediterranean Games
Silver medal – second place	2013 Mersin	470

Panagiotis Mantis (born 30 September 1981) is a Greek competitive sailor.

He competed at the 2016 Summer Olympics in Rio de Janeiro in the men's 470, along with Pavlos Kagialis, winning the bronze medal.

Mantis and Kagialis also won the bronze medal at the 470 World Championships in 2013, while they took another time the third place at the 2014 World Championships in Santander. They were second at the 2013 Mediterranean Games in Mersin.

At the 2020 Summer Olympics, in Tokyo, he participated along with Kagialis and took the eighth place.
