= Pavlos Kagialis =

Greek Professional Sailor

Personal information
- Nationality: Greek
- Born: 14 July 1984 (age 41) Thessaloniki
- Height: 184 cm (6 ft 0 in)
- Weight: 85 kg (187 lb)

Sailing career
- Country: Greece
- Sport: Sailing
- Club: Piraeus Sailing Club
- Team: MK SAILING TEAM

Achievements and titles
- Highest world ranking: 1st
Medal record
Olympic Games
Bronze medal – third place	2016 Rio de Janeiro	470
World Championships
Bronze medal – third place	2013 La Rochelle	470
Bronze medal – third place	2014 Santander	470
Mediterranean Games
Silver medal – second place	2013 Mersin	470

Pavlos Kagialis (born 14 July 1984) is a Greek competitive sailor.

He competed at the 2016 Summer Olympics in Rio de Janeiro, in the men's 470 taking the third place, along with Panagiotis Mantis.

Kagialis and Mantis won the bronze medal at the 470 World Championships in 2013, and the couple again took the third place at the 2014 World Championships in Santander. They were second at the 2013 Mediterranean Games in Mersin.

At the 2020 Summer Olympics, in Tokyo, he participated along with Mantis and took the eighth place.
