= Wang Chao (sailor) =

Chinese sailor

Personal information
- Nationality: Chinese
- Born: 11 October 1985 (age 39)

Sport
- Sport: Sailing

Wang Chao (born 11 October 1985) is a Chinese sailor. He won a bronze medal at the 2014 Asian Games in the men's 470 event. Four years later, at the 2018 Asian Games, he won the silver medal in the same event.
