= Tetsuya Isozaki =

Japanese sailor

Personal information
- Nationality: Japanese
- Born: 4 April 1992 (age 34)
- Education: Nippon Economics University

Sport
- Sport: Sailing
Medal record
Sailing
Representing Japan
World Sailing Championships
Bronze medal – third place	2023 The Hague	Mixed 470
Asian Games
Gold medal – first place	2026 Aichi-Nagoya	Mixed 470

Tetsuya Isozaki (Japanese: 磯崎哲也; born 4 April 1992) is a Japanese sailor who competes in the 470 class. He won the gold medal in the mixed 470 event at the 2026 Asian Games in Aichi-Nagoya with Yurie Seki. He previously won a bronze medal in the mixed 470 event at the 2023 Sailing World Championships.

== Career ==
Isozaki competed in sailing from a young age and developed through the 420 and 470 classes. He represented Nippon Economics University and later competed internationally in the 470 class. He has been associated with the Yamaha Sailing Team and subsequently competed as part of JPN22 Racing.

In 2022, Isozaki began competing with Yurie Seki in the mixed 470 class. The pair competed internationally as they prepared for the Olympic cycle, including appearances at the Princess Sofia Trophy and other major international regattas.

In 2023, Isozaki and Seki won the bronze medal in the mixed 470 event at the 2023 Sailing World Championships in The Hague. They finished behind the Japanese gold-medal-winning team of Keiju Okada and Miho Yoshioka and a Spanish team.

The pair also finished runner-up at the 2023 All Japan 470 Class Sailing Championships. Their result followed a strong season in which they also competed at the 470 European Championships and the French Olympic Week.

In 2024, Isozaki and Seki competed in the 470 World Championships in Spain, where they finished eighth. They also competed at the Princess Sofia Trophy as part of Japan's Olympic selection process.

In 2025, Isozaki and Seki won the All Japan 470 Class Sailing Championships at Enoshima Yacht Harbor. Competing for JPN22 Racing, they finished first overall after the final series and secured the team's first national championship title.

In August 2026, Isozaki and Seki finished fourth at the 470 World Championships held at Enoshima Yacht Harbor in Fujisawa, Japan.

Later in 2026, Isozaki and Seki represented Japan in the mixed 470 event at the 2026 Asian Games in Aichi-Nagoya. They won both races on the opening day and took the overall lead. They remained first overall after five races, with the pair recording finishes of third, second and first in the three races completed on 28 September. On 2 October, Isozaki and Seki won the gold medal in the mixed 470 event.
