= Xu Zangjun =

Chinese sailor

Xu Zangjun (simplified Chinese: 徐臧军; traditional Chinese: 徐臧軍; born February 6, 1992) is a Chinese sailor. He and Wang Wei competed in the 470 events at the 2016 and 2020 Summer Olympics. He also competed at the 2024 Olympics in the newly mixed gender 470 event alongside Lü Yixiao.
