= Kim Chang-ju (sailor) =

South Korean sailor (born 1985)

Personal information
- Born: September 20, 1985 (age 40) Yeosu, South Korea
- Height: 178 cm (5 ft 10 in)
- Weight: 69 kg (152 lb)

Sailing career
- Sport: Sailing
- Classes: 470, 29er, 420
Medal record
Men's sailing
Representing South Korea
Asian Games
Gold medal – first place	2014 Incheon	470

Kim Chang-ju (Korean: 김창주, born September 20, 1985) is a South Korean sailor. He and Kim Ji-hoon placed 19th in the men's 470 event at the 2016 Summer Olympics.
