= Allianz Regatta =

Sailing regatta in the Netherlands

- First held: 1985
- Classes: 470, 49er, 49er FX, Finn, Laser, Laser Radial, Nacra 17, RS:X
- Venue: Almere
- Website: medemblikregatta.org

Allianz Regatta, formerly known as the SPA Regatta, the Holland Regatta, the Delta Lloyd Regatta, and the Medemblik Regatta, is an annual sailing regatta in Almere, the Netherlands, first held in 1985 in Medemblik. It hosts the Olympic and Paralympic classes.

In 2005, the regatta became the Holland Regatta.

In 2015, it was part of the EUROSAF Champions Sailing Cup.

Since 2022, it has been hosted in Almere, moving from Medemblik. Together with the Trofeo Princesa Sofía, Semaine Olympique Française, and Kiel Week regattas, Allianz Regatta is part of the Sailing World Cup in the 2023 and 2024 seasons.

== Winners ==
=== Europe ===
- 1990 – Tine Moberg (CAN)
- 1991 – Dorte Jensen (DEN)
- 1992 – Linda Andersen (DEN)
- 1993 – Shirley Robertson (GBR)
- 1994 – Kristine Roug (DEN)
- 1995 – Natalia Vía Dufresne (ESP)
- 1996 – Carolijn Brouwer (BEL)
- 1997 – Shirley Robertson (GBR)
- 1998 – Carolijn Brouwer (NED)
- 1999 – Margriet Matthijsse (NED)
- 2000 – Margriet Matthijsse (NED)
- 2001 – Lenka Šmídová (CZE)
- 2002 – Sari Multala (FIN)
- 2003 – Sari Multala (FIN)
- 2004 – Siren Sundby (NOR)

=== Finn ===
- 1985 – Jørgen Lindhardsen (DEN)
- 1986 – Stig Westergaard (DEN)
- 1987 – Oleg Khopyorsky (URS)
- 1988 – Mark Neeleman (NED)
- 1989 – Oleg Khopyorsky (URS)
- 1990 – Stig Westergaard (DEN)
- 1991 – Oleg Khopyorsky (RUS)
- 1992 – Fredrik Lööf (SWE)
- 1993 – Stig Westergaard (DEN)
- 1994 – Fredrik Lööf (SWE)
- 1995 – Fredrik Lööf (SWE)
- 1996 – Will Martin (USA)
- 1997 – Xavier Rohart (FRA)
- 1998 – Sébastien Godefroid (BEL)
- 1999 – Mateusz Kusznierewicz (POL)
- 2000 – Richard Clarke (CAN)
- 2001 – Mateusz Kusznierewicz (POL)
- 2002 – Aimilios Papathanasiou (GRE)
- 2003 – Ben Ainslie (GBR)
- 2004 – Mateusz Kusznierewicz (POL)
- 2005 – Ben Ainslie (GBR)
- 2006 – Aimilios Papathanasiou (GRE)
- 2007 – Dan Slater (NZL)
- 2008 – Rafael Trujillo (ESP)
- 2009 – Ed Wright (GBR)
- 2010 – Ivan Kljaković Gašpić (CRO)
- 2011 – Ed Wright (GBR)
- 2012 – Caleb Paine (USA)
- 2013 – Mark Andrews (GBR)
- 2014 – Phillip Kasüske (GER)
- 2015 – Pieter-Jan Postma (NED)

=== ILCA 6 (formerly known as Laser Radial) ===
- 2005 – Sophie De Turckheim (FRA)
- 2006 – Evi Van Acker (BEL)
- 2008 – Anna Tunnicliffe (USA)
- 2009 – Tatiana Drozdovskaya (BLR)
- 2010 – Marit Bouwmeester (NED)
- 2011 – Marit Bouwmeester (NED)
- 2012 – Krystal Weir (AUS)
- 2013 – Annalise Murphy (IRL)
- 2014 – Marit Bouwmeester (NED)
- 2015 – Marit Bouwmeester (NED)
- 2016 – Marit Bouwmeester (NED)
- 2017 – Manami Doi (JPN)
- 2018 – Daphne van der Vaart (NED)
- 2021 – Marie Barrue (FRA)
- 2022 – Vasileia Karachaliou (GRE)

=== ILCA 7 (formerly known as Laser) ===
- 1993 – Mark Littlejohn (GBR)
- 1994 – Eivind Melleby (NOR)
- 1995 – Peter Tanscheit (BRA)
- 1996 – Robert Scheidt (BRA)
- 1997 – Robert Scheidt (BRA)
- 1998 – Robert Scheidt (BRA)
- 1999 – Ben Ainslie (GBR)
- 2000 – Karl Suneson (SWE)
- 2001 – Daniel Birgmark (SWE)
- 2002 – Robert Scheidt (BRA)
- 2003 – Robert Scheidt (BRA)
- 2004 – Vasilij Žbogar (SLO)
- 2005 – Tom Slingsby (AUS)
- 2006 – Tom Slingsby (AUS)
- 2008 – Tom Slingsby (AUS)
- 2009 – Paul Goodison (GBR)
- 2010 – Tom Slingsby (AUS)
- 2011 – Tom Slingsby (AUS)
- 2012 – Rutger van Schaardenburg (NED)
- 2013 – Rutger van Schaardenburg (NED)
- 2014 – Sam Meech (NZL)
- 2015 – Matthew Wearn (AUS)
- 2016 – Rutger van Schaardenburg (NED)
- 2017 – Elliot Hanson (GBR)
- 2018 – Elliot Hanson (GBR)
- 2021 – Lorenzo Brando Chiavarini (GBR)

=== Moth ===
- 2016 – Ben Koppelaar (NED)

=== Musto Skiff ===
- 2019 – Rick Peacock (NED)

=== RS Aero 7 ===
- 2022 – Shivam Ramdas (NED)

=== Men's 470 ===
- 1991 – Wolfgang Hunger (GER)
- 1992 – Herman Horn Johannessen (NOR)
- 1993 – Michael Koch (GER)
- 1994 – John Merricks (GBR)
- 1995 – John Merricks (GBR)
- 1996 – Benny Kouwenhoven (NED)
- 1997 – Yevhen Braslavets (UKR)
- 1998 – Tomaž Čopi (SLO)
- 1999 – Álvaro Marinho (POR)
- 2000 – Tom King (AUS)
- 2001 – Johan Molund & Martin Andersson (SWE)
- 2002 – Johan Molund & Martin Andersson (SWE)
- 2003 – Álvaro Marinho (POR)
- 2004 – Paul Foerster (USA)
- 2005 – Mathew Belcher (AUS)
- 2006 – Gabrio Zandonà (ITA)
- 2008 – Nathan Wilmot & Malcolm Page (AUS)
- 2009 – Pierre Leboucher & Vincent Garos (FRA)
- 2010 – Nic Asher & Elliot Willis (GBR)
- 2011 – Mathew Belcher & Malcolm Page (AUS)
- 2012 – Ger Owens & Scott Flanigan (IRL)
- 2013 – Mathew Belcher & Will Ryan (AUS)
- 2014 – Asenathi Jim & Roger Hudson (RSA)
- 2015 – Johan Molund & Sebastian Östling (SWE)

=== Women's 470 ===
- 1990 – Susanne Meyer (FRG)
- 1991 – Theresa Zabell (ESP)
- 1992 – J. J. Isler (USA)
- 1993 – Peggy Hardwiger (GER)
- 1994 – Ruslana Taran (UKR)
- 1995 – Yumiko Shige (JPN)
- 1996 – Theresa Zabell (ESP)
- 1997 – Ruslana Taran (UKR)
- 1998 – Ruslana Taran (UKR)
- 1999 – Ruslana Taran (UKR)
- 2000 – Ruslana Taran (UKR)
- 2001 – Sofia Bekatorou & Emilia Tsoulfa (GRE)
- 2002 – Sofia Bekatorou & Emilia Tsoulfa (GRE)
- 2003 – Marcelien de Koning (NED)
- 2004 – Lisa Westerhof (NED)
- 2005 – Ingrid Petitjean (FRA)
- 2006 – Marcelien de Koning (NED)
- 2008 – Giulia Conti & Giovanna Micol (ITA)
- 2009 – Ai Kondo & Wakako Tabata (JPN)
- 2010 – Giulia Conti & Giovanna Micol (ITA)
- 2011 – Lisa Westerhof & Lobke Berkhout (NED)
- 2013 – Jo Aleh & Polly Powrie (NZL)
- 2014 – Michelle Broekhuizen & Marieke Jongens (NED)
- 2015 – Sophie Weguelin & Eilidh McIntyre (GBR)

=== Open 470 ===
- 2016 – Simon Sivitz Kosuta & Jas Farneti (ITA)
- 2017 – Pavel Sozykin & Denis Gribanov (RUS)
- 2022 – Yves Mermod & Maja Siegenthaler (SUI)

=== 29er ===
- 2021 – Mika Quentin & Michiel Dam (NED)

=== 49er ===
- 1997 – Bob Smolders (NED)
- 1998 – Chris Nicholson (AUS)
- 1999 – Francesco Bruni (ITA)
- 2000 – Dan Slater (NZL)
- 2001 – Rodion Luka & George Leonchuk (UKR)
- 2002 – Iker Martínez de Lizarduy & Xabier Fernández (ESP)
- 2003 – Chris Draper (GBR)
- 2004 – Iker Martínez de Lizarduy (ESP)
- 2005 – Stevie Morrison (GBR)
- 2006 – Morgan Larson (USA)
- 2008 – Stevie Morrison & Ben Rhodes (GBR)
- 2009 – Nathan Outteridge & Iain Jensen (AUS)
- 2010 – Nathan Outteridge & Iain Jensen (AUS)
- 2011 – Stevie Morrison & Ben Rhodes (GBR)
- 2013 – Jonas Warrer & Peter Lang (DEN)
- 2014 – Dylan Fletcher-Scott & Alain Sign (GBR)
- 2015 – Diego Botín & Iago López (ESP)
- 2016 – Diego Botín & Iago López (ESP)
- 2017 – Tim Fischer & Fabian Graf (GER)
- 2018 – Lucas Rual & Émile Amoros (FRA)
- 2019 – Chae Bong-jin & Kim Dong-wook (KOR)
- 2021 – Bart Lambriex & Pim van Vugt (NED)
- 2022 – Bart Lambriex & Floris van de Werken (NED)

=== 49er FX ===
- 2013 – Tina Lutz & Susann Beucke (GER)
- 2015 – Annemiek Bekkering & Annette Duetz (NED)
- 2017 – Enia Ninčević & Petar Cupać (CRO)
- 2018 – Charlotte Dobson & Saskia Tidey (GBR)
- 2019 – Femke van den Berg & Elise de Ruijter (NED)
- 2021 – Annemiek Bekkering & Annette Duetz (NED)
- 2022 – Odile van Aanholt & Annette Duetz (NED)

=== 2.4 Metre ===
- 2009 – Thierry Schmitter (NED)
- 2010 – Damien Seguin (FRA)
- 2011 – Thierry Schmitter (NED)
- 2012 – Thierry Schmitter (NED)
- 2013 – Megan Pascoe (GBR)
- 2014 – Megan Pascoe (GBR)
- 2015 – Damien Seguin (FRA)
- 2016 – Heiko Kröger (GER)
- 2017 – Megan Pascoe (GBR)

=== Elliott 6m ===
- 2010 – Anne-Claire Le Berre, Myrtille Ponge & Alice Ponsar (FRA)
- 2011 – Renee Groeneveld, Annemieke Bes & Mijke Lievens (NED)

=== Hansa 303 ===
- 2019 – Finy Teitsma (FRA)

=== Hansa Liberty ===
- 2019 – Vera Voorbach (NED)

=== Skud 18 ===
- 2014 – Alexandra Rickham & Niki Birrell (GBR)
- 2015 – Daniel Fitzgibbon & Liesl Tesch (AUS)
- 2016 – Monika Gibes & Piotr Cichocki (POL)

=== Soling ===
- 1989 – Thierry Peponnet (FRA)
- 1990 – Jochen Schümann (FRG)
- 1991 – Jochen Schümann (GER)
- 1992 – Lawrie Smith (GBR)
- 1993 – Jesper Bank (DEN)
- 1994 – Jesper Bank (DEN)
- 1995 – Jesper Bank (DEN) and Magnus Holmberg (SWE) (tie)
- 1996 – Jochen Schümann (GER)
- 1997 – Jesper Bank (DEN)
- 1998 – Hans Wallén (SWE)
- 1999 – Roy Heiner (NED)

=== Sonar ===
- 2012 – Bruno Jourdren, Eric Flageul & Nicolas Vimont-Vicary (FRA)
- 2013 – Bruno Jourdren, Eric Flageul & Nicolas Vimont-Vicary (FRA)
- 2014 – Bruno Jourdren, Eric Flageul & Nicolas Vimont-Vicary (FRA)
- 2015 – Colin Harrison, Russell Boaden & Jonathan Harris (AUS)
- 2016 – Rick Doerr, Hugh Freund & Bradley Kendell (USA)

=== Star ===
- 1990 – Hubert Raudaschl (AUT)
- 1991 – Alexander Hagen (GER)
- 1992 – Mark Neeleman (NED)
- 1993 – Kees Douze (NED)
- 1994 – Anders Lundmark (SWE)
- 1995 – Michael Hestbæk (DEN)
- 1996 – Torben Grael (BRA)
- 1998 – Colin Beashel (AUS)
- 1999 – Colin Beashel (AUS)
- 2000 – Ian Walker (GBR)
- 2001 – Christian Rasmussen & Peter Ørsted (DEN)
- 2002 – Iain Percy & Steve Mitchell (GBR)
- 2003 – Iain Percy (GBR)
- 2004 – Peter Bromby (BER)
- 2005 – Fredrik Lööf (SWE)
- 2006 – Xavier Rohart (FRA)
- 2008 – Flavio Marazzi & Enrico De Maria (SUI)
- 2009 – Robert Scheidt & Bruno Prada (BRA)
- 2010 – Eivind Melleby & Petter Mørland Pedersen (NOR)
- 2011 – Robert Scheidt & Bruno Prada (BRA)

=== Yngling ===
- 2000 – Roy Heiner (NED)
- 2001 – Ulrike Schümann, Wibke Bülle & Winnie Lippert (GER)
- 2002 – Mónica Azón, Diana Cuadras & Julie Garcia (ESP)
- 2003 – Betsy Alison (USA)
- 2004 – Kristin Wagner (GER)
- 2005 – Sarah Ayton (GBR)
- 2006 – Anna Basalkina (RUS)
- 2008 – Renee Groeneveld, Marije Kampen & Brechtje van der Werf (NED)
- 2009 – Lucy MacGregor, Annie Lush & Ally Martin (GBR)

=== Nacra 17 ===
- 2013 – Moana Vaireaux & Manon Audinet (FRA)
- 2014 – Billy Besson & Marie Riou (FRA)
- 2015 – Lin Ea Cenholt & Christian Peter Lübeck (DEN)
- 2018 – Fernando Echávarri & Tara Pacheco (ESP)
- 2021 – Laila van der Meer & Bjarne Bouwer (NED)
- 2022 – Laila van der Meer & Bjarne Bouwer (NED)

=== Tornado ===
- 1990 – Dijkstra (NED)
- 1991 – Robert Nagy (FRA)
- 1992 – Lars Grael (BRA)
- 1993 – Roland Gäbler (GER)
- 1994 – Roland Gäbler (GER)
- 1995 – Fernando León Boissier (ESP)
- 1996 – Fernando León Boissier (ESP)
- 1997 – Mitch Booth (NED)
- 1998 – Pierre Pennec (FRA)
- 1999 – Roman Hagara (AUT)
- 2000 – Pierre Pennec (FRA)
- 2001 – Roman Hagara & Hans-Peter Steinacher (AUT)
- 2002 – Mitch Booth & Herbert Dercksen (NED)
- 2003 – Leigh McMillan (GBR)
- 2004 – Roman Hagara (AUT)
- 2005 – Fernando Echávarri (ESP)
- 2006 – Xavier Revil (FRA)
- 2008 – Darren Bundock & Glenn Ashby (AUS)

=== Men's Formula Kite ===
- 2014 – Oliver Bridge (GBR)
- 2022 – Benoît Gomez (FRA)

=== Women's Formula Kite ===
- 2014 – Katja Roose (NED)
- 2022 – Annelous Lammerts (NED)

=== Men's Iqfoil ===
- 2022 – Huig-Jan Tak (NED)

=== Women's Iqfoil ===
- 2022 – María Belén Bazo (PER)

=== Men's Lechner A-390 ===
- 1991 – Amit Inbar (ISR)
- 1992 – Amit Inbar (ISR)

=== Women's Lechner A-390 ===
- 1990 – Maud Herbert (FRA)
- 1991 – Joanna Burzyńska (POL)
- 1992 – Anne Herbert (FRA)

=== Men's Mistral ===
- 1993 – Murray McCaig (CAN)
- 1994 – Aaron McIntosh (NZL)
- 1995 – Nicolas Mallaret Laneyrie (FRA)
- 1996 – Aaron McIntosh (NZL)
- 1997 – Amit Inbar (ISR)
- 1998 – Mirosław Małek (POL)
- 1999 – Aaron McIntosh (NZL)
- 2000 – Ok Duck-pil (KOR)
- 2001 – Joeri van Dijk (NED)
- 2002 – Nick Dempsey (GBR)
- 2003 – JP Tobin (NZL)
- 2004 – Joeri van Dijk (NED)
- 2005 – Joeri van Dijk (NED)

=== Women's Mistral ===
- 1993 – Jorunn Horgen (NOR)
- 1994 – Dorien de Vries (NED)
- 1995 – Lee Lai-shan (HKG)
- 1996 – Maud Herbert (FRA)
- 1997 – Jorunn Horgen (NOR)
- 1998 – Marzena Okońska (POL)
- 1999 – Lee Lai-shan (HKG)
- 2000 – Miki Yoshida (JPN)
- 2001 – Lee Lai-shan (HKG)
- 2002 – Lee Lai-shan (HKG)
- 2003 – Lise Vidal (FRA)
- 2004 – Faustine Merret (FRA)
- 2005 – Chan Wai-man (HKG)

=== Men's RS:X ===
- 2006 – Nick Dempsey (GBR)
- 2008 – Julien Bontemps (FRA)
- 2009 – Dorian van Rijsselberghe (NED)
- 2010 – Przemysław Miarczyński (POL)
- 2011 – Lee Tae-hoon (KOR)
- 2012 – Shahar Tzuberi (ISR)
- 2013 – Paweł Tarnowski (POL)
- 2014 – Paweł Tarnowski (POL)
- 2015 – Paweł Tarnowski (POL)
- 2016 – Dorian van Rijsselberghe (NED)
- 2017 – Dorian van Rijsselberghe (NED)
- 2018 – Yoav Cohen (ISR)
- 2019 – Kiran Badloe (NED)
- 2021 – Piotr Myszka (POL)

=== Women's RS:X ===
- 2006 – Faustine Merret (FRA)
- 2008 – Marina Alabau (ESP)
- 2009 – Blanca Manchón (ESP)
- 2010 – Blanca Manchón (ESP)
- 2011 – Li Ling (CHN)
- 2012 – Flavia Tartaglini (ITA)
- 2013 – Flavia Tartaglini (ITA)
- 2014 – Zofia Noceti-Klepacka (POL)
- 2015 – Maja Dziarnowska (POL)
- 2016 – Zofia Noceti-Klepacka (POL)
- 2018 – Zofia Noceti-Klepacka (POL)
- 2019 – Lilian de Geus (NED)
- 2021 – Marta Maggetti (ITA)

=== Windfoil ===
- 2019 – Kiran Badloe (NED)
