= Olympic Week =

Olympic Week may refer to:

- Kiel Olympic Week, or Kiel Week, annual sailing regatta in Kiel, Germany
- French Olympic Week, or Semaine Olympique Française, annual sailing regatta in Hyères, France
- French Olympic Week in La Rochelle, or, Semaine Olympique Française La Rochelle, sailing regatta in La Rochelle, France
- Garda Trentino Olympic Week, sailing regatta in Anzio, Italy
- Italian Olympic Week, or Roma Sail Week, sailing regatta in Anzio, Italy
- Enoshima Olympic Week, annual sailing regatta in Enoshima, Japan
- Andalusian Olympic Week, annual sailing regatta in Cádiz, Spain
- Comunitat Valenciana Olympic Week, annual sailing regatta in Xàbia, Spain
