= SB20 World Championship =

World Championship in the SB20 Class

The SB20 World Championship (formally known as the Laser SB3 World Championship) is annual international sailing regatta for SB20 keelboat, they are organized by the host club on behalf of the International SB20 Class Association and recognized by World Sailing, the sports IOC recognized governing body.

== Editions ==
Event			Host			Boats	Sailor					Ref.
Ed.	Date	Year	Host club	City	Country	Boats	No.			Nat.	Cont.	Ref.
1	22-26 Sep	2008	Royal Irish Yacht Club	Dún Laoghaire	Ireland	129	406			11	5	
2	31Aug -4Sep	2009	Clube Naval de Cascais	Cascais	Portugal	54	176			7	3	
3	19-23 Jul	2010	Circolo Vela Torbole	Nago–Torbole, Lake Garda	Italy	104						
4	16–20 May	2011	Royal Torbay Yacht Club	Torquay, Devon	United Kingdom	103						
5	13-20 Dec	2012	Hamilton Island Yacht Club	Hamilton Island, QL	Australia	42						
6	7-13 Sep	2013	COYCH - Hyeres	Hyeres	France	90						
7	6-12 Sep	2014	Yacht Club Hercules	St Petersburg	Russia	47						
8	-	2015	Circolo Vela Torbole	Nago–Torbole, Lake Garda	Italy	92						
9	27Aug -3Sep	2016	Clube Naval de Cascais	Cascais	Portugal	76						
10	26-2 Aug	2017	Royal Yacht Squadron	Cowes, Isle of Wight	United Kingdom	79						
11	2-11 Jan	2018	Royal Yacht Club of Tasmania and Derwent Sailing Squadron	Hobart, Tasmania	Australia	59						
12	19-25 Sep	2019	COYCH - Hyères	Hyères, Var	France	65	221	190	31	14	3	
N/A	29Aug -3Sep	2020	Clube Naval de Cascais	Cascais	Portugal	CANCELLED DUE TO COVID						
N/A	-	2021			Singapore	CANCELLED DUE TO COVID						
13	29Aug -3Sep	2021	Clube Naval de Cascais	Cascais	Portugal	66						
14	5-9 Sep	2022	Royal Irish Yacht Club	Dún Laoghaire	Ireland	56						
15	19-23 Jun	2023	Jachtclub Scheveninge	Scheveningen	Netherlands	49						
16	11-16 Feb	2024	Dubai Offshore Sailing Club	Dubai	United Arab Emirates	48				16	3	
17	18-25 Jan	2025	ONE°15 Marina Sentosa Cove		Singapore	53	184			13	4	
18	Oct	2026	COYCH - Hyeres	Hyeres	France	65						
19		2027	Royal Torbay Yacht Club	Torquay, Devon	United Kingdom	66		178	46	13+	5+	

== Multiple World Champions ==
Compiled from the data below the table includes up to and including 2025.

Ranking	Sailor	Gold	Silver	Bronze	Total	No. Entries
1	Geoff Carveth (GBR)	4	0	0	4	5
2	Goncalo Viera Lopes (POR)	3	0	0	3	5
3	Emeric Michel (FRA)	2	2	1	5	7
4	Robin Follin (FRA)	2	1	1	4	6
5	Artem Basalkin (UKR)	2	2	0	4	9
6	Craig Burlton (GBR)	2	0	1	3	5
6	Adam Heeley (GBR)	2	0	1	3	5
6	Stephen White (AUS)	2	0	1	3	5
9	Jerry Hill (GBR)	2	0	0	2	10

== Medalists ==
Year	Gold	Silver	Bronze	Ref
2008	GBR 3053 - Team Earls Court; Geoff Carveth (GBR); Roger Gilbert (GBR); Sarah Allan (GBR); Roz Allen (GBR)	RSA 3451 - City of Cape Town; David Hudson (RSA); Roger Hudson (RSA); Alan Hudson (RSA); Wandisile Xayimpi (RSA)	GBR 3106 - I Maximus; David Lenz (GBR); Will Harrison-Cripps (GBR); Victoria Lenz (GBR); Clare Molloy (GBR)	
2009	GBR-3042 - Gill Race Team; Craig Burlton (GBR); Adam Heeley (GBR); Stephen White (AUS)	RSA-3469 - Spirit of Cape Town; Roger Hudson (RSA); Taariq Jacobs (RSA); Ashton Sampson (RSA); Marlon Jones (RSA)	RSA-3451 - City of Cape Town; David Hudson (RSA); Neil Malan (RSA); Wandisile Xayimpi (RSA); Jamie Waters (RSA)	
2010	GBR 3465 - 3 Sad Old Blokes; Jerry Hill (GBR); Joe Llewellyn (GBR); Grant Rollerson (AUS)	RSA 3451 - PROXIMO; Ian Ainslie (RSA); Roger Hudson (RSA); Adam Martin (RSA)	GBR 3065 - Rola-Trac; Ben Saxton (GBR); Tim Saxton (GBR); UNKNOWN	
2011	GBR3053 - Race Team Gill; Geoff Carveth (GBR); Andy Ramus (GBR); Emma Clarke (GBR); Ian Mills (GBR)	GBR3489 - Red; Robert Greenhalgh (GBR); Shane Hughes (IRL); Jerry Eplett (GBR); Kirsty Skinner (GBR)	GBR3042 - Gill Racing Team; Craig Burlton (GBR); Adam Heeley (GBR); Stephen White (AUS)	
2012	GBR 3053 - WKD; Geoff Carveth (GBR); Roger Hudson (RSA); Lesley Dhonau (GBR); Asenaithi Jim (RSA)	AUS 3030 - Club Marine; Glenn Bourke (AUS); Andrew York (AUS); Greg Macallansmith (AUS)	RUS 3703 - Team Russia; Rodion Luka (UKR); Oleg Zherebtsov (RUS); UNKNOWN	
2013	3042 - GILL RACE TEAM; Craig Burlton (GBR); Stephen White (AUS); Adam Heley (GBR)	3703 - KIEV RACING YACHT CLUB; Luka Rodion (UKR); Igor Matvienko (UKR); Andrew Klochko (UKR); Anna Stepanova (RUS)	3469 - RACE AHEAD; Roger Hudson (RSA); Jim Asenathi (RSA); Wandisile Xamimpi (RSA); Sibu Siaztu (RSA)	
2014	RUS 3328 (14) - ATOMSTROJKOMPLEKS; Evgeny Neugodnikov (RUS); Sergey Musikhin (RUS); Pavel Kuznetsov (RUS)	ESP 3711 (22) - New Territories; Hugo Rocha (POR); Francisco Palacio (ESP); Alexey Semenov (RUS)	FRA 3653 (50) - Charick plus - Vannes Utilikairus; Salomon Matthieu (FRA); Quentin Delapierre (FRA); Kevin Peponnet (FRA)	
2015	FRA-3653 - GIVE ME 5 BY FFV YOUTH; Robin Follin (FRA); Marine Boudot (FRA); Emeric Michel (FRA)	UKR-3726 - SKY LINE; Rodion Luka (UKR); Svetlana Sorokina (RUS); Igor Severianov (RUS)	AUS-3737; Robert Jeffreys (AUS); Glenn Bourke (AUS); Sae Lilley (AUS)	
2016	RUS-3711 - New Territories; Hugo Rocha (POR); Alex Semenov (RUS); Fran Palacios; Gonçalo Barreto	FRA-3653 - France Jeune SB20; Gabriel Skoczek (FRA); Emeric Michel (FRA); Lucas Chatonnier (FRA); Marine Boudot (FRA)	UKR3042 - TREM Engineering; Rodion Luka (UKR); Andreii Klochko (UKR); Igor Severianov (UKR); Tomás Barreto (UKR)	
2017	GBR3752 - SPORTSBOATWORLD.COM; Jerry Hill (GBR); Geoff Carveth (GBR); Richard Lovering (GBR)	AUS3731 - EXPORT ROO; Michael Cooper (GBR); David Chapman (AUS); Gerry Mitchell (AUS)	FRA3653 - GIVE ME FIVE; Robin Follin (FRA); Gauthier Germain (FRA); Malo Abguillerm (FRA); Emeric Michel (FRA)	
2018	3580 - Le Grand Réservoir / Mazet & A Achille Nebout (FRA); Gabriel Skoczek (FRA); Pauline Mazzocchi (FRA); Bruno Mourniac (FRA)	3653 - Give Me 5 - French Youth Team; Robin Follin (FRA); Gauthier Germain (FRA); Emeric Michel (FRA); Malo Abguillerm (FRA)	3728 - MARVEL; Richard Powell (GBR); Tim Burnell (GBR); Ben Vines (GBR)	
2019	GIVE ME 5 FFV YOUTH; Robin Follin (FRA); Emeric Michel (FRA); Gauthier Germain (FRA); Laurie Candela (FRA)	B - TEAM; Aleksey Lesnikov (RUS); Andrei Tukalov (RUS); Yana Basalkina (RUS); Artem Basalkin (UKR)	THE IMP; Andrew Smith (AUS); David Chapman (AUS); Lewis Noye (AUS)	
2021	BRA3751 - OpenBar; Henrique Haddad (BRA); Mario Trindade (BRA); Leonardo Lombardi (BRA); Pedro Caldas (BRA)	RYF-3805 - Comet/SpaceCobras; Elizaveta Zherebetsova (RUS); Artem Basalkin (UKR); Andreii Klochko (UKR); Andrei Tukalov (RUS)	EST-3803 - Estonia Delight; Tonu Toniste (EST); Toomas Toniste (EST); Andres Viisemann (EST)	
2022	POR-3738 - AP Hotels & Resort; José Paulo Ramada (POR); Artem Basalkin (UKR); Goncalo Lopes (POR); Carlota Gala (ESP)	GBR-3814 - Xcellent; John Pollard (GBR); Jack Wetherell (GBR); Henry Wetherell (GBR)	SGP-3750 - Glasgow Kiss; Nils Razmilovic (SWE); David Salembier (BEL); Nikolas Burfoot (NZL)	
2023	AUS 3828 - Ares; William Sargent (AUS); Edward Reid (AUS); Paige Caldecoat (AUS); Eirini Marios (AUS)	POR 3723 - Another Affair; Tiago Morais (POR); Miguel Oliveira (POR); Francisco Oliveira (POR)	GBR 3814 - Xcellent; John Pollard (GBR); Henry Wetherell (GBR); James Grummett (GBR)	
2024	UAE-3818 - Kidzink; Charlotte Borghesi (GBR); Pippa Kenton-Page (GBR); Goncalo Lopes (POR); Artem Basalkin (UKR)	UAE-3703 - Desert Eagle; Hendrik Witzmann (GER); George Leonchuk (UKR); Henrique Anjos (POR)	UAE-3299 - SuperBella; Edoardo Martinelli (ITA); Matteo De Luca (ITA); Stefano Cherin (ITA)	
2025	GBR-3834 - Xcellent; John Pollard (GBR); Henry Wetherell (GBR); David Chapman (AUS)	AUS-3819 - Porco Rosso; Paul McCartney (AUS); William Sargent (AUS); Edward Reid (AUS)	FRA-3580 - Youth Team FFV; Paul Loiseau (FRA); Aristide Delin (FRA); Maxime Helie (FRA); Camille Pfaff (FRA)	
2026	UAE-3823 - KIDZINK YOUTH; William Borghesi (GBR); Matteo Barison (ITA); Federico Zampiccoli (ITA); Goncalo Lopes (POR)	FRA-3716 - SOCARE MARBRERIE; Julien Bunel (FRA); Sylvestre De Giuli Morghen (FRA); Thomas Hautier (FRA)	FRA-3837 - LYNX; Pierre-Yves Lambert (FRA); Soren Bernillon (FRA); Baptiste Clamer (FRA); Jean-Philippe Boudard (FRA)	
