= Semaine Olympique Française La Rochelle =

Annual sailing regatta

Semaine Olympique Française
- First held: 2013
- Organizer: Société des Régates Rochelaises
- Classes: 49er, 49er FX, Finn, Laser Radial, Laser, Longtze, Nacra 17, RS:X
- Website: sof.ffvoile.fr/sof2015/

Semaine Olympique Française La Rochelle (lit. La Rochelle French Olympic Week) was an annual sailing regatta. It has been organised since 2013 in La Rochelle.

The Semaine Olympique Française in La Rochelle was born when the Semaine Olympique Française in Hyères received ISAF Sailing World Cup status. No event was held in 2014 due to the 2014 ISAF Sailing World Championships. It was part of the 2015 EUROSAF Champions Sailing Cup.

== Winners ==
=== Finn ===
- 2013 – Giles Scott (GBR)
- 2015 – Max Salminen (SWE)

=== Laser ===
- 2013 – Rutger van Schaardenburg (NED)
- 2015 – Jean-Baptiste Bernaz (FRA)

=== Laser Radial ===
- 2013 – Marie Barrue (FRA)
- 2015 – Anne-Marie Rindom (DEN)

=== Men's 470 ===
- 2013 – Pierre Leboucher & Nicolas le Berre (FRA)

=== Women's 470 ===
- 2013 – Lara Vadlau & Jolanta Ogar (AUT)

=== 49er ===
- 2013 – Emmanuel Dyen & Stéphane Christidis (FRA)
- 2015 – James Peters & Fynn Sterritt (GBR)

=== 49er FX ===
- 2013 – Sarah Steyaert & Julie Bossard (FRA)
- 2015 – Sarah Steyaert & Aude Compan (FRA)

=== Longtze ===
- 2015 – Laurent Berjon, David Boudgourd, Jean-Baptiste Morin & Samy Villeneuve (FRA)

=== Nacra 17 ===
- 2013 – Franck Cammas & Sophie de Turckheim (FRA)
- 2015 – Billy Besson & Marie Riou (FRA)

=== Men's RS:X ===
- 2013 – Piotr Myszka (POL)
- 2015 – Trevor Caraes (FRA)

=== Women's RS:X ===
- 2013 – Zofia Noceti-Klepacka (POL)
- 2015 – Farrah Hall (USA)
