= Eurolymp =

- First held: 1985
- Organizer: EUROSAF
- Classes: 2.4 mR, 470, 49er, 49er FX, Finn, Laser, Laser Radial, Nacra 17, RS:X, SKUD 18, Sonar
- Website: http://events.sailracer.org/eventsites/new.asp?eventid=197185

The Eurolymp (1985–2004), and the EUROSAF Champions Sailing Cup (2013–2016), were series of sailing regattas in Europe organised by the EUROSAF. The series featured boats which featured at the Olympics and Paralympics.

The Eurolymp circuit operated from 1985 to 2004. The Eurolymp ranking was initiated in 1988. When the ISAF Sailing World Cup limited the events to one per continent, plans were made to restart the series. After a nine-year hiatus, the circuit was restarted as the EUROSAF Champions Sailing Cup in 2013.

== Seasons ==
Season	Regattas	Ref.
Eurolymp
1985		
1986		
1987		
1988		
1989		
1990		
1991		
1992		
1993		
1994		
1995	Roma Sail Week, Semaine Olympique Française, Danish Olympic Spring Regatta, SPA Regatta, Eurolymp UK, Kiel Week	
1996	Palamós Christmas Race	
1997		
1998		
1999		
2000		
2001	Palamós Christmas Race, Athens Eurolymp, Roma Sail Week, Semaine Olympique Française, SPA Regatta, Danish Olympic Spring Regatta, Kiel Week, Austrian Interunfall Lakes Week	
2002	Palamós Christmas Race, Athens Eurolymp, Olympic Garda, Semaine Olympique Française, SPA Regatta, Danish Olympic Spring Regatta, Kiel Week, Austrian Interunfall Lakes Week	
2003	Palamós Christmas Race, Athens Eurolymp, Olympic Garda, Semaine Olympique Française, SPA Regatta, Danish Olympic Spring Regatta, Kiel Week, Austrian Interunfall Lakes Week	
2004	Palamós Christmas Race, Athens Eurolymp, Olympic Garda, Semaine Olympique Française, SPA Regatta, Danish Olympic Spring Regatta, Kiel Week, Austrian Interunfall Lakes Week	
EUROSAF Champions Sailing Cup
2013	Garda Trentino Olympic Week, Delta Lloyd Regatta, Sail for Gold, Kiel Week, Semaine Olympique Française La Rochelle	
2014	Garda Trentino Olympic Week, Delta Lloyd Regatta, Sail for Gold, Kiel Week	
2015	Trofeo Princesa Sofía, Garda Trentino Olympic Week, Delta Lloyd Regatta, Kiel Week, Semaine Olympique Française La Rochelle	
2016	Trofeo Princesa Sofía, Garda Trentino Olympic Week, Delta Lloyd Regatta, Kiel Week	

== Winners ==
=== Men's 470 ===
Year	Helmsman	Country
2013	Sime Fantela	Croatia
2014	Asenathi Jim	South Africa
2015		

=== Men's 49er ===
Year	Helmsman	Country
2013	Julien d'Ortoli	France
2014	Federico Alonso	Spain
2015		

=== Men's Finn ===
Year	Helmsman	Country
2013	Piotr Kula	Poland
2014	Phillip Kasüske	Germany
2015		

=== Men's Laser ===
Year	Helmsman	Country
2013	Nicholas Heiner	Netherlands
2014	Sam Meech	New Zealand
2015		

=== Men's RS:X ===
Year	Helmsman	Country
2013	Elliott Carney	Great Britain
2014	Luka Mratovic	Croatia
2015		

=== Women's 470 ===
Year	Helmsman	Country
2013	Jo Aleh	New Zealand
2014	Anna Burnet	Great Britain
2015		

=== Women's 49erFX ===
Year	Helmsman	Country
2013	Tina Lutz	Germany
2014	Annemiek Bekkering	Netherlands
2015		

=== Women's Laser Radial ===
Year	Helmsman	Country
2013	Annalise Murphy	Ireland
2014	Tatiana Drozdovskaya	Belarus
2015		

=== Women's RS:X ===
Year	Helmsman	Country
2013	Izzy Hamilton	Great Britain
2014	Yuki Sunaga	Japan
2015		

=== Mixed Nacra 17 ===
Year	Helmsman	Country
2013	Jason Waterhouse	Australia
2014	Vittorio Bissaro	Italy
2015		

=== Open 2.4mR ===
Year	Helmsman	Country
2013	Barend Kol	Netherlands
2014	Barend Kol	Netherlands
2015		

=== Open SKUD ===
Year	Helmsman	Country
2014	Alexandra Rickham	Great Britain

=== Open Sonar ===
Year	Helmsman	Country
2013	John Robertson	Great Britain
2014	John Robertson	Great Britain
2015		

== See also ==
- ISAF Sailing World Cup
