= Melges 24 World Championship =

International sailing regatta

The Melges 24 World Championship is an annual international sailing regatta for Melges 24 keelboats, organized by the host club on behalf of the International Melges 24 Class Association and recognized by World Sailing, the sports IOC recognized governing body.

== Events ==
Host clubs of the Melges 24 World Championship
Host clubs of the Melges 24 World Championship

Editions			Host			Boats	Sailors					Ref.
No.	Date	Year	Host club	Location	Nat.	Boats	Tot	M	F	Nat.	Cont.	Ref.
1	-	1998	Royal Torbay Yacht Club	Torquay, Devon	United Kingdom	96						
2	1-10 Oct	1999	Alamitos Bay Yacht Club	Long Beach, California	United States	49				6+	2+	
3	26Aug -2Sep	2000	Societe des Regates Rochelaises	La Rochelle, Charente-Maritime	France	125				6+	2+	
N/A		2001	Lauderdale Yacht Club	Fort Lauderdale	United States	Event cancelled						
4		2001/02	Key West Race Week	Key West	United States	77				7+	3+	
5		2002	Lübecker Yacht-Club	Travemünde	Germany	74				15+	2+	
6	9-17 Oct	2003	St. Francis Yacht Club	Berkeley, San Francisco, California	United States	58				10+	3+	
7	9-13 Aug	2004	Marstrands Segelsallskap	Marstrands	Sweden	80				13+	2+	
8	9-16 Dec	2005	Ocean Reef Yacht Club	Key Largo	United States	98				12+	3+	
9	8 -1Sep	2006	Yacht Club de Hyeres	Hyères, Var	France	119				16+	3+	
10	5-12 May	2007	Santa Cruz Yacht Club	Santa Cruz, California	United States	58				10+	3+	
11	28May -5Jun	2008	Yacht Club Costa Smeralda	Porto Cervo, Sardinia	Italy	114				21+	3+	
12	23-31 Oct	2009	Eastport Yacht Club	Annapolis, Maryland	United States	51				12+	2+	
13	4-12 Aug	2010	Kalev Yacht Club	Tallinn	Estonia	79				21+	5+	
14	15-22 May	2011	Corpus Christi Yacht Club	Corpus Christi, Texas	United States	32				12+	4+	
15	28Jul -4Aug	2012	Circolo Vela Torbole	Nago–Torbole, Lake Garda	Italy	125				23+	4+	
16	29Sep -6Oct	2013	San Francisco Yacht Club	Belvedere, California	United States	58				16+	5+	
17	27Jan -2Feb	2014	Royal Geelong Yacht Club	Geelong	Australia	26				11+	4+	
18	30Jun -5Jul	2015	Middelfart Sailing Club	Middelfart	Denmark	95				17+	2+	
19	26Nov -3Dec	2016	Coconut Grove Sailing Club	Miami	United States	72				20+	4+	
20	28Jul -4Aug	2017	Helsingfor Segelklubb	Helsingør	Denmark	59				17+	3+	
21	31May -9Jun	2018	Royal Victoria Yacht Club, Canada	Victoria, BC	Canada	41				7+	3+	
22	5-12 Oct	2019	Lega Navale Italiana – Sez. Villasimius	Villasimius, Sardinia	Italy	61				19+	5+	
N/A		2020	Charleston Sailing Club	Charleston	United States	Delayed due to COVID						
N/A		2021	Charleston Sailing Club	Charleston	United States	Cancelled due to COVID						
23	7-15 May	2022	Lauderdale Yacht Club	Fort Lauderdale, Florida	United States	31	150	131	19	13	4	
24	24Jun -1Jul	2023	Middelfart Sailing Club	Middelfart	Denmark	47				22+	4+	
25	20-24 Aug	2024	San Francisco Yacht Club	Belvedere, California	United States	31	153	134	19	19	5	
26	20-27 Sept	2025	Yacht Club Adriaco	Trieste	Italy	67	337	288	49	25	5	
27	19-26 Sept	2026	Little Traverse Yacht Club	Harbor Springs, Michigan	United States	49	239	203	36	15	4	

== Multiple Medalist ==
Updated to include 2026 based on the information on this page the entries column may be an underestimation as full crew lists were not published in every year

Ranking	Sailor	Gold	Silver	Bronze	Total	No. Entries	Ref.
1	Federico Michetti (ITA)	5	2	1	8	12	
2	Enrico Fonda (ITA)	3	1	0	4	9	
2	Carlo Fracassoli (ITA)	3	1	0	4	8	
4	Jonathan Mckee (USA)	3	0	2	5	7	
5	Lorenzo Bressani (ITA)	3	0	0	3	4	
5	Lorenzo Santini (ITA)	3	0	0	3	4	
7	Andy Burdick (USA)	2	3	1	6	12	
8	Giovanni Ferrari (ITA)	2	2	0	4	7	
9	Flavio Favini (ITA)	2	1	1	4	11	
10	Gian Luca Perego (ITA)	2	1	0	3	6	
10	Stefano Lagi (ITA)	2	1	0	3	7	
12	Vince Brun (USA)	2	0	1	3	5	
13	Matteo Ramian (ITA)	2	0	0	2	5	
13	Richard Clarke (CAN)	2	0	0	2	10	
13	Bill Hardesty (USA)	2	0	0	2	6	
13	Fabio Gridelli (ITA)	2	0	0	2	4	
13	Stuart Mcnay (USA)	2	0	0	2	2	

== World Championships ==
Games	Gold	Silver	Bronze
1998; Torbay GBR ?? Boats	USA 162 - North Sails OD Vince Brun (ITA); Simon Russell (GBR); Simon Fry (GBR); Ian Walker (GBR)	Unknown	Unknown
1999; Alamitos USA; 49 Boats	USA 415 - Rush Vince Brun (ITA); Ben Mitchell (USA); Bill Hardesty (USA); Dave Kirk (USA)	ITA 139 Giorgio Zuccoli (ITA); UNKNOWN; UNKNOWN; UNKNOWN	USA 330 Collina; Wootten; Jeff Madrigali (USA); UNKNOWN
2000; La RochelleFRA; 125 Boats	ITA 139 – ALE ALI Giorgio Zuccoli (ITA); Federico Michetti (ITA); Franco Niggeler (ITA); Alessandro Bona (ITA); Corsin Camenisch (SUI)	USA 409 – FULL THROTTLE Brian Porter (USA); UNKNOWN; UNKNOWN; UNKNOWN	FRA 383 – PLAN GESTION; CHABANNE; UNKNOWN; UNKNOWN; UNKNOWN
2001; Key West USA; 77 Boats	SUI 483 (59) – Blu Moon Flavio Favini (ITA); Franco Rossini (SUI); Tiziano Nava (ITA); Alberto Pristinoni (ITA); Serena Cima (ITA)	USA 525 (77) – Star Harry Melges III (USA); Jeff Ecklund (USA); UNKNOWN; UNKNOWN	USA 458 (57) – Flipper Vince Brun (USA); Rick Merriman; Jeff Pape; Brian Terhaar
2002; Travemünde GER; 74 Boats	USA 409 – Star Harry Melges III (USA); Andy Burdick (USA); Tony Kolb (GER); Jeff Ecklund (USA)	FRA 475 – P & P Racing Team Sebastian Col (FRA); Philippe Ligot (FRA); Thomas Allin (FRA); Tanguy Cariou (FRA); William Thomas (FRA)	GBR 437 – Black Seal Jamie Lea (GBR); Richard Thompson (GBR); Nigel Young (GBR); T Schwerdt (GER); Rob Larke (GBR)
2003; San Francisco USA; 58 Boats	PEGASUS 24-1 Samuel Kahn (USA); Richard Clarke (CAN); Mark Christensen (NZL); Brian Hutchinson (USA); Brian Lee (USA)	Star; Harry Melges III (USA); Jeff Ecklund (USA); UNKNOWN; UNKNOWN; UNKNOWN	FULL THROTTLE; Brian Porter (USA); UNKNOWN; UNKNOWN; UNKNOWN
2004; Marstrand SWE; 80 Boats	FRA 571 – Partner & Partners; Sebastian Col (FRA); Phillipe Ligot; Christian Ponthieu; Thomas Allin; William Thomas	ITA 409 – Alina; Maurizio Abbà (ITA); UNKNOWN; UNKNOWN; UNKNOWN	SUI 521 – Blu Moon; Flavio Favini (ITA); UNKNOWN; UNKNOWN; UNKNOWN
2005; Key Largo USA; 98 Boats	USA 515 – Luna Rossa James Spithill (AUS); Jonathan McKee (USA); Charles McKee (USA); Manuel Modena (ITA); Max Agnese (USA)	ITA 636 (26) – MARRACHECH EXPRESS Gabriele Benussi (ITA); Giuliano CHIANDUSSI (ITA); Andrea Bussani (ITA); Riccardo Gratton (ITA)	USA505 (73) – Pegasus 505 Dave Ullman (USA); UNKNOWN; UNKNOWN; UNKNOWN
2006; Hyères FRA; 119 Boats	ITA 643 – BETTE Nicola Celon (ITA); Ezio Amadori (ITA); Manuel Giubellini (ITA); Raimondo Tonelli (ITA); Alberto Bolzan (ITA)	FRA 571 – DRP-PARTNER-PARTNERS Francois Brenac (FRA); Philippe Ligot (FRA); Thomas Allin (FRA); Christian Ponthieu (FRA); William Thomas (FRA)	SUI 521 – BLU MOON Chris Rast (SUI); Franco Rossini (SUI); Andy Escourt (NZL); Tiziano Nava (ITA); Serena Cima (ITA)
2007; Santa Cruz USA; 58 Boats	USA 505 – Pegasus 505 David Ullman (USA); Bill Hardesty (USA); Brent Ruhne (USA); Andy Estcourt (NZL); Shana Phelan (USA)	USA 649 – Full Throttle Brian Porter (USA); Harry Melges III (USA); Andy Burdick (USA); John Porter (USA)	FRA 571 – EFG/GroupPartouche Brenac Francois (FRA); Christian Ponthieu (FRA); Benjamin Cohen (FRA); William Thomas (FRA); Thomas Allin (FRA)
2008; Porto Cervo ITA; 114 Boats	UKA UKA RACING – ITA 715 Lorenzo Bressani (ITA); Lorenzo Santini (ITA); Federico Michetti (ITA); Francesca Prina (ITA); Francesco Bruni (ITA)	ITA 727 – PILOT ITALIA Alberto Bolzan (ITA); Pietro D'Alì (ITA); Stefano Ciampalini (ITA); Pietro Catalogna (ITA); Simone Spangaro (ITA)	ALINA HELLY HANSEN – ITA 722 Luca Valerio (ITA); Maurizio Abba (ITA); Daniele Cassinari (ITA); Nicholas Dal Ferro (ITA); Roberta De Paoli (ITA)
2009; Annapolis USA; 51 Boats	USA 655 – West Marine / New England Chris Larson (USA); Richard Clarke (CAN); Mike Wolfs (CAN); Curtis Florence (CAN)	ITA 777 – Joefly 37 Gabrio Zandona (ITA); Daniele Cassinari (ITA); Giovanni Maspero (ITA); Andrea Felci (ITA); Nicholas Dal Ferro (ITA)	NOR 804 – Full Medal Jacket Eivind Melleby (NOR); Espen Stokkeland (NOR); Petrus Eidi (NOR); Lars Horn Johannessen (NOR)
2010; Tallinn EST; 79 Boats	Lorenzo Bressani (ITA) Federico Michetti (ITA); Fabio Gridelli (ITA); Jonathan McKee (USA); Lorenzo Santini (ITA)	NOR 400 – Baghdad Kristian Nergaard (NOR); Harry Melges III (USA); Sigurd Hekk Paulsen (NOR); Johan Mats Rikard Barne (SWE)	ITA 727 – Hurricane – Murphy & NYE Alberto Bolzan (ITA); Paolo Testolin (ITA); Daniele Cassinari (ITA); Stefano Ciampalini (ITA); Simone Spangaro (ITA)
2011; Torquay GBR; 32 Boats	ITA 817 – UkaUka Racing Lorenzo Bressani (ITA); Jonathan McKee (USA); Federico Michetti (ITA); Fabio Gridellie (ITA); Lorenzo Santini (ITA)	USA 749 – FULL THROTTLE Brian Porter (USA); Matt Woodworth (USA); Sam Rogers (USA); Andy Burdick (USA)	IRL 607 – Embarr Conor CLARKE (IRL); Nathan Wilmot (AUS); Maurice O'Connell (IRL); David Hughes (USA); Maeve Judge (IRL)
2012; ITA – Scarlino; 125 Boats	ITA 803 – Gullisara Carlo Fracassoli (ITA); Andrea Felci (ITA); Carlo Zermini (ITA); Enrico Fonda (ITA); Giovanni Ferrari (ITA)	ITA 716 – Saetta (20) Alberto Bolzan (ITA); Nathan Wilmot (AUS); Michele Giovannini (ITA); Stefano Ciampalini (ITA); Simone Spangaro (ITA)	ITA 819 – AUDI (32) Riccardo Simoneschi (ITA); Gabriele Benussi (ITA); Vittorio Rosso (ITA); Federico Buscaglia (ITA); Lucia Giorgetti (ITA)
2013; USA – San Francisco; 58 Boats	USA 749 – "FULL THROTTLE" Brian Porter (USA); Andy Burdick (USA); Federico Michetti (ITA); Matt Woodworth (USA)	SUI 825 – "BLU MOON" Flavio Favini (SUI); Gabriele Benussi (SUI); Stefano Rizzi (SUI); Giovanni Ferrari (SUI); Nicholas Dal Ferro (SUI)	DEN 782 – SOFFE Kim Christensen (DEN); Jamie Lea (GBR); Peter Jakobsen (DEN); Jesper Jespersen (DEN)
2014; Geelong AUS; 25Boats	SUI 825 – BLU MOON (21) Flavio Favini (ITA); Gabriele Benussi (ITA); Giovanni Ferrari (ITA); Stefano Rizzi (ITA); Nicholas Dal Ferro (ITA)	USA 841 – STAR (17) Harry Melges III (USA); Andy Burdick (USA); Jeff Ecklund (USA); Federico Michetti (ITA)	USA 820 – WEST MARINE RIGGING Bora Gulari (USA); Jonathan McKee (USA); George Peet (USA); Jonny Goldsberry (USA); Norman Berge (USA)
2015; Middlefart DEN; 95 Boats	SUI 684 – EFG Christopher Rast (SUI); Patrick Zaugg (SUI); Udo Moser (SUI); Pavel Johannes Tolonen (SUI); Reneé Schenk (SUI)	ITA 735 - Altea Andrea Racchelli (ITA); Gaudenzio Bonini; Alberto Verna; Michele Gregoratto; Anne-Soizik Bertin	USA 820 – Air Force One Bora Gulari (USA) Jonathan McKee (USA); George Peet (USA); Federico Michetti (ITA); Solvig Sayre (USA)
2016; Miami USA; 74 Boats	IRL 829 – Embarr Conor Clarke (IRL); Aoife English (IRL); David Hughes (USA); Stuart McNay (USA); Maurice O'Connell (IRL)	ITA 822 – Maidollis 3 Gian Luca Perego (ITA); Giovanni Ferrari (ITA); Enrico Fonda (ITA); Carlo Fracassoli (ITA); Stefano Lagi (ITA)	USA 849 – Full Throttle Brian Porter (USA); Andy Burdick (USA); Sam Rogers (USA); Matt Woodworth (USA)
2017; Helsinki FIN; 59 Boats	ITA 854 – MAIDOLLIS Carlo Fracassoli (ITA); Enrico Fonda (ITA); Giovanni Ferrari (ITA); Luca Perego (ITA); Stefano Lagi (ITA)	USA 851 – Monsoon Bruce Ayres (USA); Mike Buckley (USA); George Peet (USA); Jeff Reynolds (USA); Jessica Koenig	USA 838 – Mikey Kevin Welch (USA); Ross MacDonald (CAN); Jason Rhodes (CAN); Ian Sloan; Serena Village (USA)
2018; CAN; 41 Boats	ITA 722#678 – Altea Andrea Racchelli (ITA); Filippo Togni (ITA); Gaudenzio Bonini (ITA); Matteo Ramian (ITA); Michele Gregoratto (ITA)	USA 829 – WTF Alan Field (USA); Erik Shampain; Willem Van Waay; Steve Hunt; Lucas Calabrese (ARG)	USA 851 – Monsoon Bruce Ayres (USA); Chelsea Simms (USA); George Peet (USA); Jeff Reynolds (USA); Mike Buckley (USA)
2019; Sardinia ITA; 61 Boats	Maidollis ITA 854 Carlo Fracassoli (ITA); Enrico Fonda (ITA); Stefano Lagi (ITA); Gian Luca Perego (ITA); Matteo Ramian (ITA)	Monsoon USA 851 Bruce Ayres (USA); Mike Buckley (USA)y; Federico Michetti (ITA); George Peet (USA); Chelsea Simms (USA)	Bombarda ITA 860 Andrea Pozzi (ITA); Stefano Ciampalini (ITA); Nicholas Dal Ferro (ITA); Matteo Ivaldi (ITA); Carlo Zermini (ITA)
2020; Charlestone (USA)	Postponed to 2023 Due to COVID		
2021; Charlestone (USA)	Cancelled Due to COVID		
2022; Fort Lauderdale (USA)	USA 829 – RAZA MIXTA Peter Duncan (USA); Erik Shampain (USA); Morgan Trubovich (NZL); Victor Diaz De Leon (USA); Matt Pistay (USA)	USA 866 – ZENDA EXPRESS Harry Melges IV (USA); Finn Rowe (USA); Ripley Shelley (USA); Carlos Robles (ESP); Patrick Wilson (CAN)	USA 851 – MONSOON Bruce Ayres (USA); Jeremy Wilmot (AUS); Chelsea Simms (USA); Edward Hackey (AUS); Tomas Dietrich (ARG)
2023	USA 865 - PACIFIC YANKEE Drew Freides (USA); Nic Asher (GBR); Charlie Smythe (USA); Alec Anderson (IVB); Mark Ivey (USA)	USA 829 - RAZA MIXTA Peter Duncan (USA); Morgan Trubovich (NZL); Erik Shampain (USA); Patrick Wilson (USA); Victor Diaz De Leon (USA)	CRO 649 - MATARAN 24 Ante Botica (CRO); Ivo Matić (CRO); Mario Škrlj (CRO); Damir Civadelić (CRO); Bruna Princivali (CRO)
2024	USA 868 - CONVEXITY Donald Wilson (USA); Jeremy Wilmot (AUS); Edward Hackney (AUS); Tomas Dietrich (ARG); Ian Liberty (USA)	USA 820 - KINGSPOKE; Bora Gulari (USA) Norman Berge (USA); Nicholas Ford (USA); Carlos Robles (ESP); Charles Smythe (USA)	USA 856 - SENTINEL; Geoffrey Fargo (USA) Jackson Benvenutti (USA); Grant Janov (USA); Alec Anderson (IVB)
2025	NEFELI - GER 673; Peter David Karrié (GER) Alessandro Franci (ITA); Niccolo Bianchi (ITA); Saverio Cigliano (ITA); Karlo Hmeljak (SLO)	DARK ENERGY - USA 868 Laura Grondin (USA); Edward Hackney (AUS); Nicholas Ford (USA); Richard Peale (USA); Taylor Canfield (IVB)	STRAMBAPAPà - ITA 689; Michele Paoletti (ITA) Giovanna Micol (ITA); Davide Bivi (ITA); Giulia Pignolo (ITA); Pietro Perelli (ITA)
2026	WAH GWAN - USA 865 Anthony Kotoun (ISV); Grant Janov (USA); Jordan Janov (USA); Francis Schulte (USA); Stu McNay (USA)	SHIITAKE - USA 864 Peter Duncan (USA); Greiner Hobbs (USA); Will Ryan (AUS); Victor Diaz De Leon (USA); Reed Baldridge (USA)	GAMECOCK - USA 871 Peter McClennen (USA); Severin Gramm (USA); Wilson Stout (USA); Mike Marshall (USA); Jeremy Wilmot (USA)
