= Garda Trentino Olympic Week =

- Organizer: Fraglia Vela Riva
- Classes: 2.4 Metre, 470, 49er, 49er FX, Finn, Laser, Laser Radial, Nacra 17, RS:X, Sonar, Skud 18
- Venue: Riva del Garda
- Website: www.fragliavelariva.it/en/regatta/1829/view

Garda Trentino Olympic Week is an annual sailing regatta in Riva del Garda, Italy. It hosts the Olympic and Paralympic classes.

It is part of the 2015 EUROSAF Champions Sailing Cup.

== Winners ==
=== Finn ===
- 2013 – Ed Wright (GBR)

=== Laser ===
- 2013 – Andy Maloney (NZL)
- 2014 – Robert Scheidt (BRA)
- 2015 – Jean-Baptiste Bernaz (FRA)
- 2016 – Sergey Komissarov (RUS)

=== Laser Radial ===
- 2013 – Annalise Murphy (IRL)
- 2014 – Annalise Murphy (IRL)
- 2015 – Evi Van Acker (BEL)
- 2016 – Vasileia Karachaliou (GRE)

=== Men’s 470 ===
- 2013 – Šime Fantela & Igor Marenić (CRO)
- 2014 – Šime Fantela & Igor Marenić (CRO)
- 2015 – Simon Sivitz Kosuta & Jas Farneti (ITA)

=== Women’s 470 ===
- 2013 – Jo Aleh & Polly Powrie (NZL)
- 2014 – Roberta Caputo & Alice Sinno (ITA)
- 2015 – Tina Mrak & Veronika Macarol (SLO)

=== 49er ===
- 2013 – Marcus Hansen & Josh Porebski (NZL)
- 2014 – Julien d'Ortoli & Noé Delpech (FRA)
- 2015 – Ruggero Tita & Giacomo Cavalli (ITA)

=== 49er FX ===
- 2014 – Martine Grael & Kahena Kunze (BRA)
- 2015 – Giulia Conti & Francesca Clapcich (ITA)

=== 2.4 Metre ===
- 2015 – Antonio Squizzato (ITA)
- 2016 – Matthew Bugg (AUS)

=== Skud 18 ===
- 2015 – Alexandra Rickham & Niki Birrell (GBR)
- 2016 – Alexandra Rickham & Niki Birrell (GBR)

=== Sonar ===
- 2015 – Cristiano D'Agaro, Gianbacchisio Pira & Fabrizio Solazzo (ITA)
- 2016 – John Robertson, Hannah Stodel & Stephen Thomas (GBR)

=== Nacra 17 ===
- 2013 – Thomas Zajac & Tanja Frank (AUT)
- 2014 – Vittorio Bissaro & Silvia Sicouri (ITA)
- 2015 – Vittorio Bissaro & Silvia Sicouri (ITA)

=== Men’s RS:X ===
- 2013 – Dorian van Rijsselberghe (NED)
- 2014 – Luka Mratović (CRO)
- 2015 – Daniele Benedetti (ITA)

=== Women’s RS:X ===
- 2013 – Flavia Tartaglini (ITA)
- 2014 – Flavia Tartaglini (ITA)
- 2015 – Bérénice Mege (FRA)
