= Tasar World Championship =

World Championship in the Tasar Dinghy

The Tasar World Championship is an bi-annual international sailing regatta for Tasar (dinghy) class, they are organized by the host club on behalf of the International Tasar Class Association and recognized by World Sailing, the sports IOC recognized governing body. The class gained World Sailing recognition at the end of 2001.

== Events ==
Host cities of the Tasar World Championship

| Ed. | | | Hosts | | | Sailor | | | Boats | | | | Ref. |
| No | Day/Month | Year | Host club | City | Country | No. | Nat. | Cont. | Boats | | | Mix | Ref. |
|---|---|---|---|---|---|---|---|---|---|---|---|---|---|
| 1 | 20–27 Jun | 2003 | Canadian Forces Sailing Association | Esquimalt, BC | Canada | 126 | 6 | 4 | 62 | | | | |
| 2 | 1-8 Jul | 2005 | Darwin Sailing Club | Darwin | Australia | 261 | 6 | 4 | 130 | 49 | 8 | 73 | |
| 3 | 2–11 Jul | 2007 | Australian Tasar Council / Cape Panwa Hotel | Phuket | Thailand | 116 | 8 | 5 | 58 | 21 | 1 | 36 | |
| 4 | 18–27 Sep. | 2009 | Wakayama Sailing Center | Wakayama | Japan | 175 | 6 | 4 | 78 | | | | |
| 5 | 16–23 Sep. | 2011 | Royal Torbay Yacht Club | Torbay | United Kingdom | 106 | 6 | 4 | 53 | 15 | 1 | 37 | |
| 6 | 10–17 Aug | 2013 | Columbia Gorge Racing Association | Cascade Locks, Oregon | United States | 118 | 6 | 4 | 59 | 21 | 0 | 38 | |
| 7 | 2–9 Jan | 2015 | Geographe Bay Yacht Club | Busselton | Australia | 244 | 7 | 4 | 122 | 34 | 7 | 81 | |
| 8 | 30Jul –6Aug | 2017 | | Gamagori | Japan | 210 | 5 | 4 | 97 | 44 | 2 | 51 | |
| 9 | 29Jul -3Aug | 2019 | Hayling Island Sailing Club | Hayling Island | United Kingdom | 134 | 7 | 4 | 67 | 25 | 2 | 40 | |
| N/A | 10–18 Sep. | 2021 | Seattle Yacht Club / Corinthian Yacht Club of Seattle | Seattle, Washington | United States | Delay to 2022 due to COVID | | | | | | | |
| 10 | 17–25 Sep | 2022 | Seattle Yacht Club / Corinthian Yacht Club of Seattle | Seattle, Washington | United States | 60 | 5 | 4 | 30 | 8 | 0 | 22 | |
| 11 | 2–9 Jan | 2024 | Sandringham Yacht Club | Melbourne | Australia | 204 | 7 | 4 | 102 | 37 | 2 | 63 | |
| 12 | 17-21 July | 2025 | Circolo Vela Arco | Lake Garda | Italy | 72 | 8 | 3 | 36 | 10 | 1 | 25 | |
| 13 | 5–12 Jun | 2026 | Okuma Private Beach & Resort | Kunigami | Japan | 246 | 6 | 4 | 113 | | | | |
| 14 | 26Jun -7Jul | 2028 | Royal Torbay Yacht Club | Torquay, Devon | United Kingdom | | | | | | | | |

== Multiple World Champions ==
Compiled from the data below the table includes up to and including 2026.

| Ranking | Sailor | Gold | Silver | Bronze | Total | No. Entries* | Ref. |
| 1 | Jonathan McKee (USA) | 4 | 3 | 0 | 7 | 8 | |
| 1 | Libby McKee (USA) | 4 | 3 | 0 | 7 | 8 | |
| 3 | Robert Douglass (AUS) | 3 | 3 | 1 | 7 | 10 | |
| 3 | Nicole Douglass (AUS) | 3 | 3 | 1 | 7 | 10 | |
| 5 | Dalton Bergan (USA) | 2 | 0 | 1 | 3 | 4 | |
| 5 | Lindsay Buchan (USA) | 2 | 0 | 1 | 3 | 4 | |

== Medalists ==
| Year / Location | Gold | Silver | Bronze | Ref. |
|---|---|---|---|---|
| 2003 | Jonathan McKee (USA); Libby Johnson-McKee (USA) | Carol Buchan (USA); Carl Buchan (USA) | Jay Renehan (USA); Lisa Renehan (USA) | |
| 2005 | Robert Douglass; Nicole Douglass (AUS) | Craig McPhee; Kevin Kellow (AUS) | Ikuya Tanaka; Noriko Tanaka (JPN) | |
| 2007 | Jonathan McKee (USA); Libby Johnson-McKee (USA) | Rob Douglass (AUS); Nicole Douglass (AUS) | Brett Young (AUS); Kevin Kellow (AUS) | |
| 2009 | Rob Douglass (AUS); Nicole Douglass (AUS) | Craig McPhee (AUS); Phillippa Arevalo (AUS) | Hiroaki Sato (JPN); Yasuaki Muragishi (JPN) | |
| 2011 | Paul Ridgway (AUS); Bronwyn Ridgway (AUS) | Rob Douglass (AUS); Nicole Douglass (AUS) | Malcolm Davies (GBR); Fiona Davies (GBR) | |
| 2013 | Anthony Boscolo (USA); Haley Lane (USA) | Michael Karas (USA); Molly Jackson (USA) | Dalton Bergan (USA); Lindsay Bergan (USA) | |
| 2015 | 2858 – Doppio; Chris Dance (AUS); Peter Hackett (AUS) | 2848 – Coollit; Rob Douglass (AUS); Nicole Douglass (AUS) | 2916 – Fast & Thorough & Sharp as a Tack; Jay Renehan (USA); Lisa Renehan (USA) | |
| 2017 | USA 2597 (37) - Dr. Beverly; Jonathan McKee (USA); Libby Johnson-McKee (USA) | AUS 2858 (60) – Doppio; Chris Dance (AUS); Jeremy Elmslie (AUS) | AUS 2848 (11) – Coollit II; Robert Douglass (AUS); Nicole Douglass (AUS) | |
| 2019 | AUS 2848; Robert Douglass (AUS); Nicole Douglass (AUS) | AUS 2942; James Burman (AUS); Tara Burman (AUS) | GBR 2877; James Peters (GBR); Charlie Darling (GBR) | |
| 2022 | USA 2690; Dalton Bergan (USA); Lindsay Bergan (USA) | USA 2981; Jonathan McKee (USA); Libby Johnson McKee (USA) | USA 2982; Jay Renehan (USA); Lisa Renehan (USA) | |
| 2024 | USA 2981 - DR BEVERLY; Jonathan McKee (USA); Libby Johnson McKee (USA) | AUS 2976 - SKIPPY; Harrison Sly (AUS); Zara Challis (AUS) | AUS 2980 - MAGIC; Chris Dance (AUS); Peter Hackett (AUS) | |
| 2025 | GBR-3002; Nick Craig (GBR); Toby Lewis (GBR) | USA 2981 - DR BEVERLY; Jonathan McKee (USA); Libby Johnson McKee (USA) | AUS-2925; Hugh Tait (AUS); Anna Tait (AUS) | |
| 2026 | USA 2690; Dalton Bergan (USA); Lindsay Bergan (USA) | USA 2981; Jonathan McKee (USA); Libby Johnson McKee (USA) | JPN-2741; Kazuishi Ito (JPN); Yasuaki Muragishi (JPN) | |

== International Regatta ==
Prior to gaining World Sailing status the class held the following International regattas.

| Year | Gold | Silver | Bronze |
|---|---|---|---|
| 1981 Canberra | AUS; David Jones; Malcolm Jones | | |
| 1983 Vancouver | USA; Charlie McKee; Leslie Miller | | |
| 1985 Sydney | USA; Charlie McKee; Becky Brown | | |
| 1986 London | AUS; Rick Longbottom; Louise Scullion | | |
| 1988 Yeppoon | AUS; Adrian Finglas; Adam Beashel | | |
| 1989 Vancouver | USA; Charlie McKee; Becky Brown | | |
| 1991 Adelaide | USA; Charlie McKee; Becky Brown | | |
| 1992 Hayama | USA; Jay Renehan; Lisa Renehan | | |
| 1994 Torbay | AUS; Russell Ford; Cheryl Hutchins | | |
| 1996 Cascade Locks | USA; Jonathan McKee; Libby McKee | USA; Charlie McKee; Becky McKee | CAN; Thilo Giese; Beth Caulkin |
| 1998 Melbourne | AUS; Brett Young; Alan Blenkle | AUS; B. Paine | AUS; M. Conry |
| 1999 Hamana-Ko | AUS; Ben Nicholas; Thomas Winter | JPN; Ikuya Tanaka; Noriko Tanaka | JPN; George Motoyoshi; Natsuki Motoyoshi |
| 2001 Whitstable | USA; Carol Buchan; Carl Buchan | CAN; Thilo Giese; Sandra Towers | AUS; Craig McPhee; Kevin Kellow |
