= David Hudson =

David Hudson may refer to:

- David Hudson (pioneer) (1761–1836), American businessman, founder of Hudson, Ohio
- David Hudson (New York politician) (1782–1860), New York politician
- David J. Hudson (1943–2011), American sound engineer
- Dave Hudson (sailor) (born 1946), South African sailor
- Dave Hudson (born 1949), ice hockey player
- David Hudson (musician), Australian musician
