= William Gooderham =

William, Bill or Billy Gooderham may refer to members of the prominent Canadian Gooderham family, including

- William Gooderham Sr. (1790–1881), Canadian distiller, businessman, and banker
- William Gooderham Jr. (1824–1889), Canadian businessman and philanthropist, eldest son of William Sr.
- Bill Gooderham (1919–1979), Canadian Olympic sailor
- Billy Gooderham (born 1988), Canadian sailor in the 2011 ISAF Sailing World Championships, grandson of Bill Gooderham (1919–1979)
