= Stevie Morrison =

British yacht racer

Medal record

Sailing

Representing Great Britain

World Championships
Gold medal – first place	2001 Italy	Fireball
Gold medal – first place	2007 Cascais	49er
Silver medal – second place	2008 Sorrento	49er
Bronze medal – third place	2006 Aix-les-Bains	49er

European Championships
Gold medal – first place	2006 Weymouth	49er

Stephen James "Stevie" Morrison (born 25 November 1978, in Eastbourne) is a British yachtsman who has enjoyed success in a classes such as the International Cadet and the 49er. He is the son of Phil Morrison, the British yacht designer.

== Education ==
Morrison was educated at The Beacon Church of England Primary School, a voluntary aided state primary school in the port city of Exmouth in Devon, followed by Exeter School, a co-educational independent school in the city of Exeter (also in Devon), in South West England.

== Life and career ==
Together with teammate Ben Rhodes, Morrison became the 2007 World champion in the 49er dinghy. In 2008 they won the silver medal in the same event, behind the Australians Nathan Outteridge and Ben Austin, while in 2006 they won the bronze medal. That same year Morrison won the European 49er title.

== Other sailing results ==
Other achievements
2005 – Medemblik, Holland Regatta, (gold) 1st, 49er
2006 – Hyères, Semaine Olympique Française, (silver) 2nd, 49er
2007 – Miami, Rolex Miami OCR, (silver) , 2nd, 49er
2007 – Medemblik, Breitling Regatta, (bronze) , 3rd, 49er
