= Haylee Outteridge =

Australian sailor

Personal information
- Nationality: Australia

Sailing career
- Sport: Sailing
Medal record
Silver medal – second place	2018 Aarhus	Nacra 17
Silver medal – second place	2020 Geelong	Nacra 17

Haylee Outteridge is an Australian sailor, a resident of Lake Macquarie.

Haylee, (together with her brother Nathan) campaigned for the 2020 Summer Olympics in the mixed Nacra 17 class.

== Career ==
=== World Championships ===
Month,Year	Class	Event	Position
Feb 20	Nacra 17 - Mixed	49er, 49erFX & Nacra 17 World Championships Royal Geelong Yacht Club, AUS	2
Nov 19	Nacra 17 - Mixed	49er, 49erFX & Nacra 17 World Championships Auckland, NZL	13
Jul 18	Nacra 17 - Mixed	Hempel Sailing World Championships Aarhus 2018 Aarhus, DEN	2
Aug 17	49erFX - Women	49er & 49erFX World Championships Matosinhos, POR	18
Feb 16	49erFX - Women	49er & 49erFX World Championships Clearwater, Florida, USA	24
Sep 13	49erFX - Women	49erFX World Championship Marseille, FRA	14
Feb 12	Etchells - Open	Etchells World Championship Sydney, AUS	39
Jan 11	Moth - Open	Zhik - International Moth World Championship Sydney, AUS	71
Jul 09	29er - Open	29er World Championship Riva del Garda, ITA	3
