= Nathan Handley =

New Zealand sailor

Nathan Handley (born 17 May 1973) is a New Zealand sailor who competed in the Summer Olympics.

He represented New Zealand at the 2000 Summer Olympics he competed in the 49er with Dan Slater, finishing in 8th place. He won the 49er nationals for four consecutive years between 1997 and 2000.

After the Olympics, Handley joined Team New Zealand as a mid-bowman. He was part of the team's unsuccessful 2003 America's Cup defence.

He later became a coach and was involved with Peter Burling and Carl Evans at the 2008 Summer Olympics and with Polly Powrie and Jo Aleh at the 2016 Summer Olympics.
