= Nathan Outteridge =

Australian sailor

Personal information
- Nationality: Australia
- Born: 28 January 1986 (age 40) Newcastle NSW
- Height: 179 cm (5 ft 10 in)
- Weight: 75 kg (165 lb)

Sailing career
- Sport: Sailing
- Classes: 49er, Moth, F50
Medal record
Sailing
Representing Australia
Olympic Games
| Gold medal – first place | 2012 London | 49er |
| Silver medal – second place | 2016 Rio de Janeiro | 49er |
World Championships in Sailing
Youth Sailing World Championships
| Gold medal – first place | 2002 Youth | 29er |
| Gold medal – first place | 2003 Youth Madeira | 420 |
| Gold medal – first place | 2004 Youth Gdynia | 420 |
49er & 49er FX World Championships
| Gold medal – first place | 2008 Melbourne | 49er |
| Gold medal – first place | 2009 Riva del Garda | 49er |
| Gold medal – first place | 2011 Perth | 49er |
| Gold medal – first place | 2012 Zadar | 49er |
| Bronze medal – third place | 2007 Cascais | 49er |
| Bronze medal – third place | 2014 Santander | 49er |
Moth World Championship
| Gold medal – first place | 2011 Belmont | Moth |
| Gold medal – first place | 2014 Hampshire | Moth |
| Silver medal – second place | 2009 Cascade Locks | Moth |
| Silver medal – second place | 2013 Hawaii | Moth |
| Silver medal – second place | 2015 Sorrento | Moth |
Nacra 17 World Championship
| Silver medal – second place | 2018 Geelong | Nacra 17 |
| Silver medal – second place | 2020 Aarhus | Nacra 17 |
Sailing
- Updated on 21 November 2024

Nathan James Outteridge OAM (born 28 January 1986) is an Australian sailor, a resident of Lake Macquarie. He was inducted into the Australian Sailing Hall of Fame in 2025.

== Career highlights ==
=== Olympics ===
2008 – Beijing Olympics 5th, 49er (with Ben Austin)
2012 – London Olympics (gold) 1st, 49er (with Iain Jensen )
2016 – Rio Olympics (silver) 2nd, 49er (with Iain Jensen )

He is most famous for winning a gold medal at the London Olympics in the 49er class, along with Iain Jensen. At the Rio Olympics he won silver, again with Jensen in the 49er. He campaigned for the 2020 Olympics and qualified his country for the Nacra 17 class sailing with his sister Haylee gaining a 2nd place at the World Championships.

=== World Championships ===
| Year | Class | Title | Category | Location | Pos | Other | Ref |
|---|---|---|---|---|---|---|---|
| 2001-01 | 29er | 29er World Championship | Open | Kingston, Ontario, CAN | 8th | with Grant Rose | |
| 2001-12 | 29er | 29er World Championship | Open | Sydney, AUS | (silver) 2nd | with Grant Rose | |
| 2009-07 | 29er | 29er World Championship | Open | Riva del Garda, ITA | 2nd place, silver medalist(s) | with Lauren Jeffries (AUS) | |
| 2002-08 | 29er | 32nd ISAF Youth Sailing World Championships | Male Youth | Lunenburg, CAN | 1st place, gold medalist(s) | with Ayden Menzies (AUS) | |
| 2003-01 | 420 | 33rd ISAF Youth Sailing World Championships | Male Youth | Madeira, POR | 1st place, gold medalist(s) | with Ayden Menzies (AUS) | |
| 2004-07 | 420 | 34th ISAF Youth Sailing World Championships | Male Youth | Gdynia, POL | 1st place, gold medalist(s) | with Iain Jensen (AUS) | |
| 2004-01 | 420 | 420 World Championships | Male and Mixed | Melbourne, VIC, AUS | (bronze) 3rd | with Ayden Menzies (AUS) | |
| 2004-04 | Laser Radial | Youth ILCA 6 World Championships | Youth | Queensland, AUS | 2nd place, silver medalist(s) | | |
| 2003-08 | 470 | 470 Junior World Championships | Open Juniors | Neusiedlersee, AUT | 7th | with Ayden Menzies (AUS) | |
| 2004-08 | 470 | 470 Junior World Championships | Open Juniors | Lake Garda, ITA | 4th | with Ayden Menzies (AUS) | |
| 2003-09 | 470 | 470 World Championships | Male | Neusiedlersee, AUT | 48th | with Ayden Menzies (AUS) | |
| 2004-05 | 470 | 470 World Championships | Male | Zadar | 36th | with Ayden Menzies (AUS) | |
| 2006-06 | 49er | 49er & 49er FX World Championships | Open | Aix Les Bains, FRA | 6th | with Ben Austin (AUS) | |
| 2007-06 | 49er | 49er & 49er FX World Championships | Open | Cascais | (bronze) 3rd | with Ben Austin (AUS) | |
| 2008-01 | 49er | 49er & 49er FX World Championships | Open | Melbourne, Australia | 1st place, gold medalist(s) | with Ben Austin (AUS) | |
| 2009-07 | 49er | 49er & 49er FX World Championships | Open | Riva del Garda, ITA | (gold) 1st | with Iain Jensen (AUS) | |
| 2010-01 | 49er | 49er & 49er FX World Championships | Open | Freeport, BAH | (silver) 2nd | with Iain Jensen (AUS) | |
| 2011-12 | 49er | 49er & 49er FX World Championships | Open | Perth, Australia | 1st place, gold medalist(s) | with Iain Jensen (AUS) | |
| 2012-05 | 49er | 49er & 49er FX World Championships | Open | Zadar, Croatia | 1st place, gold medalist(s) | with Iain Jensen (AUS) | |
| 2013-09 | 49er | 49er & 49er FX World Championships | Male | Marseille, FRA | 5th | with Iain Jensen (AUS) | |
| 2014-09 | 49er | 49er & 49er FX World Championships | Male | Santander, ESP | 3rd place, bronze medalist(s) | with Iain Jensen (AUS) | |
| 2015-11 | 49er | 49er & 49er FX World Championships | Male | ARG | 2nd place, silver medalist(s) | with Iain Jensen (AUS) | |
| 2016-02 | 49er | 49er & 49er FX World Championships | Male | Clearwater, Florida, USA | 6th | with Iain Jensen (AUS) | |
| 2009-08 | Moth | Moth World Championship | Open | Cascade Locks, Oregon | 2nd place, silver medalist(s) | | |
| 2014-07 | Moth | Moth World Championship | Open | Hayling Island, GBR | 1st place, gold medalist(s) | | |
| 2011-11 | Moth | Moth World Championship | Open | Belmont, Australia | (gold) 1st | | |
| 2013-10 | Moth | Moth World Championship | Open | Hawaii, USA | 2nd place, silver medalist(s) | | |
| 2015-00 | Moth | Moth World Championship | Open | Sorrento, AUS | 2nd place, silver medalist(s) | | |
| 2009-01 | A Class | A-Cat World Championship | Open | Belmont, NSW, AUS | 11th | | |
| 2014-02 | A Class | A-Cat World Championship | Open | Auckland, NZL | 6th | | |
| 2009-06 | Farr 40 | Farr 40 World Championship | Open | Sardinia, ITA | 9th | | |
| 2011-02 | Farr 40 | Farr 40 World Championship | Open | Sydney, AUS | 5th | + Crew | |
| 2010-04 | Farr 40 | Farr 40 World Championship | Open | Casa de Campo, DOM | 4th | + Crew | |
| 2010-09 | Melges 32 | Melges 32 World Championship | Open | San Francisco, USA | 9th | + Crew | |
| 2011-03 | 505 (dinghy) | 505 World Championship | Open | Hamilton, AUS | 9th | with | |
| 2011-05 | SB20 | SB20 World Championship | Open | Torbay, GBR | 12th | with | |
| 2012-09 | Farr 40 | Farr 40 World Championship | Open | Chicago, USA | 3rd place, bronze medalist(s) | + Crew | |
| 2014-08 | RC-44 | RC44 World Championship | Open | Marstrand Island, SWE | 10th | + Crew | |
| 2018-18 | Nacra 17 | Nacra 17 World Championship | Mixed | Geelong, AUS | 2nd place, silver medalist(s) | with Haylee Outteridge (AUS) | |
| 2019-11 | Nacra 17 | Nacra 17 World Championship | Mixed | Auckland, NZL | 13th | with Haylee Outteridge (AUS) | |
| 2020-02 | Nacra 17 | Nacra 17 World Championship | Mixed | Aarhus, DEN | 2nd place, silver medalist(s) | with Haylee Outteridge (AUS) | |

Together with teammate Ben Austin Outteridge became the 2008 World Champion in the 49er boat by finishing in front of Britons Stevie Morrison and Ben Rhodes. In 2007 they won the bronze medal in the same event at the World Championships in Cascais, Portugal. He is an Australian Institute of Sport scholarship holder.

=== America's Cup ===
In September 2012, he joined Artemis Racing for the final ACWS event in San Francisco and has since joined for the America's Cup in 2013. Nathan was one of the helmsmen for Artemis Racing the Challenger of Record for the 2013 America's Cup. He also skippered Artemis in the Louis Vuitton challenger series for the 2017 America's Cup, losing to Emirates Team New Zealand's. He became the skipper for the defending Team New Zealand in the 2024 America's Cup. Team New Zealand successfully defended the America's Cup against Ineos Britannia. In May 2025, Emirates Team New Zealand announced Outerridge as skipper of the team's defence of the 38th America's Cup, scheduled to be held in 2027.

=== SailGP ===
In 2019 Outteridge skippered the Japanese team in the inaugural SailGP season, and the following season, sailing in F50 foiling catamarans.

In 2025, it was announced that he would helm the new Artemis SailGP team, based in Sweden. This came to fruition in 2026, as Outteridge acts as Driver for the Artemis team, seeing success throughout the season.

=== Other events ===
2005 – Sydney, Sydney International Regatta, (gold) 1st, 49er
2007 – Medemblik, Breitling Regatta, (silver) 2nd, 49er
2007 – Sydney, Sydney International Regatta, (gold) 1st, 49er (with Ben Austin)
2010 – Silvaplana, International Moth Class Euro Championship, (gold) 1st, Moth
2012 – Wangi Wangi, New South Wales, (silver) 2nd, International A-Class Catamaran
2019 – SailGP Runner up skippering Team Japan, F50
