= Circolo Vela Torbole =

Italian sailing club

- Burgee
- Short name: CVT
- Founded: 1964; 62 years ago
- Location: Torbole, Lake Garda, Italy
- Website: www.circolovelatorbole.com

The Circolo Vela Torbole (CVT) is a sailing club founded in 1964 and is based in Torbole on the banks of the Lake Garda in Northern Italy.

== History ==
Founded on the 23 June 1964, the club was recognized by the Italian Sailing Federation (FIV) only three years later, in October 1967. The club in May 1965 got permission from the local government of Nago-Torbole to develop the club on an area adjacent to the Adige-Garda tunnel were the club is still based partly on reclaimed land.

The club has hosted many sailing world championships including those for the 5.5 metre, B14, Europe, J/70, Melges 24, Moth, SB20, Sunifsh and Tempest classes.

== Other Lake Garda Clubs ==
- Circolo Vela Arco
- Circolo Vela Gargnano
- Circolo Surf Torbole
- Fraglia Vela Malcesine ASD
- Fraglia Vela Riva
- Lega Navale Italiana Riva del Garda
- Vela Club Campione del Garda
- Vela Club Campione Sul Garda
