= Roma Sail Week =

Defunct sailing regatta

- First held: 1974
- Venue: Anzio
- Website: www.afterweb.com/svir/

Roma Sail Week (Italian: Settimana Olimpica Italiana, lit. 'Italian Olympic Week') was a sailing regatta organised in Anzio, Italy. The regatta usually took place at the end of March or the beginning of April and usually attracted around 600 sailors from 20 countries.

The first Roma Sail Week was held in 1974. It was part of the Eurolymp circuit. It was considered a major regatta by the Finn class.

The 2002 edition was cancelled.

== Winners ==
=== Europe ===
- 1994 – Shirley Robertson (GBR)
- 1995 – Shirley Robertson (GBR)
- 1996 – Margriet Matthijsse (NED)
- 1997 – Aisling Bowman (IRL)
- 1998 – Margriet Matthijsse (NED)
- 1999 – Weronika Glinkiewicz (POL)
- 2000 – Weronika Glinkiewicz (POL)
- 2001 – Katarzyna Brzóska (POL)

=== Finn ===
- 1982 – Wolfgang Gerz (FRG)
- 1983 – Bengtsson (SWE)
- 1984 – Mark Neeleman (NED)
- 1985 – Thomas Oljelund (SWE)
- 1987 – Arnold Hummel (NED)
- 1988 – Othmar Müller von Blumencron (FRG)
- 1989 – Armanto Ortolano (GRE)
- 1991 – Eric Mergenthaler (MEX)
- 1993 – Luca Devoti (ITA)
- 1994 – Emanuele Vaccari (ITA)
- 1995 – Hank Lammens (CAN)
- 1996 – Oleg Khopyorsky (RUS)
- 1997 – Aimilios Papathanasiou (GRE)
- 1998 – Mateusz Kusznierewicz (POL)
- 1999 – Aimilios Papathanasiou (GRE)
- 2000 – Aimilios Papathanasiou (GRE)
- 2001 – Aimilios Papathanasiou (GRE)

=== Laser ===
- 1994 – Diego Negri (ITA)
- 1995 – John Harrysson (SWE)
- 1996 – Francesco Bruni (ITA)
- 1997 – Diego Negri (ITA)
- 1998 – Diego Negri (ITA)
- 1999 – Diego Negri (ITA)
- 2000 – Diego Negri (ITA)
- 2001 – Diego Negri (ITA)

=== Men's 470 ===
- 1994 – Lorenzo Bressani (ITA)
- 1995 – John Merricks (GBR)
- 1996 – Matteo Ivaldi & Michele Ivaldi (ITA)
- 1997 – Iordanis Paschalidis & Thanasis Pakhoumas (GRE)
- 1998 – Lorenzo Bressani & Andrea Trani (ITA)
- 1999 – Matteo Ivaldi (ITA)
- 2000 – Matteo Ivaldi (ITA)
- 2001 – Gabrio Zandonà (ITA)

=== Women's 470 ===
- 1995 – Federica Salvà (ITA)
- 1996 – Federica Salvà & Emanuela Sossi (ITA)
- 1997 – Vlada Kravchun & Nataliya Gaponovich (UKR)
- 1998 – Sofia Bekatorou & Emilia Tsoulfa (GRE)
- 1999 – Federica Salvà (ITA)
- 2000 – Federica Salvà (ITA)
- 2001 – Janja Orel (SLO)

=== 49er ===
- 1998 – Francesco Bruni & Gabriele Bruni (ITA)
- 1999 – Francesco Bruni (ITA)

=== Soling ===
- 1998 – Sverre Samdahl, Piergiorgio Bosello & Michael Griffith (NOR)

=== Star ===
- 1994 – Roberto Benamati (ITA)
- 1995 – Enrico Chieffi (ITA)
- 1996 – Anastasios Bountouris & Dimitrios Boukis (GRE)
- 1999 – Pietro D'Alì (ITA)
- 2000 – Pietro D'Alì (ITA)

=== Dart ===
- 1998 – Giorgio Santini & Maura Barbieri (ITA)

=== Formula 18 ===
- 1997 – Vittorio Richelmy & Giulio Pennisi (ITA)
- 1998 – Paolo Clemente & Fabrizio Clemente (ITA)

=== Hobie 16 ===
- 1997 – Mario Bianchi & Simone Chelini (ITA)
- 1998 – Enrico Maltagliati & Elena Dusi (ITA)

=== Hobie 18 ===
- 1997 – Giovanni Passarelli & Daniela Baldi (ITA)
- 1998 – Giovanni Passarelli & Daniela Baldi (ITA)

=== Tornado ===
- 1995 – Walter Pirinoli (ITA)
- 1998 – Lorenzo Giacomo Bodini (ITA)

=== Men's Mistral ===
- 1994 – Paco Wirz (ITA)
- 1995 – Asier Fernández (ESP)
- 1996 – Riccardo Giordano (ITA)
- 1997 – Tony Philp (FRA)
- 1998 – Mirosław Małek (POL)
- 1999 – Riccardo Giordano (ITA)
- 2000 – Christoph Sieber (AUT)
- 2001 – Iván Pastor (ESP)

=== Women's Mistral ===
- 1994 – Helene Cardon (FRA)
- 1995 – Elena Draoulec (FRA)
- 1996 – Valeria Zullo (ITA)
- 1997 – Alessandra Sensini (ITA)
- 1998 – Alessandra Sensini (ITA)
- 1999 – Alessandra Sensini (ITA)
- 2000 – Alessandra Sensini (ITA)
