= B14 World Championship =

Dinghy sailing regatta

The B14 World Championship is an bi-annual international sailing regatta of B14 (dinghy), organized by the host club on behalf of the International B14 Class Association and recognized by World Sailing, the sports IOC recognized governing body. The final edition of the Worlds happened in 2025 with the class withdrawing it status in November 2025

== Events ==
Host cities of the World Championship

Ed.			Hosts			Sailor			Boats				Ref.
No	Day/Month	Year	Host club	City	Country	No.	Nat.	Cont.	Boats			Mix	Ref.
1	-	1998	Weymouth Sailing Centre	Weymouth	United Kingdom	100	7	3	50	38	0	12	
2	14-21 Jan	2000	Sydney Flying Squadron	Sydney	Australia	80	6	3	40				
3	12-16 Sept	2001	Circolo Vela Torbole	Lake Garda	Italy	84	4	3	42	31	1	10	
4	-	2003	McCrae Yacht Club	Melbourne	Australia	60	2	2	30	22	1	7	
5	19–24 July	2004	Circolo Vela Torbole	Lake Garda	Italy	74	2	2	37	28	0	9	
6	-	2005	Woollahra Sailing Club	Sydney	Australia	72	3+	2+	36				
7	8–13 July	2007	Restronguet Sailing Club	Restronguet	United Kingdom	76	2	2	38	30	0	8	
8	6-11 Jan	2009	Royal Yacht Club of Tasmania	Hobart	Australia	100	2	2	50	39	1	10	
9	12–16 July	2010	Yacht Club de Carnac	Carnac	France	78	3	2	39	27	1	11	
N/A	-	2012	Perth Dinghy Sailing Club	Perth	Australia	CANCELLED							
10	15–19 July	2013	CN Plérin sur mer	Plerin	France	60	3	2	30	20	0	10	
11	27 Dec to 6 Jan	2014	McCrae Yacht Club	McRea	Australia	80	3	2	40	23	0	17	
12	21–23 June	2016	Circolo Vela Torbole	Garda	Italy	70	3	2	35	26	0	9	
13	1-6 Jan	2018	Port Dalrymple Yacht Club		Australia	68	3	3	34	24	0	10	
14	25 July to 2 Aug	2019	Yacht Club de Carnac	Carnac	France	64	4	2	32	23	0	9	
N/A	3-7 Jan	2021	Woollahra Sailing Club	Sydney	Australia	CANCELLED DUE TO COVID							
N/A	4–14 July	2022	Circolo Vela Torbole	Lake Garda	Italy	CANCELLED DUE TO COVID							
15	Jul	2023	Circolo Vela Torbole	Nago–Torbole, Lake Garda	Italy	41	4	2	20	15	0	5	
16	6-10 Jan	2025	Woollahra Sailing Club	Rose Bay, Sydney	Australia	60	3	2	30	13	0	17	

== Multiple champions ==
Compiled from the medallist table below up to and including 2023.

Ranking	Sailor	Gold	Silver	Bronze	Total	No. Entries
1	Tim Fells (GBR)	4	2	1	7	8
2	Guy Bancroft (AUS)	3	1	2	6	9
3	Shaun Barber (GBR)	3	1	0	4	4
4	Nick Craig (GBR)	2	0	2	4	6
5	Toby Lewis (GBR)	2	0	1	3	3

== Medalists ==
Year	Gold	Silver	Bronze
1998 Weymouth	GBR704; Richard Lovering (GBR); Dick Parker (GBR)	GBR718; Tim Fells (GBR); Richard Dowsett (GBR)	GBR707; Nick Peters (GBR); Craig Davis (GBR)
2000 Sydney	GBR718 - AT&T; Tim Fells; Richard Dowsett (GBR)	GBR743 - Slippery; Richard Lovering; Ian Lovering (GBR)	GBR744; Rob Larke (GBR); Roz Allen (GBR)
2001 Torbole	GBR 761; Steve Lovegrove (GBR); Shaun Barber (GBR)	GBR-758; Tim Fells (GBR); Richard Dowsett (GBR)	GBR-749; David Hayes; Sean Dwyer (GBR)
2003 Melbourne	GBR 758 - AT&T; Tim Fells (GBR); David Cunningham (GBR)	GBR 746 - Snatch; Jono Pank (GBR); Shaun Barber (GBR)	AUS 357 - Buggar the Bone; Guy Bancroft (AUS); Rhys Bancroft (AUS)
2004 Torbole	GBR-758 - AT&T; Tim Fells (GBR); Shaun Barber (GBR)	GBR-725; Matt Searle (GBR); Andy Ramus (GBR)	AUS-367; Martin Johnson (AUS); Mike Halkes (AUS)
2006 Sydney	Gutted Hedgehog; Matt Searle (GBR); Andy Ramus (GBR)	PICA; Jamie Mears (GBR); Matt Gill (GBR)	AT&T; Tim Fells (GBR); Sean Dwyer (GBR)
2007 Falmouth	AT&T; Tim Fells (GBR); Shaun Barber (GBR)	Guy Bancroft (AUS); James Patterson (AUS)	Chris Bines (GBR); Dave Gibbons (GBR)
2009 Hobart	Guy Bancroft (AUS); Nick Darlow (AUS)	Mark Barnes (GBR); Pete NICHOLSON (GBR)	Nick RICHARDSON (AUS); Alan NICHOLAS (AUS)
2010 Carnac	Guy Bancroft (AUS); David Grace (AUS)	Scott Cunningham (AUS); Jason Walker (AUS)	Nick Craig (GBR); Matt Johnson (GBR)
2013 Plerin	Tim Harrison (GBR); Jonny Ratcliffe (GBR)	Ben McGrane (GBR); Roz McGrane (GBR)	Richard Reynolds (AUS); Lissa McMillan (AUS)
2015 McRae	Guy Bancroft (AUS); Lachlan Imeneo (AUS)	Brent Frankcombe (AUS); Leigh Dunstan (AUS)	Ian Cunningham (AUS); David Cunningham (AUS)
2016 Garda	AUS 371 - BANG BANG; Rick Plain (AUS); Mike Vincent (AUS)	GBR 758; Tim Harrison (GBR); Jonathan Ratcliffe (GBR)	AUS 793 - Bonus; Guy Bancroft (AUS); Dave Grace (AUS)
2018 AUS	GBR 796 - Harken/Sandline; Nick Craig (GBR); Toby Lewis (GBR)	AUS 372 - The Hitcher; Robbie Hunt (AUS); Ben Price (AUS)	AUS 373 - Bone Work; Ian Cunningham (AUS); David Cunningham (AUS)
2019 Carnac	GBR 796; Nick Craig (GBR); Toby Lewis (GBR)	Craig Garmston (AUS); Louis Chapam (AUS)	Richard Reynolds (AUS); Lissa McMillian (AUS)
2023 Garda	GBR 797; Mark Watts (GBR); Matt Johnson (GBR)	AUS 375; Craig Garmston (AUS); Paul Fleming (AUS)	GBR 796; Nick Craig (GBR); Toby Lewis (GBR)
2025	IRL 774; Chris Bateman (IRL); Lucy Loughton (IRL)	GBR 801; Nick Craig (GBR); Toby Lewis (GBR)	AUS 375; Craig Garmston (AUS); Paul Fleming (AUS)
