= Ben Austin (sailor) =

Australian sailor

Personal information
- Full name: Benjamin Austin
- Born: 16 July 1982 (age 43) Sydney, New South Wales
- Height: 185 cm (6 ft 1 in)
- Weight: 78 kg (172 lb)

Sailing career
- Sport: Sailing
- Club: Woollahra Sailing Club
- Coached by: Emmett Lazich
- Class: 49er
Medal record
Sailing
Representing Australia
World Championships
Gold medal – first place	2008 Melbourne	49er

Benjamin Austin (born 16 July 1982) is an Australian sailor. He competed for Australia at the 2008 Summer Olympics.

Together with teammate Nathan Outteridge, Austin became the 2008 World Champion in the 49er boat by finishing in front of Britons Stevie Morrison and Ben Rhodes. In 2007 they won the bronze medal in the same event at the World Championships in Cascais, Portugal. He was an Australian Institute of Sport scholarship holder.

== Career highlights ==
World Championships
2007 – Cascais, (bronze) 3rd, 49er (with Nathan Outteridge)
2008 – Melbourne, (gold) 1st, 49er (with Nathan Outteridge)
Other achievements
2007 – Sydney, Sydney International Regatta, (gold) 1st, 49er (with Nathan Outteridge)
