= 2014 ISAF Sailing World Championships – Women's 470 =

2014 Women's sailing competition

Women's 470 at the 2014 ISAF Sailing World Championships
- Venue: Santander, Spain
- Dates: 14–20 September
- Competitors: 108 from 29 nations

Medalists
gold medal	Lara Vadlau; Jolanta Ogar	Austria
silver medal	Jo Aleh; Polly Powrie	New Zealand
bronze medal	Hannah Mills; Saskia Clark	Great Britain

The women's 470 class at the 2014 ISAF Sailing World Championships was held in Santander, Spain 14–20 September.

== Results ==
Results of individual races
Pos	Crew	Country	I	II	III	IV	V	VI	VII	VIII	IX	X	MR	Tot	Pts
Gold medal	Lara Vadlau; Jolanta Ogar	Austria	2	11^{†}	1	5	1	5	1	11	4	2	2	45	34
Silver medal	Jo Aleh; Polly Powrie	New Zealand	7^{†}	5	6	2	5	1	4	2	3	5	12	52	45
Bronze medal	Hannah Mills; Saskia Clark	Great Britain	11	2	1	3	11	9	14^{†}	3	2	4	4	64	50
4	Camille Lecointre; Hélène Defrance	France	3	5	4	4	24^{†}	10	6	4	5	15	8	88	64
5	Tina Mrak; Veronika Macarol	Slovenia	4	11	14	1	4	15^{†}	12	5	6	8	6	86	71
6	Michelle Broekhuizen; Marieke Jongens	Netherlands	4	13	3	1	9	7	9	17^{†}	10	6	10	89	72
7	Anne Haeger; Briana Provancha	United States	14	7	2	3	7	4	2	6	DNF 28^{†}	14	16	103	75
8	Ai Kondo Yoshida; Miho Yoshioka	Japan	7	25^{†}	4	10	3	12	5	16	14	3	14	113	88
9	Christina Bassadone; Eilidh McIntyre	Great Britain	16	19^{†}	3	5	12	2	8	13	12	1	18	109	90
10	Afrodite Zegers; Anneloes van Veen	Netherlands	1	10	5	17^{†}	14	8	15	1	13	7	20	111	94
11	Alisa Kirilyuk; Lyudmila Dmitriyeva	Russia	18	6	19	4	6	3	3	22^{†}	7	12	–	100	78
12	Renata Decnop; Isabel Swan	Brazil	17	14	9	6	2	DNF 28^{†}	13	10	1	9	–	109	81
13	Fernanda Oliveira; Ana Barbachan	Brazil	1	3	16	UFD 28^{†}	8	6	7	15	8	17	–	109	81
14	Anna Burnet; Flora Stewart	Great Britain	9	12	17	8	15	13	10	19^{†}	9	13	–	125	106
15	Chen Shasha; Gao Haiyan	China	6	9	2	6	25^{†}	18	19	21	20	11	–	137	112
16	Xiaomei Xu; Ping Zhang	China	6	3	21	7	13	11	11	25^{†}	16	25	–	138	113
17	Agnieszka Skrzypulec; Natalia Wojcik	Poland	15	18	13	2	16	16	22^{†}	8	21	10	–	141	119
18	Huimin Feng; Lizhu Huang	China	5	1	14	12	23	17	25^{†}	9	15	23	–	144	119
19	Maëlenn Lemaitre; Aloïse Retornaz	France	2	1	8	DSQ 28^{†}	10	24	20	23	11	21	–	148	120
20	Marina Gallego; Fatima Reyes	Spain	10	17	6	13	20	21	17	14	18	26^{†}	–	162	136
21	Bárbara Cornudella; Sara López	Spain	8	10	10	18	17	22	16	26^{†}	19	18	–	164	138
22	Ángela Pumariega; Patricia Cantero	Spain	3	4	26^{†}	10	18	20	18	24	22	19	–	164	138
23	Elena Berta; Giulia Paolillo	Italy	12	4	20	14	19	14	23^{†}	18	17	20	–	161	138
24	Linda Fahrni; Maja Siegenthaler	Switzerland	11	2	8	15	21	25^{†}	21	20	25	16	–	164	139
25	Sara Carmo; Matilde Pinheiro de Melo	Portugal	13	8	24^{†}	11	22	19	24	7	23	22	–	173	149
26	Carrie Smith; Jaime Ryan	Australia	8	22	5	15	RET 28^{†}	23	26	12	24	27	–	190	162
27	Hanka Chudejova; Lenka Mrzílková	Czech Republic	10	8	11	24	26	DNF 28^{†}	DNF 28	DNF 28	26	24	–	213	185
28	Amy Seabright; Anna Carpenter	Great Britain	19	23^{†}	7	7	4	8	17	1	1	–	–	87	64
29	Annina Wagner; Elisabeth Panuschka	Germany	14	13	24^{†}	8	1	2	11	12	4	–	–	89	65
30	Annika Bochmann; Karoline Göltzer	Germany	20	7	21	9	8	1	23^{†}	4	2	–	–	95	72
31	Natalia Ivanova; Nadezhda Gerasimova	Russia	22^{†}	15	11	9	7	10	7	7	7	–	–	95	73
32	Sasha Ryan; Amelia Catt	Australia	13	12	15	16	2	5	18^{†}	18	6	–	–	105	87
33	Roberta Caputo; Alice Sinno	Italy	19	21^{†}	12	20	5	13	4	15	3	–	–	112	91
34	Marjaliisa Umb; Elise Umb	Estonia	9	9	18	23^{†}	11	20	3	17	5	–	–	115	92
35	Noya Bar-Am; Rimon Shushan	Israel	15	17	13	17	3	3	9	UFD 28^{†}	16	–	–	121	93
36	Sydney Bolger; Carly Shevitz	United States	21^{†}	6	18	16	6	15	10	3	19	–	–	114	93
37	Francesca Komatar; Sveva Carraro	Italy	20	22^{†}	17	19	9	7	2	13	10	–	–	119	97
38	Nadja Horwitz; Carmina Malsch	Chile	5	23	9	21	26^{†}	12	12	2	13	–	–	123	97
39	Yui Matsushita; Yuka Tsutsumi	Japan	25^{†}	15	19	14	15	14	1	5	14	–	–	122	97
40	Anna Kyselova; Anastasiya Winkel	Ukraine	23	24^{†}	20	19	10	4	6	8	17	–	–	131	107
41	Enia Ninčević; Romana Župan	Croatia	21	16	22^{†}	18	16	9	16	9	8	–	–	135	113
42	Julia Toroi; Mikaela Wulff	Finland	12	20	22	12	13	21	5	UFD 28^{†}	18	–	–	151	123
43	Cassandre Blandin; Bérénice Delpuech	France	24^{†}	16	7	22	23	6	14	16	23	–	–	151	127
44	Jess Lavery; Megan Brickwood	Great Britain	16	18	26^{†}	25	20	25	8	11	9	–	–	158	132
45	Nadine Boehm; Ann-Christin Goliaß	Germany	25^{†}	24	23	21	22	11	13	10	11	–	–	160	135
46	Sofía Toro; Laura Sarasola	Spain	18	20	12	13	12	16	DNF 28^{†}	UFD 28	22	–	–	169	141
47	Dimitra Pagida; Alina Stratigiou	Greece	17	27^{†}	10	24	24	22	15	20	15	–	–	174	147
48	Alba Bou Serra; Julia Subira	Spain	22	19	15	22	25^{†}	19	21	14	20	–	–	177	152
49	Lucy Shephard; Emma Barton	Australia	24	25	25	11	14	DNF 28^{†}	25	19	12	–	–	183	155
50	Ceyla Yurtseven; Ceren Celayir	Turkey	27	26	23	25	21	18	19	6	UFD 28^{†}	–	–	193	165
51	Allison Surrette; Alexandra ten Hove	Canada	26^{†}	26	16	20	18	23	20	22	21	–	–	192	166
52	Rosa Lindqvist; Rosemarie Hartman	Finland	23	14	27^{†}	23	19	24	22	23	24	–	–	199	172
53	Orsolya Sipos; Zsofia Sipos	Hungary	27^{†}	27	27	26	17	17	24	21	25	–	–	211	184
54	Eva Peternelj; Valentina Baruca	Slovenia	26	21	25	26	27	DNF 28^{†}	DNF 28	DNF 28	DNF 28	–	–	237	209

Scoring system: low-point system; Source:
Legend: – Qualified for medal race(s); DNF – Did not finish; DSQ – Disqualified; RET – Retired; UFD – "U" flag disqualification; † – Discarded race not counted in the overall result;
