= Jonathan McKee =

American sailor

Personal information
- Full name: Jonathan Dunn McKee
- Born: December 19, 1959 (age 66) Seattle, Washington, U.S.
- Height: 5 ft 9 1/2 in (177 cm)

Sailing career
- Sport: Sailing
- College team: Yale University
- Club: Seattle Yacht Club
- Classes: 49er, Tasar, Melges 24, Moth, Melges 20, Melges 32, Volvo 70, Flying Dutchman
Medal record
Sailing
Representing the United States
Olympic Games
Gold medal – first place	1984 Los Angeles	Flying Dutchman
Bronze medal – third place	2000 Sydney	49er

Jonathan Dunn McKee (born December 19, 1959, in Seattle, Washington) is an American sailor and Olympic Champion.

== Sailing career ==
=== Olympics ===
He competed in the Flying Dutchman class at the 1984 Summer Olympics in Los Angeles and won a gold medal, with William Carl Buchan to become the only American to win the gold medal in the Flying Dutchman class during the boats participation in the Olympic games.

McKee competed in the 49er class at the 2000 Summer Olympics in Sydney together with his brother Charles McKee, and they won the bronze medal.

=== America Cup ===
McKee and his brother sailed for OneWorld in the 2003 Louis Vuitton Cup and for Luna Rossa Challenge in the 2007 Louis Vuitton Cup. He sailed the 2008–09 Volvo Ocean Race on Il Mostro.

=== World Championships ===
- 1983 Flying Dutchman Class World Champion
- 2001 49er World Champion
- 2023 Double Handed ORCi World Championship sailing a Jeanneau Sunfast 3300

Two times Tasar Class World Champion

- 1996 Seattle Yacht Club, Cascade Locks, USA
- 2007 Cape Panwa Hotel, Phuket, Thailand

Three times Melges 24 World Champion

- 2005, Key Largo, Florida
- 2010
- 2011

=== Offshore Sailing ===
He competed in the 2008 Barcelona World Race onboard Estrella Damm, retiring into Cape Town

He competed in the 2008-09 Volvo Ocean Race round the world race.
