= Exeter School =

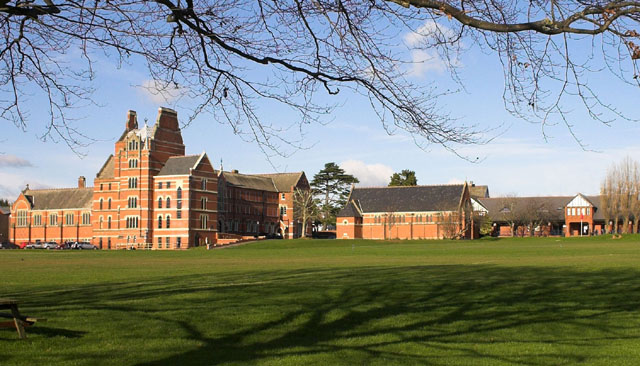

Location
- Victoria Park Road; Exeter, Devon, EX2 4NS; England; 50°43′10″N 3°30′43″W

Information
- Type: Private day school
- Motto: Classical Greek: ΧΡΥΣΟΣ ΑΡΕΤΗΣ ΟΥΚ ΑΝΤΑΞΙΟΣ – Gold is not worth more than virtue.
- Established: 1633; 393 years ago
- Department for Education URN: 113607 Tables
- Chair of Governors: Gillian Hodgetts
- Head: Dr Adrian Rainbow
- Gender: Co-educational
- Age: 3 to 18
- Enrollment: 1,046
- Sixth form students: 198
- Campuses: Exeter Pre-Prep School, Exminster Exeter School, Victoria Park Road, Exeter
- Campus size: 25 acres
- Houses: 5
- Alumni name: Old Exonians
- Former pupils: Old Exonians
- Website: https://www.exeterschool.org.uk/

Exeter School is a private co-educational day school for pupils between the ages of 3 and 18 in Exeter, Devon, England. The younger year groups are based at Exeter Pre-Prep School in Exminster, which was previously known as The New School. In 2019, there were around 200 pupils in the Junior School and 700 in the Senior School.

== History ==
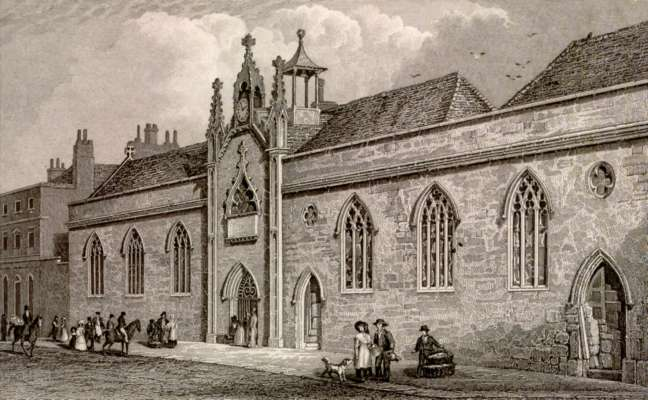
St John's Hospital site of the school from 1633 to 1878

The School traces its origins from the opening of the Exeter Free Grammar School on 1 August 1633, attended mainly by the sons of the City freemen. Exeter's wealthy merchants, notably Thomas Walker, provided the finance, with sufficient bequests to pay the Headmaster £50 a year and to install the school in the medieval buildings of St John's Hospital, which had stood on the south side of the High Street since the 12th century.

In 1878, the school opened as Exeter Grammar School at a new campus designed by noted architect William Butterfield. The school occupies this 25-acre (10 ha) site on Victoria Park Road to this day. The cost at the time was £7,600 with a further £16,750 spent on the erection of buildings. It was decided that St John's Hospital Trust had to pay to Exeter School the net annual income of all endowments for Exhibitions and Scholarships attached to the School, and it also had to pay a proportion of the residue of its income.

In 1920, the Governors of Exeter School decided that it was no longer possible for the school to continue without considerable assistance. The Exeter Education Authority agreed to assist, but only if the school came under its direct control, so in April 1921, control of the school was handed over to the city. It then became a "maintained" school until 1929, when it became an "aided" school, thus regaining charge of its own finances under a newly appointed Governing Body.

In March 1945, the status of the school changed again, becoming a direct grant grammar school, and it remained as such until September 1975 when the scheme was abolished. In September 1976, the first "private" pupils were admitted to the school.

From 1979, the School participated in the Assisted Places Scheme, taking over 200 pupils at its peak, but the scheme was abolished by the government in 1997 and the last of those pupils left in the summer of 2004. In 1981, the Sixth Form became coeducational. Following the success of the move, girls were admitted to all years in 1997.

In 2024 the school announced it would rename its ten houses after topographical features rather than benefactors and historical figures.

A new Head joined the school in September 2026 - Dr Adrian Rainbow came to the school from a previous headship at London Park School Mayfair, formerly known as Eaton Square Senior School.

== Academic standards ==
In November 2024, the Independent Schools Inspectorate reported upon four areas: the leadership and management, and governance; the quality of education, training and recreation; pupils' physical and mental health and emotional wellbeing; pupils' social and economic education and contribution to society.

The report concluded that the 3–18 co-educational day school met all the relevant standards.

The team of eight reported that "the school's commitment to safeguarding ensures that every pupil can thrive academically and emotionally in a secure environment, with a dedicated and responsive system in place to protect their wellbeing."

The report also commented on the excellent relationships between staff and pupils, where learning is seen as a co-operative venture. "Warm relationships between staff and pupils create a safe and supportive environment."

The report continues that 'pupils are well-prepared for the next steps in their education journey', which was recognised in 2026 by the school winning the TalkEducation Awards for Innovation in Education's category for Support for life beyond school.

In 2026, Exeter School achieved a set of very good A Level results with a 100% pass rate. 23% of all grades were A*, ten times the national total, and 56% of grades were either A* or A. 80% of all grades were A*, A or B.

Summer 2026's GCSE results were also excellent; 70% were 9-7 grades. Of the 122 pupils in Year 11, 63 achieved 8 or more 9-7 grades, with 33 pupils scoring ten or more 9-7 grades.

In December 2024, The Sunday Times named Exeter School 'South-West Independent Secondary School of the Year 2024'. The 25th edition of its annual Schools Guide, Parent Power, awarded the top place to the co-educational independent school, based on its outstanding academic achievements and overall educational provision.

== Fees ==
As of September 2026, the day fees are £5,729 per term for the junior school (including lunch) and £7,740 per term for the senior school. In September 2016, Exeter School launched eight free places in the Senior School and Sixth Form, as a result of donations and legacies from former pupils, in addition to ongoing grants from a local charity.

== Notable former pupils ==
- Andrea Angel, chemist who died in the 1917 Silvertown explosion
- Michael Aron, British Ambassador to Kuwait, Iraq, Libya and Sudan
- Martin J. Ball, Honorary Professor of Linguistics, Bangor University, Wales
- J. P. V. D. Balsdon, historian
- Ollie Batson, Exeter Chiefs
- David Bellotti, Liberal Democrat politician and CEO of Brighton & Hove Albion
- John Blackall, physician
- Kevin Brooks, author of young adult fiction
- William Edward Buckley, professor of Anglo-Saxon
- Robin Bush, Time Team historian
- David Collins, inaugural Governor of the Colony of Van Diemens Land (later Tasmania)
- Paul Cosford, director for Health Protection and medical director for Public Health England
- Maurice O'Connor Drury, psychiatrist
- Beattie Edmondson, actress and comedian
- Ella Edmondson, actress/folk singer/songwriter
- General Sir Anthony Farrar-Hockley, soldier
- Major General Charles Dair Farrar-Hockley, soldier
- Ben Green (cricketer), first class cricketer
- Elizabeth Godwin, first female officer of The Life Guards
- Matthew Goode, actor
- Desmond Hamill, television journalist
- Sir Ronald Hatton, pomologist
- Matt Hopper, professional rugby union player
- Fred T. Jane, founder of Jane's Information Group
- Tom Lammonby first class cricketer
- Alex Leger, Blue Peter producer and director
- Tim Lewens historian and philosopher of biology and bioethics
- Jack MacBryan test cricketer and Olympic gold medallist (hockey)
- Stevie Morrison, Olympic Dinghy sailor. Represented GB in Beijing and London Olympics sailing a 49er dinghy, with Ben Rhodes
- George Ferris Whidborne Mortimer, English schoolmaster and divine
- Robert Newton, actor
- Charles Arthur Turner, British jurist, Chief Justice of Madras High Court
- Professor Ian Norman, King's College, London.
- Richard Parker, mutineer
- Harry Pennell, commander of the Terra Nova Expedition and of HMS Queen Mary
- Major Henry Rew, played rugby ten times for England.
- Ben Rhodes, Olympic Dinghy sailor. Represented GB in Beijing and London Olympics sailing a 49er dinghy, with Stevie Morrison
- John Graves Simcoe, first Lieutenant-Governor of Ontario and founder of Toronto
- F. Gordon A. Stone, Chemistry Professor at the University of Bristol and at Baylor University
- Harry Tincknell, Formula Three racing driver
- Sir Harry Veitch, horticulturalist, instrumental in establishing the Chelsea Flower Show
- Henry Vodden, Bishop of Hull
- Harry Weslake, automotive engineer
- Bob Wigley, Chairman Merrill Lynch, Europe, Middle East and Africa
- Ian Williams, Racing yacht helmsman/skipper. Four-time winner of the World Match Racing Tour.
- George Woodbridge, stage, screen, and television actor
