= Desmond Hamill =

British television news reporter (1936–2013)

- Born: Desmond Goodlett Hamill; 2 November 1936; Dún Laoghaire, Dublin, Ireland
- Died: 9 April 2013 (aged 76); Africa
- Occupation: Television news reporter
- Employer: ITN

Desmond Goodlett Hamill (2 November 1936 – 9 April 2013) was a British television news reporter who was chief foreign correspondent for ITN.

== Biography ==
Hamill was born on 2 November 1936 at 2 Gresham Terrace, Dun Laoghaire, Dublin, Ireland, and was raised in Egypt, where his parents were Presbyterian missionaries. He attended Exeter School in Devon, England. He served as a commissioned officer in the Devonshire Regiment of the British Army and the Kings African Rifles in Kenya for three years, then became a journalist and war reporter in many trouble spots and conflicts. Together with his sound recordist and cameraman he was kidnapped by armed men in Lebanon during the civil war in 1982 and was questioned for several hours before his release was negotiated by ITN. During the late 1980s he was often seen reporting nightly on long-running court cases from outside the Old Bailey during News at Ten.

He was the author of a novel, Bitter Orange, about families split by conflict in Northern Ireland, and a history of the British Army's involvement there.

Hamill died on 9 April 2013 in Africa.

== Award ==
Hamill was the Royal Television Society Journalist of the Year in 1987.

== Bibliography ==
- Hamill, Desmond (1980). Bitter Orange. London: Morrow. ISBN 0688037119.
- Hamill, Desmond (1985). Pig in the Middle - The Army in Northern Ireland, 1969-1984. London: Methuen London Ltd. ISBN 0413508005.
