= Dan Slater =

New Zealand sailor

Dan Slater (born 9 April 1976) is a New Zealand sailor. He is a member of Wakatere Boating Club in North Shore City. At the 2000 Summer Olympics he competed in the mixed skiff with Nathan Handley, finishing in 8th place. At the 2008 Summer Olympics, he competed in the men's finn class finishing 12th. He competed at the 2012 Summer Olympics in the Men's Finn class. He was successful in winning the third race which the commentator remarked was "one of the races of his life".

Slater was involved as a backup Strategist/Tactician for Team New Zealand during the 2003 America's Cup. In 2009 Slater competed in the Louis Vuitton Pacific Series as part of the Greek Challenge.
