= William Sargent =

American naturalist and writer

William Sargent is an American naturalist and author.

== Books ==
- Crab Wars: A Tale of Horseshoe Crabs, Ecology, and Human Health (2021)
- The House on Ipswich Marsh (2015)
- Beach Wars: 10,000 Years on a Barrier Beach (2012)
- Writing Naturally: A Memoir (2006)
- A Year in the Notch: Exploring the Natural History of the White Mountains (2001)
- Shallow Waters: A Year on Cape Cod's Pleasant Bay (1981)
