= Bora Gulari =

American sailor

Personal information
- Born: October 22, 1975 (age 50)

Sport
- Country: United States
- Sport: Sailing
- College team: University of Michigan

Bora Gulari (born October 22, 1975) is an American competitive sailor. He competed at the 2016 Summer Olympics in Rio de Janeiro, in the mixed Nacra 17.

He was US Sailor of the Year in 2009 and is a 2001 graduate of the University of Michigan's College of Engineering. He is a current resident of Detroit, Michigan.
