= Jolanta Ogar-Hill =

Polish sailor

Jolanta Ogar
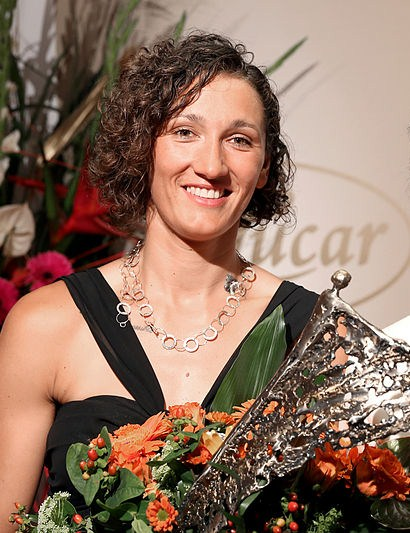
- Ogar-Hill won the Austrian Team of the Year award in 2014

Personal information
- Full name: Jolanta Ogar-Hill
- Born: 28 April 1982 (age 44) Brzesko, Poland

Sailing career
- Sport: Sailing
Medal record
Sailing
Representing Poland
Olympic Games
Silver medal – second place	2020 Tokyo	470
Representing Austria
World Championships
Gold medal – first place	2014 Santander	470
Gold medal – first place	2015 Haifa	470
Silver medal – second place	2013 La Rochelle	470

Jolanta Ogar-Hill (born 28 April 1982, in Brzesko) is a Polish competitive sailor. At the 2020 Summer Olympics, she competed in the women's 470 with team-mate Agnieszka Skrzypulec and won a silver medal. Since October 2014 she competed under the flag of Austria together with her Austrian teammate Lara Vadlau. Together they were successful at the 470 World Championships in La Rochelle in 2013 (silver medal) and in 2014 in Santander (gold medal).

In October 2014 Jolanta Ogar and Lara Vadlau were rewarded with the Austrian "Team of the Year 2014" award.

Since 2016 she has been competing again under the flag of Poland.

== Personal life ==
She came out as lesbian at the age of 21. She has taken part in the #SportAgainstHomophobia campaign launched by the Campaign Against Homophobia. In 2018, she married her partner Esperanza Hill. They have one daughter together.
