= Joeri van Dijk =

Dutch windsurfer (born 1983)

Personal information
- Full name: Joeri van Dijk-Passchier
- Nationality: Dutch
- Born: 14 July 1983 (age 43) The Hague
- Height: 1.83 m (6 ft 0 in)
- Weight: 70 kg (154 lb)

Sailing career
- Sport: Sailing
- Classes: Mistral One Design; RS:X
Competition record
Men's sailing
Representing Netherlands
Olympic Games
	2004 Athens	Mistral One Design
ISAF World Youth Championships
Gold medal – first place	2001 France	Mistral One Design
Silver medal – second place	2000 Australia	Mistral One Design
European Championships
Silver medal – second place	2005 Turkey	RS:X
- Updated on 14 February 2014

Joeri van Dijk-Passchier (born 14 July 1983 in The Hague) is a windsurfer from the Netherlands, who represented his country at the 2004 Summer Olympics in Athens. Van Dijk took the 20th place on the Men's Mistral One Design.
