= Pierre Pennec =

French sailor

Personal information
- Nationality: French
- Born: 19 April 1977 (age 47)

Sport
- Sport: Sailing

Pierre Pennec (born 19 April 1977) is a French sailor. He competed in the Tornado event at the 2000 Summer Olympics.
