= Lara Vadlau =

Austrian sailor

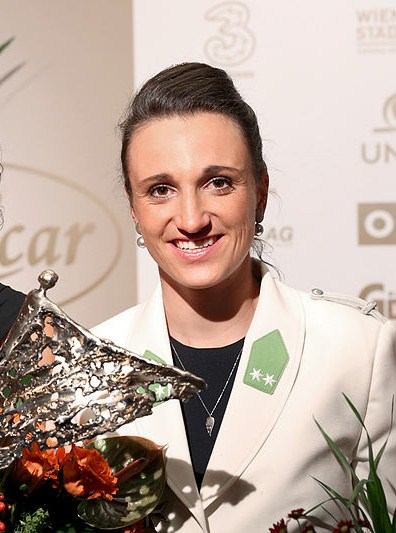
- Vadlau won the Austrian Team of the Year award in 2014

Personal information
- Born: 29 March 1994 (age 32)

Sailing career
- Sport: Sailing
Medal record
Sailing
Representing Austria
Olympic Games
Gold medal – first place	2024 Paris	470 mixed
World Championships
Gold medal – first place	2014 Santander	470
Gold medal – first place	2015 Haifa	470
Silver medal – second place	2013 La Rochelle	470

Lara Vadlau (born 29 March 1994) is an Austrian competitive sailor.

== Early life and career ==
She was born in Feldbach, Austria, on 29 March 1994. At the 2012 Summer Olympics, she competed in the women's 470 class where, alongside crewmate Eva-Maria Schimak, she finished 20th. In the 2024 Summer Olympics, Vadlau won the gold medal in the Mixed 470 event with Lukas Mähr.

== Personal life ==
Vadlau was in a relationship with German football player Lea Schüller.

In 2023, Vadlau earned her degree in medicine while continuing to compete at the highest level in sailing. She completed her medical studies during hospital rotations and Olympic training camps, often studying between sailing sessions and during breaks on hospital shifts. Reflecting on her dual pursuit, Vadlau said, “I wanted to become Olympic Sailing Champion as a doctor to prove to the world that it’s possible.”
