= Roger Hudson (sailor) =

South African sailor

Personal information
- Full name: Roger Hudson
- Nationality: South Africa
- Born: 22 March 1978 (age 48) Cape Town, South Africa
- Height: 1.77 m (5 ft 9 1/2 in)
- Weight: 75 kg (165 lb)

Sport

Sailing career
- Class: Dinghy
- Club: RaceAhead
- Coach: Dave Hudson

Roger Hudson (born 22 March 1978 in Cape Town) is a South African sailor, who specialized in two-person dinghy (470) class. He represented South Africa, along with his trainee and partner Asenathi Jim, at the 2012 Summer Olympics, and has also been training throughout most of his sporting career for RaceAhead Yacht Club, under his personal coach and father Dave Hudson, who competed in the Flying Dutchman class at the 1992 Summer Olympics in Barcelona. As of June 2015, Hudson is ranked twentieth in the world for the two-person dinghy class by the International Sailing Federation, despite his remarkable triumphs at the 2014 Delta Lloyd Regatta in Medemblik, Netherlands.

Hudson qualified for the South African squad in the men's 470 class at the 2012 Summer Olympics in London by having achieved a berth and finishing thirty-second from the World Championships in Barcelona, Spain. Teaming up with his 20-year-old partner Jim in the opening series, the South African duo were left trailing in the penultimate position out of twenty-seven boats after ten races with an accumulated net score of 194 points.
