= Weronika Glinkiewicz =

Polish sailor

Personal information
- Nationality: Polish
- Born: 15 May 1977 (age 47); Poznań, Poland

Sport
- Sport: Sailing

Weronika Glinkiewicz (born 15 May 1977) is a Polish sailor. She competed in the Europe event at the 1996 Summer Olympics.
