= Ben Rhodes (sailor) =

British yacht racer

Medal record

Sailing

Representing Great Britain

World Championships
Gold medal – first place	2007 Cascais	49er
Silver medal – second place	2008 Sorrento	49er
Bronze medal – third place	2006 Aix-les-Bains	49er

Ben Christopher Rhodes (born 10 May 1981 in Southampton) is a British sailor.

Together with teammate Stevie Morrison, Rhodes became the 2007 World champion in the 49er boat. In 2008, they won the silver medal in the same event, behind the Australians Nathan Outteridge and Ben Austin, while in 2006, they won the bronze medal.

== Education ==
Rhodes was educated at two co-educational independent schools: at St. Peter's School in the coastal village of Lympstone in Devon, followed by Exeter School, in the city of Exeter (also in Devon), in South West England.

== Life and career ==
Rhodes started sailing at age five at the Exe Sailing club in Exmouth along with Morrison. Rhodes was said to be far more interested in sailing than Steve, who preferred to watch football. They came in sixth at their first world championship in 2003, and picked up their first gold at the 2006 European Championships.

He has three superstitions: his boat has to have a name, he salutes magpies, and he does not wear a t-shirt during an event.

At the 2008 Summer Olympics, he and Morrison finished in 9th place, while at London 2012, they finished in 5th place.
