= Polly Powrie =

New Zealand sailor (born 1987)

Polly Powrie MNZM
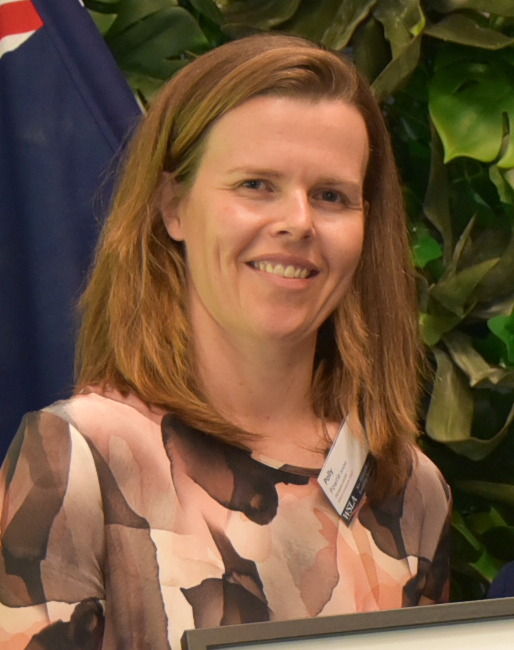
- Powrie in 2020

Personal information
- Full name: Olivia Elizabeth Powrie
- Born: 9 December 1987 (age 38) Auckland, New Zealand
- Height: 1.73 m (5 ft 8 in)
- Weight: 70 kg (154 lb)

Sailing career
- Sport: Sailing
- Club: Royal New Zealand Yacht Squadron
- Coached by: Nathan Handley
- Class(es): 420, 470
Medal record
Women's sailing
Representing New Zealand
Olympic Games
Gold medal – first place	2012 London	470 class
Silver medal – second place	2016 Rio de Janeiro	470 class
World Championships
Gold medal – first place	2007 Auckland	420 class
Gold medal – first place	2013 La Rochelle	470 class
Silver medal – second place	2010 The Hague	470 class
Silver medal – second place	2014 Santander	470 class
Silver medal – second place	2016 San Isidro	470 class
Bronze medal – third place	2011 Perth	470 class

Olivia Elizabeth "Polly" Powrie MNZM (born 9 December 1987) is a New Zealand sailor. She has won Olympic and world championship titles in the 470 class, and is also a former 420 world champion.

== Biography ==
Powrie and her sailing partner Jo Aleh, who were known as "Team Jolly", won the gold medal in the 470 class at the 2012 Summer Olympics. In August 2013, exactly a year after winning their Olympic gold medal, Aleh and Powrie won the world title at the 2013 470 World Championships in La Rochelle, France. She and Aleh were named ISAF Female Sailor of the Year, the first New Zealand women to win that award.

Powrie is a graduate of St Cuthbert's College, Auckland.

In the 2013 New Year Honours, Powrie was appointed a Member of the New Zealand Order of Merit for services to sailing.

Powrie announced her retirement from Olympic sailing on 6 January 2017.
