= Dave Hudson (sailor) =

South African sailor

Personal information
- Nationality: South African
- Born: 3 July 1946 (age 78)

Sport
- Sport: Sailing

Dave Hudson (born 3 July 1946) is a South African sailor. He competed in the Flying Dutchman event at the 1992 Summer Olympics.
