= Rutger van Schaardenburg =

Dutch sailor (born 1987)

Personal information
- Full name: Rutger van Schaardenburg
- Nationality: Dutch
- Born: 8 October 1987 (age 39) Alkmaar
- Height: 1.88 m (6.2 ft)

Sailing career
- Sport: Sailing
- Club: Rotterdamsche Zeilvereeniging
- Class: Laser
Competition record
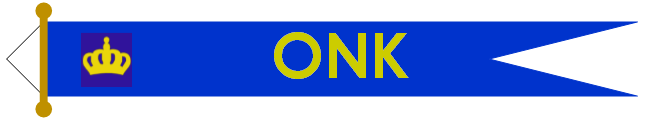
Representing Netherlands
Olympic Games
	2008 Qingdao	Laser
	2012 Weymouth	Laser
European Championships
Silver medal – second place	2013	Laser
Dutch Championships
Gold medal – first place	2013	Laser
- Updated on 13 February 2014

Rutger van Schaardenburg (born 8 October 1987, in Alkmaar) is a sailor from the Netherlands, who represented his country for the first time at the 2008 Summer Olympics in Qingdao. There he took the 34th place in the Laser class. Van Schaardenburg's second Olympic appearance was during the 2012 Olympics in Weymouth. In this competition Van Schaardenburg took 14th place. He competed again in the laser class at the 2016 Olympics, finishing in 9th place.
