= Charles McKee =

American sailor

Charlie McKee
Personal information
- Full name: Charles McKee
- Born: March 14, 1962 (age 64) Seattle, Washington, U.S.

Sailing career
- Sport: Sailing
- College team: University of Washington
- Classes: 470, 29er, 49er, Moth, ILCA 7, Melges 24, Melges 20
Medal record
Sailing
Representing United States
Olympic Games
| Bronze medal – third place | 1988 Seoul | 470 |
| Bronze medal – third place | 2000 Sydney | 49er |

Charles McKee (born March 14, 1962) is an American sailor and Olympic medalist.

He won the ICSA Match Racing National Championship in 1985 with the University of Washington.

He competed in the 470 class at the 1988 Summer Olympics in Seoul and received a bronze medal.

He competed in the 49er class at the 2000 Summer Olympics in Sydney together with his brother Jonathan McKee, and they won the bronze medal.

McKee and his brother sailed for OneWorld in the 2003 Louis Vuitton Cup and for Luna Rossa Challenge in the 2007 Louis Vuitton Cup.
