= Asenathi Jim =

South African sailor

Personal information
- Full name: Asenathi Jim
- Nickname: Squirrel
- Nationality: South Africa
- Born: 26 January 1992 (age 34) Cape Town, South Africa
- Height: 1.76 m (5 ft 9 1/2 in)
- Weight: 65 kg (143 lb)

Sport

Sailing career
- Class: Dinghy
- Club: RaceAhead
- Coach: Roger Hudson

Asenathi Jim (born 26 January 1992 in Cape Town) is a South African sailor, who specialized in two-person dinghy (470) class. He represented South Africa, along with his personal coach and partner Roger Hudson, at the 2012 Summer Olympics and the 2016 Summer Olympics, and has trained throughout most of his sporting career for RaceAhead Yacht Club.

== Career ==
Jim and Hudson first teamed up at the 2011 Delta Lloyd Regatta in Medemblik, the Netherlands.

Jim qualified for the South African squad in the men's 470 class at the 2012 Summer Olympics in London by finishing thirty-second from the World Championships in Barcelona, Spain. Teaming up with his personal coach and partner Hudson in the opening series, the South African duo were finished in the penultimate position out of twenty-seven boats after ten races with an accumulated net score of 194 points. They were the only South African entry in any of the sailing events at the 2012 Olympics.

At the 2016 Olympics, Jim and Hudson finished in 20th position. They also won the inaugural African 470 Sailing Championships.

In 2018, Jim was one of the coaches for the South African junior team for the Youth World Sailing Championships.
