= Jo Aleh =

New Zealand sailor (born 1986)

Jo Aleh MNZM
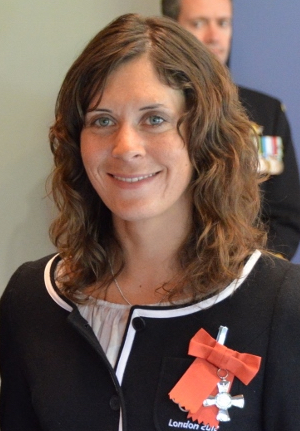
- Aleh in 2015

Personal information
- Full name: Joanna Ayela Aleh
- Nicknames: Kesem Shukrun; Jox
- Nationality: New Zealand
- Born: 15 May 1986 (age 40) Auckland, New Zealand
- Height: 5 ft 7 in (170 cm)
- Weight: 127 lb (58 kg)

Sailing career
- Sport: Sailing
- Club: RNZYS, Takapuna Boating Club, Auckland, New Zealand
- Coached by: Nathan Handley
- Class: 470
Medal record
Women's Sailing
Representing New Zealand
Olympic Games
Gold medal – first place	2012 London	470 class
Silver medal – second place	2016 Rio de Janeiro	470 class
World Championships
Gold medal – first place	2007 Auckland	420 class
Gold medal – first place	2013 La Rochelle	470 class
Silver medal – second place	2010 The Hague	470 class
Silver medal – second place	2014 Santander	470 class
Silver medal – second place	2016 San Isidro	470 class
Bronze medal – third place	2011 Perth	470 class

Joanna Ayela Aleh MNZM (born 15 May 1986) is a New Zealand sailor. She is a national champion, a former world champion, and an Olympic gold medallist.

== Early and personal life ==
Aleh is Jewish, and was born in Auckland, daughter of Israeli father Shuki Shukrun and British-born mother Daniella Aleh, a former Israeli soldier. She lives in Auckland where she began a degree in Mechanical Engineering at University of Auckland. When her sailing commitments increased, she moved to AUT to continue her engineering degree, and later began studying a Bachelor of Information Science at Massey University extramurally. Her Israeli name is Kesem Shukrun, and she had a Bat Mitzvah in Be'er Sheva. She is a member of Beth Shalom, a Progressive Jewish congregation in Auckland.

In the 2013 New Year Honours, Aleh was appointed a Member of the New Zealand Order of Merit for services to sailing.

== Sailing career ==
Just before her ninth birthday, Aleh was impressed by the New Zealand victory in the 1995 America's Cup, and asked her father if she could learn to sail. She did a learn to sail course at the Ponsonby Cruising Club and with the help of her extended family a small sailing dinghy was purchased. She began her competitive career at the age of 11 in an Optimist. Her first competition event was the Auckland Anniversary Regatta, for Kohimarama YC, in 1998.

She then made sailing history as the first female to win the Tanner Cup since its inception in 1945. This highly contested interprovincial competition is sailed in P-class sailing dinghies.

She won the Auckland Optimist Girls' Championship in 2000, in Kohimarama YC. Her first international competition was the 2002 Cork Regatta, in Kingston, Canada, in the Byte Class, where she won both the Youth and Open divisions, then moved onto the youth classes (under 18) and competed at two ISAF Youth World Championships, finishing with a silver medal in her final year.

Aleh then began the road to Beijing, competing in the Laser Radial class (women's single handed class) with a string of successful results including a World Cup event win, and a silver medal at the Pre-Olympic Test Event in Qingdao, China.

In 2007, she won the 420 World Championships at Takapuna, sailing with Olivia "Polly" Powrie.

She then competed at the 2008 Summer Olympics in Women's one-person dinghy, coming seventh.

Aleh and her sailing partner Olivia Polly Powrie won a silver medal in the 2010 470 World Championships in The Hague, Netherlands, and a bronze medal in the 470 World Championships in the 2011 ISAF Sailing World Championships in Perth, Australia. She and Powrie finished fourth at the Barcelona World Championships in May 2012, won the women's 470 class in the World Cup in Weymouth, England, in June 2012, and are the current New Zealand 470 national champions.

In August 2012 she and Powrie won the gold medal in the 470 class at the Olympic Games in Weymouth and Portland, England.

In August 2013, a year after winning their Olympic gold medal, Aleh and Powrie won the world title at the 2013 470 World Championships in La Rochelle, France.

Aleh twice achieved world Number 1, in the Women's Laser Radial on 5 March 2008, and the Women's 470 in 2013. Her coach since 2009 has been Nathan Handley.

She is a life member of the Kohimarama Yacht Club, Takapuna Boating Club and Yachting New Zealand, and is a current member of the Royal New Zealand Yacht Squadron.

Aleh trialled with Team Brunel before the 2017–18 Volvo Ocean Race but was not selected and instead joined consultancy firm Ernst & Young.

On 26 July 2024 Aleh was announced as a flag bearer for the New Zealand team at the 2024 Summer Olympics, along with Aaron Gate.

== See also ==
- List of select Jews in sailing

Olympic Games
Preceded by Sarah Hirini & David Nyika	Flagbearer for New Zealand; Paris 2024; With: Aaron Gate	Incumbent
