= Tornado World Championship =

The Tornado World Championship are international sailing regattas in the Tornado class organized by the host club on behalf of the International Tornado Class Association and recognised by World Sailing. The Tornado was an Olympic class from 1976 to 2008.

== History ==
The first Tornado World Championship were held in Kiel in 1968.

== Editions ==
Event			Host			Sailor			Boats					Ref.
Ed.	Date	Year	Host club	City	Country	No.	Nat.	Cont.	No.			M/F	F/M	Ref.
1	-	1968		Kiel	Germany	28	4		14					
2	-	1969		Melbourne	Australia	46	3		23					
3	-	1970		Eau Gallie	United States	70	6		35					
4	-	1971		Weymouth	United Kingdom	102	9		51					
5	-	1972		Travemünde	Germany	120	11		60					
6	-	1973		Toronto	Canada	120	9		60					
7	-	1974		Honolulu	United States	94	9		47					
8	-	1975		Copenhagen	Denmark	128	15		64					
9	-	1976		Sydney	Australia	104	10		52					
10	-	1977		Long Beach	United States	126	13		63					
11	-	1978		Weymouth	United Kingdom	156	20		78					
12	-	1979		Kiel	Germany	208	21		104					
13	-	1980		Auckland	New Zealand		11		67					
14	-	1981		Carnac	France		14		50					
15	-	1982		Kingston	Canada		12		64					
16	-	1983	Hayling Island Sailing Club	Hayling Island	United Kingdom		14		65					
17	-	1984		Melbourne	Australia		13		63					
18	-	1985		Travemünde	Germany		15		80					
19	13-20 Apr	1986		Hamilton	Bermuda		13		84					
20	26Jun -5Jul	1987		Kiel	Germany		22		86					
21	19-26 Jul	1988		Tallinn	Estonia	60	11		30					
22	-	1989		Houston	United States	160	16		80					
23	19-25 Aug	1990		Medemblik	Netherlands	168	23		84					
24	12-22 Sep	1991	Windsurfing Club Cagliari	Cagliari	Italy	174	18		85					
25	12-19 Jan	1992		Perth	Australia	120	15		60					
26	20-25 Sep	1993	Alamitos Bay Yacht Club	Long Beach	United States	116	16		58					
27	8-14 Aug	1994		Bastad	Sweden	153	23	3	77					
28	11-18 Aug	1995		Kingston	Canada				64					
29	8-13 Jan	1996		Mooloolaba	Australia	136	15	3	68					
30	7-14 Nov	1997		Hamilton	Bermuda				62					
31	20-27 Nov	1998		Armação dos Búzios	Brazil	154	22	5	77					
32	2-9 Jul	1999		Vallensbæk	Denmark	156	24	5	78					
33	8-15 Jan	2000		Sydney	Australia	146	25	5	74					
34	10-17 Feb	2001	Zululand Yacht Club	Richards Bay	South Africa	60	8	3	30					
35	21-28 Sep	2002		Martha's Vineyard	United States	114	20	5	57					
36	11-24 Sep	2003		Cádiz	Spain	144	27	5	72					
37	10-18 Apr	2004	Club Nàutic S'Arenal	Palma de Mallorca	Spain	124	24	4	62					
38	12-19 Jun	2005		La Rochelle	France	124	22	4	62					
39	1-10 Dec	2006	Club Náutico San Isidro	San Isidro	Argentina	94	20	5	47					
40	28Jun -13Jul	2007	Clube Naval de Cascais	Cascais	Portugal	98	21	5	49					
41	25Feb -1Mar	2008	Takapuna Boating Club	Takapuna	New Zealand	102	22	5	51					
42	27Aug -4Sep	2009	Circolo Vela Gargnano	Gargnano	Italy	78	12	3	39					
43	23Jul -1Aug	2010		Travemünde	Germany	100	8	2	50					
44	20-28 Aug	2011		Biel		64	10	3	32					
45	18-22 Sep	2012	Circolo Vela Torbole	Nago–Torbole	Italy	80	11	2	40	33	0	6	1	
46	28Sep -5Oct	2013	Club Nautico Santa Eularia	Ibiza	Spain	60	11	3	30	21	0	7	2	
47	30Dec -3Jan	2014/15	Nedlands Yacht Club	Nedlands	Australia	60	8	3	30	26	0	3	1	
48	5-12 Sep	2015	Yacht Club de Carnac	Carnac	France	48	6	2	24	19	0	5	0	
49	10-17 Jun	2016	Lindauer Segles Club	Lindau	Germany	58	11	2	29	19	1	7	2	
50	28Aug -5Sep	2017	Nautical Club of Thessaloniki	Kalamaria	Greece	46	10	2	23	13	0	8	2	
51	7-14 Jul	2018	Yacht Club de La Grande-Motte	La Grande-Motte	France	48	9	2	24	18	0	5	1	
52	4-10 Jan	2019	Takapuna Boating Club	Takapuna	New Zealand	46	7	2	23	14	0	5	4	
N/A	-	2020			Greece	cancelled due to COVID								
53	26Sep -3Oct	2021	Nautical Club of Thessaloniki	Kalamaria	Greece	34	5	1	17	7	0	6	4	
54	27Aug -3Sep	2022	Yacht Club de La Grande-Motte	La Grande-Motte	France	48	10	2	24	16	0	6	2	
55	18-25 Aug	2023	Centro Vela Dervio ASD	Dervio	Italy	60	11	2	30	21	0	7	2	
56	12-19 Jul	2024	Club Nautico Rimini	Rimini	Italy	58	10	2	29	23	1	3	2	
57	19-25 Jul	2025	Nautical Club of Kalamaria	Kalamaria	Greece	38	8	2	19	14	0	2	3	

== Multiple medalists ==
Updated upto and including 2025

Ranking	Sailor	Gold	Silver	Bronze	Total	No. Entries
1	Konstantinos Trigonis (GRE)	8	1	1	10	17
2	Iordanis Paschalidis (GRE)	7	1	1	9	15
3	Darren Bundock (AUS)	7	0	2	9	15
4	John Forbes (AUS)	6	2	3	11	13
5	Roland Gaebler (GER)	4	5	2	11	22
6	Rene Schwall (GER)	3	2	2	7	9
7	Glenn Ashby (AUS)	3	0	0	3	7
8	Roman Hagara (AUT)	2	2	2	6	16
9	Randy Smyth (USA)	2	2	0	4	5
9	Jay Glaser (USA)	2	2	0	4	6
9	Reg White (GBR)	2	2	0	4	4
12	Mitch Booth (AUS)	2	1	2	5	8
13	Chris Cairns (AUS)	2	1	0	3	3
15	Anton Paz Blanco (ESP)	2	0	0	2	8
15	Aleksandar Zybin (URS)	2	0	0	2	2
15	Fernando Echavarri Era (ESP)	2	0	0	2	8
15	H. Polaschegg (AUT)	2	0	0	2	2
15	Jeremy Newman (GBR)	2	0	0	2	2
14	Jörg Spengler (FRG)	2	0	1	3	3
15	Konstantinos Kazantzis (GRE)	2	0	0	2	3
15	Robert Jessenigg (AUT)	2	0	0	2	2
15	Robert White (GBR)	2	0	0	2	2
15	Scott Anderson (AUS)	2	0	0	2	2
15	Viktor Potapov (URS)	2	0	0	2	2

== Medalists ==
=== Open ===
Year	Gold	Silver	Bronze
1968 Kiel	Great Britain; Ian Tremlett; Bill Tremlett		
1969 Melbourne	Australia; Maurice Davies; Ian Ramsay	Australia; Jim Dachtler	
1970 Eau Galle, Florida	United States; Paul Lindenberg; Jack Sammons		
1971 Weymouth	Great Britain; Ian Fraser; Tim Coventry		
1972 Travemünde	Austria; Robert Jessenig; Hans Polaschegg	United States; John Weiser	Great Britain; Ian Fraser
1973 Toronto	United States; Bruce Stewart; Bruce Harvey	United States; John Weiser; Cappy Sheeley	United States; Roy Seaman
1974 Honolulu	Austria; Robert Jessenig; Hans Polaschegg	United States; R Paul Allen; Woody Cox	United States; David McFaull; Michael Rothwell
1975 Copenhagen	West Germany; Jörg Spengler; Jörg Schmall	Great Britain; Reginald White; John Osborn	United States; Bruce Badeau; Douglas Cummings
1976 Sydney	Great Britain; Reginald White; John Osborn	Australia; Brian Lewis; Warren Rock	Australia; Jim Dachtler
1977 Long Beach	West Germany; Jörg Spengler; Rolf Dullenkopf	Australia; Brian Lewis; Warren Rock	United States; Keith Notari; Dave Gamblin
1978 Weymouth	Soviet Union; Viktor Potapov; Aleksander Sybin	Great Britain; Reginald White; Stephen Olle	Australia; Brian Lewis; Warren Rock
1979 Kiel	Great Britain; Reginald White; Stephen Olle	Denmark; Peter Due; Per Kjaergaard	West Germany; Tobias Neuhann; Herbert Plenk
1980 Auckland	Soviet Union; Viktor Potapov; Aleksander Sybin	Austria; Hans Prack; Gottlieb Peer	West Germany; Jörg Spengler; Jörg Schmall
1981 Carnac	United States; Randy Smyth; Jay Glaser	Soviet Union; Jakov Kliver; Sergey Fogilev	France; Yves Loday; Christian Buet
1982 Kingston	United States; Randy Smyth; Jay Glaser		
1983 Hayling Island	Australia; Christopher Cairns; Scott Anderson	Netherlands; Willy van Bladel; Huub Lambriex	France; Yves Loday; Franck Aussedat
1984 Melbourne	Australia; Christopher Cairns; Scott Anderson	United States; Randy Smyth; Jay Glaser	Netherlands; Willy van Bladel; Huub Lambriex
1985 Travemünde	Great Britain; Robert White; Jeremy Newman	United States; Randy Smyth; Jay Glaser	Denmark; Paul Elvstrøm; Trine Elvstrøm
1986 Hamilton	Great Britain; Robert White; Jeremy Newman	West Germany; Stephan Lange; Michael Starken	Great Britain; Greg White; Daniel Campbell-Jones
1987 Kiel	Austria; Andreas Hagara; Roman Hagara	Australia; Christ Cairns; John Forbes	Italy; Giorgio Zuccoli; Luca Santella
1988 Tallinn	Soviet Union; Yuri Konovalov (sailor); Sergey Kravtsov	France; Jean-Yves Le Déroff; Nicolas Hénard	Italy; Giorgio Zuccoli; Luca Santella
1989 Houston	Australia; Mitch Booth; John Forbes	Italy; Giorgio Zuccoli; Angelo Glisoni	Australia; Allan Goddell; Greg Cann
1990 Medemblik	France; Christophe Clevenot; Maurice Eisenblatter	Australia; Brad Schafferius; Lachlan Gilbert	Austria; Andreas Hagara; Roman Hagara
1991 Cagliari	Italy; Giorgio Zuccoli; Angelo Glisoni	Italy; Walter Pirinoli; Marco Pirinoli	Germany; Oliver Schwall; René Schwall
1992 Perth	Australia; Mitch Booth; John Forbes	Germany; Oliver Schwall; René Schwall	France; Frédéric le Peutrec; Richard de Mec
1993 Long Beach	Germany; Oliver Schwall; René Schwall	Australia; Mitch Booth; John Forbes	France; Christophe Clevenot; Yvon Quernec
1994 Båstad	Spain; Fernando León; José Luis Ballester	Germany; Helge Sach; Jens-Christian Sach	Australia; Mitch Booth; John Forbes
1995 Kingston	Italy; Walter Pirinoli; Marco Pirinoli	France; Jean-Christofer Mourniac; Philippe Mourniac	Spain; Fernando León; José Luis Ballester
1996 Brisbane	Germany; Roland Gäbler; Frank Parlow	Spain; Fernando León; José Luis Ballester	Australia; Darren Bundock; John Forbes
1997 Hamilton	Germany; Roland Gäbler; René Schwall	Spain; Fernando León; José Luis Ballester	Australia; Mitch Booth; Andrew Beashel
1998 Buzios	Australia; Darren Bundock; John Forbes	Germany; Roland Gäbler; René Schwall	Spain; Fernando León; José Luis Ballester
1999 Vallensbæk	Austria; Roman Hagara; Hans-Peter Steinacher	Austria; Andreas Hagara; Wolfgang Moser	Germany; Roland Gäbler; René Schwall
2000 Sydney	Germany; Roland Gäbler; René Schwall	Austria; Roman Hagara; Hans-Peter Steinacher	France; Jean-Christofer Mourniac; Philippe Mourniac
2001 Richards Bay	Australia; Darren Bundock; John Forbes	Austria; Roman Hagara; Hans-Peter Steinacher	Great Britain; Hugh Styles; Adam May
2002 Edgartown	Australia; Darren Bundock; John Forbes	France; Olivier Backes; Laurent Voiron	Netherlands; Mitch Booth; Herbert Dercksen
2003 Cádiz	Australia; Darren Bundock; John Forbes	Great Britain; Leigh McMillan; Mark Bulkeley	Argentina; Santiago Lange; Carlos Espínola
2004 Palma de Mallorca	Argentina; Santiago Lange; Carlos Espínola	United States; John Lovell; Charlie Ogletree	Australia; Darren Bundock; John Forbes
2005 La Rochelle	Spain; Fernando Echávarri; Antón Paz	Great Britain; Leigh McMillan; Will Howden	France; Xavier Revil; Christophe Espagnon
2006 San Isidro	Australia; Darren Bundock; Glenn Ashby	Argentina; Santiago Lange; Carlos Espínola	Austria; Roman Hagara; Hans-Peter Steinacher
2007 Cascais	Spain; Fernando Echávarri; Antón Paz	Belgium; Carolijn Brouwer; Sébastien Godefroid	Netherlands; Mitch Booth; Pim Nieuwenhuis
2008 North Shore City	Australia; Darren Bundock; Glenn Ashby	Canada; Oskar Johansson; Kevin Stittle	France; Yann Guichard; Alexandre Guyader
2009 Bogliaco	Australia; Darren Bundock; Glenn Ashby	Austria; Thomas Zajac; Thomas Czajka	Greece; Iordanis Paschalidis; Konstantinos Trigkonis
2010 Travemünde	Germany; Roland Gäbler; Nahid Gäbler	Greece; Iordanis Paschalidis; Konstantinos Trigkonis	Germany; Helge Sach; Christian Sach
2011 Biel	Greece; Iordanis Paschalidis; Konstantinos Trigkonis	Germany; Roland Gäbler; Nahid Gäbler	Australia; Brett Burvill; Ryan Duffield
2012 Torbole	Greece; Iordanis Paschalidis; Konstantinos Trigkonis	Germany; Roland Gäbler; Nahid Gäbler	Italy; Matteo Ferraglia; Lorenzo Bianchini
2013 Ibiza	Greece; Iordanis Paschalidis; Konstantinos Trigkonis	Germany; Roland Gäbler; Nahid Gäbler	Australia; Brett Burvill; Faris Chase
2014 Nedlands	Greece; Iordanis Paschalidis; Konstantinos Trigkonis	Australia; Brett Burvill; Ryan Duffield	Germany; Roland Gäbler; Nahid Gäbler
2015 Carnac	Greece; Iordanis Paschalidis; Konstantinos Trigkonis	Germany; Roland Gäbler; Nahid Gäbler	Greece; Mavros Nikolaos; Tagaropoulos Alexandros
2016 Lindau	Iordanis Paschalidis (GRE); Konstantinos Trigonis (GRE)	Australia; Gavin Colby; Billy Leonard	Estela Jentsch (GER); Daniel Brown (GER)
2017; Thessaloniki (GRE); 23 Boats	Iordanis Paschalidis (GRE); Konstantinos Trigonis (GRE)		
2018; La Grande Motte (FRA); 24 Boats	Iordanis Paschalidis (GRE); Konstantinos Trigonis (GRE)	Brett Burvill (AUS); Max Puttman (AUS)	Estela Jentsch (GER); Daniel Brown (GER)
2019; Takapuna (NZL); 23 Boats	Brett Burvill (AUS); Max Puttman (AUS)	Jorg Steiner (SUI); Michael Gloor (SUI)	Estela Jentsch (GER); Daniel Brown (GER)
2021; Thessaloniki (GRE); 17 Boats	Konstantinos Trigonis (GRE); Konstantinos Kazantzis (GRE)	Michaela Pavlisova (CZE); Marek Pavlis (CZE)	Nikolaos Mavros (GRE); Periklis Aidinidis (GRE)
2022; La Grande Motte (FRA); 24 Boats	Konstantinos Trigonis (GRE); Konstantinos Kazantzis (GRE)	Yoann Trécul (FRA); Thomas Ferrand (FRA)	Brett Burvill (AUS); Kirsikka Raisainen (FIN)
2023; Dervio (ITA); 30 Boats	Yoann Trécul (FRA); Thomas Ferrand (FRA)	Angelika Kohlendorfer (AUT); Calvin Claus (AUT)	Marcel Steiner (SUI); Jörg Steiner (SUI)
2024; Rimini (ITA); 29 Boats	Angelika Kohlendorfer (AUT); Calvin Claus (AUT)	Marcel Steiner (SUI); Ben Steiner (SUI)	Yoann Trécul (FRA); Thomas Ferrand (FRA)
2025	Nikolaos Mavros (GRE); Polydoros Parianos (GRE)	Michaela Pavlisova (CZE); Marek Pavlis (CZE)	Estela Luna Jentsch Steimer (GRE); Avraam Koen Levi (GRE)

=== Mixed ===
Year	Gold	Silver	Bronze
2010 Travemünde	Germany; Roland Gäbler; Nahid Gäbler	Germany; Kiki Loweg; Florian Loweg	Germany; Andreas Behem; Katharina Behem
2011 Biel	Germany; Roland Gäbler; Nahid Gäbler	Austria; Nicole Salzmann; Dietmar Salzmann	Switzerland; Martin Rusterholz; Julia Rusterholz
2012 Torbole	Germany; Roland Gäbler; Nahid Gäbler	Germany; Dieter Maurer; Maren Odefey	Spain; Jürgen Jentsch; Sarah Steimer Klees
2013 Ibiza	Germany; Roland Gäbler; Nahid Gäbler	Switzerland; Jean-Marc Cuanillion; Gudrun Kolb	Greece; Maria Tsausidou; Michael Papadopolus
2014 Nedlands	Germany; Roland Gäbler; Nahid Gäbler	Spain; Jürgen Jentsch; Sarah Steimer Klees	Greece; Maria Tsausidou; Marc Baier
2015 Carnac	Germany; Roland Gäbler; Nahid Gäbler	Switzerland; Jean-Marc Cuanillion; Gudrun Kolb	Czech Republic; Zdeněk Pavlis; Michaela Pavlisova
2016 Lindau	Australia; Brett Burvill; Estela Jentsch	Greece; Maria Tsausidou; Michael Papadopolus	Czech Republic; Zdeněk Pavlis; Michaela Pavlisova
2017 Thessaloniki	Czech Republic; Zdeněk Pavlis; Michaela Pavlisova	Germany; Jürgen Jentsch; Sarah Jentsch	Czech Republic; Markus Betz; Monika Schuster

== See also ==
- Sailing World Championships
- World Sailing
