= Tornado (sailboat) =

Double handed multihull class

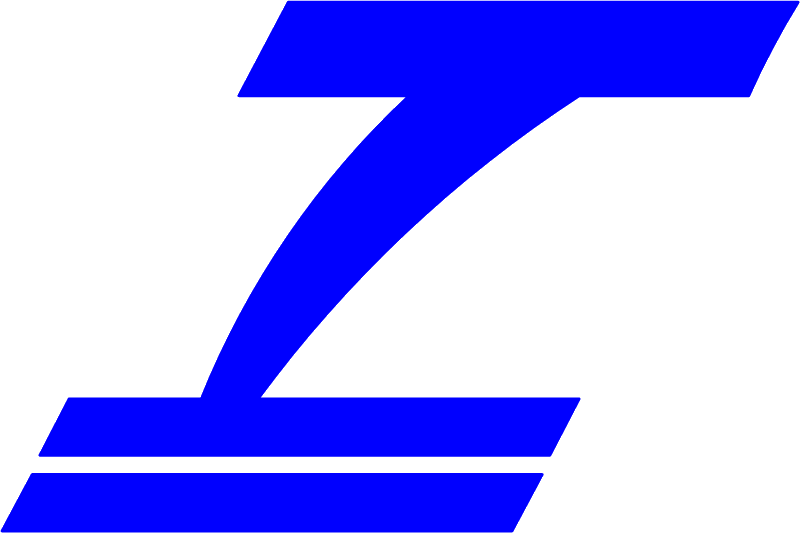

Boat
- Crew: 2 (twin trapeze, since 2000)
- Draft: 0.15 m (6 in); 0.76 m (2 ft 6 in)

Hull
- Hull weight: 155 kg (342 lb) (boat weight); 6.3 kg (14 lb) (mast tip weight)
- LOA: 6.09 m (20.0 ft)
- LWL: 5.84 m (19 ft 2 in)
- Beam: 3.08 m (10 ft 1 in)

Rig
- Mast height: 9.08 m (29 ft 9 in)

Sails
- Mainsail area: 16.61 m^{2} (178.8 sq ft)
- Jib/genoa area: 5.33 m^{2} (57.4 sq ft)
- Spinnaker area: 25.00 m^{2} (269.1 sq ft)

Rating
- D-PN: 59.0
- RYA PN: 644

The Tornado is a double handed multihull class recognised as an International Class by World Sailing. It was used for the Catamaran discipline at the Olympic Games from 1976 to 2008.

== Design ==
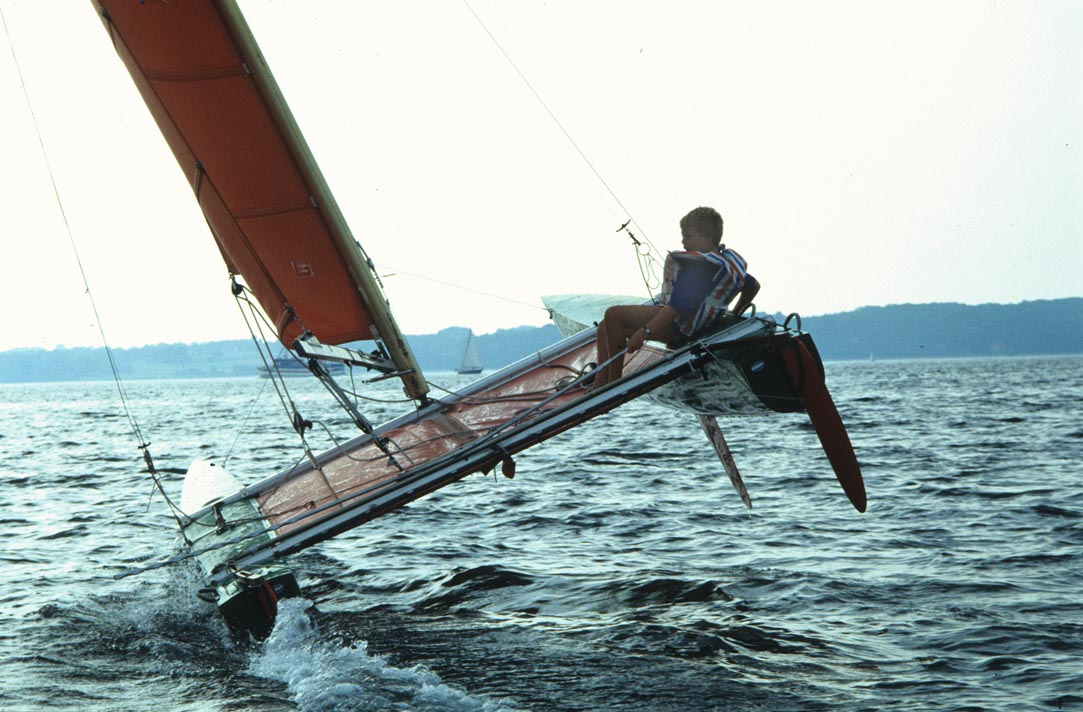
One hull flying

The boat was designed in 1967 by Rodney March from the Isle of Sheppey, England. At the IYRU Olympic Catamaran Trials for international status, where it defeated other catamarans.

To increase its performance even further, the Tornado was modified in 2001, with a new sail plan which included a spinnaker and spinnaker boom, as well as an increased sail area of the existing sails. An additional trapeze was also added, and the jib was made self tacking.

The Tornado is among the fastest double handed catamarans, with an ISAF Small Catamaran Handicap Rating System rating of 0.934 and a D-PN of 59.0. It is the fastest catamaran in the RYA Portsmouth Yardstick scheme, with a 2015 Portsmouth Number of 634.

== Events ==
=== Olympics ===
The Tornado was used as the equipment for the multihull discipline in the Olympic Games from 1976 through 2008, when multihulls were deselected. Please see the individual years for results Olympic Sailing Regatta

Games	Gold	Silver	Bronze
1976 Montreal	Great Britain (GBR); Reginald White; John Osborn	United States (USA); David McFaull; Michael Rothwell	West Germany (FRG); Jörg Spengler; Jörg Schmall
1980 Moscow	Brazil (BRA); Lars Sigurd Björkström; Alexandre Welter	Denmark (DEN); Peter Due; Per Kjergard	Sweden (SWE); Göran Marström; Jörgen Ragnarsson
1984 Los Angeles	New Zealand (NZL); Rex Sellers; Chris Timms	United States (USA); Randy Smyth; Jay Glaser	Australia (AUS); Christopher Cairns; John Anderson
1988 Seoul	France (FRA); Jean Le Deroff; Nicolas Hénard	New Zealand (NZL); Chris Timms; Rex Sellers	Brazil (BRA); Lars Grael; Clinio Freitas
1992 Barcelona	France (FRA); Yves Loday; Nicolas Hénard	United States (USA); Randy Smyth; Keith Notary	Australia (AUS); Mitch Booth; John Forbes
1996 Atlanta	Spain (ESP); Fernando León; José Luis Ballester	Australia (AUS); Mitch Booth; Andrew Landenberger	Brazil (BRA); Lars Grael; Henrique Pellicano
2000 Sydney	Austria (AUT); Roman Hagara; Hans-Peter Steinacher	Australia (AUS); Darren Bundock; John Forbes	Germany (GER); Roland Gäbler; René Schwall
2004 Athens	Austria (AUT); Roman Hagara; Hans Peter Steinacher	United States (USA); John Lovell; Charlie Ogletree	Argentina (ARG); Santiago Lange; Carlos Espínola
2008 Beijing	Spain (ESP); Antón Paz; Fernando Echávarri	Australia (AUS); Darren Bundock; Glenn Ashby	Argentina (ARG); Santiago Lange; Carlos Espínola

=== World Championships ===
==== Open ====
Year	Gold	Silver	Bronze
1968 Kiel	Great Britain; Ian Tremlett; Bill Tremlett		
1969 Melbourne	Australia; Maurice Davies; Ian Ramsay	Australia; Jim Dachtler	
1970 Eau Galle, Florida	United States; Paul Lindenberg; Jack Sammons		
1971 Weymouth	Great Britain; Ian Fraser; Tim Coventry		
1972 Travemünde	Austria; Robert Jessenig; Hans Polaschegg	United States; John Weiser	Great Britain; Ian Fraser
1973 Toronto	United States; Bruce Stewart; Bruce Harvey	United States; John Weiser; Cappy Sheeley	United States; Roy Seaman
1974 Honolulu	Austria; Robert Jessenig; Hans Polaschegg	United States; R Paul Allen; Woody Cox	United States; David McFaull; Michael Rothwell
1975 Copenhagen	West Germany; Jörg Spengler; Jörg Schmall	Great Britain; Reginald White; John Osborn	United States; Bruce Badeau; Douglas Cummings
1976 Sydney	Great Britain; Reginald White; John Osborn	Australia; Brian Lewis; Warren Rock	Australia; Jim Dachtler
1977 Long Beach	West Germany; Jörg Spengler; Rolf Dullenkopf	Australia; Brian Lewis; Warren Rock	United States; Keith Notari; Dave Gamblin
1978 Weymouth	Soviet Union; Viktor Potapov; Aleksander Sybin	Great Britain; Reginald White; Stephen Olle	Australia; Brian Lewis; Warren Rock
1979 Kiel	Great Britain; Reginald White; Stephen Olle	Denmark; Peter Due; Per Kjaergaard	West Germany; Tobias Neuhann; Herbert Plenk
1980 Auckland	Soviet Union; Viktor Potapov; Aleksander Sybin	Austria; Hans Prack; Gottlieb Peer	West Germany; Jörg Spengler; Jörg Schmall
1981 Carnac	United States; Randy Smyth; Jay Glaser	Soviet Union; Jakov Kliver; Sergey Fogilev	France; Yves Loday; Christian Buet
1982 Kingston	United States; Randy Smyth; Jay Glaser		
1983 Hayling Island	Australia; Christopher Cairns; Scott Anderson	Netherlands; Willy van Bladel; Huub Lambriex	France; Yves Loday; Franck Aussedat
1984 Melbourne	Australia; Christopher Cairns; Scott Anderson	United States; Randy Smyth; Jay Glaser	Netherlands; Willy van Bladel; Huub Lambriex
1985 Travemünde	Great Britain; Robert White; Jeremy Newman	United States; Randy Smyth; Jay Glaser	Denmark; Paul Elvstrøm; Trine Elvstrøm
1986 Hamilton	Great Britain; Robert White; Jeremy Newman	West Germany; Stephan Lange; Michael Starken	Great Britain; Greg White; Daniel Campbell-Jones
1987 Kiel	Austria; Andreas Hagara; Roman Hagara	Australia; Christ Cairns; John Forbes	Italy; Giorgio Zuccoli; Luca Santella
1988 Tallinn	Soviet Union; Yuri Konovalov (sailor); Sergey Kravtsov	France; Jean-Yves Le Déroff; Nicolas Hénard	Italy; Giorgio Zuccoli; Luca Santella
1989 Houston	Australia; Mitch Booth; John Forbes	Italy; Giorgio Zuccoli; Angelo Glisoni	Australia; Allan Goddell; Greg Cann
1990 Medemblik	France; Christophe Clevenot; Maurice Eisenblatter	Australia; Brad Schafferius; Lachlan Gilbert	Austria; Andreas Hagara; Roman Hagara
1991 Cagliari	Italy; Giorgio Zuccoli; Angelo Glisoni	Italy; Walter Pirinoli; Marco Pirinoli	Germany; Oliver Schwall; René Schwall
1992 Perth	Australia; Mitch Booth; John Forbes	Germany; Oliver Schwall; René Schwall	France; Frédéric le Peutrec; Richard de Mec
1993 Long Beach	Germany; Oliver Schwall; René Schwall	Australia; Mitch Booth; John Forbes	France; Christophe Clevenot; Yvon Quernec
1994 Båstad	Spain; Fernando León; José Luis Ballester	Germany; Helge Sach; Jens-Christian Sach	Australia; Mitch Booth; John Forbes
1995 Kingston	Italy; Walter Pirinoli; Marco Pirinoli	France; Jean-Christofer Mourniac; Philippe Mourniac	Spain; Fernando León; José Luis Ballester
1996 Brisbane	Germany; Roland Gäbler; Frank Parlow	Spain; Fernando León; José Luis Ballester	Australia; Darren Bundock; John Forbes
1997 Hamilton	Germany; Roland Gäbler; René Schwall	Spain; Fernando León; José Luis Ballester	Australia; Mitch Booth; Andrew Beashel
1998 Buzios	Australia; Darren Bundock; John Forbes	Germany; Roland Gäbler; René Schwall	Spain; Fernando León; José Luis Ballester
1999 Vallensbæk	Austria; Roman Hagara; Hans-Peter Steinacher	Austria; Andreas Hagara; Wolfgang Moser	Germany; Roland Gäbler; René Schwall
2000 Sydney	Germany; Roland Gäbler; René Schwall	Austria; Roman Hagara; Hans-Peter Steinacher	France; Jean-Christofer Mourniac; Philippe Mourniac
2001 Richards Bay	Australia; Darren Bundock; John Forbes	Austria; Roman Hagara; Hans-Peter Steinacher	Great Britain; Hugh Styles; Adam May
2002 Edgartown	Australia; Darren Bundock; John Forbes	France; Olivier Backes; Laurent Voiron	Netherlands; Mitch Booth; Herbert Dercksen
2003 Cádiz	Australia; Darren Bundock; John Forbes	Great Britain; Leigh McMillan; Mark Bulkeley	Argentina; Santiago Lange; Carlos Espínola
2004 Palma de Mallorca	Argentina; Santiago Lange; Carlos Espínola	United States; John Lovell; Charlie Ogletree	Australia; Darren Bundock; John Forbes
2005 La Rochelle	Spain; Fernando Echávarri; Antón Paz	Great Britain; Leigh McMillan; Will Howden	France; Xavier Revil; Christophe Espagnon
2006 San Isidro	Australia; Darren Bundock; Glenn Ashby	Argentina; Santiago Lange; Carlos Espínola	Austria; Roman Hagara; Hans-Peter Steinacher
2007 Cascais	Spain; Fernando Echávarri; Antón Paz	Belgium; Carolijn Brouwer; Sébastien Godefroid	Netherlands; Mitch Booth; Pim Nieuwenhuis
2008 North Shore City	Australia; Darren Bundock; Glenn Ashby	Canada; Oskar Johansson; Kevin Stittle	France; Yann Guichard; Alexandre Guyader
2009 Bogliaco	Australia; Darren Bundock; Glenn Ashby	Austria; Thomas Zajac; Thomas Czajka	Greece; Iordanis Paschalidis; Konstantinos Trigkonis
2010 Travemünde	Germany; Roland Gäbler; Nahid Gäbler	Greece; Iordanis Paschalidis; Konstantinos Trigkonis	Germany; Helge Sach; Christian Sach
2011 Biel	Greece; Iordanis Paschalidis; Konstantinos Trigkonis	Germany; Roland Gäbler; Nahid Gäbler	Australia; Brett Burvill; Ryan Duffield
2012 Torbole	Greece; Iordanis Paschalidis; Konstantinos Trigkonis	Germany; Roland Gäbler; Nahid Gäbler	Italy; Matteo Ferraglia; Lorenzo Bianchini
2013 Ibiza	Greece; Iordanis Paschalidis; Konstantinos Trigkonis	Germany; Roland Gäbler; Nahid Gäbler	Australia; Brett Burvill; Faris Chase
2014 Nedlands	Greece; Iordanis Paschalidis; Konstantinos Trigkonis	Australia; Brett Burvill; Ryan Duffield	Germany; Roland Gäbler; Nahid Gäbler
2015 Carnac	Greece; Iordanis Paschalidis; Konstantinos Trigkonis	Germany; Roland Gäbler; Nahid Gäbler	Greece; Mavros Nikolaos; Tagaropoulos Alexandros
2016 Lindau	Iordanis Paschalidis (GRE); Konstantinos Trigonis (GRE)	Australia; Gavin Colby; Billy Leonard	Estela Jentsch (GER); Daniel Brown (GER)
2017; Thessaloniki (GRE); 23 Boats	Iordanis Paschalidis (GRE); Konstantinos Trigonis (GRE)		
2018; La Grande Motte (FRA); 24 Boats	Iordanis Paschalidis (GRE); Konstantinos Trigonis (GRE)	Brett Burvill (AUS); Max Puttman (AUS)	Estela Jentsch (GER); Daniel Brown (GER)
2019; Takapuna (NZL); 23 Boats	Brett Burvill (AUS); Max Puttman (AUS)	Jorg Steiner (SUI); Michael Gloor (SUI)	Estela Jentsch (GER); Daniel Brown (GER)
2021; Thessaloniki (GRE); 17 Boats	Konstantinos Trigonis (GRE); Konstantinos Kazantzis (GRE)	Michaela Pavlisova (CZE); Marek Pavlis (CZE)	Nikolaos Mavros (GRE); Periklis Aidinidis (GRE)
2022; La Grande Motte (FRA); 24 Boats	Konstantinos Trigonis (GRE); Konstantinos Kazantzis (GRE)	Yoann Trécul (FRA); Thomas Ferrand (FRA)	Brett Burvill (AUS); Kirsikka Raisainen (FIN)
2023; Dervio (ITA); 30 Boats	Yoann Trécul (FRA); Thomas Ferrand (FRA)	Angelika Kohlendorfer (AUT); Calvin Claus (AUT)	Marcel Steiner (SUI); Jörg Steiner (SUI)
2024; Rimini (ITA); 29 Boats	Angelika Kohlendorfer (AUT); Calvin Claus (AUT)	Marcel Steiner (SUI); Ben Steiner (SUI)	Yoann Trécul (FRA); Thomas Ferrand (FRA)

==== Mixed ====
Year	Gold	Silver	Bronze
2010 Travemünde	Germany; Roland Gäbler; Nahid Gäbler	Germany; Kiki Loweg; Florian Loweg	Germany; Andreas Behem; Katharina Behem
2011 Biel	Germany; Roland Gäbler; Nahid Gäbler	Austria; Nicole Salzmann; Dietmar Salzmann	Switzerland; Martin Rusterholz; Julia Rusterholz
2012 Torbole	Germany; Roland Gäbler; Nahid Gäbler	Germany; Dieter Maurer; Maren Odefey	Spain; Jürgen Jentsch; Sarah Steimer Klees
2013 Ibiza	Germany; Roland Gäbler; Nahid Gäbler	Switzerland; Jean-Marc Cuanillion; Gudrun Kolb	Greece; Maria Tsausidou; Michael Papadopolus
2014 Nedlands	Germany; Roland Gäbler; Nahid Gäbler	Spain; Jürgen Jentsch; Sarah Steimer Klees	Greece; Maria Tsausidou; Marc Baier
2015 Carnac	Germany; Roland Gäbler; Nahid Gäbler	Switzerland; Jean-Marc Cuanillion; Gudrun Kolb	Czech Republic; Zdeněk Pavlis; Michaela Pavlisova
2016 Lindau	Australia; Brett Burvill; Estela Jentsch	Greece; Maria Tsausidou; Michael Papadopolus	Czech Republic; Zdeněk Pavlis; Michaela Pavlisova
2017 Thessaloniki	Czech Republic; Zdeněk Pavlis; Michaela Pavlisova	Germany; Jürgen Jentsch; Sarah Jentsch	Czech Republic; Markus Betz; Monika Schuster

== See also ==
- List of multihulls
