= John Forbes (sailor) =

Australian sailor

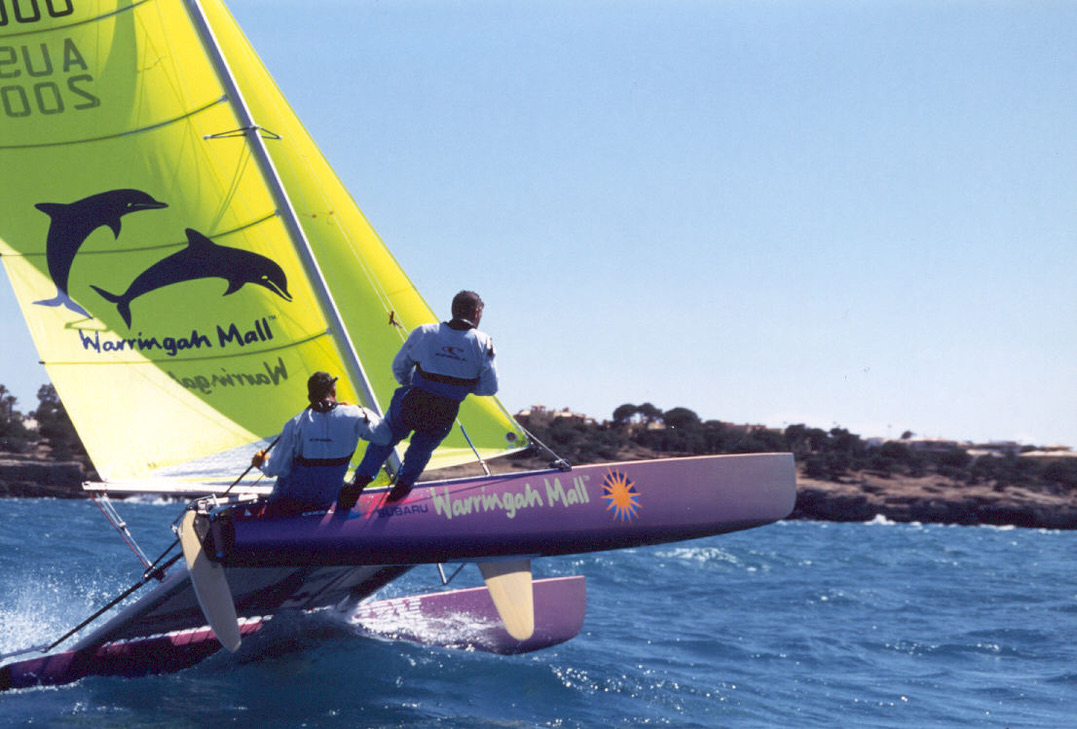
- John Forbes and Darren Bundock

Personal information
- Nickname: Gonzo
- Nationality: Australian
- Born: 29 January 1970 (age 56)
- Height: 69"

Sailing career
- Sport: Sailing
- Classes: Tornado; Hobie 18; Nacra 5.2; Nacra 5.8
Medal record
Sailing
Representing Australia
Olympic Games
Silver medal – second place	2000 Sydney	Tornado class
Bronze medal – third place	1992 Barcelona	Tornado class

John Forbes (born 29 January 1970) is an Australian sailor who competed in three Olympic Games, winning a bronze medal in Barcelona 1992 and a silver medal at the Sydney 2000 Games.

Forbes won seven World championships, four European Championships, and ten Australian Championships. He was voted Australian Sailor of the Year four times (1991/92, 2001/02, 2002/03, & 2003/04) and held a scholarship from the Australian Institute of Sport In 2023, he was inducted into the New South Wales Hall Of Champions.

== Biography ==
=== Early life ===
John Forbes was introduced to international level catamaran sailing at age 12. He and his father Bob went to the US to compete in the Nacra 5.2 North American Championships in 1982, where they placed fourth. The following year, John and Bob attended the inaugural Nacra 5.2 World Championship, and came second. John then traveled to Monterey Bay with fellow Australian David Renouf where they finished in 4th place in the Nacra 5.8 North American Championship.

In 1985 Forbes won the Australian Combined High Schools Championship outright with his brother Rod on a Nacra 5.2.

With Rod as his crew, John also came 3rd in the 1985 Nacra 5.2 NSW State Championship, 1st in the 1986 Nacra 5.2 NSW State Championship, 2nd in the Prindle 18 National Championship, and 4th in the Nacra 5.2 Australian Championship.

Forbes's first introduction to the International Tornado class was at the Australian Championship 1986–87 in Perth, where, while only 16, he helmed his first Tornado catamaran and placed 10th.

1984 Olympic bronze medalist Chris Cairns invited Forbes to sail together. Together, they won the Kiel Week regatta in 1987 followed by a second place in the Tornado World Championship of 1987.

=== Tornado with Mitch Booth (1989–1994) ===
In 1989, Forbes teamed up with Rod Waterhouse to win the Australian Tornado Championship with a perfect score, winning all 8 races. Rod Waterhouse's inability to travel overseas in 1989 led John to join up with rival Mitch Booth, and together they won the 1989 World Championship in Houston, Texas, 36 points ahead of Giorgio Zuccoli from Italy. They also won the Australian Tornado Championships in 1990 and 1991.

In 1991 Forbes won the inaugural Nacra 5.8 World Championship in Hervey Bay, Queensland. Booth and Forbes's credits also include winning the Tornado Australian Championships in 1992, 1993, and 1994, and in 1992 they won their second Tornado World Championship in Perth, Australia.

Gold and silver medals were also won in the Barcelona Pre-Olympic Games in 1990 and 1991 respectively, and the pair won a bronze medal at the 1992 Barcelona Olympic Games. As a result, they were jointly awarded the prestigious 'New South Wales Yachtsman of the Year' trophy in November 1991 and again in 1992. As a final toast, they were again jointly honored with the distinguished award of Ampol Australian Yachtsman of the Year in 1992.

Mitch and John scored second place at the 1993 Tornado World Championship in Long Beach, California and a third place at the 1994 World Championship in Båstad, Sweden.

Forbes was elected President of the Australian International Tornado Association (AITA) in 1994 and re-elected in 1996. At the International Tornado Association (ITA) AGM in Canada in August 1995, Forbes was also elected as President of the ITA in charge of International and Olympic affairs and was also responsible for the election of the new younger and proactive Technical Committee of the ITA. Forbes was just 25 years old at the time of his election as ITA President.

=== Tornado with Darren Bundock (1995–2004) ===
In December 1994 Forbes broke up with his partner Mitch Booth. Forbes teamed up with his main competitor and long-time catamaran sailor Darren Bundock who had impressed Forbes during his 1992 Olympic Games Campaign. Together they established a successful two-boat training campaign as part of their lead-up to the 1996 Selection Regattas.

January 1996 saw Forbes and Bundock win the Australian Championship by 10 points in preparation for the 1996 World Championships. At the 1996 World Championship (Mooloolaba, Australia), Forbes and Bundock finished third overall.

Due to the Australian Yachting Federation changing the AOC endorsed Olympic Selection Criteria after the first of the two Olympic Selection Regattas had been completed, Forbes and Bundock were denied from selection to the Australian Olympic Team. The pair won the 1996 NSW and QLD State Championships.

1997 saw Forbes and Bundock top the Australian Yachting circuit by defending their National title in Perth, winning the International 'Sail Melbourne, Go for Gold' regatta and placing second in the 'Sail Sydney' regatta. Forbes and Bundock placed best Australian in both the 1997 NSW State Titles (3rd overall) and the Australian International Regatta, Sydney (2nd overall), a 5th place (3rd Nation) at the 1997 World Championship in Bermuda and then the 1997 Sydney International Regatta.

1998 started off with Forbes and Bundock winning their third Australian Championship in a row. In May and June they went off to Europe to place third at both the European Championships in Greece and the Kiel Week event in Germany as well as winning the Danish Spring Cup and placing the best Australian in the Dutch Spa Regatta. In September, Forbes and Bundock won gold medal at the Sydney Harbour Regatta, organized by SOCOG as the first ever Sydney 2000 Olympic Test event. In November Forbes and Bundock won both the South American Championship and the 1998 World Championship in Armação dos Búzios, Brazil. They won the World Championship by 18 points over long-time training partners Roland Gaebler and Rene Schwall of Germany. This win made John the first Tornado sailor to win three world championships. Since 1967, there were eight sailors who had previously won two world championships. 31 years after the inaugural event, Forbes became the first person to win the Tornado World Championship three times.

Forbes and Bundock won Sail Melbourne and the 'Sail Auckland' regatta in 1999. By the end of the year they had finished a four-month European campaign and captured the Number 1 spot on the 'ISAF O’Neill' World Rankings after winning the Trofeo Princesa Sofía in Palma, the European Championship (Spain), 'Kiel Week' (Germany) and placing 3rd in the Semaine Olympique Française in Hyères and 4th at the World Championships in Copenhagen, Denmark. By the end of January 2000 they were selected into the Olympic Team to represent Australia in their hometown of Sydney, where they won the silver medal.

In 2001 Bundock and Forbes won the World Championship in Richards Bay, South Africa and their second European Championship in Silvaplana, Switzerland. They also won the 2001/02 Australian Championship for the fourth time together (Forbes’ 10th time) and the 2002 NSW State Titles.

== Awards and rewards ==
On 11 December 2001 Forbes and Bundock were one of five finalists for the NSW Institute of Sports "Athlete of the Year". On 17 December 2001 Forbes was inducted into the Sydney Northern Beaches Hall of Fame. On 27 February 2002 Forbes and Bundock were awarded the Australian Institute of Sport "Top Athlete/Team of the Year". This was then followed by Forbes and Bundock being awarded the "2001/02 BEA Australian Sailor of the Year" award at Darling Harbour on 8 June 2002.

Forbes and Bundock continued their success in 2003 winning the 2003 European Championship (Gran Canaria), the 2003 Athens Test Event (Pre-Olympics) and the 2003 World Championship (Cádiz, Spain). The pair were selected to represent Australia at the Athens 2004 Olympic Games.

As a result of the successes both in 2002 and 2003 Forbes and Bundock also received the following accolades: Australian Institute of Sport – Team of the Year. Australian Yachting Federation – Male Sailors of the Year. NSW Yachting Association – Male Sailors of the Year. NSW Institute of Sport – Team Athletes of the Year. International Sailing Federation – Rolex World Sailor of the Year – finalist.

Forbes and Bundock were the favourites leading up to the Athens 2004 Olympics. After a light, shifty regatta they finished 6th place overall in Athens. Afterwards Forbes announced his retirement from the sport due to family and work commitments.

== Results ==
Olympic Games – Sailing
Year	Position	Class	Location
2004	6th	Tornado	Athens
2000	2nd	Tornado	Sydney
1992	3rd	Tornado	Barcelona

World Championships – Sailing
Year	Position	Class	Location
2004	3rd	Tornado	Palma de Mallorca, Spain
2003	1st	Tornado	Cádiz, Spain
2002	1st	Tornado	Martha's Vineyard, United States
2001	1st	Tornado	Richards Bay, South Africa
2000	6th	Tornado	Sydney, Australia
1999	4th	Tornado	Copenhagen, Denmark
1998	1st	Tornado	Armação dos Búzios, Brazil
1997	5th	Tornado	Great Sound, Bermuda
1996	3rd	Tornado	Mooloolaba, Australia
1995	14th	Tornado	Kingston, Canada
1994	3rd	Tornado	Brastad, Sweden
1993	2nd	Tornado	Long Beach, United States
1992	1st	Tornado	Cockburn, Australia
1991	18th	Tornado	Cagliari, Italy
1991	1st	Nacra 5.8	Hervey Bay, Australia
1990	16th	Tornado	Medemblik, Noetherlands
1989	1st	Tornado	Houston, United States
1987	2nd	Tornado	Kiel, Germany
1983	2nd	Nacra 5.2	Racine, United States

Continental Championships – Sailing
Year	Position	Class	Continent	Location
2025	2nd	Hobie 20	North America	Dallas, United States
2024	1st	Hobie 18	North America	Keystone Lake, United States
2023	1st	Hobie 18	North America	Lake Quinault, United States
2004	1st	Tornado	Europe	Las Palmas, Spain
2003	1st	Tornado	Europe	Cagliari, Italy
2002	4th	Tornado	Europe	Vilamoura, Portugal
2001	1st	Tornado	Europe	Silvaplana, Switzerland
2000	2nd	Tornado	Europe	Alassio, Italy
1999	1st	Tornado	Europe	Pollença, Spain
1998	1st	Tornado	South America	Armação dos Búzios, Brazil
1998	3rd	Tornado	Europe	Porto Carras, Greece
1983	6th	Nacra 5.8	North America	Monterey, United States
1982	4th	Nacra 5.2	North America	New Jersey, United States
