= Spitfire (catamaran) =

Development
- Designer: Reg White & Yves Loday
- Year: c.2001
- Name: Spitfire

Boat
- Crew: 2
- Trapeze: Twin

Hull
- Type: High Performance Catamaran
- Construction: Sandwich Polyester
- Hull weight: Boat Weight 139 kg (306 lb)

Rig
- Rig type: Mainsail, Jib & Asymmetric Spinnaker

Sails
- Mainsail area: 15.5 m^{2} (167 sq ft)
- Jib/genoa area: 4.5 m^{2} (48 sq ft)
- Spinnaker area: 19.0 m^{2} (205 sq ft)

The Spitfire is a high-performance catamaran used for training and racing. It was designed by two Olympic gold medalists in the Tornado class, Reg White and Yves Loday.

In the UK, the Spitfire is the RYA Youth Catamaran as well as a successful racing class with National Championships held annually. The youth squad sailors compete at the class events like open meetings and nationals as well as some 'youth only' events such as the RYA Youth National Championships and youth squad training events.

== Overview ==
The Spitfire, at 16 ft, is relatively small in comparison to the other main catamaran racing classes in the UK (F18s, Tornados, Hurricane 5.9s, Dart 18s and Sprint 15s). The Spitfire is a competitive racing class at handicap events, Spitfire events or in club races and is regularly seen in pole position at UK catamaran events. The British Spitfire Class Association provide the latest Spitfire news via their Facebook page and organize Spitfire events such as the inland and nationals championships. The Inland Championships are raced for the Jess Eales Memorial Trophy, in memory of one of the classes best and most well respected sailors.

== Youth Squad ==
The Spitfire was selected to replace the Hobie Dragoon as the RYA Youth Catamaran and since then it has become a top youth class. After the 34th Americas Cup which was held on AC45 and AC72 Catamarans, the numbers of sailors not only in the youth squad, but in the class in general, reached record numbers and at the 2016 RYA Youth Nationals, 13 entries were recorded (almost twice the number of entries in 2014). The UKCRA Youth Squad use the Spitfire as their training platform and their main racing class however the squad also attend events in other classes such as the SL16 World Championships and the Red Bull Foiling Generation. The Spitfire was replaced as the RYA Youth Multihull in 2017 by the new Nacra 15.

== Champions ==
European Champion

Year	Nation	Location	Helm	Crew
2002	(France)	Locmariaquer Sailing Club	(France) Fabrice Berranger	(France) Stephane Berranger
2003	(England)	Netley Sailing Club	(United Kingdom) Stuart Gummer	(United Kingdom) Chris Rashley
2005	(Republic of Ireland)	Royal Cork Yacht Club	(United Kingdom) Chris Sproat	(United Kingdom) Georgina Burke
2006	(England)	Yaverland Sailing Club	(United Kingdom) Chris Sproat	(United Kingdom) Georgina Burke
2007	(France)	Locmariaquer Sailing Club	(France) Jonathan Loday	(France) Arnaud Gautier
2008	(Belgium)	Ostend Sailing and Racing Club	(United Kingdom) Chris Sproat	(United Kingdom) Georgina Burke

UK National Champion

Year	Location	Helm	Crew
2002	Whitstable Yacht Club	Stuart Gummer	Chris Rashley
2004	Stokes Bay Sailing Club	Mike Scantlebury	Dave Harris
2005	Worthing Yacht Club	Jonathon Loday	Ellen Forshaw
2006	Pagham Yacht Club	Jonothon Loday	Mike Windle
2007	Pagham Yacht Club	Stuart Gummer	Hannah Burke
2008	Brightlingsea Sailing Club	Chris Sproat	Georgina Burke
2009	Minnis Bay Sailing Club	Alex Farr	Marcelle Newbold
2010	Brightlingsea Sailing Club	Henry White	Ed Redfearn
2011	Minnis Bay Sailing Club	Rupert White	Nicola Boniface
2012	Brightlingsea Sailing Club	Rupert White	Nicola Boniface
2013	Eastbourne Sovereign Sailing Club	Gary Smith	Lynn Whitmore
2014	Brightlingsea Sailing Club	Paul Limpus	Oli Greber
2015	Stokes Bay Sailing Club	Jack Butters	Sam James
2016	Brightlingsea Sailing Club	Jack Butters	James King
2017	Stokes Bay Sailing Club	James Stacey	Catherine Elson
2018	Brightlingsea Sailing Club	Tom King	James King

UK Inland Champion

Year	Location	Helm	Crew
2001	Grafham Water Sailing Club	Yves Loday	James Bird
2002	Grafham Water Sailing Club	Stuart Gummer	Chris Rashley
2005	Grafham Water Sailing Club	Alex Farr	Marcelle Newbold
2006	Grafham Water Sailing Club	Chris Rashley	Elizabeth Jury
2009	Grafham Water Sailing Club	Henry White	Ed Redfearn
2010	Grafham Water Sailing Club	Henry White	Ed Redfearn
2013	Grafham Water Sailing Club	Grant Piggott	Megan Smith
2014	Grafham Water Sailing Club	Tony Stokes	William Smith
2015	Grafham Water Sailing Club	Jack Butters	James King
2016	Grafham Water Sailing Club	Matthew McRobbie	Molly Desorgher

UK Youth National Champion

Year	Nation	Location	Helm	Crew
2011	(England)	Hayling Island Sailing Club	Rupert White	Nicola Boniface
2012	(Wales)	Pwllheli Sailing Club	Andrew Sinclair	Joshua Potts
2013	(Scotland)	Largs Sailing Club	Tom Britz	Abbie Hewitt
2014	(England)	Weymouth & Portland National Sailing Academy	Sam Barker	Ross McFarlane
2015	(England)	Weymouth & Portland National Sailing Academy	Sam Barker	Victoria Akhurst
2016	(Wales)	Pwllheli Welsh National Sailing Academy	Jack Butters	James King
2017	(England)	Hayling Island Sailing Club	William Smith	Abigail Clarke

== Notable Sailors ==
Chris Rashley: International Moth UK National Champion 2015

Rupert White: SL16 ISAF Youth World Championships Bronze Medal (Helm) 2011 and SL16 ISAF Youth World Championships Gold Medal (Helm) 2012

Nicola Boniface: SL16 ISAF Youth World Champion (Crew) 2011

Tom Britz: SL16 ISAF Youth World Championships Gold Medal (Crew) 2012

James Henson: SL16 ISAF Youth World Championships Bronze Medal (Helm) 2013

Oli Greber: SL16 ISAF Youth World Championships Bronze Medal (Crew) 2013
