= Hurricane 5.9 =

Racing catamaran sailboat

Hurricane 5.9SX
Development
- Designer: Reg White
- Location: Brightlingsea
- Year: 1980s
- No. built: ≈500
- Builder: White Formula
- Name: Hurricane 5.9SX

Boat
- Crew: 2
- Displacement: 192 kg (423 lb)

Hull
- Type: Cat
- LOA: 5.9 m (19 ft)
- Beam: 2.43 m (8 ft 0 in)

Sails
- Mainsail area: 17.50 m^{2} (188.4 sq ft)
- Jib/genoa area: 4.56 m^{2} (49.1 sq ft)
- Gennaker area: 21.00 m^{2} (226.0 sq ft)

Racing
- Rating: 1.030
- RYA PN: 695

The Hurricane 5.9 is a one design racing catamaran. It was designed by Reg White in Brightlingsea in the 1980s in response to a Tornado catamaran owner's request that White Formula design a cat with equal or superior performance to the Tornado of roughly the same boat length and sail area that did not need to be dismantled for trailing, this was to be the Hurricane 5.9. When the first Hurricane 5.9s began racing, as their numbers were few, they would race alongside the Tornados to increase the racing numbers in one combined fleet.

The SX rig has updated its platform and made the class accessible to more sailors. It provides a low-cost option for competitive racing within the United Kingdom.

== Design ==
Each hull is 5.9 metres long and 2.43 metres (two feet less than that of the Tornado) wide. A second trapeze was added to for the helmsman, this was to make up for the lost righting moment with the narrower boat. At the same time, the rear of each of the 5.9 hulls was reduced to give less buoyancy than that of the Tornados to make the boats less susceptible to pitch polling when sailing downwind. The sail and spar design was also heavily updated from the Tornado's rig that had hardly changed since its launch in the 1970s.

== Hurricane 5.9SX ==
During the 2000s the platform was given a new rig option - the SX. Moving the mainsail to a square top Pentex sail with a higher boom fitment, a smaller self tacking jib and a new asymmetric spinnaker shape with a solid chute and evolved layout. Paired with smaller evolutions to blocks and rope systems this modernised the Hurricane platform and made the boat suit a wider range of sailors.

== Hurricane 4.9 ==
On the back of the success of the 5.9, Reg White took the older designed 16 foot Condor catamaran and redesigned its sails and spars. This new re-rigged Condor was given the name Hurricane 4.9.

== Performance ==
The 5.9 is designed to give Tornado-like performance coupled with smooth predictable handling. In many conditions the 5.9 will actually outpace the classic Tornado. The boat is equipped with kick up rudders and centreboards which ride up on impact, reducing risk of damage. The PET film main sail gives long life and low maintenance with less frequent need for replacement. Now with the introduction of the SX rig (3 sail) the performance has been enhanced further.

== Data ==
=== General ===
Boat Data*	
Sails	Mylar/Dacron
Construction	Foam Sandwich
Mast	Adjustable Pre-bent
Trapezes	Twin
Crew	Two
Rudders	Kick-up
Blocks	Harken
Transport	Trailable complete

Technical Data*	Hurricane 5.9	Hurricane 5.9 Sport	Hurricane 5.9 SX
Length Overall	5.9 metres	5.9 metres	5.9 metres
Beam	2.43 metres	2.43 metres	2.43 metres
Sailing weight	180.5 kg	191.5 kg	192 kg
Mainsail	17.5 m^{2}	17.5 m^{2}	17.5 m^{2}
Jib	5.9m²	5.2m²	4.563m²
Spinnaker	n/a	21m²	21m²
SCHRS	1.009	0.997	1.007
Portsmouth Yardstick			65

== Champions ==
=== European Champions ===
Year	Venue	Winning team	Home club
1989		(United Kingdom) Robin Smith (United Kingdom) Lisa Gatton	(Essex) Marconi SC
1990		(United Kingdom) Robert White (United Kingdom) Ian Newman	(Essex) Brightlingsea SC
1992		(United Kingdom) Robert White (United Kingdom) Huw Reynolds	(Essex) Brightlingsea SC
1993		(United Kingdom) William Sunnucks (United Kingdom) Rob Gutteridge	(Berkshire) Datchet Water SC
1994		(Netherlands) Erwin Kerstens (Netherlands) Jorgen Kerstens	Catclub Zeeland
1995		(United Kingdom) Robert White (United Kingdom) Graham Eeles	(Essex) Brightlingsea SC
1996		(Netherlands) Jorgen Kerstens (Netherlands) Ward Groot	Catclub Zeeland
1997		(United Kingdom) Tim Reid (United Kingdom) Trevor Hewitt	(Hampshire) Mudeford SC
1998		(United Kingdom) Jason Smith (United Kingdom) Julia Plumstead	(Hampshire) Stokes Bay SC
1999		(United Kingdom) Andy Webb (United Kingdom) Finley Humphreys	(Essex) Harwich Town SC
2000		(United Kingdom) Robin Smith (United Kingdom) Lisa Gatton	(Cambridgeshire) Grafham Water SC
2002	(Greece) Skinias	(United Kingdom) Andy Webb (United Kingdom) Finley Humphreys	(Essex) Harwich Town SC
2003	(Northern Ireland) Ballyholme	(United Kingdom) Sean Ward (United Kingdom) Jo Ward	(Hampshire) Lymington Town SC
2004		(United Kingdom) Ashley Machin (United Kingdom) Julia Machin	(Berkshire) Datchet Water SC
2005		(United Kingdom) Ashley Machin (United Kingdom) Julia Machin	(Berkshire) Datchet Water SC
2007		(United Kingdom) Grant Piggott (United Kingdom) Greg Windle	(Somerset) Weston SC
2024	(France) YC Carnac	(United Kingdom) Alex Farrall (United Kingdom) Alex Warrington	(Essex) Thorpe Bay YC

=== National Champions ===
Year	Venue	Winning team	Home Club
1989		(United Kingdom) David Williams (United Kingdom) Ian Rhodes	(Kent) Seasalter SC
1990		(United Kingdom) Robert White (Netherlands) Huub Lambriek	(Essex) Brightlingsea SC
1991		(United Kingdom) Tim Reid (United Kingdom) Trevor Hewitt	(Dorset) Mudeford SC
1992		(United Kingdom) Tony Wetherall (United Kingdom) Jeremy Mitcham	(Yorkshire) Beaver SC
1993		(United Kingdom) Robert White (United Kingdom) Graham Eeles	(Essex) Brightlingsea SC
1994		(United Kingdom) Tim Reid (United Kingdom) Sally Fisher	(Dorset) Mudeford SC
1995		(United Kingdom) Tim Reid (United Kingdom) Trevor Hewitt	(Dorset) Mudeford SC
1996		(United Kingdom) Tim Reid (United Kingdom) Trevor Hewitt	(Dorset) Mudeford SC
1997		(United Kingdom) Tim Reid (United Kingdom) Trevor Hewitt	(Dorset) Mudeford SC
1998		(United Kingdom) Will Sunnucks (United Kingdom) Rob Gutteridge	(Essex) Brightlingsea SC
1999	(Devon) Starcross YC	(United Kingdom) Andy Webb (United Kingdom) Paul Gray	(Essex) Harwich Town SC
2000		(United Kingdom) Andy Webb (United Kingdom) Paul Gray	(Essex) Harwich Town SC
2001	(Devon) Mayflower SC	(United Kingdom) Andy Webb (United Kingdom) Paul Gray	(Essex) Harwich Town SC
2002	(Kent) Minnis Bay SC	(United Kingdom) William Sunnucks (United Kingdom) Mark Self	(Essex) Brightlingsea SC
2003		(United Kingdom) Andy Webb (United Kingdom) Finlay Humphries	(Essex) Harwich Town SC
2004	(Wales) Pwllheli SC	(United Kingdom) Andy Webb (United Kingdom) Paul Gray	(Essex) Harwich Town SC
2005	(Essex) Harwich Town SC	(United Kingdom) Andy Webb (United Kingdom) Paul Gray	(Essex) Harwich Town SC
2006	(Essex) Stone SC	(United Kingdom) John Ready (United Kingdom) Ryan Crawford	(Hampshire) Stokes Bay SC
2007		(United Kingdom) Grant Piggott (United Kingdom) Gred Windle	(Hampshire) Weston SC
2008	(Hampshire) Stokes Bay SC	(United Kingdom) Neil Connelly (United Kingdom) Buster Tickner	(Essex) Stone SC
2009	(Essex) Stone SC	(United Kingdom) Neil Connelly (United Kingdom) Buster Tickner	(Essex) Stone SC
2010	(Essex) Thorpe Bay SC	(United Kingdom) John Ready (Australia) Ryan Duffield	(Essex) West Mersea SC; Nedlands YC
2011		(United Kingdom) Richie Hanmore (United Kingdom) Stevie Pyman	(Essex) Stone SC
2012	(Essex) Brighltingsea SC	(United Kingdom) John Ready (United Kingdom) Jamie Bolingbroke	(Essex) West Mersea SC
2013	(Dorset) WPNSA	(United Kingdom) John Ready (Germany) Nahid Gaebler	(Essex) West Mersea SC; Kieler Yacht-Club
2014	(Essex) Harwich Town SC	(United Kingdom) Grant Piggott (United Kingdom) Adam Piggott	(Hampshire) Weston SC
2015	(Essex) Thorpe Bay SC	(United Kingdom) Jack Tindale (United Kingdom) Hugo Bull	(Essex) Stone SC
2016		(United Kingdom) Neil Connelly (United Kingdom) Trevor Bawden	(Essex) Stone SC
2017	(West Sussex) Pagham SC	(United Kingdom) Neil Connelly (United Kingdom) Trevor Bawden	(Essex) Royal Corinthian YC
2018		(United Kingdom) Neil Connelly (United Kingdom) Trevor Bawden	(Essex) Royal Corinthian YC
2019	(Essex) Canvey Island SC	(United Kingdom) Paul Palmer (United Kingdom) Robert Palmer	(Essex) Thorpe Bay YC
2020	Event cancelled due to COVID-19 pandemic		
2021	(Essex) Thorpe Bay SC	(United Kingdom) Jack Tindale (United Kingdom) Hugo Bull	(Essex) Stone SC
2022	(Essex) Stone SC	(United Kingdom) Jack Tindale (United Kingdom) Hugo Bull	(Essex) Stone SC
2023	(Essex) Harwich Town SC	(United Kingdom) Ben Harris (United Kingdom) Izzy Smith	(Hampshire) Weston SC (Devon) Starcross YC
2024	(Yorkshire) Bridlington SC	(United Kingdom) Jack Tindale (United Kingdom) Hugo Bull	(Essex) Stone SC
2025	(Devon) Paignton SC	(United Kingdom) Jack Tindale (United Kingdom) Hugo Bull	(Essex) Stone SC

*Data from UK Hurricane Class Association
