= Van Bladel =

Van Bladel is a surname. Notable people with this surname include:

- Cees van Bladel (born 1962), Dutch sailor
- Jean van Bladel (1922-2018), Belgian electrical engineer and physicist
- Leonie van Bladel (born 1939), Dutch former politician, presenter, and journalist
- Willy van Bladel (born 1960), sailor

== See also ==
- Bladel (disambiguation)
