= Cees van Bladel =

Dutch sailor (born 1962)

Personal information
- Full name: Cornelis Wilhelmus Nicolaas van Bladel
- Nationality: Dutch
- Born: 2 May 1962 (age 64) Eindhoven, Netherlands
- Height: 1.89 m (6.2 ft)

Sailing career
- Sport: Sailing
- Class: Tornado
- Updated on 2014-01-10

Cornelis Wilhelmus Nicolaas "Cees" van Bladel (born 2 May 1962 in Eindhoven) is a sailor from the Netherlands, who represented his country at the 1988 Summer Olympics in Pusan. With his older brother Willy van Bladel as crew, Van Bladel took the 9th place in the Tornado. Earlier during the 1984 Olympics Van Bladel vas a substitute for the Dutch Olympic Sailing Team.

== Sailing career ==
After sailing Vaurien and 470 with his brother Willy van Bladel he made the move to the Tornado.

== Professional life ==
Van Bladel holds a bachelor's degree at the Fontys Hogescholen (1980–1984) and a Master's degree at the Vrije Universiteit (1984–1988) in Human Movement Science. Van Bladel held the following positions:

- Taakveldcoordinator sector welzijn, Eindhoven (1991–2005)
- Projectmanager, Sports and Technology (2005 – present)
- Owner Planeer b.v. (2005 – present)
- Director InnoSportLab Sailing (2009 – present)
- Owner, Director Volans Solutions b.v (2010 – present)

== Sources ==
- "Cees van Bladel Bio, Stats, and Results". Olympic Sports. Sports-Reference.com. Archived from the original on 18 April 2020.
- "Oranje équipe met 207 personen op de Zomerspelen". Dagblad De Telegraaf (in Dutch). 11 July 1984.
- "Toppers bijeen in Hyeres Olympisch zeilexamen". Dagblad De Telegraaf (in Dutch). 19 April 1984.
- "Aspiraties". Dagblad De Telegraaf (in Dutch). 30 April 1984.
- "Verwachtingen voor Los Angeles hoog gespannen Gouden kansen voor olympische zeilptoeg". Dagblad De Telegraaf (in Dutch). 28 July 1984.
- "Zeilcoach rekent op een medaille". Dagblad De Telegraaf (in Dutch). 31 July 1984.
- "Zeilers smeken om meer wind". Dagblad De Telegraaf (in Dutch). 3 August 1984.
- "Zeilers verspelen kansen op medaille Tijdperk 'Vliegende Hollanders' voorbij". Dagblad De Telegraaf (in Dutch). 8 August 1984.
- "Surfgoud kan impuls geven Watersport wacht op frisse wind". Dagblad De Telegraaf (in Dutch). 11 August 1984.
- Official Report Los Angeles 1984, Volume 1: Organization and Planning (part 1) (PDF). Los Angeles: Los Angeles Olympic Organizing Committee. 1985. Archived from the original (PDF) on 28 January 2015.
- Official Report Los Angeles 1984, Volume 1: Organization and Planning (part 2) (PDF). Los Angeles: Los Angeles Olympic Organizing Committee. 1985. Archived from the original (PDF) on 17 October 2013.
- Official Report Los Angeles 1984, Volume 1: Organization and Planning (part 3) (PDF). Los Angeles: Los Angeles Olympic Organizing Committee. 1985. Archived from the original (PDF) on 17 October 2013.
- Official Report Los Angeles 1984, Volume 2: Competition and Summary and Results (part 1) (PDF). Los Angeles: Los Angeles Olympic Organizing Committee. 1985. Archived from the original (PDF) on 17 October 2013.
- Official Report Los Angeles 1984, Volume 2: Competition and Summary and Results (part 2) (PDF). Los Angeles: Los Angeles Olympic Organizing Committee. 1985. Archived from the original (PDF) on 7 October 2013.
- Official Report Los Angeles 1984, Volume 2: Competition and Summary and Results (part 3) (PDF). Los Angeles: Los Angeles Olympic Organizing Committee. 1985. Archived from the original (PDF) on 17 October 2013.
- "De Nederlandse olympische zeilploeg". De Telegraaf (in Dutch). 10 September 1988.
- "Nederlandse zeilploeg met lege handen naar huis". De Telegraaf (in Dutch). 28 September 1988.
- Official Report, Volume 1: Organization and Planning (PDF). Seoul: Olympic Organizing Committee. 1989. Archived from the original (PDF) on 4 March 2016.
- Official Report, Volume 2: Competition, Summary and Results (PDF). Seoul: Seoul Olympic Organizing Committee. 1989. Archived from the original (PDF) on 7 October 2013.
- "De Nederlandse olympische zeilploeg". De Telegraaf (in Dutch). 10 September 1988.
- "Nederlandse zeilploeg met lege handen naar huis". De Telegraaf (in Dutch). 28 September 1988.
- Official Report, Volume 1: Organization and Planning (PDF). Seoul: Olympic Organizing Committee. 1989. Archived from the original (PDF) on 4 March 2016.
- Official Report, Volume 2: Competition, Summary and Results (PDF). Seoul: Seoul Olympic Organizing Committee. 1989. Archived from the original (PDF) on 7 October 2013.
- "Cees van Bladel". www.linkedin.com.
