= Fernando León Boissier =

Spanish sailor

Medal record

Representing Spain

Men's sailing

Olympic Games
Gold medal – first place	1996 Atlanta	Tornado

Fernando León Boissier (born 28 May 1966) is a Spanish sailor and Olympic champion. He competed at the 1996 Summer Olympics in Atlanta and won a gold medal in the Tornado class, together with José Luis Ballester.

He also won the Youth Sailing World Championships in 420 in 1982, and the Tornado Worlds in 1994.

In 2008 he finished third at the Snipe European Championship.
