= Rex Sellers =

New Zealand sailor

Rex Sellers MNZM
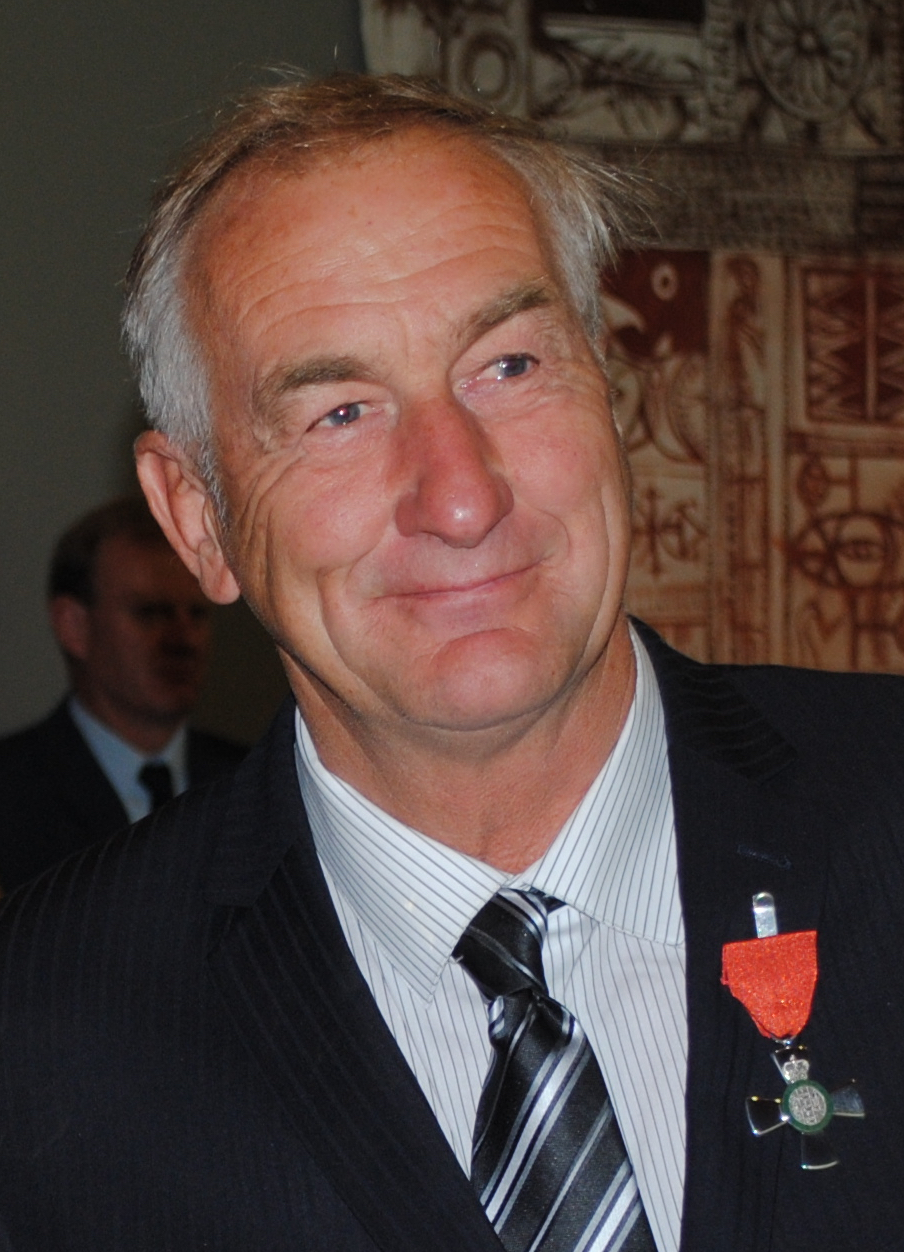
- Sellers in 2010

Personal information
- Full name: Rex Samuel Sellers
- Born: 11 November 1950 (age 75) Nelson, New Zealand
- Height: 183 cm (6 ft 0 in)
- Weight: 75 kg (165 lb)
Medal record
Men's sailing
Representing New Zealand
Olympic Games
Gold medal – first place	1984 Los Angeles	Tornado class
Silver medal – second place	1988 Seoul	Tornado class

Rex Samuel Sellers MNZM (born 11 November 1950) is a yachtman from New Zealand. He won a gold medal in the 1984 Summer Olympics in Los Angeles, and a silver medal in the 1988 Summer Olympics in Seoul, both in the Tornado class with Chris Timms. He also competed in the Tornado class with Brian Jones at the 1992 and 1996 Olympics, where they finished fourth and 15th respectively. Sellers and Gerald Sly were selected to sail in the Tornado class for New Zealand at the 1980 Olympic Games in Moscow, but did not compete because of the US-led boycott.

Sellers attended Nelson College from 1965 to 1967. He was appointed a Member of the New Zealand Order of Merit in the 2010 New Year Honours, for services to yachting.

Sellers had a daughter, Justina Kitchen, in 1989. She is an exponent in Formula Kite and represented New Zealand in that class at the 2024 Olympics.
