= Roland Gäbler =

German sailor (born 1964)

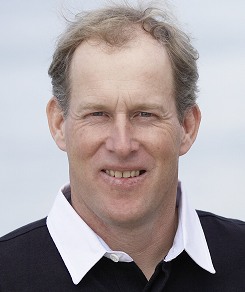
Roland Gäbler (2009)

Roland Gäbler (born 9 October 1964 in Bremen) is a German sailor and member in the Norddeutscher Regatta Verein as well as in the Kieler Yacht-Club. He competed in five Olympic Games.

Roland Gäbler grew up in Bremen, where he started sailing on the river Weser. His talent for sailing was advanced by his parents, who bought him an old Laser. At the age of 14 he competed in his first regatta, one year later he won his first sailing competition. During his career in the Laser dinghy, Roland Gäbler won two European Championships and 14 international Championships.

With 23 years Roland Gäbler switched the racing class to catamaran and sailed a Tornado, together with his Laser training partner Hans-Jürgen Pfohe. Both competed in the Kiel Week and qualified straightaway for the 1988 Summer Olympics in Seoul, however they won no medal. During the rough regatta Roland Gäbler suffered a fracture of his hand.

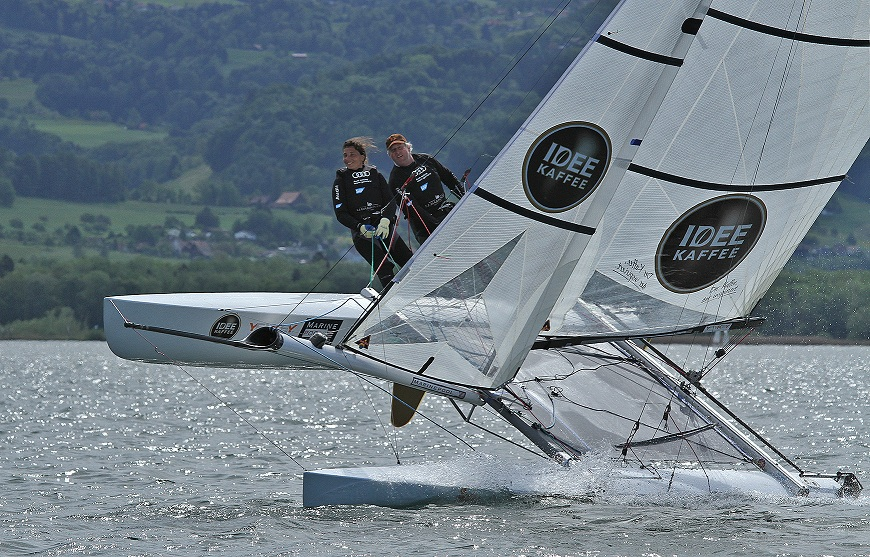
Tornado European Champions 2013

Job reasons forced Hans-Jürgen Pfohe to quit sailing in 1989. Frank Parlow became Roland Gäblers new partner. The team won four European Tornado Championships and the World Championship in 1996 for the first time. Also the cooperation with Frank Parlow was fruitful: they qualified for the 1992 Summer Olympics in Barcelona (11. place) and the 1996 Summer Olympics in Atlanta (7. place).

In 1997 René Schwall became crew and team partner of Roland Gäbler. They won two further World Championships and three European Championships as well as a bronze medal at the 2000 Summer Olympics in Sydney. In 2001 Roland Gäbler became German head coach of the Deutscher Segler-Verband for the Tornado and 49er class.

In 1995 and 1997 Roland Gäbler was awarded the title German Sailor of the Year as well as two times the award Silbernes Lorbeerblatt.

Roland Gäbler together with the adventurer and balloonist Steve Fossett also established a world record in high-speed sailing on the catamaran PlayStation (34m length) in 2001.

Together with Gunnar Struckmann as crew Roland Gäbler won the German championship, the Volvo Champions Race and the Kiel Week 2005 - Gäblers fifth success in this competition. Together they sailed the Olympic Games in Athens in 2004 (11. place).

Since 2009 Roland Gäbler has been sailing with his wife Nahid Gäbler. They straight away won the Travemünde Week and the German championship 2009. In 2010 they won the World Championship in Tornado sailing - as first mixed team ever. Together they are 6 times Mixed World Champions and 6 times Mixed European Champions in a row, and in 2013 and 2015 they also become European Champions in the Open Tornado (sailboat). In 2015 Roland has won 10 times Gold medals in Tornado World Championship in 2015.

Besides several national and international titles, they also become winner of the Kiel Week in Tornado (sailboat) 2012 Kiel, Germany, and winner of the Blue Ribbon of Round Fehmarn - Open class 2010.

In 2010 Roland Gäbler wins the biggest blue ribbon race on lake Balaton with the Ventilo M2 multihull with the boatowner Rolf Hufnagel. In 2011 he is also winner of the Gorla race 2011 under 30 foot - Ventilo M2 with the boatowner Rolf Hufnagel and his wife Nahid Gäbler as crew.

In the season 2011 Roland Gäbler was skipper on the Extreme 40 named Team Extreme in Extreme Sailing Series.
