= Bladel (disambiguation) =

Bladel is a municipality and town in the province of North Brabant, Southern Netherlands.

Bladel may also refer to:

== Surname ==
- Fran Bladel (1933–2023), Australian politician
- Maurice Bladel (1886–1968), Belgian writer
- Rudy Bladel (1932–2006), American serial killer

== Place ==
- Bladel en Netersel, former municipality of North Brabant, Netherlands

== See also ==
- Van Bladel, a surname list
