= Mark Bulkeley =

British sailor (born 1979)

Personal information
- Nationality: British
- Born: 3 April 1979 (age 47) Yakusu, Zaire

Sailing career
- Sport: Sailing
- Class: Tornado
Medal record
Sailing
Representing Great Britain
World Championships
Silver medal – second place	2003 Cádiz	Tornado

Mark Bulkeley (born 3 April 1979) is a British sailor who competed in the 2004 Summer Olympics in the Tornado class.

Bulkeley was born in Yakusu, Zaire, to Lyn, a physician, and Carol, a nurse. He began sailing at the Marconi Sailing Club after having relocated to Essex.

Bulkeley sailed the Tornado crewing for Leigh McMillan, who he had met while they were studying at Portsmouth University. The couple won a silver medal at the 2003 ISAF Sailing World Championships in Cádiz, Spain. The following year, in 2004, they finished fifth at the World Championship. At the 2004 Summer Olympics, Bulkeley and McMillan finished 13th in the Tornado event.
