= Darren Bundock =

Australian sailor (born 1971)

Medal record

Sailing

Representing Australia

Olympic Games
Silver medal – second place	2000 Sydney	Tornado class
Silver medal – second place	2008 Beijing	Tornado class

World Championships
Gold medal – first place	2025	Formula 18
Gold medal – first place	2019	Formula 18
Gold medal – first place	2011	Formula 18
Gold medal – first place	2011	Formula 16
Gold medal – first place	2009	Tornado
Gold medal – first place	2008	Tornado
Gold medal – first place	2007	Formula 18
Gold medal – first place	2006	Tornado
Gold medal – first place	2005	Formula 18
Gold medal – first place	2004	Formula 18
Gold medal – first place	2004	Tornado
Gold medal – first place	2003	Tornado
Gold medal – first place	2001	Tornado
Gold medal – first place	1998	Tornado

Darren Bundock (born 21 March 1971) is an Australian sailor from Gosford, New South Wales.

== Sailing Career ==
=== Olympic Career ===
- 2nd 2000 Summer Olympics – Tornado in Sydney with John Forbes (sailor)
- 6th 2004 Summer Olympics – Tornado in Athens with John Forbes (sailor)
- 2nd 2008 Summer Olympics – Tornado in Qingdoa with Glenn Ashby

For the 2008 games Bundock with new crew Glenn Ashby won the 2007 world champions and ranked world number one in the event going into the 2008 Summer Olympics. However, they were beaten by the Spanish crew and won silver. He was an Australian Institute of Sport scholarship holder.

=== Other Events ===
Bundock sailed with Team New Zealand in the final regatta of the 2010 Extreme Sailing Series.

Moreover, he joined America's Cup World Series team Oracle in 2011, as replacement skipper and helmsman for Russell Coutts.
