= Scott Anderson (sailor) =

Australian yacht racer

Personal information
- Full name: John Scott Anderson
- Nationality: Australian
- Born: 31 March 1954 (age 72)
- Height: 187 cm (6 ft 2 in)
- Weight: 72 kg (159 lb)

Sailing career
- Sport: Sailing
- Class: Tornado
Medal record
Sailing
Representing Australia
Olympic Games
Bronze medal – third place	1984 Los Angeles	Tornado

John Scott Anderson (born 31 March 1954) is an Australian Olympic sailor who competed in the 1984 Summer Olympics. He was 30 years old at the time and won a bronze medal in the Tornado class with skipper Christopher Cairns.

In 1986, Anderson won the A-Cat Worlds Championship in Brenzone Italy, and again, 37 years later at the 2023 Championship in Touloun, France.
