= Sailing at the 1984 Summer Olympics =

Sailing at the Games of the XXIII Olympiad
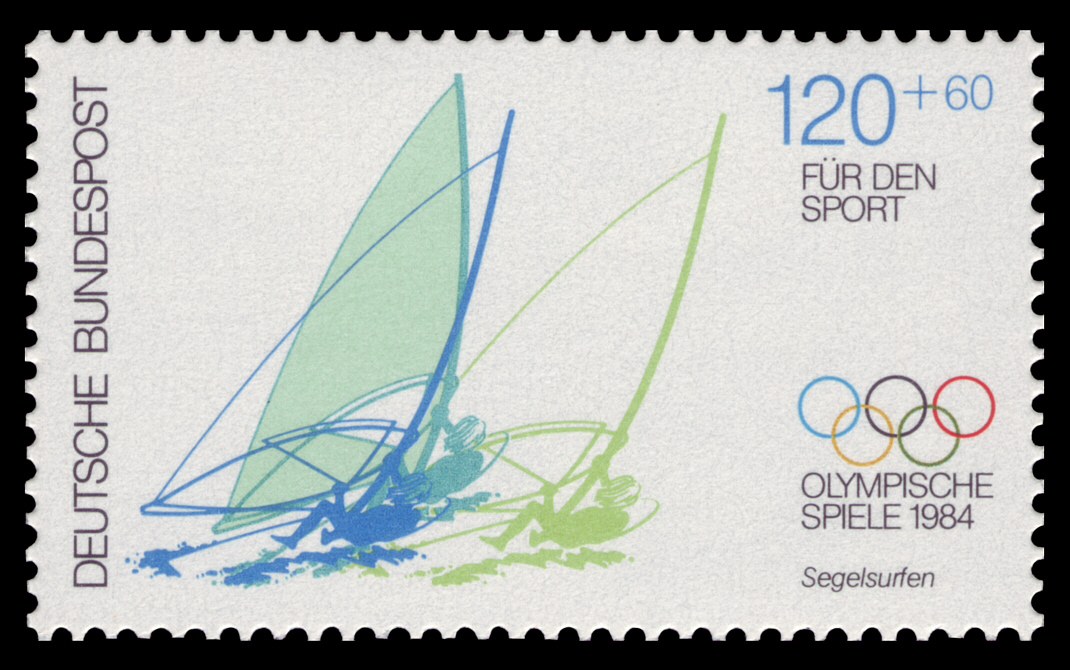
- Special stamp Germany, Olympic Windsurfing 1984
- Venues: Long Beach
- Dates: First race: 31 July 1984; Last race: 8 August 1984
- Competitors: 300 from 60 nations
- Boats and Boards: 172

Sailing/Yachting is an Olympic sport starting from the Games of the 1st Olympiad (1896 Olympics in Athens, Greece). With the exception of 1904 and possibly the canceled 1916 Summer Olympics, sailing has always been included on the Olympic schedule. sailing was always a part of the Olympic program. The Sailing program of 1984 consisted of a total of seven sailing classes (disciplines). For each class seven races were scheduled from 31 July 1984 to 8 August 1984 of the coast of Long Beach, Los Angeles County, California at the Pacific Ocean. Los Angeles hosted the Olympic sailing competitions for the second time, having previously done so during the 1932 Summer Olympics. The sailing was done on the triangular type Olympic courses.

== Venue ==
Long Beach Olympic Harbour
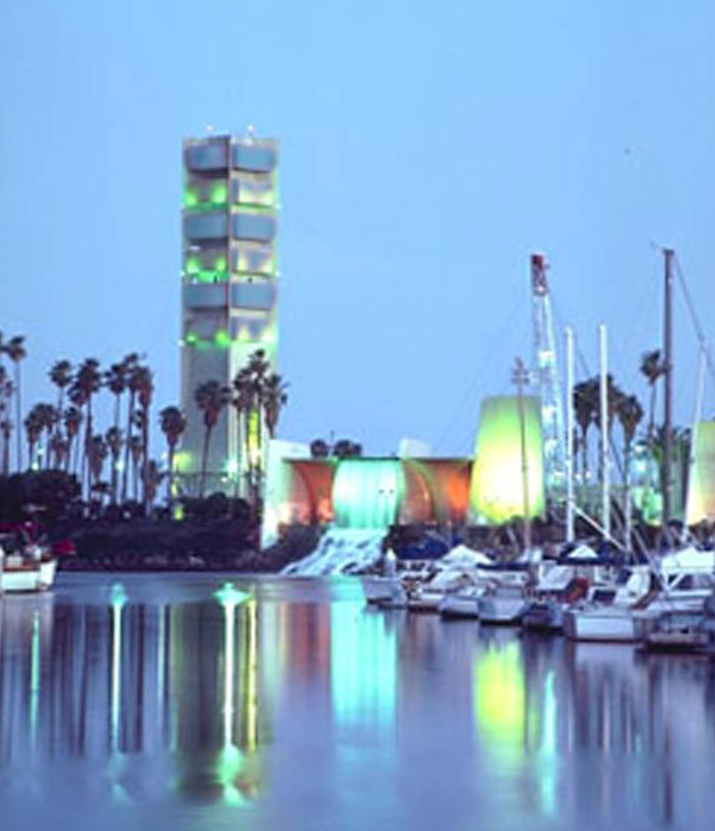
- Interactive map of Long Beach Olympic Harbour
- Coordinates: 33°45′35″N 118°11′2″W

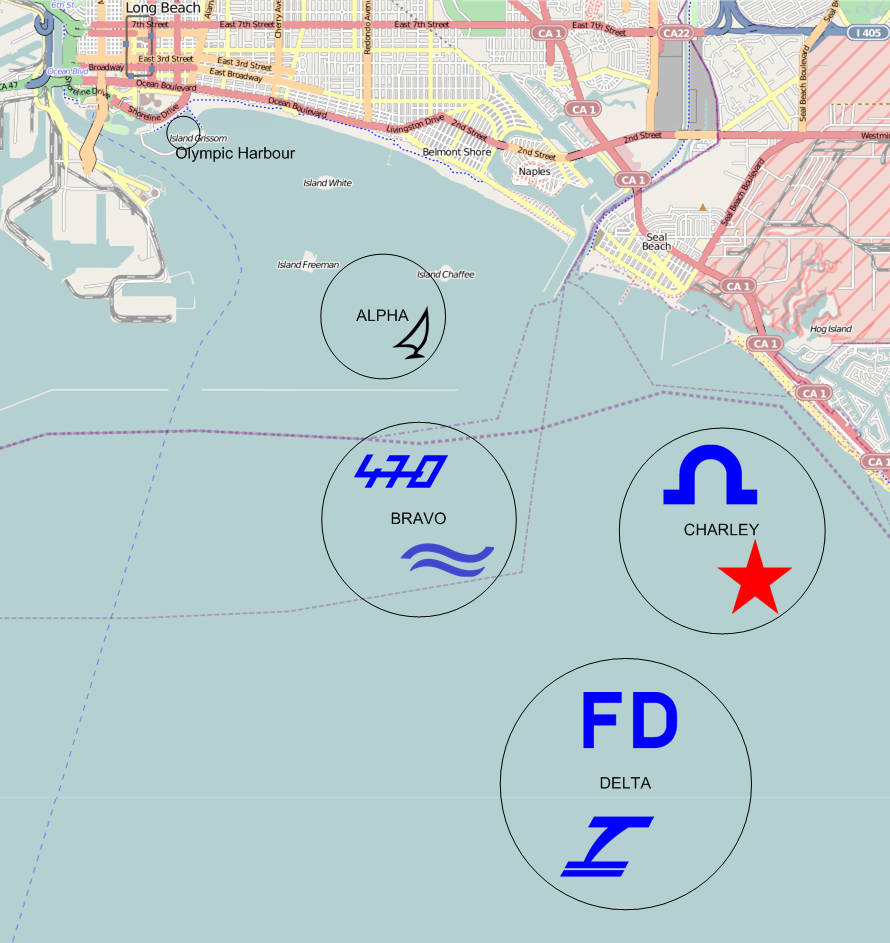
Olympic Course Area's 1984.

According to the IOC statutes the contests in all sport disciplines must be held either in, or as close as possible to the city which the IOC has chosen. The sailing conditions off the coast of Los Angeles are very suitable for Olympic sailing. A total of four race areas were created in the Pacific off the coast of Long Beach.

For the media a number of 40 boats was reserved. All boats were fully booked.

== Competition ==
=== Overview ===
Continents	Countries	Classes	Boats	Male	Female
5	60	7	152	298	2

=== Continents ===
- Africa
- Asia
- Oceania
- Europe
- Americas

=== Countries ===
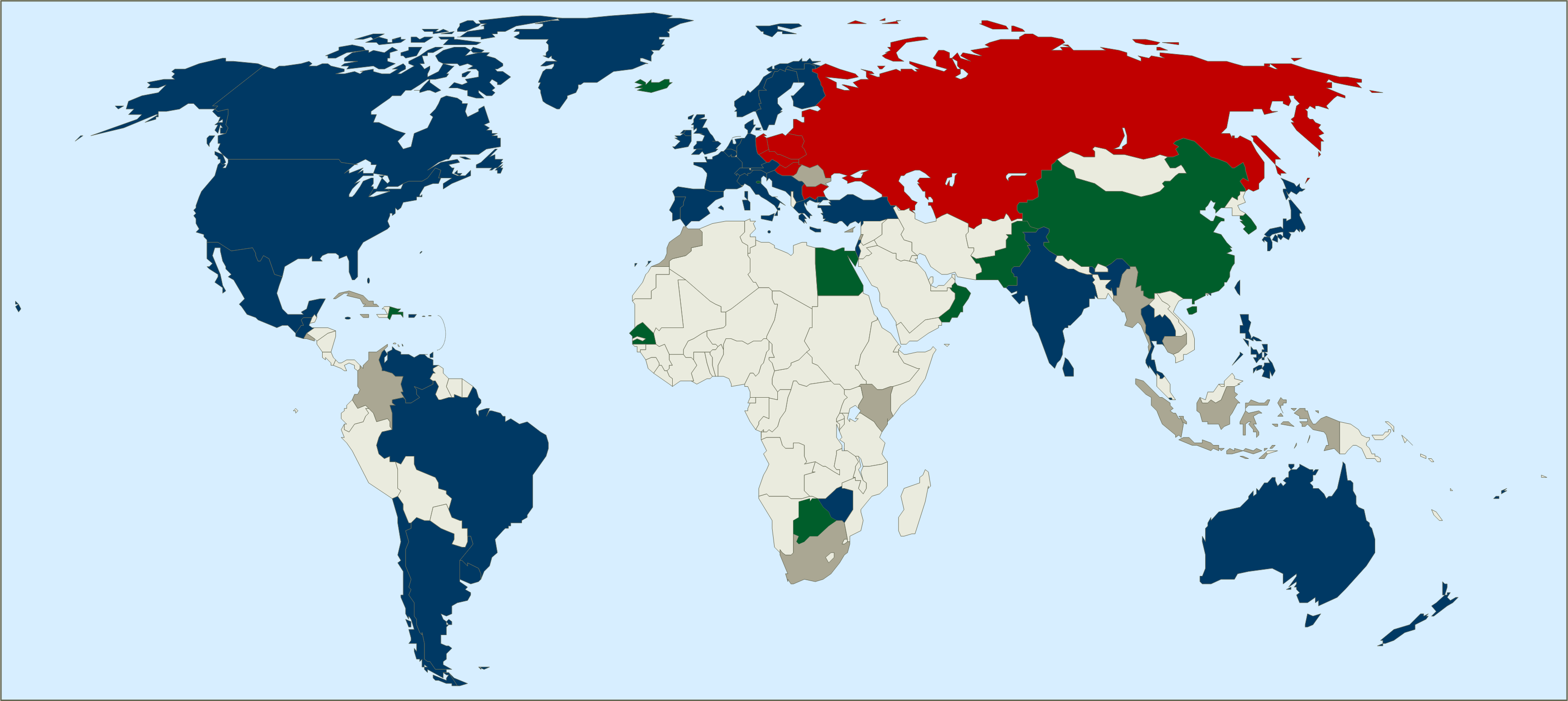
Countries that participated in the Sailing event of the 1984 Olympic Games. Blue: Water Gray: Never participated in OG Dark Gray: Participated in earlier OG Green: Country participated for the first time Dark Blue: Country participated also on previous games Red: Country boycotted the sailing event of the OG

Antigua and Barbuda	Argentina	Australia
Austria	Bahamas	Barbados
Belgium	Bermuda	Botswana
Brazil	Canada	Cayman Islands
Chile	China	Denmark
Dominican Republic	Egypt	Spain
Fiji	Finland	France
West Germany	Great Britain	Greece
Guatemala	Hong Kong	India
Ireland	Iceland	Israel
Virgin Islands	Italy	British Virgin Islands
Japan	South Korea	Mexico
Malta	Netherlands	Norway
New Zealand	Oman	Pakistan
Philippines	Portugal	Puerto Rico
Senegal	Singapore	San Marino
Sri Lanka	Switzerland	Sweden
Thailand	Chinese Taipei	Trinidad and Tobago
Turkey	Uruguay	United States
Venezuela	Yugoslavia	Zimbabwe

=== 1984 Olympic Boycott ===
The Los Angeles boycott by the Soviet Union and its satellites influenced some sailing events. In the Soling the silver and bronze medalists of the 1984 worlds were missing (SR33, Boris Budnikov, Gennadi Strakh and Oleg Miron and DDR4, Helmar Nauck, Norbert Helriegel and Sven Diedering). In the Flying Dutchman the Soviet team of Sergey Borodinov and Vladyslav Akimenko were absent.

=== Classes (equipment) ===
Class	Type	Discipline	Gender	Sailors	Trapeze	Mainsail	Jib/Genoa	Spinnaker	First OG	Olympics so far
Windglider	Surfboard	Fleet	Open	1	0	+	–	–	1984	1
Finn	Dinghy	Fleet	Open	1	0	+	–	–	1952	9
470	Dinghy	Fleet	Open	2	1	+	+	+	1976	3
Flying Dutchman	Dinghy	Fleet	Open	2	1	+	+	+	1960	7
Tornado	Catamaran	Fleet	Open	2	1	+	+	–	1976	3
Star	Keelboat	Fleet	Open	2	0	+	+	–	1932	11
Soling	Keelboat	Fleet	Open	3	0	+	+	+	1972	4

1984 Olympic Classes designs

== Medal summary ==
Games	Gold	Silver	Bronze
1984: Windglider	Netherlands (NED); Stephan van den Berg	United States (USA); Scott Steele	New Zealand (NZL); Bruce Kendall
1984: Finn	New Zealand (NZL); Russell Coutts	United States (USA); John Bertrand	Canada (CAN); Terry Neilson
1984: 470	Spain (ESP); Luis Doreste; Roberto Molina	United States (USA); Steve Benjamin; Chris Steinfeld	France (FRA); Thierry Peponnet; Luc Pillot
1984: Flying Dutchman	United States (USA); Jonathan McKee; William Carl Buchan	Canada (CAN); Terry McLaughlin; Evert Bastet	Great Britain (GBR); Jonathan Richards; Peter Allam
1984: Tornado	New Zealand (NZL); Rex Sellers; Chris Timms	United States (USA); Randy Smyth; Jay Glaser	Australia (AUS); Christopher Cairns; Scott Anderson
1984: Star	United States (USA); William Earl Buchan; Steven Erickson	West Germany (FRG); Joachim Griese; Michael Marcour	Italy (ITA); Giorgio Gorla; Alfio Peraboni
1984: Soling	United States (USA); Robbie Haines; Rod Davis; Ed Trevalyan	Brazil (BRA); Torben Grael; Daniel Adler; Ronaldo Senfft	Canada (CAN); Hans Fogh; Stephen Calder; John Kerr

== Medal table ==
Rank	Nation	Gold	Silver	Bronze	Total
1	United States	3	4	0	7
2	New Zealand	2	0	1	3
3	Netherlands	1	0	0	1
3	Spain	1	0	0	1
5	Canada	0	1	2	3
6	Brazil	0	1	0	1
6	West Germany	0	1	0	1
8	Australia	0	0	1	1
8	France	0	0	1	1
8	Great Britain	0	0	1	1
8	Italy	0	0	1	1
Totals (11 entries)		7	7	7	21

== Remarks ==
=== Demonstration events ===
- The Windglider event was held for men and women. The women's event was the first women-only sailing event in Olympic history. Karen Morch of Canada won the gold medal. In the men's event, the gold medal was won by the Australian Bruce Wylie.

=== Sailors ===
During the sailing regattas at the 1984 Summer Olympics among others the following persons were competing in the various classes:

- Fiji, Tony Philp The youngest competitor:(15 years, 48 days)
- Denmark, Paul Elvstrøm The oldest participant: (56 years, 158 days)
- New Zealand, Russell Coutts
Sailors at the 1984 Olympic Games
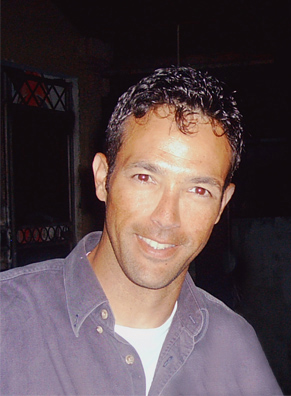
On Windglider:
Tony Philp

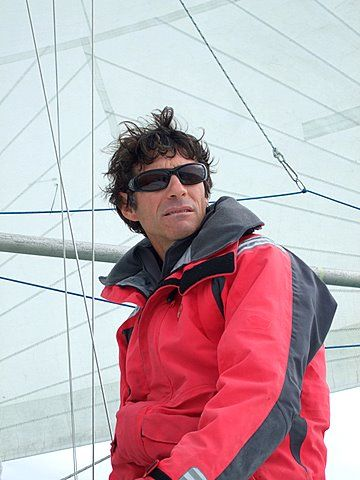
On Windglider:
Bruce Kendall.

== See also ==
- Sailing at the Friendship Games
