= Jay Glaser =

American sailor (born 1953)

Personal information
- Born: July 11, 1953 (age 73) Santa Monica, California, U.S.
- Height: 5 ft 10 in (178 cm)
- Weight: 150 lb (70 kg)

Sailing career
- Sport: Sailing
- Club: Newport Harbor Yacht Club
- Classes: Tornado, Formula 18, A-Catamaran, Formula 16
Medal record
Men's sailing
Representing the United States
Olympic Games
Silver medal – second place	1984 Los Angeles	Tornado

Jay Glaser (born July 11, 1953) is an American competitive sailor and Olympic silver medalist. He was born in Santa Monica, California.

== Career ==
At the 1984 Summer Olympics, Glaser finished in 2nd place in the Tornado class along with his partner, Randy Smyth.
