= Nahid Gäbler =

German sailor

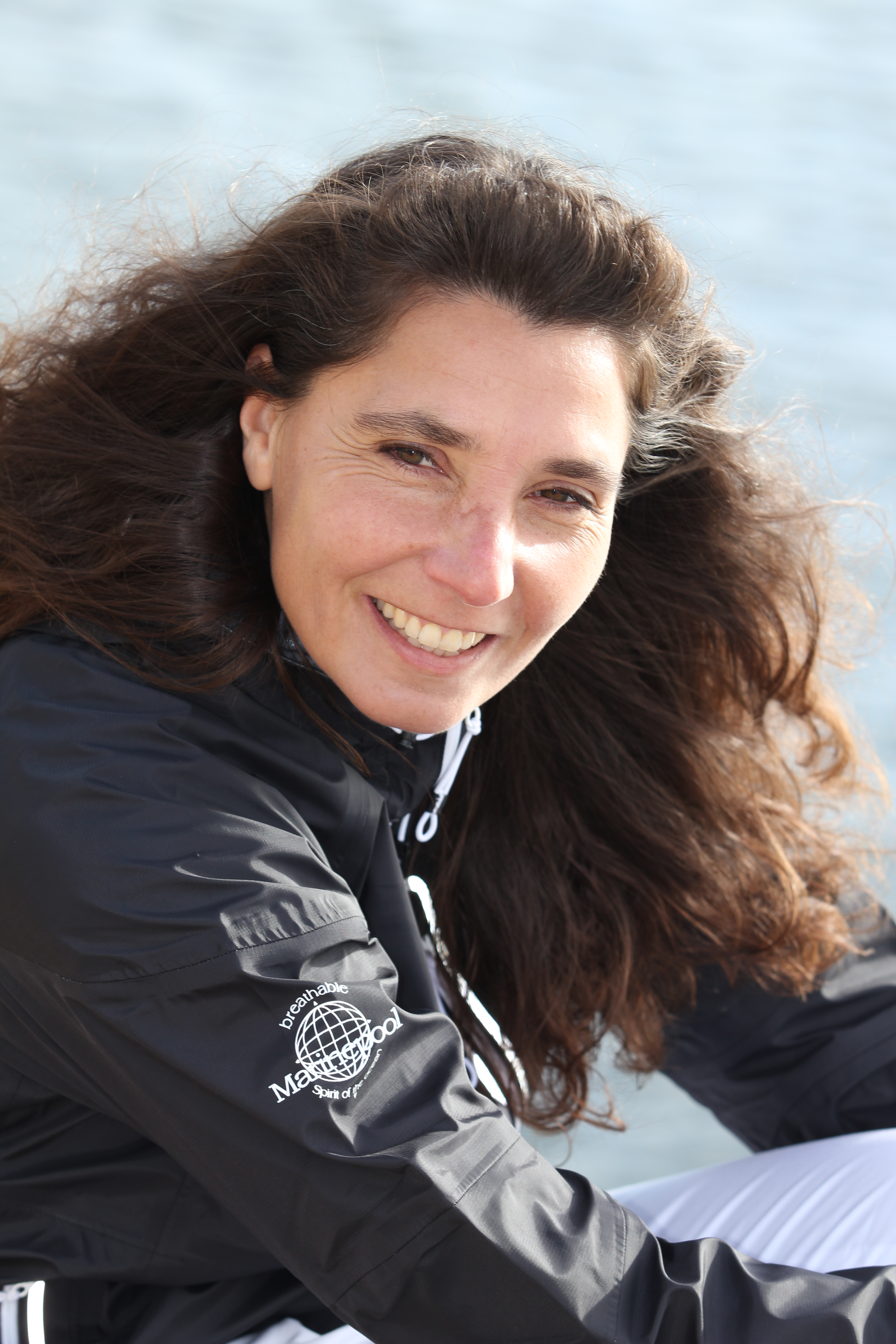

Personal information
- Born: 1967 (age 58–59) Kolding, Denmark

Sport
- Sport: Sailing

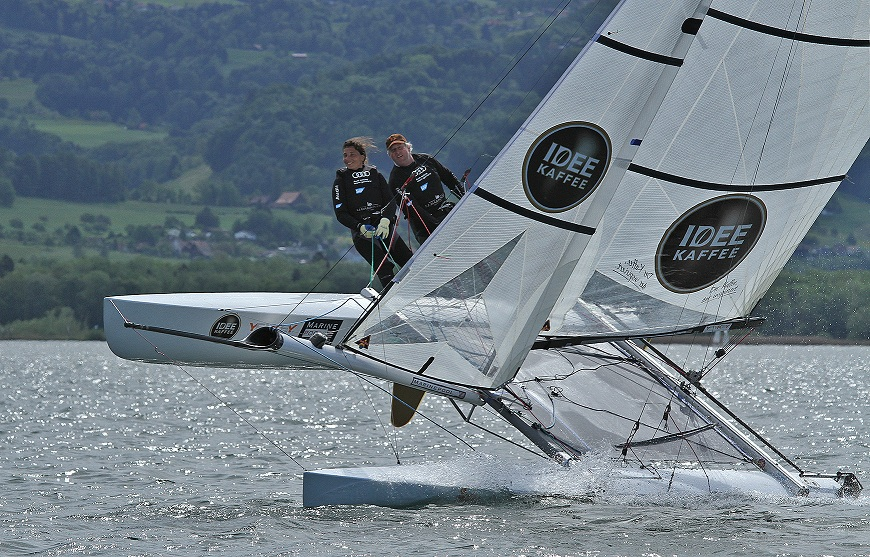
Tornado European Champions 2013

Nahid Gäbler (born 1967 in Kolding, Denmark) is a Tornado World and European champion and multiple mixed Tornado World and European champion sailor.

== Early life and water sports ==
Since the age of six, Gäbler has been a dedicated dressage and show-jumping rider, as well as a warmblood horse breeder. In swimming, she became a Danish champion (DGI-Landsmester) in short-distance 50-metre freestyle swimming and a vice-champion in 100-metre backstroke swimming. She continued competing in masters events and won gold at the 2018 Danish DOM-L Masters Championship in the 100-metre backstroke and the 50-metre and 100-metre freestyle.

== Sailing career ==
From 2005 to 2008, Gäbler worked as a sailing coach for Roland Gaebler and Gunnar Struckmann during their final Olympic campaign in the 2008 Tornado class. In May 2009, she and Gaebler began sailing the Tornado class together, forming "Team Gäbler" and campaigning to return the multihull and Tornado to the Olympic program.

In 2011, she served as a tactician for Team Extreme with Gaebler on their Extreme 40 during the Extreme Sailing Series events in Cowes and Almería. In 2013, she and Gaebler joined Sailing Team Germany as part of the national Olympic team for the Nacra 17 class. In the new Olympic Nacra 17 mixed catamaran class, Nahid and Allan Nørregaard finished 27th overall (2nd in the silver fleet) at the 2013 World Championship in The Hague.

== Competitions and major titles ==
- Tornado German Open Champion in 2009, 2011, 2014, 2015 and in 2016.
- Tornado German Open Mixed Champion in 2010-2011, 2013-2015.
- Open Tornado European Champion in 2013 and 2015.
- Open Tornado Vice European Champion: 2010, 2011, 2012, 2014.
- Tornado Mixed European Champion in 2010, 2011, 2012, 2013, 2014 and in 2015.
- Open Tornado World Champion in 2010 in Travemünde, Germany. Nahid and Roland Gaebler become the first mix team to win a World Championship on a catamaran, Nahid was the first woman in history to win a World Championship on a catamaran.
- Open Tornado Vice World Champion in 2011, 2012, 2013 and 2015.
- Open Tornado 3. place World Championship in 2014.
- Tornado Mixed Global Champion in 2010, 2011, 2012, 2013, 2014 and 2015.
- Hurricane 5.9 British Champion 2013 and Best Mix Team 2013 together with skipper John Ready in Weymouth, Great Britain.
- Euro-Cup Tornado Winner: 2015.
- Kiel Week Tornado Winner: 2012 in the Audi Sailing Arena, Kiel, Germany.
- Travemünder Week in Tornado in Travemünde, Germany in 2009, 2010 and 2012.
- Blue Ribbon of Round Fehmarn Winner: 2010.
- Blue Ribbon race (Gorla under 30 ft) Winner: 2011 competing on the Ventilo M2 (28 foot catamaran) as mainsail trimmer and tactician alongside boat owner Rolf Hufnagel.
- Kékszalag (Blue Ribbon Race) 7th Place Overall: 2015 on lake Balaton, Hungary, aboard Rolf Hufnagel's Ventilo M2 catamaran.
