= John Osborn (sailor) =

British sailor

Personal information
- Nationality: British
- Born: 8 September 1945 (age 81)

Sport
- Sport: Sailing
Medal record
Men's sailing
Representing United Kingdom
Olympic Games
Gold medal – first place	1976 Montreal	Tornado

John Osborn (born 18 September 1945) is a British sailor, Olympic champion and world champion. He won a gold medal in the Tornado class with Reg White at the 1976 Summer Olympics in Montreal.

He became world champion in the tornado class in 1976, with Reg White.
