= Jörg Spengler =

German sailor

Medal record

Sailing

Representing West Germany

Olympic Games
Bronze medal – third place	1976 Montreal	Tornado

Jörg Spengler (23 December 1938 – 26 November 2013) was a German sailor. He won a bronze medal in the Tornado class with Jörg Schmall at the 1976 Summer Olympics in Montreal.
