= Jörg Schmall =

German sailor (born 1943)

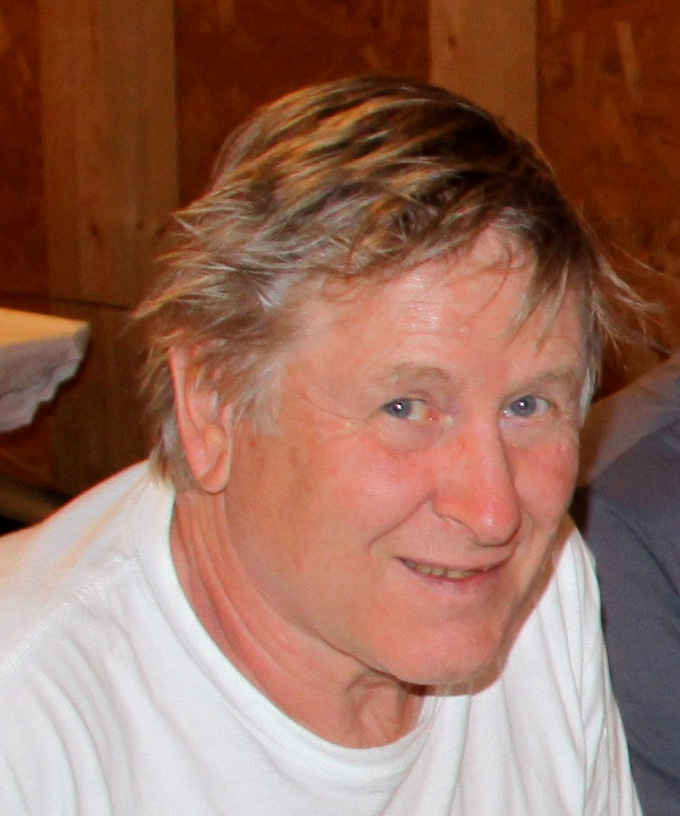

Medal record

Sailing

Representing West Germany

Olympic Games
Bronze medal – third place	1976 Montreal	Tornado

Jörg Schmall (born 27 January 1943) is a German sailor. He won a bronze medal in the Tornado class with Jörg Spengler at the 1976 Summer Olympics in Montreal.
