= Huub Lambriex =

Dutch sailor (born 1960)

Personal information
- Full name: Hubertus Lambriex
- Nationality: Dutch
- Born: 27 February 1960 (age 66) Bussum
- Height: 1.96 m (6.4 ft)

Sailing career
- Sport: Sailing
- Class: Tornado
- Updated on 2014-01-10

Hubertus "Huub" Lambriex (born 27 February 1960 in Bussum) is a sailor from the Netherlands, who represented his country at the 1984 Summer Olympics in Los Angeles. With Willy van Bladel as helmsman, Lambriex took the 11th place in the Tornado.

== Professional life ==
Lambriex studied at the Nyenrode University (1978–1982). After the Olympics Lambriex and Guido Alkemade started their own company, (1984) in yacht equipment, LA84, specialized in ropes. Lambriex left the company in 2001. Nowadays Lambriex is partner at Mentalent (2005 – Present) and CCO at Enzyscreen (2010 – Present).

== Sources ==
- "Huub Lambriex Bio, Stats, and Results". Olympic Sports. Sports-Reference.com. Archived from the original on 2013-12-19.
- "Oranje équipe met 207 personen op de Zomerspelen". Dagblad De Telegraaf (in Dutch). 1984-07-11.
- "Toppers bijeen in Hyeres Olympisch zeilexamen". Dagblad De Telegraaf (in Dutch). 1984-04-19.
- "Aspiraties". Dagblad De Telegraaf (in Dutch). 1984-04-30.
- "Verwachtingen voor Los Angeles hoog gespannen Gouden kansen voor olympische zeilptoeg". Dagblad De Telegraaf (in Dutch). 1984-07-28.
- "Zeilcoach rekent op een medaille". Dagblad De Telegraaf (in Dutch). 1984-07-31.
- "Zeilers smeken om meer wind". Dagblad De Telegraaf (in Dutch). 1984-08-03.
- "Zeilers verspelen kansen op medaille Tijdperk 'Vliegende Hollanders' voorbij". Dagblad De Telegraaf (in Dutch). 1984-08-08.
- "Surfgoud kan impuls geven Watersport wacht op frisse wind". Dagblad De Telegraaf (in Dutch). 1984-08-11.
- Official Report Los Angeles 1984, Volume 1: Organization and Planning (part 1) (PDF). Los Angeles: Los Angeles Olympic Organizing Committee. 1985. Archived from the original (PDF) on January 28, 2015.
- Official Report Los Angeles 1984, Volume 1: Organization and Planning (part 2) (PDF). Los Angeles: Los Angeles Olympic Organizing Committee. 1985. Archived from the original (PDF) on October 17, 2013.
- Official Report Los Angeles 1984, Volume 1: Organization and Planning (part 3) (PDF). Los Angeles: Los Angeles Olympic Organizing Committee. 1985. Archived from the original (PDF) on October 17, 2013.
- Official Report Los Angeles 1984, Volume 2: Competition and Summary and Results (part 1) (PDF). Los Angeles: Los Angeles Olympic Organizing Committee. 1985. Archived from the original (PDF) on October 17, 2013.
- Official Report Los Angeles 1984, Volume 2: Competition and Summary and Results (part 2) (PDF). Los Angeles: Los Angeles Olympic Organizing Committee. 1985. Archived from the original (PDF) on October 7, 2013.
- Official Report Los Angeles 1984, Volume 2: Competition and Summary and Results (part 3) (PDF). Los Angeles: Los Angeles Olympic Organizing Committee. 1985. Archived from the original (PDF) on October 17, 2013.
- "Huub Lambriex". www.linkedin.com.
- "enzyscreen". www.enzyscreen.com.
