= Sergey Kravtsov (sailor) =

Belarusian sailor

Personal information
- Born: 17 February 1960 (age 66) Minsk, Belarus
- Height: 1.72 m (5 ft 8 in)
- Weight: 75 kg (165 lb)

Sport
- Sport: Sailing
- Club: SK VS Minsk

Sergey Mikhaylovich Kravtsov (Russian: Серге́й Михайлович Кравцов; born 17 February 1960) is a retired Belarusian sailor. He competed in the mixed multihull (Tornado) event at the 1988, 1992 and 1996 Summer Olympics, for the Soviet Union, Unified Team and Belarus, finishing in seventh, ninth and fourteenth place, respectively.
