= Extreme 40 =

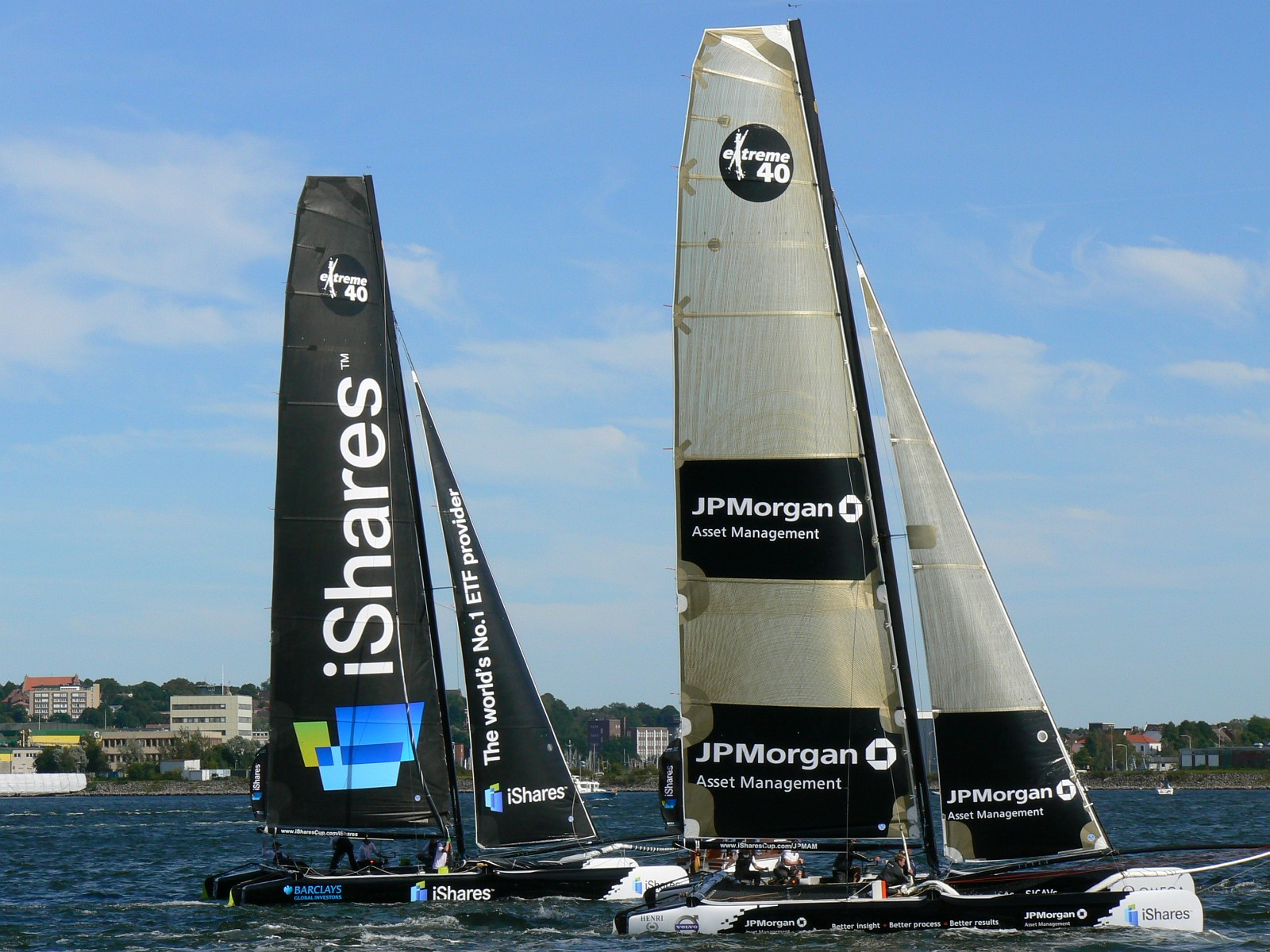
- Extreme 40 catamarans at the 2008 iShares Cup in Kiel.

Development
- Designer: Yves Loday

Hull
- LOA: 12 m (40 ft)
- Beam: 7.0 m (23 ft)

Rig
- Rig type: Sloop
- Mast height: 19 m (62 ft)

Sails
- Mainsail area: 75 m^{2} (810 sq ft)
- Jib/genoa area: 25 m^{2} (270 sq ft)
- Gennaker area: 110 m^{2} (1,200 sq ft)

The Extreme 40 is a class of sailing catamaran created by TornadoSport and designed by Yves Loday. The boats are 40 feet long and are constructed out of carbon fibre. They have a top speed of about 40 knots (74 km/h; 46 mph) and can sail at about 35 knots (65 km/h; 40 mph) in 20–25 knots of wind The first extreme 40 was launched in 2005. They were sailed in the Extreme Sailing Series, formerly known as the iShares Cup. Extreme 40s are essentially a scaled-up version of the Tornado sailboat used in The Olympics.

Extreme 40s are 12 metres (40 ft) long, have a 7.0 metres (23 ft) beam, displace 1,250 kilograms (2,760 lb) of water, have a mast height of 19 metres (62 ft) and a claimed top speed of 40 knots (74 km/h; 46 mph). The mainsail is 75 square metres (810 sq ft) and the jib is 25 square metres (270 sq ft). The gennaker used for downwind sailing is 110 square metres (1,200 sq ft).
