= Peter Due =

Danish sailor

Medal record

Men's sailing

Representing Denmark

Olympic Games
Silver medal – second place	1980 Moscow	Tornado

Peter Due (born 22 September 1947) is a Danish competitive sailor and Olympic medalist. He won a silver medal in the Tornado class at the 1980 Summer Olympics in Moscow along with Per Kjærgaard Nielsen.
