= Per Kjærgaard Nielsen =

Danish sailor (born 1955)

Medal record

Representing Denmark

Men's sailing

Olympic Games
Silver medal – second place	1980 Moscow	Tornado

Per Kjærgaard Nielsen (31 January 1955) is a Danish sailor and Olympic medalist. He won a silver medal in the Tornado class at the 1980 Summer Olympics in Moscow along with Peter Due.
