= Keith Notary =

American sailor (born 1960)

Personal information
- Full name: Keith Ireland Notary
- Born: January 22, 1960 (age 66) Merritt Island, Florida, U.S.
Medal record
Men's sailing
Representing the United States
Olympic Games
Silver medal – second place	1992 Barcelona	Tornado

Keith Ireland Notary (born January 22, 1960) is an American former competitive sailor and Olympic silver medalist. He was born in Merritt Island, Florida.

== Career ==
At the 1992 Summer Olympics, Notary finished in 2nd place in the tornado along with his partner Randy Smyth.
