= Randy Smyth =

American sailor (born 1954)

Personal information
- Full name: Randolph L. Smyth
- Born: July 7, 1954 (age 72) Pasadena, California, U.S.
Medal record
Men's sailing
Representing the United States
Olympic Games
| Silver medal – second place | 1984 Los Angeles | Tornado |
| Silver medal – second place | 1992 Barcelona | Tornado |

Randolph L. Smyth (born July 7, 1954) is an American competitive sailor and two-time Olympic silver medalist. He is a multihull specialist, who won two Olympic silver medals racing catamarans, and has won innumerable national and world titles skippering multihulls. In a 2003 profile on him in Sailing World magazine he was described as America's greatest multihull sailor. He was born in Pasadena, California.

== Career ==
At the 1984 Summer Olympics, Smyth finished in 2nd place in the tornado along with his partner Jay Glaser.

He sailed for Stars & Stripes when they defended the 1988 America's Cup.

At the 1992 Summer Olympics, Smyth finished in 2nd place in the tornado along with his partner Keith Notary.

He is a six time Winner of the Worrell 1000. a 1000-mile race up the east coast of the US from Ft. Lauderdale to North Carolina, run in 12 or more stages. The race, contested on beach cats from 16 to 20 feet over the years, requires contestants to sail off the beach, through the surf, and back on the beach at the conclusion of each days sailing. Smyth won the event in 1985, 1989, 1997, 1998, 1999, and 2000. The race has been run 14 times since its inception in 1976, with a different make and model and formula classes used in different years. In 2022 Smyth again competed in the Worrell 1000, under the Team Rudee's banner and won several early legs of the competition.

Smyth has competed multiple times for the Hobie Alter Cup, a competition designed to determine the U.S. national multihull champion, and organized by US Sailing, the sports federation that oversees amateur and Olympic sailing in the United States. The contest has been held annually since 1987. The race is typically contested on "one design", with a rotating list of makes and models being used each year, including numerous models of Hobie Cat, Nacra and Prindle beach cats. Smyth has won the Trophy 5 times, in 1990, 1993, 1995, 1998, and in 2018 at age 64 on the Weta trimaran, the first time a trimaran was the boat used in the tournament.

Smyth also served as a sailing consultant and skipper for the Hollywood movies "Water World" starring Kevin Costner and "The Thomas Crowne Affair" starring Pierce Bronson. Both movies featured maxi-multihull sailboats of over 60 feet length, which are extremely high-performance boats that require an experienced helmsman to safely sail.

He is currently involved in interesting new multihull projects utilizing hydrofoils. The most recent is 53 feet long and build in Rhode Island.

Smyth was inducted into the National Sailing Hall of Fame in 2017.
