= Andreas Hagara =

Austrian yacht racer

Personal information
- Born: 19 May 1964 (age 62) Vienna, Austria

Sailing career
- Sport: Sailing
Medal record
Sailing
Representing Austria
Event	1st	2nd	3rd
World Championships	1	1	1
European Championships	3	4	1
World Championships
Gold medal – first place	1987 Kiel	Tornado
Silver medal – second place	1999 Vallensbæk	Tornado
Bronze medal – third place	1990 Medemblik	Tornado
European Championships
Gold medal – first place	1990 Breitenbrunn	Tornado
Gold medal – first place	1996 Attersee	Tornado
Gold medal – first place	2003 Cagliari	Tornado
Silver medal – second place	1993 Helsinki	Tornado
Silver medal – second place	1995 Kiel	Tornado
Silver medal – second place	1998 Porto Carras	Tornado
Silver medal – second place	1999 Port de Pollença	Tornado
Bronze medal – third place	2000 Alassio	Tornado

Andreas Hagara (born 19 May 1964) is an Austrian yacht racer who competed in the 1992 Summer Olympics and in the 1996 Summer Olympics. His brother also sailed, Roman Hagara.
