= Leigh McMillan =

British sailor

Medal record

Sailing

Representing Great Britain

World Championships
Silver medal – second place	2003 Cádiz	Tornado
Silver medal – second place	2005 La Rochelle	Tornado

Leigh McMillan (born 24 October 1980) is a British sailor who competed in the 2004 and 2008 Summer Olympics.

McMillan has skippered The Wave, Muscat since the 2011 Extreme Sailing Series.

In 2015, it was announced that McMillan was set to be the backup helm on Land Rover BAR, the British challenger for the 35th America's Cup in 2017.
