= José Luis Ballester (sailor) =

Spanish sailor (born 1968)

Personal information
- Full name: José Luis Ballester Tuliesa
- Nickname: Pepote
- Born: 17 August 1968 (age 57) Vinaroz
- Height: 173 cm (5 ft 8 in)
- Weight: 72 kg (159 lb)

Sailing career
- Sport: Sailing
- Club: Náutico Pto. Pollensa
- Class: Tornado
Medal record
Men's sailing
Representing Spain
Olympic Games
Gold medal – first place	1996 Atlanta	Tornado

José Luis Ballester Tuliesa (Note: In this Spanish name, the first or paternal surname is Ballester and the second or maternal family name is Tuliesa.) (born 17 August 1968) is a Spanish sailor and Olympic champion. He competed at the 1996 Summer Olympics in Atlanta and won a gold medal in the Tornado class.
