= Luca Santella =

Italian sailor

Luca Santella has been part of the Italian sailing team from 1978 to 1994. He participated in two Olympic Games, Seoul (1988) and Barcelona (1992) respectively with the Tornado Class and Flying Dutchman Class. He won 10 Italian titles in different classes such as 470-Tornado-Flying Dutchman-Soling-J24 and three European Championship still on Melges24-J24 and Flying Dutchman (ref. Federazione italiana Vela). He graduated in architecture at Florence University with max of degree. (La Nazione- Il Tirreno- Università degli studi di Firenze). He is now CEO of the yard Bluegame, which he founded, fitting and delivering walkaround yachts from 40' to 60' feet. (Nautica-Yacht Capital-Boat International-Yacht Design)
