= Iordanis Paschalidis =

Greek yacht racer

Iordanis Paschalidis (born 1 February 1967) is a Greek yacht racer who competed in the 2004 Summer Olympics and in the 2008 Summer Olympics.
