= Willy van Bladel =

Dutch sailor (born 1960)

Personal information
- Full name: Wilhelmus Christiaan Franciscus van Bladel
- Nickname: Wil
- Born: 26 March 1960 (age 66) Eindhoven, Netherlands
- Height: 1.76 m (5.8 ft)

Sailing career
- Sport: Sailing
- Classes: 470; Tornado
Competition record
Sailing
Representing Netherlands
Olympic Games
	1984 Long Beach	Tornado
9th	1988 Pusan	Tornado
- Updated on 2014-01-31

Wilhelmus Christiaan Franciscus "Willy" van Bladel (born 26 March 1960 in Eindhoven) is a sailor from the Netherlands, who represented his country at the 1984 Summer Olympics in Los Angeles. With Huub Lambriex as crew, Van Bladel took the 11th place in the Tornado. At the 1988 Olympics in Pusan Van Bladel made his second appearance in the Olympic regattas with his brother Cees van Bladel as crew. They took 9th place.

== Professional life ==
Van Bladel studied BBA, Business Administration at the Nyenrode University (1978–1981). He nowadays is owner of the company Hoblad b.v..

Since 2007, Wil is head coach of the Flemish Olympic team (VYF). He is the primary coach of Evi Van Acker.

== Sources ==
- Evans, Hilary; Gjerde, Arild; Heijmans, Jeroen; Mallon, Bill; et al. "Willy van Bladel Bio, Stats, and Results". Olympics at Sports-Reference.com. Sports Reference LLC. Archived from the original on 2020-04-18.
- "Oranje équipe met 207 personen op de Zomerspelen". Dagblad De Telegraaf (in Dutch). 1984-07-11.
- "Toppers bijeen in Hyeres Olympisch zeilexamen". Dagblad De Telegraaf (in Dutch). 1984-04-19.
- "Aspiraties". Dagblad De Telegraaf (in Dutch). 1984-04-30.
- "Verwachtingen voor Los Angeles hoog gespannen Gouden kansen voor olympische zeilptoeg". Dagblad De Telegraaf (in Dutch). 1984-07-28.
- "Zeilcoach rekent op een medaille". Dagblad De Telegraaf (in Dutch). 1984-07-31.
- "Zeilers smeken om meer wind". Dagblad De Telegraaf (in Dutch). 1984-08-03.
- "Zeilers verspelen kansen op medaille Tijdperk 'Vliegende Hollanders' voorbij". Dagblad De Telegraaf (in Dutch). 1984-08-08.
- "Surfgoud kan impuls geven Watersport wacht op frisse wind". Dagblad De Telegraaf (in Dutch). 1984-08-11.
- Official Report Los Angeles 1984, Volume 1: Organization and Planning (part 1) (PDF). Los Angeles: Los Angeles Olympic Organizing Committee. 1985. Archived from the original (PDF) on January 28, 2015.
- Official Report Los Angeles 1984, Volume 1: Organization and Planning (part 2) (PDF). Los Angeles: Los Angeles Olympic Organizing Committee. 1985. Archived from the original (PDF) on October 17, 2013.
- Official Report Los Angeles 1984, Volume 1: Organization and Planning (part 3) (PDF). Los Angeles: Los Angeles Olympic Organizing Committee. 1985. Archived from the original (PDF) on October 17, 2013.
- Official Report Los Angeles 1984, Volume 2: Competition and Summary and Results (part 1) (PDF). Los Angeles: Los Angeles Olympic Organizing Committee. 1985. Archived from the original (PDF) on October 17, 2013.
- Official Report Los Angeles 1984, Volume 2: Competition and Summary and Results (part 2) (PDF). Los Angeles: Los Angeles Olympic Organizing Committee. 1985. Archived from the original (PDF) on October 7, 2013.
- Official Report Los Angeles 1984, Volume 2: Competition and Summary and Results (part 3) (PDF). Los Angeles: Los Angeles Olympic Organizing Committee. 1985. Archived from the original (PDF) on October 17, 2013.
- "De Nederlandse olympische zeilploeg". De Telegraaf (in Dutch). 1988-09-10.
- "Nederlandse zeilploeg met lege handen naar huis". De Telegraaf (in Dutch). 1988-09-28.
- Official Report, Volume 1: Organization and Planning (PDF). Seoul: Olympic Organizing Committee. 1989. Archived from the original (PDF) on March 4, 2016.
- Official Report, Volume 2: Competition, Summary and Results (PDF). Seoul: Seoul Olympic Organizing Committee. 1989. Archived from the original (PDF) on October 7, 2013.
- "Wil van Bladel". www.linkedin.com.
