= Viktor Potapov =

Soviet sailor

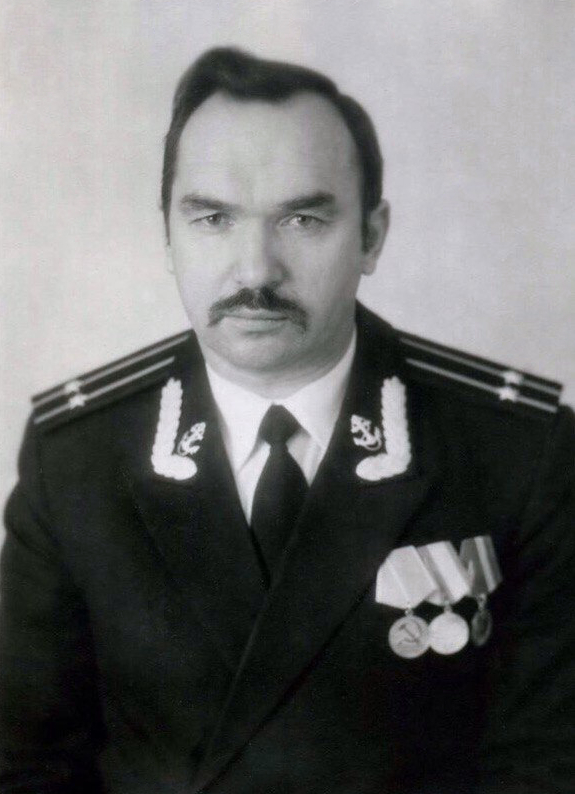

Personal information
- Full name: Viktor Yakovlevich Potapov
- Born: Виктор Яковлевич Потапов; 29 March 1947 Dolgoprudny, Moscow Oblast, RSFSR, USSR
- Died: 10 December 2017 (aged 70) Dolgoprudny, Moscow Oblast, Russia

Sailing career
- Sport: Sailing
- Class: Finn class
Competition record
Representing Soviet Union
Olympic Games
Bronze medal – third place	1972 Munich	Finn class

Viktor Yakovlevich Potapov (Russian: Виктор Яковлевич Потапов; 29 March 1947 – 10 December 2017) was a Soviet and Russian sailor. He won a bronze medal in the Finn class at the 1972 Summer Olympics.

He died in Dolgoprudny as a result of an automobile accident on 10 December 2017.

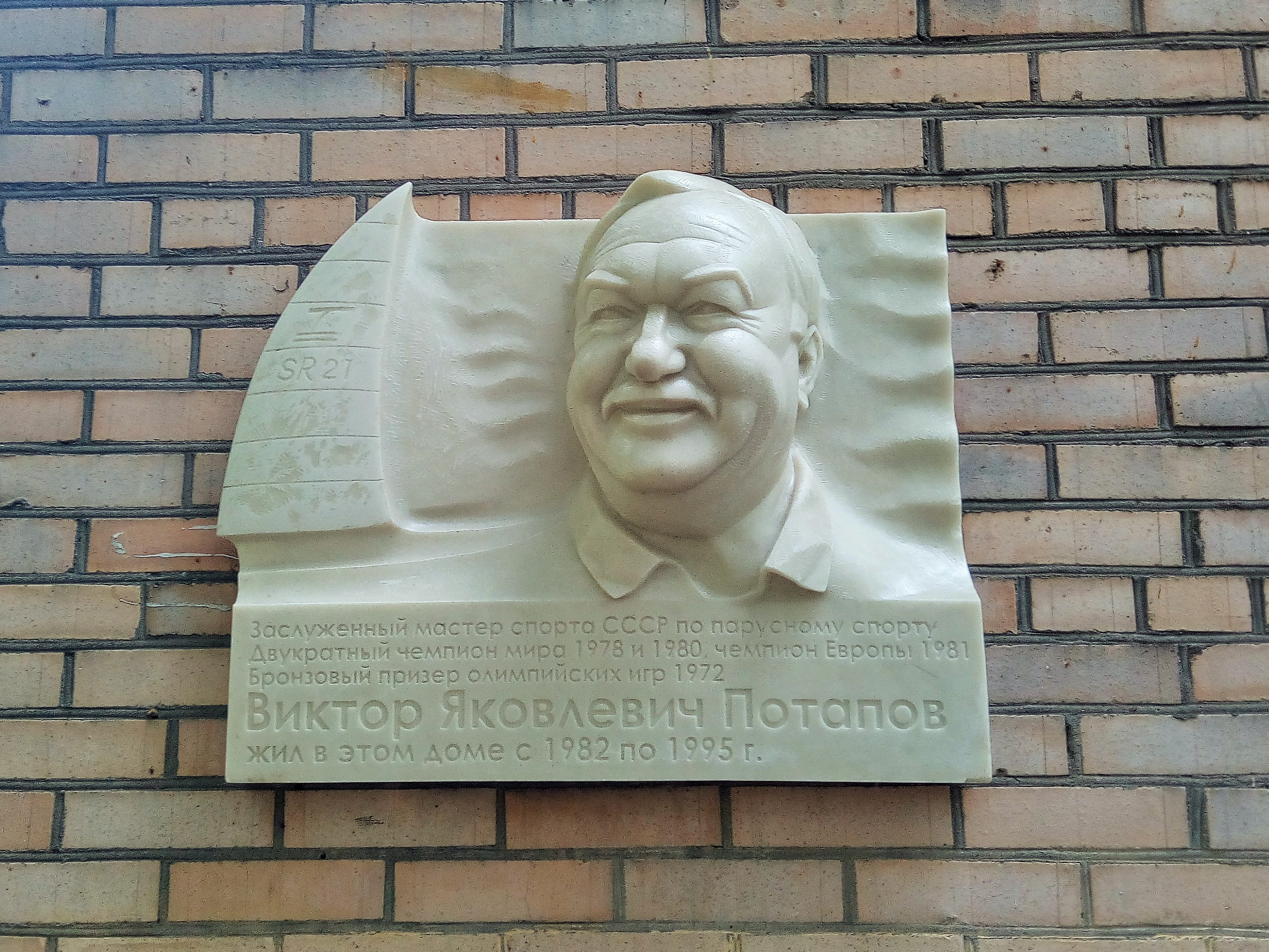
Memorial plaque to Viktor Potapov in Dolgoprudny
