= Brian Lewis (sailor) =

Australian sailor

Personal information
- Nationality: Australian
- Born: 24 March 1942 (age 82)

Sport
- Sport: Sailing

Brian Lewis (born 24 March 1942) is an Australian former sailor. He competed in the Tornado event at the 1976 Summer Olympics.
