= Konstantinos Trigkonis =

Greek yacht racer

Konstantinos Trigkonis (Greek: Κωνσταντίνος Τριγκώνης; born 2 July 1970) is a Greek yacht racer. He competed in the 1996, 2000, 2004, and 2008 Summer Olympics.
