= Hugh Styles =

British sailor

Personal information
- Nationality: British
- Born: 25 June 1974 (age 50); Dover, England

Sport
- Sport: Sailing

Hugh Styles (born 25 June 1974) is a British sailor. Between 1985 and 1991, Styles was educated at Dover Grammar School for Boys. He competed in the Tornado event at the 2000 Summer Olympics.
