= Nicolas Hénard =

French sailor

Medal record

Men's sailing

Representing France

Olympic Games
Gold medal – first place	1988 Seoul	Tornado
Gold medal – first place	1992 Barcelona	Tornado

Nicolas Hénard (born 16 September 1964) is a French sailor. He is a double Olympic gold medal winner. First in the 1988 Summer Olympics in Seoul, South Korea, winning the Tornado class with Jean-Yves Le Déroff. Second in the 1992 Summer Olympics in Barcelona, winning the Tornado class with Yves Loday.
