= Trine Elvstrøm-Myralf =

Danish sailor

Personal information
- Nationality: Danish
- Born: 6 March 1962 (age 63); Gentofte, Denmark

Sport
- Sport: Sailing

Trine Elvstrøm-Myralf (born 6 March 1962) is a Danish sailor. She competed at the 1984 Summer Olympics and the 1988 Summer Olympics.
