= Frank Parlow =

German yacht racer (born 1967)

Frank Parlow (born 22 April 1967) is a German former yacht racer who competed in the 1992 Summer Olympics and in the 1996 Summer Olympics.
