= Yury Konovalov (sailor) =

Russian sailor

Personal information
- Nationality: Russian
- Born: 23 September 1961 (age 65)

Sport
- Sport: Sailing

Yury Konovalov (born 23 September 1961) is a Russian sailor. He competed at the 1988 Summer Olympics, the 1992 Summer Olympics, and the 1996 Summer Olympics.
