= Frédéric le Peutrec =

French sailor

Personal information
- Nationality: French
- Born: 20 June 1965 (age 59); Paris, France

Sport
- Sport: Sailing

Frédéric le Peutrec (born 20 June 1965) is a French sailor. He competed in the Tornado event at the 1996 Summer Olympics.
