= Jeremy Newman (sailor) =

British sailor

Personal information
- Nationality: British
- Born: 16 February 1961 (age 65) Colchester, England

Sport
- Sport: Sailing

Jeremy Newman (born 16 February 1961) is a British sailor. He competed in the Tornado event at the 1988 Summer Olympics.
