= Laurent Voiron =

French sailor

Personal information
- Nationality: French
- Born: 18 June 1975 (age 49); Chambéry, France

Sport
- Sport: Sailing

Laurent Voiron (born 18 June 1975) is a French sailor. He competed in the Tornado event at the 2004 Summer Olympics.
