= Warren Rock =

Australian sailor

Personal information
- Nationality: Australian
- Born: 17 March 1942 (age 84)

Sport
- Sport: Sailing

Warren Rock (born 17 March 1942) is an Australian sailor. He competed in the Tornado event at the 1976 Summer Olympics.
