= Chris Timms =

New Zealand sailor

Medal record

Men's sailing

Representing New Zealand

Olympic Games
Gold medal – first place	1984 Los Angeles	Tornado
Silver medal – second place	1988 Seoul	Tornado

Christopher Ian Timms (24 March 1947 – 19 March 2004) was a yachtsman from New Zealand. He won a gold medal at the 1984 Summer Olympics in Los Angeles, and a silver medal at the 1988 Summer Olympics in Seoul. Timms died in 2004 when the aircraft he was flying in crashed into the Firth of Thames.
