= Adam May (sailor) =

British competitive sailor (born 1976)

Personal information
- Nationality: British
- Born: 6 July 1976 (age 50)
- Height: 180 cm (5 ft 11 in)
- Weight: 69 kg (152 lb)

Sport
- Sport: Sailing

Adam May (born 6 July 1976) is a British sailor. He competed in the Tornado event at the 2000 Summer Olympics.
