= René Schwall =

German sailor

Personal information
- Nationality: German
- Born: January 28, 1971 (age 55) Kiel, Schlewig-Holstein, West Germany
- Height: 183 cm (6 ft 0 in)
- Weight: 73 kg (161 lb)

Sport
- Country: Germany
- Sport: Sailing
- Club: Kiler Yacht-Club
Medal record
Representing Germany
Men's Sailing
Olympic Games
Bronze medal – third place	2000 Sydney	Tornado class
- Updated on 5 August 2015

René Schwall (born 29 January 1971) is a German sailor. He competed in the 2000 Summer Olympics. In the Tornado World Championship, which are organized by the International Sailing Federation, Schwall has won three gold medals, ranking him as a world champion during 1993, 1997, and 2000. He has also been awarded two silver and two bronze medals for other years in the Championships. He is currently ranked as the fourth most awarded Tornado medalist in open sailing. Schwall was born in the German town of Kiel, where the first Tornado World Championship were held since 1968, three years before his birth.
