= Marco Pirinoli =

Italian yacht racer

Personal information
- Full name: Marco Sergio Luciano Pirinoli
- Nationality: French and Italian
- Born: 24 October 1966 (age 59) Tassin-la-Demi-Lune, France

Sailing career
- Sport: Sailing
Medal record
Sailing
Representing Italy
World Championships
Gold medal – first place	1982 Monfalcone	Europe

Marco Pirinoli (born 24 October 1966) is an Italian former sailor who competed in the 1996 Summer Olympics. His brother was also a sailor, Walter Pirinoli.
