= Angelo Glisoni =

Italian yacht racer

Angelo Glisoni (born 20 June 1957) is an Italian former yacht racer who competed in the 1992 Summer Olympics.
