= Jean-Yves Le Déroff =

French sailor

Medal record

Men's sailing

Representing France

Olympic Games
Gold medal – first place	1988 Seoul	Tornado

Jean-Yves Le Déroff (born 15 September 1957 in Inezgane, Souss-Massa-Drâa, Morocco) is a French sailor and Olympic champion. He won the Tornado class at the 1988 Summer Olympics in Seoul, South Korea, with Nicolas Hénard. He also has a silver medal from the 1987 World championship.
