= Walter Pirinoli =

Italian yacht racer

Walter Pirinoli (born 26 August 1963) is an Italian former yacht racer. After few French national titles in Moth Europe and 470, he started with his brother Marco Pirinoli a new carrier on the Olympic catamaran (Tornado) for Italy. In 1991, they finished 3rd at the European championship and 2nd at the World championship. They were part of the Italian team at the Olympics in 1992. In 1995, they will get the ticket for the Olympics just in front of their best enemy, Zuccoli-Glisoni. The same year they won the pre-olympic regatta in Savannah and 15 days after the World Championship in Kingston. In 1996, they received a prestigious honorific medal from the hands of the Italian president.
