= Reg White =

British sailor

- Born: 28 October 1935; Brightlingsea, Essex, England
- Died: 27 May 2010 (aged 74); Brightlingsea, Essex, England
- Occupation: Boat builder

Medal record

Men's sailing

Representing United Kingdom

Olympic Games
Gold medal – first place	1976 Montreal	Tornado

Reginald James White (28 October 1935 – 27 May 2010) was an English boat builder, sailor, Olympic champion and world champion. He won a gold medal in the Tornado class with John Osborn at the 1976 Summer Olympics in Montreal.

He became world champion in the Tornado class in 1976 and 1979.

White died just after sailing his Brightlingsea One-Design
