= Giorgio Zuccoli =

Italian yacht racer

Giorgio Zuccoli (17 February 1958 – 27 March 2001) was an Italian yacht racer who competed in the 1988 Summer Olympics and in the 1992 Summer Olympics.
