= Robert White (sailor) =

British sailor

Personal information
- Nationality: British
- Born: 23 April 1956 (age 70) Tendring, England

Sport
- Sport: Sailing

Robert White (born 23 April 1956) is a British sailor. He competed at the 1984 Summer Olympics and the 1988 Summer Olympics.
