= Yves Loday =

French sailor

Medal record

Men's sailing

Representing France

Olympic Games
Gold medal – first place	1992 Barcelona	Tornado

Yves Loday (born 27 September 1955) is a French sailor who competed in the 1992 Summer Olympics in Barcelona, where he won gold medal in the Tornado class together with Nicolas Hénard. Loday went on to train other Olympic windsurfers in 1993 including Pascale Paturau from Mauritius who competed in the Barcelona Olympics.

Loday is the designer of the Extreme 40 sailing catamaran, which is used in the Extreme Sailing Series very high speed regattas.
