= Christopher Cairns (sailor) =

Australian sailor

Personal information
- Nationality: Australian
- Born: 21 June 1957 (age 69)
- Height: 177 cm (5 ft 10 in)
- Weight: 68 kg (150 lb)

Sailing career
- Sport: Sailing
- Class: Tornado
Medal record
Sailing
Representing Australia
Olympic Games
Bronze medal – third place	1984 Los Angeles	Tornado

Christopher Cairns (born 21 June 1957) is an Australian competitive sailor and Olympic medalist. He won a bronze medal in the Tornado class at the 1984 Summer Olympics in Los Angeles.
