= 2006 Tornado World Championship =

The 2006 Tornado World Championship was held at the Club Náutico San Isidro in San Isidro, Argentina between 1 and 10 December 2006.

== Results ==
Results of individual races
| Pos | Crew | Country | I | II | III | IV | V | VI | VII | VIII | IX | Tot | Pts |
|---|---|---|---|---|---|---|---|---|---|---|---|---|---|
| Gold medal | Darren Bundock; Glenn Ashby | Australia | 6 | 2 | 4 | 2 | 1 | 5 | 1 | 2 | DNS 48^{†} | 71 | 23 |
| Silver medal | Santiago Lange; Carlos Espínola | Argentina | 7 | 23^{†} | 8 | 4 | 12 | 2 | 2 | 1 | 1 | 60 | 37 |
| Bronze medal | Roman Hagara; Hans-Peter Steinacher | Austria | 1 | 8 | 1 | 3 | 2 | 33^{†} | 11 | 4 | 11 | 74 | 41 |
| 4 | Iordanis Paschalidis; Konstantinos Trigkonis | Greece | 31^{†} | 3 | 13 | 7 | 9 | 11 | 5 | 11 | 8 | 98 | 67 |
| 5 | Yann Guichard; Alexandre Guyader | France | 9 | 31^{†} | 14 | 18 | 6 | 16 | 6 | 5 | 3 | 108 | 77 |
| 6 | Johannes Polgar; Florian Spalteholz | Germany | 15 | 1 | 28^{†} | 10 | 4 | 4 | 4 | 15 | 27 | 108 | 80 |
| 7 | Fernando Echavarri; Antón Paz | Spain | 11 | 13 | 12 | 22 | 7 | 19 | 26^{†} | 3 | 2 | 115 | 89 |
| 8 | Billy Besson; Arnaud Jarlegan | France | 10 | 21 | 15 | 1 | 18 | 3 | 21 | 9 | 24^{†} | 122 | 98 |
| 9 | Enrique Figueroa; Jorge Hernandez | Puerto Rico | 3 | 18 | 25 | 17 | 5 | 18 | 31^{†} | 12 | 7 | 136 | 105 |
| 10 | Xavier Revil; Christophe Espagnon | France | 2 | 5 | 22 | 24 | 11 | 7 | 12 | 26^{†} | 25 | 133 | 108 |
| 11 | Roland Gäbler; Gunnar Struckmann | Germany | 12 | 10 | 19 | 19 | 14 | 22 | 7 | 8 | 36^{†} | 147 | 111 |
| 12 | Matthieu Souben; Gurvan Bontemps | France | 5 | 28 | 11 | 9 | 20 | 12 | 9 | 21 | 33^{†} | 148 | 115 |
| 13 | François Morvan; Matthieu Vandame | France | 8 | 29 | 9 | 15 | 10 | 6 | 8 | DSQ 48^{†} | 30 | 163 | 115 |
| 14 | Mitch Booth; Pim Nieuwenhuis | Netherlands | 4 | 12 | 7 | 27 | 22 | 27 | 34^{†} | 16 | 5 | 154 | 120 |
| 15 | Oliver Backes; Paul-Ambroise Sevestre | France | 26 | 17 | 32^{†} | 5 | 8 | 29 | 13 | 25 | 6 | 161 | 129 |
| 16 | Oskar Johansson; Kevin Stittle | Canada | 29 | 19 | 24 | 8 | 3 | 25 | 19 | 30^{†} | 4 | 161 | 131 |
| 17 | Javier Padron; Antonio Cuevas Mons | Spain | 23 | 4 | 26 | 13 | 17 | 9 | 33^{†} | 18 | 21 | 164 | 131 |
| 18 | Francesco Marcolini; Edoardo Bianchi | Italy | 20 | 6 | 18 | 6 | 24 | 30^{†} | 14 | 24 | 19 | 161 | 131 |
| 19 | Leigh Mc Millan; William Howden | Great Britain | 19 | 11 | 16 | 28 | 15 | 17 | OCS 48^{†} | 19 | 9 | 182 | 134 |
| 20 | Rob Wilson; Mark Bulkeley | Great Britain | 18 | 9 | 29 | 26 | 36^{†} | 14 | 22 | 6 | 12 | 172 | 136 |
| 21 | Carolijn Brouwer; Sébastien Godefroid | Belgium | 28 | 14 | 30 | 11 | 34^{†} | 32 | 3 | 14 | 14 | 180 | 146 |
| 22 | Andrey Kirilyuk; Valery Ushkov | Russia | 30 | 33^{†} | 2 | 31 | 25 | 8 | 15 | 20 | 18 | 182 | 149 |
| 23 | Andrew Walsh; Edward Barney | Great Britain | 24 | 20 | 5 | 33 | 19 | 15 | 37^{†} | 22 | 17 | 192 | 155 |
| 24 | Tino Mittelmeier; Niko Mittelmeier | Germany | 14 | 25 | 6 | 20 | 23 | 23 | 39^{†} | 23 | 28 | 201 | 162 |
| 25 | Daniel Robbie; Gary Chu | United States | 13 | DNF 48^{†} | 17 | 12 | 29 | 10 | 10 | 35 | 37 | 211 | 163 |
| 26 | Mischa Heemskerk; Herbert Dercksen | Netherlands | OCS 48^{†} | 7 | 20 | 21 | 41 | 1 | 27 | 28 | 23 | 216 | 168 |
| 27 | John Lovell; Charlie Ogletree | United States | OCS 48^{†} | 15 | 10 | 25 | 16 | 31 | 17 | 29 | 26 | 217 | 169 |
| 28 | Vincenzo Sorrentino; Giorgio Colombo | Italy | 21 | 22 | OCS 48^{†} | 18 | 27 | 26 | 35 | 7 | 15 | 219 | 171 |
| 29 | Thomas Zajac; Thomas Czajka | Austria | 16 | 27 | 23 | OCS 48^{†} | 30 | 21 | 29 | 27 | 10 | 231 | 183 |
| 30 | Aaron Mcintosh; Bruce Kendall | New Zealand | OCS 48^{†} | 34 | 27 | 29 | 13 | 20 | 24 | 17 | 22 | 234 | 186 |
| 31 | Toni Rivas; Fabian Escude | Spain | OCS 48^{†} | 26 | 3 | 14 | 21 | 34 | 28 | DNS 48 | 13 | 235 | 187 |
| 32 | Hugh Styles; Tom Peel | Great Britain | 32 | DNF 48^{†} | 21 | 23 | 40 | 35 | 18 | 10 | 20 | 247 | 199 |
| 33 | Christopher Rashley; Marcus Lynch | Great Britain | 22 | 24 | 31 | 34 | 26 | 36 | 30 | 13 | 38^{†} | 254 | 216 |
| 34 | Diogo Cayolla; Frederico Cerveira | Portugal | 25 | 30 | 34^{†} | 30 | 33 | 24 | 25 | 33 | 16 | 250 | 216 |
| 35 | Sergey Dzhienbaev; Maxim Semenov | Russia | OCS 48^{†} | 36 | 33 | OCS 48 | 28 | 13 | 23 | 32 | 34 | 295 | 247 |
| 36 | Andre Mirsky; Naldi Gual | Brazil | 34 | 37 | 39^{†} | 16 | 32 | 28 | 36 | 34 | 32 | 288 | 249 |
| 37 | Wouter Samana; Jeroen van Leeuwen | Netherlands | 35 | 16 | 36 | 32 | 38 | 37 | 32 | 39^{†} | 29 | 294 | 255 |
| 38 | Bruno Di Bernardi; Andre Chang | Brazil | 27 | 35 | 38 | 37 | 35 | 39 | 16 | 31 | OCS 48^{†} | 306 | 258 |
| 39 | Donald Thinschmidt; Andrew Wierda | United States | DSQ 48^{†} | 32 | 41 | 36 | 31 | 38 | 20 | 37 | 39 | 322 | 274 |
| 40 | Fernando Garcia Guevara; Gustavo Mariani | Argentina | 17 | 40 | 42^{†} | 41 | 37 | 41 | 40 | 41 | 31 | 330 | 288 |
| 41 | Thomas Jessenig; Stefan Jessenig | Austria | 33 | 39 | 35 | 38 | 39 | 43^{†} | 38 | 40 | 35 | 340 | 297 |
| 42 | Mike Grandfield; Brock Callen | United States | 36 | 38 | 37 | 35 | 44 | 40 | DNF 48^{†} | DNS 48 | 42 | 368 | 320 |
| 43 | Esteban Blando; Alejandro Noe | Argentina | 37 | 41 | 40 | 40 | 42 | 42 | 42 | 38 | OCS 48^{†} | 370 | 322 |
| 44 | Stanislav Golembievskyy; Olexiy Voloshenyuk | Ukraine | 39 | 42 | 43 | 42 | 43 | 44^{†} | 41 | 36 | 41 | 371 | 327 |
| 45 | Alan Dubuc; Mark Herendeen | Canada | 40 | 43 | 44 | 43 | 45^{†} | 45 | 43 | 42 | 40 | 385 | 340 |
| 46 | Luo Youjia; Chen Xiuke | China | 38 | DNF 48^{†} | OCS 48 | 39 | 46 | 46 | DNS 48 | DNS 48 | DNS 48 | 409 | 361 |
| 47 | Jochen Seifert; Jurgen Tiemann | Germany | 41 | 44 | 45 | 44 | DNS 48^{†} | DNS 48 | DNS 48 | DNS 48 | DNS 48 | 414 | 366 |

Legend: DNF – Did not finish; DNS – Did not start; DSQ – Disqualified; OCS – On the course side of the starting line;
