= Moth World Championship =

World Championship in the Foiling Moth Class

The Moth World Championship is an annual international sailing regatta for Moth (dinghy) they are organized by the host club on behalf of the International Moth Class Association and recognized by World Sailing, the sports IOC recognized governing body. The class obtained its world sailing status during 1972 holding its first recognized World Championship in 1973.

== Events ==
Ed.			Location			Competitors					Ref.
No.	Day/Month	Year	Host club	City	Country	Boats	Nat.	Cont.			Ref.
1	-	1973	Napier Sailing Club	Napier	New Zealand						
2	-	1974			Sweden						
3	-	1975			Australia						
4	-	1976		Ware River, VA	United States						
5	16-22 Jul	1977	Hayling Island Sailing Club	Hayling Island	United Kingdom						
6	-	1978		Brisbane	Australia						
7	-	1979		Travemünde	Germany						
8	-	1980			New Zealand						
9	-	1971		Harderwyk	Netherlands						
10	-	1972			Australia						
11	-	1983		Eastbourne	United Kingdom						
12	-	1984		Hamaniko	Japan						
13	-	1985		ThunerSee	Switzerland						
14	-	1986		Adelaide	Australia						
15	-	1987		Hunnebostrand, Götaland County	Sweden						
N/A	-	1988	NOT HELD								
16	-	1989		Auckland	New Zealand						
17	-	1990	Ratzeburg Seigler Verein	Ratzeburg	Germany						
18	-	1991		Miyazu City	Japan	51					
N/A	-	1992	NOT HELD								
19	-	1993	Highcliffe Sailing Club	Highcliffe	United Kingdom	75					
N/A	-	1994	NOT HELD								
20	-	1995		Lake Macquarie	Australia						
21	1-6 Jul	1996	Ratzeburg Seigler Verein	Ratzeburg	Germany						
N/A	-	1997	NOT HELD								
22	-	1998		Torbay	United Kingdom						
N/A	-	1999	NOT HELD								
23	27Dec -9Jan	1999/20/00	Mounts Bay Sailing Club, Australia	Crawley, Perth. WA	Australia	43	6	4	42	1	
24	5-14 Oct	2001	Chosgi Marina	Choshi	Japan	35	4	3	34	1	
N/A	-	2002	NOT HELD								
25	24-30 Aug	2003	Sports Nautiques Sablais	Les Sables d'Olonne	France	41	7	3	40	1	
N/A	-	2004	NOT HELD								
26	2-8 Jan	2005	Black Rock Yacht Club	Black Rock, Victoria	Australia	45	6	3	44	1	
27	22-29 Jul	2006	Horsens Seijlklub	Horsens	Denmark	31	10	3	31	0	
28	25-30 Jun	2007	Circolo Vela Torbole	Nago–Torbole, Lake Garda	Italy	58	13	3	57	1	
29	5-11 Jul	2008	Weymouth and Portland National Sailing Academy	Isle of Portland	United Kingdom	78	18	4	74	4	
30	10-15 Aug	2009	Columbia Gorge Racing Association	Cascade Locks, Oregon	United States	46	11	4	44	2	
31	8-15 Mar	2010	Dubai Offshore Sailing Club	Dubai	United Arab Emirates	43	9	4	40	3	
32	8-14 Jan	2011	Belmont 16ft Sailing Club	Belmont, Lake Macquarie	Australia	109	11	4			
33	16-26 Aug	2012	Vela Club Campione del Garda	Lake Garda	Italy	112	20	4			
34	12-19 Oct	2013	Kaneohe Yacht Club	Kaneohe Bay, Hawaii	United States	80	15	4	75	5	
35	29-25 Jul	2014	Hayling Island Sailing Club	Hayling Island	United Kingdom	132	17	5	127	5	
36	10-16 Jan	2015	Sorrento Sailing Couta Boat Club	Sorrento, Victoria	Australia	158	15	5	148	10	
37	23–29 May	2016		Hayama	Japan	68	11	5	61	6	
38	25-29 Jul	2017	Fraglia Vela Malcesine	Malcesine, Lake Garda	Italy	73	14	4	72	1	
39	23Mar -1Apr	2018	Royal Bermuda Yacht Club	Hamilton	Bermuda	44	12	4	43	1	
40	9-18 Dev	2019	Mounts Bay Sailing Club, Australia	Crawley, Western Australia	Australia	122	16	5	120	2	
N/A	3-11 Sep	2020	Weymouth and Portland National Sailing Academy	Isle of Portland	United Kingdom	CANCELLED DUE TO COVID-19					
41	31Aug -7Sep	2021	Fraglia Vela Malcesine	Malcesine, Lake Garda	Italy	139	25	5	128	11	
42	27Nov -4Dev	2022	Yacht Club Argentino	Buenos Aires	Argentina	38	10	4	35	3	
43	12-18 Jun	2023	Weymouth and Portland National Sailing Academy	Isle of Portland	United Kingdom	128	21	5	122	6	
44	30Dec -9Jan	2024/25	Manly Sailing Club	Auckland	New Zealand	67	14	5	62	5	
45	7-13 Jul	2025	Fraglia Vela Malcesine	Malcesine, Lake Garda	Italy	130	22	5	121	9	
45	Nov	2026	Mount Bay Sailing Club, Australia		Australia	43	11	4	42	1	

== Multiple World Champions ==
Compiled from the data below the table includes up to and including 2026.

Ranking	Sailor	Gold	Silver	Bronze	Total	No. Entries*	Ref.
1	Paul Goodison (GBR)	3	0	1	4	7	
1	Mark Thorpe (AUS)	3	0	1	4	4	
3	David Izatt (GBR)	3	0	0	3	3	
4	Nathan Outteridge (AUS)	2	3	0	5	7	
5	Rohan Veal (AUS)	2	1	1	4	6	
5	Simon Payne (GBR)	2	1	1	4	9	
7	Tom Slingsby (AUS)	2	1	0	3	6	
8	Bora Gulari (USA)	2	0	0	2	7	
8	Enzo Balanger (FRA)	2	0	0	2	6	
8	Robin Wood (GBR)	2	0	0	2	2	
8	Roger Angell (GBR)	2	0	0	2	2	
8	Steve Shimeld (AUS)	2	0	0	2	2	
8	Robert O'Sullivan (AUS)	2	0	0	2	2	
8	Emmett Lazich (AUS)	2	0	0	2	2	

== Medalists ==
Year	Gold	Silver	Bronze	Ref.
1973	Design - Good Grief; Ian Brown (AUS)			
1974	Design - Scow; Robert O'Sullivan (AUS)	Ian Brown (AUS)	Tomáš Tokoš (TCH)	
1975	Peter Moor (AUS); Design - Snubby	Robert O'Sullivan (AUS)	Ian Brown (AUS)	
1976	Ted Causey (USA); Design - Modified Poacher	Peter Moor (AUS)	John Claridge (GBR)	
1977	Design - Womble; Bill Short (GBR)	Cliff Burton (AUS)		
1978	Robert O'Sullivan (AUS); Design - Gidget			
1979	David Izatt (GBR); Magnum 3			
1980	David Izatt (GBR); Magnum 3			
1981	David Izatt (GBR); Magnum 5	Richard Hargreaves (GBR); Magnum 5	Robin Wood (GBR); Magnum 3	
1982	Greg Hilton (AUS); SCOW			
1983	Robin Wood (GBR); Magnum 5	Roger Angell (GBR)	Chris Cottrill (GBR)	
1984	Robin Wood (GBR); Magnum 6	Andrew McDougall (AUS)		
1985	Roger Angell (GBR); Magnum 6	Andrew McDougall (AUS); Wombat	Tony Phillips (GBR); Magnum 6	
1986	Steve Shimeld (AUS); Stray (Skiff)	Andrew Cuddihy (AUS)	Greg Hilton (AUS)	
1987	Steve Shimeld (AUS); McFrench Skiff	Jason Belben (GBR)	John Pearce (GBR)	
1989	Andrew Landenberger (AUS)	Richard Reatti (AUS)	John Pearce (GBR)	
1990	Roger Angell (GBR); Magnum 9	Clive Everest (GBR)	Andrew Landenberger (AUS)	
1991	Emmett Lazich (AUS); Aussie Axeman Mk1	Toby Collyer (GBR)	Tim Webster (AUS)	
1993	Toby Collyer (GBR); Magnum 9.5	Emmett Lazich (AUS)	Roger Angell (GBR)	
1995	Emmett Lazich (AUS); Aussie Axeman Mk2			
1996	Nick Spence (GBR); Skippy	Mark Thorpe (AUS)	Phil Hebden (AUS)	
1998	Mark Thorpe (AUS); Hungry Tiger	Nick Spence (GBR)	Ian Forsdike (GBR)	
1999/00	Chris Dey (AUS); Hungry Tiger	Andrew Coxall (AUS)	Mark Thorpe (AUS)	
2001	Mark Thorpe (AUS); Hungry Tiger	Chris Dey (AUS)	Andrew McDougall (AUS)	
2003	Mark Thorpe (AUS); Hungry Tiger	Les Thorpe (AUS)	Rohan Veal (AUS)	
2005	Rohan Veal (AUS); Prowler Mk 2	Simon Payne (GBR)	Adam May (GBR)	
2006	Simon Payne (GBR); Prowler mk4 / Fastacraft	Rohan Veal (AUS); Prowler / Fastacraft	Adam May (GBR); Mistress 2 / Adam May	
2007	Rohan Veal (AUS); Design - Bladeridder	Scott Babbage (AUS); Design - Bladeridder	Simon Payne (GBR); Design - Prowler	
2008	John Harris (AUS); Design - Bladeridder	Andrew McDougall (AUS)	Mathew Belcher (AUS)	
2009	Bora Gulari (USA); Design - Mach 2	Nathan Outteridge (AUS)	Arnaud Psarofaghis (SWI)	
2010	Simon Payne (GBR); Design - Mach 2	Andrew McDougall (AUS)	Brad Funk (USA)	
2011	Nathan Outteridge (AUS)	Joe Turner (AUS)	Scott Babbage (AUS)	
2012	Josh McKnight (AUS)	Scott Babbage (AUS)	Rob Gough (AUS)	
2013	Bora Gulari (USA); Mach 2	Nathan Outteridge (AUS); Mach 2	Scott Babbage (AUS); Mach 2	
2014	Nathan Outteridge (AUS)	Chris Rashley (GBR)	Josh Mcknight (AUS)	
2015	Peter Burling (NZL)	Nathan Outteridge (AUS)	Josh Mcknight (AUS)	
2016	Paul Goodison (GBR)	Chris Rashley (GBR)	Robert Greenhalgh (GBR)	
2017	Paul Goodison (GBR)	Peter Burling (NZL)	Iain Jensen (AUS)	
2018	Paul Goodison (GBR)	Francesco Bruni (ITA)	Rome Kirby (USA)	
2019	Tom Slingsby (AUS)	Kyle Langford (AUS)	Tom Burton (AUS)	
2020	Cancelled COVID 19			
2021	Tom Slingsby (AUS)	Iain Jensen (AUS)	Paul Goodison (GBR)	
2022	Dylan Fletcher-Scott (GBR)	Massimo Contessi (ARG)	Simone Salvà (ITA)	
2023	Insufficient Races Sailed			
2024/25	NZL 5107; Design - Mackay Bieker v3 Mattias Coutts (NZL)	NZL 5006; Design - Mackay Bieker v3 Jacob Pye (NZL)	AUS 5109; Design - Mackay Bieker v3 Otto Henry (AUS)	
2025	FRA 5062; Enzo Balanger (FRA)	AUS 5175; Tom Slingsby (AUS)	NZL 5249; Jacob Pye (NZL)	
2026	FRA 1 Enzo Balanger (FRA)	AUS 4 Ryan Littlechild (AUS)	AUS 7 Jack Ferguson (AUS)	
