= Hobie F18 World Championship =

Hobie Formula 18 Catamaran Worlds

The Hobie Tiger World Championship and the Hobie Wildcat World Championship also known as the Hobie F18 World Championship was an annual international sailing regatta for Hobie cats designed to compete in the Formula 18 but with additional rules. The design were the Hobie Tiger which was later superseded by the Hobie Wildcate. The event was organized by the host club on behalf of the International Hobie Class Association and recognized by World Sailing, the sports IOC recognized governing body.

== Editions ==
Event			Host			Sailors			Boats				Ref.
Ed.	Date	Year	Host club	Location	Nat.	No.	Nat.	Cont.	Boats			Mix	Ref.
Hobie Tiger
1	9-12 Jun	1999	Circolo Vela Torbole	Nago–Torbole, Lake Garda	Italy	148	17	5	74				
2	26-30 Jun	2001	Vela Club Campione Sul Garda	Lake Garda	Italy	176	12	5	88				
3	10-14 Feb	2003		Raffles Marina	Singapore	66	14	6	33	22	0	11	
4	28-31 Mar	2005	Santa Barbara Yacht Club	Santa Barbara, California	United States	174	15	6	87				
5	24-28 Jul	2006		Rodeira Beach, Cangas	Spain	118	12	6	59				
6	3-8 Mar	2008	Langebaan Yacht Club	Langebaan, WC	South Africa	126	14	4	63	49	0	14	
7	19-28 Jul	2013	Lubecker Yacht Club / Travemunder Woche	Travemünde, Lübeck, Schleswig-Holstein	Germany	32	6	3	16	14	0	2	
8	29Jul -1Aug	2015	Vela Club Campione del Garda	Lake Garda	Italy	32	6	3	16	12	0	4	
Hobie Wildcat
1		2013	Lubecker Yacht Club / Travemunder Woche	Travemünde, Lübeck, Schleswig-Holstein	Germany	44	6	3	22	15	0	7	
2	29Jul -1Aug	2015	Vela Club Campione del Garda	Lake Garda	Italy	50	9	3	28	22	0	7	
3		2017		Noordwijk	Netherlands	32	7	3	16	12	0	4	

== Medalists ==
Year	Gold	Silver	Bronze	Ref.
1999 - Tiger - 75 Boats	FRA-5016; Gerard Navarin (FRA); Bruno Bomati (FRA)	RSA-503; Allan Lawrence (RSA); Gordon Mcgillivray (RSA)	PNG-504; Mark Laruffa (ITA); David Silvester (AUS)	
2001 - Tiger - 88 Boats	ITA-884; Alberto Sonino (ITA); Gabriele Bruni (ITA)	AUS-807; Brad Sumner (AUS); Kevin Winchester (AUS)	AUS-729; Gavin Colby (AUS); Cori Camenish (AUS)	
2003 - Tiger - 33 Boats	1235; Mitch Booth (NED); Taylor Booth (AUS)	1144; Greg Thomas (USA); Jacques Bernier (USA)	1213; Gavin Colby (SUI); Cori Camenish (SUI)	
2005 - Tiger - 87 Boats	1604; Enrique Figueroa (PUR); Jorge Hernandez (PUR)	435; Taylor Booth (AUS); Mitch Booth (NED)	1569; Moana Vaireaux (FRA); Petit Romain (FRA)	
2006 - Tiger - 59 Boats	11; Jean-Christophe Mourniac (FRA); Franck Citeau (FRA)	2030; Moana Vaireaux (FRA); Petit Romain (FRA)	2106; Christophe Renaud De Malet (FRA); Alban Rossollin (FRA)	
2008 - Tiger - 63 Boats	2465; Mark Laruffa (AUS); Daniel Sims (AUS)	2423; Mitch Booth (NED); Tiffany Baring-Gould (RSA)	1962; Robbie Lovig (AUS); Lachlan Gibson (AUS)	
2013 - Tiger - 16 Boats	AUS 2621; Robbie Lovig (AUS); Andy Dinsdale (AUS)	RSA 2287; Allan Lawrence (RSA); Daniel Lawrence (RSA)	RSA 2004; Blaine Dodds (RSA); Peter Dodds (RSA)	
2013 - Wildcat - 22 Boats	FRA 550; Emeric Dary (FRA); Maxime Blondeau (FRA)	DEN 233; Daniel Bjørnholt (DEN); Nicolaj Bjornholt (DEN)	GER 286; Daniel Paysen (GER); Nico Heinrich (GER)	
2015 - Tiger - 16 Boats	RSA 2466; William Edwards (RSA); Douglas Edwards (RSA)	RSA 2004; Blaine Dodds (RSA); Peter-Blaine Dodds (RSA)	RSA 2636; Shaun Ferry (RSA); Lee Hawkins (RSA)	
2015 - Wildcat - 28 Boats	ESP 563; Mitch Booth (ESP); Ruben Booth (ESP)	FRA 550; CLEMENT Peduzzi (FRA); Maxime Blondeau (FRA)	ITA 3 Elia Mazzucchi (ITA); Jacopo Lisignoli (ITA)	
2017 - Wildcat - 16 Boats	ESP 594; Mitch Booth (AUS); Rita Booth (ESP)	RSA 394; Blaine Dodds (RSA); Charles Girad (RSA)	ESP 21; Jordi Sanchez (ESP); Alberto Torne (ESP)	
