= Roman Hagara =

Austrian sailor

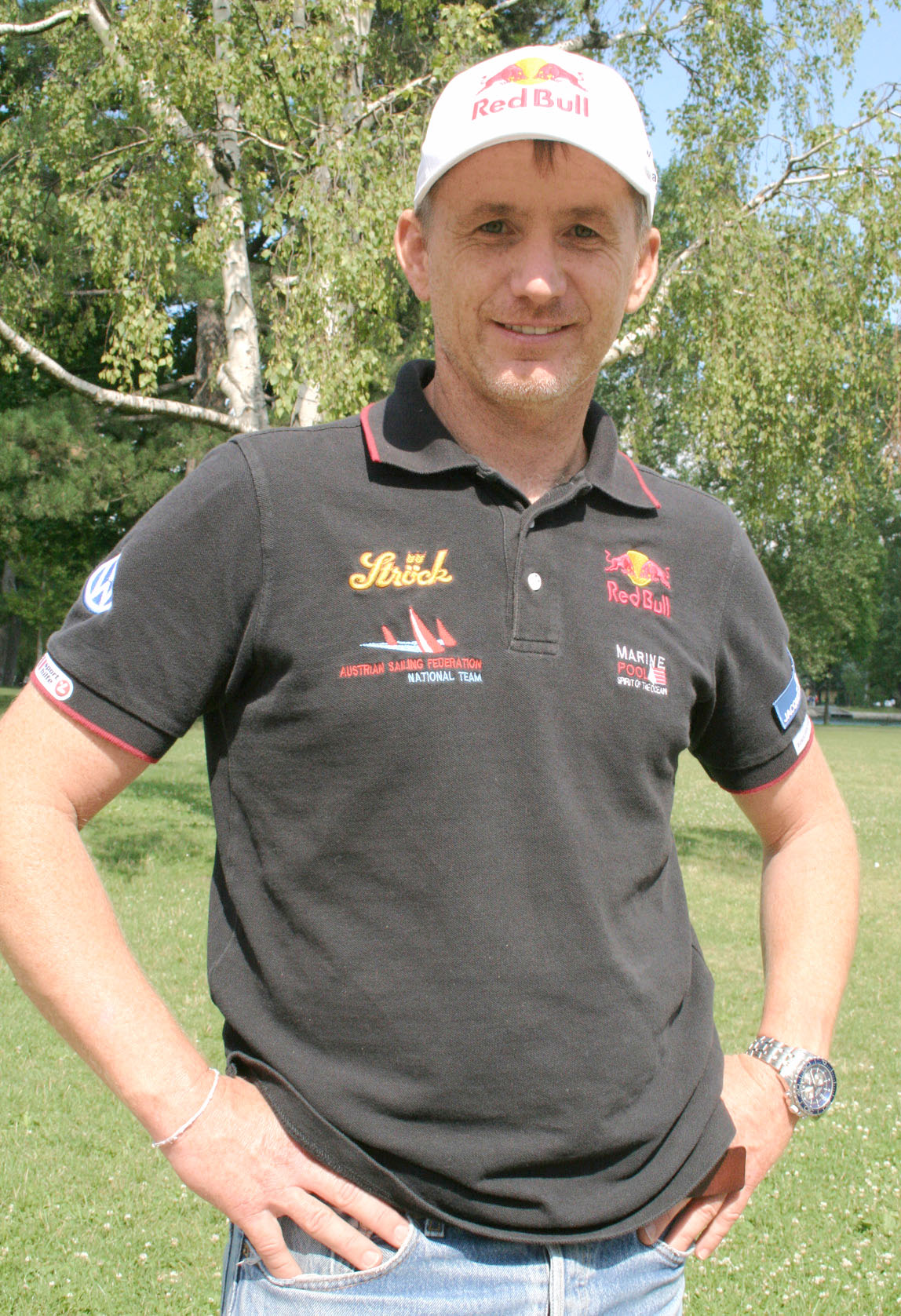
- Roman Hagara in 2008

Personal information
- Born: 30 April 1966 (age 60) Vienna, Austria

Sailing career
- Sport: Sailing
Medal record
Sailing
Representing Austria
Event	1st	2nd	3rd
Olympic Games	2	0	0
World Championships	2	2	2
European Championships	5	2	0
Olympic Games
Gold medal – first place	2000 Sydney	Tornado
Gold medal – first place	2004 Athens	Tornado
World Championships
Gold medal – first place	1987 Kiel	Tornado
Gold medal – first place	1999 Vallensbæk	Tornado
Silver medal – second place	2000 Sydney	Tornado
Silver medal – second place	2001 Richards Bay	Tornado
Bronze medal – third place	1990 Medemblik	Tornado
Bronze medal – third place	2006 San Isidro	Tornado
European Championships
Gold medal – first place	1990 Breitenbrunn	Tornado
Gold medal – first place	1997 La Grande-Motte	Tornado
Gold medal – first place	2000 Alassio	Tornado
Gold medal – first place	2001 Silvaplana	Tornado
Gold medal – first place	2006 Travemünde	Tornado
Silver medal – second place	2003 Cagliari	Tornado
Silver medal – second place	2005 Västervik	Tornado

Roman Hagara (born 30 April 1966) is an Austrian sailor who has won the gold medal in the Tornado class at two consecutive Olympic Games.

Hagara, and his colleague Hans-Peter Steinacher won the gold medal in the Tornado class at the 2000 Summer Olympics in Sydney, and successfully defended their title at the 2004 Summer Olympics in Athens, which, to date, makes them Austria's the most successful summer sport athletes as the first professional Austrian sailing team.

Hagara was the Flagbearer for the Austrian team at the 2004 Summer Olympics Opening Ceremony. Along with his teammate Steinacher, he has won the Austrian Sports Personality of the Year twice, in 2000 and 2004.

== Career ==
Born in Vienna, Hagara represents the Yachtclub Zell am See. Originally trained in windsurfing, Roman Hagara soon competed against his now teammate Hans-Peter Steinacher, until they decided in 1997 to train for the 2000 Olympics together. Before 1997, Roman Hagara worked as crew, then changed to skipper.

In the 2000 Olympics, the team was the very first to work with customized sails. Since then, the team has always focused on being ahead of technological developments, which now shows in their involvement in the foiling technology.

=== America's Cup and Red Bull Youth America's Cup ===
Since 2009, he has focused more on the big boat scene with Hans-Peter Steinacher, including competing on an America's Cup yacht. Hagara was the skipper of Hagara-Steinacher Racing (HS Racing) in the 2011–13 America's Cup World Series.

Under the flag of the United States for San Francisco's Golden Gate Yacht Club, the duo competed in a 2013 America's Cup World Series event in Naples, Italy. Racing this event gave the team firsthand experience in what has become Hagara and Steinacher's primary focus, mentoring the next generation of sailors on the next generation of sail boats: hydrofoils.

=== Extreme Sailing Series ===
Roman Hagara was also the skipper for Red Bull Extreme Sailing Team in the Extreme Sailing Series. With the series' announcement that foiling catamarans will be part of its future, Hagara and Steinacher have taken on a full crew of athletes who honed their skills in the Red Bull Youth America's Cup.

=== Mentoring young talents ===
As of 2015, Roman Hagara and Hans-Peter Steinacher mentor young sailors in three series: as sports directors of Red Bull Foiling Generation and the Red Bull Youth America's Cup, and as leaders of the Red Bull Extreme Sailing Team that competes in the Extreme Sailing Series. Hagara and Steinacher look for talented sailors in their respective age groups to give them insights and show them a new way of sailing.

== Personal life ==
His brother Andreas Hagara also sailed.
