= A-Cat World Championship =

Catamaran World Championship

The A-Class Catamaran World Championship is an annual international sailing regatta for International A-class catamaran they are organized by the host club on behalf of the International Class Association and recognized by World Sailing, the sports IOC recognized governing body.

== Events ==
Event			Host			Class	Participation					Ref.
Ed.	Dates	Year	Host club	Location	Country	Class	Boats	Male	Fem.	Nat.	Cont.	Ref.
1	-	1981		Botany Bay	Australia	Open						
2	-	1982		Cesenatico	Italy	Open						
3	6 - 13 Mar	1984		Wellington	New Zealand	Open						
4	20–29 July	1985		Spray Beach	United States	Open	38					
5		1986		Brenzone	Italy	Open						
6		1987		Blairgowrie	Australia	Open						
7	28 Aug to 2 Sept	1988		Turkey Point	Canada	Open						
N/A		1988	NOT HELD									
8		1990		Napier	New Zealand	Open						
9	-	1991	Gromitz Swgel-Club	Gromitz	Germany	Open	62					
10	-	1992	Segelclub St. Moritz	Saint Moritz	Switzerland	Open	67					
11	-	1993		Sanguinet	France	Open						
12	-	1994		Lake Cootharaba	Australia	Open	51					
13	7 - 11 Aug	1995	Stichting Catamaran Zeilwedstrijden	Andijk	Netherlands	Open	59			9	2	
14	-	1996	Club Nautic Estartit	L'Estartit	Spain	Open	85			14	3	
15	16-21 Sep	1997	Alamitos Bay Yacht Club	Long Beach, California	United States	Open	48			10	3	
N/A		1998	NOT HELD									
16	8-15 Jan	1999	McCrae Yacht Club	McCrae, Victoria	Australia	Open	87			9	3	
17	14–23 July	2000		Cesenatico	Italy	Open	100			11	3	
18	17-25 Aug	2001		Port Genesta	Spain	Open						
19	13-20 Sep	2002	Vineyard Haven Yacht Club	Vineyard Haven	United States	Open	48			13	4	
N/A		2003	NOT HELD									
20	2-10 Feb	2004	New Plymouth Yacht Club	New Plymouth	New Zealand	Open	49			5	2	
21	18-24 Jun	2005	Club de Voile de Sanguinet	Sanguinet	France	Open	100			17	4	
22		2006		Vastervik	Sweden	Open	82			16	4	
23	10 - 16 Nov	2007	Islander resort & USIACA	Ismoralda	United States	Open	98			11	3	
24	2-9 Jan	2009	Belmont 16ft Sailing Club	Belmont, Lake Macquarie, NSW	Australia	Open	93			13	3	
25	6 -7Mar	2010	Congrega Velisti Cesenatico	Cesenatico	Italy	Open	100			17	3	
26	13-20 Aug	2011	Kaløvig Sailing Center	Kaløvig	Denmark	Open	95			16	3	
27	19–27 Oct	2012		Islamorada Key	United States	Open	74			9	3	
28	9-16 Feb	2014	Takapuna Boating Club	Takapuna, Auckland	New Zealand	Open	81			12	4	
29	5-12 Sep	2015	Centro Velico Punta Ala	Punta Ala	Italy	Open	154			16	4	
30	18-24 Jun	2016	Royal Yacht Club Hollandia	Medemblik	Netherlands	Open	118			17	4	
31	19–26 Aug	2017		Sopot	Poland	Open	125	122	3	18	4	
32	23-30 Aug	2018	Hervey Bay Sailing Club	Torquay, Hervey Bay, Queensland	Australia	Foil	69			12	3	
32	23-30 Aug	2018	Hervey Bay Sailing Club	Torquay, Hervey Bay, Queensland	Australia	Classic	45			8	3	
33	25–30 Aug	2019	Weymouth and Portland National Sailing Academy	Isle of Portland	United Kingdom	Foil	64	63	1	15	3	
33	25–30 Aug	2019	Weymouth and Portland National Sailing Academy	Isle of Portland	United Kingdom	Classic	23	23	1	8	2	
N/A	–	2020	St. Petersburg Yacht Club	St. Petersburg, Florida	United States	Cancelled due to the COVID-19 pandemic.						
N/A	5–12 Nov	2021	St. Petersburg Yacht Club	St. Petersburg, Florida	United States	Cancelled due to the COVID-19 pandemic.						
34	30 Apr to 6 May	2022	Houston Yacht Club	Houston, Texas	United States	Foil	19	18	1	5	4	
34	30 Apr to 6 May	2022	Houston Yacht Club	Houston, Texas	United States	Classic	18	18	0	5	3	
35	7–15 Sep	2023	Yacht Club de Toulon	Toulon	France	Foil	46	44	2	13	3	
35	7–15 Sep	2023	Yacht Club de Toulon	Toulon	France	Classic	80	79	1	13	3	
36	-	2024	Centro Velico Punta Ala	Punta Ala	Italy	Foil	84			16	4	
36	-	2024	Centro Velico Punta Ala	Punta Ala	Italy	Classic	86	85	1	15	4	
37	8-16 Nov	2025	Milford Cruising Club	Auckland	New Zealand	Foil	22	21	1	8	4	
37	8-16 Nov	2025	Milford Cruising Club	Auckland	New Zealand	Classic	29	29	0	6	3	
38	5-14 Nov	2026	Davis Island Yacht Club	Tampa, Florida	United States	Foil						
38	5-14 Nov	2026	Davis Island Yacht Club	Tampa, Florida	United States	Classic						

== Multiple World Champions ==
Compiled from the table below includes up to and including 2025.

Ranking	Sailor	Gold	Silver	Bronze	Total	No. Entries"	Ref.
1	Glenn Ashby (AUS)	10	3	0	13	15	
2	Steven Brewin (AUS)	3	3	5	11	21	
3	Mischa Heemskerk (NED)	3	3	1	7	10	
4	Jakub Surowiec (POL)	3	0	1	4	7	
5	John Scott Anderson (AUS)	2	10	3	15	24	
6	Andrew Landenberger (AUS)	2	1	3	6	15	
7	Egidio Babbi (ITA)	2	1	2	5	8	
8	Greg Goodall (AUS)	2	1	1	4	11	
9	Alan Goodall (AUS)	2	1	0	3	3	
10	Pete Melvin (USA)	2	0	1	3	6	
11	Paul Mckenzie (AUS)	2	0	0	2	2	
12	Nils Bunkenburg (GER)	2	0	0	2	8	

== Medalists ==
Year	Gold	Silver	Bronze	Ref.
1981	Bill Anderson (AUS)			
1982	Alberto Babbi (ITA)			
1984	Allan Goodall (AUS)			
1985	Allan Goodall (AUS)	Greg Goodall (AUS)	Massimo Corbara (ITA)	
1986	Scott Anderson (AUS)			
1987	Brad Schafferuis (AUS)			
1988	Greg Goodall (AUS)			
1990	Greg Goodall (AUS)			
1991	Paul McKenzie (AUS)	Allan Goodall (AUS)	Greg Goodall (AUS)	
1992	Paul McKenzie (AUS)	Egidio Babbi (ITA)	Scott Anderson (AUS)	
1993	Egidio Babbi (ITA)	Paul McKenzie (AUS)	Scott Anderson (AUS)	
1994	Mitch Booth (AUS)			
1995	Egidio Babbi (ITA)	Dario MINELLI	Roman STROBI	
1996	Glenn Ashby (AUS)	Scott Anderson (AUS)	Egidio Babbi (ITA)	
1997	Pete Melvin (USA)	Scott Anderson (AUS)	Francesco Marcolini (ITA)	
1999	Nils Bunkenburg (GER)	Scott Anderson (AUS)	Cameron Owen (AUS)	
2000	Nils Bunkenburg (GER)	Glenn Ashby (AUS)	Egidio Babbi (ITA)	
2001	Steven Brewin (AUS)	Glenn Ashby (AUS)	Scott Anderson (AUS)	
2002	Glenn Ashby (AUS)	Scott Anderson (AUS)	Steven Brewin (AUS)	
2003	NOT HELD			
2004	Glenn Ashby (AUS)	Scott Anderson (AUS)	Steven Brewin (AUS)	
2005	Pete Melvin (USA)	Glenn Ashby (AUS)	Steven Brewin (AUS)	
2006	Glenn Ashby (AUS)	Scott Anderson (AUS)	Manuel Calavia (ESP)	
2007	Glenn Ashby (AUS)	Lars Guck (USA)	Pete Melvin (USA)	
2008	NOT HELD			
2009	Glenn Ashby (AUS)	Steven Brewin (AUS)	Andrew Landenberger (AUS)	
2010	Glenn Ashby (AUS)	Steven Brewin (AUS)	Jack Benson (AUS)	
2011	Steve Brewin (AUS)	Scott Anderson (AUS)	Jack Benson (AUS)	
2012	Mischa Heemskerk (NED)	Scott Anderson (AUS)	Jack Benson (AUS)	
2013	NOT HELD			
2014	Glenn Ashby (AUS)	Blair Tuke (NZL)	Peter Burling (NZL)	
2015	Glenn Ashby (AUS)	Mischa Heemskerk (NED)	Manuel Calavia (ESP)	
2016	Mischa Heemskerk (NED)	Darren Bundock (AUS)	Steve Brewin (AUS)	
2017	Steve Brewin (AUS)	Tymoteusz Bendyk (POL)	Jakub Surowiec (POL)	
2018 Foiling	Glenn Ashby (AUS)	Mischa Heemskerk (NED)	Blair Tuke (NZL)	
2018 Classic	Andrew Landenberger (AUS)	Scott Anderson (AUS)	Graeme Parker (AUS)	
2019 Foiling	Mischa Heemskerk (NED)	Dave Shaw (NZL)	Tymoteusz Bendyk (POL)	
2019 Classic	Andrew Landenberger (AUS)	Scott Anderson (AUS)	Andrew Landenberger (AUS)	
2020	CANCELLED DUE TO COVID|			
2021	CANCELLED DUE TO COVID			
2022 Foil	Ravi Parent (USA)	Jakub Surowiec (POL)	Riley Gibbs (USA)	
2022 Classic	Andrew Landenberger (AUS)	Michael Todd (ESP)	Andreas Landenberger (AUS)	
2023 Foil	Jakub Surowiec (POL)	Mischa Heemskerk (NED)	Darren Bundock (AUS)	
2023 Classic	Scott Anderson (AUS)	Doreste Blanco Gustavo (ESP)	Andrew Landenberger (AUS)	
2024 Foil	Jakub Surowiec (POL)	Darren Bundock (AUS)	Mischa Heemskerk (NED)	
2024 Classic	Doreste Blanco Gustavo (ESP)	Scott Anderson (AUS)	Jacek Noetzel (POL)	
2025 Foil	Jakub Surowiec (POL)	Ravi Parent (USA)	Darren Bundock (AUS)	
2025 Classic	Jacek Noetzel (POL)	Jamie Jochheim (AUS)	Andreas Landenberger (AUS)	
