= Hans-Peter Steinacher =

Sailor from Austria

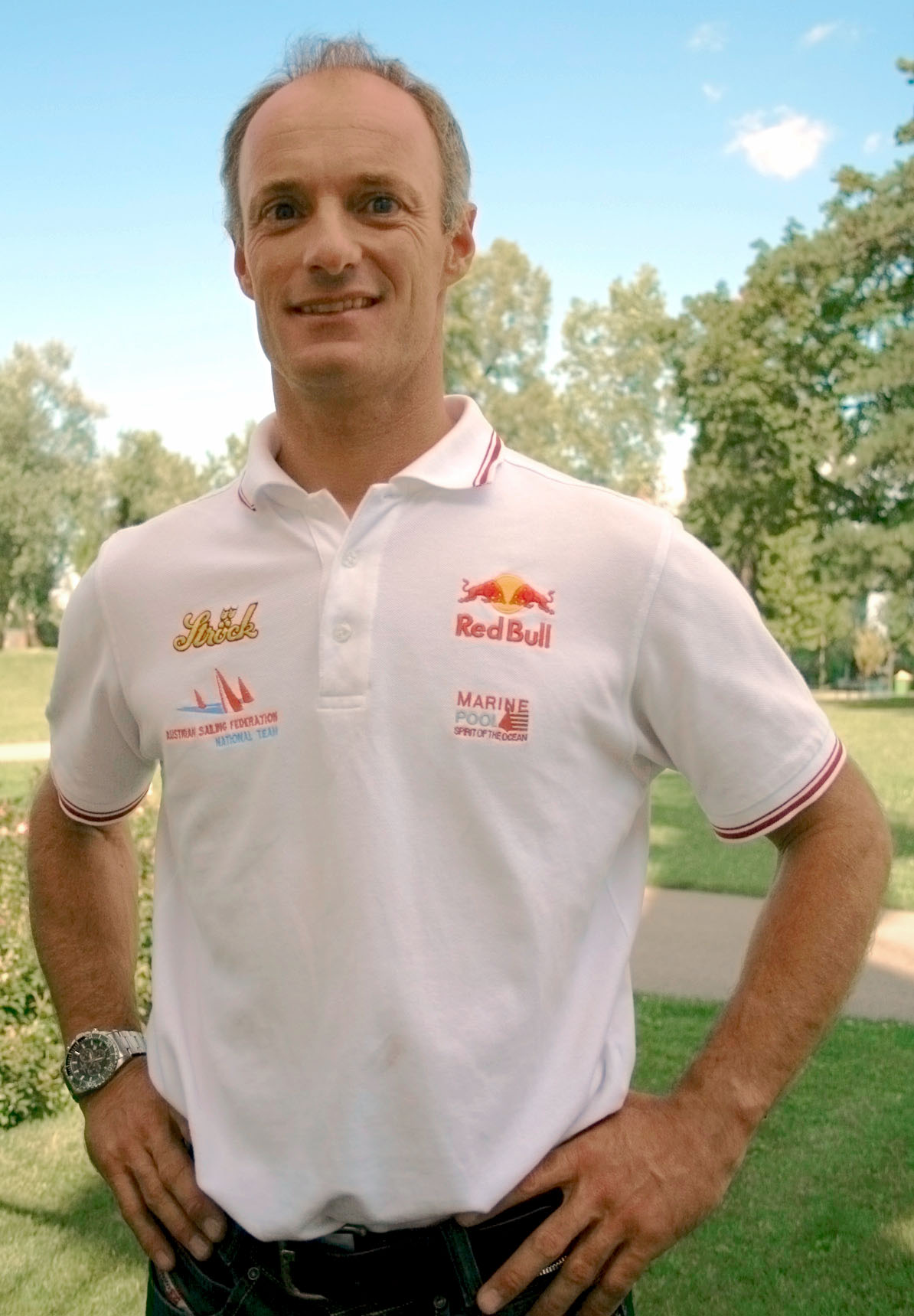

Personal information
- Nationality: Austrian
- Born: 9 September 1968 (age 57) Zell am See

Sport
- Sport: Sailing
Medal record
Sailing
Representing Austria
Event	1st	2nd	3rd
Olympic Games	2	0	0
World Championships	1	2	1
European Championships	4	2	0
Olympic Games
Gold medal – first place	2000 Sydney	Tornado
Gold medal – first place	2004 Athens	Tornado
World Championships
Gold medal – first place	1999 Vallensbæk	Tornado
Silver medal – second place	2000 Sydney	Tornado
Silver medal – second place	2001 Richards Bay	Tornado
Bronze medal – third place	2006 San Isidro	Tornado
European Championships
Gold medal – first place	1997 La Grande-Motte	Tornado
Gold medal – first place	2000 Alassio	Tornado
Gold medal – first place	2001 Silvaplana	Tornado
Gold medal – first place	2006 Travemünde	Tornado
Silver medal – second place	2003 Cagliari	Tornado
Silver medal – second place	2005 Västervik	Tornado

Hans-Peter Steinacher (born 9 September 1968 in Zell am See) is an Austrian sailor and Olympic champion. He won a gold medal in the Tornado class with Roman Hagara at the 2000 Summer Olympics in Sydney. They won the gold medal again at the 2004 Summer Olympics in Athens.

Along with his teammate Roman Hagara, he has won the Austrian Sports Personality of the Year twice, in 2000 and 2004.

In December 2021, Alinghi founder Ernesto Bertarelli and Hans-Peter Steinacher announced the launch of the new Alinghi Red Bull Racing. Bertarelli will continue to represent the Société Nautique de Genève, the yacht club for which they won the 2003 Louis Vuitton Cup, the 2003 America's Cup, and the 2007 America's Cup.

== America's Cup & Red Bull Youth America's Cup ==
Since 2009 he has focused more on the big boat scene with Roman Hagara, including competing on an America's Cup yacht at Hagara-Steinacher Racing (HS Racing) in the 2011–13 America's Cup World Series.

Under the flag of the United States for San Francisco's Golden Gate Yacht Club, the duo competed in a 2013 America's Cup World Series event in Naples, Italy. Racing this event gave the team firsthand experience in what has become Hagara and Steinacher's primary focus, mentoring the next generation of sailors on the next generation of sail boats: hydrofoils.

== Extreme Sailing Series ==
Hans-Peter Steinacher is currently also the tactician for Red Bull Extreme Sailing Team in the Extreme Sailing Series. With the series' announcement that foiling catamarans will be part of its future, Hagara and Steinacher have taken on a full crew of athletes who honed their skills in the Red Bull Youth America's Cup.

When the Extremes collapsed, the team made the move onto the GC32 Racing Tour with fellow ESS teams, Alinghi and Oman Air. They finished third overall in the 2019 season, behind their ESS rivals. In 2020, Steinacher and Hagara announced that the year's season would be their last.

== Mentoring Young Talents ==
As of 2015, Hans-Peter Steinacher and Roman Hagara mentor young sailors in three series: as sports directors of Red Bull Foiling Generation and the Red Bull Youth America's Cup, and as leaders of the Red Bull Extreme Sailing Team that competes in the Extreme Sailing Series. Hagara and Steinacher look for the best and most talented sailors in their respective age groups to give them insights and show them a new way of sailing.

== Background ==
Originally a ski racer, Hans-Peter Steinacher moved into sailing at the age of 17, where he took full advantage of the skills learned on the snow. Back then, he competed against his now teammate Roman Hagara. For years, the now teammates competed against each other until they decided in 1997 to train for the 2000 Olympics together. Before 1997 Hans-Peter Steinacher was helming a tornado catamaran, now he is the team's tactician. In the 2000 Olympics, the team was the very first to work with customized sails. “In doing this we actually created a new style of how to sail a boat,” Steinacher is cited. Since then, they have always focused on being ahead of technological developments, which now shows in their involvement in the foiling technology.

In his spare time, Hans-Peter Steinacher is also a licensed pilot.
