= Paul Goodison =

English sailor

Paul Goodison MBE
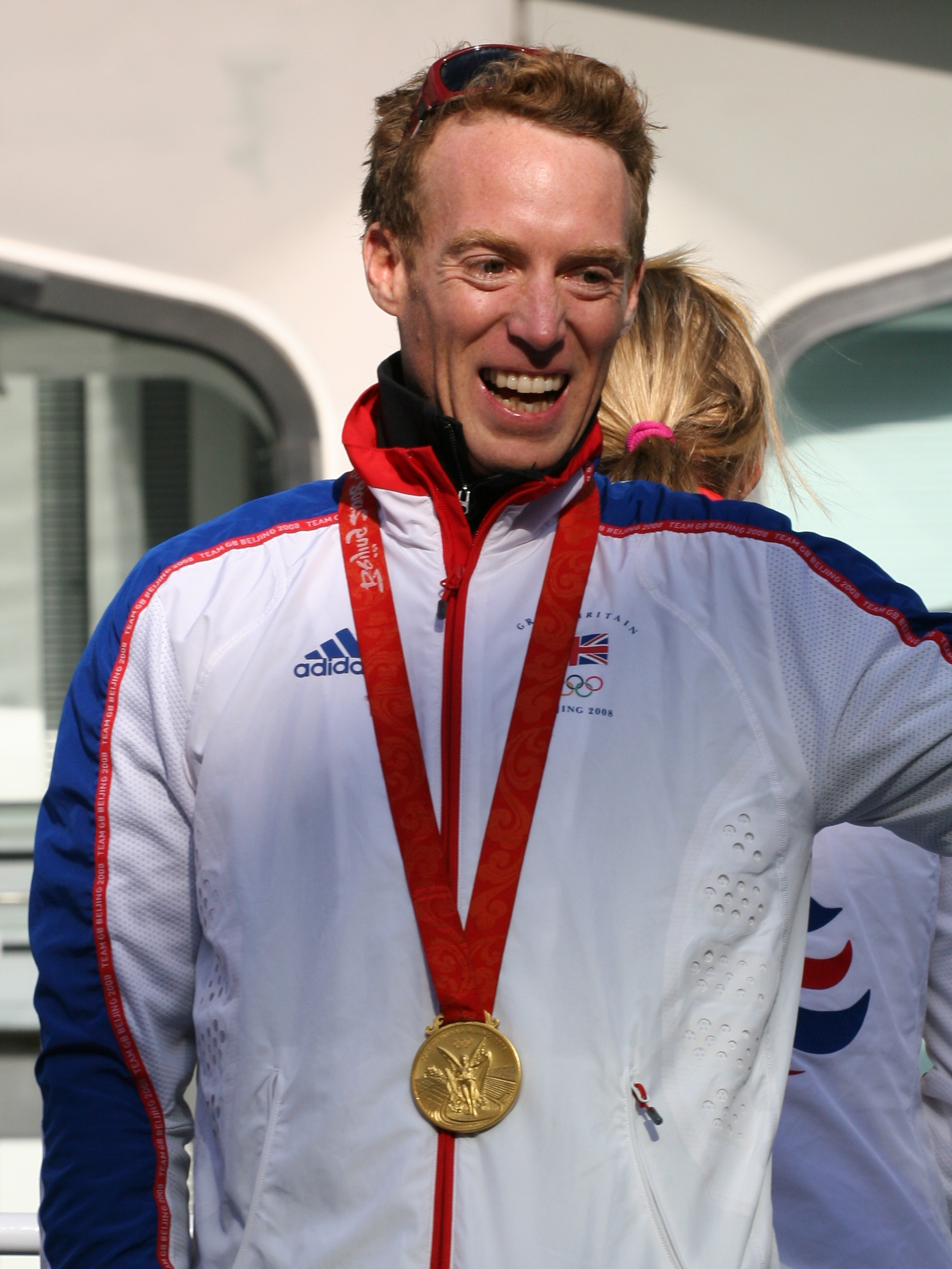
- Goodison at the parade in London to celebrate the achievements of British competitors at the 2008 Summer Olympics.

Personal information
- Nationality: British
- Born: 29 November 1977 (age 48) Brinsworth, Rotherham, South Yorkshire, UK
Medal record
Representing Great Britain
Sailing
Olympic Games
Gold medal – first place	2008 Beijing	Laser class
World Championships
Gold medal – first place	2009 Halifax	Laser class
Gold medal – first place	2012	Melges 32 class
Gold medal – first place	2014	Melges 20 class
Gold medal – first place	2016 Hayama	Moth class
Gold medal – first place	2017 Malcesine	Moth class
Gold medal – first place	2018 Bermuda	Moth class
Star Sailors League
Gold medal – first place	2017 Bahamas	Star class

Paul Martin Goodison MBE (born 29 November 1977) is a British, Olympic gold medal-winning sailor. He competed in the 2004, 2008, and 2012 Summer Olympics in the Laser, winning gold in 2008. Goodison learned to sail at Ulley Sailing Club near Sheffield.

== Background ==
He studied at Southampton Solent University completing an Undergraduate degree in Maritime Studies following his Olympic success he was awarded also awarded an Honorary Doctorate in Sports

== Sailing career ==
=== Laser class and Olympics ===
In March 2005, he was ranked 2nd in the world in the Laser, behind Robert Scheidt of Brazil, and ahead of Michael Blackburn of Australia and Mark Mendelblatt of the United States.

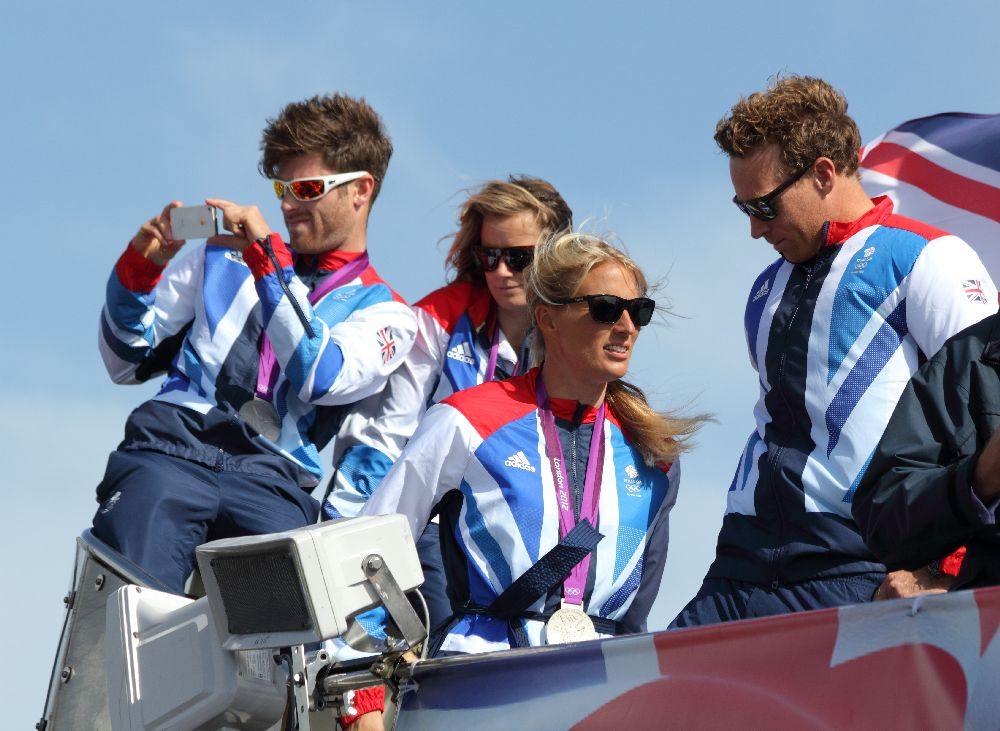
Luke Patience, Hannah Mills, Saskia Clark & Paul Goodison in the Olympic Parade at Weymouth & Portland in 2012

He won the gold medal in the Men's Laser class at the 2008 Summer Olympics. In 2009 he won the Laser World Championships, in Halifax, Canada. He also competed in the 2004 Summer Olympics, finishing 4th, and the 2012 Summer Olympics, finishing 7th.

=== Other World Championships ===
He has also won the following World Championships in Sailing:

- 1st 2012 Melges 32 World Championship
- 1st 2013 Melges 20 World Championship
- 1st 2016 Moth World Championship held in Hayama, Japan
- 1st 2017 Moth World Championship held in Malcesine, Italy (Lake Garda).
- 1st 2018 Moth World Championship held in Hamilton, Bermuda

=== America Cup ===
Goodison initially joined Artemis Racing for their 2017 Louis Vuitton Challenger’s Trophy campaign.

He then went to sail for New York Yacht Clubs – American Magic campaign in the 2021 America's Cup – Challenger Series where the team capsized compromising their campaign. Was also helmsman of their 2024 America's Cup campaign but was injured mid way through the Challenger Series in a none racing accident and had to be replaced.

== Awards ==
Goodison was appointed Member of the Order of the British Empire (MBE) in the 2009 New Year Honours for services to sport.
