= Laser 2 World Championship =

International sailing regatta

The Laser II World Championship was an annual international sailing regatta for Laser 2 two person dinghy, organized by the host club on behalf of the International Class Association and recognized by World Sailing, the sports IOC recognized governing body.

== Events ==
Editions	Date	Host			Sailors			Boats		Ref.
Editions	Year	Host club	Location	Nat.	Tot	Nat	Con	Boat	Mix	Ref.

== World Championships ==
Year	Gold	Silver	Bronze	Ref.
1989; Kingston CAN	Charlie Hancock (CAN); John Curtis (CAN)	Peter Katcha (USA); Mike Nunes (USA)	Thilo Giese (CAN); Trevor Davies (CAN)	
1991; Hayling GBR	Mark Mendelblatt (USA); Nick Cromwell (USA)	Jeremy McIntyre (CAN); Ward Cromwell (CAN)	Dimitri Berezkin (RUS); Eugeni Burmatnov (RUS)	
1993; ITA	Roger Ford (GBR); Suzi Ford (GBR)	Alex McMillan (GBR); Jonny Mears (GBR)	Peter Katcha (USA); John Mead (USA)	
1995; Sarasota USA	Peter Katcha (USA); Robert Dean (USA)	David AMES (USA); PJ BUHLER (USA)	Toshi SAKAMA (USA); Chris RUSSICK (USA)	
1997; Cork IRL	Mathew Davies (NZL); Nathan Handley (NZL)	Tom Fitzpatrick (IRL); David McHugh (IRL)	Robert Eason (IRL); J O’Callaghan (IRL)	
1999; Cork CAN; 89 Boats	CAN 7038; Pierre-Olivier Roy (CAN); James Sauter (CAN)	Kevin Teborek (USA); Ryan Donahue (USA)	Dalton Bergan (USA); Zachary Maxam (USA)	
2001; Pweilheli (GBR); 92 Boats	USA 9856; Kevin Teborek (USA); Ryan Donahue (USA)	GBR 10495; Andy Palmer-Felgate (GBR); Lee Sydenham (GBR)	GBR 10496; Graeme Bristow (GBR); Bryan Mobbs (GBR)	
2003; Hoom NED; 70 Boats	Noel Butler (IRL); Stephen Campion (IRL)	Kevin Teborek (USA); Ryan Donahue (USA)	Nigel Skudder (GBR); Keith Hills (GBR)	
2005; Kingston CAN	Trevor McEwen (CAN); Ian McEwen (CAN)	Alex Taylor (GBR); Bryan Mobbs (GBR)	Jason Kobrick (CAN); Andrew McEwen (CAN)	
2007; GER	Nigel Skudder (GBR); Keith Hills (GBR)	Lisa Buddemeier (GER); Matthias DÜWEL (GER)	Marian Scheer (GER); Daniel Scheer (GER)	
2009	Nigel Skudder (GBR); Keith Hills (GBR)	Lisa Buddemeier (GER); Matthias DÜWEL (GER)	Marian Scheer (GER); Daniel Scheer (GER)	
2011; Travemunder GER; 21 Boats	Lisa Buddemeier (GER); Matthias DÜWEL (GER)	Niels Krenz (GER); Christian GERDUM (GER)	Marian Christopher Scheer (GER); Daniel Scheer (GER)	
2013; Lake Como ITA; 16 Boats	GER 6883; Niels Krenz (GER); Christian Gerdum (GER)	GER 6885; Peter Kruse (GER); Arne Wittermer (GER)	GER 10591; Jan Morten Sevecke (GER); Matthias DÜWEL (GER)	

== Youth Sailing World Championships ==
The class was used by World Sailing for the Youth Sailing World Championships.

Year	Gold	Silver	Bronze
1993 - Male; Lake Garda ITA; Nations	Israel; Zeevi Kalach; Elad Ronen	Spain; Gustavo Doreste; Dimas Wood	New Zealand; Simon Cooke; Edward Smyth
1993 - Female; Lake Garda ITA; Nations	Great Britain; Storm Nuttal; Sally Cuthbert	New Zealand; Melinda Henshaw; Lisa Jack	Canada; Lindsay Staniforth; Alison Matthews
1994 - Male; Marathon GRE; 22 Nations	United States; David James; PJ Buhler	Brazil; Rodrigo Amado; Leonardo Santos	Australia; Justin Steel; Christian Stevens
1994 - Female; Marathon GRE; 15 Nations	Great Britain; Storm Nuttal; Sally Cuthbert	Australia; Briohny Hooper; Amanda Miller	New Zealand; Susie Wood; Jennifer Cheyne
1995 - Male; Hamilton BER; 21 Nations	Great Britain; Nick Rogers; Pom Green	United States; David James; PJ Buhler	Switzerland; Etienne Huter; Pierre Huter
1995 - Female; Hamilton BER; 13 Nations	Great Britain; Jessie Cuthbert; Sally Cuthbert	Netherlands; Barbara Snieders; Wynkhe Bodewes	Italy; Claudia Tosi; Frederica Meringolo
1996 - Male; Newport USA; 22 Nations	Netherlands; Mats Hellman; Dirk Jan Lucas	Great Britain; Chris Draper; Daniel Newman	Canada; Michael Bond; Michael Bassett
1996 - Female; Newport USA; 16 Nations	Great Britain; Jessie Cuthbert; Sally Cuthbert	New Zealand; Joanne Knight; Linda Dickson	Ireland; Laura Dillon; Ciara Peelo
