= Veal (disambiguation) =

Veal is the meat of young cattle.

Veal may also refer to:

- Veal (surname)
- Veal (band), Canadian musical group
- Veal School, historic building in Georgia, United States
