= Paul Manuel =

Dutch sailor (born 1967)

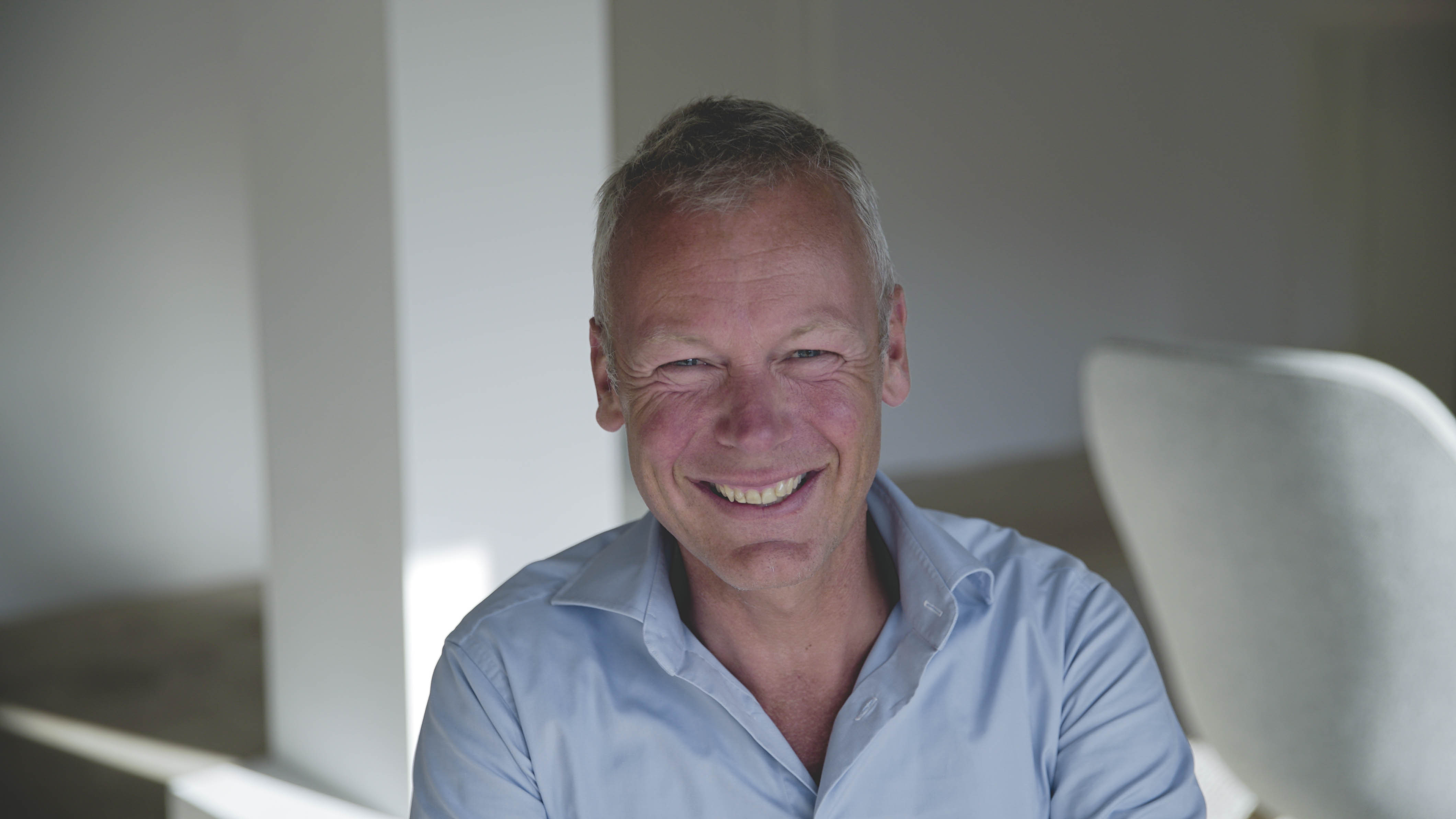

Personal information
- Full name: Paul Manuel
- Nationality: Dutch
- Born: 30 December 1967 (age 58) Delft
- Height: 1.84 m (6.0 ft)

Sailing career
- Sport: Sailing
- Class: Tornado
Competition record
Representing Netherlands
Olympic Games
6th	1992 Barcelona	Tornado
- Updated on 25 February 2014

Paul Manuel (born 30 December 1967 in Delft) is a sailor from the Netherlands who represented his country at the 1992 Summer Olympics in Barcelona. Manuel, as crew in the Dutch Tornado with Ron van Teylingen as helmsman, took 6th place.

== TamTam ==
Paul studied commercial engineering at the Haagse Hogeschool. In 1995 he and his brother Bart Manuel founded TamTam, a full-service digital agency that aims to, “create awesome digital experiences that make people smile”.

TamTam grew steadily along with the digital market up until 2007, when it reformulated its ambitions and set out to become one of the top three digital agencies in The Netherlands. It did so in 2012 and then aimed to expand its activities internationally.

In the following years TamTam acquired several international clients. In 2015 it entered a new phase in this process by closing a deal with Waterland, a private equity firm that was looking for a digital agency to invest in. TamTam became the launching platform for a buy-and-build strategy. The deal opened up many possibilities and soon deals were made with other companies that added their specialism to the digital mix.

== Dept ==
In 2016, Paul and Bart co-founded Dept, an international network of leading digital agencies.

Dept aims to bring together expert agencies that help build brands, campaigns, experiences, digital products and services. To maintain their identity, the individual agencies operate under their own name, with the addition of ‘A part of Dept’, indicating they are components of a larger, international whole.

At the moment Dept has offices in both Europe and the US.
