= João Carlos Jordão =

Brazilian sailor

Personal information
- Born: 23 June 1962 (age 63) Niterói, Brazil

Sport
- Sport: Sailing

João Carlos Jordão (born 23 June 1962) is a Brazilian sailor. He competed in the Tornado event at the 2004 Summer Olympics.
