= Khristos Garefis =

Greek sailor

Personal information
- Nationality: Greek
- Born: 7 April 1955 (age 69)

Sport
- Sport: Sailing

Khristos Garefis (born 7 April 1955) is a Greek sailor. He competed in the Tornado event at the 2004 Summer Olympics.
