= Veal (surname) =

Veal is an English surname, arriving to England from the Norman conquest in 1066. Notable people with the surname include:

- Coot Veal (1932–2021), American baseball player
- Demetrin Veal (born 1981), American football player
- Donnie Veal (born 1984), American baseball player
- Jack Veal (born 2007), Child actor
- Jennifer Veal (born 1991), English actress
- Kristen Veal (born 1981), Australian basketball player
- Rohan Veal (born 1977), Australian sailor
