= Sailing at the 2004 Summer Olympics – Tornado =

Mixed Tornado at the Games of the XXVIII Olympiad
- Line drawing of the Tornado
- Venue: Agios Kosmas Olympic Sailing Centre
- Dates: First race: 21 August 2004; Last race: 28 August 2004
- Competitors: 35 from 17 nations

Medalists
1st place, gold medalist(s)		Roman Hagara; Hans-Peter Steinacher	Austria
2nd place, silver medalist(s)		John Lovell; Charlie Ogletree	United States
3rd place, bronze medalist(s)		Santiago Lange; Carlos Espínola	Argentina

The Mixed Tornado was a sailing event on the Sailing at the 2004 Summer Olympics program in Agios Kosmas Olympic Sailing Centre. Eleven races were scheduled and completed with one discard. 35 sailors, on 17 boats, from 17 nation competed.

== Race schedule ==
●	Practice races	●	Competition day	●	Last day of racing

Date	August																	
Date	12 Thu	13 Fri	14 Sat	15 Sun	16 Mon	17 Tue	18 Wed	19 Thu	20 Fri	21 Sat	22 Sun	23 Mon	24 Tue	25 Wed	26 Thu	27 Fri	28 Sat	29 Sun
Mixed Tornado	●	●								● ●	● ●	● ●	Spare day	● ●	● ●	Spare day	●	

== Final results ==
Rank	Country	Helmsman	Crew	Race 1		Race 2		Race 3		Race 4		Race 5		Race 6		Race 7		Race 8		Race 9		Race 10		Race 11		Total	Total – discard
Rank	Country	Helmsman	Crew	Pos.	Pts.	Pos.	Pts.	Pos.	Pts.	Pos.	Pts.	Pos.	Pts.	Pos.	Pts.	Pos.	Pts.	Pos.	Pts.	Pos.	Pts.	Pos.	Pts.	Pos.	Pts.	Total	Total – discard
1st place, gold medalist(s)	Austria	Roman Hagara	Hans-Peter Steinacher	1	1.0	3	3.0	8	8.0	1	1.0	~~14~~	~~14.0~~	8	8.0	4	4.0	1	1.0	2	2.0	5	5.0	1	1.0	48.0	34.0
2nd place, silver medalist(s)	United States	John Lovell	Charlie Ogletree	2	2.0	2	2.0	1	1.0	6	6.0	9	9.0	9	9.0	6	6.0	7	7.0	1	1.0	2	2.0	~~10~~	~~10.0~~	55.0	45.0
3rd place, bronze medalist(s)	Argentina	Santiago Lange	Carlos Espínola	7	7.0	1	1.0	6	6.0	5	5.0	6	6.0	~~11~~	~~11.0~~	5	5.0	8	8.0	4	4.0	3	3.0	9	9.0	65.0	54.0
4	France	Olivier Backes	Laurent Voiron	4	4.0	~~12~~	~~12.0~~	11	11.0	2	2.0	5	5.0	4	4.0	11	11.0	5	5.0	5	5.0	8	8.0	2	2.0	69.0	57.0
5	Netherlands	Mitch Booth	Herbert Dercksen	11	11.0	5	5.0	10	10.0	4	4.0	4	4.0	3	3.0	1	1.0	10	10.0	6	6.0	7	7.0	~~17~~	~~17.0~~	78.0	61.0
6	Australia	Darren Bundock	John Forbes	9	9.0	7	7.0	12	12.0	11	11.0	1	1.0	2	2.0	3	3.0	4	4.0	12	12.0	1	1.0	~~14~~	~~14.0~~	76.0	62.0
7	Puerto Rico	Enrique Figueroa	Jorge Hernández	5	5.0	9	9.0	7	7.0	8	8.0	2	2.0	5	5.0	9	9.0	12	12.0	~~14~~	~~14.0~~	10	10.0	5	5.0	86.0	72.0
8	Spain	Fernando Echávarri	Antón Paz, Iván Pastor	3	3.0	4	4.0	13	13.0	RDG	8.8	~~18~~	~~18.0~~	6	6.0	2	2.0	6	6.0	7	7.0	13	13.0	12	12.0	92.8	74.8
9	Russia	Andrey Kirilyuk	Valery Ushkov	15	15.0	13	13.0	5	5.0	10	10.0	3	3.0	1	1.0	7	7.0	11	11.0	3	3.0	~~17~~	~~17.0~~	8	8.0	93.0	76.0
10	Italy	Francesco Marcolini	Edoardo Bianchi	~~18~~	~~18.0~~	6	6.0	3	3.0	7	7.0	11	11.0	16	16.0	10	10.0	2	2.0	8	8.0	9	9.0	6	6.0	96.0	78.0
11	Germany	Roland Gäbler	Gunnar Struckmann	6	6.0	8	8.0	~~15~~	~~15.0~~	3	3.0	13	13.0	10	10.0	13	13.0	9	9.0	10	10.0	11	11.0	11	11.0	109.0	94.0
12	Greece	Iordanis Paschalidis	Christos Garefis	12	12.0	10	10.0	2	2.0	9	9.0	10	10.0	7	7.0	~~16~~	~~16.0~~	13	13.0	15	15.0	14	14.0	3	3.0	111.0	95.0
13	Great Britain	Leigh McMillan	Mark Bulkeley	8	8.0	14	14.0	~~17~~	~~17.0~~	12	12.0	7	7.0	14	14.0	8	8.0	3	3.0	16	16.0	15	15.0	15	15.0	129.0	112.0
14	Sweden	Martin Strandberg	Kristian Mattsson	10	10.0	11	11.0	9	9.0	14	14.0	~~15~~	~~15.0~~	15	15.0	15	15.0	14	14.0	9	9.0	12	12.0	4	4.0	128.0	113.0
15	Canada	Oskar Johansson	John Curtis	14	14.0	15	15.0	4	4.0	13	13.0	8	8.0	12	12.0	14	14.0	~~17~~	~~17.0~~	17	17.0	4	4.0	13	13.0	131.0	114.0
16	Portugal	Diogo Cayolla	Nuno Barreto	~~DNC~~	~~18.0~~	16	16.0	14	14.0	16	16.0	12	12.0	13	13.0	12	12.0	15	15.0	11	11.0	6	6.0	7	7.0	140.0	122.0
17	Brazil	Mauricio Oliveira	Joäo Carlos Jordäo	13	13.0	~~17~~	~~17.0~~	16	16.0		15.0	16	16.0	17	17.0	17	17.0	16	16.0	13	13.0	16	16.0	16	16.0	172.0	155.0

Legend: DNC – Did not come to the starting area; RDG – Redress given;
Discard is crossed out and does not count for the overall result.

== Daily standings ==
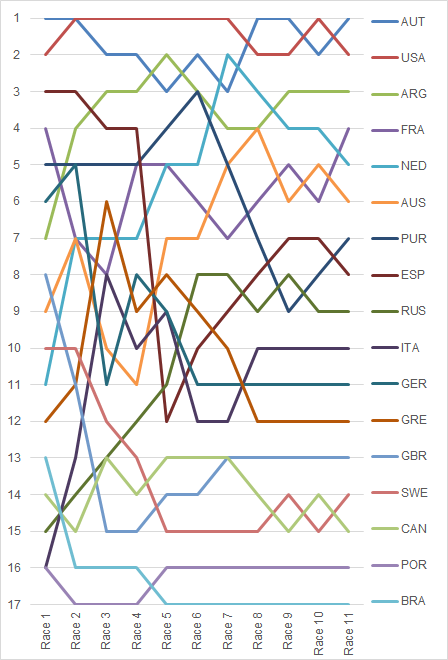
Graph showing the daily standings in the Women's 470 at the 2004 Summer Olympics
