= Ron van Teylingen =

Dutch sailor (born 1967)

Personal information
- Full name: Ronald Nico van Teylingen
- Nationality: Dutch
- Born: 28 July 1967 (age 58) Boskoop
- Height: 1.76 m (5.8 ft)

Sport

Sailing career
- Class: Tornado
- Updated on 25 February 2014

Ronald Nico "Ron" van Teylingen (born 28 July 1967, in Boskoop) is a sailor from the Netherlands, who represented his country at the 1992 Summer Olympics in Barcelona. Van Teylingen as helmsman in the Dutch Tornado with Paul Manuel as the crew took the 6th place. Four years later at the 1996 Olympics in Savannah with crew Herbert Dercksen Van Teylingen took 9th place again in the Tornado.
