= Herbert Dercksen =

Dutch sailor (born 1973)

Personal information
- Full name: Herbert Willem Constant Dercksen
- Nationality: Dutch
- Born: 1 March 1973 (age 53) Gouda
- Height: 1.65 m (5.4 ft)

Sailing career
- Sport: Sailing
- Club: Rotterdamsche Zeilvereeniging
- Class: Tornado
Competition record
Representing Netherlands
World Championships
Bronze medal – third place	2002	Tornado
European Championships
Gold medal – first place	2004	Tornado
Silver medal – second place	2002	Tornado
Bronze medal – third place	2005	Tornado
Dutch Championships
Gold medal – first place	1994	Men's Europe
- Updated on 14 February 2014

Herbert Willem Constant Dercksen (1 March 1973, Gouda) is a sailor from the Netherlands, who represented his country for the first time at the 1996 Summer Olympics in Savannah. Dercksen as crew in the Dutch Tornado with Ron van Teylingen as helmsman took the 9th place. In 2004 Dercksen returned to the Olympics in Athens. This time with Helmsman Mitch Booth Dercksen took 5th place in the Tornado.

== 1994 – 1998 ==
In 1994, Dercksen became Dutch champion in the Europe and a year later he won the Dutch title in the Tornado alongside Ron van Teylingen (helmsman). Their second Dutch championship together followed in 1997, while the team successfully defended their title in 1998. After that victory Dercksen switched to the Formula 18.

== 1999 – 2004 ==
In the Formula 18 class Dercksen partnered with Mitch Booth, an Australian who was nationality later was transferred to Dutch. They participated at the 1999 European Championships Formula 18 and won the title immediately. They also participate in the Australian national championships where the team took the Championship in 2000. That same year they became World champion Formula 18. They successfully defended their World title Formula 18 in 2001 and 2002 before they switched to the Olympic Tornado class. They took a bronze medal at the Tornado 2002 World Championship and a silver at the European Championship that same year. Besides participation in the 2004 Olympics. Booth & Dercksen won a silver medal at the 2004 F18 World Championship and a gold medal at the 2004 Tornado European Championship. In 2005 Booth and Dercksen won a bronze at the 2005 European Tornado Championship.

== End of the Olympic career ==
In 2006 both sailors decided to go their own way and participated at the 2006 Tornado World Championship. Dercksen managed to win the sixth race with his teammate Mischa Heemskerk and finishing 26th overall. Dercksen decided in early 2007 to end his career at the highest level of Catamaran sailing. Dercksen continues sailing in the Formula 18 class, however at a lower level.

== Professional life ==
- Founder & CEO: TNG SWISS WATCHES (1998–2010)
- Founder & CEO: TORNADOSPORT (2004–2010)
- CEO XTENDERS: (2008 – Present)
