= Gunnar Struckmann =

German sailor

Personal information
- Nationality: German
- Born: 16 August 1981 (age 43); Neustadt am Rübenberge, West Germany

Sport
- Sport: Sailing

Gunnar Struckmann (born 16 August 1981) is a German former sailor. He competed in the Tornado event at the 2004 Summer Olympics.
