= Glenn Ashby =

Australian sailor (born 1977)

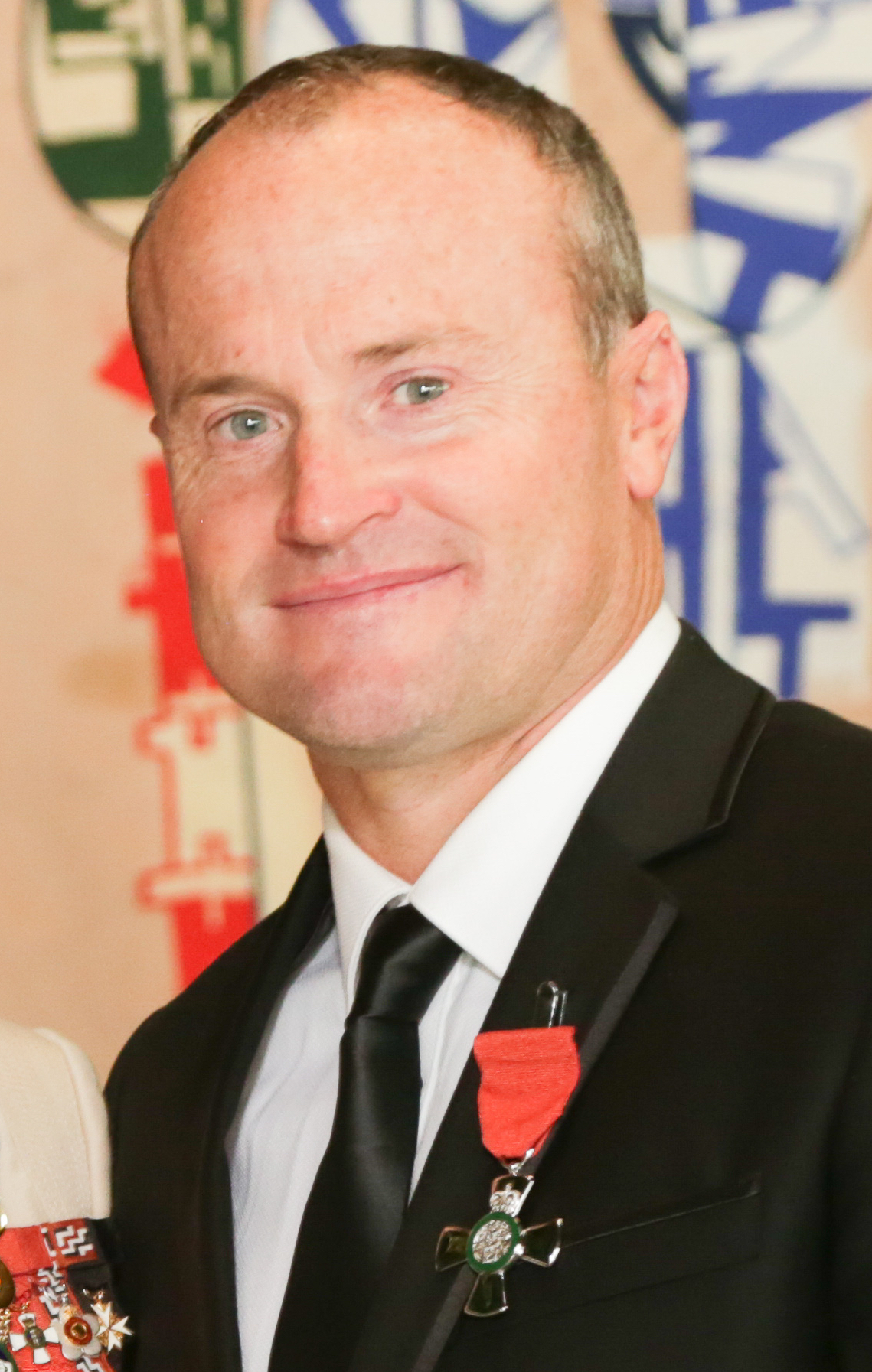
- Ashby in 2019

Personal information
- Full name: Glenn Thomas Ashby
- Born: 1 September 1977 (age 49) Bendigo, Victoria, Australia

Sailing career
- Sport: Sailing
Medal record
Sailing
Representing Australia
Olympic Games
Silver medal – second place	2008 Beijing	Tornado class
World Championships
Gold medal – first place	1996 L'Estartit	A-class
Gold medal – first place	2002 Martha's Vineyard	A-class
Gold medal – first place	2004 New Plymouth	A-class
Gold medal – first place	2004 Punta Ala	Formula 18
Gold medal – first place	2005 Hook of Holland	Formula 18
Gold medal – first place	2006 Västervik	A-class
Gold medal – first place	2006 San Isidro	Tornado
Gold medal – first place	2007 Queensland	Formula 18
Gold medal – first place	2007 Islamorada	A-class
Gold medal – first place	2008 Auckland	Tornado
Gold medal – first place	2009 Brescia	Tornado
Gold medal – first place	2009 Belmont	A Class
Gold medal – first place	2010 Cesenatico	A-class
Gold medal – first place	2014 Auckland	A-class
Gold medal – first place	2015 Punta Ala	A-class
Gold medal – first place	2018 Lake Garda	GC32 Class
Gold medal – first place	2018 Hervey Bay	A-class
Silver medal – second place	2000 Cesenatico	A-class
Silver medal – second place	2001 Castelldefels	A-class
Silver medal – second place	2005 Sanguinet	A-class
Silver medal – second place	2006 Hyères	Formula 18
Bronze medal – third place	2003 Koksijde	Formula 18
Bronze medal – third place	2025 Munster, WA	Formula 18

Glenn Thomas Ashby MNZM (born 1 September 1977) is an Australian sailor from Strathfieldsaye, a suburb of Bendigo, Victoria. He is a multiple multihull world champion.

== Background ==
Ashby grew up sailing with his brother and sister at Bendigo Yacht Club. Learning in a Northbridge Junior at around seven, his dad later took him on a Sabre. In 1996 at 18, Glenn went overseas for the first time in his life. Competing at the A-Class Worlds in Spain against 86 others, he won. He was an Australian Institute of Sport scholarship holder.

== Career ==
=== World Championships ===
He has won the following World Championships

- x10 A-Class Catamaran World Championship
- x3 Tornado World Championship
- x3 Formula 18 World Championship
- x1 GC32 World Championship

=== Olympics ===
Ashby and skipper Darren Bundock were the 2007 world champions in the Tornado class and ranked number one in the event going into the 2008 Summer Olympics. However, they were beaten by the Spanish team and won silver.

=== America Cup ===
He has been part of Team New Zealand as the wing trimmer for the 2013 America's Cup, the skipper of the 2017 America's Cup winners, Emirates Team New Zealand. and the mainsail trimmer for the 2021 America's Cup.

=== Sail GP ===
Ashby was called on by the Bonds Flying Roos SailGP Team to compete for the Australian team in the opening round of the 2026 SailGP season in Perth after a knee injury ruled Wing Trimmer Iain Jensen out of racing. The team finished 2nd in the event final.

Tom Slingsby's team called on Glenn Ashby again for the second event of the season in Auckland, where the team won the event final.

Ashby was named as a Reserve Athlete for the Australian team, and was on standby "on the chase boat in his gear ready to jump on if needed" for Jensen's return to racing in Sydney.

== Awards ==
In the 2019 New Zealand New Year Honours, Ashby was appointed a Member of the New Zealand Order of Merit, for services to sailing. He was inducted into the Australian Sailing Hall of Fame in 2025.
