= 12 Metre European Championship =

12 Metre European Championship is a European Championship sailing regatta in the 12 Metre class organised by the International 12 Metre Association.

== Editions ==
Year	City	Country	Dates	Athletes	Nations	Notes
2017	Flensburg	Germany	29 June – 2 July			

== Medalists ==
Year	Gold	Silver	Bronze
2017 Flensburg	Wings (FIN); Philipp Skafte-Holm	Trivia (GER); Wilfried Beeck	Vim (USA); Patrick Howaldt
