= Charlie Ogletree =

American sailor

Personal information
- Born: Charles S. Ogletree; October 11, 1967 (age 58) Greenville, North Carolina, U.S.
- Height: 5 ft 9 in (175 cm)

Sailing career
- Sport: Sailing
- College team: Old Dominion University
- Class: Tornado
Medal record
Men's sailing
Representing the United States
Olympic Games
Silver medal – second place	2004 Athens	Tornado class

Charles S. Ogletree (born October 11, 1967 in Greenville, North Carolina) is an American competitive sailor, collegiate All-American, four-time Olympian, and Olympic silver medalist.

== Career ==
Ogletree has competed in the 1996 Summer Olympics, 2000 Summer Olympics, 2004 Summer Olympics, and the 2008 Summer Olympics. At the 2004 Summer Olympics in Athens, Ogletree, along with his partner John Lovell, won a silver medal in the tornado class. Coincidentally, He shares the same exact birthday as John Lovell. Ogletree attended Tabor Academy preparatory school and graduated from Old Dominion University in 1989 with a BA of English. At Old Dominion University, Ogletree was an All-American and a key part of what is considered one of the best college sailing teams in history.
