= Valery Ushkov =

Russian sailor

Personal information
- Nationality: Russian
- Born: 30 December 1971 (age 53); Moscow, Russia

Sport
- Sport: Sailing

Valery Ushkov (born 30 December 1971) is a Russian sailor. He competed in the Tornado event at the 2004 Summer Olympics.
