= Mitch Booth =

Australian sailor

Personal information
- Full name: Mitchell Jay Booth
- Nickname: 'The Legend'
- Nationality: Australian /Dutch
- Born: 4 January 1963 (age 63) Sydney, Australia
- Height: 1.69 m (5 ft 7 in)

Sailing career
- Sport: Sailing
- Club: Pittwater, Palm Beach, Sydney, Australia; Rotterdamsche Zeilvereeniging; CV Palamós
- Class: Tornado
Medal record
Sailing
Representing Australia
Olympic Games
Silver medal – second place	1996 Atlanta	Tornado
Bronze medal – third place	1992 Barcelona	Tornado
Representing AUS / NED / ESP
World Championships in Sailing
Gold medal – first place	2021	Formula 18
Gold medal – first place	2017	Hobie Wildcat
Gold medal – first place	2015	Hobie Wildcat
Gold medal – first place	2010	Extreme 40
Gold medal – first place	2003	Hobie Tiger
Gold medal – first place	2002	Formula 18
Gold medal – first place	2001	Formula 18
Gold medal – first place	2000	Formula 18
Gold medal – first place	2003	Tornado
Gold medal – first place	1994	A-Class
Gold medal – first place	1992	Tornado
Gold medal – first place	1989	Tornado
European Championships
Gold medal – first place	2004	Tornado
Silver medal – second place	2002	Tornado
Bronze medal – third place	2005	Tornado
- Updated on 12 February 2014

Mitchell Jay "Mitch" Booth (born 4 January 1963, in Sydney) is a sailor of both Australian and Dutch nationality.

== Sailing career ==
=== Background ===
Booth started his sailing career at the age of four, when his mother taught him the basics on Pittwater. Alongside his father John (Jay) Booth won his first State Championship as a seven-year-old boy. His father honored his desire to skipper and compete in international competitions. His first break-through came at the age of seventeen, when finishing second in an Australian Championship. This achievement guaranteed his participation at the World Championship in the United States. From a fleet of over hundred boats representing nine countries, he and his crew went on to win the title. Since then Booth has made his life as a professional sailor. The projects have varied from Olympic sailing to Ocean racing and to keel boat racing. Off the water he has been involved in many sailing related activities including the creation of the current Olympic Tornado class Rig, design and build of A Class cats, the creation of Volvo Extreme 40, sailing Manager for America's cup team (1995) and technical adviser to ISAF.

=== Olympics ===
- 3rd 1992 Summer Olympics (ESP) with crew John Forbes (AUS)
- 2nd 1996 Summer Olympics (USA) with crew Andrew Landenberger (AUS)
- Coach 2000 Summer Olympics (AUS) for the Australian national team squad
- 5th 2004 Summer Olympics (GRE) with crew Herbert Dercksen (NED)
- 5th 2008 Summer Olympics (CHN) with crew Pim Nieuwenhuis (NED)

He represented his native country for the first time at the 1992 Summer Olympics in Barcelona. Booth as helmsman in the Australian Tornado with John Forbes as crew took Bronze. In 1996, Booth made a second appearance this time with crew member Andrew Landenberger the team took the Silver in the Tornado. In 2004, Athens Booth represented the Netherlands as helmsman of the Dutch Tornado. With crew member Herbert Dercksen Booth took 5th place. His final Olympic appearance came during the 2008 Summer Olympics in Qingdao. Now with crew member Pim Nieuwenhuis in the Dutch Tornado, Booth finished 5th.

=== Other ===
In total he took part in over 60 World Championships, becoming a 11 times World Champion with wins various multihull classes including the A-Class, Formula 18, Hobie Tiger, Hobie Wildcat, Tornado and Extreme 40. In the 50 national championships in which he took part he took the title a total of 13 times. He has won 23 out of 47 Australian State Championships in which he performed. He won eight European titles since becoming Dutch in sixteen starts.

== Awards and records ==
He has been named the 1992 Australian Yachtsman of the Year, the 1993 Caltex Sports Star finalist, three times NSW Yachtsman of the Year, the 1995 America's Cup sailing manager, the 1996 MMI Sports Star finalist, the 1996 Australian Yachtsman of the Year and the 2004 Dutch Sailor of the year. He was also crew member of the boats holding the previous World 24-hour distance record and Transatlantic (Cádiz to San Salvador) record holder (ClubMed) and the current Round Britain and Ireland record (PlayStation (yacht)).

Awards
Preceded by John Dransfield	Australian Yachtsman of the Year; 1991–1992; With: John Forbes	Succeeded by Syd Fischer
Preceded by David Adams	Australian Yachtsman of the Year; 1995–1996	Succeeded by Chris Nicholson & Daniel Phillips
