= Chris Rashley =

British sailor

Sailing career
- Sport: Sailing
Medal record
Representing Great Britain
Event	1st	2nd	3rd
World championships	2	2	0
European championships	5	1	0
European championships	6	6	0
Total	11	7	0
Sailing
World Championships
Silver medal – second place	2014 Hayling Island	International Moth
Silver medal – second place	2016 Hayama	International Moth
Gold medal – first place	2025 Azores	Wing Foil Open Masters
Gold medal – first place	2026 Silvaplana	Wing Foil Open Masters

Chris Rashley is a British sailor who finished second at the 2014 International Moth World Championships.

Chris Rashley began sailing the Nacra 17 Olympic multihull in 2016, and joined the British Sailing Team in 2017, competing internationally until 2019.

Having switched focus towards coaching in kite foiling and wing foiling, including working with Daniela Moroz for Paris 2024, Rashley won the WingFoil Racing Open Masters World Championship in The Azores in 2025, followed by a back-to-back win at the 2026 edition of the event in Lake Silvaplana.
