= John Curtis (sailor) =

Canadian sailor (born 1967)

Personal information
- Born: 9 July 1967 (age 59) Montreal, Quebec, Canada

Sport
- Sport: Sailing

John Curtis (born 9 July 1967) is a Canadian sailor. He competed in the Tornado event at the 2004 Summer Olympics.
