= John C. Lovell =

American sailor

Personal information
- Born: October 11, 1967 (age 58) Baton Rouge, Louisiana, U.S.
Medal record
Men's sailing
Representing the United States
Olympic Games
| Silver medal – second place | 2004 Athens | Tornado class |

John C. Lovell (born October 11, 1967) is an American competitive sailor, four-time Olympian, and Olympic silver medalist. He was born in Baton Rouge, Louisiana.

== Career ==
Lovell has competed in the 1996 Summer Olympics, 2000 Summer Olympics, 2004 Summer Olympics, and the 2008 Summer Olympics. At the 2004 Summer Olympics in Athens, Lovell, along with his partner Charlie Ogletree, won a silver medal in the Tornado class. Coincidentally, he and Ogletree have identical birthdays.
