= Rohan Veal =

Australian sailor (born 1977)

- Born: 17 January 1977 (age 49)
- Occupation: Sailor

Rohan Veal (born 17 January 1977) is a specialist in the International Moth Class dinghy. He was heavily involved in the class transition to the use of hydrofoils and campaigned to get the one design version of the moth the bladerider considered for the Olympics. He won the 2005 and 2007 Moth World Championship leading to him being shortlisted by the World Sailing for the ISAF World Sailor of the Year Awards.
