= Jorge Hernández (sailor) =

Puerto Rican sailor

Personal information
- Nationality: Puerto Rican
- Born: 20 June 1965 (age 59); San Juan, Puerto Rico
- Height: 167 cm (5 ft 6 in)
- Weight: 58 kg (128 lb)

Jorge Hernández (born 20 June 1965) is a Puerto Rican sailor. He and Quique Figueroa finished 7th in the Tornado event at the 2004 Summer Olympics.
