= European championships in sailing =

The European championships in sailing are a series of sailing championships in Europe organized or sanctioned by the European Sailing Federation (EUROSAF).

== List of championships ==
=== EUROSAF championships ===
Championship	Event	Venue	Current holder	Editions	Ref
EUROSAF Match Racing Open European Championship	Open	(Estonia) Tallinn	(France) Eric Monnin (2019)		
EUROSAF Match Racing Open Women's European Championship	Women	(Italy) Ledro	(France) Pauline Courtois (2019)		
EUROSAF Match Racing Open Youth European Championship	Open Youth	(Italy) Ledro	(Italy) Rocco Attili (2019)		
EUROSAF Youth Sailing Championships	Boys/Girls/Mixed		Champions in nine disciplines		

=== Class championships ===
==== Centreboard classes ====
Class	Championship	Event	Venue	Current holder	Editions	Ref
470	470 European Championships	Open	(Italy) Sanremo	(Australia) Belcher & Ryan (2019)		
470	470 European Championships	Men	(Italy) Sanremo	(Sweden) Dahlberg & Bergström (2019)		
470	470 European Championships	Women	(Italy) Sanremo	(France) Lecointre & Retornaz (2019)		
49er	49er & 49er FX European Championships	Open	(United Kingdom) Weymouth	(New Zealand) Burling & Tuke (2019)		
49er	49er & 49er FX European Championships	Men	(United Kingdom) Weymouth	(United Kingdom) Fletcher & Bithell (2019)		
49er FX	49er & 49er FX European Championships	Open	(United Kingdom) Weymouth	(Brazil) M. Grael & Kunze (2019)		
49er FX	49er & 49er FX European Championships	Women	(United Kingdom) Weymouth	(Netherlands) Bekkering & Duetz (2019)		
Finn	Finn European Championship	Men	(Greece) Athens	(United Kingdom) Giles Scott (2019)		
Laser	Laser European Championships	Men	(Portugal) Porto	(United Kingdom) Lorenzo Chiavarini (2019)		
Laser Radial	Laser European Championships	Men	(Portugal) Porto	(Poland) Aleksander Arian (2019)		
Laser Radial	Laser European Championships	Women	(Portugal) Porto	(Denmark) Anne Marie Rindom (2019)		

==== Keelboat classes ====
Class	Championship	Event	Venue	Current holder	Editions	Ref
12 Metre	12 Metre European Championship		(Sweden) Marstrand	(Denmark) VIM – Patrick Howaldt (2019)		
Dragon	Dragon European Championship			(Portugal) Andrade, Torres Pego & Nankin (2017)		
Soling	Soling European Championship			(Netherlands) Rudy den Outer, Theo de Lange & Ramzi Souli (2021)		
Soling	Soling European Match Racing Championship			no longer held		
Star	Star European Championship		(Italy) Riva del Garda	(Poland) Kusznierewicz & (Portugal) Melo (2019)		

==== Multihull classes ====
Class	Championship	Event	Venue	Current holder	Editions	Ref
Nacra 17	Nacra 17 European Championship	Mixed	(United Kingdom) Weymouth	(United Kingdom) Saxton & Boniface (2019)		

==== Board classes ====
Class	Championship	Event	Venue	Current holder	Editions	Ref
RS:X	RS:X European Championships	Men	(Spain) Mallorca	(Netherlands) Kiran Badloe (2019)	14 (2019)	
RS:X	RS:X European Championships	Women	(Spain) Mallorca	(Netherlands) Lilian De Geus (2019)	14 (2019)	
IQFoil	IQFoil European Championships	Men	(Switzerland) Silvaplana	(Netherlands) Kiran Badloe (2020)	1 (2020)	
IQFoil	IQFoil European Championships	Women	(Switzerland) Silvaplana	(France) Helene Noesmoen (2020)	1 (2020)	
