= Malcesine =

- Comune
- Comune di Malcesine
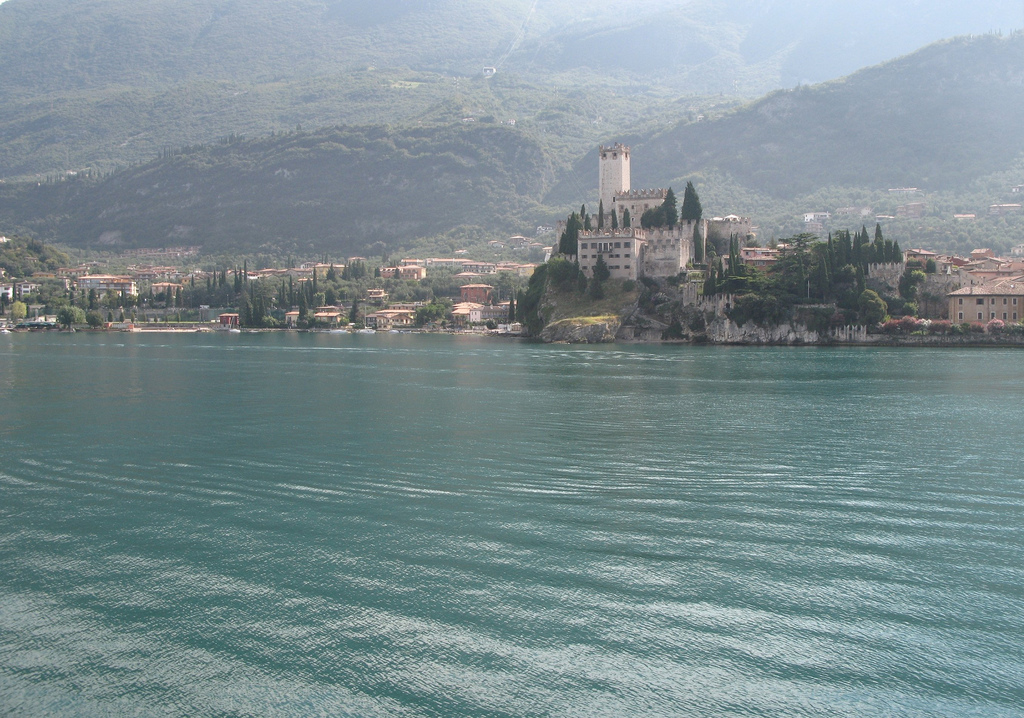

- Coat of arms

- Location within Italy Location within Veneto
- Coordinates: 45°46′N 10°49′E
- Country: Italy
- Region: Veneto
- Province: Verona (VR)
- Frazioni: Campagnola, Cassone, Navene, Val di Sogno

Government
  - Mayor: Giuseppe Benamati

Area
  - Total: 68.2 km^{2} (26.3 sq mi)
- Elevation: 89 m (292 ft)

Population (31 December 2020)
  - Total: 3,616
  - Density: 53.0/km^{2} (137/sq mi)
- Demonym: Malcesinesi
- Time zone: UTC+1 (CET)
  - Summer (DST): UTC+2 (CEST)
- Postal code: 37018, frazioni 37010
- Dialing code: 045
- Website: Official website

Malcesine is a comune (municipality) on the eastern shore of Lake Garda in the Province of Verona in the Italian region Veneto, located about 120 kilometres (75 miles) northwest of Venice and about 40 kilometres (25 miles) northwest of Verona. It is one of I Borghi più belli d'Italia ("The most beautiful villages of Italy").

== Geography and divisions ==
The comune of Malcesine consists of (from north to south) Navene, Campagnola, Malcesine proper, Val di Sogno and Cassone. It stretches along the Via Gardesana Orientale (Strada Statale 249) and is nestled between Lake Garda and the slopes of Monte Baldo. Malcesine is the northernmost comune on the Veneto shore of the lake, immediately to its north lies Trentino Alto Adige.

Two of the largest islands of Lake Garda are located in Malcesine: The Isola di sogno and the Isola dell'olivo (or Isola degli olivi).

== History ==
The first recorded inhabitants of the area were Etruscans dating to around 500 BC. After 15 BC, with Tiberius' victory over the Rhaetians, the area came under the control of the Roman Empire. After the fall of Rome, the area was ruled in turn by Ostrogoths, Alemanni and then the Langobards.

Between the 5th and 6th centuries the Langobards built a castle on the rock where the Castello Scaligero stands today. It was destroyed in 590 by the Franks. They subsequently rebuilt it and in 806 hosted King Pepin. After attacks by Hungarians the castle became part of the holdings of the Bishop of Verona. In 1277, the castle fell to Alberto della Scala and until 1387 remained in the possession of the della Scala family, whose name it still bears. Over the next centuries, castle and town were ruled in succession by the Visconti of Milan (until 1403) and the Republic of Venice (1405-1797). The control of Venice was only interrupted by a brief period (1506–16), when the area was under Imperial rule during the reign of Emperor Maximilian I.

In 1797-98, the area was occupied by the forces of Napoleon Bonaparte after which the Veneto became part of the Austrian Empire. In 1866, Malcesine became part of the Kingdom of Italy.

== Origins of the name ==
The first appearance of the toponym dates back to 9 September 844, when the term Manessicelles results in the testament of the Archdeacon Pacific with the meaning, according to Borsatti, of the tombs of the dead: this meaning would be corroborated by the discovery of some Etruscan-style burials in the surroundings up area. Over the centuries there are many documentary variants: Manascicines (932), Malesicine (1023), Malesisicis (1154), Malesisinum (1159), Malasilice (1225), Malsexeno (1422), Malsesene (1611) to name but a few of the Maffezzoli. The etymology of the toponym is however uncertain, revolving around the interpretation of Malae silices or Mala silex as "Stone hostile" or "Bad stone", probably referring to the morphology of the territory characterized by steep mountains rising on the lake, or as "Bad paved road" of Roman origin.

== Main sights ==
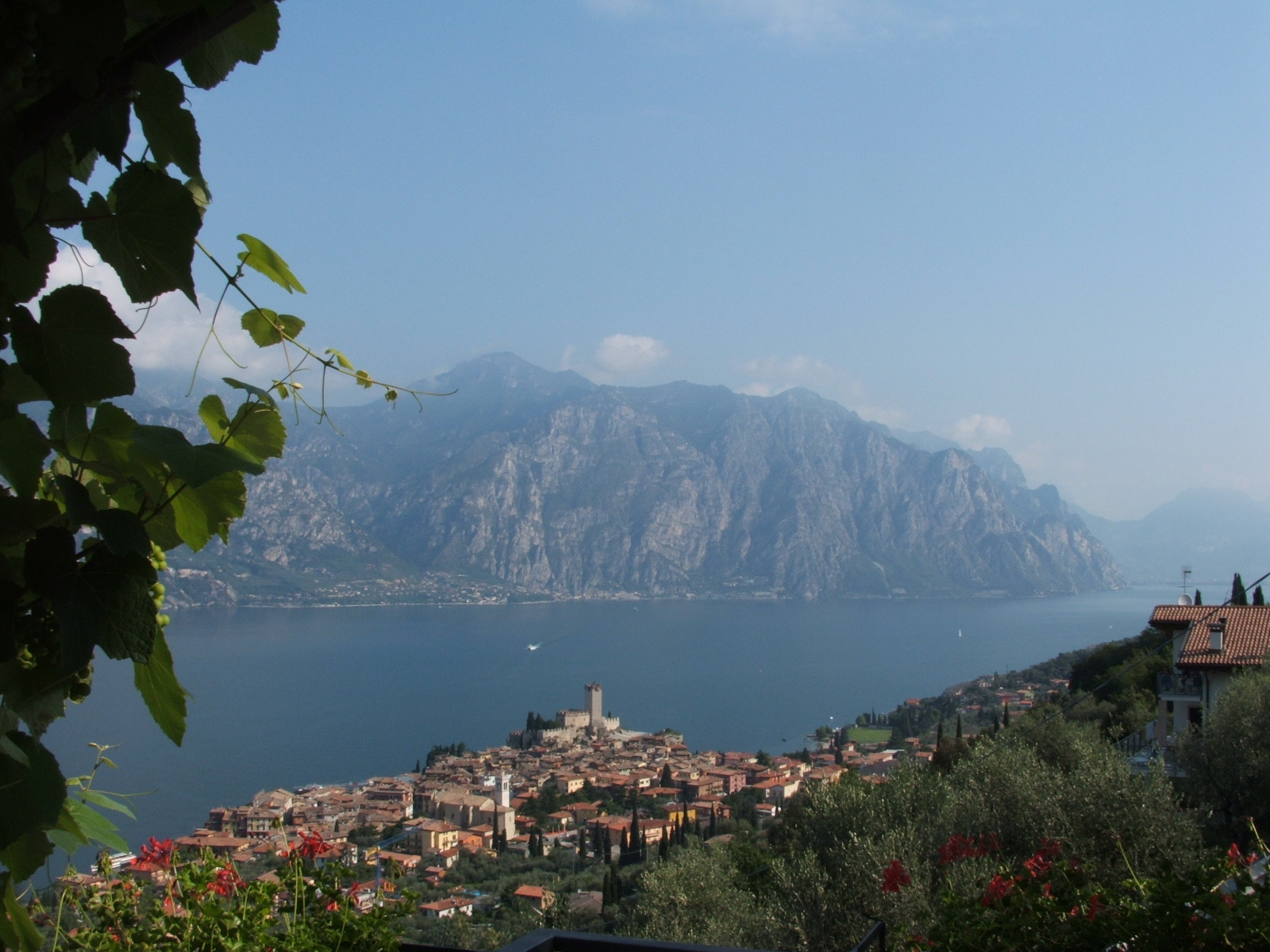
View of Malcesine on lake Garda, with church of St. Stephen and Castello Scaligero, and Limone sul Garda on opposite shore.

=== Castello Scaligero ===
Malcesine's most prominent landmark is the Castello Scaligero, which has 13th-century fortifications and an older medieval tower in white natural stone. Like the castle of Sirmione at the southern end of the lake, it is named for the della Scala family of Verona who ruled the region in the 13th and 14th centuries, and has the characteristic swallow-tail Ghibelline merlon crenellations. Remnants of an Etruscan tomb have been found within the castle walls. Most of the structures visible today date to the period of the della Scala. The bell of the castle was cast in 1442 and it is still in service.

In September 1786, Johann Wolfgang Goethe was questioned by the local magistrate on suspicion of being an Austrian spy after drawing sketches of the castle, and recalled the incident in his published travel report Italienische Reise (Italian Journey). During the period of Austrian rule, which ended in 1866 after the Third Italian War of Independence, major renovation work took place inside the castle. The Austrians turned it into a military garrison and the munition store they constructed was later used by the Guardia di Finanza of the Kingdom of Italy as a prison. Since 1902, the castle has been a national monument.

Today, the castle contains a small museum on the natural history of Lake Garda (Museo del Garda) and Monte Baldo (Museo del Baldo). One room in the Austrian powder magazine is dedicated to Goethe and his visit.

=== Palazzo dei Capitani ===
Located on the lake shore is the Palazzo dei Capitani. It was constructed by the Scala family between the 13th and 14th centuries on older Roman and Romanesque remains. After being reduced to a simple shell, possibly in an earthquake or by a fire, the building became the property of Francesco Mercanti, from Verona and he passed it on to his heirs. On 18 December 1473, it was sold to Alessandro Miniscalchi. By 1477, the building was already remodelled in the Venetian style. In 1618, Verona purchased the building on the behest of the Republic of Venice for use as the residence of the official called Capitano del Lago. Various further remodelling work followed. The Capitano was the head of the Gardesana dell'Acqua, a regional autonomous territory under Venetian rule.

On 20 March 1854, the comune of Verona effectively ceded the property to the comune of Malcesine and in 1897, Malcesine became the sole owner. It has been a national monument since 1902. Today, it is used for exhibitions and events and also houses the public library.

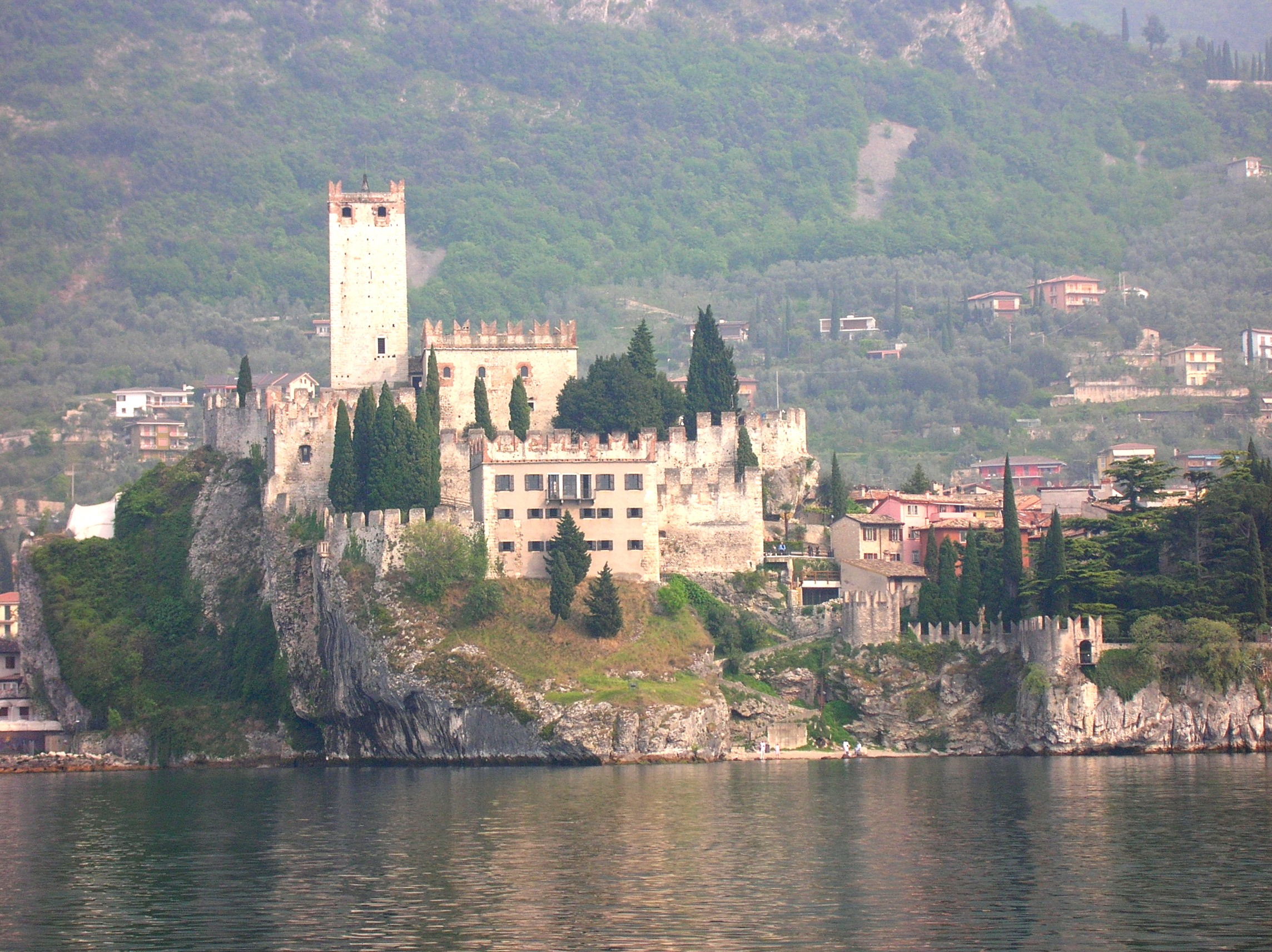
Castello Scaligero, Malcesine.

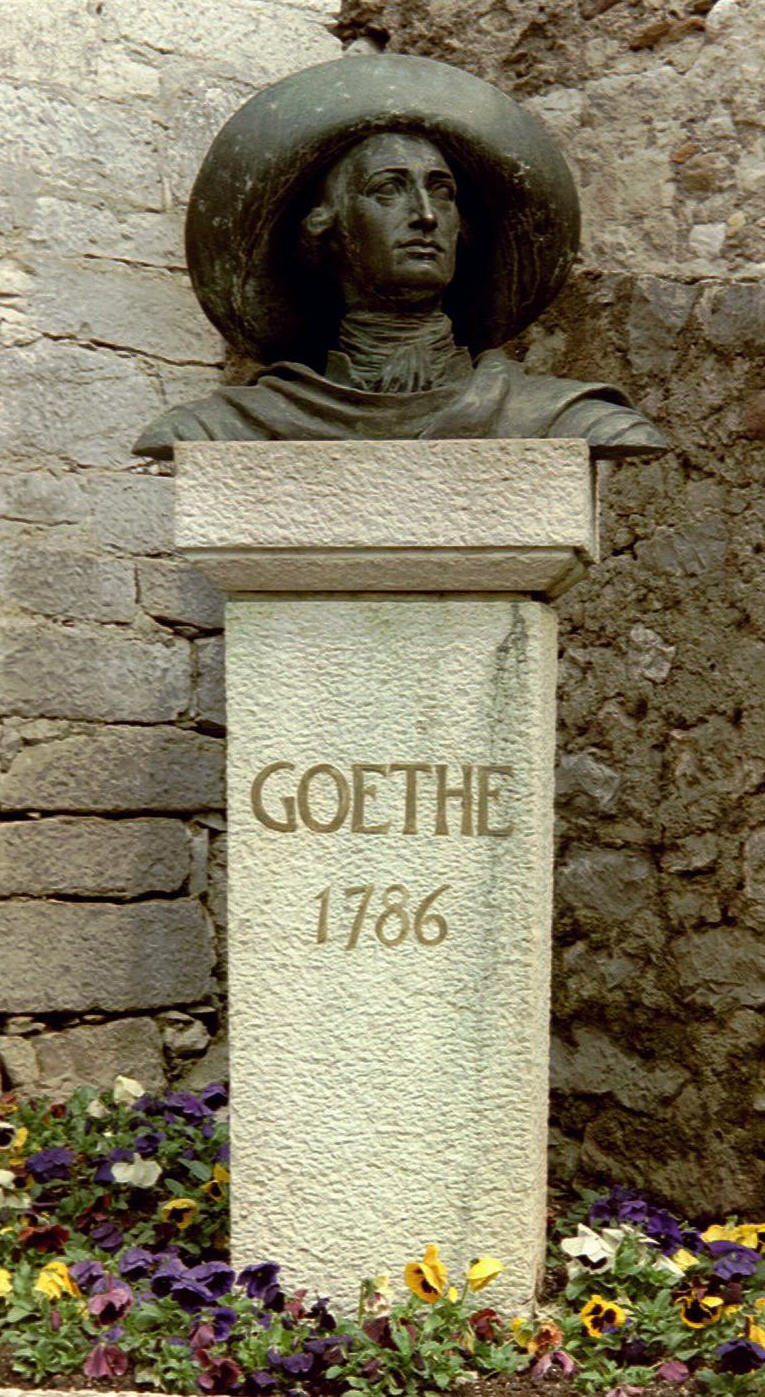
Goethe Memorial, Malcesine.

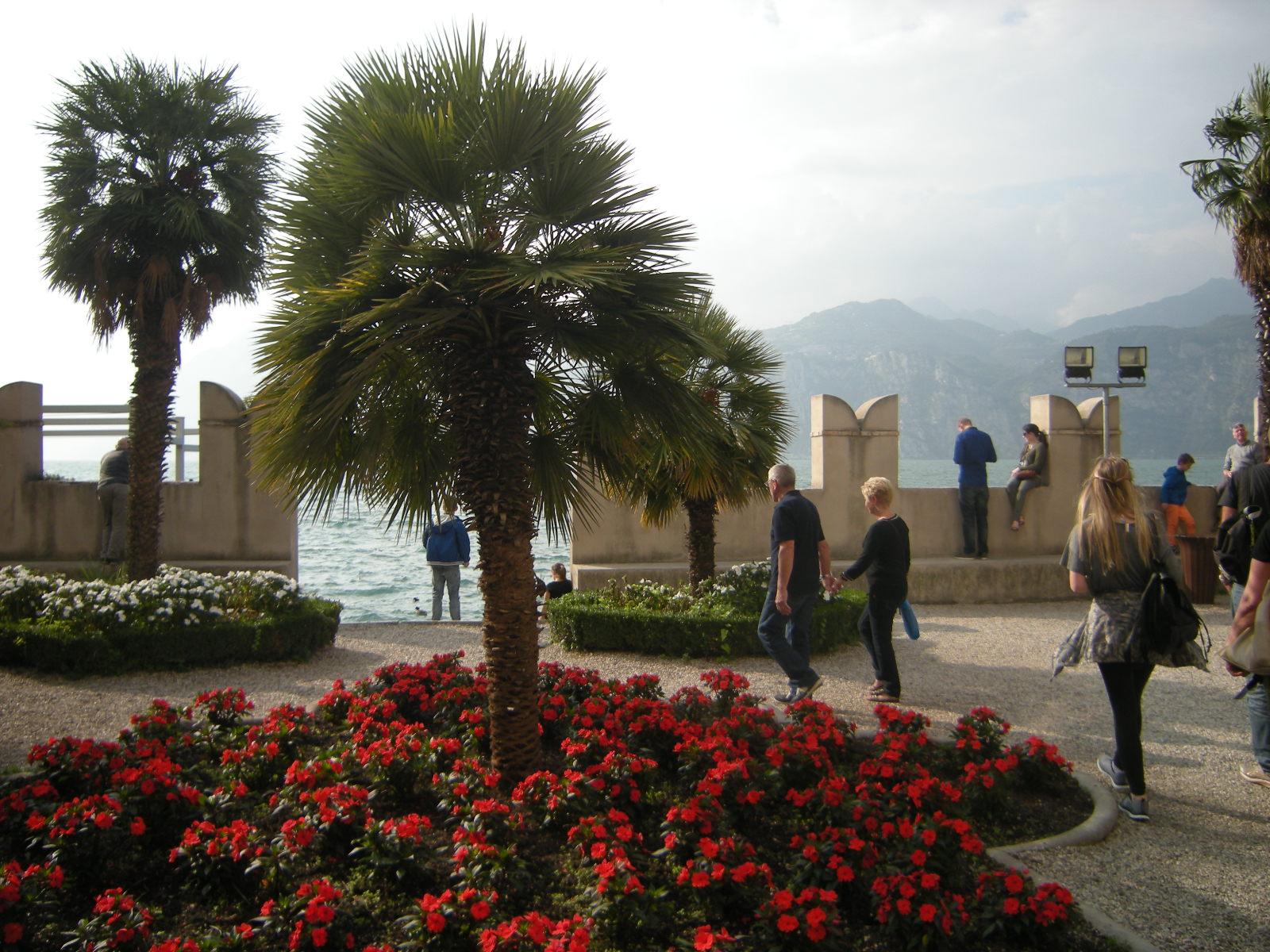
Garden of the Palazzo dei Capitani, Malcesine.

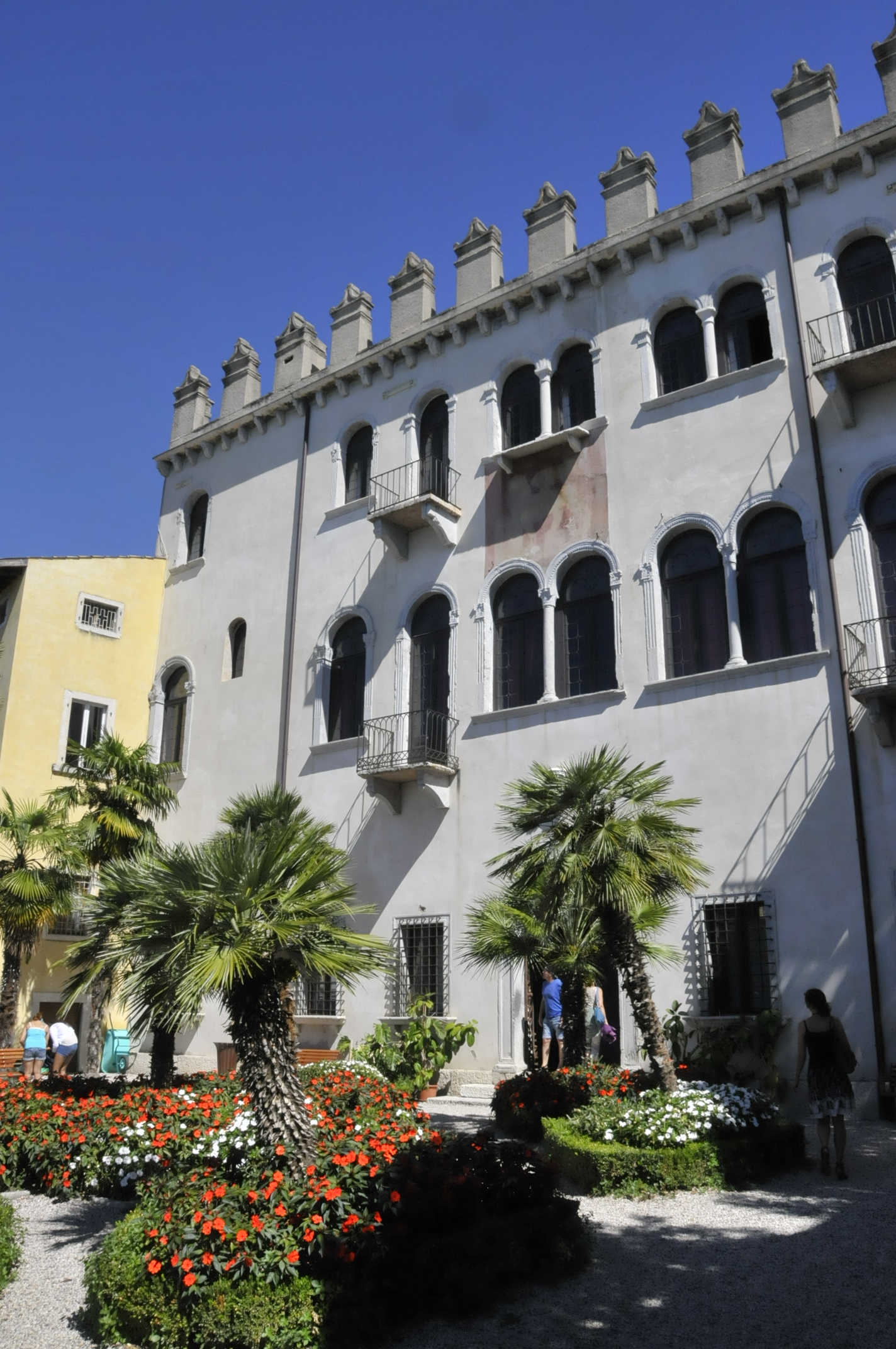
Palazzo dei Capitani, Malcesine.

=== Monte Baldo ===
Behind Malcesine rises the 2,218 m (7,277 ft) high Monte Baldo. A two-stage cable car ride—the second leg using one with rotating cabins—takes passengers to 1,750 m (5,741 ft) above sea level. From there the highest point can be accessed by walking a few kilometres to the south along the ridge.

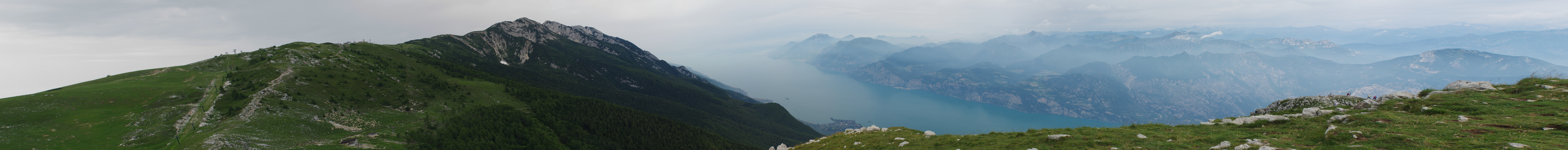
Garda Lake from Baldo Mountain at Comune of Malcesine

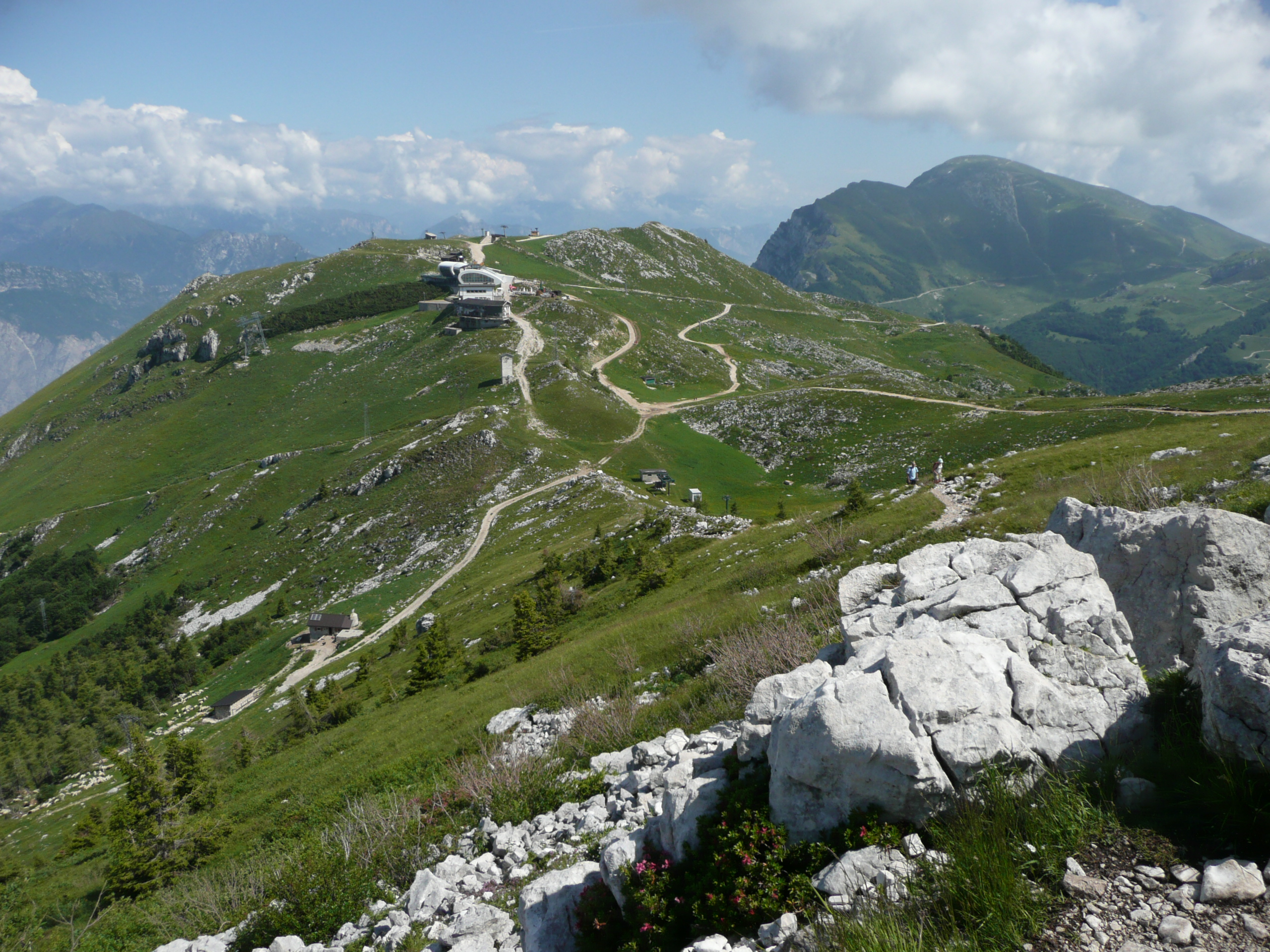
Cablecar from Malcesine to Monte Baldo. Top Station, ca. 1700m

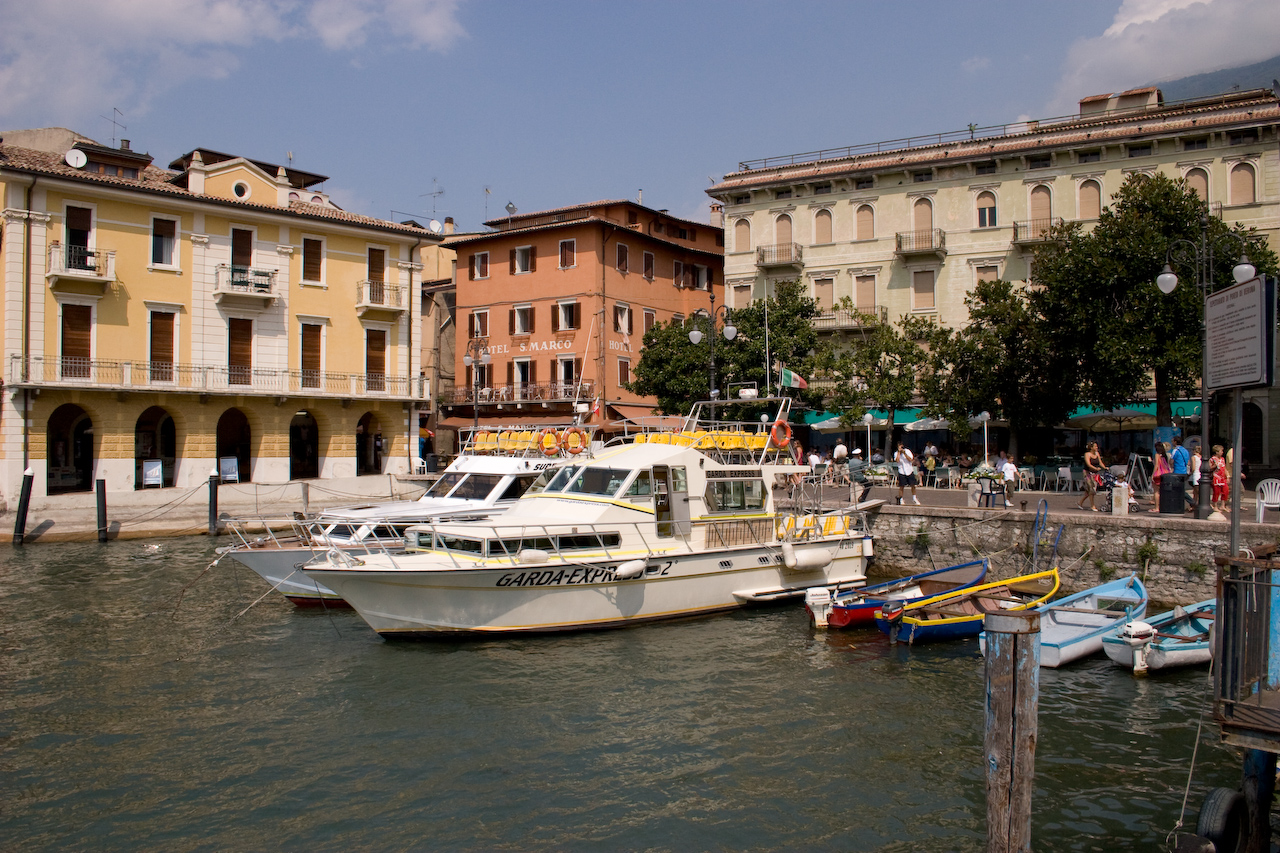
Malcesine harbour.

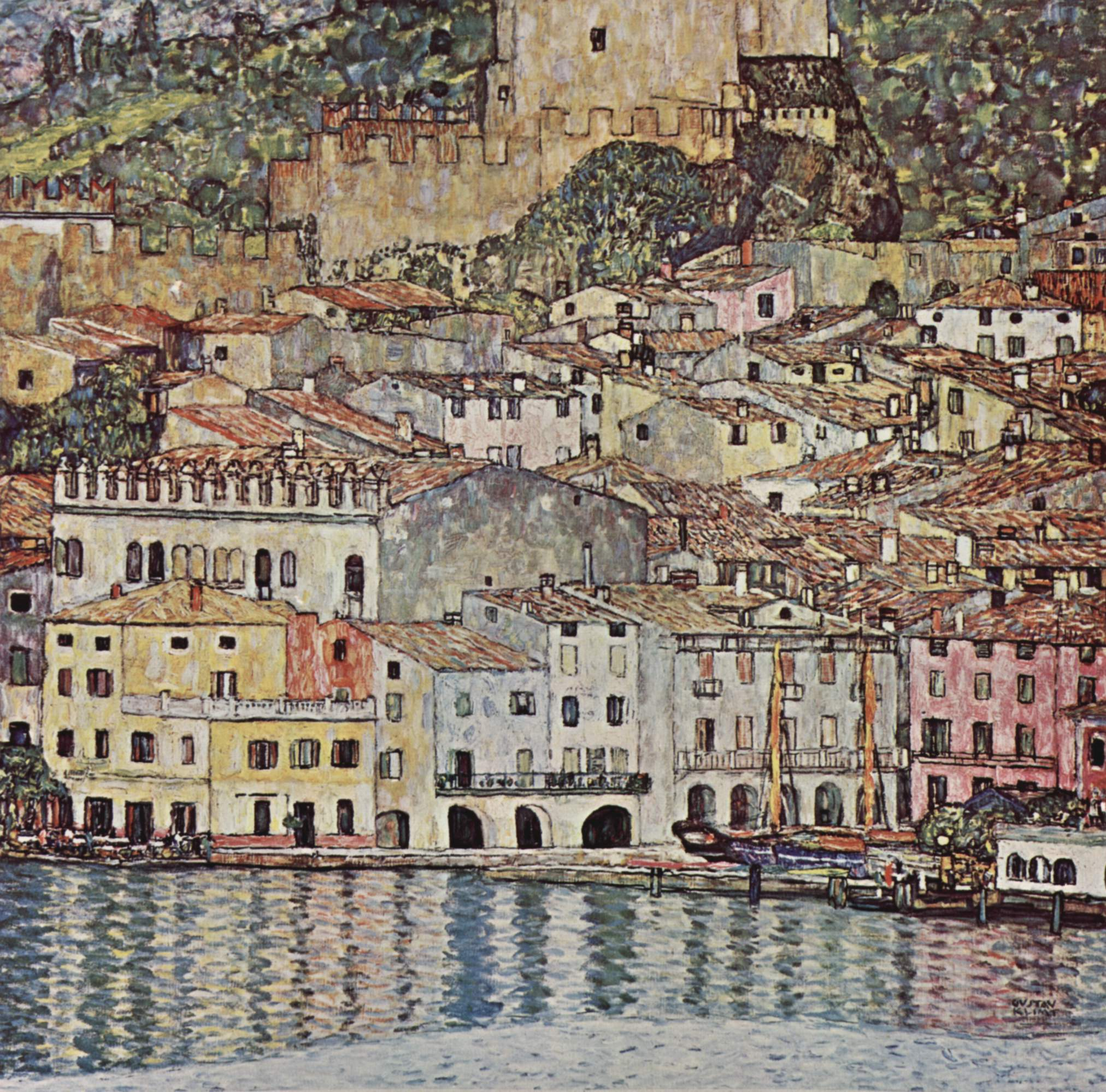
Painting of Malcesine harbour by Gustav Klimt, 1913. Destroyed by fire at Schloss Immendorf, 1945.

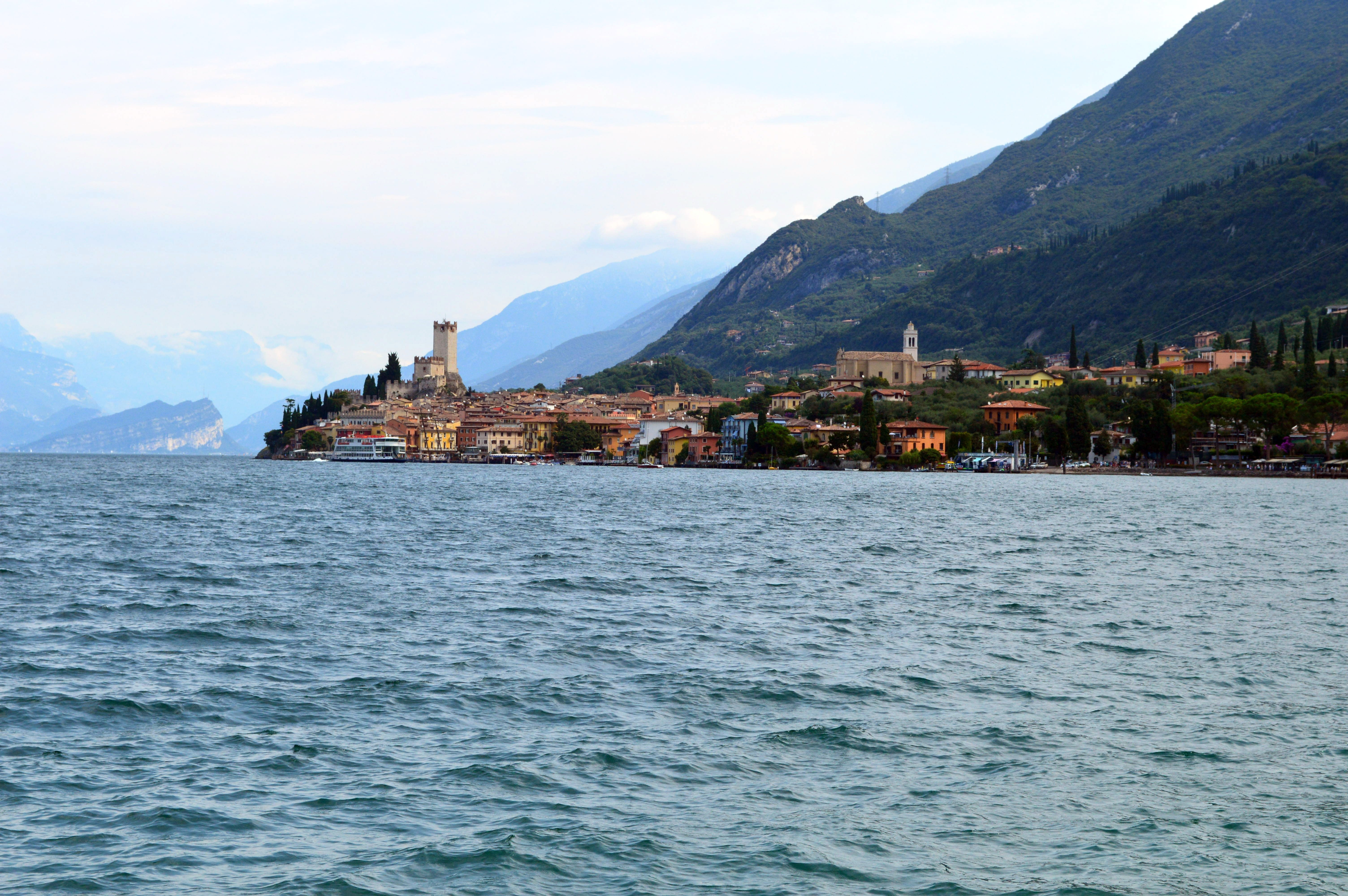
Malcesine from the south.

=== Churches ===
Pieve di S. Stefano (or parish church of St. Stephen), first mentioned in the 9th century. Today's baroque church dates to the early 18th century and contains several works of art including the altars of SS. Benigno e Caro (Saints Benigno and Caro, 1769) and of the Beata Vergine delle sette allegrezze (Virgin of the Seven Joys, 1771), as well as a tabernacle and the painting Deposizione attributed to Girolamo dai Libri.

Santa Maria di Navene is yet another notable church in the town, dating back to the 17th century).

== Economy ==
=== Transport ===
Whilst Malcesine is not connected to the railway, the town is served by buses. Moreover, there is public transportation by boat, including express hydrofoils, on the lake for passengers as well as a car ferry.

== Climate ==
Climate data for Malcesine
Month	Jan	Feb	Mar	Apr	May	Jun	Jul	Aug	Sep	Oct	Nov	Dec	Year
Mean maximum °C (°F)	14.4 (57.9)	15.2 (59.4)	20.4 (68.7)	23.0 (73.4)	27.0 (80.6)	29.8 (85.6)	32.0 (89.6)	31.8 (89.2)	28.6 (83.5)	25.4 (77.7)	18.6 (65.5)	15.4 (59.7)	32.0 (89.6)
Mean daily maximum °C (°F)	9.4 (48.9)	10.8 (51.4)	13.4 (56.1)	16.7 (62.1)	21.3 (70.3)	24.8 (76.6)	28.0 (82.4)	27.5 (81.5)	24.0 (75.2)	19.4 (66.9)	13.5 (56.3)	10.0 (50.0)	18.2 (64.8)
Daily mean °C (°F)	6.7 (44.1)	7.7 (45.9)	10.0 (50.0)	13.0 (55.4)	17.3 (63.1)	20.6 (69.1)	23.7 (74.7)	23.5 (74.3)	20.4 (68.7)	15.8 (60.4)	10.8 (51.4)	7.1 (44.8)	14.7 (58.5)
Mean daily minimum °C (°F)	3.9 (39.0)	4.6 (40.3)	6.6 (43.9)	9.3 (48.7)	13.3 (55.9)	16.4 (61.5)	19.4 (66.9)	19.4 (66.9)	16.8 (62.2)	12.2 (54.0)	8.0 (46.4)	4.1 (39.4)	11.2 (52.2)
Mean minimum °C (°F)	−1.0 (30.2)	0.0 (32.0)	2.2 (36.0)	5.4 (41.7)	9.4 (48.9)	11.0 (51.8)	15.0 (59.0)	14.8 (58.6)	11.4 (52.5)	7.0 (44.6)	2.4 (36.3)	−0.4 (31.3)	−1.0 (30.2)
Average precipitation mm (inches)	43 (1.7)	44 (1.7)	45 (1.8)	48 (1.9)	62 (2.4)	84 (3.3)	56 (2.2)	82 (3.2)	39 (1.5)	34 (1.3)	86 (3.4)	30 (1.2)	653 (25.7)
Average precipitation days (≥ 1.0 mm)	4	5	5	7	8	9	6	7	6	3	6	3	69
Mean monthly sunshine hours	68.2	93.2	120.9	150.0	186.0	204.0	248.0	207.7	162.0	142.6	78.0	86.8	1,747.4
Mean daily sunshine hours	2.2	3.3	3.9	5.0	6.0	6.8	8.0	6.7	5.4	4.6	2.6	2.8	4.8
Source: Archivio climatico Enea-Casaccia
