= Andrew Landenberger =

Australian sailor

Andrew Landenberger (born 15 September 1966) is an Australian sailor and Olympic medalist. He won a silver medal in the Tornado class at the 1996 Summer Olympics in Atlanta, Georgia together with Mitch Booth.

== Life and career ==
Born in Grafton, New South Wales, Landenberger started building sails in Australia under his own label, Landenberger One Design, in 1987.

By 1989, he claimed his first clean sweep winning the State, National and World Championships in the International Moth Class.

By 1996, Landenberger had won an Olympic silver medal in the Tornado class together with Mitch Booth. Since then the full energy has been devoted to sail making.

In 2001, Landenberger made the decision to move with his family to Germany. Landenberger One Design has developed into a business of eight staff specializing mostly in One Design Classes. The production is headed up by Felix Egner who has been with the company since 2004. Despite little time for sailing Landenberger and Egner have sailed two regattas together in the past two years "just for fun" but managed to finish 1st in the 2005 Topcat K1 World Championships and 3rd in the 2006 F18 World Championships.

In 2007, Landenberger build a second home in Australia on the banks of the Clarence River. He owns an extensive design loft where he can develop sails and escape the European winter.

Landenberger is a descendant of the noted nineteenth-century sculler Michael Rush.
