= Sport in South America =

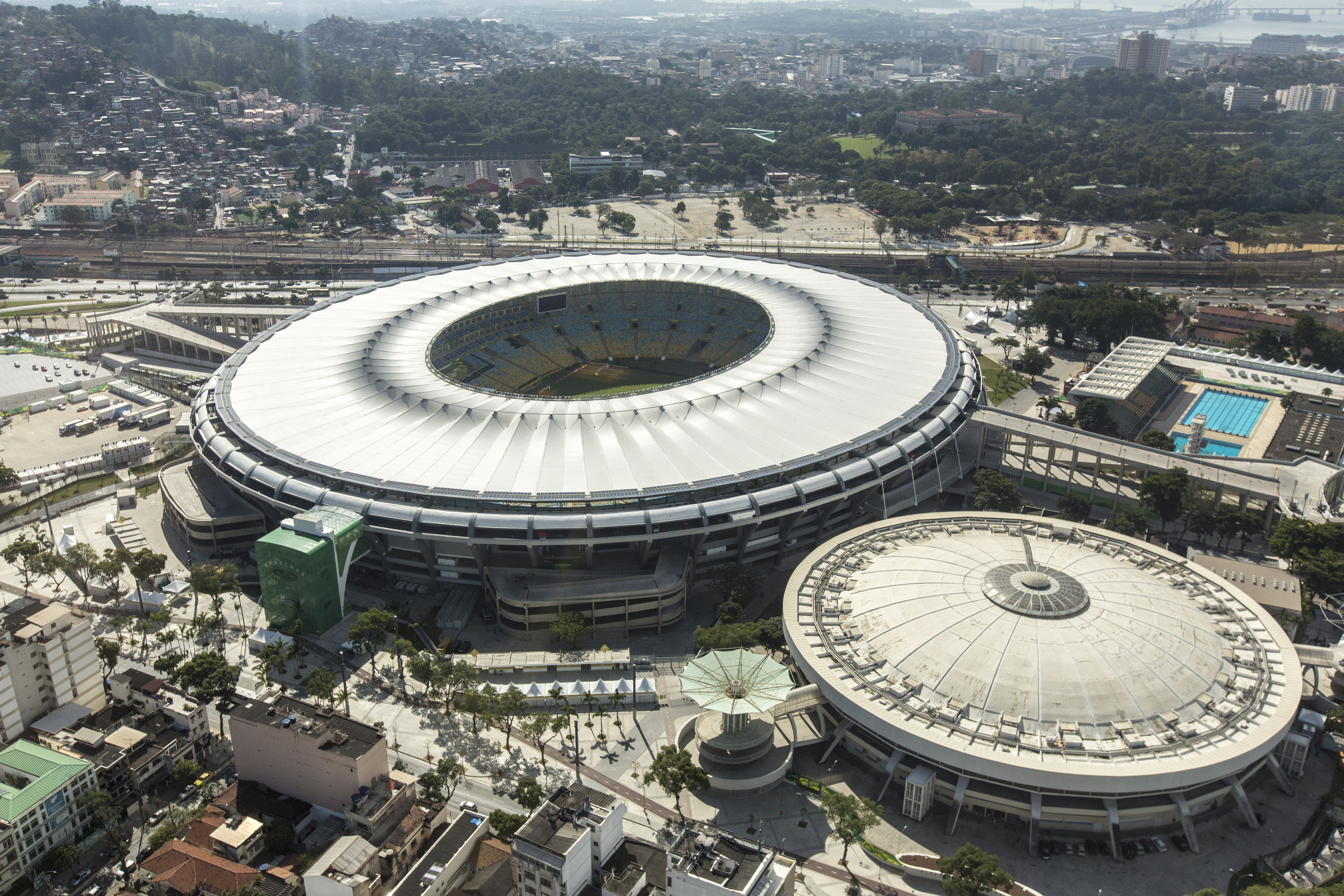
Maracanã Stadium in Rio de Janeiro, Brazil

Association football is the most popular sport in almost all South American countries. There are a wide range of sports played in the continent of South America. Popular sports include volleyball, tennis, basketball, motorsports, combat sports, surfing, skateboarding, baseball, futsal, beach volleyball and table tennis. South America held its first Olympic Games in Rio de Janeiro, Brazil in 2016. Two years prior to this, major cities in Brazil hosted the 2014 FIFA World Cup.

== Team sports ==
=== Association football ===
South America and Europe share the supremacy over the sport, as all national team winners in FIFA World Cup history and all winning teams at the FIFA Club World Cup have come from these two continents. Brazil holds the world record at the FIFA World Cup with five titles in total. Argentina has three titles and Uruguay have two. So far four South American nations have hosted the tournament including its first edition in Uruguay (1930). The other three were Brazil (1950, 2014), Chile (1962), and Argentina (1978).

South America is home to the longest running international football tournament; Copa América, which has been regularly contested since 1916. Argentina have won the Copa América a record 16 times, followed by Uruguay with 15 titles and Brazil with 9.

About the FIFA Confederations Cup, Brazil is the biggest winner of all time with 4 titles. At the Olympic Games, Brazil has 2 titles, Argentina 2, and Uruguay 2. In the FIFA U-20 World Cup, Argentina has 6 titles, Brazil 5 and Uruguay 1. In the FIFA U-17 World Cup, Brazil has 4 titles.

The continent has produced many football players, including Pelé, Garrincha, Ronaldo, Roberto Carlos, Romário, Ronaldinho, Zico, Nílton Santos, Djalma Santos, Taffarel, Falcão, Rivaldo and Neymar (Brazil); Maradona, Messi, Di Stéfano, Batistuta, Passarella, Mario Kempes (Argentina); Luis Suárez, Enzo Francescoli, Cavani, Forlán, Obdulio Varela (Uruguay); Elías Figueroa, Iván Zamorano, Marcelo Salas, Alexis Sánchez (Chile); Carlos Valderrama, Radamel Falcao, James Rodríguez (Colombia); Carlos Gamarra, Romerito, Arsenio Erico (Paraguay); Álex Aguinaga, Alberto Spencer (Ecuador); Teófilo Cubillas, César Cueto, Claudio Pizarro (Peru).

At club level, teams like São Paulo, Palmeiras, Santos, Fluminense, Vasco, Botafogo, Internacional, Grêmio, Atlético Mineiro, Cruzeiro and Atlético Paranaense (Brazil); Boca Juniors, River Plate, Independiente, Estudiantes, Vélez Sarsfield, Racing and San Lorenzo (Argentina); Peñarol and Nacional (Uruguay); Atlético Nacional (Colombia); L.D.U. Quito and Independiente del Valle (Ecuador); Olimpia and Cerro Porteño (Paraguay) are among the main football clubs in the world.

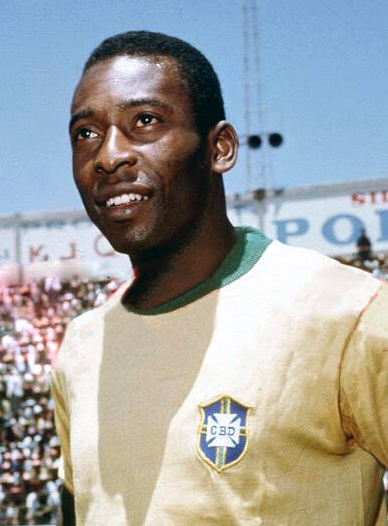
Pelé

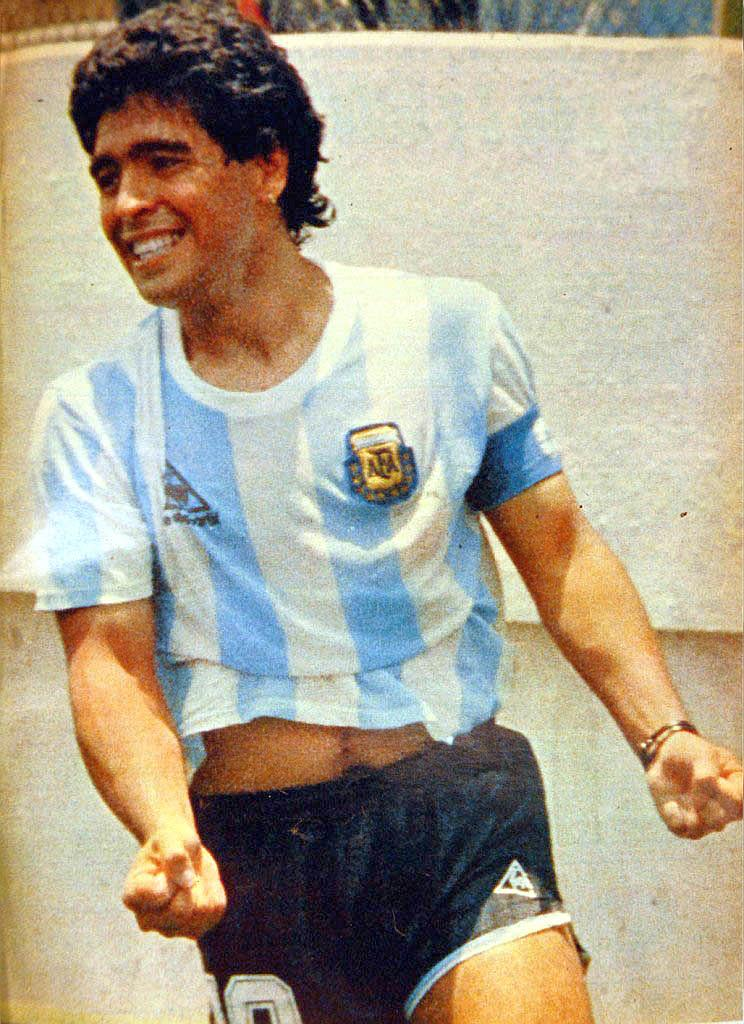
Maradona

==== Variations: futsal, beach soccer, footvolley ====
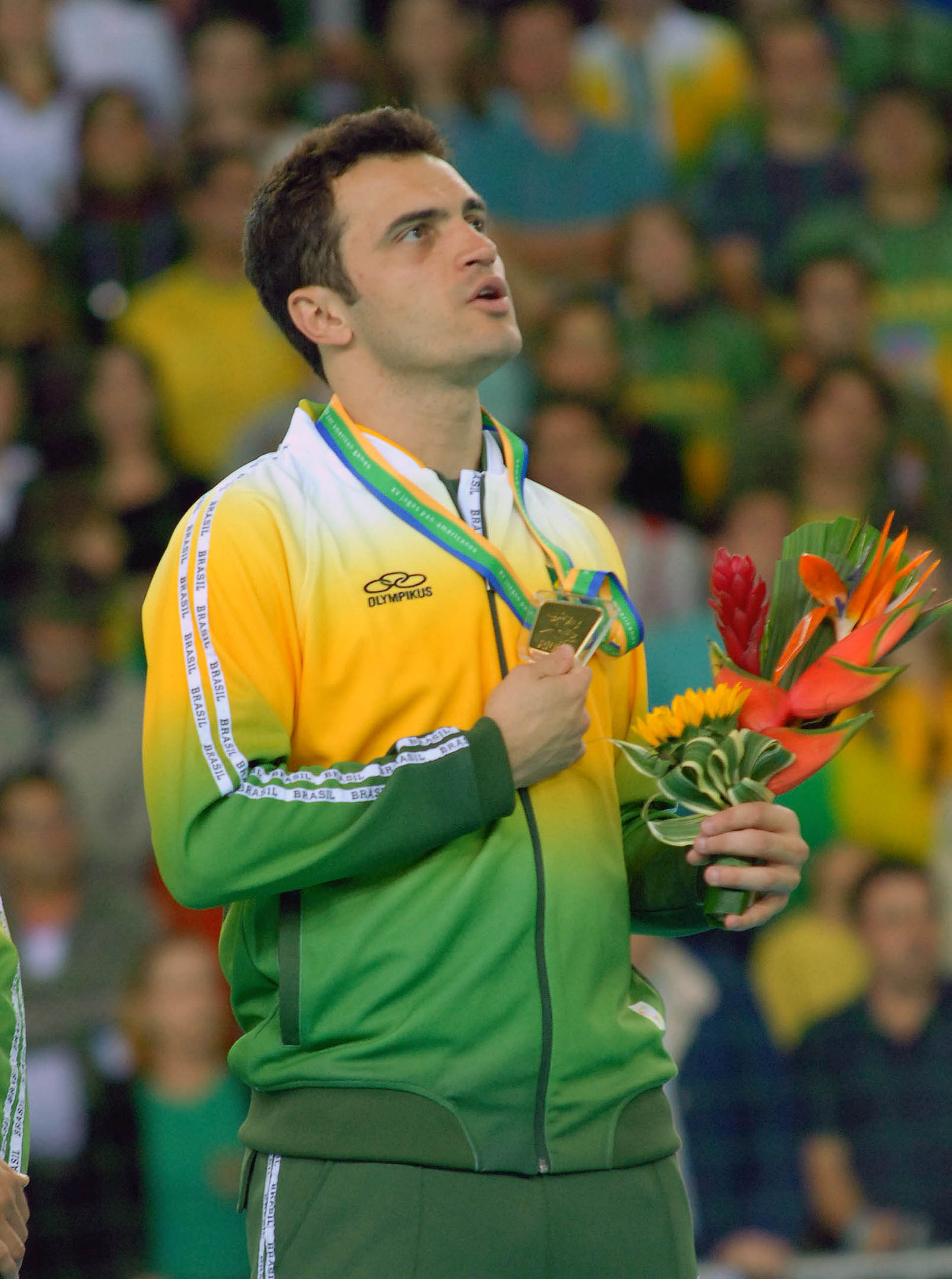
Falcão

Brazil invented some variations of football, such as beach soccer and footvolley. Futsal, having been invented in Uruguay, neighboring Brazil, is also widely practiced in the country, mainly in the state of Rio Grande do Sul, neighboring Uruguay.

In futsal, Brazil, Argentina, Colombia and Paraguay are among the greatest world powers. Before the Fifa tournament, since 1982 there is the Futsal World Championship, organized by the former International Federation of Indoor Soccer (Fifusa) and now by the current AMF, where Paraguay are the current AMF world champions with four, Colombia three, Brazil & Argentina twice, and Venezuela once. In the FIFA tournaments, Brazil is the biggest champion of the FIFA Futsal World Cup, with 5 titles, with Argentina having a title in 2016. Falcão is the most renowned male Brazilian player.

In beach soccer, Brazil and Uruguay are among the world's greatest powers, with Brazil being the biggest champion of the FIFA Beach Soccer World Cup, with 5 titles. In addition, it has nine world titles from the former competition organized by Beach Soccer Worldwide (BSWW), the Beach Soccer World Championships.

Footvolley is a recreational sport widely practiced on Brazilian beaches, mainly in Rio de Janeiro, where it was invented.

=== Baseball ===
Baseball is the most popular sport in Venezuela. In Colombia, baseball is very popular in their north region, and has been gaining popularity recently in the other regions of Colombia. A wide list of players from Venezuela and Colombia are in the major leagues in the United States. Both countries are the only ones in this region to participate in the World Baseball Classic (plus Brazil) and the Caribbean Series.

=== Basketball ===
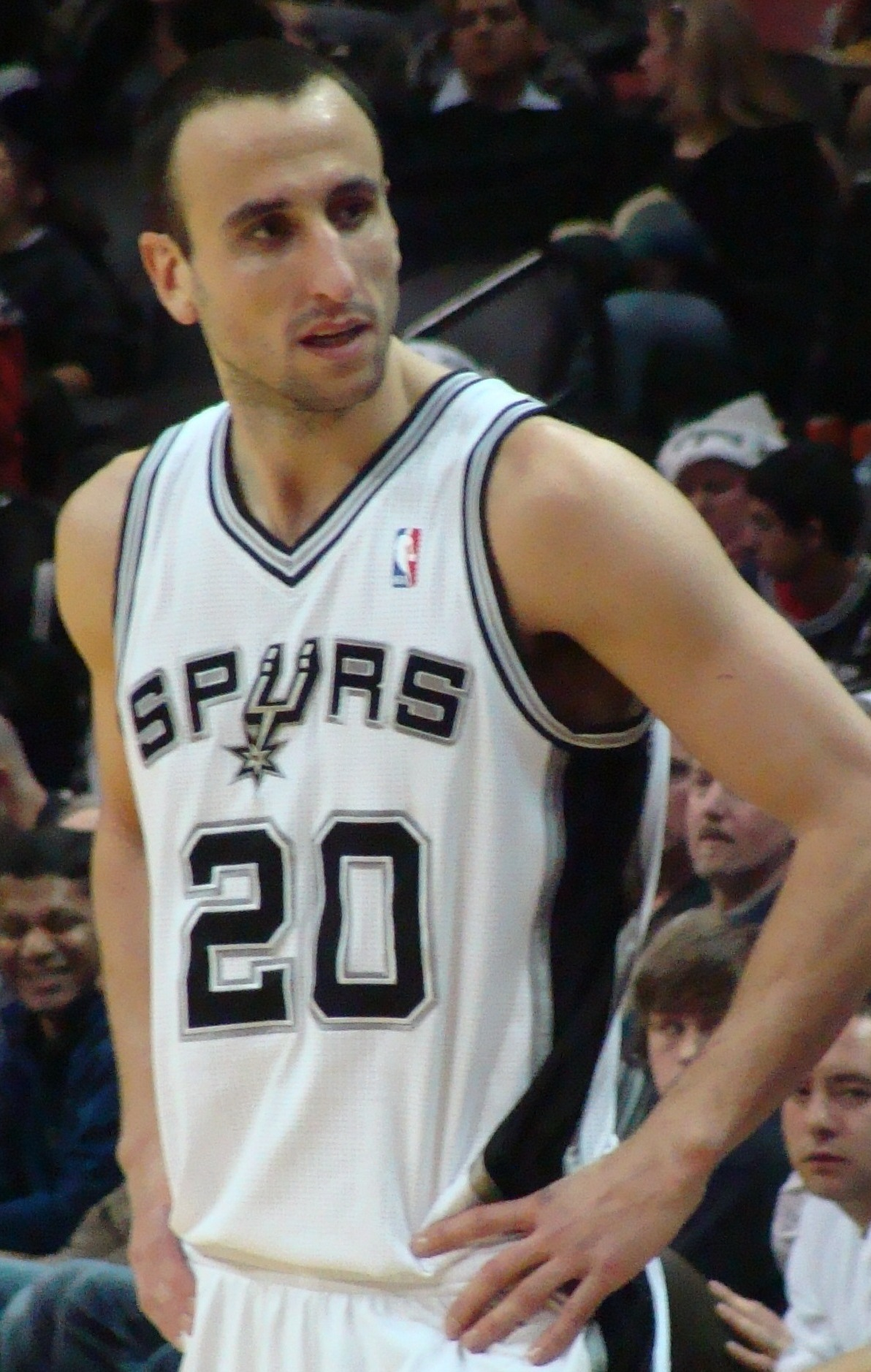
Manu Ginóbili

Basketball is particularly popular in South America. One of the most important achievements was the Argentina gold medal in Men's basketball at the 2004 Summer Olympics. Argentina won the World Championship in 1950. In Brazil, basketball became popular with the Brazil men's national basketball team winning the World Championship two times (1959, 1963) and the Olympic bronze 3 times. Oscar Schmidt is the most renowned male Brazilian player. The Brazil women's national basketball team is also one of the best teams in the world having won the 1994 FIBA World Championship for Women, obtained the Olympic runner-up in 1996 and the Olympic bronze medal in 2000, and with three players in the Hall of Fame: Hortência Marcari, Maria Paula Silva and Janeth Arcain. Also, in Venezuela, Uruguay, Chile, Colombia and Paraguay, basketball is widely played & very popular.

The FIBA World Cup took place in South America seven times: Argentina (1950, 1990), Brazil (1954, 1963), Chile (1959), Uruguay (1967) and Colombia (1982).

=== Cricket ===
Cricket is the most popular sport in Guyana. Apart from there, it is mostly played in the Southern Cone, especially in areas settled by English people. Although a number of South American nations have teams, none of them are major, except for the Guyana national cricket team, which plays in inter-regional competitions in the Caribbean. Guyana is also an independent nation represented by the West Indies cricket team, the only team in the Americas with Test status.

South American Cricket Championship is a limited overs cricket tournament played since 1995 by the national teams of the continent with North American teams also often invited to participate. It is currently played annually but until 2013 was usually played biennially.

Variants of street cricket are also played, such as bete-ombro in Brazil.

=== Field hockey ===
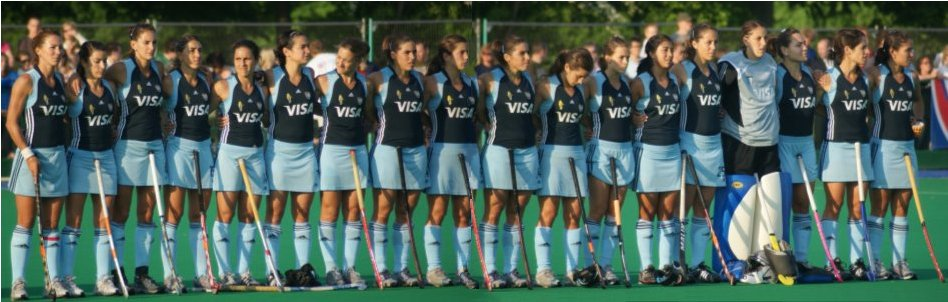
Las Leonas, the women's national team

Very popular in Argentina (2 times World Champion). The women's national team Las Leonas is one of the world's most successful, with five Olympic medals, two World Cups, a World League and seven Champions Trophy. The national team won the World Cup in 2002 and 2010. At the Olympic Games, it won the silver medal in 2000, 2012 and 2020, as well as bronze in 2004 and 2008. Las Leonas also won the annual Champions Trophy on seven occasions, in 2001, 2008, 2009, 2010, 2012, 2014 and 2016 and the World League 2014–2015. Luciana Aymar is recognized as the best female player in the history of the sport, being the only player to have received the FIH Player of the Year Award eight times.

The men's national team Los Leones won the gold medal at the 2016 Summer Olympics and the bronze medal at the 2014 World Cup and 2008 Champions Trophy. The national squad also won Pan American Games on ten occasions and the 2005, 2007 and 2012 Champions Challenges.

==== Rink hockey ====
Argentina has won the world cup 5 times.

=== Handball ===
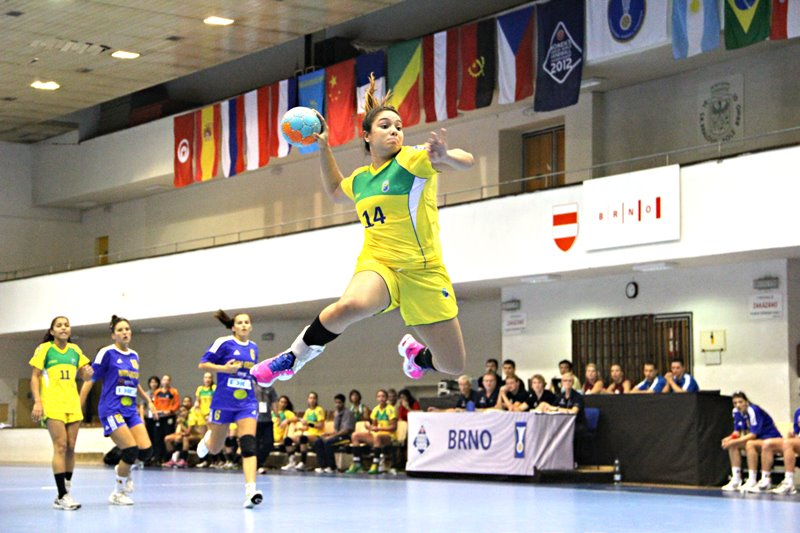
Deborah Pontes

Handball is a sport that came with German immigrants, which is very popular in schools around South America. It's the second most practiced sport in schools in Brazil. The Brazil women's national handball team is, in terms of results, the best handball team in the Americas. At the 2013 World Women's Handball Championship, they were crowned champions, defeating the host team 22-20. They also finished fifth at the 2016 Olympics. The Brazil men's national handball team is considered the best in South America, with the Argentina men's national handball team being its biggest rival. Brazil's team has as its great feat having finished in 7th place in the 2025 World Men's Handball Championship, defeating European powerhouses of the sport and being eliminated only by the eventual champion of the tournament, in addition to also having finished in 7th place in the 2016 Summer Olympics.

=== Polo ===
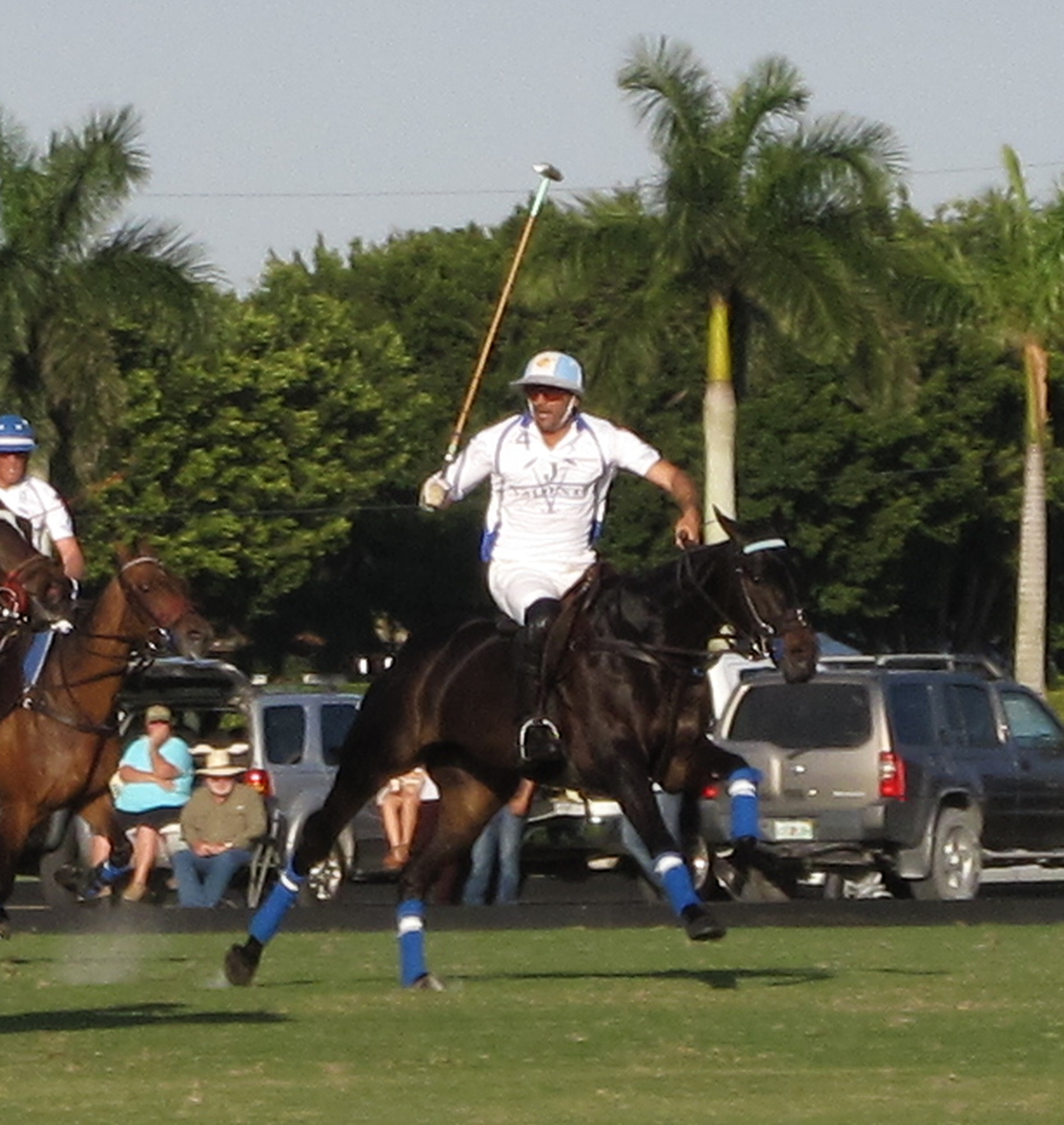
Adolfo Cambiaso

Polo is popular in some parts of Argentina, Brazil, Chile, and Uruguay. South America is the biggest winner of the World Polo Championship, with Argentina having 5 titles, Brazil 3 and Chile 2. Adolfo Cambiaso is an Argentine polo player considered one of the greatest references in the history of this sport.

=== Rugby union ===
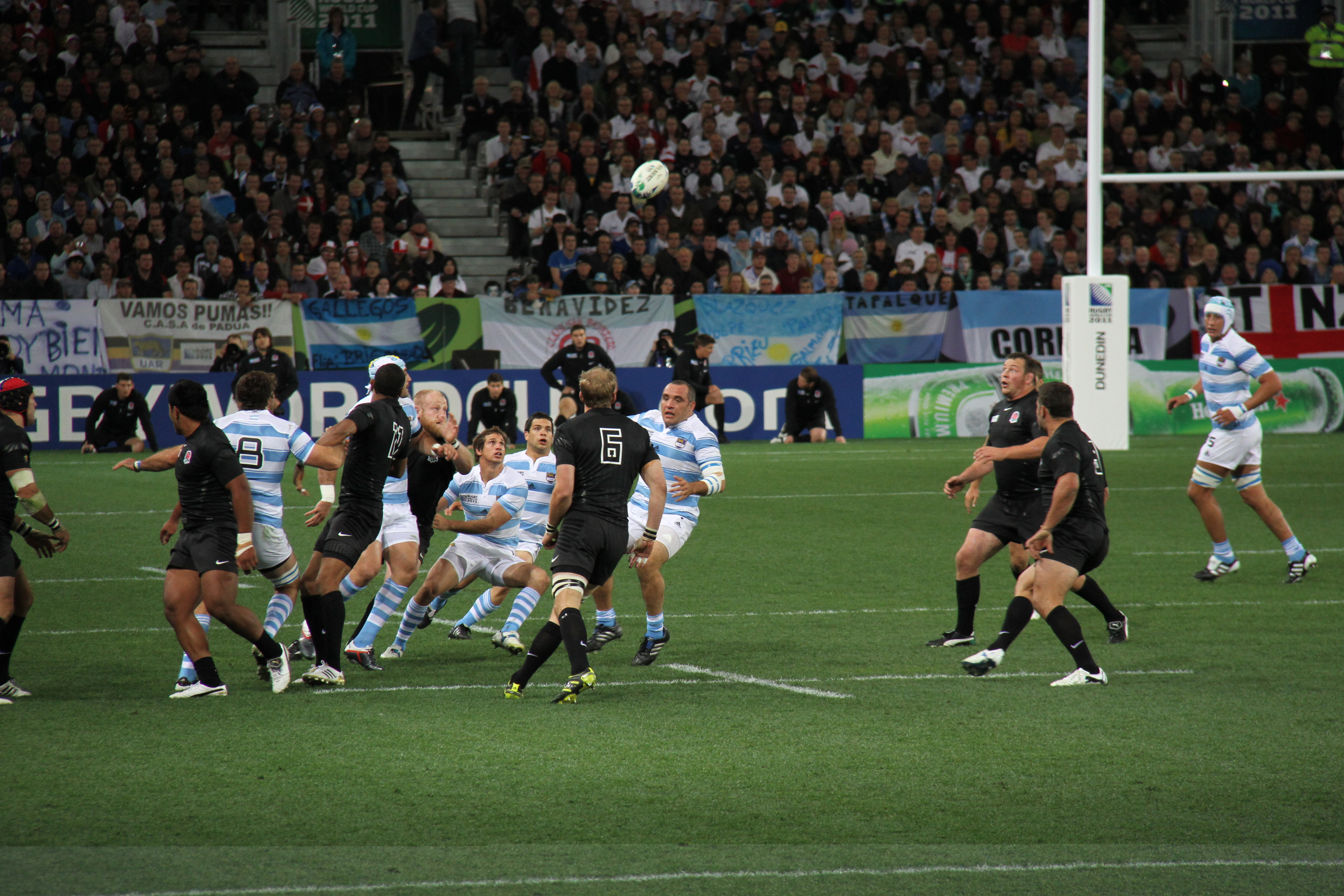
Argentina facing England at the 2011 Rugby World Cup

Rugby union is becoming popular in South America, following the recent successes of Argentina in recent Rugby World Cup competitions (3rd place in 2007 and 4th place in 2015). The popularity of the game has spread across the continent. Uruguay, Paraguay, Colombia, Brazil, Chile, Venezuela, Guyana, Peru and Bolivia all have Rugby Federations.

=== Volleyball ===
Volleyball is the second most popular sport in Brazil. The Brazilian men's team has 6 Olympic medals (3 gold, 3 silver), 7 World Championship medals (3 gold, 3 silver, 1 bronze) and has won nine World Leagues, while Brazil's women's team has won two gold, one silver and three bronze medals at the Olympic Games, in addition to four runners-up and a third place at World Championships. In the 1980s, Peru women's national volleyball team was one of the strongest in the world, winning an Olympic silver medal in 1988, as well as a silver medal in 1982 and a bronze in 1986 at the World Championships. Argentina men's national volleyball team has won 2 Olympic bronzes in 1988 and 2020, and a bronze at the 1982 World Championship.

Brazilian volleyball teams

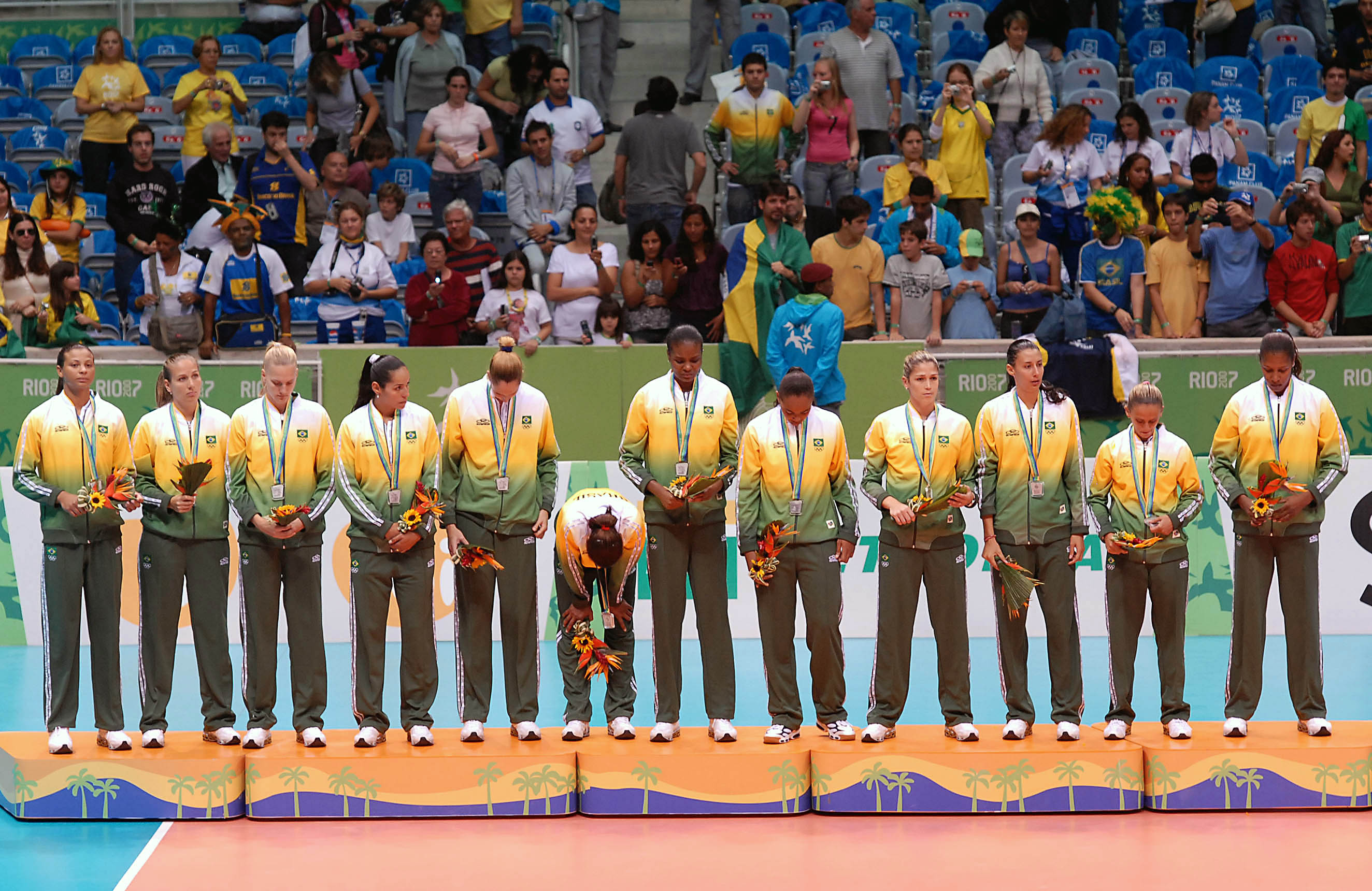
Brazil women's national volleyball team, 2007

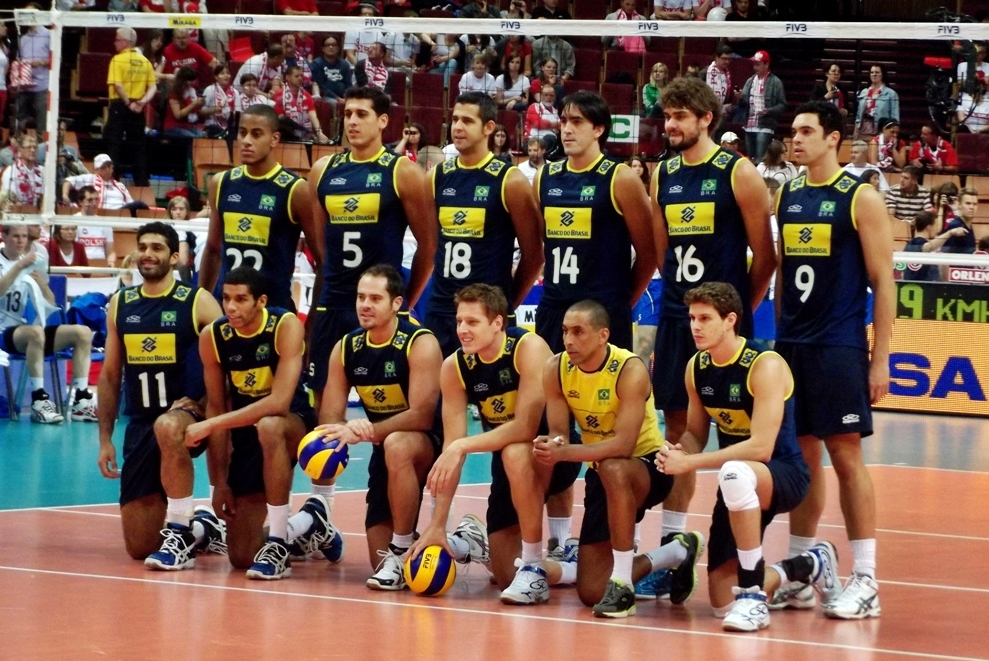
Brazil men's national volleyball team, 2012

==== Beach volleyball ====
Brazil is one of the strongest countries in the world in beach volleyball, a sport widely practiced in the country due to its long coastline, mainly in Rio de Janeiro and in the Northeast Region of the country. Until the 2024 Summer Olympic Games, the country had 3 golds, 3 silvers and 2 bronze in the men's event, and 1 gold, 4 silvers and 2 bronzes in the women's events. Argentina, Chile and Venezuela usually send representatives to the Olympic Games, but without any significant results so far. In World Championships, in addition to several titles obtained by Brazilians, the Argentines Mariano Baracetti and Martín Conde were world champions in 2001.

== Individual sports ==
=== Archery ===
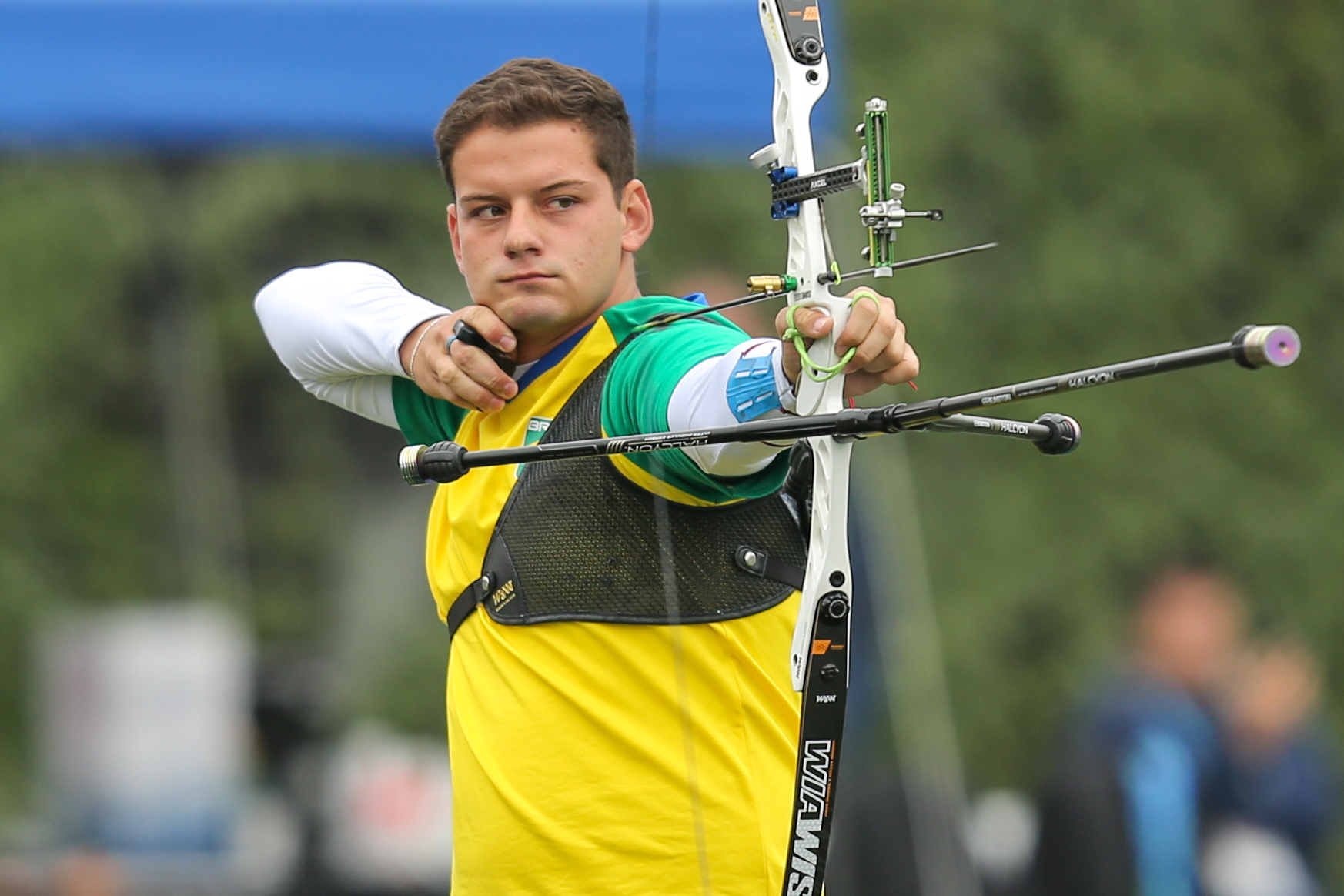
Marcus Vinicius D'Almeida

Marcus Vinicius D'Almeida, in the recurve bow category, is the greatest male archery athlete in the history of South America, having been number 1 in the world in 2023, and world runner-up in 2021. The Chilean Denisse van Lamoen won a world title in the recurve bow in 2011, and the Colombian Natalia Sánchez was a world bronze medalist in 2009. In the Compound bow (which does not participate in the Olympic Games), The Colombian Sara López, multiple world champion, stands out.

=== Athletics ===
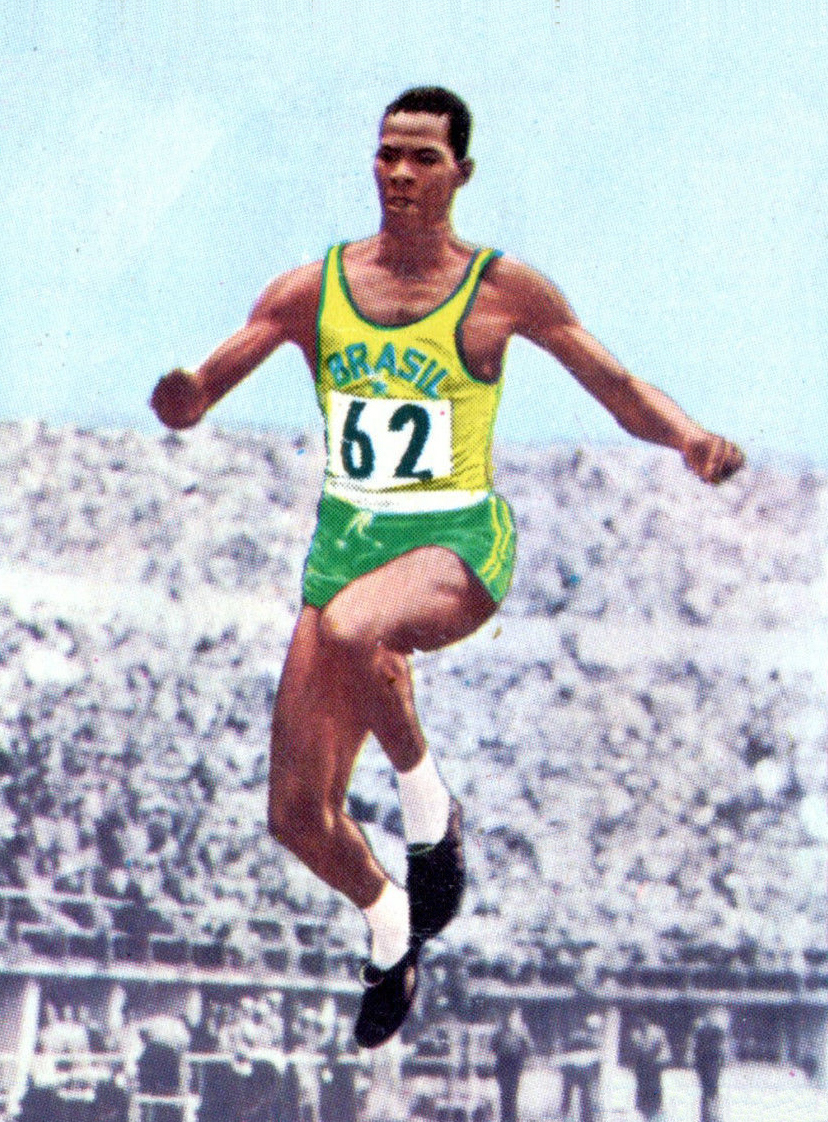
Adhemar Ferreira da Silva

South American athletes have achieved international success in track and field. Notable athletes include:

Brazil: Adhemar Ferreira da Silva, Joaquim Cruz, Maurren Maggi, Thiago Braz, Vanderlei Cordeiro de Lima, João Carlos de Oliveira, Robson Caetano, Fabiana Murer, Alison dos Santos, Nélson Prudêncio, Jadel Gregório, Zequinha Barbosa, Sanderlei Parrela, Claudinei Quirino, Vicente de Lima, André Domingos, Édson Ribeiro, Caio Bonfim, Rosângela Santos, Letícia Oro Melo, Mauro Vinícius da Silva and Darlan Romani.

Colombia: Caterine Ibargüen, Ximena Restrepo, Anthony Zambrano and Sandra Arenas.

Venezuela: Yulimar Rojas.

Ecuador: Jefferson Pérez.

Argentina: Delfo Cabrera, Juan Carlos Zabala, Noemí Simonetto de Portela and Reinaldo Gorno.

The triple jump is among the disciplines in which South American athletes have excelled. The continent hosts the Saint Silvester Road Race, an annual event in São Paulo.

=== Canoeing ===
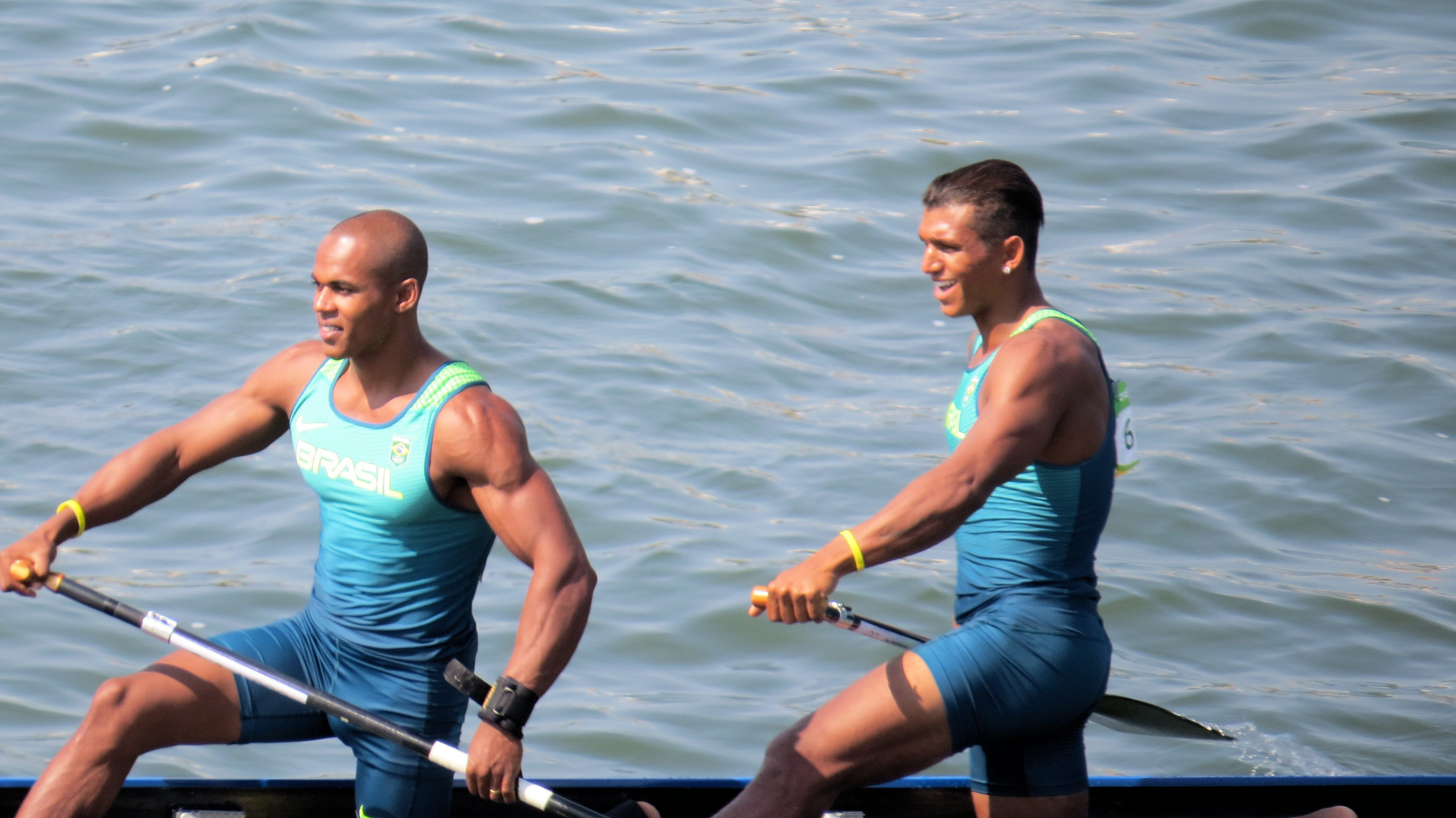
Erlon Silva (front) and Isaquias Queiroz (back)

In sprint canoeing, the Brazilian Isaquias Queiroz is the best canoeist in the history of South America, being the only Olympic champion of this modality on the continent and adding a total of four Olympic medals until the Tokyo 2020 Olympic Games. Erlon Silva also won Olympic silver for Brazil in canoeing.

In slalom canoeing, the best Brazilians in history to date are Ana Sátila and Pepe Gonçalves, who reached the Olympic finals and won medals in World Championships.

=== Chess ===
Chess is a sport with many fans in South America. The continent has produced some great players such as Argentine Miguel Najdorf (known for the Najdorf Variation), and Brazilians Henrique Mecking (3rd best in the world in 1977) and Luis Paulo Supi (who defeated world champion Magnus Carlsen).

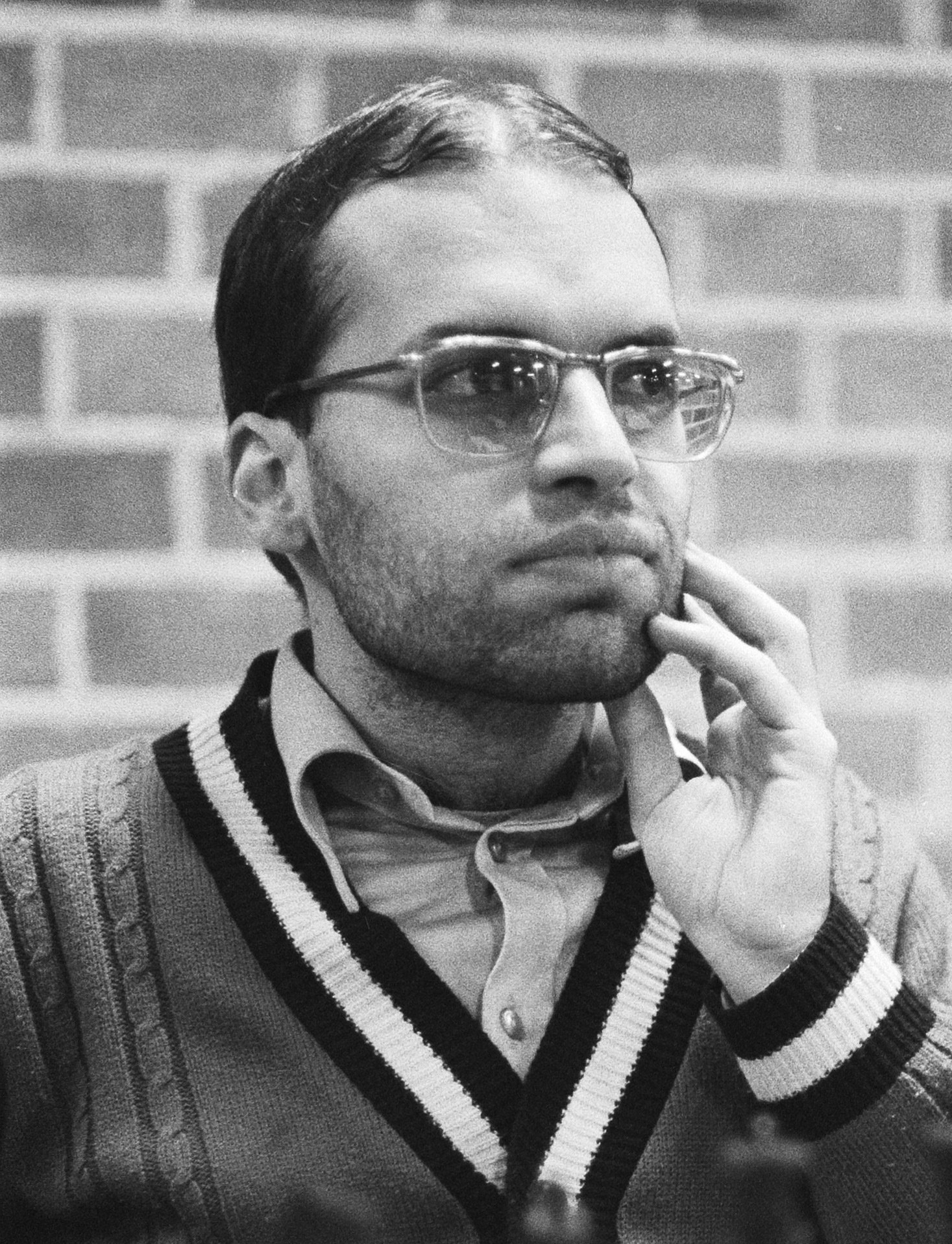
Henrique Mecking

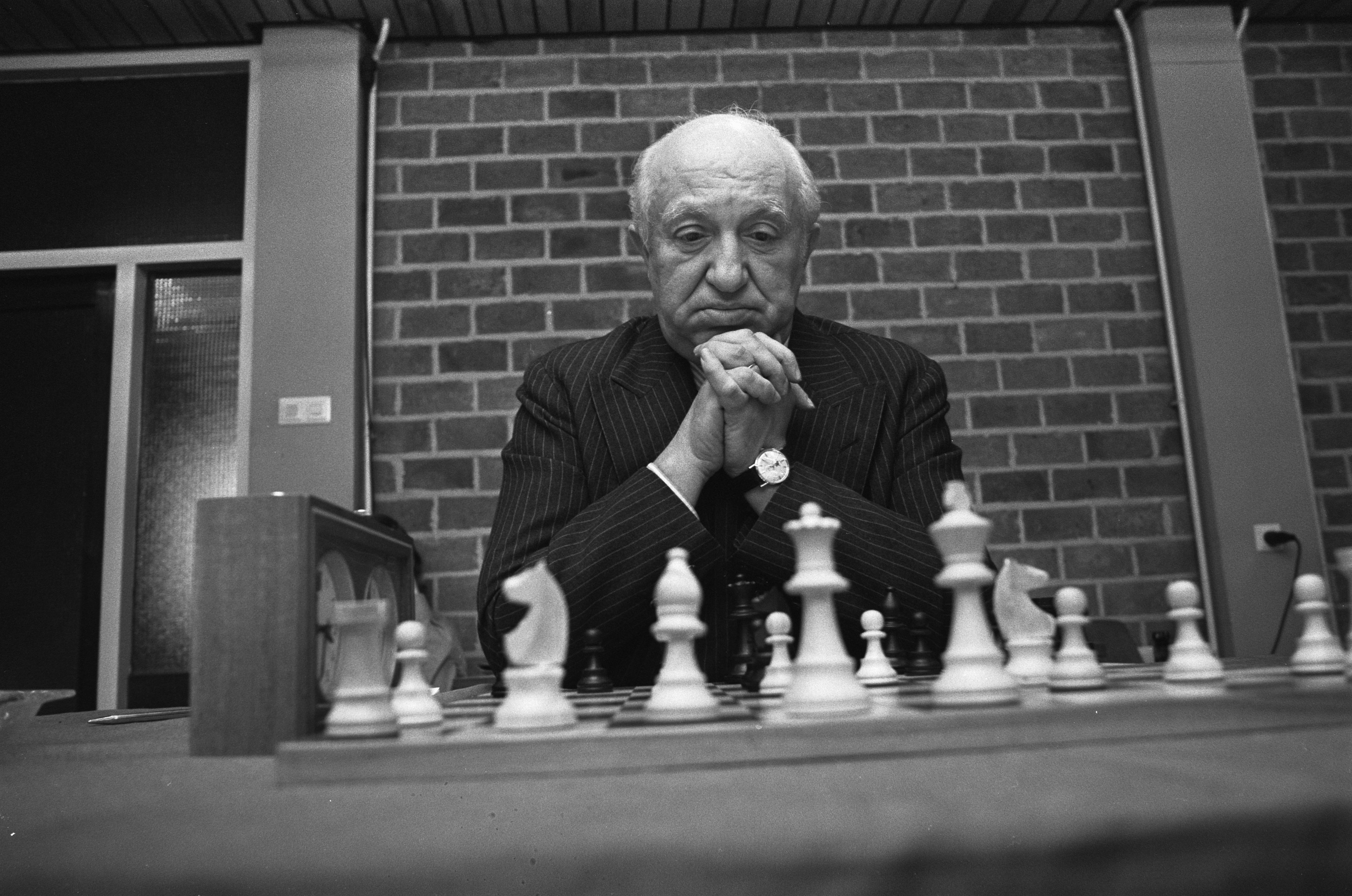
Miguel Najdorf

=== Combat sports ===
==== Boxing ====
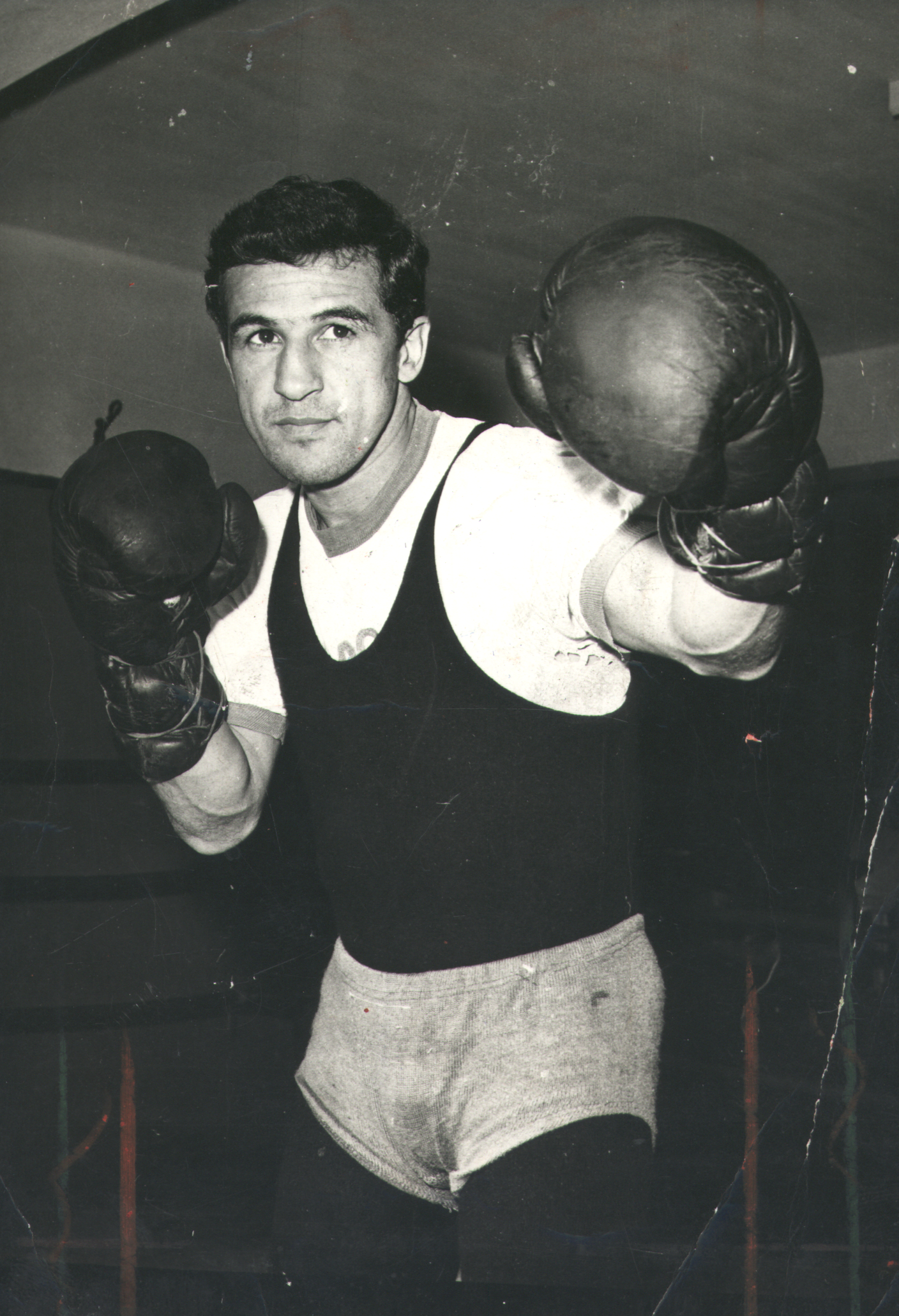
Éder Jofre

Boxing is particularly strong in South America, with several world and Olympic champions born in the continent. In Argentina, the most historically important boxers are:Carlos Monzón, Horacio Accavallo, Santos Laciar, Juan Martín Coggi, Nicolino Locche, Víctor Galíndez, Jorge Castro, Marcela Acuña and. Sergio Martínez. In Brazil, Eder Jofre, Acelino Freitas, Miguel de Oliveira, Valdemir Pereira, Rose Volante and Patrick Teixeira are former world champions, while Adilson Rodrigues was an important Heavyweight of the 1980s and 1990s; Robson Conceição and Hebert Conceição were Olympic champions, and other Olympic medalists were Servílio de Oliveira, Yamaguchi Falcão, Esquiva Falcão, Abner Teixeira, Adriana Araújo and Beatriz Ferreira.

Venezuela and Colombia have also had strong eras in boxing. Venezuela particularly in the 1970s and 1980s with champions like Betulio Gonzalez and Rafael Orono, and Colombia with boxers such as Rodrigo Valdez, Antonio Cervantes and Miguel Lora.

==== Brazilian jiu-jitsu, vale tudo, and mixed martial arts ====
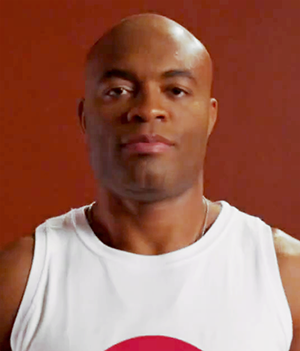
Anderson Silva

Mixed martial arts is one of the most popular sports in Brazil.

Brazilian jiu-jitsu originated in Brazil in the 1910s, and emphasizes ground fighting techniques and submission holds involving joint-locks and chokeholds. Hélio Gracie had a rather small build and changed jiu-jitsu (originating from Japan) to be used by anyone in a real fight situation. The belt progression system goes in the following order: White, Blue, Purple, Brown, Black, Red-black, and Red. Gracie Jiu Jitsu became known internationally in the 1990s, due to the very skilled fighters in the Gracie family, namely Hélio Gracie, Royce Gracie, and Rickson Gracie, which are also responsible for spreading the practice of vale tudo, meaning "anything goes", which evolved into mixed martial arts tournaments such as PRIDE, DREAM, and the Ultimate Fighting Championship. Many Brazilian fighters have become significant figures in various mixed martial art tournaments abroad, some notable Brazilian fighters in these tournaments include Anderson Silva, José Aldo, Wanderlei Silva, Minotauro, Vitor Belfort, Mauricio Rua, Murilo Bustamante, Junior dos Santos, Rafael dos Anjos, Fabricio Werdum, Lyoto Machida, Alex Pereira and Amanda Nunes. Argentina, Venezuela, Colombia, Chile, Ecuador and Uruguay have already had some fighters in MMA, but to this day none of them have won the title of champion.

==== Fencing ====
Although South America has little tradition in fencing, the continent has produced some renowned athletes. The Venezuelan Rubén Limardo was an Olympic champion in 2012 in Men's épée, in addition to being twice a silver medalist at World Championships. For Brazil, Nathalie Moellhausen was world champion in 2019 for Brazil and in 2009 for Italy, and reached the quarter-finals of the 2016 Olympic Games in Women's épée. Guilherme Toldo reached the quarter-finals of the 2016 Summer Olympics in Men's foil.

==== Judo ====
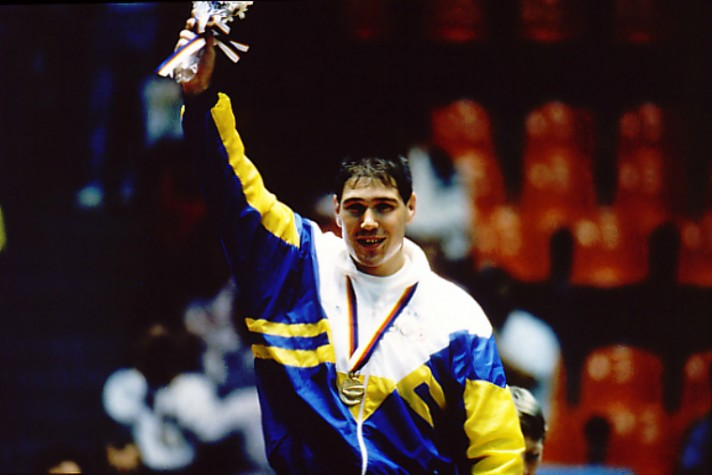
Aurélio Miguel

Brazil is one of the greatest world powers in judo, a sport developed in the country thanks to its large Japanese community. The greatest exponents of the sport until today were Aurélio Miguel, Sarah Menezes and Rogério Sampaio, Olympic champions. Brazil also had several other important judo athletes, such as the Olympic runners-up Douglas Vieira, Tiago Camilo, Carlos Honorato, Willian Lima, and the Olympic bronze medalists Chiaki Ishii, Luiz Onmura, Walter Carmona, Henrique Guimarães, Leandro Guilheiro, Flávio Canto, Ketleyn Quadros, Felipe Kitadai, Mayra Aguiar, Daniel Cargnin, Rafael Silva and Larissa Pimenta. The sport has also been developing lately in Argentina, with judokas like Paula Pareto, and in Colombia, with judokas like Yuri Alvear.

==== Taekwondo ====
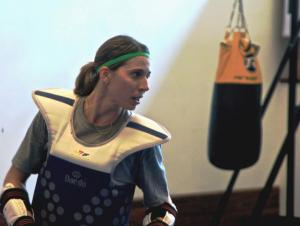
Natalia Falavigna

In taekwondo, in 1992, when it was still an Olympic demonstration sport, the Venezuelan Arlindo Gouveia was champion and Adriana Carmona was a bronze medalist (later she would be a bronze medalist in 2004, officially). Another Venezuelan, Dalia Contreras, was a bronze medalist in 2008. Brazilian Natália Falavigna was a bronze medalist in 2008 and 4th place in 2004. Maicon Siqueira won bronze in 2016. Diogo Silva finished 4th in 2004 and 2012, and Milena Titoneli finished 4th in 2020. Argentina's biggest highlights are Sebastián Crismanich, Olympic champion in 2012, and Gabriel Taraburelli who finished 4th place in 2000. For Colombia, Óscar Muñoz was bronze in 2012, and Gladys Mora finished 4th in 2004. The Peruvian Peter López Santos came in 4th place in 2008.

=== Cycling ===
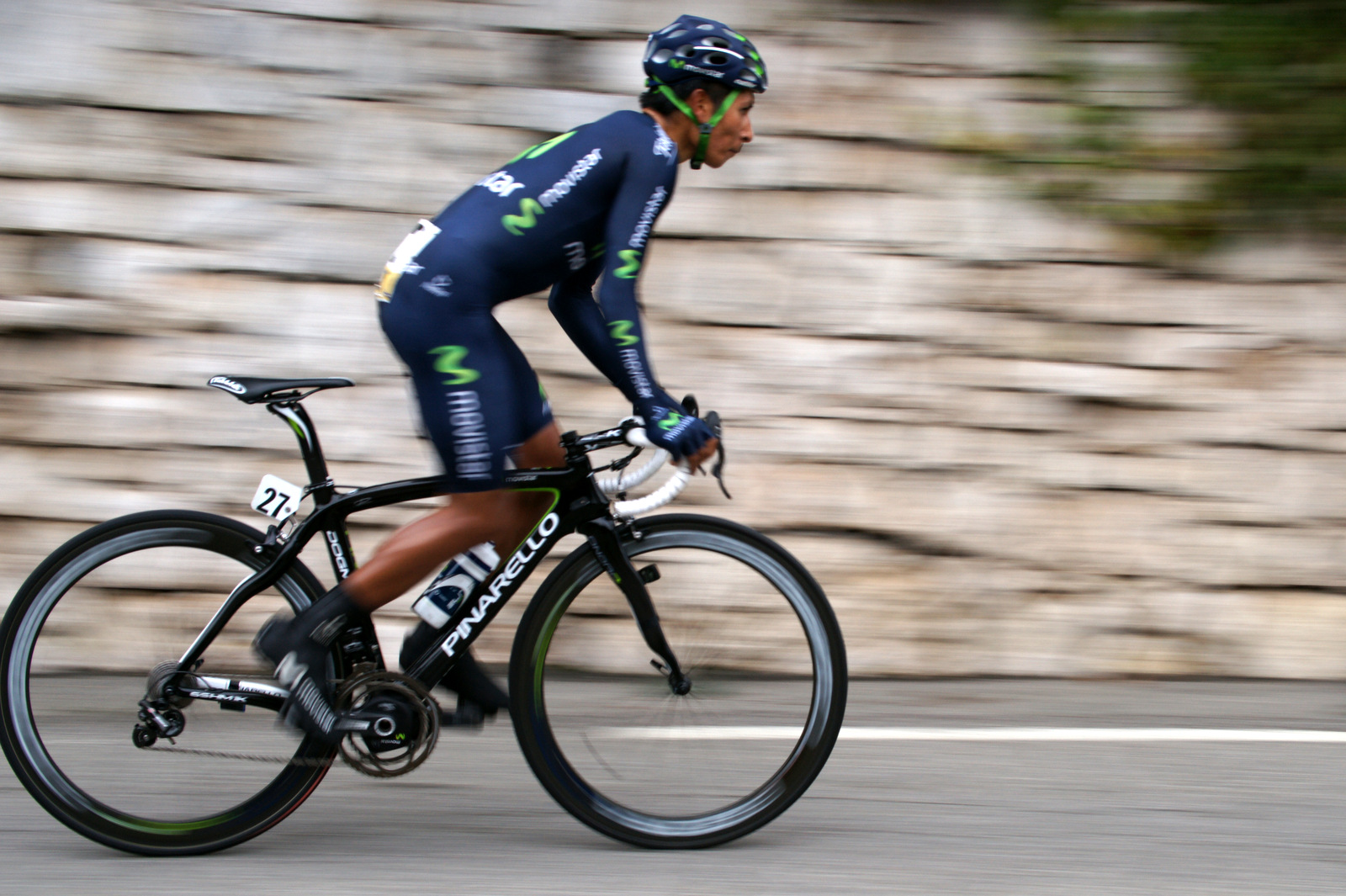
Nairo Quintana: Colombian Champion of the Giro d'Italia and the Vuelta a España

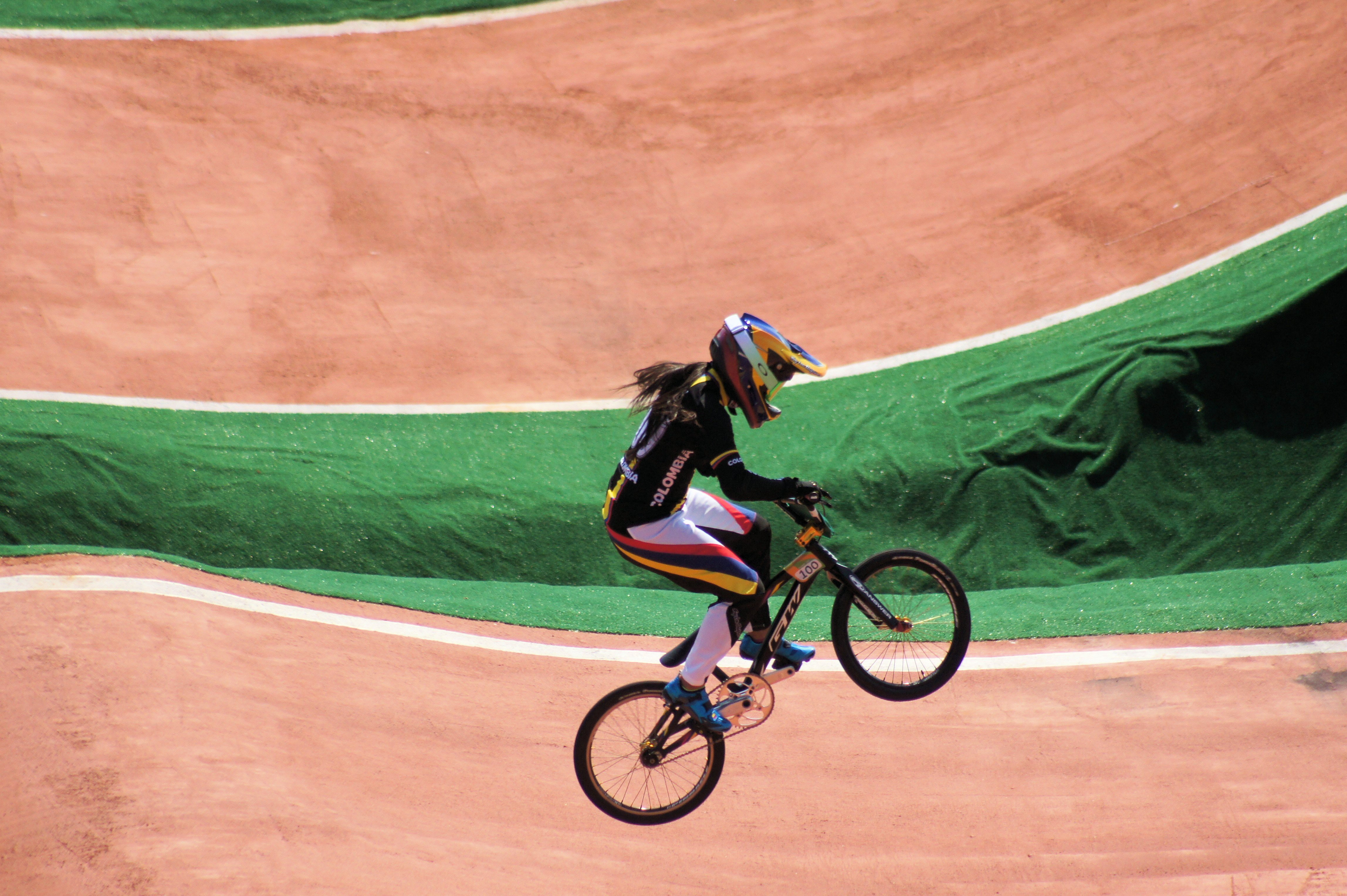
Mariana Pajón is a Colombian cyclist, two-time Olympic gold medalist and BMX World Champion

Cycling in Colombia became very popular with the beginning of the annual Vuelta a Colombia race in 1951, followed by the annual Clásico RCN starting in 1961. The triumphs of Martín Emilio "Cochise" Rodríguez in European cycling competitions increased the sport's popularity, which in turn helped to develop the Colombian Cycling Federation. Rodriguez was followed by professional Colombian cyclists known as the "Colombian beetles", which include up to this date Luis "Lucho" Herrera, Luis Felipe Laverde, Fabio Parra, Víctor Hugo Peña, Santiago Botero, Mauricio Soler. The "escarabajo" (beetle) nickname was coined by radio announcer José Enrique Buitrago, while watching Ramón Hoyos climb a hill ahead of French professional racer José Beyaert during the 1955 Vuelta a Colombia.

Colombian cycling has enjoyed a renaissance in the early 2010s, with Colombian riders enjoying international success. One of the factors cited for this success has been the establishment of the 4-72 Colombia cycling team (formerly known as Colombia es Pasión-Café de Colombia), which has developed several cyclists who have gone on to compete for UCI Worldteams. The government-backed Colombia–Coldeportes cycling team competed at the 2013 Giro d'Italia, and was the first all-Colombian team to do so for 21 years. The team aimed to secure UCI ProTeam status and compete in the Tour de France, however the team announced its disbanding in October 2015 due to the withdrawal of financial support from Coldeportes, the Colombian government's sports ministry. Riders who graduated to the UCI World Tour from the team included Esteban Chaves and Darwin Atapuma. High-profile riders emerging in this period include Nairo Quintana, Rigoberto Urán, Sergio Henao, Carlos Betancur and Mariana Pajón. The two main strongholds of the sport in Colombia are the Altiplano Cundiboyacense in the centre of the country and Antioquia in the west, both being mountainous regions.

Some of the top Colombian cyclists are:

- María Luisa Calle, bronze medal winner in the 2004 Summer Olympics in Athens and World Champion.
- Fabio Parra, 3rd place in the tour de France, 1988
- Santiago Botero, Time trial world champion
- Martín Emilio "Cochise" Rodríguez, Hour world record holder and world champion in 4,000 m pursuit.
- Marlon Pérez, Youth World Champion in the points race, 1994
- Efraín Domínguez, Double world record in kilometer and 200 m pushed 1987
- Luis "Lucho" Herrera, "El jardinerito", Champion of the Dauphiné Libéré (1988, 1991) and Vuelta a España (1987), first non-European to win the Tour de France Mountains classification (1985)
- Martín Ramírez, Champion Dauphiné Libéré 1984
- Alfonso Flórez Ortiz, Champion Tour de l'Avenir 1980
- Víctor Hugo Peña, one of only three Colombian cyclists to have ever worn the yellow jersey in the Tour de France (2003).
- Rigoberto Urán, silver medal winner in the Men's Olympic Road Race, 2012 Summer Olympics, second place in the Giro d'Italia (2013, 2014), second place in the Tour de France (2017).
- Mariana Pajón, gold medal winner at the 2012 Summer Olympics in the women's BMX event, gold medal winner at the 2016 Summer Olympics in the women's BMX event.
- Carlos Oquendo, bronze medal winner at the 2012 Summer Olympics in the men's BMX event.
- Nairo Quintana, 2nd place overall in the Tour de France, 2013, 1st place overall Tour of the Basque Country, 2013, 1st place overall Vuelta a Burgos, 2013, 1st place overall Giro d'Italia 2014, winner of Tirreno–Adriatico 2015, 1st place overall Vuelta a España 2016.
- Edwin Ávila, double track cycling world champion in the points race (2011,2014).
- Esteban Chaves, second place in the Giro d'Italia (2016)
- Carlos Ramírez placed third at the 2016 Summer Olympics in men's BMX
- Iván Sosa, 1st place overall in the 2018 Vuelta a Burgos
- Fernando Gaviria wearer of the Yellow Jersey in the 2018 Tour de France
- Egan Bernal winner of the general and youth classifications in the 2019 Tour de France and 2021 Giro d'Italia

=== Golf ===
Golf is growing in popularity in both Brazil and Argentina but is not widely played elsewhere in South America. Bolivia has the highest tournament class golf course in the world.

=== Gymnastics ===
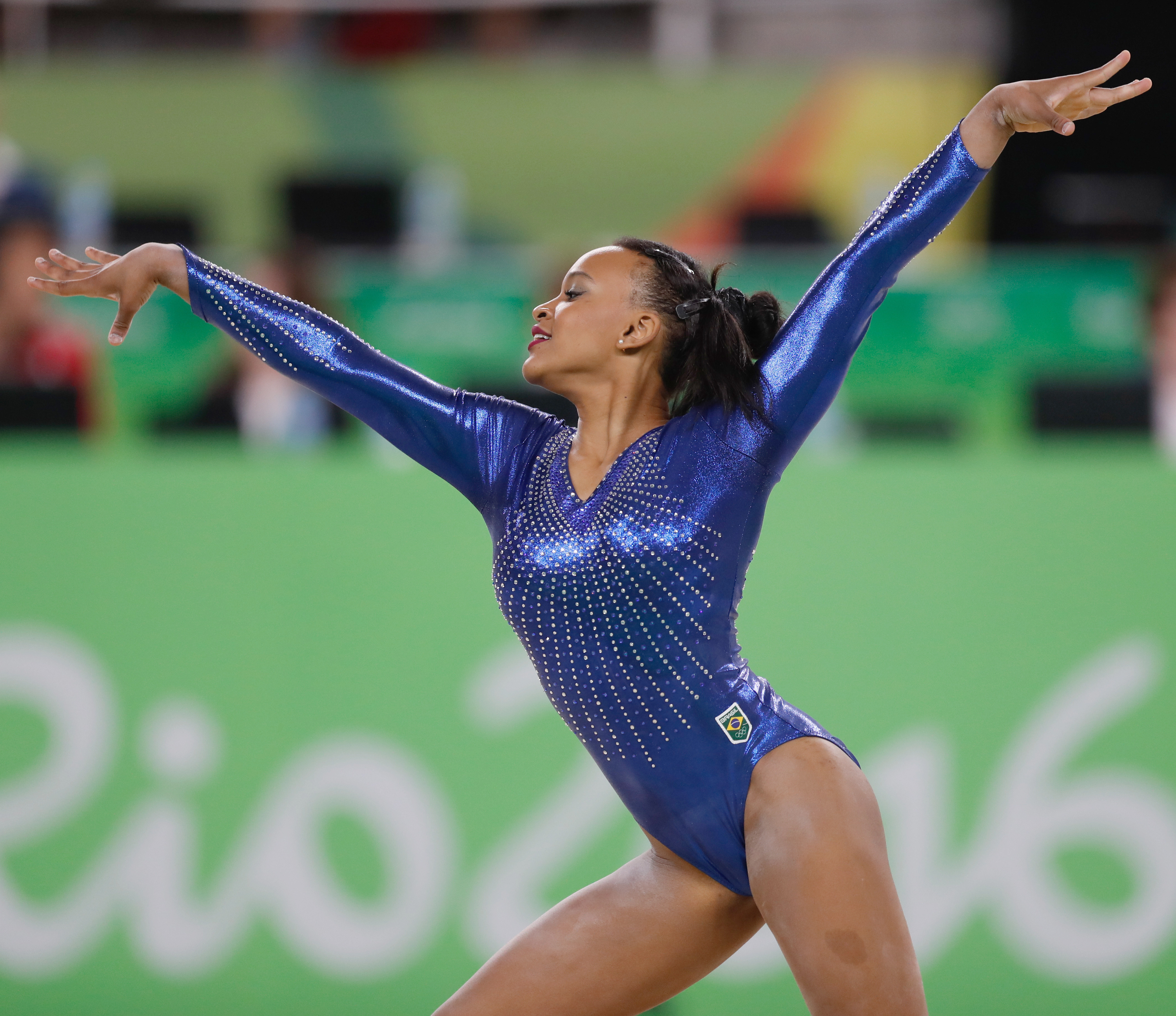
Rebeca Andrade

Brazil has a large training center for Olympic athletes in artistic gymnastics, which has already revealed athletes such as Rebeca Andrade, Arthur Zanetti, Daiane dos Santos, Jade Barbosa, Flávia Saraiva, Arthur Mariano, Diego Hypólito and Daniele Hypólito. In Chile, Tomás González reached 4th place in the floor and vault events at the 2012 London Olympics. In rhythmic gymnastics, the Brazilian team won an unprecedented bronze in the general event of the Athens, Greece stage of the Rhythmic Gymnastics World Cup, held in March 2023.

=== Jai Alai ===
Jai alai or Basque pelota is played in many parts of South America. Although this sport is mostly played in Spain and France, there are federations of Basque ball in Argentina, Bolivia, Brazil, Chile, Ecuador, Paraguay, Peru, Uruguay, and Venezuela. Due to the origin of the game, there are many good players who are Basques, either natives or from the Basque diaspora.

=== Modern pentathlon ===
Yane Marques is the only person born in South America to win an Olympic medal in modern pentathlon (until the Tokyo 2020 Olympic Games), having also been the first person in Latin America to do so.

=== Motorsports ===
South America has several drivers who won the Formula One championship multiple times, including five-time champion Juan Fangio of Argentina, and Brazilian drivers Emerson Fittipaldi (2 titles), Nelson Piquet (3 titles), and Ayrton Senna (3 titles). Brazil has hosted the Brazilian Grand Prix every year since 1973 and the Argentine Grand Prix has hosted Formula One on 20 occasions.

In Motos, South America had notable drivers as Johnny Cecotto, Carlos Lavado, Alex Barros, Sebastian Porto, Martín Cárdenas and Yonny Hernández. Also, South America has hosted the Moto GP in Venezuela (1977–1979), Brazil (1987–1989, 1992; 1995–1997, 1999–2004 as Rio Grand Prix) and Argentina (1961–1963, 1981–1982, 1987, 1994–1995, 1998–1999, 2014–2019, 2022-2023).

The Dakar Rally is also hosted by South America from 2009 to 2019 (mostly in Chile and Argentina).

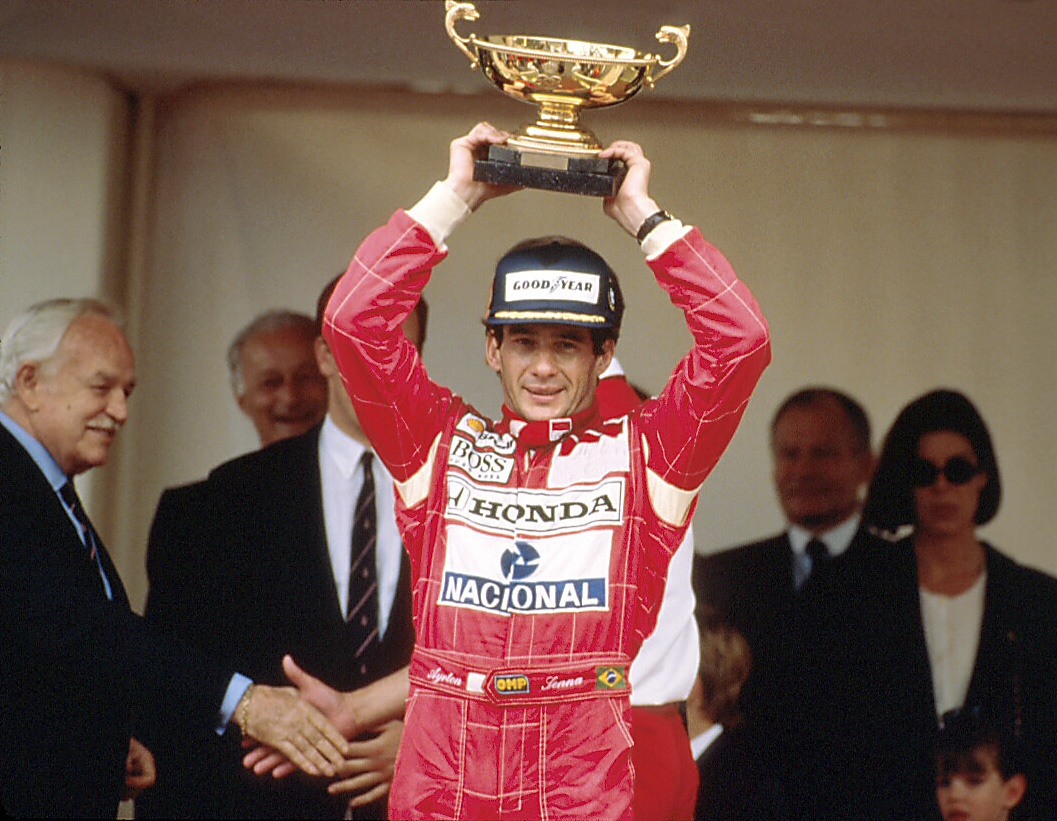
Ayrton Senna, the most successful Brazilian driver in Formula One

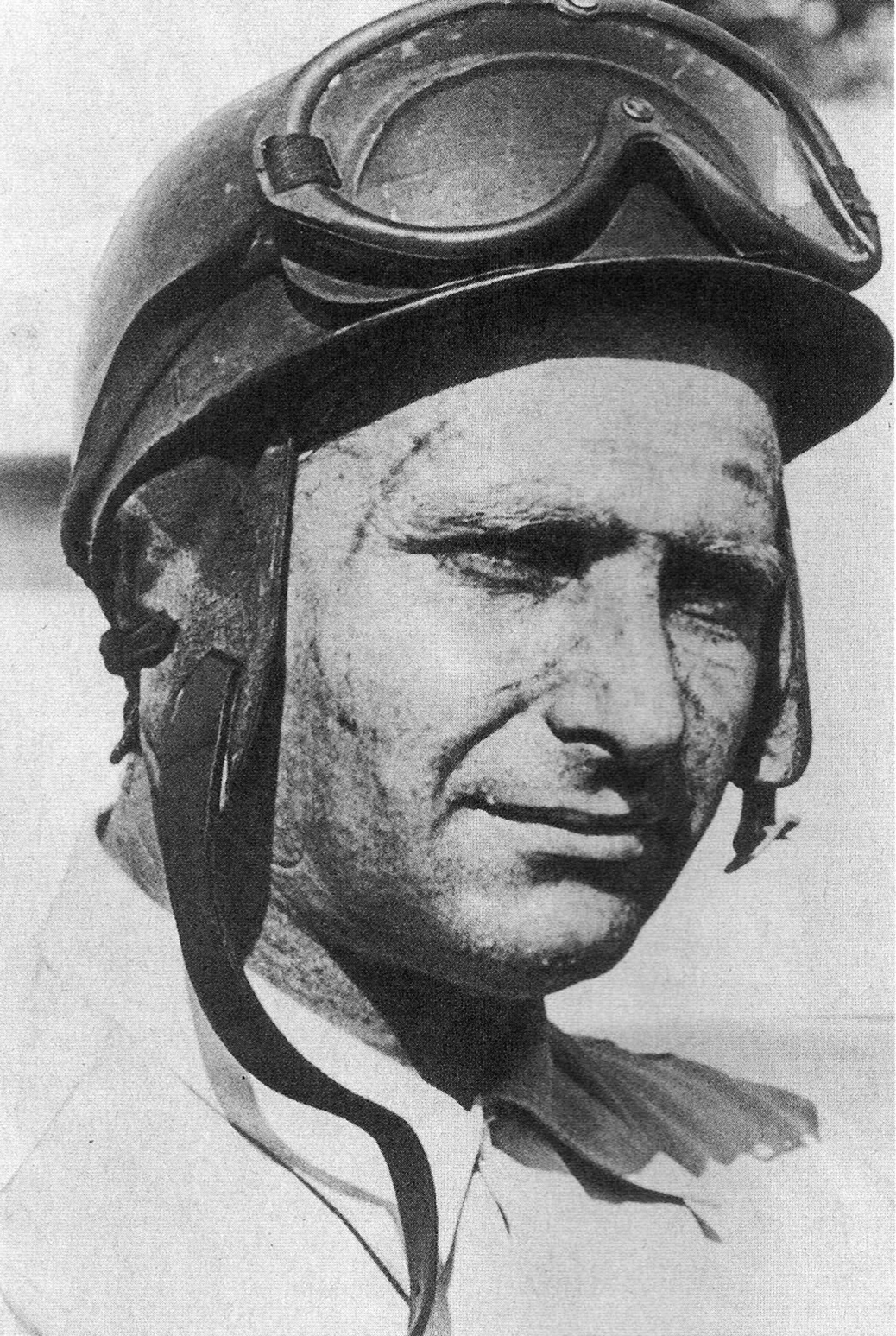
Juan Manuel Fangio

=== Skateboarding ===
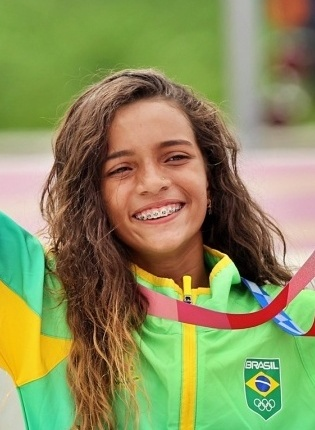
Rayssa Leal

Skateboarding is very popular in Brazil, especially in large urban centers. The country has internationally renowned skaters like Bob Burnquist, Sandro Dias, Rayssa Leal, Pedro Barros, Kelvin Hoefler, Augusto Akio, Pâmela Rosa and Letícia Bufoni. Peru is a country that shows a certain degree of development in skateboarding, having sent representatives like Ángelo Caro to World Championships and the Olympics.

=== Surfing ===
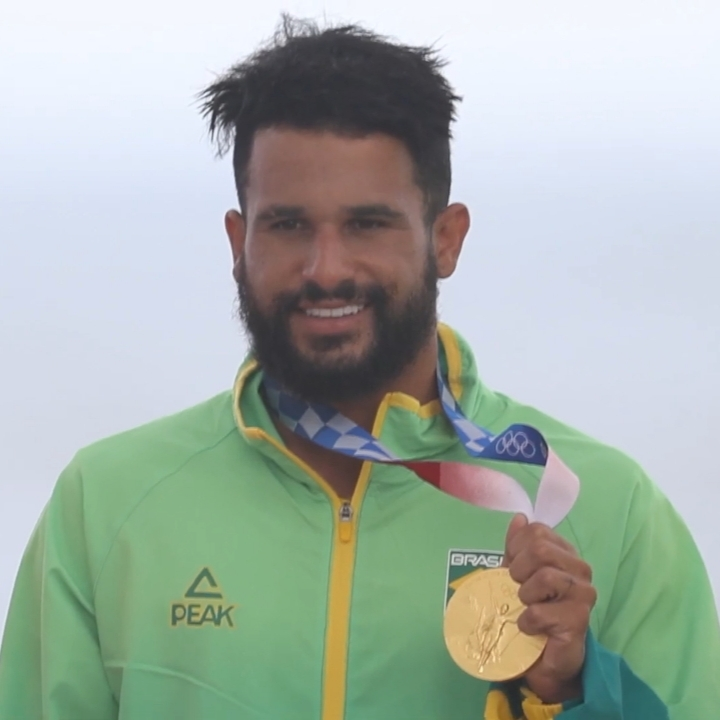
Ítalo Ferreira

Surfing is very popular in Brazil. The country has progressively evolved to become one of the biggest forces in the sport in the world. Fábio Gouveia reached number 5 in the world in 1992. In the 2010s, the Brazilian Storm appears, with several Brazilians getting closer to the world title, until Gabriel Medina conquers the same in 2014 and Adriano de Souza wins in 2015. In 2020 surfing ascends to the category of Olympic sport and Ítalo Ferreira becomes Olympic champion. Filipe Toledo was also world champion, in 2022. Peru also has renowned surfers such as Lucca Mesinas and Miguel Tudela.

=== Swimming ===
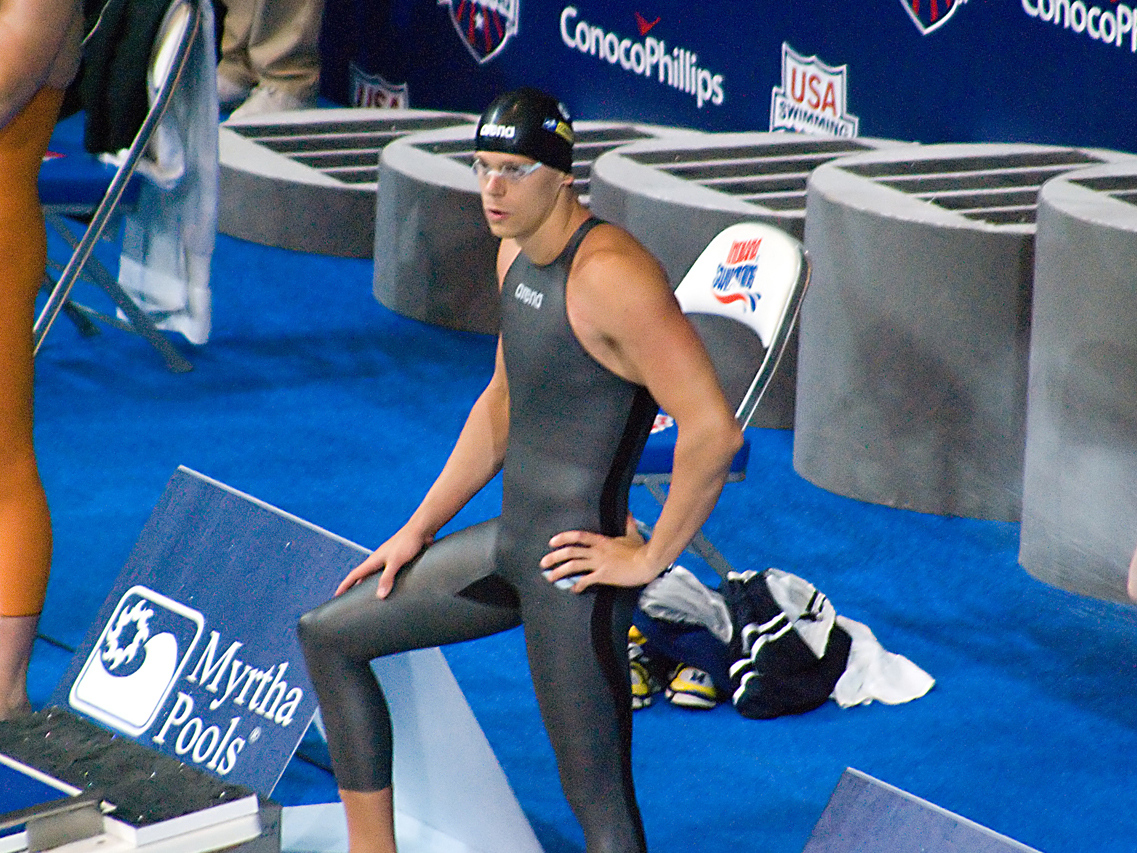
César Cielo

Brazil is the greatest South American power in swimming, competing on an equal footing with the world's powers in this sport, especially in men's swimming. Some of the greatest exponents of Brazilian swimming history are: César Cielo, Ricardo Prado, Gustavo Borges, Fernando Scherer, Thiago Pereira, Djan Madruga, Bruno Fratus, Manuel dos Santos, Tetsuo Okamoto, Nicholas Santos, Felipe França, Fernando Scheffer, Kaio de Almeida, João Gomes Júnior, Felipe Lima, Guilherme Costa, Ana Marcela Cunha, Etiene Medeiros and Poliana Okimoto. Argentina was the main force on the continent until the 1960s, with historically important swimmers such as Luis Nicolao, José Meolans and Georgina Bardach. Other countries like Venezuela (with Francisco Sánchez, Rafael Vidal and Albert Subirats) and Chile (with Kristel Kobrich) tend to reveal talent from time to time. Brazil hosted the 1995 FINA World Swimming Championships (25 m) and won the 2014 FINA World Swimming Championships (25 m).

=== Tennis ===
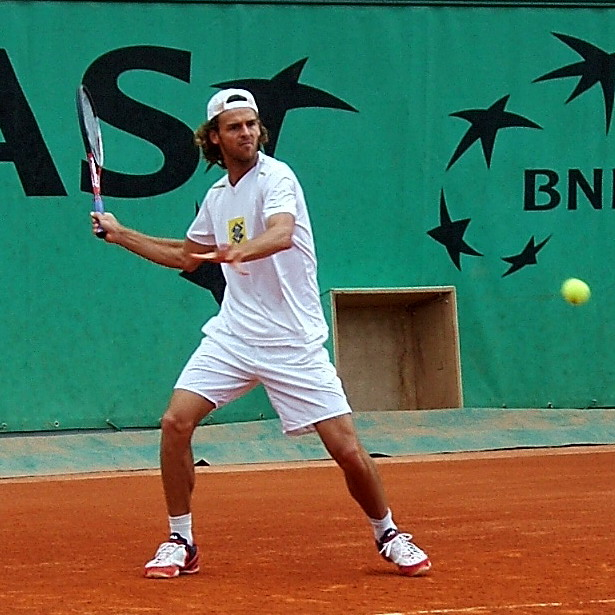
Gustavo Kuerten at the 2005 French Open

South America has produced a number of talented tennis players such as Maria Bueno, the greatest South American tennis player, three-time French Open winner Gustavo Kuerten, four-time Grand Slam and Masters winner Guillermo Vilas, the first Latin American ranked number 1 in Association of Tennis Professionals (ATP) Marcelo Ríos, the first Latin American World number 1 in women tennis and the first Latin American to win a Grand Slam Anita Lizana, US Open winner Gabriela Sabatini, French Open winners Gastón Gaudio and Andrés Gómez, 2009 US Open winner Juan Martín del Potro, and double Olympic Gold medalist Nicolás Massú. In doubles, the continent has already produced players like Marcelo Melo, Bruno Soares, Luisa Stefani, Juan Sebastián Cabal and Robert Farah. The continent hosts ATP tournaments, such as the ATP 500 in Rio de Janeiro, Brazil, and the ATP 250 in Buenos Aires and Córdoba, in Argentina, and the ATP 250 in Chile. Argentina was Davis Cup champion in 2016, and Brazil was a semi-finalist twice, in 1992 and 2000. Chile has already reached the quarterfinals three times.

=== Table tennis ===
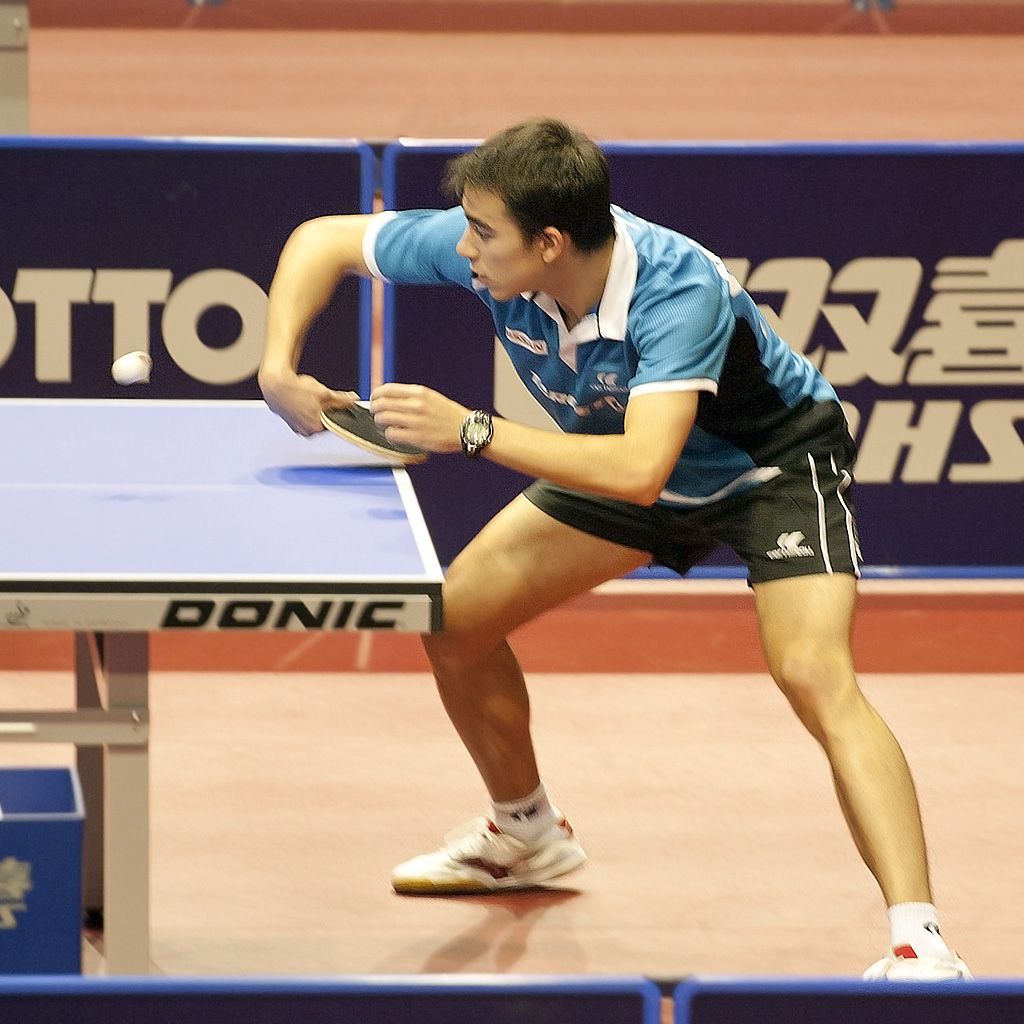
Hugo Calderano

Table tennis is very popular and widely played in Brazil, and the country has a considerable tradition in this sport. The greatest player in the history of the country is Hugo Calderano, who reached number 2 in the world in 2026 (becoming the greatest Americas player of all time), and was the first male table tennis player from the Americas to win the Table Tennis World Cup, reach the final of the World Table Tennis Championships and reach the semi-finals of the Olympic Games. Other historically important players in the country are Gustavo Tsuboi, Cláudio Kano, Hugo Hoyama, Biriba, Cazuo Matsumoto, Thiago Monteiro and Bruna Takahashi. The best players from Argentina so far have been Liu Song, Gastón Alto and Horacio Cifuentes. For Chile, the player Berta Rodríguez stood out.

=== Weightlifting ===
Weightlifting is popular in Colombia and has been evolving in Brazil. Some of the top Colombian weightlifters are: María Isabel Urrutia, Óscar Figueroa, Mabel Mosquera and Diego Fernando Salazar. The greatest exponent of this sport in Brazil were Fernando Reis and Laura Amaro.

=== Yachting and Equestrianism ===
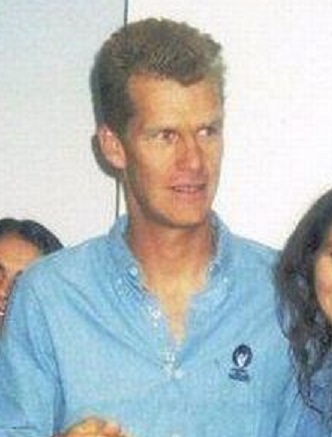
Robert Scheidt

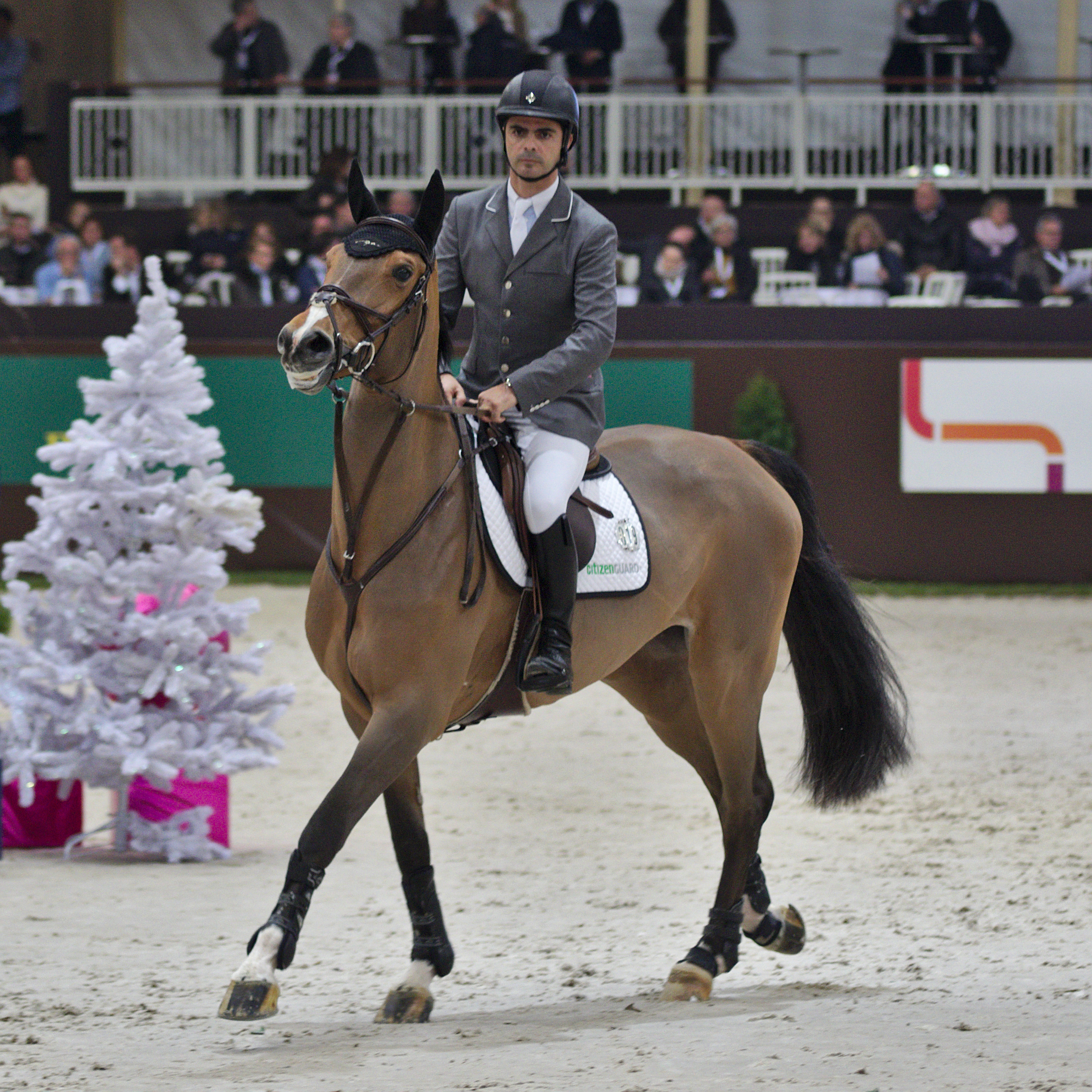
Rodrigo Pessoa

Despite yachting and equestrianism being inaccessible sports for the general population, Brazil has a great tradition in yachting, and, to a lesser extent, but no less important, tradition in equestrianism. The biggest center for these sports in South America is Rio de Janeiro and its neighboring city Niterói. Several Olympic medalists in yachting have trained in Guanabara Bay, such as Martine Grael, Clinio Freitas, Daniel Adler, Eduardo Penido, Isabel Swan, Kiko Pellicano, Marcelo Ferreira, Marcos Soares, Nelson Falcão and Ronaldo Senfft. The country also has olympic medalists from São Paulo Robert Scheidt, Torben Grael, Kahena Kunze, Reinaldo Conrad, Alexandre Welter, Bruno Prada and Peter Ficker. In equestrianism, the Gávea Hippodrome trained athletes such as Rodrigo Pessoa and his father Nelson Pessoa, as well as Luiz Felipe de Azevedo; the country also has olympic medalists from São Paulo Álvaro de Miranda Neto and from Rio Grande do Sul André Johannpeter. Argentina also trains high-level athletes in yachting, with some Olympic medals. Santiago Lange and Cecilia Carranza were Olympic champions in 2016, and the country still had 4 silvers and 5 bronzes in yachting by the 2020 games. The country has already won an Olympic silver in equestrian with Carlos Moratorio. Chile won 2 Olympic silvers in 1952 in equestrianism, mainly with the help of Óscar Cristi.

== Games ==
=== Core Games ===
- South American Games
- South American Beach Games
- South American Masters Games
- South American University Games
- Bolivarian Games
- ALBA Games
- Ibero American Games

=== Related Games ===
- Pan American Games
- Parapan American Games
- Pan American Masters Games
- Central American and Caribbean Games
- Caribbean Games
- Pacific Ocean Games

== Regions Championships ==
Some of sports have different regional championships, for example Latin American Table Tennis Championships and Latin America Amateur Championship or Ibero-American Championships in Athletics.

=== Main Regions ===
- Americas:Pan American Games
- South America: South American Championships
- Ibero-America: Ibero American Championships (Athletics and Weightlifting)
- Latin America: Latin American Championships (Table Tennis, Golf, Latin Cup)

=== Sub Regions ===
- Andean States (Bolivarian Games)
- Bolivarian Alliance for the Americas (Simon Bolivar Weightlifting Championships or Cups / Copa Simon Bolivar in Athletics)
- Northern South America (Beach Soccer:Copa América de Beach Soccer)
- Southern Cone (Beach Soccer:Copa América de Beach Soccer)
- Pacific Rim (Pacific Rim Championships, Pan Pacific Swimming Championships)

== Tournaments ==
For National Teams

- Copa América
- Copa América de Futsal
- Copa América de Beach Soccer
- South American Basketball Championship
- South America Volleyball Championship
- South American Handball Championship
- South American Baseball Championship
- South American Cricket Championship
- South American Rugby Championship
- Roller Hockey Pan American Championships
- Men's South American Hockey Championship

For Clubs

- Copa Libertadores
- Copa Libertadores de Futsal
- Copa Libertadores de Fútbol Playa
- Campeonato Sudamericano de Clubes Campeones de Básquetbol
- South American Volleyball Club Championship
- South American Men's Club Handball Championship
- Super Rugby Americas
- Roller Hockey South American Club Championship

== See also ==
- Sport in Africa
- Sport in Asia
- Sport in Europe
- Sport in Latin America
- Sport in North America
- Sport in Oceania
