= Iulia Hasdeu National College =

Iulia Hasdeu National College may refer to one of two educational institutions in Romania:

- Iulia Hasdeu National College (Bucharest)
- Iulia Hasdeu National College (Lugoj)
