= Sailing at the 1980 Summer Olympics – Tornado =

Sailing at the Olympics

Tornado at the Games of the XXII Olympiad
- Tornado
- Venue: Tallinn
- Dates: 21 to 29 July
- Competitors: 22 from 11 nations
- Teams: 11

Medalists
1st place, gold medalist(s)		Alexandre Welter; Lars Sigurd Bjorkstrom	Brazil
2nd place, silver medalist(s)		Peter Due; Per Kjergard	Denmark
3rd place, bronze medalist(s)		Göran Marström; Jörgen Ragnarsson	Sweden

The Tornado was a sailing event on the Sailing at the 1980 Summer Olympics program in Tallinn, USSR. Seven races were scheduled. 22 sailors, on 11 boats, from 11 nations competed.

== Results ==
Rank	Helmsman (Country)	Crew	Race I		Race II		Race III		Race IV		Race V		Race VI		Race VII		Total Points	Total -1
Rank	Helmsman (Country)	Crew	Rank	Points	Rank	Points	Rank	Points	Rank	Points	Rank	Points	Rank	Points	Rank	Points	Total Points	Total -1
1st place, gold medalist(s)	Alexandre Welter (BRA)	Lars Sigurd Bjorkstrom	3	5.7	1	0.0	3	5.7	~~6~~	~~11.7~~	1	0.0	1	0.0	5	10.0	33.1	21.4
2nd place, silver medalist(s)	Peter Due (DEN)	Per Kjergard	~~7~~	~~13.0~~	2	3.0	2	3.0	3	5.7	2	3.0	5	10.0	3	5.7	43.4	30.4
3rd place, bronze medalist(s)	Göran Marström (SWE)	Jörgen Ragnarsson	1	0.0	4	8.0	~~7~~	~~13.0~~	2	3.0	6	11.7	2	3.0	4	8.0	46.7	33.7
4	Viktor Potapov (URS)	Aleksandr Zõbin	~~6~~	~~11.7~~	3	5.7	5	10.0	4	8.0	3	5.7	3	5.7	1	0.0	46.8	35.1
5	Willem van Walt Meijer (NED)	Govert Brasser	4	8.0	5	10.0	1	0.0	5	10.0	4	8.0	~~6~~	~~11.7~~	2	3.0	50.7	39.0
6	Pekka Narko (FIN)	Juha Siira	5	10.0	~~6~~	~~11.7~~	4	8.0	1	0.0	5	10.0	4	8.0	6	11.7	59.4	47.7
7	Hubert Porkert (AUT)	Hermann Kupfner	2	3.0	7	13.0	6	11.7	~~RET~~	~~18.0~~	7	13.0	7	13.0	8	14.0	85.7	67.7
8	Uwe Steingross (GDR)	Jörg Schramme	8	14.0	8	14.0	8	14.0	7	13.0	8	14.0	~~RET~~	~~18.0~~	7	13.0	100.0	82.0
9	Bogdan Kramer (POL)	Jarogniew Krüger	~~9~~	~~15.0~~	9	15.0	9	15.0	9	15.0	10	16.0	8	14.0	9	15.0	105.0	89.0
10	Tsvetan Penchev (BUL)	Krasimir Krastev	11	17.0	10	16.0	10	16.0	8	14.0	9	15.0	~~RET~~	~~18.0~~	10	16.0	112.0	94.0
11	Andrei Chiliman (ROM)	Cătălin Luchian	10	16.0	~~11~~	~~17.0~~	11	17.0	10	16.0	11	17.0	9	15.0	11	17.0	115.0	98.0

DNF = Did Not Finish, DNS= Did Not Start, DSQ = Disqualified, PMS = Premature Start, YMP = Yacht Materially Prejudiced
= Male, = Female

=== Daily standings ===
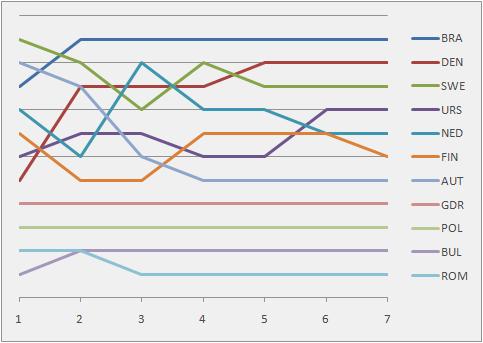
Graph showing the daily standings in the Tornado during the 1980 Summer Olympics
