= Andrei Chiliman =

Romanian sailor

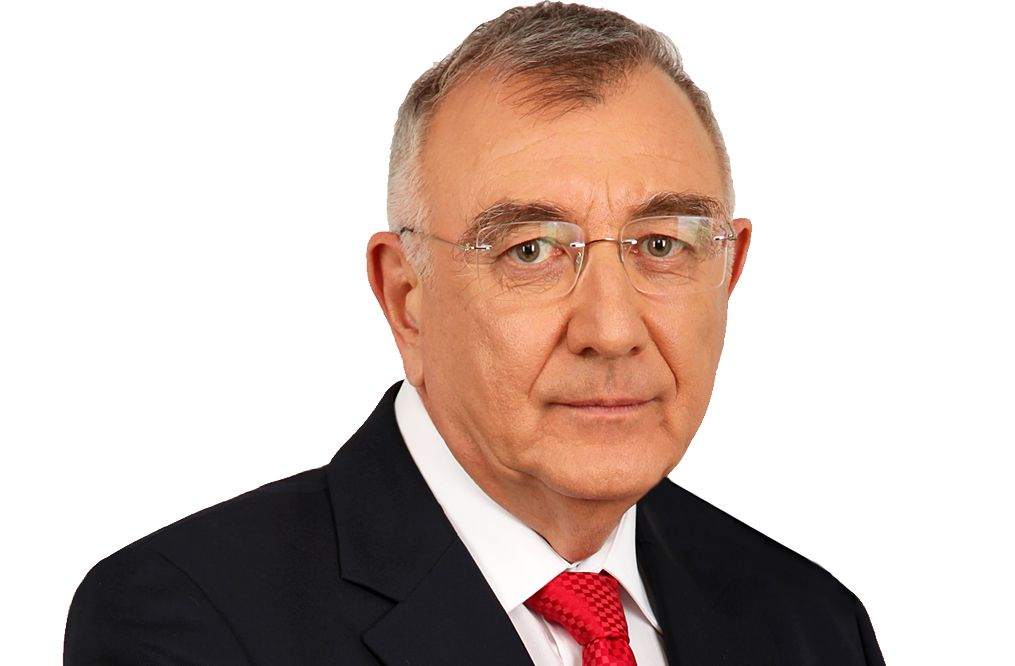

Personal information
- Nationality: Romanian
- Born: 18 July 1947 (age 77); Bucharest, Kingdom of Romania

Sport
- Sport: Sailing

Andrei Chiliman (born 18 July 1947) is a Romanian sailor, engineer, and politician. He competed in the Tornado event at the 1980 Summer Olympics.

Born in Bucharest, he attended the city's Ion Luca Caragiale and Iulia Hasdeu high schools. In 1970 he graduated from the Automatics Faculty of Politehnica University of Bucharest. A member of the National Liberal Party since December 1989, he was elected in June 2004 mayor of Sector 1 of Bucharest, serving in this position until June 2015.
