= Cătălin Luchian =

Romanian sailor

Personal information
- Nationality: Romanian
- Born: 8 May 1962 (age 63)

Sport
- Sport: Sailing

Cătălin Luchian (born 8 May 1962) is a Romanian sailor. He competed in the Tornado event at the 1980 Summer Olympics.
