= Govert Brasser =

Dutch sailor (born 1957)

Personal information
- Full name: Govert Jacob Willem Brasser
- Nationality: Dutch
- Born: 24 April 1957 (age 69) The Hague
- Height: 1.88 m (6.2 ft)

Sailing career
- Sport: Sailing
- Class: Tornado
- Updated on 2014-01-09

Govert Jacob Willem Brasser (born 24 April 1957, in The Hague) is a sailor from the Netherlands. Since the Netherlands did boycott the Moscow Olympic Games Brasser represented his National Olympic Committee at the 1980 Summer Olympics, which was boycotted by several countries, in Tallinn, USSR under the Dutch NOC flag. With Willem van Walt Meijer as helmsman, Brasser took the 5th place in the Tornado.

== Sources ==
- "Govert Brasser Bio, Stats, and Results". Olympic Sports. Sports-Reference.com. Archived from the original on 2014-01-09.
- "Zeilers:, We gaan'". De Telegraaf (in Dutch). De Telegraaf. 1980-05-16.
- "Zeilploeg bleef buiten de medailles". Leeuwarder Courant : Hoofdblad van Friesland (in Dutch). De Telegraaf. 1980-07-30.
- "Staartjes: "Het heeft niet meegezeten" Geen medailles voor Nederlandse zeilers". De waarheid (in Dutch). 1980-07-31.
- "Franse zeilploeg blijft thuis". Amigoe (in Dutch). 1980-05-22.
- "Games of the XXII Olympiad, Volume I: Moscow, Tallinn, Leningrad, Kiev and Minsk" (PDF). Fizkultura i Sport Publishers. 1981. Archived from the original (PDF) on 2013-10-17.
- "Games of the XXII Olympiad, Volume II: Organisation" (PDF). Fizkultura i Sport Publishers. 1981. Archived from the original (PDF) on 2013-10-17.
- "Games of the XXII Olympiad, Volume III: Participants and Results" (PDF). Fizkultura i Sport Publishers. 1981. Archived from the original (PDF) on October 17, 2013.
