= Bogdan Kramer =

Polish sailor

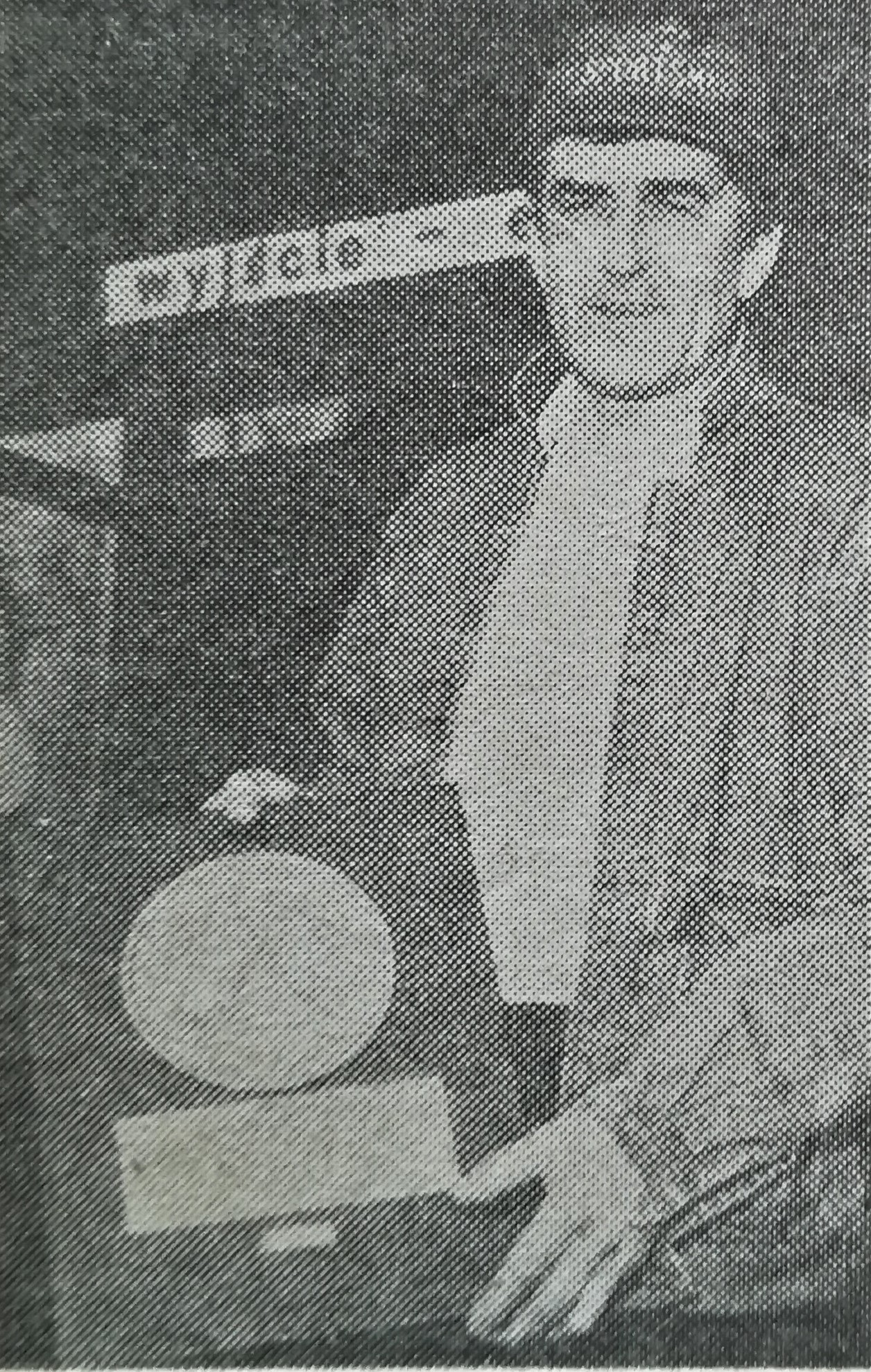

Personal information
- Nationality: Polish
- Born: 18 April 1944 (age 82) Kiekrz, Poland

Sport
- Sport: Sailing

Bogdan Kramer (born 18 April 1944) is a Polish sailor. He competed in the Tornado event at the 1980 Summer Olympics.
