= Willem van Walt Meijer =

Dutch sailor (born 1958)

Personal information
- Full name: Willem Scato van Walt Meijer
- Nationality: Dutch
- Born: 8 July 1958 (age 68) Rotterdam
- Height: 1.87 m (6.1 ft)

Sailing career
- Sport: Sailing
- Classes: 470; Tornado; Star; Soling; Dragon
- Updated on 2014-01-30

Willem Scato van Walt Meijer (born 8 July 1958 in Rotterdam) is a sailor from the Netherlands, Since the Netherlands did boycott the Moscow Olympic Games Van Walt Meijer represented his National Olympic Committee at the 1980 Summer Olympics, which was boycotted by several countries, in Tallinn, USSR under the Dutch NOC flag. With Govert Brasser as crew, Van Walt Meijer took the 5th place in the Tornado. Van Walt Meijer returned as crew with Boudewijn Binkhorst in the Star to the 1984 Olympics. There they took 8th place.

== Sailing career ==
Van Walt Meijer started his international sailing career in the Vaurien. Via the 470 he moved to the Tornado. After the 1980 Summer Olympics Van Walt Meijer briefly tried in 1982 the Soling and the Australian 18ft Skiff before he continued his Olympic career in the Star. Nowadays Van Walt Meijer sails on an irregular basis in the Dragon and the Melges 24.

== Professional life ==
Van Walt Meijer studied from 1976 till 1983 on the Groningen University and on the Northwestern University – Kellogg School of Management from 2002 till 2003. After his military service at the Koninklijke Militaire Academie of the Dutch Army Van Walt Meijer held the following positions:

- Unilever 1984–2004
  - Marketing & Sales Managers positions at Calvé
  - Business Unit Head Foods Indonesia
  - Marketing Director Ireland
  - Strategy Member Foods Division
  - Senior Vice President Foods Central & Eastern Europe
  - CEO Russia & Ukraine
  - Senior Vice President Frozen Foods
- CEO The Greenery 2004–2005
- Royal Friesland Foods 2005–2008
  - Interim manager Central Europe
  - CEO Friesland Foods Cheese & Leader Classic Dairy
- CEO Midoceanbrands 2008–2012
- Non-Executive Director & Head of the Audit Committee Milkiland 2010 – Present
- Managing Director International Markets Polyconcept & Polyconcept Hong Kong Ltd. 2013 – Present

== Sources ==
- "Willem van Walt Meijer Bio, Stats, and Results". Olympic Sports. Sports-Reference.com. Archived from the original on 2020-04-18.
- "Zeilers:, We gaan'". De Telegraaf (in Dutch). 1980-05-16.
- "Zeilploeg bleef buiten de medailles". Leeuwarder Courant : Hoofdblad van Friesland (in Dutch). De Telegraaf. 1980-07-30.
- "Staartjes: "Het heeft niet meegezeten" Geen medailles voor Nederlandse zeilers". De waarheid (in Dutch). 1980-07-31.
- "Franse zeilploeg blijft thuis". Amigoe (in Dutch). 1980-05-22.
- "Games of the XXII Olympiad, Volume I: Moscow, Tallinn, Leningrad, Kiev and Minsk" (PDF). Fizkultura i Sport Publishers. 1981. Archived from the original (PDF) on October 17, 2013.
- "Games of the XXII Olympiad, Volume II: Organisation" (PDF). Fizkultura i Sport Publishers. 1981. Archived from the original (PDF) on October 17, 2013.
- "Games of the XXII Olympiad, Volume III: Participants and Results" (PDF). Fizkultura i Sport Publishers. 1981. Archived from the original (PDF) on October 17, 2013.
- "Oranje équipe met 207 personen op de Zomerspelen". Dagblad De Telegraaf (in Dutch). 1984-07-11.
- "Toppers bijeen in Hyeres Olympisch zeilexamen". Dagblad De Telegraaf (in Dutch). 1984-04-19.
- "Aspiraties". Dagblad De Telegraaf (in Dutch). 1984-04-30.
- "Verwachtingen voor Los Angeles hoog gespannen Gouden kansen voor olympische zeilptoeg". Dagblad De Telegraaf (in Dutch). 1984-07-28.
- "Zeilcoach rekent op een medaille". Dagblad De Telegraaf (in Dutch). 1984-07-31.
- "Zeilers smeken om meer wind". Dagblad De Telegraaf (in Dutch). 1984-08-03.
- "Zeilers verspelen kansen op medaille Tijdperk 'Vliegende Hollanders' voorbij". Dagblad De Telegraaf (in Dutch). 1984-08-08.
- "Surfgoud kan impuls geven Watersport wacht op frisse wind". Dagblad De Telegraaf (in Dutch). 1984-08-11.
- Official Report Los Angeles 1984, Volume 1: Organization and Planning (part 1) (PDF). Los Angeles: Los Angeles Olympic Organizing Committee. 1985. Archived from the original (PDF) on January 28, 2015.
- Official Report Los Angeles 1984, Volume 1: Organization and Planning (part 2) (PDF). Los Angeles: Los Angeles Olympic Organizing Committee. 1985. Archived from the original (PDF) on October 17, 2013.
- Official Report Los Angeles 1984, Volume 1: Organization and Planning (part 3) (PDF). Los Angeles: Los Angeles Olympic Organizing Committee. 1985. Archived from the original (PDF) on October 17, 2013.
- Official Report Los Angeles 1984, Volume 2: Competition and Summary and Results (part 1) (PDF). Los Angeles: Los Angeles Olympic Organizing Committee. 1985. Archived from the original (PDF) on October 17, 2013.
- Official Report Los Angeles 1984, Volume 2: Competition and Summary and Results (part 2) (PDF). Los Angeles: Los Angeles Olympic Organizing Committee. 1985. Archived from the original (PDF) on October 7, 2013.
- Official Report Los Angeles 1984, Volume 2: Competition and Summary and Results (part 3) (PDF). Los Angeles: Los Angeles Olympic Organizing Committee. 1985. Archived from the original (PDF) on October 17, 2013.
- "Willem Van Walt Meijer". www.linkedin.com.
