= Krasimir Krastev (sailor) =

Bulgarian sailor

Personal information
- Nationality: Bulgarian
- Born: 10 January 1910

Sport
- Sport: Sailing

Krasimir Krastev (Bulgarian: Красимир Кръстев; born 10 January 1910, date of death unknown) was a Bulgarian sailor. He competed in the Tornado event at the 1980 Summer Olympics.
