= Hubert Porkert =

Austrian sailor

Personal information
- Nationality: Austrian
- Born: 25 September 1939 (age 85); Zell am See, Nazi Germany

Sport
- Sport: Sailing

Hubert Porkert (born 25 September 1939) is an Austrian sailor. He competed in the Tornado event at the 1980 Summer Olympics.
