= Jarogniew Krüger =

Polish sailor (1946–2019)

Personal information
- Nationality: Polish
- Born: 23 November 1946; Poznań, Poland
- Died: 7 March 2019 (aged 72)

Sport
- Sport: Sailing

Jarogniew Krüger (23 November 1946 – 7 March 2019) was a Polish sailor. He competed in the Tornado event at the 1980 Summer Olympics.
