= Lars Sigurd Björkström =

Swedish-born Brazilian sailor

Lars Bjorkström
Medal record

Men's sailing

Representing Brazil

Olympic Games
Gold medal – first place	1980 Moscow	Tornado

Lars Sigurd Björkström (born 19 November 1943) is a Swedish-born Brazilian sailor and Olympic Champion. He competed at the 1980 Summer Olympics in Moscow and won a gold medal with Alexandre Welter in the Tornado class.
