= Tsvetan Penchev =

Bulgarian sailor

Personal information
- Nationality: Bulgarian
- Born: 20 March 1953 (age 72)

Sport
- Sport: Sailing

Tsvetan Penchev (Bulgarian: Цветан Пенчев; born 20 March 1953) is a Bulgarian sailor. He competed in the Tornado event at the 1980 Summer Olympics.
