= Hermann Kupfner =

Austrian sailor

Personal information
- Nationality: Austrian
- Born: 31 December 1957 (age 67)

Sport
- Sport: Sailing

Hermann Kupfner (born 31 December 1957) is an Austrian sailor. He competed in the Tornado event at the 1980 Summer Olympics.
