= Göran Marström =

Swedish sailor

Göran Marström (born 12 October 1942) is a former Swedish sailor who competed in four Summer Olympics. Marström won a bronze medal in the Tornado class at the 1980 Summer Olympics together with Jörgen Ragnarsson.
