= Jörgen Ragnarsson =

Swedish sailor (born 1954)

Jörgen Ragnarsson (born 19 May 1954) is a former Swedish sailor who competed in the 1980 Summer Olympics, where he won a bronze medal in the Tornado class together with Göran Marström.
