= South America Volleyball Championship =

South America Volleyball Championship may refer to

- South American Men's Volleyball Championship
- South American Women's Volleyball Championship
