= Alexandre Welter =

Brazilian sailor (born 1953)

Alex Welter
Personal information
- Full name: Alexandre Welter
- Born: 30 June 1953 (age 73) São Paulo, Brazil
- Height: 186 cm (6 ft 1 in)

Sailing career
- Sport: Sailing
Medal record
Men's sailing
Representing Brazil
Olympic Games
Gold medal – first place	1980 Moscow	Tornado

Alexandre "Alex" Welter (born 30 June 1953) is a Brazilian sailor and Olympic champion. He won a gold medal in the Tornado Class at the 1980 Summer Olympics in Moscow, alongside Lars Sigurd Bjorkstrom.
