= South American Volleyball Club Championship =

South American Volleyball Club Championship may refer to

- Men's South American Volleyball Club Championship
- Women's South American Volleyball Club Championship
