= Iulia Hasdeu National College (Lugoj) =

Coordinates: 45.687004°N 21.907178°E

The Iulia Hasdeu National College (Romanian: Colegiul Național Iulia Hasdeu) is a high school located at 1 Victor Vlad Delamarina Street in Lugoj, Timiș County, Romania.

The school's origins can be traced to the 1903 founding of the Civilian Girls' School. In 1915, this became a Hungarian-language community school, the Gymnasial Community School. In September 1919, following the area's union with Romania, the language of instruction switched to Romanian. In 1920, it became a state school, the Romanian Civilian State Middle School. In 1925, the institution was renamed the Girls' Gymnasium; it became the Girls' High School the following year. In 1927, it was named in honor of poet Iulia Hasdeu. Following the 1948 education reform under the nascent communist regime, the school had eleven grades. It was reduced to ten grades in 1954, when it was renamed Middle School nr. 15. It was refashioned into a high school in 1965. Following the Romanian Revolution, the Hasdeu name was restored in 1990. The distinction of national college was granted in 2004.
