= Iulia Hasdeu National College (Bucharest) =

- Colegiul Național Iulia Hasdeu

Location
- Ferdinand I Boulevard, no. 91; Bucharest, 021384; Romania
- Coordinates: 44°26′37.1″N 26°07′42″E

Information
- Type: Public high school
- Motto: Voi reuși prin mine însumi! (I am going to succeed through myself!)
- Established: 20 July 1926
- Principal: Marian Gaspar Fieraru
- Teaching staff: 80
- Employees: 25
- Grades: 9 to 12
- Gender: coeducation
- Age range: 14–19
- Enrollment: c. 1,000
- Average class size: 30
- Language: Romanian
- Hours in school day: 6
- Area: 7,461 m^{2} (80,310 sq ft)
- Campus type: Urban
- Nickname: CNIH
- Website: cnih.ro

The Iulia Hasdeu National College (Romanian: Colegiul Național Iulia Hasdeu) is a high school located in the eastern part of Bucharest, Romania, right at the crossroad of Ferdinand I Boulevard and Mihai Bravu Highway. It is one of the secondary education institutions in Bucharest. It was named after poet Iulia Hasdeu.

Established in 1926, Iulia Hasdeu National College provides education of European standards, complemented by a range of extracurricular activities, including clubs such as Photography, Model United Nations, Debate, Architecture, Theater, and Film, among others.

== International Projects ==
- Erasmus

The college participated in the Erasmus+ project titled “Radio, adolescentes y noticias. Un proyecto para la educación inclusiva en Europa” from 2017 to 2019, in collaboration with four educational institutions from Spain, France, Bulgaria, and Hungary. The project aimed to promote inclusive education for disadvantaged groups, focusing on their integration into society through the use of new technologies for creating media materials. It emphasized three educational dimensions: the fundamental values of the European Union, communication in Spanish, and artistic education. The initiative included international meetings for teacher training and student exchanges, including a long-term meeting in Córdoba, Spain. In October 2017, the first teacher training activity was held in Córdoba, and from November 13–17, 2017, National College "Iulia Hasdeu" hosted the first transnational coordinator meeting and a student exchange focused on ethnic and religious inclusion, with representation from teachers and 12 students under the guidance of the school's principal, Marian Gaspar Fieraru.

- PEEP (Pan European Educational Project)

PEEP is an international initiative involving Romania, Greece, Slovakia, the Netherlands, Russia, the Czech Republic, Italy, and Hungary, launched in the early 1990s. Romania has participated for over 25 years, with cultural exchanges focused on Culture, Science, and History. Each year, five students and one teacher from each country engage in research and presentations, using English for communication. An artistic component, the International Theatre Project (ITP), was added about 18 years ago, allowing students to perform and create plays. An annual evaluation conference discusses project outcomes and future plans, emphasizing the project's role in promoting international understanding and cooperation.

== Bibliography ==
cnih.ro/despre
