= Pacific Cup (yacht race) =

Boat race

Event information
- Race area: Pacific Ocean
- Sponsor: Pacific Cup Yacht Club
- Distance: 2,070-nautical-mile (3,830 km)
- First race: 1980
- Former names: West Marine Pacific Cup
- Website: https://pacificcup.org/

Succession
- Previous: July 2024
- Next: July 2026

The Pacific Cup (formerly the "West Marine Pacific Cup") is a yacht race from San Francisco, California to Kaneohe, Hawaii on the island of Oahu. This exercise in yacht racing is run in even-numbered years by the Pacific Cup Yacht Club, while in odd years the Transpacific Yacht Race sails for Hawaii out of Los Angeles. While it is billed as "The Fun Race to Hawaii," racers take preparation seriously. A number of seminars and resources are provided to help sailors and crew find safety and success. The level of competition rises each year, with yachts coming in from around the world, including Switzerland and Japan.

The race has run for over 20 years. Hundreds of boats, from 24-foot (7.3 m) double handers to 140-foot spectaculars, have sailed the 2,070-nautical-mile (3,830 km) course. Even smaller, experimental boats have been known to participate. A wide variety of people partake in the race, including families, avid racers, and "sail of a lifetime" efforts.

The first start for 2016 occurred on July 11 at the starting line off the St. Francis Yacht Club in San Francisco Bay. 64 entrants participated in the 2016 race.

Manouch Moshayedi's 100' super maxi Rio 100 set a new Pacific Cup fastest passage record on July 20, 2016 with an elapsed time of 5 days, 2 hours, 41 minutes and 13 seconds. The previous record was set in 2004 by Robert Miller's 139' Mari-Cha IV with an elapsed time of 5 days, 5 hours, 38 minutes and 10 seconds.

The 2020 race was canceled due to the COVID-19 pandemic.

== How to participate ==
=== Entry ===
The Pacific Cup Yacht Club provides all the forms necessary to enter the race online. A competitor can do the bulk of their entry process over the web, only mailing in a signed entry form and a check.

=== Requirements ===
The Notice of Race and Sailing Instructions contain the equipment and other requirements for the boat. These start with the ISAF Special Regulations for Category 1 races, as modified by the U.S. Prescriptions. The NOR and SIs make some modest changes to the regulations in view of the nature of the race.

=== Preparation ===
Getting ready for the race is an effort of several months at a minimum. Typical preparation budgets, from entry fee to post-arrival rum, run from 20 to 60 thousand dollars and up.

With on-water times from five to seventeen days, twenty-four hours a day, this is the equivalent of running a hundred round-the-buoys races back to back. Reliability, flexibility, and spare parts are the keys to a successful preparation.

The best, and classic, reference for the aspiring Pacific racer is Jim and Sue Corenman's Pacific Cup Handbook.

The PCYC provides a collection of race tips including many useful articles.

== Notable incidents ==
In 2022, Andy Schwenk of the Spindrift V required medical evacuation from the US Navy on the return trip from Hawaii, due to an infection in his ankle.

== See also ==
- Transpacific Yacht Race
- Victoria to Maui Yacht Race
