= Morning Light (film) =

- Theatrical poster
- Directed by: Mark Monroe
- Story by: Roy E. Disney; Leslie DeMeuse; Thomas J. Pollack
- Produced by: Morgan Sackett
- Cinematography: John Brooks
- Edited by: Paul Crowder
- Music by: Ric Markmann; Dan Pinella; Chris Wagner
- Production company: Walt Disney Pictures
- Distributed by: Walt Disney Studios; Motion Pictures
- Release date: October 8, 2008
- Running time: 98 minutes
- Country: United States
- Language: English
- Box office: $275,776

Morning Light is a 2008 documentary film written and directed by Mark Monroe and executive produced by Roy E. Disney. The film was released on October 8, 2008 by Walt Disney Studios Motion Pictures. The film chronicles a real-life crew training and competing in the 44th Transpacific Yacht Race aboard a TP52 class sailing yacht, Morning Light.

== Plot ==
Morning Light is a documentary that follows the youngest crew (by average age) to compete in the Transpac. All crew members were between 18 and 23 at the time. The film follows the formation of the Morning Light sailing team, their six months of training in advance of the yacht race, and finally the weeklong Los Angeles to Honolulu race itself.

The crew numbered 15 young sailors of varied experience: Chris Branning, Graham Brant-Zawadzki, Chris Clark, Charlie Enright, Jesse Fielding, Robbie Kane, Steve Manson, Chris Schubert, Kate Theisen, Mark Towill (at 18, the youngest crew member), Genny Tulloch, navigator Piet van Os, Chris Welch, Kit Will and the 21-year-old skipper, Jeremy Wilmot.

== Production ==
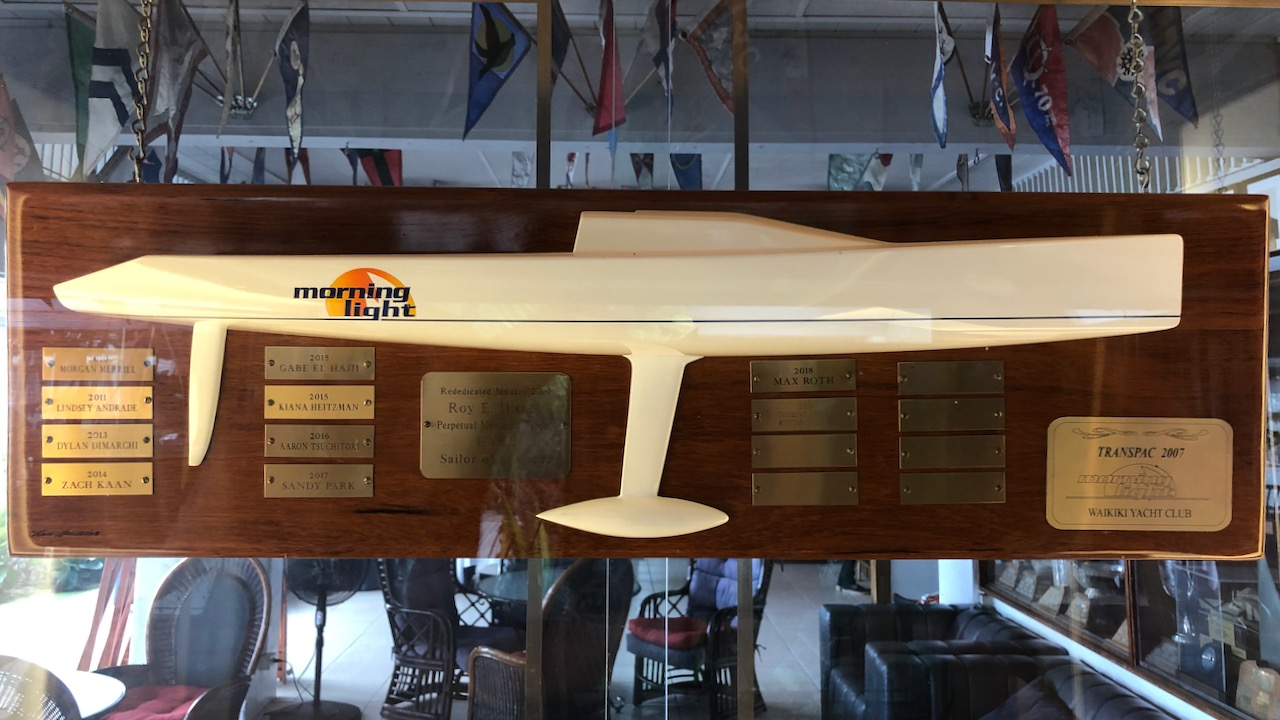
Waikiki Yacht Club honored Disney and the film by using a half-hull of the boat for its HYSA Youth Sailor of the Year trophy

Executive producer Roy Disney was a sailing enthusiast and Transpac competitor who held several sailing speed records including the Los Angeles to Honolulu monohull time record, which he set on his boat Pyewacket in July 1999. The concept for the film came from TP52 Class Association executive director Tom Pollack, who passed it on to former ESPN producer Leslie DeMeuse, who has worked with Disney on other sailing-related film projects.

In early 2006, Roy E. Disney, longtime sailing master Robbie Haines and DeMeuse considered 538 applications and picked 30 finalists, from which 15 were chosen in a week of selection trials in Long Beach, California. Training began in Honolulu, Hawaii in January 2007, for two weeks at a time through late June, with time off in May. The team trained aboard the Morning Light, which Disney purchased from software executive Philippe Kahn. Filming coincided with training and the race itself, which started July 15, 2007 and concluded ten days later.

== Release ==
The film was released on October 17, 2008. Prior to theatrical release, private screenings were held for yacht racing enthusiasts, including one hosted by Roy E. Disney for US Sailing in Newport, Rhode Island, and at the Newport Harbor Nautical Museum in Newport Beach, California to raise money for the Transpacific Yacht Club and their exhibit at the museum.
