= Antarctica Cup Yacht Race =

Yacht race around Antarctica

The Antarctica Cup Yacht Race is a non-stop yacht race which starts and ends in Albany, Western Australia, Australia. During the race which takes around 100 days to complete, sailors circumnavigate the continent of Antarctica at latitudes south of the 40th parallel south.

In 2022, Lisa Blair set a new record for completing the course as a solo and unassisted sailor at 92 days, 18 hours and 21 minutes.

== Concept ==
The Antarctica Cup Yacht Race challenges sailors to circumnavigate Antarctica without stopping. The course distance is between 14,000 and 16,000 nautical miles.

== History ==
The Antarctica Cup was founded by Bob Williams, an ocean racer from Western Australia. He began work on his idea for the race in 2001 but it would take another seven years for the idea to come to fruition. Initially reported to begin in December 2007, Russian sailor Fyodor Konyukhov was announced as the first competitor for the race in April 2007. He would take on the course in his 86ft monohull Trading Network Alye Parusa. The first race began on 26 January 2008 after Konukhov spent two weeks preparing in Australia. He completed the course in just over 102 days.

== Course ==
The course starts and ends at Albany, Western Australia, a historic port 150 nautical miles east of Cape Leeuwin. The port is located on the very edge of the Roaring Forties latitudes, providing a natural starting point to attack the challenging course around the Antarctica continent. The course incorporates 18 "gates" where yachts must check in.

== Record ==
The record for completing the course as a solo and unassisted sailor was set in 2022 by Lisa Blair, at 92 days, 18 hours and 21 minutes.
