= Swiftsure Yacht Race =

Series of long-distance yacht races in Juan de Fuca Strait between Canada and the US

The Swiftsure International Yacht Race is a series of long distance sailing races along the Juan de Fuca Strait between British Columbia in Canada and Washington in the United States. Races start and end in Victoria, BC, Canada. Organized by the Royal Victoria Yacht Club, the annual race occurs with staggered starts on the morning of the last Saturday of May. The race is most popular with sailors from British Columbia and the Pacific Northwest of the USA but it has drawn boats from as far away as California, Hawaii, New Zealand, and Russia.

== Race courses ==
Swiftsure consists of races over four courses (tabulated below) in Juan de Fuca Strait, including the Swiftsure Inshore (formerly "Sookesure" then "Rosedale Rock") and 3 long distance races. All races begin off Clover Point, a spit extending south from Victoria. In the "Classic" long distance race, yachts come about near position 48' 33.00 N, 125' 00.00 W, (48.55 -125.0) off Vancouver Island's Pacific Rim National Park Reserve. The turning point in Canadian waters is traditionally marked by a vessel of the Royal Canadian Navy.

The other two long distance races round a buoy in Clallam Bay and Neah Bay on the north coast of Washington. All four races end at the entrance to Victoria's harbour. They are governed by the Racing Rules of Sailing and the Sail Canada Prescriptions

The unpredictable winds and currents in the Strait test seamanship as well as vessels sea-worthiness. Therefore, it offers wide appeal. In some years, light winds have led to the race being dubbed the "Driftsure." There is a time limit: 8 AM Monday. In some years, such as 1971, 1979, and 2012, strong winds (35 knots or more) have led to boats dropping out or even being dismasted. In 2025, only two boats finished the Swiftsure Lightship Classic course.

Race name	Midpoint marker	Total distance (km)	First year run
Swiftsure Lightship Classic	Swiftsure Bank	256	1930
Juan de Fuca Race	Clallam Bay	146	1962
Cape Flattery Race	Neah Bay	189	1988
Swiftsure Inshore Race	typically Pedder Bay	varies each year	2004
Hein Bank Race (not raced since 2023)	Neah Bay to ODAS buoy 46088	219	2015

== History ==
The first Swiftsure Lightship Classic Race took place in 1930. Six vessels began in Cadboro Bay, raced out the Strait of Juan de Fuca to its mouth, rounded the lightship on Swiftsure Bank, and returned to Victoria. From 1948-1950, the race began in Port Townsend, WA, and ended in Victoria. Beginning in 1951, the current long courses have remained; yachts start in Victoria, race to their rounding mark, finishing back in Victoria.

== See also ==
- Vic-Maui Yacht Race
