= Geographic magazine =

Geographic magazine may refer to:

- Africa Geographic
- Asian Geographic
- Australian Geographic
- Canadian Geographic
- Chinese National Geography
- Géographica
- Geographical (magazine), from the United Kingdom
- Icelandic Geographic
- National Geographic (magazine), from the United States
- New Zealand Geographic

== See also ==
- Arizona Highways
- Journal of the Royal Geographical Society of London, a scholarly geographic journal
