= Roger Chao =

Australian explorer and mountain climber

- Occupations: Explorer, mountain climber, philosopher and ethicist

Roger Chao, FRGS, is an Australian explorer, mountain climber, philosopher and ethicist.

== Mountaineering and exploration ==
In 2006, Chao and Stephen Fordyce completed a mid-winter traverse of the Western Arthurs range in south-west Tasmania. They received the 2006 Young Adventurer of the Year award from the Australian Geographic Society. In 2007, Chao crossed the Greenland ice sheet from east to west without support, becoming the youngest person to do so. He also investigated the effects of global warming on Inuit culture in Greenland, and was elected a Fellow of the Royal Geographical Society in recognition of this research. In 2009 and 2010, Chao and Megan Kerr undertook the "Steppe By Steppe — Side By Side" expedition in Central Asia, traveling on a Quike touring quadracycle from Astana, Kazakhstan through Uzbekistan, Tajikistan, Kyrgyzstan and Xinjiang (an autonomous region in Western China).

Chao is also a whitewater kayaker, caver, rock climber, skier. He has worked as a professional guide and expedition consultant, and as a section rep and delegate for Search and Rescue. Chao serves on the executive committee of The Explorers Club.

== Academic life and views ==
Chao is a 2003 graduate of Scotch College, Melbourne, and has degrees in arts (Politics and Philosophy) and Economics and an Honours degree in Philosophy/Ethics from Monash University.

Chao has worked on a form of average utilitarianism called negative average preference utilitarianism.

== Other ==
Chao has worked at the Office of Environmental Sustainability, and is a Victoria Ambassador for Australia Day.
