= Michael Rothwell (sailor) =

American sailor (1953–2025)

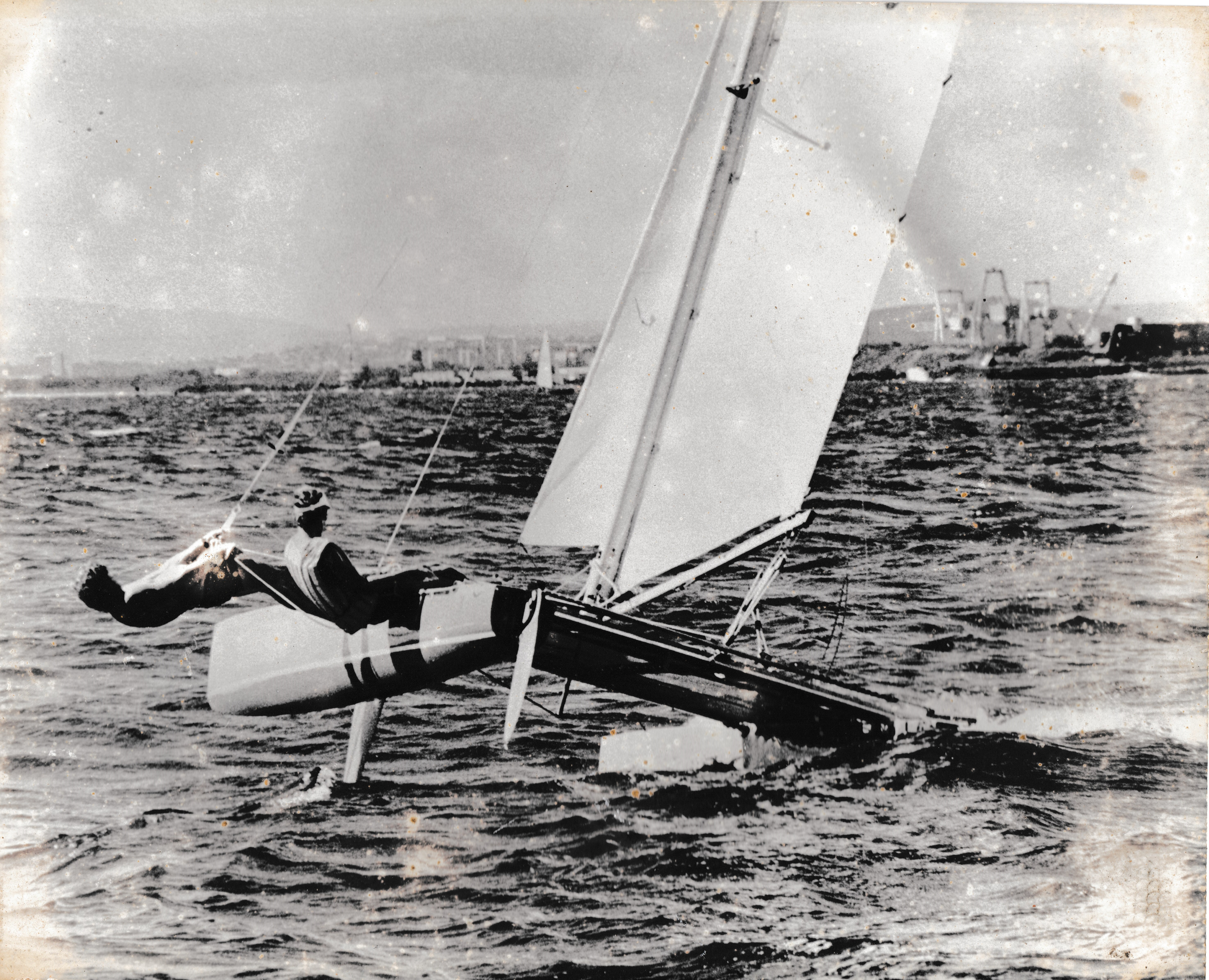
- Rothwell (left) and David McFaull sailing "Zomby Woof"

Personal information
- Born: June 30, 1953 Honolulu, Hawaii, U.S.
- Died: February 9, 2025 (aged 71)
Medal record
Sailing
Representing United States
Olympic Games
Silver medal – second place	1976 Montreal	Tornado

Michael Jon Rothwell (June 30, 1953 – February 9, 2025) was an American sailor. He won a silver medal in the Tornado class with David McFaull at the 1976 Summer Olympics in Montreal, Quebec, Canada.

== Background ==
Mike Rothwell was a fifth-generation kamaʻāina resident of Hawai'i, the great-great-grandson of Captain Robert Brown, a New England whaler who previously served as a helmsman aboard the Charles W. Morgan prior to gaining command of his own ship and eventually settling in Hawaii. His grandfather Guy Nelson Rothwell was a noted architect and charter member of the Waikiki Yacht Club, where Mike first learned to sail.

Both he and sailing partner McFaull became the first Olympic medalists from Hawaii in sailing. His father Frank Rothwell was a contractor who married a Marjorie Blair from Chicago.

Rothwell owned a logistics company in later life, as well as becoming a WYC commodore himself.
