= Australian Sailing (magazine) =

Yacht racing magazine

- Editor: Kimberley Wilmot
- Categories: Sport
- Frequency: Monthly
- Circulation: 4,252
- Publisher: Yaffa Publishing Group
- Founded: 1976 folded 2019
- Country: Australia
- Based in: Surry Hills
- Language: English

Australian Sailing magazine (ASL) was published by Yaffa Publishing Group, an independent publisher headquartered in Surry Hills (NSW). Founded in 1976, it was Australia's only dedicated yacht racing magazine.

== Overview ==
The readership included owners and crew of the 100 ft maxis, keelboat racers, dinghy and sailboard racers.

== History ==
Australian Sailing was founded by Bob Ross and Ken McLachlan in September 1976. Ross came from a newspaper background and entered boating journalism via Modern Boating magazine. McLachlan was an advertising salesman.

A New Zealander by birth, Ross spent his early years in the Finn dinghy, in which he competed for Olympic selection in 1964 and 1968. He also raced competitively in J24s and offshore events including the Sydney-Hobart, winning the 1986 Sydney-Mooloolaba race as co-helmsman aboard Nuzulu.

In 1996 he won the Robert Greaves Achievement Award which recognises outstanding contributions to the boating industry. He wasn't able to attend the award ceremony because he was covering yachting at the Olympic Games at the time. He has covered every major world yachting event, including every America's Cup since 1962, Admirals Cups and Olympic sailing.

In 1986 Ross and McLachlan sold the magazine to Yaffa Publishing, a privately held company which publishes business-to-business and specialist consumer magazines from its Surry Hills (NSW) base.

Ross remained editor of Sailing until December 2003, when he handed over to Vanessa Dudley. One of the first women to compete against the men in 18 ft skiffs, as skipper of Nutrimetics, Dudley also had credentials in dinghy and offshore racing. She has completed 15 Sydney to Hobart races. Dudley was editor of Australian Sailing until June 2009.

In 2009, due to the 2008 financial crisis, the frequency was reduced from monthly to eight issues a year. During the winter months the publication came out every second month.

Roger McMillan was editor from July 2009 until November 2013. McMillan began his journalism career and his interest in sailing in New Zealand, where he cruised a small Spencer-designed keelboat offshore from Auckland. Moving to Australia in 1986 he built a 37 ft Van de Stadt and sailed it short-handed and solo from Western Australia to Sydney via Cape Leeuwin, the Great Australian Bight and the Bass Strait.

In November 2013 Roger McMillan was replaced by Kimberley Wilmot as editor of the magazine and the frequency of the magazine reduced to six issues per year.

== Notable Contributors ==
David Dellenbaugh was tactician aboard the 1992 America's Cup winning boat America Cubed and publishes a bi-monthly newsletter specialising in yacht racing tactics.

Tony Bull is a sailmaker and offshore racing consultant who provides a monthly column on faster sailing.

Andrew Verdon is the strength and conditioning coach for the Australian Sailing Team. His column offers advice on preparation for race days.

Will Oxley is a racing navigator who has completed more than 200,000 nm of ocean miles including three round the world races and 11 Sydney to Hobart races. Most recently he provided navigation and weather support for Puma in the 2008–09 Volvo Ocean Race.

Bob Ross is the founding editor of Australian Sailing and contributed a monthly article on a variety of subjects from practical issues such as hull preparation and sailcloth to profiles of sailors.

Vanessa Dudley is also a former editor of the magazine and is a World Masters Laser Radial Gold Medallist. She has helmed 18 ft skiffs, completed 15 Sydney to Hobart races and written about all major yacht races including the Olympic Games. Dudley contributes a monthly Masterclass, concentrating on preparation and racing in off-the-beach classes.
