= Lisa Blair =

Australian female solo sailor

Lisa Blair OAM
- Occupations: Solo sailor, author, climate activist, key note speaker
- Known for: Sailing solo around Antarctica
- Website: https://lisablairsailstheworld.com/

Lisa Blair is an Australian solo sailor who holds multiple world sailing records. She is also an advocate for action against climate change, which she promotes through her Climate Action Now project. She has written a book, Facing Fear, about her first attempt at circumnavigating Antarctica solo on her yacht Climate Action Now. Blair received an Order of Australia Medal (OAM) in the Australia Day Honours List in January 2025 'for services to sailing'.

== Solo sailing career ==
Blair was 25 years old when she got a job as a hostess on a boat in the Whitsundays. She completed her first ocean passage as a crew member delivering a yacht to Hawaii in 2008. In 2011 she crewed in the Clipper Round the World Yacht Race as a watch leader, bowman, rigger and helmsman. Her team on the yacht Gold Coast Australia won the overall Clipper Race trophy for the 2011–12 edition of the race. Blair's solo sailing career started in 2014 when she sailed the Solo Tasman Challenge from New Zealand to Queensland, borrowing a yacht one week before the race. She then spent three and a half years planning and fundraising for her first attempt at circumnavigating Antarctica. She purchased her own boat Climate Action Now in 2015, originally named Funnel-Web, which she sailed in the 2015 Rolex Sydney to Hobart Yacht Race. Climate Action Now is a 2003 Hick 50, 15.25m (50ft) monohull designed by Robert Hick.

=== Solo circumnavigations of Antartica (2017 & 2022) ===
In 2017, Blair attempted to circumnavigate Antarctica solo for the first time, with the goal of becoming the first woman to sail solo, non-stop and unassisted around Antarctica and the secondary goal of breaking the current record of 102 days held by Russia. 72 days into this attempt she experienced a knockdown causing her yacht to dismast, about 1,000 nautical miles from land. She built a jury rig and diverted to Cape Town where she spent two months repairing her yacht, before recommencing her voyage to circumnavigate Antarctica and became the first female solo sailor to circumnavigate Antarctica with one stop. The whole trip, including the stop in Cape Town, took 183 days 7 hours and 21 minutes.

In 2022, Blair began another attempt to circumnavigate Antarctica, beating Fyodor Konyukhov's 2008 record by 10 days. As of 2022, she holds the record of being the fastest person to sail solo, non-stop and unassisted around Antarctica, taking a record of 92 days, 18 hours and 21 minutes to complete.

=== Solo circumnavigation of Australia record (2018) ===
On 17 December 2018, in between her two Antartica records, Lisa established two new world records; she became the first woman to sail solo, non-stop, and unassisted around Australia, and a new speed record as the fastest mono-hulled yacht to sail solo, non-stop and unassisted around Australia, doing so in 58 days 2 hours and 25 minutes. She covered a total of 6,536 nautical miles, sailing anti-clockwise around Australia, including Tasmania, at an average speed of 4.69 knots.

=== Solo Sydney to Auckland record (2024) ===
On the 9th April 2024 Blair, on her boat Climate Action Now, broke two new world records; becoming the first female, and the fastest person to sail a monohull solo, non-stop and unassisted from Sydney to Auckland with a time of 8 days, 3 hours and 19 minutes (to be ratified by the World Sailing Speed Record Council (WSSRC). The original speed record was established on 22 January 2020, by retired Australian Veteran James Prascevic set the solo, monohull record with a time of 12d 14h 41m 15s, who was sailing to raise awareness of post-traumatic stress disorder (PTSD). This record was part of her The “Cross the Ditch for Climate Action Now” campaign, aimed at raising awareness of ocean pollution issues and advocating for everyone to make a change for the health of the ocean.

=== Solo circumnavigation of New Zealand (2024) ===
On the 24th May 2024, Blair established a new sailing record; sailing unassisted, solo and on a monohull anticlockwise around New Zealand from Auckland to Auckland, a total distance of 2,672nm. The circumnavigation, which required her course to include all rocks and islands laying within 8nm of the mainland, took Blair 16 days and 23 hours (to be ratified by WSSRC).

== Climate activist ==
During Blair's second circumnavigation of Antarctica, her yacht Climate Action Now was equipped with several scientific devices such as an Ocean Pack Race Research Unit, which measures carbon dioxide (CO²), salinity levels, temperature and barometric pressure. She also collected samples to be used to study the level of microplastics in the water, and has been working in partnership with the Australian Institute of Marine Science (AIMS) and Integrated Marine Observing System (IMOS) to study those samples.

Blair's project, Climate Action Now, encourages individuals to think about how they can contribute towards a better future for our planet. The hull of her yacht of the same name, Climate Action Now, is designed from post-it notes that reflect actual messages from supporters and fans about what they are doing to be more sustainable.

Blair is part of a consortium investigating basalt fibre-reinforced bioresins "as a scalable solution to outperform fibreglass and provide a circular solution to the growing industry problem" of waste from end-of-life fibreglass boats. The two-year, $1.9 million research partnership was announced in April 2026 and aims to develop composite materials that will be used in an upcoming record attempt, planned for July 2027 and titled The Arctic Impact Project.

The Sustainable Composites for Next Gen Boat Hulls project will produce "detailed Life Cycle Assessment and environmental impact modelling". It also involves boatbuilder Steber International and University of NSW researchers, and is backed by funding from the Australian Composites Manufacturing Cooperative Research Centre.

== Other projects ==
=== Media ===
Blair is the author of the book Facing Fear, published in 2021 by Australian Geographic, which details the story of her first attempt at sailing solo around Antarctica.

Blair was a contestant on the first season of Million Dollar Island, which aired in 2023 on Channel Seven in Australia, hosted by Ant Middleton.

The documentary Ice Maiden (2024), directed by Nathaniel C. T. Jackson, is about her first solo sail around Antarctica. It has been included in a number of international film festivals including the 2024 Ocean Film Festival World Tour, touring Australia and New Zealand, 2024 Doc Edge in New Zealand and the Warsaw International Film Festival 2024 in Poland.

=== Key note speaking ===
Lisa is a motivational speaker on topics in female empowerment, resilience and mental agility.

== Awards ==
- 2017: Spirit of Adventure Award – Australian Geographic
- 2017: Seamanship Award – Ocean Cruising Club
- 2022: Adventurer of the Year Award – Australian Geographic
- 2022: Offshore Sailor of the Year – Australian Sailing
- 2025: Order of Australia Medal (OAM) 'for services to sailing'
- 2025: International Honorary Member, Zonta International Zonta International

== Records ==
- As of 2017, the first woman to sail solo, unassisted around Antarctica with one stop, with a time of 183 days, 7 hours, and 21 minutes.
- As of 2018, the fastest person to sail solo, non-stop and unassisted around Australia with a time of 58 days, 2 hours, and 25 minutes.
- In 2019, Lisa and co-skipper Jackie Parry became the first double-handed female team to finish the Melbourne to Hobart Yacht Race.
- As of 2022, the fastest person to sail solo, non-stop and unassisted around Antarctica with a time of 92 days, 18 hours, and 21 minutes.
- As of April 2024, the first women, and fastest person to sail solo, non-stop and unassisted from Sydney to Auckland with a time of 8 days, 3 hours and 19 minutes.
- In May 2024, Blair became the first person to sail solo, non-stop and unassisted around New Zealand; Auckland to Auckland with a time of 16 days and 23 hours.

== Filmography ==
| Year | Title | Role | Notes | Ref. |
|---|---|---|---|---|
| 2023 | Million Dollar Island | Herself (Contestant) | TV show | |
| 2024 | Ice Maiden | Herself | Documentary | |
| 2024 | Ice Maiden (Tour Edit) | Herself | One of 7 films part of the Ocean Film Festival World Tour Aus/NZ | |
