= Waikiki Yacht Club =

Private yacht club in Honolulu, Hawaii

Coordinates: 21°17′17.6″N 157°50′30.3″W

- Burgee
- Short name: WYC
- Founded: 1944
- Location: 1599 Ala Moana Blvd; Honolulu, HI 96814
- Website: www.waikikiyachtclub.com

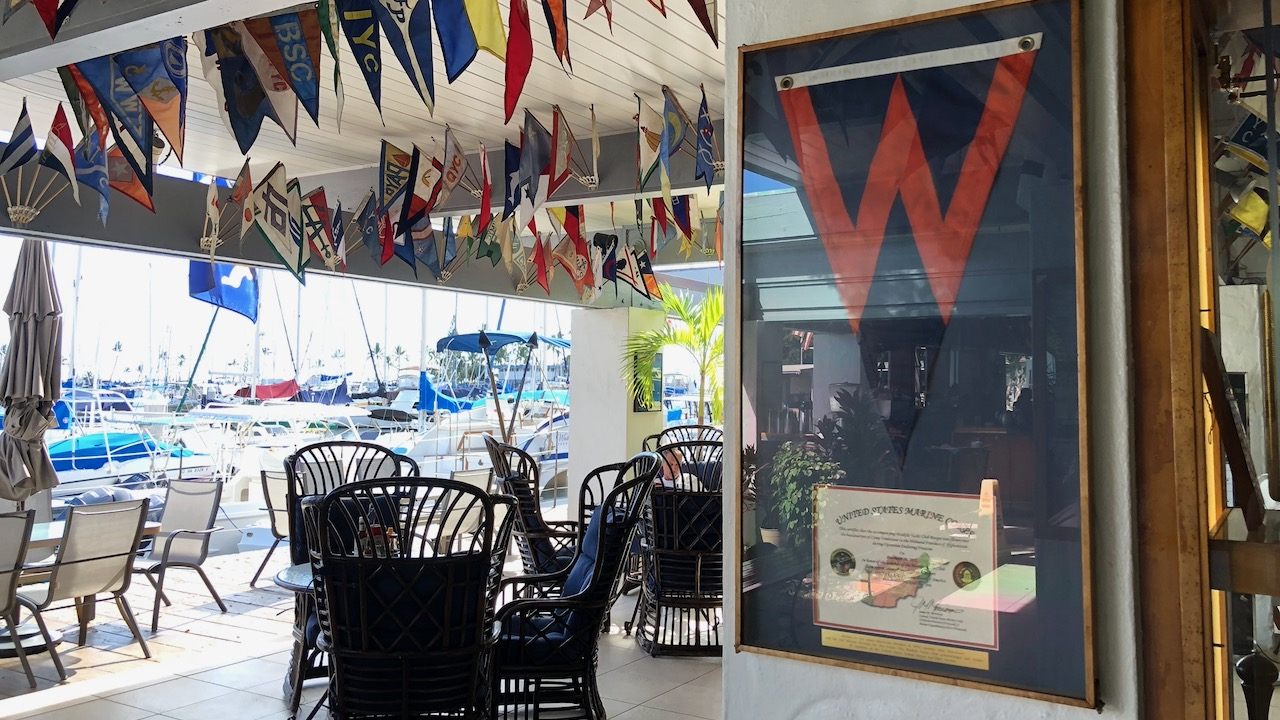
A WYC Burgee flown in Afghanistan overlooks the club's waterfront lanai

Waikiki Yacht Club (WYC) is a yacht club operating year-round in Honolulu, Hawaii. The club is a significant promoter of sail racing and transpacific expeditions, sponsoring numerous teams and events in youth and adult regattas, paddling races, and fishing tournaments. They are a member of the Hawaii Yacht Racing Association and has served as a host of the Transpacific Yacht Race since its first post-war race in 1947.

Their clubhouse in Honolulu's Ala Wai Harbor features a waterfront restaurant and bar, pool, gym, and a private marina for member's boats.

== History ==
The Waikiki Yacht Club was founded in 1944 by members of the then closed Pearl Harbor Yacht Club (PHYC) due to restrictions placed on civilian access to Pearl Harbor. As World War II drew to an end, it soon became clear that the U.S. Navy would not open Pearl Harbor to recreational boating again, and members petitioned the state to allow them use of a shack formerly occupied by the Army at Ala Moana Beach Park, adjacent to the newly built Ala Wai Harbor to start a new club.

Former PHYC member George Over served as the club's first commodore with Duke Kahanamoku and other community leaders serving on the board of directors. Dr. Pete Wilson became the first dues paying member, paying a $25.00 US dollar ($457.20 in 2025) initiation fee. The club sponsored 4 races in 1944, and a full season with more than a dozen races in 1945.

The club formally signed a 40 year lease on the property with the state in 1953, and commissioned member and noted local architect Guy Rothwell to build the original modern Hawiian clubhouse still in use today. The pool was added in 1958, and the footprint doubled in 1967 by architect Tom Wells, who expanded the club's facilities with the current bar, updated kitchen, and increased restaurant capacity.

WYC launched one of Hawaii's first junior sailing programs in 1947, training future members such as David McFaull and Michael Rothwell, who went on to win silver in sailing at the 1976 Summer Olympics. The club is also a part of America's Cup history through its sponsorship of member John Kolius' 2000 Louis Vuitton Cup challenge.

The club remains active today, regularly hosting a number of cup and amateur races throughout the year together with their HYRA partners, as well as numerous shoreside programs at the clubhouse for its members. As befitting the island of Oahu's English translation as "the gathering place", WYC has welcomed visiting sailors from around the globe since hosting the first post-war Transpac race in 1947.

== Regattas and trophies ==
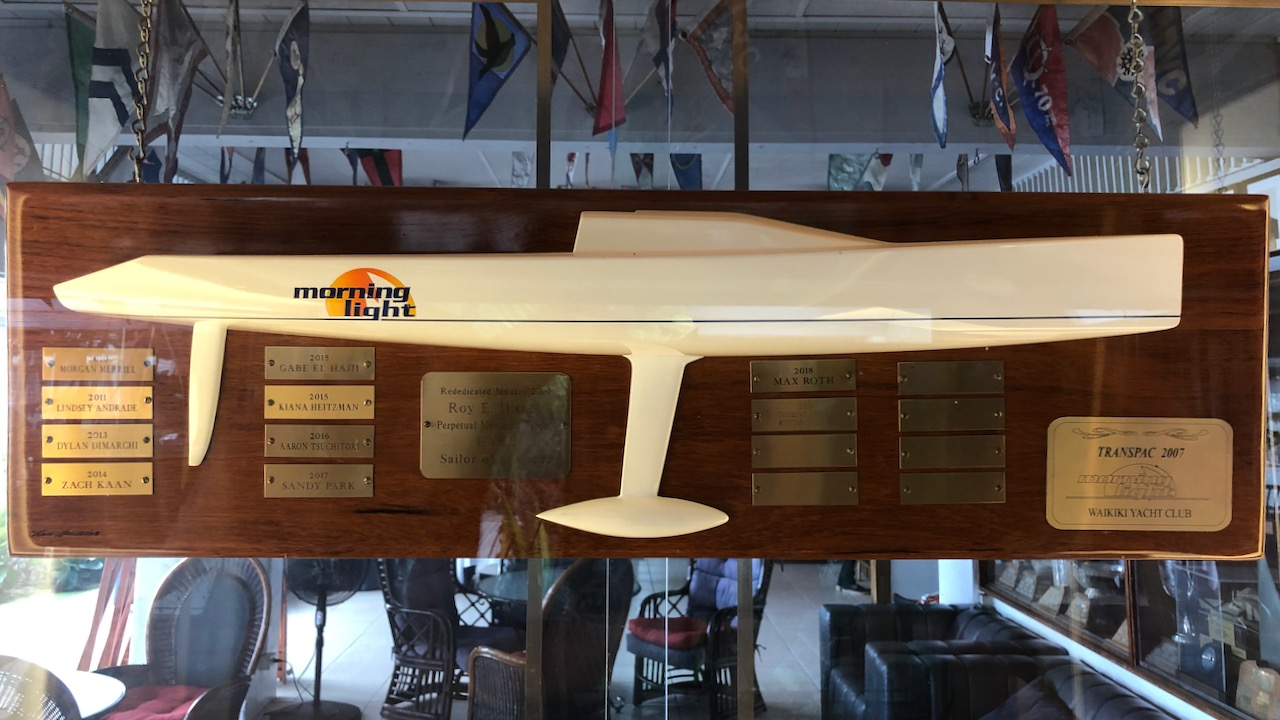
The Roy E. Disney HYSA Youth Sailor of the Year perpetual trophy at WYC

WYC has sponsored and hosted numerous teams and regattas over the years, and displays many of their perpetual trophies in its clubhouse.

Some of the awards featured include McFaull and Rothwell's Olympic medals, the US Sailing Sportsmanship Award, a Volvo Ocean Race fastest 24 hour run trophy, the King Kamehameha Waikiki Offshore race trophy, the Curtis Pi’ehu Iaukea Transpac First Foreign Corrected Time trophy, the Transpac Barn Door trophy, Hawaii's Lipton Cup, the Roy E. Disney HYSA Youth Sailor of the Year, and the King Kalākaua HYRA cup.
