= Linda Beilharz =

Australian adventurer

Linda Beilharz OAM
- Born: 15 April 1960 (age 66)
- Education: Community Development and Master of Health Science, 1981
- Alma mater: La Trobe University

Linda Beilharz is an Australian adventurer who is the first Australian woman to successfully trek the South and North poles. She completed the North Pole expedition with her husband Rob Rigato and Canadian explorer Sarah McNair-Landry in April 2010. while the South Pole trek was completed in December 2004, she became the first Australian woman to ski 1,100 km from the edge of the Antarctic to the South Pole. Beilharz and Rigato have also completed a 35-day crossing across the Greenland Icecap in April 2007, and the South Patagonia icecap in 2012, after an earlier unsuccessful attempt in 2009. New Zealander, Kerryn Wratt was the third member of the successful 2012 crossing.

Beilharz lives in Bendigo, Victoria, Australia where she is the Executive Officer of Women's Health Loddon Mallee. She graduated from La Trobe University in 1993 with a Graduate Diploma in Community Development and Masters in Health Sciences in 1999. She was awarded the 2010 Australian Geographic Adventurer of the Year for her South Pole expedition, was inducted into the Victorian Honour Roll of Women in 2006, elected Bendigo Citizen of the Year in 2013 and in the same year awarded an Order of Australia Medal.

She is heavily involved in community work as a member of the Bendigo Sustainability Group, Bush Search and Rescue, and was a past Director of Community Capacity Building with St Luke's Anglicare for 10 years. She has created learning resources under the title "Journeys for Learning" which supports teachers with information, stories and lesson guides, linking schools to modern day adventures. Beilharz is also a private pilot and instructor for Bendigo flying club.

== Publications ==
- Building Communities: The Shared Active Experience.
