= Ticonderoga (ketch) =

History

United States
- Name: Tiago II
- Owner: Scott Frantz
- Builder: Quincy Adams Yacht Yard
- Cost: $49,000
- Launched: 10 August 1936, Quincy, Massachusetts
- Renamed: Ticonderoga

General characteristics
- Class & type: clipper-bowed ketch
- Displacement: 119,016 lb
- Length: 72 ft (21.9 m)
- Beam: 16 ft (4.87 m)
- Draft: 7 ft 10 in (2.16 m)
- Propulsion: Sail and Engine (GMC 130hp)

Ticonderoga, also called Ti or Big Ti, is a 72-foot (21.9 m) ketch, designed by L. Francis Herreshoff and launched in 1936 at Quincy Adams Yacht Yard in Massachusetts. She was known under the name of Tioga II until 1946.

As a ketch, Ticonderoga features two masts: a taller main mast towards the bow and a shorter mizzen mast towards the stern. This sail configuration allows for versatility and improved handling in different wind conditions.

Ticonderoga gained recognition for its elegance, speed, and excellent sailing capabilities. Her design was highly regarded, and the yacht became a classic example of Herreshoff's work. The vessel's sleek lines, balanced proportions, and efficient hull design contributed to its reputation as a fine sailing craft.

Over the years, Ticonderoga has participated in various sailing races and regattas, often achieving notable success. It has competed in prestigious events such as the Newport Bermuda Race and the Antigua Classic Yacht Regatta.

Ticonderoga is also known for its durability and longevity. The vessel has undergone several restorations and refits to maintain its original beauty and performance. It has been well-preserved and continues to be admired as a piece of maritime history.

== History ==
Ticonderoga won many races, finishing first in 24 of her initial 36 races. She held more than 30 course records in multiple races.

=== Races and Trophies ===
- As Tioga, the Miami-Nassau Cup Race in 1940, for many years she held the fastest time in this race
- The Prince of Wales Bowl in 1947, first-to-finish, Class A, and over all trophy
- Marblehead-Halifax Race in 1947
- First-to-finish in the annual St. Petersburg-Habana yacht race in 1951, 1952, and 1954
- Transpac Honolulu Race Elapsed Time Record Trophy in 1965, setting the record that stood for ten years
- 1965 Montego Bay Race.

During World War II she served as a U.S. Coast Guard vessel on submarine patrol. After the war she was bought by Allan Carliste and rechristened Ticonderoga.

Her racing career ended in 1967 when her hull was rebuilt and she was turned into a luxury charter in 1969.

Radiance is Ti's sistership.

== See also ==
- List of sailing boat types
