= Australian Geographic =

Australian bi-monthly magazine

- Editor: Karen McGhee
- Frequency: Bimonthly
- Founder: Dick Smith
- Founded: 1986
- Company: National Geographic (owned by the RACAT Group)
- Country: Australia
- Website: australiangeographic.com.au

Australian Geographic is a bi-monthly geographical journal that focuses mainly on stories about Australia, or about Australian people in other countries. It was founded in 1986 by Dick Smith, and originally titled Dick Smith's Australian Geographic.

Australian Geographic is a media business that produces the magazine and website, and operates, either itself or business partners, Australian Geographic stores, Australian Geographic Travel, and various other businesses. It is owned by the RACAT Group. The profits earned by Australian Geographic Holdings are contributed to the Australian Geographic Society, which is a registered Australian charity. The Australian Geographic Society Awards, comprising seven categories, are awarded annually.

== History ==
The Australian Geographic magazine, originally titled Dick Smith's Australian Geographic, was initially published by Australian Geographic Pty Ltd, a private company controlled by Dick Smith, the founder of Dick Smith Electronics and Dick Smith Foods. His name was removed from the title two years later. Australian Geographic Pty Ltd also operated the Australian Geographic chain of retail stores. The publication's offices were originally based in Terrey Hills north of Sydney. Smith wanted the publication to focus on accuracy by exclusively including articles that were peer-reviewed. Australian Geographic acquired rights to the Australian Encyclopaedia and published editions in 1988 and 1996. In 1995, when subscriptions totalled more than 200,000, Smith sold the business to Fairfax Media for A$41 million.

In December 1998, the business was bought out by its management.

From September 2000 to December 2001, Australian Geographic published a bimonthly science and technology magazine known as Newton Graphic Science. There were, however, only eight issues published before the magazine went permanently out of print.

In November 2006, PBL Media's ACP Magazines (now Bauer Media Group) purchased the Australian Geographic publishing division. The Australian Geographic magazine was then based at Park Street, Sydney. The editor-in-chief of Australian Geographic was Chrissie Goldrick, while the editor was John Pickrell.

In September 2007, Australian Geographic Retail, which operates an online store and retail stores selling products including Australiana, weather stations, telescopes, books and toys, was sold separately to the publication business. From 2007 to 2016 Australian Geographic Retail was owned by Myer Family Investments but after large operating losses it was sold in August 2016 to The Co-op, a retail supplier to universities. The license ended in 2019.

In March 2018, Northern Pictures, which was then owned by Blue Ant Media, acquired the magazine from Bauer Media Group. The whole editorial and production team remained in place, including editor-in-chief Chrissie Goldrick.

Blue Ant Media acquired RACAT's operating businesses in 2017. In 2020, RACAT reacquired Northern Pictures, Runaway Play, and Australian Geographic.

== Description ==
=== Governance ===
As of November 2026, Australian Geographic is part of the RACAT Group, along with Northern Pictures, game developer Runaway, and Junkee Media. David Haslingden is managing director of the RACAT Group. Australian Geographic is a media business that produces the Australian Geographic magazine and website, australiangeographic.com.au and operates, either itself or business partners, Australian Geographic stores, Australian Geographic Travel, and various other businesses.

=== Magazine ===
Australian Geographic is a bi-monthly geographical journal that focuses mainly on stories about Australia, or about Australian people in other countries. The six editions published each year are available by subscription and on newsstands. They include posters or sheet maps in each edition, as well as photographs and detailed technical illustrations. The entire Australian Geographic magazine archive is available on its website to subscribers.

=== Society ===
The profits earned by Australian Geographic Holdings are contributed to the Australian Geographic Society, which is a registered Australian charity.

== Australian Geographic Society Awards ==
The Australian Geographic Society Adventure Award has been awarded since 1987 and is Australia's longest-running award for adventure. It is judged on merit and therefore not all of the categories are awarded annually. The award ceremony, attended in 2018 by the Duke and Duchess of Sussex, is a celebration of achievement and is not a competition. The award is given in five categories – Lifetime of Adventure, Lifetime of Conservation, Adventurer of the Year, Conservationist of the Year, Spirit of Adventure, Young Adventurer of the Year and Young Conservationist of the Year.

=== Lifetime of Adventure ===
Year	Awardee	Achievements
2024	Lucy Barnard	Lucy is determined to be the first woman to walk the length of the Americas, from Ushuaia in Argentina to Utqiagvik in Alaska. Lucy's journey started in 2017 and in March 2023 she became the first woman to walk the length of South America. That is 11,100 km across five countries. Lucy is not alone on her quest as Wombat, her loyal Australian cattle dog, is right beside her. Together they are known as ‘Tangles and Tail’ on social media. Wombat's enthusiastic character provides friendship, and security and helps Lucy connect with people she meets along the way. Wombat's undying dedication is also deservedly recognised in an inaugural ‘Canine Adventurer of the Year’ award by the Australian Geographic Society. By the time the pair complete the journey, they will have walked 30,000 km through 15 countries. Up to now, the intrepid pair have navigated through Central America and Mexico, passed the halfway mark of the walk and reached the United States of America.
2023	Glenn Singleman & Heather Swan	2x recipients of the AGS spirit of adventure medal. In 2006 Glenn and Heather claimed the record for the world's highest wingsuit BASE jump, from a 6604m ledge on Mt. Meru in the Garhwal Himalaya in India (see Born to Fly, AG 84). They spent 22 days climbing steep blue ice to reach the summit. In 2009 Australia's highest balloon flight (37,838 ft), the highest skydive in Australia, and the highest wingsuit exit in the world (36,750 ft). In 2011 and 2015, they made the first (and only) wingsuit flights across Sydney Harbour and Brisbane respectively, and in 2018, Heather became the first woman to fly wingsuit over Antarctica. In April 2015 Glenn and Heather completed the first wingsuit crossing of the Grand Canyon, passing over the deepest part of the canyon – from the North Rim to the South Rim – at 160 km/h.
2022	Dr Geoff Wilson	Dr Geoff Wilson holds 6 world records throughout his lifetime of extreme weather expeditions. He holds records for: the only wind-assisted crossing of the sahara desert (2009), the fastest solo, unsupported, crossing of Antarctica (2013–14), the fastest unsupported south–north crossing of Greenland (2017), the first crossing of the Torres Strait by kiteboard (2012) and completing the longest solo, unsupported, polar journey ever (2019–20). To break this record Dr Wilson travelled with a kite-ski from Thor's Hammer to the Lenin bust at the Pole of Inaccessibility, a distance of 5600 km, and back again.
2019	Mal Leyland	During the 1970s Mal and his brother rose to fame through their televised adventures across Australia, most notably the series Ask the Leyland Brothers. They went in search of lost monuments, rumoured migratory birds and ephemeral lakes. The brothers were responsible for inspiring a generation of Australians to explore their own country.
2018	Syd Kirkby	Syd has surveyed more of the Australian Antarctic Territory than any other explorer. His crew was the first to view the world's largest glacier, Lambert Glacier and explore the Prince Charles Mountains.
2017	Jon Muir OAM	Jon made the first unsupported ascent of Everest in 1988, trekked the North Pole in 2000 and traversed 6000 km across oceans by sea kayak, making him one of the most experienced adventurers in Australian history. He holds the record for the first solo traverse on foot of Australia's largest salt lakes. In 2001 he became the first person to walk, unsupported, across Australia from Port Augusta to Burketown, across 2,500 km over 128 days. In 2007 he trekked 1,700 km, unassisted, from the Spencer Gulf SA to the Geographic Centre of Australia.
2016	Ron Allum	Ron pioneered the engineering of the Deepsea Challenger, a submarine that streamed live footage from challengers deep (the lowest point in the Mariana Trench. He developed a groundbreaking foam for the chassis of the sub.
2015	Eric Philips OAM	Philips is the only person to have skied across Earth's four largest icecaps - Antarctica to the South Pole, Greenland, the South Patagonian Icecap and Ellesmere Island. His 84-day journey to the South Pole pioneered a new route through the Transantarctic Mountains. He was part of the first Australian team to reach the North Pole unsupported, and to ski both the North and South poles.
2014	Hans Tholstrup	Tholstrup co-created the world solar challenge, which he ran for 15 years, which has solar powered cars drive from Perth to Sydney (4,130 km). Hans has more than a dozen other impressive walking, driving, flying and sailing ‘firsts’ - including being the first to sail around Australia in an open boat, 1970, and being the first to jump 14 motorcycles in a double-decker bus with AG founder Dick Smith in 1980.

=== Lifetime of Conservation ===
Year	Awardee	Achievements
2023	Brigitte Stevens	Since 2006, after founding the Wombat Awareness Organisation, Brigitte has rescued and rehabilitated 10,000 wombats, and lobbied for stronger legislative protections for wombats. Her sanctuary for injured, orphaned and misplaced wombats is the largest of its kind in the world.
2022	John Wamsley	John Wamsley was far beyond his time in his approach to wildlife conservation. He created the Warrawong Wildlife Sanctuary where he successfully bred Platypus in captivity, which had been extinct since the 1970s.
2019	John Rumney	John founded Undersea Explorer, offering free berths to reef researchers, thereby facilitating vital access to remote places across the GBR. He also established Eye to Eye Marine encounters research and tourism operation, facilitating primary reef research through tourism partnerships.
2018	Atticus Fleming	As the Chief Executive of the Australian Wildlife Conservancy from 2002 to 2018, Fleming oversaw its growth from a small WA operation to the largest private owner of land for conservation in the world, managing 4.56 million hectares. Atticus developed a new model for conservation, thereby protecting some of the largest remaining populations of many of Australia's threatened species, including bilbies, numbat, bridled nailtail wallabies, gouldian finches, purple-crowned fairy-wrens.
2017	Curt & Mich Jenner	Curt and Mich head the Centre for Whale Research in WA and, between them, have studied everything about whales, from population biology and migratory pathways to the ecology and behaviours of whales. They identified Perth Canyon as one of only two high-density feeding sites for endangered pygmy blue whales in Australian waters. They found a humpback breeding haven in Camden Sound, off the Kimberley.
2016	Robyn Williams	Williams had a career spanning 4 decades, over 2,000 broadcasts, 14,000 stories and 7,000 interviews with experts. Williams ran the Science Show and Ockham's Razor, as well as conducting many interviews on ABC.
2015	Robert Purves AM	Purves established the Purves Environmental Fund. The organisation donates $2 million annually for environmental sustainability and biodiversity. Robert is the president of WWF Australia, director of the Climate Council of Australia amongst a myriad of other key roles in sustainability.
2014	Tim Flannery	Tim has communicated the science of human-induced climate change to the Australian Population, as possibly Australia's most outspoken climate advocate. He is a professor at Macquarie University and chief councillor at the Climate Council.

=== Adventurer of the Year ===
Year	Awardee	Achievement
2023	Richard Barnes	Solo Kayak across the Tasman sea, 1676 km, unassisted, non-stop. Australia to New Zealand.
2022	Lisa Blair	Holds the record for the fastest solo & unassisted circumnavigation of Antarctica in 2022, taking 92 days, 18 hrs and 21 mins, 10 days faster than the previous record. In 2017 she claimed the record for becoming the first woman to sail solo, unassisted, non-stop, around Australia.
2019	Michelle Lee	The first Australian Woman to row solo across the Atlantic Ocean, finishing in 68 days and having lost 14 kg in weight.
2018	Steve Plain	Climbed the world's seven continent summits – Vernon, Aconcagua, Kilimanjaro, Carstensz, Elbrus, Denali and Everest – in just four months following a near-fatal injury he suffered in 2014.
2017	Sandy Robson	Travelled 22,000 km through 20 countries, solo by kayak from Germany to Australia. She is the first person to circumnavigate Sri Lanka by sea kayak, the first woman to paddle the coasts of India, Bangladesh and Papua New Guinea by sea kayak and the first women to paddle from Sri Lanka to India across the Palk Strait.
2016	Michael Smith	The first person to solo circumnavigate the world in a single-engine flying boat. He had initially intended to fly to London, but upon his arrival he decided to continue flying across the North Atlantic, North America and the North Pacific.
2015	John Jacoby, Chris Porter, Andrew Maffett and Jim Bucirde	The 4 man team circumnavigated the subantarctic island of South Georgia across 500 km in kayaks in such speed that they then traversed the island. Thereby they became the first team to have completed a crossing and circumnavigation of the island.
2014	Jason Beachcroft	The first person to kayak around Australia, incorporating Tasmania into the route, across 17 months and 18,000 km.
2013	Tim Jarvis	Leading the re-enactment expedition of Shackleton's epic 1916 journey.
2012	Pat Farmer	Marathon running from the North to the South poles.
2010	Linda Beilharz	First Australian woman to walk to the North and South poles.
2009	Andrew Lock	Mountaineer who successfully climbed all fourteen of the tallest +8000m peaks in the world.
2008	Jozef Truban	Trekked 3100 km across the Carpathian Mountains in 2007.
2007	Lloyd Godson	Survived in a self-contained underwater habitat "the BioSUB" for 12 days.
2006	Tim Cope	Travelled by horse from Mongolia to Hungary on the trail of nomads during 2004–2007.
2005	Andrew McAuley	Paddled across the Gulf of Carpentaria in 2004 in a kayak.
2004	Jon Johanson	First solo flight over the South Pole in a single-engine home-built aircraft.
2003	Sue Fear	First Australian-born woman to climb Mount Everest.
2002	Jon Muir	First ever unassisted crossing of Australia in 128 days, from Port Augusta to Burketown. Muir has also summitted Mount Everest in 1988, and has walked to both the south (1999) and north (2002) poles.
2001	Tammy van Wisse	First person to swim the entire length of the Murray River in Australia.
2000	Dick Smith	Flew a balloon across the Tasman Sea from New Zealand to Australia.
1999	David Mason	Walked solo across Australia from Byron Bay to Steep Point in 1998.
1998	David Lewis	Completed the world's first circumnavigation of the planet in multi-hull vessel.
1997	Syd Kirkby	First man to venture into the Prince Charles Mountains in Antarctica with sled dogs during 1956–57.
1996	Don & Margie McIntyre	Married couple who spent a year living in a tent in Antarctica.
1995	Denis Bartell	Walked across Australia in 1984, and became the first person to walk solo across the width of the Simpson Desert.
1994	Len Beadell	Completed the Woomera town survey, and supervised the construction of +6500 km of roads in outback Australia.
1993	Warwick Deacock	Organised the first Australian climbing expedition of Annapurna III in the Himalayas during 1980.
1992	Ron and Valerie Taylor	Became the first people to film Great White Sharks underwater in 1992 without the protection of a cage.
1991	Warren Bonython	Walked across the Simpson Desert in 1973, and largely contributed to the formation of the Heysen Trail.
1990	Hans Tholstrup	First maritime circumnavigation of Australia in an open boat, and first to cross Australia in a solar powered car.
1989	Dot Butler	Conservationist, mountaineer, explorer, and long-distance cyclist.
1988	Philip Law	Scientist and Antarctic explorer.
1987	Colin Putt	Antarctic explorer and mountaineer. Amongst the first to summit Big Ben on Heard Island (Australia's Tallest Mountain).

=== Conservationist of the Year ===
Year	Awardee	Achievement
2023	Karrina Nolan	‘Original power’ - tackled the lack of clean, affordable power available to First Nation and Torres Strait Islander households.
2022	Linda Sparrow	Linda leads a grassroots conservation movement to create and restore Koala habitats in NSW's Northern Rivers region. She aims to plant 500,000 trees by 2025 to protect Koala populations, as well as many other species and critically endangered tree species through the creation of a vast ecosystem.
2019	Albert Wiggan	Albert is an indigenous ranger, using western science and Indigenous teachings to preserve the waters of Boddergron. When the government tried to build the world's largest LNG gas export terminal at James Price Point (a marine sanctuary), he lobbied the Supreme Court and fronted a blockade.
2018	Numbat Task Force	The Numbat Task Force is working to save Dryandra's numbats, one of only two natural populations left today.
2017	Natalie Isaacs	Founded 1 Million Women - involves more than 600,000 women taking action to fight climate change by altering the way they live. Successful campaigns have included #leaveitontheshelf to reduce plastic purchases and 1M Declaring the Reef in Danger, a petition to save the GBR.
2016	Tim Jarvis	Through his 25ZERO project aimed to highlight the retreat of glaciers on the world's 25 glacial mountains, by summiting 3 of them and raising awareness of their decline.
2015	Tim Faulkner	Faulkner led an initiative to reverse the extinction rate of small mammals of the Australian mainland, through the reintroduction of Tasmanian devils into NSW. He has also played a pivotal role in efforts to prevent the extinction of the Tasmanian devil itself.
2014	Anna Rose	Anna spearheaded Earth Hour Australia's revolution into a year-round social movement, focusing on protecting the GBR. Anna co-founded the Australian Youth Climate Coalition.

=== Spirit of Adventure Award ===
Year	Awardee	Achievement
2023	Dr Kate Leeming OAM	Kate became the first person to cycle across Queen Maud Land on the edge of the Antarctic Plateau.
2022	Sophie Matterson	Sophie spotted five feral camels at Mulga Park station. Sophie spent the next year training the camels to embark on her 4600 km solo trek across the width of Australia. Setting off from Shark Bay, WA in April 2020, she trekked to Coober Pedy, SA. After resting during the summer months and resuming her trek in May 2021, she completed her journey at Byron Bay's Tyagarah Beach in December 2021.
2019	Nick Gleeson	Solo traversed a salt lake in South Australia without the assistance of his seeing-eye dog.
2018	Paul Pritchard	After suffering a traumatic brain injury - resulting in hemiplegia from a slender dolerite column smashing his skull during a 1998 attempt to climb Tasmania's Totem Pole - In 2016 returned to climb Paul climbed one handed and footed to the Totem Pole. In 2017 he led a team of disabled cyclists from Australia's lowest to highest point on a journey of more than 2000 km, from Kati Thanda-Lake Eyre to the summit of Mt Kosciuszko.
2017	Lisa Blair	First woman to sail solo and unassisted around Antarctica in a 184-day voyage.
2016	Brian Freeman, Alyssa Azar, Lachlan Smart	Freeman summited Everest after founding Walking Wounded, assisting returned Australian soldiers through supporting their mental health. Azar became the youngest Australian to summit Everest at 19 yrs old, after having natural disasters thwart her previous 2 attempts. Smart became the youngest person to fly a single engine aircraft solo around the world. At 18 he travelled 45,000 km, stopping in 15 countries.
2015	Huw Kingston	Kingston undertook a 14,000 km circumnavigation of the Mediterranean Sea by foot, kayak, ocean rowboat and bicycle. The trip was used as a fundraiser for Save the Children Australia - which ended up becoming the charity's most successful individual campaigner ever.
2014	Heath Jamieson, Seamus Donaghue	Both joined the charity Walking With The Wounded to tackle a 335 km trek to the South Pole, having both sustained serious injuries in Afghanistan.

=== Young Adventurer of the Year ===
Year	Awardee	Achievement
2023	Lewi Taylor	Climbed all 158 peaks of The Abels (Tasmania) in 158 days.
2022	Gabby Kanizay	Youngest Australian to summit Mt Everest, at 19 years 68 days.
2019	Jimmy Ashby	Covered 39,100 km across 32 counties and four continents in 393 days, from April 2018 to May 2019.
2018	Jade Hameister	Jade set 5 records after journeying the Amundsen Coast to the South pole in 37 days and across 1,300 km. Jade is the youngest person and first Australian woman to ski from the coast of the South Pole and the first woman to set a new route through the Transantarctic Mountain Range. She is the youngest person to complete the Polar Hat Trick, having skied to the north pole at 14 (2016) and becoming the youngest woman to cross Greenland in 2017.
2017	Sam Mitchell	First traverse of the Canning Stock Route unsupported and using an electric fat bike. The bicycle was powered by a trailer carrying solar panels.
2016	Jade Hameister	Became the youngest person in history to ski to the north pole.
2015	Danielle Murdoch	Completed a 4-year motorcycle journey.
2014	Belinda Ritchie	Completed a 12-month trek on horseback along the Bicentennial National Trail.
2013	Ryan Campbell	Broke the World record for the youngest pilot to circumnavigate the globe solo in a single engine aircraft.
2012	Lachie Carracher	Whitewater kayaked in some of Australia's mightiest rivers, as well as those snaking through Canada, China, Laos, Nepal, Uganda, Switzerland, Sumatra, United States, the United Kingdom and Mexico.
2010	Jessica Watson	The youngest person ever to sail around the world solo and unassisted.
2009	Angus Paradice	Paradice completed two challenging horse races in Mongolia at the age of 13.
2008	James Castrission	Completed the world's first Trans-Tasman kayak expedition from Australia to New Zealand.
2008	Justin Jones	Completed the world's first Trans-Tasman kayak expedition from Australia to New Zealand.
2007	Rex Pemberton	Third youngest person in the world to climb the seven summits.
2006	Stephen Fordyce	Completed a mid-winter traverse of the Western Arthurs range in Southwest Tasmania.
2006	Roger Chao	
2005	Rex Pemberton	Youngest Australian to ever climb Mount Everest at the age of 21.
2004	Chris Bray	Walked from Port Davey to Strahan around 300 km of coastline.
2004	Jasper Timm	
2003	Christopher Harris	Youngest person to attempt Mount Everest.
2002	Tim Cope	Cycled across Russia, Siberia, Mongolia, and China in 1999; and paddled the length of the Yenisey River in 2001.
2001	Jeremy Richardson	First Australian team to attempt a winter ascent of Denali, US
2001	Jarlath Weingott	First Australian team to attempt a winter ascent of Denali, US
2001	Angus Weingott	First Australian team to attempt a winter ascent of Denali, US
2000	Krista Bernard	Cycled solo from Indonesia to England in 2000.
1998	Chris Hatherly	Hatherly rode a bike around Australia in 11.5 months during 1996.
1997	David Dicks	unknown
1996	Mark Shearer	2000 km kayaking journey in Chile
1996	Eric Croker	2000 km kayaking journey in Chile
1994	Damon Howes	Spent a year near the Wanderer River on the South West coast of Tasmania.
1994	Deanne Howes	Spent a year near the Wanderer River on the South West coast of Tasmania.
1992	James Woodford	unknown
1992	Adam Kerezsy	unknown
1991	Jeremy Durbin	unknown
1990	John Weir	unknown
1989	Richard Wood	Paddled the entirety of the Murray River in a kayak.

=== Young Conservationist of the Year ===
Year	Awardee	Achievement
2022	Dr Anika Molesworth	Anika has advocated for climate action and environmental conservation, having become one of Australia's leading voices on sustainable farming and food security.
2019	Angelina Arora	Invented a biodegradable alternative to plastic made from prawn shells, decomposed 1.5million times faster. She is now exploring the effect of algae on oil spill remediation.
2018	Sophia Skarparis	Sophia started a petition to ban plastic bags in NSW, gaining more than 10,000 signatures and ensuring the petition was tabled in the NSW government.
2017	Madison Stewart	Madison began filming sharks after she began scuba diving at 12. Since discovering the declining shark numbers, she seeks to reconnect humans to sharks through film and has lobbied supermarkets to stop the sale of shark products.
2016	Joshua Gilbert	Gilbert has caused a great increase in climate change activism as the chair of the NSW Young Farmers Association amongst farmers and shifted the organisation's focus from Royal Commission to Climate Change.
2015	Amelia Telford	Telford joined the Australian Youth Climate Coalition and founded Seed. She helped create a network of young Aboriginal people which provides access to training and support around climate change, sustainability and conservation.
2014	Bindie Irwin	Bindi gave her voice in the documentary Surviving Earth. She is global ambassador for Wildlife Warriors Worldwide and most notably criticised the US Secretary of State, Hillary Clinton after her essay, included in Clinton's book, was heavily edited.

== See also ==
- Geographic magazine
