= Transpacific Yacht Race =

Yachting race

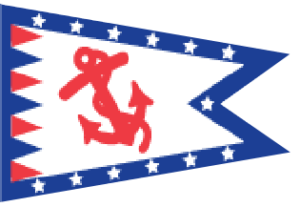
- TPYC Burgee
- First held: 11 June 1906
- Last held: 1 July 2025
- Organizer: Transpacific Yacht Club
- Start: Point Fermin Light, California
- Finish: Diamond Head Lighthouse, Hawaii
- Venue: North Pacific Ocean
- Length: 2,225 nmi (2,560 mi; 4,121 km)
- Website: transpacyc.com

The Transpacific Yacht Race (Transpac) is a biennial offshore yacht race held in odd-numbered years starting off the Pt. Fermin buoy in San Pedro, California and ending off Diamond Head in Hawaii, a distance of around 2,225 nautical miles (2,560 mi; 4,121 km).

Famous for fast downwind sailing under spinnaker in the trade winds, it is one of yachting's premier offshore races and attracts entrants from all over the world. The race is currently organized by the Transpacific Yacht Club, founded in 1928 to handle race administration.

The race has been held every other year with the exception of World War I and World War II, and switched from every even-numbered year to every odd-numbered years so not to conflict with the Newport Bermuda Race, also started in 1906.

The idea originated from an invite King Kalākaua made to members of the San Francisco Yacht Club to race from San Francisco Bay to Honolulu for his birthday in 1886. Kamaʻāina businessman and Hawaiian Kingdom loyalist Clarence W. Macfarlane finally gathered enough interest from California yachtmen to undertake the voyage in 1906, and sailed to San Francisco aboard his 48' schooner La Paloma, however he arrived shortly after the earthquake, and felt initiating a race starting at the Golden Gate to be in poor taste.

Macfarlane sailed down to Los Angeles at the suggestion of fellow competitor Henry H. Sinclair, where the then named South Coast Yacht Club served as host. La Paloma, Sinclair aboard his 86' schooner Lurline representing SCYC, and Charles Tutt representing New York Yacht Club aboard the 112' ketch Anemone comprised the first Transpac fleet.

Lurline crossed the finish line at the Diamond Head Lighthouse with an elapsed time of 12 days, 9 hours, and 59 minutes to win on both corrected and elapsed time despite giving Lurline and La Paloma a 12 and 27 hour time advantage in scoring.

The South Coast Yacht Club has since been renamed the Los Angeles Yacht Club. Hawaii Yacht Club served as host in Hawaii, joined by the Waikiki Yacht Club upon its founding.

In 1980, a race of similar distance and route, the Pacific Cup from San Francisco to Hawaii commenced, racing opposite the Transpac every even-numbered year. It is known for not being as competitive as the Transpac, and is often seen as a proving ground for aspiring Transpac racers.

== Notable records ==
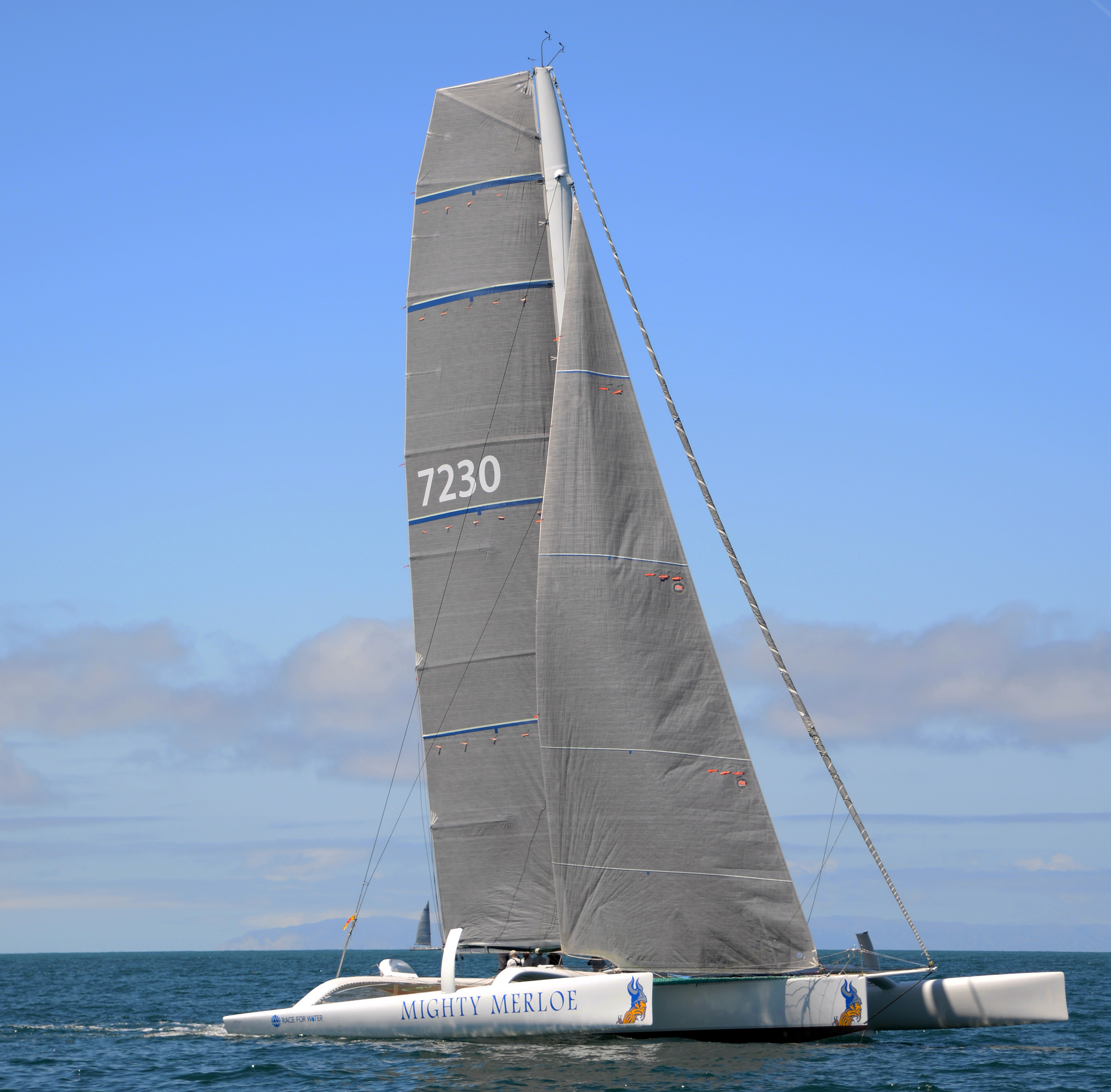
Mighty Merloe

- Fully Crewed Multihull Elapsed time: Mighty Merloe (ORMA 60 trimaran), 2017 of 4 days, 6 hours, 32 minutes, 30 seconds.
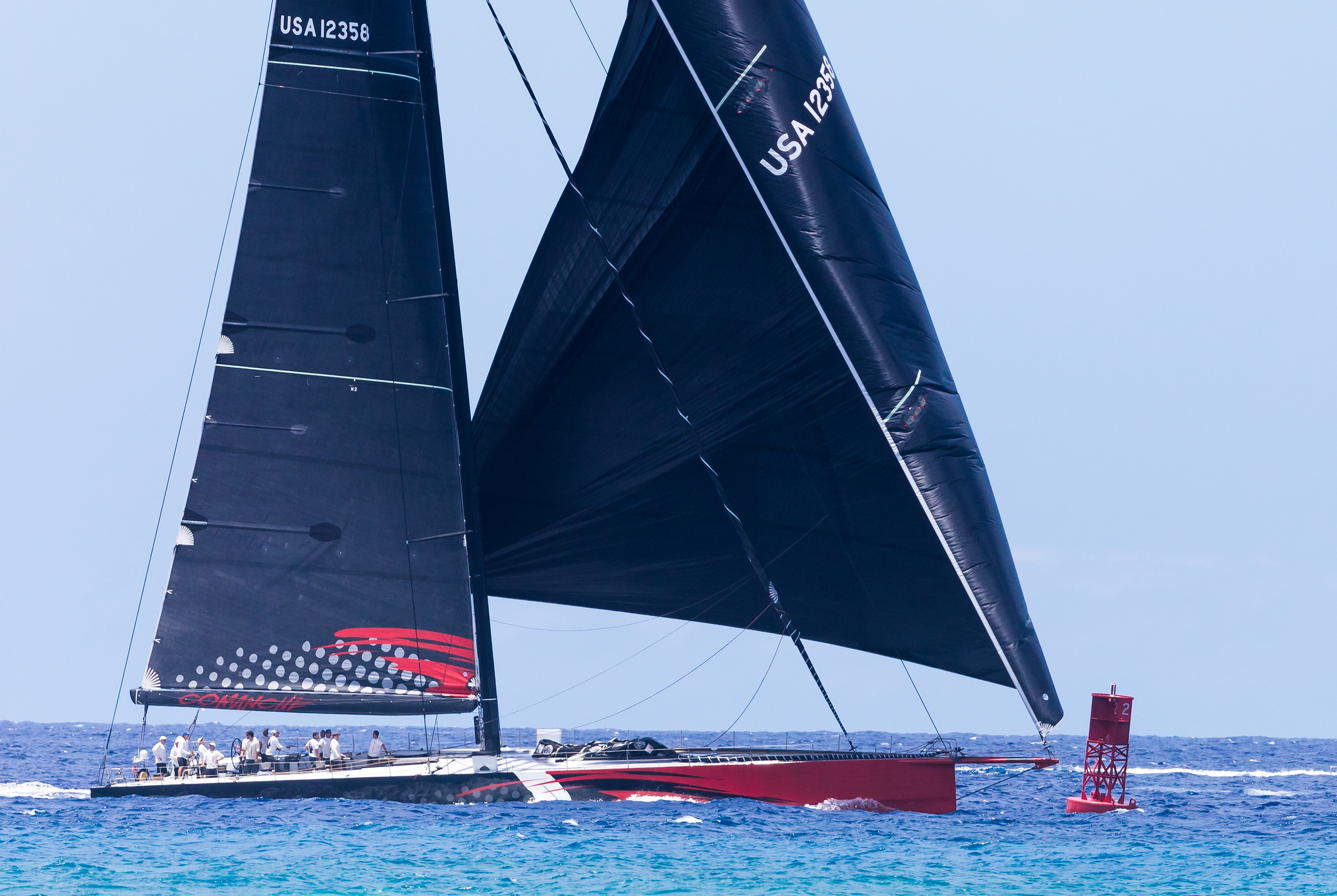
- Comanche crossing the Diamond Head finish line in 2017
  Fully Crewed Monohull Elapsed time: Comanche, 2017 of 5 days, 1 hours, 55 minutes, 26 seconds.
- Double Handed: Pegasus 50, 2009, sailed by Philippe Kahn and Mark Christensen, set a new record of 7 days, 19 hours, 38 minutes and 35 seconds.

In 1969, French sailing legend Éric Tabarly shadowed the race with his Pen Duick IV, one of the world's first trimarans competitive in all wind conditions. He originally intended to enter the race but was unaware that multihulls were not invited. Having started with all other participants, Tabarly and his crew set an unofficial record of 8 days and 13 hours, almost a day ahead of official winner and record-setter Blackfin.

In 2013, the fully crewed monohull, Dorade, won first overall, making it the oldest boat in the fleet to win and a 2-time winner, having won the Transpac in 1936, 77 years prior.

The 2019 edition of the race, its fiftieth, saw the sinking of a yacht for the first time in its history, when the 68 foot mono-hulled sailboat Santa Cruz 70 OEX suffered rudder damage and an uncontrollable water intrusion. The crew was rescued by another racing boat. This edition also saw the greatest number of skippers dropping out of the race.

== Record history ==
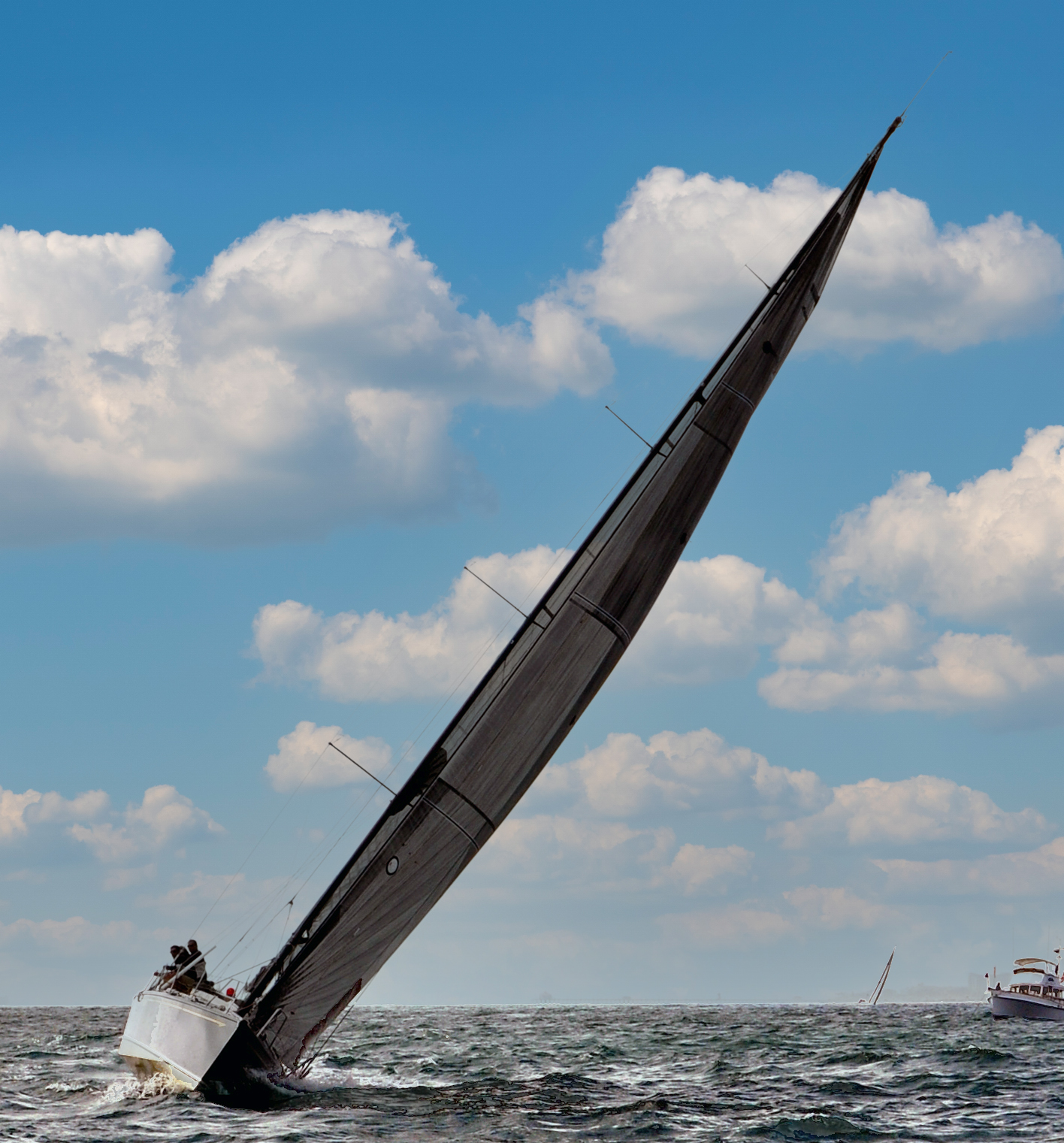
S/Y Ragtime, the 1973 & 1975 Transpac Winner

Lurline set a high bar for the race from the very Transpac, with a record elapsed time of 12 days, 9 hours, and 59 minutes that would not be broken for 20 years until Don Lee's Invader with 12:02:48:03 in 1926. 12 days would remain the record for 40 years until 1949 with Richard Rheem's elapsed time of 10:10:13:09 aboard "Morning Star".

The distinction of longest elapsed time goes to William Merry's ketch Viking Childe, completing the race with an elapsed time of 23 days, 23 hours and 55 minutes in 1939, almost 10 days after first to finish R.J. Reynolds' Blitzen with 14:10:47:06.

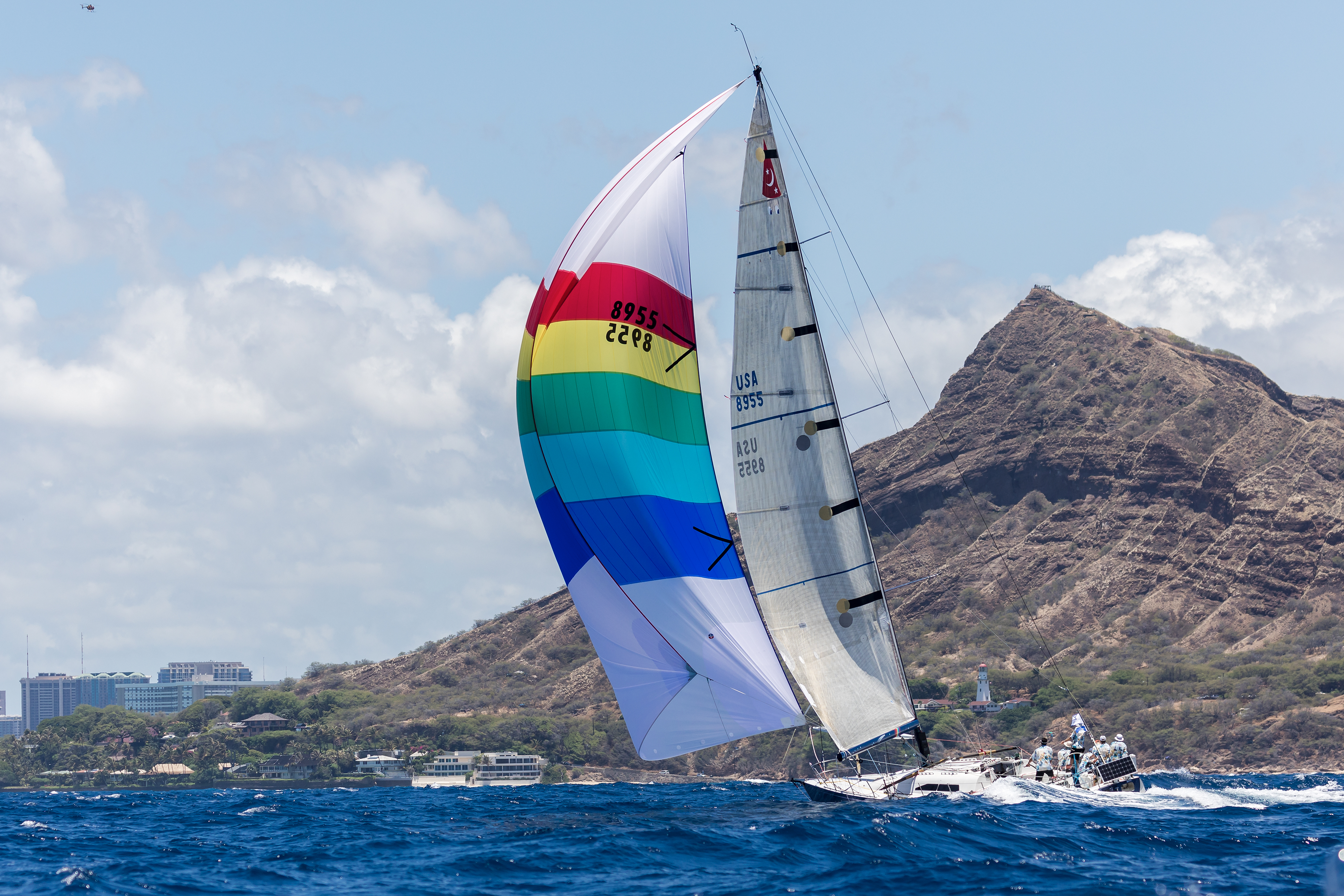
Merlin approaching Diamond Head in 2017

In 1977, the yacht Merlin, designed by Bill Lee, set an elapsed time record of 8 days, 11 hours, 1 minute. This record would stand for 20 years. Ending Merlin's record, in the 1997 race a new monohull elapsed time record of 7 days, 11 hours, 41 minutes, and 27 seconds was set by Roy E. Disney's Pyewacket, a Santa Cruz 70 ultralight also designed by Bill Lee. The record fell once again in 2005, with Hasso Plattner's Morning Glory, a maxZ86 from Germany. Morning Glory was the scratch boat when it led a five-boat assault on the record for monohulls. She finished the race in 6 days, 16 hours, 4 minutes, and 11 seconds to win "the Barn Door" trophy, a slab of carved koa wood traditionally awarded to the monohull with the fastest elapsed time.

In 1995, multihulls were invited to participate for the first time, but not eligible for the Barn Door trophy. Steve Fosset set a new race record in 1995 on his 60' trimaran Lakota, of 6 days 16 hours 7 minutes 16 seconds. Two years later in 1997, this record was broken by the 86' catamaran Explorer with a time of 5 days 9 hours 18 minutes 26 seconds. 2017 saw Howard Enloe and his boat the Mighty Merloe smash the record by over 25 hours making the trip in just over 4 days.

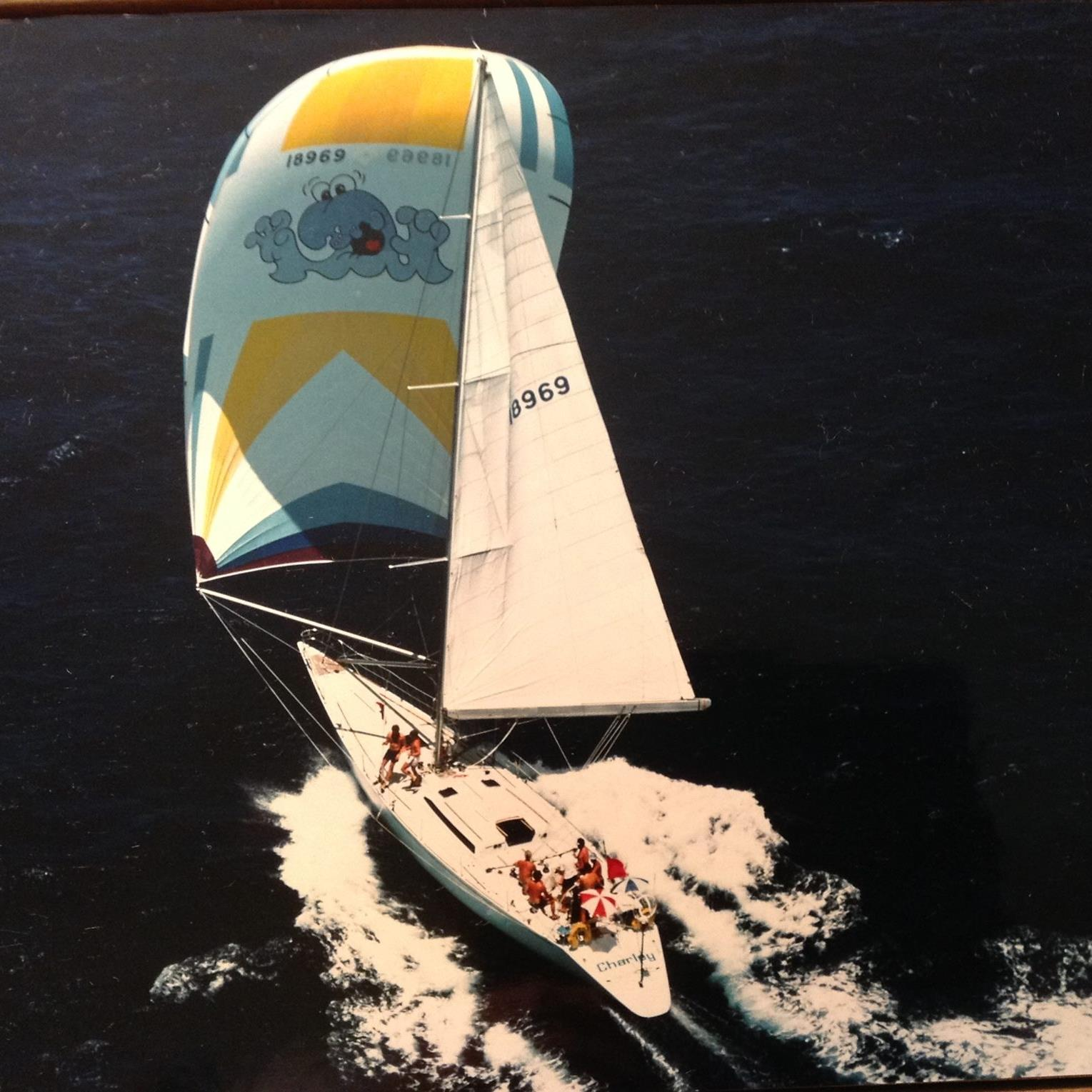
Charley, the 1983 Transpac winner

On July 7, 2009, Alfa Romeo II beat the Morning Glory record for best day's run set in the 2005 race, by sailing 399 nautical miles (459 mi; 739 km) in 24 hours. The next two days she broke her own best-day record by sailing 420 nautical miles (480 mi; 780 km) and 431 nautical miles (496 mi; 798 km). First to finish the 2009 Transpac, Alfa Romeo II set a Transpac race elapsed-time record of 5 days, 14 hours, 36 minutes, 20 seconds. This represents a new race record for monohulls; the multihull record of 5 days, 9 hours, 18 minutes, set by Bruno Peyron in the 1997 race, remains. However, because she must use "stored power" (a diesel engine) to move, Alfa Romeo II, sailing in the "unlimited" class, was not eligible for the traditional "Barn Door" trophy, but instead was the inaugural winner of a new trophy dedicated by Trisha Steele, called the "Merlin Trophy". However from 2019 yachts eligible for this trophy must use manual power only

In the double-handed division, Pegasus 50, sailed by Philippe Kahn and Mark Christensen, set a new record of 7 days, 19 hours, 38 minutes and 35 seconds. They pioneered use of an iPhone, with Fullpower-MotionX GPS technology.

== References in popular culture ==
In the 1975 movie Jaws, the character Matt Hooper, played by Richard Dreyfuss, claims that he has "crewed three Transpacs" as a means of establishing his seamanship credentials with Quint.

The 2008 documentary Morning Light is a film about the 2007 Disney-sponsored competitors in the race.

== Transpac Honolulu Race Elapsed Time Record Trophy ==
The Transpac Honolulu Race Elapsed Time Record Trophy is awarded to the Record Holder for the fastest elapsed time by a monohull yacht in the race.

The list of Los Angeles to Honolulu Record Holders is:

- 1906 Lurline H.H. Sinclair 12:09:59
- 1926 Invader Don M. Lee 12:02:48:03
- 1949 Morning Star Richard S. Rheem 10:10:13:09
- 1955 Morning Star Richard S. Rheem 9:15:05:10
- 1965 Ticonderoga Robert Johnson 9:13:51:02
- 1969 Blackfin Kenneth DeMeuse 9:10:21:00
- 1971 Windward Passage Mark Johnson 9:09:06:48
- 1977 Merlin Bill Lee 8:11:01:45
- 1997 Pyewacket Roy P. Disney 7:15:24:40
- 1999 Pyewacket Roy E. Disney 7:11:41:27
- 2005 Morning Glory Hasso Plattner 6:16:04:11
- 2009 Alfa Romeo Neville Crichton 5:14:36:20
- 2017 Comanche Ken Read 5:01:55:26

== Barn Door Trophy ==
The Barn Door Trophy is awarded each race for the Fastest Monohull Elapsed Time in the race. It was originally called the "First to Finish" Trophy. Since 2009, it has been restricted to manual power only sailing yachts.

Barn Door Winners Year Boat Owner/Skipper Time

- 1906 Lurline H.H. Sinclair 12:09:59 *
- 1908 Lurline H.H. Sinclair 13:21:31
- 1910 Hawaii Hawaii Syndicate 14:03:23
- 1912 Lurline A.E. Davis 13:17:03
- 1923 (S.Barb.) Mariner L.A. Norris 11:14:46
- 1926 Invader Don M. Lee 12:02:48:03 *
- 1928 (Balboa) Talayha L. Lippman 13:04:58:30
- 1930 Enchantress Morgan Adams 12:13:22:52
- 1932 (S.Barb.) Fayth William S. McNutt 14:14:33:00
- 1934 Vileehi H.T. Horton 13:03:42:26
- 1936 (S.Mon.) Dorade James Flood 13:07:20:04
- 1939 (S.Fran.) Contender Richard R. Loynes 14:07:50:00
- 1941 Stella Maris II Dr. A. Steele 13:21:03:55
- 1947 Chubasco W.L. Stewart Jr. 12:15:51:18
- 1949 Morning Star Richard S. Rheem 10:10:13:09 *
- 1951 Morning Star Richard S. Rheem 10:16:44:33
- 1953 Goodwill R.E. Larrabee 11:02:17:24
- 1955 Morning Star Richard S. Rheem 9:15:05:10 *
- 1957 Barlovento Frank Hooykaas 11:13:02:44
- 1959 Goodwill Ralph Larrabee 10:12:16:15
- 1961 Sirius II Howard F. Ahmanson 10:10:38:35
- 1963 Ticonderoga Robert Johnson 11:16:46:33
- 1965 Ticonderoga Robert Johnson 9:13:51:02 *
- 1967 Stormvogel Cornelius Bruynzeel 11:14:10:56
- 1969 Blackfin Kenneth DeMeuse 9:10:21:00 *
- 1971 Windward Passage Mark Johnson 9:09:06:48 *
- 1973 Ragtime Ragtime Syndicate 10:14:00:40
- 1975 Ragtime White/Pasquini 9:23:54:51
- 1977 Merlin Bill Lee 8:11:01:45 *
- 1979 Drifter Harry Moloschco 11:18:01:04
- 1981 Merlin Nick Frazee 8:11:02:31
- 1983 Charley Nolan K. Bushnell 9:01:53:48
- 1985 Swiftsure III Nick/Robert Frazee 10:19:21:47
- 1987 Merlin Donn Campion 8:12:00:40
- 1989 Silver Bullet John DeLaura 8:12:50:35
- 1991 Chance Robert McNulty 9:21:59:35
- 1993 Silver Bullet John DeLaura 9:09:11:17
- 1995 Cheval 95 Hal Ward 9:01:32:20
- 1997 Pyewacket Roy Pat Disney (son of Roy E. Disney) 7:15:24:40 *
- 1999 Pyewacket Roy E. Disney 7:11:41:27 *
- 2001 Pegasus Philippe Kahn 8:02:34:03
- 2003 Pegasus 77 Philippe Kahn 7:16:31:17
- 2005 Morning Glory Hasso Plattner 6:16:04:11*
- 2007 Pyewacket Roy Pat Disney 7:19:08:10
- 2009 Alfa Romeo Neville Crichton 5:14:36:20*
- 2011 Bella Mente Hap Fauth 6:19:44:28
- 2013 Wizard Dave Askew 7:7:53:46
- 2015 Rio 100 Manouch Moshayedi 7:05:34:07
- 2017 Rio 100 Manouch Moshayedi 6:17:09:09

* record

== See also ==
- Pacific Cup
- Vic-Maui Yacht Race
