= Will Oxley =

Australian racing skipper and marine biologist (born 1965)

Personal information
- Full name: William Oxley
- Nationality: Australian
- Born: 1965 (age 60–61)

Sailing career
- Sport: Sailing

William Oxley (born 1965) is a racing skipper/navigator and marine biologist who has completed more than 300,000 nm of ocean racing including five round the world races and 21Sydney to Hobart races. From 1992 to 2000 he worked at the Australian Institute of Marine Science as part of the Long-term Monitoring Project which is intended to monitor the condition of the Great Barrier Reef.

He skippered Compaq in the BT Global Challenge 2000/01 and he was also the weather coordinator for the Swedish VICTORY Challenge America's Cup Team. He provided navigation and weather support for Puma in the 2008/09 Volvo Ocean Race. For the 2011–12 Volvo Ocean Race he was navigator aboard Camper (Emirates Team New Zealand). Oxley was the navigator for Team Alvimedica in the 2014–15 Volvo Ocean Race.

He contributes to Australian Sailing.

In 2014, Oxley published an e-book with Amazon titled Modern Race Navigation: Expedition Software in Action. In 2017, he published his second e-book "Expedition Navigation Software: A Gentle Introduction".
