= Jade Hameister =

Australian woman (born 2001)

Jade Hameister OAM
- Born: 5 June 2001 (age 25)
- Citizenship: Australian
- Known for: Youngest person to ski to the North Pole, anywhere outside the last degree. Youngest woman to cross Greenland icecap.

Jade Hameister OAM (born 5 June 2001) is an Australian woman who, at age 16, became the youngest person in history to pull off the "polar hat-trick", ski to the North and South Poles, and cross the second largest polar icecap on the planet: Greenland. Hameister travelled over 1,300 km (800 mi) on these three missions, which totalled almost four months on ice.

Her "Polar Quest" expeditions were captured as part of a National Geographic feature-length documentary released in 2018 that documented both her Greenland and South Pole expeditions.

== North Pole ==
In April 2016, Hameister travelled 150 km (90 mi) from 88 degrees 40 over the drifting polar sea ice to arrive at the North Pole to become the youngest person (male or female) in history to ski to the North Pole from anywhere outside 89 degrees.

Each day, Hameister skied with her 50 kg (100 lb) sled for 8–10 hours navigating around open "leads" of water or climbing over "pressure ridges" in the ice. Temperatures were as low as −40 °C (−40 °F) and Hameister faced other risks such as falling through thin ice into the freezing Arctic waters and polar bears.

Hameister was awarded the Australian Geographic Society's Young Adventurer of the Year for her 2016 North Pole expedition, which was captured in the National Geographic documentary On Thin Ice: Jade’s Polar Dream that aired in 170 countries.

== Greenland Ice Caps ==
On the second expedition, Hameister completed the 550 km (350 mi) traverse on the Greenland icecaps departing from Kangerlussuaq on the West Coast and finishing at Isortoq Hut on the East Coast on 4 June 2017. She covered approximately 25 km (15 mi) a day and completed the expedition in 27 days, making her the youngest woman in history to cross the Greenland icecaps.

Hameister was hit early in the trip by a blizzard but due to the warm weather she was pelted with rain instead of snow, which forced her to shorten daily travel and dry out in her tent.

== South Pole ==
Hameister embarked on the final leg of her Polar quest at the end of November 2017. Hameister covered over 600 km (370 mi) from the Ross Ice Shelf at the coast of Antarctica to the South Pole. She completed the trek in 37 days and reached the South Pole on 10 January 2018. Hameister claimed a handful of titles, including the youngest person in history and the first Australian woman to ski from the coast to the South Pole.

After Hameister's 2016 TED talk was posted to YouTube, several comments were posted that said "make me a sandwich." Upon reaching the South Pole, she posed for a photo while holding a ham and cheese sandwich. In her social media post she invited the commenters to "ski 37 days and 600 km [370 mi] to the South Pole and you can eat it."

== Advocacy ==
She delivered a TEDx Talk in August 2016 and in early 2017 presented to a combined live audience of over 12,000 students at ImagiNATION in Melbourne, Sydney, and Brisbane. Jade also attended the National Geographic Explorers Symposium in Washington DC in 2016 and 2017.

== Works ==
Hameister documented her polar hat-trick of expeditions in her book, My Polar Dream, published by Pan Macmillan Australia in September 2018. It was published as Polar Explorer by Feiwel & Friends in the United States.

== Recognition ==
In March 2018, Hameister was named one of Vogue Australia's 2018 Game Changers. In September 2018 she became one of The Australian Financial Review's 100 Women of Influence in the Young Leader category.

Hameister was awarded Medal of the Order of Australia (OAM) in the 2019 Queen's Birthday Honours for her "service to polar exploration", along with her father, Paul Hameister, who co-founded the property development company Hamton and accompanied Jade Hameister on her expeditions.
