= Victoria to Maui Yacht Race =

Boat race

Vic-Maui International Yacht Race
Event information
- Race area: Pacific Ocean
- Sponsor: Royal Vancouver Yacht Club and the Lahaina Yacht Club
- Distance: 2,308-nautical-mile (4,274 km)
- Website: https://vicmaui.org/

The Victoria to Maui International Yacht Race (Vic-Maui) is the longest offshore sailing race off the west coast of North America. First contested in 1965, since 1968 the Vic-Maui has run in even-numbered years, starting in June or July off Victoria, British Columbia, Canada and finishing near Lahaina, Maui, United States, a distance of approximately 2,308 nautical miles (4,274 km).

Vic-Maui challenges navigators to demonstrate their weather routing and navigational skills both out at sea and maneuvering in the Strait of Juan de Fuca. Success depends on the navigator's skill in predicting where the high pressure zone of the North Pacific Subtropical Gyre and trade winds will be, nearly a week into the future.

== History ==
The first Vic-Maui race was sailed in 1965. The race was created by Royal Vancouver Yacht Club (RVYC) member Jim Innes, at that time a pilot for Canadian Pacific Airlines. He talked about the idea of a race originating in Victoria and ending some 2308 nautical miles away in Maui, and convinced three other skippers to start with him off Brotchie Ledge in 1965. With Jim in his Lapworth 36' "Long Gone", there was Lol Killam of RVYC with the 45' sloop "Velaris", Ron Ramsay of the Royal Victoria Yacht Club with the 45' ketch "Norena of White" and Cranston 'Boo' Paschall from Seattle Yacht club with his 80' ketch "Tatoosh". The race and the weather were typical for most of the races to follow. Westerlies in the Juan de Fuca Strait, left turn down the coast to about the latitude of San Francisco followed by a right turn with the northeasterly trade winds filling spinnakers and the downhill sun run to Maui. Three boats finished the race some 15 days later at Kahalui Harbour on the north coast of Maui with the fourth "Tatoosh", having used the motor and arrived prior, greeting the three arrivals with Mai Tais.

During their stay in Maui they met up with the originators of what would become the Lahaina Yacht Club. Upon returning to BC waters both Jim and Lol proceeded to convince the RVYC and the newly organized LYC to jointly sponsor such a race and thus the Vic-Maui International Yacht Race was born. The first official race was in 1968 with 14 boats entered. Bill Killam's Porpoise III swept the fleet first to finish and first on corrected time. She took 17 days, 6 hours and 50 minutes. The race, heralded as a FUN RACE has encouraged both the ardent racer and the cruiser-racer. It has been held every even year since 1968 with 2014 being the 25th Vic-Maui race. The number of entrants has ranged from 4 to 37 boats.

Records have been broken many times since the first official race in 1968. "Grand Illusion" skippered by James McDowell of the LYC completed the race in 9 days, 2 hours and 8 minutes in 2000, breaking the previous record of 9 days, 19 hours and 36 minutes set by "Pyewacket" skippered by Roy Disney in 1996. In 2016, on the 50th anniversary of the race, "Valkyrie", a TP52 of the Royal Vancouver Yacht Club skippered by Jason Rhodes and Gavin Brackett set a new record of 8 days, 9 hours, 17 minutes and 50 seconds. This record still holds.

== See also ==
- Swiftsure Yacht Race
- Transpacific Yacht Race
