= Transpacific Yacht Club =

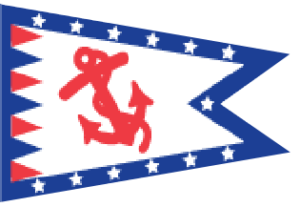
- Burgee
- Short name: TPYC
- Founded: 1928
- Location: Pacific Ocean
- Commodore: Alan Andrews
- First Commodore: Clarence MacFarlane
- Website: transpacyc.com

The Transpacific Yacht Club (TPYC) was founded in 1928 to serve as the organizer of the world-renowned Transpacific Yacht Race ("the Transpac") from Los Angeles to Honolulu.

== Transpac ==
First held in 1906, the Transpac race was originally held on even numbered years. Founded the same year as the also biennial Newport Bermuda Race down America's East Coast, the race organizers agreed to move its races to odd-numbered years to allow racers to participate in both, commencing with the 1939 race.

The Transpac Race was originally the vision of Hawaii’s King Kalākaua as a way to build the islands' ties with the U.S. mainland, and has become one of the oldest and longest enduring ocean race in the world.

== Tahiti Race ==
Over the years TPYC has also been responsible for organizing the Los Angeles to Tahiti Race. The Tahiti Race was most recently scheduled for April and May, 2022 but was cancelled.

== Club information ==
Initially organized on an ad hoc basis by various yacht clubs in both California and Hawaii, TPYC was founded to serve as the keeper of records and serve as the official organizer of the race in 1928, and formally incorporated in 1937. Membership in the Club is open to sailors who have completed a race held by the Club. Over 600 sailors from around the globe are currently Transpac members.

The Transpacific Yacht Club partnered with the Newport Harbor Nautical Museum in 2008 to act as a physical location for the club and house its history and memorabilia. Unfortunately, the museum closed in 2021 as a result of COVID-19. While the museum's collections are currently being held by the Newport Beach Historical Society, the current disposition of TPYC's memorabilia is unclear.

The club still also maintains an office space in Ala Wai Harbor in Honolulu, with a number of its perpetual trophies on display at the Waikiki Yacht Club.
