= Icelandic Geographic =

Magazine about Icelandic nature & people

Icelandic Geographic was a magazine about the nature and people of Iceland.

== History and profile ==
The first issue of Icelandic Geographic was published in August 2002. The magazine was part of Polar Publishing.
