= David McFaull =

American sailor

Medal record

Sailing

Representing United States

Olympic Games
Silver medal – second place	1976 Montreal	Tornado

David McFaull (November 10, 1948 – July 25, 1997) was an American sailor. He won a silver medal in the Tornado class with Michael Rothwell at the 1976 Summer Olympics in Montreal.
