= Yacht racing =

Sport involving sailing yachts and larger sailboats

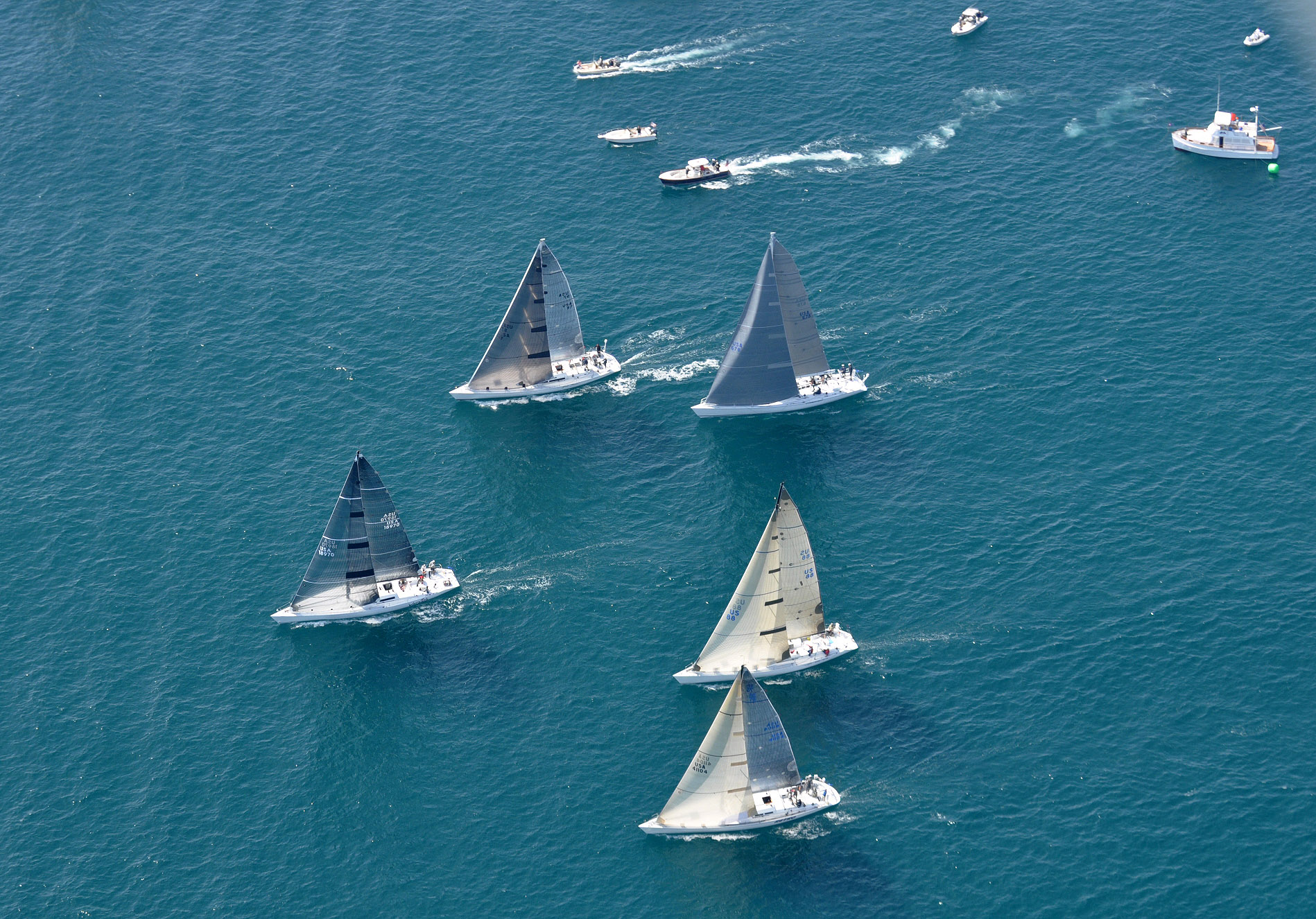
Newport Beach to Cabo San Lucas race start 2013

Yacht racing is a sailing sport involving sailing yachts and larger sailboats, as distinguished from dinghy racing, which involves open boats. It is composed of multiple yachts, in direct competition, racing around a course marked by buoys or other fixed navigational devices or racing longer distances across open water from point-to-point. It can involve a series of races with buoy racing or multiple legs when point-to-point racing.

== History ==
Yachting, that is, recreational boating, is very old, as exemplified in the ancient poem Catullus 4 (translated here by James Michie):

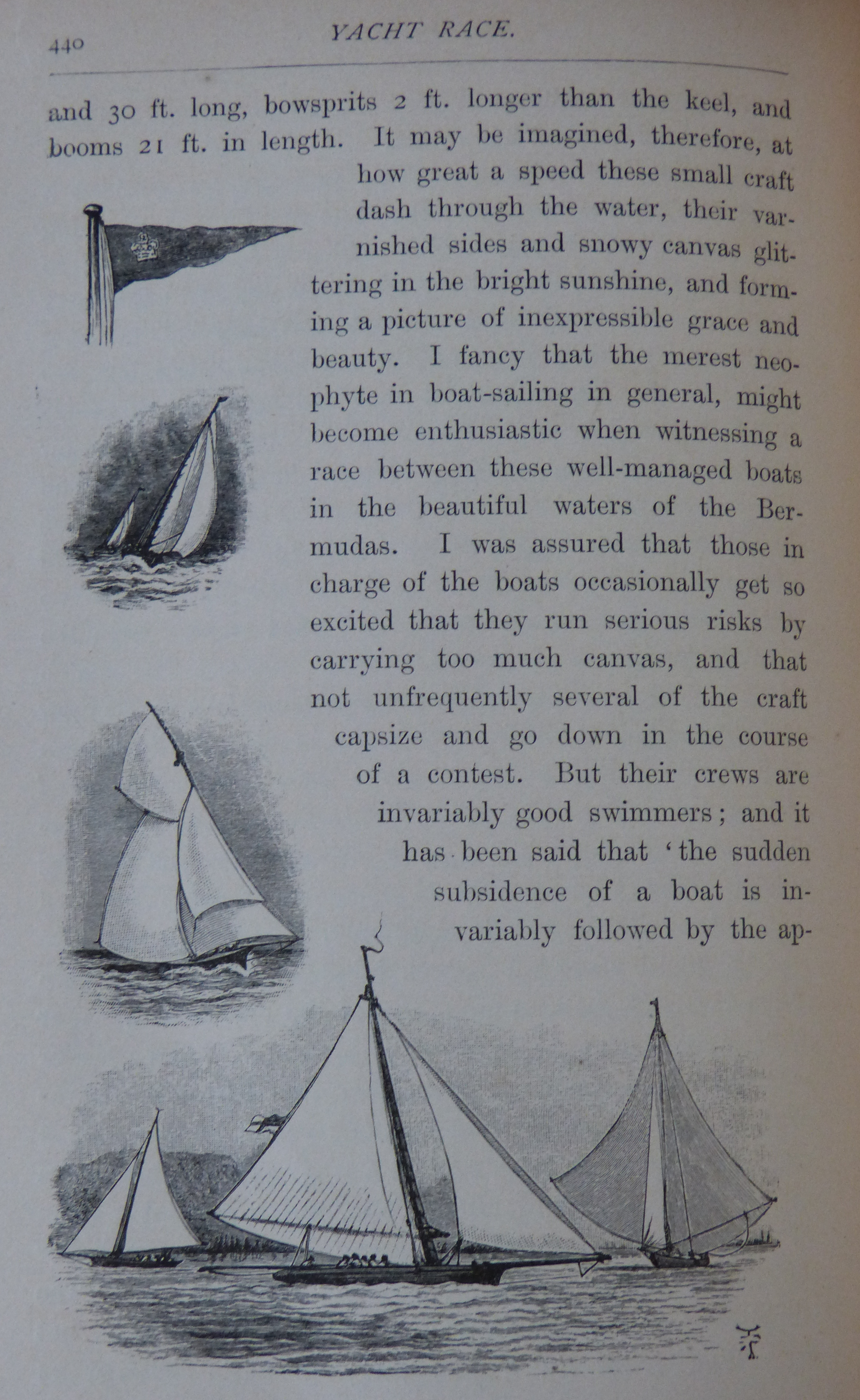
1883 description of the racing of Bermudian boats, by Lady Brassey, with illustrations showing the Bermuda rig. Initially, working vessels were rented for weekend racing in Bermuda, but affluent competitors of the Royal Bermuda Yacht Club soon used purpose-built racers.

The yacht you see there, friends,
says that she's been
The fastest piece of timber ever seen;
She swears that once she could have overhauled
All rival boats, whether the challenge called
For racing under canvas or with oars.

"Yacht" is referred to as deriving from either Norwegian ("jagt"), Middle Low German ("jaght") or from the Dutch word jacht, which means "a swift light vessel of war, commerce or pleasure. The sporting element in the word lies in the derivation of jaght from the root jaghen, which means to hunt, chase or pursue…."

The formal racing of boats is believed to have started with sailboats in the Netherlands sometime in the 17th century. Soon, in England, custom-built racing "yachts" began to emerge and the Royal Yacht Squadron was established in 1815. In 1661 John Evelyn recorded a competition between Katherine and Anne, two large royal sailing vessels both of English design, "…the wager 100-1; the race from Greenwich to Gravesend and back." One of the vessels was owned, and sometimes steered, by Charles II.

In 1782, the Cumberland Fleet, a class of sailing vessel known for its ability to sail close to the wind, were painted racing up the Thames River with spectators viewing from a bridge. Much like today, this obsession with sailing close to the wind with speed and efficiency fueled the racing community.

In the 19th century, most yacht races were started by allotting starting positions to the competitors. Buoys were laid in a straight line, to which the competitors attached their yachts by means of spring ropes. The yachts were required to keep all the sails forward of the mainmast on deck until the starting signal was given. The Yacht Racing Association was founded in 1875 by Prince Batthyany-Strattman, Captain J. W. Hughes, and Dixon Kemp. The Y.R.A. wrote standardised yacht racing rules which included the 'Flying Start' used today.

Bringing yacht racing to the forefront of public life, the America's Cup was first raced in 1851 between the New York Yacht Club and the Royal Yacht Squadron. Not ruled or regulated by measurement criteria as today, the second-place finisher was Aurora, "and but for the fact that time allowance had been waived for the race she would have been the winner by a handsome margin." Subsequently, the Cup races were conducted, usually every three to four years, based on a challenge issued by one club to the current Cup holder, which until 1983 was the NYYC.

As of 2017, the La Ciotat-based Partridge 1885 is documented as being the world's oldest, still fully operational classic racing yacht.

== Rules and ratings ==
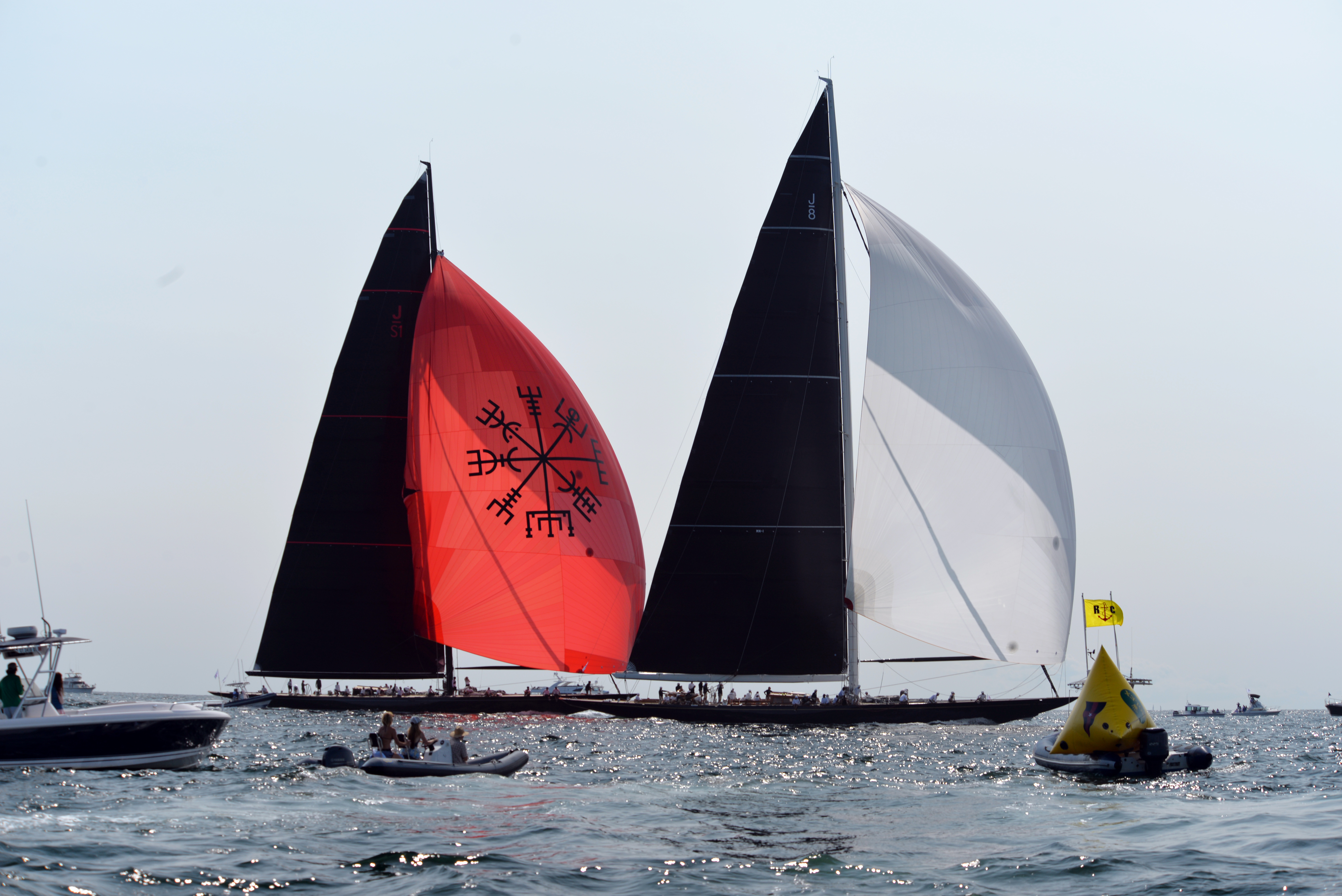
Yacht racing

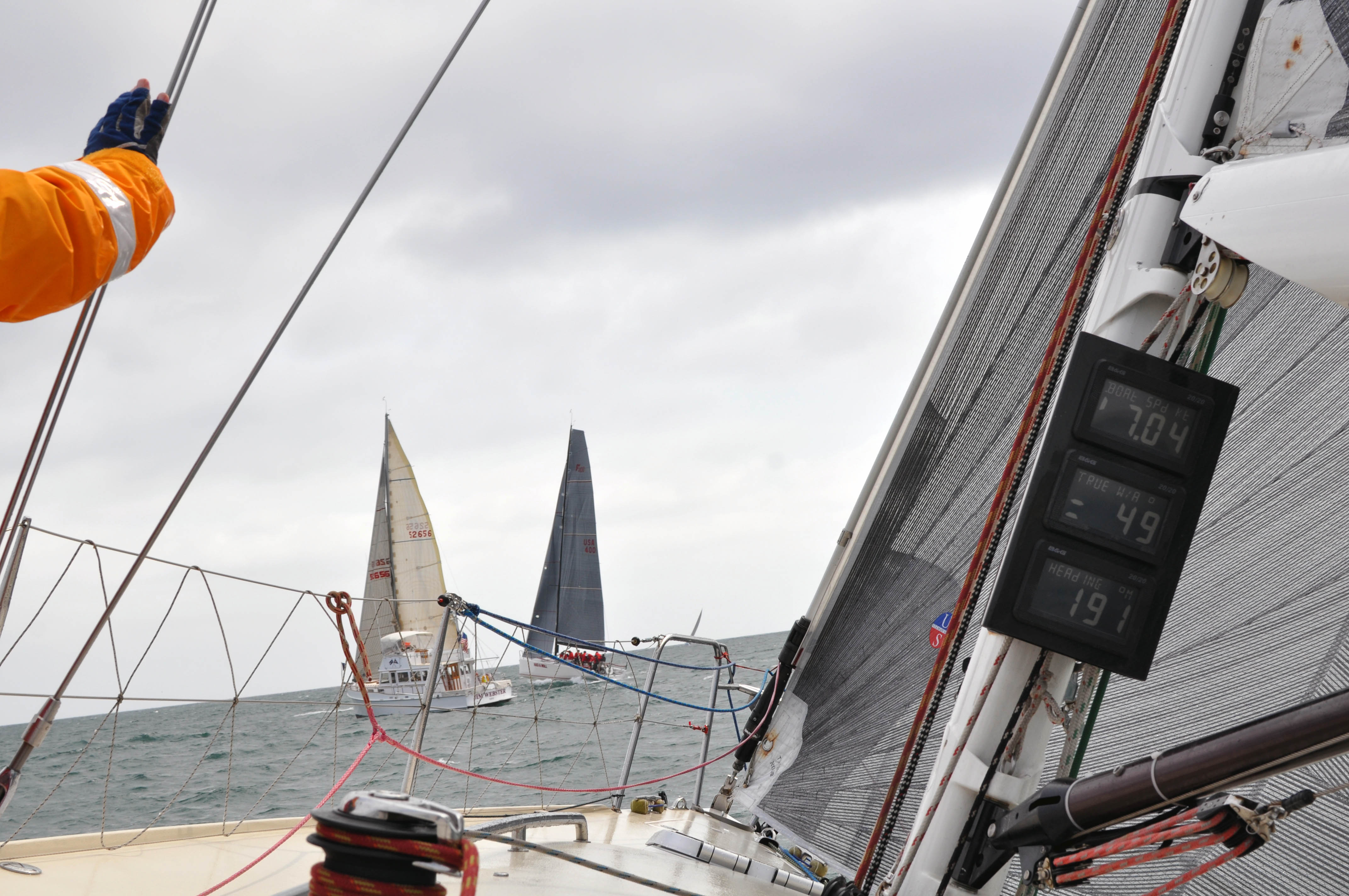
A yacht race at the finish line

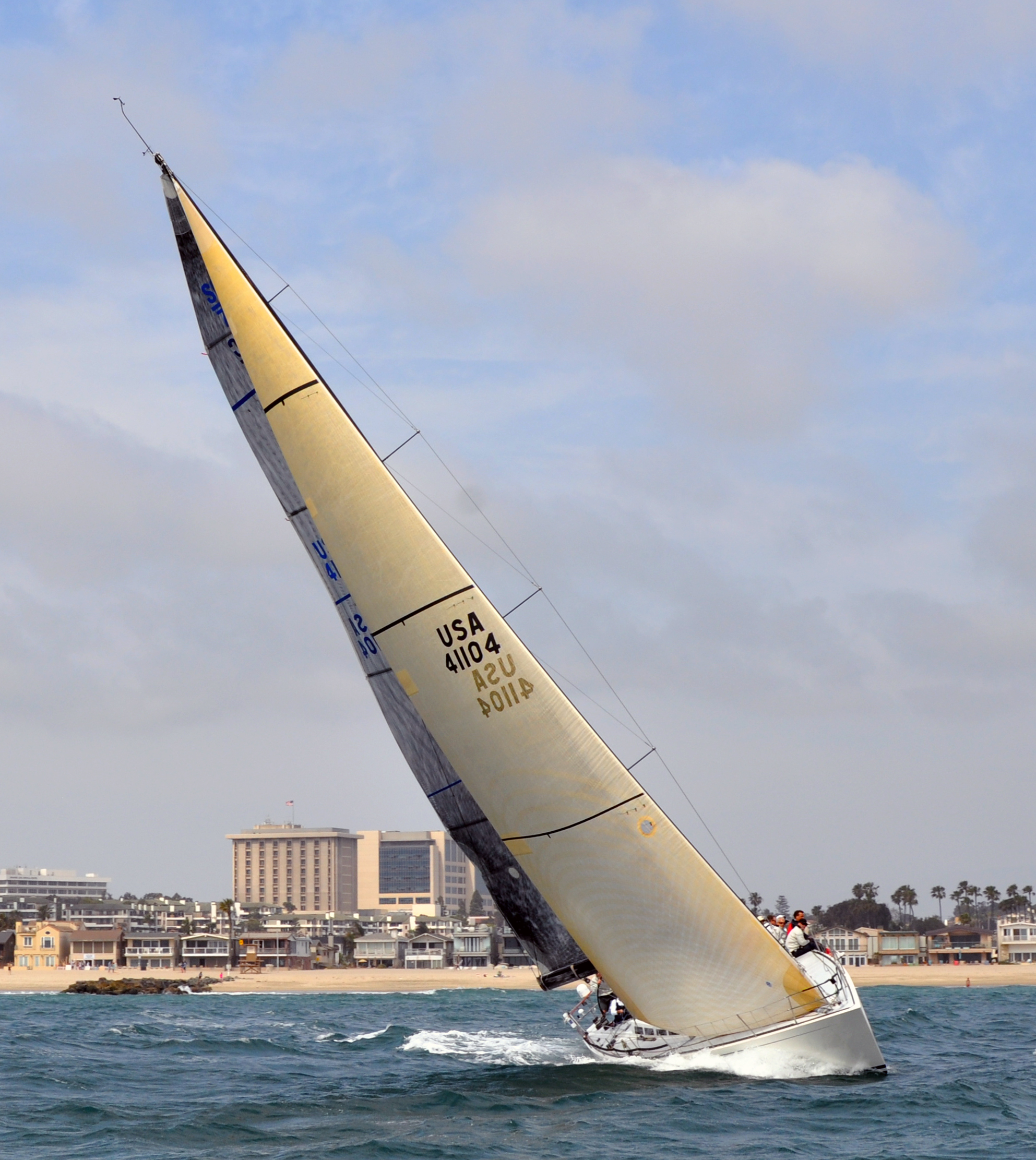
Santa Cruz 70 Retro 2013 Ahmanson Cup regatta, Newport Beach, California

As yacht racing became more prevalent, and yacht design more diverse, it was necessary to establish systems of measurements and time allowances due to the differences in boat design. Longer yachts are inherently faster than shorter ones; therefore, in the interests of fairness, in the 1820s a "primitive system of time allowance was introduced on the Solent." Larger yachts were handicapped; but owners with the biggest vessels had a problem with the allowance system, for they preferred that crossing the finish line first, much as in foot and horse races, should suffice to win the contest. As a result, both ratings and “one-design" competition were developed.

Ratings systems rely upon some formulaic analysis of usually very specific yacht-design parameters such as length, sail area, displacement, and hull shape. During the 1920s and through the 1970s the Cruising Club of America established a formula by which most racing/cruising boats were designed during that period. After its descendant, the mathematically complex International Offshore Rule (IOR) of the 1970s, contributed to much decreased seaworthiness (and even speed), the simpler Performance Handicap Racing Fleet (PHRF) system was adopted. The PHRF uses only proven performance characteristics, especially theoretical sailing speed, as a means to allow dissimilar yachts—typically crewed by friends and families at clubs rather than by professional crews—to race together. Most popular family-oriented cruising sailboats will have a rating filed with a local chapter of the PHRF.

The most prevalent handicap rating systems today are the Offshore Racing Congress (ORC), Offshore Racing Rule (ORR), International Rating Certificate (IRC), and the Performance Handicap Racing Fleet (PHRF). Many countries organise their own handicap systems which do not take into account the size, weight, or sail area of the yacht, but performance is measured on the basis of previous race results. The Irish E.C.H.O. system is such a handicap system.

One-design racing was invented by Thomas (Ben) Middleton in 1886 in Killiney Bay close to Dublin City, Republic of Ireland. Middleton was concerned that winning a yacht race was more reliant on having an expensive new yacht, than it was on the skill of the yachtsman. One design yacht racing is conducted with classes of similar boats, all built—often via mass-production—to the same design, with the same sail area and rig, and the same number of crew, so that crew ability and tactical expertise are more likely to decide a race than boat type, or age, or even weather. Popular racing boats such as The Water Wag, Laser, the J/22 and J/24, the Etchells, and the Star and New York 30 of Nathanael Herreshoff are examples of one-design boats.

In general, modern yacht-racing contests are conducted according to the Racing Rules of Sailing, first established in 1928. Though complex, the RRS are intended primarily simply ensure fairness and safety. The Rules are revised and updated every four years by the body now known as World Sailing.

Some yacht-racing rules give "line honours" to the first boat to cross the finish line and "handicap honours" to the corrected time winner, which may be a slower boat with a lower handicap.

== Notable races ==
The major races of today can be classified as inshore, offshore, ocean, and around the world. They adhere to one set of rules, but use diverse handicapping standards.

=== Inshore ===
The Admiral's Cup was created in 1957 by the Admiral of the Royal Ocean Racing Club. Each country involved is allowed to send one team and three boats of a chosen one-design class. Formerly it was raced every two years. It appears that due to international disagreements that this event no longer takes place.

The America's Cup was established in 1851. This is the oldest, and arguably the most prestigious, event in yacht racing. Participants are restricted to a measurement formula for the boats, and the rules concerning this formula have been controversial since the beginning. The English, who were the challengers for the first 132 years of the race, commented "England rules the waves, but America waives the rules." This race was not traditionally an inshore race, due to the requirement that the British boat would sail to the racing area, which involved sailing trans-Atlantically.

The Auckland Anniversary Regatta was founded in 1840. It includes the Heather Cup, which has been contested on over 170 yearly occasions since establishment. (It was halted briefly during the Second Boer War.)

The Blue Ribbon Round the Lake Balaton Race (called Kékszalag in Hungarian) is held on Lake Balaton in Hungary. The race circumnavigates the lake, starting and finishing in Balatonfüred, for a distance traveled of 155 km. The course is the longest among the main European round-the-lake events. The race is Europe's oldest existing round-the-lake competition. (It has been held since 1934, whereas the Bol d’Or Mirabaud on Lake Geneva has been held since 1939, and the Centomiglia on Lake Garda has been held since 1951.)

The Barcolana is a historic international sailing regatta organized by the Sailing Club of Barcola and Grignano (Società Velica di Barcola e Grignano). It takes place every year in the Gulf of Trieste on the second Sunday of October. It is one of the most crowded regattas in the world. It became a Guinness World Record holder in February 2019, when it was named "the greatest sailing race" with 2,689 boats and over 16,000 sailors on the starting line.

=== Offshore ===
The Vic-Maui Yacht Race runs from Victoria, Canada to Lahaina, Hawaii — a distance of 2,308 nautical miles ((4,274 km)). The race was started in 1965 and is held every other year. It is the longest of the Pacific-Hawaii races.

The Transpacific Yacht Race (Transpac) starts off Point Fermin (San Pedro, near Los Angeles) and ends off Diamond Head Lighthouse in Honolulu — a distance of around 2,225 nautical miles (2,560 mi; 4,121 km). It is one of yachting's premier offshore races, attracting entrants from all over the world. Started in 1906, the race is organized by the Transpacific Yacht Club.

Fastnet was established in 1924 with 7 boats. The race covers approximately 600 miles starting at Cowes on the Isle of Wight, rounding Fastnet rock on the southern coast of Ireland, and finishing at Cherbourg, France. Until 2019, the race finished at Plymouth.

The Tour De France A La Voile was established in 1978 with 20 boats. The race parallels the cycling event and takes place along France's three coasts: English Channel, Atlantic Ocean, and the Mediterranean. It covers over 1000 miles.

The Sydney to Hobart Yacht Race was established in 1945. This Australian race runs from Sydney to Hobart, Tasmania — a distance of over 682 nautical miles (1,263 km; 785 mi).

The Newport to Bermuda race started in 1906. It runs from Newport, Rhode Island to Bermuda.

The Chicago Yacht Club Race to Mackinac was founded in 1898 with five boats. The race runs over 300 miles, from Chicago to Mackinac Island on the northern tip of the lower peninsula of Michigan.

The Marblehead to Halifax race was founded in 1905. The race runs for over 360 miles, from Marblehead, Massachusetts to Halifax, Nova Scotia.

The Coastal Classic, started in 1982, is held in New Zealand. At about 125 miles, it is shorter than most offshore races. It runs north from Auckland to Russell, which is at the northern tip of New Zealand's North Island.

=== Oceanic ===
Ostar was organised by the Royal Western Yacht Club and first held in 1960. The Ostar runs from Plymouth to Newport (in 1960 the finish line was in New York). It is a single-handed race against the prevailing wind and current in the North Atlantic. The race is held every 4 years but has become an amateur race in the early 21st century. Originally, the Ostar was the main race for offshore sailors, but has meanwhile lost its status to the Route du Rhum. The race covers about 3,000 miles.

Route du Rhum was established in 1978. This race happens every four years, starting in November. It is primarily a single-handed race, but crewed boats do compete. It starts at France's north coast and runs to Guadeloupe, a French Island in the Caribbean. The race covers about 3700 miles.

Mini Transat started in 1977 and runs every two years. This is a singlehanded race that crosses the Atlantic on a similar route as the Route Du Rhum. This race is broken up into two legs, the first going from France to the Canary Islands and the second to Guadeloupe Island in the Caribbean.

The South Atlantic Race was established in 1971 as "Cape to Rio" with over 50 entries. The race runs from Cape Town, South Africa to Rio de Janeiro — some 3600 miles.

The Round Ireland Yacht Race is held bi-annually. Running approximately 704 miles, it starts and finishes in Wicklow, and includes all the offshore islands except Rockall.

=== Around-the-world ===
- The Ocean Race – formerly known as The Volvo Ocean Race as well as the Whitbread Round the World Race, it started in 1973/74. This race is one of the pinnacles of yacht racing, mostly professionally crewed. Originally a four leg race constituting 27,930 miles, it is now a nine leg race.
- Velux 5 Oceans Race – formerly known as the BOC Challenge and later the Around Alone, this race started in 1982 with 17 entries. It is a single-handed race around the world, originally with four legs but now with three.
- Global Challenge – this race was established in 1992/93 by Scottish sailing icon Sir Chay Blythe, the first person to sail around the world alone against the prevailing winds and currents. This is what makes this race unique, participants "beat" their way against the sea which makes for very uncomfortable, but safer, sailing conditions than sailing downwind. The race is sailed in one-design boats that are designed and built specifically for the race. The crews cannot be professional, and are made up of novice sailors who pay for a berth.
- Vendée Globe – this race, known as the "Everest of the Seas" for its difficulty, started 26 November 1989 with 13 entries. It is a single handed, non-stop, without assistance race. The first race took 120 days, and only 7 finished.
- Jules Verne Trophy – established in 1993, this was designed to be a race against the clock, not other boats. Participants can start any time, have any design and any number of crew. The only two rules are tostart and finish at the Ile d’Ouessant, and to complete the journey under 80 days.
- Clipper Round the World Yacht Race – established by Sir Robin Knox-Johnston, the first man to perform a single-handed non-stop circumnavigation of the globe, the first Clipper race took place in 1996. The race is sailed in a fleet of 12 one-design boats that are designed and built specifically for the race. Each yacht is crewed by a professional skipper and paying novice sailors. It is the longest yacht race, with multiple stopovers and taking 11 months to complete the circumnavigation.
- Barcelona World Race – double-handed (two-crew) non-stop sailing around the world on IMOCA Open 60 yachts and organized by Fundació Navegació Oceànica Barcelona.

== See also ==
- Antarctica Cup Yacht Race
