= 29er World Championship =

International sailing regatta

- Most recent edition or competition: 2025 29er World Championship
- First held: 2000
- Class: 29er
- Champions: (Norway) Nicklas Holt & Philip Forslund

The 29er World Championship is an annual international sailing regatta for 29ers, organized by the host club on behalf of the International 29er Class Association and recognized by World Sailing, the sports IOC recognized governing body.

== Events ==
Host clubs of the World Championship
European hosts of the World Championship

Editions			Host			Sailors			Boats				Ref.
No.	Date	Year	Host club	Location	Nat.	Tot	Nat	Con	No.			Mix	Ref.
1	17-23 Jul	2000	Fraglia Vela Riva	Riva del Garda	Italy	116	14	5	58	48	5	5	
2	14-20 Jul	2001	Canadian Olympic-training Regatta, Kingston	Portsmouth Olympic Harbour, Kingston, Ontario	Canada	128	9	6	64	45	5	14	
3	29 Dec 2002 - 4 Jan 2003	2002		Sydney	Australia	206	12	6	103	72	9	22	
4	11-17 Jul	2003	Real Club Nautico de Laredo	Laredo, Cantabria	Spain	112	12	4	56	38	7	11	
5	21-28 Aug	2004		Lake Silvaplana	Switzerland	168	12	4	84	51	10	23	
6	3-10 Jul	2005	St. Francis Yacht Club	Berkeley, San Francisco, California	United States	156	11	6	78	59	10	9	
7	23-28 Jul	2006	Weymouth and Portland National Sailing Academy	isle of Portland	United Kingdom	210	17	5	105	69	15	21	
8	21-27 Jan	2007	Club Náutico San Isidro	San Isidro, Buenos Aires	Argentina	100	11	6	50	35	5	8	
9	4-9 Jan	2008	Sorrento Sailing Couta Boat Club	Sorrento, Victoria	Australia	204	13	6	102	74	15	13	
10	18-25 Jul	2009	Fraglia Vela Riva	Riva del Garda	Italy	370	21	5	185				
11	4-9 Jan	2010	Grand Bahama Sailing Club	Freeport	Bahamas	70	11	4	35	22	11	2	
12	3-8 Jan	2011	Club Náutico Mar del Plata	Mar del Plata	Argentina	120	12	4	60	45	4	11	
13	23 - 28 Jul	2012	Travemünde Woche	Travemünde, Lübeck	Germany	432	23	6	216				
14	28 Jul - 2 Aug	2013	Kaløvig Sailing Club	Aarhus	Denmark	426	25	6	213		35		
15	26 Jul - 2 Aug	2014	CORK–Kingston; Portsmouth Olympic Harbour / Sail Kingston	Kingston, Ontario	Canada	202	14	5	101	69	17	15	
16	9 -14 Aug	2015	Pwllheli Sailing Club	Pwllheli, Wales	United Kingdom	386	25	6	193	129	40	24	
17	25 - 30 Jul	2016	Regatta Center Medemblik	Medemblik	Netherlands	456	29	5	228	139	63	26	
18	29 Jul - 5 Aug	2017	Alamitos Bay Yacht Club	Long Beach, California	United States	258	17	6	129	87	26	16	
19	30 Dec 2017- 8 Jan 2018	2018	Royal Hong Kong Yacht Club	Hong Kong	Hong Kong	116	14	4	58	45	5	8	
20	26 Jul - 3 Aug	2019		Gdynia	Poland	350	27	5	175	103	58	14	
~~21~~	13 - 21 Aug	2020	Weymouth and Portland National Sailing Academy	Isle of Portland	United Kingdom	Cancelled due to COVID-19 pandemic in the United Kingdom							
21	21 - 31 Aug	2021	Real Club Náutico de Valencia	Valencia	Spain	378	24	3	189	112	54	23	
22	29 Jul - 5 Aug	2022	Club Nautico El Balís	Sant Andreu de Llavaneres, Barcelona	Spain	484	26	5	242	132	66	44	
23	27 Jul - 3 Aug	2023	Weymouth and Portland National Sailing Academy	Isle of Portland	United Kingdom	410	25	6	205	116	52	37	
24	1 - 8 Aug	2024	Aarhus Sejlklub	Aarhus	Denmark	516	27	5	258	126	81	51	
25	1 - 8 Aug	2025	Marina da Afurada	Vila Nova de Gaia	Portugal	404	26	4	202	104	57	41	
26	4 – 9 July	2026	Kieler Yacht-Club	Kiel	Germany	552	35	4	276				
27	3 – 10 July	2027	Marseille Marina	Marseille	France								

== Medalists ==
Year	Gold	Silver	Bronze	Ref.
2000; Italy	New Zealand; Mike Bassett; Mark Kennedy	Australia; Evan McNicol; John Winning	New Zealand; Scott Kennedy; Lindsay Kennedy	
2001; Canada	Great Britain; John Pink; Tom Weeks	Great Britain; John Gimson; Simon Marks	Australia; Joseph Turner; Charles Dorron	
2002; Australia	Australia; John Winning; Evan McNicol	Australia; Nathan Outteridge; Grant Rose	Australia; Jonathan Bonnitcha; Paul Bonnitcha	
2003; Spain	Great Britain; David Evans; Rick Peacock	Argentina; Pepe Bettini; Federico Villambrosa	Great Britain; Thomas Smedley; Stevie Wilson	
2004; Switzerland	Great Britain; Tristan Jaques; Alain Sign	Finland; Lauri Lehtinen; Miikka Pennanen	Australia; David O'Connor; Scott Babbage	
2005; United States	Australia; Jacqui Bonnitcha; Euan McNicol	Australia; David O'Connor; Scott Babbage	United States; John Heineken; Matt Noble	
2006; Great Britain	Finland; Silja Lehtinen; Scott Babbage	Great Britain; Dylan Fletcher; Rob Partridge	United States; Cameron Biehl; Matt Noble	
2007; Argentina	Argentina; Matías Gainza; Federico Villambrosa	Argentina; Pepe Bettini; Matías Keller	Argentina; Ignacio Fernández Besada; Tigris Martirosjan	
2008; Australia	Australia; Steve Thomas; Jasper Warren	Australia; Byron White; William Ryan	Great Britain; Max Richardson; Alex Groves	
2009; Italy	Australia; Steve Thomas; Blair Tuke	Australia; Lauren Jeffies; Nathan Outteridge	Australia; Haylee Outteridge; Iain Jensen	
2010; Bahamas	France; Kevin Fisher; Glen Gouron	Argentina; Pepe Bettini; Fernando Gwozdz	Italy; Lorenzo Franceschini; Ricardo Camin	
2011; Argentina	Argentina; María Belén Tavella; Franco Greggi	Argentina; Pepe Bettini; Fernando Gwozdz	Argentina; Francisco Cosentino; Tomás Wagmáister	
2012; Germany	Spain; Carlos Robles; Florián Trittel	France; Lucas Rual; Kevin Fischer	Argentina; Klaus Lange; Mateo Majdalani	
2013; Denmark	France; Lucas Rual; Émile Amoros	New Zealand; Markus Somerville; Jack Simpson	Spain; Martí Llena; Oriol Mahiques	
2014 Canada	Australia; Kurt Hansen; Harry Morton	France; Brice Yrieix; Loic Ficher-Guillou	Germany; Jasper Steffens; Tom Lennart Brauckmann	
2015; Great Britain	Australia; Kyle O'Connell; Tom Siganto	Argentina; Ignacio Varisco; Federico García	United States; Christopher Williford; Wade Waddell	
2016; Netherlands	Australia; Tom Crockett; Harry Morton	France; Gwendal Nael; Lilian Mercier	Great Britain; Crispin Beaumont; Tom Darling	
2017; United States	South Africa; Benji Daniel; Alex Burger	France; Benjamin Jaffrezic; Léo Chauvel	France; Théo Revil; Gautier Guevel	
2018; Hong Kong	New Zealand; Francesco Kayrouz; Jackson Keon	Australia; Lachie Brewer; Max Paul	France; Benjamin Jaffrezic; Léo Chauvel	
2019; Poland	France; Aristide Girou; Noah Chauvin	United States; Stephan Baker; Ripley Shelley	Sweden; Alice Moss; Carl Hörfelt	
2020; Great Britain	Cancelled due to COVID-19 pandemic			
2021; Spain	Spain; Mateo Codoñer; Simón Codoñer	Spain; Quicorras Urios; Filippo Binetti	Denmark; Jens-Christian Dehn-Toftehøj; Jens-Philip Dehn-Toftehøj	
2022; Spain	Argentina; Máximo Videla; Tadeo Funes	Italy; Alex Demurtas; Giovanni Santi	France; Hugo Revil; Karl Devaux	
2023; Great Britain	Ireland; Clementine Van Steenberge; Nathan Van Steenberge	Argentina; Máximo Videla; Juan Cruz Albamonte	Italy; Alex Demurtas; Giovanni Santi	
2024; Denmark	Italy; Alex Demurtas; Giovanni Santi	Poland; Ewa Lewandowska; Krzysztof Królik	France; Jocelyn Le Goff; Jules Vidor	
2025; Portugal	Norway; Nicklas Holt; Philip Forslund	France; Jocelyn Le Goff; Jules Vidor	France; Nolann Huet des Aunay; Titouan Gresset	
2026; Germany	France; Alexandre Mostini; Raphaël Allain	Sweden; Henric Wigforss; William Drakenberg	Argentina; Félix Llauro; Lucas Cózar	
