= Gimlet =

Gimlet may refer to:

== Arts, entertainment, and media ==
- Gimlet Media, a media network that produces journalistic and narrative podcasts
- Gimlet (Transformers), a fictional character
- Captain Lorrington "Gimlet" King, a fictional character in a series of novels by W. E. Johns

== Places ==
=== United Kingdom ===
- Gimlet Rock, Wales, United Kingdom

=== United States ===
- Gimlet, Idaho, an unincorporated town in the United States
- Gimlet, Kentucky, an unincorporated town in the United States
- Gimlet Bridge, a Pegram truss bridge in Idaho, United States
- Gimlet Creek (Missouri), United States
- Gimlet Creek (South Dakota), United States

== Technology ==
- Gimlet (rocket), an air-to-air unguided rocket
- Gimlet (tool), a hand tool for drilling small holes
- SA-16 Gimlet, a surface-to-air missile

== Other uses ==
- Gimlet (cocktail), a cocktail typically made of gin or vodka and lime juice
- Gimlet (eucalypt), Eucalyptus (plant) in the series Contortae
- Gimlet (restaurant)
- 21st Infantry Regiment (United States), a unit in the United States Army that is nicknamed Gimlets
