= List of Olympic venues in sailing =

For the Summer Olympics, there are 32 venues that have been or will be used for sailing. Most competitions took place for the early part of the Olympics at or near venues, but no specific yacht or sailing club was listed in the official Olympic report. In 1920, the twelve-foot dinghy event set for Ostend was moved to the Netherlands at special request of the Belgian Olympic Committee. The first specific yacht or sailing club to host the competitions took place in 1968 Summer Olympics in Mexico City though those competitions took place actually in Acapulco. Eight years later in Montreal, the competitions took place on the Great Lakes in Kingston, Ontario, marking the first and only time the sailing competitions took place in freshwater.

During the fifth race of the 1988 Summer Olympic sailing Finn event near Busan, Canada's Lawrence Lemieux was in second place when he noticed Joseph Chan of Singapore in the water 25 yd (23 m) from his capsized boat. Lemieux abandoned his position and rescued Chan and Chan's Singapore teammate. Even though Lemieux finished last in the race, the IOC gave him second place for the race as a result of Lemieux's heroic efforts. Lemieux would be awarded the IOC Pierre de Coubertin medal at the Finn medal awards ceremony by President Juan Antonio Samaranch.

The 1992 Summer Olympic venue was noted for its numerous complaints from the sailors over the debris found at the Olympic Harbor. Among the items found were dead rats and floating refrigerators. It was so bad that Barcelona port authorities, under pressure from the International Yacht Racing Union (later International Sailing Federation, now World Sailing since 2015), assigned four garbage vessels to collect garbage daily. In the men's windsurfer event, American Mike Gebhardt got a plastic bag caught on his boardsail in the last lap of the seventh race. Six boardsailers passed Gebhardt before he could dislodge the plastic bag. Gebhardt lost out a gold by 0.4 points over France's Franck David.

Games	Venue	Other sports at venues for those games	Capacity	Ref.
1900 Paris	Le Havre	None	Not listed.	
1900 Paris	Meulan-en-Yvelines	None	Not listed.	
1908 London	Solent	None	Not listed.	
1908 London	Southampton Water	Water motorsports	Not listed.	
1912 Stockholm	Nynäshamn	None	Not listed.	
1920 Antwerp	Buiten Y (12 foot dinghy)	None	Not listed.	
1920 Antwerp	Ostend	Polo	Not listed.	
1924 Paris	Le Havre	None	541	
1924 Paris	Meulan-en-Yvelines	None	389	
1928 Amsterdam	Buiten Y	None	2,263	
1928 Amsterdam	Zuiderzee	None	2,263	
1932 Los Angeles	Los Angeles Harbor	None	Not listed.	
1936 Berlin	Kiel Bay	None	Not listed.	
1948 London	Torbay	None	Not listed.	
1952 Helsinki	Harmaja	None	Not listed.	
1952 Helsinki	Liuskasaari	None	19,000	
1956 Melbourne	Port Phillip	None	Not listed	
1960 Rome	Gulf of Naples	None	Not listed.	
1964 Tokyo	Enoshima	None	Not listed.	
1968 Mexico City	Club de Yates de Acapulco	None	Not listed.	
1972 Munich	Bay of Kiel	None	4,000 on 14 steamers who wanted to watch the action.	
1976 Montreal	Portsmouth Olympic Harbour	None	Not listed	
1980 Moscow	Olympic Regatta in Tallinn	None	Not listed	
1984 Los Angeles	Long Beach Shoreline Marina	None	Not listed.	
1988 Seoul	Busan Yachting Center	None	80	
1992 Barcelona	Olympic Harbour	None	Not listed.	
1996 Atlanta	Wassaw Sound	None	1,000	
2000 Sydney	Rushcutters Bay	None	10,000	
2004 Athens	Agios Kosmas Olympic Sailing Centre	None	8,000	
2008 Beijing	Qingdao International Sailing Centre	None	A ticketed area was created for the first time in sailing on the breakwater of the marina.	
2012 London	Weymouth and Portland National Sailing Academy	None	A ticketed spectator area was created away from the marina at Nothe Fort with a capacity of 5000 people.	
2016 Rio de Janeiro	Marina da Glória	None	10,000	
2020 Tokyo	Enoshima	None	10,000	
2024 Paris	Old Port of Marseille	None	5,000	
2028 Los Angeles	Belmont Veterans Memorial Pier	None	6,000	
2032 Brisbane	Manly Boat Harbour	None	10,000	

== Gallery of venues ==
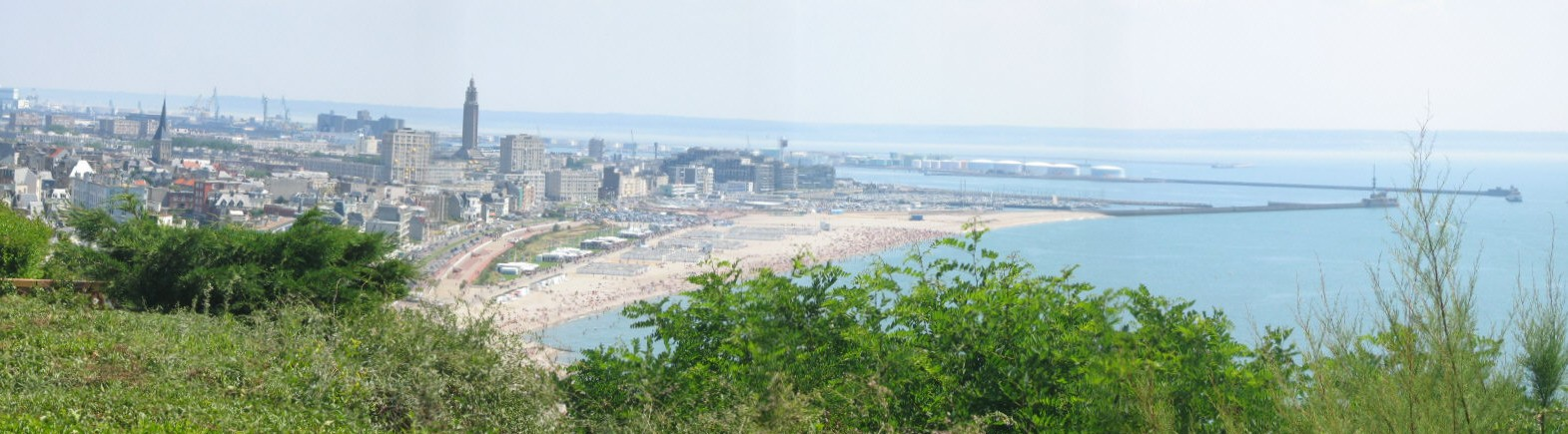
Le Havre hosted sailing at the 1900 and 1924 Summer Olympics in Paris.

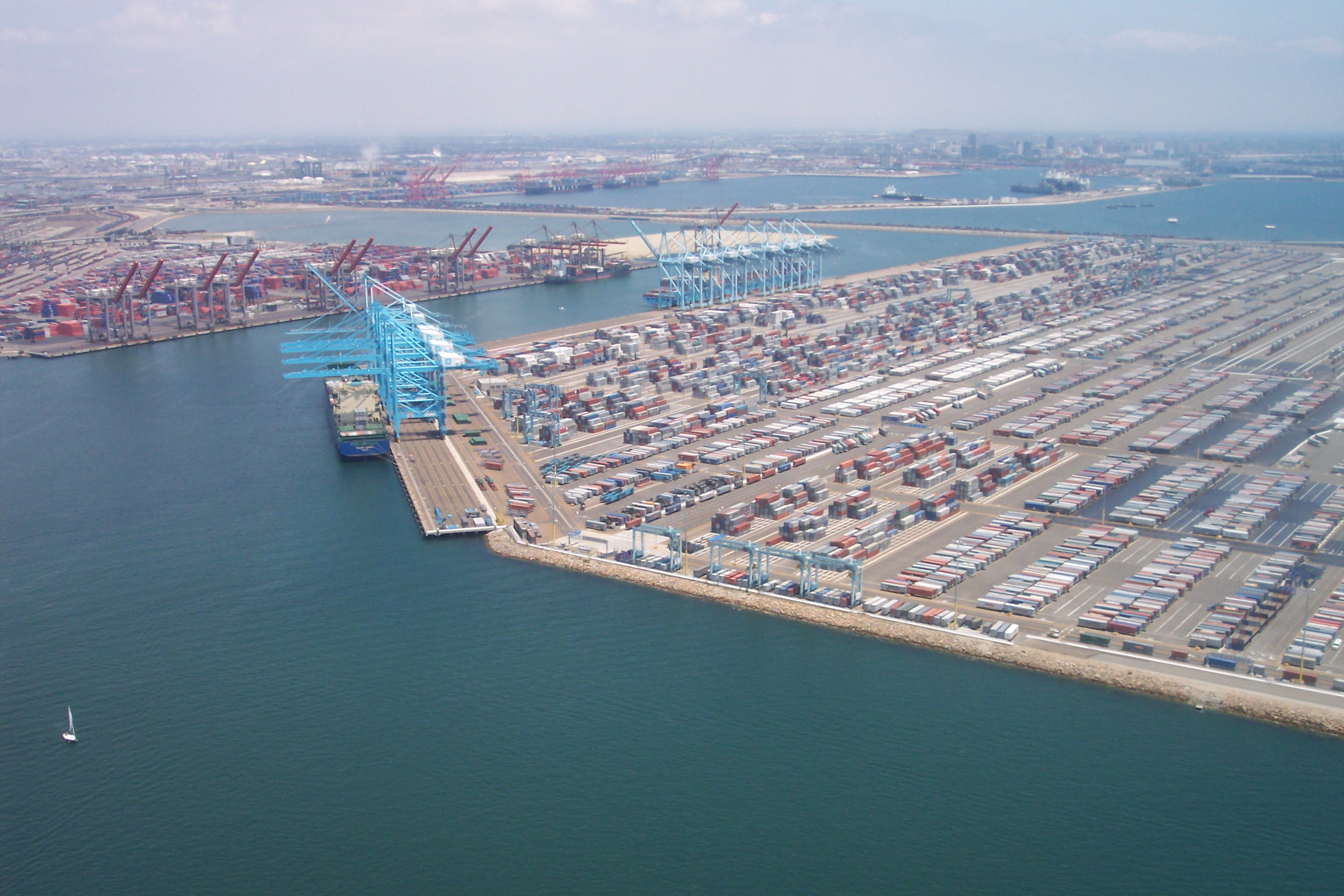
Los Angeles Harbor hosted sailing at the 1932 Summer Olympics.

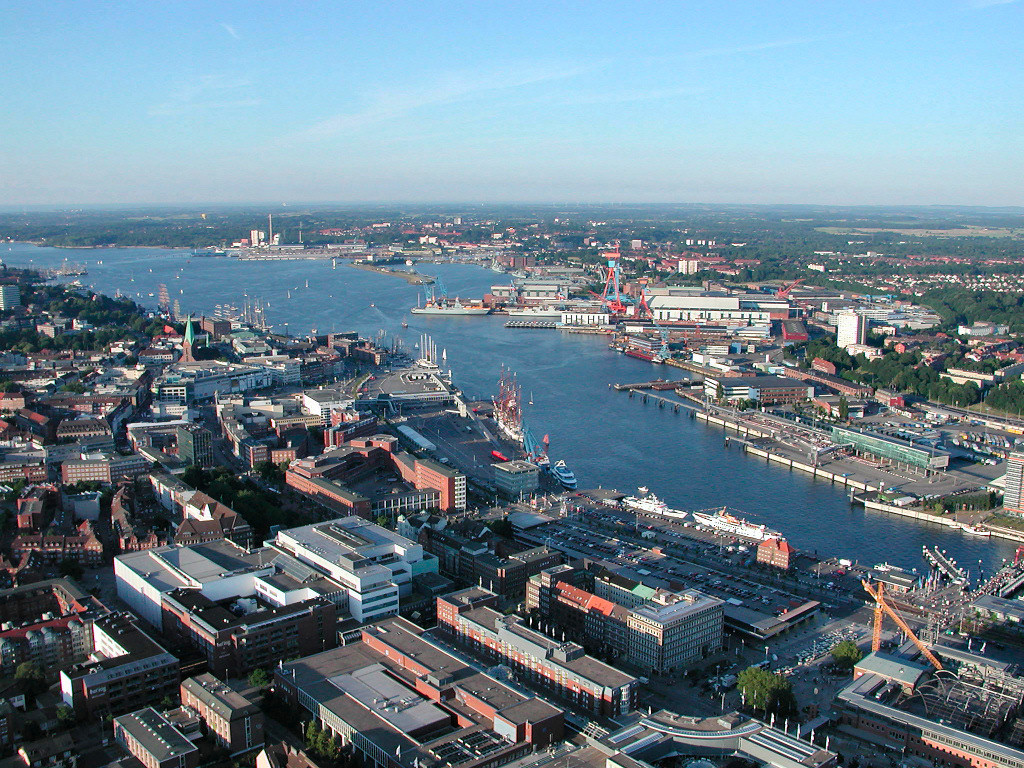
Bay of Kiel hosted the sailing at the 1936 Summer Olympics in Berlin and the 1972 Summer Olympics in Munich.

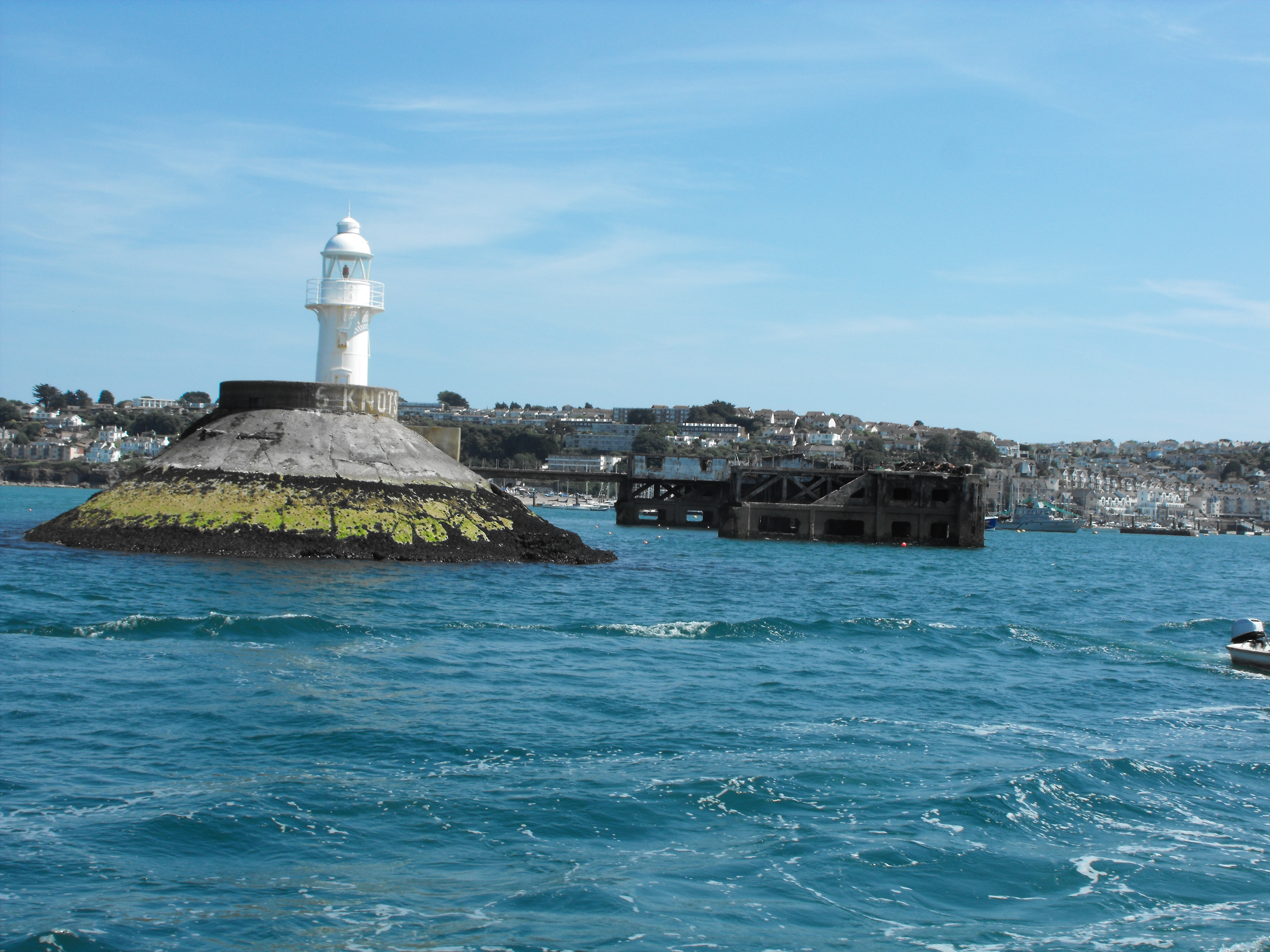
Torbay hosted sailing at the 1948 Summer Olympics in London.

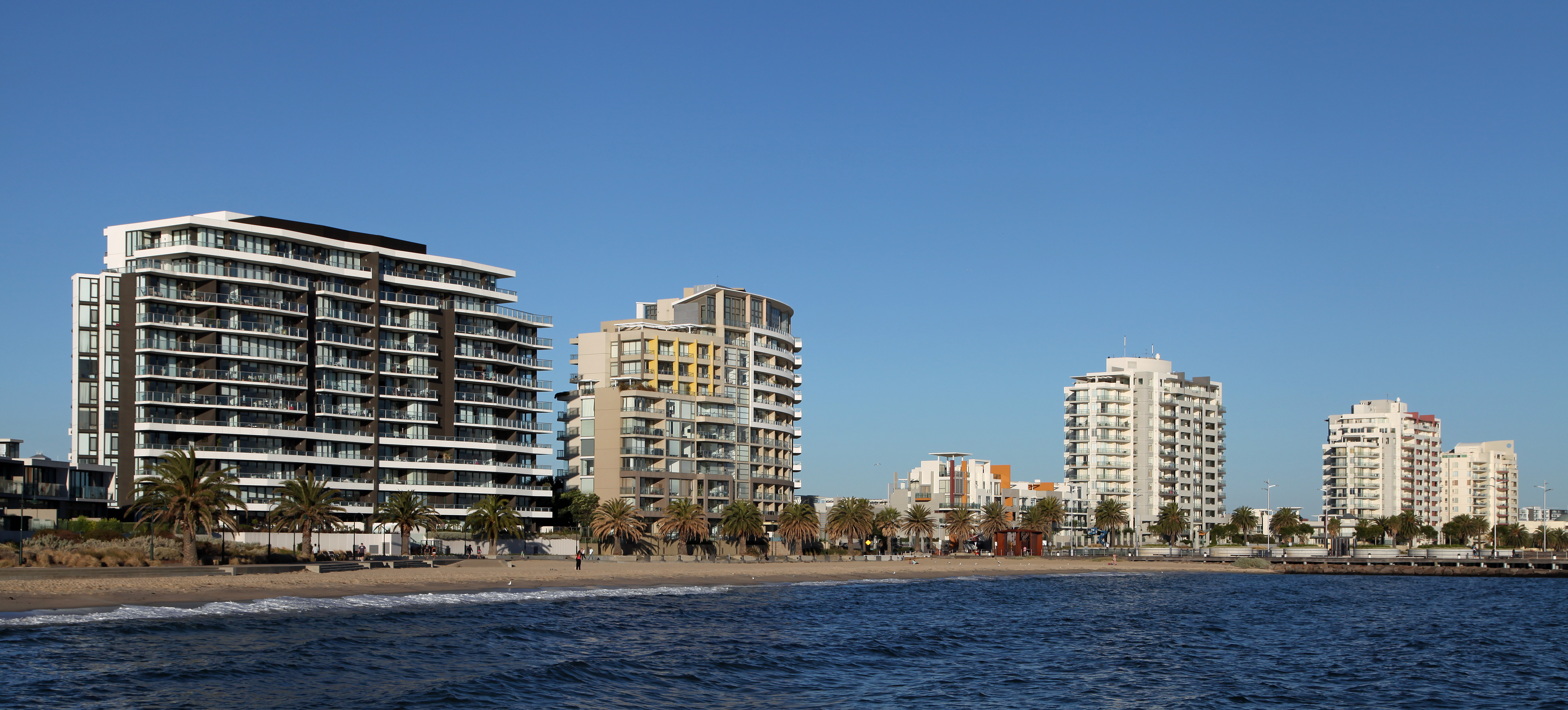
Port Phillip hosted sailing at the 1956 Summer Olympics in Melbourne.

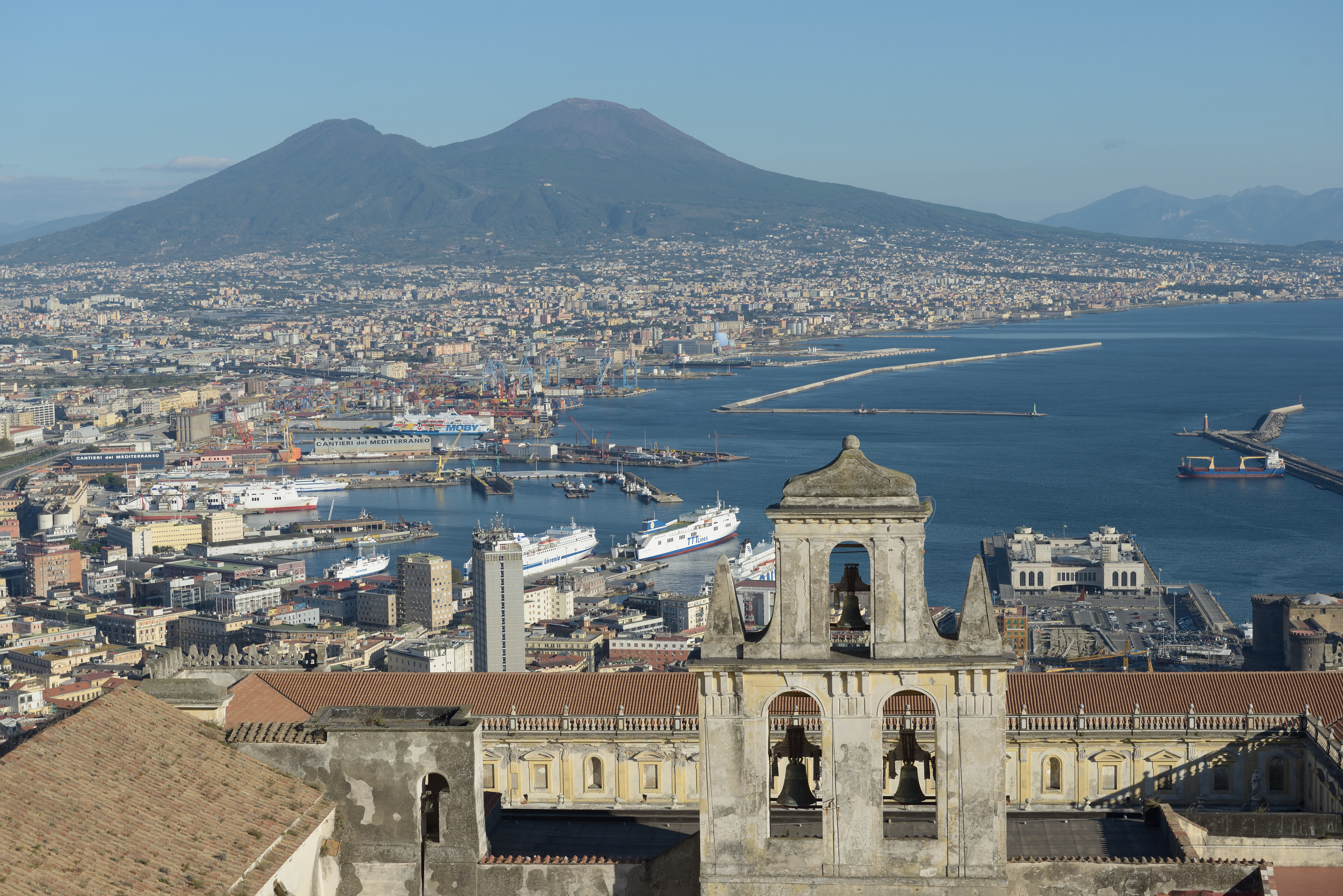
The Gulf of Naples hosted sailing for the 1960 Summer Olympics in Rome.

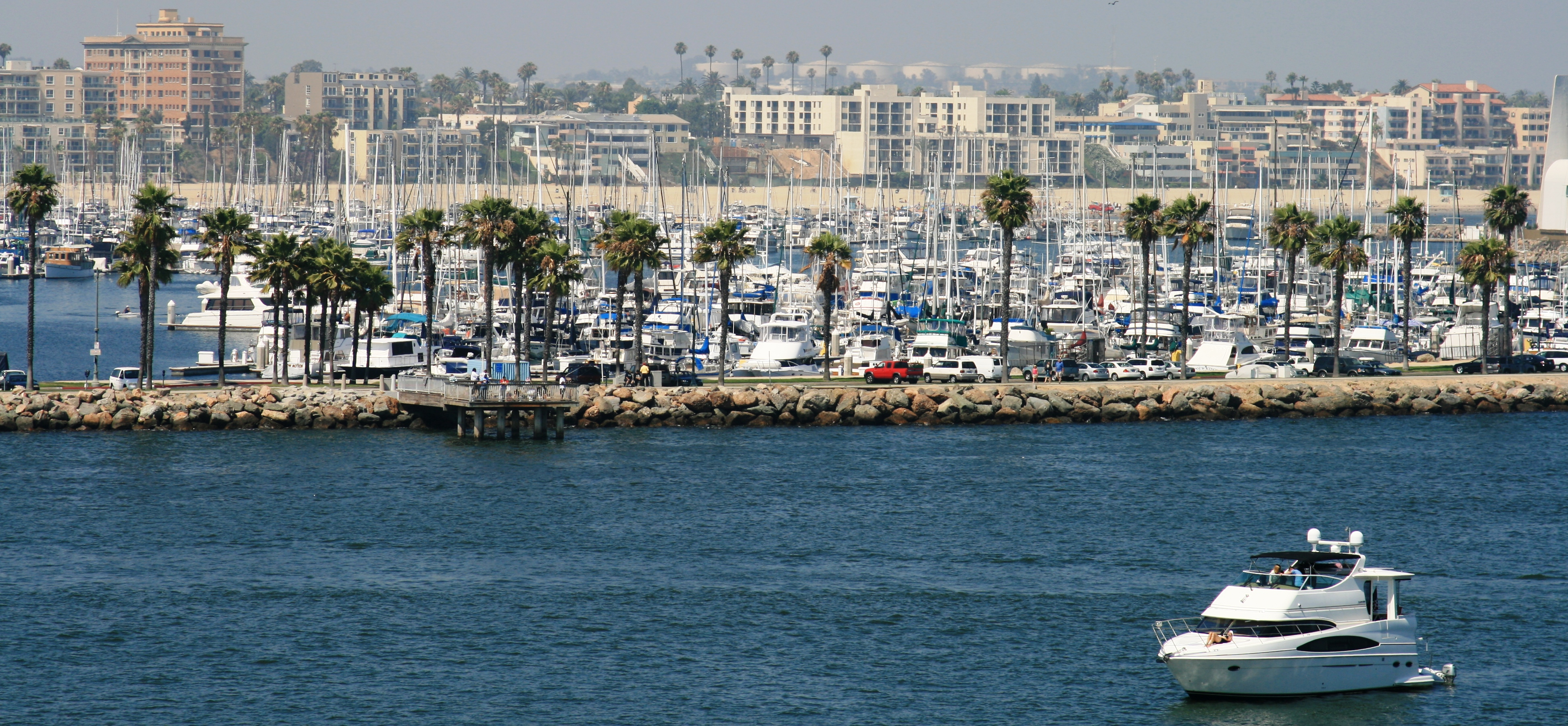
Long Beach Shoreline Marina hosted sailing at the 1984 Summer Olympics in Los Angeles.

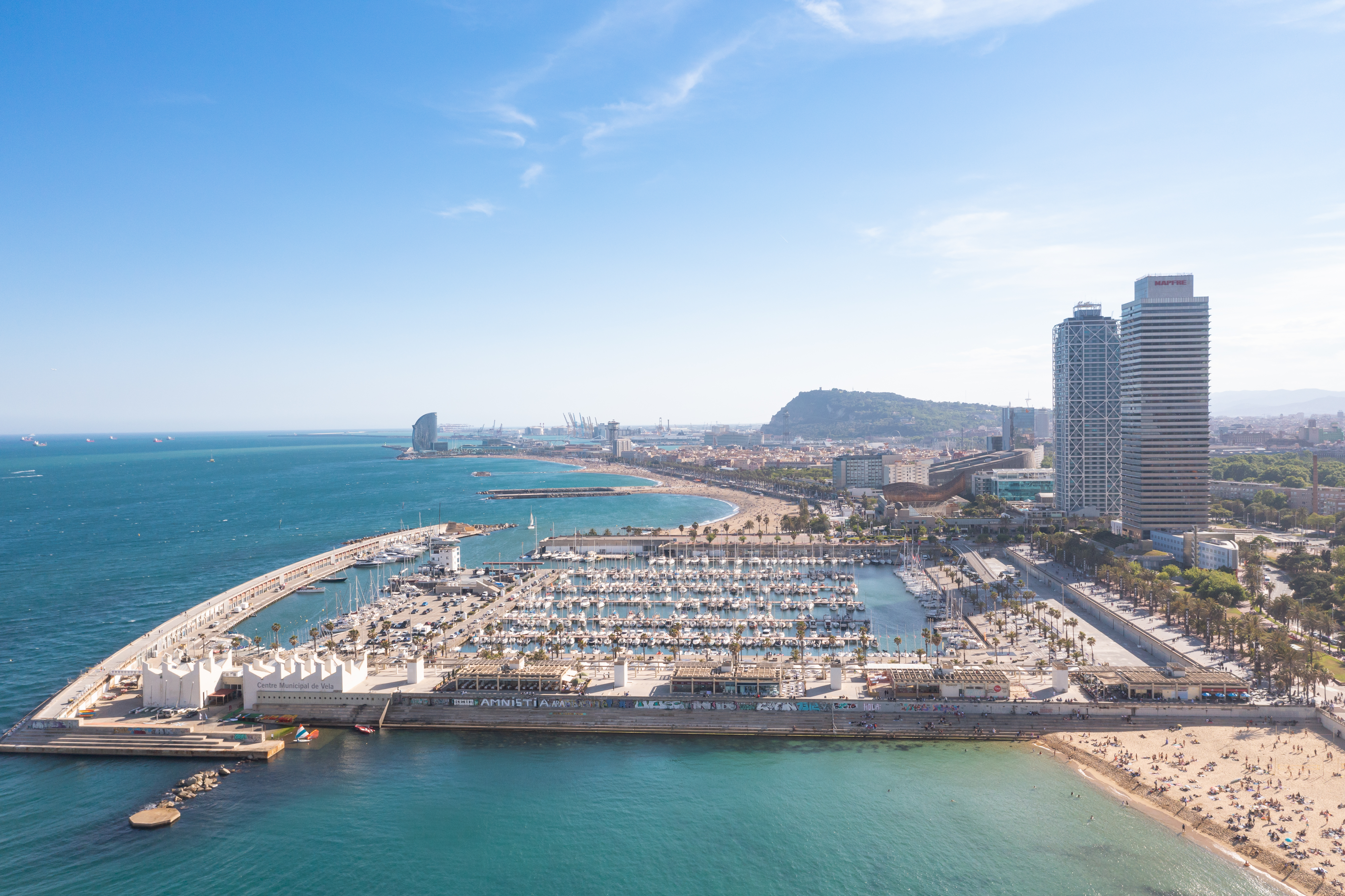
Port Olímpic hosted sailing at the 1992 Summer Olympics in Barcelona.

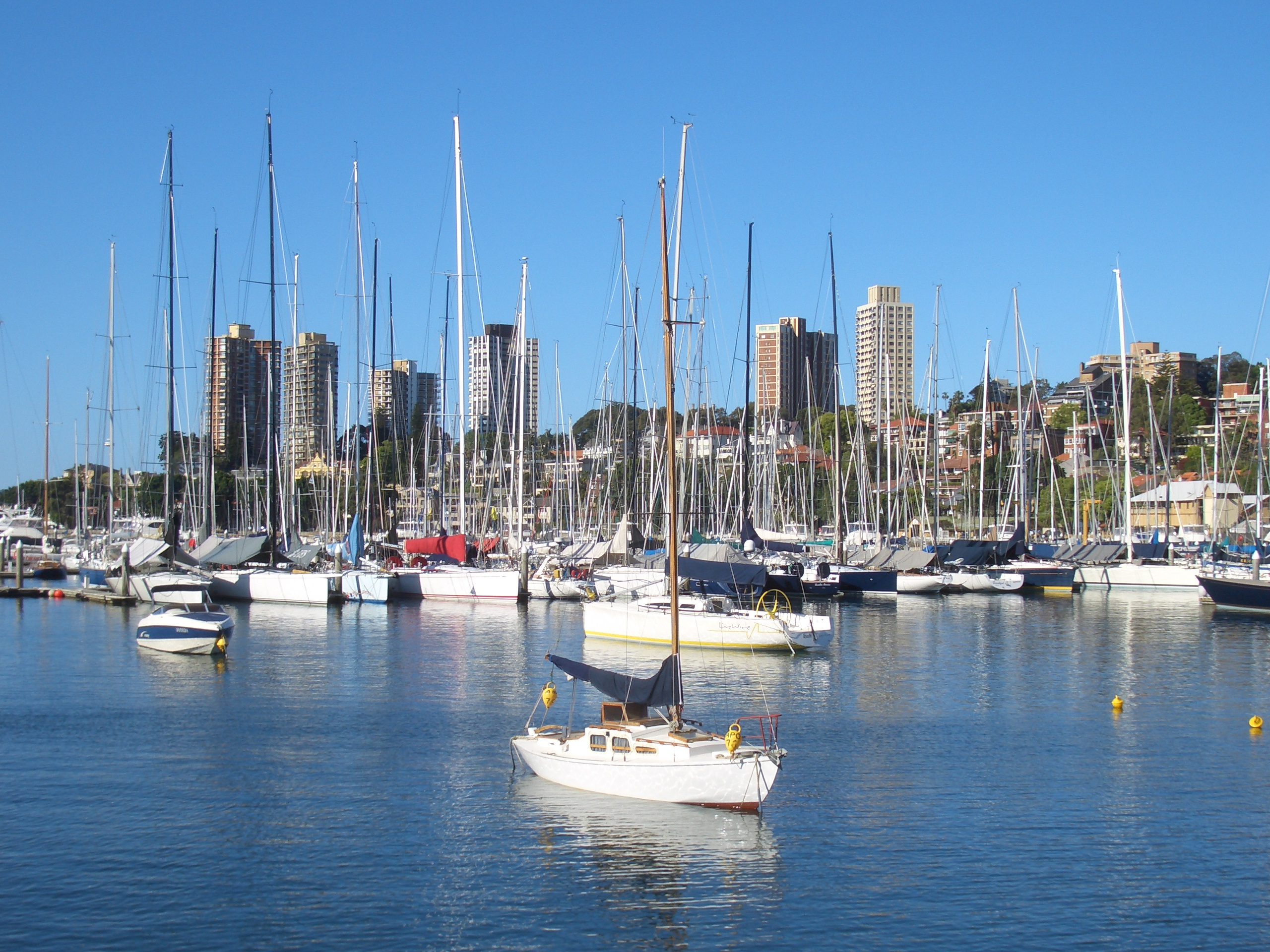
Rushcutters Bay hosted sailing at the 2000 Summer Olympics in Sydney.

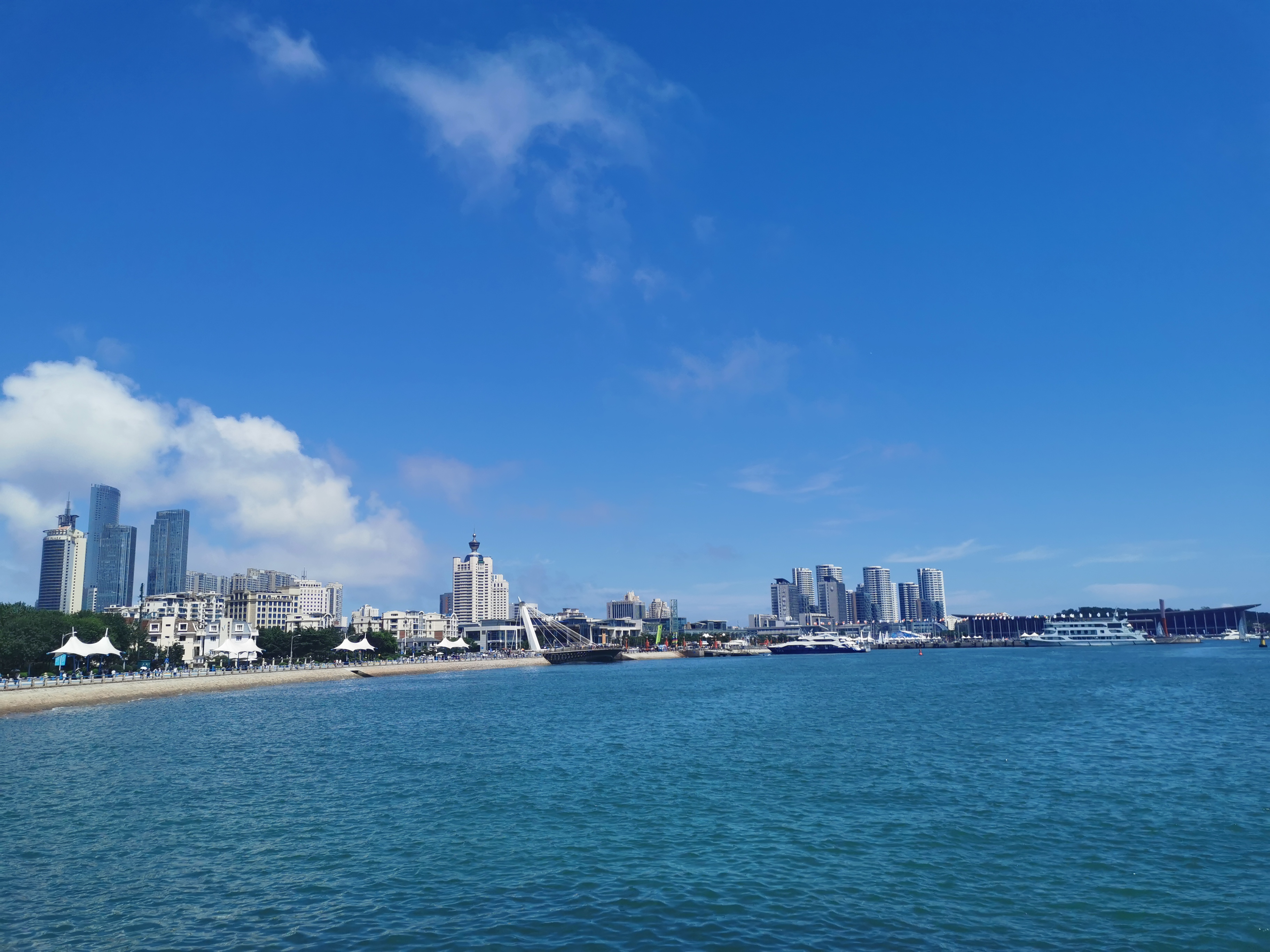
Qingdao International Sailing Centre hosted sailing at the 2008 Summer Olympics in Beijing.

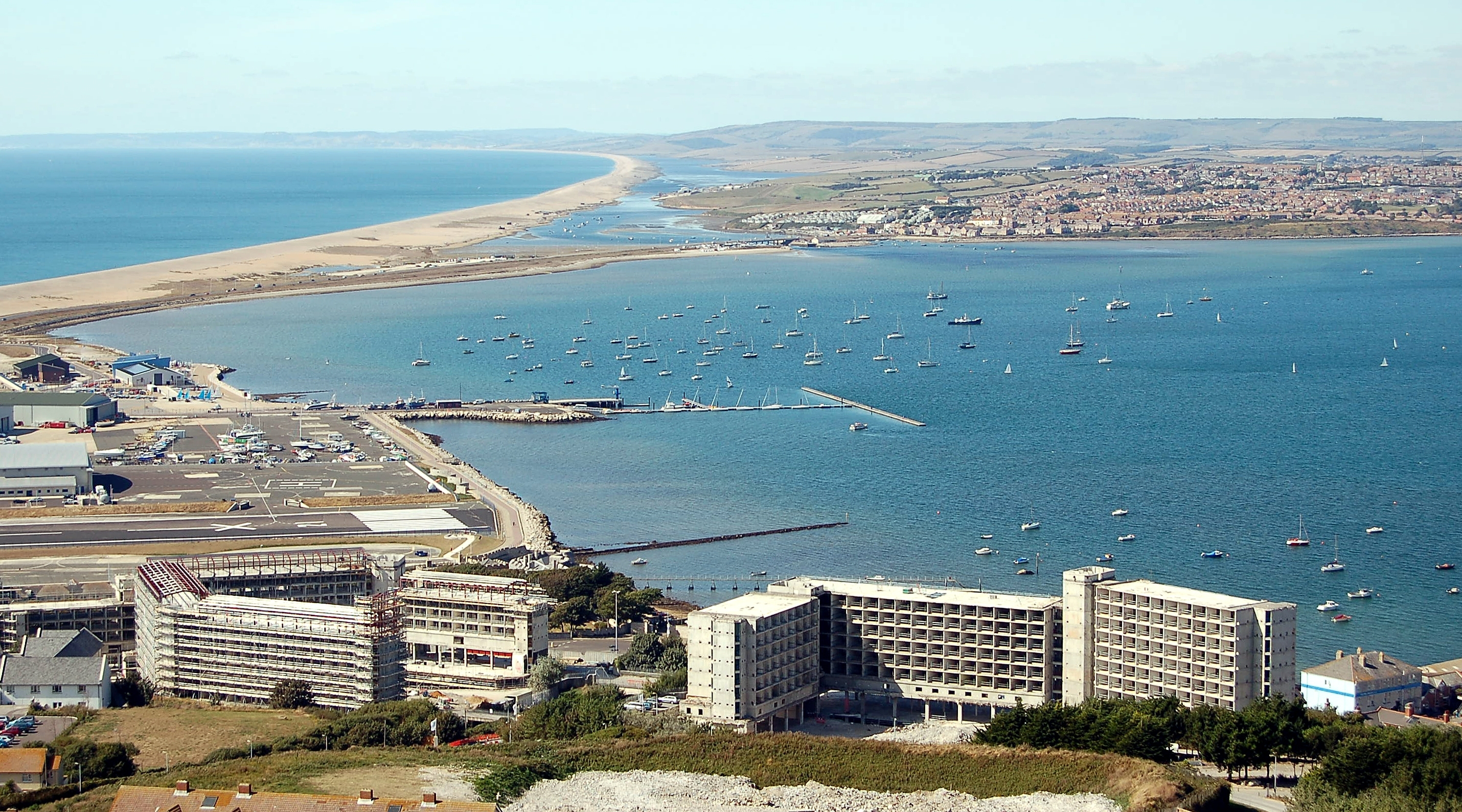
Weymouth and Portland National Sailing Academy hosted sailing at the 2012 Summer Olympics in London.

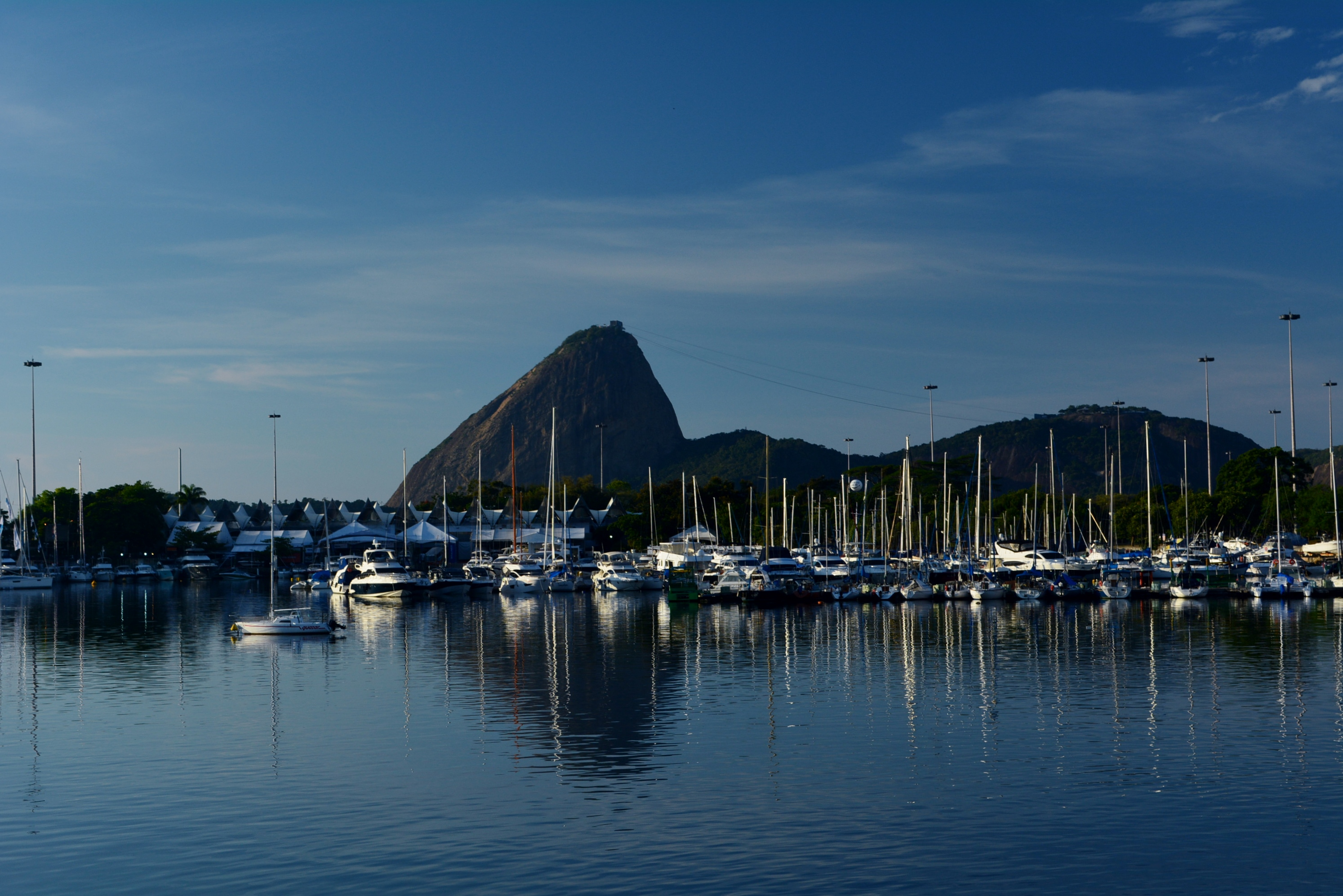
Marina da Glória hosted sailing at the 2016 Summer Olympics in Rio de Janeiro.

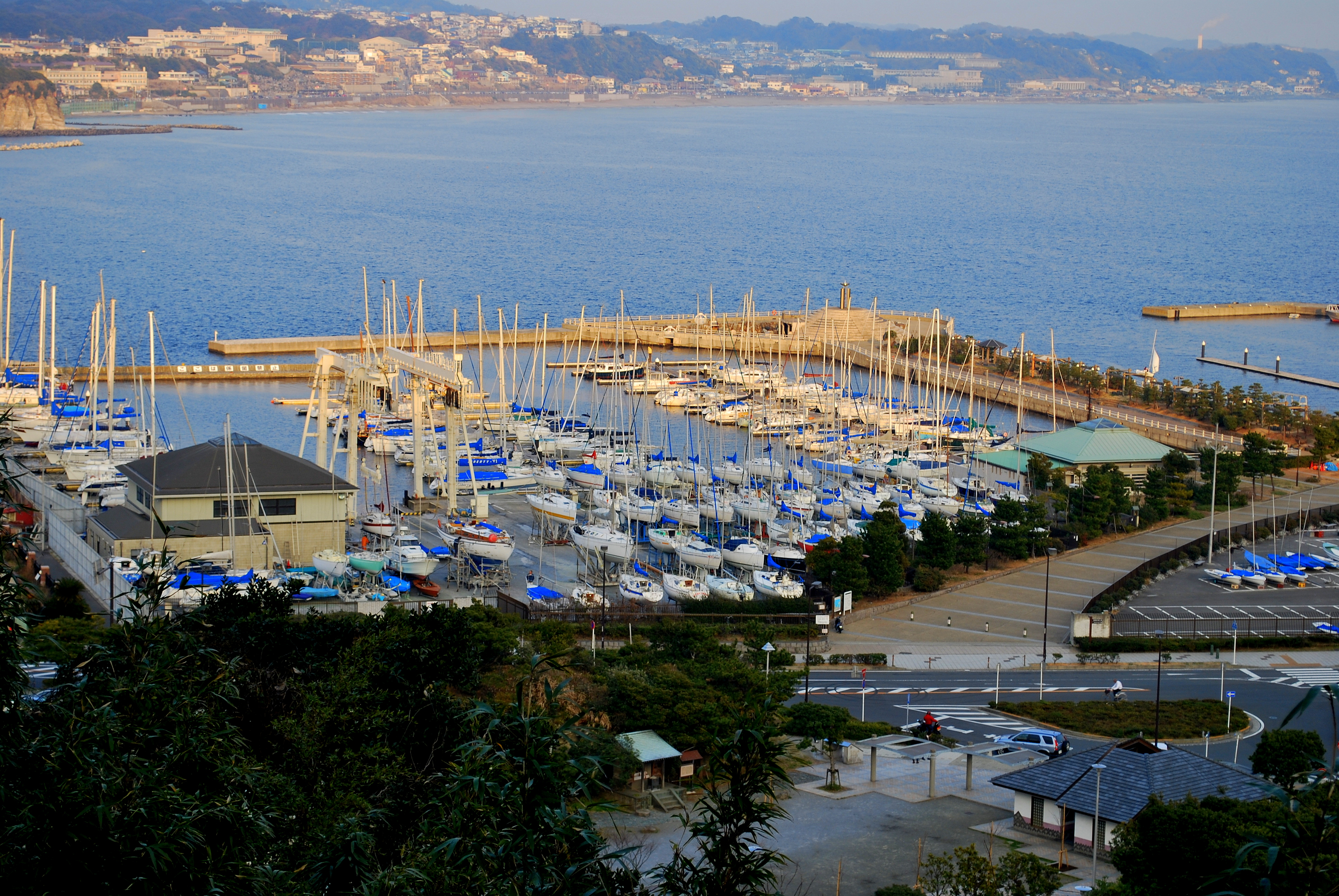
Enoshima hosted sailing at the 2020 Summer Olympics in Tokyo.

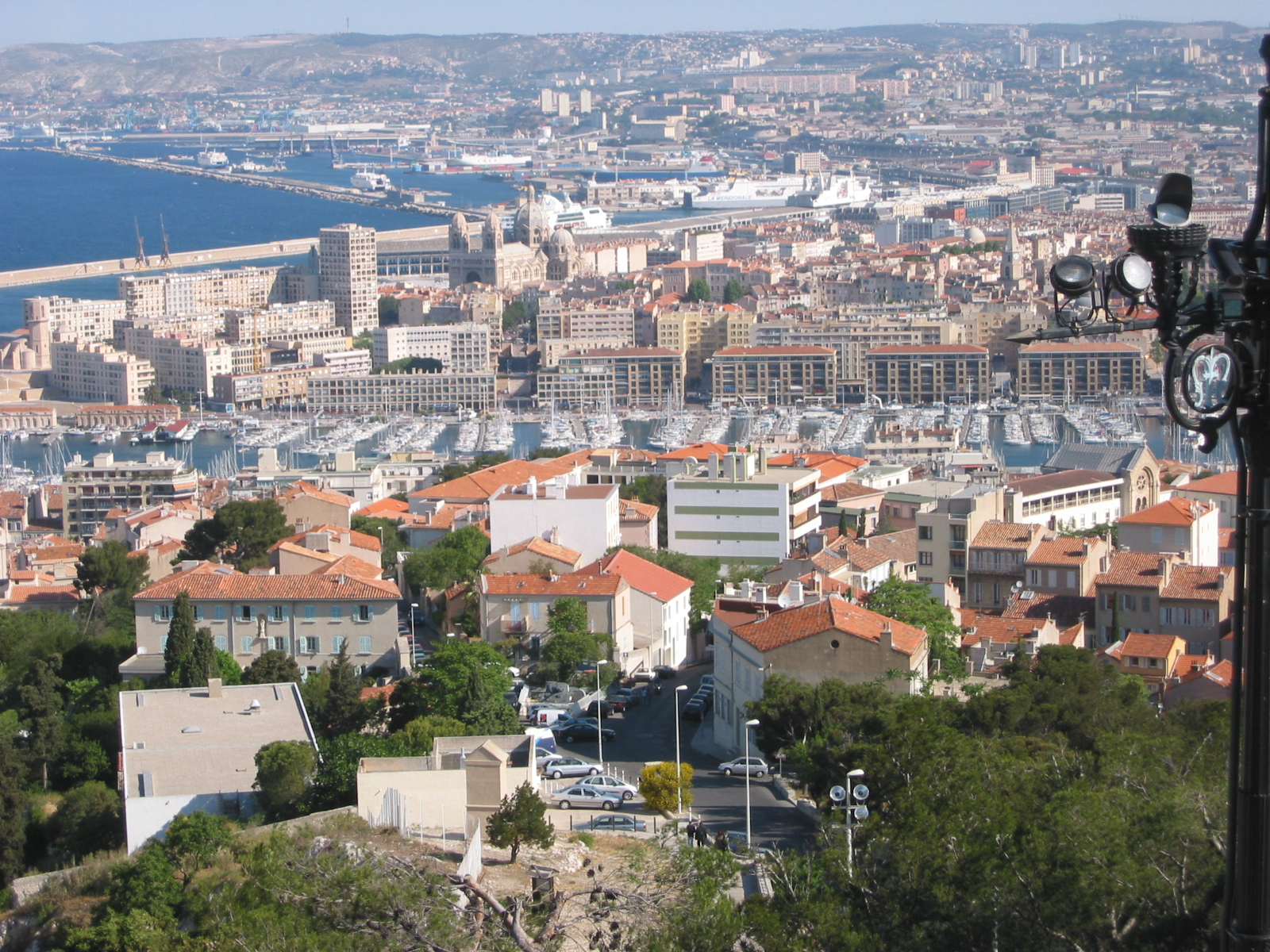
Old Port of Marseille hosted sailing for the 2024 Summer Olympics in Paris.

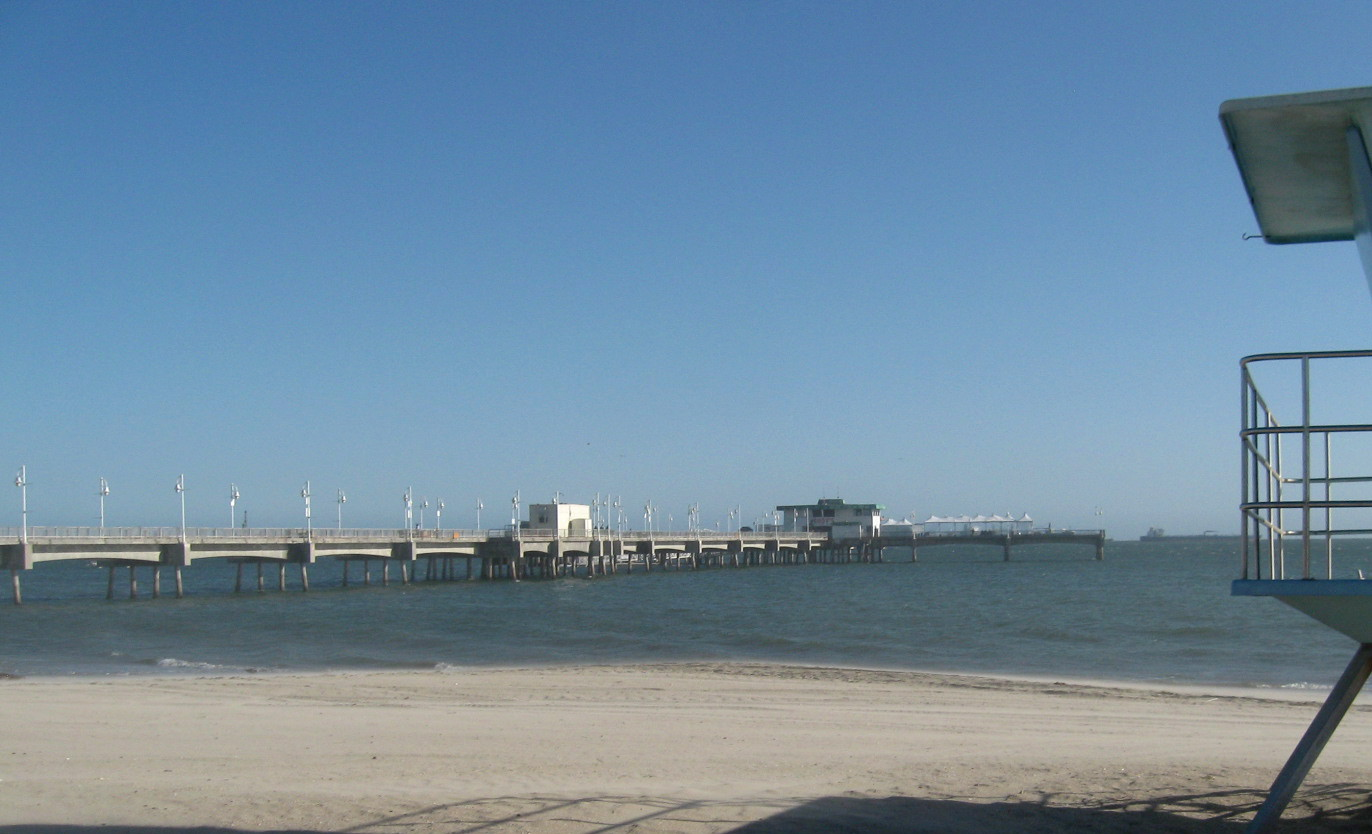
Belmont Veterans Memorial Pier will host sailing at the 2028 Summer Olympics in Los Angeles.
