= Contender World Championship =

Sailing World Championship

The Contender World Championship is an annual international sailing regatta for Contender (dinghy) they are organized by the host club on behalf of the International Class Association and recognized by World Sailing, the sports IOC recognized governing body.

== Events ==
| Event | | | Host | | | Participation | | | | | Ref. |
| Ed. | Dates | Year | Host club | Location | Country | Tot. | M | F | Nat. | Cont. | Ref. |
|---|---|---|---|---|---|---|---|---|---|---|---|
| 1 | - | 1970 | Hayling Island Sailing Club | Hayling Island | United Kingdom | | | | | | |
| N/A | - | 1971 | NOT HELD | | | | | | | | |
| 2 | - | 1972 | | Medemblik | Netherlands | | | | | | |
| 3 | - | 1973 | | Imperia | Italy | | | | | | |
| N/A | - | 1974 | NOT HELD | | | | | | | | |
| 4 | - | 1974/75 | | Manly, Brisbane | Australia | | | | | | |
| 5 | - | 1976 | | Palo Alto, California | United States | 32 | 31 | 1 | 5 | 3 | |
| 6 | - | 1977 | Kieler Yacht Club | Kiel, Schleswig-Holstein | Germany | 49 | | | 15 | 5 | |
| N/A | - | 1978 | NOT HELD | | | | | | | | |
| 7 | - | 1979 | | Takapuna | New Zealand | | | | | | |
| 8 | - | 1980 | | Hayling Island | United Kingdom | 98 | | | 9 | 4 | |
| 9 | - | 1981 | Outer Harbour Centreboard Club | Toronto | Canada | | | | | | |
| 10 | - | 1982 | Royal Yacht Club Hollandia | Medemblik | Netherlands | 81 | | | 12 | 3 | |
| 11 | - | 1983 | | | | | | | | | |
| 12 | 1-9 Sep | 1984 | Fraglia Vela Riva | Riva del Garda | Italy | 114 | | | 13 | 3 | |
| 13 | - | 1985 | | Struer | Denmark | | | | | | |
| 14 | - | 1986 | | Santa Cruz, California | United States | 23 | | | 4 | 3 | |
| 15 | - | 1987 | | Hamburgsund | Sweden | | | | | | |
| 16 | - | 1988 | | Brisbane | Australia | 66 | | | 4 | 2 | |
| 17 | - | 1989 | | Travemunde | Germany | | | | | | |
| 18 | - | 1990 | | Hayling Island | United Kingdom | | | | | | |
| 19 | - | 1991 | | Marsala, Sicily | Italy | | | | | | |
| 20 | - | 1992 | | Melbourne | Australia | | | | | | |
| 21 | - | 1993 | Royal Yacht Club Hollandia | Medemblik | Netherlands | 64 | | | 9 | 2 | |
| 22 | - | 1994 | Union-Yacht-Club Attersee | Attersee (lake) | Austria | | | | | | |
| 23 | 10-17 Sep | 1995 | Roton Point Sailing Association | Rowayton, Connecticut | United States | | | | | | |
| 24 | 1-6 Sep | 1996 | | Weymouth | United Kingdom | 116 | | | 7 | 3 | |
| 25 | 31Dec -9Jan | 1997/98 | | Sydney | Australia | 63 | | | 7 | 3 | |
| 26 | 6-11 Sep | 1998 | | Cagliari, Sardinia | Italy | 68 | | | 8 | 2 | |
| 27 | 18-26 Sep | 1999 | Kieler Yacht Club | Kiel, Schleswig-Holstein | Germany | 73 | | | 8 | 3 | |
| 28 | 13-18 Aug | 2000 | | Medemblik | Netherlands | 107 | | | 10 | 3 | |
| 29 | 4-10 Aug | 2001 | Canadian Olympic-training Regatta, Kingston | Portsmouth Olympic Harbour, Kingston, Ontario | Canada | 31 | | | 7 | 3 | |
| 30 | 10-19 Jan | 2002 | Black Rock Yacht Club, Australia | Black Rock, Victoria | Australia | 63 | | | 8 | 3 | |
| 31 | 18-22 Aug | 2003 | Mayflower Sailing Club, Mountbatten Centre | Plymouth | United Kingdom | 83 | | | 8 | 3 | |
| 32 | 31Jul -7Aug | 2004 | Fraglia Vela Riva | Riva del Garda | Italy | 143 | | | 9 | 3 | |
| 33 | 23-29 Jul | 2005 | Travemünder Woche / Lubecker Yacht Club | Travemünde, Lübeck | Germany | 110 | | | 10 | 3 | |
| 34 | 7-14 Jan | 2006 | Fremantle Sailing Club | Fremantle, Western Australia | Australia | 61 | | | 9 | 3 | |
| 35 | 13-21 Jul | 2007 | Royal Yacht Club Hollandia | Medemblik | Netherlands | 144 | | | 11 | 3 | |
| 36 | 13-23 Aug | 2008 | Canadian Olympic-training Regatta, Kingston | Portsmouth Olympic Harbour, Kingston, Ontario | Canada | 34 | | | 8 | 3 | |
| 37 | 25-31 Jul | 2009 | Sønderborg Yacht-Club | Sønderborg | Denmark | 112 | | | 13 | 3 | |
| 38 | 7-12 Jan | 2010 | Royal Queensland Yacht Squadron | Manly, Brisbane, Queensland | Australia | 60 | | | 7 | 3 | |
| 39 | 18-22 Jul | 2011 | Weymouth and Portland National Sailing Academy | Isle of Portland | United Kingdom | 143 | | | 10 | 2 | |
| 40 | 22-28 Apr | 2012 | St. Petersburg Yacht Club, Florida | St. Petersburg, Florida | United States | 43 | | | 8 | 3 | |
| 41 | 14-20 Jul | 2013 | Centro Vela Alto Lario | Lake Como | Italy | 172 | 165 | 7 | 11 | 3 | |
| 42 | 19-25 Jan | 2014 | Belmont 16ft Sailing Club | Belmont, Lake Macquarie, NSW | Australia | 67 | 65 | 2 | 7 | 2 | |
| 43 | 25-31 Jul | 2015 | | Medemblik | Netherlands | 132 | 126 | 6 | 11 | 3 | |
| 44 | 23-29 Apr | 2016 | Santa Cruz Yacht Club | Santa Cruz | United States | 33 | 32 | 1 | 8 | 3 | |
| 45 | 2-10 Jul | 2017 | Sønderborg Yacht-Club | Sønderborg | Denmark | 106 | 99 | 7 | 8 | 2 | |
| 46 | 19-25 Jan | 2018 | McCrae Yacht Club | McCrae, Victoria | Australia | 90 | 87 | 3 | 7 | 3 | |
| 47 | 20-26 Jul | 2019 | | Quiberon | France | 127 | 122 | 5 | 11 | 3 | |
| N/A | - | 2020 | | | Netherlands | (Cancelled COVID) | | | | | |
| N/A | - | 2021 | | Lake Silvaplana | Switzerland | COVID made a Europeans | | | | | |
| 48 | 16-20 Jan | 2023(22) | Royal Freshwater Bay Yacht Club | Peppermint Grove, Perth, WA | Australia | 32 | 32 | 0 | 5 | 2 | |
| 49 | 1-8 Jul | 2023 | Kerteminde Sejlklub | Kerteminde | Denmark | 111 | 106 | 5 | 11 | 3 | |
| 50 | 17-23 Feb | 2025(24) | Pensacola Yacht Club | Pensacola, Florida | United States | 35 | 33 | 2 | 7 | 2 | |
| 51 | 28Jul -3Aug | 2025 | Fraglia Vela Malcesine | Malcesine, Lake Garda | Italy | 167 | | | 12 | 3 | |

== Multiple World Champions ==
Compiled from the data below the table includes up to and including 2025

| Ranking | Sailor | Gold | Silver | Bronze | Total | No. Entries* | Ref. |
| 1 | Andrea Bonezzi (ITA) | 7 | 6 | 5 | 18 | 23 | |
| 2 | Mark Bulka (AUS) | 5 | 2 | 2 | 8 | 10 | |
| 3 | Peter Newlands (NZL) | 3 | 1 | 1 | 5 | 6 | |
| 4 | Barry Watson (AUS) | 3 | 1 | 0 | 4 | 4 | |
| 5 | David Pitman (GBR) | 3 | 0 | 0 | 3 | 4 | |
| 6 | Graham Scott (GBR) | 2 | 3 | 0 | 5 | 17 | |
| 7 | Stuart Jones (GBR) | 2 | 2 | 1 | 5 | 16 | |
| 8 | Marcus Hamilton (AUS) | 2 | 2 | 0 | 4 | 7 | |
| 9 | Soren Dulong Andreasen (DEN) | 2 | 1 | 4 | 7 | 21 | |
| 10 | Tony Smith (NZL) | 2 | 0 | 0 | 2 | 4 | |
| 10 | Arthur Brett (AUS) | 2 | 0 | 0 | 2 | 4 | |
| 10 | Steven Daniel (GBR) | 2 | 0 | 0 | 2 | 4 | |
| 10 | Peter Hollis (AUS) | 2 | 0 | 0 | 2 | 2 | |

- Some years full results are not available so this may be an under estimations

== Medalists ==
| Year | Gold | Silver | Bronze |
|---|---|---|---|
| 1970 | Dick Jobbins (GBR) | Ubert Raudashl (AUT) | Mike Alsop (AUS) |
| 1971 | NOT HELD | | |
| 1972 | Peter Hollis (AUS) | | |
| 1973 | Peter Hollis (AUS) | David Pitman GBR Craig Moffet   IRL | |
| 1974 | NOT HELD | | |
| 1975 | David Pitman (GBR) | | |
| 1976 | David Pitman (GBR) | Paul Wells (USA) | Peter Newlands (GBR) |
| 1977 | David Pitman (GBR) | Geoff Whitfield (GBR) | Richard Gladwell (GBR) |
| 1978 | NOT HELD | | |
| 1979 | Peter Newlands (GBR) | | |
| 1980 | Peter Newlands (GBR) and Geoff Whitfield (GBR) | | Brian Bennett (NZL) |
| 1981 | Peter Newlands (GBR) | | |
| 1982 | Tony Smith (NZL) | Peter Newlands (GBR) | Keith Paul (GBR) |
| 1983 | Tony Smith (NZL) | | |
| 1984 | Barry Watson (AUS) | Keith Paul (GBR) | Joachim P. Rosler (GER) |
| 1985 | Barry Watson (AUS) | | |
| 1986 | Mark Starratt (USA) | Barry Watson (AUS) | Pieter Visser (NED) |
| 1987 | John Webb (GBR) | | |
| 1988 | Steve Daniel (GBR) | Brian Rodger (AUS) | Steven Grimes (AUS) |
| 1989 | Steve Daniel (GBR) | | |
| 1990 | John Hardman (GBR) | John Browett (GBR) | Steve Daniel (GBR) |
| 1991 | Andrea Bonezzi (ITA) | Christopher Burrough (GBR) | Graham Scott (GBR) |
| 1992 | Barry Watson (AUS) | | |
| 1993 | Stuart Jones (GBR) | Andrea Bonezzi (ITA) | Steven Grimes (AUS) |
| 1994 | Graham Scott (GBR) | | |
| 1995 | Graham Scott (GBR) | Stuart Jones (GBR) | Andrea Bonezzi (ITA) |
| 1996 | Ian Renilson (GBR) | Neil Wilson (GBR) | Jason Beebe (AUS) |
| 1997 | Andrea Bonezzi (ITA) | Ian Renilson (GBR) | Nigel Walbank (GBR) |
| 1998 | Stuart Jones (GBR) | Graham Scott (GBR) | Andrea Bonezzi (ITA) |
| 1999 | Andrea Bonezzi (ITA) | Stuart Jones (GBR) | Ian Renilson (GBR) |
| 2000 | Gabriel Wicke (GER) | Andrea Bonezzi (ITA) | Ian Renilson (GBR) |
| 2001 | Arthur Brett (AUS) | Andrea Bonezzi (ITA) | Nigel Walbank (GBR) |
| 2002 | Arthur Brett (AUS) | Tim Holden (GBR) | Andrea Bonezzi (ITA) |
| 2003 | Andrea Bonezzi (ITA) | Tim Holden (GBR) | Stuart Jones (GBR) |
| 2004 | Andrea Bonezzi (ITA) | Marcus Hamilton (AUS) | Giovanni Bonzio (ITA) |
| 2005 | Jan von der Bank (GER) | Andrea Bonezzi (ITA) | Giovanni Bonzio (ITA) |
| 2006 | Andrea Bonezzi (ITA) | Marcus Hamilton (AUS) | Tim Hill (AUS) |
| 2007 | Marcus Hamilton (AUS) | Andrea Bonezzi (ITA) | Jan Von Der Bank (GER) |
| 2008 | Marcus Hamilton (AUS) | Marco Versari (ITA) | Søren Dulong Andreasen (DEN) |
| 2009 | Andrea Bonezzi (ITA) | Jono Neate (AUS) | Jacob Lunding (DEN) |
| 2010 | Jono Neate (AUS) | Andrea Bonezzi (ITA) | Christoph Homeier (GER) |
| 2011 | Bjarke Johnsen (DEN) | Graham Scott (GBR) | Søren Dulong Andreasen (DEN) |
| 2012 | Antonio Lambertini (ITA) | Giovanni Bonzio (ITA) | Søren Dulong Andreasen (DEN) |
| 2013 | Søren Dulong Andreasen (DEN) | Simon Mussel (GBR) | Mark Bulka (AUS) |
| 2014 | Mark Bulka (AUS) | Jono Neate (AUS) | Matthew Mulder (AUS) |
| 2015 | Simon Mussell (GBR) | Mark Bulka (AUS) | Andrea Bonezzi (ITA) |
| 2016 | Mark Bulka (AUS) | Jason Beebe (AUS) | Simon Mussell (GBR) |
| 2017 | Jason Beebe (AUS) | Mark Bulka (AUS) | Jesper Nielsen (DEN) |
| 2018 | Mark Bulka (AUS) | Jason Beebe (AUS) | Andrea Bonezzi (ITA) |
| 2019 | Max Billerberck (GER) | Graham Scott (GBR) | Soren Dulong Andreasen (DEN) |
| 2020 | COVID | | |
| 2021 | COVID | | |
| 2022 | Mark Bulka (AUS) | Simon Barwood (AUS) | Lindsay Irwin (AUS) |
| 2023 | Soren Dulong Andreasen (DEN) | Christoph Homeier (GER) | Mark Bulka (AUS) |
| 2024 | Graeme Willcox (GBR) (RSA) | Soren Dulong Andreasen (DEN) | Rene Heynen (NED) |
| 2025 | Mark Bulka (AUS) | Antonio LAMBERTINI (ITA) | Graeme Willcox (GBR) (RSA) |
