= Alex Groves =

British sailor

Alex Groves is a British sailor.

Together with teammate Max Richardson Groves became third at the 2008 World Championships in the 29er boat by finishing behind Australian couples Steven Thomas/Jasper Warren and Byron White/William Ryan to claim the bronze.

Groves now studies music at the University of Bristol.

== Career highlights ==
World Championships
2008 - Sorrento, (bronze) 3rd, 29er (with Max Richardson)
