= Australian Yachtsman of the Year =

Australian yacht award

Australian Yachtsman of the Year Award was created in 1962 by Max Press, OAM, the then Commodore of the Parkdale Yacht Club in Melbourne. The club was launching an appeal to build its new clubhouse on Port Phillip Bay foreshore at Parkdale and to hold an annual Ball at the Springvale Town Hall. To further the attendances, Max Press approached Ampol, the Australian petroleum company and a supporter of sailing through its part sponsorship of the 1962 Australian bid for the America's Cup with the 12-metre yacht, Gretel launched by the syndicate head, Sir Frank Packer. Ampol supported this award for many years, which recognises the outstanding achievements of leading Australian yachtsmen and women.

Rolex, the Swiss watch company, supported the award for many years, presenting a Rolex Submariner to the winner annually.

The award presentations moved to Sydney in 1966 when the voting panel was handed to the Editors of the national boating publication, Modern Boating. The Award briefly went back to Melbourne for three years being presented at the opening of the Melbourne International Boat Show.

In recent years, the award was taken over by Australian Sailing – the governing body for the sport of sailing in Australia.

== List of winners of the Australian Yachtsman of the Year award ==
From 1962 to 1996

Year	Winner	Achievement	Reference
1962–63	Jock Sturrock MBE	Skipper of the America's Cup challenger, Gretel	
1963–64	Bryan Price	World Champion in the 505 class	
1964–65	Bill Northam	Gold Medalist in the 5.5-metre class at the 1964 Olympic Games at Enoshima, Tokyo. Australia's first ever Gold medal win in sailing.	
1965–66	Tryge and Magnus Halvorsen	Still unbeaten record of three successive wins in the Sydney to Hobart Yacht Race	
1966–67	Craig Whitworth and Robert Miller (Ben Lexcen)	Australian Champions in the Flying Dutchman class	
1967–68	John Cuneo	Australian Dragon representative at the 1968 Olympic Games	
1968–69	Carl Ryves	Australian Flying Dutchman representative at the 1968 Olympic Games	
1969–70	David McKay	World Champion in the Moth class	
1970–71	Syd Fischer OBE	World One Ton Champion on Stormy Petrel	
1971–72	John Gilder	World and Australian Champion in the 420 class	
1972–73	David Forbes	Gold Medalist in the Star class at the 1972 Olympic Games	
1973–74	Peter Hollis	Twice World Champion in the Contender class	
1974–75	Kevin J McCann OAM	For outstanding services to yachting as Olympic Team Manager and as an Administrator. The first time a Team Captain and Administrator has won this award.	
1975–76	Tom Stephenson	World Half Ton Champion on Foxy Lady	
1976–77	John Bertrand OAM	Bronze medalist in the Finn class at the 1976 Olympic Games	
1977–78	Brian Lewis	Australian Champion and runner-up in the World Championships in the Tornado class and as the Australian Tornado representative at the 1976 Olympic Games	
1978–79	Mike Fletcher OAM	Australia's first Olympic yachting coach	
1979–1980	Peter (Pod) O'Donnell	World Champion in the Etchells class	
1980–81	Sir James Hardy OBE	America's Cup helmsman and involved in four America's Cup challenges	
1981–82	Mark Bethwaite	World Champion in both J/24 and Soling classes	
1982–83	Alan Bond, John Bertrand and Ben Lexcen	Winners of the America's Cup on Australia II	
1983–84	Chris Cairns and Scott Anderson	Bronze Medalists at the 1984 Olympic Games and consecutive World Champions in the Tornado class	
1984–85	Iain Murray AM	World Champion in the Etchells class	
1985–86	Colin Beashel OAM	World Champion in the 12-metre class on board Australia II	
1986–87	Stuart Wallace	First Australian winner of the Laser class at the World Championships	
1987–88	Peter Gilmour	World Champion in the 12-metre class and World Match Racing Champion	
1988–89	Glenn Bourke	Twice World Champion in the Laser class	
1989–90	Glenn Bourke	World Champion for a third time in the Laser class	
1990–91	John Dransfield	Three times World Champion in the Fireball class	
1991–92	Mitch Booth and John Forbes	Bronze medalists at the 1992 Olympic Games and World Champions in the Tornado class	
1992–93	Syd Fischer OBE	Winner of the Sydney to Hobart Yacht Race on board Ragamuffin and Captain of the Admiral's Cup Team	
1993–94	Chris and Darren Nicholson	Twice World Champions in the 505 class	
1994–95	David Adams	Winner of Class 2 in the BOC Challenge (solo round-the-world yacht race) in True Blue	
1995–96	Mitch Booth and Andrew Landenberger	Silver medalists in the 1996 Olympic Games in the Tornado class	

== Male Sailor of the Year Award, and Female Sailor of the Year Award ==
From 1996, the award was restructured into Male Sailor of the Year, and Female Sailor of the Year.

Year	Male Winner	Achievement	Female Winner	Achievement
1996–98	Chris Nicholson and Daniel Phillips	World Champions in the 49er class	Sarah Blanck	Gold medalist at the Women's Laser Radial World Championships
1998–99	Colin Beashel and David Giles	Australia's first World Champions in the Star class	Melanie Dennison	Silver medalist in the Olympic Europe World Championships
1999-00	Lars Kleppich	World Champion in the Olympic Mistral One Design sailboard and gold medal at the 1999 pre-Olympic regatta	Jessica Crisp	Consistent outstanding performance in the Olympic Mistral One Design sailboard
2000–01	Tom King and Mark Turnbull	Gold medalists in the men's 470 class at the 2000 Olympic Games and Australia's first World 470 Champions	Jenny Armstrong and Belinda Stowell	Gold medalists in the women's 470 class at the 2000 Olympic Games and Australia's first women's Olympic sailing gold medalists
2001–02	Arthur Brett, Darren Bundock and John Forbes	Two award winners: Brett – 2001 and 2002 Contender World Champion; Bundock and Forbes – 2001 World, European and Australian Tornado class champions	Jenny Armstrong and Belinda Stowell	Second placing in 2001 470 World Championships
2002–03	Darren Bundock and John Forbes	Winners at the 2002 Tornado World Championships (Forbes' fifth and Bundock's third World Championship)	Adrienne Cahalan	Key member of teams that set four open World Sailing speed records in the space of five months
2003–04	Darren Bundock and John Forbes	Winners of the 2003 Tornado World Championships (Forbes' sixth and Bundock's fourth World Championship), the pre-Olympic regatta, and the Tornado class at the European Sailing Championships in 2003 and 2004.	Krystal Weir	Winner of the 2004 World and Australian Laser Radial Championship
2004–05	Richard Perini	Winner of the 2004 Mumm 30 World Championship and the 2005 Rolex Farr 40 World Championships	Adrienne Cahalan	Navigator and weather router on the Cheyenne which in 2004 broke the Around the world sailing record
2005–06	James Spithill	2005 ISAF Match Racing World Champion	Allison Shreeve	In 2006, she scored the Women's Australian Formula Windsurfing Championship winning every race. Winner of the Windsurfing Worlds, the Formula Oceanic Championships and the South American Windsurfing Title
2006–07	Darren Bundock and Glenn Ashby	Winners of the Princess Sofia Trophy, Kiel Week, World Tornado Championships, second in Holland Regatta, Tornado World Championships, and the Tornado South American Championships-in 2007 they won the Rolex Miami OCR and again the Princess Sofia Trophy gaining the world number one ranking in the Tornado Class.	Sarah Blanck	Sarah moved to the Laser Radial class in 2005 after being our highest placed Olympian in Athens with a 4th in the Europe class. She was World Champion in the Europe's in 2002.In 2006 she won a bronze medal in the ISAF World Sailing Games and won the Laser Radial class at the Sydney Int.Regatta and won the 05–06 Australian Radial class championships. Currently ranked 4th in this class and is co-captain of the Australian Sailing Team.
2007–08	Tom Slingsby	Winner of the 2007 Laser World Championships	Elise Rechichi and Tessa Parkinson	Gold medalists in the 470 class at the Olympic Sailing Test Event and bronze medalists at the 2008 Women's 470 World Championships
2008–09	Nathan Wilmot and Malcolm Page	Gold medalists at the 2008 Olympic Games in the men's 470 class.	Elise Rechichi and Tessa Parkinson	Gold medalists at the 2008 Olympic Games in the women's 470 class
2009–10	James Spithill	Skipper/helmsman for BMW Oracle Racing, winning the 33rd America's Cup, and becoming the youngest ever winner of the America's Cup	Nicole Souter, Rayshele Martin, Nina Curtis, Lucinda Whitty, Kat Stroinovsky and Amanada Scrivenor	Gold medalists at the 2009 ISAF Women's Match Racing World Championship
2010–11	Tom Slingsby	Winner of the 2010 Laser World Championship, First Australian to win the ISAF World Sailor of the Year Award and the ISAF World Sailor Cup.	Lynda Patterson	Winner of the 2010 Laser Grand Master Worlds sailed at Hayling Island, UK
2011–12	Tom Slingsby, Malcolm Page, Mathew Belcher, Nathan Outteridge and Iain Jensen	Gold Medalists at the 2012 Olympic Games in the Laser, 470 and 49er classes respectively	Olivia Price, Nina Curtis and Lucinda Whitty	Silver medalists at the 2012 Olympic Games in the Elliott 6m match racing
2012–13	Mathew Belcher and William Ryan	Winners of nine 470 regattas, including the 470 World Championships	Carrie Smith and Ella Clarke	Gold medalists in the 420 girls class at the 2013 ISAF Youth Sailing World Championships
2014	Mathew Belcher and William Ryan		Vanessa Dudley	Completed her 18th Sydney to Hobart Yacht Race, finishing 2nd on Ragamuffin 100 and was 2013 World Champion in the grand-master Laser Radial class at the Laser Master World Championships
2015	Mathew Belcher and William Ryan	Gold medalists in the 470 class at the 2014 ISAF Sailing World Championships	Lisa Darmanin	Second place at the Nacra 17 World Championships
2016	Tom Burton	Won Olympic Gold in the Laser Class at the Rio 2016 Olympic Games	Lisa Darmanin	Together with her cousin Jason Waterhouse, Lisa won the silver medal at the Rio 2016 Olympic Games in the Nacra 17 Class. They finished just one point behind the gold medalists in a highly competitive field.
2017	Glen Ashby	Skipper of the 2017 America's Cup winners, Emirates Team New Zealand	Tash Bryant and Annie Wilmot	Won 2017 Youth Sailing World Championship in the 29er class
2018	Matthew Wearn	Won Oceania Laser Championships, Trofeo Princesa Sofía and Laser European Championships	Wendy Tuck	First female skipper to win the Clipper Round the World race (or any Round the World yacht race) aboard Sanya Serenity Coast.
2019	Mathew Belcher and William Ryan	Belcher and Ryan remained world number one throughout the entire nomination period in the 470 class. They dominated their class internationally, as they claimed the 470 World Championship, Ready Steady Tokyo Olympic Test Event and the World Cup Series events in Marseilles and Enoshima.	Nia Jerwood and Monique de Vries	Finished ninth at the 470 World Championships and second at the World Cup Series event in Enoshima
2020	Tom Slingsby	SailGP champion and winner at the 2019 Moth World Championships in Perth	Lisa Darmanin	Won bronze medals at two Nacra 17 World championships
2021	Mathew Belcher and William Ryan	Belcher and Ryan dominated the Men's 470 class at the Tokyo 2020 Olympics, securing Gold before the Medal race which they went on to win	Lisa Darmanin	Lisa Darmanin proved again in 2020/21 that she is among the very elite female sailors in Australia, finishing 5th at the 2020 Tokyo Olympics and 1st at a Coaches regatta in Europe during the awards period.
2022	Tom Slingsby	Slingsby dominated the global sailing scene with significant victories in multiple classes, including leading Australia SailGP team to their second consecutive SailGP championship, winning his second consecutive Moth World Championship and Helming Commanche to a monohull race record in the Rolex Middle Sea race.	Mara Stransky	Won the ILCA 6 class at Kiel Week along with top-10 finishes at the World Championships, Hyeres Olympic Week and Allianz World Cup Almere regattas
2023	Matthew Wearn	Tokyo Olympic ILCA 7 champion, Matt Wearn worked his way through the season beautifully, with top ten results at the European Championships (where he won Bronze), Palma and Hyeres before going on to win the Olympic Test Event in Marseille after a stunning victory in the Medal Race.	Mara Stransky	Stransky put together her most consistent season to date, collecting 18 race podiums in her wake. She notched top fifteen results at the 2022 European and World Championships before top ten finishes at the European Championships and Trofeo Princesa Sofía in 2023.
2024	Matthew Wearn	Matt re-wrote the record books in 2024, winning his second consecutive World Championship and second consecutive Olympic gold medal in the ILCA 7 class.	Breiana Whitehead	Whitehead had a breakthrough year in the Formula Kite class, which included an Overall win at the Princesa Sofia Mallorca in Palma and fifth places at both the World Championships and the French Olympic Week regatta in Hyères.
