= 2015 29er World Championship =

16th 29er World Championship

Zhik 2015 29er World Championship

Event title
- Name: Zhik 2015 29er World Championship
- Edition: 16th
- Sponsor: Zhik
- Host: Pwllheli Sailing Club

Event details
- Venue: Pwllheli Sailing Club, Wales
- Dates: 9 - 14 August 2016

Competitors
- Competitors: 386
- Competing nations: 25

Results
- (gold) Gold: Kyle O'Connell; Tom Siganto
- (silver) Silver: Ignacio Varisco; Federico Garcia
- (bronze) Bronze: Christopher Williford; Wade Waddell

The 2015 29er World Championship was the 16th 29er World Championship, and took place at Pwllheli Sailing Club in Gwynedd, Wales. The event took place between 9 and 14 August 2015. The event was won by Australians Kyle O'Connell and Tom Siganto, who also won the youth fleet. Mimi El-Khazindar and Emma Loveridge of Great Britain finished as first female boat.

== Results ==
Points carried forward from qualifying series not represented. Gold Series only.

Rank	Nation	Crew	Carried forward	Penalties	Total Points	Net Points	Race										Total Points	Net Points
Rank	Nation	Crew	Carried forward	Penalties	Total Points	Net Points	1	2	3	4	5	6	7	8	9	10	Total Points	Net Points
1st place, gold medalist(s)	Australia	Kyle O'Connell Tom Sigantoni	8		106	59	5	2	2	1	(SCP [22])	8	6	(25)	10	17	106	59
2nd place, silver medalist(s)	Argentina	Ignacio Varisco Federico Garcia	10		119	60	10	(23)	16	(36)	10	1	5	5	2	1	119	60
3rd place, bronze medalist(s)	United States	Christopher Williford Wade Waddell	4		153	84	8	11	6	(35)	16	(34)	16	20	1	2	153	84
4	Slovenia	Peter Lin Janezic Anze Podlogar	20		164	88	7	4	(50)	2	2	18	7	(26)	7	21	164	88
5	Sweden	Emil Jarudd Julius Hallstrom	9		159	95	11	15	(33)	10	(31)	15	11	1	20	3	159	95
6	Australia	John Cooley Simon Hoffman	6		167	103	19	5	18	(31)	11	25	1	15	3	(33)	167	103
7	New Zealand	Jackson Keon Nick Egnot-Johnson	12		162	104	(28)	20	7	9	(30)	24	2	4	21	5	162	104
8	France	Gwendal Nael Pierre Tydgat	7		174	110	4	3	10	19	(33)	4	23	(31)	13	27	174	110
9	Hong Kong	Yann D'Argenlieu Nathan Bradley	22		208	112	3	18	(49)	32	5	5	10	9	8	(47)	208	112
10	United States	Nicolas Muller Ian MacDiarmid	11		181	113	17	16	12	3	(20)	10	(48)	16	16	12	181	113
11	New Zealand	Tam Lindsay William Mckenzie	3		184	114	13	9	(42)	5	1	11	(28)	24	26	22	184	114
12	New Zealand	James Wilson Oscar Gunn	1		182	119	(35)	14	23	(28)	25	23	4	7	11	11	182	119
13	United States	Max Brill Andrew Person	21		176	123	23	1	9	(26)	8	(27)	14	10	14	23	176	123
14	United Kingdom	James Grummett Daniel Budden	5		233	134	(48)	(BFD)	28	22	9	29	13	3	15	10	233	134
15	Finland	Alexander Gronblom Martin Mikkola	39		222	138	12	6	14	12	(45)	7	17	12	19	(39)	222	138
16	United Kingdom	Crispin Beaumont Tom Darling	33		211	145	20	22	11	11	17	17	8	6	(42)	(24)	211	145
17	Norway	Tomas Mathisen Mads Mathisen	17		235	153	(SCP [40])	21	1	34	6	21	21	(42)	12	20	235	153
18	Argentina	Brian Higgins Nicolas Peirano Prat	15		215	154	15	17	(32)	18	19	26	(29)	11	25	8	215	154
19	Denmark	Daniel Nyborg Sebastian E Olsen	13		256	158	14	7	46	6	22	(BFD)	(47)	39	4	7	256	158
20	Netherlands	Pieter Van Leijen Richard Schuurmans	16		257	167	(45)	(45)	15	4	21	6	38	37	5	25	257	167
21	Netherlands	Cas Van Dongen Robin Becker	29		263	169	(UFD)	31	8	(43)	4	2	3	21	30	41	263	169
22	Finland	Juho Kotiranta Akseli Keskinen	2		254	172	21	12	27	(42)	37	22	22	13	(40)	16	254	172
23	United Kingdom	Rowan Edwards Daniel Blight	14		263	179	9	26	35	14	(41)	14	(43)	29	24	14	263	179
24	France	Brice Yrieix Hugh Ward	23		267.5	189.5	18	8	3	(37)	18	32	31.5	22	(41)	34	267.5	189.5
25	Estonia	Juuso Roihu Henri Roihu	24		280	194	30	(37)	30	(49)	12	3	26	33	18	18	280	194
26	Germany	Hinnerk Siemsen Soren Brandt	18		267	196	26	30	(36)	16	(35)	35	19	2	31	19	267	196
27	Switzerland	Wolf Van Cauwenberghe Romain Defferrard	35		293	200	(49)	10	39	8	13	13	9	36	37	(44)	293	200
28	Canada	Ryan Wood Andrew Wood	38		307	208	1	(BFD)	26	15	47	16	12	19	34	(48)	307	208
29	United Kingdom	Mimi El-Khazindar Emma Loveridge	28		309	219	24	27	5	41	28	40	(44)	17	(46)	9	309	219
30	United Kingdom	Tom Walker Billy Vennis-Ozanne	27		327	226	6	32	13	20	15	(BFD)	40	(50)	36	37	327	226
31	United Kingdom	Bobby Hewitt Harvey Martin	43		329	229	2	28	31	13	3	(BFD)	(49)	41	33	35	329	229
32	United Kingdom	Felix Crowther James Cook	46		332	238	33	35	4	7	23	33	18	(43)	39	(DNC)	332	238
33	Denmark	Casper Ladefoged Martin Michelsen	25		336	238	(47)	24	43	21	32	(DNF)	41	8	38	6	336	238
34	United States	Samuel Merson Michael Sabourin	36		321	239	29	19	34	29	29	(37)	25	32	6	(45)	321	239
35	United Kingdom	Elliott Wells Joshua Boniface	48		323	240	16	29	17	27	27	12	(36)	28	(47)	36	323	240
36	Denmark	Carl Emil Baad Nielsen Jakob Precht Jensen	19		347	251	34	34	24	(45)	(BFD)	42	15	30	27	26	347	251
37	United States	Jacob Rosenberg Rhodes Garner	30		349	257	(42)	39	38	(50)	40	39	20	38	9	4	349	257
38	Germany	Paul Farien Constantin Ernst	26		352	264	38	(43)	SCP [40]	40	38	(45)	33	14	22	13	352	264
39	Germany	Alex Baumann Felix Baumann	41		355	266	37	33	20	30	36	19	27	(49)	23	(40)	355	266
40	Spain	Pep Costa Santiago Alegre	40		372	271	39	13	47	17	14	(SCP [51])	(50)	27	32	42	372	271
41	France	Lucas Tissot Emile Raison	45		363	273	40	25	(45)	33	24	9	39	(45)	29	29	363	273
42	United Kingdom	Huw Edwards Josh Dawson	32		375	281	41	(46)	(48)	39	26	20	30	35	28	30	375	281
43	United Kingdom	Nick Robins Jake Todd	42		373	283	27	42	41	(46)	39	(44)	42	18	17	15	373	283
44	United Kingdom	Andrew Kilburn Matthew Rhodes	50		385	292	22	(47)	21	25	(46)	31	45	23	44	31	385	292
45	United Kingdom	Arran Holman Jamie Jobson	31		399	300	36	(48)	29	23	44	41	24	34	(UFD)	38	399	300
46	Germany	Manuel Wunderle Felix Wieland	49		400.5	309.5	31	(44)	19	38	42	36	31.5	(47)	35	28	400.5	309.5
47	Germany	Christian Wolter Michael Martin	44		422	335	(43)	38	(44)	24	34	43	37	40	43	32	422	335
48	New Zealand	Tom Fyfe Josh Handa	34		456	361	44	36	40	(47)	43	30	46	(48)	45	43	456	361
49	United Kingdom	Lewis Marr Aaron Murray	37		465	363	46	40	37	48	49	28	34	44	(DNF)	(DNC)	465	363
50	Germany	Bennet Steffens Mortiz Block	47		475	376	32	41	SCP [37]	44	(48)	(BFD)	35	46	48	46	475	376

Scoring system: low-point system; Source:

Legend: BFD – Black flag disqualification; DNC – Did not come to the starting area; DNF – Did not finish; DNS – Did not start; DNE – Disqualification (other than DGM) not excludable under rule 90.3(b); DNF – Started but did not finish; DNS – Came to the start area but did not start; DSQ – Disqualified; RDG – Redress given; RET – Retired; SCP –Scoring penalty under rule 44.3; UFD – "U" flag disqualification; (X) – Discarded race not counted in the overall result;
