= Max Richardson (sailor) =

British sailor (born 1991)

Max Richardson (born 17 September 1991) is a British sailor.

Together with team mate Alex Groves Richardson became third at the 2008 World Championships in the 29er boat by finishing behind Australian couples Steven Thomas/Jasper Warren and Byron White/William Ryan to claim the bronze.

== Career highlights ==
World Championships
2008 - Sorrento, (bronze) 3rd, 29er (with Alex Groves)
