= 2015 ISAF Youth Sailing World Championships – Girl's 420 =

Girl's 420 at the 2015 ISAF Youth Sailing World Championships
- Venue: Langkawi, Malaysia
- Dates: 27 December 2015 - 3 January 2016
- Competitors: 48 from 24 nations

Medalists
gold medal	Julia Szmit; Hanna Dzik	Poland
silver medal	Nia Jerwood; Lisa Smith	Australia
bronze medal	Maria Caba; Carla Diaz	Spain

The girl's 420 competition at the 2015 ISAF Youth Sailing World Championships took place between December 27, 2015, and January 3, 2016. 48 sailors from 24 nations were due to compete. Julia Szmit and Hanna Dzik of Polamd won the event.

== Results ==
Pos	Helm	Crew	Country	R1	R2	R3	R4	R5	R6	R7	R8	R9	Total	Nett
1	Julia Szmit	Hanna Dzik	Poland	2	3	4	13	2	3	1	1	(22)	51	29
2	Nia Jerwood	Lisa Smith	Australia	4	1	2	2	1	12	3	5	(13)	43	30
3	Maria Caba	Carla Diaz	Spain	3	(16)	5	5	3	11	4	2	5	54	38
4	Angelika Kohlendorfer	Viktoria Puxkandl	Austria	(17)	13	1	1	9	2	2	10	7	62	45
5	Jessie Kampman	Anael Pontheiu	France	9	5	11	11	4	20	(23)	4	1	88	65
6	Demi Rio	Maria Pasquali Coluzzi	Italy	6	12	9	(25 DNF)	7	9	19	6	2	95	70
7	Clara Videla	Sofia Videla	Argentina	11	11	6	7	6	5	(21)	8	16	91	70
8	Christine Klinger	Victoria Thompson	United States	1	6	7	3	12	21	6	(24)	15	95	71
9	Kersena Jennings	Chelsea Rees	New Zealand	5	2	(21)	12	15	1	7	15	17	95	74
10	Leyla Senocak	Aylin Tezol	Turkey	16	9	10	8	8	10	14	(23)	3	101	78
11	Elisa Yokoyama	Cheryl Teo	Singapore	7	14	(20)	18	11	7	10	3	9	99	79
12	Saara Tukiainen	Emilia Winqvist	Finland	15	7	3	15	10	4	8	(20)	19	101	81
13	Georgia Lewin-Lafrance	Terra Carling Lanteigne	Canada	8	(21)	8	16	5	13	17	7	14	109	88
14	Claria Penteado	Marina Rittscher	Brazil	10	8	12	14	13	14	5	16	(18)	110	92
15	Jennifer Cropley	Emma Baker	United Kingdom	21	4	13	6	21	19	(22)	13	4	123	101
16	Khairun Hanna Mohd Afendy	Siti Nur Fatihah Norulkhairi	Malaysia	12	(20)	15	9	14	15	13	19	8	125	105
17	Mafalda Pires De Lima	Marta Caldeira Rebelo Teixeira De Me	Portugal	14	(25 DSQ)	16	4	20	17	9	17	12	134	109
18	Theresa Leoffler	Theresa Heilingbrunner	Germany	(25 DNF)	25 DNF	14	17	17	6	18	11	6	139	114
19	Aurelia Fischer	Ilona Hersperger	Switzerland	20	19	18	(21)	18	8	15	14	21	154	133
20	Sutida Poonpat	Gunyaporn Bueangbon	Thailand	18	15	(25 DNF)	22	24	16	16	12	10	158	133
21	Alejandra Margarita	Castilda Flores	Mexico	22	10	19	10	16	(24)	12	21	24	158	134
22	Renatta Parodi	Carmina Malsch	Chile	13	18	(23)	20	22	18	20	22	11	167	144
23	Michaela Robinson	Jenna Bailes	South Africa	(25 RET)	17	17	25 DNF	19	23	24	9	20	179	154
24	Mai Igami	Erika Kuwano	Japan	19	22	22	19	(23)	22	11	18	23	179	156
