= Mara Stransky =

Australian sailor (born 1999)

Personal information
- Nationality: Australian
- Born: 13 February 1999 (age 27) New South Wales, Australia

Sport
- Sport: Sailing
- Club: Royal Queensland Yacht Squadron

Mara Stransky (born 13 February 1999) is an Australian competitive sailor. She spent her teenage years living permanently on board the family 50 ft (15 m) catamaran.

Stransky competed at the 2020 Summer Olympics in Tokyo 2021, in Laser Radial. She finished 14th in the field of 44. Detailed results.

In 2022 she won the Australian Sailing Female Sailor of the Year Award after winning the ILCA 6 class at Kiel Week along with top-10 finishes at the World Championships, Hyères Olympic Week and Allianz World Cup Almere regattas.
