= 2024 29er World Championship =

Event title
- Name: 2024 29er World Championship
- Edition: 24th
- Host: Aarhus International Sailing Center, Aarhus, Denmark

Event details
- Venue: Aarhus International Sailing Center
- Dates: 1 August - 9 August 2024
- Classes: 29er

Competitors
- Competitors: 516
- Competing nations: 27

Results
- (gold) Gold: Alex Demurtas; Giovanni Santi
- (silver) Silver: Ewa Lewandowska; Krzysztof Królik
- (bronze) Bronze: Jocelyn Le Goff; Jules Vidor

The 2024 29er World Championship was a world championship of sailing that was held at Aarhus International Sailing Center in Aarhus, Denmark. The 24th 29er World Championship took place between 1 August and 9 August 2024.

The event was won by Alex Demurtas and Giovanni Santi of Italy, who had previously finished 2nd in the 2022 29er World Championship, and 3rd at the 2023 World Championship.

== Summary ==
Reigning world champion Clementine Van Steenberge of Ireland finished 2nd in silver fleet after switching crews from her brother, Nathan Van Steenberge, to Jessica Riordan for the event. They finished as the 6th female team overall.

=== Qualifiers ===
There were 5 different winners of the first race of the day due to separate fleets. These winners included eventual event winners Alex Demurtas and Giovanni Santi, as well as female team Emily Polson and Tiffany Mak of Hong Kong, and Swedish mixed duo Selma Hård and Lukas Wolfgang. Alex Demurtas and Giovanni Santi went on to win the first 4 races in their fleet creating a dominant lead from the start of the championship. The top 3 in the qualifying series would be Alex Demurtas and Giovanni Santi, Ewa Lewandowska and Krzysztof Królik of Poland, with French duo Nolann Huet Des Aunay and Titouan Gresset finishing 3rd.

== Results ==
Gold fleet results are shown:

Rank	Nation	Crew	Carried forward	Race									Penalties	Total Points	Net Points
Rank	Nation	Crew	Carried forward	1	2	3	4	5	6	7	8	9	Penalties	Total Points	Net Points
1st place, gold medalist(s)	Italy	Alex Demurtas Giovanni Santi	11	2	6	2	4	12	(31)	7	2	1		78	47
2nd place, silver medalist(s)	Poland	Ewa Lewandowska Krzysztof Królik	14	19 SCP	2	3	(41)	3	3	18	4	13		120	79
3rd place, bronze medalist(s)	France	Jocelyn Le Goff Jules Vidor	25	12	3	1	7	14	11	4	(46 DNC)	11		134	88
4	France	Nolann Huet Des Aunay Titouan Gresset	24	11	5	27	15	36	1	(38)	10	16		183	145
5	United Kingdom	James Crossley Sam Webb	24	(38)	34	30	5	13	20	10	5	7		186	148
6	Italy	Giuseppe Montesano Enrico Coslovich	59	17	21	(40)	17	10	26	1	7	2		200	160
7	United Kingdom	Santiago Sesto-Cosby Ben Bradley	49	25	10	(43)	24	33	4	2	8	8		206	163
8	Argentina	Felix Llauro Marcos Pruden	65	19	18	4	19	8	15	13	(29)	3		193	164
9	United States	Logan Mraz Juan Albamonte	56	6	30	12	34	(38)	13	8	1	5		203	165
10	Australia	Lucas Patrick Luke Rogers	46	26	(28)	8	1	15	23	5	16	26		194	166
11	United Kingdom	Finian Morris Charlie Gran	43	8	12	23	(42)	35	32	3	3	14		215	173
12	Hungary	Soma Kis-Szölgyémi András Juhász	73	(27)	9	11	3	6	14	22	25	10		200	173
13	Argentina	Benjamin Rodriguez Moron Ronan Curnyn	70	16	20	9	2	4	(34)	25	15	17		212	178
14	Czech Republic	Lukas Kraus Ondrej Baštár	77	14	(31)	18	14	21	9	12	9	9		214	183
15	Germany	Moritz Wagner Leo Gradel	38	10	14	31	8	5	(38)	29	13	36		222	184
16	Denmark	Nicklas Holt Mads Larsen	53	3	36	33	23	(43)	6	16	14	4		231	188
17	Poland	Bartosz Zmudzinski August Sobczak	34	39	11	(42)	9	18	28	15	30	20		246	204
18	Hungary	Boróka Fehér Szonja Fehér	59	20	4	13	11	7	19	36	36	(39)		244	205
19	Poland	Alicja Tutkowska Alicja Dampc	49	15	32	16	10	31	5	28	(41)	25		252	211
20	United States	Kevin Cason Holland Vierling	68	21	29	5	16	25	7	(40)	24	22		257	217
21	Norway	Storm Kopperud Philip Forslund	54	24	1	28	(29)	28	24	21	21	21		251	222
22	Netherlands	Folkert Van Surksum Lars Ganzevles	79	4	19	19	26 SCP	19	(39)	31	19	6		261	222
23	New Zealand	William Mason Giorgio Mattiuzzo	36	29	8	(35)	32	17	30	34	6	32		259	224
24	Germany	Sophie Schneider Victoria Egger	60	(42)	22	14	26	39	12	20	20	12		267	225
25	Poland	Szymon Kolka Mateusz Gasiorowski	76	1	26	22	(33)	24	25	14	18	23		262	229
26	United States	Fynn Olsen Pierce Olsen	39	28	17	29	36 SCP	11	(40)	11	28	29	3	271	231
27	Denmark	Josefine Nøjgaard Esther Houborg	80	33	13	10	25	1	27	9	34	(38)		270	232
28	Germany	Lucas Hamm Moritz Hamm	39	22	(38)	37	20	9	33	37	32	15		282	244
29	France	Anatole Thomas Thelio Giannantoni	82	(44)	33	39	21	2	2	19	22	28		292	248
30	Germany	Truman Rogers Paula Lepa	74	13	(37)	20	30	20	17	24	31	27		293	256
31	Hungary	Mór Csekovszky Martin Zarandy	68	(40)	7	7	36	40	29	30	26	18		301	261
32	Italy	Giulia Bartolozzi Pietro Rizzi	53	32	35	26	(38)	26	18	17	23	35		303	265
33	Spain	Sara Momplet Baixauli Isabel Momplet Baixauli	44	35	24	15	6	32	37	35	40	(41)		309	268
34	Hong Kong	Emily Polson Tiffany Mak	29	9	42	32	40	16	(46 UFD)	32	33	37		316	270
35	Finland	Una Heinilä Lasse Lindell	80	23	(39)	36	31	29	10	26	17	33		324	285
36	Denmark	Marie Maier Nanna Nørgaard	72	7	40	21	37	30	(46 UFD)	27	27	31		338	292
37	United Kingdom	Annabelle Vines Amelie Hiscocks	58	36	27	25	27	23	36	23	38	(46 DNC)		339	293
38	Germany	Nick Plinke Nele Petersen	62	31	15	24	(44)	27	22	39	39	40		343	299
39	Poland	Igor Kawalko Fabian Kocieda	70	34	(43)	41	43	37	41	6	12	19		346	303
40	Finland	Assi Lindell Ines Karlemo	74	41	23	45	28	22	8	(46 DNF)	37	30		354	308
41	Hungary	Emília Juhász Boró Lacza	79	18	25	6	39	41	21	42	42	(46 DNC)		359	313
42	France	Alexandre Mostini Raphaël Allain	50	43	44	17	13	34	35	33	(46 DNC)	46 DNC		361	315
43	Hong Kong	Cameron Law Chris Lam	77	30	16	38	32 SCP	(42)	16	41	35	34		361	319
44	Poland	Jakub Kuras Wiktor Mielnik	74	45	45	44	35	44	43	(46 DNC)	11	24		411	365
45	Poland	Liwia Liszkiewicz Dominika Godlewska	75	37	41	34	45	45	42	(46 DNS)	46 DNC	46 DNC		457	411

Scoring system: low-point system; Source: Legend: BFD – Black flag disqualification; DNC – Did not come to the starting area; DNF – Did not finish; DNS – Did not start; DNE – Disqualification (other than DGM) not excludable under rule 90.3(b); DNF – Started but did not finish; DNS – Came to the start area but did not start; DSQ – Disqualified; RDG – Redress given; RET – Retired; SCP –Scoring penalty under rule 44.3; UFD – "U" flag disqualification; (X) – Discarded race not counted in the overall result;
