= Peter Newlands =

British sailor

Personal information
- Nationality: British
- Born: 31 October 1953 (age 71); Auckland, New Zealand

Sport
- Sport: Sailing

Peter Newlands (born 31 October 1953) is a British sailor. He competed in the 470 event at the 1984 Summer Olympics. He won the Contender World Championships four time in the 70s and 80s. During the 1990s he was the skipper of an Ultra 30 in its Grand Prix Series one of the first televised professional sailing events held in the UK and show on BBC. His working career alongside sailing was in the IT sector where he ran an IT hardware and software distribution company on the Isle of Wight.
