= 2018 29er World Championship =

19th 29er World Championship

Event title
- Name: 2018 29er World Championship
- Edition: 19th
- Sponsor: Zhik
- Host: Royal Hong Kong Yacht Club, Hong Kong

Event details
- Venue: Royal Hong Kong Yacht Club
- Dates: 30 December 2017 - 8 January 2018

Competitors
- Competitors: 116
- Competing nations: 14

Results
- (gold) Gold: Francesco Kayrouz; Jackson Keon
- (silver) Silver: Lachie Brewer; Max Paul
- (bronze) Bronze: Benjamin Jaffrezic; Leo Chauvel

The 2018 Zhik 29er World Championship was a sailing world championship that took place at the Royal Hong Kong Yacht Club, Hong Kong from 30 December 2017 to 8 January 2018. This was the 19th world championship for the 29er class.

== Summary ==
Reigning world champions Benji Daniel and Alex Burger of South Africa did not compete at these world championships. Francesco Kayrouz and Jackson Keon of New Zealand would go on to win the event and become world champions, while fellow New Zealanders Crystal Sun and Olivia Hobbs finished as first women.

== Results ==
Results are gold fleet only. Points have been carried across from previous days.

Results of individual races
Pos	Crew	Country	I	II	III	IV	V	Tot	Pts
Gold medal	Francesco Kayrouz; Jackson Keon	New Zealand	1	3	4^{†}	2	3	15	11
Silver medal	Lachie Brewer; Max Paul	Australia	12^{†}	1	2	12	1	32	20
Bronze medal	Benjamin Jaffrezic; Leo Chauvel	France	3	4	6	7	8^{†}	33	25
4	Theo Revil; Gautier Guevel	France	7^{†}	6	5	6	5	32	25
5	Sebastian Lardies; Scott McKenzie	New Zealand	2	5	10	1	15^{†}	41	26
6	Calum Gregor; Jon Crawford	Hong Kong	5	10	16^{†}	8	2	42	26
7	David Eastwood; Samuel Merson	United States	4	8^{†}	1	3	6	43	35
8	Rok Verderber; Klemen Semelbauer	Slovenia	14	21^{†}	12	4	4	61	41
9	Lewis Anderson; Pat Morgan	New Zealand	11	20^{†}	12	4	4	61	41
10	Vasilii Andreev; Leonid Pushev	Russia	8	7	8	10	18^{†}	64	46
11	Josh Berry; Tom Fyfe	New Zealand	18^{†}	11	9	5	11	65	47
12	Ripley Shelly; Severin Gramm	United States	19^{†}	2	3	13	10	70	51
13	Ben Paterson; Sean Paterson	New Zealand	9	12	11	17^{†}	9	68	51
14	Aristide Girou; Noah Chauvin	France	6	9	28^{†}	11	13	82	54
15	Henry Larkings; Miles Davey	Australia	21^{†}	13	14	21	14	95	74
16	William Bonin; Samuel Bonin	Canada	10	28^{†}	13	15	21	104	76
17	Pol Jacquin; Loic Tissier	China	15	16	23^{†}	18	12	109	86
18	Archie Cropley; Simon Murnaghan	Australia	20	18	22	26^{†}	17	117	91
19	Campbell Stanton; William Shapland	New Zealand	27^{†}	14	15	19	24	121	94
20	Duncan Gregor; Peter Backe	Hong Kong	13	23	19	25	27^{†}	123	96
21	Crystal Sun; Olivia Hobbs	New Zealand	24^{†}	17	17	14	22	120	96
22	Henry Wilson; Sam Morgan	New Zealand	28^{†}	15	27	23	16	128	100
23	Kieran Bucktin; Shannon Wright	Australia	16	24	21	20	25^{†}	126	101
24	Malo Kennish; Anatole Martin	Germany	17	22	24	27^{†}	20	128	101
25	Matthew Clark; Isamu Sakai	Hong Kong	23	19	18	29^{†}	19	136	107
26	Karrie Clark; Akira Sakai	Hong Kong	26	27	26	28^{†}	23	139	111
27	Charlie Hibben; Nicholas Hardy	United States	22	29^{†}	20	16	29	145	116
28	Oliver Aldridge; Millie Aldridge	Great Britain	25	26	29^{†}	22	26	152	123
29	Helena Sanderson; Jack Honey	New Zealand	29^{†}	25	25	24	28	158	129

Scoring system: low-point system

Legend: BFD – Black flag disqualification; DNC – Did not come to the starting area; DNF – Did not finish; DNS – Did not start; DSQ – Disqualified; RDG – Redress given; RET – Retired; STP – Standard penalty imposed; UFD – "U" flag disqualification; † – Discarded race not counted in the overall result;
