= Helsingfors Segelsällskap =

Yacht club in Helsinki, Finland

- Emblem

- Burgee for motorboats

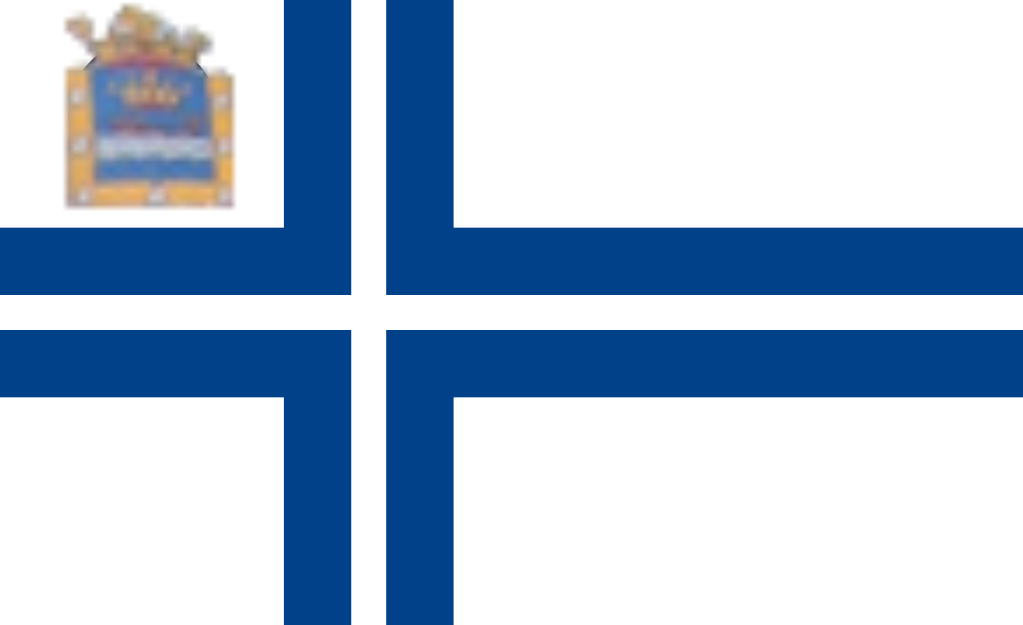
- Ensign
- Short name: HSS
- Founded: 1893; 133 years ago
- Location: Helsinki
- Commodore: Mikael Stelander
- Website: helsinkisailing.com/en/

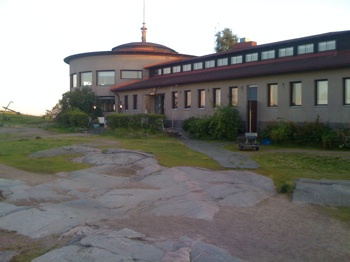
The Helsingfors Segelsällskap clubhouse on Liuskasaari outside Helsinki

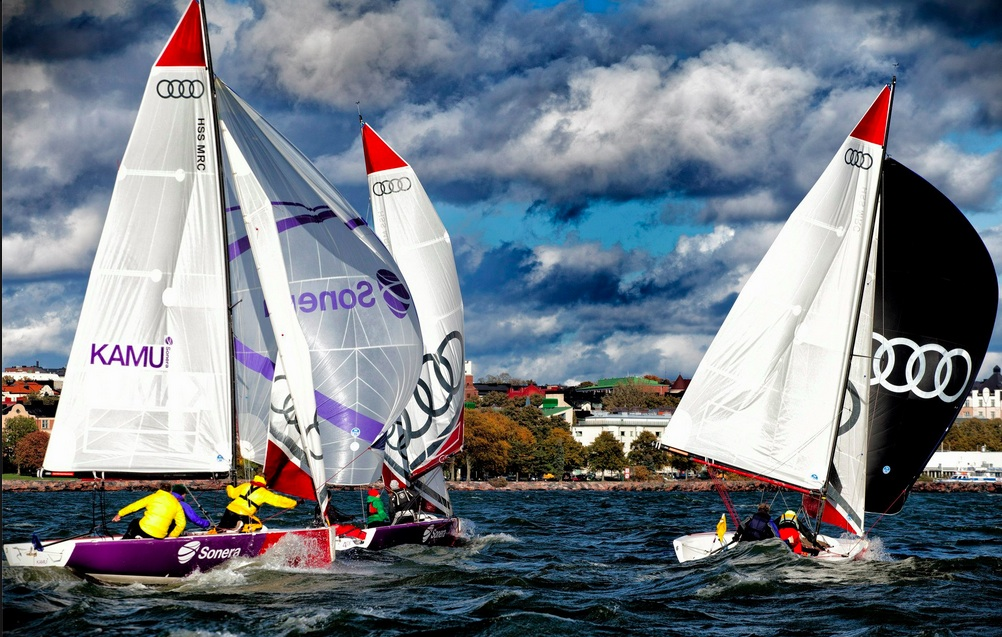
The Audi HSS Sailing Centre has a fleet of 24 boats including 6 Elliott 6m Match Race boats

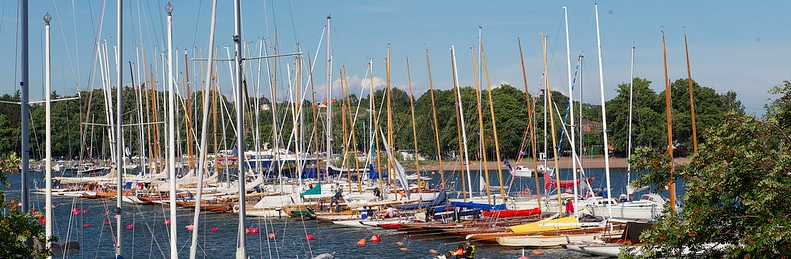
HSS harbors 60 classic yachts

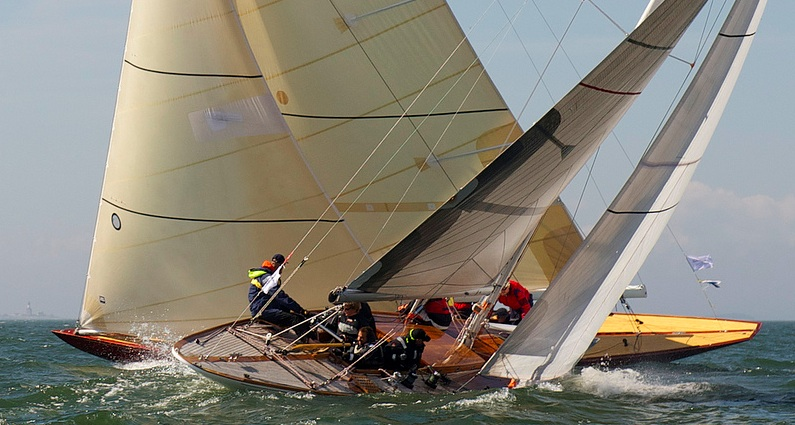
HSS has a fleet of eleven 8 metre–class classic yachts – the biggest in any yacht club in the world. Two of them are racing here in 2012, FIN 4 Sphinx and FIN 2 Sagitta

Helsingfors Segelsällskap r.f. (HSS; lit. 'Helsinki Sailing Society') is the second oldest yacht club in Helsinki, established in 1893. The yacht club has over 1,000 members and mainly sailboats in the register. The club is located on Liuskasaari island in the middle of southern Helsinki. Liuskasaari is a few minutes ferry ride away from Merisatamanranta. HSS hosts a popular full service guest harbor for 20 boats. The club also has a substantial contingent of expat sailors residing in Helsinki.

== History ==
Helsingfors Segelsällskap was founded in 1893. A clubhouse was built in 1897 at Liuskasaari and was destroyed by fire in 1946.

By the 1940s, it had reached 893 members. A new club house by Runar Finnilä was built on Liuskasaari and was opened to the 1952 Summer Olympics.

In the harbour at Liuskasaari, it has attracted the largest group of classical boats in the Nordic countries with 80 boats, as of 2014, and organises the Champagne Regatta.
