= Monique de Vries (sailor) =

Australian sailor (born 1995)

Personal information
- Born: 3 May 1995 (age 30) Perth, Western Australia

Sport
- Country: Australia

Sailing career
- Class(es): 470, 49erFX
- Club: South of Perth Yacht Club
- Coach: Belinda Stowell, Ruslana Taran, Victor Kovalenko

Monique de Vries (born 3 May 1995) is an Australian competitive sailor. She competed at the 2020 Summer Olympics in Tokyo, in the women's 470 class.

She and her fellow crew member, Nia Jerwood, qualified for the Tokyo 2020 Olympics by finishing 9th at the 470 World Championships in 2019. In the same year they were named Female Sailors of the Year at the Australian Yachtsman of the Year awards. Coached by Olympian Belinda Stowell, they represented Australia at the 2020 Summer Olympics in August 2021, finishing 16th in the field of 21. Detailed results.
