= Pwllheli Sailing Club =

Sailing club in Pwllheli, Wales

- Abbreviation: PSC
- Formation: 1958
- Type: Members' club
- Location: Pwllheli, Gwynedd, Wales.
- Official language: English, Welsh
- Main organ: Committee
- Affiliations: Royal Yachting Association
- Website: http://www.pwllhelisailingclub.co.uk

Pwllheli Sailing Club is a yacht club in Pwllheli, Wales, founded in 1958. Over the years its clubhouse has moved several times, and it has also become an organiser of national and international yachting and dinghy sailing events.

After a year's development Pwllheli Sailing Club has a new events centre (as of July 2015). The £8.5 million investment came from the European Union to help develop the area, and the academy has been a host to multiple events since its opening.

== Location ==
The club is located on the western side of the harbour near to the Glanydon Beach, and is within walking distance of the town. The club has dinghy storage compounds adjacent to the beach, and boats launch from the beach.

=== Harbour ===
The club overlooks the harbour and marina.

== Principal officers ==
Officers serve a two-year terms; the Vice Commodore becomes the Commodore and the Rear Commodore becomes the Vice Commodore.

== History ==
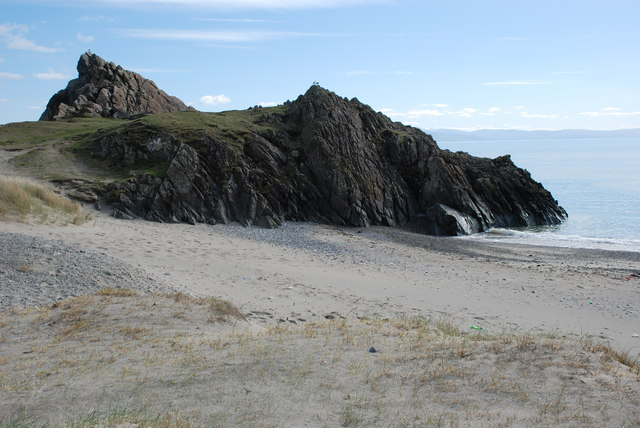
Carreg yr Imbill – Gimlet Rock Pwllheli

The club was founded in 1958 in temporary premises to the east of Carreg yr Imbill (Gimlet Rock). In the early days membership was shared with the Gimlet Rock Club, a social club which allowed members to drink alcohol on Sundays, which was not allowed in public houses at that time. As membership split from the Gimlet Rock Club it migrated into an extension to the GRC building, and had the use of dormitory rooms on the first floor, where the "Bridge" to manage races was also located.

The early membership had several Folkboats and Stellas, and races were hotly contested, with owners sailing to and from the South Caernarvonshire Yacht Club in Abersoch to compete in each other's races.

The club acquired two GP14s, Frisky and Heidi, for members to borrow, and located them in the roughly-surfaced dinghy park to the east, between the clubhouse and the derelict "Old Jetty", where there were twin slipways into the harbour. There was a dinghy racing programme from the early days of the club, but this was hampered by the need to borrow Jumbo, the boatyard workboat owned by Partington Marine, to act as safety boat. A seaward slipway was also installed from the dinghy park around 1970, though weather conditions meant this was rarely usable, both because it was very narrow, and because it was fringed by granite chunks from the old Gimlet Rock Quarry.

In the early 1970s Les Caddick, one of the earliest members, donated a small Dell Quay Dory and outboard, making the club self-sufficient for its safety boat. Though the major membership was for cruising and racing yachts, with many racing in the Irish Sea Offshore Racing Association's annual series, the dinghy side started to increase. There was an annual Long Distance Dinghy Race to Abersoch and back, for example, and the Merlin Rocket national championships were hosted – the first such dinghy championship at Pwllheli.

A partnership with New Quay Yacht Club created the annual passage race both from and to New Quay in Ceredigion, Mid Wales.

=== Founding members ===
Founding members are taken from the original Articles of Association

- Edwin Reginald Wilson, Optician
- Norman Timmins, general manager
- Charles William Martin, Garage Proprietor
- Thomas Linney, Hotelier (The Victoria Hotel)
- Norman Parry, director
- John Irwinne, director
- Col Owens, Builder & Contractor

An early, if not a founding, member was Alfred Walter (Bill) Maley of the Maley & Taunton engineering company of Wednesfield

=== Previous Commodores ===
- 2005/2006 Gareth Hughes-Jones

=== Clubhouse locations ===
- 1958 to c1980 – Shared premises with the Gimlet Rock Club
- c1980 to (unknown) – premises at the Gimlet Rock itself
- (unknown) to 1989 – Purpose-built premises opposite the lifeboat station. (Now the treatment plant)
- 1989 to 1997 – Marina Building
- 1997 to current – Current Building

In 1986 the club received funding from the Sports Lottery and the European Regional Development Fund to develop a Sailing and Events Centre.

== Events ==
Pwllheli Sailing Club is a host to national and international sailing events.

=== Past ===
- 2007 Cadet World Championships
- 2009 Mirror World Championships
- 2009 Splash World Championships Splash Worlds
- 2009 Topper Nationals

== Racing ==
The club hosts racing for local and visiting boats all year round. The races generally start from the bridge on the treatment plant building opposite the lifeboat station and take place around buoys in Cardigan Bay within a couple of miles of the start.

The club has a committee boat used to start and finish special regattas and a number of offshore races.

== Notable members ==
- Richard Tudor
