= Nia Jerwood =

Australian sailor

Personal information
- Full name: Nia Jannet Jerwood
- Born: 17 January 1998 (age 28) United Kingdom

Sailing career
- Country: Australia
- Sport: Sailing
- Club: Fremantle Sailing Club
- Classes: 470, 420, Optimist

Nia Jerwood (born 17 January 1998) is an Australian competitive sailor. She competed at the 2020 Summer Olympics in Tokyo, in the women's 470 class.

Jerwood and her fellow crew member, Monique de Vries, qualified for the Tokyo 2020 Olympics by finishing ninth at the 470 World Championships in 2019. In the same year they were named Female Sailors of the Year at the Australian Yachtsman of the Year awards. Coached by Olympian Belinda Stowell, they were selected to represent Australia at the 2020 Summer Olympics in April 2021, finishing 16th in the field of 21. Detailed results.

== Personal ==
Born in 1998 in Wales, Jerwood moved with her family to Perth three years later.
