= Liuskasaari =

Island in Helsinki, Finland

Coordinates: 60°09′03″N 024°56′54″E

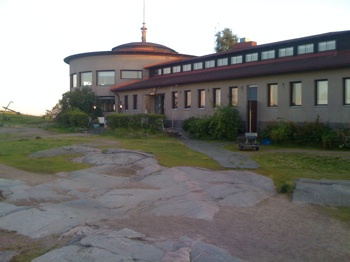
Helsingfors Segelsällskap Clubhouse

Liuskasaari (Swedish: Skifferholmen) is an island located south of Helsinki, Finland. To the north is the smaller Liuskaluoto, to the west is Sirpalesaari, and to the east is Uunisaari. Liuskasaari is part of the group of islands formed by these islands and those further east Haraka and Särkä .

Liuskasaari island is home to the Helsingfors Segelsällskap (HSS), one of the oldest sailing clubs in Finland. HSS's private harbour was built 300 years ago, and for 100 years the island has also hosted a guest harbout. The HSS clubhouse was designed by Runar Finnilä. HSS's guest marina also has a sauna, a septic tank emptying point, and laundry and drying facilities.

The island hosts two restaurants: The HSS Clubhouse Restaurant and the Skiffer outdoor restaurant. This island has about 50 000 visitors annually and can be reached by a ferry that traffics the island from the Merisatama park.

The island hosted some of the sailing events for the 1952 Summer Olympics.
