= Will Ryan (sailor) =

Australian sailor

Will Ryan OAM
Personal information
- Full name: William Ryan
- Nationality: Australian
- Born: 23 December 1988 (age 37) Lake Macquarie, New South Wales

Sailing career
- Sport: Sailing
Medal record
Olympic Games
Gold medal – first place	2020 Tokyo	470
Silver medal – second place	2016 Rio de Janeiro	470
World Championships
Gold medal – first place	2013 La Rochelle	470
Gold medal – first place	2014 Santander	470
Gold medal – first place	2015 Haifa	470
Gold medal – first place	2017 Thessaloniki	470
Gold medal – first place	2019 Enoshima	470
Bronze medal – third place	2016 San Isidro	470

William Ryan OAM (born 23 December 1988) is an Australian sailor and an Olympic champion and five time World champion in the men's 470 event with Mathew Belcher.

== Sailing career ==
Will Ryan experienced sailing when only two days old when he watched the 1988 Sydney to Hobart race in his grandfather's boat with his family. In his early years he was inspired by his grandfather and sailed in an old Sabot dinghy on Lake Macquarie in New South Wales. At the age of 11, Ryan competed in his first race with the Toronto Amateur Sailing Club.

Ryan competed in the Laser Radial class at the 2006 Youth Sailing World Championships. Two years later, Ryan, together with teammate Byron White, came second at the 2008 World Championships in the 29er class, finishing after fellow Australians Steven Thomas and Jasper Warren, and ahead of British team Max Richardson and Alex Groves who took the bronze.

In late 2012, Ryan teamed up with World champion Mathew Belcher, and less than a year later they the two won their first 470 World Championship at the 2013 event in La Rochelle. The team then continued to win the following two editions.

Ryan represented Australia at the 2016 Summer Olympics in Rio de Janeiro, Brazil. He and teammate Mathew Belcher won the silver medal in the 470 class. In the following years, Belcher and Ryan also won the 2017 and 2019 470 World Championships.

Ryan and Belcher returned for the 2020 Summer Olympics in Tokyo, Japan, where they won the gold medal in the 470 class.

Ryan joined the Switzerland SailGP team in 2023, initially in a coaching role, later as a wingtrimmer. He became a reserve sailor for Australia SailGP Team in early 2025.

== Personal life ==
Ryan's sister is Jaime Ryan who also competed at the Tokyo 2020 Olympics, where she sailed in the women's 49er FX event.

== Career highlights ==
World Championships
2008 – Sorrento, (silver) 2nd, 29er (with Byron White)

Olympic Games
2016 – Rio de Janeiro, (silver) 2nd, 470 (with Mathew Belcher)
2020 – Tokyo, (gold) 1st, 470 (with Mathew Belcher)

== Recognition ==
- 2013 – Australian Sailing Awards – Male Sailor of the Year (with Mathew Belcher)
- 2013 – Australian Institute of Sport Awards – Team of the Year (with Mathew Belcher)
- 2014 – Australian Sailing Awards – Male Sailor of the Year (with Mathew Belcher)
- 2015 – Australian Sailing Awards – Male Sailor of the Year (with Mathew Belcher)
- 2019 – Australian Sailing Awards – Male Sailor of the Year (with Mathew Belcher)
- 2019 – Australian Institute of Sport Awards – Team of the Year (with Mathew Belcher)
- 2021 – Australian Sailing Awards – Male Sailor of the Year (with Mathew Belcher)
- 2022 – Australia Day Honours – Medal of the Order of Australia
