= Byron White (sailor) =

Australian sailor

Byron White is an Australian sailor.

Together with teammate William Ryan White became second at the 2008 World Championships in the 29er boat by finishing behind fellow Australians Steven Thomas and Jasper Warren, but in front of Britons Max Richardson and Alex Groves who took the bronze.

== Career highlights ==
World Championships
2008 – Sorrento, (silver) 2nd, 29er (with William Ryan)
