= Adrienne Cahalan =

Australian sailor

Adrienne Cahalan OAM (born 1964) was the only woman competing in the 2005–06 Volvo Ocean Race. She is a qualified lawyer and had a master's degree in Applied Meteorology.

Adrienne grew up on the Lane Cove River (part of Port Jackson) in Australia. After learning how to sail as a teenager, she began to race lasers and was a member of the twelve-foot skiff club. Since then Adrienne has been part of the Cheyenne crew which broke the Round the World World Speed Record in 2004; she has circumnavigated the globe on several projects, and has had four World Yachtswoman of the Year nominations. This is all with also having experience in three Volvo Ocean Races (formerly known as the Whitbread Round the World Race) prior to her race in the 2005–2006 Volvo Ocean Race. Her education was at Marist Sisters' College, Woolwich, an all girl secondary school in the suburbs of Sydney. She came and gave a speech to her old school (11 March 2015) as an alumni and ex student. Some of her words were; "33 years ago, I sat in those seats. When I sat there I didn't know I would leave and become a professional sailor and maritime lawyer." She told them what she has achieved after stepping out of those doors of high school. She told them that she has set a world record for going around the world on a yacht in less than 64 days. She said she once told her crew when they were absolutely exhausted, "If you don't try now and we lose that world record by one second, you will never forgive yourself but if you put everything into it, then you know you've done what could be done to complete it".

She has been the navigator on four line honours winners in the Sydney to Hobart Yacht Race including Wild Oats.

Cahalan was awarded Medal of the Order of Australia (OAM) in the 2019 Queen's Birthday Honours for service to sailing.

In October 2019 Cahalan was inducted to the Australian Sailing Hall of Fame.

== Bibliography ==
- Adrienne Cahalan. Around the Buoys: Champion Yachtswoman and Navigator. Random House.
