= Gimlet (restaurant) =

- Interactive map of Gimlet

Restaurant information
- Established: 2020
- Owner: Andrew McConnell
- Head chef: Edison Tan (June 2026-)
- Location: Corner of Flinders Lane and Russell Street
- Coordinates: 37.81588786°S 144.96933073°E

Gimlet is an Australian restaurant.

== Description ==
The restaurant is set up within Cavendish House, a heritage listed building in Melbourne. It has been described as a 'society restaurant'. The interior of the restaurant contains Thonet chairs, Murano lights, and antique furniture.

The menu is described as 'mature' with 'no faddish shokupan sandos or Insta-bait' .

Reviewer Gemima Cody has praised in particular the venue's preparation of vegetable based dishes.

== Reception ==
In a 2020 review of the restaurant, Gemima Cody of the Sydney Morning Herald generally praised the restaurant, but declined to give it a review score as 'scoring is paused while the industry gets back onto its feet' due to the COVID-19 pandemic.
