= Carreg yr Imbill =

Former quarry and holiday village in UK

Coordinates: 52.8816°N 4.3996°W

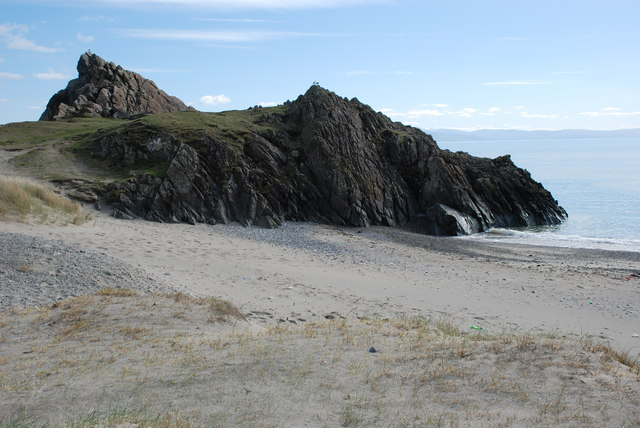
Carreg yr Imbill - Gimlet Rock Pwllheli

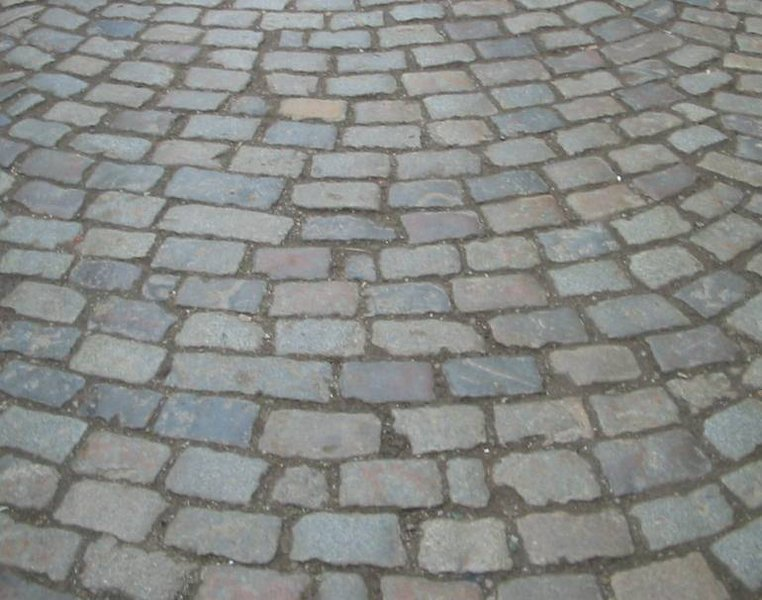
Commonly mis-labelled as "cobblestones", this is a road paved with setts

Carreg yr Imbill is the remains of a large dolerite with pegmatite pods and quarry at Pwllheli, Gwynedd, Wales.

The dolerite was mined by the Liverpool and Pwllheli Granite Company (sometimes known as the Pwllheli Granite Company), which used the diorite for stone setts to pave the streets.

The worked out quarry forms the basis for a large holiday village which is run by the Haulfryn Group, the same company that runs The Warren in Abersoch.
