= Canadian Olympic-training Regatta, Kingston =

Non-profit volunteer organization

The Canadian Olympic Regattas Kingston (CORK) is a non-profit volunteer organization located at Portsmouth Olympic Harbour, home of Sail Canada, producing annual olympic multi-class sailing regattas held off the shores of Kingston, Ontario, Canada.
