= Portsmouth Olympic Harbour =

Harbour in Kingston, Ontario, Canada

Coordinates: 44.219°N 76.516°W

Portsmouth Olympic Harbour is a harbour located in Kingston, Ontario. The harbour was redeveloped for the sailing events of the 1976 Summer Olympics in Montreal.

Portsmouth Harbour, originally known as Hatter's Bay, was constructed in the 1800s as a convenient means of providing supplies and transporting prisoners to Kingston Penitentiary. It was significantly modified and refurbished in 1974 and 1975. The Canadian Olympic-training Regatta, Kingston (CORK), a non-profit volunteer organization was a key element in bringing the 1976 Olympics to Kingston. Since then, the harbour has been a venue for annual Olympic-quality sailing events.
