= Steven Thomas (sailor) =

Australian sailor

Sailing career
- Sport: Sailing
- Club: Royal Perth Yacht Club
- Coached by: Emmett Lazich, Australia
Medal record
Sailing
Representing Australia
World Championships
Gold medal – first place	2008 Sorrento	29er
Gold medal – first place	2009 Riva del Garda	29er

Steven Thomas is an Australian sailor.

Together with teammate Jasper Warren Thomas became the 2008 World Champion in the 29er boat by finishing in front of fellow Australians Byron White and William Ryan.

== Career highlights ==
World Championships
2008 – Sorrento, (gold) 1st, 29er (with Jasper Warren)
