= Jasper Warren =

Australian sailor

Jasper "Fang" Warren (born 13 September 1989) is an Australian sailor.

Together with teammate Steven Thomas, Warren became the 2008 World Champion in the 29er boat by finishing in front of fellow Australians Byron White and William Ryan.

== Career highlights ==
World Championships
2008 - Sorrento, (gold) 1st, 29er (with Steven Thomas)
