= 420 World Championships =

Boat race

The 420 World Championships is an annual international sailing regattas in the 420 class organized by the International 420 Class Association and recognised by World Sailing. They have been held every year since 1973 the year in which the class gained status from World Sailing.

The 420 Team Racing World Championship is a sailing regattas in the 420 class organized by the International 420 Class Association and recognised by World Sailing.

The 420 (dinghy) has also been used in Youth Sailing World Championships Formerly (IYRU Youth World, ISAF Youth Worlds) and the IYRU Women's Sailing World Championships and in Team Racing World Championships.

== Editions ==
Ed.			Hosts			Fleet	Sailor			Boats				Ref.
No	Day/Month	Year	Host club	City	Country	Fleet	No.	Nat.	Cont.	Boats			Mix	Ref.
N/A		1966		Palamós	Spain	Open								
N/A		1967		Kingston	Canada	Open								
N/A		1969		Sandhamn	Sweden	Open								
N/A		1970		Tel Aviv	Israel	Open								
N/A		1971		Cherbourg	France	Open								
1		1973	Brighton & Seacliff Yacht Club	Adelaide	Australia	Open								
2		1974		Kiel	West Germany	Open								
3		1975		Medemblik	Netherlands	Open								
4		1976		Barrington	United States	Open								
5		1977		Baiona	Spain	Open								
6		1978		Copenhagen	Denmark	Open								
7		1979		Tróia	Portugal	Open								
8		1980		Quiberon	France	Open								
9		1981		Adelaide	Australia	Open								
10		1982	Hayling Island Sailing Club	Hayling Island	United Kingdom	Open								
11	15–27 August	1983		Nahariya	Israel	Open								
12	2–13 July	1984		Annapolis	United States	Open								
13	11–18 August	1985		Ancona	Italy	Open								
14F	5–10 July	1986		IJsselmeer (women)	Netherlands	Female								
14	16–30 July	1986		Nieuwpoort	Belgium	Open								
15F	30 April – 9 May	1987		Cervia	Italy	Female								
15	20–29 July	1987		Lake Balaton (open)	Hungary	Open								
16	8–15 January	1988		Lake Macquarie	Australia	Open								
16F	9–15 July	1988		Lake Thun	Switzerland	Female								
17		1988		Belmont	Australia	Open								
18		1989		Mošćenička Draga	Yugoslavia	Open								
19		1990		Crozon-Morgat	France	Open								
20		1991		Rimini	Italy	Open								
21		1992		Sdot Yam	Israel	Open								
22		1993		Marstrand	Sweden	Open								
23		1994		Plymouth	United Kingdom	Open								
24		1995		Fremantle	Australia	Open								
25		1996		Blankenberge	Belgium	Open								
26		1997		Newport	United States	Open								
27	13–21 July	1998		Palamós	Spain	Open								
27F	26–31 July	1998		Galaxidi	Greece	Female								
28	16–24 July	1999	Nautical Club of Paleon Faliron	Athens	Greece	Open								
29	13–21 July	2000		La Rochelle	France	Open								
30	19–27 July	2001	Marina di Ravenna	Ravenna	Italy	Male/Mixed	200	21	5	100				
30	19–27 July	2001	Marina di Ravenna	Ravenna	Italy	Female	109	17	4	54				
31		2002		Tavira	Portugal	Male/Mixed	166	22	5	83				
31		2002		Tavira	Portugal	Female	130	21	4	65				
32	Jul	2003	Hayling Island Sailing Club	Hayling Island	United Kingdom	Male/Mixed	172	19	5	86				
32	Jul	2003	Hayling Island Sailing Club	Hayling Island	United Kingdom	Female	118	14	5	59				
33	26Dec -11Jan	2003/04	Mornington Yacht Club	Melbourne, Victoria	Australia	Male/Mixed	128	13	5	64				
33	26Dec -11Jan	2003/04	Mornington Yacht Club	Melbourne, Victoria	Australia	Female	92	11	4	46	-	46	-	
34	27Jul -5Aug	2005	Société des Régates de Brest		France	Male/Mixed	194	20	5	97				
34	27Jul -5Aug	2005	Société des Régates de Brest		France	Female	136	21	5	68	-	68	-	
35	28Jul -6Aug	2006	Real Club Nautico de Gran Canaria		Spain	Male/Mixed	182	17	5	91				
35	28Jul -6Aug	2006	Real Club Nautico de Gran Canaria		Spain	Female	150	18	5	75	-	75	-	
36	31Dec -9Jan	2006/07	Takapuna Boating Club		New Zealand	Male/Mixed	134	15	5	67				
36	31Dec -9Jan	2006/07	Takapuna Boating Club		New Zealand	Female	98	11	6	49	-	49	-	
37	22–31 July	2008	Olympic Sailing Centre: Marina Delta Falirou	Athens	Greece	Male/Mixed	202	25	5	101				
37	22–31 July	2008	Olympic Sailing Centre: Marina Delta Falirou	Athens	Greece	Female	154	19	5	77	-	77	-	
38	27 Jul –5 Aug	2009	Fraglia Vela Riva	Lake Garda	Italy	Male/Mixed	244	29	5	122				
38	27 Jul –5 Aug	2009	Fraglia Vela Riva	Lake Garda	Italy	Female	168	20	5	84	-	84	-	
39	22–31 July	2010	Haifa Sailing Club	Haifa	Israel	Male/Mixed	166	21	6	83				
39	22–31 July	2010	Haifa Sailing Club	Haifa	Israel	Female	148	17	5	74	-	74	-	
40	27 Dec –5 Jan	2010/11	Yacht Club Argentino	Buenos Aires	Argentina	Male/Mixed	112	16	4	56				
40	27 Dec –5 Jan	2010/11	Yacht Club Argentino	Buenos Aires	Argentina	Female	82	13	5	41	-	41	-	
41	27 Jul – 5 Aug	2012	Austrian National Sailing; Training Institute	Neusiedl am See	Austria	Male/Mixed	216	25	5					
41	27 Jul – 5 Aug	2012	Austrian National Sailing; Training Institute	Neusiedl am See	Austria	Female	142	20	4	71	-	71	-	
42	22–30 July	2013	Real Club Náutico Valencia	Valencia	Spain	Male/Mixed	220	26	5	110				
42	22–30 July	2013	Real Club Náutico Valencia	Valencia	Spain	Female	154	19	6	76	-	76	-	
43	25Jul –3Aug	2014	Lübecker Yacht Club	Travemünde	Germany	Male/Mixed	222	26	5	111				
43	25Jul –3Aug	2014	Lübecker Yacht Club	Travemünde	Germany	Female	166	21	5	83	-	83	-	
44	17–25 July	2015	Saga Prefecture Yacht Harbour	Karatsu	Japan	Male/Mixed	144	21	5	72		-		
44	17–25 July	2015	Saga Prefecture Yacht Harbour	Karatsu	Japan	Female	120	16	5	60	-	60	-	
44	17–25 July	2015	Saga Prefecture Yacht Harbour	Karatsu	Japan	Open U17	66	10	5	33				
45	15–23 July	2016	Yacht Club Sanremo	Sanremo	Italy	Male/Mixed	220	23	5	110				
45	15–23 July	2016	Yacht Club Sanremo	Sanremo	Italy	Female	168	21	5	84	-	84	-	
45	15–23 July	2016	Yacht Club Sanremo	Sanremo	Italy	Open U17	138	19	5	68				
46	26Dec – 3 Jan	2017/18	Fremantle Sailing Club	Fremantle	Australia	Male/Mixed	128	15	3	64				
46	26Dec – 3 Jan	2017/18	Fremantle Sailing Club	Fremantle	Australia	Female	78	10	4	39	-	39	-	
46	26Dec – 3 Jan	2017/18	Fremantle Sailing Club	Fremantle	Australia	Open U17	82	9	3	41	22	18	1	
47	7–15 Aug	2018	Sail Newport	Newport	United States	Male/Mixed	144	14	5	73				
47	7–15 Aug	2018	Sail Newport	Newport	United States	Female	104	15	4	52	-	52	-	
47	7–15 Aug	2018	Sail Newport	Newport	United States	Open U17	84	11	4	42	23	18	1	
48	3–11 July	2019	Capable Planet Club Nautico	Vilamoura	Portugal	Male/Mixed	178	19	5	89				
48	3–11 July	2019	Capable Planet Club Nautico	Vilamoura	Portugal	Female	146	18	5	73	-	73	-	
48	3–11 July	2019	Capable Planet Club Nautico	Vilamoura	Portugal	Open U17	132	19	6	66				
N/A	3-11 Jul	2020	Centre Nautique Crozon Morgat	Crozon Morgat	France	CANCELLED COVID								
49	2–10 July	2021	Yacht Club Sanremo	Sanremo	Italy	Male/Mixed	180	19	4	90		-		
49	2–10 July	2021	Yacht Club Sanremo	Sanremo	Italy	Female	106	17	4	53	-	53		
49	2–10 July	2021	Yacht Club Sanremo	Sanremo	Italy	Open U17	134	12	3	67				
50	5–13 Aug	2022	Balatoni Yacht Club	Alsóörs	Hungary	Male/Mixed	222	20	5	111		-		
50	5–13 Aug	2022	Balatoni Yacht Club	Alsóörs	Hungary	Female	122	18	5	61	-	61	-	
50	5–13 Aug	2022	Balatoni Yacht Club	Alsóörs	Hungary	Open U17	144	15	2	72	35	27	10	
51	21–29 July	2023	Real Club de Regatas de Alicante	Alicante	Spain	Male/Mixed	260	21	5	130	87	-	43	
51	21–29 July	2023	Real Club de Regatas de Alicante	Alicante	Spain	Female	128	17	5	64	-	64	-	
51	21–29 July	2023	Real Club de Regatas de Alicante	Alicante	Spain	Open U17	166	18	4	83	43	24	16	
52	3–10 Jan	2024	Iate Clube do Rio de Janeiro		Brazil	Male/Mixed	156	14	3	78	51	-	27	
52	3–10 Jan	2024	Iate Clube do Rio de Janeiro		Brazil	Female	54	10	2	27	-	27	-	
53	1–9 Jul	2025		Urla, İzmir	Turkey	Male/Mixed	202	20	5	101	72	-	29	
53	1–9 Jul	2025		Urla, İzmir	Turkey	Female	84	11	3	42	-	42	-	
53	1–9 Jul	2025		Urla, İzmir	Turkey	Open U17	148	13	3	74	31	24	19	
54	6–11 Jul	2026	Centre Nautique Biscarrosse Olympique	Biscarrosse	France	Male/Mixed	294	25	5	147	69	-	60	
54	6–11 Jul	2026	Centre Nautique Biscarrosse Olympique	Biscarrosse	France	Female	98	18	3	49	-	49	-	
54	6–11 Jul	2026	Centre Nautique Biscarrosse Olympique	Biscarrosse	France	Open U17	216	16	3	108	51	32	25	

=== Class Team Racing Worlds ===
Year	Dates	Host Club	Location	Winning team	Ref
2015	9-12 Sept	Circolo Vela Gargnano	Italy	Spain	
2016	31 Aug-3 Sept	Circolo Vela Gargnano	Italy	Spain	
2017	23-26 Aug	Circolo Vela Gargnano	Italy	Event cancelled	

== Medalists ==
=== Open ===
Year	Gold	Silver	Bronze
1973 Adelaide	Australia; Wangel; Giles		
1974 Kiel	France; Alain Chourgnoz; Denis Cerda		
1975 Medemblik	United States; Whitehurst; Whitehurst	France; Russo; Narbonne	Netherlands; Carels; Ponjée
1976 Barrington	United States; Stephen Taylor; Joan Massey		
1977 Baiona	United States; Stephen Taylor; Joan Massey	Israel	
1978 Jyllinge	France; Pollet; Johanssen	Great Britain; Cathy Foster; Wendy Hilder	Spain; Sallent; Isnard
1979 Tróia	Italy; Di Salle; Vassalo	West Germany; Möller; Möller	New Zealand; Dickson; Wilcox
1980 Quiberon	Israel; Shimshon Brokman; Eitan Friedlander	France; Brenac; Mikuelis	France; Jaffrezeic; Berthonneau
1982 Adelaide	Australia; Ferris; McKay	United States; Brown	West Germany; Etten
1984 Annapolis	West Germany; A. Andruleit; H. Andruleit	West Germany; Filimonow; Stöckmann	Canada; Ellis; Ferrow
1986 Nieuwpoort	France; Eric Godard; Christophe Godard		
1987 Balatonfüred	France; Jean-François Berthet; Gwendoel Berthet	France; Eric Godard; Christophe Godard	Spain; José Miguel Ramis; Antonio Morro
1988 Lake Macquarie	France; W. Sanchez-Diez; Bertrand Dumortier	West Germany; Christian Halm; Alexander Halm	France; Jean-François Berthet; Gwendoel Berthet
1989 Mošćenička Draga	France; David Ravet; Bertrand Loyal	Great Britain; Steve Irish; Greg Irish	Great Britain; John Merricks; Rob Wilson
1990 Crozon	France; Christian Gout; Jean Gout		
1991 Rimini	Great Britain; Steve Irish; Greg Irish		
1992 Caesarea	Spain; Gustavo Martínez; Dimias Wood		
1993 Marstrand	Italy; Marcello Luciani; Dario Luciani		
1994 Plymouth	Great Britain; John Merricks; Ian Lovering		
1995 Fremantle	Australia; Roger Perrett; Teague Czislowski		
1996 Blankenberge	Portugal; M. Fortunato; M. Nunes		
1997 Newport	France; W. Sanchez-Diez; Gabriol	Italy; L. Chiarugi; E. Trumpy	
1998 Palamós	France; Nicolas Charbonnier; David Deguine		

=== Men and Mixed ===
Year	Gold	Silver	Bronze	Ref.
1999	France; Nicolas Charbonnier; David Deguine	France; Jean-Matthieu Constant; Christopher Pratt	Portugal; Pedro Pinto; Miguel Pinto	
2000	Australia; Mathew Belcher; Daniel Belcher	Italy; Luca Bursic; Thomas Jacob	Greece; Mileos Michaelis; Theodores Polighrondis	
2001	Italy; Michel Mazzotti; Giulia Mazzotti	Spain; R. Medina; J. Cerezo	Italy; B. Danti; F. Geggio	
2002	India; Farokh Tarapore; Vikas Kapila	Great Britain; Nic Asher; Elliot Willis	France; Morgan Lagravière; Noé Delpech	
2003	Spain; José Antonio Medina; Onán Barreiros	France; Nicolas Duron; Sébastian Durand	France; Morgan Lagravière; Noé Delpech	
2004	Australia; Nathan Wilmot; Malcolm Page	Australia; Mathew Belcher; Rike Ziegelmayer	Australia; Nathan Outteridge; Ayden Menzies	
2005	Portugal; Tomas da Silva; Francisco Gomes	Italy; Alfredo Capodanno; Vittorio Papa	Spain; Pablo Santurde; Abelardo Quevedo	
2006	New Zealand; Carl Evans; Peter Burling	New Zealand; Simon Cooke; Scott Illingworth	France; Fernando Lodos; Julien Pulve	
2007	New Zealand; Carl Evans; Peter Burling	New Zealand; Simon Cooke; Scott Illingworth	New Zealand; Rowan Swanson; Bruce Kennedy	
2008	Greece; Michalis Mileos; Evangelos-Vasileio Mitakis	Greece; Vasilis Papoutsoglou; Akilas Drougas	Italy; Edoardo Mancinelli; Lorenzo de Felice	
2009	Greece; Antonios Tsimpoukelis; George Karonis	New Zealand; Francisco Lardies; Finn Drummond	Great Britain; Ben Palmer; Konrad Weaver	
2010	Singapore; Justin Liu; Sherman Cheng	Italy; Francesco Falcetelli; Gabriele Franciolini	Italy; Edoardo Mancinelli; Leonardo Cucchiara	
2011	Argentina; Pablo Völker; Agustín Cunill	Italy; Edoardo Mancinelli; Leonardo Cucchiara	Chile; Benjamín Grez; Diego González	
2012	Greece; Alex Kavas; George Kavas	France; Guillaume Pirouelle; Valentin Sipan	Spain; David Charles; Alex Charles	
2013	Spain; Xavier Antich; Pedro Terrones	Brazil; Tiago Brito; Andrei Kneipp	France; Sébastien Simon; Pierre Rhimbault	
2014	Spain; José Manuel Ruiz; Fernando Dávila	France; Hippolyte Macheti; Sidoine Dantes	Israel; Ido Bilik; Ofek Shalgi	
2015	Japan; Daichi Takayama; Syota Nakano	United States; Wiley Rogers; Jack Parkin	Hong Kong; Calum Gregor; Hugo Christensson	
2016	Portugal; Diogo Costa; Pedro Costa	United States; Wiley Rogers; Jack Parkin	Greece; Vasilios Gourgiotis; Orestis Batsis	
2017	Spain; Enrique Luján; Pablo Luján	Spain; Albert Torres; Francisco Mulet	Spain; Carlos Balaguer; Antoni Massanet	
2018	New Zealand; Seb Menzies; Blake McGlashan	Spain; Elías Aretz; Pablo García	Spain; Martín Wizner; Pedro Ameneiro	
2019	Spain; Martín Wizner; Pedro Ameneiro	New Zealand; Seb Menzies; Blake McGlashan	Spain; Conrad Konitzer; Fernando Rodríguez	
2020	CANCELLED DUE TO COVID			
2021	USA 57002 (95); Tommy Sitzmann (USA); Luke Woodworth (USA)	FRA 56984 (16); Ange Delerce (FRA); Timothee Rossi (FRA)	ESP 56600 (11); Alberto Morales (ESP); Miguel Bethencourt (ESP)	
2022	ESP 57147 (12); Fernando Flethes Anaya (ESP); Carlos Flethes Anaya (ESP)	ESP 55249 (11); Sebastián Riquelme Beckmann (ESP); Miquel Perez Carbó (ESP)	ESP 56790 (9); Ian Clive Walker March (ESP); Finn Dicke (ESP)	
2023	ESP 56005 (4); Pol Mateu Badia (ESP); Alejandro De Maqua Xalabarder (ESP)	ESP 56918 (14); Miguel Angel Morales (ESP); Alejandro Martin (ESP)	GRE 56946 (28); Dimitris Sourlatzis (GRE); Nikolaos Sourlatzis (GRE)	
2024	BRA 57305 (69); Lucas Freitas (BRA); Victoria Back (BRA)	ITA 57283 (87); Lisa Vucetti (ITA); Vittorio Bonifacio (ITA)	NZL 56941 (141); Joe Leith (NZL); Joshua Ferrissey (NZL)	
2025	BRA 57717; Said Royo (BRA); Bernardo Oliveira (BRA)	GRE 56678; Sokratis Chamarias (GRE); Iason Xypas (GRE)	ITA 57681; Emanuele Collia (ITA); Gianmaria Biason (ITA)	
2026	GRE 57822; Jason Panagopoulos (GRE); Fevronia Bouzana (GRE)	GRE 57840; Sokratis Chamarias (GRE); Iason Xypas (GRE)	GRE 57590; Ioannis Tournis (GRE); Kyriakos Zaponidis (GRE)	

=== Women ===
Year	Gold	Silver	Bronze	Ref.
1980 Charlottenlund	Italy; Claudia Mazzaferro; Galeazzi			
1981	Italy; Claudia Mazzaferro; Galeazzi			
1986 Nieuwpoort	Italy; M. Bazzini; D. De Cagno			
1987 Cervia	France; V. Ravet; D. Besson			
1988	Spain; Leon; Leon			
1989	Sweden; Martina Wendin; Boel Bengtsson			
1990 Miura	France; Céline Hendrick; Catherine Condolf			
1991 Rimini	France; Marie LeCadre; Laure Fernandez			
1998 Galaxidi	Israel; Limor Kliger; Vered Buskila			
1999 Athens	Greece; Dimitra Milona; Aliki Kourkoulou			
2000 La Rochelle	Great Britain; Christina Bassedone; Helen Mayhew	Greece; Altana Danezi; Evagelia Vlachov	Italy; Elena Ziliani; Alessandra Marenzi	
2001 Ravenna	Italy; Elisabetta Sacchegiani; Maria Paola Bertone	Italy; Sara Postogna; Anna Postogna	Italy; Carolina Mariani; Camilla Gabrielli	
2002 Tavira	France; Caroline Jonet; Magali Pallanca	Greece; Spiridoula Mileou; Sofia Papadopoulou	Brazil; Isabel Barzaghi; Laura Zani	
2003 Hayling Island	Brazil; Isabel Barzaghi; Laura Zani	Great Britain; Charlotte Savage; Maia Walsh	Germany; Dorothea Gebert; Natascha Lorenz	
2004 Mornington	Australia; Elise Rechichi; Tessa Parkinson	Great Britain; Lucy MacGregor; Nicola MacGregor	France; Camille Lecointre; Gwendolyn Lemaitre	
2005 Brest	Italy; Maria Stella Turizio; Maria Carolina Rendano	France; Marie Lumeau; Claire Bossard	Great Britain; Maria Stanley; Catherine Alton	
2006 Las Palmas	Great Britain; Hannah Mills; Peggy Webster	Spain; Tara Pacheco; Elena Barambio	Italy; Benedetta Danti; Elisa Cecconi	
2007 Auckland	New Zealand; Jo Aleh; Polly Powrie	New Zealand; Shelley Hesson; Bianca Barbarich-Bacher	New Zealand; Sarah Bilkey; Rosie Sargisson	
2008 Athens	Greece; Katerina Kaitatzidou; Sofia Kaitatzidou	Israel; Gil Cohen; Adva Kremer	Greece; Afrodite Kyranakou; Elena Nikiforidi	
2009 Lake Garda	New Zealand; Alex Maloney; Bianca Barbarich-Bacher	Italy; Camilla Marino; Claudia Soricelli	United States; Sydney Bolger; Caitlin Beavers	
2010 Haifa	Italy; Roberta Caputo; Benedetta Barbiero	United States; Morgan Kiss; Katia Da Silva	Italy; Christina Celli; Silvia Morini	
2011 Buenos Aires	Great Britain; Annabel Vose; Megan Brickwood	Germany; Nadine Bohm; Monika Lindner	France; Maelenn Lemaitre; Aloïse Retornaz	
2012 Lake Neusiedl	Singapore; Rachel Lee; Cecilia Low	Chile; Nadja Horwitz; Sofia Middleton	Singapore; Griselda Khng; Shu Xian Lee	
2013 Valencia	Great Britain; Annabel Cattermole; Bryony Bennett-Lloyd	Singapore; Kimberly Lim; Savannah Siew	United States; Sara Scotto Di Vettimo; Vittoria Barbiero	
2014 Lübeck	Italy; Carlotta Omari; Francesca Russo Cirillo	Singapore; Kimberly Lim; Savannah Siew	Greece; Aikaterini Tavoulari; Fotini Koutsoumpou	
2015 Karatsu	Spain; Marta Garrido; María Jesus Dávila	France; Charlotte Yven; Marine Riou	Japan; Misaki Tanaka; Sena Takano	
2016 Sanremo	Italy; Francesca Russo Cirillo; Alice Linussi	Spain; María Bover Guerrero; Clara Llabrés	Italy; Maria Vittoria Marchesini; Cecilia Fedel	
2017 Fremantle	Australia; Nia Jerwood; Monique de Vries	Australia; Laura Harding; Eleanor Grimshaw	Italy; Arianna Passamonti; Giulia Fava	
2018 Newport	Spain; Patricia Reino; Isabel Laiseca	Spain; María Caba; Pilar Caba	Spain; María Bover; Catalina Homar	
2019 Vilamoura	Great Britain; Vita Heathcote; Milly Boyle	Italy; Irene Calici; Petra Gregori	Greece; Melina Pappa; Maria Tsamopoulou	
2020	DUE TO CANCELLED COVID			
2021	USA 56364; Vanessa Lahrkamp (USA); Katherine Mcnamara (USA)	ESP 56769; Neus Ballester (ESP); Andrea Perello (ESP)	FRA 56876; Apolline Benoit (FRA); Ambre Monnier (FRA)	
2022	FRA 56864; Solenza Mariani (FRA); Antea Mariani (FRA)	ESP 56852; María Perelló Mora (ESP); Marta Cardona Alcantara (ESP)	GER 57113; Beeke Segger (GER); Siri Segger (GER)	
2023	GRE 56470; Iakovina Kerkezou (GRE); Danae Giannouli (GRE)	BRA 54643; Joana Gonçalves (BRA); Gabriela Vassel (BRA)	ESP 57332; Nora García de la Casa (ESP); Mariona Ventura (ESP)	
2024	GRE 56470; Iakovina Kerkezou (GRE); Danai Giannouli (GRE)	ESP 56958; Paula Laiseca (ESP); Isabel Laiseca (ESP)	BRA 54643; Joana Gonçalves (BRA); Gabriela Vassel (BRA)	
2025	ESP 57718; Neus Fernández (ESP); Martina Gomila (ESP)	GRE 57547; Georgia Faviou (GRE); Amalia Papanikita (GRE)	TUR 57634; Zeynep Çaçur (TUR); Zeynep Ela Köy (TUR)	
2026	BRA 57764; Joana Freitas (BRA); Antônia Gick (BRA)	GRE 57062; Athina Soulioti (GRE); Danae Miranta Angelopoulou (GRE)	ESP 57548; Beatriz Quintana (ESP); Savina Vicens (ESP)	

=== Under 17 ===
Year	Gold	Silver	Bronze
2015	Edoardo Ferraro (ITA); Francesco Orlando (ITA)	Aggelos Arvanitis (GRE); Theofanis Kanakaris (GRE)	Carlos Balaguer (ESP); Ignacio Balaguer (ESP)
2016	Telis Athanasopoulos (GRE); Dimitris Tassios (GRE)	Eduard Ferrer (ESP); Carlos de Maqua (ESP)	Enzo Balanger (FRA); Gaultier Tallieu (FRA)
2017	Martín Wizner (ESP); Pedro Ameneiro (ESP)	Tommaso Cilli (ITA); Bruno Mantero (ITA)	Demetrio Sposato (ITA); Gabriele Centrone (ITA)
2018	Jacobo García (ESP); Antoni Ripoll (ESP)	Marina Garau (ESP); Blanca Cabot (ESP)	Odysseas Spanakis (GRE); Konstantinos Mixalopoulos (GRE)
2019	Odysseas Spanakis (GRE); Konstaninos Mixalopoulos (GRE)	Ange Delerce (FRA); Timothée Rossi (FRA)	Alberto Morales (ESP); Miguel Bethencourt (ESP)
2020	CANCELLED COVID-19		
2021	USA 56345 (61); Freddie Parkin (USA); Thomas Whidden (USA)	ESP 56852 (5); Maria Perello (ESP); Marta Cardona (ESP)	ESP 56543 (6); Marc Mesquida (ESP); Ramón Jaume (ESP)
2022	GER 57220 (29); Severin Gericke (GER); Xaver Schwarz (GER)	ESP 56918 (11); Miguel Ángel Morales Hernandez (ESP); Alejandro Martín Corujo (ESP)	GER 57219 (28); Valentina Steinlein (GER); Lea Adolph (GER)
2023	ITA 57483 (181); Alessio Cindolo (ITA); Marco Dogliotti (ITA)	GRE 56944 (167); Georgios Iraklis Michalopoulos (GRE); Ion Stamatios Stromatias (GRE)	GER 56733 (207); Esther Rodenhausen (GER); Luisa Sophie Becker (GER)
2024	Not Held		
2025	GRE 57589; Eleni Galazoula (GRE); Stavros Aronis (GRE)	GRE 57590; Epameinondas Ventouris-Ladas (GRE); Kyriakos Zaponidis (GRE)	ESP 56971; Amalia Coll (ESP); Laia Mattos (ESP)
2026	GRE 56914; Faidra Tsoulfa (GRE); Lydia Nachamouli (GRE)	GRE 56678; Agis Christos Angelopoulos (GRE); Georgios Mandilas (GRE)	GRE 57823; Filippos Portosalte (GRE); Andreas Psomiadis (GRE)

=== Team Racing ===
Year	Gold	Silver	Bronze
