= RS Feva World Championship =

Youth Class Sailing World Championship

The RS Feva World Championships is an annual international sailing regatta for RS Feva they are organized by the host club on behalf of the International Class Association and recognized by World Sailing, the sports IOC recognized governing body.

== Events ==
Ed.	Date		Host			Sailors			Boats				Ref.
Ed.	Day/Month	Year	Host club	Location	Nat.	Tot	Nat	Con	Boat			Mix	Ref.
1	22–27 July	2006	Circolo Nautico Brenzone	Lake Garda	Italy		10						
		2007	NOT HELD										
2	1-7 Aug	2008	Segelsallskapet Kaparen	Gottskär	Sweden	206	9	2	103				
		2009	NOT HELD										
3	24–31 July	2010	Yacht Club de Carnac	Carnac	France	280	8	1	140				
4	22–29 July	2011	Bruinisse Jachthaven	Bruinisse	Netherlands				160				
5	21–27 July	2012	Hayling Island Sailing Club	Hayling Island	United Kingdom	360	14	3	180		46		
6	20–26 July	2013	Compagnia della Vela Grosseto	Grosseto	Italy	342	15	3	171		41		
7	26 July to 1 Aug	2014	Yacht Club de Carnac	Carnac	France	368	18	4	184		33		
8	19–25 July	2015	Lübecker Yacht Club	Travemunde	Germany	324			162				
9	22–29 July	2016	Real Club Maritimo de Santander	Santander, Spain	Spain	324			162				
10	21–28 July	2017		Medemblik	Netherlands	354	17	4	177				
11	1-8 Apr	2018	Clearwater Community Sailing Centre		United States	102	11	4	51				
12	20–26 July	2019	Gruppo Vela L.N.I	Follonica	Italy	268	19	4	134	67	29	38	
N/A	21–25 July	2020	Lübecker Yacht Club	Travemunde	Germany	(Postponed COVID)							
13	-	2021	Lübecker Yacht Club	Travemunde	Germany	194	11	2	97				
14	21–27 July	2022	Weymouth and Portland National Sailing Academy	Isle of Portland	United Kingdom	370	14	3	185	90	56	39	
15	-	2023	Gruppo Vela L.N.I	Follonica	Italy	420	15	3	210	97	60	53	
16	Jul - Aug	2024	Jeugdcommissie regio Deltawateren	Bruinisse	Netherlands	346	18	3	173				
17	26 July to 1 Aug	2025	Club Nautique Voile d'Aix les Bains	Aix-les-Bains	France	337	14	2	168	83	39	46	

== Overall Medalists ==
Games	Gold	Silver	Bronze	Ref.
2006	James Peters (GBR); Ben Gratton (GBR)	Rob Cage (GBR); Georgina Cage (GBR)	Ruggero Tita (ITA); Dalla Rosa Simone (ITA)	
2008	Tim Gratton (GBR); Chris Taylor (GBR)	Sofia Engstrom (SWE); Frida Langenius (SWE)	Edoardo Semezato (ITA); Ludovico Bonsi (ITA)	
2010	Owen Bowerman (GBR); Charlie Darling (GBR)	Jack Hawkins (GBR); Christopher Thomas (GBR)	Matteo Pilati (ITA); Duchi Mattia (ITA)	
2011	Matthew Whitfield (GBR); Scott Wallis (GBR)	Owen Bowerman (GBR); Charlie Darling (GBR)	Robert Baddeley (GBR); James Taylor (GBR)	
2012	Leonardo Stocchero (ITA); Gianluca Virgenti (ITA)	Robbie King (IRL); Josh Atherton (IRL)	Jamie Smith (GBR); Piers Nicholls (GBR)	
2013	Hannah Bristow (GBR); Bobby Hewitt (GBR)	Elliott Wells (GBR); Jake Todd (GBR)	Arthur Brown (GBR); Niamh Davies (GBR)	
2014	Harvey Martin (GBR); Bobby Hewitt (GBR)	Piers Nicholls (GBR); Freddie Peters (GBR)	Nikol Stankova (CZE); Vaclav Brabec (CZE)	
2015	Iain Bird (NZL); Jake Hardman (GBR)	Fin Armstrong (GBR); Dan Armstrong (GBR)	Jack Lewis (GBR); Lucas Marshall (GBR)	
2016	Freddie Peters (GBR); Louis Johnson (GBR)	Charles Elliott (GBR); Ethan Miles (GBR)	Jack Lewis (GBR); Lucas Marshall (GBR)	
2017	Eli Liefting (NZL); Rose Dickson (NZL)	Henry Jameson (GBR); Rupert Jameson (GBR)	Pierce Harris (GBR); Alfie Cogger (GBR)	
2018	Ben Hutton-Penman (GBR); Abi Jayasekara (GBR)	Tom Storey (GBR); Rupert Jameson (GBR)	Dieter Creitz (USA); Conrad Miller (USA)	
2019	NZL 6191; Simon Cooke (NZL); Oskar Masfen (NZL)	GBR 6300; Raulf Berry (GBR); Olly Peters (GBR)	NZL 7414; Blake Hinsley (NZL); Nicholas Drummond (NZL)	
2020	Delay to 2021 due to COVID-19			
2021	FRA 7848; Lisandru Bunel (FRA); Thomas Kuntze (FRA)	ITA 7511; Francesco Trucchi (ITA); Massimiliano Scalzulli (ITA)	LTU 2 Nojus Volungevicius (LTU); Vilius Raciunas (LTU)	
2022	Simon Cooke (NZL); Arthur Rebbeck (NZL)	Joseph Jones (GBR); Charlie Howard (GBR)	Freddie Sunderland (GBR); Stella Nygard (FIN)	
2023	GBR 8600; Ben Greenhalgh (GBR); Tom Sinfield (GBR)	ITA 7304; Giuseppe Bicocchi (ITA); Gemma Giovannelli (ITA)	LTU 2 Ruta Mazunavicyiut (LTU); Nojus Volungevicius (LTU)	
2024	GBR 8600; Ben Greenhalgh (GBR); Tom Sinfield (GBR)	NED 2303; Doeke van Surksum (GBR); Sven van Dartel (GBR)	GBR 5064; William Stratton-Brown (GBR); Will Ahlheid (GBR)	
2025	AUT 5842; David Vogl (AUT); Valentin Vogl (AUT)	NZL 9153; Zofia Wells (NZL); Charlotte Handley (NZL)	ITA 7644; Mario Montanari (ITA); Domenico Bazzani (ITA)	

== Female Medalists ==
Games	Gold	Silver	Bronze	Ref.
2006	Alex Poyner (GBR); Holly Tucker (GBR)	(25x17px) (25x17px)	Charlotte Coles (ITA); Alexandra Coles (ITA)	
2008	Sofia Engstrom (SWE); Frida Langenius (SWE)	Alessandra Moretto (ITA); Bianca Maria Nuvolari (ITA)	Alice Kent (GBR); Lucy Childs (GBR)	
2010	Vikky Cudmore (GBR); Amy Hurrington (GBR)	Veronica Maria Maccari (ITA); Marte Lenotti (ITA)	Cathy Lear (ITA); Francine Counsel (ITA)	
2011	Floor Vrijenhoek (NDL); Sterre Vrijenhoek (NDL)	Francesca Bergamo (ITA); Alessandra Dubbin (ITA)	Camilla Angiolini (ITA); Giorgia Angiolini (ITA)	
2012	Jemina Lawson (GBR); Jenny Cropley (GBR)	Courtney Bilbrough (GBR); Orla Mitchel (GBR)	Sophie Hempsell (GBR); Emily Covel (GBR)	
2013	Margherita Porro (ITA); Francesca Dall’Ora (ITA)	Anna Prescott (GBR); Jess Eales (GBR)	Jess Hammet (GBR); Hattie Lucas Clements (GBR)	
2014	Hanna Bristow (GBR); Madeline Bristow (GBR)	Caroline Heiberg (NOR); Marie Bordal (NOR)	Jessie Main (GBR); Poppy Gilks (GBR)	
2015	Freya Black (GBR); Harriet Cage (GBR)	Lizet De Vries (NDL); Jildou Gerritsen (NDL)	Jessica Jobson (GBR); Caitlin Webster (GBR)	
2016	Julia Barnes (GBR); Lauren Paton (GBR)	Farao Tea (ITA); Perbellini Federica (ITA)	Nynke Verwoerd (NDL); Annabel Wikel (NDL)	
2017	Sian Talbot (GBR); Eloise Clapson Mcbride (GBR)	Sophie Johnson (GBR); Becky Caiger (GBR)	Sophie Denniss (GBR); Dilly Ala (GBR)	
2018	Hannie Hammet (GBR); Emma Wells (GBR)	Anna Justovà (CZE); Nela Viskorovà (CZE)	Hanna Rijk (NDL); BEnte Zuidema (NDL)	
2019	Alice Davis (GBR); Abby Hire (GBR)	Millie Irish (NZL); Tasmyn Green (NZL)	Phoebe Peters (GBR); Rachel Pyke (GBR)	
2020	Delay to 2021 due to COVID-19			
2021	Letizia Angela Tonoli (ITA); Annalisa Vicentini (ITA)	Petra De Vos (NDL); Sam Swart (NDL)	Ruta Mazunaviciute (LTU); Meta Rimaite (LTU)	
2022	Kate Rasmussen (NZL); Madison Russel (NZL)	Marleen Huisman (NDL); Silke Zuidema (NDL)	Kitty O’Halloran (IRL); Lily O’Halloran (IRL)	
2023	Mia Maria Lipsmae (EST); Sandra Sinivee (EST)	Monika Krenkova (CZE); Kristyna Krenkova (CZE)	Carlotta Palmarini (ITA); Aurora Emiliani (ITA)	
2024	Giulia Lusini (ITA); Camilla Parinelli (ITA)	Monika Krenkova (CZE); Kristyna Krenkova (CZE)	Rachel Elms (GBR); Laura Jubb (GBR)	
2025	Zofia Wells (NZL); Charlotte Handley (NZL)	Emily Ridout (GBR); Annabel Ridout (GBR)	Rachel Elms (GBR); Laura Jubb (GBR)	
