= 2023 Sailing World Championships – 470 =

470 at the 2023 Sailing World Championships
- Venue: The Hague, the Netherlands
- Dates: 11–17 August
- Competitors: 128 from 28 nations

Medalists
gold medal	Keiju Okada; Miho Yoshioka	Japan
silver medal	Jordi Xammar; Nora Brugman	Spain
bronze medal	Tetsuya Isozaki; Yurie Seki	Japan

The 470 competition at the 2023 Sailing World Championships was the mixed dinghy event and was held in The Hague, the Netherlands, 11–17 August 2023. The entries were limited to 70 boats. The competitors participated in an opening series that was planned to 11 races, followed by a medal race. The medal race was planned for 17 August.

The competition served as a qualifying event for the 2024 Olympic sailing competition with 8 out of 19 national quota being distributed at the event.

== Summary ==
Luise Wanser and Philipp Autenrieth of Germany were the reigning world champions, having won the 2022 470 World Championship in Sdot Yam, while Camille Lecointre and Jérémie Mion of France had won the Paris 2024 Test Event the month before. In the Sailing World Cup, Keiju Okada and Miho Yoshioka of Japan had won the Trofeo Princesa Sofía, Jordi Xammar and Nora Brugman of Spain had won the Semaine Olympique Française, and Simon Diesch and Anna Markfort had won the Kiel Week.

Okada and Yoshioka took the lead the first day by winning one race and finishing fourth in the other race, three points ahead of Dong Wenju and Wang Jingsa of China. Okada and Yoshioka secured their championship title before the medal race on the ultimate day, 32 points ahead of Xammar and Brugman on the penultimate day. Into the medal race, five teams were within seven points for the other medals. In the medal race, Xammar and Brugman secured their silver medal, while Tetsuya Isozaki and Yurie Seki of Japan took the bronze medal.

With the final results, national quotas were awarded Japan, Spain, Austria, Germany, Sweden, Israel, Portugal, and Switzerland.

== Results ==
Results of individual races
Pos	Crew	Country	I	II	III	IV	V	VI	VII	VIII	IX	X	XI	MR	Tot	Pts
Gold medal	Keiju Okada; Miho Yoshioka	Japan	1	4	1	6	3	2	5	1	24^{†}	3	14	10	74	50
Silver medal	Jordi Xammar; Nora Brugman	Spain	7	13	4	4	15	5	20^{†}	4	3	8	15	8	106	86
Bronze medal	Tetsuya Isozaki; Yurie Seki	Japan	6	8	12	1	2	11	6	13	14	21^{†}	12	6	112	91
4	Lara Vadlau; Lukas Mähr	Austria	19^{†}	2	5	10	6	8	9	8	15	5	13	12	112	93
5	Malte Winkel; Anastasiya Winkel	Germany	5	14	16^{†}	7	5	14	12	3	8	11	1	14	110	94
6	Anton Dahlberg; Lovisa Karlsson	Sweden	11	5	3	3	11	12	23^{†}	20	2	22	2	4	118	95
7	Nitai Hasson; Noa Lasry	Israel	UFD 33^{†}	6	2	8	13	19	15	2	4	6	21	2	131	98
8	Simon Diesch; Anna Markfort	Germany	18	9	1	5	3	1	4	18	11	12	24^{†}	16	122	98
9	Luise Wanser; Philipp Autenrieth	Germany	21^{†}	3	9	10	10	9	8	10	19	10	8	18	135	114
10	Diogo Costa; Carolina João	Portugal	12	12	4	15	1	24^{†}	2	5	7	20	18	20	140	116
11	Silvia Mas; Nicolás Rodríguez	Spain	1	22^{†}	7	8	4	15	3	9	18	17	17	–	121	99
12	Yves Mermod; Maja Siegenthaler	Switzerland	7	11	19	17	8	23^{†}	7	7	9	9	7	–	124	101
13	Vita Heathcote; Chris Grube	Great Britain	28	23	6	2	16	3	13	30^{†}	10	1	10	–	142	112
14	Matisse Pacaud; Lucie de Gennes	France	10	11	10	9	14	13	29^{†}	11	6	7	22	–	142	113
15	Martin Wrigley; Bettine Harris	Great Britain	UFD 33^{†}	17	11	5	1	10	1	21	12	14	23	–	148	115
16	Xu Ming; Tu Yahan	China	10	1	17	9	24^{†}	7	11	19	16	24	5	–	143	119
17	Theresa Löffler; Christopher Hörr	Germany	5	17	9	11	7	27^{†}	26	17	13	18	11	–	161	134
18	Stuart McNay; Lara Dallman-Weiss	United States	9	7	17	11	12	17	16	14	23	26^{†}	9	–	161	135
19	Giacomo Ferrari; Bianca Caruso	Italy	14	15	2	1	DSQ 33	RET 34^{†}	19	16	5	2	STP 32	–	173	139
20	Camille Lecointre; Jérémie Mion	France	UFD 33^{†}	4	11	2	23	6	17	28	1	19	30	–	174	141
21	Louisa Nordstrom; Trevor Bornarth	United States	15	10	5	13	15	4	28	23	27	4	32^{†}	–	176	144
22	Deniz Çınar; Simay Aslan	Turkey	17	5	15	12	7	22	27	15	29^{†}	16	19	–	184	155
23	Henrique Haddad; Isabel Swan	Brazil	3	15	20	18	9	25	24	24	26^{†}	13	6	–	183	157
24	Daichi Takayama; Fuyuka Morita	Japan	9	13	8	6	19	29	14	12	21	31^{†}	29	–	191	160
25	Charlotte Leigh; Ryan Orr	Great Britain	26	1	6	13	12	28	30^{†}	22	22	27	4	–	191	161
26	Theres Dahnke; Matti Cipra	Germany	19	23	7	12	5	26	10	33^{†}	28	15	16	–	194	161
27	Dong Wenju; Wang Jingsa	China	2	6	15	DSQ 33^{†}	28	21	31	27	17	28	3	–	211	178
28	Ai Yoshida; Yugo Yoshida	Japan	4	7	24	14	4	20	18	26	31	30	DNF 34^{†}	–	212	178
29	Neus Ballester	Spain	6	20	23	20	8	16	32	6	33^{†}	25	26	–	215	182
30	Hugo le Clech; Aloïse Retornaz	France	3	27	13	7	20	31^{†}	25	31	20	23	27	–	227	196
31	Efe Tulçalı	Turkey	15	2	26	25	6	30	21	32	25	33^{†}	20	–	235	202
32	Rodrigo Linck; Ana Barbachan	Brazil	23	16	14	4	UFD 33^{†}	18	22	29	30	29	25	–	243	210
33	Belén Tavella; Tomas Dietrich	Argentina	2	19	18	20	18	32	33^{†}	25	32	32	28	–	259	226
34	Beatriz Gago; Rodolfo Pires	Portugal	12	25^{†}	18	22	14	4	2	5	4	1	4	–	111	86
35	Afrodite Zegers; Pim van Vugt	Netherlands	25	16	3	17	29^{†}	2	3	9	1	6	5	–	116	87
36	Nia Jerwood; Conor Nicholas	Australia	13	27	19	3	UFD 33^{†}	1	8	11	10	2	8	–	135	102
37	Elena Berta; Bruno Festo	Italy	8	26^{†}	21	14	22	9	1	2	8	5	15	–	131	105
38	Hannah Bristow; James Taylor	Great Britain	13	21^{†}	8	18	19	7	5	18	5	3	20	–	137	116
39	Vasilis Papoutsoglou; Symeon Michalopoulos	Greece	24^{†}	20	14	STP 17	21	13	14	4	13	16	2	–	158	134
40	Linda Fahrni; Cyril Schüpbach	Switzerland	11	22	20	24	18	3	10	12	3	15	25^{†}	–	163	138
41	Benedetta Di Salle; Alessio Bellico	Italy	22	29	10	22	17	11	BFD 32^{†}	3	9	4	14	–	173	141
42	Manon Pennaneac'h; Pierre Williot	France	18	31	16	19	11	10	BFD 32^{†}	16	6	9	6	–	174	142
43	Muhammad Fauzi Kaman Shah; Juni Karimah Noor Jamali	Malaysia	16	28	24	21	29^{†}	5	4	7	26	17	1	–	178	149
44	Juliana Duque; Rafael Martins	Brazil	27	21	23	16	10	8	BFD 32^{†}	24	7	12	3	–	183	151
45	Rosa Donner; Niklas Haberl	Austria	22	9	21	28^{†}	28	6	15	8	11	19	12	–	179	151
46	Agnieszka Pawłowska; Bartłomiej Szlija	Poland	4	8	29	DNS 33^{†}	UFD 33	16	6	1	21	21	21	–	193	160
47	Zofia Korsak; Franciszek Borys	Poland	16	12	30^{†}	29	9	22	9	10	27	26	13	–	203	173
48	Ariadne Spanaki; Odysseas Spanakis	Greece	25	30	22	23	UFD 33^{†}	26	20	13	2	10	7	–	211	178
49	Navee Thamsoontorn; Piyaporn Khemkaew	Thailand	8	29^{†}	29	STP 28	22	15	11	14	18	27	9	–	210	181
50	Sophie Jackson; Angus Higgins	Australia	31^{†}	25	13	15	30	19	16	29	20	8	10	–	216	185
51	Pablo Ruiz; Mar Gil	Spain	17	18	25	26	2	14	BFD 32^{†}	28	16	24	17	–	219	187
52	Shraddha Verma; Ravindra Kumar Sharma	India	24	14	28^{†}	STP 24	13	20	21	22	23	11	18	–	218	190
53	Derek Scott; Rebecca Hume	New Zealand	27	28	27	21	23	17	7	6	UFD 32^{†}	14	22	–	224	192
54	Kacper Paszek; Oliwią Laskowską	Poland	20	10	25	28^{†}	17	25	23	23	19	22	11	–	223	195
55	Carmen Cowles; David Hughes	United States	21	3	DNC 33^{†}	DNC 33	20	UFD 32	13	20	14	18	RET 32	–	239	206
56	Preethi Kongara; Sudhanshu Shekhar	India	14	19	DNF 33^{†}	RET 33	25	27	12	17	12	25	UFD 32	–	249	216
57	Brittany Wornall; Sam Street	New Zealand	29	24	12	19	26	UFD 32^{†}	RET 32	30	22	7	24	–	257	225
58	Lampis Eulampios Giannoulis; Eleni Giannouli	Greece	20	31	26	26	16	18	18	19	UFD 32^{†}	20	DNF 32	–	258	226
59	Julia Jacobsen; Emil Forslund	Norway	UFD 33^{†}	18	22	STP 28	21	21	BFD 32	15	17	RET 32	23	–	262	229
60	Annabelle Rennie-Younger; Blake McGlashan	New Zealand	26	32	RET 33^{†}	25	24	12	24	31	15	13	27	–	262	229
61	Martin Fras; Mija Skerlavaj	Slovenia	28	30^{†}	27	24	26	24	17	25	24	23	19	–	267	237
62	Ema Samardžija; Leon Scheidl	Croatia	29	26	28	DNF 33^{†}	27	28	22	21	25	30	16	–	285	252
63	Kyra Phelan; Sawyer Bastian	United States	23	24	31	DNF 33^{†}	25	23	19	26	UFD 32	28	26	–	290	257
64	Daumantė Petraitytė; Jurgis Jurgelionis	Lithuania	30	32	32	DNF 33^{†}	27	UFD 32	RET 32	27	UFD 32	29	UFD 32	–	338	305

Scoring system: low-point system; Source:
Legend: – Qualified for medal race(s); BFD – Black flag disqualification; DNC – Did not come to the starting area; DNF – Did not finish; DNS – Did not start; DSQ – Disqualified; RET – Retired; STP – Standard penalty imposed; UFD – "U" flag disqualification; † – Discarded race not counted in the overall result;
