= RS Tera World Championships =

Youth Class Sailing World Championship

The RS Tera World Championships is an annual international sailing regatta for RS Tera they are organized by the host club on behalf of the International Class Association and recognized by World Sailing, the sports IOC recognized governing body.

== Events ==
Event			Host			Rig	Participation					Ref.
Ed.	Dates	Year	Host club	Location	Country	Rig	No.			Nat.	Cont	Ref.
1	8 - 10 Aug	2008	Björlanda Kile and Kaparen	Gottskär	Sweden	Sport	50	33	17	7	1	
2	24–31 July	2010	Yacht Club de Carnac	Carnac	France	Sport	30	23	7	5	2	
2	24–31 July	2010	Yacht Club de Carnac	Carnac	France	Pro	19	13	6	3	1	
3	1 - 6 Aug	2011	Aabenraa Sejlclub	Aabenraa	Denmark	Sport	45	31	14	5	2	
3	1 - 6 Aug	2011	Aabenraa Sejlclub	Aabenraa	Denmark	Pro	26	16	10	5	2	
4	4 - 8 Aug	2012	Associazione Nautica Sebina	Sulazano on Lake Iseo	Italy	Sport	40	31	9	8	2	
4	4 - 8 Aug	2012	Associazione Nautica Sebina	Sulazano on Lake Iseo	Italy	Pro	34	26	8	6	2	
5	29 July to 2 Aug	2013	Weymouth and Portland National Sailing Academy	Isle of Portland	United Kingdom	Sport	72	60	12	6	4	
5	29 July to 2 Aug	2013	Weymouth and Portland National Sailing Academy	Isle of Portland	United Kingdom	Pro	51	35	16	5	3	
6	25 July to 3 Aug	2014	Pine Lake Marina	Sedgefield	South Africa	Sport	27	18	9	5	2	
6	25 July to 3 Aug	2014	Pine Lake Marina	Sedgefield	South Africa	Pro	30	21	9	5	2	
7	26–29 July	2015	Aquivitesse	Bruinisse	Netherlands	Sport	59	39	20	6	2	
7	26–29 July	2015	Aquivitesse	Bruinisse	Netherlands	Pro	49	37	12	6	3	
8	30 July to 5 Aug	2016	Club de Vela Santoña	Santona	Spain	Sport	41	29	12	5	2	
8	30 July to 5 Aug	2016	Club de Vela Santoña	Santona	Spain	Pro	31	27	4	6	3	
9	30 July to 4 Aug	2017	Yacht Club de Carnac	Carnac	France	Sport	66	51	15	6	2	
9	30 July to 4 Aug	2017	Yacht Club de Carnac	Carnac	France	Pro	37	25	12	2	2	
10	4-10 Aug	2018	Weymouth and Portland National Sailing Academy	Isle of Portland	United Kingdom	Sport	81	61	20	9	3	
10	4-10 Aug	2018	Weymouth and Portland National Sailing Academy	Isle of Portland	United Kingdom	Pro	66	45	21	7	4	
11	4-9 Aug	2019	Ljungskile Segelsällskap	Ljungskile	Sweden	Sport	52	36	16	7	2	
11	4-9 Aug	2019	Ljungskile Segelsällskap	Ljungskile	Sweden	Pro	33	20	13	6	3	
N/A	4 - 9 Apr	2020	Pine Lake Marina	Sedgefield	South Africa	CANCELLED DUE TO COVID						
N/A	1-7 Aug	2021	Sejlklubben Køge Bugt	Greve	Denmark	CANCELLED DUE TO COVID						
12		2022	Weymouth and Portland National Sailing Academy	Isle of Portland	United Kingdom	Sport	63	38	25	5	1	
12		2022	Weymouth and Portland National Sailing Academy	Isle of Portland	United Kingdom	Pro	59	33	26	9	3	
13	30 July to 4 Aug	2023	Associazione Nautica Sebina		Italy	Sport	42	29	13	7	2	
13	30 July to 4 Aug	2023	Associazione Nautica Sebina		Italy	Pro	22	14	8	6	1	
14	5-8 Aug	2024	Sejlklubben Køge Bugt	Greve	Denmark	Sport	61	42	19	8	2	
14	5-8 Aug	2024	Sejlklubben Køge Bugt	Greve	Denmark	Pro	57	32	25	9	2	
15	5-8 Aug	2025	Jachetní klub Černá v Pošumaví, z.s.		Czech Republic	Sport	40	23	17	6	2	
15	5-8 Aug	2025	Jachetní klub Černá v Pošumaví, z.s.		Czech Republic	Pro	35	20	15	8	3	
16	July	2026	Part of Travemunder Woche and RS Games		Germany	Sport	62			9	2	
16	July	2026	Part of Travemunder Woche and RS Games		Germany	Pro	63			10	2	

== Medalists ==
Year	Rig	Gold	Silver	Bronze	1st Female	Ref.
2008	Sport	Hermann Tomasgaard (NOR)	Arya Sevgen (TUR)	Beatrice Törnsten (SWE)	3rd / Beatrice Törnsten (SWE)	
2009	NOT HELD					
2010	Sport	Eoin Lyden (IRL)	Brice Yrieix (FRA)	Ugo Zunardi (ITA)	11th / Juliette Pavy (FRA)	
2010	Pro	James Kelly (GBR)	Joshua Aldridge (GBR)	Matthew French (GBR)	5th Hannah Howitt (GBR)	
2011	Sport	Elliott Wells (GBR)	Nathan Page (RSA)	James Hellstrom (RSA)	6th Margherita Porro (ITA)	
2011	Pro	William Taylor (GBR)	Will Robinson (GBR)	Michele Vezzoli (ITA)	4th Rebecca Lewis (GBR)	
2012	Sport	Billy Vennis-Ozanne (GBR)	Georgou Divaris (RSA)	James Hellstrom (RSA)	16th Niamh Davies (GBR)	
2012	Pro Rig	Gregory Kelly (GBR)	James Hutton-Penman (GBR)	Rebecca Lewis (GBR)	3rd Rebecca Lewis (GBR)	
2013	Sport	Georgou Divaris (RSA)	Jack Lewis (GBR)	Freddie Peters (GBR)	14th Charlotte Ormerod (GBR)	
2013	Pro	Crispin Beaumont (GBR)	Sam Lombaard (RSA)	James Hellstrom (RSA)	16th Grace Summers (GBR)	
2014	Sport	Arin Long (RSA)	Michaela Robinson (RSA)	Benji Daniel (RSA)	2nd Michaela Robinson (RSA)	
2014	Pro	James Hellstrom (RSA)	Jason Gray (RSA)	Christopher Crawford (ZIM)	4th Tammy Holden (RSA)	
2015	Sport	Tom Storey (GBR)	Roscoe Martin (GBR)	Freddy Wood (GBR)	11th Flo Peters (GBR)	
2015	Pro	Harrison Pye (GBR)	Henry Jameson (GBR)	Matt Smith (GBR)	7th Michaela Robinson (RSA)	
2016	Sport	Ewan Wilson (GBR)	Robbie McDonald (GBR)	Arnau Gelpi (ESP)	9th Phoebe Peters (GBR)	
2016	Pro	Jack Lewis (GBR)	Roscoe Martin (GBR)	Ben Batchelor (GBR)	16th Josie Ruffles (GBR)	
2017	Sport	Jake Thompson (GBR)	Phoebe Peters (GBR)	Tom Ahlheid (FRA)	2nd Phoebe Peters (GBR)	
2017	Pro	Jack Lewis (GBR)	Blake Tudor (GBR)	Robbie McDonald (GBR)	7th Sophie Johnson (GBR)	
2018	Sport	Oliver Peters (GBR)	Alice Davis (GBR)	William James (GBR)	2nd Alice Davis (GBR)	
2018	Pro	Ben Tuttle (GBR)	Beth Miller (NZL)	Luke Anstey (GBR)	2nd Beth Miller (NZL)	
2019	Sport	Jac Bailey (GBR)	William Bailey (GBR)	Matthew Rayner (GBR)	12th Tilda BRAYSHAY (GBR)	
2019	Pro	Alice Davis (GBR)	Peter Cope (GBR)	Max Steele (GBR)	1st Alice Davis (GBR)	
2020	CANCELLED DUE TO COVID					
2021	CANCELLED DUE TO COVID					
2022	Sport	Ruta Mažunaviciute (LTU)	Ben Greenhalgh (GBR)	William Stratton-Brown (GBR)	1st Ruta Mažunaviciute (LTU)	
2022	Pro	Archie Munro-Price (GBR)	Jac Bailey (GBR)	Nojus Volungevicius (LTU)	5th Jasmijn HOLTUS (NED)	
2023	Sport	Yevhenii Kuzmenko (UKR)	Daniel Whitehead (GBR)	Pavlo Zinchenko (GBR)	11th Zoe LOMAS-CLARKE (GBR)	
2023	Pro	Ben Greenhalgh (GBR)	Will Bradley (GBR)	Greta Kalinauskait (LTU)	3rd Greta Kalinauskait (LTU)	
2024	Sport	Rafe Bradley (GBR)	Yevhenii Kuzmenko (UKR)	Lin Zhou (USA)	4th Hannah Yates (GBR)	
2024	Pro	William Stratton-Brown (GBR)	Cassius Day (GBR)	Rimsa Rokas (LTU)	7th Trinette VÄLISSON (EST)	
2025	Sport	Hari Clark (GBR)	Yevhenii Kuzmenko (UKR)	Arina Duzha (UKR)	3rd Arina Duzha (UKR)	
2025	Pro	Rafe Bradley (GBR)	Jasper Jenkinson (GBR)	Oleksandr Chykalov (UKR)	7th Molly Wilson (GBR)	
2026	Sport	Freddie Harrison (GBR)	Harry Wilson (GBR)	Aggie Priestley (GBR)	3rd Aggie Priestley (GBR)	
2026	Pro	Charlie Hunt (GBR)	Hari Clark (GBR)	Oleksandr Chykalov (UKR)	8th Arina Duzha (UKR)	
