= Reguant =

Reguant is a Catalan surname. Notable people with the surname include:

- Eulàlia Reguant (born 1979), Catalan politician
- Mar Reguant (born 1984), Spanish and American economist
- Ricard Reguant (born 1953), dramaturge, original director of Grease (musical)
