= Antich =

Antich is a surname of Catalan origin. Notable people with the surname include:

- Francesc Antich (1958–2025), Venezuelan-born Spanish politician
- Mónica Antich (born 1966), Spanish synchronized swimmer
- Xavier Antich (born 1962), Catalan philosopher, writer, and university professor

== See also ==
- Fernándo Ochoa Antich (born 1938), Venezuelan lawyer, diplomat and politician, and retired general
- Salvador Puig Antich (1948–1974), Spanish militant anarchist
