= Eulàlia Reguant =

Catalan politician

Eulàlia Reguant i Cura
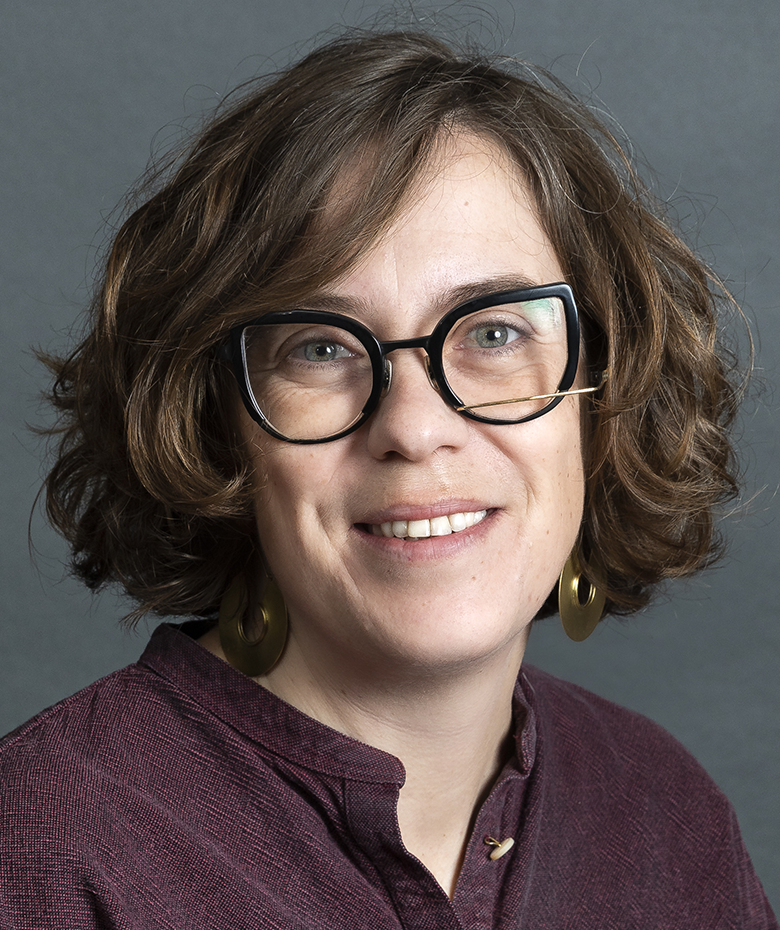
- Eulàlia Reguant (2021)

Member of the Parliament of Catalonia
- In office October 2015 – October 2017
- Parliamentary group: Popular Unity Candidacy
- Constituency: Barcelona

Councilor, City Council of Barcelona
- In office July 2017 – June 2019

Personal details
- Born: September 19, 1979 (age 46) Barcelona
- Occupation: Politician

Eulàlia Reguant i Cura (born September 19, 1979) is a Catalan politician. From 2015 to 2017 she represented the constituency of Barcelona in the Parliament of Catalonia, where she was a member of the Popular Unity Candidacy (CUP). From 2017 to 2019 she was a councilor in the City Council of Barcelona.

== Life and career ==
Reguant earned a degree in mathematics from the University of Barcelona.

Reguant was a candidate in the elections to the Parliament of Catalonia in 2015, after being chosen in the primary elections to represent the Popular Unity Candidacy for the Barcelona constituency. She became a deputy of the XI Legislature of the Parliament of Catalonia.

In October 2017, Reguant left the Parliament of Catalonia to instead become a Councilor in the City Council of Barcelona.

In February 2018 she headed a list that successfully contested the Secretariat of the Popular Unity Candidacy.

Reguant ran in the fourth position on the list of the Popular Unity Candidacy in the November 2019 Spanish general election.

=== Straight Against Fascism ===
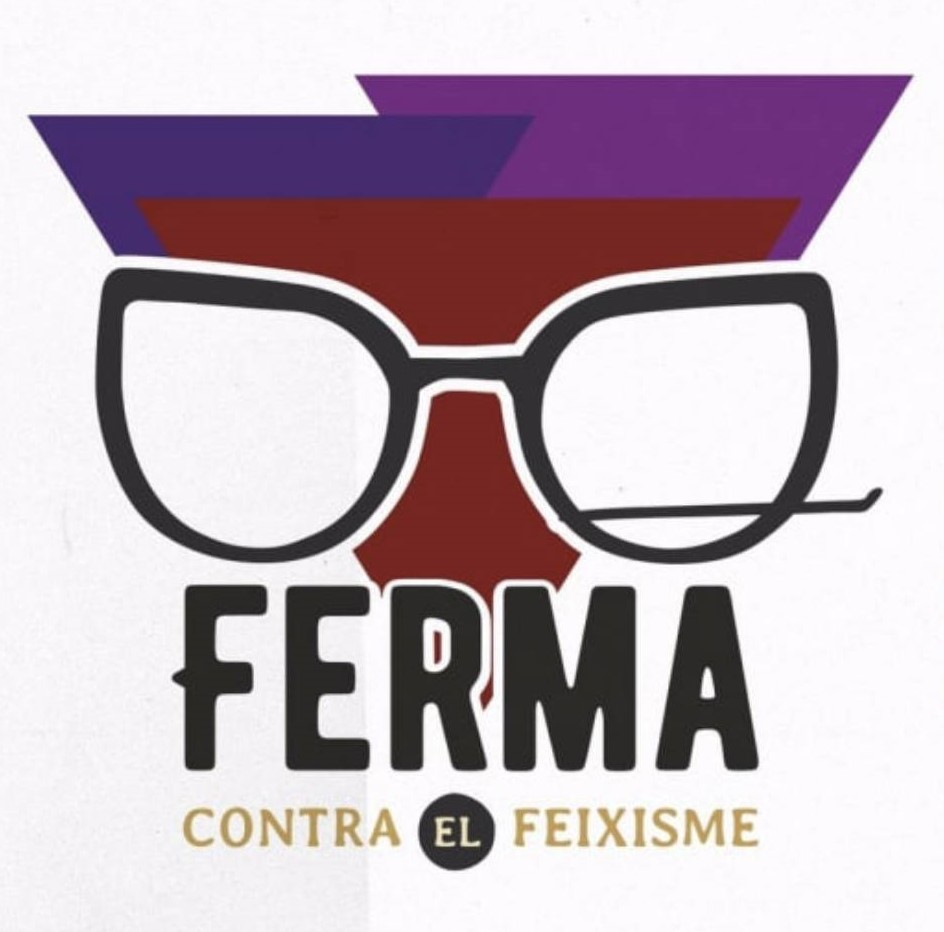
Logo of the support campaign

On 27 February 2019, during the trial of Catalonia independence leaders, the former deputy Antonio Baños and her refused to answer the questions that the far-right party Vox asked as particular indictment. Specifically she mentioned in Spanish the will to "expresse, assuming the consequences, that in front of a machist and xenophobic far-right party, I am not going to answer the questions of Vox". The goal of the action was the desire to highlight "the anomaly of the presence of Vox as a popular accusation in the trial against the right to self-determination and to denounce the collusion between the far-right and the judicial Spanish apparatus". For these facts, in April 2021, the examining magistrate's court (juzgado de instrucción) number 10 of Madrid accepted the case investigation and, along the autumn, requested to the Supreme Court of Spain to declare itself competent to judge it, as far she had parliamentary immunity. While, in parallel, the trial against Antonio Baños continued in an ordinary way and was summoned on 29 September 2022 in the same examining magistrate's court. During the first phase of the investigation, both prosecuted also refused to answer the questions of Vox, which was part of the indictment of that trial. The Provincial Prosecutor of Madrid intervened in the case of both pro-independence politicians and declared the facts to be punishable by serious disobedience, while requesting for each of them a half-year prison sentence and the prohibition of passive suffrage. Once the instruction was completed, the court sent the resolution to the Supreme Court as far as she was deputy. On 24 November 2021, the high court notified to Reguant's defense that will take the case into account, and on 20 December opened the oral phase.

On 10 January 2022, defense attorney Daniel Amelang called for the nullity of the procedure since "neither the court that has formulated the instruction nor the prosecutor that has made the accusation are competent in the case" taking into account the prerogatives of the parliamentary immunity that protect her as legislator and that, in any case, the examination of the magistrate should be restarted again from the Supreme Court. The paper presented also exclaimed that "is not possible to sanction twice for the same behavior" (principle of non bis in idem), considering that both politicians were already sanctioned in 2019 by the Second Chamber of the Spanish Supreme Court. Specifically, and on the basis of Articles 192 and 554 1.b) of the Judiciary Power's Organic Law (LOPJ), they were fined each of them with 2,500 euros in "disciplinary correction", a sanction that can only be brought against acts that do not constitute a crime. Also, the defense justified that the accusation violates Reguant's freedom of expression, thought and conscience and that she acted in accordance with the law under the protection of the provision that no witness can be forced to testify about a question whose answer could harm her morally or materially in a direct and important way (article 418 of the Criminal Procedure Law [LECrim]). He also assured that the request to withdraw the particular accusation of Vox was a demand repeated by different defendants during the trial of Catalonia independence leaders since it responded to criteria "only electoralist and, not only did it not prevent sexist ideologies, homophobic and racist, but the public authorities were asked to refrain from their commitment in the fight against the violation of fundamental rights". Finally, the letter assesses that a penalty of disqualification for events prior to the election as a deputy is "an unacceptable sacrifice of the right to political representation, and a flagrant violation of the principle of proportionality".

On 11 January 2022, CUP presented the campaign "Straight against Fascism" in front of the Market of Sant Antoni in Barcelona, a social and political mobilization initiative in defense of Reguant. The event was attended by representatives of neighborhood associations, as well as Òmnium Cultural, the Catalan National Assembly, the Xarxa d'Habitatge de l'Esquerra de l'Eixample, the Casal Popular Lina Òdena, the Committees for the Defense of the Republic and the Union of Students of the Catalan Countries. At her turn, the spokeswoman for the campaign, Núria Morell, denounced "that the far-right sets the direction of the State against independence is a fact that must be denounced and confronted". On 13 January, it was announced that 19 left-wing unions from all over Spain had supported the acquittal campaign by joining a manifesto denouncing the whitewashing of fascism by the Spanish judiciary, the obstacles reiterated to the popular will democratically expressed by the Catalan people and to the consolidation of far-right phenomena around the world. (Note: The unions that signed the manifesto in support of Reguant were: Confederación Intersindical Galega, Confederación Central Unitaria Intersindical de Trabajadoras de Galicia, Colectivo Unitario de Trabajadoras y Trabajadores de Aragón, Corriente Sindical d'izquierdas Asturies, ESK Euskal Herria, Intersindical Alternativa de Catalunya, Intersindical Canaria, Intersindical-Catalan Trade Union Confederation, Valencian Intersindical, Langile Abertzaleen Batzordeak (LAB), Sindicato Andaluz de Trabajadores y Trabajadoras, Sindicato Asambleario de Sanidad, Sendicato d'os Treballadors e Treballadoras d'Aragon-Sindicato Obrero Aragones, Sindicato 25 de Marzo Extremadura, Sindicato Asambleario de Sanidad, Solidaridad Obrera, Union of Workers and Inter-Union Workers of the Balearic Islands, STEILAS Euskal Herria.) On 16 January, in the streets of the Sant Antoni district of Barcelona, the first act of support took place with parliaments, a popular lunch and a concert by Carles Belda, accompanied by the presence of other elected officials from the political establishment such as Dolors Sabater, Carles Riera, Pau Juvillà, Montserrat Vinyets and Mireia Vehí. In it, the defendant stated that "disobedience is the best tool to stand up to the powers that want us on the margins" and that it was necessary to "use this case as a boomerang against the State, against this State that denies fundamental rights and systematically persecutes dissent, against this State which continues to persecute all those people who made possible the greatest act of political dissent and rebellion which was, on 1 October, the referendum of self-determination".

On 27 January, the Second Chamber of the Spanish Supreme Court notified her that the trial for serious disobedience would take place on 1 and 2 March 2022, with the acceptance of the evidences presented by the prosecution as well as the defense. Following the news, she publicly announced that she would make the statements in Catalan language. On February 23, the solidarity committee with Reguant held a political act of support at the Calabria 66 Auditorium in Barcelona, with the online participation of Anna Gabriel and Alberto Rodríguez, former deputies of CUP and Podemos, respectively. Moreover, they also participated in person Antonio Baños, the CUP deputy Pau Juvillà, the lawyer Norma Pedemonte, the writer Núria Cadenes and the journalist Laia Soldevilla. The event was also attended by deputies from Republican Left of Catalonia (ERC), Junts (JxCat) such as Jordi Turull, En Comú Podem and CUP, leaders of the Catalan National Assembly and Òmnium Cultural, and representatives of the associative movement from the neighborhood of Sant Antoni. The event concluded with a long round of applause prior to the participation on stage of David Carabén and Marc Lloret, Mishima's voice and guitar, who performed two songs. On February 28, a similar event was called in the Ecooo Club in Madrid, called "Dignidad versus Vox", in which the defendant participated, along with activists from the city's social and political movements, such as the Sindicato de Manteros, the Antifascist Coordinator of Madrid and Castilian Left, as well as the Catalan collectives Raval VS Vox and 8Mil motius, the CUP deputy Basha Changue and the reprisal for insults to the Crown Albert Baiges. Other displays of solidarity could be seen in the Balearic Islands when several sovereignist politicians and social activists published a video of support on 27 February and on the afternoon of 1 March they held a rally and read a manifesto in front of the Palma courts, located on Via Alemanya.

On 1 March, the first day of the trial was held, but the court declared its nullity after admitting an error in the processing of the case, as pointed out in the defense brief, and ordered the transfer of the case to the Supreme Prosecutor's Office. At the doors of the court, several elected officials from CUP, deputies Marta Vilalta (ERC), Pilar Calvo (Junts) and Gerardo Pisarello (UP), as well as the president of Òmnium Cultural Xavier Antich and the treasurer of the ANC Carles Gómez, gathered as a show of support. On 17 March, as a result of the declaration of nullity, the Supreme Court of Spain annulled the opening of the oral trial's interlocutory and the indictment of the prosecution, as well as ordered the appointment of an investigating magistrate for the case. This measure happened after the high court recognized his bad instruction for not taking into account her status as a member of a parliament from March 2021 and, therefore, as a court, the procedure could not be processed through an ordinary way as it was done until the fall of 2021.

On 19 May 2022, the Supreme Court announced that the trial for the crime of serious disobedience to authority would take place on 28 September of that same year and that she could testify in Catalan, as she had previously tendered. In response, Reguant assured on his twitter account that he would persist in working on "self-determination, independence and social justice for everyone" and that "neither partial justice, nor fascism, nor espionage will divert us from our goals". Also, CUP denounced that it was a "political trial" which meant "a flagrant violation of ideological freedom and conscience". In statements, CUP's deputy Xavier Pellicer expressed his disagreement with the trial and called it "another strategy to criminalize antifascist and independence ideologies". Specifically, he stated that Reguant "wanted to highlight the anomaly of the presence of Vox as a popular accusation against the right to self-determination", in addition to "denouncing the collusion between the far-right and the judicial Spanish apparatus", making it clear that "the State spies on us, disables us, retaliates..., and now also allows Reguant to face another political trial".

On 29 August 2022, in an interview just one month before the trial, she expressed no fear about disqualification because she knew it was a reality, that she "didn't expect much" from the trial and reinforced her position by assuring that "the decision was good and necessary, because it was necessary to point out the fascism that became visible with Vox as a particular accusation". On 7 October 2022, during the trial, the Supreme Prosecutor's Office reduced the request to a sentence of 4 months in prison and 4 months of disqualification from passive suffrage. Nevertheless, the Criminal Chamber of the Supreme Court convicted her with a fine of 13,500 euros for committing serious disobedience, after not having responded to Vox during the trial of Catalonia independence leaders, but did not disqualify her from the position of deputy of the Parliament of Catalonia. Two months later, on 7 December 2022, Reguant's defense presented a recurso de amparo to the Constitutional Court of Spain with the argument that fundamental rights had been violated such as the effective judicial protection, the presumption of innocence, the criminal legality, the freedom of expression, the freedom of ideology and the freedom of conscience. Finally, on 12 December 2022, the support committee organized an end-of-campaign event called "The judicial protection of the extreme right" at the University of Barcelona, which was participated by Eulàlia Reguant and Antonio Baños. The event was attended by the spokespersons of ERC's parliamentary group, Marta Vilalta and Jordi Orobitg, and the president of Òmnium Cultural, Xavier Antich. The presence of representatives of Junts and the Catalan National Assembly was also planned but, due to last-minute issues, they were absent.

However, finally, on 7 March 2023 she paid the fine of 13.500 euros and was freed from criminal liability for disobedience.
