= Contender (dinghy) =

International racing sailing class

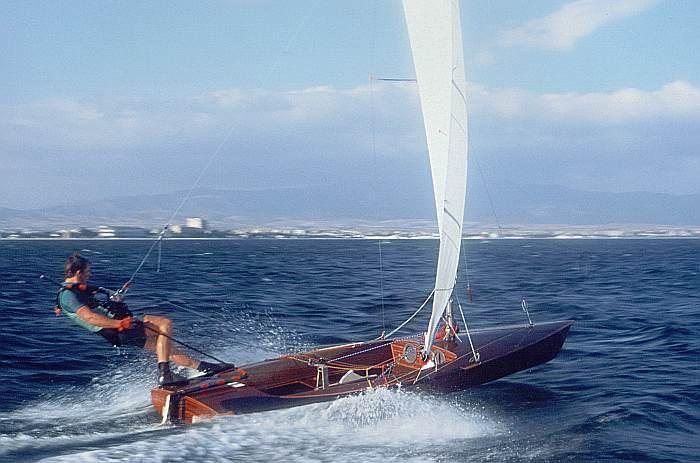
- A Contender on reach at the 1998 worlds

Development
- Designer: Ben Lexcen
- Location: Australia
- Year: 1967
- Design: One-Design
- Role: Fleet racing

Boat
- Crew: 1
- Draft: 1,447 mm (57.0 in)
- Trapeze: Single trapeze

Hull
- Type: Monohull
- Construction: GRP; Wood; Composite (Wood/GRP)
- Hull weight: 83 kg (183 lb)
- LOA: 4,875 mm (191.9 in)
- Beam: 1,500 mm (59 in)

Hull appendages
- Keel: Centreboard
- Rudder: skeg hung

Rig
- General: Bermuda rig
- I foretriangle height: 4,345 mm (171.1 in)
- J foretriangle base: 1,250 mm (49 in)
- P mainsail luff: 3,050 mm (120 in)
- E mainsail foot: 2,700 mm (110 in)
- Mast height: 6,427 mm (253.0 in)

Sails
- Mainsail area: 10.8 m^{2} (116 sq ft)

Racing
- D-PN: 90.1
- RYA PN: 970

The International Contender is a single-handed high performance sailing dinghy, designed by Bob Miller, latterly known as Ben Lexcen, (Australia) in 1967 as a possible successor to the Finn dinghy for Olympic competition.

The Contender is recognised as an International Class by World Sailing, the governing body of sail boat racing, which administers the class rules.

== Background ==
"Single-handed" means sailed by only one person. The boat has a trapeze which allows the sailor to use their weight more effectively. The design of the boat does not favour sailors within a narrow or extreme size or weight range, past champions have ranged from 60 kg to more than 90 kg. While physical fitness, agility and strength are advantageous, good technical sailing skills and experience can count for more.

Sailors wishing to master the Contender must learn how to trapeze and steer the boat at the same time, and how to move about the boat while keeping it level. As part of race tuning, the Contender mast is commonly raked well aft, which results in restricted space between the boom and deck. Tacking consequently requires technique and practice to avoid getting stuck under the boom. Sailing the boat level at all times (except in very light winds) is fastest and reduces capsizes, which can happen fast if the boom dips into the water. There is a trade-off between raking the mast far aft and keeping the kicker (boom vang) tight at all times (which is faster) and the higher probability of capsizing due to this less forgiving set up. Unlike older and heavier dinghy designs, the Contender requires the centerboard to be lowered at least somewhat to avoid quick capsizes when reaching and running in a breeze.

== Class rule changes ==
The class rules are overseen by the International Contender Association. Proposals for changes to the rules are written down and presented to the class members during the Annual General Meeting (AGM). Before a rule change is taken into effect, the proposal needs to be approved by 2/3 of the member attending the AGM. If the proposal is approved, a next voting round will be done using a postal ballot. If a majority approves, the proposal will go to World Sailing for their approval. If this passes, the rules are updated and effected. Notable changes to the class rules are for instance:

- allow other materials than aluminium for masts; proposal in 2000 and a rule change in 2002
- allow loose footed sail; proposal in 2000 and a rule change in 2002
- allow other material than aluminium for the boom; proposal in 2002 and a rule change in 2003

The Contender Microsite on World Sailing has a section with the latest class rules.

== Events ==
=== European Championships ===
Year	Location	First	Second	Third	Ref
1974	Germany, Kiel	David Pitman (GBR)			
1975	Sweden, Strömstad	David Pitman (GBR)			
1976	Great Britain, Hayling Island	Joachim Harpprecht (GER)			
1977	Netherlands, Medemblik	Paul Wells (USA)			
1978	Italy, Lake Garda	Tony Smith (GBR)			
1979	Switzerland, Lake Silvaplana	Geoff Whitfield (GBR)			
1980 ?	Germany, Travemunde				
1983	Italy, Porto Sant'Elpidio	Keith Paul (GBR)	Joachim Harpprecht (GER)		
1985 ?	Denmark, Struer				
1988	Netherlands, Medemblik	Barry Watson (AUS)			
1989	Italy, Imperia	Andrea Bonezzi (ITA)	Carlo Magnoni (ITA)	Roberto Lorenzi (ITA)	
1992	Sweden, Båstad	Graham Scott (GBR)			
1995	Germany, Warnemünde	Graham Scott (GBR)			
1997	Denmark, Aarhus	Ian Renilson (GBR)	Frank Suchanek (GER)	Jason Beebe (AUS)	
2001	France, Loctudy	Ian Renilson (GBR)	Christian Brandt (GER)	Stuart Jones (GBR)	
2002	Denmark, Hellerup	Graham Scott (GBR)	Andrea Bonezzi (ITA)	Giovanni Bonzio (ITA)	
2006	Austria, Ebensee	Christoph Homeier (GER)	Andrea Bonezzi (ITA)	Giovanni Bonzio (ITA)	
2008	Italy, Punta Alta	Giovanni Bonzio (ITA)	Marcus Hamilton (AUS)	Andrea Bonezzi (ITA)	
2010	France, La Rochelle	Andrea Bonezzi (ITA)	Bjarke Johnsen (DEN)	Simon Mussell (GBR)	
2012	Sweden, Gottskär	Andrea Bonezzi (ITA)	Graham Scott (GBR)	Jesper Nielsen (DEN)	
2014	Germany, Kühlungsborn	Søren Dulong Andreasen (DEN)	Max Billerbeck (GER)	Jesper Nielsen (DEN)	
2016	Great Britain, Highcliffe	Simon Mussell (GBR)	Jesper Nielsen (DEN)	Jan Von Der Bank (GER)	
2018	Italy, Lake Garda	Søren Dulong Andreasen (DEN)	Marco Ferrari (ITA)	Antonio Lambertini (ITA)	
2021	Germany, Warnemünde	Jesper Armbrust (DEN)	Max Billerbeck (GER)	Soren Dulong Andreasen (DEN)	
