= RS Feva =

International racing sailing dinghy

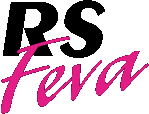
- Class symbol

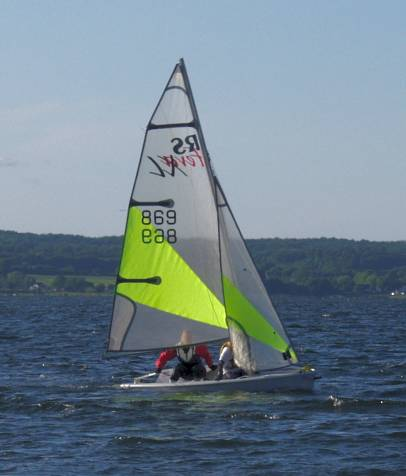
- Sailing at Præstø Sailing Club

Development
- Designer: Paul Handley
- Year: 2002
- Design: One-Design

Boat
- Crew: 1-3, with a manufacturer recommendation of 2

Hull
- Type: Monohull
- Hull weight: 139 lb (63 kg)
- LOA: 12 ft 0 in (3.66 m)
- Beam: 4 ft 8 in (1.42 m)

Hull appendages
- Keel: Daggerboard

Rig
- Rig type: Bermuda

Sails
- Mainsail area: S rig - 57 sq ft (5.3 m^{2}); XL rig - 68 sq ft (6.3 m^{2})-
- Jib/genoa area: 22 sq ft (2.0 m^{2})
- Spinnaker area: 73 sq ft (6.8 m^{2})

Rating
- D-PN: 105.2
- RYA PN: 1210 (Feva XL)

The RS Feva is a modern double-handed sailing dinghy designed by Paul Handley in 2002. It is manufactured and distributed by RS Sailing. The RS Feva is a World Sailing International Class, a Royal Yachting Association (RYA) Supported Junior Class, and has been selected by the Dansk Sejlunion (Danish Sailing Association) and Norges Seilforbund (Norwegian Sailing Federation) for major sailing growth projects.

Built from rotomoulded polyethylene, it bridges the gap between entry-level boats such as the RS Tera and high-performance skiffs like the 29er. Its stability, durable construction, and manageable performance have made it a popular junior double-handed class.

The RS Feva's layout is designed for simplicity and learning progression. All control lines are within easy reach, and the self-draining cockpit allows quick recovery after capsizes. The asymmetric spinnaker system uses a single-line hoist and drop, encouraging teamwork and tactical awareness. The hull's wide beam and chine shape provide excellent stability and planing ability, allowing young sailors to experience real performance sailing in moderate winds without the intimidation of trapezes or large sails.

== Performance and design ==
The RS Feva is available in two versions; the RS Feva S and RS Feva XL.

The RS Feva S is the pleasure-sailing version, with a "soft" unbattened mainsail and can be upgraded to add a jib and/or gennaker.

The RS Feva XL is the racing version, with the same hull and spars as the RS Feva S but the sail package comprises a full-battened mylar racing mainsail and includes the jib and gennaker. The design allows both the jib and gennaker to be used at the same time for power reaching. When racing in a mixed fleet, the RS Feva XL uses a Portsmouth Yardstick handicap of 1210 in the UK or 105.2 in the USA.

The boat is suitable to be sailed by two young sailors or by adult and child teams, the RS Feva may also be sailed single-handed.

The RS Feva is popular in Europe, Australia and Hong Kong, and is being re-introduced to the market in North America.

In the United Kingdom the RS Feva has been approved by the RYA for the RYA OnBoard scheme, and by schools (e.g. Claires Court School, Oakham School, Sevenoaks School), sailing centres and clubs (e.g. Hayling Island Sailing Club and Hill Head Sailing Club) for their junior sailing programmes.

== International recognition and support ==
- The RS Feva has International Sailing Federation (ISAF) International Class status.
- The RS Feva has won the Coup de Coeur Award in France.
- The RS Feva has previously won the Dinghy of the Year Award in the USA.
- The RS Feva is a Royal Yachting Association (RYA) Supported Junior Class.

RS Feva owners and sailors around the World are supported by an International Class Association and a network of National Class Associations which organise the World, European and National Championships.

== European Championships ==
| Championship | Host country | Host Venue | Entries | European Champions |
|---|---|---|---|---|
| 2007 | Ireland | Waterford Harbour Sailing Club, County Waterford | | (gold) Sofia Engstrom & Frida Langenius (SWE); (silver) Guy Stephens & Rory Spriggs (GBR); (bronze) Simona Benelli & Matilde Pitanti (ITA) |
| 2009 | Italy | Yacht Club Acquafresca, Lake Garda | | (gold) Ollie Cooper & Callum Ellis (GBR); (silver) Alice Kent & Lucy Childs (GBR); (bronze) Conor Lyden & Peter Stokes (IRL) |
| 2014 | Netherlands | Aquavitesse, Bruinisse | | Overall: (gold) Harvey Martin & Bobby Hewitt (GBR); (silver) Jack Lewis & Lucas Marshall (GBR); (bronze) Nikol Stankova & Veronika Piklova (CZE); Ladies: (gold) Nikol Stankova & Veronika Piklova (CZE); (silver) Nynke Verwoerd & Annabel Wickel (NED); (bronze) Kotryna Kašėtaitė & Daumantė Petraitytė (LTU) |

== National Championships ==
=== United Kingdom ===
| Year | Host country | Host Venue | Entries | National Champions |
|---|---|---|---|---|
| 2003 | United Kingdom | Warsash Sailing Club, Hampshire | 50 | (gold) Ben Saxton & Tim Saxton (GBR); (silver) Alex Henry & Henry Maxfield (GBR); (bronze) Sophie Weguelin & Imogen Stanley (GBR) |
| 2004 | United Kingdom | Paignton Sailing Club, Devon | 24 | (gold) Ben Saxton & Tim Saxton (GBR); (silver) Frances Peters & Claire Lasko (GBR); (bronze) James Peters & Peter Henry (GBR) |
| 2005 | United Kingdom | Hayling Island Sailing Club, Hampshire | 66 | (gold) Frances Peters & Clare Lasko (GBR); (silver) James Peters & Guy Stevens (GBR); (bronze) Ben Saxton & Tim Saxton (GBR) |
| 2006 | United Kingdom | Hayling Island Sailing Club, Hampshire | 85 | (gold) Aaron Smith & Jeremy Williamson (GBR); (silver) James Peters & Ben Gratton (GBR); (bronze) Rob Cage & Georgina Cage (GBR) |
| 2007 | United Kingdom | Whitstable Yacht Club, Kent | 65 | (gold) Barry Parkin & Jack Parkin (GBR); (silver) Tim Gratton & Chris Taylor (GBR); (bronze) James Hamer & Ben Gratton (GBR) |
| 2008 | United Kingdom | Hayling Island Sailing Club, Hampshire | 80 | (gold) Tim Gratton & Chris Taylor (GBR); (silver) Alex Mothersele & Hamish Ellis (GBR); (bronze) James Bolingbroke & Matt Heathcote (GBR) |
| 2009 | United Kingdom | Weymouth and Portland National Sailing Academy, Dorset | 72 | (gold) Tim Gratton & Chris Taylor (GBR); (silver) Debbie Darling & Tim Darling (GBR); (bronze) Owen Bowerman & Charlie Darling (GBR) |
| 2010 | United Kingdom | Hayling Island Sailing Club, Hampshire | 115 | (gold) Robert Baddeley & James Taylor (GBR); (silver) Jack Hawkins & Chris Thomas (GBR); (bronze) Jack Parkin & Milli Parkin (GBR) |
| 2011 | United Kingdom | South Caernarvonshire Yacht Club, Abersoch, Gwynedd | 102 | (gold) Owen Bowerman & Charlie Darling (GBR); (silver) Matt Whitfield & Gareth Viney (GBR); (bronze) Debbie Darling & Tom Darling (GBR) |
| 2012 | United Kingdom | Royal Torbay Yacht Club, Devon | 103 | (gold) Matthew Whitfield & James Taylor (GBR); (silver) Robert Masterman & Marcus Payne (GBR); (bronze) Elliott Wells & Jake Todd (GBR) |
| 2015 | United Kingdom | Rutland Sailing Club, Rutland | 103 | (gold) Fin Armstrong & Dan Armstrong (GBR); (silver) Iain Bird & Jake Hardman (GBR); (bronze) Rory Odell & Josh Bonsey (GBR) |

=== Other ===
| Year | Host country | Host Venue | Entries | National Champions |
|---|---|---|---|---|
| 2011 | Ireland | Royal Cork Yacht Club, County Cork | | (gold) David Whitaker & Jil McGinley (IRL); (silver) Marc Cudmore & Sarah Cudmore (IRL); (bronze) Sam McGinley & Richard McGinley (IRL) |
| 2011 | Netherlands | KR&ZV de Maas, Muiden | | |
| 2011 | Sweden | Gottskär, Halland | | |
