= Vita Heathcote =

British sailor (born 2001)

Vita Heathcote OLY
Personal information
- Nationality: British
- Born: 8 July 2001 (age 25) Southampton, Hampshire, England

Sailing career
- Sport: Sailing
- Club: Royal Lymington Yacht Club
- Classes: 420, 470
Medal record
Sailing
Representing Great Britain
420 World Championships
Gold medal – first place	2019 Vilamoura Portugal	Women's 420
470 World Championships
Silver medal – second place	2024 Mallorca Spain	Mixed 470
470 European Championship
Bronze medal – third place	2021 Vilamoura Portugal	Mixed 470

Vita Heathcote OLY (born 8 July 2001) is a British sailor who won a gold medal at the 2019 420 World Championships in the women's category and silver at the 2024 470 World Championships in the mixed section. She represented Great Britain at the 2024 Summer Olympics.

== Career ==
Having begun sailing aged just five, Heathcote, whose uncle is from two-time Olympic silver medal-winning sailor Nick Rogers, won multiple accolades at age-group levels and joined the British Sailing Team in 2019.

She claimed the women's gold medal at the 2019 420 World Championships in Vilamoura, Portugal, alongside Milly Boyle.

At the same venue, she won bronze with Ryan Orr in the mixed category at the 2021 470 European Championship.

Heathcote formed a new mixed 470 partnership with two-time Olympian Chris Grube for the 2023 Sailing World Championships in The Hague, Netherlands, where they finished 13th, narrowly missing out on qualification for the 2024 Summer Olympics.

However, in March 2024, the duo took silver at the 470 World Championships in Mallorca, Spain, which, when combined with another British boat coming ninth, was enough to secure a last-minute qualifying quota place for the Games in Paris.

Later that month Team GB officially confirmed the pairing's selection making Heathcote the youngest member of the 2024 British Olympic Sailing team.

In May 2024, Heathcote and Grube came 16th at the 2024 470 European Championship held at the Yacht Club de Cannes in France.

At the Olympics, Heathcote and Grube finished 11th, missing out on the final day medal race by one place having ended one point off the top ten.
