= George Kavas =

Greek sailor

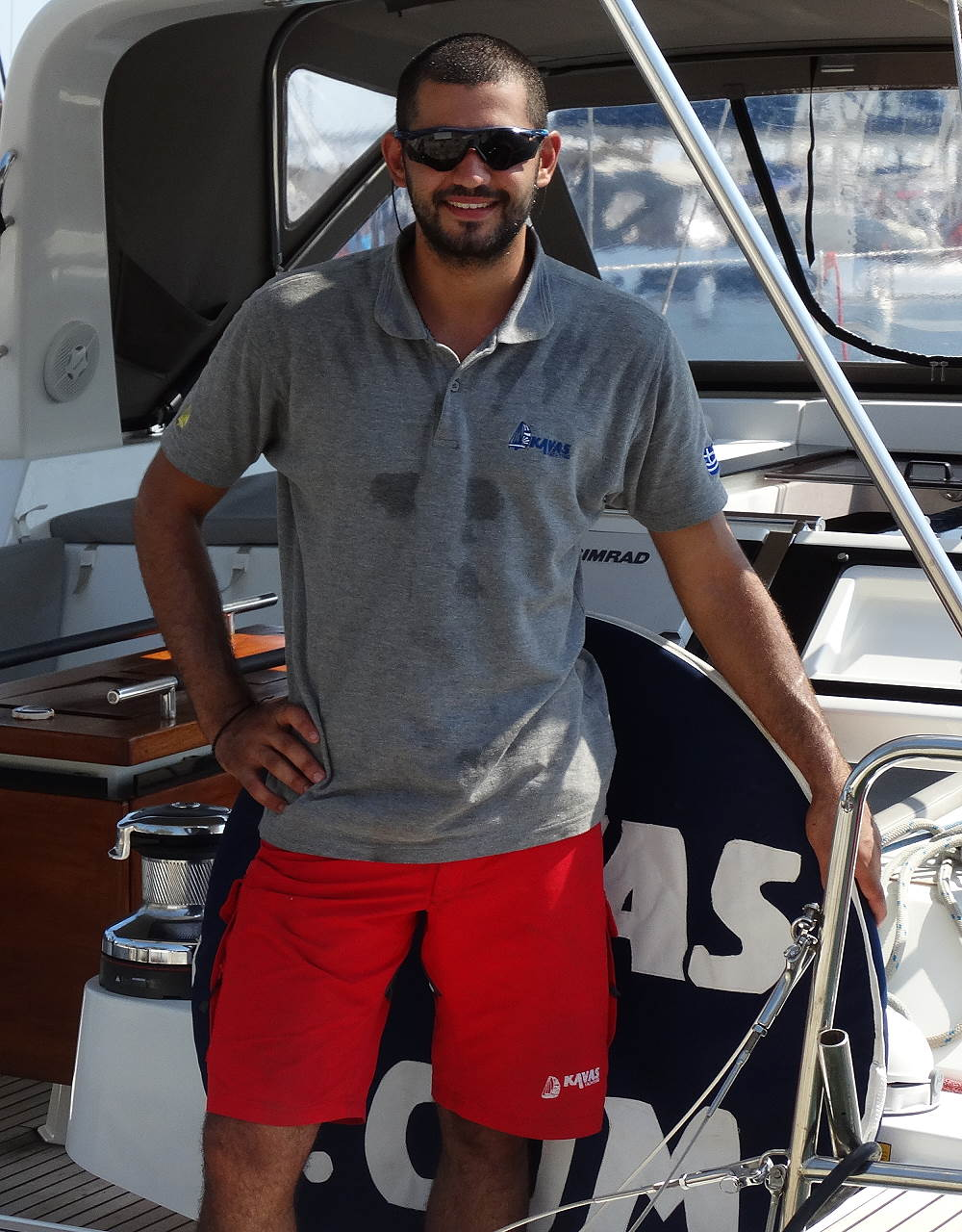

Personal information
- Born: 26 March 1995 (age 31)

Sailing career
- Sport: Sailing

George Kavas (born 26 March 1995) is a Greek sailor. He was educated at the Nautical Lyceum of Peiraeus in Athens, in 2013 he graduated with honours and attended the National Technical University of Athens as a Naval Architect.

Along with his brothers and teammates Alexander Kavas & Theofanis Kavas has won numerous races and championships both in Greece and abroad starting from an early age with the Optimist (dinghy) class and later moving on to 420 (dinghy) and 470 class.

== Career highlights ==
=== Optimist (dinghy) Racing Category ===
2005 - (gold) Athens, Greece 1st Place National Junior Championship
(Europe) 2006 - (silver) 2nd Overall Balkan Optimist Championship
2006 - (gold) Athens, Greece 1st Overall World Championship Junior Qualifier
2006 - (gold) Athens, Greece 1st Place National Junior Championship
2007 - (gold) Athens, Greece 1st Place National Junior Championship
(Europe) 2007 - (bronze) 3rd Overall Balkan Optimist Championship
2007 - (silver) Vigo, Spain 2nd Place Semana Caixanova del Atlantico
2007 - (gold) Cagliari, Italy 1st Place Optimist World Championship with his brother Theofanis Kavas and 3 more Greek teammates

=== 420 (dinghy) Racing Category ===
2010 - (gold) Athens, Greece 1st Place National Championship
(Europe) 2010 - (silver) Athens, Greece 2nd Overall European Youth Championship
2011 - (gold) Rafina, Greece 1st Place National Championship
2011 - (gold) Tavira, Portugal 1st Overall European Championship with his brother Alexander Kavas
2011 - (bronze) Kieler Woche, Germany 3rd Overall European Championship with his brother Alexander Kavas
2011 - (silver) Nieuwpoort, Belgium 2nd Overall European Youth Championship with his brother Alexander Kavas
2012 - (gold) Paros, Greece 1st Place National Championship
2012 - (gold) Lake Neusiedl, Austria 1st Overall 1st Men and Junior World Championship with his brother Alexander Kavas

=== 470 (dinghy) Racing Category ===
2012 - Takapuna, New Zealand 10th Overall World Youth Championship
2012 - Lake Garda, Italy 4th Overall European Youth Championship
(Europe) 2012 - (gold) 1st Overall Balkan Youth Championship
(Europe) 2012 - (silver) 2nd Overall Balkan Championship
2013 - Athens, Greece 4th Place National Championship
2013 - (bronze) Thessaloniki, Greece 3rd Overall National Championship with his brother Alexander Kavas
2013 - La Rochelle, France 12th Place in Youth, 33rd Overall World Championship with his brother Alexander Kavas
