= Cathy Foster =

British sailor (born 1956)

Personal information
- Nationality: British
- Born: 28 February 1956 (age 70) Frimley, England

Sport
- Sport: Sailing

Catherine "Cathy" E. Foster (born 28 February 1956) is a British sailor. She competed in the 470 event at the 1984 Summer Olympics where she was the only female sailor to qualify and compete. She finished 2nd in the open 420 World Championship and won two Women's World Championship titles but sailing didn't introduce female specific events till the 1988 Olympic Games. She went on into Olympic and Paralympic sailing coaching and campaigned towards the 2004 Olympic Games.
