= 2024 RS Tera World Championships =

14th RS Tera World Championship

Event title
- Name: 2024 RS Tera World Championships
- Edition: 14th
- Host: Køge Bay Sailing Club, Aarhus, Denmark

Event details
- Venue: Køge Bay Sailing Club
- Dates: August 5–8

Results
- (gold) Gold: RS Tera Sport: (United Kingdom) Rafe Bradley; RS Tera Pro: (United Kingdom) William Stratton-Brown
- (silver) Silver: RS Tera Sport: (Ukraine) Yevhenii Kuzmenko; RS Tera Pro: (United Kingdom) Cassius Day
- (bronze) Bronze: RS Tera Sport: (United States) Lin Zhou; RS Tera Pro: (Lithuania) Rimsa Rokas

The 2024 RS Tera World Championships was a sailing world championship event in the RS Tera that took place at the Køge Bay Sailing Club in Aarhus, Denmark. British sailors Rafe Bradley and William Stratton-Brown won in the Sport and Pro classes respectively.

== Results ==
=== RS Tera Sport ===
Top 20 sailors shown only:

Pos	Athlete	R1	R2	R3	R4	R5	R6	R7	R8	R9	R10	R11	R12	Total points	Net Points
1	Rafe Bradley (GBR)	5	2	1	1	(63) BFD	(6)	1	1	1	5	3	1	90	21
2	Yevhenii Kuzmenko (UKR)	4	3	3	2	(5)	2	4	2	2	1	(14)	3	45	26
3	Lin Zhou (USA)	1	1	2	4	2	1	5	4	(63) UFD	7	5	(63) BFD	158	32
4	Hannah Yates (GBR)	2	10	4	(17)	7	12	2	3	7	(16)	6	6	92	59
5	Pavlo Zinchenko (UKR)	(17)	5	8	3	4	(63) UFD	9	7	5	2	11	7	141	61
6	Jasper Jenkinson (GBR)	8	(26)	(12)	10	3	9	7	5	11	9	8	2	110	72
7	Joseph Hulse (GBR)	6	8	6	14	(63) BFD	8	14	9	4	3	1	(17)	153	73
8	Harry O'Callaghan (GBR)	3	(13)	(15)	6	6	10	6	12	6	8	10	9	104	76
9	Harry Wilson (GBR)	(26)	(21)	18	7	1	4	3	10	8	15	2	10	128	78
10	Molly Wilson (GBR)	11	4	(16)	12	(63) BFD	13	8	8	3	14	9	4	165	86
11	Thomas Hill (GBR)	12	(25)	13	5	12	14	16	13	(63) RET	4	4	20	201	113
12	Dokoupil Hynek (CZE)	10	18	5	8	17	5	17	(19)	15	17	(19)	5	155	117
13	Laia Priestley (GBR)	(22)	6	7	(27)	10	15	10	16	20	13	12	8	166	117
14	Ethan Watkin Jones (GBR)	(23)	12	19	(63) DNF	9	3	12	11	13	10	20	21	216	130
15	Lucie Tkacová (CZE)	13	11	11	11	20	(63) UFD	19	14	10	11	(63) DSQ	13	259	133
16	Viktor Vlach (CZE)	24	7	9	20	(26)	17	15	15	18	12	7	(29)	199	144
17	Aggie Priestley (GBR)	15	15	17	18	(63) BFD	23	11	17	22	6	(26)	12	245	156
18	Phoebe Greenhalgh (GBR)	20	14	(33)	13	16	24	13	6	19	30	18	(35)	241	173
19	Edward Knowles (GBR)	(33)	17	(40)	22	11	22	21	18	12	28	16	11	251	178
20	Tom Solly (GBR)	21	24	14	9	21	7	22	21	17	23	(27)	(26)	232	179

=== RS Tera Pro ===
Top 15 sailors shown only:

Pos	Athlete	R1	R2	R3	R4	R5	R6	R7	R8	R9	R10	R11	R12	Total points	Net Points
1	William Stratton-Brown (GBR)	(2)	1	1	1	1	1	1	(58) BFD	1	1	2	1	71	11
2	Cassius Day (GBR)	1	3.3 RDG	(7)	2	3	2	2	(5)	4	2	1	5	37.3	25.3
3	Rimsa Rokas (LTU)	5	4	2	4	(9)	(7)	3	2	2	4	3	3	48	32
4	Dmytro Antipin (UKR)	(14)	2	8	3	2	3	(58) DSQ	4	10	3	13	6	126	54
5	Pärtel Orusalu (EST)	6	(17)	3	16	10	6	4	1	3	(58) UFD	6	7	137	62
6	Viktor Romanovych (UKR)	7	3	4	(12)	6	(19)	10	8	12	6	4	4	95	64
7	Trinette Välisson (EST)	4	13	(17)	7	17	8	(58) UFD	3	5	5	7	2	146	71
8	Ben Angell (GBR)	11	(24)	15	8	4	10	6	6	7	(39)	10	11	151	88
9	Matthew Boatman (GBR)	(28)	(45)	23	5	14	5	19	10	8	10	8	9	184	111
10	Pippa Paley (GBR)	23	10	12	15	32	17	9	7	6	9	(46)	(34)	220	140
11	Aedan Hadaway (GBR)	(33)	9	(41)	32	20	12	7	9	20	20	5	8	216	142
12	Megan Gowers (GBR)	13	(58) BFD	9	18	15	28	11	27	18	(29)	15	15	256	169
13	Simon Kratky (CZE)	15	(46)	6	14	29	15	12	(58) DSQ	9	21	30	19	274	170
14	Fallon Day (GBR)	10	(58) BFD	21	9	26	27	8	(58) BFD	27	19	9	17	289	173
15	Jessica Skelding (GBR)	3	11	20	35	30	9	14	(58) BFD	22	15	21	(37)	275	180
