= Gwendolyn Lemaitre =

French yacht racer

Medal record

Sailing

Representing France

Mediterranean Games
Silver medal – second place	2005 Almería	Women's 470

Gwendolyn Lemaitre (born 4 September 1986) is a French yacht racer who competed in the 2008 Summer Olympics.
