= Odysseas Spanakis =

Greek sailor

Personal information
- Full name: Odysseas Emmanouil Spanakis
- Nationality: Greece
- Born: February 4, 2003 (age 23)
- Family: Ariadne Spanaki (sister)

Sailing career
- Sport: Sailing
- Class: 470

Odysseas Emmanouil Spanakis (born February 4, 2003) is a Greek sailor who competed alongside his sister Ariadne Spanaki in the 470 event at the 2024 Summer Olympics.
