= Chris Grube =

British sailor

Personal information
- Full name: Christian Eugene Grube
- Nickname: Twiggy
- Nationality: British
- Born: 22 January 1985 (age 41) Chester, Cheshire, England, UK
- Height: 194 cm (6 ft 4 in)
- Weight: 72 kg (159 lb)

Sailing career
- Sport: Sailing
Medal record
Sailing
Representing Great Britain
470 World Championships
Silver medal – second place	2024 Mallorca Spain	Mixed 470

Christian Eugene Grube (born 22 January 1985) is a British sailor who competed at the 2016 Summer Olympics in Rio de Janeiro, Brazil, the 2020 Summer Olympics in Tokyo, Japan, and 2024 Summer Olympics in Paris, France.

== Personal life ==
Grube was born on 22 January 1985 in Chester, United Kingdom. He is nicknamed "Twiggy".

== Sailing career ==
Grube competed alongside two-time Olympic silver medallist Nick Rogers in the men's 470 dinghy class in an attempt to qualify for the 2012 Summer Olympics in London but the pair were beaten out for selection to the one quota place in the British team by Luke Patience and Stuart Bithell who went on to win the silver medal.

In 2013 he teamed up with Bithell to compete in the 49er skiff class and attempt to qualify for the 2016 Summer Olympics. In 2014, Grube teamed up with two-time Olympian Stevie Morrison and finished fifth in their first race together at the World Cup event in Melbourne, Australia. At their next World Cup event in Miami in January 2014 they finished third.

At the 2014 ISAF Sailing World Championships held in Santander, Spain Grube competed in the 49er class alongside Morrison. The pair finished 11th and were then dropped from the Royal Yachting Association (RYA) elite Olympic Podium squad.

In December 2015, Grube paired up with Luke Patience in the 470 class. Patience had already qualified for the 2016 Olympics alongside Elliot Willis but was forced to find a new partner and requalify after Willis was diagnosed with bowel cancer and had to withdraw to undergo treatment.

In their first event together, Copa De Brazil in December 2015 they took second, followed by a 5th at the 2016 470 World Championship in Argentina. In May 2016 Patience and Grube were confirmed as the Great Britain team's entry for the men's 470 in Rio.

Grube and Patience again qualified to represent Great Britain at the 2020 Summer Olympics in the 470 class.

In March 2024, Grube won a silver medal in the mixed category at the 470 World Championships in Mallorca, Spain, alongside Vita Heathcote which, when combined with another British boat coming ninth, was enough to secure a last-minute qualifying for place for the 2024 Summer Olympics. Later that month Team GB officially confirmed the pairing's selection for the Games in Paris.
