= Simon Cooke =

New Zealand sailor

Personal information
- Nationality: New Zealand
- Born: 25 September 1976 (age 49) Hamilton, New Zealand

Sport
- Sport: Sailing

Sailing career
- Club: Kohimarama Yacht Club

Simon Cooke (born 25 September 1976) is a New Zealand sailor. He competed in the men's 470 event at the 2000 Summer Olympics. In 2002, he won the world championship 470 event with Peter Nicholas. In 2019, he coached the Thailand team for the world championships held in Japan. He is a World Champion winning the 2002 470 World Championship and two-time RS Feva World Champion.
