= Gottskär =

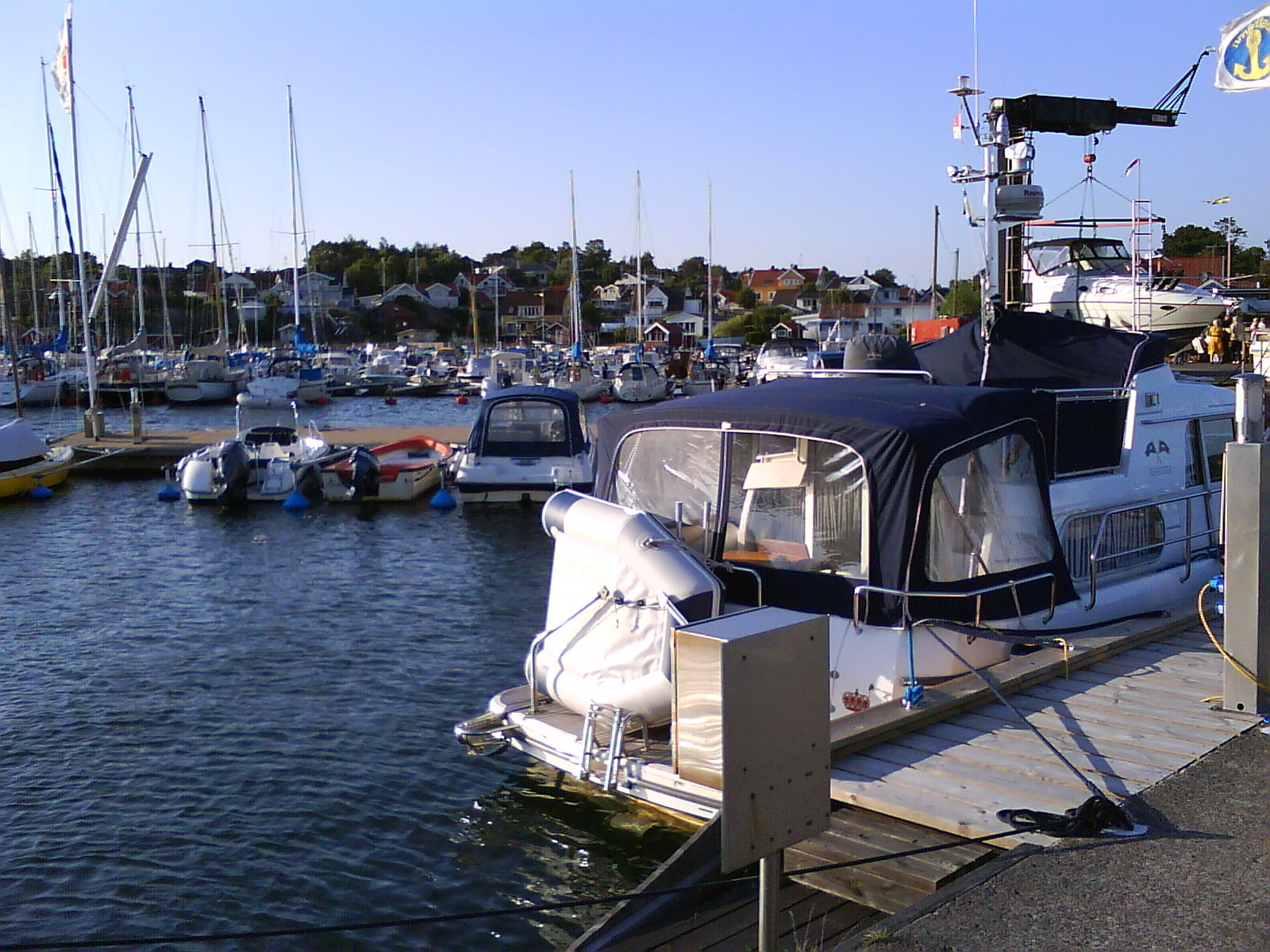
- Port of Gottskär

- Location within Halland Location within Västra Götaland Location within Sweden
- Coordinates: 57°23′N 12°1′E
- Country: Sweden
- Province: Halland
- County: Halland County
- Municipality: Kungsbacka Municipality

Area
  - Total: 345 km^{2} (133 sq mi)

Population (2000)
  - Total: 3,541
  - Density: 1,026/km^{2} (2,660/sq mi)
- Time zone: UTC+1 (CET)
  - Summer (DST): UTC+2 (CEST)

Gottskär is a village in Sweden in the municipality of Kungsbacka in the county of Halland. It covers an area of 345 hectares. In 2000, it had 3,541 inhabitants.

The village has been used as event location for several sailing championships. For example in 2008 the World Championships of the RS Feva and in 2012 the European Championships of the Contender.
