= 420 (dinghy) =

Ship type

- Class symbol

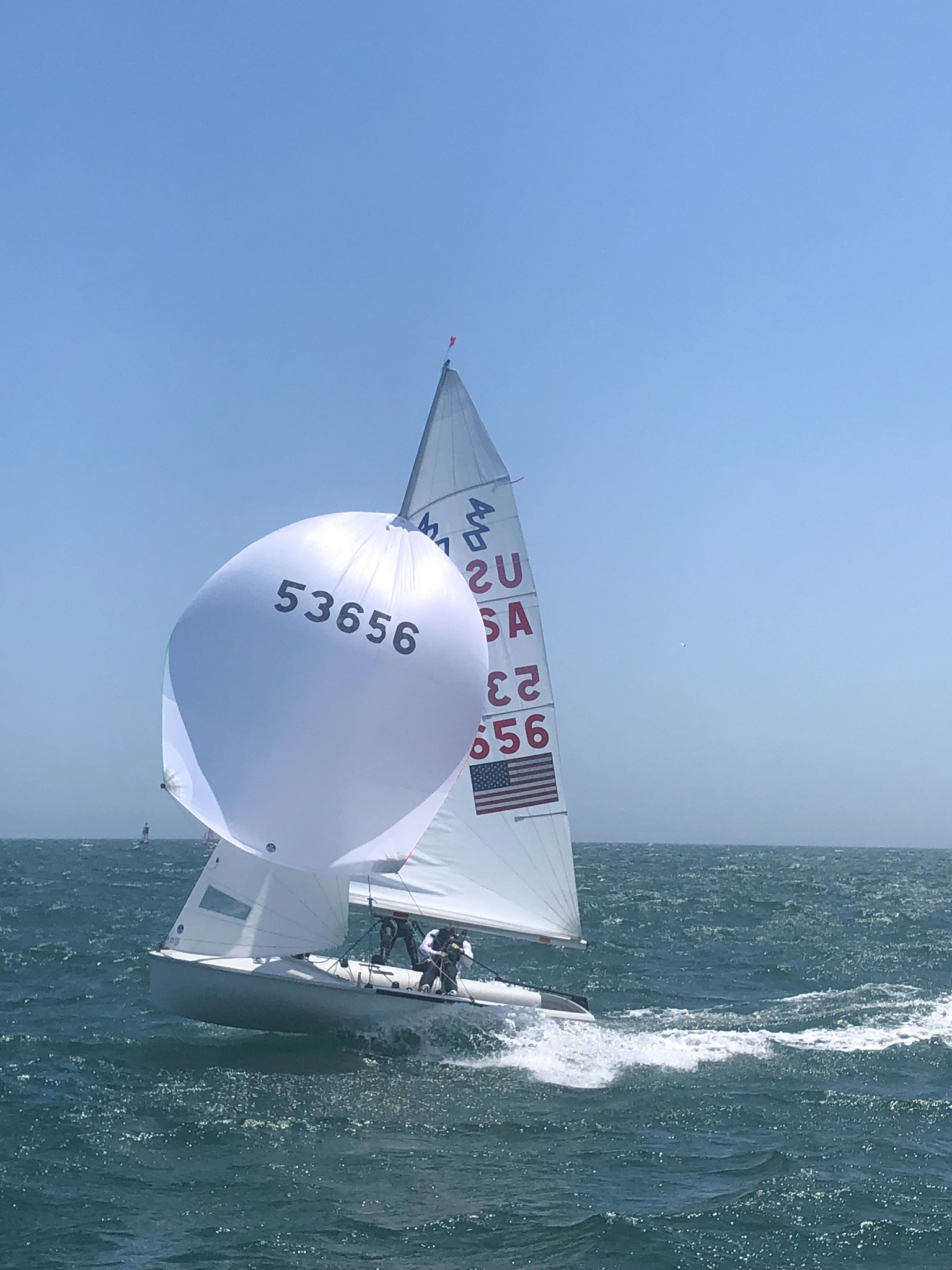
- A 420 under sail

Development
- Designer: Christian Maury
- Location: France
- Year: 1959
- Design: One-Design
- Role: Youth trainer, racing

Boat
- Displacement: 100 kilograms (220 lb)
- Draft: 0.965 metres (3 ft 2.0 in)
- Trapeze: Single

Hull
- Type: Monohull
- Construction: GRP
- Hull weight: 80 kilograms (180 lb)
- LOA: 4.20 metres (13 ft 9 in)
- Beam: 1.63 metres (5 ft 4 in)

Hull appendages
- Keel: Centerboard

Rig
- Rig type: Bermuda
- Mast height: 6.26 metres (20 ft 6 in)

Sails
- Mainsail area: 7.45 square metres (80.2 sq ft)
- Jib/genoa area: 2.8 square metres (30 sq ft)
- Spinnaker area: 8.83 square metres (95.0 sq ft)
- Upwind sail area: 10.25 square metres (110.3 sq ft)

Rating
- D-PN: 97.6
- RYA PN: 1087

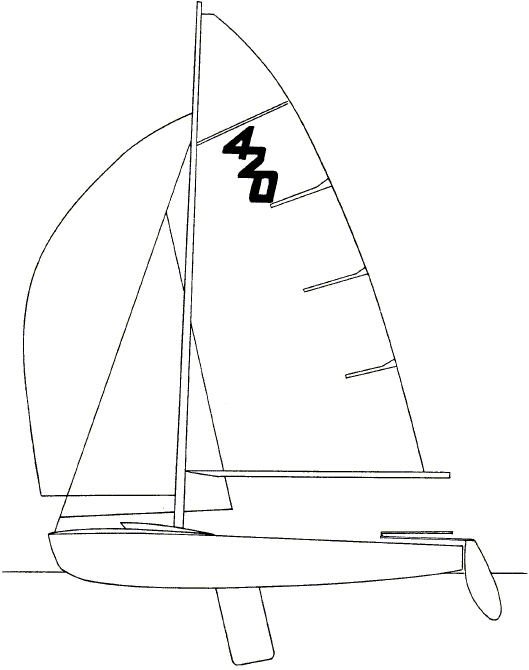

The International 420 Dinghy is a sailing dinghy popular for racing and teaching. The hull is fiberglass with internal buoyancy tanks. The 420 has a bermuda rig, spinnaker and trapeze. It has a large sail-area-to-weight ratio, and is designed to plane easily. The 420 is an International class recognised by World Sailing. The name refers to the boat's length of 420 centimetres (4.2 m; 13 ft 9 in).

== History ==
The International 420 was designed by Christian Maury in France in the year 1959. The class developed rapidly in France, being adopted nationally as a youth trainer for the larger Olympic class International 470. By the late 1960s the class was adopted by a few UK university sailing clubs for training and team racing.

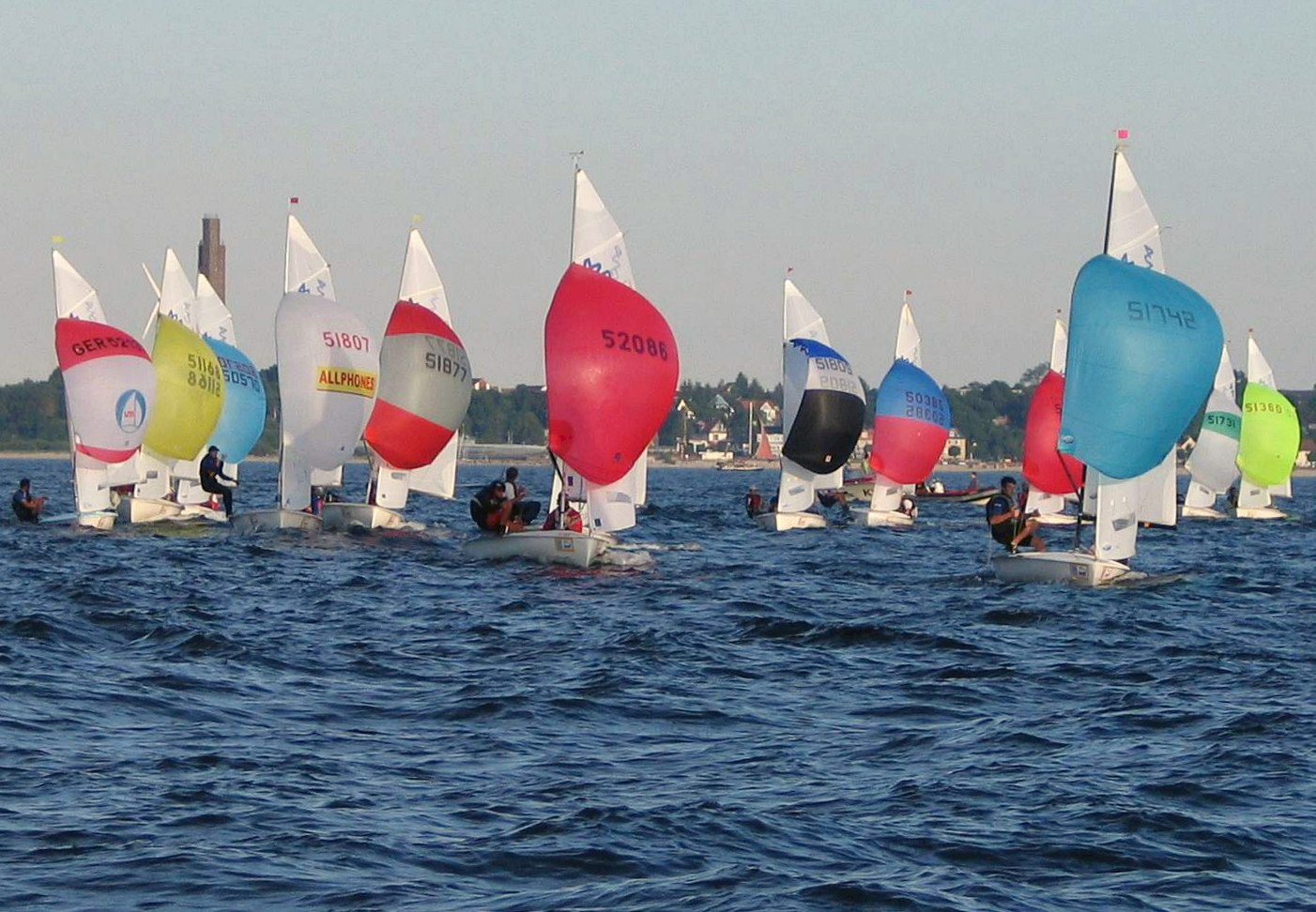

=== Construction ===
The class adopted a policy of "prudent evolution" so as to allow development without making existing dinghies obsolete. The hull's seaworthiness and stability at speed proved to be better than most of its contemporaries, and this together with its modest sail area make it fun to sail in heavy weather and thus an excellent youth trainer, qualities that led to its adoption for that role by the Royal Yachting Association in the mid-1970s. In addition, the international 420 is known for its inherent lightness. The floatability of the boat made for a safer training vessel.

With its trapeze and spinnaker it provides the capability for sailing techniques for international standard sailors, while still remaining affordable and accessible to beginners. The International 420 maintains a multinational class association. The combination of class management, the boat's sailing qualities, and evolution have contributed to the class's continuing success.

== Derivatives C420 and Z420 ==
The Club 420, or C420, was derived from the 420 by Vanguard boats in the 1970s. It is not recognized by World Sailing or the International 420 Class Association and cannot be used at I420 class events.

It is much simpler to sail and is used on the youth race circuit in the US, with over 5,000 boats in North America, but is not sailed in most other countries.

With a heavier hull, reinforced for durability in institutional sailing, and a stiff, untapered mast it lacks the performance of the original dinghy due to its extra weight.

The Z420 is a transformation of the Club 420. Its hull is 50 pounds (23 kg) lighter and 40 percent stiffer than the C420. Whereas a C420 hull is composed of six pieces, the Z420 has only three molded components: the hull, the deck, and the mast partners. Unlike the C420, the Z420 does not include a spinnaker or trapeze in its rigging. Z420 boats are specially designed for college sailing and were used at the Inter-Collegiate Sailing Association National Championships in 2014 for the first time.

== 420 Events ==
=== 420 World Championships ===
Held every year since 1973 organized by the International 420 Class Association and recognised by World Sailing. Three fleets current race separately which are the Male & Mixed, Female and Open Under 17.

=== 420 Team Racing World Championship ===
The boat has been used for team racing in both the ISAF Team Racing World Championship and the ISAF World Sailing Games however the class established its own team racing competition in 2015. Only the International 14 and Optimist (dinghy) class association hold a team racing based World Championships in addition to the two discipline led events.

Year	Gold	Silver	Bronze
2015 (Italy) Lake Garda	Spain (Note: Winning team composed of María Bover, Javier González, Clara Llabrés, Marc Lladó, Antoni Massanet, and Albert Torres)	Italy	Portugal
2016 (Italy) Lake Garda	Spain (Note: Winning team composed of Julio Alonso, Elias Aretz, Marta Caba, Pilar Caba, Luis Doreste, and Helenio Hoyos)	Spain	Italy

=== IYRU Women World Championships ===
Year	Gold	Silver	Bronze
1978 (Netherlands) Monnickendam	Cathy Foster (GBR); Wendy Hilder (GBR)	Marie Chrustine Hue (FRA); Claire Lefur (FRA)	Genevieve Levaillant (FRA); Blandine Levaillant (FRA)
1978 (United States) Rochester	Cathy Foster (GBR); Wendy Hilder (GBR)	Taylor (USA); Lewis (USA)	Currey (GBR); Blake (GBR)
1980 (Denmark) Skovshoved	Christina Mazzaferro (ITA); Emanuela Galeazzi (ITA)	Anna Bacchiega (ITA); Paola Bacchiega (ITA)	Marie-Christine Hue (FRA); Claire Le Fur (FRA)
1981 (Italy) Stintino	Christina Mazzaferro (ITA); Manuela Galeazzi (ITA)	Cathy Foster (GBR); Wendy Hilder (GBR)	Anna Bacchiega (ITA); Nives Monico (ITA)
1989 (Spain) Palma	Nuria Bover (ESP); Sylvia Summer (ESP)	Giorgia Gaudino (ITA); Sara Gaudino (ITA)	Stephanie Pornin (FRA); Rouan (FRA)

=== World Sailing – Youth Sailing World Championships ===
The class has been used extensively at the Youth Sailing World Championships which run by World Sailing this is different to the Class Worlds by way that equipment is supplied and entries are limited to one entry per nations but often from more nations.

== Club 420 Events ==
=== Club 420 North American Championship ===
Year	Gold	Silver	Bronze
2018; New Bedford Community Sailing, MA	Luke Arnone; Noble Renyoso	Jack Murphy; Tommy Szymanski	
2017; Buffalo Canoe Club, ON	Maddie Hawkins; Kimberly Leonard	Sarah Burn; Patricia Gerli	
2016; Cabrillo Beach YC, CA	Cole Harris; Tanner Chapko	Luke Arnone; Mariner Fagan	
2015; Sail NC, NC	Henry Burnes; Peter Barron	Eduardo Mintzias; Katie Lounsbury	
2014 Brant Beach Yacht Club, NJ	Martina Sly; Ian Morgan	Nick Hernandez; Zack Jordan	
2013 St. Margaret Sailing Club, NS, CAN	Charlie Lomax; Evan Morgan	Nicholas Sertl; Elizabeth Pemberton	
2012 Falmouth Yacht Club, MA	Bradley Adam; Charles MacBain	Max Simmons; Riley Legault	
2011; Buffalo Canoe Club, ON, CAN	Malcolm Lamphere; Riley Legault	Alex Curtiss; Jackie Capellini	
2010; Brant Beach Yacht Club, NJ	Pearson Potts; Caitlin Connerney	Graham Landy; Colin Murphy	
2009; Macatawa Bay Yacht Club, MI	Taylor Canfield; Stephanie Roble	Marlena Fauer; Christina Lewis	
2008; Chautauqua Lake Yacht Club, NY	Stephanie Hudson; Laura McKenna	Louis Padnos; Ben Spector	
2007; Alamitos Bay Yacht Club, CA	Adam Roberts; Nick Martin	Taylor Canfield; Perry Emsiek	
2006; Bellport Bay Yacht Club, NY	Taylor Canfield; Nate Rosenberg	Molly Lucas; Charlotte Williams	
2005; Beverly Yacht Club, MA	Tyler Sinks; Ben Totder	Steven Barbano; Dan Liberty	
2004 St. Thomas Yacht Club, USVI	TJ Tullo; Niki Kennedy	John Kempton; Molly Lucas	
2003 Portsmouth Olympic Harbour, ON, CAN	Leight Kempton; Kaity Storck	Chris Behm; Meg Callahan	
2002 Wayzata Yacht Club, MN	TJ Tullo; John Sampson	Lee Sackett; Mandy Sackett	
2001	Marc Sorbo; Ryan Heaney	John Howell; Nick Nelson	
2000 Barrington Yacht Club, RI	Kerry Logue; Liz McCarthy	Allison Robin; Rebecca Doane	
1999 Plymouth Yacht Club, MA	Erin Maxwell; Leslie Sandberg	Peter Deming; Cameron Williams	
1998	Maxwell Manning; Ashley Lang		
1997 Bristol, RI	Peter Levesque; Nicole Ernst	John Mollicone; Heather Tow-Yick	
1996 (Scituate Harbor YC)	Mike Richards; Leah Williams; Falmouth YC		
1995 (Plymouth YC)	Tim Fallon; Martha Carleton; Wild Harbor YC		
1994 (Portland YC)	Tim Fallon; Martha Carleton; Wild Harbor YC		
1993 (Wianno YC)	Andrew Buttner; Laura Stearns of Plymouth YC		
1992 (Hyannis YC)	Robbie Richards & Margaret Gill of Falmouth YC		

=== Club 420 US National Championship ===
Year	Gold	Silver	Bronze
2018; Brant Beach YC, NJ	Ansgar Jordan; Patrick Mulcahy	Luke Arnone; Noble Reynoso	
2017; Wianno Yacht Club, MA	Tucker Weed; Olivia de Olazarra	Boyd Bragg; Aisling Sullivan	
2016; Falmouth YC, MA	Nicholas Marwell; Aidan Morgan	Kyle Dochoda; George Sidamon-Eristoff	
2015; Sail Newport, Newport, RI	Stephanie Houck; Camille White	Timothy Greehouse; Jack DeNatale	
2014; San Diego YC, CA	Scott Sinks; Rebecca McElvain	Max Brill; Ian Brill	
2013 Lake Geneva YC, WI	Carter Cameron; Ian Dilling	Mary Claire Kiernan; Lucy Wilmont	
2012; California YC, CA	Will La Dow; Nikki Obel	Jack Jorgensen; Savanna Willard	
2011 Sheridan Shores SS, IL	Chuckie Eaton; Trevor Hecht	Ben Herman; Mason Ryan	
2010 California YC, CA	Kieran Chung; Ryan Davidson	Jack Ortel; Kelly Ortel	
2009 Conanicut & Jamestown YC, RI	Nick Johnstone; Katia DaSilva	Marcus Edegran; Teddy Mark	
2008 Stanford SC, CA	Tyler Sinks; Miles Gutenkunst	Louis Padnos; Ben Spector	
2007 Wazayta SS, MN	Sam Williams; Margaret Rew	Sydney Bolger; Kayla McComb	
2006	No Event		
2005	No Event		
2004	No Event		
2003 Youngstown YC, NY	Martin Sterling; Sean Doyle	Charlie Modica; Patrick Bordner	
2002 Youngstown YC, NY	Lauren Padilla; Robbie Ginnebau	TJ Tullo; John Sampson	
2001 No Event			
2000 Grosse Point YC, MI	Nathan Hollerbech; Carrie Howe	Lauren Padilla; Ellen Padilla	
