= Ariadne Spanaki =

Greek sailor

Personal information
- Full name: Ariadne Paraskevi Spanaki
- Nationality: Greek
- Born: 13 March 2001 (age 24); Thessaloniki, Greece

Sport
- Sport: Sailing
- Club: Piraeus Nautical Club

Ariadne Paraskevi Spanaki (born 13 March 2001) is a Greek sailor. She competed with Emilia Tsoulfa in the women's 470 event at the 2020 Summer Olympics.
