= Xavier Antich =

Catalan university teacher

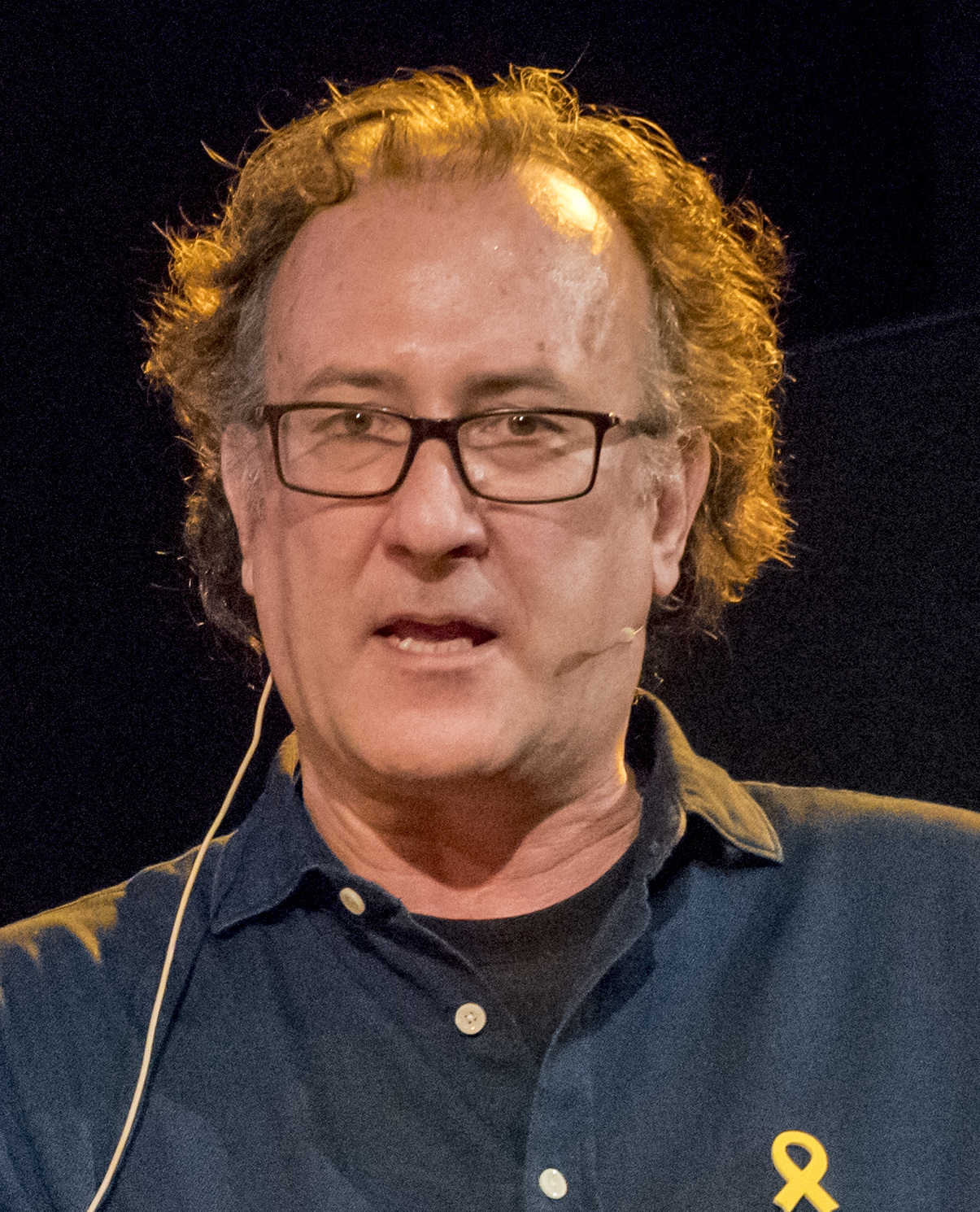
- Born: Xavier Antich i Valero; 1962; La Seu d'Urgell, Catalonia, Spain
- Occupation(s): university teacher and philosopher
- Known for: President of Òmnium Cultural

Xavier Antich i Valero (La Seu d'Urgell, 1962) is a Catalan philosopher, writer, and university professor in Catalonia. He is a professor of aesthetics at the University of Girona. He chaired the board of the Tàpies Foundation between 2011 and 2022. Since February 2022, he has been the President of Catalan Civil Association Òmnium Cultural.

== Biography ==
Born in La Seu d’Urgell, son of a bookseller and a teacher. He received the Extraordinary Degree Award in (1985) and earned a PhD in philosophy from the University of Barcelona, with a doctoral thesis on the Metaphysics of Aristotle in (1997). He works as Professor of History of Aesthetic Ideas and Art Theory at the University of Girona. He has been a visiting chair at Stanford University and a visiting professor at The Universidade Católica Portuguesa. From 2011 to 2022, he chaired the board of the Tàpies Foundation. On February 26, 2022, he was appointed President of Òmnium Cultural, a non-profit cultural organisation founded in 1961 with more than 190,000 members and 52 local branches in Catalonia.

== Works ==
- Introducción a la metafísica de Aristóteles. El problema del objeto en la filosofía primera. Barcelona: PPU (1990). ISBN 84-7665-621-1
- El rostre de l'altre. Passeig filosòfic per l'obra d'Emmanuel Lévinas. València: Eliseu Climent Editor (Premi Joan Fuster d'assaig) (1993). ISBN 9788475023748.
- L'umanesimo di Lévinas e l'incontro a Davos, Idee (1994) pp. 91–96
- Antoni Tàpies. Certeses sentides. Cracòvia: Kraków National Museum, Instituto Cervantes
- Barcelona, 1917-1928. Del 391 al Manifest Groc, dins: AAVV, Capitales del arte moderno. Madrid: Instituto de Cultura, Fundación Mapfre (2007).
- Ver para mirar. De la imagen-control a la imagen-deseo, dins: AAVV, Cuerpo y mirada. Huellas del siglo XX. Madrid: Museo Nacional Centro de Arte Reina Sofía (2007).
- Per què necessitem les humanitats? Conviure amb els clàssics per viure el present. Barcelona: ESADE / CEJP (2013).
- La ciutat del dissens. Espai comú i pluralitat. Barcelona: CCCB (2013).
- La voluntat de comprendre. Barcelona: Arcàdia (2016)
- Dos assaigs sobre fotografia (Arcàdia i Gg, 2019)
