= Hayling Island Sailing Club =

The old club house. Now replaced.

Hayling Island Sailing Club, is a sailing club founded in 1921. The first clubhouse was originally a fisherman's cottage adjacent to Salterns Quay, and known as Quay Cottage. After a short while, the club moved into the premises now occupied by the Mengham Rythe Sailing Club.

The "old" club house was built in 1936 when the club moved to its present site, a unique position on the southern shores of Chichester Harbour, on the bulbous tip of a narrow peninsula, known as Sandy Point. Here it dominates the harbour entrance and provides immediate access either to the open sea or to the expansive, land-locked waters of the harbour. Sailing is possible at all stages of the tide and times of year.

The first Regatta was held in 1922, with a number of entries from Bosham, Emsworth, Langstone, Itchenor and Portsmouth. In addition to sailing, the Regatta programme of 1922 included rowing and swimming races, pillow fights on a pole slung between two barges, and concluded with a mud-patten race.

As a result of this, about 120 members were enrolled at an annual subscription of 1 guinea, and enjoyed handicap racing with a varied collection of boats. However, the desire for a one-design led to the introduction of a Hayling Island Class boat costing some £50 fully equipped. These were 16 ft. clinker built, centreboard craft, three-quarter decked, with sliding gunter rig. They were not particularly fast but were sea worthy in all conditions.

Until 2001 the Clubhouse was a two-storey brick building, built in a cruciform shape, and designed by the late Captain Ivan Snell, MC. With a large restaurant and bars on the first floor, together with a balcony.

With a lottery grant awarded to the club, in recognition of becoming the RYA's Centre of Excellence on the South Coast, redevelopment of a new Clubhouse was completed early in 2003, which was inaugurated by The Princess Royal.

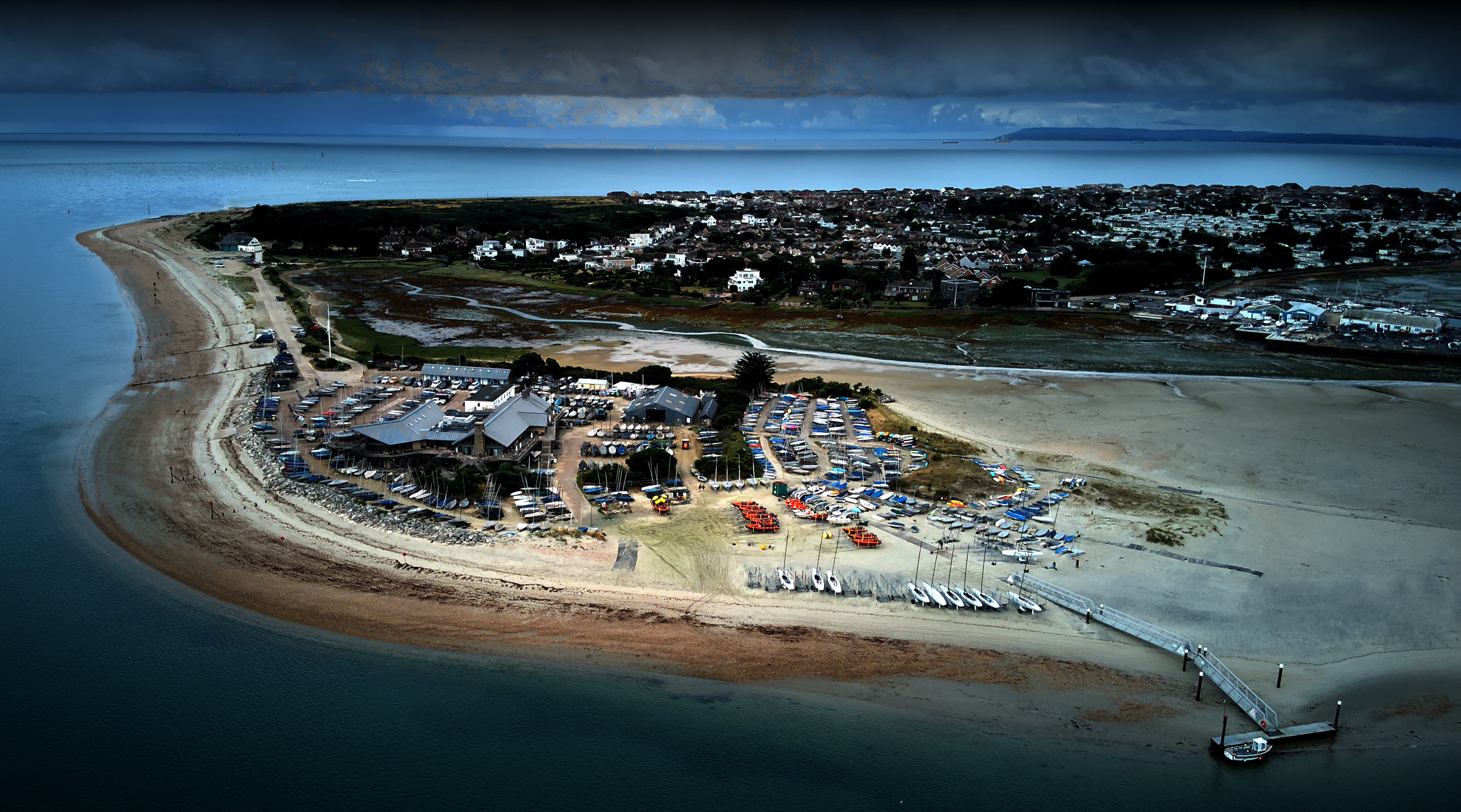
Hayling Island Sailing Club

The Club runs training programmes covering; powerboat handling, radio operation, first aid, race officer requirements and youth sail training.

Every weekend during the main sailing season the Club holds points races for a range of dinghy, keelboat and cruiser classes, and combines with the other clubs in the harbour in the organising of Regattas and Chichester Harbour Race Week (Fed Week). Open winter and spring series are run for the dinghy and cruiser classes.

== See also ==
- Hayling Island
