= 1995 470 European Championships =

1995 European sailing championship

The 1995 470-European-Sailing-Championship was held between June 8 and 17 1995. It was discharged before Bastad, Sweden.

And was extended in both a women's and a men's competition 470-boat class, in which at the men the Britains Merricks / Walker and among women the Ukrainians Taran / Pakholchyk after twelve races the European title won.

== Results ==
=== Men ===
Place	Land	Athlete	Points
1	GBR	John Merricks / Ian Walker	81.50
2	FIN	Petri Leskinen / Mika Aarnika	84.00
3	GER	Ronald Rensch / Torsten Haverland	84.25
4	GRE	Andreas Kosmatopoulos / Kostas Trigonis	100.00
5	GER	Michael Koch / Stefan Theuerkauf	107.00
6	SWE	Claes Gregart / Martin Andersson	107.00
7	ITA	Paolo Cian / Delatorre	115.00
8	CRO	Ivan Kuret / Marko Mišura	119.00
9	POR	Hugo Rocha / Nuno Barreto	124.75
10	SWE	Bjorn Bengtsson / Johan Nystrom	125.00

=== Women ===
Place	Land	Athlete	Points
1	UKR	Ruslana Taran / Olena Pakholchyk	40.75
2	GER	Ines Bohn / Sabine Rohatzsch	77.75
3	ESP	Laura Leon / Viviane Mainemare	81.00
4	GBR	Bethan Raggatt / Sue Carr	82.00
5	GER	Tanja Stemmler / Susanne Bergmann	89.50
6	ITA	Federica Salvà / Emanuela Sossi	94.75
7	ESP	Theresa Zabell / Begonia Dufresne	96.50
8	GER	Nicola Birkner / Wibke Bülle	98.75
9	GER	Anette Patrunky / Pilz	112.00
10	GER	Susanne Peters / Konarski	125.00
