= 2006 ISAF World Sailing Games =

Event details
- Venue: Lake Neusiedl, Austria
- Dates: 10–20 May
- Yachts: 420, 470, 49er, Hobie 16, Hobie Tiger, Laser, Laser Radial, RS:X
- Titles: 10

The 2006 ISAF World Sailing Games was held at Lake Neusiedl, Austria 10–20 May.

The events were 420 team racing, 470 (men and women), 49er, women's Hobie 16, Hobie Tiger, men's Laser, women's Laser Radial, and RS:X (men and women). In the 2006 event, sailors from similar classes were invited to participate, e.g. the medalists from 2005 Finn Gold Cup and the world champions in Byte, Contender, and OK were invited to the men's one-person dinghy event in Laser.

== Competition format ==
=== Events and equipment ===
Of each countries entries, two were initially accepted: the first entry from the country and the entry that was best-ranked on the most recent ISAF World Sailing Rankings for the corresponding Olympic event. Additionally, the organising committee could accept the second-fastest entry per country if the quota of the event was not yet reached. Champions and medalists of the latest World championships could enter outside the national restrictions as listed below. Also top-ten of the 15 February 2006 ISAF World Sailing Rankings and current World champions in Olympic classes (except Yngling, Finn and Star), as well as top-four of the 2005 Team Sailing World Championships were qualified.

Event	Equipment	Max. entries	Invited medalists or champions
Men's one-person dinghy	Laser	100	Finn (3), Byte (1), Contender (1), OK (1)
Men's two-person dinghy	470	80	420 (1), 505 (1), Flying Dutchman (1)
Men's multihull	Hobie Tiger	60	A-Catamaran (1), Dart 18 (1), Formula 18 (1), Hobie 16 (1), Hobie Tiger (1)
Men's windsurfer	RS:X	80	
Women's one-person dinghy	Laser Radial	80	Europe (1)
Women's two-person dinghy	470	50	
Women's multihull	Hobie 16	40	Hobie 16 (women) (3)
Women's windsurfer	RS:X	60	
Open skiff	49er	50	
Team sailing	420		

=== Invited sailors ===
Criteria	Men				Women				Open	
Criteria	Laser	470	Hobie Tiger (Note: Tornado as the Olympic class)	RS:X	Laser Radial	470	Hobie 16	RS:X	49er	Team
ISAF World Sailing Rankings top ten	(Brazil) Robert Scheidt (United Kingdom) Paul Goodison (Austria) Andreas Geritzer (Slovenia) Vasilij Žbogar (Croatia) Mate Arapov (Portugal) Gustavo Lima (France) Félix Pruvot (Australia) Tom Slingsby (Canada) Bernard Luttmer (Chile) Matías del Solar	(Israel) Gideon Kliger (Portugal) Álvaro Marinho (France) Benjamin Bonnaud (Italy) Gabrio Zandonà (Netherlands) Sven Coster (United Kingdom) Nic Asher (United Kingdom) Nick Rogers (Russia) Dmitri Berezkin (Republic of Ireland) Ger Owens (Australia) Matthias Schmid			(United States) Paige Railey (Australia) Laura Baldwin (Australia) Krystal Weir (United States) Anna Tobias (Canada) Lisa Ross (United Kingdom) Elizabeth Vickers (Republic of Ireland) Andrea Brewster (Canada) Jennifer Spalding (France) Solenne Brain (Canada) Keamia Rasa	(France) Ingrid Petitjean (United Kingdom) Christina Bassadone (Austria) Sylvia Vogl (Netherlands) Marcelien de Koning (Israel) Nike Kornecki (Sweden) Therese Torgersson (Spain) Natalia Vía Dufresne (United Kingdom) Pippa Wilson (Canada) Jennifer Provan (Argentina) María Fernanda Sesto	—N/a			—N/a
Class WC winners	(Brazil) Robert Scheidt	(Australia) Wilmot & Page	(Spain) Echávarri & Paz	(France) Nicolas Huguet	(United States) Paige Railey	(Netherlands) de Koning & Berkhout	—N/a	(Spain) Blanca Manchón	(Ukraine) Luka & Leonchuk	(United States) USA 1 (United States) USA 2 (United Kingdom) Great Britain 1 (United Kingdom) Great Britain 2
Other WC winners	(United Kingdom) Ben Ainslie (Greece) Aimilios Papathanasiou (Canada) Chris Cook; Byte champion (Germany) Jan von der Bank (United Kingdom) Nick Craig	420 champions 505 champions (Denmark) Bojsen-Møller & Bojsen-Møller	A-Catamaran champions Dart 18 champions Formula 18 champions Hobie 16 champions Hobie Tiger champions	—N/a	Europe champion	—N/a	Hobie 16 (women) 1 Hobie 16 (women) 2 Hobie 16 (women) 3	—N/a	—N/a	—N/a

== Summary ==
=== Medal table ===
Rank	Nation	Gold	Silver	Bronze	Total
1	Australia (AUS)	3	2	1	6
2	United States (USA)	2	0	2	4
3	France (FRA)	1	4	1	6
4	Ukraine (UKR)	1	2	1	4
5	Spain (ESP)	1	0	2	3
6	China (CHN)	1	0	0	1
6	Germany (GER)	1	0	0	1
8	Netherlands (NED)	0	1	1	2
9	Great Britain (GBR)	0	1	0	1
10	Argentina (ARG)	0	0	1	1
10	Italy (ITA)	0	0	1	1
Totals (11 entries)		10	10	10	30

=== Event medalists ===
Event	Gold	Silver	Bronze
420 (team racing)	United States; Danny Pletsch; Carolyn Howe; Caleb Silsby; Paige Silsby	Great Britain; Rob Sherrington; Linda Eadie; Steve Tylecote; Debs Kershaw	United States; Tim Wadlow; Ery Largary; Timothy Fallon; Karen Renzulli
Men's 470	Australia; Nathan Wilmot; Malcolm Page	France; Benjamin Bonnaud; Romain Bonnaud	Spain; Kiko Sánchez; Alejandro Ramos
Women's 470	France; Ingrid Petitjean; Nadège Douroux	Australia; Elise Rechichi; Tessa Parkinson	Ukraine; Ruslana Taran; Olena Pakholchyk
49er	Spain; Iker Martínez de Lizarduy; Xabier Fernández	Ukraine; Rodion Luka; George Leonchuk	Italy; Pietro Sibello; Gianfranco Sibello
Hobie 16	Germany; Kerstin Wichardt; Anja Hafke	France; Marie Duvignac; Pauline Thevenot	United States; Annie Gardner; Susan Korzeniewski
Hobie Tiger	Australia; Darren Bundock; Glenn Ashby	Netherlands; Mitch Booth; Herbert Dercksen	Netherlands; Coen de Koning; Mischa Heemskerk
Laser	Tom Slingsby (AUS)	Thomas Le Breton (FRA)	Diego Romero (ARG)
Laser Radial	Paige Railey (USA)	Sophie de Turckheim (FRA)	Sarah Blanck (AUS)
Men's RS:X	Max Oberemko (UKR)	Tom Ashley (NZL)	Julien Bontemps (FRA)
Women's RS:X	Chen Qiubin (CHN)	Olga Maslivets (UKR)	Blanca Manchón (ESP)
