= 2002 ISAF World Sailing Games =

Event title
- Edition: 3rd

Event details
- Venue: Marseille, France
- Dates: 29 June – 10 July
- Yachts: 470, Hobie 16, J/22, J/80, Laser, Laser Radial, Techno 293
- Titles: 10

The 2002 ISAF World Sailing Games was held in Marseille, France, 29 June – 10 July.

The selected classes were 470 (men and women), Hobie 16 (open and women), women's J/22, J/80, men's Laser, women's Laser Radial, Techno 293 (open and women). Each country were allowed to entry two sailors per event, with addition to the ISAF rankings leaders in Olympic classes, winners of the preceding 1998 games and winners of the 2000 Olympics.

== Competition format ==
=== Events and equipment ===
Each country were allowed to entry two sailors per event, with addition to the ISAF rankings leaders in Olympic classes (end of April 2002), winners of the preceding 1998 games and winners of the 2000 Olympics.

Event	Equipment	Max. entries
Men's one-person dinghy	Laser	
Men's two-person dinghy	470	
Men's keelboat	J/80	
Men's and mixed multihull	Hobie 16	
Men's sailboard	Techno 293	
Women's one-person dinghy	Laser Radial	
Women's two-person dinghy	470	
Women's keelboat	J/22	
Women's multihull	Hobie 16	
Women's sailboard	Techno 293	

=== Invited sailors ===
Criteria	Men					Women				
Criteria	Laser	470	J/80	Hobie 16 (Note: Tornado as the Olympic class)	Techno 293 (Note: Mistral as the Olympic class)	Laser Radial	470	J/22	Hobie 16	Techno 293
ISAF World Sailing Rankings leader			—N/a	—N/a		—N/a		—N/a	—N/a	
2000 Olympic champions	(United Kingdom) Ben Ainslie (United Kingdom) Iain Percy (Note: won Finn)	(Australia) Tom King (Finland) Thomas Johanson (Note: won 49er)	(United States) Mark Reynolds (Note: won Star) (Denmark) Jesper Bank (Note: won Soling)	(Austria) Roman Hagara	(Austria) Christoph Sieber	(United Kingdom) Shirley Robertson (Note: won Europe)	(Australia) Jenny Armstrong	—N/a	—N/a	(Italy) Alessandra Sensini
1998 World Games champions	(United Kingdom) Ben Ainslie	(Finland) Leskinen & Heinila	(France) Brenac, Cunningham, Dubreucq & Moner	(South Africa) Ferry & Lewis	—N/a	(Denmark) Kristine Roug	(Ukraine) Taran & Pakholchyk	(Denmark) Jensen, Jespersen, Kiel Nielsen & Strøm	(South Africa) Schabort & Anley	—N/a

== Summary ==
=== Medal table ===
* Host nation (France)

Rank	Nation	Gold	Silver	Bronze	Total
1	France (FRA)*	4	4	1	9
2	Australia (AUS)	2	1	1	4
2	Italy (ITA)	2	1	1	4
4	Brazil (BRA)	1	1	0	2
5	Israel (ISR)	1	0	0	1
6	Austria (AUT)	0	1	0	1
6	New Zealand (NZL)	0	1	0	1
6	Poland (POL)	0	1	0	1
9	Spain (ESP)	0	0	2	2
10	Croatia (CRO)	0	0	1	1
10	Great Britain (GBR)	0	0	1	1
10	Greece (GRE)	0	0	1	1
10	Puerto Rico (PUR)	0	0	1	1
10	United States (USA)	0	0	1	1
Totals (14 entries)		10	10	10	30

=== Event medalists ===
Event	Gold	Silver	Bronze
Men's 470	Israel; Yogev Yosef; Shahaf Amir	France; Benjamin Bonnaud; Romain Bonnaud	Spain; Gustavo Martínez; Tunte Cantero
Women's 470	Australia; Jenny Armstrong; Belinda Stowell	France; Ingrid Petitjean; Nadège Douroux	Spain; Natalia Vía Dufresne; Sandra Azón
Open Hobie Cat	Australia; Darren Bundock; Mark Padgett	Australia; Gavin Colby; Simone Mattfield	Puerto Rico; Enrique Figueroa; Carla Malatrasi
Women's Hobie Cat	France; Marie Duvignac; Claire Japhet	France; Florence Delory; Laurian Le Gac	United States; Susan Korzeniewski; Stephanie O'Connor
J/22	France; Christine Briand; Eloid Bour; Pascale Dentraygues; Claire Pruvot	New Zealand; Karleen Dixon; Roberts; Jenny Egnot; Felicity Lind-Mithcell	Australia; Susan Walters; Karyn Gojnich; Caroline Brisbois; Heidi Gordon
J/80	France; François Brenac; Erik Ferran; Xavier Rohart; Thierry Fouchier	Italy; Gianni Sommariva; Bruno Broccanello; Luca Mungo unknown	Great Britain; Paul Brotherton; Magnus Leask; Simon Russel; Simon Near
Laser	Robert Scheidt (BRA)	Andreas Geritzer (AUT)	Evangelos Chimonas (GRE)
Laser Radial	Sophie de Turckheim (FRA)	Katarzyna Szotyńska (POL)	Gea Barbie (CRO)
Men's Techno 293	Andrea Cucchi (ITA)	Wilhelm Schurmann (BRA)	Alberto Menegatti (ITA)
Women's Techno 293	Alessandra Sensini (ITA)	Lise Vidal (FRA)	Eugenie Raffin (FRA)
