= Sailing at the 1996 Summer Olympics – Men's 470 =

470 Men's at the Games of the XXVI Olympiad
- 470
- Venue: Savannah
- Dates: 24 July to 1 August
- Competitors: 72 from 36 nations
- Teams: 36

Medalists
1st place, gold medalist(s)		Yevhen Braslavets; Ihor Matviyenko	Ukraine
2nd place, silver medalist(s)		John Merricks; Ian Walker	Great Britain
3rd place, bronze medalist(s)		Hugo Rocha; Nuno Barreto	Portugal

The Men's 470 Class Competition was a sailing event on the program at the 1996 Summer Olympics that was held from 24 July to 1 August 1996 in Savannah, Georgia, United States. Points were awarded based on placement in each race. Eleven races were scheduled and sailed. Each team had two discards, meaning each team was allowed to discard their two worst results.

== Results ==
Rank	Helmsman (Country)	Crew	Race I		Race II		Race II		Race IV		Race V		Race VI		Race VII		Race VIII		Race IX		Race X		Race XI		Total Points	Total -1
Rank	Helmsman (Country)	Crew	Rank	Points	Rank	Points	Rank	Points	Rank	Points	Rank	Points	Rank	Points	Rank	Points	Rank	Points	Rank	Points	Rank	Points	Rank	Points	Total Points	Total -1
1st place, gold medalist(s)	Yevhen Braslavets (UKR)	Ihor Matviyenko	2	2.0	2	2.0	3	3.0	1	1.0	~~16~~	~~16.0~~	5	5.0	1	1.0	9	9.0	10	10.0	7	7.0	~~DNC~~	~~37.0~~	93.0	40.0
2nd place, silver medalist(s)	John Merricks (GBR)	Ian Walker	15	15.0	1	1.0	4	4.0	~~27~~	~~27.0~~	~~DSQ~~	~~37.0~~	4	4.0	2	2.0	6	6.0	15	15.0	2	2.0	11	11.0	124.0	60.0
3rd place, bronze medalist(s)	Hugo Rocha (POR)	Nuno Barreto	5	5.0	10	10.0	~~17~~	~~17.0~~	7	7.0	4	4.0	8	8.0	9	9.0	5	5.0	2	2.0	12	12.0	~~15~~	~~15.0~~	94.0	62.0
4	Petri Leskinen (FIN)	Mika Aarnikka	~~PMS~~	~~37.0~~	14	14.0	~~19~~	~~19.0~~	4	4.0	7	7.0	6	6.0	8	8.0	1	1.0	16	16.0	6	6.0	3	3.0	121.0	65.0
5	Dmitry Berezkin (RUS)	Yevgeniy Burmatnov	13	13.0	~~25~~	~~25.0~~	5	5.0	2	2.0	3	3.0	1	1.0	11	11.0	~~20~~	~~20.0~~	19	19.0	4	4.0	8	8.0	111.0	66.0
6	Jean-François Berthet (FRA)	Gwenaël Berthet	16	16.0	6	6.0	9	9.0	~~28~~	~~28.0~~	15	15.0	~~23~~	~~23.0~~	3	3.0	2	2.0	17	17.0	3	3.0	1	1.0	123.0	72.0
7	Martín Billoch (ARG)	Martín Rodríguez	12	12.0	~~23~~	~~23.0~~	1	1.0	~~22~~	~~22.0~~	20	20.0	3	3.0	4	4.0	12	12.0	1	1.0	8	8.0	12	12.0	118.0	73.0
8	Morgan Reeser (USA)	Kevin Burnham	20	20.0	9	9.0	6	6.0	9	9.0	1	1.0	11	11.0	~~DSQ~~	~~37.0~~	4	4.0	~~PMS~~	~~37.0~~	1	1.0	13	13.0	148.0	74.0
9	Jordi Calafat (ESP)	Kiko Sánchez	1	1.0	17	17.0	14	14.0	~~20~~	~~20.0~~	2	2.0	19	19.0	5	5.0	~~PMS~~	~~37.0~~	3	3.0	13	13.0	2	2.0	133.0	76.0
10	Tõnu Tõniste (EST)	Toomas Tõniste	7	7.0	16	16.0	8	8.0	3	3.0	19	19.0	PMS	~~37.0~~	~~30~~	~~30.0~~	3	3.0	6	6.0	15	15.0	18	18.0	162.0	95.0
11	Andreas Kosmatopoulos (GRE)	Konstantinos Trigkonis	11	11.0	~~19~~	~~19.0~~	18	18.0	13	13.0	5	5.0	2	2.0	15	15.0	18	18.0	5	5.0	10	10.0	~~24~~	~~24.0~~	140.0	97.0
12	Ronald Rensch (GER)	Torsten Haverland	~~PMS~~	~~37.0~~	8	8.0	2	2.0	10	10.0	22	22.0	9	9.0	22	22.0	11	11.0	14	14.0	~~29~~	~~29.0~~	6	6.0	170.0	104.0
13	Ivan Kuret (CRO)	Marko Mišura	3	3.0	15	15.0	15	15.0	21	21.0	11	11.0	12	12.0	~~31~~	~~31.0~~	~~22~~	~~22.0~~	9	9.0	14	14.0	16	16.0	169.0	116.0
14	Tomaž Čopi (SLO)	Mitja Margon	14	14.0	20	20.0	13	13.0	11	11.0	8	8.0	~~PMS~~	~~37.0~~	16	16.0	17	17.0	7	7.0	~~25~~	~~25.0~~	10	10.0	178.0	116.0
15	Matteo Ivaldi (ITA)	Michele Ivaldi	9	9.0	4	4.0	25	25.0	8	8.0	14	14.0	~~PMS~~	~~37.0~~	17	17.0	7	7.0	31	31.0	~~DSQ~~	~~37.0~~	5	5.0	194.0	120.0
16	Marek Chocian (POL)	Zdzisław Staniul	~~PMS~~	~~37.0~~	18	18.0	~~22~~	~~22.0~~	19	19.0	17	17.0	7	7.0	21	21.0	13	13.0	8	8.0	5	5.0	17	17.0	184.0	125.0
17	Kenji Nakamura (JPN)	Masato Takaki	~~PMS~~	~~37.0~~	3	3.0	16	16.0	~~25~~	~~25.0~~	10	10.0	13	13.0	28	28.0	14	14.0	21	21.0	16	16.0	9	9.0	192.0	127.0
18	Marcus Westerlind (SWE)	Henrik Wallin	6	6.0	7	7.0	21	21.0	5	5.0	13	13.0	~~PMS~~	~~37.0~~	6	6.0	~~PMS~~	~~37.0~~	24	24.0	24	24.0	23	23.0	203.0	129.0
19	Nir Shental (ISR)	Ran Shental	17	17.0	13	13.0	29	29.0	6	6.0	6	6.0	~~26~~	~~26.0~~	19	19.0	~~PMS~~	~~37.0~~	22	22.0	9	9.0	14	14.0	198.0	132.0
20	Paul Hannam (CAN)	Brian Storey	10	10.0	21	21.0	12	12.0	~~23~~	~~23.0~~	21	21.0	29	29.0	20	20.0	~~PMS~~	~~37.0~~	13	13.0	11	11.0	4	4.0	201.0	135.0
21	Botond Litkey (HUN)	Zsolt Nyári	4	4.0	26	26.0	~~30~~	~~30.0~~	16	16.0	12	12.0	14	14.0	10	10.0	15	15.0	18	18.0	22	22.0	~~DSQ~~	~~37.0~~	204.0	137.0
22	Rohan Cooke (NZL)	Andrew Stone	8	8.0	11	11.0	10	10.0	14	14.0	25	25.0	22	22.0	18	18.0	10	10.0	~~27~~	~~27.0~~	~~27~~	~~27.0~~	21	21.0	193.0	139.0
23	Tom King (AUS)	Owen McMahon	19	19.0	12	12.0	20	20.0	~~26~~	~~26.0~~	27	27.0	16	16.0	7	7.0	~~PMS~~	~~37.0~~	25	25.0	17	17.0	7	7.0	213.0	149.0
24	Ben Kouwenhoven (NED)	Jan Kouwenhoven	~~DNS~~	~~37.0~~	5	5.0	11	11.0	32	32.0	24	24.0	10	10.0	24	24.0	8	8.0	30	30.0	20	20.0	~~DSQ~~	~~37.0~~	238.0	164.0
25	Brady Sih (TPE)	Bryant Sih	24	24.0	~~27~~	~~27.0~~	28	28.0	12	12.0	~~35~~	~~35.0~~	15	15.0	14	14.0	24	24.0	4	4.0	26	26.0	26	26.0	235.0	172.0
26	Pedro Fernández (CUB)	Ángel Jiménez	22	22.0	29	29.0	26	26.0	17	17.0	9	9.0	27	27.0	13	13.0	19	19.0	~~PMS~~	~~37.0~~	21	21.0	~~DSQ~~	~~37.0~~	257.0	183.0
27	David Ramón (AND)	Oscar Ramón	23	23.0	~~31~~	~~31.0~~	24	24.0	~~35~~	~~35.0~~	23	23.0	17	17.0	12	12.0	26	26.0	11	11.0	28	28.0	19	19.0	249.0	183.0
28	Kim Dae-yeong (KOR)	Jung Sung-ahn	18	18.0	28	28.0	7	7.0	~~29~~	~~29.0~~	~~31~~	~~31.0~~	28	28.0	26	26.0	16	16.0	26	26.0	23	23.0	28	28.0	260.0	200.0
29	Rodrigo Amado (BRA)	Leonardo Santos	26	26.0	32	32.0	23	23.0	24	24.0	18	18.0	~~PMS~~	~~37.0~~	25	25.0	25	25.0	12	12.0	18	18.0	~~29~~	~~29.0~~	269.0	200.0
30	Chris Rast (SUI)	Jean-Pierre Ziegert	21	21.0	22	22.0	27	27.0	18	18.0	26	26.0	~~30~~	~~30.0~~	27	27.0	21	21.0	~~29~~	~~29.0~~	19	19.0	20	20.0	260.0	201.0
31	Nicolas Epiphaniou (CYP)	Peter Elton	25	25.0	24	24.0	~~33~~	~~33.0~~	15	15.0	~~32~~	~~32.0~~	24	24.0	23	23.0	23	23.0	20	20.0	32	32.0	25	25.0	276.0	211.0
32	Igor Karvaš (SVK)	Jaroslav Ferianec	28	28.0	~~36~~	~~36.0~~	31	31.0	31	31.0	29	29.0	20	20.0	~~34~~	~~34.0~~	29	29.0	23	23.0	31	31.0	32	32.0	324.0	254.0
33	Andrew Gooding (JAM)	Joseph Stockhausen	27	27.0	33	33.0	~~34~~	~~34.0~~	~~34~~	~~34.0~~	33	33.0	18	18.0	33	33.0	30	30.0	32	32.0	34	34.0	27	27.0	335.0	267.0
34	Şükrü Sanus (TUR)	Kerem Özkan	29	29.0	30	30.0	~~36~~	~~36.0~~	~~DNF~~	~~37.0~~	34	34.0	21	21.0	29	29.0	28	28.0	33	33.0	33	33.0	30	30.0	340.0	267.0
35	Siew Shaw Her (SIN)	Charles Lim	~~PMS~~	~~37.0~~	~~35~~	~~35.0~~	32	32.0	33	33.0	28	28.0	31	31.0	32	32.0	27	27.0	28	28.0	30	30.0	31	31.0	344.0	272.0
36	Chan Yuk Wah (HKG)	Andrew Service	~~PMS~~	~~37.0~~	34	34.0	~~35~~	~~35.0~~	30	30.0	30	30.0	25	25.0	35	35.0	31	31.0	34	34.0	35	35.0	22	22.0	348.0	276.0

=== Daily standings ===
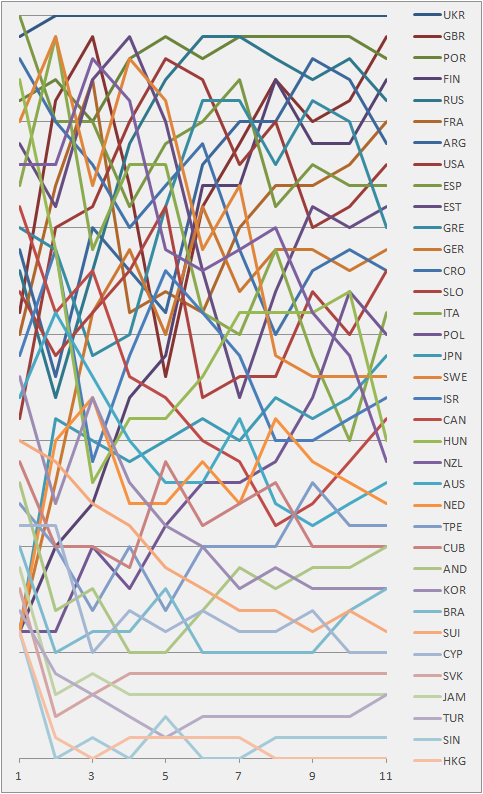
Graph showing the daily standings in the 470 Men during the 1996 Summer Olympics

== Conditions at the 470 course areas ==
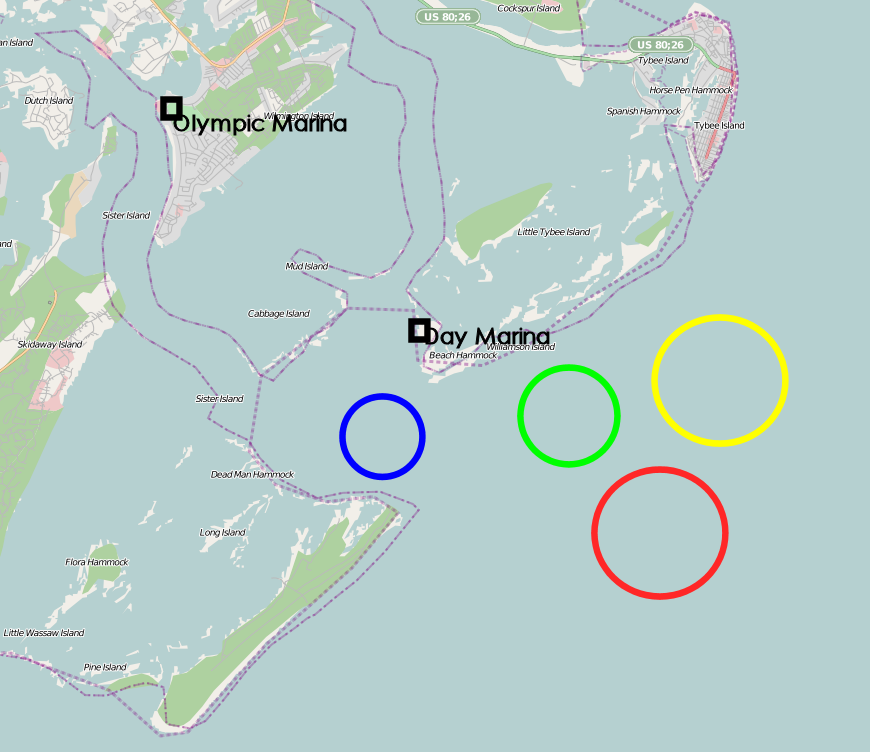
Black: Marinas
Blue: Alpha course
Green: Bravo course
Yellow: Charly course
Red: Delta course

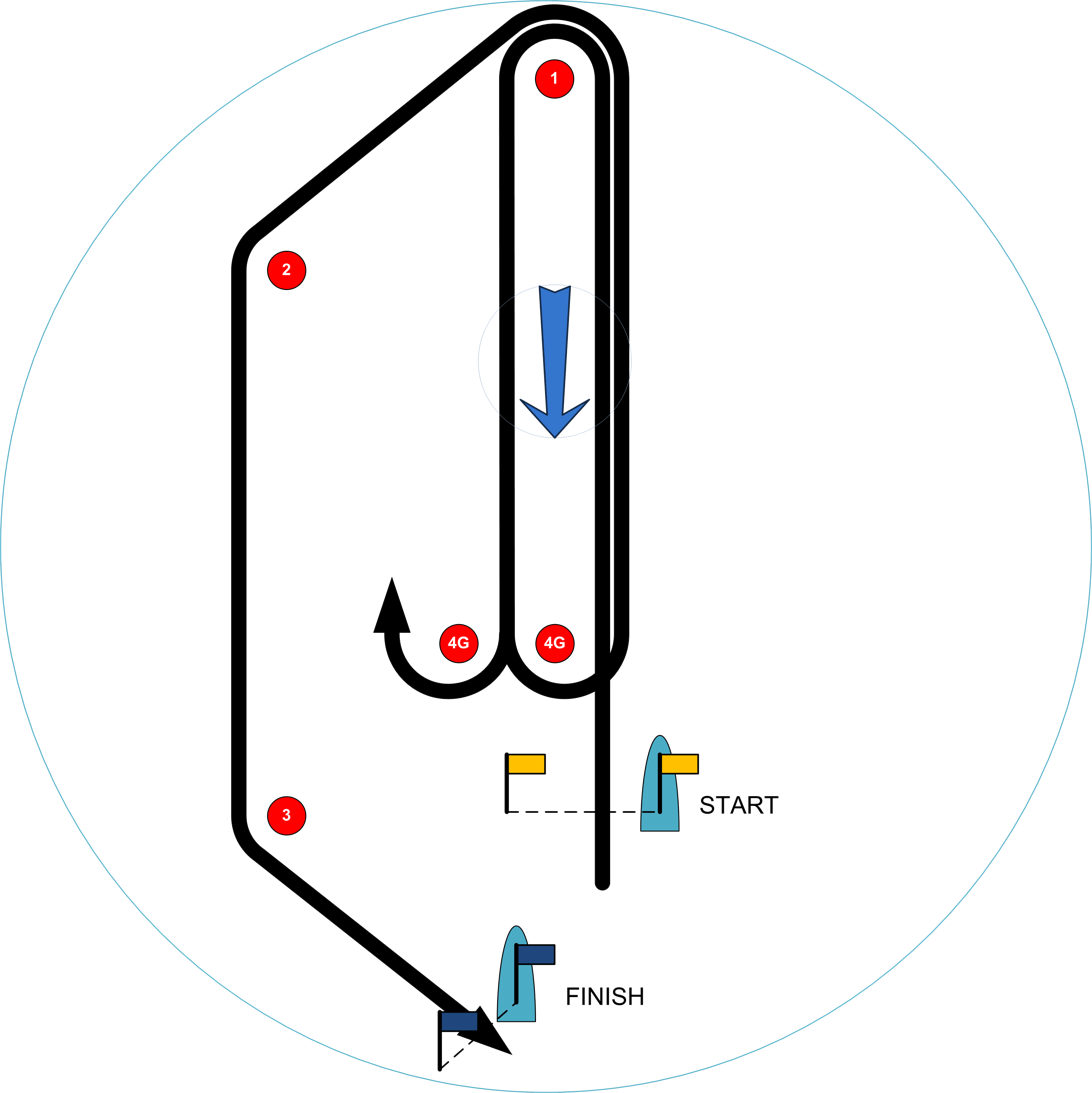
Olympic course ZI.
S(Start) - 1 - 2 - 3 - 2 - 3 - 2 - 3 - F(Finish reaching)

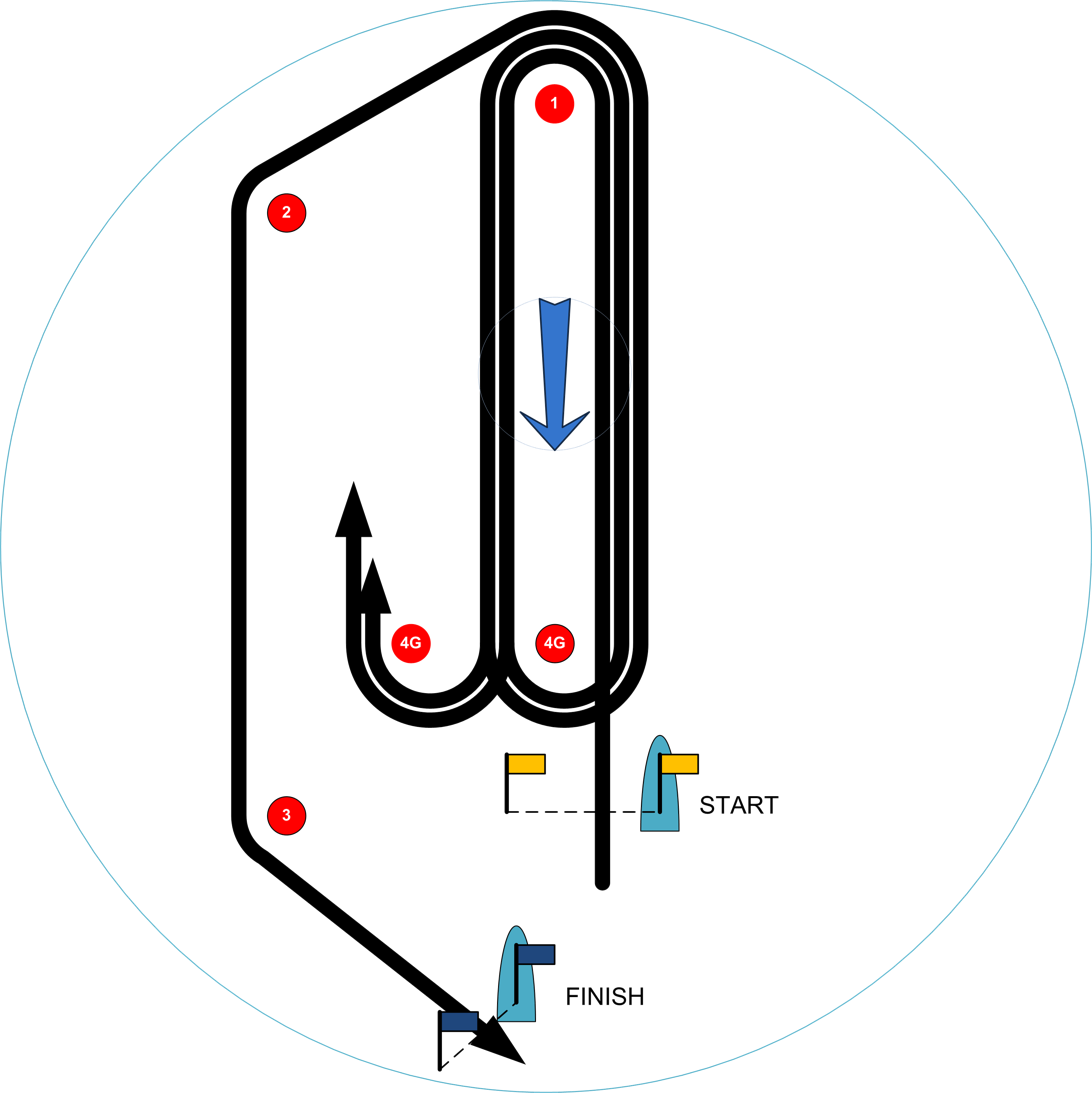
Olympic course XI.
S(Start) - 1 - 4G - 1 - 4G - 1 - 2 - 3 - F(Finish reaching)

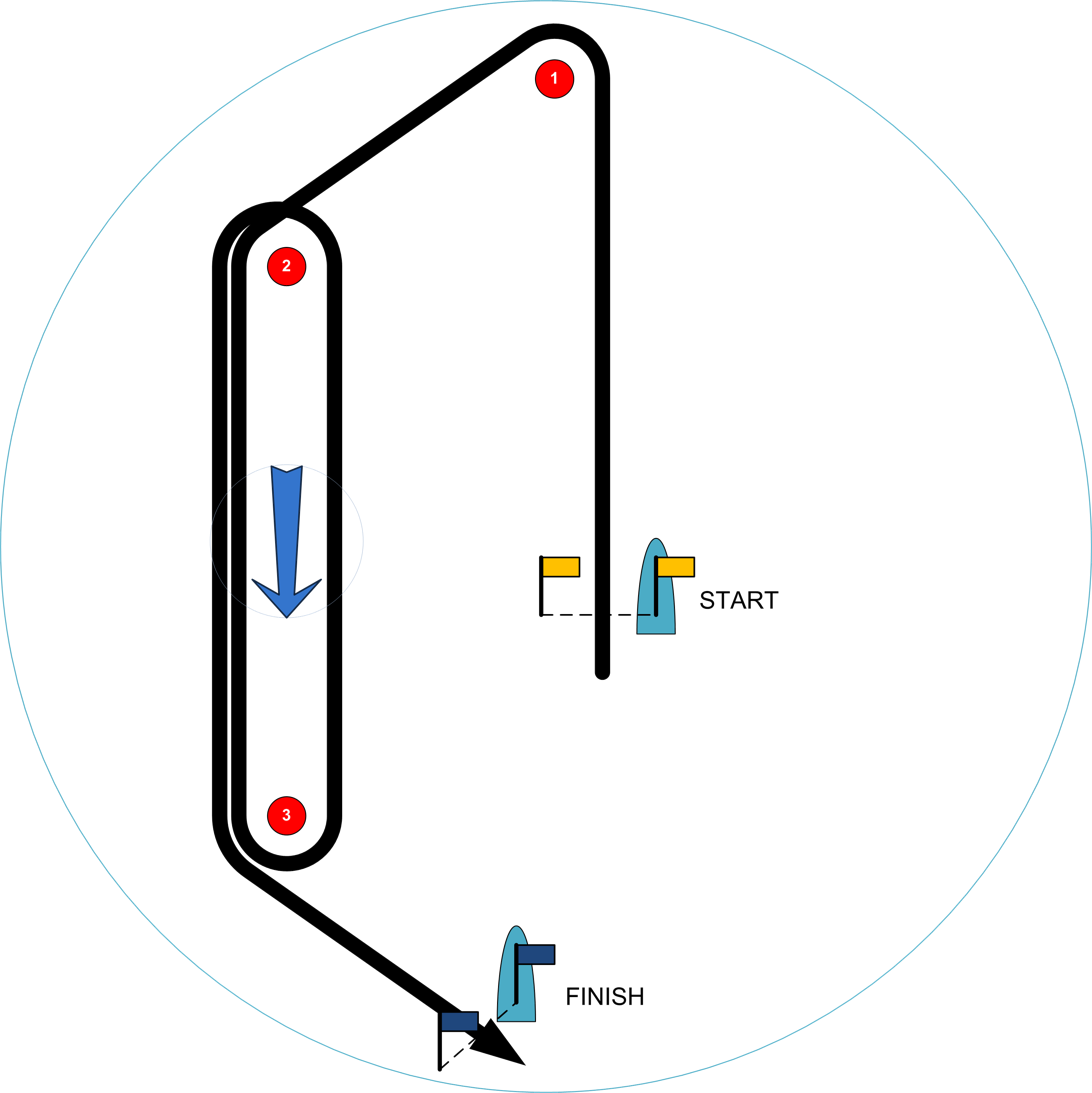
Olympic course ZO.
S(Start) - 1 - 2 - 3 - 2 - 3 - F(Finish reaching)

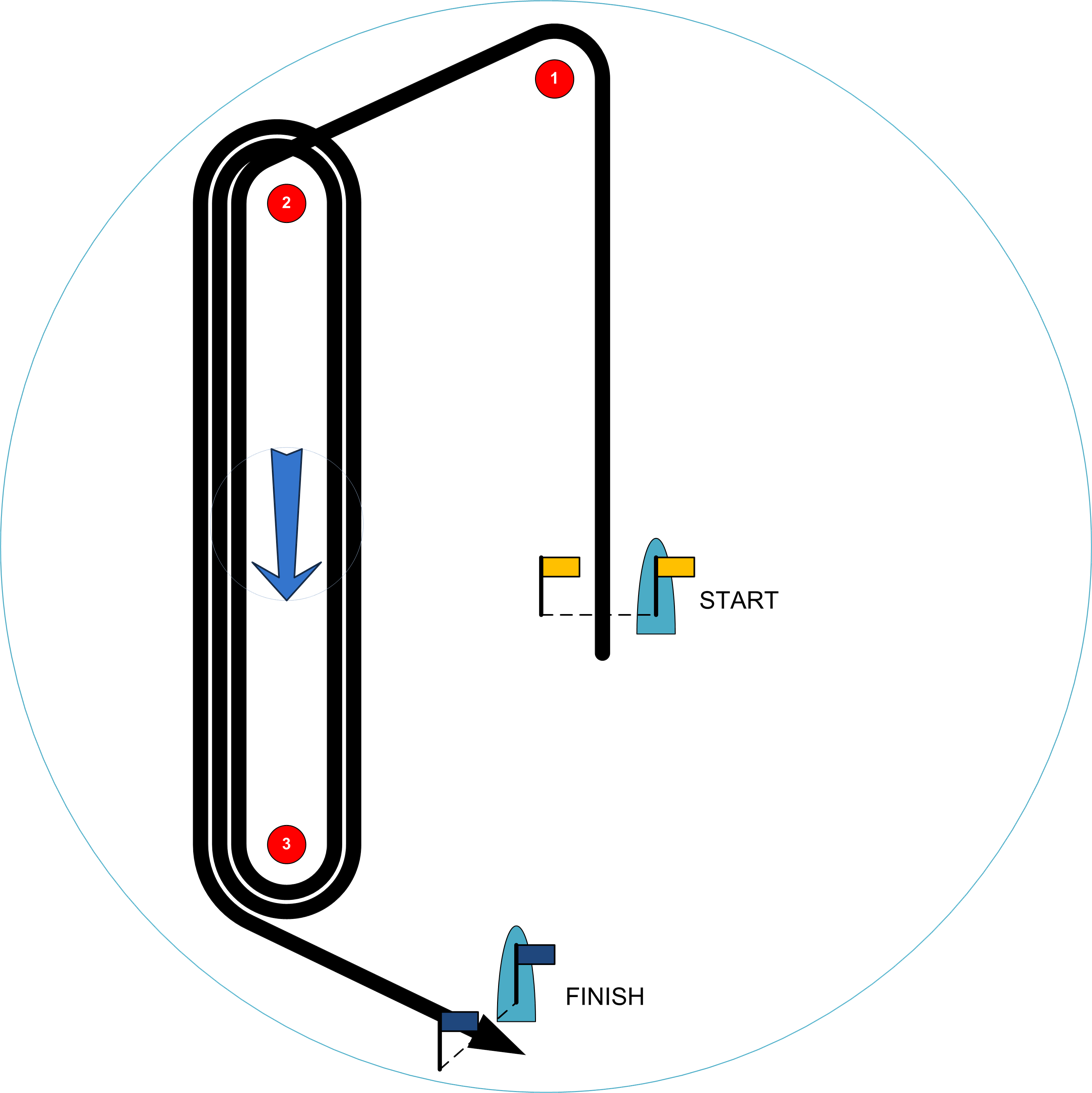
Olympic course XO.
S(Start) - 1 - 4G - 1 - 2 - 3 - F(Finish reaching)

Date	Race	°C	Knot	Meter	Course	Course area
24 July 1996	I	28	11	0.7		Charly
25 July 1996	II	29	13	0.7	XI	Charly
26 July 1996	III	28	10	0.5	ZO	Bravo
26 July 1996	IV	27	10	0.5	XO	Bravo
27 July 1996	V	28	7	0.5	ZI	Bravo
27 July 1996	VI	29	8	0.6	XI	Bravo
28 July 1996	VII	29	6	0.7	ZO	Bravo
29 July 1996	VIII	29	14	0.5	XO	Charly
30 July 1996	IX	28	8	0.4	ZI	Charly
30 July 1996	X	28	9	0.5	ZI	Charly
1 August 1996	XI	28	7	0.5	ZI	Charly
