= 1994 IYRU Youth Sailing World Championships – Laser =

Laser at the 1994 IYRU Youth Sailing World Championships
- Venue: Marathon, Greece
- Dates: 5 - 15 July 1994
- Competitors: 24 from 24 nations

Medalists
| gold medal | Dan Slater | New Zealand |
| silver medal | Ben Ainslie | Great Britain |
| bronze medal | Philipp Buchert | Germany |

The Laser competition at the 1994 IYRU Youth Sailing World Championships took place between 5 and 15 July 1994.

== Results ==
| Pos | Helm | Country | P1 | P2 | P3 | P4 | P5 | P6 | P7 | P8 | P9 | P10 | P11 | P12 | Total | Nett |
|---|---|---|---|---|---|---|---|---|---|---|---|---|---|---|---|---|
| 1 | Dan Slater | New Zealand | 1 | 2 | 3 | 3 | 1 | (6) | 1 | 1 | 6 | 3 | 5 | 4 | 36 | 30 |
| 2 | Ben Ainslie | United Kingdom | 3 | 1 | 4 | 1 | (7) | 2 | 3 | 6 | 4 | 2 | 3 | 1 | 37 | 30 |
| 3 | Philipp Buchert | Germany | 2 | (16) | 5 | 2 | 2 | 5 | 7 | 5 | 5 | 1 | 8 | 15 | 73 | 57 |
| 4 | Tamas Eszes | Hungary | 11 | 5 | 7 | 6 | 4 | 4 | (13) | 13 | 1 | 4 | 1 | 7 | 76 | 63 |
| 5 | Jan-Willem Harwijne | Netherlands | 4 | (17) | 17 | 9 | 3 | 9 | 10 | 4 | 10 | 8 | 7 | 10 | 108 | 91 |
| 6 | Brendan Casey | Australia | 5 | 7 | (28) | 4 | 5 | 16 | 2 | 18 | 21 | 11 | 6 | 3 | 126 | 98 |
| 7 | Dalton Bergan | United States | 7 | 11 | 2 | 19 | 13 | 11 | 9 | 3 | 17 | 5 | 14 | 12 | 123 | 123 |
| 8 | Henrique Anjos Anjos | Portugal | 17 | 6 | 13 | 5 | 19 | 3 | 6 | 2 | 8 | 9 | (36 DSQ) | 17 | 141 | 105 |
| 9 | Alexandros Logothetis | Greece | 9 | 8 | 8 | 16 | 15 | 7 | (36 DSQ) | 10 | 13 | 18 | 2 | 6 | 148 | 112 |
| 10 | Gal Ori | Israel | 6 | 10 | 24 | 14 | (36 OCS) | 1 | 4 | 15 | 2 | 36 OCS | 4 | 2 | 154 | 118 |
| 11 | Jussi Forsman | Finland | 20 | 9 | 1 | 8 | 12 | 14 | 12 | 7 | 11 | 17 | 9 | (22) | 142 | 120 |
| 12 | Karl Otto Book | Norway | 10 | 14 | 6 | 10 | 10 | 8 | 16 | 17 | 14 | (28) | 11 | 8 | 152 | 124 |
| 13 | David Burrows | Ireland | 15 | 30 | (35) | 7 | 8 | 13 | 5 | 22 | 9 | 10 | 15 | 14 | 183 | 148 |
| 14 | Erwan Taulois | France | 8 | 26 | 15 | 18 | 6 | 18 | 8 | (36 DSQ) | 19 | 26 | 10 | 9 | 199 | 163 |
| 15 | Luca Domenici | Italy | 25 | 4 | 18 | 15 | 18 | 20 | (36 OCS) | 14 | 12 | 6 | 18 | 19 | 205 | 169 |
| 16 | Charles Nankin | South Africa | 22 | 3 | 12 | 22 | 14 | 24 | 18 | 23 | 15 | 12 | 13 | (26) | 204 | 178 |
| 17 | David Terol | Spain | 21 | 18 | 16 | 24 | 17 | 15 | (36 DSQ) | 19 | 7 | 15 | 20 | 11 | 219 | 183 |
| 18 | Hand Erwan Bersi | Monaco | 14 | 29 | 14 | 12 | 20 | 10 | 17 | (32) | 18 | 14 | 16 | 20 | 216 | 184 |
| 19 | Gavin Pearce | Canada | 13 | 13 | 25 | 11 | 16 | 12 | 21 | 8 | 28 | (36 OCS) | 25 | 16 | 224 | 188 |
| 20 | Magnus Nilsson | Sweden | 16 | 12 | 9 | 21 | 21 | (29) | 19 | 12 | 16 | 16 | 23 | 28 | 222 | 193 |
| 21 | Kunio Suzuki | Japan | 19 | 20 | 10 | 17 | (26) | 21 | 15 | 21 | 24 | 7 | 21 | 21 | 222 | 196 |
| 22 | Michal Zera | Poland | 18 | 22 | (27) | 13 | 11 | 23 | 20 | 9 | 20 | 19 | 17 | 24 | 223 | 196 |
| 23 | Rene Dos Santos Garrafielo | Brazil | (36 DSQ) | 24 | 23 | 20 | 36 DSQ | 17 | 11 | 11 | 3 | 13 | 36 DSQ | 5 | 235 | 199 |
| 24 | Gregor Mayr | Austria | 23 | 19 | 20 | (26) | 9 | 19 | 14 | 16 | 23 | 25 | 22 | 18 | 234 | 208 |
| 25 | Somers Kempe | Bermuda | 26 | 25 | 11 | 27 | 24 | 22 | (28) | 20 | 25 | 20 | 12 | 13 | 253 | 225 |
| 26 | Luis Daniel Moreno | Mexico | 12 | 15 | (31) | 25 | 23 | 28 | 24 | 28 | 22 | 23 | 28 | 25 | 284 | 253 |
| 27 | Allan Julie | Seychelles | 24 | 21 | (26) | 23 | 22 | 26 | 23 | 25 | 26 | 21 | 19 | 23 | 279 | 253 |
| 28 | Jung-gon Kim | South Korea | 28 | 27 | 29 | 29 | (36 DSQ) | 31 | 27 | 30 | 27 | 22 | 24 | 30 | 340 | 304 |
| 29 | Brett Chivers | Guam | 30 | (33) | 33 | 28 | 27 | 25 | 25 | 24 | 29 | 30 | 26 | 27 | 337 | 304 |
| 30 | Juan Sebastián Higuera | Colombia | 29 | (36 OCS) | 19 | 33 | 28 | 27 | 26 | 31 | 30 | 24 | 30 | 32 | 345 | 309 |
| 31 | Patrick Rome | Belgium | 31 | 23 | 21 | 30 | 30 | (32) | 29 | 27 | 32 | 29 | 31 | 29 | 344 | 312 |
| 32 | Nikolas Pretzas | Cyprus | 32 | 32 | 32 | 31 | 25 | 30 | 22 | 26 | 31 | 31 | 27 | (33) | 352 | 319 |
| 33 | Pavia Mauro | Croatia | 27 | 28 | 22 | 34 | (36 DNF) | 33 | 36 DNF | 33 | 33 | 27 | 29 | 36DNF | 374 | 338 |
| 34 | Nicholas Deverell | Kenya | 33 | 31 | 30 | 32 | 29 | 35 | (36 DNF) | 29 | 34 | 32 | 32 | 31 | 384 | 348 |
| 35 | Luca Deluzzi | San Marino | 34 | 34 | 34 | 35 | 31 | 34 | (36 DNF) | 34 | 35 | 33 | 33 | 36DNF | 409 | 373 |
