= 1994 IYRU Youth Sailing World Championships – Laser Radial =

Laser Radial at the 1994 IYRU Youth Sailing World Championships
- Venue: Marathon, Greece
- Dates: 5 - 15 July 1994
- Competitors: 18 from 18 nations

Medalists
gold medal	Shelley Hesson	New Zealand
silver medal	Doris Wetzel	Germany
bronze medal	Sara Ahlen	Sweden

The Laser Radial competition at the 1994 IYRU Youth Sailing World Championships took place between 5 and 15 July 1994.

== Results ==
Pos	Helm	Country	R1	R2	R3	R4	R5	R6	R7	R8	R9	R10	R11	R12	Total	Nett
1	Shelley Hesson	New Zealand	1	(12)	3	2	1	1	4	11	7	3	4	2	51	39
2	Doris Wetzel	Germany	2	2	(12)	3	7	3	1	5	3	2	11	3	54	42
3	Sara Ahlen	Sweden	11	9	2	4	2	(19 OCS)	3	19 DSQ	1	1	1	1	73	54
4	Heidi Gordon	Australia	5	7	16	1	5	(19 OCS)	2	1	9	4	2	4	75	56
5	Tracey Tan	Singapore	3	3	8	6	3	4	5	9	4	(12)	5	7	69	57
6	Christin Feldman	United States	8	1	5	5	4	(14)	6	7	6	6	6	5	73	59
7	Efi Mantzaraki	Greece	4	(15)	4	7	11	6	7	6	5	10	8	11	94	79
8	Anna-Lisa Kaitila	Finland	9	(17)	6	17	9	5	8	2	8	7	3	8	99	82
9	Sophie Seignibrars	France	6	(16)	1	14	13	8	10	3	13	8	7	9	108	92
10	Sarah Gosling	United Kingdom	7	10	14	8	6	2	(19 OCS)	19 DNF	2	9	10	12	118	99
11	Monika Bronicka	Poland	13	(14)	10	9	8	7	11	8	11	13	9	10	123	109
12	Victoria Crowder	Canada	15	4	9	10	10	9	9	12	14	(18)	12	6	128	110
13	Suzanne Harwijne	Netherlands	12	13	15	12	15	13	(19 OCS)	4	12	5	15	13	148	129
14	Mukai Mizuki	Japan	10	6	7	15	(16)	11	14	10	10	14	16	16	145	129
15	Maria Dreyer	Portugal	(18)	5	18	13	12	10	13	13	16	15	13	14	160	142
16	Karen MacKellar	South Africa	14	11	11	11	(17)	12	12	15	15	16	14	15	163	146
17	Giorgia Talucci	Italy	16	8	17	16	(19 DNF)	15	19 OCS	14	18	11	19 DNF	19 DNF	191	172
18	Carola Cooper	Bermuda	17	(18)	13	18	14	16	15	16	17	17	17	17	195	177
