= 1998 ISAF World Sailing Games =

Event title
- Edition: 2nd

Event details
- Venue: Dubai, the United Arab Emirates
- Dates: 3–13 March
- Yachts: 470, Hobie 16, J/22, Laser, Laser Radial
- Titles: 9

The 1998 ISAF World Sailing Games was held in Dubai, the United Arab Emirates 3–13 March.

The events were women's match racing, 470 (men and women), Hobie 16 (open and women), J/22 (open and women), men's Laser and women's Laser Radial.

== Summary ==
=== Medal table ===
Rank	Nation	Gold	Silver	Bronze	Total
1	Denmark (DEN)	2	0	1	3
2	South Africa (RSA)	2	0	0	2
3	United States (USA)	1	2	0	3
4	Ukraine (UKR)	1	1	0	2
5	France (FRA)	1	0	1	2
5	Great Britain (GBR)	1	0	1	2
7	Finland (FIN)	1	0	0	1
8	Italy (ITA)	0	3	1	4
9	Australia (AUS)	0	1	1	2
10	Belgium (BEL)	0	1	0	1
10	Netherlands (NED)	0	1	0	1
12	Greece (GRE)	0	0	2	2
13	Germany (GER)	0	0	1	1
13	Sweden (SWE)	0	0	1	1
Totals (14 entries)		9	9	9	27

=== Event medalists ===
Event	Gold	Silver	Bronze
Men's 470	Finland; Petri Johannes Leskinen; Kristian Heinilä	Ukraine; Yevhen Braslavets; Igor Matvienko	France; Gildas Philippe; Tanguy Cariou
Women's 470	Ukraine; Ruslana Taran; Olena Pakholchyk	Italy; Federica Salvà; Emanuela Sossi	Greece; Sofia Bekatorou; Emilia Tsoulfa
Open Hobie 16	South Africa; Shaun Ferry; Alison Lewis	Italy; Stefan Griesmeyer; Edward Canepa	Australia; Brad Sumner; Amy Johnstone
Women's Hobie 16	South Africa; Inge Schabort; Gillian Anley	United States; Anne Nelson; Heidi Schlageter	Germany; Ulla Becker; Dagmar Albers
Open J/22	France; François Brenac; Herve Cunningham; Claire-Marie Dubreucq; Robert Moner	Italy; Flavio Favini; Paolo Mereghetti; Massimo Paolacci; Giovanni Sommarriva	Italy; Vasco Vascotto; Serena Cima; Flavio Grassi; Federico Michetti
Women's J/22	Denmark; Dorte Jensen; Helle Jespersen; Rachel Kiel Nielsen; Annette Strøm	United States; Elizabeth Alison; Nancy Haberland; Diana Hall; Kristan McClintock	Great Britain; Shirley Robertson; Helewa Carr; Sally Cuthbert; Joanne Grindley
Laser	Ben Ainslie (GBR)	Michael Blackburn (AUS)	Daniel Birgmark (SWE)
Laser Radial	Kristine Roug (DEN)	Carolijn Brouwer (BEL)	Georgia Chimona (GRE)
Women's match racing	United States; Elizabeth Alison	Netherlands; Klaartje Zuiderbaan	Denmark; Dorte Jensen
