= SIH =

SIH, Sih, or variation, may refer to:

== People ==
- Li Sih (280 BC–208 BC), Chinese philosopher
- Sih Cabgu (died 633), a khagan in the Western Turkic Khaganate
- Jihng Sih (1775–1844), Chinese pirate
- Bryant Sih (born 1967), Taiwanese sailor
- Brady Sih (born 1970), Taiwanese sailor

== Places ==
- Shifa International Hospital, Islamabad, Pakistan; see List of cancer hospitals in Pakistan
- Singapore Islamic Hub, a religious campus in Singapore
- Doti Airport (IATA airport code SIH), Dipayal Silgadhi, Doti, Sudurpashchim, Nepal
- Siu Hong station (MTR station code SIH), Hong Kong
- St Helier railway station (National Rail station code SIH), London, England, UK

== Other uses ==
- Scottish Ice Hockey, the governing body for ice hockey in Scotland
- Skynet Airlines (ICAO airline code SIH)
- Zire language (ISO 639 language code sih)
- Silylidyne (SiH or HSi), a molecule composed of silicon and hydrogen in a 1:1 ratio
- South Irish Horse, a Special Reserve cavalry regiment of the British Army
- Spontaneous intracranial hypotension, disease, caused by spinal cerebrospinal fluid loss, presents with *Orthostatic headache

== See also ==
- SIHS (disambiguation)
