= ISAF World Sailing Games =

- First held: 1994
- Last held: 2006
- Organizer: International Sailing Federation
- Classes: 420, 470, 49er, Hobie 16, Hobie Tiger, Laser, Laser Radial, RS:X (2006)

ISAF Sailing Games were a sailing festival organised by the International Sailing Federation held every four years from 1994 to 2006.

== History ==
Beginning in 1994, ISAF World Sailing Games were held on four occasions. The 1994 IYRU Cup saw more than 1000 sailors from 76 countries. The events were match racing, 470 (men and women), Hobie 16 (open and women), women's J/22, J/24, men's Laser, women's Laser Radial.

In 1998, ISAF hosted the 1998 ISAF World Sailing Games in women's match racing, 470 (men and women), Hobie 16 (open and women), J/22 (open and women), men's Laser and women's Laser Radial.

For the 2002 event, the selected classes were 470 (men and women), Hobie 16 (open and women), women's J/22, J/80, men's Laser, women's Laser Radial, Techno 293 (open and women). In the 2002 event, each country could have two sailors per event, with addition to the ISAF rankings leaders in Olympic classes, winners of the preceding 1998 games and winners of the 2000 Olympics.

The 2006 ISAF World Sailing Games had 420 team racing, 470 (men and women), 49er, women's Hobie 16, Hobie Tiger, men's Laser, women's Laser Radial, and RS:X (men and women). In the 2006 event, sailors from similar classes were invited to participate, e.g. the medalists from 2005 Finn Gold Cup and the world champions in Byte, Contender, and OK were invited to the men's one-person dinghy event in Laser.

== Editions ==
Host cities of the ISAF World Sailing Games

Year	City	Country	Dates	Events	Athletes	Nations	Note
1994	La Rochelle	France	25 July – 7 August	9	>1,000	76	
1998	Dubai	United Arab Emirates	3–13 March	9	<1,000	67	
2002	Marseille	France	29 June – 10 July	10			
2006	Lake Neusiedl	Austria	10–20 May	10			

== Equipment ==
Event	Class	Gender	Year			
			94	98	02	06
One-person dinghies	Laser	M	●	●	●	●
One-person dinghies	Laser Radial	W	●	●	●	●
Two-person dinghies	470	M	●	●	●	●
Two-person dinghies	470	W	●	●	●	●
Two-person dinghies	49er	O				●
Keelboats	J/22	O		●		
Keelboats	J/22	W	●	●	●	
Keelboats	J/24	M	●			
Keelboats	J/80	O			●	
Multi-hulls	Hobie 16	O	●	●	●	
Multi-hulls	Hobie 16	W	●	●	●	●
Multi-hulls	Hobie Tiger	O				●
Boards	RS:X	M				●
Boards	RS:X	W				●
Boards	Techno 293	O			●	
Boards	Techno 293	W			●	
Match racing	Match racing	O	●			
Match racing	Match racing	W		●		
Team racing	420	O				●
Total			9	9	10	10

Legend: M – Men; W – Women; Mx – Mixed; O – Open;
