= 1994 IYRU Youth Sailing World Championships =

Event title
- Edition: 24th

Event details
- Venue: Marathon, Greece
- Dates: 5 - 15 July 1994

The 1994 IYRU Youth Sailing World Championships took place in Marathon, Greece from 5 through to 15 July 1994. It was the 24th edition of the ISAF Youth Sailing World Championships.

== Competition format ==
=== Events and equipment ===
| Event | Equipment |
|---|---|
| Male single hander dinghy | Laser |
| Female single hander dinghy | Laser Radial |
| Male dinghy (double hander) | Laser II |
| Female dinghy (double hander) | Laser II |
| Male windsurfer | Mistral |
| Female windsurfer | Mistral |

== Summary ==
=== Medal table ===
* Host nation (Greece)

| Rank | Nation | Gold | Silver | Bronze | Total |
|---|---|---|---|---|---|
| 1 | New Zealand | 2 | 0 | 2 | 4 |
| 2 | Germany | 1 | 1 | 1 | 3 |
| 3 | Great Britain | 1 | 1 | 0 | 2 |
| 4 | Israel | 1 | 0 | 0 | 1 |
| 4 | United States | 1 | 0 | 0 | 1 |
| 6 | France | 0 | 1 | 1 | 2 |
| 6 | Poland | 0 | 1 | 1 | 2 |
| 8 | Australia | 0 | 1 | 0 | 1 |
| 8 | Brazil | 0 | 1 | 0 | 1 |
| 10 | Sweden | 0 | 0 | 1 | 1 |
| Totals (10 entries) | | 6 | 6 | 6 | 18 |

=== Event medalists ===
==== Men's events ====
| Event | First | Second | Third |
|---|---|---|---|
| Laser | Dan Slater; New Zealand | Ben Ainslie; Great Britain | Philipp Buchert; Germany |
| Laser II | David James; PJ Buhler; United States | Rodrigo Amado; Leonardo Santos; Brazil | Justin Steel; Christian Stevens; New Zealand |
| Minstral | Amir Levinson; Israel | Stephane Jaouen; France | Pawel Gordasiewicz; Poland |

==== Women's events ====
| Event | First | Second | Third |
|---|---|---|---|
| Laser Radial | Shelley Hesson; New Zealand | Doris Wetzel; Germany | Sara Ahlen; Sweden |
| Laser II | Storm Nuttal; Sally Cuthbert; Great Britain | Briohny Hooper; Amanda Miller; Australia | Susie Wood; Jennifer Cheyne; New Zealand |
| Minstral | Amelie Lux; Germany | Agata Pokorowska; Poland | Justine Gardahaut; France |

== Results ==
=== Boy's Laser II ===
| Pos | Sail No. | Name | Tot | Net | R1 | R2 | R3 | R4 | R5 | R6 | R7 | R8 | R9 | R10 | R11 | R12 |
|---|---|---|---|---|---|---|---|---|---|---|---|---|---|---|---|---|
| 1 | USA 12 | David Ames (USA); PJ Buhler (USA) | 47 | 63 | 7 | 9 | 1 | 5 | 3 | 5 | 7 | 5 | 2 | 1 | 2 | ~~16~~ |
| 2 | BRA 33 | Rodrigo Amado (BRA); Leonardo Santos (BRA) | 47 | 58 | 8 | 6 | 4 | 3 | 1 | ~~11~~ | 6 | 1 | 6 | 3 | 7 | 2 |
| 3 | AUS 37 | Justin Steel (AUS); Christian Stevens (AUS) | 50 | 73 | 9 | 1 | 2 | ~~(OCS)~~; ~~23~~ | 8 | 2 | 13 | 3 | 1 | 6 | 1 | 4 |
| 4 | NZL 2 | Simon Cooke (NZL); Matthew Brown (NZL) | 53 | 76 | 3 | 4 | 3 | 2 | 7 | 1 | 5 | 6 | 11 | 7 | 4 | ~~(DSQ)~~; ~~23~~ |
| 5 | GBR 13 | Spencer Murray (GBR); Paul Kamean (GBR) | 55 | 66 | 5 | 2 | 6 | ~~11~~ | 4 | 9 | 8 | 9 | 3 | 5 | 3 | 1 |
| 6 | ITA 25 | Vincenzo Florida (ITA); Marco Gambardella (ITA) | 87 | 102 | 1 | 3 | ~~15~~ | 4 | 12 | 6 | 3 | 13 | 13 | 15 | 6 | 11 |
| 7 | FRA 4 | Nicolas Novara (FRA); Romain Dubreuil (FRA) | 92 | 108 | 2 | 14 | 5 | 7 | 9 | ~~16~~ | 2 | 14 | 10 | 4 | 11 | 14 |
| 8 | ESP 34 | Casto Martinez (ESP); Octavio Rodriguez (ESP) | 93 | 116 | 4 | 7 | 8 | 17 | 5 | 4 | 20 | 4 | ~~(DSQ)~~; ~~23~~ | 13 | 8 | 3 |
| 9 | POR 22 | Marcelo Fonte (POR); Sergio Fonte (POR) | 98 | 121 | ~~(DNF)~~; ~~23~~ | 5 | 12 | 9 | 17 | 10 | 1 | 11 | 12 | 9 | 5 | 7 |
| 10 | FIN 10 | Ilmari Kuusi (FIN); Toni Okkonen (FIN) | 107 | 127 | 15 | 8 | 7 | 14 | 2 | 8 | 16 | 8 | 5 | ~~20~~ | 15 | 9 |
| 11 | NED 18 | Jeroen Den Boer (NED); Jaap Thorn (NED) | 109 | 132 | 6 | 13 | 11 | 10 | ~~(DSQ)~~; ~~23~~ | 7 | 11 | 2 | OCS; 23 | 2 | 9 | 15 |
| 12 | GER 8 | Philip Barth (GER); Markus Schmid (GER) | 128 | 151 | 12 | 10 | 13 | 1 | ~~(DSQ)~~; ~~23~~ | 3 | 19 | 19 | 14 | 8 | 16 | 13 |
| 13 | ISR 7 | Gal Udi (ISR); Krul Tomer (ISR) | 128 | 151 | 13 | 12 | ~~(DSQ)~~; ~~23~~ | 8 | 14 | 17 | 4 | 7 | 15 | 10 | 10 | 18 |
| 14 | CAN 28 | Jeremy Wallace (CAN); Ross Chandler (CAN) | 131 | 151 | 14 | 15 | ~~20~~ | 12 | 11 | 14 | 15 | 12 | 4 | 17 | 12 | 5 |
| 15 | GRE 36 | Aggelos Lemanis (GRE); Spyros Lemanis (GRE) | 137 | 157 | 11 | 11 | 16 | 18 | 6 | 12 | 9 | 17 | 9 | 11 | 17 | ~~20~~ |
| 16 | RSA 6 | Janier Hermida (RSA); Mark Redfern (RSA) | 139 | 160 | 16 | 20 | 10 | 15 | 10 | ~~21~~ | 10 | 15 | 8 | 14 | 13 | 8 |
| 17 | JPN 15 | Sanbu Taisei (JPN); Okinishi Yoshihiro (JPN) | 157 | 180 | 18 | 19 | 9 | ~~(DSQ)~~; ~~23~~ | 15 | 13 | 14 | 10 | 16 | 18 | 19 | 6 |
| 18 | SWE 24 | Gustav Dahlberg (SWE); Oscar Jacobson (SWE) | 163 | 186 | 10 | 16 | 14 | ~~(DNF)~~; ~~23~~ | 13 | 15 | 12 | 16 | 7 | DNF; 23 | 14 | DNF; 23 |
| 19 | ZIM 30 | Roger Hudson (ZIM); Dallas Tacon (ZIM) | 182 | 205 | 19 | 22 | 19 | 6 | 16 | 18 | 18 | ~~(OCS)~~; ~~23~~ | 19 | 12 | OCS; 23 | 10 |
| 20 | BEL 35 | Francois Lambotte (BEL); Nicolas Spileboudt (BEL) | 188 | 211 | 17 | 17 | 17 | 13 | 19 | 20 | 22 | 18 | 17 | 16 | ~~(DSQ)~~; ~~23~~ | 12 |
| 21 | HKG 5 | Adam Mowser (HKG); Mark Collins (HKG) | 199 | 220 | 20 | 18 | 18 | 16 | 18 | 19 | 17 | 20 | 18 | ~~21~~ | 18 | 17 |
| 22 | BER 39 | Duncan Simons (BER); Kevin Zuill (BER) | 224 | 246 | 21 | 21 | 21 | 19 | 20 | ~~22~~ | 21 | 21 | 20 | 19 | 20 | 21 |

=== Girl's Laser II ===
| Pos | Sail No. | Name | Tot | Net | R1 | R2 | R3 | R4 | R5 | R6 | R7 | R8 | R9 | R10 | R11 | R12 | Ref. |
|---|---|---|---|---|---|---|---|---|---|---|---|---|---|---|---|---|---|
| 1 | GBR 26 | Storm Nuttal (GBR); Sally Cuthbert (GBR) | 38 | 47 | 4 | 7 | 2 | 1 | 2 | ~~9~~ | 2 | 1 | 8 | 4 | 3 | 4 | |
| 2 | AUS 14 | Briohny Hooper (AUS); Amanda Miller (AUS) | 40 | 56 | 2 | 2 | 1 | 6 | ~~(OCS)~~; ~~16~~ | 2 | 12 | 8 | 2 | 1 | 1 | 3 | |
| 3 | NZL 27 | Susie Wood (NZL); Jennifer Cheyne (NZL) | 46 | 62 | 1 | 3 | 4 | ~~(DSQ)~~; ~~16~~ | 3 | 1 | 9 | 2 | DSQ; 16 | 2 | 4 | 1 | |
| 4 | NED 1 | Barbara Snieders (NED); Wynke Bodewes (NED) | 56 | 72 | 5 | 1 | 10 | 3 | 10 | 6 | 4 | ~~(OCS)~~; ~~16~~ | 1 | 5 | 2 | 9 | |
| 5 | FRA 23 | Fanny Bourdouxhe (FRA); Magali Pallanca (FRA) | 59 | 70 | 3 | 4 | 7 | 9 | 1 | 8 | 1 | 5 | 7 | ~~11~~ | 6 | 8 | |
| 6 | RSA 29 | Dale Hudson (RSA); Dominique Provoyeur (RSA) | 67 | 80 | 10 | 8 | 5 | 2 | 9 | 4 | 3 | ~~13~~ | 9 | 7 | 5 | 5 | |
| 7 | GRE 3 | Dimitra Mylona (GRE); Maria Bakaniari (GRE) | 77 | 93 | 13 | 5 | 9 | 4 | 7 | 7 | 13 | 6 | 3 | 3 | 7 | ~~(OCS)~~; ~~16~~ | |
| 8 | POR 32 | Maria Fortunato (POR); Maria Anjos (POR) | 79 | 93 | 8 | 6 | ~~14~~ | 7 | 12 | 3 | 5 | 3 | 5 | 9 | 14 | 7 | |
| 9 | GER 17 | Ulrike Leu (GER); Anke Telthorster (GER) | 89 | 105 | 6 | 9 | 3 | 8 | 11 | 10 | 10 | 7 | 11 | 12 | ~~(DSQ)~~; ~~16~~ | 2 | |
| 10 | USA 21 | Christina Bickley (USA); Stephanie Doyle (USA) | 93 | 109 | 7 | 13 | 8 | 5 | ~~(OCS)~~; ~~16~~ | 5 | 11 | 9 | 6 | 10 | 8 | 11 | |
| 11 | CAN 16 | Annie-Claude Ethier (CAN); MarieFrance Ethier (CAN) | 96 | 112 | 14 | 10 | 6 | ~~(DSQ)~~; ~~16~~ | 6 | 11 | 7 | 4 | 4 | 14 | 10 | 10 | |
| 12 | JPN 19 | Mikiko Tokuda (JPN); Saiko Kojima (JPN) | 103 | 119 | 12 | 11 | 11 | ~~(DNF)~~; ~~16~~ | 4 | 12 | 6 | 12 | 14 | 6 | 9 | 6 | |
| 13 | SWE 20 | Malin Alberts (SWE); Therese Andersson (SWE) | 118 | 134 | 9 | 12 | 12 | ~~(DSQ)~~; ~~16~~ | 8 | dnf 16 | 8 | 11 | 10 | 8 | 11 | 13 | |
| 14 | ITA 11 | Guilia Majolino (ITA); Marta Sacco (ITA) | 129 | 145 | 11 | ~~(DSQ)~~; ~~16~~ | 13 | 11 | 5 | dnf 16 | 14 | 10 | 12 | 13 | 12 | 12 | |
| 15 | BER 31 | Megan Spurling (BER); Lucu Wozniak (BER) | 156 | 172 | 15 | 14 | 15 | 10 | ~~(OCS)~~; ~~16~~ | dnf 16 | 15 | 14 | 13 | 15 | 13 | OCS; 16 | |

=== Boy's Mistral ===
| Pos | Sail No. | Name | Tot | Net | R1 | R2 | R3 | R4 | R5 | R6 | R7 | R8 | R9 | R10 | R11 | R12 |
|---|---|---|---|---|---|---|---|---|---|---|---|---|---|---|---|---|
| 1 | ISR 3 | Amir Levinson (ISR) | 23 | 30 | 1 | 1 | 1 | 5 | 2 | 3 | 1 | 3 | 1 | 2 | 3 | ~~7~~ |
| 2 | FRA 38 | Stephane Jaouen (FRA) | 49 | 60 | 4 | 5 | 2 | 1 | 7 | 6 | 4 | 5 | 3 | 1 | ~~11~~ | 11 |
| 3 | POL 7 | Pawel Gardahaut (POL) | 52 | 60 | 7 | ~~8~~ | 7 | 3 | 1 | 8 | 8 | 1 | 4 | 6 | 1 | 6 |
| 4 | AUS 25 | Moulson Beaudel (AUS) | 52 | 62 | 8 | 3 | 4 | 2 | ~~10~~ | 5 | 2 | 2 | 2 | 10 | 9 | 5 |
| 5 | NZL 6 | Jon Paul Tobin (NZL) | 77 | 106 | 6 | 7 | 6 | 8 | 3 | 4 | 6 | ~~(DNS)~~; ~~29~~ | 6 | 9 | 5 | 17 |
| 6 | GER 19 | Alexeander Baronjan (GER) | 79 | 93 | 9 | 2 | ~~14~~ | 4 | 9 | 2 | 12 | 7 | 5 | 5 | 12 | 12 |
| 7 | GBR 49 | Dean Tomlinson (GBR) | 83 | 103 | 5 | 4 | 5 | ~~20~~ | 4 | 11 | 3 | 10 | 9 | 11 | 20 | 1 |
| 8 | ITA 33 | Marco Casagrande (ITA) | 87 | 113 | 2 | 17 | 3 | 7 | 6 | 10 | 9 | 11 | 15 | 4 | ~~26~~ | 3 |
| 9 | ARG 52 | Mariano Reutemann (ARG) | 89 | 118 | 3 | 11 | 8 | 6 | 5 | 1 | 7 | ~~(DSQ)~~; ~~29~~ | DSQ; 29 | 8 | 2 | 9 |
| 10 | BEL 53 | Tom Verlinde (BEL) | 104 | 123 | 14 | 12 | ~~19~~ | 12 | 11 | 12 | 10 | 6 | 11 | 7 | 7 | 2 |
| 11 | USA 10 | Scott Haladay (USA) | 132 | 152 | 10 | 6 | 9 | 19 | 15 | 17 | 17 | 12 | 10 | 13 | 4 | ~~20~~ |
| 12 | NED 35 | Otto Fabrian (NED) | 135 | 164 | 11 | 16 | 20 | ~~(DSQ)~~; ~~29~~ | 8 | 7 | 11 | 4 | 18 | 19 | 8 | 13 |
| 13 | FIN 44 | Gustaf Sundell (FIN) | 137 | 158 | 15 | 15 | 13 | 14 | 21 | 9 | 15 | 13 | 12 | 17 | 6 | 8 |
| 14 | JPN 36 | Kento Yoshimoto (JPN) | 146 | 168 | 13 | 9 | 10 | 16 | 13 | 14 | 13 | 17 | 19 | ~~22~~ | 18 | 4 |
| 15 | CAN 27 | Stephan Lidington (CAN) | 149 | 178 | 12 | 13 | 17 | 9 | 14 | 15 | ~~(DNS)~~; ~~29~~ | 15 | 16 | 15 | 13 | 10 |
| 16 | ALG 45 | Abenacer Goudjil (ALG) | 156 | 185 | 18 | 22 | 18 | 10 | 22 | 13 | ~~(DNS)~~; ~~29~~ | 9 | 8 | 3 | 15 | 18 |
| 17 | ESP 1 | Jose Manuel Ochoa (ESP) | 156 | 179 | 16 | 10 | ~~23~~ | 13 | 20 | 18 | 14 | 8 | 7 | 12 | 22 | 16 |
| 18 | GRE 8 | Diamantis Pepelasis (GRE) | 193 | 222 | 19 | 18 | 16 | 15 | 17 | 24 | 16 | ~~(OCS)~~; ~~29~~ | 23 | 14 | 16 | 15 |
| 19 | AHO 24 | Ingmar Schwitzler (AHO) | 198 | 224 | 25 | ~~26~~ | 25 | 23 | 12 | 19 | 5 | 19 | 22 | 20 | 14 | 14 |
| 20 | SEY 31 | Jonathan Barbe (SEY) | 203 | 229 | ~~26~~ | 24 | 12 | 18 | 19 | 20 | 18 | 21 | 14 | 21 | 17 | 19 |
| 21 | SWE 5 | Andreas Tagesson (SWE) | 208 | 237 | 17 | 19 | 15 | 17 | 18 | 22 | ~~(DNS)~~; ~~29~~ | 18 | 13 | OCS; 29 | 19 | 21 |
| 22 | RUS 22 | Alecksey Drotchev (RUS) | 209 | 238 | 21 | 14 | 24 | 11 | 23 | 16 | ~~(DNF)~~; ~~29~~ | 16 | 20 | 18 | 24 | 22 |
| 23 | CYP 28 | Kostas Simeonidis (CYP) | 230 | 259 | 24 | 23 | 21 | 26 | 25 | 23 | ~~(DNS)~~; ~~29~~ | 14 | 17 | 24 | 10 | 23 |
| 24 | KOR 26 | Sung Hyun Kim (KOR) | 230 | 259 | 23 | 20 | 22 | 21 | 16 | 21 | ~~(DNF)~~; ~~29~~ | 20 | 21 | 16 | 25 | 25 |
| 25 | ZIM 2 | Shane Drummond (ZIM) | 269 | 298 | 20 | 21 | 28 | 22 | 26 | 27 | ~~(DNF)~~; ~~29~~ | 23 | 26 | 26 | 23 | 27 |
| 26 | POR 9 | Andre Concalves (POR) | 270 | 299 | 28 | 27 | 26 | 24 | 24 | 25 | ~~(DNS)~~; ~~29~~ | 24 | 24 | 23 | 21 | 24 |
| 27 | RSA 15 | Wayne Guerin (RSA) | 282 | 311 | 27 | 25 | 27 | 25 | 27 | 26 | ~~(DNS)~~; ~~29~~ | 22 | 25 | 25 | 27 | 26 |
| 28 | BUL 43 | Alexander Stoilov Chander (BUL) | 294 | 323 | 22 | ~~(DNF)~~; ~~29~~ | 11 | DSQ; 29 | DNS; 29 | DNS; 29 | DNS; 29 | DNC; 29 | DNC; 29 | DNC; 29 | DNC; 29 | DNC; 29 |

=== Girl's Mistral ===
| Pos | Sail No. | Name | Tot | Net | R1 | R2 | R3 | R4 | R5 | R6 | R7 | R8 | R9 | R10 | R11 | R12 |
|---|---|---|---|---|---|---|---|---|---|---|---|---|---|---|---|---|
| 1 | GER | Amelie Lux (GER) | 25 | 35 | ~~10~~ | 3 | 2 | 1 | 2 | 3 | 2 | 1 | 4 | 1 | 1 | 5 |
| 2 | POL | Agata Pokorowska (POL) | 32 | 41 | ~~9~~ | 1 | 3 | 2 | 1 | 7 | 3 | 3 | 1 | 2 | 8 | 1 |
| 3 | FRA | Justine Gardahaut (FRA) | 38 | 51 | 3 | 4 | 1 | 7 | 3 | 1 | 1 | ~~13~~ | 3 | 3 | 10 | 2 |
| 4 | ITA | Letizia Romanacci (ITA) | 53 | 74 | 13 | 5 | 5 | 5 | 6 | 5 | ~~(DNF)~~; ~~21~~ | 2 | 2 | 4 | 3 | 3 |
| 5 | SIN | Ashley Kearns (SGP) | 63 | 84 | 15 | 2 | 4 | 3 | 4 | 4 | 5 | ~~(OCS)~~; ~~21~~ | 10 | 5 | 5 | 6 |
| 6 | NOR | Kristin Songe-Moller (NOR) | 68 | 89 | 1 | 10 | 10 | 4 | 5 | 2 | ~~(DNF)~~; ~~21~~ | 6 | 6 | 8 | 7 | 9 |
| 7 | ESP | Saioa Arambarri (ESP) | 82 | 97 | 8 | 11 | ~~15~~ | 11 | 10 | 9 | 4 | 4 | 5 | 6 | 6 | 8 |
| 8 | ISR | Sivan Yosep (ISR) | 92 | 113 | 12 | 6 | 6 | 6 | 15 | 10 | ~~(DNF)~~; ~~21~~ | 5 | 7 | 9 | 4 | 12 |
| 9 | NZL | Julie Worth (NZL) | 96 | 113 | 2 | 12 | ~~17~~ | 10 | 11 | 16 | 6 | 12 | 8 | 7 | 2 | 10 |
| 10 | BEL | Vanessa Peters (BEL) | 112 | 133 | 17 | 8 | 9 | 9 | 7 | 14 | ~~(DNF)~~; ~~21~~ | 7 | 12 | 10 | 12 | 7 |
| 11 | AUS | Tania Newton (AUS) | 127 | 148 | 11 | 14 | 13 | 17 | 8 | 6 | ~~(DNF)~~; ~~21~~ | 15 | 16 | 14 | 9 | 4 |
| 12 | GRE | Angeliki Skarlatou (GRE) | 128 | 149 | 5 | 7 | 11 | 12 | 12 | 12 | ~~(DNF)~~; ~~21~~ | 17 | 11 | 11 | 17 | 13 |
| 13 | ARG | Cecilia Armando (ARG) | 130 | 151 | 16 | ~~(DNF)~~; ~~21~~ | 7 | 14 | 9 | 8 | DNF; 21 | 8 | 9 | 13 | 14 | 11 |
| 14 | USA | Cara Reid (USA) | 146 | 167 | 14 | 13 | 12 | 8 | 17 | 13 | ~~(DNF)~~; ~~21~~ | 14 | 14 | 12 | 13 | 16 |
| 15 | GBR | Becky French-Grenslade (GBR) | 150 | 171 | 6 | 9 | 8 | 15 | 16 | 17 | ~~(DNF)~~; ~~21~~ | 9 | 17 | 17 | 19 | 17 |
| 16 | POR | Catarina Fagundes (POR) | 159 | 180 | 18 | 15 | 16 | 16 | 14 | 11 | ~~(DNF)~~; ~~21~~ | 11 | 13 | 15 | 16 | 14 |
| 17 | NED | Anke Keijsers (NED) | 169 | 190 | 4 | ~~(DNF)~~; ~~21~~ | 14 | 19 | 13 | 15 | DNF; 21 | 16 | 18 | 19 | 15 | 15 |
| 18 | BUL | Irina Konstantinova (BUL) | 168 | 189 | 7 | ~~(DNF)~~; ~~21~~ | 18 | 13 | DSQ; 21 | DSQ; 21 | 7 | OCS; 21 | 15 | 16 | 11 | 18 |
| 19 | CAN | Christine Beale (CAN) | 208 | 229 | 19 | ~~(DNF)~~; ~~21~~ | 19 | 18 | DNF; 21 | DNF; 21 | DNF; 21 | 10 | 20 | 20 | 18 | DNF; 21 |
| 20 | RSA | Penny Noel (RSA) | 220 | 241 | 20 | ~~(DNF)~~; ~~21~~ | 20 | 20 | DNF; 21 | DNF; 21 | DNF; 21 | 18 | 19 | 19 | 20 | DNF; 21 |
