= Leonardo dos Santos =

Leonardo dos Santos or Leonardo Santos may refer to:

- Leonardo Santos (sailor) (born 1977), Brazilian sailor
- Leonardo dos Santos Silva (born 1976), Brazilian footballer
- Leonardo Bruno dos Santos Silva, a.k.a. China, Brazilian footballer
- Leonardo Henrique Peixoto dos Santos (born 1977), Brazilian footballer
- Dedê (Leonardo de Deus Santos, born 1978), Brazilian footballer
- Léo Fortunato (Leonardo Fortunato dos Santos, born 1983), Brazilian footballer
- Leonardo Santos (fighter) (born 1980), Brazilian mixed martial artist
- Leonardo Coelho Santos (born 1995), Brazilian swimmer
- Leonardo Santos (handballer), Brazilian handball player
