= Martin Rodriguez =

Martin Rodriguez may refer to:

- Martín Rodríguez (politician), Argentine politician
- Martín Rodríguez (tennis), Argentine tennis player
- Martin Rodrigues, drummer of the 1970s band Captain Beyond
- Martín Rodríguez (field hockey) (born 1990), Chilean field hockey player
- Martín Rodríguez (footballer, born 1968), Peruvian footballer
- Martín Rodríguez (footballer, born 1970), Uruguayan footballer
- Martín Rodríguez (footballer, born 1985), Uruguayan footballer
- Martín Rodríguez (footballer, born 1989), Uruguayan footballer
- Martín Rodríguez (footballer born 1994), Chilean footballer
- Martín Rodríguez (rugby union) (born 1985), Argentine rugby union player
- Martín Rodríguez (sailor) (born 1974), Argentine Olympic sailor
- Martín Emilio Rodríguez (born 1942), Colombian cyclist
