= 1993 Sandown 6 Hour =

Track map of the Sandown Raceway

The 1993 Sandown 6 Hour was an endurance race for production cars which was staged at Sandown Raceway, near Melbourne in Victoria, Australia on Sunday, 21 February 1993. The race was won by Peter Fitzgerald and Brett Peters, driving a Porsche 968 CS.

== Classes ==
Cars competed in six classes:

- Class A
- Class B
- Class C
- Class D
- Class S
- Class T

The defining parameters of the six classes have not yet been ascertained.

== Qualifying ==
The fastest lap in Qualifying was set by Gregg Hansford, driving a Mazda RX-7, with a lap time of 1:25.06.

== Results ==
Pos.	Class	No.	Team	Drivers	Car	Laps
1	C	4		(Australia) Peter Fitzgerald (Australia) Brett Peters (Australia) Nicholas Leutwiler	Porsche 968 CS	239
2	C	5		(Australia) John Smith (Australia) Geoff Morgan (Australia) Kevin Waldock	Porsche 968 CS	239
3	T	7		(Australia) John Bowe (Australia) Garry Waldon	Mazda RX-7	238
4	T	1		(Australia) Charlie O'Brien (Australia) Gregg Hansford	Mazda RX-7	238
5	C	8		(Australia) Ian Palmer (Australia) Wayne Gardner (Australia) Ross Palmer	Honda NSX	234
6	T	41		(Australia) John Trimbole (Australia) Rohan Cooke	Mitsubishi Lancer GSR	220
7	A	42		(Australia) Mark Brame (Australia) Henry Draper	Suzuki Swift GTi	220
8	S	2		(Australia) Peter Whitaker (Australia) Calvin Gardiner (Australia) Geoff Forshaw	Toyota MR2	218
9	B	53		(Australia) Steve Hardman (Australia) David Stone (Australia) Jon Targett	Hyundai Lantra	215
10	A	21		(Australia) Danny Bogut (Australia) Peter Howard (Australia) Owen Crombie	Suzuki Swift GTi	214
11	T	17	Dick Johnson Racing	(Australia) Dick Johnson (Australia) Cameron McConville (Australia) Steven Johnson	Ford Laser TX3 4WD	214
12	B	18		(Australia) Murray Carter (Australia) John Morriss (Australia) Phil Morriss	Nissan Pulsar SSS	213
13	S	28		(Australia) David Wood (Australia) Stephen Craig (Australia) Peter Janssen	Nissan NX Coupe	211
14	T	23		(Australia) Ryan (Australia) Dutton (Australia) Runciman	Mitsubishi Lancer GSR	210
15	A	33		(Australia) Sala (Australia) Swaine (Australia) Zagame	Toyota Corolla SX	210
16	B	16		(Australia) Peter McLeod (Australia) Glenn Clark (United Kingdom) Peter Janson	Citroën BX	193
17	B	22	Garry Rogers Motorsport	(Australia) Steven Richards (Australia) Melinda Price (Australia) Paul Fordham	Nissan Pulsar SSS	185
NC	C	50		(Australia) Kevin Burton (Australia) Peter Vorst (Australia) Mark Gibbs	Ford EB Falcon S	179
NC	D	9		(Australia) Jim Baird (Australia) Mark Larmour (Australia) Kent Youlden	Ford Falcon XR8	79
DNF	A	21		(Australia) Ferrier (Australia) Parsons (Australia) Robson	Suzuki Swift GTi	137
DNF	B	11		(Australia) Renato (Australia) Muscat	Hyundai Lantra	107
DNF	T	6		(Australia) Thomson (Australia) Sala (Australia) Showers	Mitsubishi Lancer GSR	87

- Race time of winning car: 6-00:09.72
- Fastest race lap: 1:25.84 – Bowe/Waldon (Mazda RX-7)
