= 2004 ISAF Youth Sailing World Championships =

Event title
- Edition: 34th

Event details
- Venue: Gdynia, Poland
- Dates: 8–17 July 2004

The 2004 ISAF Youth Sailing World Championships took place on the Gdynia, Poland, from 8 to 17 July 2004. It was the 34th edition of the ISAF Youth Sailing World Championships.

== Competition format ==
=== Events and equipment ===
Event	Equipment
Men's dinghy (single hander)	Laser
Men's dinghy (double hander)	420
Men's windsurfer	Minstral
Women's dinghy (single hander)	Laser Radial
Women's dinghy (double hander)	420
Women's windsurfer	Minstral
Open Multihull	Hobie 16

== Summary ==
=== Medal table ===
* Host nation (Poland)

Rank	Nation	Gold	Silver	Bronze	Total
1	Great Britain	2	0	3	5
2	Australia	2	0	0	2
2	Poland*	2	0	0	2
4	France	1	3	0	4
5	Germany	0	1	1	2
6	Croatia	0	1	0	1
6	Israel	0	1	0	1
6	New Zealand	0	1	0	1
9	Italy	0	0	2	2
10	Guatemala	0	0	1	1
Totals (10 entries)		7	7	7	21

=== Event medalists ===
==== Men's events ====
Event	First	Second	Third
Laser	Giles Scott; Great Britain	Towci Stipanovic; Croatia	Simon Groteluschen; Germany
420	Nathan Outteridge; Iain Jensen; Australia	Thomas Rahier; Mathieu Rahier; France	Jonny McGovern; Stuart Bithell; Great Britain
Minstral	Kamil Lewandowski; Poland	Nimrod Mashiah; Israel	Federico Esposito; Italy

==== Women's events ====
Event	First	Second	Third
Laser Radial	Sarah Steyaert; France	Jo Aleh; New Zealand	Charlotte Dobson; Great Britain
420	Elise Rechichi; Tess Parkinson; Australia	Lydia Koppin; Kristina Kummer; Germany	Pippa Wilson; Hariette Trumble; Great Britain
Minstral	Zofia Klepacka; Poland	Anne Sophie Le Page; France	Laura Linares; Italy

==== Open events ====
Event	First	Second	Third
Hobie 16	Tom Phipps; Jon Cook; Great Britain	Julien Villion; Martin Bataille; France	Juan Ignacio Maegli; Jason Hess; Guatemala
