= Andrew Stone (sailor) =

New Zealand sailor

Personal information
- Nationality: New Zealand
- Born: 19 January 1969 (age 56); Auckland, New Zealand

Sport
- Sport: Sailing

Andrew Stone (born 19 January 1969) is a New Zealand sailor. He competed in the men's 470 event at the 1996 Summer Olympics.
