= Elise Rechichi =

Australian sailor (born 1986)

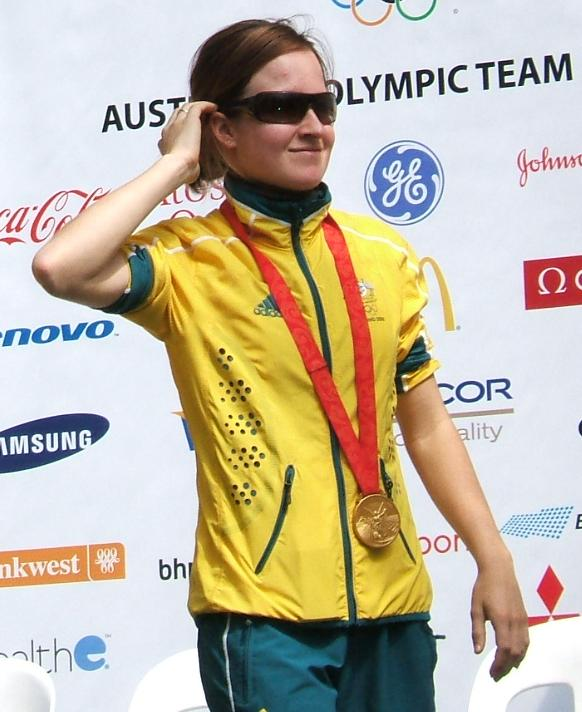
- Rechichi in 2008

Personal information
- Full name: Elise Maree Rechichi
- Born: 11 January 1986 (age 40) Perth, Western Australia
- Spouse: Karl Reindler

Sailing career
- Sport: Sailing
Medal record
Women's sailing
Representing Australia
Olympic Games
Gold medal – first place	2008 Beijing	Women's 470 class
420 World Championships
Gold medal – first place	2004 Mornington	Women's 420 class
470 World Championships
Bronze medal – third place	2008	Women's 420 class
Youth Sailing World Championships
Gold medal – first place	2004	Female 420 class
Gold medal – first place	2003	Female 420 class
Silver medal – second place	2002	Female 29er
World Sailing Games
Silver medal – second place	2002 Marseille	Women's 470 class
470 European Championship
Bronze medal – third place	2007	Women's 470 class
Bronze medal – third place	2008	Women's 470 class

Elise Maree Rechichi OAM (born 11 January 1986) is an Australian sailor from Perth, Western Australia. Rechichi and crewmate Tessa Parkinson represented Australia in the 470 class at the 2008 Summer Olympics in Qingdao, Shandong, China, winning the gold medal. She was an Australian Institute of Sport scholarship holder.

In 2023 Rechichi and Parkinson were inducted as a team into the Australian Sailing Hall of Fame.

Reichichi is married to racing driver Karl Reindler, and they have two children.
