= SIHS =

SIHS is an abbreviation, acronym, or initialism that may refer to:

- Shalamar Institute of Health Sciences, in Shalimar Town, Lahore, Pakistan
- Sherman Indian High School, in Riverside, California
- South Iredell High School, in Troutman, North Carolina
- St Ives High School, in Sydney, Australia
- Symbiosis Institute of Health Sciences, in Pune, India

== See also ==
- SIH (disambiguation)
