= Pedro Fernández (sailor) =

Cuban sailor

Personal information
- Born: 21 April 1964 (age 60); Ciego de Ávila, Cuba

Sport
- Sport: Sailing

Pedro Fernández (born 21 April 1964) is a Cuban sailor. He competed in the men's 470 event at the 1996 Summer Olympics.
