= Şükrü Sanus =

Turkish sailor

Personal information
- Nationality: Turkish
- Born: 26 December 1966 (age 58)

Sport
- Sport: Sailing

Şükrü Sanus (born 26 December 1966) is a Turkish sailor. He competed in the men's 470 event at the 1996 Summer Olympics.
