= Joseph Stockhausen =

Jamaican sailor

Personal information
- Nationality: Jamaican
- Born: 25 June 1965 (age 59)

Sport
- Sport: Sailing

Joseph Stockhausen (born 25 June 1965) is a Jamaican sailor. He competed in the men's 470 event at the 1996 Summer Olympics.
