= Botond Litkey =

Hungarian sailor

Personal information
- Nationality: Hungarian
- Born: 2 June 1967 (age 57); Balmazújváros, Hungary

Sport
- Sport: Sailing

Botond Litkey (born 2 June 1967) is a Hungarian sailor. He competed in the men's 470 event at the 1996 Summer Olympics.
