= Jean-Pierre Ziegert =

Swiss sailor

Personal information
- Nationality: Swiss
- Born: 24 September 1968 (age 57)

Sport
- Sport: Sailing

Jean-Pierre Ziegert (born 24 September 1968) is a Swiss sailor. He competed in the men's 470 event at the 1996 Summer Olympics.
