= Martín Billoch =

Argentine sailor (1959–2025)

Personal information
- Full name: Martín Billoch Tasso
- Nationality: Argentine
- Born: 5 November 1959
- Died: 13 June 2025 (aged 65)

Sport
- Sport: Sailing

Martín Billoch Tasso (5 November 1959 – 13 June 2025) was an Argentine sailor. He competed in the men's 470 event at the 1996 Summer Olympics.

Billoch died on 13 June 2025, at the age of 65.
