= Owen McMahon =

Australian sailor

Personal information
- Nationality: Australian
- Born: 4 August 1970 (age 55) Melbourne, Australia

Sport
- Sport: Sailing

Owen McMahon (born 4 August 1970) is an Australian sailor. He competed in the men's 470 event at the 1996 Summer Olympics.
