= Igor Karvaš =

Slovak sailor

Personal information
- Nationality: Slovak
- Born: 18 June 1967 (age 57); Bratislava, Czechoslovakia

Sport
- Sport: Sailing

Igor Karvaš (born 18 June 1967) is a Slovak sailor. He competed in the men's 470 event at the 1996 Summer Olympics.
