= Jaroslav Ferianec =

Slovak sailor

Personal information
- Nationality: Slovak
- Born: 13 August 1970 (age 54); Bratislava, Czechoslovakia

Sport
- Sport: Sailing

Jaroslav Ferianec (born 13 August 1970) is a Slovak sailor. He competed in the men's 470 event at the 1996 Summer Olympics.
