= Brian Storey =

Canadian sailor

Personal information
- Nationality: Canadian
- Born: 4 September 1971 (age 55) Richmond, British Columbia, Canada

Sport
- Sport: Sailing

Brian Storey (born 4 September 1971) is a Canadian sailor. He competed in the men's 470 event at the 1996 Summer Olympics.
