= Andrew Service =

Hong Kong sailor

Personal information
- Nationality: Hong Konger
- Born: 29 March 1961 (age 63)

Sport
- Sport: Sailing

Andrew Service (born 29 March 1961) is a Hong Kong sailor. He competed in the men's 470 event at the 1996 Summer Olympics.
