= Chan Yuk Wah =

Hong Kong sailor

Personal information
- Nationality: Hong Konger
- Born: 3 January 1964 (age 61)

Sport
- Sport: Sailing

Chan Yuk Wah (born 3 January 1964) is a Hong Kong sailor. He competed in the men's 470 event at the 1996 Summer Olympics.
