= 1996 470 European Championships =

The 1996 470-European-Sailing-Championship was held between June 6 and 15 1996. It was discharged before Hayling Island.

And was extended in both a women's and a men's competition 470-boat class, in which the Russian men Berezkin / Burmatnow and among women the Ukrainians Taran / Pakholchyk after twelve races the European title won.

== Results ==
=== Men ===
Place	Land	Athlete	Points
1	RUS	Dmitry Berezkin / Jewgeni Burmatnow	53.50
2	POR	Hugo Rocha / Nuno Barreto	66.25
3	GBR	John Merricks / Ian Walker	74.00

=== Women ===
Place	Land	Athlete	Points
1	UKR	Ruslana Taran / Olena Pakholchyk	55.50
2	AUS	Jenny Lidgett / Addy Bucek	59.75
3	GER	Susanne Bauckholt / Katrin Adlkofer	60.75
