= Marcus Westerlind =

Swedish sailor

Personal information
- Nationality: Swedish
- Born: 15 December 1969 (age 55); Gothenburg, Sweden

Sport
- Sport: Sailing

Marcus Westerlind (born 15 December 1969) is a Swedish sailor. He competed in the men's 470 event at the 1996 Summer Olympics.
