= Paul Hannam =

Canadian doctor and sailor (1971–2022)

Personal information
- Born: 7 October 1971 Vancouver, British Columbia, Canada
- Died: 16 July 2022 (aged 50) Toronto, Ontario, Canada
- Occupation: Physician

Sport
- Sport: Sailing

Paul Hannam (7 October 1971 – 16 July 2022) was a Canadian physician and sailor. He competed in the men's 470 event at the 1996 Summer Olympics. He died aged 50 while running.

== Education ==
Hannam was a 1999 graduate in medicine from the University of British Columbia.

== Career ==
At the time of his death, Hannam was the chief of emergency medicine and program director at North York General Hospital in Toronto. He was also an assistant professor at the University of Toronto’s Department of Family and Community Medicine. Previously, he served as chief of emergency medicine at Michael Garron Hospital in East York for over a decade.

Hannam died after collapsing while on a run on 16 July 2022, aged 50.

== Family life ==
Hannam was married to Rosemary Hannam.
