= Rohan Cooke =

New Zealand sailor

Personal information
- Nationality: New Zealand
- Born: 7 December 1974 (age 51) Hamilton, New Zealand

Sport
- Sport: Sailing

Rohan Cooke (born 7 December 1974) is a New Zealand sailor. He competed in the men's 470 event at the 1996 Summer Olympics.
