= Bryant Sih =

Taiwanese sailor

Personal information
- Nationality: Taiwanese
- Born: 21 September 1967 (age 57); Oakland, California, United States

Sport
- Sport: Sailing

Bryant Sih (born 21 September 1967) is a Taiwanese sailor. He competed in the men's 470 event at the 1996 Summer Olympics.
