= Brady Sih =

Taiwanese sailor

Personal information
- Nationality: Taiwanese
- Born: 19 October 1970 (age 54); Oakland, California, United States

Sport
- Sport: Sailing

Brady Sih (born 19 October 1970) is a Taiwanese sailor. He competed in the men's 470 event at the 1996 Summer Olympics.
