= Lisa Ross (sailor) =

Canadian sailor

Personal information
- Born: 13 June 1977 (age 49) Lunenburg, Nova Scotia, Canada

Sport
- Sport: Sailing

Lisa Ross (born 13 June 1977) is a Canadian sailor. She competed at the 2004 Summer Olympics and the 2008 Summer Olympics.
