= Torsten Haverland =

German sailor

Personal information
- Nationality: German
- Born: 6 September 1965 (age 59); Neustadt, East Germany

Sport
- Sport: Sailing

Torsten Haverland (born 6 September 1965) is a German former sailor. He competed in the men's 470 event at the 1996 Summer Olympics.
