= Brett Chivers =

Guamanian sailor

Personal information
- Nationality: Guamanian
- Born: 14 December 1976 (age 48)

Sport
- Sport: Sailing

Brett Chivers (born 14 December 1976) is a Guamanian sailor. He competed at the 1996 Summer Olympics and the 2000 Summer Olympics.
