= Ronald Rensch =

German sailor (1966–2021)

Personal information
- Nationality: German
- Born: 8 July 1966; Neuruppin, East Germany
- Died: 7 December 2021 (aged 55)

Sport
- Sport: Sailing

Ronald Rensch (8 July 1966 – 7 December 2021) was a German sailor. He competed in the men's 470 event at the 1996 Summer Olympics.
