= Marko Mišura =

Croatian sailor

Personal information
- Nationality: Croatian
- Born: 21 June 1971 (age 53); Split, Yugoslavia

Sport
- Sport: Sailing

Marko Mišura (born 21 June 1971) is a Croatian sailor. He competed in the men's 470 event at the 1996 Summer Olympics.
