= Philip Barth =

German yacht racer (born 1976)

Philip Barth (born 10 March 1976) is a German former yacht racer who competed in the 2000 Summer Olympics.
