= Rodrigo Amado =

Brazilian sailor

Personal information
- Born: 18 May 1976 (age 50) Rio de Janeiro, Brazil

Sport
- Sport: Sailing
- College team: St. Mary's College of Maryland

Rodrigo Amado (born 18 May 1976) is a Brazilian sailor. He competed in the men's 470 event at the 1996 Summer Olympics.
