= Martín Rodríguez (sailor) =

Argentine sailor

Personal information
- Nationality: Argentine
- Born: 5 October 1974 (age 50)

Sport
- Sport: Sailing

Martín Rodríguez (born 5 October 1974) is an Argentine sailor. He competed in the men's 470 event at the 1996 Summer Olympics.
