= John Merricks =

English sailor (1971–1997)

Personal information
- Full name: John Edward Merricks
- Born: 16 February 1971 Leicester, England
- Died: 8 October 1997 (aged 26) Castiglione della Pescaia, Italy
- Height: 173 cm (5 ft 8 in)
- Weight: 62 kg (137 lb)

Sailing career
- Sport: Sailing
- Class(es): 420, 470, Fireball, Laser II
Medal record
Men's sailing
Representing Great Britain
Olympic Games
Silver medal – second place	1996 Atlanta	470

John Edward Merricks (16 February 1971 – 8 October 1997) was an English sailor. He represented Great Britain at the 1996 Summer Olympics in Atlanta, where he received the silver medal in the 470 class along with his sailing partner, Ian Walker. At the 1996 470 European Championships he and Walker won the silver medal.

Merricks died in a car accident in Italy on 8 October 1997. He and Walker were passengers in a minivan when the driver lost control. A lake at Watermead Park is named after him.
