= Hobie Tiger =

Sailboat class

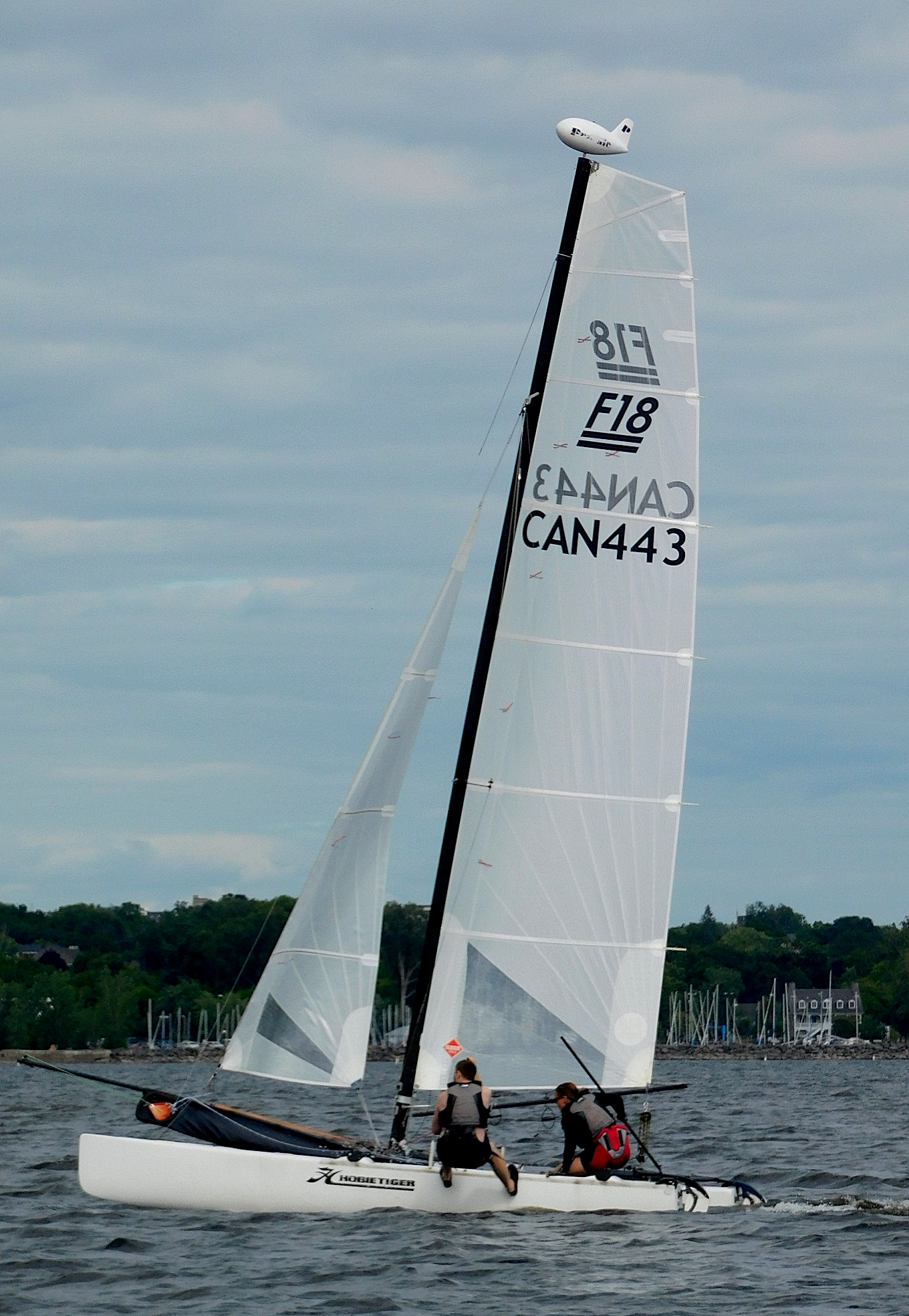
- F18

Development
- Designer: Jacques Valer
- Location: France
- Year: 1995
- Builder: Hobie Cat Europe
- Role: Racer
- Name: Hobie Tiger

Boat
- Crew: two
- Displacement: 397 lb (180 kg)
- Draft: 2.33 ft (0.71 m) with a daggerboard down

Hull
- Type: catamaran
- Construction: fiberglass
- LOA: 18.08 ft (5.51 m)
- Beam: 8.53 ft (2.60 m)

Hull appendages
- Keel: twin daggerboards
- Rudder: twin transom-mounted rudders

Rig
- Rig type: Bermuda rig
- I foretriangle height: 18.83 ft (5.74 m)
- P mainsail luff: 28 ft (8.5 m)

Sails
- Sailplan: fractional rigged sloop
- Mainsail area: 183 sq ft (17.0 m^{2})
- Jib/genoa area: 45 sq ft (4.2 m^{2})
- Gennaker area: 226 sq ft (21.0 m^{2})
- Other sails: solent: 37 sq ft (3.4 m^{2})
- Upwind sail area: 228 sq ft (21.2 m^{2})
- Downwind sail area: 409 sq ft (38.0 m^{2})

Racing
- Class association: Formula 18
- RYA PN: 693

The Hobie Tiger or Hobie Tiger 18, is a French catamaran sailboat that was designed by Jacques Valer for Hobie Cat Europe as a Formula 18 racer and first built in 1995.

The boat is an International Sailing Federation recognized international class.

== Production ==
The design was built by Hobie Cat Europe in France, starting in 1995 and later by the parent company Hobie Cat in the United States in 2001, but it is now out of production.

== Design ==
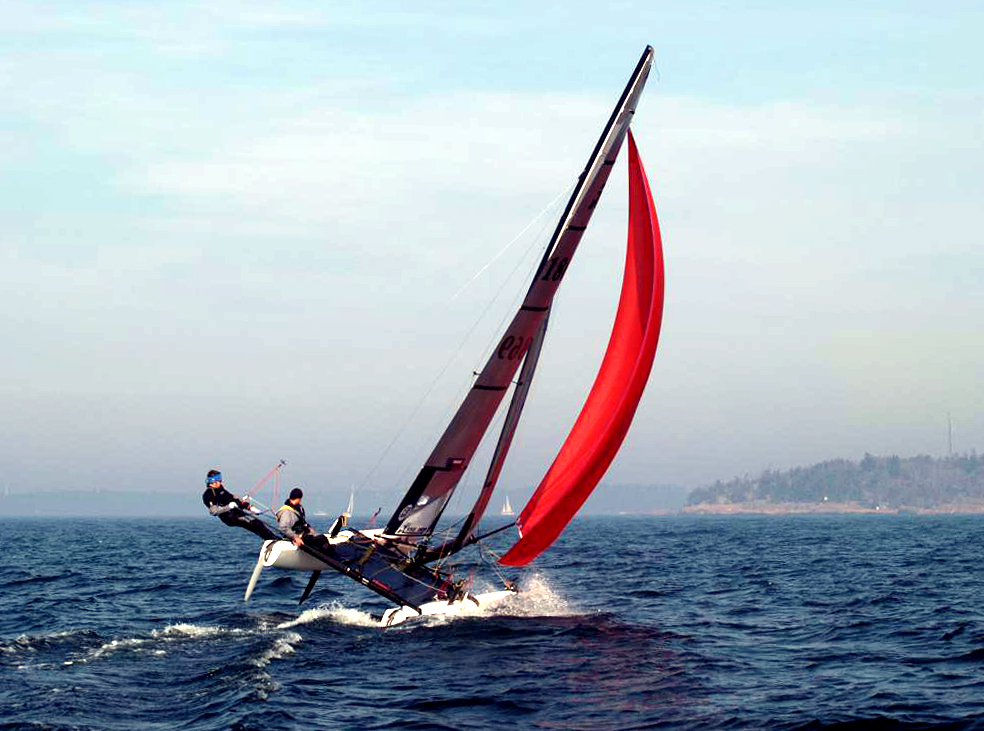
Hobie Tiger flying its asymmetrical spinnaker

The Hobie Tiger is a sailing dinghy, with the twin hulls built predominantly of polyester fiberglass sandwich with a foam core.

The hulls have plumb stems and transoms, transom-hung rudders controlled by a single tiller and twin retractable daggerboards. It has a fractional sloop rig with aluminum spars, including a rotating mast, stepped on the fore beam. The rigging is wire. It displaces 397 lb (180 kg) and is normally sailed by a crew of two sailors, both of whom are provided with trapezes to balance the boat.

The boat has a draft of 2.33 ft (0.71 m) with a daggerboard extended and 3.00 in (7.6 cm) with both retracted, allowing operation in shallow water, beaching or ground transportation on a trailer.

For sailing downwind the design may be equipped with an asymmetrical spinnaker of 226 sq ft (21.0 m^{2}).

The design has a Portsmouth Yardstick RYA PN handicap number of 693.

== See also ==
- List of multihulls
- List of sailing boat types
