= Ian Walker (sailor) =

British sailor

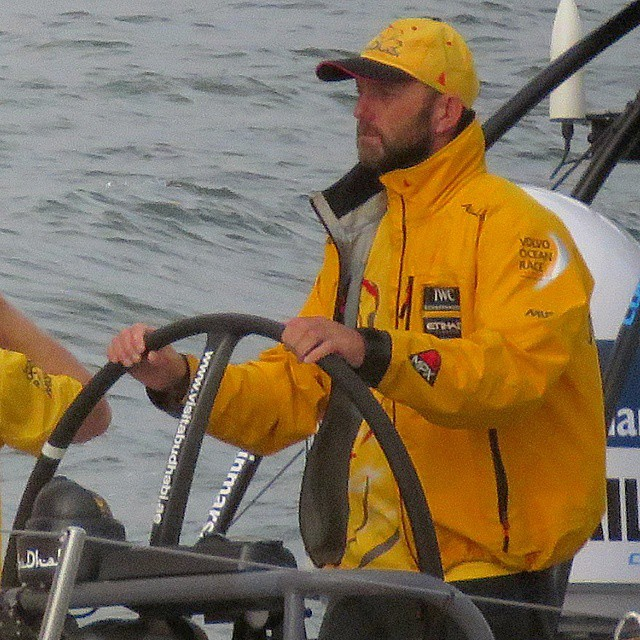

Personal information
- Full name: Ian James Walker
- Born: 25 February 1970 (age 56) Worcester, England

Sailing career
- Sport: Sailing
Medal record
Men's sailing
Representing Great Britain
Olympic Games
Silver medal – second place	1996 Atlanta	470
Silver medal – second place	2000 Sydney	Star

Ian James Walker (born 25 February 1970) is one of Britain's most successful sailors, with two Olympic silver medals to his name. He is a member of Northampton Sailing Club and Warsash Sailing Club.

== Career ==
=== Early life ===
Walker, together with Chris Fox, won the 1993 International 14 World Championship.

=== Olympic sailing ===
At the 1996 Summer Olympics in Savannah, Walker received the silver medal in the 470 class along with his sailing partner, John Merricks. At the 1996 470 European Championships he won the bronze medal with his partner John Merricks. On 15 October 1997, both Walker and Merricks were passengers in a minivan in Italy when the driver lost control, and Merricks was killed.

In 1999, Walker began sailing with Mark Covell. At the 2000 Summer Olympics in Sydney, Walker and Covell won the silver medal in the Star class.

Walker also coached Shirley Robertson and her Yngling team to gold at the 2004 Athens Olympics.

=== America's Cup ===
When Great Britain launched its first bid for the America's Cup for 14 years in 2000, Walker was named as the skipper. Then, in the 2007 America's Cup he joined fellow Olympic medallist Iain Percy as the tactician of the Italian team +39 Challenge. His America's Cup commitments were combined with the highly successful TP52 campaign as skipper of Patches, owned by Eamon Conneely.

=== Volvo Ocean Race ===
==== 2008–09 Volvo Ocean Race ====
In the 2008–09 Volvo Ocean Race, he was the skipper of the boat Green Dragon. the boat finished fifth in this race out of eight competitors.

==== 2011–12 Volvo Ocean Race ====
In the 2011–12 Volvo Ocean Race, Walker skippered Abu Dhabi's first entry in the Volvo Ocean Race – Abu Dhabi Ocean Racing. Overall the team finished fifth out of the six competitors.

==== 2014–15 Volvo Ocean Race ====
Ian Walker was also appointed as skipper of Abu Dhabi's next entry, Azzam into the 2014–15 Volvo Ocean Race, sailing the new VO65 class. He successfully lead the team to victory, securing an insurmountable point lead over the other teams on the second to last leg. During this race the team also won the in-port race series and set a 24-hour distance record of 550.82 nautical miles (1,020.12 km; 633.87 mi) while approaching Cape Horn.

== Records held ==
- Fastest circumnavigation – Isle of Wight – 2 hours 21 minutes (Foncia) August 2012. Ratified by the World Sailing Speed Record Council
- Fastnet Monohull Race record – 42hrs 39min, (Volvo Open 70 Abu Dhabi) in August 2011
