= Shelley Hesson =

New Zealand sailor

Personal information
- Born: 22 March 1976 (age 50)

Sport
- Country: New Zealand
- Sport: Sailing

Shelley Hesson (born 22 March 1976) is a New Zealand sailor. She competed at the 2004 Summer Olympics in Athens, in the women's 470 class.
