= Leonardo Santos (sailor) =

Brazilian sailor

Personal information
- Born: 2 February 1977 (age 48); Rio de Janeiro, Brazil

Sport
- Sport: Sailing

Leonardo Santos (born 2 February 1977) is a Brazilian sailor. He competed in the men's 470 event at the 1996 Summer Olympics.
