= Hugo Rocha =

Portuguese sailor (born 1972)

Vítor Hugo Simão do Vale Rocha, ComIH (born 13 April 1972) is a Portuguese competitive sailor and Olympic medalist. He won a bronze medal in the 470 class at the 1996 Summer Olympics in Atlanta, along with his partner Nuno Barreto.

At the 1996 470-European-Sailing-Championship he won with his Partner Nuno Barreto the silver medal.

He won the J/80 World Championship in 2013 and the SB20 World Championship in 2016.
