= Nuno Barreto =

Portuguese sailor (born 1972)

Personal information
- Full name: Nuno Miguel Santos Barreto
- Nationality: Portuguese
- Born: 29 April 1972 (age 54) Lisbon, Portugal

Sailing career
- Sport: Sailing

Nuno Miguel Santos Barreto, ComIH (born 29 April 1972) is a Portuguese competitive sailor and Olympic medalist.

He won a bronze medal in the 470 class at the 1996 Summer Olympics in Atlanta, along with his partner Hugo Rocha.

At the 1996 470-European-Sailing-Championship he won with his Partner Hugo Rocha the silver medal.
