= Olena Pakholchyk =

Ukrainian sailor

Medal record

Women's sailing

Olympic Games

Representing Ukraine
Bronze medal – third place	1996 Atlanta	470 class
Bronze medal – third place	2000 Sydney	470 class

World Championships

Representing Soviet Union
Silver medal – second place	1991 Brisbane	470 class

Representing Ukraine
Gold medal – first place	1997 Tel Aviv	470 class
Gold medal – first place	1998 Mallorca	470 class
Gold medal – first place	1999 Melbourne	470 class
Silver medal – second place	1995 Toronto	470 class

European Championships

Representing Soviet Union
Silver medal – second place	1991 Bergen	470 class

Representing CIS
Bronze medal – third place	1992 Nieuwpoort	470 class

Representing Ukraine
Gold medal – first place	1995 Bastad	470 class
Gold medal – first place	1996 Hayling Island	470 class
Gold medal – first place	1997 Nieuwpoort	470 class
Gold medal – first place	1998 Çeşme	470 class
Gold medal – first place	1999 Zadar	470 class

Olena Ivanivna Pakholchyk (Ukrainian: Олена Іванівна Пахольчик; born 2 November 1964 in Pavlodar Region, Kazakh SSR, Soviet Union) is a Ukrainian sailor.

At the 1996 470-European-Sailing-Championship she won with her Partner Ruslana Taran the gold medal.
