= Ruslana Taran =

Ukrainian sailor (born 1970)

Personal information
- Full name: Ruslana Oleksiïvna Taran
- Born: 27 October 1970 (age 55) Yevpatoria, Ukrainian SSR, Soviet Union

Sailing career
- Sport: Sailing
Medal record
Women's sailing
Representing Ukraine
Olympic Games
Silver medal – second place	2004 Athens	Yngling class
Bronze medal – third place	1996 Atlanta	470 class
Bronze medal – third place	2000 Sydney	470 class
World Championships
Gold medal – first place	1997 Tel Aviv	470 class
Gold medal – first place	1998 Mallorca	470 class
Gold medal – first place	1999 Melbourne	470 class
Silver medal – second place	1995 Toronto	470 class
European Championships
Gold medal – first place	1993 Breitenbrunn	470 class
Gold medal – first place	1995 Bastad	470 class
Gold medal – first place	1996 Hayling Island	470 class
Gold medal – first place	1997 Nieuwpoort	470 class
Gold medal – first place	1998 Çeşme	470 class
Gold medal – first place	1999 Zadar	470 class

Ruslana Oleksiïvna Taran (Ukrainian: Руслана Олексіївна Таран; born 27 October 1970 in Yevpatoria, Ukrainian SSR, Soviet Union) is a Ukrainian sailor.

At the 1996 470-European-Sailing-Championship, she won with her Partner Olena Pakholchyk the gold medal.
