= Hobie 16 =

Sailboat class

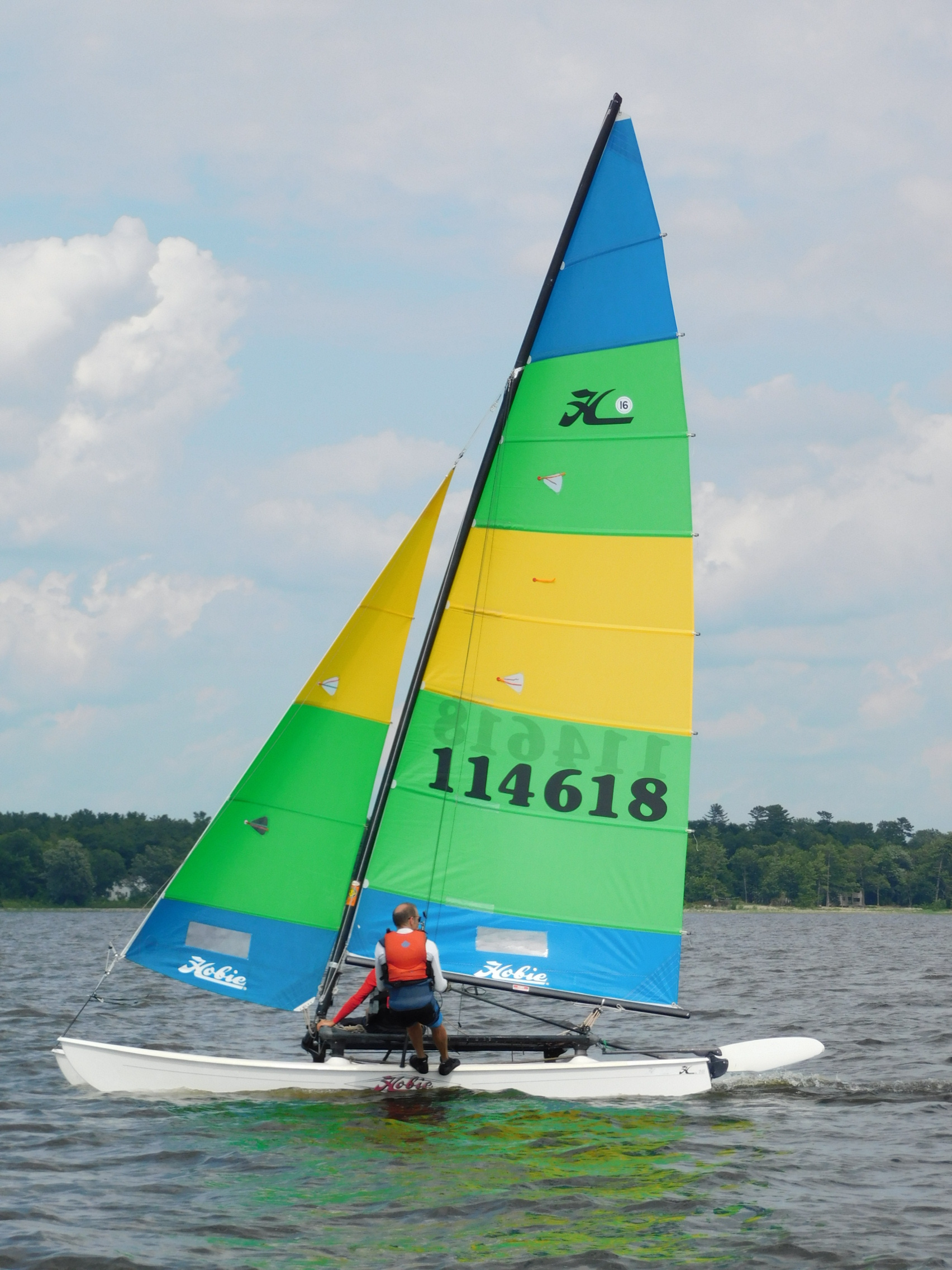

Development
- Designer: Hobie Alter, Phil Edwards
- Year: 1970
- Name: Hobie 16

Boat
- Crew: 1-4
- Draft: 0.25m (rudder up)
- Trapeze: 2

Hull
- Type: Catamaran
- Construction: Fiberglass
- Hull weight: 145 kg (320 lb)
- LOA: 5.05 m (16 ft 7 in)
- Beam: 2.41 m (7 ft 11 in)

Hull appendages
- Keel: None

Rig
- Rig type: Bermuda Sloop
- Mast height: 8.08 m (26 ft 6 in)

Sails
- Mainsail area: 13.77 m^{2} (148.2 ft^{2})
- Jib/genoa area: 5.12 m^{2} (55.1 ft^{2})
- Spinnaker area: 17.5 m^{2} (188 ft^{2})
- Total sail area: 20 m^{2} (220 ft^{2})

Racing
- D-PN: 76.0
- RYA PN: 811

The ISAF International Class Hobie 16 (H16) is a popular catamaran manufactured by the Hobie Cat Company for racing and day sailing. The craft was the driving force behind the popularization of beachcats.

Introduced in 1971, the Hobie 16 is the second largest boat fleet in existence with over 135,000 boats built to date.

The boat is distinctly recognized for its asymmetric "banana" shaped hulls, designed to work without the need for daggerboards so the catamaran could be run up the beach without worry. The rudders kick up automatically by lifting up on the tiller crossbar.

== Design ==
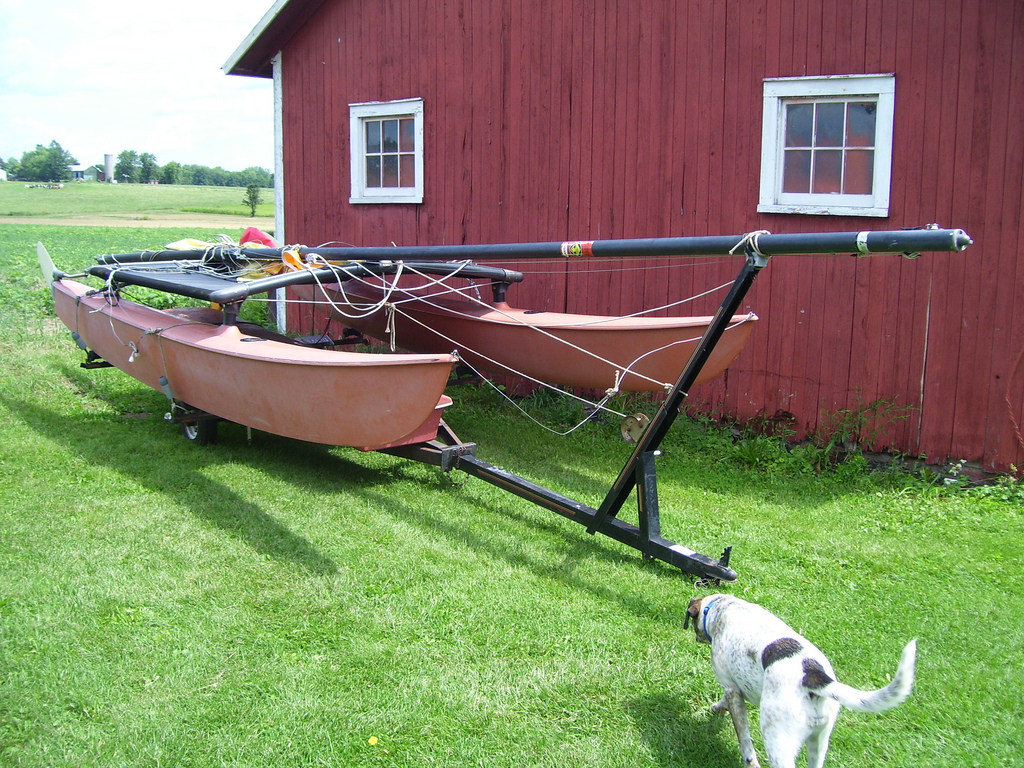
A de-rigged Hobie 16

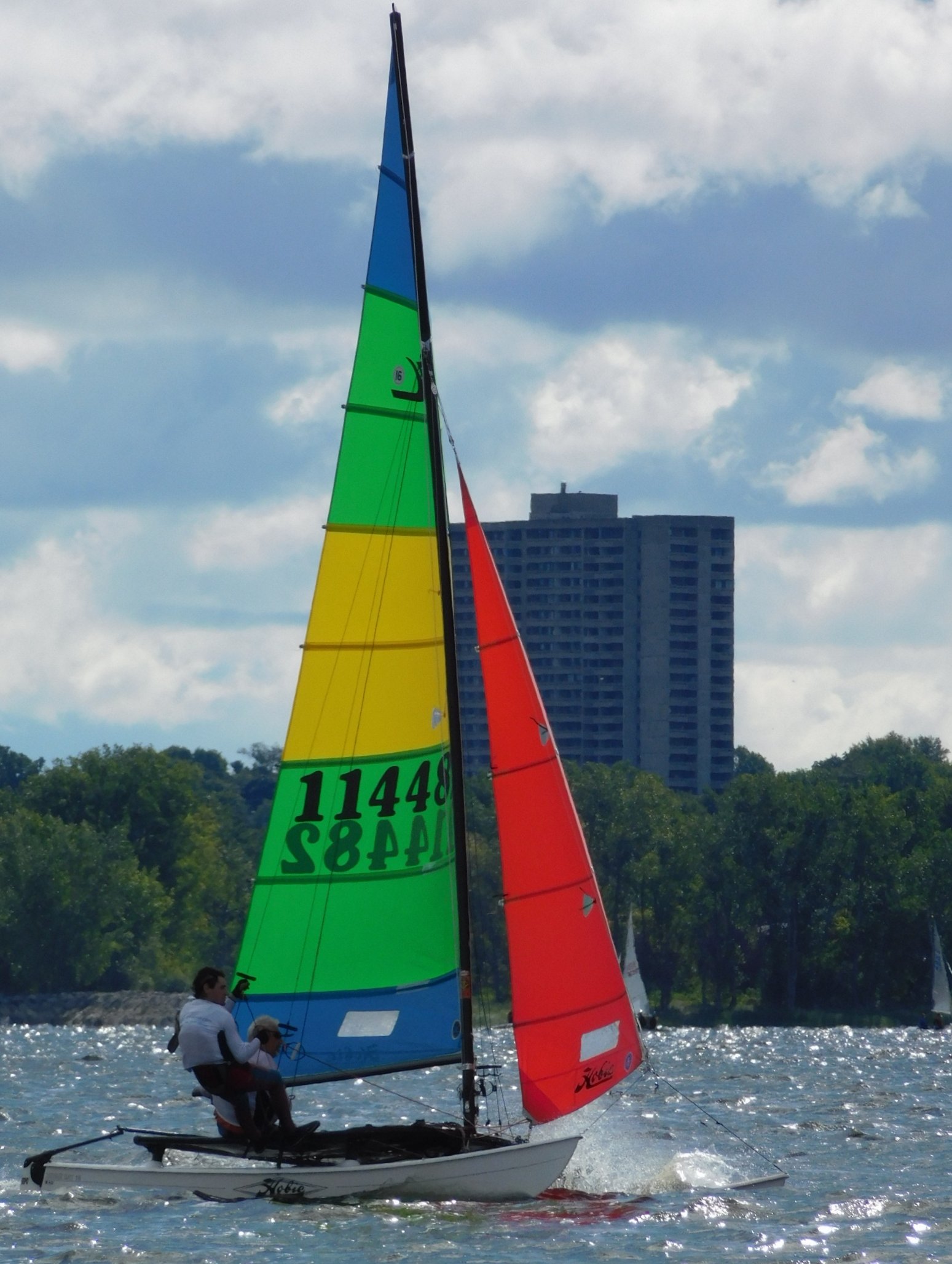
Hobie 16

The Hobie 16 is manufactured in France by the Hobie Cat company, and by the Hobie Cat of America company in the United States.

The Hobie 16 normally carries two sails, the mainsail and the jib. There is a kit to allow an H16 to fly a spinnaker but this is only class legal for youth racing.

Each hull has two pylons (the forward ones are vented to allow the pressure inside the hull to equalise) and the frame fits onto these pylons. The frame consists of four aluminium alloy beams which slot into four aluminium alloy corner castings and are secured with rivets. The trampoline slots along the inside of the beams and is tensioned by rope or shock cord.

Earlier masts were one piece, of aluminium alloy, but were changed to two pieces with a non-conductive composite fiberglass tip (known as "comptip"), after a few people in the United States of America were electrocuted trying to raise masts under power lines and their families sued Hobie Cat. The mast foot casting forms a ball which steps into a cup-shaped shoe riveted onto the forward crossmember and there is a Teflon disk separating the two. The downward compressive force from the mast is partially carried by the crossmember and partially by a stainless steel compression post and tensioned tie rod assembly called a "dolphin striker".

The H16 may be equipped with two trapeze wires either side to allow both the helm and crew to trapeze. "Trapseats" can be fitted to allow disabled sailors to sail the H16.

The rudder assembly consists of a rudder on each hull fitted to a Hobie-patented automatically releasing stock comprising a casting, a cam, and a spring-loaded plunger. This allows the rudders to spring up when they hit ground, to avoid damage. The rudders are connected to two short tillers which are in turn attached via a ball and socket joint to a connecting rod called the tiller bar. The tiller attaches to the centre of the tiller bar and is typically extendable for operation while trapezing.

The mainsheet has a maximum of a 6:1 purchase and has a traveller that allows movement over the entire aft crossmember of the frame. The jib sheets are of a 2:1 purchase and attach on the front beams with their own two travellers.

The boat has a 3:1 purchase downhaul (upgradable to 6:1) to tension the mainsail and an outhaul (standard 1:1, upgradable to 2:1) to flatten the mainsail along the boom. Both the mainsail and jib are fully battened.

== See also ==
- List of multihulls
- Hobart "Hobie" Alter company founder and creator of the Hobie Cat
- Hobie Cat
- Limit of Positive Stability
