= Australia at the 2020 Summer Olympics =

- IOC code: AUS
- NOC: Australian Olympic Committee
- Website: www.olympics.com.au

in Tokyo, Japan 23 July 2021 – 8 August 2021
- Competitors: 484 (225 men and 259 women) in 30 sports
- Flag bearers (opening): Cate Campbell; Patty Mills
- Flag bearer (closing): Mathew Belcher
- Officials: Ian Chesterman AM (chef de mission)
- Medals Ranked 6th: Gold 17 Silver 7 Bronze 22 Total 46

Summer Olympics appearances (overview)
- 1896; 1900; 1904; 1908; 1912; 1920; 1924; 1928; 1932; 1936; 1948; 1952; 1956; 1960; 1964; 1968; 1972; 1976; 1980; 1984; 1988; 1992; 1996; 2000; 2004; 2008; 2012; 2016; 2020; 2024; 2028

Other related appearances
- 1906 Intercalated Games –––– Australasia (1908–1912)

Australia competed at the 2020 Summer Olympics in Tokyo. Originally scheduled to take place from 24 July to 9 August 2020, the Games were postponed to 23 July to 8 August 2021, because of the COVID-19 pandemic. Australia is one of only five countries to have sent athletes to every Summer Olympics of the modern era, alongside Great Britain, France, Greece, and Switzerland.

Before the official postponement, the country initially withdrew from the Games over the coronavirus pandemic concerns. The executive board of the Australian Olympic Committee unanimously voted to tell their athletes to prepare for a postponed Games.

Two days before the opening ceremony, Australia was awarded the 2032 Summer Olympics in Brisbane; the games there open 23 July 2032.

Australia competed in all sports except baseball, fencing, handball and wrestling.

Australia left Tokyo with 46 medals winning 17 gold medals equalling their best total from Athens 2004 along with 7 silver and 22 bronze.

== Medalists ==
Medal	Name	Sport	Event	Date
Gold	Bronte Campbell; Cate Campbell; Meg Harris; Emma McKeon; Mollie O'Callaghan^{[a]} Madison Wilson^{[a]}	Swimming	Women's 4 × 100 m freestyle relay	25 July
Gold	Ariarne Titmus	Swimming	Women's 400 m freestyle	26 July
Gold	Kaylee McKeown	Swimming	Women's 100 m backstroke	27 July
Gold	Annabelle McIntyre; Jessica Morrison; Rosemary Popa; Lucy Stephan	Rowing	Women's coxless four	28 July
Gold	Jack Hargreaves; Alexander Hill; Alexander Purnell; Spencer Turrin	Rowing	Men's coxless four	28 July
Gold	Ariarne Titmus	Swimming	Women's 200 m freestyle	28 July
Gold	Zac Stubblety-Cook	Swimming	Men's 200 m breaststroke	29 July
Gold	Jessica Fox	Canoeing	Women's slalom C-1	29 July
Gold	Emma McKeon	Swimming	Women's 100 m freestyle	30 July
Gold	Kaylee McKeown	Swimming	Women's 200 m backstroke	31 July
Gold	Emma McKeon	Swimming	Women's 50 m freestyle	1 August
Gold	Cate Campbell; Chelsea Hodges; Kaylee McKeown; Emma McKeon; Mollie O'Callaghan^{[a]} Emily Seebohm^{[a]} Brianna Throssell^{[a]}	Swimming	Women's 4 × 100 m medley relay	1 August
Gold	Logan Martin	Cycling	BMX freestyle	1 August
Gold	Matthew Wearn	Sailing	Men's laser	1 August
Gold	Mathew Belcher; William Ryan	Sailing	Men's 470	4 August
Gold	Thomas Green; Jean van der Westhuyzen	Canoeing	Men's sprint K-2 1000 m	5 August
Gold	Keegan Palmer	Skateboarding	Men's park	5 August
Silver	Jack McLoughlin	Swimming	Men's 400 m freestyle	25 July
Silver	Kyle Chalmers	Swimming	Men's 100 m freestyle	29 July
Silver	Ariarne Titmus	Swimming	Women's 800 m freestyle	31 July
Silver	Andrew Hoy; Kevin McNab; Shane Rose	Equestrian	Team eventing	2 August
Silver	Australia men's national field hockey team: Lachlan Sharp; Tom Craig; Tom Wickham; Matt Dawson; Joshua Beltz; Eddie Ockenden; Jacob Whetton; Blake Govers; Dylan Martin; Joshua Simmonds; Tim Howard; Aran Zalewski; Flynn Ogilvie; Daniel Beale; Trent Mitton; Tim Brand; Andrew Charter; Jeremy Hayward	Field hockey	Men's tournament	5 August
Silver	Mariafe Artacho del Solar; Taliqua Clancy	Volleyball	Women's beach volleyball tournament	6 August
Silver	Nicola McDermott	Athletics	Women's high jump	7 August
Bronze	Brendon Smith	Swimming	Men's 400 m individual medley	25 July
Bronze	Emma McKeon	Swimming	Women's 100 m butterfly	26 July
Bronze	Kyle Chalmers; Alexander Graham; Zac Incerti; Cameron McEvoy^{[a]} Matthew Temple	Swimming	Men's 4 × 100 metre freestyle relay	26 July
Bronze	Owen Wright	Surfing	Men's shortboard	27 July
Bronze	Jessica Fox	Canoeing	Women's slalom K-1	27 July
Bronze	Caleb Antill; Jack Cleary; Cameron Girdlestone; Luke Letcher	Rowing	Men's quadruple sculls	28 July
Bronze	Caitlin Cronin; Harriet Hudson; Rowena Meredith; Ria Thompson	Rowing	Women's quadruple sculls	28 July
Bronze	Kyle Chalmers; Alexander Graham; Mack Horton^{[a]} Zac Incerti; Thomas Neill; Elijah Winnington^{[a]}	Swimming	Men's 4 × 200 metre freestyle relay	28 July
Bronze	Rohan Dennis	Cycling	Men's road time trial	28 July
Bronze	Tamsin Cook^{[a]} Meg Harris^{[a]} Emma McKeon; Leah Neale; Mollie O'Callaghan^{[a]} Brianna Throssell^{[a]} Ariarne Titmus; Madison Wilson	Swimming	Women's 4 × 200 metre freestyle relay	29 July
Bronze	Cate Campbell	Swimming	Women's 100 m freestyle	30 July
Bronze	Emily Seebohm	Swimming	Women's 200 m backstroke	31 July
Bronze	Bronte Campbell^{[a]} Isaac Cooper^{[a]} Emma McKeon; Kaylee McKeown; Zac Stubblety-Cook; Matthew Temple; Brianna Throssell^{[a]}	Swimming	Mixed 4 × 100 metre medley relay	31 July
Bronze	John Peers; Ashleigh Barty	Tennis	Mixed doubles	31 July
Bronze	Andrew Hoy	Equestrian	Individual eventing	2 August
Bronze	Kareena Lee	Swimming	Women's marathon 10km	4 August
Bronze	Leigh Howard; Kelland O'Brien; Luke Plapp; Alexander Porter; Sam Welsford	Cycling	Men's team pursuit	4 August
Bronze	Melissa Wu	Diving	Women's 10 metre platform	5 August
Bronze	Ashley Moloney	Athletics	Men's decathlon	5 August
Bronze	Harry Garside	Boxing	Men's lightweight	6 August
Bronze	Kelsey-Lee Barber	Athletics	Women's javelin throw	6 August
Bronze	Australia men's national basketball team: Chris Goulding; Patty Mills; Josh Green; Joe Ingles; Matthew Dellavedova; Nathan Sobey; Matisse Thybulle; Dante Exum; Aron Baynes; Jock Landale; Duop Reath; Nick Kay	Basketball	Men's tournament	7 August

Medals by sport
Sport	1st place, gold medalist(s)	2nd place, silver medalist(s)	3rd place, bronze medalist(s)	Total
Athletics	0	1	2	3
Basketball	0	0	1	1
Boxing	0	0	1	1
Canoeing	2	0	1	3
Cycling	1	0	2	3
Diving	0	0	1	1
Equestrian	0	1	1	2
Field hockey	0	1	0	1
Rowing	2	0	2	4
Sailing	2	0	0	2
Skateboarding	1	0	0	1
Surfing	0	0	1	1
Swimming	9	3	9	21
Tennis	0	0	1	1
Volleyball	0	1	0	1
Total	17	7	22	46

Medals by date
Date	1st place, gold medalist(s)	2nd place, silver medalist(s)	3rd place, bronze medalist(s)	Total
24 July	0	0	0	0
25 July	1	1	1	3
26 July	1	0	2	3
27 July	1	0	2	3
28 July	3	0	4	7
29 July	2	1	1	4
30 July	1	0	1	2
31 July	1	1	3	5
1 August	4	0	0	4
2 August	0	1	1	2
3 August	0	0	0	0
4 August	1	0	2	3
5 August	2	1	2	5
6 August	0	1	2	3
7 August	0	1	1	2
8 August	0	0	0	0
Total	17	7	22	46

Medals by gender
Gender	1st place, gold medalist(s)	2nd place, silver medalist(s)	3rd place, bronze medalist(s)	Total
Female	10	3	9	22
Male	7	4	11	22
Mixed	0	0	2	2
Total	17	7	22	46

Multiple medallists
Name	Sport	1st place, gold medalist(s)	2nd place, silver medalist(s)	3rd place, bronze medalist(s)	Total
Emma McKeon	Swimming	4	0	3	7
Kaylee McKeown	Swimming	3	0	1	4
Ariarne Titmus	Swimming	2	1	1	4
Cate Campbell	Swimming	2	0	1	3
Mollie O'Callaghan	Swimming	2	0	1	3
Brianna Throssell	Swimming	1	0	2	3
Kyle Chalmers	Swimming	0	1	2	3
Bronte Campbell	Swimming	1	0	1	2
Jessica Fox	Canoeing	1	0	1	2
Meg Harris	Swimming	1	0	1	2
Emily Seebohm	Swimming	1	0	1	2
Zac Stubblety-Cook	Swimming	1	0	1	2
Madison Wilson	Swimming	1	0	1	2
Andrew Hoy	Equestrian	0	1	1	2
Alexander Graham	Swimming	0	0	2	2
Zac Incerti	Swimming	0	0	2	2
Matthew Temple	Swimming	0	0	2	2

== Competitors ==
The following is the list of number of competitors in the Games.

Sport	Men	Women	Total
Archery	3	1	4
Artistic swimming	—N/a	8	8
Athletics	28	35	63
Badminton	1	3	4
Basketball	12	12	24
Boxing	3	2	5
Canoeing	8	9	17
Cycling	15	14	29
Diving	3	4	7
Equestrian	4	5	9
Field hockey	18	18	36
Football	22	22	44
Golf	2	2	4
Gymnastics	2	9	11
Judo	1	2	3
Karate	1	0	1
Modern pentathlon	1	1	2
Rowing	20	18	38
Rugby sevens	12	12	24
Sailing	7	6	13
Shooting	8	7	15
Skateboarding	3	2	5
Softball	—N/a	15	15
Sport climbing	1	1	2
Surfing	2	2	4
Swimming	18	19	37
Table tennis	3	3	6
Taekwondo	2	2	4
Tennis	5	5	10
Triathlon	3	3	6
Volleyball	2	2	4
Water polo	13	13	26
Weightlifting	2	3	5
Total	225	259	484

Injuries, mental health concerns, family reasons and positive COVID infections caused several officially selected athletes to withdraw and be replaced where possible. These include: Justis Huni (boxing), Nick Kyrgios (tennis), Alex de Minaur (tennis) replaced by Max Purcell, Liz Cambage (basketball) replaced by Sara Blicavs, Chris Burton replaced by Stuart Tinney (equestrian), Cameron Meyer replaced by Lucas Hamilton, Jack Haig replaced by Luke Durbridge (cycling), Marco Tilio replaced Ramy Najjarine and Jay Rich-Baghuelou replaced Ruon Tongyik (football), Penny Squibb (hockey) replaced Georgia Wilson, Henry Paterson (rugby 7's) replaced by Nathan Lawson and Dane Bird-Smith (athletics).

== Archery ==
Three Australian archers qualified for the men's events by reaching the quarterfinal stage of the men's team recurve at the 2019 World Archery Championships in 's-Hertogenbosch, Netherlands.

On 6 March 2020, Rio 2016 bronze medallists Ryan Tyack and Taylor Worth, with David Barnes making his Olympic comeback after his debut in Athens 2004, were officially named to the men's archery team for the Games, based on their individual results at the four-part selection trials.

Athlete	Event	Ranking round		Round of 64	Round of 32	Round of 16	Quarterfinals	Semifinals	Final / BM	
Athlete	Event	Score	Seed	Opposition Score	Opposition Score	Opposition Score	Opposition Score	Opposition Score	Opposition Score	Rank
David Barnes	Men's individual	648	50	Agatha (INA); L 1–7	Did not advance					
Ryan Tyack	Men's individual	650	42	D'Amour (ISV); W 6–5	Gazoz (TUR); L 3–7	Did not advance				
Taylor Worth	Men's individual	651	39	Prastyadi (INA); W 6–0	Wei Sx (CHN); W 6–4	Gazoz (TUR); L 1–7	Did not advance			
David Barnes; Ryan Tyack; Taylor Worth	Men's team	1949	11	—N/a		Chinese Taipei; L 4–5	Did not advance			
Alice Ingley	Women's individual	616	57	Perova (ROC); L 1–7	Did not advance					
Taylor Worth; Alice Ingley	Mixed team	1267	25	—N/a		did not advance				

== Artistic swimming ==
Australia fielded a squad of eight artistic swimmers to compete in the women's duet and team event through an Oceania continental selection in the team free routine at the 2019 FINA World Championships in Gwangju, South Korea. The artistic swimming squad, highlighted by Rio 2016 Olympians Hannah Cross, Emily Rogers, and Amie Thompson, were officially selected to the Australian roster for the Games on 26 February 2020. Initially set to compete in both duet and team events at the rescheduled Games, Rio 2016 Olympian Rose Stackpole officially announced her retirement from the sport in August 2020. Instead, rookie Hannah Burkhill was selected to complete the rest of the squad on 4 September 2020.

On 2 July 2021, Carolyn Rayna Buckle was announced as an inclusion to the team after the retirement of Hannah Cross.

Athlete	Event	Technical routine		Free routine (preliminary)			Free routine (final)		
Athlete	Event	Points	Rank	Points	Total (technical + free)	Rank	Points	Total (technical + free)	Rank
Emily Rogers; Amie Thompson	Duet	75.5343	20	76.3667	151.9010	20	Did not advance		
Carolyn Rayna Buckle; Hannah Burkhill; Kiera Gazzard; Alessandra Ho; Kirsten Kinash; Rachel Presser; Emily Rogers; Amie Thompson	Team	75.6351	9	—N/a			77.3667	153.0018	9

== Athletics ==
Australian athletes further achieved the entry standards, either by qualifying time or by world ranking, in the following track and field events (up to a maximum of three athletes in each event):

On 19 August 2020, national champions Stewart McSweyn and Jessica Hull in the long-distance running, race walkers Jemima Montag and Rio 2016 bronze medallist Dane Bird-Smith, and reigning world javelin throw champion Kelsey-Lee Barber were the first track and field athletes officially selected to the Australian squad for the rescheduled Games.

On 3 July 2021, the track and field team was officially finalised by Athletics Australia with a contingent of 63 athletes set to represent Australia. On 25 July, Dane Bird-Smith withdrew from the team in the 20 km Walk for personal reasons.

Key

- Note–Ranks given for track events are within the athlete's heat only
- Q = Qualified for the next round
- q = Qualified for the next round as a fastest loser or, in field events, by position without achieving the qualifying target
- NR = National record
- N/A = Round not applicable for the event
- Bye = Athlete not required to compete in round

Track & road events
Men

Athlete	Event	Heat		Quarterfinal		Semifinal		Final	
Athlete	Event	Time	Rank	Time	Rank	Time	Rank	Time	Rank
Rohan Browning	100 m	Bye		10.01 PB	1 Q	10.09	5	Did not advance	
Alex Beck	400 m	45.54 PB	6	—N/a		Did not advance			
Steven Solomon	400 m	44.94 PB	2 Q	—N/a		45.15	3	Did not advance	
Peter Bol	800 m	1:44.13 AR	2 Q	—N/a		1:44.11 AR	1 Q	1:45.92	4
Charlie Hunter	800 m	1:45.91	4 Q	—N/a		1:46.73	7	Did not advance	
Jeff Riseley	800 m	1:45.41	4 Q	—N/a		1:47.17	5	Did not advance	
Jye Edwards	1500 m	3:42.62	7	—N/a		Did not advance			
Olli Hoare	1500 m	3:36.09	3 Q	—N/a		3:34.35	4 Q	3:35.79	11
Stewart McSweyn	1500 m	3:36.39	3 Q	—N/a		3:32.54	5 Q	3:31.91	7
Morgan McDonald	5000 m	13:37.36	11	—N/a				Did not advance	
David McNeill	5000 m	13:39.95	8	—N/a				Did not advance	
Patrick Tiernan	5000 m	DNS		—N/a				Did not advance	
Patrick Tiernan	10000 m	—N/a						28:35.06 SB	19
Nicholas Hough	110 m hurdles	13.57	3 Q	—N/a		13.88	9	Did not advance	
Ben Buckingham	3000 m steeplechase	8:20.95 PB	7	—N/a				Did not advance	
Matthew Clarke	3000 m steeplechase	8:42.37	14	—N/a				Did not advance	
Edward Trippas	3000 m steeplechase	8:29.90	11	—N/a				Did not advance	
Liam Adams	Marathon	—N/a						2:15:51 SB	24
Jack Rayner	Marathon	—N/a						DNF	
Brett Robinson	Marathon	—N/a						2:24:04 SB	66
Kyle Swan	20 km walk	—N/a						1:27:55	36
Declan Tingay	20 km walk	—N/a						1:24:00 PB	17
Rhydian Cowley	50 km walk	—N/a						3:52:01 PB	8

Women

Athlete	Event	Heat		Quarterfinal		Semifinal		Final	
Athlete	Event	Time	Rank	Time	Rank	Time	Rank	Time	Rank
Hana Basic	100 m	Bye		11.32	5	Did not advance			
Riley Day	200 m	22.94	3 Q	—N/a		22.56 PB	4	Did not advance	
Bendere Oboya	400 m	52.37	5	—N/a		Did not advance			
Catriona Bisset	800 m	2:01.65	5	—N/a		Did not advance			
Morgan Mitchell	800 m	2:05.44	6	—N/a		Did not advance			
Georgia Griffith	1500 m	4:14.43	14	—N/a		Did not advance			
Linden Hall	1500 m	4:02.27	3 Q	—N/a		4:01.37	3 Q	3:59.01 PB	6
Jessica Hull	1500 m	4:05.28	2 Q	—N/a		3:58.81 AR	4 Q	4:02.63	11
Isobel Batt-Doyle	5000 m	15:21.65	15	—N/a				Did not advance	
Jenny Blundell	5000 m	15:11.27	11	—N/a				Did not advance	
Rose Davies	5000 m	15:50.07	18	—N/a				Did not advance	
Liz Clay	100 m hurdles	12.87	2 Q	—N/a		12.71 PB	3	Did not advance	
Sarah Carli	400 m hurdles	56.93	5	—N/a		Did not advance			
Amy Cashin	3000 m steeplechase	9:34.67	11	—N/a				Did not advance	
Genevieve Gregson	3000 m steeplechase	9:26.11	6 Q	—N/a				DNF	
Georgia Winkcup	3000 m steeplechase	9:59.29	13	—N/a				Did not advance	
Ellie Beer; Angeline Blackburn; Kendra Hubbard; Bendere Oboya; Anneliese Rubie-Renshaw	4 × 400 m relay	3:30.61	7	—N/a				Did not advance	
Sinead Diver	Marathon	—N/a						2:31:14 SB	10
Ellie Pashley	Marathon	—N/a						2:33:39 SB	23
Lisa Weightman	Marathon	—N/a						2:34:19 SB	26
Katie Hayward	20 km walk	—N/a						1:38:11	37
Rebecca Henderson	20 km walk	—N/a						1:38:21	38
Jemima Montag	20 km walk	—N/a						1:30:39	6

Field events
Men

Athlete	Event	Qualification		Final	
Athlete	Event	Result	Rank	Result	Rank
Henry Frayne	Long jump	7.93	14	Did not advance	
Brandon Starc	High jump	2.28	4 Q	2.35 SB	5
Kurtis Marschall	Pole vault	5.75	5 Q	NM	—
Matthew Denny	Discus throw	65.13	4 Q	67.02 PB	4

Women

Athlete	Event	Qualification		Final	
Athlete	Event	Result	Rank	Result	Rank
Brooke Stratton	Long jump	6.60	12 q	6.83	7
Nicola McDermott	High jump	1.95	=1 Q	2.02 AR	2nd place, silver medalist(s)
Eleanor Patterson	High jump	1.95	=4 Q	1.96	5
Nina Kennedy	Pole vault	4.40	22	Did not advance	
Liz Parnov	Pole vault	4.25	24	Did not advance	
Dani Stevens	Discus throw	58.77	22	Did not advance	
Kelsey-Lee Barber	Javelin throw	62.59 SB	2 q	64.56 SB	3rd place, bronze medalist(s)
Mackenzie Little	Javelin throw	62.37 PB	2 q	59.96	8
Kathryn Mitchell	Javelin throw	61.85	7 q	61.82	6

Combined events – Men's decathlon

Athlete	Event	100 m	LJ	SP	HJ	400 m	110H	DT	PV	JT	1500 m	Total	Rank
Cedric Dubler	Result	10.89	7.36	13.35	2.05	49.02	15.10	43.31	NM	58.52	5:03.69	7008	21
Cedric Dubler	Points	885	900	689	850	860	837	732	0	716	539	7008	21
Ashley Moloney	Result	10.34	7.64	14.49	2.11	46.29	14.08	44.38	5.10	57.12	4:39.19	8649	3rd place, bronze medalist(s)
Ashley Moloney	Points	1013	970	758	906	994	964	754	910	695	685	8649	3rd place, bronze medalist(s)

== Badminton ==
Australia entered four badminton players (one man and three women) into the Olympic tournament based on the BWF Race to Tokyo Rankings; one entry each in the women's singles and a pair in the women's and mixed doubles. Setyana Mapasa, Gronya Somerville and Simon Leung will be making their Olympic debut, while Chen Hsuan-yu will be making her second appearance after being selected into the 2016 Rio Olympic team.

Athlete	Event	Group stage				Elimination	Quarterfinal	Semifinal	Final / BM	
Athlete	Event	Opposition Score	Opposition Score	Opposition Score	Rank	Opposition Score	Opposition Score	Opposition Score	Opposition Score	Rank
Chen Hsuan-yu	Women's singles	Blichfeldt (DEN); L (7–21, 14–21)	Zechiri (BUL); W (21–16, 20–22, 21–8)	—N/a	2	Did not advance				
Setyana Mapasa; Gronya Somerville	Women's doubles	Lee S-h / Shin S-c (KOR); L (9–21, 6–21)	Du Y / Li Yh (CHN); L (9–21, 12–21)	Fruergaard / Thygesen (DEN); W (21–19, 13–21, 21–12)	3	—N/a	Did not advance			
Simon Leung; Gronya Somerville	Mixed doubles	Jordan / Oktavianti (INA); L (22–20, 17–21, 13–21)	Watanabe / Higashino (JPN); L (7–21, 15–21)	Christiansen / Bøje (DEN); L (16–21, 14–21)	4	—N/a	Did not advance			

== Basketball ==
Summary

Team	Event	Group stage				Quarterfinal	Semifinal	Final / BM	
Team	Event	Opposition Score	Opposition Score	Opposition Score	Rank	Opposition Score	Opposition Score	Opposition Score	Rank
Australia men's	Men's tournament	Nigeria; W 84–67	Italy; W 86–83	Germany; W 89–76	1	Argentina; W 97–59	United States; L 78–97	Slovenia; W 107–93	3rd place, bronze medalist(s)
Australia women's	Women's tournament	Belgium; L 70–85	China; L 74–76	Puerto Rico; W 96–69	3	United States; L 55–79	Did not advance		

=== Men's tournament ===
Australia men's basketball team qualified for the Olympics by advancing to the second round and securing an outright berth as the highest-ranked Oceania squad at the 2019 FIBA World Cup in China.

Team roster

The roster was announced on 2 July 2021.

Australia men's national basketball team – 2020 Tokyo Olympics roster
Players
Coaches

Pos.	No.	Name	Age – Date of birth	Height	Club	Ctr.
SG	4	Chris Goulding	32 – 24 October 1988	1.92 m (6 ft 4 in)	Melbourne United	(Australia)
G	5	Patty Mills	32 – 11 August 1988	1.83 m (6 ft 0 in)	San Antonio Spurs	(United States)
SG	6	Josh Green	20 – 26 November 2000	1.98 m (6 ft 6 in)	Dallas Mavericks	(United States)
SF	7	Joe Ingles	33 – 2 October 1987	2.04 m (6 ft 8 in)	Utah Jazz	(United States)
PG	8	Matthew Dellavedova	30 – 8 September 1990	1.91 m (6 ft 3 in)	Melbourne United	(Australia)
G	9	Nathan Sobey	31 – 14 July 1990	1.90 m (6 ft 3 in)	Brisbane Bullets	(Australia)
G/F	10	Matisse Thybulle	24 – 4 March 1997	1.96 m (6 ft 5 in)	Philadelphia 76ers	(United States)
G	11	Dante Exum	26 – 13 July 1995	1.93 m (6 ft 4 in)	Houston Rockets	(United States)
C	12	Aron Baynes	34 – 9 December 1986	2.07 m (6 ft 9 in)	Toronto Raptors	(Canada)
F/C	13	Jock Landale	25 – 25 October 1995	2.11 m (6 ft 11 in)	Melbourne United	(Australia)
F/C	14	Duop Reath	25 – 26 June 1996	2.11 m (6 ft 11 in)	Crvena Zvezda	(Serbia)
PF	15	Nick Kay	28 – 3 August 1992	2.06 m (6 ft 9 in)	Real Betis	(Spain)

Head coach

- (United States) Brian Goorjian

Assistant coach(es)

- (Australia) Matthew Nielsen
- (Australia) Adam Caporn
- (Australia) John Rillie

Legend

- Club – describes last
  club before the tournament
- Age – describes age
  on 25 July 2021

Group play

Pos	Team	Pld	W	L	PF	PA	PD	Pts	Qualification
1	Australia	3	3	0	259	226	+33	6	Quarterfinals
2	Italy	3	2	1	255	239	+16	5	Quarterfinals
3	Germany	3	1	2	257	273	−16	4	Quarterfinals
4	Nigeria	3	0	3	230	263	−33	3	

Source: TOCOG and FIBA
Rules for classification: 1) classification points; 2) head-to-head results; 3) head-to-head game points difference; 4) head-to-head number of game points scored.

25 July 2021
17:20
v

Boxscore

Australia	84–67	Nigeria
Scoring by quarter: 23–23, 20–17, 15–12, 26–15
Pts: Mills 25; Rebs: Kay 8 Asts: Mills 6		Pts: Emegano 12; Rebs: Achiuwa 6 Asts: Agada, Okogie 3

Saitama Super Arena, Saitama
Referees: Ademir Zurapović (BIH), Luis Castillo (ESP), Takaki Kato (JPN)

28 July 2021
17:20
v

Boxscore

Italy	83–86	Australia
Scoring by quarter: 25–25, 20–19, 17–21, 21–21
Pts: Fontecchio 22; Rebs: Polonara 7 Asts: Mannion 7		Pts: Landale 18; Rebs: three players 7 Asts: Ingles, Mills 5

Saitama Super Arena, Saitama
Referees: Michael Weiland (CAN), Steven Anderson (USA), Ahmed Al-Shuwaili (IRQ)

31 July 2021
17:20
v

Boxscore

Australia	89–76	Germany
Scoring by quarter: 18–22, 26–18, 22–19, 23–17
Pts: Mills 24; Rebs: Ingles 5 Asts: Mills 6		Pts: Obst 17; Rebs: Voigtmann 13; Asts: Lô 5

Saitama Super Arena, Saitama
Referees: Juan Fernández (ARG), Steven Anderson (USA), Omar Bermúdez (MEX)

Quarterfinal

3 August 2021
21:00
v

Boxscore

Australia	97–59	Argentina
Scoring by quarter: 18–22, 21–11, 21–15, 37–11
Pts: Mills 18; Rebs: Kay 10; Asts: Ingles 7		Pts: Laprovíttola 16; Rebs: Deck 10; Asts: Campazzo 5

Saitama Super Arena, Saitama
Referees: Antonio Conde (ESP), Aleksandar Glišić (SRB), Mārtiņš Kozlovskis (LAT)

Semifinal

5 August 2021
13:15
v

Boxscore

United States	97–78	Australia
Scoring by quarter: 18–24, 24–21, 32–10, 23–23
Pts: Durant 23; Rebs: Durant 9 Asts: Holiday 8		Pts: Mills 15; Rebs: Landale 6 Asts: Mills 8

Saitama Super Arena, Saitama
Referees: Ademir Zurapović (BIH), Michael Weiland (CAN), Manuel Mazzoni (ITA)

Bronze medal game

7 August 2021
20:00
v

Boxscore

Slovenia	93–107	Australia
Scoring by quarter: 19–20, 26–33, 22–25, 26–29
Pts: Dončić 22; Rebs: Dončić 8 Asts: Dončić 7		Pts: Mills 42; Rebs: Ingles 9 Asts: Mills 9

Saitama Super Arena, Saitama
Referees: Roberto Vázquez (PUR), Yohan Rosso (FRA), Matthew Kallio (CAN)

=== Women's tournament ===
Australia women's basketball team qualified for the Olympics as one of three highest-ranked eligible squads at the Bourges meet of the 2020 FIBA Women's Olympic Qualifying Tournament.

Team roster

The roster was announced on 26 May 2021. Liz Cambage withdrew before the tournament on 16 July 2021 and replaced by Sara Blicavs.

Australia women's national basketball team – 2020 Summer Olympics roster
Players
Coaches

Pos.	No.	Name	Age – Date of birth	Height	Club	Ctr.
G	4	Jenna O'Hea (C)	34 – 6 June 1987	1.86 m (6 ft 1 in)	Southside Flyers	(Australia)
G	5	Leilani Mitchell	36 – 15 June 1985	1.65 m (5 ft 5 in)	Washington Mystics	(United States)
SF	6	Stephanie Talbot	27 – 15 June 1994	1.88 m (6 ft 2 in)	Seattle Storm	(United States)
G	7	Tess Madgen	30 – 12 August 1990	1.80 m (5 ft 11 in)	Melbourne Boomers	(Australia)
PF	8	Sara Blicavs	28 – 15 February 1993	1.88 m (6 ft 2 in)	Southside Flyers	(Australia)
SF	9	Rebecca Allen	28 – 6 November 1992	1.88 m (6 ft 2 in)	New York Liberty	(United States)
G	10	Katie-Rae Ebzery	31 – 8 January 1990	1.78 m (5 ft 10 in)	Perth Lynx	(Australia)
F	11	Alanna Smith	24 – 10 September 1996	1.90 m (6 ft 3 in)	Phoenix Mercury	(United States)
PG	12	Tessa Lavey	28 – 29 March 1993	1.72 m (5 ft 8 in)	Bendigo Spirit	(Australia)
F	13	Ezi Magbegor	21 – 13 August 1999	1.93 m (6 ft 4 in)	Seattle Storm	(United States)
C	14	Marianna Tolo	32 – 2 July 1989	1.96 m (6 ft 5 in)	University of Canberra Capitals	(Australia)
F	15	Cayla George	32 – 1 May 1989	1.93 m (6 ft 4 in)	Melbourne Boomers	(Australia)

Head coach

- (Australia) Sandy Brondello

Assistant coach(es)

- (Australia) Paul Goriss
- (Germany) Olaf Lange

Legend

- (C) Team captain
- Club – describes last
  club before the tournament
- Age – describes age
  on 26 July 2021

Group play

Pos	Team	Pld	W	L	PF	PA	PD	Pts	Qualification
1	China	3	3	0	247	191	+56	6	Quarterfinals
2	Belgium	3	2	1	234	196	+38	5	Quarterfinals
3	Australia	3	1	2	240	230	+10	4	Quarterfinals
4	Puerto Rico	3	0	3	176	280	−104	3	

Source: TOCOG and FIBA
Rules for classification: 1) classification points; 2) head-to-head results; 3) head-to-head game points difference; 4) head-to-head number of game points scored.

27 July 2021
17:20
v

Boxscore

Australia	70–85	Belgium
Scoring by quarter: 17–21, 24–16, 16–19, 13–29
Pts: Magbegor 20; Rebs: George 10; Asts: Mitchell 7		Pts: Meesseman 32; Rebs: Meesseman 9 Asts: Allemand 11

Saitama Super Arena, Saitama
Referees: Juan Fernández (ARG), Amy Bonner (USA), Yener Yılmaz (TUR)

30 July 2021
21:00
v

Boxscore

China	76–74	Australia
Scoring by quarter: 27–19, 11–19, 17–9, 21–27
Pts: Wang 20; Rebs: Shao 8 Asts: Li M. 7		Pts: Magbegor 15; Rebs: George 5 Asts: Ebzery 4

Saitama Super Arena, Saitama
Referees: Matthew Kallio (CAN), Maj Forsberg (DEN), Ahmed Al-Shuwaili (IRQ)

2 August 2021
21:00
v

Boxscore

Australia	96–69	Puerto Rico
Scoring by quarter: 22–24, 23–20, 23–8, 28–17
Pts: Tolo 26; Rebs: Tolo 17; Asts: Mitchell 6		Pts: Gwathmey 26; Rebs: Gibson, Gwathmey 6 Asts: Meléndez, Rosado 3

Saitama Super Arena, Saitama
Referees: Alexander Glišić (SRB), Samir Abaakil (MAR), Gizella Györgyi (NOR)

Quarterfinal

4 August 2021
13:40
v

Boxscore

Australia	55–79	United States
Scoring by quarter: 12–26, 15–22, 12–20, 16–11
Pts: Mitchell 14; Rebs: Allen, George 7 Asts: Mitchell 6		Pts: Stewart 23; Rebs: Griner 8 Asts: Gray 8

Saitama Super Arena, Saitama
Referees: Ferdinand Pascual (PHI), Takaki Kato (JPN), Yevgeniy Mikheyev (KAZ)

== Boxing ==
Australia entered six boxers (four men and two women) into the Olympic tournament. 2019 world bronze medallist Justis Huni (men's heavyweight) and 2018 Commonwealth Games champion Skye Nicolson (women's featherweight), along with rookies Alex Winwood (men's flyweight), Paulo Aokuso (men's light heavyweight), and Caitlin Parker (women's middleweight), secured the spots on the Australian squad by advancing to the semifinal match of their respective weight divisions at the 2020 Asia & Oceania Qualification Tournament in Amman, Jordan. Harrison Garside completed the nation's boxing lineup by topping the list of eligible boxers from Asia and Oceania in the men's lightweight division of the IOC's Boxing Task Force Rankings. Justis Huni withdrew due to a hand injury after boxing Paul Gallen in June 2021.

Athlete	Event	Round of 32	Round of 16	Quarterfinals	Semifinals	Final	
Athlete	Event	Opposition Result	Opposition Result	Opposition Result	Opposition Result	Opposition Result	Rank
Alex Winwood	Men's flyweight	Chinyemba (ZAM); L 1–4	Did not advance				
Harry Garside	Men's lightweight	Ume (PNG); W 5–0	Jonas (NAM); W 5–0	Safiullin (KAZ); W 3–2	Cruz (CUB); L 0–5	Did not advance	3rd place, bronze medalist(s)
Paulo Aokuso	Men's light heavyweight	Bye	Jalidov (ESP); L 2–3	Did not advance			
Skye Nicolson	Women's featherweight	Bye	Im A-j (KOR); W 4–1	Artingstall (GBR); L 2–3	Did not advance		
Caitlin Parker	Women's middleweight	—N/a	Bylon (PAN); L 0–5	Did not advance			

== Canoeing ==
=== Slalom ===
Australian canoeists qualified one boat for each of the following classes through the 2019 ICF Canoe Slalom World Championships in La Seu d'Urgell, Spain and the 2020 Oceania Championships in Auckland, New Zealand. They must also compete at the Australian Open and in two trials of the Oceania Championships, both held in Penrith, New South Wales, to assure their selection to the nation's Olympic slalom canoeing team.

On 8 November 2019, multiple world and Olympic medallist Jessica Fox was officially selected to the Australian roster for her third consecutive Games, with Rio 2016 Olympian Lucien Delfour (men's K-1) and rookie Daniel Watkins (men's C-1) joining her three months later at the end of the selection trials.

Athlete	Event	Preliminary						Semifinal		Final	
Athlete	Event	Run 1	Rank	Run 2	Rank	Best	Rank	Time	Rank	Time	Rank
Daniel Watkins	Men's C-1	158.43	16	103.07	8	103.07	10 Q	101.28	2 Q	108.18	9
Lucien Delfour	Men's K-1	91.10	2	91.12	3	91.10	3 Q	97.52	6 Q	102.33	8
Jessica Fox	Women's C-1	109.96	2	110.93	5	109.96	5 Q	110.59	1 Q	105.04	1st place, gold medalist(s)
Jessica Fox	Women's K-1	104.05	2	98.46	1	98.46	1 Q	105.85	1 Q	106.73	3rd place, bronze medalist(s)

=== Sprint ===
Australian canoeists qualified a total of six boats in each of the following distances for the Games through the 2019 ICF Canoe Sprint World Championships in Szeged, Hungary and the 2020 Oceania Championships in Penrith, New South Wales.

At the end of the two-stage selection trials, fourteen sprint canoe and kayak paddlers were officially named to the Australian team on 27 March 2020, with London 2012 gold medallist Murray Stewart in the men's K-4 500 metres making his third consecutive trip to the Games.

Men

Athlete	Event	Heats		Quarterfinals		Semifinals		Final	
Athlete	Event	Time	Rank	Time	Rank	Time	Rank	Time	Rank
Thomas Green	K-1 1000 m	3:39.492	2 SF	Bye		3:24.612	3 FA	3:28.360	7
Jean van der Westhuyzen	K-1 1000 m	3:46.186	3 QF	3:46.104	1 SF	3:28.287	8 FB	3:26.955	11
Riley Fitzsimmons; Jordan Wood	K-2 1000 m	3:18.453	3 QF	3:10.619	1 SF	3:21.860	6 FB	3:24.757	13
Thomas Green; Jean van der Westhuyzen	K-2 1000 m	3:08.773	1 SF	Bye		3:17.077	1 FA	3:15.280	1st place, gold medalist(s)
Riley Fitzsimmons; Murray Stewart; Lachlan Tame; Jordan Wood	K-4 500 m	1:22.662	2 SF	—N/a		1:24.868	2 FA	1:25.025	6

Women

Athlete	Event	Heats		Quarterfinals		Semifinals		Final	
Athlete	Event	Time	Rank	Time	Rank	Time	Rank	Time	Rank
Josephine Bulmer	C-1 200 m	53.354	6 QF	51.474	7	did not advance			
Bernadette Wallace	C-1 200 m	48.209	5 QF	48.330	4	did not advance			
Josephine Bulmer; Bernadette Wallace	C-2 500 m	2:11.322	7 QF	2:11.180	5 FB	—N/a		2:05.698	13
Alyssa Bull	K-1 500 m	1:49.416	3 SF	Bye		1:54.038	4 FB	1:56.799	8
Alyce Wood	K-1 500 m	1:48.572	2 SF	Bye		1:53.079	2 FA	1:57.251	8
Jo Brigden-Jones; Jaime Roberts	K-2 500 m	1:52.097	5 QF	1:50.325	4 SF	1:42.092	8 FB	1:41.073	13
Alyssa Bull; Alyce Wood	K-2 500 m	1:45.499	3 QF	1:47.057	2 SF	1:37.109	2 FA	1:37.412	5
Jo Brigden-Jones; Catherine McArthur; Shannon Reynolds; Jaime Roberts	K-4 500 m	1:37.407	4 QF	1:37.601	5 SF	1:38.170	4 FA	1:39.797	7

Qualification Legend: FA = Qualify to final (medal); FB = Qualify to final B (non-medal); SF = Qualify to semifinal round; QF = Qualify to quarterfinal round

== Cycling ==
=== Road ===
Australia entered a squad of eight riders (four per gender) to compete in their respective Olympic road races, by virtue of their top 50 national finish (for men) and top 22 (for women) in the UCI World Ranking. Cameron Meyer later withdrew from the team.

The road cycling team was officially named on May 19, 2021, with two-time individual time trial world champion Rohan Dennis and dual world medallist Amanda Spratt returning to their third consecutive Games.

Men

Athlete	Event	Time	Rank
Luke Durbridge	Road race	6:21:46	72
Lucas Hamilton	Road race	6:21:46	71
Richie Porte	Road race	6:15:38	48
Rohan Dennis	Time trial	56:08.09	3rd place, bronze medalist(s)
Richie Porte	Time trial	1:00:53.67	27

Women

Athlete	Event	Time	Rank
Grace Brown	Road race	4:02.16	47
Tiffany Cromwell	Road race	3:55.41	26
Sarah Gigante	Road race	4:01.08	40
Amanda Spratt	Road race	Did not finish	
Grace Brown	Time trial	31:22.22	4
Sarah Gigante	Time trial	33:01.60	11

=== Track ===
Following the completion of the 2020 UCI Track Cycling World Championships, Australian riders accumulated spots for both men and women in team sprint, team pursuit, madison, and omnium based on their country's results in the final UCI Olympic rankings. As a result of their place in the men's and women's team sprint, Australia won its right to enter two riders in both men's and women's sprint and men's and women's keirin.

The full Australian track cycling squad was officially named on 19 March 2020, with Matthew Glaetzer (men's team sprint) and Annette Edmondson (women's team pursuit) riding for their third consecutive Games. Cameron Meyer withdrew on 5 July 2021 for personal reasons.

Sprint

Athlete	Event	Qualification		Round 1	Repechage 1	Round 2	Repechage 2	Round 3	Repechage 3	Quarterfinals	Semifinals	Finals / BM	
Athlete	Event	Time Speed (km/h)	Rank	Opposition Time Speed (km/h)	Opposition Time Speed (km/h)	Opposition Time Speed (km/h)	Opposition Time Speed (km/h)	Opposition Time Speed (km/h)	Opposition Time Speed (km/h)	Opposition Time Speed (km/h)	Opposition Time Speed (km/h)	Opposition Time Speed (km/h)	Rank
Nathan Hart	Men's sprint	9.696	22 Q	Carlin (GBR); L	Tjon En Fa (SUR); Xu C (CHN); L	Did not advance							
Matthew Richardson	Men's sprint	9.685	21 Q	Paul (TRI); L	Bötticher (GER); Helal (FRA); L	Did not advance							
Kaarle McCulloch	Women's sprint	10.679	14 Q	Andrews (NZL); L	Verdugo (MEX) du Preez (RSA); W 11.194; 64.320	Mitchell (CAN); L	Zhong Ts (CHN); L	Did not advance					

Team sprint

Athlete	Event	Qualification		Semifinals		Final	
Athlete	Event	Time Speed (km/h)	Rank	Opposition Time Speed (km/h)	Rank	Opposition Time Speed (km/h)	Rank
Matthew Glaetzer; Nathan Hart; Matthew Richardson	Men's team sprint	42.371; 63.723	3	ROC; W 42.103; 64.128	3 FB	France; W 44.013; 61.346	4

Qualification legend: FA=Gold medal final; FB=Bronze medal final

Pursuit

Athlete	Event	Qualification		Semifinals		Final	
Athlete	Event	Time	Rank	Opponent Results	Rank	Opponent Results	Rank
Leigh Howard; Kelland O'Brien; Luke Plapp; Alexander Porter; Sam Welsford	Men's team pursuit	3:48.448	5	Switzerland; 3:44.902	4	New Zealand; OVL	3rd place, bronze medalist(s)
Ashlee Ankudinoff; Georgia Baker; Annette Edmondson; Alexandra Manly; Maeve Plouffe	Women's team pursuit	4:13.571	7	New Zealand; 4:09.992	5	Italy; 4:11.041	5

Keirin

Athlete	Event	Round 1	Repechage	Quarterfinals	Semifinals	Final
Athlete	Event	Rank	Rank	Rank	Rank	Rank
Matthew Glaetzer	Men's keirin	3 R	1 Q	4 Q	2 FA	5
Matthew Richardson	Men's keirin	2 Q	Bye	5	Did not advance	
Kaarle McCulloch	Women's keirin	4 R	2 Q	2 Q	5 FB	9

Omnium

Athlete	Event	Scratch race		Tempo race		Elimination race		Points race		Total	
Athlete	Event	Rank	Points	Rank	Points	Rank	Points	Rank	Points	Rank	Points
Sam Welsford	Men's omnium	6	30	13	16	9	24	11	9	11	79
Annette Edmondson	Women's omnium	3	36	12	18	18	6	12	1	12	61

Madison

Athlete	Event	Points	Laps	Rank
Leigh Howard; Kelland O'Brien	Men's madison	DNF	–20	=12
Georgia Baker; Maeve Plouffe	Women's madison	9	0	7

=== Mountain biking ===
Australian mountain bikers qualified for one men's and one women's quota place each into the Olympic cross-country race, as a result of the top-two finish vying for the men's qualification under the elite category at the 2019 UCI World Championships in Mont-Sainte-Anne, Canada, and the nation's twenty-first-place finish for women, respectively, in the UCI Olympic Ranking List of 16 May 2021.

Athlete	Event	Time	Rank
Daniel McConnell	Men's cross-country	1:33:12	30
Rebecca McConnell	Women's cross-country	1:30:29	28

=== BMX ===
Australian riders qualified for three quota place (one men and two women) for BMX at the Olympics, as a result of the nation's sixth-place finish for men and fifth for women in the UCI BMX Olympic Qualification Ranking List of 1 June 2021.

Racing

Athlete	Event	Quarterfinal		Semifinal		Final	
Athlete	Event	Points	Rank	Points	Rank	Time	Rank
Anthony Dean	Men's	16	6	Did not advance			
Lauren Reynolds	Women's	8	3 Q	12	4 Q	45.401	5
Saya Sakakibara	Women's	11	4 Q	14	5	Did not advance	

Freestyle

Athlete	Event	Seeding				Final		
Athlete	Event	Run 1	Run 2	Average	Rank	Run 1	Run 2	Rank
Logan Martin	Men's	91.90	90.04	90.97	1	93.30	41.40	1st place, gold medalist(s)
Natalya Diehm	Women's	77.40	79.00	78.20	5	86.00	80.50	5

== Diving ==
Australian divers qualified for the following individual spots at the Games through the 2019 FINA World Championships and 2019 Oceania Championships. They must compete at the 2020 Australian Open Championships to assure their selection to the Olympic team.

Athlete	Event	Preliminary		Semifinal		Final	
Athlete	Event	Points	Rank	Points	Rank	Points	Rank
Li Shixin	Men's 3 m springboard	320.35	27	Did not advance			
Sam Fricker	Men's 10 m platform	306.50	28	Did not advance			
Cassiel Rousseau	Men's 10 m platform	423.55	8 Q	444.10	6 Q	430.35	8
Esther Qin	Women's 3 m springboard	292.80	9 Q	309.15	8 Q	261.95	12
Anabelle Smith	Women's 3 m springboard	275.02	18 Q	285.60	14	Did not advance	
Nikita Hains	Women's 10 m platform	270.00	21	Did not advance			
Melissa Wu	Women's 10 m platform	351.20	4 Q	334.50	5 Q	371.40	3rd place, bronze medalist(s)

== Equestrian ==
Australian equestrians qualified a full squad in the team dressage competition by receiving a spare berth freed up by host nation Japan, as the top-ranked nation from Southeast Asia and Oceania, not yet qualified, at the 2018 FEI World Equestrian Games in Tryon, North Carolina, United States. Additionally, the country's eventing and show jumping teams qualified for the Games by virtue of a top-six finish each in the same tournament.

The Australian equestrian teams for dressage and eventing were unveiled on June 25, 2021. At age 66, Mary Hanna is set to become the oldest Australian Olympian on record. The jumping team was named on June 30, 2021.

=== Dressage ===
Athlete	Horse	Event	Grand Prix		Grand Prix Special		Grand Prix Freestyle		Total	
Athlete	Horse	Event	Score	Rank	Score	Rank	Technical	Artistic	Score	Rank
Mary Hanna	Calanta	Individual	67.981	40	—N/a		Did not advance			
Kelly Layne	Samhitas	Individual	58.354	57	—N/a		Did not advance			
Simone Pearce	Destano	Individual	68.494	36	—N/a		Did not advance			
Mary Hanna; Kelly Layne; Simone Pearce	See above	Team	6273.5	13	Did not advance		—N/a		Did not advance	

Qualification Legend: Q = Qualified for the final; q = Qualified for the final as a lucky loser

=== Eventing ===
Stuart Tinney and Leporis have been named the team alternates. Originally-selected Chris Burton later withdrew, causing Tinney to step in, and granting Kevin McNab and Don Quidam to become the new traveling alternates. McNab later replaced Tinney shortly prior to the competition.

Athlete	Horse	Event	Dressage		Cross-country			Jumping						Total	
Athlete	Horse	Event	Dressage		Cross-country			Qualifier			Final			Total	
Athlete	Horse	Event	Penalties	Rank	Penalties	Total	Rank	Penalties	Total	Rank	Penalties	Total	Rank	Penalties	Rank
Andrew Hoy	Vassily de Lassos	Individual	29.60	13	0.00	29.60	7	0.00	29.60	4	0.00	29.60	3	29.60	3rd place, bronze medalist(s)
Shane Rose	Virgil	Individual	31.70	24	0.00	31.70	9	4.00	35.70	12	4.00	39.70	10	39.70	10
Kevin McNab	Don Quidam	Individual	32.10	25	2.80	34.90	15	0.00	34.90	11	12.00	46.90	14	46.90	14
Andrew Hoy; Kevin McNab; Shane Rose	See above	Team	93.40	6	2.80	96.20	2	4.00	100.20	2	—N/a			100.20	2nd place, silver medalist(s)

=== Jumping ===
Rowan Willis and Blue Movie were named the team alternates but withdrew on 8 July. On 21 July, Jamie Kermond was removed as part of the Jumping team after testing positive for the use of cocaine, in a recreational capacity, from a sample given in an out of competition test conducted on 26 June. On 23 July Katie Laurie and Edwina Tops-Alexander were confirmed as Individual competitors.

Athlete	Horse	Event	Qualification		Final		
Athlete	Horse	Event	Penalties	Rank	Penalties	Time	Rank
Katie Laurie	Casebrooke Lomond	Individual	Retired		Did not advance		
Edwina Tops-Alexander	Identity Vitsereol	Individual	4	31	Did not advance		

== Field hockey ==
Summary

Key:

- FT – After full-time.
- P – Match decided by penalty-shootout.

Team	Event	Group stage						Quarterfinal	Semifinal	Final / BM	
Team	Event	Opposition Score	Opposition Score	Opposition Score	Opposition Score	Opposition Score	Rank	Opposition Score	Opposition Score	Opposition Score	Rank
Australia men's	Men's tournament	Japan; W 5–3	India; W 7–1	Argentina; W 5–2	New Zealand; W 4–2	Spain; D 1–1	1	Netherlands; W 2–2 (p.s.o.: 3–0)	Germany; W 3–1	Belgium; L 1–1 (p.s.o.: 2–3)	2nd place, silver medalist(s)
Australia women's	Women's tournament	Spain; W 3–1	China; W 6–0	Japan; W 1–0	New Zealand; W 1–0	Argentina; W 2–0	1	India; L 0–1	Did not advance		

=== Men's tournament ===
Australia men's national field hockey team qualified for the Olympics by beating New Zealand with a unanimous 3–0 for a gold-medal victory at the 2019 Oceania Cup in Rockhampton, Queensland.

Team roster

The squad was announced on 14 June 2021.

Head coach: Colin Batch

No.	Pos.	Player	Date of birth (age)	Caps	Goals	Club
1	MF	Lachlan Sharp	2 July 1997 (aged 24)	54	11	(Australia) NSW Pride
2	MF	Tom Craig	3 September 1995 (aged 25)	101	29	(Australia) NSW Pride
5	FW	Tom Wickham	26 May 1990 (aged 31)	59	27	(Australia) Perth Thundersticks
6	DF	Matt Dawson	27 April 1994 (aged 27)	146	12	(Australia) NSW Pride
10	MF	Joshua Beltz	24 April 1995 (aged 26)	46	3	(Australia) Tassie Tigers
11	DF	Eddie Ockenden (Captain)	3 April 1987 (aged 34)	372	71	(Australia) Tassie Tigers
12	MF	Jacob Whetton	15 June 1991 (aged 30)	209	65	(Australia) Brisbane Blaze
13	FW	Blake Govers	6 July 1996 (aged 25)	103	89	(Australia) NSW Pride
14	DF	Dylan Martin	12 January 1998 (aged 23)	6	0	(Australia) NSW Pride
15	DF	Joshua Simmonds	4 October 1995 (aged 25)	24	1	(Australia) HC Melbourne
16	DF	Tim Howard	23 June 1996 (aged 25)	66	1	(Australia) Brisbane Blaze
17	MF	Aran Zalewski (Captain)	21 March 1991 (aged 30)	193	25	(Australia) Perth Thundersticks
22	MF	Flynn Ogilvie	17 September 1993 (aged 27)	115	22	(Australia) NSW Pride
23	MF	Daniel Beale	12 February 1993 (aged 28)	183	28	(Australia) Brisbane Blaze
25	FW	Trent Mitton	26 November 1990 (aged 30)	177	82	(Australia) Perth Thundersticks
29	FW	Tim Brand	29 November 1998 (aged 22)	45	18	(Australia) NSW Pride
30	GK	Andrew Charter	30 March 1987 (aged 34)	185	0	(Australia) Canberra Chill
32	DF	Jeremy Hayward	3 March 1993 (aged 28)	162	70	(Australia) Tassie Tigers

Group play

Pos	Team	Pld	W	D	L	GF	GA	GD	Pts	Qualification
1	Australia	5	4	1	0	22	9	+13	13	Quarter-finals
2	India	5	4	0	1	15	13	+2	12	Quarter-finals
3	Argentina	5	2	1	2	10	11	−1	7	Quarter-finals
4	Spain	5	1	2	2	9	10	−1	5	Quarter-finals
5	New Zealand	5	1	1	3	11	16	−5	4	
6	Japan (H)	5	0	1	4	10	18	−8	1	

Source: Tokyo 2020 and FIH
Rules for classification: 1) points; 2) matches won; 3) goal difference; 4) goals for; 5) head-to-head result; 6) field goals scored.
(H) Hosts

24 July 2021
09:30
v

Japan	3–5	Australia
Ke. Tanaka 22', 27'; Kirishita 26'	Report	Brand 11'; Craig 14'; Govers 31'; Zalewski 38'; Beale 50'

North Pitch
Umpires:
Jakub Mejzlík (CZE)
Lim Hong-Zhen (SGP)

25 July 2021
18:30
v

India	1–7	Australia
Dilpreet 34'	Report	Beale 10'; Hayward 21'; Ogilvie 23'; Beltz 26'; Govers 40', 42'; Brand 51'

North Pitch
Umpires:
Ben Göntgen (GER)
Marcin Grochal (POL)

27 July 2021
09:30
v

Argentina	2–5	Australia
Tolini 4'; Casella 55'	Report	Govers 15', 23'; Wickham 21'; Sharp 25'; Hayward 39'

North Pitch
Umpires:
Martin Madden (GBR)
Coen van Bunge (NED)

28 July 2021
21:15
v

Australia	4–2	New Zealand
Brand 9', 50'; Govers 55'; Wickham 57'	Report	Russell 13', 58'

South Pitch
Umpires:
Francisco Vázquez (ESP)
Marcin Grochal (POL)

30 July 2021
10:00
v

Australia	1–1	Spain
Wickham 18'	Report	Quemada 60'

South Pitch
Umpires:
Javed Shaikh (IND)
Jakub Mejzlík (CZE)

Quarterfinal

1 August 2021
12:00
v

Australia	2–2	Netherlands
Wickham 13', 38'	Report	Van der Weerden 32'; Hertzberger 50'
Penalties
Govers (penalty shoot-out scored); Ogilvie (penalty shoot-out scored); Brand (penalty shoot-out scored)	3–0	(penalty shoot-out missed) Hertzberger; (penalty shoot-out missed) Kemperman; (penalty shoot-out missed) De Geus

Umpires:
Ben Göntgen (GER)
Germán Montes de Oca (ARG)

Semifinal

3 August 2021
19:00
v

Australia	3–1	Germany
Brand 7'; Govers 27'; Sharp 59'	Report	Windfeder 11'

Umpires:
Germán Montes de Oca (ARG)
Marcin Grochal (POL)

Gold medal game

5 August 2021
19:00
v

(silver) Australia	1–1	Belgium (gold)
Wickham 47'	Report	Van Aubel 32'
Penalties
Govers (penalty shoot-out missed); Ogilvie (penalty shoot-out scored); Brand (penalty shoot-out scored); Simmonds (penalty shoot-out missed); Whetton (penalty shoot-out missed)	2–3	(penalty shoot-out scored) Van Aubel; (penalty shoot-out scored) De Sloover; (penalty shoot-out missed) Denayer; (penalty shoot-out scored) Hendrickx

Umpires:
Coen van Bunge (NED)
Marcin Grochal (POL)

=== Women's tournament ===
Australia women's national field hockey team qualified for the Olympics by securing one of the seven tickets available and defeating Russia in a playoff at the Perth leg of the 2019 FIH Olympic Qualifiers.

Team roster

The squad was announced on 14 June 2021.

Head coach: Katrina Powell

No.	Pos.	Player	Date of birth (age)	Caps	Goals	Club
2	FW	Ambrosia Malone	8 January 1998 (aged 23)	56	15	(Australia) Brisbane Blaze
3	FW	Brooke Peris	16 January 1993 (aged 28)	176	26	(Australia) Canberra Chill
4	MF	Amy Lawton	19 January 2002 (aged 19)	19	3	(Australia) HC Melbourne
8	MF	Georgia Wilson	20 May 1996 (aged 25)	43	0	(Australia) Perth Thundersticks
10	DF	Madison Fitzpatrick	14 December 1996 (aged 24)	80	17	(Australia) Queensland Scorchers
12	MF	Greta Hayes	17 October 1996 (aged 24)	14	0	(Australia) NSW Arrows
13	DF	Edwina Bone	29 April 1988 (aged 33)	206	5	(Australia) Canberra Chill
14	MF	Stephanie Kershaw	19 April 1995 (aged 26)	69	9	(Australia) Brisbane Blaze
15	DF	Kaitlin Nobbs	24 September 1997 (aged 23)	86	4	(Australia) NSW Pride
18	MF	Jane Claxton	26 October 1992 (aged 28)	186	18	(Australia) Adelaide Fire
20	DF	Karri Somerville	7 April 1999 (aged 22)	7	0	(Australia) Perth Thundersticks
21	MF	Renee Taylor	28 September 1996 (aged 24)	87	8	(Australia) Brisbane Blaze
22	DF	Kate Jenner	5 May 1990 (aged 31)	132	1	(Australia) NSW Pride
24	FW	Mariah Williams	31 May 1995 (aged 26)	88	17	(Australia) NSW Pride
26	FW	Emily Chalker	28 July 1992 (aged 28)	249	84	(Australia) NSW Pride
27	GK	Rachael Lynch	2 July 1986 (aged 35)	227	0	(Australia) HC Melbourne
30	FW	Grace Stewart	28 April 1997 (aged 24)	86	25	(Australia) NSW Pride
32	FW	Savannah Fitzpatrick	4 February 1995 (aged 26)	66	16	(Australia) Brisbane Blaze

Group play

Pos	Team	Pld	W	D	L	GF	GA	GD	Pts	Qualification
1	Australia	5	5	0	0	13	1	+12	15	Quarterfinals
2	Spain	5	3	0	2	9	8	+1	9	Quarterfinals
3	Argentina	5	3	0	2	8	8	0	9	Quarterfinals
4	New Zealand	5	2	0	3	8	7	+1	6	Quarterfinals
5	China	5	2	0	3	9	16	−7	6	
6	Japan (H)	5	0	0	5	6	13	−7	0	

Source: Tokyo 2020 and FIH
Rules for classification: 1) points; 2) matches won; 3) goal difference; 4) goals for; 5) head-to-head result; 6) field goals scored.
(H) Hosts

25 July 2021
10:00
v

Australia	3–1	Spain
Malone 31'; Chalker 32'; Stewart 37'	Report	Pérez 33'

South Pitch
Umpires:
Michelle Joubert (RSA)
Annelize Rostron (RSA)

26 July 2021
12:15
v

Australia	6–0	China
Chalker 16', 22'; Peris 31'; Malone 54'; Kershaw 56'; Stewart 58'	Report

South Pitch
Umpires:
Amber Church (NZL)
Laurine Delforge (BEL)

28 July 2021
18:30
v

Japan	0–1	Australia
	Report	M. Fitzpatrick 33'

North Pitch
Umpires:
Maggie Giddens (USA)
Liu Xiaoying (CHN)

29 July 2021
21:15
v

New Zealand	0–1	Australia
	Report	Chalker 34'

South Pitch
Umpires:
Sarah Wilson (GBR)
Laurine Delforge (BEL)

31 July 2021
11:45
v

Argentina	0–2	Australia
	Report	S. Fitzpatrick 49'; Chalker 59'

North Pitch
Umpires:
Michelle Meister (GER)
Michelle Joubert (RSA)

Quarterfinal

2 August 2021
12:00
v

Australia	0–1	India
	Report	Gurjit 22'

Umpires:
Carolina de la Fuente (ARG)
Irene Presenqui (ARG)

== Football ==
Summary

Key:

- W – Win L – Lose D – Draw
- A.E.T. – After extra time.
- P – Match decided by penalty-shootout.

Team	Event	Group stage				Quarterfinal	Semifinal	Final / BM	
Team	Event	Opposition Score	Opposition Score	Opposition Score	Rank	Opposition Score	Opposition Score	Opposition Score	Rank
Australia men's	Men's tournament	Argentina; W 2–0	Spain; L 0–1	Egypt; L 0–2	4	Did not advance			
Australia women's	Women's tournament	New Zealand; W 2–1	Sweden; L 2–4	United States; D 0–0	3 Q	Great Britain; W 4–3 (a.e.t.)	Sweden; L 0–1	United States; L 3–4	4

=== Men's tournament ===
For the first time in twelve years, Australia men's football team qualified for the Games by winning the bronze medal and securing the last of three available berths of the 2020 AFC U-23 Championship in Thailand.

Team roster

Australia's squad was named on 29 June 2021. On 5 July 2021, it was announced that Marco Tilio replaced Ramy Najjarine and Jay Rich-Baghuelou replaced Ruon Tongyik.

Head coach: Graham Arnold

No.	Pos.	Player	Date of birth (age)	Caps	Goals	Club
1	GK	Tom Glover	24 December 1997 (aged 23)	10	0	(Football Australia) Melbourne City
2	DF	Nathaniel Atkinson	13 June 1999 (aged 22)	5	0	(Football Australia) Melbourne City
3	DF	Kye Rowles	24 June 1998 (aged 23)	3	0	(Football Australia) Central Coast Mariners
4	DF	Jay Rich-Baghuelou	22 October 1999 (aged 21)	5	0	(The Football Association) Crystal Palace
5	DF	Harry Souttar	22 October 1998 (aged 22)	4	0	(The Football Association) Stoke City
6	MF	Keanu Baccus	7 June 1998 (aged 23)	15	0	(Football Australia) Western Sydney Wanderers
7	FW	Reno Piscopo	27 May 1998 (aged 23)	13	2	(New Zealand Football) Wellington Phoenix
8	MF	Riley McGree	2 November 1998 (aged 22)	11	3	(The Football Association) Birmingham City
9	FW	Nicholas D'Agostino	25 February 1998 (aged 23)	9	5	(Football Australia) Perth Glory
10	MF	Denis Genreau	21 May 1999 (aged 22)	8	0	(Football Australia) Macarthur FC
11	FW	Daniel Arzani	4 January 1999 (aged 22)	6	3	(Danish Football Association) AGF
12	FW	Mitchell Duke*	18 January 1991 (aged 30)	2	1	(Football Australia) Western Sydney Wanderers
13	FW	Dylan Pierias	20 February 2000 (aged 21)	1	0	(Football Australia) Western United
14	DF	Thomas Deng (captain)	20 March 1997 (aged 24)	12	1	(Japan Football Association) Urawa Red Diamonds
15	MF	Caleb Watts	16 January 2002 (aged 19)	5	0	(The Football Association) Southampton
16	DF	Joel King	30 October 2000 (aged 20)	1	0	(Football Australia) Sydney FC
17	MF	Connor Metcalfe	5 November 1999 (aged 21)	6	0	(Football Australia) Melbourne City
18	GK	Ashley Maynard-Brewer	25 June 1999 (aged 22)	3	0	(The Football Association) Charlton Athletic
19	FW	Marco Tilio	23 August 2001 (aged 19)	2	0	(Football Australia) Melbourne City
20	FW	Lachlan Wales	19 October 1997 (aged 23)	6	1	(Football Australia) Western United
21	MF	Cameron Devlin	7 June 1998 (aged 23)	2	0	(New Zealand Football) Wellington Phoenix
22	GK	Jordan Holmes	8 May 1997 (aged 24)	5	0	(The Football Association) Ebbsfleet United

* Overage player.

Group play

Pos	Team	Pld	W	D	L	GF	GA	GD	Pts	Qualification
1	Spain	3	1	2	0	2	1	+1	5	Advance to knockout stage
2	Egypt	3	1	1	1	2	1	+1	4	Advance to knockout stage
3	Argentina	3	1	1	1	2	3	−1	4	
4	Australia	3	1	0	2	2	3	−1	3	

Source: TOCOG and FIFA
Rules for classification: Group stage tiebreakers
22 July 2021
19:30

Argentina	0–2	Australia
	Report (TOCOG); Report (FIFA)	Wales 14'; Tilio 80'

Sapporo Dome, Sapporo
Referee: Srđan Jovanović (Serbia)

25 July 2021
19:30

Australia	0–1	Spain
	Report (TOCOG); Report (FIFA)	Oyarzabal 81'

Sapporo Dome, Sapporo
Referee: Bamlak Tessema Weyesa (Ethiopia)

28 July 2021
20:00

Australia	0–2	Egypt
	Report (TOCOG); Report (FIFA)	Rayyan 44'; A. Hamdy 85'

Miyagi Stadium, Rifu
Attendance: 4,471
Referee: Artur Soares Dias (Portugal)

=== Women's tournament ===
Australia women's football team qualified for the Games by defeating Vietnam in a two-legged playoff of the 2020 AFC Olympic Qualifying Tournament.

Team roster

The following 22 athletes were named on 30 June 2021.

Head coach: (Sweden) Tony Gustavsson

No.	Pos.	Player	Date of birth (age)	Caps	Goals	Club
1	GK	Lydia Williams	13 May 1988 (aged 33)	89	0	(The Football Association) Arsenal
2	FW	Sam Kerr (captain)	10 September 1993 (aged 27)	92	42	(The Football Association) Chelsea
3	MF	Kyra Cooney-Cross	15 February 2002 (aged 19)	2	0	(Football Australia) Melbourne Victory
4	DF	Clare Polkinghorne	1 February 1989 (aged 32)	128	11	(Swedish Football Association) Vittsjö GIK
5	MF	Aivi Luik	18 March 1985 (aged 36)	29	0	(Royal Spanish Football Federation) Sevilla
6	MF	Chloe Logarzo	22 December 1994 (aged 26)	48	8	(United States Soccer Federation) Kansas City
7	DF	Steph Catley	26 January 1994 (aged 27)	84	3	(The Football Association) Arsenal
8	MF	Elise Kellond-Knight	10 August 1990 (aged 30)	113	2	(Swedish Football Association) Hammarby IF
9	FW	Caitlin Foord	11 November 1994 (aged 26)	86	20	(The Football Association) Arsenal
10	MF	Emily van Egmond	12 July 1993 (aged 28)	101	23	(The Football Association) West Ham United
11	MF	Mary Fowler	14 February 2003 (aged 18)	8	1	(French Football Federation) Montpellier
12	DF	Ellie Carpenter	28 April 2000 (aged 21)	44	1	(French Football Federation) Lyon
13	MF	Tameka Yallop	16 June 1991 (aged 30)	89	10	(Football Australia) Brisbane Roar
14	DF	Alanna Kennedy	21 January 1995 (aged 26)	91	7	(The Football Association) Tottenham Hotspur
15	FW	Emily Gielnik	13 May 1992 (aged 29)	41	10	(Swedish Football Association) Vittsjö GIK
16	FW	Hayley Raso	5 September 1994 (aged 26)	50	6	(The Football Association) Everton
17	FW	Kyah Simon	25 June 1991 (aged 30)	94	26	(Royal Dutch Football Association) PSV
18	GK	Teagan Micah	20 October 1997 (aged 23)	1	0	(Norwegian Football Federation) Sandviken
19	DF	Courtney Nevin	12 February 2002 (aged 19)	2	0	(Football Australia) Western Sydney Wanderers
20	DF	Charlotte Grant	20 September 2001 (aged 19)	0	0	(Swedish Football Association) FC Rosengård
21	DF	Laura Brock	28 November 1989 (aged 31)	63	2	(French Football Federation) EA de Guingamp
22	GK	Mackenzie Arnold	25 February 1994 (aged 27)	26	0	(The Football Association) West Ham United

Group play

Pos	Team	Pld	W	D	L	GF	GA	GD	Pts	Qualification
1	Sweden	3	3	0	0	9	2	+7	9	Advance to knockout stage
2	United States	3	1	1	1	6	4	+2	4	Advance to knockout stage
3	Australia	3	1	1	1	4	5	−1	4	Advance to knockout stage
4	New Zealand	3	0	0	3	2	10	−8	0	

Source: TOCOG and FIFA
Rules for classification: Group stage tiebreakers
21 July 2021
20:30

Australia	2–1	New Zealand
Yallop 20'; Kerr 33'	Report (TOCOG); Report (FIFA)	Rennie 90+1'

Tokyo Stadium, Chōfu
Attendance: 0
Referee: Lucila Venegas (Mexico)

24 July 2021
17:30

Sweden	4–2	Australia
Rolfö 20', 63'; Hurtig 52'; Blackstenius 82'	Report (TOCOG); Report (FIFA)	Kerr 36', 48'

Saitama Stadium 2002, Saitama
Attendance: 0
Referee: Edina Alves Batista (Brazil)

27 July 2021
17:00

United States	0–0	Australia
	Report (TOCOG); Report (FIFA)

Kashima Stadium, Kashima
Attendance: 0
Referee: Anastasia Pustovoitova (Russia)

Quarterfinal

30 July 2021
18:00

Great Britain	3–4 (a.e.t.)	Australia
White 57', 66', 115'	Report (TOCOG); Report (FIFA)	Kennedy 35'; Kerr 89', 106'; Fowler 103'

Kashima Stadium, Kashima
Attendance: 0
Referee: Salima Mukansanga (Rwanda)

Semifinal

2 August 2021
20:00

Australia	0–1	Sweden
	Report (TOCOG); Report (FIFA)	Rolfö 46'

International Stadium Yokohama, Yokohama
Attendance: 0
Referee: Melissa Borjas (Honduras)

Bronze medal match

5 August 2021
17:00

Australia	3–4	United States
Kerr 17'; Foord 54'; Gielnik 90'	Report (TOCOG); Report (FIFA)	Rapinoe 8', 21'; Lloyd 45+1', 51'

Kashima Stadium, Kashima
Attendance: 0
Referee: Laura Fortunato (Argentina)

== Golf ==
Australia entered two male and two female golfers into the Olympic tournament. Adam Scott qualified for the men's event but chose not to play.

Athlete	Event	Round 1	Round 2	Round 3	Round 4	Total		
Athlete	Event	Score	Score	Score	Score	Score	Par	Rank
Marc Leishman	Men's	70	71	72	69	282	−2	=51
Cameron Smith	Men's	71	67	66	66	270	−14	=10
Hannah Green	Women's	71	65	67	68	271	−13	=5
Minjee Lee	Women's	71	68	73	68	280	−4	=29

== Gymnastics ==
=== Artistic ===
Australia entered two artistic gymnasts into the Olympic competition. American-based Tyson Bull secured one of the two places available for individual-based gymnasts, neither part of the team nor qualified through the all-around, in the horizontal bar exercise, while two additional berths were awarded to the Australian female gymnasts, who participated in the women's individual all-around and apparatus events at the 2019 World Championships in Stuttgart, Germany and at the 2021 Oceania Championships in Gold Coast, Queensland.

Men

Athlete	Event	Qualification								Final							
Athlete	Event	Apparatus						Total	Rank	Apparatus						Total	Rank
Athlete	Event	F	PH	R	V	PB	HB	Total	Rank	F	PH	R	V	PB	HB	Total	Rank
Tyson Bull	Horizontal bar	—N/a					14.433	14.433	7 Q	—N/a					12.566	12.566	5
Tyson Bull	Parallel bars	—N/a				13.566	—N/a	13.566	54	Did not advance							

Women

Athlete	Event	Qualification						Final					
Athlete	Event	Apparatus				Total	Rank	Apparatus				Total	Rank
Athlete	Event	V	UB	BB	F	Total	Rank	V	UB	BB	F	Total	Rank
Georgia Godwin	All-around	13.766	13.033	12.900	13.166	52.865	37	Did not advance					
Emily Whitehead	All-around	14.000	13.066	12.666	12.566	52.298	44	Did not advance					

=== Rhythmic ===
Australia fielded a squad of rhythmic gymnasts to compete at the Olympics, by winning the gold each in the individual and group all-around at the 2021 Oceania Championships in Gold Coast, Queensland.

Individual

Athlete	Event	Qualification						Final					
Athlete	Event	Hoop	Ball	Clubs	Ribbon	Total	Rank	Hoop	Ball	Clubs	Ribbon	Total	Rank
Lidiia Iakovleva	Individual	20.600	19.800	22.325	16.050	78.775	23	Did not advance					

Team

Athlete	Event	Qualification				Final			
Athlete	Event	5 apps	3+2 apps	Total	Rank	5 apps.	3+2 apps	Total	Rank
Emily Abbot; Alexandra Aristoteli; Alannah Mathews; Himeka Onoda; Felicity White	Group	20.850	19.500	40.350	14	Did not advance			

=== Trampoline ===
Australia qualified one gymnast each for the men's and women's trampoline by winning the gold at the 2021 Oceania Championships in Gold Coast.

Athlete	Event	Qualification		Final	
Athlete	Event	Score	Rank	Score	Rank
Dominic Clarke	Men's	111.680	4 Q	24.955	8
Jessica Pickering	Women's	34.190	16	Did not advance	

== Judo ==
Athlete	Event	Round of 32	Round of 16	Quarterfinals	Semifinals	Repechage	Final / BM	
Athlete	Event	Opposition Result	Opposition Result	Opposition Result	Opposition Result	Opposition Result	Opposition Result	Rank
Nathan Katz	Men's −66 kg	Postigos (PER); W 10–00	Shmailov (ISR); L 00–01	Did not advance				
Katharina Haecker	Women's −63 kg	Sharir (ISR); W 10–00	Franssen (NED); L 00–10	Did not advance				
Aoife Coughlan	Women's −70 kg	Biribo (KIR); W 10–01	Scoccimarro (GER); L 00–10	Did not advance				

== Karate ==
Australia entered one karateka into the inaugural Olympic tournament. Tsuneari Yahiro will be competing in men's kumite 75 kg, after World Karate Federation give him continental representation quotas.

Kumite

Athlete	Event	Group stage					Semifinals	Final	
Athlete	Event	Opposition Result	Opposition Result	Opposition Result	Opposition Result	Rank	Opposition Result	Opposition Result	Rank
Tsuneari Yahiro	Men's −75 kg	Azhikanov (KAZ); L 3–6	Busà (ITA); L 0–5	Aghayev (AZE); L 0–5	Bitsch (GER); L 3–5	5	Did not advance		

== Modern pentathlon ==
Australia qualified two modern pentathletes for the Games. London 2012 Olympian Ed Fernon and Nanjing 2014 Youth Olympian Marina Carrier, who eventually received a berth forfeited by New Zealand, secured their selection as Oceania's top-ranked modern pentathletes at the 2019 Asia & Oceania Championships in Kunming, China.

Athlete	Event	Fencing (épée one touch)				Swimming (200 m freestyle)			Riding (show jumping)			Combined: shooting/running (10 m air pistol)/(3200 m)			Total points	Final rank
Athlete	Event	RR	BR	Rank	MP points	Time	Rank	MP points	Penalties	Rank	MP points	Time	Rank	MP Points	Total points	Final rank
Ed Fernon	Men's	9–26	3	31	157	2:10.85	36	289	12	12	288	12:05.89	33	575	1309	31
Marina Carrier	Women's	18–17	0	=15	208	2:17.35	=25	276	4	3	296	13:43.86	34	377	1157	27

== Rowing ==
Australia qualified nine boats for each of the following rowing classes into the Olympic regatta, with the majority of crews confirming Olympic places for their boats at the 2019 FISA World Championships in Ottensheim, Austria. Meanwhile, the women's quadruple sculls boat was awarded to the Australian roster with a top-two finish at the 2021 FISA Final Qualification Regatta in Lucerne, Switzerland.

Men

Athlete	Event	Heats		Repechage		Semifinals		Final	
Athlete	Event	Time	Rank	Time	Rank	Time	Rank	Time	Rank
Sam Hardy; Joshua Hicks	Pair	6:42.74	1 SA/B	Bye		6:19.30	4 FB	6:30.20	10
Caleb Antill; Jack Cleary; Cameron Girdlestone; Luke Letcher	Quadruple sculls	5:41.45	2 FA	Bye		—N/a		5:33.97	3rd place, bronze medalist(s)
Jack Hargreaves; Alexander Hill; Alexander Purnell; Spencer Turrin	Four	5:54.27	1 FA	Bye		—N/a		5:42.76 OR	1st place, gold medalist(s)
Josh Booth; Angus Dawson; Simon Keenan; Nicholas Lavery; Timothy Masters; Jack O'Brien; Nicholas Purnell; Stuart Sim (cox); Angus Widdicombe	Eight	5:43.66	4 R	5:25.06	4 FA	—N/a		5:36.23	6

Women

Athlete	Event	Heats		Repechage		Semifinals		Final	
Athlete	Event	Time	Rank	Time	Rank	Time	Rank	Time	Rank
Annabelle McIntyre; Jessica Morrison	Pair	7:21.75	1 SA/B	Bye		6:49.82	4 FB	6:56.46	7
Amanda Bateman; Tara Rigney	Double sculls	6:53.30	3 SA/B	Bye		7:15.25	5 FB	6:57.71	7
Caitlin Cronin; Harriet Hudson; Rowena Meredith; Ria Thompson	Quadruple sculls	6:26.21	4 R	6:36.67	1 FA	—N/a		6:12.08	3rd place, bronze medalist(s)
Annabelle McIntyre; Jessica Morrison; Rosemary Popa; Lucy Stephan	Four	6:28.76 OR	1 FA	Bye		—N/a		6:15.37 OR	1st place, gold medalist(s)
Olympia Aldersey; Bronwyn Cox; Molly Goodman; Sarah Hawe; Genevieve Horton; Giorgia Patten; James Rook (cox); Georgina Rowe; Katrina Werry	Eight	6:18.95	3 R	5:57.15	4 FA	—N/a		6:03.92	5

Qualification Legend: FA=Final A (medal); FB=Final B (non-medal); FC=Final C (non-medal); FD=Final D (non-medal); FE=Final E (non-medal); FF=Final F (non-medal); SA/B=Semifinals A/B; SC/D=Semifinals C/D; SE/F=Semifinals E/F; QF=Quarterfinals; R=Repechage

== Rugby sevens ==
Summary

Team	Event	Pool round				Quarterfinal	Semifinal	Final / BM	
Team	Event	Opposition Result	Opposition Result	Opposition Result	Rank	Opposition Result	Opposition Result	Opposition Result	Rank
Australia men's	Men's tournament	Argentina; L (19–29)	South Korea; W (42–5)	New Zealand; L (12–14)	3 Q	Fiji; L (0–19)	Did not advance	Canada; W (29–7)	7
Australia women's	Women's tournament	Japan; W (48–0)	China; W (26–10)	United States; L (12–14)	2 Q	Fiji; L (12–14)	Did not advance	United States; W (17–7)	5

=== Men's tournament ===
Australia national rugby sevens team qualified for the Olympics by securing an outright berth with a gold-medal victory at the 2019 Oceania Sevens Championships in Suva, Fiji.

Team roster

Australia's 12-man squad plus one alternate was named on 6 July 2021. Nathan Lawson replaced Henry Paterson due to injury on 18 July 2021.

Head coach: Tim Walsh

No.	Pos.	Player	Date of birth (age)	Events	Points
1	BK	Henry Hutchison	12 February 1997 (aged 24)	32	435
2	BK	Samu Kerevi	27 September 1993 (aged 27)	0	0
3	FW	Nathan Lawson	23 January 1999 (aged 22)	0	0
4	BK	Dietrich Roache	6 July 2001 (aged 20)	0	0
5	BK	Lachie Miller	14 August 1994 (aged 26)	12	85
6	FW	Joe Pincus	24 July 1996 (aged 25)	12	100
7	BK	Josh Turner	23 September 1995 (aged 25)	6	70
8	FW	Dylan Pietsch	23 April 1998 (aged 23)	18	115
9	BK	Josh Coward	8 June 1997 (aged 24)	7	114
10	FW	Nick Malouf (c)	19 March 1993 (aged 28)	40	275
11	BK	Maurice Longbottom	30 January 1995 (aged 26)	20	333
12	FW	Lachie Anderson	27 August 1997 (aged 23)	27	320
13	BK	Lewis Holland	14 January 1993 (aged 28)	53	864

Group play

Pos	Team	Pld	W	D	L	PF	PA	PD	Pts	Qualification
1	New Zealand	3	3	0	0	99	31	+68	9	Quarter-finals
2	Argentina	3	2	0	1	99	54	+45	7	Quarter-finals
3	Australia	3	1	0	2	73	48	+25	5	Quarter-finals
4	South Korea	3	0	0	3	10	148	−138	3	

Source: Tokyo 2020 and World Rugby
Rules for classification: 1) Points; 2) Head-to-head result; 3) Point difference; 4) Points scored.

26 July 2021
10:30

Australia	19–29	Argentina
Try: Turner (2) 9' m, 12' c Kerevi 13' c Con: Longbottom (2/3) 12', 13'	(Tokyo 2020)	Try: Cinti 1' m Osadczuk 4' m Moneta 5' c Mendy 7' c Bazán 14' m Con: Mare (2/4) 6', 7'; Bazán (0/1)

Tokyo Stadium, Tokyo
Attendance: 0
Referee: Paulo Duarte (Portugal)

26 July 2021
18:00

Australia	42–5	South Korea
Try: Longbottom 1' c Roache 2' c Miller (2) 7' c, 8' c Malouf 10' c Pietsch 13' c Con: Longbottom (4/4) 1', 2', 7', 10'; Miller (1/1) 8'; Coward (1/1) 13'	(Tokyo 2020)	Try: Coquillard 9' m Con: Coquillard (0/1)

Tokyo Stadium, Tokyo
Attendance: 0
Referee: Nehuén Jauri Rivero (Argentina)

27 July 2021
10:30

New Zealand	14–12	Australia
Try: Collier 8' c Knewstubb 10' c Con: Knewstubb (2/2) 8', 10'	(Tokyo 2020)	Try: Kerevi 1' c Malouf 5' m Con: Holland (1/2) 1'

Tokyo Stadium, Tokyo
Attendance: 0
Referee: Sam Grove-White (Scotland)

=== Women's tournament ===
Australia women's national rugby sevens team qualified for the Olympics by finishing among the top four and securing an outright berth at the 2018–19 World Rugby Women's Sevens Series.

Team roster

- Women's team event – 1 team of 12 players

Group play

Pos	Team	Pld	W	D	L	PF	PA	PD	Pts	Qualification
1	United States	3	3	0	0	59	33	+26	9	Quarter-finals
2	Australia	3	2	0	1	86	24	+62	7	Quarter-finals
3	China	3	1	0	2	53	54	−1	5	Quarter-finals
4	Japan (H)	3	0	0	3	7	94	−87	3	

Source: Tokyo 2020 and World Rugby
Rules for classification: 1) Points; 2) Head-to-head result; 3) Point difference; 4) Points scored.
(H) Hosts

== Sailing ==
Australian sailors qualified one boat in each of the following classes through the 2018 Sailing World Championships, the class-associated Worlds, and the continental regattas.

On 20 September 2019, the Australian Olympic Committee announced the first set of sailors selected for Tokyo 2020, namely Rio 2016 silver medallists and defending world 470 champions Mathew Belcher and William Ryan and world's current top-ranked Laser sailor Matthew Wearn. The skiff crews (49er and 49erFX), highlighted by Ryan's sister and fellow Rio 2016 Olympian Jaime Ryan, were named to the sailing team on 27 February 2020, while Nacra 17 cousins Jason Waterhouse and Lisa Darmanin were set to defend their Rio 2016 podium finish at the Enoshima regatta, after being selected four days later. Laser Radial sailor Mara Stransky joined the sailing roster on 19 March 2020, followed by the women's 470 crew (Nia Jerwood & Monique de Vries) over a year later. Finn yachtsman and Rio 2016 Olympian Jake Lilley rounded out the sailing selection for the rescheduled Games on 21 April 2021.

Men

Athlete	Event	Race													Total	
Athlete	Event	1	2	3	4	5	6	7	8	9	10	11	12	M*	Net points	Rank
Matthew Wearn	Laser	17	~~28~~	2	4	2	2	1	1	12	8	—N/a		4	53	1st place, gold medalist(s)
Jake Lilley	Finn	10	8	4	11	7	9	~~15~~	6	2	6	—N/a		6	69	7
Mathew Belcher; William Ryan	470	2	5	1	1	4	3	2	1	2	~~8~~	—N/a		2	23	1st place, gold medalist(s)
Sam Phillips; William Phillips	49er	7	4	1	8	11	15	16	~~UFD~~	18	14	8	9	EL	111	12

Women

Athlete	Event	Race													Total	
Athlete	Event	1	2	3	4	5	6	7	8	9	10	11	12	M*	Net points	Rank
Mara Stransky	Laser Radial	12	26	19	10	19	16	~~BFD~~	24	3	1	—N/a		EL	130	14
Monique de Vries; Nia Jerwood	470	7	12	12	8	18	19	15	13	13	~~20~~	—N/a		EL	117	16
Tess Lloyd; Jaime Ryan	49er FX	9	11	7	9	11	10	15	10	~~19~~	11	8	8	EL	109	13

Mixed

Athlete	Event	Race													Total	
Athlete	Event	1	2	3	4	5	6	7	8	9	10	11	12	M*	Net points	Rank
Jason Waterhouse; Lisa Darmanin	Nacra 17	2	~~11~~	4	4	7	8	1	5	4	6	5	8	18	72	5

M = Medal race; EL = Eliminated – did not advance into the medal race

== Shooting ==
Australian shooters achieved quota places for the following events by virtue of their best finishes at the 2018 ISSF World Championships, the 2019 ISSF World Cup series, and Oceania Championships, as long as they obtained a minimum qualifying score (MQS) by 31 May 2020.

On 17 April 2020, the Australian Olympic Committee officially announced a roster of fifteen shooters selected for the rescheduled Olympics, with pistol ace Daniel Repacholi leading them to his remarkable fifth Games, Kazakh import Dina Aspandiyarova to her fourth, and rifle marksman Dane Sampson to his third.

Men

Athlete	Event	Qualification		Final	
Athlete	Event	Points	Rank	Points	Rank
Paul Adams	Skeet	119	21	Did not advance	
Sergei Evglevski	25 m rapid fire pistol	572	17	Did not advance	
Thomas Grice	Trap	119	25	Did not advance	
Alex Hoberg	10 m air rifle	625.6	21	Did not advance	
Daniel Repacholi	10 m air pistol	568	30	Did not advance	
Jack Rossiter	50 m rifle 3 positions	1160	29	Did not advance	
Dane Sampson	10 m air rifle	623.5	30	Did not advance	
Dane Sampson	50 m rifle 3 positions	1162	27	Did not advance	
James Willett	Trap	120	21	Did not advance	

Women

Athlete	Event	Qualification		Final	
Athlete	Event	Points	Rank	Points	Rank
Dina Aspandiyarova	10 m air pistol	558	46	Did not advance	
Laura Coles	Skeet	112	25	Did not advance	
Elise Collier	10 m air rifle	618.2	42	Did not advance	
Elena Galiabovitch	10 m air pistol	569	27	Did not advance	
Elena Galiabovitch	25 m pistol	583	11	Did not advance	
Katarina Kowplos	10 m air rifle	617.2	45	Did not advance	
Katarina Kowplos	50 m rifle 3 positions	1137	36	Did not advance	
Laetisha Scanlan	Trap	121	4 Q	26	4
Penny Smith	Trap	120	5 Q	13	6

Mixed

Athlete	Event	Qualification		Semifinal		Final / BM	
Athlete	Event	Points	Rank	Points	Rank	Points	Rank
Alex Hoberg; Elise Collier	10 m air rifle team	623.6	19	Did not advance			
Dane Sampson; Katarina Kowplos	10 m air rifle team	623.1	22	Did not advance			
Daniel Repacholi; Dina Aspandiyarova	10 m air pistol team	576	6 Q	380	8	Did not advance	
Thomas Grice; Penny Smith	Trap team	145	6	—N/a		Did not advance	
James Willett; Laetisha Scanlan	Trap team	145	7	—N/a		Did not advance	

== Skateboarding ==
Australia qualified three skateboarder in men's and women's park events at the Games based on the Olympic World Skateboarding Rankings List of 30 June 2021.

Athlete	Event	Heat		Final	
Athlete	Event	Score	Rank	Score	Rank
Keegan Palmer	Men's park	77.00	5	95.83	1st place, gold medalist(s)
Kieran Woolley	Men's park	82.69	2	82.04	5
Shane O'Neill	Men's street	19.52	16	Did not advance	
Poppy Starr Olsen	Women's park	44.03	6	46.04	5
Hayley Wilson	Women's street	5.34	16	Did not advance	

== Softball ==
Australia women's softball team qualified for the Olympics by winning the gold medal and securing a lone outright berth at the final match of the WBSC Women's Softball Qualifying Event for Asia and Oceania in Shanghai, China.

Summary

Legend: W – Win L – Lose D – Draw

Team	Event	Round robin						Final / BM	
Team	Event	Opposition Result	Opposition Result	Opposition Result	Opposition Result	Opposition Result	Rank	Opposition Result	Rank
Australia women's	Women's tournament	Japan; L 1–8	Italy; W 1–0	Canada; L 1–7	United States; L 1–2	Mexico; L 1–4	5	Did not advance	

Team roster

The roster was released on 1 July 2021.

Softball at the 2020 Summer Olympics – Australia roster
Players		Coaches
Pitchers: 6 Ellen Roberts; 14 Tarni Stepto; 32 Kaia Parnaby; 54 Gabrielle Plain	Catchers: 22 Belinda White; 25 Chelsea Forkin; 65 Taylah Tsitsikronis; Infielders: 2 Clare Warwick; 4 Stacey McManus; 16 Stacey Porter; 31 Rachel Lack; 44 Leah Parry; Outfielders: 1 Jade Wall; 17 Leigh Godfrey; 47 Michelle Cox	Manager: Laing Harrow; Coaches: Nathan Jones; Andrew Kirkpatrick

Group play

Pos	Team	Pld	W	L	RF	RA	RD	PCT	GB	Qualification
1	United States	5	5	0	9	2	+7	1.000	—	Gold medal match
2	Japan (H)	5	4	1	18	5	+13	.800	1	Gold medal match
3	Canada	5	3	2	19	4	+15	.600	2	Bronze medal match
4	Mexico	5	2	3	11	10	+1	.400	3	Bronze medal match
5	Australia	5	1	4	5	21	−16	.200	4	
6	Italy	5	0	5	1	21	−20	.000	5	

Source: Tokyo 2020 and WBSC
(H) Hosts

21 July 08:55 (JST) Fukushima Azuma Baseball Stadium 31 °C (88 °F)
Team	1	2	3	4	5	6	7	R	H	E
Australia	1	0	0	0	0	X	X	1	2	2
Japan (5)	1	0	2	3	2	X	X	8	6	0
WP: Yukiko Ueno (1–0) LP: Kaia Parnaby (0–1); Home runs: AUS: None; JPN: Minori Naito (1), Yamato Fujita (1), Yu Yamamoto (1); Boxscore

22 July 15:00 (JST) Fukushima Azuma Baseball Stadium 31 °C (88 °F)
Team	1	2	3	4	5	6	7	R	H	E
Italy	0	0	0	0	0	0	0	0	4	0
Australia	0	1	0	0	0	0	X	1	4	0
WP: Kaia Parnaby (1–1) LP: Greta Cecchetti (0–2) Sv: Ellen Roberts (1); Boxscore

24 July 10:00 (JST) Yokohama Stadium 29 °C (84 °F)
Team	1	2	3	4	5	6	7	R	H	E
Australia	1	0	0	0	0	0	0	1	6	2
Canada	3	3	0	1	0	0	X	7	8	0
WP: Jenna Caira (1–1) LP: Ellen Roberts (0–1); Boxscore

25 July 10:00 (JST) Yokohama Stadium 32 °C (90 °F)
Team	1	2	3	4	5	6	7	8	R	H	E
Australia	0	0	0	0	0	0	0	1	1	3	0
United States (8)	0	0	0	0	0	0	0	2	2	5	0
WP: Monica Abbott (2–0) LP: Tarni Stepto (0–1); Boxscore

26 July 20:00 (JST) Yokohama Stadium 27 °C (81 °F)
Team	1	2	3	4	5	6	7	R	H	E
Mexico	0	2	0	2	0	0	0	4	11	0
Australia	0	0	0	0	0	1	0	1	5	0
WP: Dallas Escobedo (2–2) LP: Kaia Parnaby (1–2); Home runs: MEX: None; AUS: Jade Wall (1); Boxscore

== Sport climbing ==
Australia entered two sport climbers into the Olympic tournament. Tom O'Halloran and Oceania Mackenzie qualified directly for the women's and men's combined events respectively, by advancing to the final stage and eventually winning the gold medal at the 2020 IFSC Oceania Championships in Sydney.

Athlete	Event	Qualification									Final								
Athlete	Event	Speed		Boulder		Lead			Total	Rank	Speed		Boulder		Lead			Total	Rank
Athlete	Event	Best	Place	Result	Place	Hold	Time	Place	Total	Rank	Best	Place	Result	Place	Hold	Time	Place	Total	Rank
Tom O'Halloran	Men's	7.34	17	0T0z 0 0	19.5	25	3:58	19	6298.50	20	Did not advance								
Oceana Mackenzie	Women's	8.83	13	1T2z 3 2	12	15+	–	16	2496.00	19	Did not advance								

== Surfing ==
Australia sent four surfers (two per gender) to compete in their respective shortboard races at the Games. Julian Wilson, Owen Wright, Sally Fitzgibbons, and Stephanie Gilmore finished within the top ten (for men) and top eight (for women), respectively, of those eligible for qualification in the World Surf League rankings to secure their places on the Australian roster for Tokyo 2020.

Athlete	Event	Round 1		Round 2		Round 3	Quarterfinal	Semifinal	Final / BM	
Athlete	Event	Score	Rank	Score	Rank	Opposition Result	Opposition Result	Opposition Result	Opposition Result	Rank
Julian Wilson	Men's shortboard	8.77	4 q	11.27	3 Q	Medina (BRA); L (13.00–14.33)	Did not advance			
Owen Wright	Men's shortboard	10.40	1 Q	Bye		Florès (FRA); W (15.00–12.90)	Messinas (PER); W (12.74–7.83)	Ferreira (BRA); L (12.47–13.17)	Medina (BRA); W (11.97–11.77)	3rd place, bronze medalist(s)
Sally Fitzgibbons	Women's shortboard	12.50	1 Q	Bye		Ado (FRA); W (10.86–9.03)	Tsuzuki (JPN); L (11.67–13.27)	Did not advance		
Stephanie Gilmore	Women's shortboard	14.50	1 Q	Bye		Buitendag (RSA); L (10.00–13.93)	Did not advance			

Qualification Legend: Q= Qualified directly for the third round; q = Qualified for the second round

== Swimming ==
Australian swimmers further achieved qualifying standards in the following events (up to a maximum of 2 swimmers in each event at the Olympic Qualifying Time (OQT), and potentially 1 at the Olympic Selection Time (OST)): To assure their nomination to the Olympic team, swimmers must finish in the top two of each individual pool event under both the benchmark standard and the FINA A-cut at the 2021 Australian Championships and Olympic Trials (12 to 17 June) in Adelaide.

Men

Athlete	Event	Heat		Semifinal		Final	
Athlete	Event	Time	Rank	Time	Rank	Time	Rank
Kyle Chalmers	100 m freestyle	47.77	3 Q	47.80	6 Q	47.08	2nd place, silver medalist(s)
Isaac Cooper	100 m backstroke	53.73	13 Q	53.43	12	Did not advance	
Kai Edwards	10 km open water	—N/a				1:53:04.0	12
Tristan Hollard	200 m backstroke	1:57.24	10 Q	1:56.92	10	Did not advance	
Mitch Larkin	100 m backstroke	52.97	4 Q	52.76	3 Q	52.79	7
Mitch Larkin	200 m individual medley	1:57.50	9 Q	1:57.80	10	Did not advance	
Se-Bom Lee	400 m individual medley	4:15.76	16	—N/a		Did not advance	
Cameron McEvoy	50 m freestyle	22.31	29	Did not advance			
Cameron McEvoy	100 m freestyle	48.72	24	Did not advance			
Jack McLoughlin	400 m freestyle	3:45.20	=4 Q	—N/a		3:43.52	2nd place, silver medalist(s)
Jack McLoughlin	800 m freestyle	7:46.94	6 Q	—N/a		7:45.00	5
Jack McLoughlin	1500 m freestyle	14:56.98	10	—N/a		Did not advance	
David Morgan	100 m butterfly	52.31	30	Did not advance			
David Morgan	200 m butterfly	2:00.27	35	Did not advance			
Thomas Neill	200 m freestyle	1:45.81	8 Q	1:45.74	9	Did not advance	
Thomas Neill	1500 m freestyle	15:04.65	16	—N/a		Did not advance	
Brendon Smith	200 m individual medley	1:58.57	22	Did not advance			
Brendon Smith	400 m individual medley	4:09.27	1 Q	—N/a		4:10.38	3rd place, bronze medalist(s)
Zac Stubblety-Cook	100 m breaststroke	1:00.05	24	Did not advance			
Zac Stubblety-Cook	200 m breaststroke	2:07.37	=1 Q	2:07.35	1 Q	2:06.38 OR	1st place, gold medalist(s)
Matthew Temple	100 m butterfly	51.39	8 Q	51.12	6 Q	50.92	=5
Matthew Temple	200 m butterfly	1:56.25	18	Did not advance			
Matthew Wilson	100 m breaststroke	1:00.03	22	Did not advance			
Matthew Wilson	200 m breaststroke	2:09.29	10 Q	2:10.10	14	Did not advance	
Elijah Winnington	200 m freestyle	1:46.99	22	Did not advance			
Elijah Winnington	400 m freestyle	3:45.20	=4 Q	—N/a		3:45.20	7
Kyle Chalmers; Alexander Graham; Zac Incerti; Cameron McEvoy^{[a]} Matthew Temple	4 × 100 m freestyle relay	3:11.89	3 Q	—N/a		3:10.22	3rd place, bronze medalist(s)
Kyle Chalmers; Alexander Graham; Mack Horton^{[a]} Zac Incerti; Thomas Neill; Elijah Winnington^{[a]}	4 × 200 m freestyle relay	7:05.00	2 Q	—N/a		7:01.84	3rd place, bronze medalist(s)
Kyle Chalmers; Mitch Larkin; David Morgan^{[a]} Zac Stubblety-Cook; Matthew Temple	4 × 100 m medley relay	3:32.08	6 Q	—N/a		3:29.60	5

Women

Athlete	Event	Heat		Semifinal		Final	
Athlete	Event	Time	Rank	Time	Rank	Time	Rank
Cate Campbell	50 m freestyle	24.15	3 Q	24.27	6 Q	24.36	7
Cate Campbell	100 m freestyle	52.80	4 Q	52.71	3 Q	52.52	3rd place, bronze medalist(s)
Tamsin Cook	400 m freestyle	4:04.80	9	—N/a		Did not advance	
Maddy Gough	1500 m freestyle	15:56.81	7 Q	—N/a		16:05.81	8
Jessica Hansen	100 m breaststroke	1:07.50	20	Did not advance			
Abbey Harkin	200 m breaststroke	2:24.41	17	Did not advance			
Chelsea Hodges	100 m breaststroke	1:06.70	12 Q	1:06.60	9	Did not advance	
Kareena Lee	10 km open water	—N/a				1:59:32.5	3rd place, bronze medalist(s)
Emma McKeon	50 m freestyle	24.02 OR	1 Q	24.00 OR	1 Q	23.81 OR	1st place, gold medalist(s)
Emma McKeon	100 m freestyle	52.13 OR	1 Q	52.32	1 Q	51.96 OR	1st place, gold medalist(s)
Emma McKeon	100 m butterfly	55.82	1 Q	56.33	3 Q	55.72	3rd place, bronze medalist(s)
Kaylee McKeown	100 m backstroke	57.88	1 Q OR	58.11	3 Q	57.47 OR	1st place, gold medalist(s)
Kaylee McKeown	200 m backstroke	2:08.18	1 Q	2:07.93	5 Q	2:04.68	1st place, gold medalist(s)
Kiah Melverton	800 m freestyle	8:20.45	7 Q	—N/a		8:22.25	6
Kiah Melverton	1500 m freestyle	15:58.96	8 Q	—N/a		16:00.36	6
Emily Seebohm	100 m backstroke	58.86	5 Q	58.59	6 Q	58.45	5
Emily Seebohm	200 m backstroke	2:09.10	=8 Q	2:07.09	1 Q	2:06.17	3rd place, bronze medalist(s)
Jenna Strauch	200 m breaststroke	2:23.30	9 Q	2:24.25	9	Did not advance	
Brianna Throssell	100 m butterfly	58.08	16 Q	57.59	12	Did not advance	
Brianna Throssell	200 m butterfly	2:09.34	9 Q	2:08.41	6 Q	2:09.48	8
Ariarne Titmus	200 m freestyle	1:55.88	3 Q	1:54.82	1 Q	1:53.50 OR	1st place, gold medalist(s)
Ariarne Titmus	400 m freestyle	4:01.66	3 Q	—N/a		3:56.69 OC	1st place, gold medalist(s)
Ariarne Titmus	800 m freestyle	8:18.99	6 Q	—N/a		8:13.83 OC	2nd place, silver medalist(s)
Madison Wilson	200 m freestyle	1:55.87	4 Q	1:56.58	8 Q	1:56.39	8
Bronte Campbell; Cate Campbell; Meg Harris; Emma McKeon; Mollie O'Callaghan^{[a]} Madison Wilson^{[a]}	4 × 100 m freestyle relay	3:31.73	1 Q	—N/a		3:29.69 WR	1st place, gold medalist(s)
Tamsin Cook^{[a]} Meg Harris^{[a]} Emma McKeon; Leah Neale; Mollie O'Callaghan^{[a]} Brianna Throssell^{[a]} Ariarne Titmus; Madison Wilson	4 × 200 m freestyle relay	7:44.61	1 Q	—N/a		7:41.29 OC	3rd place, bronze medalist(s)
Cate Campbell; Chelsea Hodges; Emma McKeon; Kaylee McKeown; Mollie O'Callaghan^{[a]} Emily Seebohm^{[a]} Brianna Throssell^{[a]}	4 × 100 m medley relay	3:55.39	3 Q	—N/a		3:51.60 OR	1st place, gold medalist(s)

Mixed

Athlete	Event	Heat		Final	
Athlete	Event	Time	Rank	Time	Rank
Bronte Campbell^{[a]} Isaac Cooper^{[a]} Emma McKeon; Kaylee McKeown; Zac Stubblety-Cook; Matthew Temple; Brianna Throssell^{[a]}	4 × 100 m medley relay	3:42.35	4 Q	3:38.95	3rd place, bronze medalist(s)

^{a} Swimmers who participated in the heats only.

Several swimmers withdrew from events originally selected – Kyle Chalmers (200m freestyle), Emma McKeon (200m freestyle) and Matthew Temple (100m freestyle) and were replaced by swimmers already selected. On 22 July, Kaylee McKeown withdrew from the women's 200 m individual medley to focus on her backstroke double.

== Table tennis ==
Australia entered six athletes into the table tennis competition at the Games. The men's and women's teams secured their respective Olympic berths by winning the gold medal each at the Oceania Qualification Event in Mornington, Victoria, permitting a maximum of two starters to compete each in the men's and women's singles tournament.

On 22 July 2020, Australian Olympic Committee nominated Rio 2016 Olympians David Powell and Chris Yan, returning Olympian Stephanie Sang from Beijing 2008, and rookie Michelle Bromley to compete in their respective singles tournaments for Tokyo 2020, following their top two finish at a national selection meet in Melbourne.

Men

Athlete	Event	Preliminary	Round 1	Round 2	Round 3	Round of 16	Quarterfinals	Semifinals	Final / BM	
Athlete	Event	Opposition Result	Opposition Result	Opposition Result	Opposition Result	Opposition Result	Opposition Result	Opposition Result	Opposition Result	Rank
David Powell	Singles	Širuček (CZE); W WO	Wang (SVK); L 0–4	Did not advance						
Chris Yan	Singles	Bye	Ionescu (ROU); L 1–4	Did not advance						
Hu Heming; David Powell; Chris Yan	Team	Bye				Japan; L 0–3	Did not advance			

Women

Athlete	Event	Preliminary	Round 1	Round 2	Round 3	Round of 16	Quarterfinals	Semifinals	Final / BM	
Athlete	Event	Opposition Result	Opposition Result	Opposition Result	Opposition Result	Opposition Result	Opposition Result	Opposition Result	Opposition Result	Rank
Michelle Bromley	Singles	Bye	Partyka (POL); L 0–4	Did not advance						
Jian Fang Lay	Singles	Fonseca (CUB); W 4–0	Vivarelli (ITA); W 4–1	Li Q (POL); W 4–2	Han Y (GER); L 0–4	Did not advance				
Michelle Bromley; Jian Fang Lay; Melissa Tapper	Team	Bye				Germany; L 0–3	Did not advance			

Mixed

Athlete	Event	Round of 16	Quarterfinals	Semifinals	Final / BM	
Athlete	Event	Opposition Result	Opposition Result	Opposition Result	Opposition Result	Rank
Hu Heming; Melissa Tapper	Doubles	Lebesson / Yuan (FRA); L 0–4	Did not advance			

== Taekwondo ==
Australia entered four athletes into the taekwondo competition at the Games. Two-time Olympian Safwan Khalil (men's 58 kg), Jack Marton (men's 80 kg), Stacey Hymer (women's 57 kg), and Reba Stewart (women's +67 kg) topped the podium in each of their respective weight classes to secure the spots on the Australian squad at the 2020 Oceania Qualification Tournament in Gold Coast, Queensland.

Athlete	Event	Round of 16	Quarterfinals	Semifinals	Repechage	Final / BM	
Athlete	Event	Opposition Result	Opposition Result	Opposition Result	Opposition Result	Opposition Result	Rank
Safwan Khalil	Men's −58 kg	Sawekwiharee (THA); L 7–23	Did not advance				
Jack Marton	Men's −80 kg	Eissa (EGY); L 1–11	Did not advance				
Stacey Hymer	Women's −57 kg	Park (CAN); L 15–25	Did not advance				
Reba Stewart	Women's +67 kg	Kowalczuk (POL); L 2–7	Did not advance				

== Tennis ==
The main qualifying criterion will be players' positions on the ATP and WTA ranking lists published on 14 June 2021 after the 2021 French Open. The players entering were formally submitted by the International Tennis Federation. The ATP and WTA rankings were based on performances from the previous 52 weeks, and there were several tournaments in the two-month period between the time of the rankings being frozen for entry and the beginning of the tennis events at the Olympics. Players had to be part of a nominated team for three Billie Jean King Cup (women) or Davis Cup (men) events between the 2016 and 2020 Olympics. This requirement was reduced to two Fed/Davis Cup events during the Olympic cycle from 2016 to 2020 if their nation competed at the Zone Group round robin level for three of the four years or if the player had represented their nation at least twenty times.

No quota spots are available for mixed doubles; instead, all teams have to consist of players already qualified in the singles or doubles. The top 15 combined ranking teams and the host nation qualified.

Australia has four players eligible players in the men's tournaments and three in the women's.

Men

Athlete	Event	Round of 64	Round of 32	Round of 16	Quarterfinals	Semifinals	Final / BM	
Athlete	Event	Opposition Score	Opposition Score	Opposition Score	Opposition Score	Opposition Score	Opposition Score	Rank
James Duckworth	Singles	Klein (SVK); W 5–7, 6–3, 7–6^{(7–4)}	Khachanov (ROC); L 5–7, 1–6	Did not advance				
John Millman	Singles	Musetti (ITA); W 6–3, 6–4	Davidovich Fokina (ESP); L 4–6, 7–6^{(7–4)}, 3–6	Did not advance				
Max Purcell	Singles	Auger-Aliassime (CAN); W 6–4, 7–6^{(7–2)}	Koepfer (GER); L 3–6, 0–6	Did not advance				
Luke Saville	Singles	Hurkacz (POL); L 2–6, 4–6	Did not advance					
John Millman; Luke Saville	Doubles	—N/a	Marach / Oswald (AUT); L 5–7, 2–6	Did not advance				
John Peers; Max Purcell	Doubles	—N/a	Krajicek / Sandgren (USA); L 6–3, 6–7^{(5–7)}, [5–10]	Did not advance				

Women

Athlete	Event	Round of 64	Round of 32	Round of 16	Quarterfinals	Semifinals	Final / BM	
Athlete	Event	Opposition Score	Opposition Score	Opposition Score	Opposition Score	Opposition Score	Opposition Score	Rank
Ashleigh Barty	Singles	Sorribes Tormo (ESP); L 4–6, 3–6	Did not advance					
Samantha Stosur	Singles	Rybakina (KAZ); L 4–6, 2–6	Did not advance					
Ajla Tomljanović	Singles	Shvedova (KAZ); W 7–5, 3–2, ret	Svitolina (UKR); L 6–4, 3–6, 4–6	Did not advance				
Ashleigh Barty; Storm Sanders	Doubles	—N/a	Hibino / Ninomiya (JPN); W 6–1, 6–2	Xu / Yang (CHN); W 6–4, 6–4	Krejčíková / Siniaková (CZE); L 6–3, 4–6, [7–10]	Did not advance		
Ellen Perez; Samantha Stosur	Doubles	—N/a	Ostapenko / Sevastova (LAT); W 4–6, 6–1, [10–5]	Niculescu / Olaru (ROU); W 7–6^{(7–3)}, 7–5	Bencic / Golubic (SUI); L 4–6, 4–6	Did not advance		

Mixed

Athlete	Event	Round of 16	Quarterfinals	Semifinals	Final / BM	
Athlete	Event	Opposition Score	Opposition Score	Opposition Score	Opposition Score	Rank
Ashleigh Barty; John Peers	Doubles	Podoroska / Zeballos (ARG); W 6–1, 7–6^{(7–3)}	Sakkari / Tsitsipas (GRE); W 6–4, 4–6, [10–6]	Pavlyuchenkova / Rublev (ROC); L 7–5, 4–6, [11–13]	Stojanović / Djokovic (SRB); W WO	3rd place, bronze medalist(s)

== Triathlon ==
Australia qualified six triathletes for the following events at the Games by finishing among the top seven nations in the ITU Mixed Relay Olympic Rankings and the calculation of quotas following the 2021 World Triathlon Cup.

Individual

Athlete	Event	Time						Rank
Athlete	Event	Swim (1.5 km)	Trans 1	Bike (40 km)	Trans 2	Run (10 km)	Total	Rank
Jacob Birtwhistle	Men's	18:14	0:38	56:11	0:28	31:01	1:46:32	16
Matthew Hauser	Men's	18:07	0:42	56:18	0:29	31:59	1:47:35	24
Aaron Royle	Men's	18:09	0:41	56:14	0:32	32:21	1:47:57	26
Ashleigh Gentle	Women's	20:07	0:45	Lapped				
Jaz Hedgeland	Women's	19:44	0:41	Lapped				
Emma Jeffcoat	Women's	19:06	0:42	1:03:18	0:38	39:13	2:02:57	26

Relay

Athlete	Event	Time						Rank
Athlete	Event	Swim (300 m)	Trans 1	Bike (7 km)	Trans 2	Run (2 km)	Total group	Rank
Jacob Birtwhistle	Mixed relay	4:08	0:37	9:47	0:28	5:25	20:25	—N/a
Matthew Hauser	Mixed relay	4:00	0:37	9:56	0:27	5:56	20:56	—N/a
Ashleigh Gentle	Mixed relay	4:33	0:41	10:56	0:30	6:17	22:57	—N/a
Emma Jeffcoat	Mixed relay	3:45	0:41	10:37	0:25	6:41	22:09	—N/a
Total	Mixed relay	—N/a					1:26:27	9

== Volleyball ==
=== Beach ===
Australia women's beach volleyball pair qualified for the Games, as the result in the FIVB Beach volleyball Olympic Ranking List of 13 June 2021.

Athlete	Event	Preliminary round				Repechage	Round of 16	Quarterfinal	Semifinal	Final / BM	
Athlete	Event	Opposition Result	Opposition Result	Opposition Result	Rank	Opposition Result	Opposition Result	Opposition Result	Opposition Result	Opposition Result	Rank
Chris McHugh; Damien Schumann	Men's	Mol / Sørum (NOR); L (18–21, 21–18, 13–15)	Leshukov / Semenov (ROC); L (14–21, 16–21)	Gavira / Herrera (ESP); L (16–21, 16–21)	4	Did not advance					
Mariafe Artacho; Taliqua Clancy	Women's	Echevarría / Martínez (CUB); W (21–15, 21–14)	Menegatti / Orsi Toth (ITA); W (22–20, 21–19)	Kholomina / Makroguzova (ROC); L (8–21, 21–15, 12–15)	2 Q	—N/a	Xue C / Wang X (CHN); W (22–20, 21–13)	Pavan / Humana-Paredes (CAN); W (21–15,19–21,15–12)	Graudiņa / Kravčenoka (LAT); W (23–21, 21–13)	Klineman / Ross (USA); L (15-21, 16-21)	2nd place, silver medalist(s)

== Water polo ==
Summary

Key:
- FT – After full time.
- P – Match decided by penalty-shootout.

Team	Event	Group stage						Quarterfinal	Semifinal	Final / BM	
Team	Event	Opposition Score	Opposition Score	Opposition Score	Opposition Score	Opposition Score	Rank	Opposition Score	Opposition Score	Opposition Score	Rank
Australia men's	Men's tournament	Montenegro; L 10–15	Croatia; W 11–8	Serbia; L 8–14	Spain; L 5–16	Kazakhstan; W 15–7	5	did not advance			
Australia women's	Women's tournament	Canada; W 8–5	Netherlands; W 15–12	Spain; L 9–15	South Africa; W 14–1	—N/a	2 Q	ROC; L 8–9	Classification semifinal Canada; W 10–10 (4-2)	Fifth place final Netherlands; W 14-7	5

=== Men's tournament ===
Team roster

Australia's final squad was announced on 1 July 2021.

Head coach: (Croatia) Elvis Fatović

No.	Player	Pos.	L/R	Height	Weight	Date of birth (age)	Apps	OG/ Goals	Club	Ref
1	Anthony Hrysanthos	GK	R			28 November 1995 (aged 25)	70	0/0	(Australia) Sydney University Lions	
2	Richie Campbell	CB	R	1.93 m (6 ft 4 in)	99 kg (218 lb)	18 September 1987 (aged 33)	287	3/23	(Australia) UNSW Wests Magpies	
3	George Ford	CB	R	1.92 m (6 ft 4 in)	95 kg (209 lb)	24 February 1993 (aged 28)	132	1/1	(Australia) Sydney University Lions	
4	Goran Tomasevic	CF	R			21 June 1990 (aged 31)	0	0/0	(Australia) Sydney University Lions	
5	Nathan Power	CB	R	2.00 m (6 ft 7 in)	104 kg (229 lb)	13 February 1993 (aged 28)	164	0/0	(Australia) UNSW Wests Magpies	
6	Lachlan Edwards	D	R	1.96 m (6 ft 5 in)		6 February 1995 (aged 26)	79	0/0	(Australia) Drummoyne Devils	
7	Aidan Roach	D	R	1.87 m (6 ft 2 in)	88 kg (194 lb)	7 September 1990 (aged 30)	192	2/6	(Australia) Drummoyne Devils	
8	Aaron Younger (C)	D	R	1.93 m (6 ft 4 in)	100 kg (220 lb)	25 September 1991 (aged 29)	199	2/9	(Italy) Pro Recco	
9	Andrew Ford	D	R	1.89 m (6 ft 2 in)		21 April 1995 (aged 26)	75	0/0	(Australia) UNSW Wests Magpies	
10	Timothy Putt	CB	R			6 November 1998 (aged 22)	70	0/0	(Australia) UNSW Wests Magpies	
11	Rhys Howden	D	R	1.89 m (6 ft 2 in)	84 kg (185 lb)	2 April 1987 (aged 34)	234	3/14	(Australia) Queensland Thunder	
12	Blake Edwards	CF	R	1.88 m (6 ft 2 in)		14 February 1992 (aged 29)	94	0/0	(Australia) Drummoyne Devils	
13	Joel Dennerley	GK	R	1.95 m (6 ft 5 in)	91 kg (201 lb)	25 June 1987 (aged 34)	151	2/0	(Australia) UNSW Wests Magpies	
Average				1.92 m (6 ft 4 in)	94 kg (207 lb)	29 years, 123 days	134			

Note: Age as of 23 July 2021
Source: Australia Men | Tokyo 2020 Olympics Archived 2021-07-22 at the Wayback Machine

Group play

Pos	Team	Pld	W	D	L	GF	GA	GD	Pts	Qualification
1	Spain	5	5	0	0	61	31	+30	10	Quarterfinals
2	Croatia	5	3	0	2	62	46	+16	6 (Note: Croatia 14–12 Serbia)	Quarterfinals
3	Serbia	5	3	0	2	70	46	+24	6	Quarterfinals
4	Montenegro	5	2	0	3	54	56	−2	4 (Note: Australia 10–15 Montenegro)	Quarterfinals
5	Australia	5	2	0	3	49	60	−11	4	
6	Kazakhstan	5	0	0	5	35	92	−57	0	

Source: Tokyo 2020 and FINA
Rules for classification: 1) Points; 2) Head-to-head points; 3) Head-to-head goal difference; 4) Head-to-head goals scored; 5) Goal difference.
Notes:

25 July 2021; 15:30 v	Report	Australia	10–15	Montenegro	Tokyo Tatsumi International Swimming Center; Referees: Adrian Alexandrescu (ROU), Alessandro Severo (ITA)
25 July 2021; 15:30 v	Report	Score by quarters: 5–4, 2–2, 1–4, 2–5			Tokyo Tatsumi International Swimming Center; Referees: Adrian Alexandrescu (ROU), Alessandro Severo (ITA)
25 July 2021; 15:30 v	Report	Campbell 3	Goals	Ukropina 4	Tokyo Tatsumi International Swimming Center; Referees: Adrian Alexandrescu (ROU), Alessandro Severo (ITA)

27 July 2021; 19:50 v	Report	Australia	11–8	Croatia	Tokyo Tatsumi International Swimming Center; Referees: Frank Ohme (GER), Michael Goldenberg (USA)
27 July 2021; 19:50 v	Report	Score by quarters: 3–3, 2–0, 2–3, 4–2			Tokyo Tatsumi International Swimming Center; Referees: Frank Ohme (GER), Michael Goldenberg (USA)
27 July 2021; 19:50 v	Report	Campbell 3	Goals	Joković 3	Tokyo Tatsumi International Swimming Center; Referees: Frank Ohme (GER), Michael Goldenberg (USA)

29 July 2021; 19:50 v	Report	Serbia	14–8	Australia	Tokyo Tatsumi International Swimming Center; Referees: Frank Ohme (GER), Georgios Stavridis (GRE)
29 July 2021; 19:50 v	Report	Score by quarters: 6–0, 4–1, 1–2, 3–5			Tokyo Tatsumi International Swimming Center; Referees: Frank Ohme (GER), Georgios Stavridis (GRE)
29 July 2021; 19:50 v	Report	Mandić 4	Goals	B. Edwards 2	Tokyo Tatsumi International Swimming Center; Referees: Frank Ohme (GER), Georgios Stavridis (GRE)

31 July 2021; 11:30 v	Report	Australia	5–16	Spain	Tokyo Tatsumi International Swimming Center; Referees: Adrian Alexandrescu (ROU), Sébastien Dervieux (FRA)
31 July 2021; 11:30 v	Report	Score by quarters: 2–4, 1–4, 2–5, 0–3			Tokyo Tatsumi International Swimming Center; Referees: Adrian Alexandrescu (ROU), Sébastien Dervieux (FRA)
31 July 2021; 11:30 v	Report	Edwards, Younger 2	Goals	Granados 4	Tokyo Tatsumi International Swimming Center; Referees: Adrian Alexandrescu (ROU), Sébastien Dervieux (FRA)

2 August 2021; 19:50 v	Report	Australia	15–7	Kazakhstan	Tokyo Tatsumi International Swimming Center; Referees: Germán Moller (ARG), Michael Goldenberg (USA)
2 August 2021; 19:50 v	Report	Score by quarters: 4–1, 3–0, 5–2, 3–4			Tokyo Tatsumi International Swimming Center; Referees: Germán Moller (ARG), Michael Goldenberg (USA)
2 August 2021; 19:50 v	Report	Howden 5	Goals	Shakenov, Ukumanov 2	Tokyo Tatsumi International Swimming Center; Referees: Germán Moller (ARG), Michael Goldenberg (USA)

=== Women's tournament ===
Team roster

Australia's final squad was announced on 24 May 2021.

Head coach: Predrag Mihailović

No.	Player	Pos.	L/R	Height	Weight	Date of birth (age)	Apps	OG/ Goals	Club	Ref
1	Lea Yanitsas	GK	R	1.73 m (5 ft 8 in)	77 kg (170 lb)	15 March 1989 (aged 32)	156	1/0	(Australia) UNSW Killer Whales	
2	Keesja Gofers	D	R	1.76 m (5 ft 9 in)	70 kg (154 lb)	16 March 1990 (aged 31)	201	1/5	(Australia) Sydney University Lions	
3	Hannah Buckling	CB	R	1.77 m (5 ft 10 in)	75 kg (165 lb)	3 June 1992 (aged 29)	184	1/5	(Australia) Sydney University Lions	
4	Bronte Halligan	D	R	1.80 m (5 ft 11 in)	70 kg (154 lb)	12 August 1996 (aged 24)	103	0/0	(Australia) UNSW Killer Whales	
5	Elle Armit	CF	R	1.85 m (6 ft 1 in)		20 August 1991 (aged 29)	70	0/0	(Australia) Drummoyne Devils	
6	Bronwen Knox	CB	R	1.82 m (6 ft 0 in)	88 kg (194 lb)	16 April 1986 (aged 35)	387	3/20	(Australia) Queensland Thunder	
7	Rowena Webster (C)	D	R	1.78 m (5 ft 10 in)	80 kg (176 lb)	27 December 1987 (aged 33)	305	2/23	(Australia) UTS Balmain Tigers	
8	Amy Ridge	CB	R	1.86 m (6 ft 1 in)		15 August 1996 (aged 24)	81	0/0	(Australia) UNSW Killer Whales	
9	Zoe Arancini	D	R	1.70 m (5 ft 7 in)	70 kg (154 lb)	14 July 1991 (aged 30)	256	1/6	(Australia) Fremantle Marlins	
10	Lena Mihailović	D	R	1.68 m (5 ft 6 in)		10 August 1996 (aged 24)	44	0/0	(Australia) ACU Cronulla Sharks	
11	Matilda Kearns	CF	R	1.76 m (5 ft 9 in)		2 October 2000 (aged 20)	5	0/0	(Australia) Sydney University Lions	
12	Abby Andrews	D	L			28 November 2000 (aged 20)	5	0/0	(Australia) Queensland Thunder	
13	Gabriella Palm	GK	R	1.82 m (6 ft 0 in)		20 May 1998 (aged 23)	50	0/0	(Australia) Queensland Thunder	
Average				1.78 m (5 ft 10 in)	76 kg (168 lb)	27 years, 283 days	142			

Note: Age as of 23 July 2021
Source: Australia Women | Tokyo 2020 Olympics Archived 2021-07-22 at the Wayback Machine

Group play

Pos	Team	Pld	W	D	L	GF	GA	GD	Pts	Qualification
1	Spain	4	3	0	1	71	37	+34	6 (Note: Spain 2 Pts, +5 GD; Netherlands 2 Pts, −2 GD; Australia 2 Pts, −3 GD. Spain first and after that the head-to head results between Australia and Netherlands (15–12) came into effect.)	Quarterfinals
2	Australia	4	3	0	1	46	33	+13	6	Quarterfinals
3	Netherlands	4	3	0	1	75	41	+34	6	Quarterfinals
4	Canada	4	1	0	3	48	39	+9	2	Quarterfinals
5	South Africa	4	0	0	4	7	97	−90	0	

Source: Tokyo 2020 and FINA
Rules for classification: 1) Points; 2) Head-to-head points; 3) Head-to-head goal difference; 4) Head-to-head goals scored; 5) Goal difference.
Notes:

24 July 2021; 15:30 v	Report	Canada	5–8	Australia	Tokyo Tatsumi International Swimming Center; Referees: Michael Goldenberg (USA), György Kun (HUN)
24 July 2021; 15:30 v	Report	Score by quarters: 1–1, 2–4, 1–2, 1–1			Tokyo Tatsumi International Swimming Center; Referees: Michael Goldenberg (USA), György Kun (HUN)
24 July 2021; 15:30 v	Report	Eggens 3	Goals	Halligan 3	Tokyo Tatsumi International Swimming Center; Referees: Michael Goldenberg (USA), György Kun (HUN)

26 July 2021; 18:20 v	Report	Australia	15–12	Netherlands	Tokyo Tatsumi International Swimming Center; Referees: Adrian Alexandrescu (ROU), Arkadii Voevodin (RUS)
26 July 2021; 18:20 v	Report	Score by quarters: 3–3, 2–5, 5–2, 5–2			Tokyo Tatsumi International Swimming Center; Referees: Adrian Alexandrescu (ROU), Arkadii Voevodin (RUS)
26 July 2021; 18:20 v	Report	three players 3	Goals	four players 2	Tokyo Tatsumi International Swimming Center; Referees: Adrian Alexandrescu (ROU), Arkadii Voevodin (RUS)

30 July 2021; 19:50 v	Report	Spain	15–9	Australia	Tokyo Tatsumi International Swimming Center; Referees: Sébastien Dervieux (FRA), Arkadii Voevodin (RUS)
30 July 2021; 19:50 v	Report	Score by quarters: 3–3, 4–3, 4–1, 4–2			Tokyo Tatsumi International Swimming Center; Referees: Sébastien Dervieux (FRA), Arkadii Voevodin (RUS)
30 July 2021; 19:50 v	Report	Ortiz 5	Goals	Kearns, Webster 2	Tokyo Tatsumi International Swimming Center; Referees: Sébastien Dervieux (FRA), Arkadii Voevodin (RUS)

1 August 2021; 19:50 v	Report	Australia	14–1	South Africa	Tokyo Tatsumi International Swimming Center; Referees: Daniel Daners (URU), Jeremy Cheng (SGP)
1 August 2021; 19:50 v	Report	Score by quarters: 1–0, 6–1, 4–0, 3–0			Tokyo Tatsumi International Swimming Center; Referees: Daniel Daners (URU), Jeremy Cheng (SGP)
1 August 2021; 19:50 v	Report	five players 2	Goals	Vaughan 1	Tokyo Tatsumi International Swimming Center; Referees: Daniel Daners (URU), Jeremy Cheng (SGP)

Quarterfinal

3 August 2021; 19:50 v	Report	Australia	8–9	ROC	Tokyo Tatsumi International Swimming Center; Referees: Adrian Alexandrescu (ROU), Xevi Buch (ESP)
3 August 2021; 19:50 v	Report	Score by quarters: 2–4, 2–2, 2–2, 2–1			Tokyo Tatsumi International Swimming Center; Referees: Adrian Alexandrescu (ROU), Xevi Buch (ESP)
3 August 2021; 19:50 v	Report	Armit, Halligan 2	Goals	three players 2	Tokyo Tatsumi International Swimming Center; Referees: Adrian Alexandrescu (ROU), Xevi Buch (ESP)

Classification semifinal

5 August 2021; 18:20 v	Report	Australia	14–12 (PSO)	Canada	Tokyo Tatsumi International Swimming Center; Referees: Ursula Wengenroth (SUI), Alessandro Severo (ITA)
5 August 2021; 18:20 v	Report	Score by quarters: 2–3, 3–2, 3–3, 2–2 PSO: 4–2			Tokyo Tatsumi International Swimming Center; Referees: Ursula Wengenroth (SUI), Alessandro Severo (ITA)
5 August 2021; 18:20 v	Report	Arancini 5	Goals	four players 2	Tokyo Tatsumi International Swimming Center; Referees: Ursula Wengenroth (SUI), Alessandro Severo (ITA)

Fifth place game

7 August 2021; 11:00 v	Report	Netherlands	7–14	Australia	Tokyo Tatsumi International Swimming Center; Referees: Xevi Buch (ESP), Dion Willis (RSA)
7 August 2021; 11:00 v	Report	Score by quarters: 1–5, 1–3, 2–3, 3–3			Tokyo Tatsumi International Swimming Center; Referees: Xevi Buch (ESP), Dion Willis (RSA)
7 August 2021; 11:00 v	Report	Van de Kraats 3	Goals	Gofers 3	Tokyo Tatsumi International Swimming Center; Referees: Xevi Buch (ESP), Dion Willis (RSA)

== Weightlifting ==
Australian weightlifters qualified for five quota places at the games, based on the Tokyo 2020 Rankings Qualification List of 11 June 2021.

Athlete	Event	Snatch		Clean & jerk		Total	Rank
Athlete	Event	Result	Rank	Result	Rank	Total	Rank
Brandon Wakeling	Men's –73 kg	125	14	166	12	291	13
Matthew Lydement	Men's –109 kg	158	12	180	13	338	12
Erika Yamasaki	Women's –59 kg	75	12	95	12	170	12
Kiana Elliott	Women's –64 kg	101	5	108	12	209	11
Charisma Amoe-Tarrant	Women's +87 kg	105	7	138	6	243	6

== Non-competing sports ==
=== 3 × 3 basketball ===
The Australian women's 3v3 basketball team participated at the 2021 FIBA 3x3 Women's Olympic Qualifying Tournament but were defeated in the quarterfinals by Spain 14–12. The men's team were not eligible for the 2021 FIBA 3x3 Olympic Qualifying Tournament based on their ranking.

=== Baseball ===
Australia was set to compete in the 2021 Final Qualifier tournament for Baseball at the 2020 Summer Olympics in Puebla, Mexico from 22 June to 26 June 2021. However, on 9 June, the team announced that due to "logistical challenges", they had made a "gut-wrenching" decision to withdraw from the tournament. Baseball Australia Chief Executive Glenn Williams said the withdrawal was due to protocols around quarantining as a result of the COVID-19 pandemic. Australia was ranked sixth in the world at the time of its announcement to withdraw.

=== Fencing ===
Australia sent six fencers to the 2021 Asian Zone Olympic Qualifying in Tashkent, Uzbekistan from 25 to 26 April. However, none of the athletes were successful in qualifying for the Olympic events. The qualifiers eventually went to Roman Petrov from (Kyrgyzstan), Huang Mengkai (China), Sherzov Mamutov (Uzbekistan) in the men's event and Kiria Tikanah and Amita Berthier (Singapore), and Zaynab Dayibekova (Uzbekistan) in the women's event. Australia last participated in fencing at the 2004 Summer Olympics with Evelyn Halls in the women's épée.

=== Handball ===
Australia has not participated in handball at the Olympic Games since the 2000 Summer Olympics where it was the host. It has not qualified for the sport in an away tournament as of 2021.

=== Wrestling ===
Australia sent four athletes to the 2021 African & Oceania Wrestling Olympic Qualification Tournament and one athlete at the 2021 World Wrestling Olympic Qualification Tournament. However, no Australians who participated advanced to the finals to qualify for a berth at the wrestling event at the 2020 Olympics. Australia has won one silver and two bronze medals in freestyle wrestling but has not won a medal in the Greco-Roman event.

== Team facts ==
- The second-largest team sent from Australia to a non-home Olympic Games, behind the 482 athletes who competed at the 2004 Summer Olympics.
- The third-largest Australian contingent sent to an Olympic Games, behind the 617 athletes who competed at the 2000 Summer Olympics.
- Highest percentage of female athletes to compete for Australia – 53.5% (256 athletes) (Previous highest 50.90% Rio 2016 – 214 athletes)
- Highest number of Indigenous athletes – 16 athletes. (Previous highest 12 at Sydney 2000). Women – Ash Barty (tennis), Angeline Blackburn (athletics), Taliqua Clancy (beach volleyball), Leilani Mitchell (basketball), Brooke Peris (hockey), Stacy Porter (softball), Kyah Simon (football), Tarni Stepto (softball), Lydia Williams (football). Men – Thomas Grice (shooting sports), Maurice Longbottom (rugby sevens), Patrick Mills (basketball), Dylan Pietsch (rugby sevens), Brandon Wakeling (weightlifting), Alex Winwood (boxing)
- Oldest ever Australian Olympic competitor – Mary Hanna 66, Equestrian
- Most Olympic Games for Australia – Andrew Hoy competing at his eighth Games in Tokyo
- Most Olympic Games for Australian women – Jian Fang Lay (table tennis) and Mary Hanna (equestrian) both competing at their sixth Games in Tokyo

== See also ==
- Australia at the 2020 Summer Paralympics
