= Thomas Grice =

Australian sports shooter

Personal information
- Nationality: Australian
- Born: 29 September 1992 (age 32); Sydney, Australia

Sport
- Sport: Sports shooting
- Coached by: John Maxwell

Thomas Grice (born 29 September 1992) is an Australian sports shooter. He competed in the men's trap event and the team event with Penny Smith at the 2020 Summer Olympics. He did not score sufficient points in either event to advance past qualification.
