= Simone Pearce =

Australian equestrian

Personal information
- Full name: Simone Alexandra Pearce
- Born: 18 July 1991 (age 34); Melbourne, Victoria, Australia

Sport
- Country: Australia
- Sport: Equestrian

Achievements and titles
- Olympic finals: 2020 Olympic Games; 2024 Olympic Games

Simone Alexandra Pearce (born 18 July 1991) is an Australian equestrian athlete. She competed at several World Championships for Young Dressage Horses and holds currently the Australian dressage records in the Grand Prix, Grand Prix Special and Grand Prix Freestyle. Pearce represented Australia at the Olympic Games in Tokyo, where she finished 36th in the individual competition with Destano. She also represented the Australian team at the 2024 Olympic Games in Paris, finishing 10th with the Australian team.

== Equestrian career ==
Pearce is born in Melbourne, Victoria and started riding at a young age. In 2010 she moved to Europe as working student and has worked in The Netherlands, Germany, Belgium and Denmark. After working for several stables and riders such as Andreas Helgstrand, she moved back to Germany in 2019 to work for Gestüt Sprehe. For Gestüt Sprehe, Pearce rides several horses including Destano, which she will compete at the Olympic Games in Tokyo.
