= Penny Smith (sport shooter) =

Australian sports shooter

Personal information
- Nationality: Australian
- Born: 21 April 1995 (age 31) Geelong, Australia
- Occupation: Lifeguard
- Height: 175 cm (5 ft 9 in)
- Weight: 70 kg (154 lb)

Sport
- Sport: Sports shooting
- Club: Colac Clay Target Club
- Coached by: John Maxwell
Medal record
Women's shooting
Representing Australia
Summer Olympics
Bronze medal – third place	2024 Paris	Trap
World Championships
Gold medal – first place	2017 Moscow	Mixed team trap
Silver medal – second place	2023 Baku	Team trap
Bronze medal – third place	2019 Lonato del Garda	Mixed team trap
Bronze medal – third place	2022 Osijek	Team trap

Penny Smith (born 21 April 1995) is an Australian sports shooter.

== Career ==
Smith competed in the women's trap event and also the team event with Thomas Grice at the 2020 Summer Olympics. She did not score sufficient points in either event to advance past qualification.

3 years later, Smith competed in the women's trap event at the 2024 Summer Olympics. Smith finished the qualification round in a three-way tie for sixth, but won a shoot-off to progress to the final. Smith won her first Olympic medal by coming third to claim the bronze.
