= Goran Tomasevic (water polo) =

Australian water polo player

Personal information
- Nationality: Australia
- Born: 21 June 1990 (age 35) Split, Croatia

Sport
- Sport: Water polo

Goran Tomasevic (born 21 June 1990) is an Australian water polo player.

Tomasevic was picked in the water polo Sharks squad to compete in the men's water polo tournament at the 2020 Summer Olympics. The team finished joint fourth on points in their pool but their inferior goal average meant they finished fifth overall and out of medal contention. They were able to upset Croatia in a group stage match 11–8.

Born in Croatia, Tomasevic played NCAA Division I water polo at the University of the Pacific before moving to Australia, where he became a citizen in 2021.
